= ACS Awards =

French television award

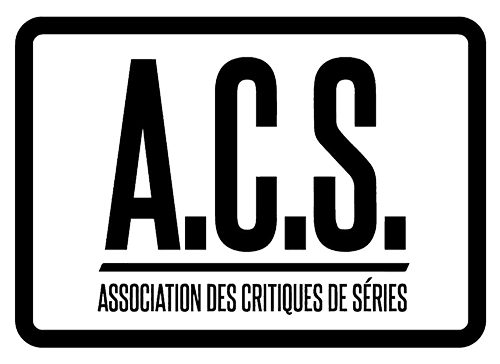
- ACS Logo
- Country: France
- Presented by: Press Association
- First award: 2015
- Website: acseries.net

The Association française des Critiques de Séries (ACS) is a set of awards bestowed by members of the French Press Association recognizing excellence in television fiction since 2015.

== 2015 ==
Best TV Series: P'tit Quinquin (Arte); Ainsi soient-ils (Arte); Spiral (Canal+); The Bureau (Canal+); Witnesses (France 2)	Best Director: Bruno Dumont – P'tit Quinquin (Arte); Frédéric Jardin – Spiral (Canal+); Hervé Hadmar – Witnesses (France 2); Virginie Sauveur – Virage Nord (Arte); Rodolphe Tissot – Ainsi soient-ils (Arte)
Best Actor: Philippe Duclos – Spiral (Canal+); Mathieu Kassovitz – The Bureau (Canal+); Thierry Godard – Un village français (France 3); Denis Ménochet – Spotless (Canal+); Bernard Pruvost – P'tit Quinquin (Arte)	Best Actress: Marie Dompnier – Witnesses (France 2); Valérie Bonneton – Fais pas ci, fais pas ça (France 2); Anne Charrier – Chefs (France 2); Audrey Fleurot – Un village français (France 3); Caroline Proust – Spiral (Canal+)
Best Writing: Anne Landois – Spiral (Canal+); Bruno Dumont – P'tit Quinquin (Arte); David Elkaïm & Vincent Poymiro – Ainsi soient-ils (Arte); Hervé Hadmar & Marc Herpoux – Witnesses (France 2); Cathy Verney & Michel Leclerc – Fais pas ci, fais pas ça (France 2)	Best Production: Tetra Media – Un village français (France 3); Cinétévé – Witnesses (France 2); Éléphant Story – Fais pas ci, fais pas ça (France 2); The Oligarchs Productions – The Bureau (Canal+); Zadig – Ainsi soient-ils (Arte)

Shows with multiple nominations
Nominations	Show
5	Spiral
5	Witnesses
4	P'tit Quinquin
4	Ainsi soient-ils
3	The Bureau
3	Un village français
3	Fais pas ci, fais pas ça

Networks with multiple nominations
Nominations	Network
9	Arte
9	Canal+
9	France 2
3	France 3

== 2016 ==
Best TV Series: Call My Agent! (France 2); Ainsi soient-ils (Arte); Baron Noir (Canal+); The Bureau (Canal+); The Tunnel (Canal+)	Best Director: Fabrice Gobert – The Returned (Canal+); Ziad Doueiri – Baron Noir (Canal+); Cédric Klapisch – Call My Agent! (France 2); Éric Rochant – The Bureau (Canal+); Rodolphe Tissot – Ainsi soient-ils (Arte)
Best Actor: Jacques Bonnaffé – Ainsi soient-ils (Arte); Kad Merad – Baron Noir (Canal+); Niels Arestrup – Baron Noir (Canal+); Thibault de Montalembert – Call My Agent! (France 2); Grégory Montel – Call My Agent! (France 2)	Best Actress: Camille Cottin – Call My Agent! (France 2); Valérie Bonneton – Fais pas ci, fais pas ça (France 2); Audrey Fleurot – Un village français (France 3); Sara Giraudeau – The Bureau (Canal+); Anna Mouglalis – Baron Noir (Canal+); Clémence Poésy – The Tunnel (Canal+)
Best Writing: Fanny Herrero – Call My Agent! (France 2); Eric Benzekri & Jean-Baptiste Delafon – Baron Noir (Canal+); David Elkaïm & Vincent Poymiro – Ainsi soient-ils (Arte); Frédéric Krivine – Un village français (France 3); Éric Rochant – The Bureau (Canal+)	Best Production: The Oligarchs Productions – The Bureau (Canal+); Haut et Court – The Returned (Canal+); Kwaï – Baron Noir (Canal+); Mon Voisin Productions & Mother Production – Call My Agent! (France 2); Tetra Media – Un village français (France 3); Zadig – Ainsi soient-ils (Arte)

Shows with multiple nominations
Nominations	Show
7	Call My Agent!
7	Baron Noir
5	Ainsi soient-ils
5	The Bureau
3	Un village français
2	The Returned
2	The Tunnel

Networks with multiple nominations
Nominations	Network
16	Canal+
8	France 2
5	Arte
3	France 3

== 2017 ==
Best TV Series: The Bureau (Canal+); Au-delà des murs (Arte); Call My Agent! (France 2); Irresponsable (OCS); Un village français (France 3)	Best Director: Hervé Hadmar – Au-delà des murs (Arte); Julien Despaux & Thierry Poiraud – Black Spot (France 2); Måns Mårlind & Björn Stein – Midnattssol (Canal+); Fred Scotlande – Loin de chez nous (France 4); Paolo Sorentino – The Young Pope (Canal +)
Best Actor: Sébastien Chassagne – Irresponsable (OCS); Laurent Capelluto – Black Spot (France 2); Jude Law – The Young Pope (Canal +); Nicolas Maury – Call My Agent! (France 2); Grégory Montel – Call My Agent! (France 2)	Best Actress: Camille Cottin – Call My Agent! (France 2); Leila Bekhti – Midnattssol (Canal+); Suliane Brahim – Black Spot (France 2); Laure Calamy – Call My Agent! (France 2); Corinne Masiero – Capitaine Marleau (France 3)
Best Writing: Éric Rochant – The Bureau (Canal+); Hervé Hadmar & Marc Herpoux – Au-delà des murs (Arte); Fanny Herrero – Call My Agent! (France 2); Frédéric Rosset – Irresponsable (OCS); Benjamin Parent & Joris Mario – Les Grands (OCS)	Best Production: Haut et Court – The Young Pope (Canal +); Tetra Media – Irresponsable (OCS); The Oligarchs Productions – The Bureau (Canal+); Calt – Loin de chez nous (France 4)

Shows with multiple nominations
Nominations	Show
6	Call My Agent!
4	Irresponsible
3	Au-delà des murs
3	Black Spot
3	The Bureau
3	The Young Pope
2	Loin de chez nous
2	Midnattssol

Networks with multiple nominations
Nominations	Network
9	France 2
5	Canal+
5	OCS
3	Arte
2	France 3
2	France 4

== 2018 ==
Best TV Series: Irresponsible (OCS); Baron Noir (Canal+); Spiral (Canal+); Fiertés (Arte); Les Grands (OCS)	Best Director: Laetitia Masson – Aurore (Arte); Ziad Doueiri & Antoine Chevrollier – Baron Noir (Canal+); Philippe Faucon – Fiertés (Arte); Julien Lacombe – Missions (OCS); Frédéric Mermoud & Frédéric Jardin – Spiral (Canal+)
Best Actor: Sébastien Chassagne – Irresponsable (OCS); Thierry Godard – Spiral (Canal+); Kad Merad – Baron Noir (Canal +); Samuel Theis – Fiertés (Arte); Malik Zidi – Nox (Canal+)	Best Actress: Alba Gaïa Bellugi – Manon 20 ans (Arte); Nathalie Baye – Nox (Canal+); Audrey Fleurot – Spiral (Canal+); Anna Mouglalis – Baron Noir (Canal +); Caroline Proust – Spiral (Canal+)
Best Writing: Camille & Frédéric Rosset – Irresponsable (OCS); Eric Benzekri & Jean-Baptiste Delafon – Baron Noir (Canal+); Olivier Joyard & Jérôme Larcher – J’ai deux amours (Arte); Anne Landois – Spiral (Canal+); Laetitia Masson – Aurore (Arte)	Best Production: Empreinte Digitale – Missions (OCS); Gaumont – Nox (Canal+); Pampa Production – Aurore (Arte); Scarlett Production & 13 Productions – Fiertés (Arte); Tetra Media – Un village français (France 3)

Shows with multiple nominations
Nominations	Show
6	Spiral
5	Baron Noir
4	Fiertés
3	Aurore
3	Irresponsable
3	Nox
2	Missions

Networks with multiple nominations
Nominations	Network
12	Canal+
9	Arte
6	OCS

== 2019 ==
Best TV Series: Hippocrate (Canal+); Aux animaux la guerre (France 3); Il Miracolo (Arte); The Bureau (Canal+); Vernon Subutex (Canal+)	Best Director: Thomas Cailley & Manuel Shapira – Ad Vitam (Arte); Thomas Lilti – Hippocrate (Canal+); Niccolò Ammaniti, Francesco Munzi & Lucio Pellegrini – Il Miracolo (Arte); Éric Rochant, Pascale Ferran, Anna Novion, Antoine Chevrollier & Laïla Marrakchi – The Bureau (Canal+); Cathy Verney – Vernon Subutex (Canal+)
Best Actor: Karim Leklou – Hippocrate (Canal+); Romain Duris – Vernon Subutex (Canal+); Mathieu Kassovitz – The Bureau (Canal+); Melvil Poupaud – Insoupçonnable (TF1); Roschdy Zem – Aux Animaux la guerre (France 3)	Best Actress: Garance Marillier – Ad Vitam (Arte); Alice Belaïdi – Hippocrate (Canal+); Louise Bourgoin – Hippocrate (Canal+); Caroline Proust – Spiral (Canal+); Céline Sallette – Vernon Subutex (Canal+)
Best Writing: Jean-François Halin, Claire Lemaréchal & Jean-André Yerlès – A Very Secret Service (Arte); Marine Francou, Sylvie Chanteux, Antonin Martin-Hilbert, Frédéric Balekdjian, Sophie Kovess-Brun, Erwan Augoyard, Anne Rambach & Marine Rambach – Spiral (Canal+); Thomas Lilti, Julien Lilti, Claude Le Pape & Anaïs Carpita – Hippocrate (Canal+); Niccolò Ammaniti, Francesca Manieri, Francesca Marciano & Stefano Bises – Il Miracolo (Arte); Éric Rochant, Capucine Rochant, Camille de Castelnau, Claire Lemaréchal, Cécile Ducrocq, Vincent Mariette, Olivier Dujols, Dominique Baumard, Gaëlle Bellan, Quoc Dang Tran, Raphaël Chevènement & Joëlle Touma – The Bureau (Canal+)	Best Production: Atlantique Productions, Lupa Film & Port-au-Prince – Eden (Arte); Kelija – Ad Vitam (Arte); 31 Juin Films & Les Films de Benjamin – Hippocrate (Canal+); Wild Side, Kwai & Sky – Il Miracolo (Arte); The Oligarchs Productions & Federation Entertainment – The Bureau (Canal+)
Best Main Title: Philharmonia (France 2); A Very Secret Service (Arte); Hippocrate (Canal+); Il Miracolo (Arte); Vernon Subutex (Canal+)

Shows with multiple nominations
Nominations	Show
8	Hippocrate
5	Il Miracolo
5	The Bureau
5	Vernon Subutex
3	Ad Vitam
2	A Very Secret Service
2	Aux animaux la guerre
2	Spiral

Networks with multiple nominations
Nominations	Network
20	Canal+
11	Arte
2	France 3

== 2020 ==
Best TV Series : 52 minutes: Mythomaniac (Arte); Baron Noir (Canal+); Savages (Canal+); Marianne (Netflix); Une belle histoire (France 2)	Best TV Series : 26 minutes: Parlement (France.tv Slash); Les grands (OCS); Mental (France.tv Slash); Skam France (France.tv Slash); Validé (Canal+)
Best Director: Damien Chazelle, Houda Benyamina, Laïla Marrakchi & Alan Poul – The Eddy (Netflix); Guillaume Desjardins, Jérémy Bernard & Bastien Ughetto – L’effondrement (Canal+); Rebecca Zlotowski – Savages (Canal+); Fabrice Gobert – Mythomaniac (Arte); Paolo Sorrentino – The New Pope (Canal+)	Best Writing: Jean-Xavier de Lestrade, Antoine Lacomblez, Sophie Hiet & Pierre Linhart – Jeux d’Influence (Arte); Éric Benzekri, Raphaël Chevènement, Olivier Demangel & Thomas Finkielkraut – Baron Noir (Canal+); Rebecca Zlotowski, Sabri Louatah, Benjamin Charbit & David Elkaïm – Savages (Canal+); Niccolò Ammaniti, Francesca Manieri & Anne Berest – Mythomaniac (Arte); Noé Debré, Daran Johnson, Pierre Dorac & Maxime Calligaro – Parlement (France.tv Slash)
Best Actor: Xavier Lacaille – Parlement (France.tv Slash); Mathieu Amalric – L’agent immobilier (Arte); Sébastien Chassagne – Une belle histoire (France 2); Hatik – Validé (Canal+); Roschdy Zem – Savages (Canal+)	Best Actress: Florence Loiret Caille – The Bureau (Canal+); Leïla Bekhti – The Eddy (Netflix); Tiphaine Daviot – Une belle histoire (France 2); Marina Hands – Mythomaniac (Arte); Alix Poisson – Jeux d’influence (Arte)
Best Production: The Oligarchs Productions & Federation Entertainment – The Bureau (Canal+); Quad Télévision & AT-Prod – Le Bazar de la Charité (TF1); CPB Films & Scarlett Production – Savages (Canal+); Unité de production – Mythomaniac (Arte); Cinétévé, Artémis & CineCentrum – Parlement (France.tv Slash)	Best Main Title: The New Pope (Canal+); Savages (Canal+); Missions (OCS); Trauma (13ème Rue); Une île (Arte)

Shows with multiple nominations
Nominations	Show
6	Savages
5	Mythomaniac
4	Parlement
3	Une belle histoire
2	Baron Noir
2	Jeux d’Influence
2	The Bureau
2	The Eddy
2	The New Pope
2	Validé

Networks with multiple nominations
Nominations	Network
15	Canal+
10	Arte
6	France.tv Slash
3	France 2
3	Netflix
2	OCS

== 2021 ==
Best TV Series : 52 minutes: Hippocrate (Canal+); Cheyenne & Lola (OCS); Call My Agent! (France 2); Laëtitia (France 2); No Man's Land (Arte)	Best TV Series : 26 minutes: UFOs (Canal+); 3615 Monique (OCS); Derby Girl (France.tv Slash); In Therapy (Arte); La Flamme (Canal+); Mental (France.tv Slash)
Best Director: Thomas Lilti – Hippocrate (Canal+); Frédéric Balekdjian, Julien Despaux & Fabien Nury – Paris Police 1900 (Canal+); Antony Cordier – UFOs (Canal+); Jean-Xavier de Lestrade – Laëtitia (France 2); Eshref Reybrouck – Cheyenne & Lola (OCS)	Best Writing: Virginie Brac – Cheyenne & Lola (OCS); Clémence Dargent, Martin Douaire, Julien Anscutter, Marie Eynard, Clémence Madeleine-Perdrillat & Rapahaëlle Richet – UFOs (Canal+); Jean-Xavier de Lestrade & Antoine Lacomblez – Laëtitia (France 2); Anaïs Carpita, Claude Le Pape, Thomas Lilti, Mehdi Fikri, Charlotte Sanson & Julien Lilti – Hippocrate (Canal+); Éric Toledano and Olivier Nakache, David Elkaïm, Pauline Guéna, Alexandre Manneville, Nacim Mehtar & Vincent Poymiro – In Therapy (Arte)
Best Actor: Melvil Poupaud – UFOs (Canal+); Jonathan Cohen – La Flamme (Canal+); Bouli Lanners – Hippocrate (Canal+); Félix Moati – No Man's Land (Arte); Frédéric Pierrot – In Therapy (Arte)	Best Actress: Céleste Brunnquell – In Therapy (Arte); Veerle Baetens – Cheyenne & Lola (OCS); Alice Belaïdi – Hippocrate (Canal+); Louise Bourgoin – Hippocrate (Canal+); Audrey Fleurot – HPI (TF1)
Best Production: Tetra Media & AFPI – Paris Police 1900 (Canal+); 31 Juin Films, Les Films de Benjamin & Scope Pictures – Hippocrate (Canal+); Netflix France & Gaumont Production – Lupin (Netflix); Montebello Productions, UMedia & BE-Films – UFOs (Canal+); Hulu, Haut et Court, Masha Productions, Spiro Films, Versus Production & Fremantle – No Man's Land (Arte)

Shows with multiple nominations
Nominations	Show
7	Hippocrate
5	UFOs
4	Cheyenne & Lola
4	In Therapy
3	Laëtitia
3	No Man's Land
2	La Flamme
2	Paris Police 1900

Networks with multiple nominations
Nominations	Network
16	Canal+
7	Arte
5	OCS
4	France 2
2	France.tv Slash

== 2022 ==
Best TV Series : 52 minutes: Oussekine (Disney+); Drôle (Netflix); Germinal (France 2); L’Opéra (OCS); Mythomaniac (Arte)	Best TV Series : 26 minutes: Parlement (France.tv Slash); In Therapy (Arte); Jeune et golri (OCS); La meilleure version de moi-même (Canal+); Nona et ses filles (Arte); UFOs (Canal+)
Best Director: Antony Cordier – UFOs (Canal+); Agnès Jaoui, Arnaud Desplechin, Emmanuelle Bercot, Emmanuel Finkiel, Éric Toledano and Olivier Nakache – In Therapy (Arte); David Hourrègue – Germinal (France 2); Stéphane Demoustier, Laïla Marrakchi, Inti Calfat, Cécile Ducrocq & Dirk Verheye – L’Opéra (OCS); Antoine Chevrollier – Oussekine (Disney+); Jean-Philippe Amar – Sentinelles (OCS); Frédéric Jardin, Antoine Blossier & Jérôme Salle – Totems (Amazon Prime Video)	Best Writing: Antoine Chevrollier, Julien Lilti, Cédric Ido, Faïza Guène, Lina Soualem & Juliette Lassalle – Oussekine (Disney+); Fanny Herrero, Camille de Castelnau, Hervé Lassïnce, Eliane Montane, Judith Havas & Lison Daniel – Drôle (Netflix); Éric Toledano and Olivier Nakache, Clémence Madeleine-Perdrillat, Mary Arnaud, Elise Benroubi, Maya Haffar, Clara Lemaire Anspach, Nils-Antoine Sambuc, Emmanuel Finkiel & Lola Gruber – In Therapy (Arte); Clémence Dargent, Martin Douaire, Maxime Berthemy & Raphaëlle Richet – UFOs (Canal+); Noé Debré, Maxime Calligaro, Pierre Dorac & Lily Lambert – Parlement (France.tv Slash)
Best Actor: Younès Boucif – Drôle (Netflix); Xavier Lacaille – Parlement (France.tv Slash); Raphaël Personnaz – L’Opéra (OCS); Frédéric Pierrot – In Therapy (Arte); Melvil Poupaud – UFOs (Canal+)	Best Actress: Ariane Labed – L’Opéra (OCS); Mouna Soualem – Oussekine (Disney+); Audrey Fleurot – HPI (TF1); Blanche Gardin – La meilleure version de moi-même (Canal+); Elsa Guedj – Drôle (Netflix); Agnès Hurstel – Jeune et golri (OCS)
Best Production: Itinéraire Productions – Oussekine (Disney+); Banijay Studios France & Rai – Germinal (France 2); Montebello Productions, UMedia & BE-Films – UFOs (Canal+); Cinétévé, CineCentrum & StudioHamburg Serienwerft – Parlement (France.tv Slash); Gaumont – Totems (Amazon Prime Video)

Shows with multiple nominations
Nominations	Show
5	Oussekine
5	UFOs
4	Drôle
4	In Therapy
4	L’Opéra
4	Parlement
3	Germinal
2	Jeune et golri
2	La meilleure version de moi-même
2	Totems

Networks with multiple nominations
Nominations	Network
7	Canal+
7	OCS
6	Arte
5	Disney+
4	France.tv Slash
4	Netflix
3	France 2
2	Amazon Prime Video

== 2023 ==
Best TV Series : 40 minutes: Le monde de demain (Arte); Black Butterflies (Arte); Greek Salad (Amazon Prime Video); L’Opéra (OCS); Vortex (France 2); Les randonneuses (TF1)	Best TV Series : 26 minutes: Chair tendre (France.tv Slash); En place (Netflix); Septième ciel (OCS); Des gens bien ordinaires (Canal+); Aspergirl (OCS)
Best Director: Katell Quillévéré & Hélier Cisterne – Le monde de demain (Arte); Olivier Abbou – Black Butterflies (Arte); Jérémie Guez – BRI (Canal+); Julien Despaux & Frédéric Balekdjian – Paris Police 1905 (Canal+); Yaël Langmann & Jérémy Mainguy – Chair tendre (France.tv Slash)	Best Writing: Olivier Abbou & Bruno Merle – Black Butterflies (Arte); Katell Quillévéré, Hélier Cisterne, Vincent Poymiro, David Elkaïm, Raphaël Chevènement, Nour Ben Salem, Ruddy Kabuiku – Le monde de demain (Arte); Yaël Langmann – Chair tendre (France.tv Slash); Élise Ayrault, Alpha Diallo, Dorothée Lachaud, Déborah Hassoun, Jean-Pascal Zadi & François Uzan – En place (Netflix); Maxime Donzel, Géraldine de Margerie & Benjamin Adam – Toutouyoutou (OCS); Clémence Azincourt, Alice Vial & Clément Marchand – Septième ciel (OCS)
Best Performance in a TV Series : 40 minutes: Anthony Bajon – Le monde de demain (Arte); Melvin Boomer – Le monde de demain (Arte); Julia de Nunez – Bardot (France 2); Sofian Khammes – BRI (Canal+); Clémentine Célarié – Les randonneuses (TF1); Ariane Labed – L’Opéra (OCS)	Best Performance in a TV Series : 26 minutes: Angèle Metzger – Chair tendre (France.tv Slash); Jean-Pascal Zadi – En place (Netflix); Féodor Atkine – Septième ciel (OCS); Sylvie Granotier – Septième ciel (OCS); Nicole Ferroni – Aspergirl (OCS); Jérémy Gillet – Des gens bien ordinaires (Canal+)
Best Supporting Role in a TV Series : 40 minutes: Suzy Bemba – L’Opéra (OCS); Marc Barbé – Paris Police 1905 (Canal+); Andranic Manet – Le monde de demain (Arte); Laurent Stocker – Jeux d'influence - les combattantes (Arte); Ophélie Bau – BRI (Canal+); Romain Duris – Greek Salad (Amazon Prime Video); Niels Arestrup – Black Butterflies (Arte)	Best Supporting Role in a TV Series : 26 minutes: Saül Benchetrit – Chair tendre (France.tv Slash); Romane Bohringer – Des gens bien ordinaires (Canal+); Sophie-Marie Larrouy – Des gens bien ordinaires (Canal+); Daphné Bürki – Chair tendre (France.tv Slash); Éric Judor – En place (Netflix); Carel Brown – Aspergirl (OCS); Justine Lacroix – Septième ciel (OCS); Irène Jacob – Septième ciel (OCS)
Best Production: Les Films du Bélier & Perpetual Soup – Le monde de demain (Arte); Tetra Media & AFPI – Paris Police 1905 (Canal+); Ce qui me meut – Greek Salad (Amazon Prime Video); Jérico, La Fabrique & Big Band Story – Chair tendre (France.tv Slash); Belga Productions – L’Opéra (OCS); Mediawan, GMT Productions & Jack n’a qu’un œil – Black Butterflies (Arte)	Best Score: Proof – ReuSSS (France.tv Slash); Amine Bouhafa – Le monde de demain (Arte); Polérik Rouvière – Visitors (Warner TV); Clément Doumic, Antoine Wilson & Sébastien Wolf – Toutouyoutou (OCS); Loïk Dury – Greek Salad (Amazon Prime Video)
Best International TV Series: Succession – USA (Amazon Prime Video); The Last of Us – USA (Amazon Prime Video); The Bear – USA (Disney+); State of the Union – UK (Arte); La Nuit où Laurier Gaudreault s’est réveillé – Canada (Canal+); Better Call Saul – USA (Netflix); Abbott Elementary – USA (Disney+)

Shows with multiple nominations
Nominations	Show
8	Le monde de demain
7	Chair tendre
6	Septième ciel
5	Black Butterflies
4	Des gens bien ordinaires
4	En place
4	Greek Salad
4	L’Opéra
3	Aspergirl
3	BRI
3	Paris Police 1905
2	Les randonneuses
2	Toutouyoutou

Networks with multiple nominations
Nominations	Network
15	Arte
15	OCS
11	Canal+
8	France.tv Slash
6	Amazon Prime Video
5	Netflix
2	Disney+
2	France 2
2	TF1

== 2024 ==
Best TV Series : 40 minutes: Sambre - Anatomy of a Crime (France 2); La fièvre (Canal+); Of Money and Blood (Canal+); Polar Park (Arte); Tout va bien (Disney+)	Best TV Series : 26 minutes: Samuel (Arte); Fiasco (Netflix); Icon of French Cinema (Arte); Irrésistible (Disney+); Killer Coaster (Amazon Prime Video); Parlement (France.tv Slash); Sous contrôle (Arte); Split (France.tv Slash)
Best Director: Jean-Xavier de Lestrade – Sambre - Anatomy of a Crime (France 2); Xavier Giannoli & Frédéric Planchon – Of Money and Blood (Canal+); Vincent Maël Cardona – De Grâce (Arte); Émilie Tronche – Samuel (Arte); Fred Grivois – Machine (Arte); Iris Brey – Split (France.tv Slash); Gérald Hustache-Mathieu – Polar Park (Arte)	Best Writing: Alice Géraud & Marc Herpoux – Sambre - Anatomy of a Crime (France 2); Xavier Giannoli & Jean-Baptiste Delafon – Of Money and Blood (Canal+); Benjamin Charbit & Charly Delwart – Sous contrôle (Arte); Gérald Hustache-Mathieu – Polar Park (Arte); Éric Benzekri, Laure Chichmanov & Anthony Gizel – La fièvre (Canal+); Noé Debré, Pierre Dorac, Maxime Calligaro, Marieke Engelhardt & Andrew Bampfield – Parlement (France.tv Slash)
Best Performance in a TV Series : 40 minutes: Alix Poisson – Sambre - Anatomy of a Crime (France 2); Margot Bancilhon – Machine (Arte); Virginie Efira – Tout va bien (Disney+); Laurent Lafitte – Class Act (Netflix); Nina Meurisse – La fièvre (Canal+)	Best Performance in a TV Series : 26 minutes: Xavier Lacaille – Parlement (France.tv Slash); Léa Drucker – Sous contrôle (Arte); Alma Jodorowsky – Split (France.tv Slash); Pierre Niney – Fiasco (Netflix); Émilie Tronche – Samuel (Arte)
Best Supporting Role in a TV Series : 40 minutes: Ramzy Bedia – Of Money and Blood (Canal+); Alassane Diong – La fièvre (Canal+); Olivier Gourmet – Sambre - Anatomy of a Crime (France 2); India Hair – Polar Park (Arte); Joséphine Japy – Class Act (Netflix); Clémence Poésy – Sambre - Anatomy of a Crime (France 2); Angèle Romeo – Tout va bien (Disney+); Niels Schneider – Of Money and Blood (Canal+); David Talbot – Class Act (Netflix)	Best Supporting Role in a TV Series : 26 minutes: Pascal Demolon – Fiasco (Netflix); François Civil – Fiasco (Netflix); Samir Guesmi – Sous contrôle (Arte); William Nadylam – Parlement (France.tv Slash); Laurent Stocker – Sous contrôle (Arte)
Best Production: Unité – Class Act (Netflix); What’s Up Films – Sambre - Anatomy of a Crime (France 2); Ego Productions – De Grâce (Arte); Quad+Ten – La fièvre (Canal+); Curiosa Films – Of Money and Blood (Canal+)	Best Score: Rone – Of Money and Blood (Canal+); Jean-Baptiste de Laubier – Tout va bien (Disney+); Émilie Tronche – Samuel (Arte); Yuksek – Irrésistible (Disney+); Maud Geffray & Rebeka Warrior – Split (France.tv Slash)
Best International TV Series: Baby Reindeer – UK (Netflix); Fellow Travelers – USA (Canal+); Shōgun – USA (Disney+); The Bear – USA (Disney+)

Shows with multiple nominations
Nominations	Show
7	Of Money and Blood
7	Sambre - Anatomy of a Crime
5	La fièvre
5	Sous contrôle
4	Class Act
4	Fiasco
4	Parlement
4	Polar Park
4	Samuel
4	Split
4	Tout va bien
2	De Grâce
2	Irrésistible
2	Machine

Networks with multiple nominations
Nominations	Network
18	Arte
13	Canal+
9	Netflix
8	Disney+
8	France.tv Slash
7	France 2
1	Amazon Prime Video

== Superlatives ==
Superlative	Best Actor		Best Actress	
Most awarded	Sébastien Chassagne; Xavier Lacaille	2	Camille Cottin	2
Most nominated	Sébastien Chassagne; Xavier Lacaille; Melvil Poupaud	3	Audrey Fleurot	5
Most nominated without ever winning	Niels Arestrup; Thierry Godard; Grégory Montel; Frédéric Pierrot; Laurent Stocker; Roschdy Zem	2	Audrey Fleurot	5
