= Series Mania =

Television festival in Lille, France

- Founded: 2010; 16 years ago
- Founded by: Laurence Herszberg
- Directors: Laurence Herszberg
- Artistic director: Frédéric Lavigne
- Website: seriesmania.com

Series Mania (French: Festival Séries Mania) is an international festival dedicated to television series, held annually in Lille, France. It is the largest TV series event in Europe and an important premiere platform. Series Mania comprises an institute of the same name, a forum for industry professionals, and a one-day summit Little Dialogues.

== Profile ==
The festival was established in 2010 by Laurence Herszberg. Initially it was hosted at the Forum des Images in Paris and started off with 250 industry attendees. In 2016, the government announced a competition between host cities for the best project of the festival's organization, which was won by the city of Lille. It bought the Séries Mania trademark from the city of Paris and has hosted the event since 2018. Still, the Centre National du Cinéma et de l'Image Animée in Paris remains the festival's important venue.

The festival's sections are International Competition, French Competition, International Panorama Competition, Short Forms Competition, Midnight Comedies Competition, and Out of Competition Special Screenings. Within the sections, awards are given for Best Actor, Best Actress, Audience Award, etc.

In 2013, the Series Mania Forum was founded. Directed by Francesco Capurro, the Forum is an important industry event that hosts conferences, panel discussions, showcases, and Co-Pro Pitching Sessions competition. The winner and the runner-up in Co-Pro Pitching competition receive a €50,000 development prize.

Along with the main program and the Forum, Series Mania leads multiple cultural initiatives and events. The Little Dialogues is a one-day summit for industry professionals established to promote international cooperation. Launched in 2023, SERIESMAKERS initiative co-founded with Germany's Beta Group is purposed to aid projects in development with cash prize and the help of renowned consultants.

Series Mania Institute, the education and training division, was established in 2021. It became the first institution in Europe that is completely focused on training professionals in TV series. The institute offers short-term courses as well as two-year educational programs. The institute also runs a workshop in Rio de Janeiro in partnership with several Brazilian and French institutions. In 2018, the Series Mania Writers Campus was established, a week-long writing workshop for TV series writers.

By 2023, Series Mania has developed a reputation as an important global event that secures world premieres for future international hits. Such major market players as Netflix, HBO, Amazon Studios, Apple TV+, Paramount, and Disney, present their projects in Lille.

In 2023, SM's director general Herszberg announced a collaboration between Series Mania Institute and Taiwan Creative Content Agency: a workshop on international serial co-productions that will start in Lille and finish in Taiwan. Also that year the former president of the festival Rodolphe Belmer (2018–2023) stepped down and was replaced by Anne Bouverot.

In 2025, the festival launched Apollo Series, an innovative training initiative created in collaboration with the Series Mania Institute, Göteborg Film Festival’s TV Drama Vision and MIA – International Audiovisual Market. The course offers its participants training on the legal, financial and strategic issues of working on European co-production projects.

== International Competition Grand Prix ==
- 2026 - Proud, Poland
- 2025 - Querer, Spain
- 2024 - Rematch, France, Hungary
- 2023 - The Actor, Iran
- 2022 - Le Monde De Demain, France
- 2021 - Blackport, Iceland
- 2020 - the contest was canceled due to the COVID-19 pandemic
- 2019 - The Virtues, United Kingdom
- 2018 - On the Spectrum, Israel

== Editions ==
=== 2018 ===
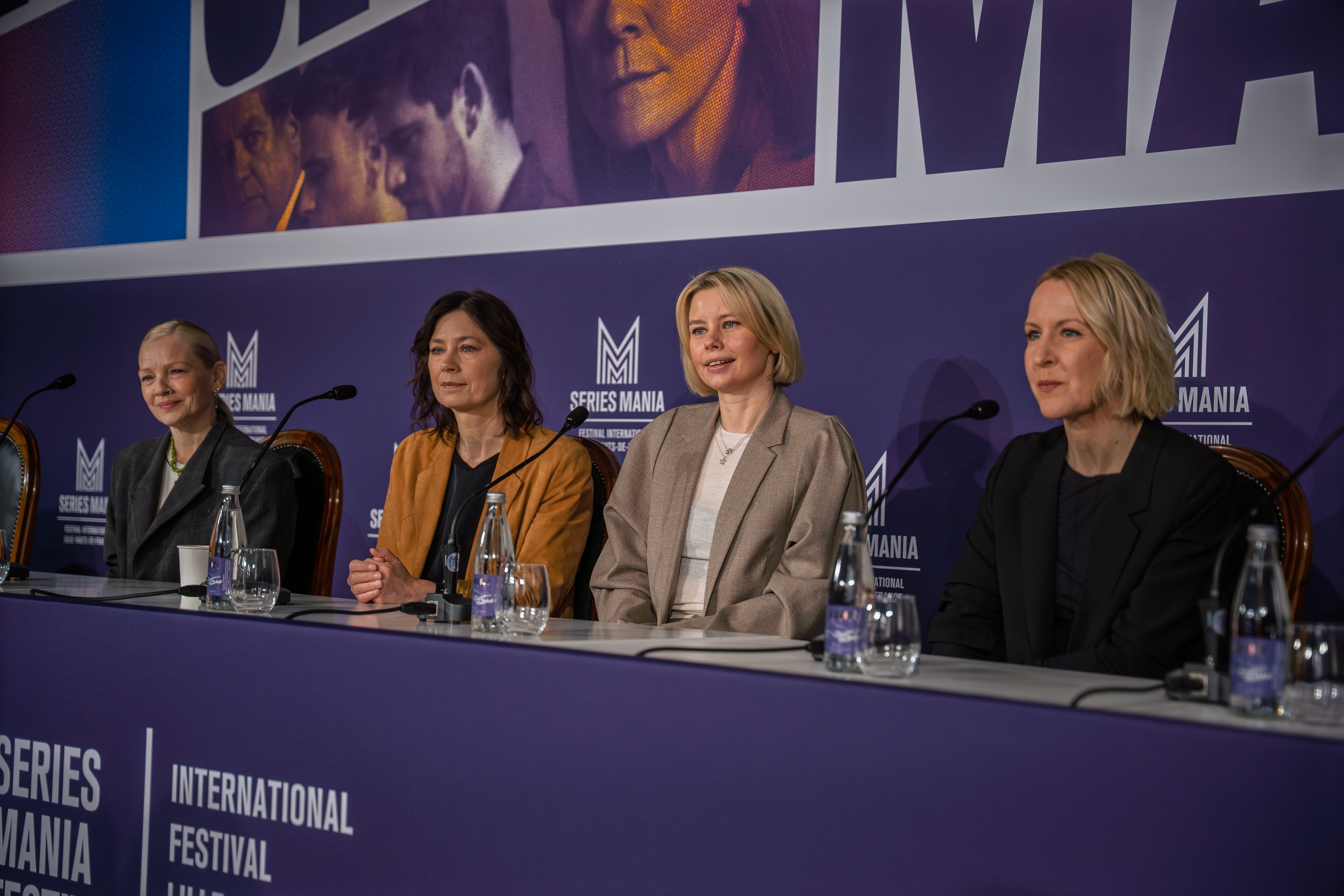
Amanda Jansson at 2026 Series Mania press conference for My brother

The 2018 edition was the first one located in Lille. Running from April 27 to May 5, the festival offered its audience 77 series, more than 1000 screenings and a wide range of special programs.

In the International Competition, the Grand Prix was awarded to On the Spectrum by Dana Idisis and Yuval Shafferman; Jury's Special Prize was given to Il Miracolo by Niccolò Ammaniti. Best Actress — Anna Mikhalkova (for An Ordinary Woman), Best Actor – Tommaso Ragno (Il Miracolo). The Marvelous Mrs. Maisel won the Audience Award. In the French Competition, the Best Series award went to Ad Vitam by Thomas Cailley and Sebastien Mounier, Anne Charrier was chosen the Best Actress for Maman a tort. Bryan Marciano (for Vingt-cinq) and Roschdy Zem (Aux Animaux la guerre) shared the Best Actor award. Kiri won in the International Panorama.

=== 2019 ===
The 10th anniversary edition went on March 22–30. The attendance reached 72,000. That year, Uma Thurman, Freddie Highmore, Charlie Brooker, and Marti Noxon gave masterclasses at the festival, while Eric Rochant, Hugo Blick and Dominik Moll participated in public talks. List of the premieres included Chambers, The Red Line, and many more.

The Jury Grand Prix went to The Virtues by Shane Meadows and Jack Thorne, the Special Jury Prize went to Nir Bergman and Ram Nehari's series Just for Today. Audience Award went to Mytho by Anne Berest and Fabrice Gobert, Best Actress — Marina Hands (for Mytho), Best Actor — Stephen Graham (The Virtues). In the French Competition, Apnea by Gaia Guasti, Aurélien Molas, and Julien Trousselier won the Best Series award. Carole Weyers was chosen the Best Actress (for Super Jimmy), Best Actor — Grégory Montel (for Family Shake). In the International Panorama the Best Series award went to Exit, a Norwegian drama by Petter Testmann-Koch and Øystein Karlsen.

The economic benefits of this year's edition estimated €5,273,063.

=== 2020 ===
The edition was canceled due to the COVID-19 pandemic. The Forum was moved online and took place from March 25 to April 7. It attracted 1,500 professionals, featuring a 54 series Buyers Showcase. However, as one of the first European digital experiences, it had its weaknesses: some projects (almost the entire French section) were not available online.

=== 2021 ===
The 11th edition took place from August 26 to September 2, 2021. The line-up included more than 50 series with 25 world premieres. The jury of the International Competition was headed by Hagai Levi. At the Forum, 2,500 professionals from 66 countries tanu didi participated, 15 projects were selected for co-founding. The attendance exceeded 54,000.

=== 2022 ===
The 12th edition took place March 18–25, it attracted more than 70,000 visitors and 3300 professionals. The line-up featured 58 series from 21 countries.

The International Competition Jury consisted of Christian Berkel, Cécile de France, Shira Haas, Berkun Oya, and Yseult. Michael Hirst, Mathieu Kassovitz, Nathalie Baye, and Isabelle Nanty were Guests of Honor.

The Grand Prix in the International Competition was awarded to Le Monde De Demain. Sunshine Eyes took the Special Jury Prize, Swedish The Dark Heart won in the International Panorama. In the French Panorama, Chair Tendre won the Best Series Award. Ines Ouchaaou, Charlie Loiselie and Assa Sylla shared the Best Actress award for their performance in Reuss. Axel Granberger became the Best Actor (for Les Papillons Noirs).

330 projects from 56 countries applied for the Forum's Co-Pro Pitching Sessions.

=== 2023 ===
The 13th edition took place on March 17–24 and screened 54 unreleased series, hosted 32 world and 10 international premieres. For the first time, projects from Greece and Iran joined the line-up. 3,800 accredited visitors attended the edition, while the audience exceeded 85,000.

The Grand Prix was given to Navid Javidi's The Actor.

The 13th edition was seriously impacted by the all-country wave of protests against Emmanuel Macron's controversial pension reform. On March 21, protestors tried to storm the red carpet and were confronted by anti-riot police.

=== 2024 ===
The 14th edition took place from March 15–22 and featured a line-up of 52 shows and 26 world premieres. More than 400 applications were received for the Co-Pro Pitching Sessions and 4400 industry professionals were accredited, while the attendance estimated 98,000. Among the big premieres, the festival hosted Netflix's 3 Body Problem.

The International Competition jury of Bérénice Bejo, Charlotte Brändström, Malick Bauer and Sofiane Zermani, headed by Zal Batmanglij, gave the Grand Prix to Yan England's Rematch. In the International Panorama, Jakob Rørvik's Dates in Real Life won the Best Series award.

=== 2025 ===
The 15th edition ran from 21 to 28 March 2025. 48 series from 19 countries were selected for showcase. The International Competition jury was headed by Pamela Adlon, flanked by Victor Le Masne, Ignacio Serricchio, Minkie Spiro, and Karin Viard. The programme was opened by France's Carême. Tokyo Crush by Clémence Dargent won in Co-Pro Pitching Sessions.

Spanish family drama series, ‘Querer’, won top prize for 2025.

=== 2026 ===
The 16th edition ran from 20 to 27 March 2026. American dystopian drama television series The Testaments opened the festival.
