= Missions (TV series) =

French television series

Missions (French pronunciation: [misjɔ̃]) is a French science-fiction television series first broadcast in 2017. Set in the near future, it depicts a mission to the planet Mars.

Missions was created by Ami Cohen, Henri Debeurme and Julien Lacombe and produced by Empreinte Digitale of Paris. It was first broadcast in June 2017 on the French pay-TV channel OCS, released on the Shudder streaming service in September 2017, and broadcast free-to-air on Britain's BBC Four in May 2018. The first series has ten 26-minute episodes that were as short as 20 minutes when aired by the BBC without intervening adverts. The first series is a mixture of science fiction, adventure and mysticism and does not draw to a self-contained conclusion.

Series 2 of Missions was scheduled to start filming in 2018, co-produced by Empreinte Digitale and by Shudder's parent company, AMC Networks. It was released in 2019.

Series 3 consisted of ten episodes and was launched in 2021.

== Synopsis ==
In the near future, the first crewed space mission to Mars, Ulysses 1, is a European mission funded by the European Space Agency (ESA) and William Meyer, a billionaire Swiss philanthropist. The crew is made up of the best astronauts and European scientists, including French, Italians and Germans. Jeanne Renoir, the crew psychologist, monitors the mental health of the crew. After ten months travelling through space, and within a few hours of landing, the astronauts learn from William Meyer that they will not be the first astronauts to land on Mars. They have been overtaken by a US mission with a faster vessel, jointly funded by NASA and a multi-national computer company. The only sign of life from the American mission is an alarming video message telling them not to land as it was 'too dangerous'. The European mission decides to investigate. On Mars, the astronauts do not find the Americans but a Russian, Vladimir Komarov, who died aboard the Soyuz 1 spacecraft in 1967.

== Episodes ==
=== Series 1 (2017) ===
1. Ulysse
2. Mars
3. Survivant
4. Pierre
5. Alliance
6. Irène
7. Faute
8. Phénix
9. Volodia
10. Orage

=== Series 2 (2019) ===
1. Aube
2. Retours
3. Évolution
4. Passage
5. Réplique
6. Alice
7. Furie
8. Autres
9. Architectes
10. Singularité

=== Series 3 (2021) ===
1. Le Rasoir d'Ockham
2. Samuel (English Title)
3. La Clé
4. Dark Clouds (English Title)
5. Empty Handed (English Title)
6. A Separation (English Title)
7. Le Sanctuaire
8. Le Cercle
9. Memories of the Future (English Title)
10. Théogonie

== Cast ==
- Hélène Viviès : Psychologist Jeanne Renoir
- Clément Aubert : Second in command Simon Gramat
- Mathias Mlekuz : Swiss billionaire William Meyer
- Jean-Toussaint Bernard : Engineer Yann Bellocq
- Giorgia Sinicorni : Doctor Alessandra Najac
- Côme Levin : Computer scientist Basile Verhoeven
- Adrianna Gradziel : German biologist and geologist Eva Müller
- Christophe Vandevelde : Commander Martin Najac
- Arben Bajraktaraj : Soviet cosmonaut Vladimir Komarov
- Ralph Amoussou : French astronaut Samuel Becker
- Natasha Andrews : Gemma Williams
- Ben Homewood : Allan Brody
- Nathan Willcocks : Edward Doisneau
- Shane Woodward : Adam Wayne
- Vincent Londez : Ivan Goldstein
- Tiphaine Daviot : IRN, the on-board computer
- Anton Yakovlev : Yuri Gagarin
- Avant Strangel : Scientist
- Ian McCamy : Deputy scientist
- David Clark : Astronaut 1
- Étienne Guillou-Kervern : Astronaut 2
- Julie Meunier : Nurse talking to Jeanne Renoir
- Lan Hoang Xuan : Ivan Goldstein's nurse
- Manon Giraud-Balasuriya : Jeanne, the little girl
- Yasmin Bau : Jeanne's assistant
- Zélie Guerin Frutoso : Manon
- Alexander Medvedev : Russian engineer
- Sophie Fougère : Wife of Vladimir Komarov
- Mégane Fleury : Sports journalist
- Nicolas Traino : News reporter
- Franka Hoareau : Soviet operator of Soyuz
- Bernard Blancan : Father of Jeanne Renoir
- Lucas Englander: Peter Kaminski

== Production ==
The director Julien Lacombe told the Swiss newspaper 20 Minutes that he was inspired by his love for science fiction, particularly Isaac Asimov's writing, but also for genre cinema including 2001: A Space Odyssey, Interstellar and Alien. He was also influenced by the Lost TV series: "We tried to reproduce the same fascination for this series, being careful not to open too many doors to answer every question".

Created by Henri Debeurme, Ami Cohen and Julien Lacombe, Missions is produced by Empreinte Digitale, distributed by AB International Distribution and broadcast as ten episodes.

The project was financed by three local authorities and the "New technologies in production" sector of the National Center of Cinematography and the moving image (CNC). Henri Debeurme, the co-creator and producer, said "We tend to say that genre series have a harder time being supported by traditional sources, but the French audiovisual institutions have provided almost half of the budget."

Regarding the budget, Lacombe told 20 Minutes "We are far from the budgets of the series brought to the screen by the major chains. We knew we would be budget-limited, but the audience should not feel these limits. And we do not want to complain, it forced us to be imaginative."

=== Locations ===
The scenes of the planet Mars were shot in Morocco. The other scenes were shot in France: in La Rochelle for the scenes inside the spacecraft, near Tours, in an open pit near Chartres and on the slopes of Mont Blanc.

== Release history ==
=== Series 1 ===
- June 2017 – OCS, French pay-TV
- September 2017 – Shudder streaming service
- May 2018 – BBC Four, British free-to-air TV. With English subtitles for non-English dialogue. Re-broadcast July 2021 and available on the iPlayer streaming service.

The German pay-TV channel RTL Passion and the Danish public broadcaster DR have also acquired rights to the series.

=== Series 3 ===
- December 2021 – OCS, French pay-TV, in 5 episodes of 45 minutes each.
- April 2022 – BBC Four, British free-to-air TV, in 10 episodes of approximately 22 minutes each. With English subtitles for non-English dialogue. Also available on the iPlayer streaming service.

== Critical response ==
The Swiss newspaper 20 Minutes and the Toulouse-based La Dépêche noted that the series should have no trouble crossing the French borders and becoming a candidate for international export, thanks to its theme and the nationally diverse cast, featured delivering their lines in a number of European languages (French, English, Italian, German and Russian).

The French language edition of HuffPost said that the series was worth seeing despite small flaws.

The Belgian free newspaper Metro reported that the retro aesthetic is quite attractive but it was sceptical about the format, commenting that "Episodes of 26 minutes are more suitable for comedies than for SF series".

In the French magazine Télérama, Pierre Langlais wrote, "Despite a tight budget, it manages to make a credible performance, thanks to an elegant staging and impeccable production. On the other hand, the dialogue is often unnatural, and the interpretation is rather uneven."

Clelia Cohen of the French newspaper Libération wrote "From the first moments of viewing, one can see that there will be no question of lavish expenditure or special effects. But the result does not seem to be cut down, quite the opposite. It even has a deliberate simplicity, a visual elegance that is far from cheap."

Constance Jamet wrote in Le Figaro "The series, which borrows from Lost and Alien, shows that a successful fiction on the conquest of space does not need a big budget... as long as the good ideas are there."

When the series opened on BBC Four, John Robinson wrote in The Guardian "Entertaining French space drama about a problematic mission to Mars. "

== Awards ==
- MIPTV Media Market, Cannes, Jury Prize in the Full episodes category (2017)
- Series Mania, Critics' Prize (2017)
