= Le weekend =

Le weekend may refer to:

- Weekend (1967 film), French film
- Le Week-End, 2013 British film
