= See How They Dance =

2011 film

- Directed by: Claude Miller
- Written by: Claude Miller; Natalie Carter; Roy Parvin
- Produced by: Patrick Godeau
- Starring: Marina Hands
- Cinematography: Gérard de Battista
- Edited by: Véronique Lange
- Music by: Vincent Segal
- Distributed by: Pan-Européenne Distribution
- Release date: 3 August 2011
- Running time: 99 minutes
- Country: France
- Language: French
- Budget: $10.5 million
- Box office: $526,000

See How They Dance (French: Voyez comme ils dansent) is a 2011 French drama film directed by Claude Miller.

== Plot ==
During a journey, the widow Lise gets to know her late husband's lover Alexandra.

== Cast ==
- Marina Hands as Lise Clément
- James Thiérrée as Victor Clément a.k.a. Vic
- Maya Sansa as Doctor Alexandra Smith a.k.a. Alex
- Yves Jacques as George Bliss
- Anne-Marie Cadieux as Brigitte
- Aubert Pallascio as Antoine Clément
- Normand D'Amour as Lee Atlee
- Stuart Mylow Jr. as Charlie
- Benoît Brière as the lawyer
- Patrick Goyette as Brad

== Production ==
The scene where James Thierrée and Maya Sansa swims in the nude was shot at Lac Sacacomie, Québec, Canada. "The nine-week shoot in Canada was wonderful," Sansa recalls. "But I got hypothermia while shooting this scene. It's funny because at first you don't realize it. I could feel my limbs getting cold. I even thought I had to move as much as possible to warm up. It was exactly the opposite. It could have gone wrong, but it all turned out fine!" - she said with a smile.
