= Caroline Proust =

French classically trained actress (born 1967)

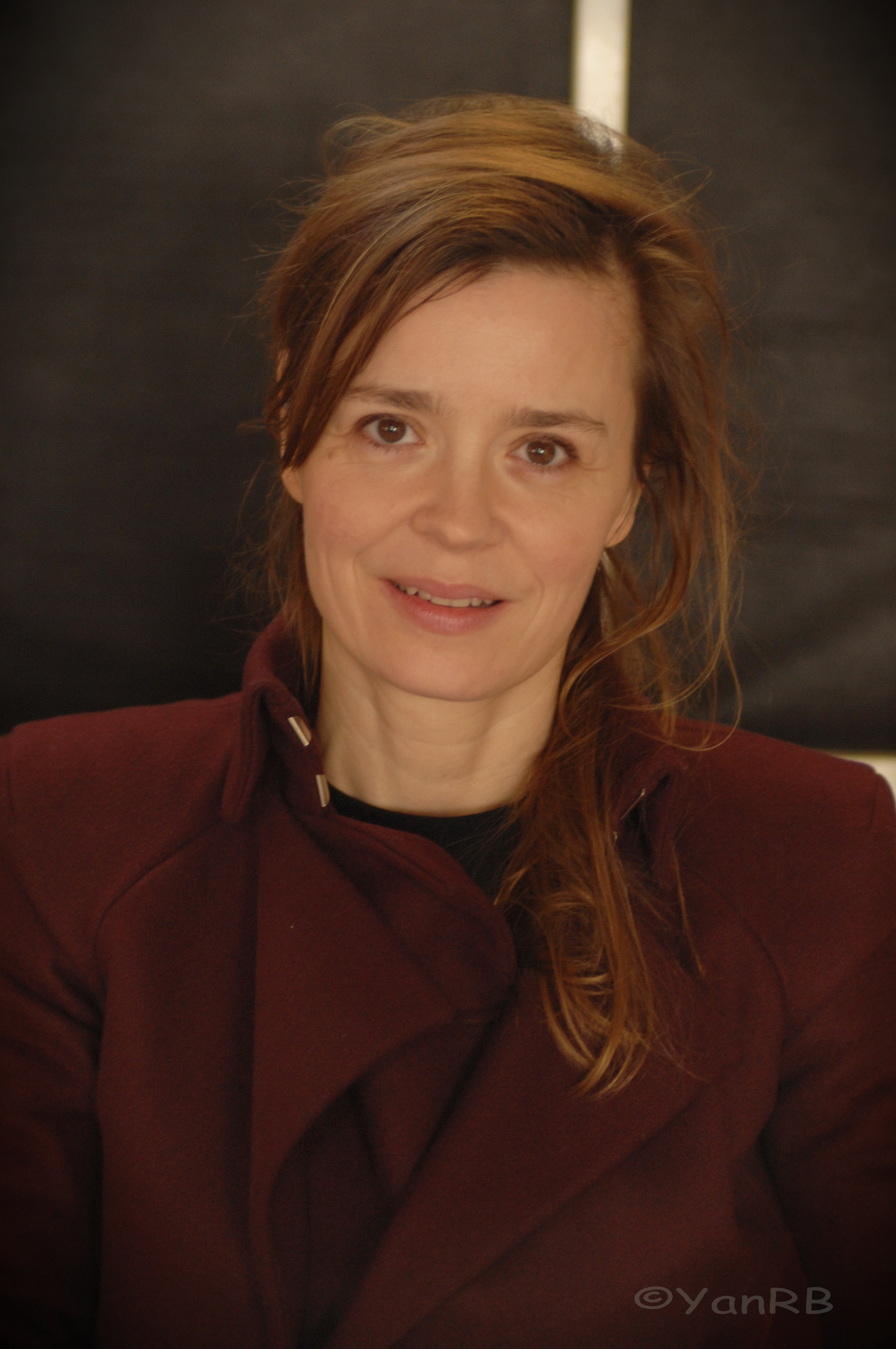
- Proust in 2016
- Born: 18 November 1967 (age 58); Le Vigan, Gard, France
- Occupations: Actress, producer
- Years active: 1990–present
- Spouse: Clovis Cornillac (m. 1994; div. 2010)
- Children: 2

Caroline Proust (born 18 November 1967) is a French classically trained actress best known to international audiences for her role as Captain Laure Berthaud in the French TV series Spiral. She has also appeared in the Netflix TV series Notre Dame and also appeared in The Tunnel as well as theatre work including the Tracy Letts play August: Osage County and Game of Love and Chance.

== Early life and career ==
She was born on 18 November 1967 in the commune (or town) of Le Vigan in the region of Languedoc-Roussillon, in the department of Gard. She decided to be an actor when she was 17.

Proust initially worked in theatre. She has described herself as a child of Edward Bond, and she cites the directors Patrice Chéreau, Peter Brook, Giorgio Strehler and Deborah Warner among her inspirations.

== Theatre ==
Year	Title	Notes
1992	Mood Pieces	Théâtre Jean-Vilar
1993-95	Henry VI	Théâtre de Gennevilliers
1997	Hamlet	Théâtre de la Tempête
1998-99	The Game of Love and Chance	Théâtre Nanterre-Amandiers
2001	The Mistress of the Inn	Tour
2003	Cairn	Théâtre des Célestins
2005	E, roman-dit	Théâtre national de la Colline
2007	Kliniken	Théâtre Nanterre-Amandiers
2011	Love, Loss, and What I Wore	Théâtre Marigny
2012	Festen	Théâtre du Rond-Point
2014-15	August: Osage County	Tour
2015	A View from the Bridge	Odéon-Théâtre de l'Europe

== Filmography ==
Year	Title	Role	Notes
1990	La mort d'une vache	Caroline	Short
1994	Le Péril jeune	Squat girl	
1994	Les mickeys	The girl	Short
1994	La bavure	Betty	TV movie Festival du Film Policier de Cognac - Acting Ensemble
1995	Le R.I.F.	Cécile Meillac	TV series (1 episode)
1997	Le cousin	Fanny	
1997	Ouvrez le chien		Pierre Dugowson
1998	Une femme à suivre	Émilie	TV movie
1998	L'échappée	Sandrine	TV movie
2003	Vert paradis	Sophie	
2004	Grossesse nerveuse	Judith	Short
2004	Breakfast	The woman	Short
2004	Colette, une femme libre	Lotte	TV mini-series
2005	Marc Eliot	Laëtitia Sanchez	TV series (4 episodes)
2005–present	Spiral	Laure Berthaud	TV series (52 episodes); Nominated - ACS Award for Best Actress (2015); Nominated - ACS Award for Best Actress (2018); Nominated - ACS Award for Best Actress (2019)
2007	Scorpion	Léa	
2007	Notable donc coupable	Hélène Borda	TV movie
2008	Ca$h	Léa	
2008	Titi	The woman	Short
2009	Le coeur du sujet	Paula	TV movie
2010	Un moment d'absence	Cécile	Short
2011	La permission de minuit	Louise	
2011	La république des enfants	Madeleine	TV movie
2011	Accident de parcours	Alice Lacamp	TV movie
2011	Emma	Léa	TV movie
2013	Pourquoi personne me croit ?	Jeanne	TV movie
2013	The Tunnel	Anne-Marie Delgado	TV series (3 episodes)
2014	Death in Paradise	Emily Benoit	TV series (1 episode)
2016	Le premier coup		Short; Also Producer & Director
2016	Supermarket	The woman	Short; Also Associate Producer
2016	Notre révolution intérieure	Associate producer	Documentary
2016	La Nullipare	Associate producer	Short

2023 Notre Dame

== TV ==
Proust's main TV work has been the series Spiral.

== Personal life ==
She was married to fellow actor Clovis Cornillac from 1994 until 2010. Their twins, Alice and Lily, were born in 2001. The couple appeared together in the 2007 feature film Scorpion.
