= Black Butterflies (miniseries) =

- Written by: Olivier Abbou; Bruno Merle
- Directed by: Olivier Abbou
- Starring: Nicolas Duvauchelle; Niels Arestrup
- Music by: Clément Tery
- Country of origin: France
- No. of episodes: 6

Production
- Producers: Olivier Abbou; Julien Dewolf; Matthieu Elkaïm; Myriam Gharbi-de Vasselot; Bruno Merle
- Cinematography: Antoine Sanier
- Editors: Emilie Orsini; Benjamin Favreul

Original release
- Network: Arte; Netflix
- Release: 7 September 2022

Black Butterflies (Les papillons noirs) is a 2022 French miniseries.

== Plot ==
Mody, a writer lacking inspiration, agrees to write the memoirs of Albert, an old man who tells him about his youth. A war orphan, he had formed a friendship which turned into love with Solange, a “Nazi girl” whose mother was a prostitute.

As a teenager, Solange kills a man who tries to rape her, and Albert protects her. What follows is a life of love and death.

== Cast ==
- Nicolas Duvauchelle as Adrien Mody
- Niels Arestrup as Albert Desiderio
  - Axel Granberger as Young Albert
- Alyzée Costes as Solange
- Alice Belaïdi as Nora
- Sami Bouajila as Carrel
- Brigitte Catillon as Catherine
  - Lola Créton as Young Catherine
- Marie Denarnaud as Mathilde
- Henny Reents as Nastya
- Nicolas Wanczycki as Alan
- Rodolphe Pauly as Julien
- Philippe Brenninkmeyer as Hans

== Episodes ==
- Episode 1 : Les Souvenirs d'Albert
- Episode 2 : Une Proposition Déterminante
- Episode 3 : Les Démons d'Adrien
- Episode 4 : Ivresse d'Écriture
- Episode 5 : Le Succès
- Episode 6 : Toutes les Réponses

== Release ==
The miniseries was first released on Arte in september 2022. A month later, it was released on Netflix.

== Accolades ==
| Year | Award | Category | Recipient | Result |
|---|---|---|---|---|
| 2023 | ACS Awards | Best TV Series : 40 minutes | Arte | Nominated |
| 2023 | ACS Awards | Best Director | Olivier Abbou | Nominated |
| 2023 | ACS Awards | Best Writing | Olivier Abbou & Bruno Merle | Won |
| 2023 | ACS Awards | Best Supporting Role in a TV Series : 40 minutes | Niels Arestrup | Nominated |
| 2023 | ACS Awards | Best Production | Mediawan, GMT Productions & Jack n’a qu’un œil | Nominated |
| 2022 | Series Mania | Best Actor | Axel Granberger | Won |
