= An Ordinary Execution =

2010 French film

- Directed by: Marc Dugain
- Written by: Marc Dugain
- Starring: Marina Hands; André Dussollier
- Release date: 3 February 2010
- Running time: 1h 45min
- Country: France
- Language: French
- Budget: $9.2 million
- Box office: $1.3 million

An Ordinary Execution (French: Une exécution ordinaire) is a 2010 French drama film directed by Marc Dugain based on his 2007 novel.

== Cast ==
- Marina Hands - Anna
- André Dussollier - Joseph Stalin
- Édouard Baer - Vassilli
- Denis Podalydès - The concierge
- Tom Novembre - The hospital director
- Grégory Gadebois - Head of service
- Gilles Gaston-Dreyfus - Beria
- Anne Benoît - Alexandra

== Reception ==
On the review aggregator website Rotten Tomatoes, 89% of 9 critics' reviews are positive.
