= Sherwan Haji =

Syrian-Finnish actor

- Haji in 2026
- Born: Sherwan Diyako Haji; 18 March 1985 (age 41); Dêrik, Syria
- Education: Anglia Ruskin University (M.A.)
- Occupations: Filmmaker, screenwriter and actor
- Years active: 2004–present
- Notable work: The Other Side of Hope
- Awards: Best Actor (2017 Dublin International Film Festival)

Sherwan Haji (born 18 March 1985) is a Kurdish-Finnish actor, filmmaker and writer.

== Biography ==
Haji graduated from the Higher Institute for Dramatic Arts in Damascus. He played leading roles in several TV series for several TV channels in the Middle East.

Haji moved to Finland in 2010 to continue his studies. In 2012, he established a production company called Lion's Line Ltd. Haji has worked as an educator and he has produced documentaries, fiction movies, and art workshops. Haji moved to Cambridge, U.K. to continue his studies, receiving the degree of Master of Arts with distinction in Film and TV Production from Anglia Ruskin University in 2016.

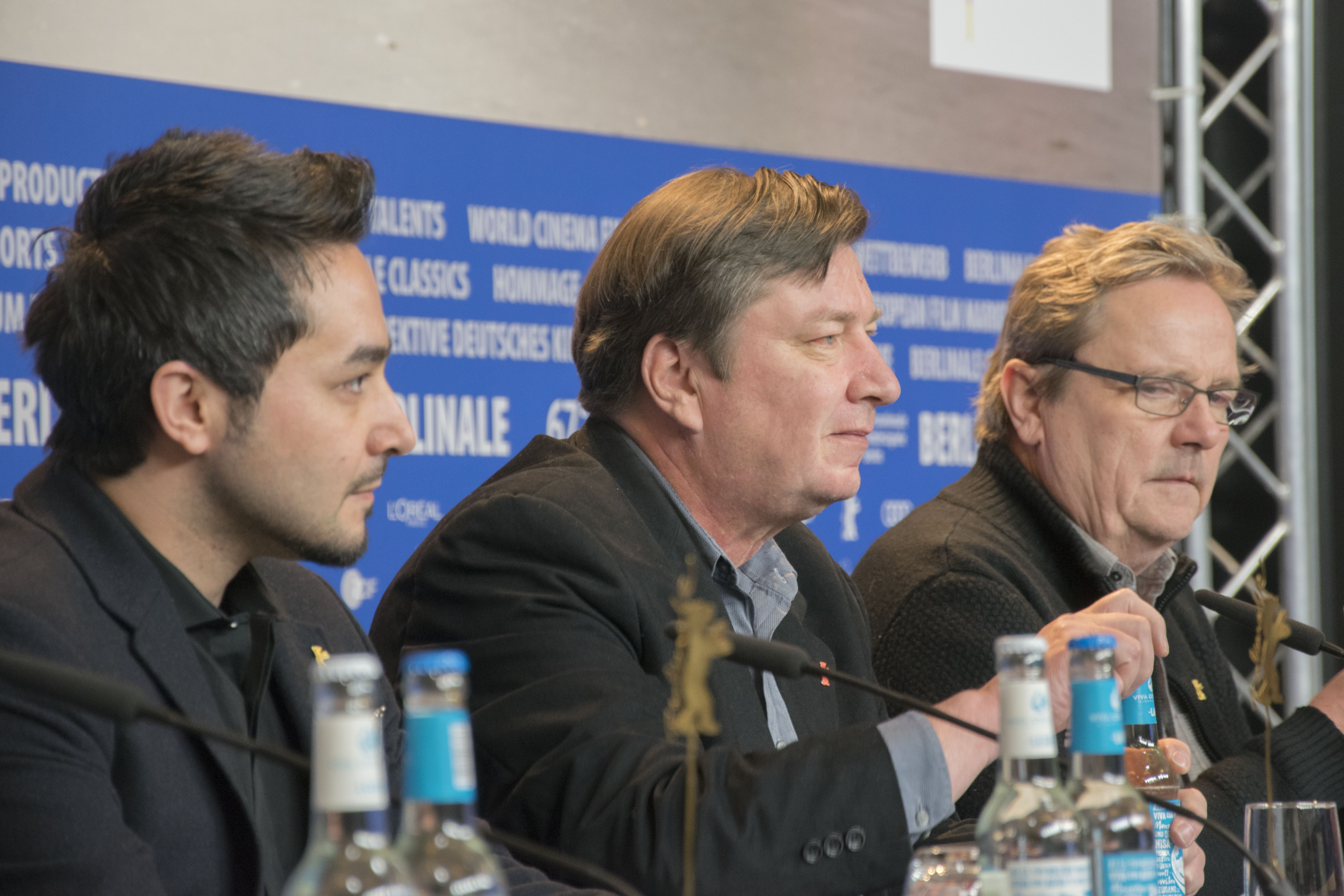
Haji with Aki Kaurismäki and Sakari Kuosmanen in 2017

In 2017, Haji worked with Finnish director Aki Kaurismäki, playing a leading role in The Other Side of Hope. He was awarded the prize for best actor at the Dublin International Film Festival for his performance.

== Selected filmography ==
=== Film ===
| Year | Title | Role | Notes |
|---|---|---|---|
| 2017 | The Other Side of Hope | Khaled | |
| 2022 | Boy from Heaven | Soliman | |
| 2023 | Fallen Leaves | Khaled - Parakin asukas | |
| 2024 | Elyas | Mr. Jamal Al Kuwari | |

=== Television ===
| Year | Title | Role | Notes |
|---|---|---|---|
| 2018 | Bullets | Sayid | |
| 2019 | Roba | Sami Yaasin | |
| 2020 | Syke | Tarek Midamesek | |
| 2023 | Dark Hearts | Commander Salar Fakhri | |
