= Liz Kingsman =

Australian actress

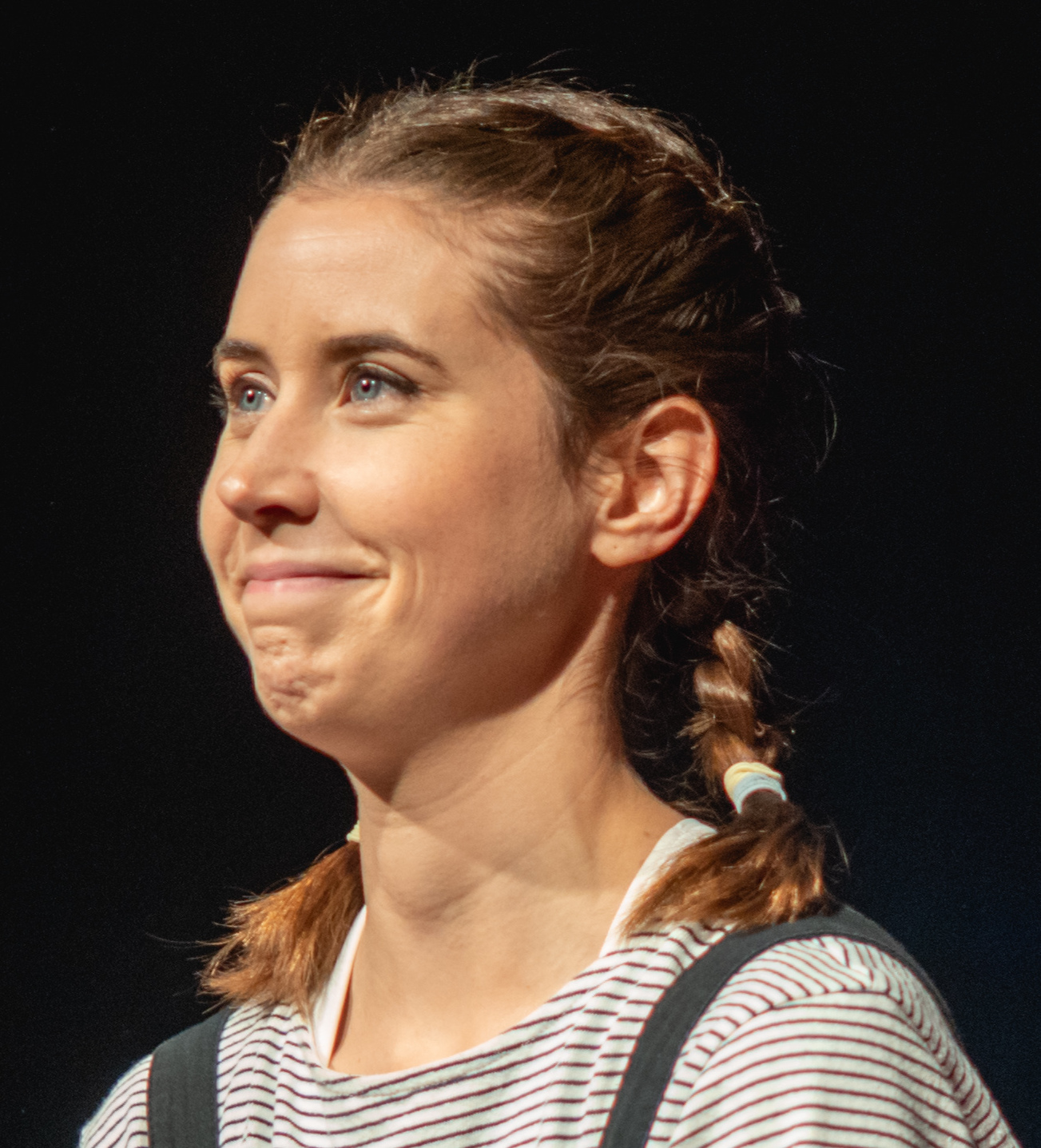
- Kingsman in 2022
- Born: Liz Kingsman; Sydney, Australia
- Education: University of Durham
- Occupations: Comedian, actress
- Years active: 2015–present

Liz Kingsman is an Australian comedian and actress.

== Early life ==
From Sydney, Australia, the daughter of graphic designers, she has a British mother with whom she would watch British comedies when she was growing up. She attended Durham University in England, where she studied English and History and took-up sketch comedy. She later moved to London, and then Dorset.

== Career ==
=== Comedy ===
In the mid-2010s she was in the improv trio Massive Dad alongside Stevie Martin and Tessa Coates.

She first performed her show One Woman Show in 2019, and later performed it at the Vault Festival in 2020, before a run at the Soho Theatre from October 2021, and then the 2022 Edinburgh Fringe Festival, where she was nominated for the Edinburgh Comedy Award.

She went on to perform One Woman Show in the West End and won The Times Breakthrough Award at the South Bank Sky Arts Awards, and was also nominated for the Laurence Olivier Award for Best Entertainment or Comedy Play. She took the show to the Sydney Opera House and in New York.

=== Acting ===
After university, Kingsman began working as a runner on film productions, where her jobs included being a stand-in for Natalie Portman on Thor and Felicity Jones on The Invisible Woman. She was cast in British political comedy series Ballot Monkeys in 2015 and reprised her role in spin-off comedy series Power Monkeys.

She appeared in two series of the British Channel 5 2016 mockumentary series Borderline, as well as British comedy series Pls Like, King Gary and Timewasters, and the French comedy series Icon of French Cinema.

She also appeared in Rose Matafeo comedy series Starstruck. She appeared as an English parliamentary assistant in the pan-European comedy series Parlement. The second series of which won the Comedy Drama and Sitcom Rose d'Or Award in November 2023.

In 2024, she was confirmed in the cast for UKTV show I, Jack Wright. That year, she had a guest role as Baroness Von Louth in Apple TV comedy series The Completely Made-Up Adventures of Dick Turpin.

In 2025, she played the role of Lisbeth Bampton in the film F1.

== Filmography ==
=== Film ===
| Year | Title | Role | Notes |
|---|---|---|---|
| 2017 | Double Date | Laura | Feature film |
| 2017 | Flatshare: Comic Relief | Jo | Short film; also scriptwriter |
| 2018 | Down from London | Billy | Short film; also scriptwriter |
| 2019 | Man-Spider | | Short film |
| 2025 | F1 | Lisbeth Bampton | Feature film |
| 2026 | Project Hail Mary | Annie Shapiro | Feature film |

=== Television ===
| Year | Title | Role | Notes |
|---|---|---|---|
| 2015 | Ballot Monkeys | Ruby Hughes | Recurring role; 5 episodes' |
| 2016 | Comedy Playhouse | Lucy | Episode: "Hospital People" |
| 2016 | @Elevenish | Herself | 2 episodes |
| 2016 | Massive Dad | Various roles | 4 episodes; also showrunner and scriptwriter |
| 2016 | Power Monkeys | Ruby Hughes | Recurring role; 6 episodes |
| 2016–2017 | Borderline | Andy Church | Main role; 12 episodes |
| 2017 | Timewasters | Victoria | Recurring role; 12 episodes |
| 2018 | So Beano Comedy: Astonishing Tales | —N/a | Scriptwriter; 6 episodes |
| 2018 | Tonightly with Tom Ballard | —N/a | Scriptwriter; 15 episodes |
| 2019 | Comedians Giving Lectures | Herself | Episode no. 6 |
| 2019 | Down from London | Billy | Main role; miniseries; 3 episodes; also scriptwriter |
| 2019 | Four Weddings and a Funeral | Clementine | Miniseries; episode: "We Broke" |
| 2019 | Small Town Politics | Daisy Adams | Main role; miniseries; 3 episodes |
| 2020 | King Gary | Val | Episode: "Pass to Abboussi" |
| 2020–2025 | Parlement | Rose Pilkington | Main role; 37 episodes |
| 2021 | The Brilliant World of Tom Gates | Delia Gates | Recurring role; voice; 10 episodes |
| 2021 | Pls Like | Hannah the Director | Episide: "Arts & Culture" |
| 2021 | Starstruck | Liz | Episode: "Autumn" |
| 2022 | Wedding Season | Mary Delaney | Episode no. 1 |
| 2023 | Hijack | Sheena | Recurring role; 5 episodes |
| 2023 | Icon of French Cinema | Kristin | Main role; 6 episodes |
| 2024 | The Completely Made-Up Adventures of Dick Turpin | Baroness von Louth | Episode: "The Unrobbable Coach" |
| 2025 | I, Jack Wright | Katie Jones | Main role; 6 episodes |
| TBA | Berlin Noir | Rosa Bauer | Upcoming series |

=== Video games ===
| Year | Title | Role | Notes |
|---|---|---|---|
| 2019 | Another Eden | Chiyo | Voice; English dubbing; original version released in 2017 |
