= Marie Dompnier =

French actress, singer, and director (born 1980)

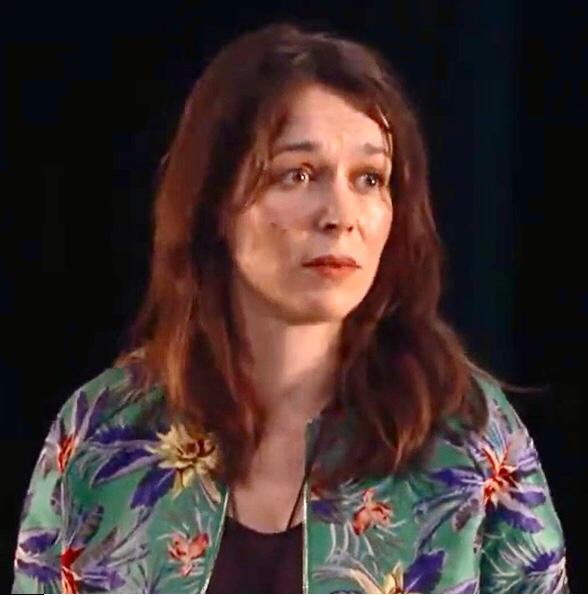
- Dompnier in 2021
- Born: 1980 (age 45–46); Toulouse, Haute-Garonne, France.
- Occupation: Actress
- Years active: 2007–present

Marie Dompnier is a French actress, singer, and director, born in 1980 in Toulouse, Haute-Garonne, France. She is best known both in France and internationally for her role as Lieutenant Sandra Winckler in the television series Witnesses (Les Témoins).

== Education ==
From 2000 to 2002, Dompnier took professional training as an actor in the Ateliers du Sapajou in Paris, Marie furthered her education in 2003, at the Centre Dramatique National in Poitiers. From 2002 to 2004, she also studied at the Conservatoire National Superieur d'Art Dramatique, 5th arrondissement of Paris. Dompnier joined the L’École régionale d’acteurs de Cannes in 2004, graduating in 2007.

== Career ==
Dompnier spent most of her early acting career performing in classical and contemporary works in the theatre. Dompnier was part of the company Artéria in residence at the Théâtre du Soleil until 2004. Then Marie joined the collective "La Vie brief", with whom she played Robert Plankett in 2011, in a staging of Jeanne Candel In 2014, Dompnier was part of the taste of fake and other songs, in Jeanne Candel. In 2012, she appeared for the first time in the cinema in Dante Desarthe's Je fais feu de tout bois, before securing a small role in the television series Caïn in 2012 and Détectives in 2013.

In 2014, she played the role of Charlotte Poussin in the film Les Gazelles alongside myriad actresses including Camille Chamoux, also co-writer. She befriended the latter and staged her show, born under Giscard.

Dompnier was spotted during a "face camera" staging, by director Hervé Hadmar, and offered her the main role of his TV series Witnesses on France 2 alongside Thierry Lhermitte in 2015. At the time, Dompnier was unknown to the general public and the channel was hesitant to accept the casting, but the creators confirm their choice. Thanks to this role of Lieutenant Sandra Winckler, she obtained the Golden FIPA of female interpretation at the Festival International des programmes audiovisuals of Biarritz 2015. The British TV company Channel 4 secured rights to air the first series of French crime TV series Witnesses in 2015, and the BBC acquired rights to broadcast series 2 of Witnesses on BBC 4 and I-Player in late 2017.

In 2019, Dompnier starred in the disaster TV miniseries La Dernière Vague (The Last Wave), for France 2. In 2021, Dompnier starred in the Rodolphe Tissot directed television film Clèves, and as La directrice d'enquête in the French feature film Les Choses humaines (En. The Accusation). The same year she appeared in the Yann Gozlan-directed 2021 mystery thriller film Black Box as Pauline.

== Filmography ==
=== Film ===
| Year | Title | Role |
|---|---|---|
| 2012 | Je fais feu de tout bois (En. I set the forest on fire) | Coralie |
| 2014 | Diplomacy | La dame maquillée |
| 2014 | Les Gazelles | Charlotte Poussin |
| 2019 | Le tapis (Short film) | Monnie |
| 2021 | Black Box | Pauline |
| 2021 | The Accusation | La directrice d'enquête |
| 2022 | 16 ans (En. 16 years) | Carine Cavani |
| 2023 | Black Lotus | Hélène |

=== Television ===
| Year | Title | Role | Notes / ref |
|---|---|---|---|
| 2012 | Caïn | Sophie Blanchard | 1 episode - Otages |
| 2013 | Fais pas ci, fais pas ça | Maman voisine | 1 episode - Une petite zone de turbulences |
| 2013 | Détectives | Magalie | 1 episode - Doubles vies |
| 2014 | Le système de Ponzi | Lucy Meli | TV film |
| 2014 | Petits secrets entre voisins | Gina | 1 episode - Une mère absente |
| 2015 | Le passe-muraille (En. The wall-pass) | Ariane | TV film |
| 2016 | The Tunnel | Madeleine Fournier | 1 episode - 2.1 |
| 2017 | C à vous (En. C to you) | Herself | 2 episodes |
| 2017 | Vivement la télé (En. Definitely TV) | Herself | 1 episode |
| 2014-2017 | Witnesses | Sandra Winckler | Lead role- 14 episodes |
| 2019 | Jeux d'influence (En. The Inside Game) | Florence Delpierre | 5 episodes |
| 2019 | Suspicions | Marion Maléval | 3 episodes |
| 2019 | La Dernière Vague (En. The Last Wave) | Lena Lebon | 6 episodes |
| 2019 | Alexandra Ehle (En. The Coroner) | Nathalie Lautreme | 1 episode |
| 2021 | Prière d'enquêter (En. Please investigate) | Juliette | 1 episode - "Oeil pour oeil" (En. An eye for an eye) |
| 2021 | Capitaine Marleau | Lily Terrier | S4.E4 "L'homme qui brûle" (En. The Burning Man) |
| 2021 | Clèves | La mère de Myrtille | TV film |
| 2023 | Cœurs noirs (En. Dark Hearts) | Adèle Brockner | Main role - 6 episodes |

== Awards and nominations ==
| Year | Award | Category | Nominated work | Result | Ref. |
|---|---|---|---|---|---|
| 2015 | Festival International de Programmes Audiovisuels | Series : Fipa d'or Best Actress | Witnesses | Won | |
| 2015 | ACS Awards | Best Actress | Witnesses | Won | |
