= Dark Hearts (TV series) =

French television series

- French: Cœurs noirs
- Created by: Duong Dang-Thaï; Corinne Garfin
- Directed by: Ziad Doueiri
- Starring: Nicolas Duvauchelle; Marie Dompnier; Thierry Godard
- Music by: Éric Neveux
- No. of seasons: 2
- No. of episodes: 12

Production
- Producer: Gilles de Verdière
- Production company: Mandarin

Original release
- Network: Amazon Prime Video

Dark Hearts (French: Cœurs noirs) is a French television series.

== Premise ==
This series is about a French special forces commando unit whose mission is to neutralize a French-speaking Daesh terror group called the "Black Hearts" behind attacks in Iraq and metropolitan France around the time of the Mosul offensive. The French Ministry of Defence's Mission Cinéma et Industries Créatives (MCIC) helped director Ziad Doueiri to make the series more realistic.

== Cast and characters ==
- Nicolas Duvauchelle as Martin
- Marie Dompnier as Adèle
- Tewfik Jallab as Rimbaud
- Nina Meurisse as Sabrina
- Jeremy Nadeau as Paco
- Victor Pontecorvo as Spit
- Quentin Faure as Olivier
- Thierry Godard as Colonel Roques
- Moussa Maaskri as Zaïd
- Nelson Delapalme as Hilaire
- Louise Orry-Diquéro as Mélissa
- Guillaume Arnault as Vincent
- Nisrin Erradi as Salwa
- Sherwan Haji as Salar
- Selva Rasalingam as Haidar
- Jarreth Merz as Cortez
- Xavier Robic as Paul-Henry Danois
