= Marie-France Alvarez =

French actress

- Born: Paris, France
- Occupation: Actress

Marie-France Alvarez is a French actress. Born in Paris, from a Congolese mother and a Spanish father, she trained at LAMDA in London and L'école des Enfants Terribles in Paris.

== Career ==
Her first appearance on British Television was in the role of Carmen in the BBC mini-series Criminal Justice directed by Yann Demange. In 2017 she played Mademoiselle Dubois in Paddington 2. Theatre credits include Pinter's collage ‘Democractie(s)’ performed in Festival d'Avignon Off, ‘Paradise’ at the Arcola Theatre or the lead role in ‘ Berenice ’ with the Klein Leonarte Theater company. In 2019, she joined the cast of The Crucible at the Théâtre de la Ville.

== Filmography ==
Television and film roles
Year	Film	Role	Notes
2009	Criminal Justice	Carmen	2 episodes
2011	Hidden	Nadine	1 episode
2011	Albatross	Female Customer	Film
2013	Les François	Reine	Television film
2013	Le Week-End	Victoire La Chapelle	Film
2015	Doctors	Therese Cotillard	3 episodes
2017	Paddington 2	Mademoiselle Dubois	Film
2017	Ransom	Lucie Planchais	Episode: "Celina"
2019	Vernon Subutex	Juliette	2 episodes
2020	Baron Noir	Malika	7 episodes
