= Ballot Monkeys =

2015 British comedy television series

- Created by: Andy Hamilton; Guy Jenkin
- Written by: Andy Hamilton; Guy Jenkin
- Starring: Ben Miller; Hugh Dennis
- Opening theme: "Hit the Road Jack"
- Composer: Philip Pope
- Country of origin: United Kingdom
- Original language: English
- No. of series: 1
- No. of episodes: 5

Production
- Executive producer: Jimmy Mulville
- Running time: 25 minutes
- Production company: Hat Trick Productions

Original release
- Network: Channel 4
- Release: 21 April – 6 May 2015

Ballot Monkeys is a British comedy television series that appeared on Channel 4 in the run up to the 2015 general election. The five-part series was focused on various campaign buses belonging to the Conservative Party, Labour Party, Liberal Democrats, and UK Independence Party (UKIP) and groups of mid-level party campaign organisers as they embark on their respective election campaigns.

The series was written by Andy Hamilton and Guy Jenkin. Episodes were written and produced within hours of transmission, allowing the characters to react to recent real-world events.

== Overview ==
The series cuts between the Conservative, Labour, Liberal Democrat and UKIP buses. Apart from a brief phone call at the end of the last episode, the groups do not interact with each other. All scenes are shot inside or in the immediate vicinity of the campaign buses, and much of the humour comes from the candidates speaking candidly in private about their party and campaign in ways they would not in public.

=== Conservatives ===
In the Conservative group nominal leader Martin (Hugh Dennis), a frustrated one-nation conservative, clashes with the well-connected Baz (Jimmy Akingbola), who openly supports what he considers to be Boris Johnson's inevitable rise to power and is far more willing to engage in more cynical campaign ploys. Women's issues consultant Siobhan (Hattie Morahan) feels marginalised by both men. The group is completed by dim-witted and politically uninformed intern Ruby (Liz Kingsman), who the group is forced to employ as she is the daughter of a major party donor.

=== Labour ===
In the Labour group, Jack (Trevor Cooper), a long time party supporter, is confused and dismayed by how the party, politics, and campaigning has changed. Social media organiser Conor (Theo Barklem-Biggs) continually suggests unhelpful online strategies, mostly to the chagrin of co-ordinator Christine (Daisy Haggard). The advice of American political strategy consultant Melanie (Kathleen Rose Perkins), who frequently attempts to secure a future job in the 2016 presidential election campaign, grates with her English colleagues.

=== Liberal Democrats ===
Liberal Democrat Kevin (Ben Miller), dismayed at the poor electoral prospects of his party, the last five years of coalition government, and a recent divorce, suffers a nervous breakdown, showing increasingly erratic behaviour as the series progresses. Assistant Charlotte (Esther Smith), tries to help, but party grandee Simon (Michael Fenton Stevens) repeatedly refuses to acknowledge that a problem exists.

=== UK Independence Party ===
In the UKIP bus, communications manager Gerry (Andy Nyman), a UKIP supporter on purely Eurosceptic grounds, struggles to prevent political damage arising from the offensive comments and behaviour of other UKIP members, including those of openly bigoted logistics manager Kate (Sarah Hadland). The bus is driven by Obi (Rhashan Stone), a friendly and resourceful Somali immigrant. Gerry and Obi strike up a friendship, bonding over a mutual love of Star Wars, while Kate views him with suspicion due to his race. Gerry is forced to fire Obi after he learns he is an illegal immigrant, and his replacement Mick (Steven O'Donnell) is far more aligned with Kate's bigoted worldview.

== Power Monkeys ==
A sequel series, Power Monkeys began airing on 8 June 2016. While retaining the same up-to-the-minute production style, the new series focuses more broadly on current events, such as the EU referendum or the American election.

== See also ==
- Coalition
- UKIP: The First 100 Days
