= Gazelles (film) =

Les gazelles
- Film poster
- French: Les Gazelles
- Directed by: Mona Achache
- Written by: Mona Achache; Camille Chamoux; Cécile Sellam; Elodie Monlibert; Julien Weill
- Produced by: Eric Juhérian; Mathias Rubin; Frédérique Dumas; Valérie Boyer; Julien Deris; Franck Elbase; David Gauquie; Bertrand Hassini-Bonnette; Nicolas Lesage; Etienne Mallet; Pascal Sennequier; Eric Zaouali
- Starring: Camille Chamoux; Audrey Fleurot; Joséphine de Meaux; Naidra Ayadi; Anne Brochet
- Cinematography: Patrick Blossier
- Edited by: Beatrice Herminie
- Production companies: Récifilms; Orange Studio; France 2 Cinéma
- Distributed by: Paramount Pictures
- Release date: 26 March 2014
- Running time: 99 minutes
- Country: France
- Language: French
- Budget: $4.4 million
- Box office: $2.4 million

Gazelles (French: Les gazelles) is a 2014 French comedy film directed by Mona Achache.

== Plot ==
Marie and Eric, a couple in their thirties who have been together since college, buy their first apartment when Marie is suddenly overcome by doubt. Her encounter with a handsome, dark-haired man forces her to make a decision: she leaves Eric to throw herself into the big sea of pleasure and freedom. But she actually ends up on the bottom of the pool, where she discovers a world without pity: at her age, being single is quickly perceived as a suspicious defect. Enlightened by new friendships, Marie learns to envisage her single life as a chance to become even stronger and to at last be ready to be happy.

== Cast ==
- Camille Chamoux as Marie
- Audrey Fleurot as Sandra
- Joséphine de Meaux as Judith
- Naidra Ayadi as Myriam
- Anne Brochet as Gwen
- Olivia Côte as Véro
- Franck Gastambide as Eric
- Samuel Benchetrit as Martin
- Camille Cottin as Emilie
- Josiane Balasko as Brigitte
- Sam Karmann as Jacques
- Rachel Arditi as Virginie
- Grégoire Ludig as Marco
- David Marsais as Olivier
- Stéphane De Groodt as M. Hublot
- Lolita Chammah as Marie 2
- Maciej Patronik as Janusz
- Miljan Chatelain as Solal
- Marie Dompnier as Charlotte Poussin
- Bastien Ehouzan as Alex
- Jean-Baptiste Puech as Oscar
- Mathieu Madénian as the man who wants a job
