= UFOs (TV series) =

2021 French television series

- French: OVNI(s)
- Genre: Comedy-drama; Science fiction
- Created by: Clémence Dargent; Martin Douaire
- Starring: Melvil Poupaud; Michel Vuillermoz; Géraldine Pailhas; Quentin Dolmaire; Daphné Patakia; Nicole Garcia; Alice Taglioni
- Country of origin: France
- Original language: French
- No. of series: 2
- No. of episodes: 24

Production
- Running time: 30 minutes

Original release
- Network: Canal+
- Release: 11 January 2021 – 14 March 2022

UFOs (French: OVNI(s)) is a French science fiction comedy-drama television series created by Clémence Dargent and Martin Douaire. The first season premiered on Canal+ on 11 January 2021. The series was renewed for a second season before the series premiere, and received favorable reviews from critics. The second season premiered on 21 February 2022. On 30 June 2022, Canal+ cancelled the series after two seasons. In the series, Melvil Poupaud stars as a scientist tasked with leading a team of UFO researchers in France. It has been described by Marianne as a cross between La Soupe aux choux, The Office and The X-Files.

== Plot ==
=== Season 1 ===
In 1978, CNES engineer Didier Mathure watches his rocket explode after takeoff. His career at rock bottom, Mathure is sidelined as the head of GEPAN, the agency's mysterious research department dedicated to the scientific study of unexplained aerial phenomena. Supported by the department's eccentric staff, he must lead the search for evidence of paranormal and extraterrestrial life in France.

=== Season 2 ===
In 1979, Didier Mathure now strongly believes in UFOs, after seeing one at the end of season 1 under the influence of LSD. Alongside Véra, he travels through France in search of supernatural phenomena and seems more disconnected than ever from his children and his ex-wife, Élise, who has become director of CNES. When a mysterious event occurs in a nuclear power plant, Didier quickly reconnects with his former colleagues from GEPAN. Together, they try to establish contact with intelligent life from elsewhere, watched closely by newcomer, Claire Carmignac, who handles communication for the Ministry of Development and Energy.

== Cast ==
=== Main ===
- Melvil Poupaud as Didier Mathure
- Michel Vuillermoz as Marcel Bénes
- Géraldine Pailhas as Élise Conti
- Quentin Dolmaire as Rémy Bidaut
- Daphné Patakia as Véra Clouseau
- Nicole Garcia as Valérie Delbrosse
- Alice Taglioni as Claire Carmignac

=== Recurring ===
- Jean-Luc Bideau as Lucien Mathure
- Andréa Ferréol as Suzanne Mathure

== Episodes ==
Series	Episodes	Originally released	
Series	Episodes	First released	Last released
1	12	11 January 2021	1 February 2021
2	12	21 February 2022	14 March 2022

=== Season 1 (2021) ===
No. overall	No. in season	Title	Directed by	Written by	Original release date
1	1	"Episode 1"	Antony Cordier	Screenplay : Clémence Dargent & Martin Douaire	11 January 2021
2	2	"Episode 2"	Antony Cordier	Screenplay : Clémence Dargent & Martin Douaire	11 January 2021
3	3	"Episode 3"	Antony Cordier	Screenplay : Clémence Dargent & Martin Douaire	11 January 2021
4	4	"Episode 4"	Antony Cordier	Screenplay : Clémence Dargent & Martin Douaire & Julien Anscutter; Participation : Marie Eynard	18 January 2021
5	5	"Episode 5"	Antony Cordier	Screenplay : Clémence Dargent & Martin Douaire & Marie Eynard; Participation : Julien Anscutter	18 January 2021
6	6	"Episode 6"	Antony Cordier	Screenplay : Clémence Dargent & Martin Douaire; Participation : Marie Eynard & Julien Anscutter	18 January 2021
7	7	"Episode 7"	Antony Cordier	Screenplay : Clémence Dargent & Martin Douaire; Collaboration : Julien Anscutter & Marie Eynard & Clemence Madeleine Perdrillet & Raphaëlle Richet	25 January 2021
8	8	"Episode 8"	Antony Cordier	Screenplay : Clémence Dargent & Martin Douaire; Collaboration : Julien Anscutter & Marie Eynard & Clemence Madeleine Perdrillet & Raphaëlle Richet	25 January 2021
9	9	"Episode 9"	Antony Cordier	Screenplay : Clémence Dargent & Martin Douaire; Collaboration : Julien Anscutter & Marie Eynard & Clemence Madeleine Perdrillet & Raphaëlle Richet	25 January 2021
10	10	"Episode 10"	Antony Cordier	Screenplay : Clémence Dargent & Martin Douaire; Collaboration : Julien Anscutter & Marie Eynard & Clemence Madeleine Perdrillet & Raphaëlle Richet	1 February 2021
11	11	"Episode 11"	Antony Cordier	Screenplay : Clémence Dargent & Martin Douaire; Collaboration : Julien Anscutter & Marie Eynard & Clemence Madeleine Perdrillet & Raphaëlle Richet	1 February 2021
12	12	"Episode 12"	Antony Cordier	Screenplay : Clémence Dargent & Martin Douaire; Collaboration : Julien Anscutter & Marie Eynard & Clemence Madeleine Perdrillet & Raphaëlle Richet	1 February 2021

=== Season 2 (2022) ===
No. overall	No. in season	Title	Directed by	Written by	Original release date
13	1	"Episode 1"	Antony Cordier	Screenplay : Clémence Dargent & Martin Douaire & Maxime Berthemy	21 February 2022
14	2	"Episode 2"	Antony Cordier	Screenplay : Clémence Dargent & Martin Douaire & Maxime Berthemy	21 February 2022
15	3	"Episode 3"	Antony Cordier	Screenplay : Clémence Dargent & Martin Douaire & Maxime Berthemy	21 February 2022
16	4	"Episode 4"	Antony Cordier	Screenplay : Clémence Dargent & Martin Douaire & Maxime Berthemy	28 February 2022
17	5	"Episode 5"	Antony Cordier	Screenplay : Clémence Dargent & Martin Douaire & Maxime Berthemy	28 February 2022
18	6	"Episode 6"	Antony Cordier	Screenplay : Clémence Dargent & Martin Douaire & Maxime Berthemy	28 February 2022
19	7	"Episode 7"	Antony Cordier	Screenplay : Clémence Dargent & Martin Douaire & Maxime Berthemy; Collaboration : Raphaëlle Richet	7 March 2022
20	8	"Episode 8"	Antony Cordier	Screenplay : Clémence Dargent & Martin Douaire & Maxime Berthemy; Collaboration : Raphaëlle Richet	7 March 2022
21	9	"Episode 9"	Antony Cordier	Screenplay : Clémence Dargent & Martin Douaire & Maxime Berthemy; Collaboration : Raphaëlle Richet	7 March 2022
22	10	"Episode 10"	Antony Cordier	Screenplay : Clémence Dargent & Martin Douaire & Maxime Berthemy; Collaboration : Raphaëlle Richet	14 March 2022
23	11	"Episode 11"	Antony Cordier	Screenplay : Clémence Dargent & Martin Douaire & Maxime Berthemy; Collaboration : Raphaëlle Richet	14 March 2022
24	12	"Episode 12"	Antony Cordier	Screenplay : Clémence Dargent & Martin Douaire & Maxime Berthemy; Collaboration : Raphaëlle Richet	14 March 2022

== Awards ==
- ACS Awards
  - Best TV Series: 26 minutes (2021)
  - Best Actor for Melvil Poupaud (2021)
  - Best Director for Antony Cordier (2022)
