= Power Monkeys =

- Created by: Andy Hamilton; Guy Jenkin
- Written by: Andy Hamilton; Guy Jenkin
- Starring: Jack Dee; Kevin McNally; Archie Panjabi
- Composer: Philip Pope
- Country of origin: United Kingdom
- Original language: English
- No. of series: 1
- No. of episodes: 6

Production
- Executive producer: Jimmy Mulville
- Running time: 25 minutes
- Production company: Hat Trick Productions

Original release
- Network: Channel 4
- Release: 8 June – 6 July 2016

Power Monkeys is a 2016 British political comedy series which appeared on Channel 4 in the run-up to and immediate aftermath of the 2016 UK EU membership referendum, and also lampooned the ongoing 2016 United States Presidential election campaign.

The six-part series depicts four different sets of fictional mid-level political operatives, reacting to and commentating on political and other events. Like its predecessor series Ballot Monkeys, episodes were written and produced within hours of transmission, allowing the characters to react to recent real-world events.

The series was written by Andy Hamilton and Guy Jenkin. It stars Jack Dee, Kevin McNally and Archie Panjabi.

== Synopsis ==
Though broader in scope, Power Monkeys is similar in format to its predecessor, featuring four mostly non-interacting groups of mid-level political operatives. The characters of Gerry of Ukip and Ruby of the Conservatives from Ballot Monkeys feature. The settings are:

- A Vote Leave campaign bus
- A Conservative Party "unity unit" tasked with trying to keep peace between Conservatives on different sides of the EU referendum debate.
- The Donald Trump presidential campaign plane.
- A Kremlin office housing aides to Vladimir Putin.

== Cast ==
The main cast consists of:

- Jack Dee as Oliver of the Conservatives, a drunk gambler and Remainer, with the "people skills of the South Yorkshire Police".
- Kevin McNally as Spencer, a rich self-made millionaire who steals road signs as a hobby and in protest against the European Union and the nanny state. He's getting married soon after the referendum but his fiancée is cheating on him.
- Archie Panjabi as Preeya of the Conservatives on the vote leave bus campaigning for leave before the referendum and then at the Unity Unit afterwards.
- Claire Skinner as Sara of the Conservatives, she has a one-night stand with Tony which she can't get over. She is OCD about milk being left out of the fridge.
- Andy Nyman as Gerry of Ukip, head of the leave battle bus while struggling with his father's death. He also appeared in Ballot Monkeys.
- Ayda Field as Bea of the US Republican Party, deputy of the Trump campaign – an over-enthusiastic, somewhat delusional, Trump campaigner.
- Amelia Bullmore as Lauren of the US Republican Party who's tasked with making Trump more appealing to women.
- Robert Wilfort as Brett of the Republican party, a dim Republican who idolises Trump's every word and who served as his golf caddy.
- Ben Willbond as Oleg, a long-standing aide of Vladimir Putin who jostles with Alexi for Putin's favour.
- Alec Utgoff as Alexi, a newly appointed aide to Vladimir Putin tasked with such honours as walking the president's dog.
- Anthony Calf as Tony of the Conservatives and leader of the Unity Unit, he is married, but has a one-night stand with Sara much to Sara's regret.
- Liz Kingsman as Ruby of the Conservatives a dim unity unit staff member who is only there because her father's a donor. She also appeared in Ballot Monkeys.
- Gwyneth Keyworth as Jackie of the Labour party, a far-left neo-communist who supports Brexit as a means of achieving the abolition of capitalism and the establishment of a direct e-democracy.
