= Ainsi soient-ils =

- Original language: French
- No. of seasons: 3
- No. of episodes: 24

Production
- Camera setup: Multi-camera

Original release
- Network: ARTE
- Release: October 11, 2012

Ainsi soient-ils, also known as The Churchmen and Thy Will Be Done in English-speaking countries, is a French television series. In The U.S., the series was shown on MHz Networks beginning in 2012.

== Content ==
The series takes place in the fictional seminary of the Capuchins in Paris. In the foreground are five seminarians who come from different backgrounds: Yann comes from Brittany and is a scout. Raphael comes from a rich Catholic family. Emmanuel - adoptive son of African descent - is an archaeologist and has turned down the opportunity to graduate to attend the seminar. He was under treatment for depression. Guillaume studied political science and lived in a homosexual partnership. José has killed a Russian drug dealer in a dispute, he has served his prison sentence. Together, the goal is to become priests.

The series accompanies them through the studies and the process of detachment from their previous lives. In the process, inner and outer conflicts of the protagonists are described. The hand of Fr Fromenger accompanies the five young men; for more than 20 years he is director of the seminary. He is assisted by Fr Bosco. In the second season, the seminary is facing its closure.

== Remake ==
As of 2017, Tom Fontana was said to be involved in an American remake of the series, set in New York City and set to be aired on Netflix.

== Cast ==
- Jean-Luc Bideau: Étienne Fromenger
- Thierry Gimenez: Dominique Bosco
- Michel Duchaussoy: Joseph Roman
- Julien Bouanich: Yann Le Megueur
- David Baiot: Emmanuel Charrier
- Clément Manuel: Guillaume Morvan
- Clément Roussier: Raphaël Chanseaulme
- Samuel Jouy: José Del Sarte
- Noémie Lvovsky: Jeanne Valadon (season 3)
- Patrick d'Assumçao: Father Chalumeau (season 3)
- Sabine Pakora: Fatou
