= Clémence Dargent =

French screenwriter and actress

- Born: Lyon, France
- Education: Master in Screenwriting (Nanterre University, 2013) Diploma in Television Series (Fémis, 2015)
- Occupations: Screenwriter, film director, actress
- Known for: Bernadette (screenwriter), UFOs (screenwriter), Tokyo Crush (screenwriter)
- Awards: Finalist for the 2014 Youth Award for Best Screenplay (Grand prix du meilleur scénariste) for Bis Repetita

Clémence Dargent is a French screenwriter, film director, and actress.

Born in Lyon, Dargent graduated in 2013 from Nanterre University with a Master in Screenwriting and obtained a diploma in Television Series at Fémis in 2015.

She wrote the screenplay to Bernadette, directed by Léa Domenach and starring Catherine Deneuve.

In 2023, her second effort as a screenwriter of feature films was released. Bis Repetita, directed by Émilie Noblet. The screenplay, written by Dargent back in 2014, made her a finalist for the 2014 Youth Award for Best Screenplay at the Grand prix du meilleur scénariste.

She wrote the screenplay for UFOs. The series became a major hit on Canal Plus, it was also selected for Berlinale Series Market Selects 2021.

In March 2025, her TV Series Tokyo Crush won the Co-Pro Pitching Sessions at Series Mania.

== Selected filmography ==
- 2021–2022 – UFOs (screenplay);
- 2023 – Bernadette (screenplay).
- 2026 - Comédie-Française
