= Marina Hands =

French actress (born 1975)

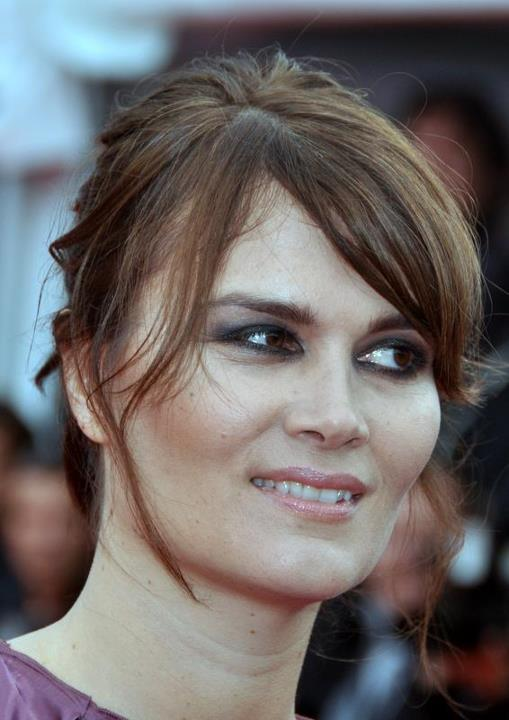
- Marina Hands at the 2012 Deauville American Film Festival
- Born: 10 January 1975 (age 51); Paris, France
- Education: London Academy of Music and Dramatic Art
- Occupation: Actress
- Years active: 1996–present
- Parent(s): Terry Hands; Ludmila Mikaël
- Marina Hands' voice from the BBC programme, The Film Programme, 17 August 2007

Marina Hands (born 10 January 1975) is a French stage and film actress. Hands is the daughter of British director Terry Hands and French actress Ludmila Mikaël, and the granddaughter of Ukrainian-Greek painter Pierre Dmitrienko. She studied acting at the Cours Florent and the CNSAD in France, and the London Academy of Music and Dramatic Art in England.

== Life and career ==
In 1999, she made her stage debut in Le Bel Air de Londres by Dion Boucicault, and was nominated for a Molière Award. Her first film was Andrzej Żuławski's La Fidélité (2000), followed by The Barbarian Invasions (2003). She then appeared in Les Âmes grises (2005), for which she was nominated for the César Award for Most Promising Actress, and Ne le dis à personne (Tell No One) (2006).

Her most notable performance to date was in the title role of Lady Chatterley (2006), an adaptation of John Thomas and Lady Jane by D. H. Lawrence. Hands won the 2007 César Award for Best Actress for her performance.

In 2006, Hands became a company member of the Comédie-Française. In 2008, she was again nominated for a Molière Award for her play in Partage de midi.

In 2011, she starred in Claude Miller's film Voyez comme ils dansent.

In 2019, she played Elvira in the TV series Mythomaniac.

== Theatre ==
Year	Title	Author	Director	Notes
1996	Gertrud	Hjalmar Söderberg	Gérard Desarthe	
1997	Tales from the Vienna Woods	Ödön von Horváth	John Bashford	
1997	The Merchant of Venice	William Shakespeare	Penny Cherns	
1998	London Assurance	Dion Boucicault	Adrian Brine	Nominated – Molière Award for Best Female Newcomer
1998	The Giants of the Mountain	Luigi Pirandello	Klaus Michael Grüber	
1999	Fräulein Else	Arthur Schnitzler	Didier Long	
2001	Cyrano de Bergerac	Edmond Rostand	Jacques Weber	
2003	Phèdre	Jean Racine	Patrice Chéreau	Nominated – Molière Award for Best Supporting Actress; Nominated – Molière Award for Best Female Newcomer
2004	Richard II	William Shakespeare	Thierry de Peretti	
2006	Tête d'or	Paul Claudel	Anne Delbée	
2007	Partage de midi	Paul Claudel	Yves Beaunesne	Nominated – Molière Award for Best Actress
2007	The Misanthrope	Molière	Lukas Hemleb	
2009	Mary Stuart	Friedrich Schiller	Terry Hands	
2009	Partage de midi	Paul Claudel	Yves Beaunesne (2)	
2013	Lucrezia Borgia	Victor Hugo	Lucie Berelowitsch	
2013	Iphigenia in Tauris	Johann Wolfgang von Goethe	Clément Hervieu-Léger	
2015	Ivanov	Anton Chekhov	Luc Bondy	

== Filmography ==
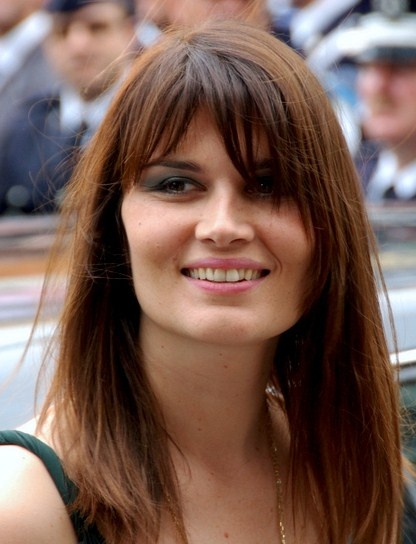
Marina Hands at the 2008 Cannes Film Festival.

Year	Title	Role	Director	Notes
1996	Sans regrets	The woman	Guillaume Canet	Short
2000	Fidelity	Julia	Andrzej Żuławski	
2001	Un pique-nique chez Osiris	Héloïse Ancelin	Nina Companeez	TV movie
2002	Sur le bout des doigts	Juliette	Yves Angelo	
2003	The Barbarian Invasions	Gaëlle	Denys Arcand	
2003	À la fenêtre	The girl	Marianne Østengen	Short
2003	Phèdre	Aricie	Stéphane Metge	TV movie
2004	Mon homme	Marie	Stéphanie Tchou-Cotta	Short
2005	Grey Souls	Lysia Verhareine	Yves Angelo (2)	Nominated – César Award for Most Promising Actress
2006	Lady Chatterley	Constance Chatterley	Pascale Ferran	César Award for Best Actress; Lumière Award for Best Actress; Tribeca Film Festival Award for Best Actress; Nominated – César Award for Most Promising Actress; Nominated – Globes de Cristal Award for Best Actress; Nominated – International Cinephile Society Award for Best Actress; Nominated – Village Voice Film Poll – Best Actress; Nominated – Étoiles d'Or for Best Female Newcomer
2006	Tell No One	Anne Beck	Guillaume Canet (2)	
2007	The Diving Bell and the Butterfly	Joséphine	Julian Schnabel	Nominated – International Cinephile Society Award for Best Ensemble
2007	Le temps d'un regard	Natalya	Ilan Flammer	
2008	Story of Jen	Sarah	François Rotger	
2009	Hidden Diary	Audrey	Julie Lopes-Curval	
2009	Change of Plans	Juliette	Danièle Thompson	
2010	An Ordinary Execution	Anna	Marc Dugain	
2010	Ensemble, nous allons vivre une très, très grande histoire d'amour...	Dorothée Duchamp	Pascal Thomas	
2011	See How They Dance	Lise Clément	Claude Miller	
2011	Sport de filles	Gracieuse	Patricia Mazuy	
2011	Pour Djamila	Gisèle Halimi	Caroline Huppert	TV movie Nominated – Monte-Carlo Television Festival – Best Performance by an Actress
2011	Partage de midi	Ysé	Claude Mouriéras	TV movie
2013	Jappeloup	Nadia	Christian Duguay	
2014	French Women	Inès	Audrey Dana	
2014	GHB: To Be or Not to Be	Gil / Henrietta / Fleur	Laetitia Masson	
2014	Les jours venus	Marie	Romain Goupil	
2015	Chic!	Hélène Birk	Jérôme Cornuau	
2017	Taboo	Countess Musgrove	Anders Engström	TV series
2018	Guy	Kris-Eva	Alex Lutz	
2019	Mythomaniac	Elvira	Fabrice Gobert	Nominated - ACS Award for Best Actress
2026	Comédie-Française	Émilie Hamel	Martin Darondeau, Bertrand Usclat	
