= Le Week-End =

2013 film

- British release poster
- Directed by: Roger Michell
- Written by: Hanif Kureishi
- Produced by: Kevin Loader
- Starring: Jim Broadbent; Lindsay Duncan; Jeff Goldblum; Olly Alexander; Judith Davis
- Cinematography: Nathalie Durand
- Edited by: Kristina Hetherington
- Music by: Jeremy Sams
- Production companies: Film4; Free Range Films; Le Bureau
- Distributed by: Curzon Film World (United Kingdom); ARP Sélection (France)
- Release dates: 7 September 2013 (TIFF); 11 October 2013 (United Kingdom); 5 March 2014 (France)
- Running time: 93 minutes
- Countries: United Kingdom; France
- Languages: English; French
- Box office: $2.2 million

Le Week-End is a 2013 British-French comedy-drama film directed by Roger Michell and starring Jim Broadbent, Lindsay Duncan, and Jeff Goldblum. Written by Hanif Kureishi, the film is the fourth collaboration between Michell and Kureishi, who both began developing the story seven years prior during a weekend trip to Montmartre. It was screened in the Special Presentation section at the 2013 Toronto International Film Festival.

== Plot ==
Nick and Meg Burrows are a married academic couple from Moseley, Birmingham on holiday in Paris to celebrate their 30th wedding anniversary. Meg finds the lodging selected by Nick to be unsuitable and they book a room at much more expensive hotel. Their relationship vacillates, with conflict more often in evidence than affection. Among other things, Meg is frustrated by a phone call from their idle son which reveals Nick's repeated willingness to take him back into their home.

Over the weekend, Nick and Meg spend time in the hotel and visiting bars and restaurants. During a lunch, Nick reveals that he has been instructed to take early retirement and Meg reveals that she has been considering leaving Nick to be free to take up new interests. They bump into Morgan, with whom Nick went to university and who is now a wealthy writer. Morgan's success stands in sharp contrast to Nick and Meg's plodding careers and lives.

Leaving the hotel on one of their excursions, Nick pauses and comments on a favourite movie (the dance scene from Bande à part) that is playing on the TV. All efforts at thrift put aside, Nick and Meg visit an expensive restaurant. On seeing the bill, Meg asks Nick to wait outside. Meg descends to the basement and finds a way out without paying the bill. Emerging at street level, Meg calls Nick over to break open a grille to let her out.

Nick and Meg attend a dinner party at Morgan's place. Before dinner is served, Meg agrees to meet another man later and tells Nick about the planned meeting. When dinner is served, Morgan makes a toast to Nick, giving tribute to Nick's formative influence on him when they were younger, and Nick's successes in his personal life. Nick rises and tells the entire dinner party that he has not had academic success, his wife has a date with another man, and he is financially distressed. Meg then rises and tells of a recent call overheard by a friend who, given Meg's bright demeanour, asked Meg whether she was talking to her secret lover. The call, she said, was with her husband.

Nick and Meg leave the party arm-in-arm. The next day, Nick handles a second call from their son telling him he cannot return to the home that is now just him and Meg.

When they return to their hotel, they learn that they have exceeded their credit card limit. They bolt and ask Morgan to come to their aid. He arrives at the café bringing sympathy and the possibility of help. The movie ends as Nick puts a familiar tune on the jukebox. Nick dances in the midst of the café where Meg joins him, followed by the always curious Morgan, recreating the scene from Bande à part.

== Cast ==
- Jim Broadbent as Nick Burrows
- Lindsay Duncan as Meg Burrows
- Jeff Goldblum as Morgan
- Olly Alexander as Michael, Morgan's son by his first marriage
- Judith Davis as Eve, Morgan's second wife
- Marie-France Alvarez as Victoire La Chapelle

== Reception ==
Le Week-End received positive reviews upon its release. Film review aggregator Rotten Tomatoes reports that 89% of critics gave the film a positive review based on 148 reviews, with an average score of 7.4/10. The website's critical consensus states: "Topped with bittersweet humor but possessing surprisingly thorny depths, Le Week-End offers a sophisticated, well-acted portrait of late-life struggles and long-term marriage." On Metacritic, which assigns a rating out of 100 based on reviews from critics, the film has a score of 73 based on 29 reviews, indicating "generally favorable reviews".

David Rooney of The Hollywood Reporter gave the film a positive review, stating, "This fourth collaboration between director Roger Michell and screenwriter Hanif Kureishi is pleasurably supple in its mood shifts between droll verbal comedy and penetrating emotional truth. While not without touches of precious affectation, the film is imbued with an engaging mix of warmth and prickliness by the lovely, lived-in performances of Jim Broadbent and Lindsay Duncan." Dennis Harvey of Variety also praised the direction, writing, and lead performances calling the film a "bittersweet, charming [...] display of keenly intelligent craftsmanship on all levels [that] should appeal to the same mature audiences that embraced the creators’ 2006 Venus."
