= Baron Noir =

French TV drama

- Genre: Political drama
- Written by: Eric Benzekri; Jean-Baptiste Delafon
- Directed by: Ziad Doueiri; Antoine Chevrollier
- Starring: Kad Merad; Niels Arestrup; Anna Mouglalis; Hugo Becker; Astrid Whettnall
- Composers: Evgueni & Sacha Galperine
- Country of origin: France
- Original language: French
- No. of series: 3
- No. of episodes: 24

Production
- Producer: Thomas Bourguignon
- Cinematography: Tommaso Fiorilli
- Editors: Sarah Anderson; Camille Toubkis
- Running time: 52-55 minutes
- Production company: Kwaï

Original release
- Network: Canal+
- Release: 8 February 2016 – 2 March 2020

Baron Noir (screened as Republican Gangsters in some markets) is a French political drama television series which premiered on Canal+ on 8 February 2016. The series was developed by Eric Benzekri and Jean-Baptiste Delafon.

== Premise ==
Baron Noir is the political and judicial saga of Philippe Rickwaert, member of Parliament and mayor of Dunkerque, who is driven by an irrepressible thirst for personal revenge. Between rounds of the presidential election, he sees his future collapse when his mentor, the leftist candidate, sacrifices him to save his campaign. Determined to reinvent his career, Rickwaert uses cunning and connections to win political fights against those who betrayed him, creating a new alliance with the closest adviser of his enemy. Formidable but uncontrollable, conflicted between truth and lies, cultivating friendships in all strata of society (including within the police and organized crime), Philippe Rickwaert's life dissolves into a fascinating organised chaos. Rickwaert takes the fight to his opponents - and to his own demons - at every opportunity.

== Cast ==
=== Main ===
- Kad Merad as Philippe Rickwaert
- Niels Arestrup as Francis Laugier (Season 1)
- Anna Mouglalis as Amélie Dorendeu
- Hugo Becker as Cyril Balsan
- Astrid Whettnall as Véronique Bosso
- François Morel as Michel Vidal

=== Recurring ===
- Laurent Spielvogel as Armand Chambolle
- Jade Phan-Gia as Françoise Levasseur
- Lubna Gourion as Salomé Rickwaert
- Scali Delpeyrat as Martin Borde
- Philippe Résimont as Daniel Kalhenberg
- Eric Caruso as Laurent Mirmont
- Erika Sainte as Fanny Alvergne
- Maryne Bertieaux as Alison

=== Guest ===
Season 1

- Michel Voïta as Jean-Marc Auzanet
- Jean-Pierre Martins as Bruno Rickwaert
- Michel Muller as Gérard Balleroy
- Mahdi Belemlih as Medhi Fateni
- Patrick Rocca as Alain Chistera
- Alban Aumard as Sylvain Buisine
- Yannick Morzelle as Bruce Rickwaert
- Rémy Stiel as Jordan Rickwaert
- Marie Lanchas as Elodie Jacquemot
- Alain Pointier as Jean-Pierre Barthélémy
- Stéphane Ropa as Boris Valentin
- Phénix Brossard as Sébastien
- Damien Jouillerot as Toph
- Alain Pronnier as Eddy
- Jean-Erns Marie-Louise as Ménadier
- Brigitte Froment as Maryse
- Léon Plazol as Théo
- Sébastien Beuret as Arthur

Season 3

- Marie-France Alvarez as Malika

== Episodes ==
Season	Episodes	Originally released	
Season	Episodes	First released	Last released
1	8	February 8, 2016	February 29, 2016
2	8	February 22, 2018	February 12, 2018
3	8	February 10, 2020	March 2, 2020

=== Season 1 (2016) ===
No. overall	No. in season	Title	Directed by	Written by	Original release date	France viewers (millions)
1	1	"Jupiter"	Unknown	Unknown	February 8, 2016	N/A
2	2	"1932"	Unknown	Unknown	February 8, 2016	N/A
3	3	"Solférino"	Unknown	Unknown	February 15, 2016	N/A
4	4	"Bleu"	Unknown	Unknown	February 15, 2016	N/A
5	5	"Grenelle"	Unknown	Unknown	February 22, 2016	N/A
6	6	"Shutdown"	Unknown	Unknown	February 22, 2016	N/A
7	7	"Pianoforte"	Unknown	Unknown	February 29, 2016	N/A
8	8	"Pardon"	Unknown	Unknown	February 29, 2016	N/A

=== Season 2 (2018) ===
No. overall	No. in season	Title	Directed by	Written by	Original release date	France viewers (millions)
9	1	"Twins"	Unknown	Unknown	January 22, 2018	N/A
10	2	"Tourniquet"	Unknown	Unknown	January 22, 2018	N/A
11	3	"Haram"	Unknown	Unknown	January 29, 2018	N/A
12	4	"Conversion"	Unknown	Unknown	January 29, 2018	N/A
13	5	"Chouquette"	Unknown	Unknown	February 5, 2018	N/A
14	6	"Remontada"	Unknown	Unknown	February 5, 2018	N/A
15	7	"Diprotodon"	Unknown	Unknown	February 12, 2018	N/A
16	8	"Sorpasso"	Unknown	Unknown	February 12, 2018	N/A

=== Season 3 (2020) ===
No. overall	No. in season	Title	Directed by	Written by	Original release date	France viewers (millions)
17	1	"Check up"	Unknown	Unknown	February 10, 2020	N/A
18	2	"Diaspora"	Unknown	Unknown	February 10, 2020	N/A
19	3	"#MeToo"	Unknown	Unknown	February 17, 2020	N/A
20	4	"Inventaire"	Unknown	Unknown	February 17, 2020	N/A
21	5	"Satanas"	Unknown	Unknown	February 24, 2020	N/A
22	6	"Oui"	Unknown	Unknown	February 24, 2020	N/A
23	7	"Brüder"	Unknown	Unknown	March 2, 2020	N/A
24	8	"Ahou!"	Unknown	Unknown	March 2, 2020	N/A

== Development and production ==
On 29 February 2016, Eric Benzekri, the writer of the series announced that the season 2 will be shot during the next presidential and it was aired in 2018. Season 3 debuted in February 2020.

== Reception ==
The TV Series was very well received by French critics. Le Monde, L'Obs, Les Inrockuptibles, Metro International, Paris Match and Télérama gave the first season 4 out of 5 stars. L'Express and Libération gave 3.5 out of 5 stars.

== Accolades ==
Year	Awards	Category	Recipient	Result
2016	ACS Award	Best TV Series	Canal+	Nominated
2016	ACS Award	Best Writer	Eric Benzekri & Jean-Baptiste Delafon	Nominated
2016	ACS Award	Best Director	Ziad Doueiri	Nominated
2016	ACS Award	Best Actor	Niels Arestrup	Nominated
2016	ACS Award	Best Actor	Kad Merad	Won
2016	ACS Award	Best Actress	Anna Mouglalis	Nominated
2016	ACS Award	Best Production	Kwaï	Nominated
2017	Globes de Cristal Award	Best TV Series	Eric Benzekri & Jean-Baptiste Delafon	Nominated
2017	Trophées du Film Français	Best Writer-Producer	Thomas Bourguignon, Eric Benzekri & Jean-Baptiste Delafon	Won
2017	45th International Emmy Awards	Best Actor	Kad Merad	Nominated
