= Sambre - Anatomy of a Crime =

French true-crime television series

- Genre: True crime
- Based on: Sambre, radioscopie d'un fait divers by Alice Géraud
- Screenplay by: Alice Géraud; Marc Herpoux
- Directed by: Jean-Xavier de Lestrade
- Starring: Clémence Poésy; Alix Poisson; Julian Frison; Olivier Gourmet; Noémie Lvovsky; Jonathan Turnbull; Pauline Parigot
- Country of origin: France
- Original language: French
- No. of series: 1
- No. of episodes: 6

Production
- Producers: Matthieu Belghiti; Lionel Uzan; Pascal Breton
- Production companies: What’s Up Films; Federation Studios; Versus Production

Original release
- Network: France Télévisions (France); BBC Four (UK)

Sambre - Anatomy of a Crime is a 2023 French-Belgian true crime television film miniseries directed by Jean-Xavier de Lestrade and starring Alix Poisson, Jonathan Turnbull and others including Clémence Poésy.

== Premise ==
Sambre is a TV drama based on the French judicial system's failure to prevent serial rapist Dino Scala's 30-year reign of terror from 1988-2018 on dawn roads near the River Sambre on both sides of the French/Belgian border.

== Cast ==
- Alix Poisson as Christine Labot, the first victim.
- Jonathan Turnbull as Enzo Salina, the rapist.
- Julien Frison as Jean-Pierre Blanchot, the policeman.
- Pauline Parigot as Irène Dereux, the judge.
- Noémie Lvovsky as Arlette Caruso, the mayor.
- Clémence Poésy as Cécile Dumont, the scientist.
- Olivier Gourmet as Étienne Winckler, the police commander.
- Louise Orry-Diquéro as Stéphanie Salina, Enzo's wife.

== Episodes ==
1. Christine (la victime)
2. Irène (la juge)
3. Arlette (la maire)
4. Cécile (la scientifique)
5. Winckler (le commandant)
6. Enzo (le violeur)

== Production ==
The six-part series is directed by Jean-Xavier de Lestrade and adapted from the true-crime book Sambre, radioscopie d'un fait divers by French journalist Alice Géraud. Lestrade previously directed the documentary series The Staircase (2004, 2013 and 2018) which was at the frontier of the new televisual true crime wave, and each episode of Sambre is end-credited as “fiction, inspired by real events” and "intended to pay tribute to the victims". The script was written by Alice Géraud and Marc Herpoux.

The series is produced by What’s Up Films and Federation Studios in co-production with Versus Production. It was originally commissioned by France Televisions. Episodes of the series are told chronologically but each with a focus on the involvement of a new central character (a female victim, a judge, a town mayor, a scientist, a police commander) until the last episode focuses on the rapist's capture and confession.

The cast is led by Alix Poisson, Jonathan Turnbull and Julien Frison throughout, and augmented by Noémie Lvovsky, Pauline Parigot, Clémence Poésy and Olivier Gourmet in individual episodes.

== Broadcast ==
The series was broadcast as Sambre in France on France Télévisions and obtained by Movistar in Spain and the BBC in the United Kingdom. Broadcast in the United Kingdom started on 31 August 2024 on BBC Four.

== Reception ==
After its broadcast in France in 2023, newspaper Les Echos described it as "a disturbing yet essential series that shines a spotlight on the very slow response by society and institutions when it comes to sexual crimes". It won Best Foreign TV Film/Miniseries at the Shanghai TV Festival in June 2024. In 2024 when broadcast in the UK, a Guardian newspaper review praised it as "an important artefact of outrage, spotlighting the institutional failings and ingrained cultural misogyny that left the rapist at large for so long".
