= Lucas Englander =

Austrian actor (born 1992)

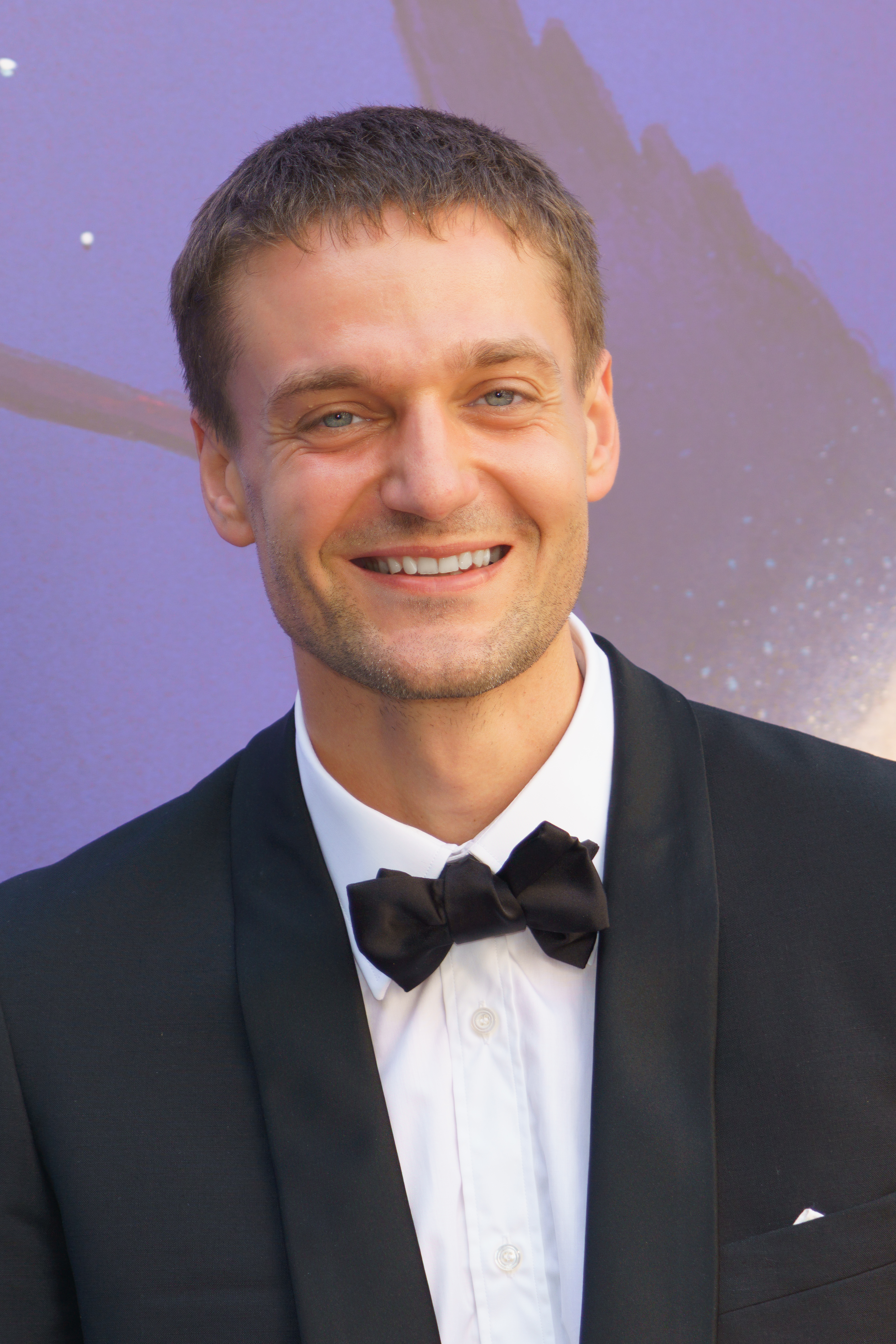
- Englander in 2026
- Born: 21 September 1992 (age 33); Vienna, Austria
- Occupation: Actor

Lucas Englander (born 21 September 1992) is an Austrian actor. He was selected in the category "Révélations", the best newcomer category at the 46th César Awards. At the Berlinale 2026 he was awarded the "European Shooting Star Award" for his performance in 9 Perfect Strangers.

== Early life and education ==
Born in Vienna, his mother Juno Sylva Englander was a Czech-born film editor, working on Everyman's Feast amongst others. Englander planned to join the military, study law as well as environmental sciences and become a diplomat, but instead decided in his late teens to pursue acting. He spent a year studying at the Stella Adler Studio of Acting in New York.

== Career ==
Englander appeared as political assistant Torsten in the highly successful satirical European Union politics series that appeared on france.tv called Parlement. He also appeared in Marc Fitoussi’s 2020 French thriller Appearances next to Karin Viard, a performance that got him shortlisted for France’s 46th César Awards in the "Révélations des César" category in March 2021.

He appeared in Sky Atlantic and HBO miniseries Catherine The Great, Netflix series The Witcher, in the Warner Bros. fantasy film Fantastic Beasts: The Secrets of Dumbledore, as well as in Peacock's and Sky's The Day of the Jackal. His role as Albert O. Hirschman in the 2023 Netflix series Transatlantic marked his first leading role in a major series. In 2025 he was nominated for the Austrian Romy Award in the category of 'favorite actor in a series' for his performance in 9 Perfect Strangers Season 2. At the Berlinale 2026 Englander was awarded the European Shooting Star Award by the European Film Promotion.

== Partial filmography ==
Year	Title	Role	Notes
2019	The Witcher	Chireadan	1 episode
2019	Catherine the Great	Lieutenant Mirovich	1 episode
2020–2023	Parlement	Torsten Muckenstrum	21 episodes
2020	Appearances	Jonas Karez	Film. Nominated for Best Newcomer at the César Awards
2022	House of Lust	Ian	Film
2023	Fantastic Beasts: The Secrets of Dumbledore	Horst	Film
2023	Transatlantic	Albert Hirschman	7 episodes
2025	Nine Perfect Strangers	Martin	season 2 ESS Award Berlinale 2026
TBA	Truth or Consequences†	TBA	Film
2026	Bruno: Der Junge Kreisky	Rudolf Auerhahn	FIlm
2026	The Girl With The Leica	Georg	Film
2026	Quand Le Monde Nous Regardera	TBA	Film
TBA	The Wedding Dress	Ludwig	Film

Key
†	Denotes works that have not yet been released
