= Witnesses (TV series) =

French police procedural television series

- French: Les Témoins
- Genre: Police procedural
- Created by: Marc Herpoux; Hervé Hadmar
- Written by: Marc Herpoux; Hervé Hadmar
- Directed by: Hervé Hadmar
- Starring: Marie Dompnier; Jan Hammenecker; Alexandre Carrière; Florence Bolufer; Thierry Lhermitte; Laurent Lucas; Catherine Mouchet; Audrey Fleurot; Judith Henry
- Composer: Éric Demarsan
- Country of origin: France
- Original language: French
- No. of seasons: 2
- No. of episodes: 14

Production
- Producers: Jean-Pierre Fayer; Fabienne Servan-Schreiber
- Cinematography: Jean-Max Bernard
- Editors: Emmanuelle Labbé; Diane Logan; Aurique Delannoy
- Running time: 55 minutes
- Production company: Cinétévé

Original release
- Network: France 2 (France); La Une (Belgium); Channel 4 (UK; 2015); BBC Four (UK; 2017)
- Release: 22 November 2014 – present

Witnesses (French: Les Témoins) is a French police procedural television series, created by Marc Herpoux and Hervé Hadmar, that premiered in Belgium on La Une on 22 November 2014. Set in the coastal town of Le Tréport in Normandy, France, police detectives Sandra Winckler (Marie Dompnier) and Justin (Jan Hammenecker) investigate when bodies of murder victims are unearthed and left for discovery in the show homes of a housing developer. Former chief-of-police, Paul Maisonneuve (Thierry Lhermitte), is implicated. This series was later broadcast in France on France 2 from 8 March 2015, and from 1 May 2015 Netflix began streaming a subtitled version in the United States. Channel 4 broadcast the series in the United Kingdom from 22 July 2015.

Marie Dompnier won a Golden FIPA award for the best actress in a television series at 2015's Biarritz International Festival of Audiovisual Programming for her role as Sandra Winckler. In March 2016, France 2 announced a second series was in production. This series premiered in France on 15 March 2017. Sandra and Justin find themselves on the trail of a serial killer whose modus operandi is to murder all former lovers of his kidnap victims. Audrey Fleurot and Judith Henry joined the cast. In the UK, this series was broadcast on BBC Four from 25 November 2017.

== Cast ==
- Marie Dompnier as Sandra Winckler
- Jan Hammenecker as Justin
- Alexandre Carrière as Fred
- Florence Bolufer as Melanie

=== Series 1 ===
- Thierry Lhermitte as Paul Maisonneuve
- Laurent Lucas as Kaz Gorbier
- Catherine Mouchet as Maxine "Max" Dubreuil
- Roxane Duran as Laura
- Mehdi Nebbou as Eric
- Frédéric Bouraly as Philippe
- Thomas Doret as Jérémie Gorbier
- Laurent Delbecque as Thomas Maisonneuve

=== Series 2 ===
- Audrey Fleurot as Catherine Keemer
- Judith Henry as Maxine
- Steve Driesen as Oliver Keemer
- Yannick Choirat as Geir Jansen
- Guillaume Durieux as Eric Winckler
- Anne Benoît as Christiane Varène
- Philip Desmeules as Antoine Barrier
- Dominique Bettenfeld as Martin Souriau

== Episodes ==
=== Series 1 (2015) ===
No.	Title	Directed by	Written by	British air date	UK viewers (million)
1	"Episode 1"	Hervé Hadmar	Hervé Hadmar & Marc Herpoux	22 July 2015	1.01
2	"Episode 2"	Hervé Hadmar	Hervé Hadmar & Marc Herpoux	29 July 2015	0.75
3	"Episode 3"	Hervé Hadmar	Hervé Hadmar & Marc Herpoux	5 August 2015	0.72
4	"Episode 4"	Hervé Hadmar	Hervé Hadmar & Marc Herpoux	12 August 2015	N/A
5	"Episode 5"	Hervé Hadmar	Hervé Hadmar & Marc Herpoux	19 August 2015	N/A
6	"Episode 6"	Hervé Hadmar	Hervé Hadmar & Marc Herpoux	26 August 2015	N/A

=== Series 2 (2017) ===
No.	Title	Directed by	Written by	British air date	UK viewers (million)
1	"Episode 1"	Hervé Hadmar	Hervé Hadmar & Marc Herpoux	25 November 2017	1.20
2	"Episode 2"	Hervé Hadmar	Hervé Hadmar & Marc Herpoux	25 November 2017	0.95
3	"Episode 3"	Hervé Hadmar	Hervé Hadmar & Marc Herpoux	2 December 2017	N/A
4	"Episode 4"	Hervé Hadmar	Hervé Hadmar & Marc Herpoux	2 December 2017	N/A
5	"Episode 5"	Hervé Hadmar	Hervé Hadmar & Marc Herpoux	9 December 2017	N/A
6	"Episode 6"	Hervé Hadmar	Hervé Hadmar & Marc Herpoux	9 December 2017	N/A
7	"Episode 7"	Hervé Hadmar	Hervé Hadmar & Marc Herpoux	16 December 2017	N/A
8	"Episode 8"	Hervé Hadmar	Hervé Hadmar & Marc Herpoux	16 December 2017	N/A
