= Parlement (TV series) =

European television series

- Genre: Comedy; Political satire
- Created by: Noé Debré
- Written by: Noé Debré; Daran Johnson; Maxime Calligaro; Pierre Dorac; Lily Lambert
- Starring: Xavier Lacaille; Liz Kingsman; Lucas Englander; Philippe Duquesne; William Nadylam; Christiane Paul; Jane Turner; Koen Van Impe
- Countries of origin: France; Belgium; Germany
- Original languages: French; English; German
- No. of seasons: 4
- No. of episodes: 40

Production
- Running time: 26 minutes
- Production companies: Cinétévé; Artemis Productions; CineCentrum

Original release
- Network: france.tv, BeTV
- Release: April 9, 2020

Parlement is a comedy television series about the inner workings of the European Parliament. It was created by Noé Debré, co-produced in France, Belgium and Germany, and first broadcast in April 2020 on france.tv, the VOD platform of France Télévisions. The show is simultaneously performed in French, English and German.

The series recounts the adventures and misadventures of Samy Kantor, a young French parliamentary assistant, who arrives for his first day in Brussels just after the Brexit referendum. Samy is completely inexperienced, but somehow finds himself responsible for getting an amendment on shark finning passed by the European Parliament. His task is not helped by the fact that his boss, the MEP Michel Specklin, is both incompetent and indifferent. Samy is obliged to learn quickly how to make the right alliances.

== Seasons ==
The first season was broadcast in Germany on One in September 2020.

The second season was filmed between July and September 2021 and broadcast online in France from May 2022 and online in Germany from October 2022 as well as on One in October and November 2022.

The third season was filmed in autumn 2022, partially in Berlaymont, the Commission headquarters.

On February 27, 2024, France TV announced that Parlement would return for a fourth, and final, season. It premiered on BeTV on September 9, 2024.

== Episodes ==
Series	Episodes	Originally released	
Series	Episodes	First released	Last released
1	10	9 April 2020	TBA
2	10	9 May 2022	TBA
3	10	29 September 2023	TBA
4	10	9 September 2024	TBA

=== Season 1 (2020) ===
No.	Title	Directed by	Written by	Original release date
1	"J'ai jamais eu de rapports"	Émilie Noblet	Noé Debré, Daran Johnson, Pierre Dorac, Maxime Calligaro	9 April 2020
2	"L'invincible Armada"	Jérémie Sein	Noé Debré, Daran Johnson, Pierre Dorac, Maxime Calligaro	9 April 2020
3	"La politique et les saucisses"	Émilie Noblet	Noé Debré, Daran Johnson, Pierre Dorac, Maxime Calligaro	9 April 2020
4	"Le plus vieux métier du monde"	Jérémie Sein	Noé Debré, Daran Johnson, Pierre Dorac, Maxime Calligaro	9 April 2020
5	"Demos Kratos"	Émilie Noblet	Noé Debré, Daran Johnson, Pierre Dorac, Maxime Calligaro	9 April 2020
6	"Je suis Sharky"	Jérémie Sein	Noé Debré, Daran Johnson, Pierre Dorac, Maxime Calligaro	9 April 2020
7	"Wild West Wing"	Émilie Noblet	Noé Debré, Daran Johnson, Pierre Dorac, Maxime Calligaro	9 April 2020
8	"Le pacte de stabilité"	Jérémie Sein	Noé Debré, Daran Johnson, Pierre Dorac, Maxime Calligaro	9 April 2020
9	"Strasbourg, Outre-Rhin"	Émilie Noblet	Noé Debré, Daran Johnson, Pierre Dorac, Maxime Calligaro	9 April 2020
10	"C'était un jeune requin"	Émilie Noblet	Noé Debré, Daran Johnson, Pierre Dorac, Maxime Calligaro	9 April 2020

=== Season 2 (2022) ===
No.	Title	Directed by	Written by	Original release date
1	"Top Jobs Magic Circus"	Émilie Noblet	Noé Debré, Lily Lambert, Maxime Calligaro, Pierre Dorac	9 April 2022
2	"Mais qui est ce ??"	Jérémie Sein	Noé Debré, Lily Lambert, Maxime Calligaro, Pierre Dorac	9 April 2022
3	"Les habits neufs du président"	Émilie Noblet	Noé Debré, Lily Lambert, Maxime Calligaro, Pierre Dorac	9 April 2022
4	"Les pingouins"	Jérémie Sein	Noé Debré, Lily Lambert, Maxime Calligaro, Pierre Dorac	9 April 2022
5	"Les chariots en cercle"	Jérémie Sein	Noé Debré, Lily Lambert, Maxime Calligaro, Pierre Dorac	9 April 2022
6	"Objet légiférant non-identifié"	Jérémie Sein	Noé Debré, Lily Lambert, Maxime Calligaro, Pierre Dorac	9 April 2022
7	"Vox populi"	Jérémie Sein	Noé Debré, Lily Lambert, Maxime Calligaro, Pierre Dorac	9 April 2022
8	"La petite vadrouille"	Jérémie Sein	Noé Debré, Lily Lambert, Maxime Calligaro, Pierre Dorac	9 April 2022
9	"La négo"	Noé Debré	Noé Debré, Lily Lambert, Maxime Calligaro, Pierre Dorac	9 April 2022
10	"On va en after ?"	Émilie Noblet	Noé Debré, Lily Lambert, Maxime Calligaro, Pierre Dorac	9 April 2022

=== Season 3 (2023) ===
No.	Title	Directed by	Written by	Original release date
1	"On ne peut plus rien dire"	Jérémie Sein	Maxime Calligaro, Noé Debré, Pierre Dorac, Mareike Engelhardt	29 September 2023
2	"Le background"	Jérémie Sein	Maxime Calligaro, Noé Debré, Pierre Dorac, Mareike Engelhardt	29 September 2023
3	"Ego to absolvo"	Jérémie Sein	Maxime Calligaro, Noé Debré, Pierre Dorac, Mareike Engelhardt	29 September 2023
4	"Le grand départ"	Moritz Parisius	Andrew Bampfield, Noé Debré, Mareike Engelhardt	29 September 2023
5	"Super Pro Brexit"	Amélie Bonnin	Maxime Calligaro, Noé Debré, Pierre Dorac, Mareike Engelhardt	29 September 2023
6	"Riders"	Amélie Bonnin	Maxime Calligaro, Noé Debré, Pierre Dorac, Mareike Engelhardt	29 September 2023
7	"You shall not pass"	Amélie Bonnin	Andrew Bampfield, Maxime Calligaro, Noé Debré, Pierre Dorac, Mareike Engelhardt	29 September 2023
8	"Comme le disait Jean Monnet"	Pierre Dorac	Unknown	29 September 2023
9	"Fish and Ships"	Moritz Parisius	Andrew Bampfield, Maxime Calligaro, Noé Debré, Pierre Dorac, Mareike Engelhardt	29 September 2023
10	"Europe, the musical"	Noé Debré	Maxime Calligaro, Noé Debré, Pierre Dorac, Mareike Engelhardt	29 September 2023

=== Season 4 (2024) ===
No.	Title	Directed by	Written by	Original release date
1	"L'Europe c'est du chinois"	Jérémie Sein	Noé Debré	9 September 2024
2	"Euro Bingo"	Jérôme Pinot	Garance Lamare	9 September 2024
3	"Family photo"	Marie Rosselet-Ruiz	Garance Lamare	16 September 2024
4	"Kaunas"	Pierre Dorac	Garance Lamare	16 September 2024
5	"Deutsche Qualitat"	Moritz Parisius	Garance Lamare	23 September 2024
6	"Justus et moi"	Jérôme Pinot	Garance Lamare	23 September 2024
7	"Bouc émissaire"	Jérôme Pinot	Garance Lamare	30 September 2024
8	"Le sommet de la dernière chance"	Moritz Parisius	Garance Lamare	30 September 2024
9	"Politique quantique"	Jérôme Pinot	Garance Lamare	7 October 2024
10	"Le millepatte Européen"	Jérôme Pinot	Garance Lamare	7 October 2024

== Cast ==
Source: Allocine

- Xavier Lacaille as Samy
- Liz Kingsman as Rose
- Philippe Duquesne as Michel
- William Nadylam as Eamon
- Christiane Paul as Ingeborg
- Lucas Englander as Torsten
- Jane Turner as Sharon
- Niccolo Senni as Guido
- Carole Weyers as Janet
