= Ad Vitam (TV series) =

French-language television series

- Genre: Drama; Science fiction
- Created by: Sébastien Mounier
- Written by: Thomas Cailley; Sébastien Mounier
- Directed by: Thomas Cailley; Manuel Schapira
- Starring: Yvan Attal; Garance Marillier; Niels Schneider
- Music by: HiTnRuN
- Country of origin: France
- Original language: French
- No. of seasons: 1
- No. of episodes: 6

Production
- Producer: Katia Raïs
- Cinematography: Yves Cape
- Editors: Lilian Corbeille; Camille Toubkis
- Running time: 6 x 52 min.
- Production company: Kelija

Original release
- Network: Arte
- Release: November 8 – November 22, 2018

Ad Vitam is a 2018 French-language TV series starring Yvan Attal, Garance Marillier and Niels Schneider. The plot is set in a world where a highly effective medical treatment for aging called "Regeneration" has been discovered. A cop, Darius Asram (Yvan Attal), and a rebellious young woman, Christa Novak (Garance Marillier), are investigating the suicides of seven teenagers.

It was released on November 8, 2018, on Arte, and internationally on Netflix on June 21, 2019 but removed in September 2022.

== Cast ==
- Yvan Attal as Darius Asram
- Garance Marillier as Christa 'Nora' Novak
- Niels Schneider as Virgil 'Caron' Berti
  - Vassili Schneider as Young Virgil
- Victor Assié as Théo Lesky
- Rod Paradot as Léonard 'Linus' Ader
- Anne Azoulay as Béat
- Adel Bencherif as Elias Azuelo
- Julie Moulier as Leyla Perrik
- Ariane Labed as Odessa
- Philippe Laudenbach as Father Samuel
- Hanna Schygulla
- Anthony Bajon as Ian
- Hugo Fernandes as Noé 'Nahel' Müller
- Cyrielle Martinez as Isild
- Benjamin Gauthier as Erik Novak
- Aurélia Petit as Colonel Han
- Jean-Baptiste Anoumon as Angus Singh
- Elise Mollet as Samian
- Alex Martin as Homme de main Odessa
- Bruno Ricci as Charles Vanghen
- Marie Rémond as Hélèna Novak
- Antoine Reinartz as Kenji Takanabé

== Filming location ==
Ad Vitam was filmed in Benidorm and also in and around Paris.
