= Mythomaniac (TV series) =

2019 French-language television mini-series

- Genre: Drama
- Created by: Anne Berest; Fabrice Gobert
- Starring: Marina Hands; Mathieu Demy; Marie Drion
- Country of origin: France
- Original language: French
- No. of seasons: 2
- No. of episodes: 12

Production
- Production company: Unité de Production

Original release
- Network: Arte
- Release: 3 October 2019 – 30 September 2021

Mythomaniac (French: Mytho) is a 2019 French-language television series created by Anne Berest and Fabrice Gobert and starring Marina Hands, Mathieu Demy and Marie Drion.

== Cast ==
- Marina Hands as Elvira
- Mathieu Demy as Patrick
- Marie Drion as Carole
- Jérémy Gillet as Sam
- Zelie Rixhon as Virginie
- Yves Jacques as Mr. Brunet
- Jean-Charles Clichet as Jeff
- Julia Faure as Isa
- Andrea Roncato as Nonno
- Linh Dan Pham as Brigitte
- Fadily Camara
- Françoise Lebrun as The ghost (season 1)
- Marceau Ebersolt as Niklas
- Catherine Mouchet
- Loubna Abidar as Karima
- Amélie Prevot as Hotesse d'accueil hopital
- Daniel Semporé as Henry

== Release ==
Mythomaniac was released on October 3, 2019 on Arte and exclusively on Netflix in November 2019 and season 2 in October 2021 with the series removed in October 2025.
