= Zinedine Soualem =

French actor (born 1957)

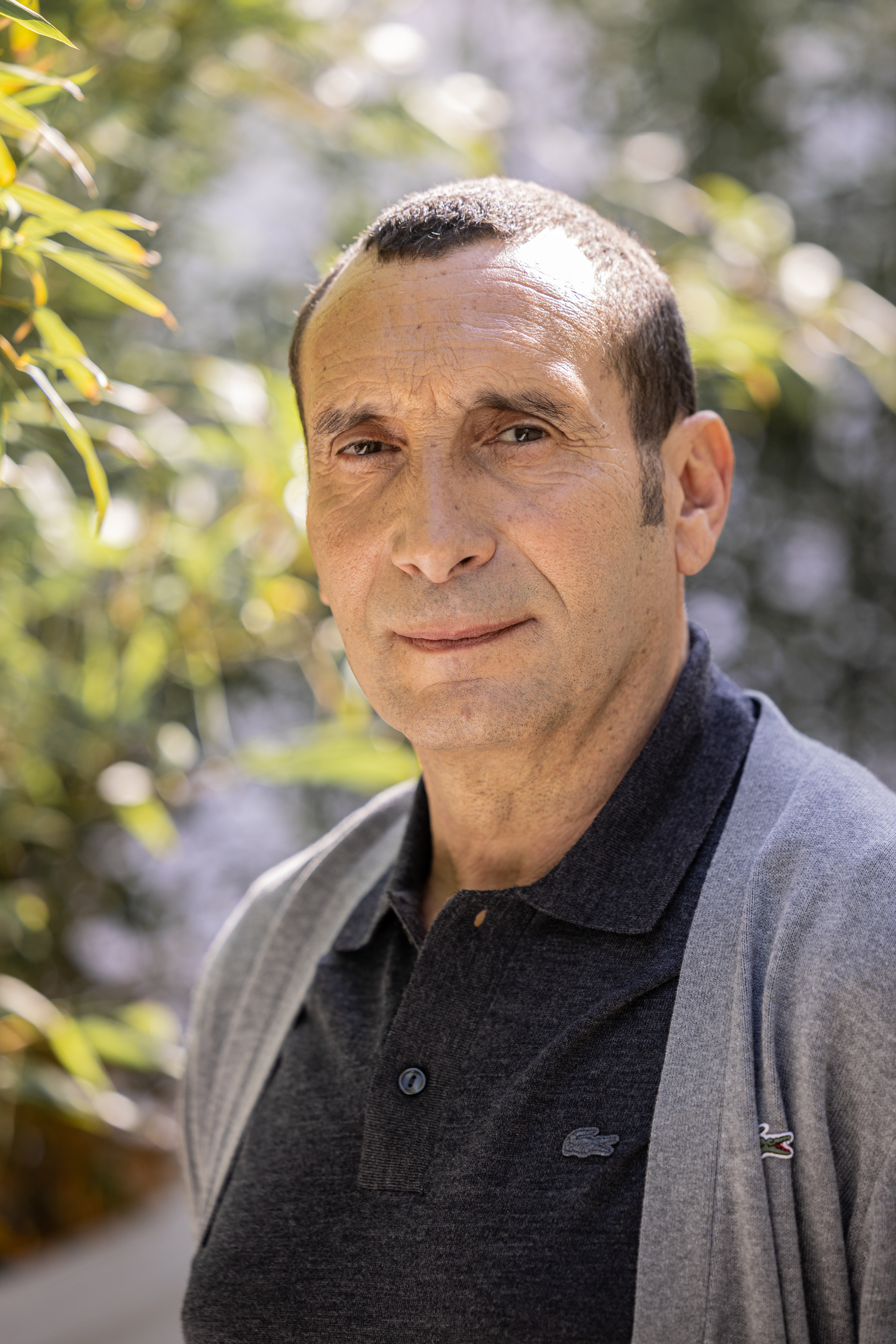
- Zinedine Soualem at the 2025 Cannes Film Festival
- Born: 17 April 1957 (age 68); Thiers, Puy-de-Dôme, France
- Occupation: Actor
- Spouse: Hiam Abbass (divorced)
- Children: Lina; Mouna

Zinedine Soualem (born 17 April 1957) is a French actor. He has appeared in at least five films directed by Cédric Klapisch.

== Personal life ==
Soualem is Algerian by ancestry, and was at one point married to the actress Hiam Abbass. They have two daughters, Lina and Mouna.

== Theatre ==
| Year | Title | Author | Director | Notes |
|---|---|---|---|---|
| 1983 | The Screens | Jean Genet | Patrice Chéreau | Théâtre Nanterre-Amandiers |
| 2002 | Une nuit arabe | Roland Schimmelpfennig | Frédéric Bélier-Garcia | Théâtre du Rond-Point |
| 2003–04 | La Vie de chantier | Dany Boon | Dany Boon | Théâtre du Gymnase Marie Bell |
| 2013 | Boire, fumer et conduire vite | Philippe Lellouche | Marion Sarraut | |

== Filmography ==
| Year | Title | Role | Director | Notes |
|---|---|---|---|---|
| 1983 | La bête noire | Santiago | Patrick Chaput | |
| 1983 | Hanna K. | The Sergeant | Costa-Gavras | |
| 1989 | La nuit miraculeuse | | Ariane Mnouchkine | TV movie |
| 1989 | Ce qui me meut | | Cédric Klapisch | Short |
| 1992 | Riens du tout | Aziz | Cédric Klapisch (2) | |
| 1993 | Antoine Rives, juge du terrorisme | Joseph Nourredine Bassili | Philippe Lefebvre | TV series (1 episode) |
| 1993 | Les gens normaux n'ont rien d'exceptionnel | | Laurence Ferreira Barbosa | |
| 1993 | Un'anima divisa in due | Abid | Silvio Soldini | |
| 1994 | 3000 scénarios contre un virus | A client | Cédric Klapisch (3) | TV series (1 episode) |
| 1994 | Le Péril jeune | | Cédric Klapisch (4) | |
| 1994 | Daisy et Mona | | Claude d'Anna | |
| 1995 | Le R.I.F. | The restaurant's owner | Roger Guillot | TV series (1 episode) |
| 1995 | Le rocher d'Acapulco | Ahmed | Laurent Tuel | |
| 1995 | La Haine | Plainclothes Police Officer | Mathieu Kassovitz | |
| 1995 | Fast | Mourad | Dante Desarthe | |
| 1995 | Les apprentis | Waiter | Pierre Salvadori | |
| 1995 | Sept ans et demi de réflexion | Omar | Sylvie Flepp | Short |
| 1995 | Le jour et la nuit | | Éric Toledano and Olivier Nakache | |
| 1996 | Le voyage de Pénélope | Car seller | Patrick Volson | TV movie |
| 1996 | L'échappée belle | The lawyer | Étienne Dhaene | |
| 1996 | When the Cat's Away | Djamel | Cédric Klapisch (5) | Nominated - Acteurs à l'Écran - Best Actor |
| 1996 | Julie Lescaut | Sandwich man | Josée Dayan | TV series (1 episode) |
| 1996 | Caméléone | The attendant | Benoît Cohen | |
| 1996 | Family Resemblances | A consumer | Cédric Klapisch (6) | |
| 1996 | Hara-Kiri | | Yves Fajnberg | Short |
| 1996 | À cloche pied | | Eric Canda | Short |
| 1997 | Eau douce | | Marie Vermillard | |
| 1997 | Didier | Camel Mimouni | Alain Chabat | |
| 1997 | Les randonneurs | The animator | Philippe Harel | |
| 1997 | Tenue correcte exigée | Taxi driver | Philippe Lioret | |
| 1997 | The Banned Woman | The ticket's man | Philippe Harel (2) | |
| 1997 | Liberté chérie | | Jean-Luc Gaget | Short |
| 1997 | Le ciel est à nous | Hippy | Graham Guit | |
| 1997 | Mauvais genre | Momo | Laurent Bénégui | |
| 1997 | Le silence de Rak | The first consumer | Christophe Loizillon | |
| 1997 | Messieurs les enfants | Nourdine Kader / Ismaël Kader | Pierre Boutron | |
| 1997 | Je ne vois pas ce qu'on me trouve | Farid | Christian Vincent | |
| 1997 | Enquête d'audience | Prison guard | Laurent Pellicer | Short |
| 1997 | Chantal! | | Zaïda Ghorab-Volta & Marie Vermillard (2) | Short |
| 1998 | Ivre mort pour la patrie | | Vincent Hachet | TV Short |
| 1998 | La voie est libre | Karim | Stéphane Clavier | |
| 1998 | Le jour de Noël | | Thierry Jousse | Short |
| 1998 | Serial Lover | Prince Hakim | James Huth | |
| 1998 | Le clone | Elias | Fabio Conversi | |
| 1998 | Que la lumière soit | God dustman | Arthur Joffé | |
| 1998 | Ça commence à bien faire! | Max | Patrick Volson (2) | TV movie |
| 1998 | Le ramoneur des lilas | The husband | Cédric Klapisch (7) | Short |
| 1998 | Histoire naturelle | | Karim Boulila | Short |
| 1998 | Arrêt demandé | | Emmanuel Bonhomme | Short |
| 1999 | Lila Lili | Alain | Marie Vermillard (3) | |
| 1999 | Trafic d'influence | Gilles | Dominique Farrugia | |
| 1999 | Mes amis | Areski | Michel Hazanavicius | |
| 1999 | Peut-être | Kader | Cédric Klapisch (8) | |
| 1999 | Les pierres qui tombent du ciel | | Isabelle Ponnet | Short |
| 2000 | La pomme, la figue et l'amande | The man | Joël Brisse | Short |
| 2000 | Banqueroute | Mohamed | Antoine Desrosières | |
| 2000 | Euroland | | Laurent Paty | Short |
| 2000 | Deuxième quinzaine de juillet | Félix | Christophe Reichert | |
| 2000 | Elie annonce Semoun | Various | Élie Semoun | TV series |
| 2000 | Génération cutter | | Mabrouk El Mechri | Short |
| 2000 | C'est pas si compliqué | Farid | Xavier De Choudens | Short |
| 2001 | Ligne 208 | Mohammed | Bernard Dumont | |
| 2001 | Mademoiselle | Karim Coutard | Philippe Lioret | |
| 2001 | Le pain | | Hiam Abbass | Short |
| 2001 | Voyance et manigance | Roland Bardet | Eric Fourniols | |
| 2001 | J'ai tué Clémence Acéra | Jimmy | Jean-Luc Gaget (2) | |
| 2001 | Tar Angel (L'ange de goudron) | Ahmed Kasmi | Denis Chouinard | Nominated - Genie Award for Best Performance by an Actor; Nominated - Jutra Award for Best Actor |
| 2001 | Inch'Allah Dimanche | Ahmed | Yamina Benguigui | |
| 2001 | Imago | Male apartment | Marie Vermillard (4) | |
| 2001 | La gardienne du B | Nabil | Joël Brisse (2) | Short |
| 2002 | Le ballon prisonnier | | Cyril Gelblat | Short |
| 2002 | La maîtresse en maillot de bain | Alain | Lyèce Boukhitine | |
| 2002 | Asterix & Obelix: Mission Cleopatra | The tiler | Alain Chabat (2) | |
| 2002 | Red Satin | Cabaret's owner | Raja Amari | |
| 2002 | L'indien | | Thierry Dupety | Short |
| 2002 | L'Auberge Espagnole | Barman | Cédric Klapisch (9) | |
| 2002 | Ma caméra et moi | Max | Christophe Loizillon (2) | |
| 2002 | If I Were a Rich Man | Kader Benhassine | Gérard Bitton & Michel Munz | |
| 2002 | Coup franc indirect | | Youcef Hamidi | |
| 2003 | La légende de Parva | Bandit | Jean Cubaud | |
| 2003 | Not For, or Against (Quite the Contrary) | Mouss | Cédric Klapisch (10) | |
| 2003 | La vie en gros | The French teacher | Didier Bivel | TV movie |
| 2003 | Zéro un | Darshan Kumar | Christophe Campos | |
| 2003 | Concours de circonstance | | Mabrouk El Mechri (2) | Short |
| 2004 | L'Incruste | Mickey | Alexandre Castagnetti & Corentin Julius | |
| 2004 | Ne quittez pas! | The neighbor | Arthur Joffé (2) | |
| 2004 | La vie de chantier | Pedro Pinto | Christian Auxéméry & Dany Boon | |
| 2004 | Le grand huit | Pierre's father | Karim Boulila (2) | Short |
| 2005 | Russian Dolls | M. Boubaker | Cédric Klapisch (11) | Nominated - Chlotrudis Awards - Best Ensemble Cast |
| 2005 | The Demon Stirs | Samir | Marie-Pascale Osterrieth | |
| 2005 | Emmenez-moi | Boris | Edmond Bensimon | |
| 2005 | Vive la vie | Rachid | Yves Fajnberg (2) | |
| 2005 | Vénus & Apollon | Daniel Varela | Various | TV series (15 episodes) |
| 2005 | Olé! | CL500's driver | Florence Quentin | |
| 2005 | Mes voeux les plus sincères | Pierre | Arnaud Cassand | Short |
| 2006 | Petites révélations | | Marie Vermillard (5) | |
| 2006 | La Maison du Bonheur | Mouloud Mami | Dany Boon (2) | |
| 2006 | L'État de Grace | Jean-Jacques Chrétien | Pascal Chaumeil | TV mini-series |
| 2006 | The Nativity Story | Girl's Father | Catherine Hardwicke | |
| 2007 | Élodie Bradford | Franck Bécker | Olivier Guignard | TV series (1 episode) |
| 2007 | To Each His Own Cinema | The father | Claude Lelouch | |
| 2007 | The Diving Bell and the Butterfly | Joubert | Julian Schnabel | Nominated - International Cinephile Society Awards - Best Ensemble |
| 2007 | Roman de Gare | The Commissioner | Claude Lelouch (2) | |
| 2007 | 1 Journée | Inspector Haddid | Jacob Berger | |
| 2008 | Bienvenue chez les Ch'tis | Momo | Dany Boon (3) | |
| 2008 | Paris | Mourad | Cédric Klapisch (12) | |
| 2008 | JCVD | Man with the Hat | Mabrouk El Mechri (3) | |
| 2008 | J'ai pensé à vous tous les jours | Joseph Souhad | Jérôme Foulon | TV movie |
| 2009 | 5 à 7 | The groom | Audrey Dana | Short |
| 2009 | Tricheuse | Farid | Jean-François Davy | |
| 2009 | Myster Mocky présente | | Jean-Pierre Mocky | TV series short (1 episode) |
| 2009 | Moloch Tropical | Jean de Dieu Théogène | Raoul Peck | TV movie |
| 2009 | Divorces! | Marc | Valérie Guignabodet | |
| 2010 | Suite parlée | The Thread | Joël Brisse (3) & Marie Vermillard (6) | |
| 2010 | Pas si simple | Mostepha | Rachida Krim | TV movie |
| 2010 | The Names of Love | Mohamed Benhmamoud | Michel Leclerc | |
| 2010 | What War May Bring | The accordionist | Claude Lelouch (3) | |
| 2010 | Opération Casablanca | Hassan | Laurent Nègre | |
| 2010 | Nothing to Declare | Lucas Pozzi | Dany Boon (4) | |
| 2011 | La grève des femmes | François Blanchet | Stéphane Kappes | TV movie |
| 2011 | My Piece of the Pie | Ahmed | Cédric Klapisch (13) | |
| 2011 | La Proie | Lucciani | Eric Valette | |
| 2012 | Manipulations | Commissioner Brindier | Laurent Herbiet | TV movie |
| 2012 | Télé gaucho | Jimmy | Michel Leclerc (2) | |
| 2012 | Max | Mario | Stéphanie Murat | |
| 2013 | Mood Indigo | The plant manager | Michel Gondry | |
| 2013 | Les oliviers | Ali Djakoua | Joël Brisse (4) | Short |
| 2013 | Chinese Puzzle | M. Boubakeur | Cédric Klapisch (14) | |
| 2013 | VDM | | Fouad Benhammou | TV series (1 episode) |
| 2013 | Samarkande | The Caliph | Christophe Arnould | Short |
| 2013 | La chose sûre | The serial killer | Cédric Klapisch (15) | Short |
| 2014 | On verra bien si on se noie | Woreck | Hugo Becker | Short |
| 2014 | Du goudron et des plumes | Patrick Fellous | Pascal Rabaté | |
| 2014 | Murder in Pacot | Leonetti | Raoul Peck (2) | |
| 2014 | The Lies of the Victors | Dan | Christoph Hochhäusler | |
| 2015 | I'm All Yours | Omar | Baya Kasmi | |
| 2015 | Call My Agent ! | Himself | Lola Doillon & Cédric Klapisch (16) | TV series (2 episodes) |
| 2015 | Chefs | Karim | Arnaud Malherbe | TV series (6 episodes) |
| 2016 | D'une pierre deux coups | | Fejria Deliba | |
| 2017 | Chacun sa vie et son intime conviction | Zinedine | Claude Lelouch (4) | |
| 2017 | Épouse-moi mon pote | Yassine's father | Tarek Boudali | |
| 2019 | Someone, Somewhere (Deux moi) | The pharmacists | Cédric Klapisch (17) | |
| 2021 | You Resemble Me | Army Officer | Dina Amer | |
| 2022 | Umami | Mohammad | Slony Sow | |
