= Sayyid El Alami =

French actor (born 1998)

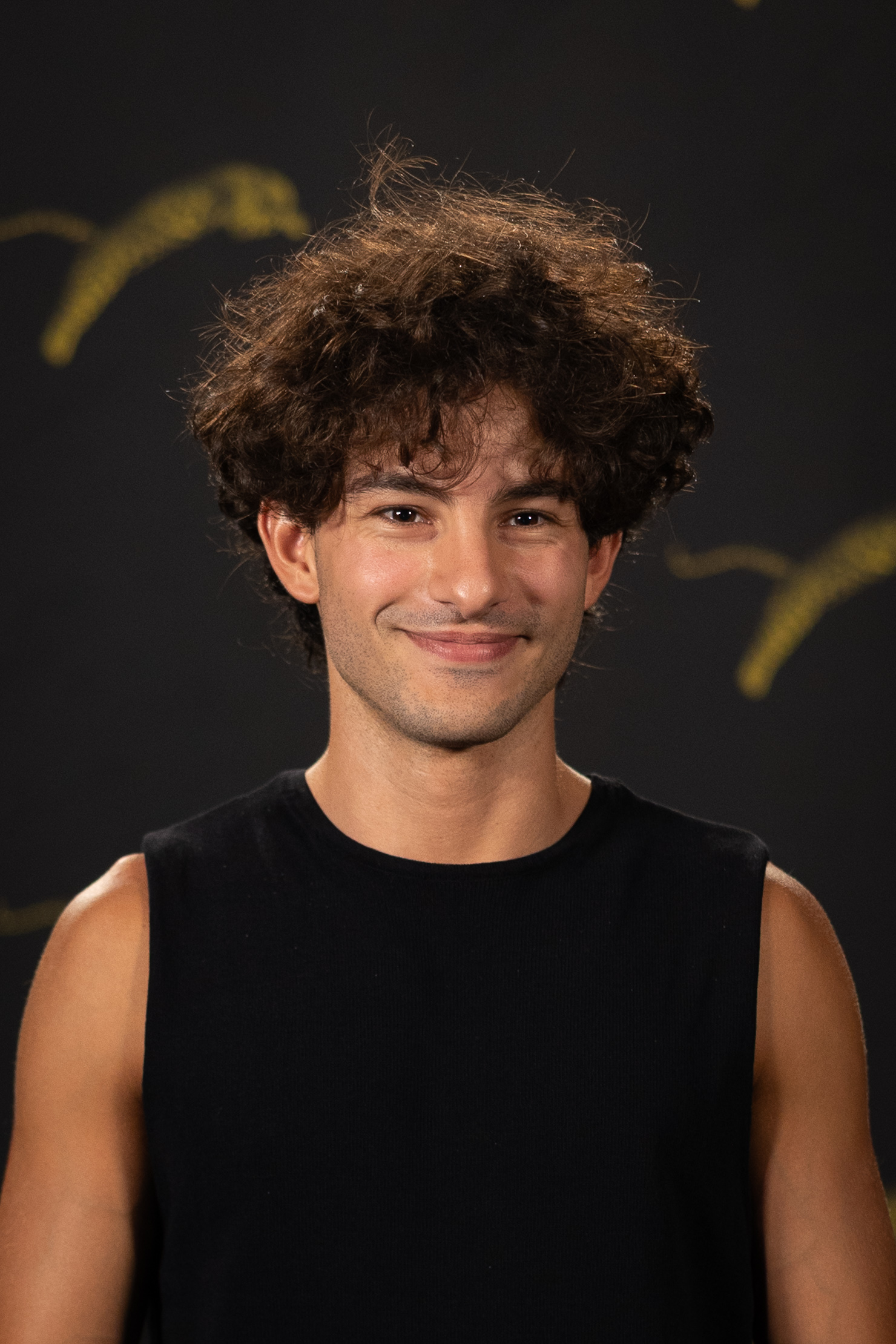
- El Alami at 79th Locarno Film Festival, 2026.
- Born: 1998 (age 27–28); Toulouse, France
- Occupation: Actor
- Years active: 2017–present

Sayyid El Alami (French: [sajid ɛl alami]; born 1998) is a French and Moroccan actor. He is known for his starring roles in the American thriller television series Messiah (2020) and the French historical drama miniseries Oussekine (2022). His performance in the coming-of-age drama film And Their Children After Them (2024) earned him a nomination for the Lumière Award for Best Male Revelation.

== Early life ==
Sayyid El Alami was born in 1998 in Toulouse and grew up in Colomiers. The son of Moroccan immigrant parents, he is the youngest of six siblings. He has credited his mother, Chafia, with instilling in him a passion for the art of cinema.

El Alami initially wanted to become a professional soccer player, but was soon discouraged by his parents. At the age of 12, he took his first acting lessons at the Maison des Jeunes et de la Culture in his neighborhood. After finishing high school, El Alami moved to Paris and signed up for 1000 Visages, an organization founded by actress Houda Benyamina aimed at making the film industry more accessible.

== Career ==
El Alami made his feature film debut in a minor role in the 2018 dramedy Mr. Know-It-All (Monsieur je-sais-tout), followed by appearances in the short films Basses by Félix Imbert, premiered at the 2018 Cannes Directors' Fortnight, Pas si loin by Thierry Préval, and 2 minutes 30 by Mehdi Fikri. In 2019, El Alami appeared in the drama Zombi Child directed by Bertrand Bonello.

After a long series of auditions, El Alami gained recognition in 2020 for his role in the Netflix thriller television series Messiah, created by Michael Petroni. He portrayed Jibril Medina, a Palestinian refugee who encounters a mysterious stranger perceived by some as the new Messiah. In 2021, El Alami starred in Al Hadi Ulad-Mohand's drama Life Suits Me Well, and appeared in a short film titled Les engloutis, directed by Caroline Guiela Nguyen. He also made a guest appearance in the first episode of the second season of the British drama television series Baptiste.

In January 2022, El Alami starred in the TV mini-series Une si longue nuit, a TF1 remake of the police procedural crime drama television series Criminal Minds. He played Sami, a student from Marseille who becomes the prime suspect in the murder of a young woman following a night of heavy drinking. That same month, he appeared as Cédric in a guest role during the seventh episode of the second season of the Canal+ television series Narvalo. In May of the same year, El Alami starred in Paul Doucet's action thriller The Pilot (Pilote).

He also starred as the titular character in the historical drama miniseries Oussekine, which centers on the 1986 murder of student Malik Oussekine by French police. Director Antoine Chevrollier selected El Alami for the role due to his modernity and political awareness. In his final performance of 2022, he appeared in Hakim Mao's short film Idiot Fish. El Alami had a supporting role in Lisa Azuelos' 2023 drama The Book of Wonders (La Chambre des merveilles).

In 2024, he appeared in a minor role in the British television limited series A Gentleman in Moscow, based on the 2016 novel by Amor Towles. El Alami collaborated again with Antoine Chevrollier in his feature film directorial debut, Block Pass (La Pampa), which premiered during the Critics' Week program at the 2024 Cannes Film Festival. He also starred alongside Paul Kircher in Ludovic and Zoran Boukherma's coming-of-age And Their Children After Them (Leurs enfants après eux). The film had its world premiere at the 81st Venice Film Festival. For his portrayal of Hacine, El Alami earned his first nomination for the Lumière Award for Best Male Revelation.

In January 2025, El Alami was named one of Unifrance's 10 new French talents to follow. He will star next in Thomas Vernay's Fief, an adaptation of the novel by David Lopez, and in a project directed by Ismael El Iraki.

== Filmography ==
Key
†	Denotes productions that have not yet been released

=== Film ===
Year	Title	Role	Notes
2017	The Angels		Short film
2018	Ghost Mode		Short film
2018	Mr. Know-It-All	Shérif	
2018	Basses	Théo	Short film
2018	Pas si loin	Samir	Short film
2018	2 minutes 30	Driss	Short film
2019	Zombi Child	Pablo	
2021	Life Suits Me Well	Ismaïl	
2021	Les engloutis	Antho	Short film
2022	The Pilot	Rayan	
2022	Idiot Fish	Dylan	Short film
2023	The Book of Wonders	Lock	
2024	Block Pass	Willy	
2024	And Their Children After Them	Hacine Bouali	
2026	The Green Eyes	Nour	
TBA	Fief †		
TBA	Untitled Ismael El Iraki project †		

=== Television ===
Year	Title	Role	Notes
2020	Messiah	Jibril Hassan	Main cast
2021	Baptiste	French Teenager	1 episode
2022	Une si longue nuit	Sami Kacem	Mini-series
2022	Narvalo	Cédric	Episode: "Nuit blanche"
2022	Oussekine	Malik Oussekine	Mini-series
2024	A Gentleman in Moscow	Ilya	2 episodes

== Awards and nominations ==
Award	Date of ceremony	Category	Title	Result	Ref.
Cinemania	16 November 2024	Best Actor	Block Pass	Won	
Lumière Awards	20 January 2025	Best Male Revelation	And Their Children After Them	Nominated	
Series Mania	21 November 2022	Best Revelation Actor	Oussekine	Nominated	
Series Mania	21 November 2022	Best Revelation Actor	Une si longue nuit	Nominated	
