= JCVD (film) =

- Theatrical release poster
- Directed by: Mabrouk el Mechri
- Written by: Frédéric Bénudis; Mabrouk el Mechri; Christophe Turpin
- Produced by: Sidonie Dumas; Fiszman Marc; Patrick Quinet; Jani Thiltges; Jean-Claude Van Damme; Arlette Zylberberg
- Starring: Jean-Claude Van Damme; François Damiens; Zinedine Soualem
- Cinematography: Pierre-Yves Bastard
- Edited by: Kako Kelber
- Music by: Gast Waltzing
- Production companies: Gaumont; RTBF
- Distributed by: Gaumont Distribution (France); Peace Arch Entertainment (North America)
- Release date: 4 June 2008
- Running time: 96 minutes
- Countries: Belgium; France; Luxembourg
- Languages: French; English
- Budget: $12 million
- Box office: $2.3 million

JCVD is a 2008 satirical black comedy crime drama film directed by Mabrouk el Mechri from a script he wrote with Frédéric Bénudis and Christophe Turpin. It stars Jean-Claude Van Damme as a fictionalized version of himself: a down and out action star whose family and career are crumbling around him as he is caught in the middle of a post office heist in his hometown of Brussels, Belgium.

The film was screened on 4 June 2008 in Belgium and France, at the 2008 Toronto International Film Festival, and at the Adelaide Film Festival on 20 February 2009. It was distributed by Peace Arch Entertainment from Toronto and opened in New York and select cities on 7 November 2008. The film was Van Damme's first movie to receive a wide theatrical release since Universal Soldier: The Return (1999). Despite performing poorly at the box office, the film received positive reviews; Van Damme's performance received critical acclaim.

== Plot ==
The film establishes Jean-Claude Van Damme playing himself as an out-of-luck actor. He is out of money; his agent cannot find him a decent production; and the judge in a custody battle is inclined to give custody of his daughter over to his ex-wife. His own daughter rejects him as a father. To start over, he returns to his childhood home of Schaerbeek in the Brussels capital region, Belgium, where he is still considered a hero.

After posing for pictures with clerks outside a video store, Van Damme goes into the post office across the street. A shot is fired inside the post office, and a police officer responds but is waved off by Van Damme at the window, which is then blocked. The officer calls for backup.

The narrative then shifts to Van Damme's point of view. He goes into the post office to receive a badly needed wire transfer but finds that the bank is being robbed. He is taken hostage along with the other customers. The police mistakenly identify Van Damme as the robber when he is forced by the actual perpetrators to move a cabinet to block the window. Van Damme finds himself acting as a hero to protect the hostages by engaging with the robbers about his career (one of them being a fan of his), as well as both a negotiator and presumed perpetrator. While speaking by phone as the ringleader of the robbers, Van Damme even goes so far as to demand $465,000 for the law firm handling his custody case. It is not clear if Van Damme demands the $465,000 out of self-interest, or out of a desire to appear as a genuine bank-robber to the police as he insists to the thieves, or perhaps both.

The narrative continues to shift to show the media circus that develops around the post office and video store, which the police use as a base of operations, enhanced by the involvement of the actor. Archive footage showing him talking in a typically weird and cryptic way during French language interviews are shown on TV, to Van Damme's dismay.

In a notable scene, Van Damme and the camera are lifted above the set, and he performs a six-minute single-take monologue, where he breaks the fourth wall, addressing the audience, or God, or both, with an emotional (but characteristically cryptic) monologue about his career, his multiple marriages, and his drug abuse, connecting his reflections with the current hostage situation where he is afraid of dying in such an absurd manner.

Van Damme then persuades one of the bank robbers to release the hostages. After this happens, a scuffle ensues and in the resulting conflict, the head robber is shot by his partner. The police, after hearing a gunshot, storm the building. The police shoot another one of the thieves, and Van Damme is held at gunpoint by the final one. Van Damme briefly imagines a scenario in which he takes down the robber with an action-movie style kick, whereupon everyone including the police and crowd cheer for him, but in reality, he just elbows him in the stomach and the police take him into custody.

Van Damme is arrested for extortion over the $465,000 and sentenced to one year in prison. The final scenes show him teaching martial arts to other inmates, then being visited by his mother and daughter.

== Cast ==
- Jean-Claude Van Damme as a fictionalized version of himself
- François Damiens as Bruges
- Zinedine Soualem as The Man with the Cap
- Karim Belkhadra as The Vigil
- Jean-François Wolff as The Thirty
- Anne Paulicevich as The Teller
- Saskia Flanders as Van Damme's daughter
- Dean Gregory as the Director of Tobey Wood
- Kim Hermans as the Prisoner in kickboxing outfit
- Steve Preston as Van Damme's Assistant
- Paul Rockenbrod as Tobey Wood
- Alan Rossett as Bernstein
- Jesse Joe Walsh as Jeff
- Isabelle de Hertogh as The Toys Store Manager

== Production ==
The concept for the film originated from a producer who had an agreement with Van Damme to play himself in a movie. The producer, knowing El Mechri was a Van Damme fan, asked him to review the original screenplay. The screenwriters had perceived Van Damme as merely a clown, but El Mechri felt that there was more to Van Damme than just what people knew from his big screen action-hero persona and TV antics.

El Mechri, who was influenced by Jean-Luc Godard, offered to write a draft, and the producer asked if he would direct it as well. El Mechri agreed on the condition he could meet Van Damme first before starting the draft, so he would not waste six months on something that Van Damme might veto. El Mechri and Van Damme had dinner, where the idea of the bank heist and not knowing what has happened inside was pitched. Van Damme was thrilled with the concept. After watching El Mechri's previous film, Virgil, he immediately went to work with the French director.

During Van Damme's six-minute, one-take monologue, he references past drug problems. In real life, Van Damme had troubles with cocaine during 1995, entering a month-long rehab program in 1996 but leaving after just one week. His performance in the movie, and the sequence in particular, were unanimously praised by critics and audiences as well as fellow actors like Nicolas Cage and Anna Kendrick. In addition, El Mechri stated that about 70% of the film was scripted, and the other 30% was improvised from the actors. Most of the ad-libs came from Van Damme.

The Gaumont title sequence was altered for this film. The normal sequence has a silhouetted boy pulling a daisy from the ground, which floats to space to become the company logo. In this film, the boy is confronted by a silhouetted Van Damme, who attempts to take the daisy from him. When the boy resists, Van Damme does a roundhouse kick on him and kicks the daisy upwards, where it becomes the company logo.

== Reception ==
=== Critical response ===
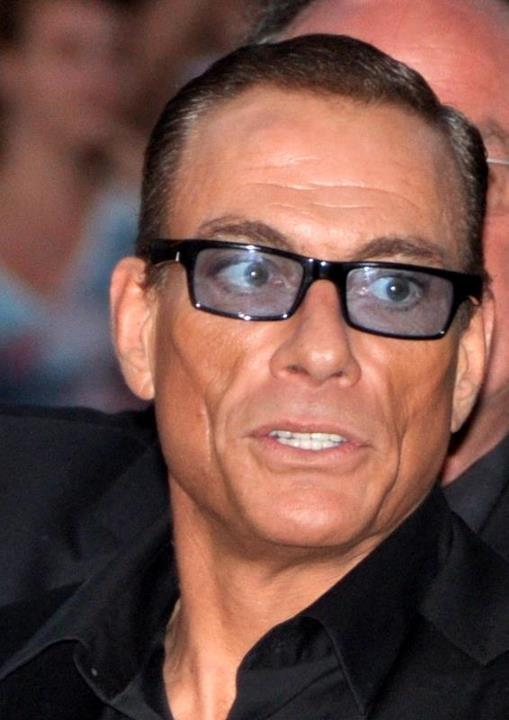
Jean-Claude Van Damme's performance received critical acclaim, with critics highlighting it as a career-best for the actor.

Reviews for JCVD have been positive. On Rotten Tomatoes, the film has a rating of 83% based on 109 reviews with an average rating of 6.9/10. The website's critical consensus reads, "JCVD is a touching, fascinating piece, with Jean-Claude Van Damme confounding all with his heartfelt performance." On Metacritic, the film has a score of 64 based on reviews from 26 critics.

Peter Bradshaw reviewed the film for The Guardian and called the monologue "a Godardian coup de cinéma", describing the film as "inter-textual and self-referential". Richard Corliss of Time magazine named Van Damme's performance in the film the second best of the year (after Heath Ledger's The Joker in The Dark Knight), having previously stated that Van Damme "deserves not a black belt, but an Oscar". Roger Ebert gave the film 2.5 stars, noting that the movie "almost endearingly savages" Van Damme, who "says worse things about himself than critics would dream of saying, and the effect is shockingly truthful".

=== Box office ===
Despite the general critical acclaim, the film performed poorly at the box office, grossing $2.3 million against a budget of $12 million.
