= DOXA Feature Documentary Award =

Annual Canadian film award

The DOXA Feature Documentary Award is an annual Canadian film award, presented to honour the best international feature documentary film screened at that year's DOXA Documentary Film Festival. The award frequently, but not always, presents an honorable mention in addition to the overall winner.

A separate award, the Colin Low Award, is presented for Canadian feature documentaries.

== Winners ==
Year	Film	Filmmaker(s)	Ref
2013	Fire in the Blood	Dylan Mohan Gray	
2014	Virunga	Orlando von Einsiedel	
2014	The Return to Homs	Talal Derki	
2015	I Am the People	Anna Roussillon	
2015	Cain's Children	Marcell Gerö	
2016	Cameraperson	Kirsten Johnson	
2016	The Woods Dreams Are Made Of (Le Bois dont les rêves sont faits)	Claire Simon	
2017	Horse-Being (Être cheval)	Jérôme Clément-Wilz	
2017	Miss Kiet's Children	Petra Lataster-Czisch, Peter Lataster	
2018	The Creator of Universes	Mercedes Dominioni	
2018	Distant Constellation	Shevaun Mizrahi	
2019	Greetings from Free Forests	Ian Soroka	
2019	Midnight Traveler	Hassan Fazili	
2020	Overseas	Sung-A Yoon	
2021	Father	Deng Wei	
2022	Children of the Mist	Diễm Hà Lệ	
2022	We Don't Dance for Nothing	Stefanos Tai	
2023	Notes on Displacement	Khaled Jarrar	
2023	The Golden Thread	Nishtha Jain	
2024	Bye Bye Tiberias	Lina Soualem	
2024	Kamay	Ilyas Yourish, Shahrokh Bikaraan	
2024	The Stimming Pool	Steven Eastwood, The Neurocultures Collective	
2025	Sudan, Remember Us	Hind Meddeb	
2025	Mistress Dispeller	Elizabeth Lo	
2025	To Use a Mountain	Casey Carter	
2026	And the Fish Fly Above Our Heads	Dima El-Horr	
2026	Ça reste entre nous	Maryam Shapoorian	
