= Foreign body (disambiguation) =

A foreign body, in physiology, any object originating outside a human or animal body.

The terms foreign body, foreign bodies, or foreign object may also refer to:

== Media ==
- Foreign Body (1986 film), a 1986 film directed by Ronald Neame, based on 1975 Roderick Mann's eponymous 1975 novel
- Foreign Body (2016 film), a 2016 Tunisian film
- Foreign Body (Cook novel), a novel by Robin Cook
- Foreign Bodies (Amanda Craig book), a book by Amanda Craig
- Foreign Bodies (Barbara Harrison novel), a novel by Barbara Grizzuti Harrison
- Foreign Bodies, a novel by Cynthia Ozick
- Foreign Bodies, a novel by Hwee Hwee Tan
- Foreign Bodies, 2001 orchestral composition by Esa-Pekka Salonen
- Foreign Body (album), 2012 collaborative album of Grouper and Tiny Vipers under their pseudonym Mirroring
- Foreign Body (web series), a 2008 webseries and prequel to eponymous Robin Cook's 2009 novel

== Other uses ==
- Foreign object (professional wrestling), any outside object introduced into a match meant to give the user an unfair advantage
- Foreign object damage, in aerospace or engineering, damage to a vehicle or device caused by any object not part of it
