= Anna Maria Hawa =

Palestinian actress

Anna Maria Hawa is a Palestinian actress best known for the role of Omar's sister in Hany Abu-Assad's film Omar, which made the 86th Academy Awards's shortlist for Best Foreign Language Film. She also appeared in Inheritance.

== Filmography ==
- Inheritance (2012)
- Omar (2013)
