= Mouna Soualem =

French actress

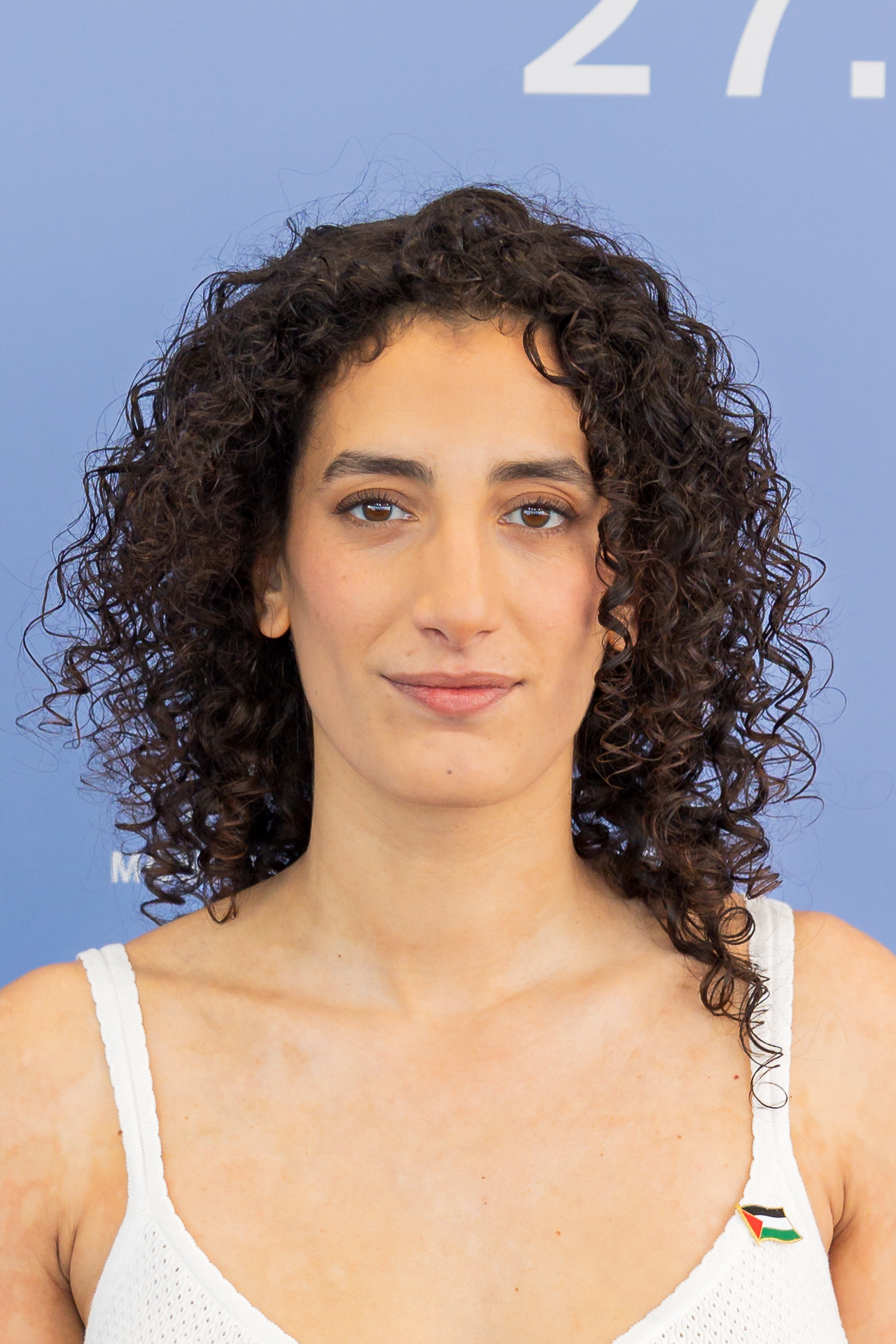
- Soualem in 2025
- Occupation: Actress
- Years active: 2005–present
- Parents: Zinedine Soualem (father); Hiam Abbas (mother)
- Relatives: Lina Soualem (sister)

Mouna Soualem is a French film and television actress.

== Early life and education ==
Soualem is the daughter of actors Hiam Abbas and Zinedine Soualem and sister of actress/filmmaker Lina Soualem. She is of Palestinian descent on her mother's side and Algerian descent on her father's. Her maternal grandmother and great-grandmother were displaced from Tiberias during the Nakba. Soualem's mother would speak Palestinian Arabic at home, and the family regularly holidayed in Auvergne and Palestine.

After obtaining her baccalaureate, Soualem studied for a degree in cinema at the University of Paris 8 and trained at the Conservatoire du 5 arrondissement in Paris. She then took acting classes at the Stella Adler Studio of Acting in New York. Soualem has stated that she knew she wanted to become an actress since childhood. She credits her parents with inspiring her decision to pursue acting, while emphasizing that they did not impose this path upon her: "It's a passion for this profession that I inherited, which they passed on to me in a very healthy fashion, encouraging me and supporting me as soon as I spoke to them about it"

== Career ==
Soualem made her acting debut in Steven Spielberg's Munich (2005), in which her mother also appeared in a minor role. In 2012, she starred alongside her sister Lina in their mother's feature directorial debut Inheritance.

In 2019, she starred in Hafsia Herzi's You Deserve a Lover, which premiered as a special screening of Critics' Week at the 2019 Cannes Film Festival.

In 2022, she played the role of Sarah Oussekine in the Disney+ miniseries Oussekine, centering on the killing of Malik Oussekine. For her performance, she was awarded Best Actress at the 2022 ACS Awards. That same year, she starred in Dominik Moll's César-winning The Night of the 12th, which screened in the Cannes Premiere section at the 2022 Cannes Film Festival.

In 2023, she performed in New York in Broken Theater, a dance-theater production directed by Bobbi Jene Smith.

In 2024, she had a small role in The Last Breath, directed by Costa-Gavras. In December 2024, Soualem was announced to star in her sister's debut feature, Alicante.

In April 2025, she appeared in the Canal+ series Cimetière indien, starring in the lead role of Lidia Achour, a young police officer in an anti-terrorism squad who is sent to investigate the scalping of an imam near Marseille. The 8-episode series, directed by Stéphane Demoustier and Farid Bentoumi, takes place in 1995 and 2024 and touches on the legacy of the Algerian War and Algerian Civil War. Soualem also appeared in Hafsia Herzi's The Little Sister, which was screened in the main competition at the 2025 Cannes Film Festival, where it won the Queer Palm.

== Filmography ==
=== Film ===
Year	Title	Role	Notes	Ref.
2005	Munich	Amina Hamshari		
2008	One Day You'll Understand	Esther		
2012	Inheritance	Lana		
2013	Taxi Dancer		Short	
2019	You Deserve a Lover	Mouna		
2019	Amal		Short	
2020	Aviva	Briana		
2021	You Resemble Me	Adult Hasna #1		
2022	The Night of the 12th	Nadia		
2022	Hawawshi	Farida	Short	
2024	The Last Breath	Nurse		
2025	How Are You?	Rabbit (voice)	Short	
2025	The Little Sister	Cassandra		
2025	Colours of Time	Fille Abdelkrim		
2025	The Site	Nour		

=== Television ===
Year	Title	Role	Notes	Ref.
2022	Oussekine	Sarah Oussekine	Miniseries	
2023	Le Horla	Nadia	TV movie	
2023	The Turkish Detective	Omer / Leah	2 episodes	
2025	Cimetière indien	Lidia Achour	8 episodes	

== Awards and nominations ==
Accolades received by Mouna Soualem
Year	Award	Category	Work	Result	Ref.
2022	Series Mania	Révélations Actrice	Oussekine	Nominated	
2022	ACS Awards	Best Actress (shared with Ariane Labed for L'Opéra)	Oussekine	Won	
