= Marc Duret =

French actor (born 1957)

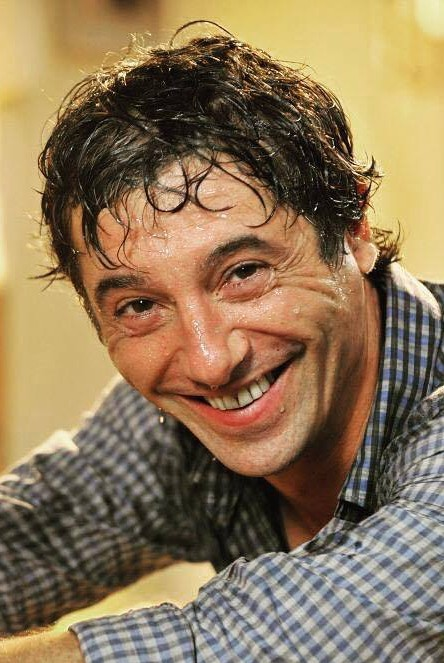
- Duret in 2016
- Born: 28 September 1957 (age 69); Nice, Alpes-Maritimes, France
- Occupation: Actor
- Years active: 1981–present

Marc Duret (born 28 September 1957) is a French actor. He is known for his role as Rico in the 1990 film La Femme Nikita, and as Joseph Duverney in the Starz series Outlander in 2016.

== Early life and education ==
Marc Duret was born in Nice, Alpes-Maritimes, France, on 28 September 1957.

Duret studied drama at the Conservatoire national in Nice, the Conservatoire national supérieur d'art dramatique in Paris, Rose Bruford College in London, and the University at Albany, SUNY and the Stella Adler Conservatory in New York.

== Career ==
Having previously played Cardinal Guillaume Briçonnet in the television series Borgia from 2011 to 2014, Duret appeared as Joseph Duverney in the Starz series Outlander in 2016.

== Awards ==
Duret was nominated for a 1991 César Award for Most Promising Actor for his portrayal of Rico in the 1990 film La Femme Nikita.

In 1994 he was nominated for a Molière Award for Best Newcomer for his theatre performance in Les grandes personnes (The Grown Ups). In 2011, Screen Junkies named Duret #1 of its "10 Best French Movie Actors".

== Filmography ==
=== Film ===
Year	Film	Role	Director	Producer	Notes
1981	Une robe noire pour un tueur (A Black Dress for a Killer)	Young drug addict	José Giovanni	FR3, Selta Films and U.P.C.T.	
1982	Five Days One Summer	French student	Fred Zinneman	Warner Bros.	
1982	Jules et Juju (Jules and Juju)	Stéphane	Yves Ellena		TV movie
1983	Thieves After Dark	Le jeune homme (uncredited)	Samuel Fuller	Parafrance Films and Sara Films	
1988	The Big Blue	Roberto	Luc Besson	Gaumont	
1989	The Man Who Lived at the Ritz	Pierre Monet	Desmond Davis	Harmony Gold	TV movie
1990	La Femme Nikita	Rico	Luc Besson	Gaumont	1991 César Award nominee
1991	L'Homme au masque d'or (The Man in the Golden Mask)	Pedro	Éric Duret	Adélaïde Productions, Société Générale de Gestion Cinématographique (SGGC), Solus Productions and TF1 Films Production	
1993	Tout va bien dans le service	Alain	Charlotte Silvera	France 2 (FR2)	TV movie
1993	Anges ou démons?		Pierre Aknine	Arcanes Films and TF1	TV movie
1993	Faut-il aimer Mathilde?	Mano	Edwin Baily	3B Productions, C.R.R.A.V, Cam Light Grip, Hamster Productions, Paradise Films and Square Productions	
1995	La Haine	Inspector Notre Dame	Mathieu Kassovitz	Canal+	
1995	La voix de l'araignée		Henri Barges	Carl Beyer	
1995	Va mourire (Up Yours)	Yoyo	Nicolas Boukhrief	B.C. Films, Rézo Films and Canal+	
1995	Les grandes personnes	Antoine Boivin	Daniel Moosmann	Borromee Production, France 2 (FR2) and Société Française de Production (SFP)	TV movie
1996	L'embellie	Philippe	Charlotte Silvera	Centre national du cinéma et de l'image animée (CNC), France 2 (FR2) and Néria Productions	TV movie
1996	Cannes Man	French actor	Richard Martini		
1996	The Ogre	Prisoner of War	Volker Schlöndorff	Canal+	
1997	Héroïnes	Luc	Gérard Krawczyk	Alain Terzian	
1997	Dobermann	Inspecteur Baumann	Jan Kounen	PolyGram Filmed Entertainment	
1997	Tortilla y cinema	Benjamin Ballon	Martin Provost	Canal+, Cinesinema and Odessa Films	
1998	Micro climat	Miguel	Marc Simenon	Rafael Rey	TV movie
1999	Les Grandes Bouches (The Loudmouths)	Lucien	Bernie Bonvoisin	Canal+, Clara Films, M6 Films, PolyGram Audiovisuel and S.D.P. Films	
2000	Fugues	Vincent	Marion Sarraut	Stéphane Lhoest	TV movie
2000	Code Unknown	The Policeman	Michael Haneke	Canal+	
2001	The Twins' Plot		Arnaud Sélignac		TV movie
2001	Ties and Ropes	Marcel	Herman Van Eyken	Alice in Wonderland and Fado Filmes	
2002	The Landlords	Michel	Rémi Waterhouse	CASDEN Banque Populaire, Canal+, Cofimage 12, Diaphana Films, M6 Films, Magouric Productions and SGTI	
2003	La maîtresse du corroyeur	Georges Porquel	Claude Grinberg	France 3	TV movie
2003	Corps à corps	Doctor Azzeri	François Hanss	Carrère Groupe	
2003	Une deuxième chance	Louis	Frédéric Krivine	Telfrance, France 3 and Centre national du cinéma et de l'image animée (CNC)	TV movie
2004	Bien agités!	Lieutenant Duret	Patrick Chesnais	M6 Films	TV movie
2005	Virgil	Character in the kitchen	Mabrouk El Mechri	Gaumont	
2006	Mariés... ou presque	Lucas	Didier Grousset	France 2 (FR2) and Merlin Productions	TV movie
2008	Comme les autres	Marc	Vincent Garenq	Canal+	
2010	Ahmed Gassiaux	Bourget	Ismaël Saidi	Ismaël Saidi	
2010	Le 3e jour (The Third Day)	Commissaire Blache	Bernard Stora	Mathieu Fabiani and Bernard Stora	TV movie
2012	Praschan Requiem	Le Juge	Albert Fautré	Don Clovis and Albert Fautré	
2012	Arrête de pleurer Pénélope	Nicolas Badaroux	Juliette Arnaud and Corinne Puget	Thomas Klotz	
2015	L'esigenza di unirmi ogni volta con te (Getaway of Love)	Martino	Tonino Zangardi	Atalante Film, Minerva Pictures and Dea Film	
2016	The Dark Side	Capitaine Soriano	Marc Rivière	A Prime Group, AT-Production and Radio Télévision Belge Francophone (RTBF)	TV movie
2018	Les Tuche 3 (The Magic Tuche)	Laurent Dupuis	Olivier Baroux	Richard Grandpierre	
2020	De l'autre côté (The Other Side)	Didier Coincenot	Didier Bivel	GMT Productions and France Télévisions	TV movie
2022	Envol	Philippot	Frédéric Cerulli	Les Films à Fleur de Peau	

=== Short film ===
Year	Short film	Role	Director	Producer	Notes
1991	La troue de la corneille	Albert	François Hanss		
1994	Le Père-Nöel de minuit	Père Noël	Alain Delmas	Eric Farrant	
1995	L'ennemi	Durun	Hervé Renoh	Baal Films	
1995	Snuff Movie		Olivier Van Hoofstadt	Arizona Films and Ministrie de la Communiate Francaise de Belgique	
1996	Le retour de l'ascenseur	Tom	Hervé Jakubowicz	Jean-Marc Delaplanque and Francis Doré	
1997	Un jour de plus		Olivier Abbou		
1997	Parabellum		Olivier Van Hoofstadt	Seven Productions and Seven Arts Industry	
1998	Bob	Bob	Rémy Boudet	Pumpkins productions	
1998	Mounir et Anita		Mabrouk El Mechri	Mathieu Zeitindjioglou	
2003	R.I.P. - Repose en paix	Meyer	Roland Collin	BR Films, Bull Ring Production and Hobby One Multimédia	
2003	Concours de circonstance		Mabrouk El Mechri		
2004	La chepor	Garagiste station essence	David Tessier	Guyom Corp, Chic Films and MNP Entreprise	
2005	Jack	Meyer	Roland Collin	BR Films and Hobby One Multimédia	
2008	Babylone	Officer n°1	Simon Saulnier	Milo Films	
2008	Beyond the Mexique Bay		Jean-Marc Rousseau Ruiz	Camara Carnal, Instituto Mexicano de Cinematografía (IMCINE) and Parati Films	
2012	À tout prix	Thierry Cortal	Yann Danh	Wallpaper Productions	
2014	13/12/11	Charles Handings	Patrick Alen	ABC Cinema	
2014	L'atente	Marc	Stratos Gabrielidis	Connus Mais Connus and Fondus de Prod	
2016	Silhouette	Alain	Bertrand Cazor	La Terre Tourne	
2017	Elysium Futurus	Serge Bollinger	Roger Simonsz	Michel Discors	
2017	Treasures Under The Rocks	Leilenia's Uncle	Anna Antonova		
2018	Calvin	Marcus	Leslie Crocquefere and Camille Tello		
2021	Lingo	Lawrence	Himself	Himself	Cannes World Film Festival Winner
2023	Bet Your Bottom Dollar	François	Brandon Ashplant	Golden Goat Films	Voice role

=== Television ===
Year	Series	Role	Director	Producer	Notes
1989	Orages d'été (Summer Light)	Maxime	Jean Sagols	TF1 and Telfrance	Episode #1.1-1.8
1990	Le Lyonnais	Marc Lepetit	Michel Favart		Episode: La reine du fleuve
1990	Orages d'été, Avis de tempête	Maxime	Jean Sagols	TF1 and Telfrance	Episode #1.1
1993	Maigret	Agnelot	Michel Sibra	France 2	Episode: Maigret et les témoins récalcitrants
1993-94	Police Secrets	Inspecteur Bizot / Romain	Michèle Ferrand-Lafaye and Janusz Zaorski	Falcon Productions, France 3 Cinéma, Internation Artist Development, La Cinq and Taurus Films	Episodes: Un alibi en or (1994) and Le violeur impuni (1993)
1996	Dalziel and Pascoe	Pierre Ferret	Maurice Phillips	A+E Networks, BBC, Cipango Productions Audiovisuelles, and Portobello Pictures	Episode: An Advancement of Learning
1996	The School Teacher	Marc	François Velle	France 2 (FR2), Hamster Productions, K2 SA, Radio Télévision Belge Francophone (RTBF) and Télévision Suisse-Romande (TSR)	Episode: Demain dès l'aube
1996-98	L'histoire du samedi	Blassans / Romain	Bertrand Van Effenterre and Denys Granier-Deferre	FR3	Episodes: Quand un ange passe and Chassés-croisés
2000	Le lycée	Antoine	Miguel Courtois	M6 and Tétra Média	Six episodes
2000-01	Starhunter	Eric	François Basset and Patrick Malakian	Chum Television, Danforth Studios, Le Sabre and SpaceWorks Studios	Episodes: Dark and Stormy Night and Past Lives
2004	Docteur Dassin, généraliste	Denis Cholet	Stéphane Kurc		Episode: Docteur Dassin, généraliste
2004	Avocats & associés	Marc Cayeux	Patrice Martineau	Alain Clert and Charline de Lépine	Episode: Enfance volée
2004	Cordier and Son: Judge and Cop	Berthier	Gilles Béhat	Michelle Podroznik	Episode: Faux départ
2004	Les Monos	Lino	Dennis Berry	France 2 (FR2), Gaumont Television and Télé Images International	Episodes: Les trois frères and La loi du plus fort
2005	Ladies of the Law	Le docteur Francoeur	Denis Amar		Episode: Héritage
2005	Une femme d'honneur	Didier Marchand / Servat	Patrick Poubel		Episode: Un homme peut en cacher un autre
2006	Le proc	Le commissaire Vecchia	Alexandre Pidoux		Episode: Contrat sur le proc
2006	Jeff et Léo, flics et jumeaux		Olivier Guignard	Alain Degove	Episode: Le dernier tango
2007	The Legend of Three Keys	Simon	Patrick Dewolf	Nelka Films and Fontana	Episode #1.1, #1.2 and #1.3
2009	Action spéciale douanes	François		Exilene Films, A Prime Group and France 2 (FR2)	Six episodes
2009	The Philanthropist	Detective Collin	Duane Clark	Carnival Film & Television, Stillking Films, The Levinson / Fontana Company and Truly Original	Episode: Paris
2009-11	Les toqués	Pierrot		Lady / Boys Films, Fontana and Radio Télévision Belge Francophone (RTBF)	Five episodes
2011-12	Week-end chez les Toquées	Pierrot		Lady / Boys Films, Fontana and Radio Télévision Belge Francophone (RTBF)	Five episodes
2011–14	Borgia	Cardinal Guillaume Briçonnet		Atlantique Productions, EOS Entertainment and Canal+	Seven episodes
2012	Blood of the Vine	Marco Ferri	Marc Rivière	Télécip	Episode: Boire et déboires en Val de Loire
2012	Au nom d'Athènes	Miltiade		Docside Production and Indigenes Productions	
2013	Marc Saint Georges: The Savior	Henri Pessac	Albert Fautré	Golden Century Pictures	Episode: The Shadow of My Enemy
2014	Métal Hurlant Chronicles	King Targot	Guillaume Lubrano	Sparkling and WE Productions	Episode: "Loyal Khondor"
2015	L'homme de la situation	Marc Saint Sabin	Stéphane Kappes	Ego Productions and M6	Episode: Irène
2015	Napoleon: The Campaign of Russia	Napoleon		Indigenes Productions	Episodes: La Moskova and La Bérézina
2015	Caïn	Yann Barbet	Bertrand Arthuys	DEMD Productions	Episode: Rumeurs
2016	Le juge est une femme	Michel Jamin	Akim Isker	Ego Productions, TF1 and Société Française de Production (SFP)	Episode: Mauvais genre
2016	Outlander	Joseph Duverney	Douglas Mackinnon		Episode #2.2, #2.3 and #2.4
2018	Sploon	Leo	Yves Marcellin	Yves Marcellin	Episode: Le pouvoir de l'ubiquité
2020	Ils étaient dix (They Were Ten)	Maitre Langlois	Pascal Laugier		Episode #1.2, #1.3
2024	Franklin	Monsieur Brillon	Tim Van Patten	Apple Studios	Eight episodes

== Theatre ==
Year	Project	Author	Director	Venue	Notes	Ref.
1994	Les grandes personnes	Olivier Dutaillis	Jean-Michel Vanson	Théâtre de Poche Montparnasse	Molière Award nominee	
2004	Wedding (in) white	Roberto Cavosi	Pierre Santini	Mouffetard Theatre, the Theatre Work		
2011	Cyrano de Bergerac	Edmond Rostand	Brigitte Rico Company	Francis Gag Theatre, Theatre de Verdure		
2012	Cyrano de Bergerac	Edmond Rostand	Compagnie three rain ray	Espace Magnan, Nice		
2013	The Seagull	Anton Chekov	Desordre Company		Role: Trigorin	
2014	Angelo, Tyrant of Padua	Victor Hugo	Paulo Correia	Salle Pierre Brasseur, Théâtre National of Nice	Role: Angelo, the Tyrant	
2014	La Strada			Espace Magnan, Nice	Role: Zampanò	

== Recognition ==
Year	Award	Category	Project	Role	Result	Ref.
1991	César Award	Most Promising Actor	La Femme Nikita	Rico	Nominated	
1994	Molière Award	Best Newcomer	Les grandes personnes		Nominated	
2021	Cannes World Film Festival	Best Actor in a Short Film	Lingo	Lawrence	Won	
2022	Next Generation Indie Film Awards	Best Actor in a Short Film	Lingo	Lawrence	Nominated	

In 2011, Screen Junkies named Duret #1 of its "10 Best French Movie Actors".
