= Oussekine =

2022 French drama

- Directed by: Antoine Chevrollier
- Music by: Evgueni Galperine, Sacha Galperine
- Country of origin: France
- Original language: French
- No. of episodes: 4

Production
- Producers: Pierre Laugier; Anthony Lancret

Original release
- Network: Disney+
- Release: May 11, 2022

Oussekine is a French historical drama series directed by Antoine Chevrollier. The series was marketed as the third French Disney+ original production and was released in its entirety on May 11, 2022 on Disney+, consisting of 4 episodes. Set primarily in 1980s Paris, the series follows the events leading up to and following the death of Malik Oussekine.

== Premise ==
Oussekine looks back on the events of December 5, 1986 which led to the death of Malik Oussekine, a young 22-year-old French-Algerian student, by police. The story and the trial are told through the prism of the Oussekine family.

== Cast and characters ==
- Kad Merad as Georges Kiejman
- Sayyid El Alami as Malik Oussekine
- Hiam Abbass as Aïcha Oussekine
- Naidra Ayadi as Fatna Oussekine
- Tewfik Jallab as Mohamed Oussekine
- Malek Lamraoui as Ben Amar Oussekine
- Mouna Soualem as Sarah Oussekine
- Slimane Dazi as Miloud Oussekine
- Thierry Godard as Jean Schmidt
- Laurent Stocker as Bernard Dartevelle
- Olivier Gourmet as Robert Pandraud
- Bastien Bouillon as Yann
- Gilles Cohen as Maître Garaud
- Mario Hacquard as François Mitterrand
- Pascal Elso as Father Desjobert
- Louis Berthélémy as Paul Bayzelon
- Théau Courtès as Agent Pierre

== Release ==
The series launched in France and other international markets on May 11, 2022 on Disney+ as an original series through the Star content hub. In Latin America, Oussekine was released as an original series through Star+. The subtitles were translated from French into English by Ellen Sowchek and Jenn Mercer [Pixelogic].

== Reception ==
=== Critical response ===
According to French entertainment website AlloCiné, the series received widespread praise in French media. Thibaud Gomès-Léal of CNet France described it as "one of the best French series of 2022," praising Antoine Chevrollier's direction and the performances of the actors. Thomas Sotinel of Le Monde described it as "a mirror held up to France, through time," stating it scrupulously explores the circumstances and consequences of the death of Malik Oussekine. Pierre Langlais of Télérama described it as a "perfect example of an educational, moving, well-documented and engaging series of general interest." Olivier Lamm of Libération stated the series unveils the consequences of Malik Oussekine's death and political ramifications, calling the series "excellent, complex and committed." Salammbô Marie of Numérama rated the series 10 out of 10, stated the series manages to tell the story of Malik Oussekine faithfully, called the storytelling "captivating" and "full of empathy," and applauded the performances of the cast.

Dan Einav of Financial Times rated the series 4 out of 5 stars, writing, "The story it tells about brutal, bigoted law enforcement, xenophobia and nativism is, sadly, as timely as ever," and describing it as "[going] for the heart as well as the gut."

=== Accolades ===
List of awards and nominations of Oussekine
Year	Award	Category	Nominee(s)	Result	Ref.
2022	Prix de l’Association française des Critiques de Séries	Best Series	Pierre Laugier, Anthony Lancret, Disney+	Won	
2022	Prix de l’Association française des Critiques de Séries	Best Actress	Mouna Soualem	Won	
2022	Prix de l’Association française des Critiques de Séries	Best Writing	Antoine Chevrollier, Julien Lilti, Cédric Ido, Faïza Guene, Lina Soualem	Won	
2022	Prix de l’Association française des Critiques de Séries	Best Production	Pierre Laugier, Anthony Lancret, Itineraire Productions	Won	
2023	BAFTA TV Awards	Best International Programme	Anthony Lancret, Pierre Laugier, Juliette Lassalle, Antoine Chevrollier, Pauline Dauvin, Kevin Deysson	Nominated	
2023	Venice TV Awards	Best TV Series	Itinéraire Productions (UGC Group), Disney+	Won	
