= Messiah (American TV series) =

2020 American thriller streaming television series

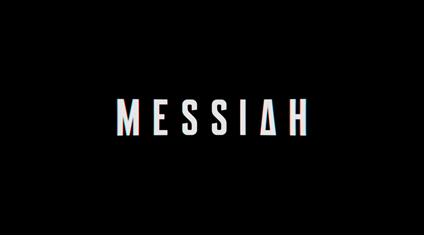
- Genre: Thriller
- Created by: Michael Petroni
- Starring: Mehdi Dehbi; Michelle Monaghan; John Ortiz; Tomer Sisley; Melinda Page Hamilton; Stefania LaVie Owen; Sayyid El Alami; Jane Adams; Wil Traval; Fares Landoulsi; Philip Baker Hall
- Theme music composer: Johnny Klimek; Gabriel Isaac Mounsey
- Country of origin: United States
- Original languages: English; Arabic; Hebrew
- No. of seasons: 1
- No. of episodes: 10

Production
- Executive producers: Michael Petroni; Mark Burnett; Roma Downey; James McTeigue; Andrew Deane
- Producers: Brandon Guercio; David Nicksay
- Cinematography: Danny Ruhlmann
- Editors: Martin Connor; Joseph Jett Sally
- Camera setup: Single-camera
- Running time: 38–55 minutes
- Production companies: Think Pictures Inc.; Industry Entertainment Partners; MGM Television

Original release
- Network: Netflix
- Release: January 1, 2020

Messiah is an American thriller television series created by Michael Petroni. It consists of ten episodes, which were released on Netflix on January 1, 2020. The series stars Mehdi Dehbi, Tomer Sisley, Michelle Monaghan, John Ortiz, Melinda Page Hamilton, Stefania LaVie Owen, Jane Adams, Sayyid El Alami, Fares Landoulsi, and Wil Traval. It was cancelled after one season.

== Premise ==
The series focuses on the modern world's reaction to a man – who first appears in the Middle East – whose followers claim him to be the eschatological return of ʿĪsā (Jesus in Arabic). His sudden appearance and apparent miracles spark a growing international following as a messiah figure in a more generic sense, casting doubts around who he really is, a case investigated by a CIA case officer.

== Cast ==
=== Main ===
- Mehdi Dehbi as al-Masih (Payam Golshiri)
- Tomer Sisley as Aviram Dahan
- Michelle Monaghan as CIA Case Officer Eva Geller
- John Ortiz as Felix Iguero
- Melinda Page Hamilton as Anna Iguero
- Stefania LaVie Owen as Rebecca Iguero
- Jane Adams as Miriam Keneally
- Sayyid El Alami as Jibril Medina
- Fares Landoulsi as Samir
- Wil Traval as Will Mathers
- Michael O'Neill as Cameron Collier, a high level aid to the president

=== Recurring ===
- Philip Baker Hall as Zelman Katz
- Beau Bridges as Edmund DeGuilles
- Hugo Armstrong as Ruben
- Barbara Eve Harris as Katherin
- Nimrod Hochenberg as Israel
- Emily Kinney as Staci Kirmani
- Jackson Hurst as Jonah Kirmani
- Nicole Rose Scimeca as Raeah Kirmani
- Makram Khoury as Mullah Omar
- Ori Pfeffer as Alon
- Rona-Lee Shimon as Mika Dahan
- Kenneth Miller as Larry
- Assaâd Bouab as Qamar Maloof
- Dermot Mulroney as US President John Young

== Episodes ==
No.	Title	Directed by	Written by	Original release date
1	"He That Hath an Ear"	James McTeigue	Michael Petroni	January 1, 2020
A street preacher clad in yellow preaches to a crowd in Damascus, urging them to be calm and not to worry about their city being captured by Islamic State (ISIS), as God has ordained that it will not happen. After a month long sandstorm breaks ISIS's supply chains, they retreat and the city is saved. The preacher, who people take to calling al-Masih, leads hundreds of his followers into the desert, all the way to the border with the Golan Heights, a journey of around 65 kilometres (40 mi). Al-Masih walks over the barbed wire fence and is arrested by the Israel Border Police. Jailed, al-Masih is interrogated by Aviram Dahan, of Israel's Shin Bet internal security agency. Al-Masih turns the tables on Dahan, revealing his name and other facts Dahan feels he could not reasonably be expected to know. Dahan terminates the interrogation and leaves the room. He returns in the early morning hours, but is shocked to find that al-Masih had escaped from detention.
2	"Tremor"	James McTeigue	Michael Petroni & Bruce Marshall Romans	January 1, 2020
With al-Masih having escaped, an international incident is brewing as the people he led to Israel's border starve; when news of his escape reaches them, they receive further resolve to stay. The U.S. Central Intelligence Agency steps in to help the Israeli authorities find al-Masih and figure out who he is, led by Eva Geller. Dahan thinks he sees him, but instead it is just a look-alike. Al-Masih resurfaces at Al-Aqsa (Temple Mount) plaza in Jerusalem. He preaches a sermon to the crowd, including apocalyptic phrases like "history has ended". His sermon is interrupted by the Israeli police, who move to capture al-Masih, but fail to do so after a gun is heard to go off and it seems a boy is shot. Al-Masih lays hands on the boy, who rises unharmed. A bloody bullet is shown to the crowd. Many Muslims view this as a miracle. Al-Masih then disappears into the crowd.
3	"The Finger of God"	James McTeigue	Amy Louise Johnson & Kelly Wiles	January 1, 2020
A tornado hits Dilley, Texas and al-Masih is there, rescuing Rebecca, daughter of town pastor Felix Iguero. A video of this is intercepted by the CIA, who set up a social media blockade. Al-Masih enters the preacher's home as a guest, but soon a federal JTTF agent enters the church and arrests him. Iguero vows to get al-Masih out of jail, and calls in a favor to get an ACLU lawyer on the case. Geller arrives in Texas to interrogate al-Masih, learning on the way that he might have arrived via Mexico's Quetzalcóatl International Airport, on a charter plane flying from Jordan. She demands that the JTTF allow her to speak to the detained al-Masih, but al-Masih's lawyer prevents that from happening. Her situation worsens when one of the videos proving al-Masih is in Texas escapes their social media blockade and is picked up by the news media.
4	"Trial"	James McTeigue	Michael Brandon Guercio	January 1, 2020
Al-Masih's lawyer tells him that while the charge of illegal entry into the United States is likely to be upheld in court, she thinks she can get him out of the federal immigration detention facility he is being held in. She then leaves the facility, and the JTTF tips off Geller, who despite having just had a miscarriage, rushes in to see him. Once again, al-Masih turns the tables on his interrogator by revealing he knows her name, and that both her mother and husband are deceased. In her hotel room, Geller has a call with her boss, who reveals that Israel is seeking to extradite al-Masih, and that the State's attorney will argue that this be allowed. Geller goes to see al-Masih's lawyer, trying to convince her to stop fighting al-Masih's detention, to keep him out of Israel. At the trial, the State argues that al-Masih's lawyer is lying about him being a Muslim, to which al-Masih replies that he "walks with all men". In a shock decision the next day, the Court decides to grant "Mr. Masih" asylum, which permits al-Masih to walk out of the court room a free man into a waiting car driven by Iguero.
5	"So That Seeing They May Not See"	Kate Woods	Emily Silver	January 1, 2020
In the Golan Heights, a badly injured Jibril is cared for by Samir, his friend and fellow al-Masih acolyte. The refugees are faring badly, and Samir questions why Jibril has so much faith, calling him "mad" for not seeking medical care as his injuries could kill him. The CIA follows al-Masih and Iguero back to Dilley, where Americans from all over begin congregating to be close to al-Masih. Al-Masih stays in a small tent, attended only by Iguero. The only guidance al-Masih gives Iguero is that he needs to listen to God. Dahan travels to Dilley to kill al-Masih, but cannot bring himself to pull the trigger when face to face with him; he is caught in the act on camera by Geller, who races after him. Al-Masih follows the sound of a wounded dog crying out. The dog's owner prepares to shoot it, but his son begs al-Masih for a miracle. Al-Masih takes the gun and shoots the dog, to the exasperation of the child. Geller, startled at the gun shot, finally catches up with Dahan, and is bewildered to see both Dahan and al-Masih still alive. She demands he tell her what happened, but he does not.
6	"We Will Not All Sleep"	Kate Woods	Michael Petroni & Michael Bond	January 1, 2020
Al-Masih wakes Iguero, telling him that it is time for them to go, demanding he chose the destination. A conflicted Iguero decides to uproot his family, much to the chagrin of his wife, Anna, though to the delight of Rebecca. Iguero leads a convoy out of Dilley, which soon grows to hundreds of cars. Geller finally learns al-Masih's real name from a mysterious source named "Q": Payam Golshiri. She heads back to Texas to follow al-Masih, who the media incorrectly report is leading the convoy. She theorizes that al-Masih's plan is to cause "social disruption" because, during an interrogation, he quoted a book by one of his professors, an American who defected to Russia. Al-Masih goes to Washington D.C., preaches a sermon in front of the Lincoln Memorial Reflecting Pool, then turns and walks on the water; many in the crowd record the event on their phones. At the same time as al-Masih walks on water, in the Golan Heights, Jibril, who had been experiencing vivid visions of his deceased mother and al-Masih, strips nude and walks up to and then over the Israeli border, leading the other refugees – an event likewise widely photographed.
7	"It Came to Pass as It Was Spoken"	Kate Woods	Eoghan O'Donnell	January 1, 2020
The world is abuzz after al-Masih's miracle, with even the Congregation for the Causes of Saints investigating. Samir, along with many others who defected from the teachings of al-Masih, end up in a compound in the Badia Desert led by a man who thinks al-Masih is al-Masih ad-Dajjal. Jibril, remaining faithful to al-Masih, ends up in Ramallah, greeted as a liberator. The highest levels of the U.S. government are concerned over the popularity of al-Masih, with the White House Chief of Staff demanding the CIA do more to "discredit" him. A prostitute is sent to seduce al-Masih at his hotel, but he recognizes her as having been paid to discredit him. The CIA manages to find al-Masih's brother, who tells them that they were raised by their uncle, a trained illusionist.
8	"Force Majeure"	Kate Woods	Eoghan O'Donnell	January 1, 2020
The President of the United States has a secret meeting with al-Masih, who demands the withdrawal of all US troops from everywhere in the world, using the President's Mormon faith in a bid to convince him. The next day, al-Masih reveals to the media that the meeting took place, to the anger of Iguero, who was not informed beforehand. Rebecca reveals to Iguero that her mother, Anna, took her to Austin, Texas for an abortion. She also reveals that al-Masih came to Texas for her, not him. Later, al-Masih tries to convince Anna to let "her [Rebecca] go" to be "her own person". In Jerusalem, a guard admits to having freed al-Masih from prison, ending the investigation into Dahan.
9	"God Is Greater"	James McTeigue	Bruce Marshall Romans	January 1, 2020
In Ramallah, Jibril is being taught to memorize a speech promoting the Palestinian cause. When Iguero convinces televangelist Edmund DeGuilles to have al-Masih on his program, al-Masih agrees, but only if Iguero will bring along Rebecca. Geller is shocked that her father believes al-Masih to be the end times Messiah; he also compares her to her own mother who persevered through many miscarriages. Angry, Geller reveals that she miscarried the final egg fertilized via in-vitro fertilization from her deceased husband. She goes to the hotel and has sex with Dahan, who had previously made his desire for her obvious. It is revealed that the compound in the Badia is a terrorist training camp, and that Samir will be a suicide bomber. While Jibril gives his speech, Samir enters the mosque, shows the explosives tied to his chest, and raises the button. Staring into Jibril's eyes, Samir cannot bring himself to pull the trigger, however the bomb vest is remotely activated by Samir's mentor. Back in the good graces of the Mossad, Dahan abducts al-Masih before he can appear on TV ([in a manner similar to the real life Mossad abduction of Mordechai Vanunu]), and they drive to an airport.
10	"The Wages of Sin"	James McTeigue	Michael Petroni	January 1, 2020
The White House Chief of Staff leaks al-Masih's real name to the press, and that al-Masih was brought up by an illusionist, causing dismay among al-Masih's followers. Geller finds out that Dahan has abducted al-Masih, despite his having been granted asylum. The CIA tracks the "diplomatic jet" as it flies back to the Middle East. Al-Masih talks to Dahan, telling him that God loves him, that every moment is an opportunity for choosing good or evil, and that the last thing Dahan will see before he dies will be the face of a boy he killed in Megiddo. One of the plane's engines explodes; a fearful Dahan looks into the eyes of al-Masih, who seems not at all concerned. The plane crashes south of Algeria's Ksour Range while Geller is tracking it. Geller confronts the Chief of Staff for leaking classified information and for orchestrating the crash. A school-aged shepherd comes across the desert crash site, mystically surrounded by a field of poppies. He tells Dahan that he and a second passenger were dead, but he witnessed al-Masih touch them and they both came back to life. A shocked Dahan sees the other resurrected passenger on his knees, kissing al-Masih's hand.

== Production ==
=== Development ===
On November 17, 2017, it was announced that Netflix had given the production a series order for a first season consisting of ten episodes. The series was created by Michael Petroni who is also credited as an executive producer and showrunner of the series. Additional executive producers include Andrew Deane, James McTeigue, Mark Burnett and Roma Downey. Production companies involved with the series include Industry Entertainment and LightWorkers Media. On March 26, 2020, Netflix canceled the series after one season.

=== Casting ===
In January 2018, it was announced that John Ortiz, Tomer Sisley and Mehdi Dehbi would star in the series. In May 2018, it was announced that Michelle Monaghan had been cast in a starring role. In June 2018, it was reported that Melinda Page Hamilton, Stefania LaVie Owen, Jane Adams, Sayyid El Alami, Fares Landoulsi and Wil Traval had joined the main cast. In the same month, it was announced that Beau Bridges and Philip Baker Hall had joined the cast in a recurring capacity. This was Hall’s final credit, prior to his death in 2022.

=== Filming ===
Principal photography for the first season took place in Amman, Jordan; Albuquerque, Mountainair, Estancia, Belen, Santa Fe and Clines Corners, New Mexico, from June 2018 to August 2018.

== Release ==
=== Marketing ===
On December 3, 2019, the official trailer for the series was released by Netflix.

== Reception ==
The review aggregator website Rotten Tomatoes reported a 45% approval rating from critics for the first season, based on 29 reviews. Audiences gave the first season an approval rating of 88%. The website's critical consensus states, "A promising premise and superb ensemble can't save Messiah from its own bland storytelling." On Metacritic, the season has a weighted average score of 46 out of 100, based on eight critics, indicating "mixed or average reviews".

The trailer received negative reception from some Muslim audiences. In December 2019, it was announced in a press conference that The Royal Film Commission of Jordan requested Netflix to refrain from streaming Messiah in the country due to the provocative subject matter and controversial religious content covered in the series.
