= Hiam Abbass =

Palestinian actress with Israeli and French citizenship (born 1960)

- هيام عباس
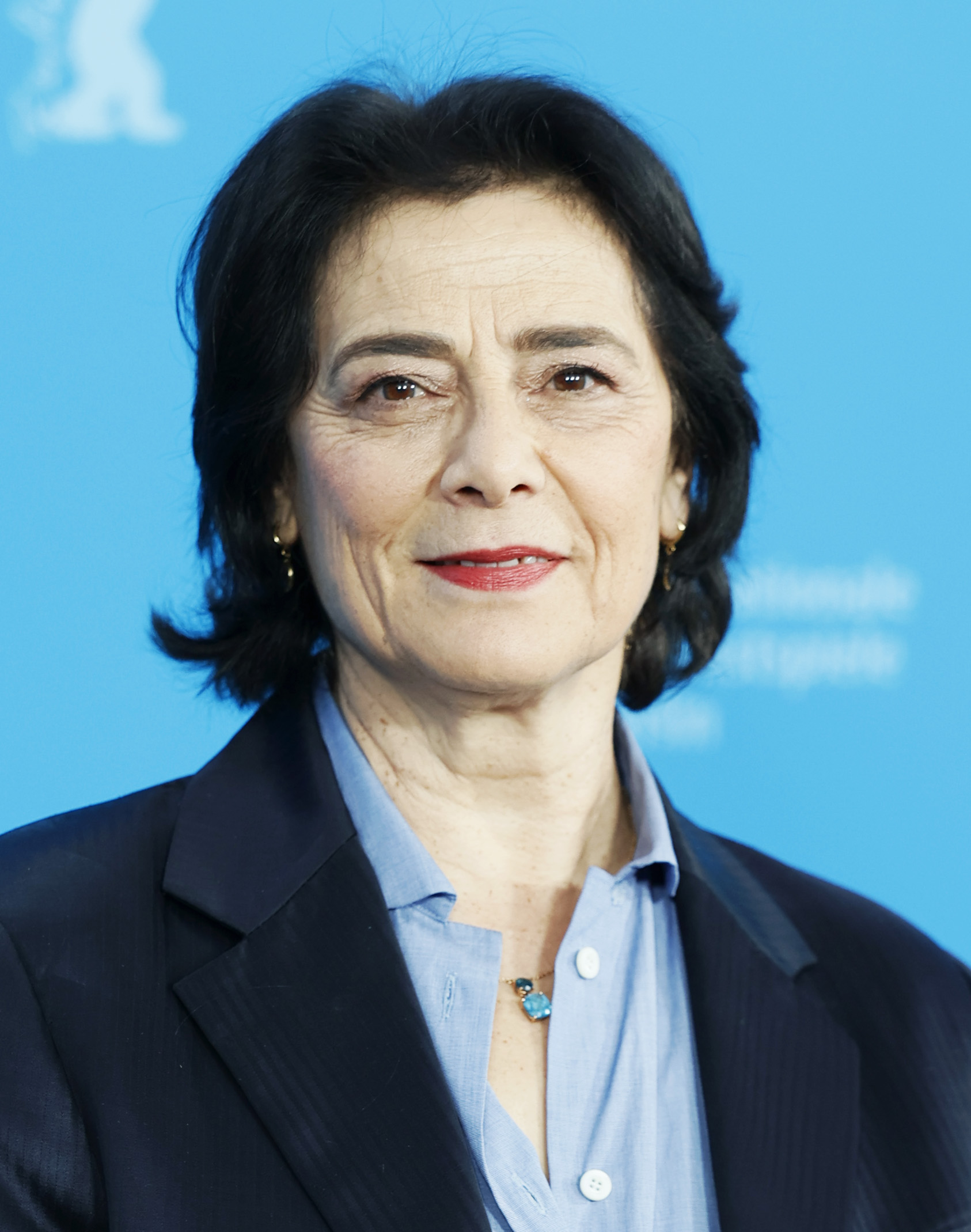
- Abbass in 2026
- Born: 30 November 1960 (age 65); Nazareth, Israel
- Citizenship: Palestine; France
- Occupations: Actress; film director
- Years active: 1989–present
- Spouse: Zinedine Soualem (divorced)
- Children: Lina Soualem; Mouna Soualem

Hiam Abbass (Arabic: هيام عباس; born 30 November 1960), also spelled Hiyam Abbas, is a Palestinian actress and film director with French citizenship. She is known for her roles in films such as The Syrian Bride (2004), Paradise Now (2005), Free Zone (2005), Munich (2005), The Visitor (2007), Lemon Tree (2008), Insyriated (2017), and Blade Runner 2049 (2017). She gained prominence for her role as Marcia Roy in the HBO drama series Succession (2018–2023) for which she was nominated for a Primetime Emmy Award for Outstanding Guest Actress in a Drama Series. She has also acted in the Channel 4 series The Promise (2011), the Lifetime miniseries The Red Tent (2014), the Hulu comedy series Ramy (2019–2022), and the Hulu drama series The Old Man (2022).

== Early and personal life ==
Abbass was born in Nazareth on 30 November 1960 to a Palestinian family. She was raised in the village of Deir Hanna. Since the late 1980s, she has lived in Paris, France, and holds French citizenship.

During the filming of the Steven Spielberg film Munich (2005), Abbass lived in a hotel with Israeli and Palestinian actors for three months. During that time, they had many discussions that "helped both sides grow closer". In an interview in 2006, Abbass said, "I still remember how difficult it was for the Arab actors to manhandle the Israeli actors in the first scene where the Israeli national team is taken hostage."

== Career ==
Abbass is known for her roles in Red Satin (2002), Haifa (1996), Paradise Now (2005), The Syrian Bride (2004), Free Zone (2005), Dawn of the World (2008), The Visitor (2008), Lemon Tree (2008), Every Day Is a Holiday (2009), and Amreeka (2009). She appeared in Spielberg's film Munich, depicting the response to the Munich massacre, and also served as a dialect and acting consultant.

She directed two short films, Le Pain (2001), and La Danse éternelle (2004). She portrays humanitarian Hind al-Husseini in Julian Schnabel's film Miral (2010), based on the life of Husseini and her orphanage.

In 2002, she appeared in Satin Rouge by Raja Amari, a film about the self-discovery of a middle aged Tunisian widow. She also a similar role in The Syrian Bride, about a Druze woman eager to break down barriers. Abbass appeared in the French films Le sac de farine and Le temps de la balle. In 2008, she played the mother of an illegal Syrian immigrant in Tom McCarthy's movie The Visitor, and the mother of an Iraqi soldier in Abbas Fahdel's film Dawn of the World. In the same year she could be seen in Pomegranates and Myrrh as Umm Habib, the owner of a beleaguered café.

Also in 2008, she played the principal role in Israeli director Eran Riklis's film Lemon Tree (Etz Limon in Hebrew language). For this role, she won Best Performance by an Actress at the 2008 Asia Pacific Screen Awards. In Jim Jarmusch's 2009 film The Limits of Control, in the role of Driver, she recites in Classical Arabic one of the film's leitmotif-phrases, "He who thinks he is bigger than the rest must go to the cemetery. There he will see what life really is."

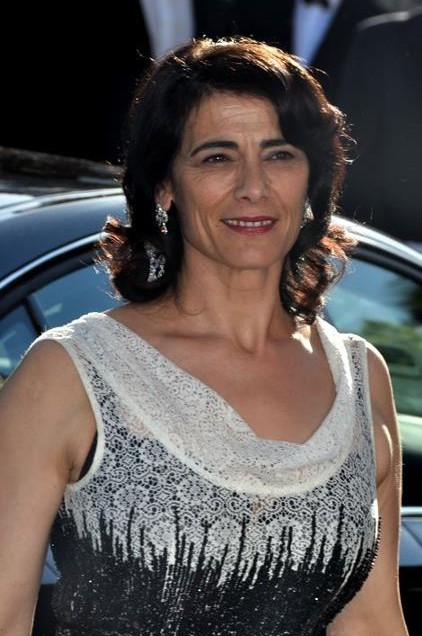
Abbass at the 2012 Cannes Film Festival

Abbass also appears in A Bottle in the Gaza Sea (2011), a French-Israeli film produced by Thierry Binisti. It is based upon the young adult novel Une bouteille dans la mer de Gaza by Valérie Zenatti. She plays the role of Naïm's mother. In 2012, she was named as a member of the Jury for the Main Competition at the 2012 Cannes Film Festival. She made her directorial feature film debut with The Inheritance in 2012. In 2017, she played Freysa, the head of the replicant freedom movement, in Blade Runner 2049. Abbass has also acted in TV shows such as The Promise (2011), The State (2017), Succession (2018–2023), and Ramy (2019–2022).

In 2023, Abbass starred in the documentary film Bye Bye Tiberias which follows her decision to pursue her dream of becoming actress, directed by her daughter, Lina Soualem. It premiered at the 80th Venice International Film Festival and screened at the 2023 Toronto International Film Festival in September 2023.

== Filmography ==
=== As actor ===
==== Film ====
Year	Title	Role	Notes	Ref.
1996	When the Cat's Away	Woman in the courtyard		
1996	Haifa	Oum Said		
1998	Raddem		Short	
1998	Vivre au paradis			
1998	Histoire naturelle		Short	
2000	Ali, Rabiaa et les autres	Rabiaa		
2001	Ligne 208	Khaled's Mother		
2001	Le pain		Short	
2001	Le mariage en papier	Aunt Rabiaa	Short	
2001	Tar Angel (L'ange de goudron)	Naïma Kasmi		
2002	Fais-moi des vacances	Lucien & José's Mother		
2002	Red Satin	Lilia		
2002	A Loving Father	Salma		
2003	Noctambules	Lonely Woman	Short	
2004	The Gate of Sun	Um Youness		
2004	The Syrian Bride	Amal		
2004	Nadia et Sarra	Nadia		
2005	Paradise Now	Said's Mother		
2005	Sur les traces de Mélanie	Madelaine	Short	
2005	Free Zone	Leila		
2005	The Demon Stirs	Rim		
2005	Munich	Marie Claude Hamshari	Also consultant and dialog coach	
2006	Petites révélations			
2006	Azur & Asmar: The Princes' Quest	Jénane	Voice, original French dub	
2006	The Nativity Story	Anna		
2007	Conversations with My Gardener	The gardener's wife		
2007	Disengagement	Hiam		
2007	The Visitor	Mouna		
2008	La fabrique des sentiments	Professor Sterne		
2008	Lemon Tree	Salma Zidane		
2008	Un roman policier	Fati		
2008	Dawn of the World	Mastour's mother		
2008	Fatoush	The woman	Short	
2008	Kandisha	Mona Bendrissi		
2008	Pomegranates and Myrrh	Umm Habib		
2008	Blanche	The neighbour	Short	
2009	Amreeka	Raghda Halaby		
2009	Espion(s)	Wafa		
2009	Human Zoo	Mina		
2009	The Limits of Control	The Driver		
2009	Persécution	Marie		
2009	Chaque jour est une fête	Hala		
2010	Suite parlée	The Ants		
2010	Clichés		Short	
2010	Miral	Hind al-Husseini		
2010	Le temps de la balle	Hana	Short	
2010	Habibti	Iman	Short	
2011	The Source	Fatima		
2011	Do Not Forget Me Istanbul			
2011	A Bottle in the Gaza Sea	Intessar		
2012	Le sac de farine	Yasmine		
2012	Inheritance	Samira		
2013	Les jeux des nuages et de la pluie	Blanche		
2013	May in the Summer	Nadine		
2013	Rock the Casbah	Aicha		
2013	Samarkande	The Death	Short	
2013	Peace After Marriage	Amani		
2014	De guerre lasse	Raïssa		
2014	Nothing Escapes My Eyes	Women	Short	
2014	Exodus: Gods and Kings	Bithiah		
2015	Dégradé	Eftikhar		
2015	The Sense of Wonder	Dr. Mélanie Ferenza		
2017	Blade Runner 2049	Freysa		
2017	Insyriated	Oum Yazan		
2020	Gaza mon amour	Siham		
2022	Hellraiser	Serena Menaker		
2023	Insidious: The Red Door	Professor Armagan		
2023	Bye Bye Tiberias	Herself	Documentary	
2024	Last Breath	Mme Broquet		
2025	No Beast. So Fierce.	Mishal		
2025	Palestine 36	Hanan		
2026	Only Rebels Win	Susan		
2026	In a Whisper	Wahida		
2026	Atonement			

==== Television ====
Year	Title	Role	Notes	Ref.
1989	La nuit miraculeuse		Television movie	
1993	Antoine Rives, juge du terrorisme	Jacqueline Tabet	Episode: "L'affaire JBN"	
1994	3000 scénarios contre un virus	A client	Episode: "Poisson rouge"	
1998	Venise est une femme	Aïcha's Mother	Television movie	
2000	Mix-cité		Television movie	
2003	Pierre et Farid	Farid's Mother	Television movie	
2008	Béthune sur Nil	Farah	Television movie	
2010	Histoires de vies	Zineb	Episode: "Des intégrations ordinaires"	
2010	I Am Slave	Laila	Television movie	
2011	The Promise	Old Jawda	4 episodes	
2014	The Red Tent	Queen Re-Nefer	Miniseries	
2016	The OA	Khatun	Episodes: "Homecoming" and "Away"	
2017	The State	Umm Salamah	4 episodes	
2018–2023	Succession	Marcia Roy	23 episodes	
2019–2022	Ramy	Maysa Hassan	22 episodes	
2022	Oussekine	Aïcha Oussekine	4 episodes	
2022	The Old Man	Abbey Chase	5 episodes	

=== As director ===
Year	Title	Notes	Ref.
2001	Le pain	Short film	
2004	La danse éternelle	Short film; also writer	
2012	Inheritance	Also writer	
2013	Le Donne della Vucciria	Short film; also co-writer	
2015	Jerusalem, I Love You		

== Awards and nominations ==
Year	Association	Category	Project	Result	Ref.
2004	Ophir Award	Best Actress	The Syrian Bride	Nominated	
2005	Ophir Award	Best Supporting Actress	Free Zone	Nominated	
2005	European Film Awards	People's Choice Award	Syrian Bride	Nominated	
2008	European Film Awards	Best Actress	Lemon Tree	Nominated	
2008	Boston Society of Film Critics	Best Ensemble	The Visitor	Nominated	
2008	Gotham Awards	Best Ensemble Cast	The Visitor	Nominated	
2016	Lumière Awards	Best Actress	Insyriated	Nominated	
2023	Primetime Emmy Awards	Outstanding Guest Actress in a Drama Series	Succession	Nominated	

== See also ==
- List of Arab citizens of Israel
