= Red Satin =

2002 Tunisian drama film

- Directed by: Raja Amari
- Screenplay by: Raja Amari
- Starring: Hiam Abbas; Hend El Fahem; Zinedine Soualem
- Cinematography: Diane Baratier
- Edited by: Pauline Dairou
- Production company: Zeitgeist Films
- Release dates: 24 April 2002 (Tunisia and France)
- Running time: 100 minutes
- Countries: Tunisia; France
- Language: Arabic

Red Satin also known as Satin Rouge (French: Satin rouge) is a 2002 Tunisian Arabic-language women oriented drama film written and directed by Raja Amari on her feature film directorial debut. The film stars Palestinian actress Hiam Abbass and Hend El Fahem in the lead roles. It reveals the story of a widow woman who radically transforms from a housewife to a seductive cabaret dancer. The film had its theatrical release on 24 April 2002 and opened to mixed reviews. The film received several awards and nominations at International Film Festivals.

== Cast ==
- Hiam Abbass as Lilia
- Hend El Fahem as Salma
- Zinedine Soualem as Caberet Patron
- Selma Kouchy
- Faouzia Badr as Lilia's neighbour
- Nadra Lamloum as Hela
- Maher Kamoun as Chokri
- Monia Hichri as Folla

== Synopsis ==
After the death of her husband, the widow Lilia's (Hiam Abbass) life revolves solely around her teenage daughter Salma (Hend El Fahem). Whilst looking for Salma late one night, Lilia's transformation begins when she becomes suspicious of her teenage daughter engaging in a secret relationship with Chokri (Maher Kamoun), a darbouka drummer in Salma's dance class. To find out more, Lilia decides to follow Chokri one day. On her escapade, she follows him into his second workplace, a cabaret club. After overcoming her initial shock, Lilia becomes drawn towards the dancers and drum music. The women are very different from Lilia as they wear colourful clothing, show their midriffs, and dance sensually to the drumbeat. After befriending the lead dancer, Folla (Monia Hichri), Lilia is convinced to start dancing in the cabaret club. While Lilia begins dancing nightly, she simultaneously begins a romantic relationship with Chokri, who is still unaware that Lilia is Salma's mother. When Chokri ends his affair with Lilia, she is heartbroken. She later finds out it is because Salma has asked Chokri to meet her and Chokri, realizing his relationship with Salma is getting serious.

== Awards and nominations ==
Year	Festival	Category	Result
2002	Seattle International Film Festival	New Director's Showcase Award	Won
2002	Montreal World Film Festival	Best African Film Award	Won
2002	Maine International Film Festival	Audience Award	Won
2002	Torino Film Festival	Best Feature Film Award	Won
2002	Torino Film Festival	Special Mention for William Holden Screenplay Award	Won
