= The Site (film) =

2025 drama film

- French: Grand Ciel
- Directed by: Akihiro Hata
- Written by: Akihiro Hata; Jérémie Dubois; Camille Lugan
- Produced by: Clément Duboin; Gilles Chanial
- Starring: Damien Bonnard; Samir Guesmi; Mouna Soualem
- Cinematography: David Chizallet
- Edited by: Suzana Pedro
- Music by: Carla Pallone
- Production companies: Good Fortune Films; Les Films Fauves
- Release date: 5 September 2025 (Venice)
- Running time: 91 minutes
- Countries: France; Luxemburg
- Language: French

The Site (French: Grand Ciel) is a 2025 thriller film co-written and directed by Akihiro Hata, in his feature film debut.

A co-production between France and Luxemburg, the film had its world premiere at the Orizzonti section of the 82nd Venice International Film Festival.

== Cast ==
- Damien Bonnard as Vincent
- Samir Guesmi as Saïd
- Mouna Soualem as Nour
- Tudor Aaron Istodor as Mihai
- Ahmed Abdel Laoui as Ahmed
- Issaka Sawadogo as Ousmane
- Sophie Mousel as Delphine
- Denis Eyriey as Marc
- Mounir Margoum as Farid

== Production ==
Akihiro Hata first presented a rough version of the script during a workshop at the 2020 Ateliers d’Angers Festival. A more developed version of the screenplay was later presented at the 2023 Ateliers d’Angers, where it won the Audience Grand Prix.

The film was produced by Good Fortune Films and Les Films Fauves. It was mostly shot at Filmland studios in Kehlen, Luxemburg.

== Release ==
The film had its world premiere at the 82nd edition of the Venice Film Festival, in the Orizzonti sidebar. After having its national premiere at the Arras Film Festival, it was released in French cinemas on 21 January 2026.

== Reception ==
Cineuropa's film critic Veronica Orciari referred to The Site as "a film that does its best to run, but instead tends to limp along here and there. All of the component parts are above-par in terms of their quality, but at times, the movie's technical precision seems to outweigh its emotional depth, creating a small, yet noticeable, discrepancy". Marc van de Klashorst from International Cinephile Society complained about the film's final, but noted that the film " has a lot to offer before that fateful final chapter" and wrote "despite Hata tripping up on the denouement, this is a promising first feature that could have used a bit more ambiguity, but shows a talent at the helm". Michaël Mélinard from L'Humanité described it as "a striking blend of Human Resources (1999) by Laurent Cantet and Alien (1979) by Ridley Scott, combining social realism and the fantastic, intimacy and class struggle, in a film with a breathtaking soundscape".
