= Bye Bye Tiberias =

2023 documentary film by Lina Soualem

- International release poster
- Arabic: باي باي طبريا
- Directed by: Lina Soualem
- Written by: Lina Soualem; Nadine Naous; Gladys Joujou (collaboration)
- Produced by: Jean-Marie Nizan
- Starring: Hiam Abbass
- Cinematography: Lina Soualem; Frida Marzouk; Thomas Brémond
- Edited by: Gladys Joujou
- Music by: Amine Bouhafa
- Production companies: Beall Productions; Altitude100 Productions; Philistine Films; Arte; Doha Film Institute; Arab Fund for Arts and Culture; CNC; International Media Support
- Distributed by: JHR Films
- Release dates: 3 September 2023 (Venice); 21 February 2024 (France)
- Running time: 82 minutes
- Countries: France; Belgium; Palestine; Qatar
- Languages: French; Arabic

Bye Bye Tiberias (Arabic: باي باي طبريا, romanized: Bāy Bāy Ṭabariyya) is a 2023 documentary film directed by Lina Soualem, written by Soualem and Nadine Naous, in collaboration with Gladys Joujou. It follows Hiam Abbass, who leaves her Palestinian village of Deir Hanna in the Lower Galilee, Israel, to pursue her dream of becoming an actress, leaving behind her mother, grandmother, and sisters. Abbass returns to her village, with her daughter, Lina, to explore her mother's choices and family influence. It is a co-production between Palestine, Belgium, France and Qatar.

It had its world premiere at the 80th Venice International Film Festival in the Giornate degli Autori section on 3 September 2023, and is scheduled to be released in France on 21 February 2024.

== Premise ==
Hiam Abbass leaves her native Palestinian village of Deir Hanna in the Lower Galilee, Israel, to pursue her dream of becoming an actress, leaving behind her mother, grandmother, and sisters. Abbass returns to her village, with her daughter, Lina Soualem, to explore her mother's choices and family influence.

== Production ==
In October 2020, it was announced Lina Soualem would direct a documentary revolving around her mother, Hiam Abbass, with the film receiving grants from Arte, Doha Film Institute and Arab Fund for Arts and Culture.

== Release ==
The film had its world premiere at the 80th Venice International Film Festival in the Giornate degli Autori section on September 3, 2023. It also screened at the 2023 Toronto International Film Festival on 11 September 2023. It screened at the 2023 BFI London Film Festival on 7 October 2023, where it received the Grierson Award for Best Documentary. In December 2023, Women Make Movies acquired U.S. distribution rights to the film.

== Reception ==
=== Critical reception ===
On the review aggregator website Rotten Tomatoes, 100% of 25 critics' reviews are positive, with an average rating of 7.9/10.

=== Awards and nominations ===
It was selected as the Palestinian entry for the Best International Feature for the 96th Academy Awards, but did not make the short list. It has been nominated for Best Documentary at the 39th Independent Spirit Awards.

At the 2024 DOXA Documentary Film Festival, it was the winner of the international DOXA Feature Documentary Award.
