= Block Pass =

2024 French film by Antoine Chevrollier

- French: La Pampa
- Directed by: Antoine Chevrollier
- Written by: Antoine Chevrollier; Bérénice Bocquillon; Faïza Guène
- Produced by: Nicolas Blanc
- Starring: Amaury Foucher; Sayyid El Alami; Damien Bonnard
- Cinematography: Benjamin Roux
- Edited by: Lilian Corbeille
- Music by: Evgueni Galperine; Sacha Galperine
- Production company: Agat Films
- Distributed by: Tandem
- Release date: 20 May 2024 (Cannes)
- Running time: 104 minutes
- Country: France
- Language: French

Block Pass (French: La Pampa) is a 2024 French drama film, directed by Antoine Chevrollier in his feature directorial debut. The film stars Amaury Foucher as Jojo, a teenager living in Longué-Jumelles who is training as a motocross racer, and Sayyid El Alami as Willy, his longtime best friend whose support and loyalty prove critical to Jojo's survival after he is outed to the community as gay. The cast also includes Damien Bonnard as Jojo's father David, as well as Mathieu Demy, Léonie Dahan-Lamort, Florence Janas, Artus Solaro and Axelle Fresneau in supporting roles.

The film was shot principally in and around Longué-Jumelles, Chevrollier's real-life hometown. The film premiered on 20 May 2024 in the Critics Week program at the 2024 Cannes Film Festival, where it was nominated for the Queer Palm.

== Plot ==
The film follows inseparable friends Willy and Jojo, who spend their days training at La Pampa Motocross Park. As time passes, Willy uncovers a secret that Jojo has been hiding. The revelation involves the coach of the La Pampa team, which competes under the direction of Willy's father, David, setting in motion the film's central conflict.

Willy also discovers details about Jojo's secret love life, triggering a wave of homophobia within their community. As tensions rise, he is forced to confront difficult choices and take a stand amid the sport's deeply rooted culture of masculinity.

== Critical reception ==
The film was well received by critics, holding an 88% approval rating on Rotten Tomatoes based on eight compiled reviews. Reviewing the film for Flipscreen, Rebecca Rosén described it as "a vigorous portrait of male friendship and the pains of growing up... an immersive coming-of-age tale that encapsulates the vast intricacies that coincide with living in a small town and the unbearable pain of being rejected by the world."

Amber Wilkinson of Eye for Film described the film as an exploration of the choices people face, whether to remain trapped in familiar patterns or forge their own path. She characterized it as a reflection on deciding "whether to get stuck in that rut or speed off on your own racing line."

== Cast ==
- Sayyid El Alami as Willy
- Florence Janas as Séverine
- Mathieu Demy as Étienne
- Axelle Fresneau as Mélody
- Amaury Foucher as Jojo
- Damien Bonnard as David
- Crystal Shepherd-Cross as Steph
- Artus as Teddy
- Léonie Dahan-Lamort as Marina
- Laëtitia Clément as Olivia

== Production and release ==
The film was shot principally in and around Longué-Jumelles, Antoine Chevrollier's real-life hometown.

The film premiered on 20 May 2024 in the Critics Week program at the 2024 Cannes Film Festival, where it was a nominee for the Queer Palm, an independently sponsored prize for selected LGBTQ+ films entered into the Cannes Film Festival.
