= Foreign Body (2016 film) =

2016 Tunisian drama film

- Directed by: Raja Amari
- Starring: Hiam Abbass; Sarra Hannachi
- Release dates: 8 September 2016 (Toronto International Film Festival); 22 February 2017
- Running time: 92 minutes
- Country: Tunisia

Foreign Body is a 2016 Tunisian drama film directed and written by Raja Amari.

== Plot ==
A young lady escaped from her home in Tunisia and illegally migrated to France. She finds joy and struggles in her journey.

== Cast ==
- Hiam Abbass
- Sarra Hannachi
- Salim Kechiouche
- Marc Brunet
- Majd Mastoura
