= Lina Soualem =

French filmmaker, journalist, and actress

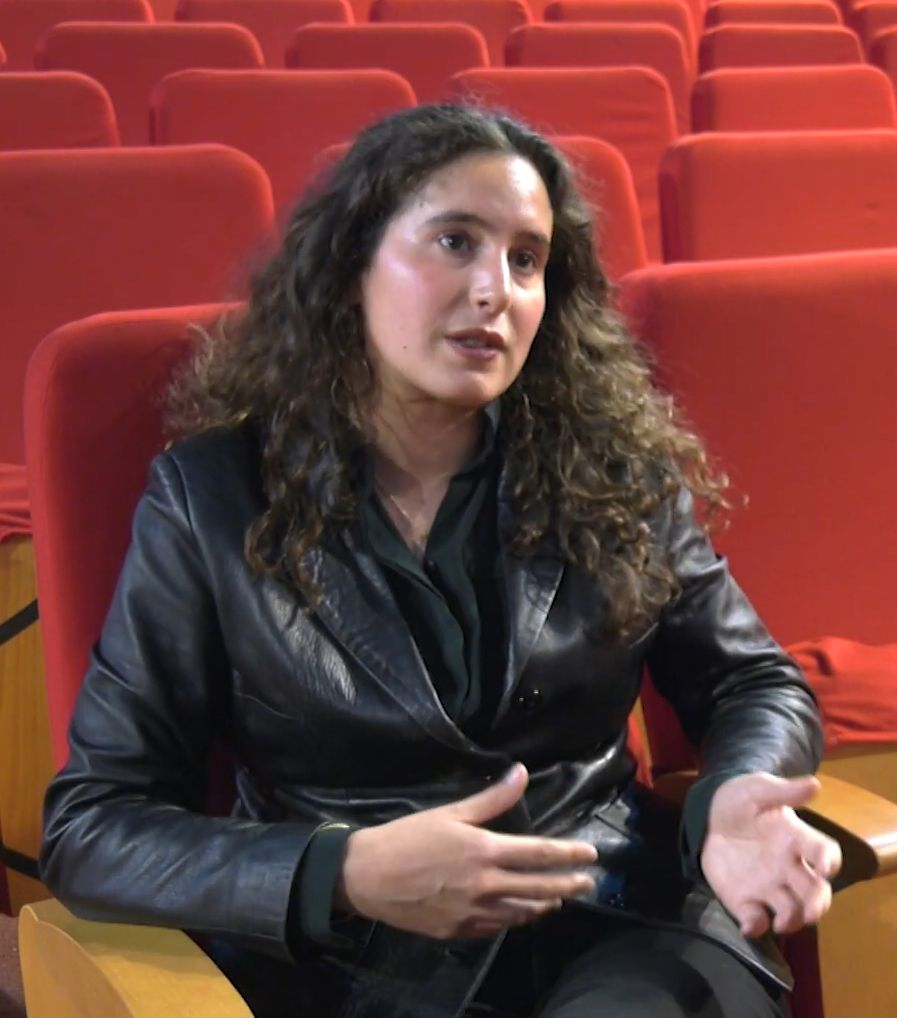
- Born: Paris, France
- Years active: 2012–present
- Parents: Zinedine Soualem (father); Hiam Abbas (mother)
- Family: Mouna Soualem (sister)

Lina Soualem is a French filmmaker, journalist, and actress.

== Early life and education ==
Soualem was born in Paris, the daughter of actors Hiam Abbas and Zinedine Soualem and sister of actress Mouna Soualem. She is of Palestinian descent on her mother's side and Algerian descent on her father's. Her maternal grandmother and great-grandmother were displaced from Tiberias during the Nakba. Soualem's mother would speak Palestinian Arabic at home, and the family regularly holidayed in Auvergne and Palestine.

Soualem studied History and Political Science at the Sorbonne.

== Career ==
Soualem began her career as a journalist and acted in her mother's film Inheritance (2012) and Rayhana Obermeyer's I Still Hide to Smoke (2016). She voiced Yassar in the 2018 Norwegian animated film The Tower and then featured in Hafsia Herzi's You Deserve a Lover the following year.

During this time, Soualem worked on her directorial debut and first documentary Their Algeria on her Algerian paternal grandparents and their immigration journey to France in the 1950s. She then served as a story editor and researcher on the 2022 Disney+ series Oussekine.

Soualem's second documentary Bye Bye Tiberias explores her own mother Hiam Abbas' background and family history as she left her Palestinian village to pursue an acting career before returning. Both Their Algeria and Bye Bye Tiberias depict "painful history" and its generational effects on families. Bye Bye Tiberias opened at the 2023 Venice Film Festival to critical acclaim. The film received a number of accolades, including a César Award nomination, in addition to being the Palestinian submission for the Academy Award for Best International Film.

Soualem will direct her first fiction feature film titled Alicante, starring her sister Mouna.

== Filmography ==
=== Filmmaking credits ===
Year	Title	Director	Writer	Other	Notes
2020	Their Algeria (French: Leur Algérie)	Yes	Yes	Cinematographer	Documentary
2022	Oussekine	No	Story editor	Researcher	4 episodes
2023	Bye Bye Tiberias	Yes	Yes	Additional cinematography, sound recordist	Documentary
TBA	Alicante				

=== Acting credits ===
Year	Title	Role	Notes
2003	La Légende de Parva	Indra	Voice role
2012	Inheritance	Alya	
2016	I Still Hide to Smoke	Meriem	
2018	The Tower	Yassar	Voice role
2019	You Deserve a Lover	Lina	
