= Antoine Chevrollier =

French film director

Antoine Chevrollier (born February 27, 1982) is a French film and television director, most noted for the 2022 miniseries Oussekine.

Prior to Oussekine, he directed episodes of the television series Baron Noir and The Bureau.

He has been a three-time ACS Awards nominee for Best Director, receiving nods in 2018 for Baron Noir, in 2019 for The Bureau, and in 2022 for Oussekine. He and the other writers of Oussekine won the award for Best Writing in 2022.

His debut feature film, Block Pass (La Pampa), was selected for the Critics' Week program at the 2024 Cannes Film Festival. He shot the film principally in and around his childhood hometown of Longué-Jumelles.
