= Inheritance (2012 film) =

- Theatrical poster
- Directed by: Hiam Abbass
- Written by: Hiam Abbass; Ala Hlehel
- Produced by: Arik Bernstein; David Silber; Nicolas Blanc; Ender Sevim; Faruk Özerten
- Starring: Hafsia Herzi; Hiam Abbass; Tom Payne
- Cinematography: Antoine Heberlé
- Edited by: Guy Lecorne
- Music by: Loik Dury
- Distributed by: Diaphana Films (France)
- Release dates: 31 August 2012 (Venice Film Festival); 2 October 2012 (Haifa International Film Festival); 12 December 2012 (France)
- Running time: 88 minutes
- Countries: Israel; France; Turkey
- Languages: Hebrew; French; Arabic; English

Inheritance (French: Héritage) is a 2012 drama film directed by and starring Hiam Abbass in her feature film directorial debut. It premiered at the Venice Film Festival and Haifa International Film Festival.

== Plot ==
A Palestinian family living in a small Muslim village in Galilee gathers to celebrate the wedding of one of their daughters, as war rages between Israel and Lebanon. Its many members symbolise a community struggling to maintain its identity, torn between modernity and tradition. In the midst of it all is a forbidden love story between the youngest daughter, Hajar (Hafsia Herzi), who has returned from studying abroad, and her Christian lover (Tom Payne). When their father falls into a coma and inches toward death, internal conflicts explode and the familial battles become as merciless as the outside war.

== Cast ==
- Hafsia Herzi as Hajar
- Hiam Abbass as Samira
- Yussef Abu Warda as Khalil
- Ashraf Barhom as Ahmad
- Ruba Blal as Saada
- Clara Khoury as Salma
- Makram Khoury as Abu Majd
- Khalifa Natour as Majd
- Tom Payne as Matthew
- Lina Soualem as Alya
- Mouna Soualem as Lana
- Ali Suliman as Marwan
- Ula Tabari as Zeinab
- G. A. Wasi as Cousin Ali

== Production ==
Abbass has stated: "Generally, when you are speaking about Palestinians, you think of them in Ramallah, or the refugees in Syria. Instead I wanted to tell this important part of society: the Palestinians of Israel, who feel partially excluded from the country in which they live, which is why they try and preserve their identity through a strong family structure which makes them feel at home."
