= Raja Amari =

Tunisian film director and script writer

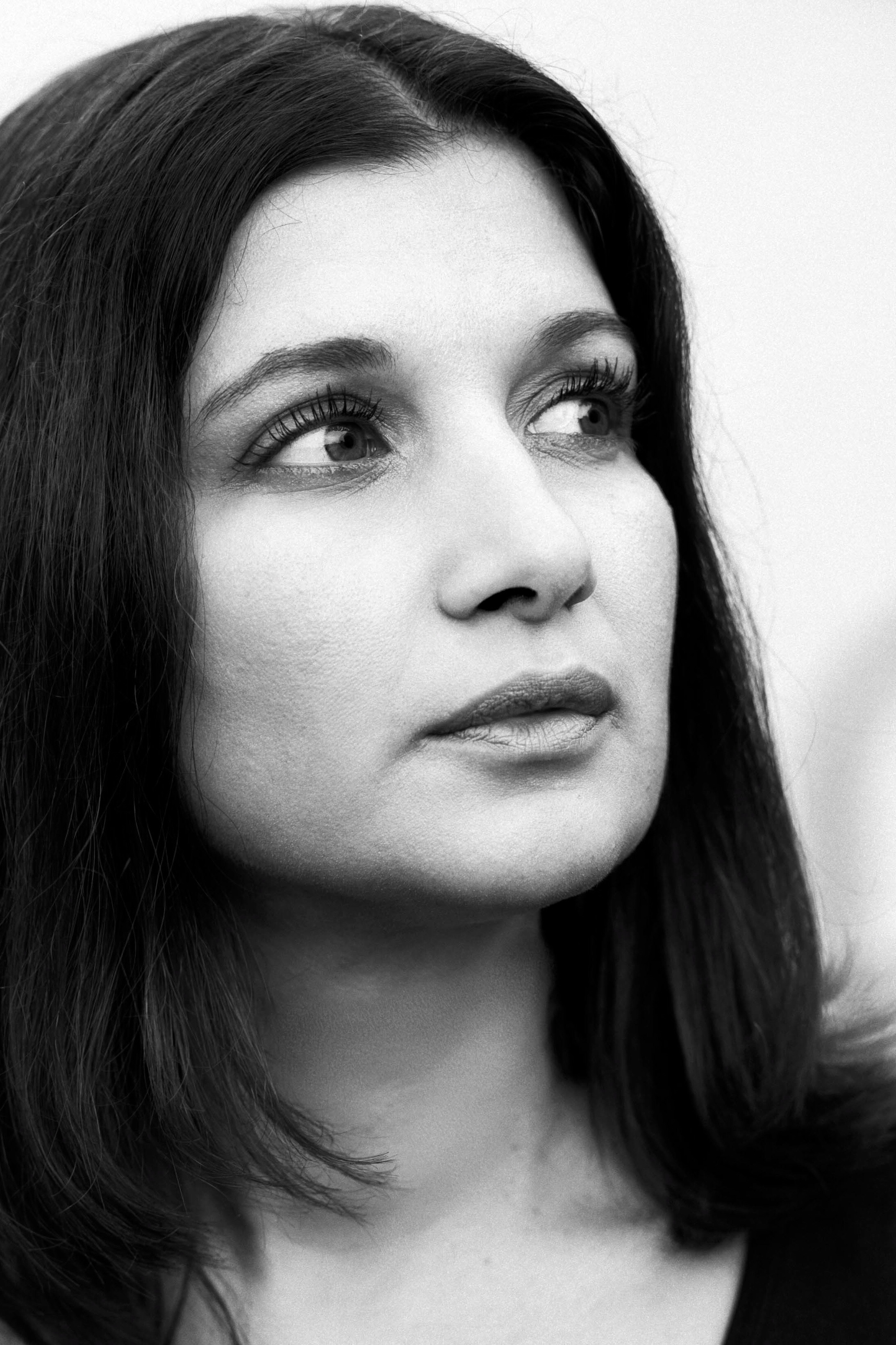
- Raja Amari official photo
- Born: April 4, 1971 (age 55); Tunis, Tunisia
- Education: University of Tunis
- Occupation: Film director

Raja Amari (Arabic: رجاء عماري; born 4 April 1971) is a Tunisian film director and script writer. She is best known for her films Satin Rouge/Red Satin (2002), and Dowaha/Les Secrets/Buried Secrets (2009), both of which have earned international awards and recognition.

== Early life and education ==
Born in Tunis, Amari trained in dance at the Conservatoire de Tunis, gaining first prize in dance in 1992. She then studied Italian at the Società Dante D'Alighieri in Tunis and later studied French Literature at the University of Tunis. For two years she wrote for Cinécrits, a film magazine edited by the "Association Tunisienne pour la promotion de la critique cinematographic." In 1995, Amari attended FEMIS (L'Institut de Formation et d'Enseignement pour les Metiers de l'Image et du Son) in Paris to study screenwriting. After graduating in 1998, she began to work on her film portfolio. Her film Satin Rouge was screened at la Berlinale 2002. Her film Buried Secrets was an official selection at the 2009 Venice International Film Festival.

In 2019, the Academy of Motion Picture Arts and Sciences invited her to become a member. She is also a member of the 50/50 collective, which aims to promote gender equality and diversity in cinema and audiovisual media.

== Career ==
Raja Amari has been said to have a "transvergent" style in her work. Stacey Weber-Fève, argued Amari's style means her work transcends national cinema and has the ability to connect with a "national identity" depending on the given context and temporality of her films. Will Higbee furthers the idea of "transvergent" filmmaking as a cinema that, "views the exchange between the global and the local not as taking place within some abstract or undefined 'global framework'." Rather, "difference and imbalances of power" between and within film industries tend to shape cinema.

When asked about her influences, Amari responded in an interview with Indiewire that they include François Ozon and Arnaud Desplechin.

"I have always wanted to make a film revolving around belly dancing. I trained for many years as a belly dancer at the Conservatoire de Tunis [Academic Dance Institute in Tunis]. I also grew up watching musicals of the golden age of Egyptian cinema from the 1940s and 1950s that are still played on television today. My mother and I loved the well-known belly dancer Samia Gamal and the singer Farid al-Atrash." -Raja Amari, Interview with Bouziane Daoudi in Zeitgeist Films

=== Film ===
==== Satin Rouge / Red Satin (2002) ====
Satin Rouge follows widowed Tunisian mother Lilia, (Hiam Abbas) as she radically transforms from housewife to cabaret dancer. Her transformation begins when she becomes suspicious of her teenage daughter, Selma (Hend el Fahem) of engaging in a secret relationship with Chokri (Maher Kamoun), a darbouka drummer in Selma's dance class. To find out more, Lilia decides to follow Chokri one day. On her escapade, she follows him into his second workplace: a cabaret club. After overcoming her initial shock, Lilia becomes drawn towards the dancers and drum music. The women are very different from Lilia: they wear colourful clothing, they are showing their midriffs, and they are dancing in a sensual manner to the drumbeat. After befriending the lead dancer, Folla (Monia Hichri), Lilia is convinced to start dancing in the cabaret club. While Lilia begins dancing nightly, she simultaneously begins a romantic relationship with Chokri, who is still unaware that Lilia is Selma's mother. When Chokri ends his affair with Lilia, she is heartbroken. She later finds out it is because Selma has asked Chokri to meet her and Chokri, realizing his relationship with Selma is getting serious, accepts. The uneasy 'first' meeting Selma organizes between Chokri and Lilia solidifies Lilia's full transformation. When at the start of the film she is seen as a sad, bored, and submissive woman who rarely leaves the comforts of home, she is now a dominant matriarchal figure, which is reestablished with Lilia's glance in the mirror at herself prior to Chokri and Selma's arrival.

"Typically, in Arab films and Tunisian films you have a woman who is in conflict with the society, and she'll fight against it. I didn't want that. That was not my subject. Lilia, the character played by Haim Abbass, actually finds her freedom in the context of what I call social hypocrisy. She is involved in a society that is hypocritical in the sense that there are two worlds out there: the world of the night and the world of the day. What you do--what you really do--you do not show. She finds a compromise in the sense that society is like that. She just adapts to society. She does what she wants, but she doesn't show it to the world." -Raja Amari, Indiewire, August 20, 2002

Amari’s work, particularly Red Satin has been argued to have opened up new avenues and opportunities for the portrayal of Tunisian women in film and society. Author Stacey Weber-Fève asserts that Amari’s portrayal of the protagonist, Lilia, performing housework in the first few scenes of the film, “captures concretely the possibility for (re)appropriating female representation in contemporary North African cinema.” She also asserts that Amari, “levies new debates addressing interpretations of performances of women’s traditional roles and desire for self-expression in contemporary Tunisian society by engaging in a multilayered manner the ideological implications of this traditional social construct of the housewife and her comportment.”

==== Printemps Tunisien / Tunisian Spring (2014) ====
In Melissa Thackway and Olivier Bartlet's review of the 2015 Panafrican Film and Television Festival of Ouagadougou (Festival Panafricain du Cinéma de Ouagadougou, FESPACO) in "FESPACO 2015: After the Transition, What Next?", they remark that Amari's film about the Tunisian Spring was the only film that stood out among the 'Features' portion of the festival. They noted that the film was "a quality television drama about a group of young musicians' diverging response to the turbulence of the Arab Spring."

== Personal life ==
Raja Amari currently resides in Paris, France.

== Filmography ==
- Le Bouquet / The Bouquet, 1995
- Avril / April, 1998
- Un soir de juillet / An Evening in July, 2000
- al-Sitar al-ahmar / Satin Rouge / Red Satin, 2002
- Seekers of Oblivion, [DOC] 2004
- Dowaha / Les secrets / Secrets, 2009
- Tunisian Spring, 2014
- Foreign Body, 2016

== Awards and nominations ==
Year	Award	Film	Result	Reference
1998	Special Jury Prize at Milano Film Festival	Avril/April	Won	
1998	Special Jury Prize at Tunis Short Films Festival	Avril/April	Won	
1998	Best Cinematography Award at International Short Film Festival, Greece	Avril/April	Won	
1998	Prix de la Qualité at Centre national du cinéma et de l'image animée (CNC)	Avril/April	Won	
2001	First Prize at Milan Festival	Un soir de juillet/An Evening in July	Won	
2001	Golden Dhow (Best short feature film) at Zanzibar Film Festival	Un soir de juillet/An Evening in July	Won	
2002	New Director's Showcase Award at Seattle International Film Festival	Satin rouge/Red satin	Won	
2002	Best African Film Award at Montreal World Film Festival	Satin rouge/Red satin	Won	
2002	Audience Award Maine International Film Festival	Satin rouge/Red satin	Won	
2002	Best Feature Film Award at Torino Film Festival	Satin rouge/Red satin	Won	
2002	Special Mention for William Holden Screenplay Award at Torino Film Festival	Satin rouge/Red satin	Won	
