= Virgil (film) =

- Theatrical release poster
- Directed by: Mabrouk El Mechri
- Written by: Mabrouk El Mechri
- Produced by: Sidonie Dumas
- Starring: Jalil Lespert; Léa Drucker; Jean-Pierre Cassel; Philippe Nahon; Patrick Floersheim; Karim Belkhadra; Sami Zitouni; Jean-Marie Frin; Tomer Sisley
- Cinematography: Mabrouk El Mechri
- Music by: Frédéric Verrières
- Production company: Gaumont
- Distributed by: Gaumont Columbia Tristar Films
- Release date: September 2005
- Running time: 93 minutes
- Country: France
- Language: French

Virgil is a 2005 comedy drama film written and directed by French-Tunisian director Mabrouk El Mechri, his first feature film. It had its first public screening in movie theaters starting September 2005. The film is about the life of a French boxer in the French suburbs.

== Synopsis ==
Every week, Virgil dreams of his father Ernest telling him about his earlier life as a boxer. And every week he dreams of a crossing glance from a young woman named Margot. This week, his father announces that he will finally come to see his son fight on the boxing ring. One problem: Virgil has not been boxing for the last three years.

== Cast ==
- Jalil Lespert as Virgil
- Léa Drucker as Margot
- Jean-Pierre Cassel as Ernest
- Philippe Nahon as Louis
- Patrick Floersheim as Dunlopillo
- Karim Belkhadra as Sid
- Sami Zitouni as Kader
- Jean-Marie Frin as Mario Taliori
- Tomer Sisley as Dino Taliori
- Jean-Luc Abel as Marcel
- Marc Duret as Man in the kitchen
