= Killing of Malik Oussekine =

1986 police killing of a French-Algerian student

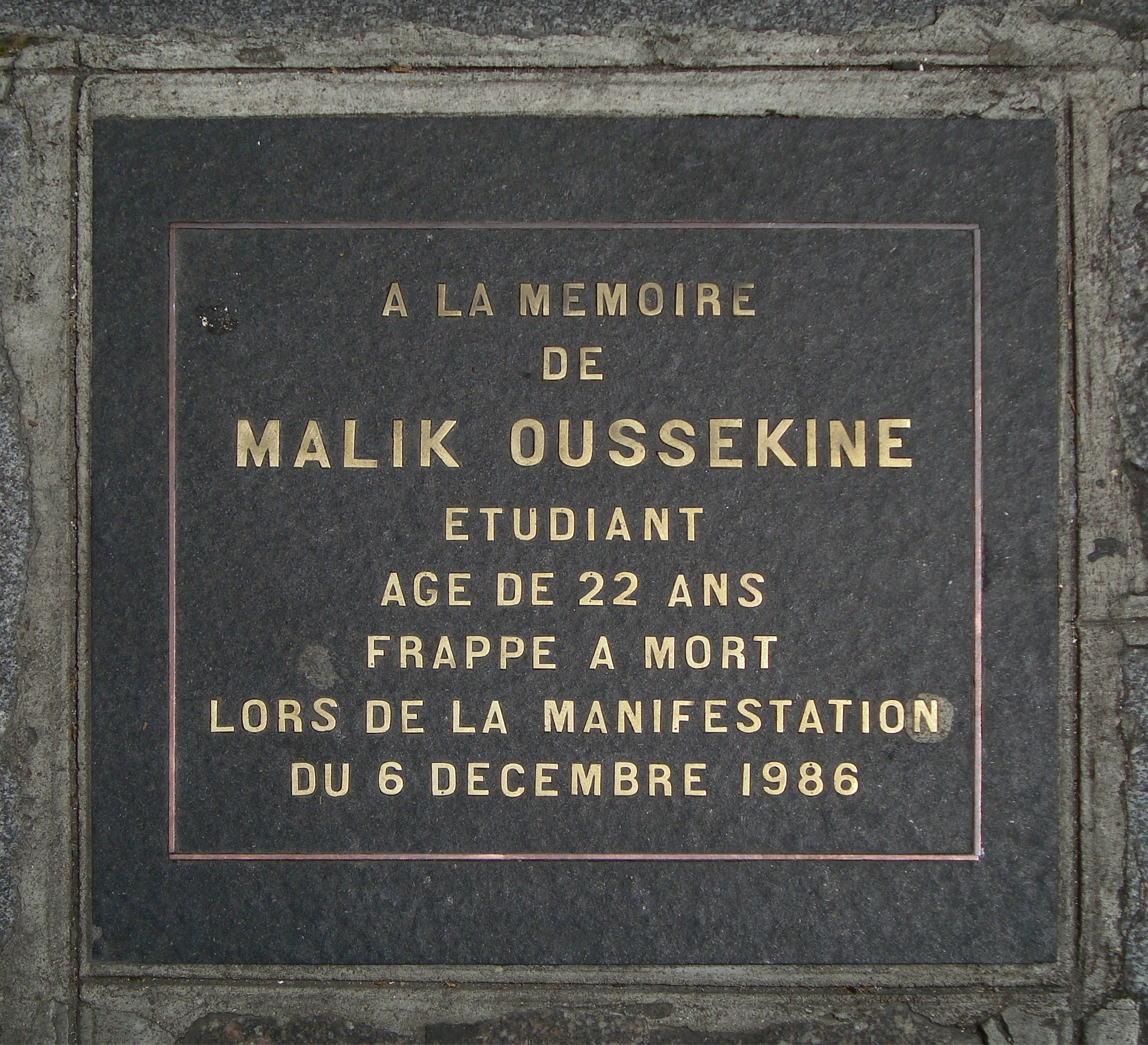
- Commemorative plaque on the sidewalk in front of the 20 of the rue Monsieur-le-Prince.
- Date: 6 December 1986
- Location: Paris, Île-de-France, France; 48.8500417°N 2.3398019°E
- Type: Police violence
- Deaths: 1

Malik Oussekine (16 October 1964 – 6 December 1986) was a French student of Algerian origin. He had been walking near student protests in Paris opposing university reforms (the so-called "Devaquet bill," named after politician Alain Devaquet) and proposed immigration restrictions. Though uninvolved in the demonstration, Oussekine was chased by police and beaten to death. Oussekine was transported to a nearby hospital where he was later pronounced dead, though it was later revealed that he had died at the spot of the attack. News of his killing intensified the protests, and the laws were scrapped two days later.

Silent protests were held by students in the wake of his death first in Paris and then across France in more than 36 towns. His death occurred twenty-five years after the October 1961 massacre, in which at least 200 Algerian protesters were killed by police in Paris.

== The victim ==
Malik Oussekine
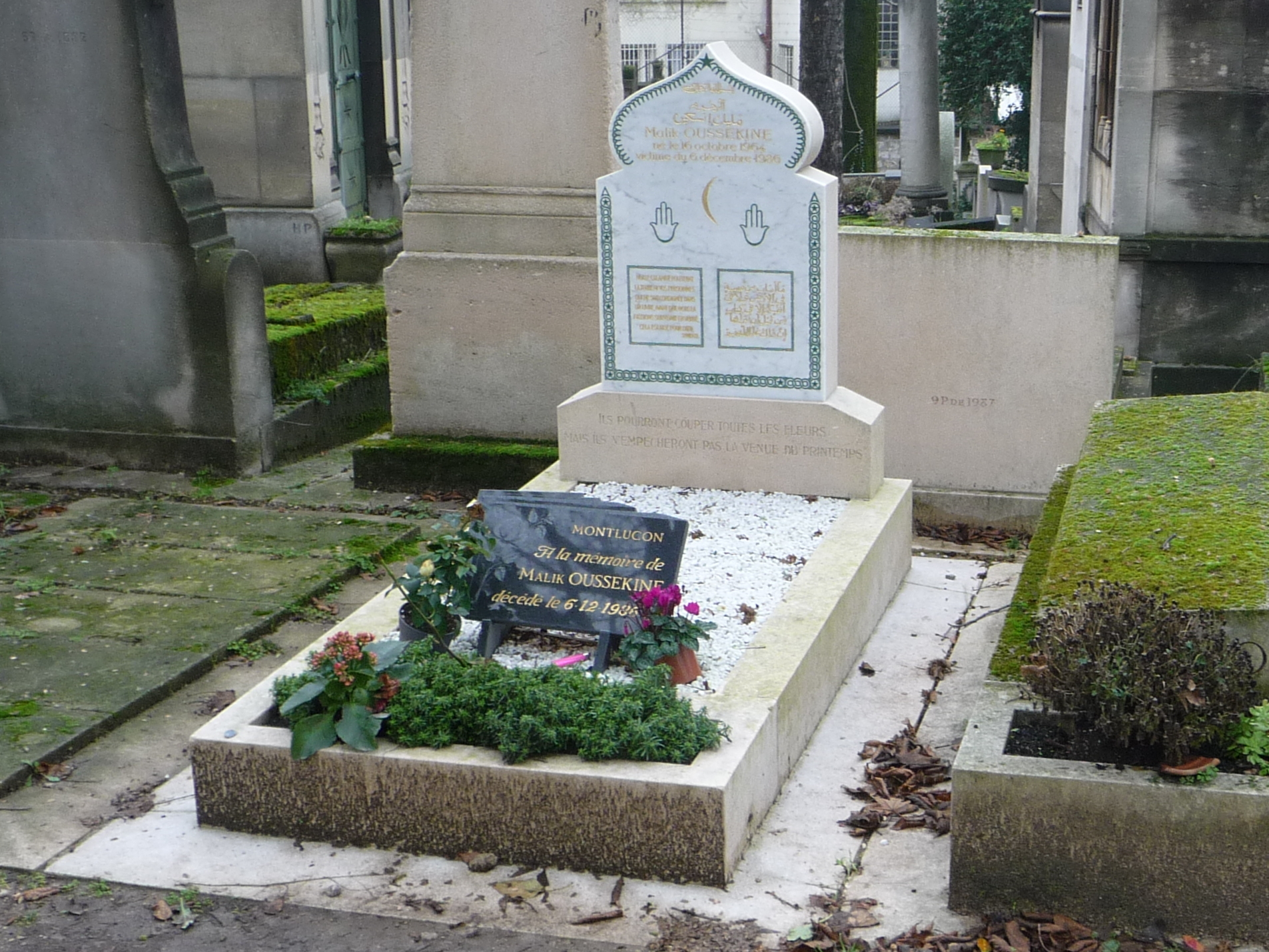
- Born: 16 October 1964; Versailles, Yvelines, Île-de-France, France
- Died: 6 December 1986 (aged 22); Paris, Île-de-France, France
- Resting place: Père Lachaise Cemetery

Malik Oussekine was 22 years old at the time of his death. It was later revealed that he was a student at the École supérieure des professions immobilières (ESPI). A few months after his death, the press mentioned his attempts to become a priest. His sister Sarah Nassera said: "He wanted to become a Jesuit priest and he always had his Bible with him.”

Oussekine lost his father, Miloud Oussekine, in 1978. He had fought in the French army during the Second World War before returning to Algeria to get married and then returning to France to earn a living mining coal in Thionville, Lorraine. He then worked as a bricklayer and as a truck driver. His wife Aïcha joined him in Lorraine in 1953. The family then settled in Meudon-la-Forêt, where the seven children grew up with the support of their older brother Mohamed. Malik Oussekine was the youngest of the children.

Oussekine overcame kidney problems to become an avid basketball player in the greater Paris suburb of Boulogne-Billancourt. He also played guitar.

Oussekine was buried in the Père Lachaise Cemetery in Paris (division 75) on 10 December 1986.

== Death ==
Student protesters had gathered on 17 November with about 200,000 protestors and then again on 6 December with about 500,000 students protesting against the proposed Devaquet Project, which would institute a selection process for university entrance. The night of 6 December 1986, Oussekine was chased by police and beaten to death after being suspected of participating in a student protest in Paris.

Oussekine's death was witnessed by Paul Bayzelon, a civil servant in the Ministry of Finance: "I was returning home. As I closed the door after dialling the code, I saw the distraught face of a young man. I let him pass and I wanted to close the door. […] Two policemen rushed into the hall, rushed on the guy and beat him with incredible violence. He fell, they continued beating with truncheons and kicking him in the stomach and back. Oussekine shouted: “I did nothing, I did nothing”. Paul Bayzelon tried to come to the aid of the young man but he, too, was beaten with batons.

Ten minutes later, the emergency services arrived and provided first aid, then transported Oussekine to intensive care at Cochin hospital, where he was officially declared dead at 3:20 a.m. Oussekine actually died at midnight in the hall of the building, as was revealed 4 days later by the medical examiner. Oussekine was transported to the hospital in the hope of absolving the police officers, according to the Oussekine family's lawyer Georges Kiejman.

== Aftermath ==
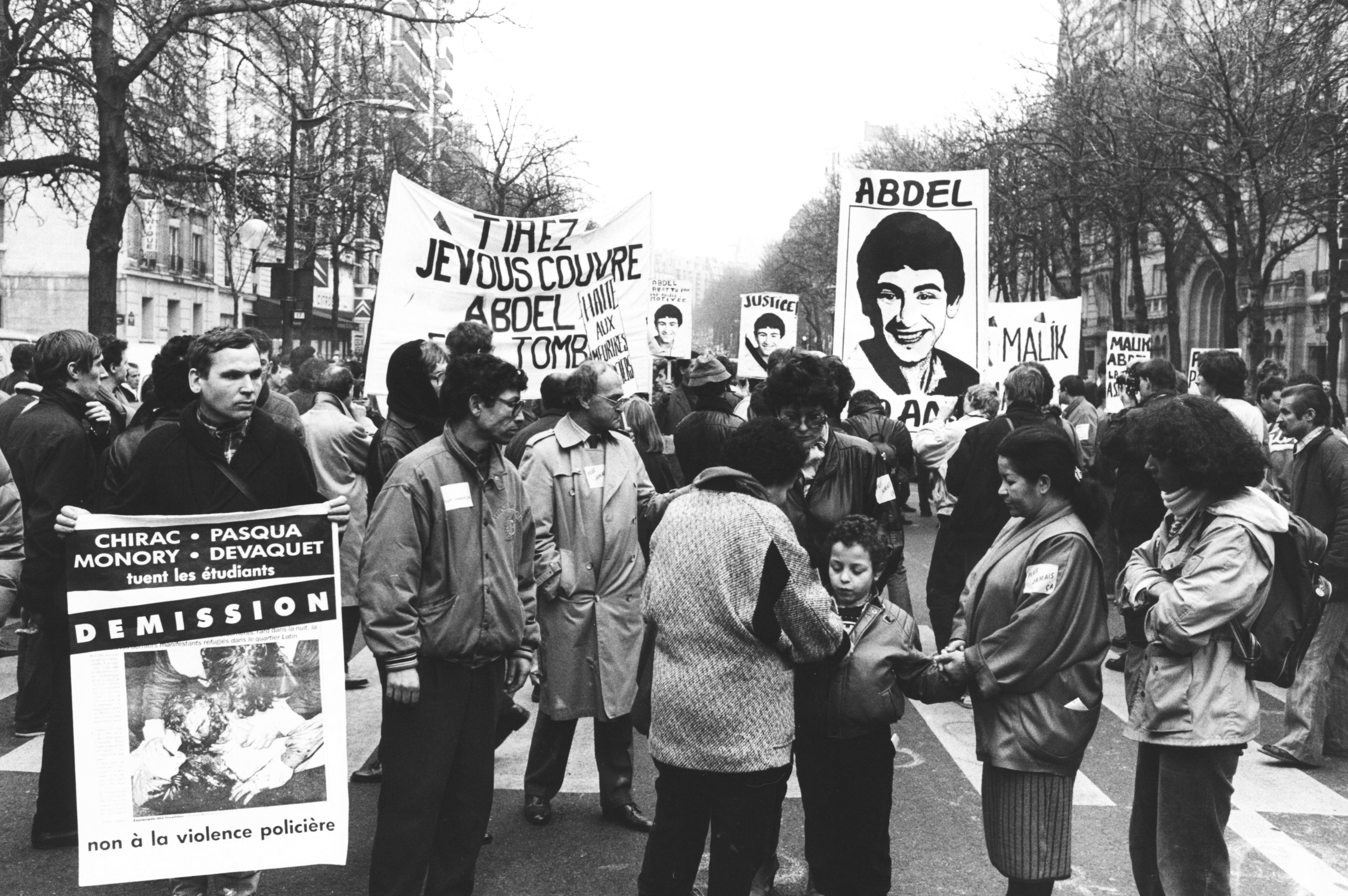
Demonstration in Paris against police violence following the deaths of Malik Oussekine and Abdel Benyahiadel

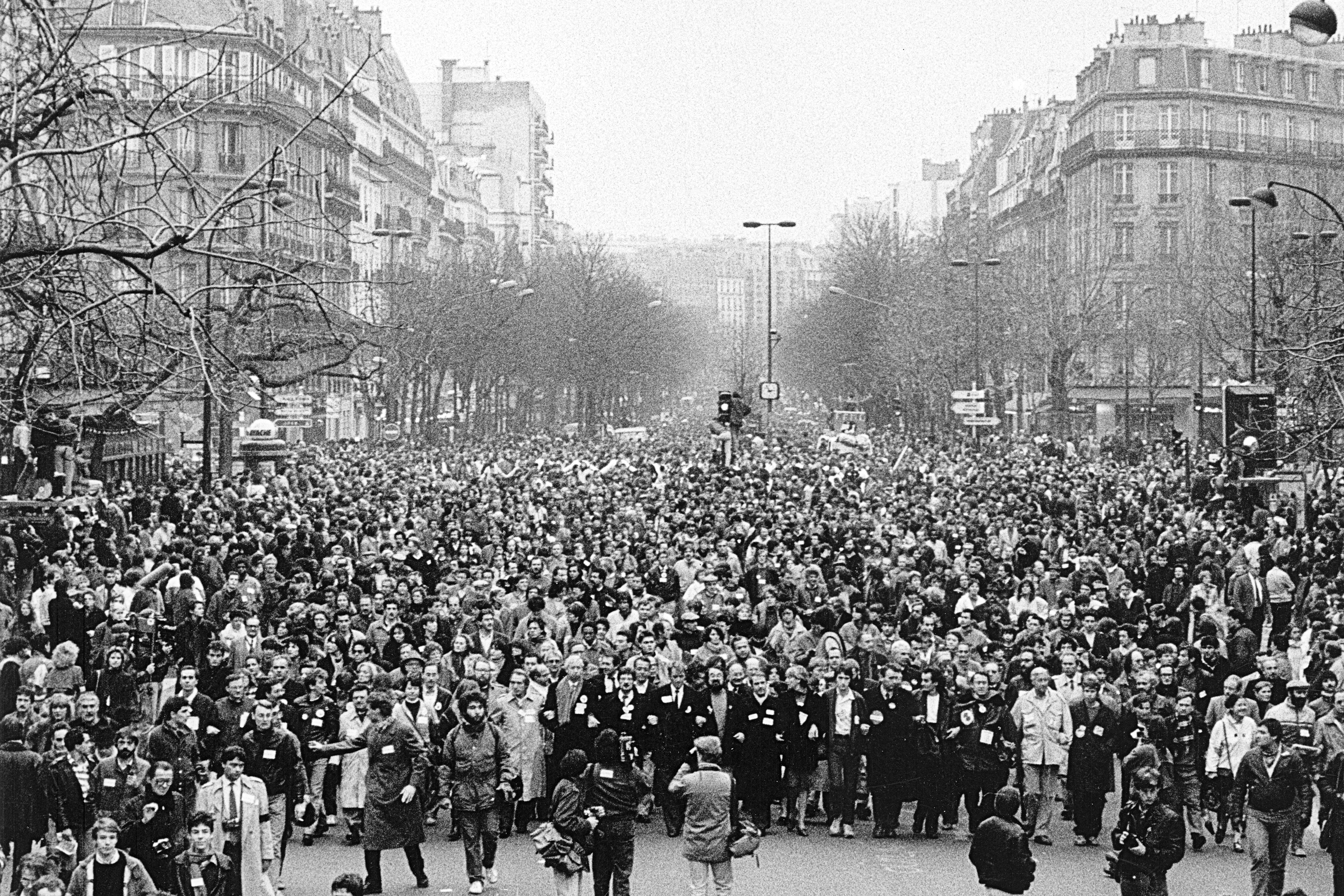
Silent march in Paris following the killing of Malik Oussekine by the police.

His death was met with widespread outrage and sympathy from the public, who viewed Oussekine as an innocent victim. There was never any indication that he had participated in the violence or the demonstrations, and his medical conditions helped portray him as such. Further support was garnered after remarks made by Robert Pandraud, the French National Security Minister who blamed Oussekine's father for allowing him to be out at night with his medical conditions. Researchers have also identified Oussekine's death as a turning point for the student protests, with a strong focus on the Minister of Interior and "the entire security and racist policy of the government."

Oussekine's death sparked violent unrest in Paris. 30,000 protestors gathered outside of the hospital where he died, leading to a riot and clashes with police. A rally was also held outside of Paris' city hall and in the Latin Quarter, with both gatherings eventually leading to riots and skirmishing between police and demonstrators. 200,000 people took to the streets of Paris on 10 December, in a day of demonstrations in memory of Oussekine.

Protesters demanded the dismissal of Charles Pasqua, Interior Minister and head of the police, and the resignation of the prime minister. Higher Education Minister Alain Devaquet, who was responsible for guiding the controversial law through the National Assembly, resigned hours after news of Oussekine's death broke out.

Several sessions held in the National Assembly had to be suspended following fiery exchanges between left-wing and far-right deputies over the police officers' excessive use of force.

In January 1990, Chief Brigadier Jean Schmitt and officer Christophe Garcia were found guilty of "unlawful assault and battery, by law enforcement officers, leading to death without intent to kill" for having caused the death of Oussekine. Garcia, who had confessed to having struck Oussekine, was sentenced to a two-year suspended prison term and the decision was not to appear on his criminal record. Schmitt, who denied his participation in the violence, was given a five-year suspended sentence.

== Depiction in media ==
The 1995 film La Haine, which follows three young immigrant men living in the Paris suburbs was in part inspired by the death of Oussekine. The character Vinz alludes to Oussekine's death in one scene of the film.

In May 2022 it was announced that the first French commission from Disney+ would be a miniseries of his death and the following national outcry and protests, titled Oussekine.

The film titled Nos frangins (Our Brothers), written, directed, and produced by Rachid Bouchareb, premiered at the 2022 Cannes Film Festival and went on general release in France in December 2022.

== See also ==
- Demonstration of 14 July 1953 – Bastille Day violence in Paris, France
- Killing of Nahel Merzouk – 2023 police shooting in France
- Death of Adama Traoré – 2016 death in France; death under police custody
