= Mabrouk El Mechri =

French director, screenwriter, and actor (born 1976)

- Born: 18 September 1976 (age 50); Versailles, France
- Years active: 1998–present
- Children: 2

Mabrouk el Mechri (born 18 September 1976) is a French director, screenwriter, and actor.

== Biography ==
El Mechri was born in Versailles near Paris, France. He has directed a number of films. After his three shorts Mounir et Anita, Generation Cutter, and Concours de circonstance, he directed his first long feature Virgil in 2005 about the life of a boxer, followed by a comedy entitled Stand Up!. His 2008 movie entitled JCVD about Jean-Claude Van Damme and featuring him as the actor garnered Mabrouk El Mechri critical acclaim. The film, a comedy drama and at certain times biographical of Van Damme was screened at the Cannes Film Festival, 2008 Rome Film Festival (L'Altro Cinema), and the 2008 Toronto International Film Festival (Midnight Madness).

He was married to actress Audrey Dana, with whom he had a child in 2008. Until 2014 he was in a relationship with Virginie Efira with whom he had a daughter, Ali born on 24 May 2013 in Paris.

== Filmography ==
Director

- Mounir et Anita (1998)
- Generation Cutter (2000)
- Concours de circonstances (2003)
- Virgil (2005)
- Stand Up! (2006)
- JCVD (2008)
- The Cold Light of Day (2012)

Screenwriter

- Mounir et Anita (1998)
- Generation Cutter (2000)
- Concours de circonstances (2003)
- Virgil (2005)
- JCVD (2008)
- Kung Fu Zohra (2021)

Actor

- Gomez et Tavarès (2007) directed by Gilles Paquet-Brenner in the role of Rachid

Cinematographer

- Stand Up! (2006)

Composer

- Mounir et Anita (1998)
