= Fallen In Love =

2012 novel by Lauren Kate

- First edition
- Author: Lauren Kate
- Language: English
- Series: Fallen
- Genre: Young adult fantasy romance
- Publisher: Delacorte Books
- Publication date: January 24, 2012
- Publication place: United States
- Media type: Print
- Pages: 256

Fallen In Love is a novel written by Lauren Kate and was published on January 24, 2012. This book is a young adult fiction novel based on the characters from that author's most notable series, Fallen.

== Synopsis ==
The author takes the characters from her series Fallen and writes more in depth about them, especially Lucinda and Daniel. Lauren Kate was inspired by her fans to write this novel. The novel is set during the most romantic holiday of the year, Valentine's Day, and tells the stories of each couple in the book and how their dates play out. Each story in the book is narrated by that particular person.

== Characters ==
- Lucinda (Luce) Price – She is the main character in the series. She spends Valentine's Day with Daniel.
- Daniel Grigori – The male main character and Luce's boyfriend. They spend Valentine's Day together.
- Arriane Alter – Another fallen angel. Her love story is defined as "Forbidden, a love so fierce it burns". This story reveals the cause of Arriane's scar and states that Arriane had a female lover. However, this is not mentioned in any of the books in the series.
- Gabrielle (Gabbe) Givens – She is a fallen angel sided with God. She makes an appearance in Arriane's story.
- Roland Sparks – A demon who sided with Lucifer, his story is defined as "Unrequited".
- Miles Fisher – He is a nephilim from Shoreline, Miles finds love where he least expects it.
- Shelby – A nephilim from Shoreline, she shares a love story with Miles on the book.
- Rosaline – She is Roland's platonical love and the second protagonist in his love story. She is not mentioned in any other book.
- Tessriel – Also known as Tess, she is Arriane's female lover. She is one of Lucifer's closest demons and tries to pull Arriane to Lucifer's side so they can be together.

== Other books by Lauren Kate ==
- The Betrayal of Natalie Hargrove

Fallen Series

- Fallen
- Torment
- Passion
- Rapture

Teardrop Series

- Teardrop
- Waterfall
