= Fallen (2024 TV series) =

2024 English-language television series

- Genre: Romance; Fantasy
- Created by: Rachel Paterson; Roland Moore; Claudia Bluemhuber
- Based on: Fallen by Lauren Kate
- Written by: Rachel Paterson; Roland Moore
- Directed by: Matt Hastings; Claudia Bluemhuber; Farhad Mann
- Starring: Jessica Alexander; Gijs Blom; Timothy Innes; Josefine Koenig; Sarah Niles; Alexander Siddig
- Composer: Jeff Cardoni
- Countries of origin: Switzerland; Germany
- Original language: English
- No. of seasons: 1
- No. of episodes: 8

Production
- Executive producers: Claudia Bluemhuber; Matt Hastings; Herbert Kloiber
- Producer: Jonathan Halperyn
- Cinematography: Mahlon Todd Williams
- Running time: 50 minutes approx.
- Production companies: Silver Reel; Night Train Media

Original release
- Network: Globoplay (Brazil); AMC (US)
- Release: 12 August 2024

Fallen is an English-language romantic fantasy television series. It is based on the 2009 novel of the same name by Lauren Kate. It was developed by Silver Reel and Night Train Media for Brazil's Globoplay. It was first aired on Globoplay on 12 August 2024 and around the world in fall of 2024. In 2025, the series won the International Emmy Award for Best Kids: Live-Action programme.

== Cast ==
=== Main ===
- Jessica Alexander as Lucinda "Luce" Price
- Gijs Blom as Daniel Grigori
- Timothy Innes as Cameron "Cam" Briel
- Josefine Koenig as Arriane Alter
- Sarah Niles as Miriam / Sophia
- Alexander Siddig as Howson

=== Recurring ===
- Esme Kingdom as Penn
- Indeyarna Donaldson-Holness as Gabrielle "Gabbe" Givens
- Lawrence Walker as Roland Sparks
- Maura Bird as Molly Kane
- Sam Bell as Tasha
- Laura Majid
- Courtney Chen
- Julian Krenn
- James Callis as Edward

== Production ==
It was reported in February 2021 that a television adaptation of Lauren Kate's novel was in development. The eight-part series was confirmed to have been picked up by Brazil's Globoplay in September 2022, with Claudia Bluemhuber of the Zurich-based production company Silver Reel attached as Executive Producer. Bluemhuber had previously worked as a producer on the 2016 film adaptation. Matt Hastings would show-run and direct the series with Rachel Paterson and Roland Moore writing it. Bluemhuber, Hastings, and Herbert Kloiber of the Munich-based Night Train Media served as executive producers. Hastings spoke of their hope to "reach the new adult audience".

Also in September 2022, it was announced Alexander Siddig, Sarah Niles, Jessica Alexander, Gijs Blom, and Timothy Innes would star in the series. Also joining the cast were Josefine Koenig, Esme Kingdom, Maura Bird, Lawrence Walker, Indeyarna Donaldson-Holness, Sam Bell, Julian Krenn, Laura Majid and Courtney Chen.

Principal photography took place in Budapest over the course of four or five months.

== Episodes ==
| No. | Episode | Directed by | Written by | Original release date | Viewers (millions) |
|---|---|---|---|---|---|
| 1 | Sword and Cross | Matthew Hastings | Rachel Paterson and Roland Moore | 12 August 2024 | N/A |
| 2 | Stolen Time | Matthew Hastings | Rachel Paterson and Roland Moore | 12 August 2024 | N/A |
| 3 | Butterfly | Matthew Hastings | Rachel Paterson and Roland Moore | 12 August 2024 | N/A |
| 4 | Outcast | Matthew Hastings | Rachel Paterson and Roland Moore | 12 August 2024 | N/A |
| 5 | The Girl from Anavarzine | Claudia Bluemhuber | Rachel Paterson and Roland Moore | 12 August 2024 | N/A |
| 6 | Six Characters in Search of an Exit | Farhad Mann | Rachel Paterson and Roland Moore | 12 August 2024 | N/A |
| 7 | The Storm | Claudia Bluemhuber | Rachel Paterson and Roland Moore | 12 August 2024 | N/A |
| 8 | Secrets and Shadows | Farhad Mann | Rachel Paterson and Roland Moore | 12 August 2024 | N/A |
