= Deleila Piasko =

Swiss actress

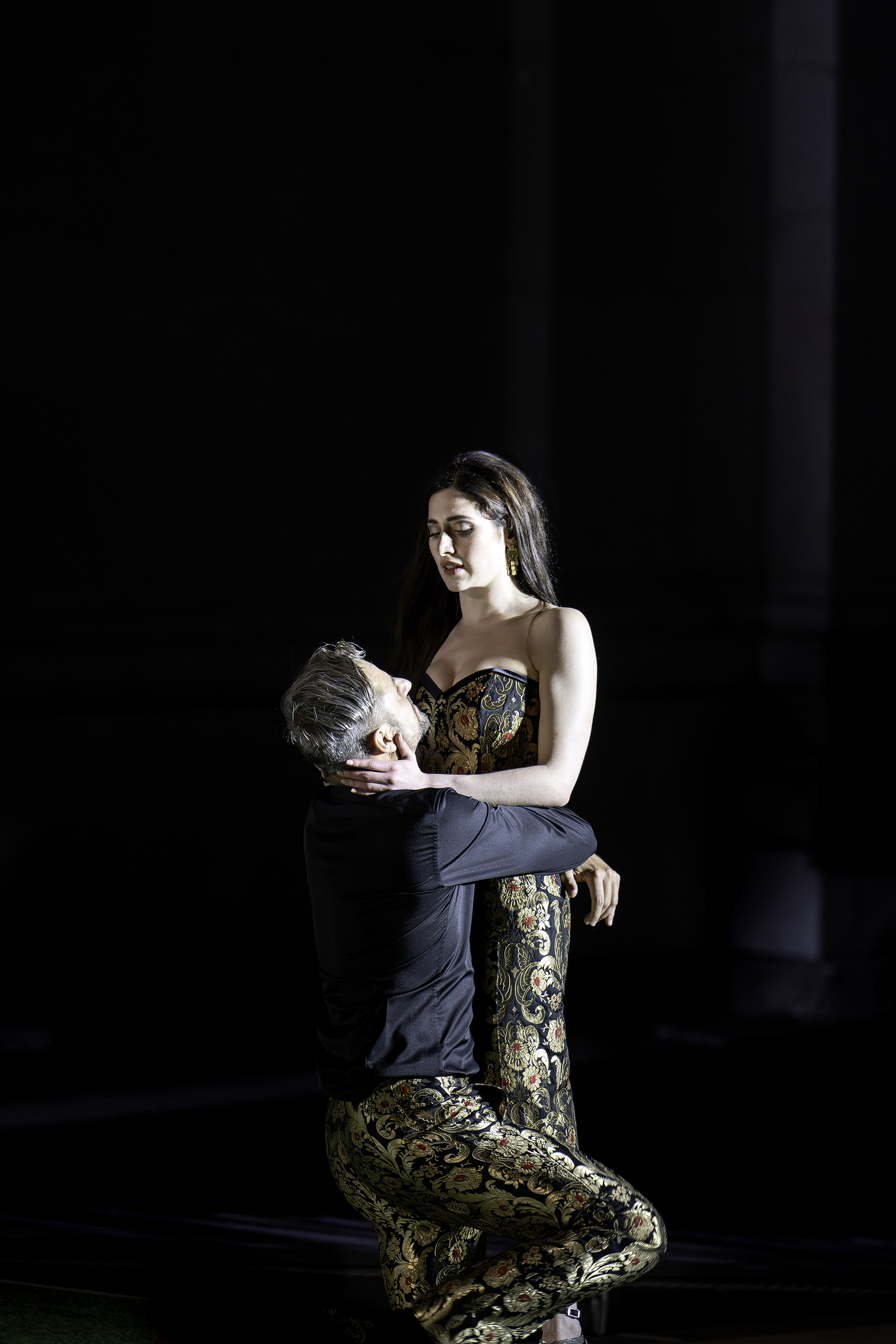
- Piasko and Philipp Hochmair in Jedermann at the Salzburg Festival, 2024
- Born: 2 May 1991 (age 35); Zürich, Switzerland
- Education: Ernst Busch Academy of Dramatic Arts
- Occupation: Actress
- Years active: 2004-present
- Television: Transatlantic

Deleila Piasko (born 2 May 1991) is a Swiss actress. She is best known for playing Lisa Fittko in Netflix's World War II miniseries Transatlantic.

== Early life ==
Piasko was born into a Jewish family on 2 May 1991. From Zürich, the eldest of three children born to a physicist father and dancer mother. She moved to Berlin aged 20 where she attended the Ernst Busch Academy of Dramatic Arts.

== Career ==
=== Stage ===
After graduating from Berlin's Ernst Busch Academy of Dramatic Arts in Berlin, she had stage roles in Zürich, Frankfurt and Dresden. In 2019, she joined the Burgtheater in Vienna under director Martin Kušej. In November 2023, it was announced that she would take on the role of Buhlschaft in Jedermann at the 2024 Salzburg Festival alongside Philipp Hochmair.

=== Film and television ===
In 2018, Piasko appeared in an adaptation of the Charlotte Link novel Im Tal des Fuchses, produced by Degeto Film. She appeared in a 2021 adaptation of the Thomas Mann novel Confessions of Felix Krull entitled Bekenntnisse des Hochstaplers Felix Krull, in which she played Zouzou Kuckuck. She also appears in Leander Haußmann ensemble piece Stasi.

Piasko portrayed the real-life French Resistance member Lisa Fittko in the Netflix series Transatlantic. Her performance was singled out by Daniel Fienberg in The Hollywood Reporter for bringing life to her character. In 2023, she had the lead role in the six-part German-language series Der Schatten. That year she started filming a six-part political thriller called Turmschatten for Paramount+. She was also cast in the title role in Lili from Thomas Imbach, an adaptation of Fräulein Else by Arthur Schnitzler, in which she will be appearing alongside Milan Peschel.

Piasko will co-star opposite Rafe Spall in the television series The Death of Sherlock Holmes, set to air in 2027.

== Partial filmography ==
Year	Title	Role	Notes
2004	Sternenberg	Corinne	
2006	Cannabis	Sabrina	
2012	Boys Are Us	Laura	
2016	Dancing Quietly	Maria	
2017	Papa Moll	Jungfrau	
2018	Wolfsland	Paula	1 episode
2019	Der Zürich-Krimi	Minou	1 episode
2016	Der Lissabon-Krimi	Ines Silva	1 episode
2020	Im Tal des Fuchses	Debbie Lee	TV movie
2021	Bekenntnisse des Hochstaplers Felix Krull	Zouzou Kuckuck	
2022	Hamilton	Ina	2 episodes
2022	Stasikomödie	Natalie	Film
2022	Hotel Europa	Claire Deltour	Miniseries (Episode 2)
2023	Transatlantic	Lisa Fittko	7 episodes
2023	Der Schatten	Norah Richter	6 episodes
2024	Turmschatten	Shalhevet Ehrenberg	
2025	Dangerous Truth	Simin	6 episodes
2025	Naktgeld	Lili	
2025	Asbestos	Maria Melnik	6 episodes
2027	The Death of Sherlock Holmes	Alma Kohler	Upcoming
