= El-Badr Mosque =

Mosque, former synagogue, in Marseille, France

- Mosquée El-Badr
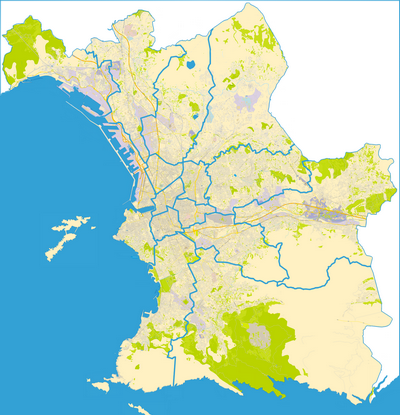
- Location of the mosque in Marseille

Religion
- Affiliation: Islam
- Ecclesiastical or organizational status: Mosque (since 2020s); Synagogue (1962–2016)
- Status: Active (as a mosque)

Location
- Location: 14 rue Saint Dominique, Marseille
- Country: France
- Interactive map of El-Badr Mosque
- Coordinates: 43°18′01″N 5°22′48″E

Architecture
- Type: Mosque (current); Synagogue (former)
- Completed: c. 2020s (as a mosque); 1962 (as a synagogue)

The El-Badr Mosque (French: Mosquée El-Badr) is a mosque located in the 1st arrondissement of Marseille, France. Acquired by the Al Badr Muslim Association in 2016, the building was a former Jewish synagogue called the Or Thora Synagogue, also referred to as the Or Torah Synagogue ('Light of the Torah' synagogue), that was established by pieds-noirs in 1962.

Prior to acquiring the former synagogue at 14 rue Saint Dominique, the mosque was located at 206 Chemin Saint-Joseph à Sainte-Marthe.

== History ==
=== As a synagogue ===
The synagogue was established by pieds-noirs from French Algeria in 1962. It is located on the Rue Saint Dominique, off the Boulevard d'Athènes, between the Gare de Marseille-Saint-Charles and the Canebière, in the 1st arrondissement of Marseille.

As a result of antisemitism in Marseille, the synagogue ceased operating.

=== As a mosque ===
Concurrently, the nearby mosque, run by the Al Badr Muslim Association, was unable to handle the weekly overcrowding. The synagogue building was sold in 2016 for €400,000 to the Al Badr Muslim Association, a Muslim organization. The Association planned to turn it into a mosque to accommodate some of the, as of 2016, approximately 220,000 Muslims living in Marseille.

Conversion of the building to a mosque was completed in the c. 2020s.

== See also ==
- History of the Jews in France
- Islam in France
- List of mosques in France
- List of synagogues in France
