= Transatlantic (TV series) =

2023 TV series created by Anna Winger and Daniel Hendler

- Promotional poster
- Created by: Anna Winger; Daniel Hendler
- Based on: The Flight Portfolio by Julie Orringer
- Directed by: Stéphanie Chuat; Véronique Reymond; Mia Meyer
- Starring: Gillian Jacobs; Lucas Englander; Cory Michael Smith; Ralph Amoussou; Deleila Piasko; Amit Rahav; Grégory Montel; Corey Stoll
- Countries of origin: Germany; France
- Original languages: English; German; French
- No. of episodes: 7

Production
- Executive producers: Anna Winger; Camille McCurry
- Cinematography: Wolfgang Thaler
- Running time: 47–54 minutes
- Production company: Studio Airlift

Original release
- Network: Netflix
- Release: April 7, 2023

Transatlantic is a historical drama miniseries created by Anna Winger and Daniel Hendler, based on the 2019 novel The Flight Portfolio by Julie Orringer. The novel explores the historic Emergency Rescue Committee that operated in Marseille (France), Spain, and Portugal in 1940 after the fall of France. The series includes or refers to well-known artists or scholars of the time who were saved by the Committee or interacted with it. The series closed the 2023 Series Mania festival in March, ahead of its Netflix premiere on 7 April 2023.

== Cast and characters ==
=== Main ===
- Gillian Jacobs as Mary Jayne Gold
- Lucas Englander as Albert Hirschman
- Cory Michael Smith as Varian Fry
- Ralph Amoussou as Paul Kandjo
- Deleila Piasko as Lisa Fittko
- Amit Rahav as Thomas Lovegrove
- Grégory Montel as Philippe Frot
- Corey Stoll as Graham Patterson

=== Recurring ===
- Moritz Bleibtreu as Walter Benjamin
- Alexander Fehling as Max Ernst
- Louis-Do de Lencquesaing as André Breton
- Hande Kodja as Jacqueline Lamba
- Jonas Nay as Walter Mehring
- Luke Thompson as Hiram "Harry" Bingham
- Jodhi May as Peggy Guggenheim
- Rafaela Nicolay as Margaux
- Birane Ba as Jacques "Petit" Kandjo
- Henriette Confurius as Lena Fischmann
- Lolita Chammah as Lorène Letoret
- Yoli Fuller as Souleymane Toure
- Nadiv Molcho as Bill Freier
- Morgane Ferru as Ursula Hirschmann
- Alexa Karolinski as Hannah Arendt
- Hanno Koffler as Hans Fittko
- Yulia Antoshchuk as Ukrainian Woman
- Ian Turiak as Wealthy Businessman
- Jakob Diehl as Hans Bellmer
- Piet Starrett as Doug Nugent

== Episodes ==
No.	Title	Directed by	Written by	Original release date
1	"Hiding Hand Principle"	Stéphanie Chuat & Véronique Reymond	Anna Winger & Daniel Hendler	April 7, 2023
In 1940 Marseille, France, American Emergency Rescue Committee operatives Mary Jayne Gold and Varian Fry attempt to help refugees escape Nazi Germany to the United States, but their efforts are hindered by the Vichy government. Meanwhile, predominantly Jewish refugees, including siblings Albert and Ursula Hirschman, seek passage to America despite lacking travel visas. After an initial escape attempt on a ship fails, the refugees are led by Lisa Fittko through the Pyrenees mountains and into Spain. Ursula continues to safety, but Albert and Lisa return to Marseille to inform Mary Jayne and Varian about the route. Mary Jayne's father cuts her off from the family fortune, jeopardizing the ERC's funding.
2	"The Angel of History"	Stéphanie Chuat & Véronique Reymond	Anna Winger & Daniel Hendler	April 7, 2023
The ERC's main lodgings, the Hotel Splendide, is raided by the police. Varian's old flame, Thomas Lovegrove, offers his country mansion, the Villa Air-Bel, as a safe haven. Lisa leads a group of refugees, including Walter Benjamin, through the mountains. Mary Jayne seduces American Consul Graham Patterson, hoping he will convince her father to reinstate her allowance. While in Spain, Benjamin dies by suicide. Vice-Consul Hiram Bingham informs Varian that anti-immigrant sentiment is growing in the US, making the ERC's work more difficult. Thomas introduces Mary Jayne to the mysterious Margaux, who will fund the ERC if Mary Jayne collaborates with British Intelligence.
3	"The Wilderness"	Stéphanie Chuat & Véronique Reymond	Anna Winger	April 7, 2023
Mary Jayne and Thomas assist Margaux's mission to get British POWs out of French prison. Commissaire Frot of the Marseille Police pressures Patterson to learn the whereabouts of the ERC's refugees. Hotel Splendide concierges and brothers from Ouidah, Paul and Petit, start a resistance cell. Albert is jealous that Mary Jayne slept with Patterson. Varian deals with a mix-up concerning Max Ernst's visa. Peggy Guggenheim visits the Villa, and Max throws himself a surrealist birthday party. Patterson witnesses Varian and Thomas kissing, leading him to message to the U.S. government questioning whether the ERC is acting in America's best interests.
4	"No Road Back"	Stéphanie Chuat & Véronique Reymond	Steve Bailie	April 7, 2023
A visit from Nazi officers to Marseille causes the local police to detain the ERC and refugees on the SS Sinaia. Mary Jayne tells Varian that she and Thomas are working with British Intelligence, which is treasonous to the neutral US. Captain DuBois of the Sinaia offers to smuggle refugees, but Varian hesitates to accept. Meanwhile, Albert attempts to get Walter Mehring out of Marseille, but Mehring must eventually return to the Villa Air-Bel. After being released, Varian and Mary Jayne learn that the Pyrenees route has been compromised because British POWs were caught carrying a map that Mary Jayne provided. Varian learns that President Franklin D. Roosevelt has won a third term in office.
5	"The Human Condition"	Mia Maariel Meyer	Isabel Teitler	April 7, 2023
Mary Jayne, Albert, and Paul conduct a prison break, freeing the British POWs and Lisa's husband, Hans Fittko, from Camp des Milles. In the chaos, Mary Jayne must leave behind her dog, Dagobert. Hannah Arendt pressures Varian to get her a visa to the US. Unfortunately, Varian has been dismissed from his post at the ERC. He consults Thomas on finding one's "compass" in a time of uncertainty. Varian convinces Vice-Consul Bingham to disobey orders and obtain travel documents for the refugees. Frot finds Dagobert and realizes Mary Jayne was behind the prison break.
6	"Pure Psychic Automatism"	Mia Maariel Meyer	Carey McKenzie & Anna Winger	April 7, 2023
After discovering the Villa has been bugged, Varian has 24 hours to fill DuBois' ship with refugees. Varian convinces Bingham to rapidly forge the necessary visas. Albert and Paul witness the Nazis deporting prisoners out of Marseille. Patterson discovers Paul's resistance cell. He informs the police and Paul is swiftly arrested. Patterson's secretary, Lorene Letoret, is a spy for the Gestapo, who bugged the Villa. 257 refugees escape to Martinique thanks to the ERC's hard work. Mary Jayne and Albert plan to marry and travel to the US.
7	"Fire in the Snow"	Mia Maariel Meyer	Tunde Aladese	April 7, 2023
Tensions rise as Germany exerts its influence on France and avenues of escape disappear. Marc and Bella Chagall, who previously refused to leave, finally agree to flee Marseille. Mary Jayne provides Albert, Petit, Lisa, and Hans with weapons so they can rescue Paul. The group intercepts a prison convoy, freeing Paul and others. However, Petit and a rabbi are killed during the rescue. Varian decides to accompany the Chagalls to the US, and Thomas sadly realizes he's leaving for good. Albert says goodbye to Mary Jayne as she leaves France and he stays to fight in the resistance.

== Production ==
=== Development ===
Transatlantic was the first project announced in September 2021 under the creative partnership of Netflix and Anna Winger's Berlin-based production company Studio Airlift. The seven-part series is created by Winger and Daniel Hendler, and produced by Winger and Camille McCurry. Stéphanie Chuat, Véronique Reymond and Mia Meyer led the directing team. In a March 2023 interview with Deadline Hollywood ahead of Transatlantic's Séries Mania screening, Winger said she took inspiration from the film Casablanca (1942).

=== Casting ===
Casting was reportedly under way as of January 2022. The cast were announced in March 2022, with Gillian Jacobs, Grégory Montel, Cory Michael Smith, and Corey Stoll set to star alongside Lucas Englander, Ralph Amoussou, Deleila Piasko, and Amit Rahav.

Moritz Bleibtreu, Alexander Fehling, Jonas Nay, Lolita Chammah, Luke Thompson, Jodhi May, Rafaela Nicolay and Henriette Confurius round out the cast.

=== Filming ===
Principal photography began on location in Marseille, France in February 2022.

Although the real Hôtel Splendide in Marseille is now used as administrative offices, producers were able to modify the environment and film on location at No. 31 Boulevard d'Athènes. The scenes depicting Villa Air-Bel were filmed at Château Mont Vallon outside the town of Vitrolles.

== Reception ==
On the review aggregator website Rotten Tomatoes, 94% of 18 critics' reviews are positive, with an average rating of 6.7/10. The website's consensus reads: "Ably dramatizing a deadly serious chapter of World War II history while also remembering to have fun, Transatlantic is a visually sumptuous throwback to classic Hollywood melodramas." Metacritic, which uses a weighted average, assigned the miniseries a score of 64 out of 100, based on 9 critics, indicating "generally favorable reviews". However, the series has been criticised for its historical inaccuracies.
