= The Death of Sherlock Holmes =

Upcoming television series

- Genre: Mystery; Historical drama
- Created by: Claudia Bluemhuber; André Küttel; Pierre Monnard
- Based on: Sherlock Holmes stories by Arthur Conan Doyle
- Showrunners: Claudia Bluemhuber; Pierre Monnard
- Written by: André Küttel; Simone Schmid
- Directed by: Pierre Monnard; Claudia Bluemhuber
- Starring: Rafe Spall; Deleila Piasko
- Countries of origin: Switzerland; Germany; Belgium
- Original language: English

Production
- Executive producers: Claudia Bluemhuber; Pierre Monnard; Florian Dargel; Alexander Jooss; Fabian Stein; Baptiste Planche; Bettina Alber; Jonathan Ford; Will Stapley
- Cinematography: Florian Emmerich
- Editors: Benjamin Fueter; Yasmin Joerg
- Running time: 43 minutes
- Production companies: Silver Reel; Sky Switzerland; SRF; ARD Degeto; Umedia

Original release
- Network: Sky Atlantic

The Death of Sherlock Holmes is an upcoming mystery television series based on Arthur Conan Doyle's Sherlock Holmes stories, specifically The Final Problem and The Adventure of the Empty House. The series is set to premiere on Sky Atlantic in 2027.

== Premise ==
Set in Switzerland, 1891, the series follows on from Sherlock Holmes' famous battle to the death with master criminal Professor Moriarty at the Reichenbach Falls, from which both are thought to have perished. Near the Swiss Alps, a weak and amnesia-riddled Holmes is found and taken in by local villager Alma. When her young child Franz is accused of killing the town doctor, a crime that begins to hint at a deeper mystery, Holmes uses his still-impeccable deductive skills to both unravel the conspiracy and unearth his lost memories.

The plot takes narrative cues from the short stories The Final Problem and The Empty House, wherein following his presumed demise at Reichenbach, Holmes goes into hiding and journeys incognito through several countries before publicly resurfacing in London three years later, having defeated the remnants of Moriarty's organisation. The series will explore the detective's travels during that period.

== Cast and characters ==
- Rafe Spall as The Englishman
- Deleila Piasko as Alma Kohler
- Thomas Kaschel as Dr. John H. Watson
- Christian Koerner as Mycroft Holmes
- Timothy Innes as Edward Pembroke
- Dominic Geissbühler
- Rick Okon
- Marie Leuenberger
- Mike Müller
- Marcus Signer
- Susanne Kunz
- Dimitri Stapfer
- Jeanette Hain
- Michael Neuenschwander

== Production ==
The project was first announced in February 2026 as a collaboration between SRF and Sky Switzerland. Silver Reel, ARD Degeto, and Umedia later joined to co-produce.

By May, filming of the series had commenced, with Rafe Spall cast as Holmes and Deleila Piasko co-starring as Alma. The cast will also feature Bernese musician Dominic Geissbühler, better known as "Edb", in his acting debut.

Shooting has taken place at Valais, Bavaria, and South Tyrol. In the latter country, specific filming locations include the St. Anna Pfistradalm, the Parcines waterfall, and St. Valentin auf der Haide. Filming concluded in Regensburg in early August. The series will consist of six 43-minute episodes.

== Release ==
The Death of Sherlock Holmes is set to premiere in early 2027 on Sky Atlantic and will also be released on the streaming service NOW in the United Kingdom, Ireland, Germany, and Switzerland. An alternative Swiss release will be covered by SRF, with ARD Degeto doing likewise for Germany, and Sphere Abacus distributing the show globally.
