= Grégory Montel =

French actor

Grégory Montel (born 20 September 1976) is a French actor.

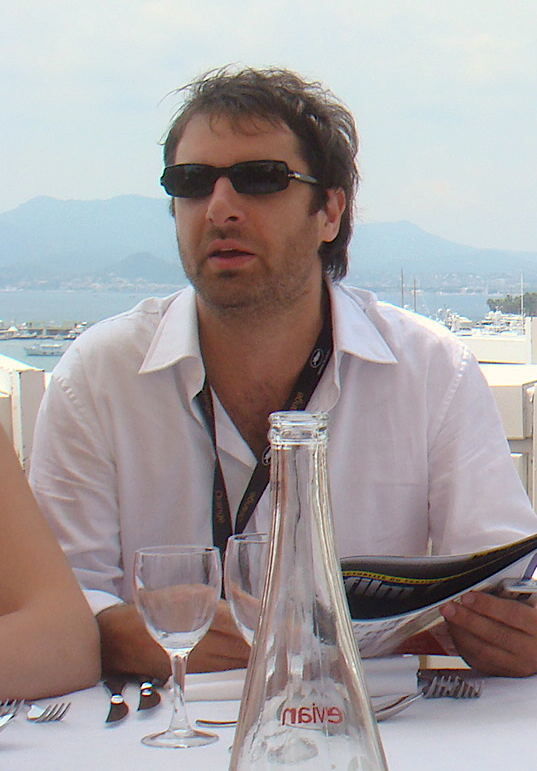
Grégory Montel at the Festival de Cannes in 2008

== Early life ==
From Digne-les-Bains, in the Alpes-de-Haute-Provence.

== Career ==
In 2013, his role in L'air de rien as Michel Delpech earned him a Cesar Award long-list nomination for Most Promising Actor.

Beginning in 2015 Grégory Montel played the character of bourgeois bohème agent Gabriel Sarda in long running series Call My Agent!. In 2021 he appeared in Rebecca, alongside his Call My Agent! co-star Anne Marivin. It was a French adaptation of the British-Nordic series Marcella. In 2022 he appeared in a four-part limited series alongside Josh Hartnett called The Fear Index.

In 2023 he could be seen in the Netflix series Transatlantic concerning the real-life story of the French Resistance helping refugees flee Vichy France.

Montel appears in Upgraded alongside Camila Mendes, Marisa Tomei and Saoirse-Monica Jackson.

== Personal life ==
Montel began a relationship with French actress Marine Danaux in 2008 after meeting in Parisian theatre. They have two children, both boys.

== Partial filmography ==
Key
†	Denotes works that have not yet been released

Year	Title	Role	Notes
2013	L'air de rien	Michel	Feature film. Nominated for Most Promising Actor at the César Awards
2015–2020	Call My Agent!	Gabriel	24 episodes
2019	Perfumes	Guillaume Favre	Film. French comedy Les Parfums
2021–2022	Rebecca	Henri	16 episodes
2022	The Fear Index	Jean-Phillipe Leclerc	4 episodes
2023	Transatlantic	Phillipe	7 episodes
2024	Upgraded	Gerard	Feature film
2024	The Killer	Jax	Feature film
2027	Clutch †	Ludo Martial	Video game
