= Claudia Bluemhuber =

German film and television producer

- Born: September 1969 (age 56); Germany
- Occupations: Producer, showrunner, director

Claudia Bluemhuber (born September 1969) is a German film and television producer, based in Switzerland. She is the co-founder, CEO, and managing partner of Silver Reel, a film and television production company formed in 2009.

Many of Bluemhuber and Silver Reel's productions have received critical acclaim and been nominated for, and won, several major awards. The 2017 films The Wife and Loving Vincent were both nominated for Academy Awards, with the former winning a Golden Globe. In 2025, the series Fallen, which Bluemhuber co-created and directed, won an International Emmy Award.

Bluemhuber is the co-creator of the upcoming series The Death of Sherlock Holmes, for which she will also direct.

== Filmography ==
=== Film ===
Year	Title	Credited as		
Year	Title	Producer	Executive producer	Notes
2010	Patagonia	No	Yes	
2011	Hysteria	No	Yes	
2011	The Great Ghost Rescue	No	Yes	
2013	The Host	No	Yes	
2013	Getaway	No	Yes	
2013	Under the Skin	No	Yes	
2013	The Railway Man	No	Yes	
2014	Grace of Monaco	No	Yes	
2015	Z for Zachariah	No	Yes	
2015	Maggie	No	Yes	
2015	Solace	Yes	No	
2015	Eye in the Sky	No	Yes	
2016	A Hologram for the King	No	Yes	
2016	The Exception	No	Yes	
2016	Fallen	Yes	No	
2017	Unlocked	Yes	No	
2017	Churchill	Yes	No	
2017	Deep	No	Yes	
2017	Loving Vincent	No	Yes	
2017	Breathe	No	Yes	
2017	The Wife	Yes	No	
2018	Every Day	No	Yes	
2018	Amá	No	Yes	Documentary
2018	Intrigo: Death of an Author	No	Yes	
2019	Official Secrets	No	Yes	
2019	Ibiza: The Silent Movie	No	Yes	Documentary
2019	Horrible Histories: The Movie – Rotten Romans	No	Yes	
2019	Intrigo: Dear Agnes	No	Yes	
2019	Intrigo: Samaria	No	Yes	
2019	Ride Like a Girl	No	Yes	
2021	SAS: Red Notice	No	Yes	
2022	Shattered	Yes	No	
2022	Paradise Highway	Yes	No	
2024	Robin and the Hoods	Yes	No	

=== Television ===
Year	Title	Credited as				
Year	Title	Producer	Executive producer	Creator	Director	Notes
2010	Nur die Sterne schauten zu	Yes	No	No	No	1 episode
2020	The Luminaries	No	Yes	No	No	6 episodes
2024	Fallen	No	Yes	Yes	Yes	Showrunner, directed 2 episodes
2027	The Death of Sherlock Holmes	Yes	No	Yes	Yes	Showrunner
