= Perfumes (film) =

2019 French comedy film

- Film poster
- French: Les Parfums
- Directed by: Grégory Magne
- Produced by: Frédéric Jouve
- Starring: Grégory Montel, Emmanuelle Devos, Gustave Kervern, Sergi López, Zélie Rixhon, Pauline Moulène.
- Cinematography: Thomas Rames
- Music by: Gaëtan Roussel
- Distributed by: Les Films Velvet, co-production France 3 Cinéma
- Release dates: September 2019 (Saint-Jean-de-Luz); July 1, 2020 (France)
- Running time: 100 minutes
- Country: France
- Language: French

Perfumes (French: Les Parfums) is a 2019 French comedy film directed by Grégory Magne. The film premiered at the 2019 Saint-Jean-de-Luz International Film Festival and released in France in July 2020.

== Plot ==
A divorced father, Guillaume Favre (Grégory Montel) is desperate to get shared custody of his daughter. He needs to keep his job as a chauffeur to pay for somewhere better to live, with room for his daughter. He is assigned a new client: a gifted perfumer Anne Walberg (Emmanuelle Devos) whose skills at constructing and identifying scents are matched by her egotism, poor treatment of her drivers, and lack of tact. Unlike most people, Guillaume stands up to Anne, and she requests him to be her sole driver as she lands a series of jobs requiring her skills across France, including the capturing of scents in a replication of a Paleolithic cave site in southern France, and blending new scents to mask an objectionable odour delaying the marketing of a new range of luxury handbags (where Guillaume intervenes to double her fee if she can overcome the problem in only 7 days). In a restaurant together during one of these trips, Anne identifies the five major components of the waitress's perfume (J'Adore) as she passes. Guillaume is staggered with her skill, and she confides that it is because she "invented that scent". Anne lives alone craves more social contact. She attends her agent's party but leaves on bad terms with her, later firing her. She uncharacteristically spends a night in a bar and returns to her hotel drunk, but is awoken in the morning with no sense of smell. She confides in Guillaume that this has happened once before. Four years ago she had a stressful high-profile job designing three perfumes for a major company in the US, and trying to bluff her way through with no sense of smell, the third one was a failure with an unacceptable scent - this has ruined her reputation in that industry.

Guillaume has to assist her in identifying an odour when she is called in to help factory owners in Alsace, whose plant emits noxious odours, creating protest from local residents. But, overcome by her loss of sense of smell, she takes sleeping pills in Guillaume's car on the return journey to Paris, and he speeds her to hospital at 180 km/h, saving her life but getting points on his licence that disqualify him from driving. She is aided in hospital by Professor Patrick Ballester (Sergi López), specialising in olfactory problems - Guillaume had called him - and returns home. Missing Guillaume, she finds his chauffeur agency and talks with his employer, who has found him a dead-end job riding a sit-on lawnmower at an airfield. She confronts Guillaume - who has confided in his daughter that he will now not be able to afford a larger apartment - and he agrees to become her agent as she continues to work with a returning sense of smell, and wants to re-enter the perfume industry that spurned her. He also finds a solution to the factory owner's problem - the smell of mown grass, something he remembers from childhood. Anne concurs and off-camera, works on a solution for the owners. Guillaume uses his new job to return to the custody tribunal, having secured his apartment, and gains joint custody of his daughter. The film ends with the two main characters entering Dior headquarters to pitch new perfumes.

== Reception ==
The film was generally well received in France. Tomris Laffly for Variety stated "this is a film that chooses to keep things crisp and feather-light. And there is nothing wrong with the movie equivalent of a modestly happy floral cologne you’d splash on for a little daytime pick-me-up." On review aggregator website Rotten Tomatoes, the film holds an approval rating of 100% based on 24 reviews, with an average rating of 7.0/10.
