= Camila Mendes =

American actress (born 1994)

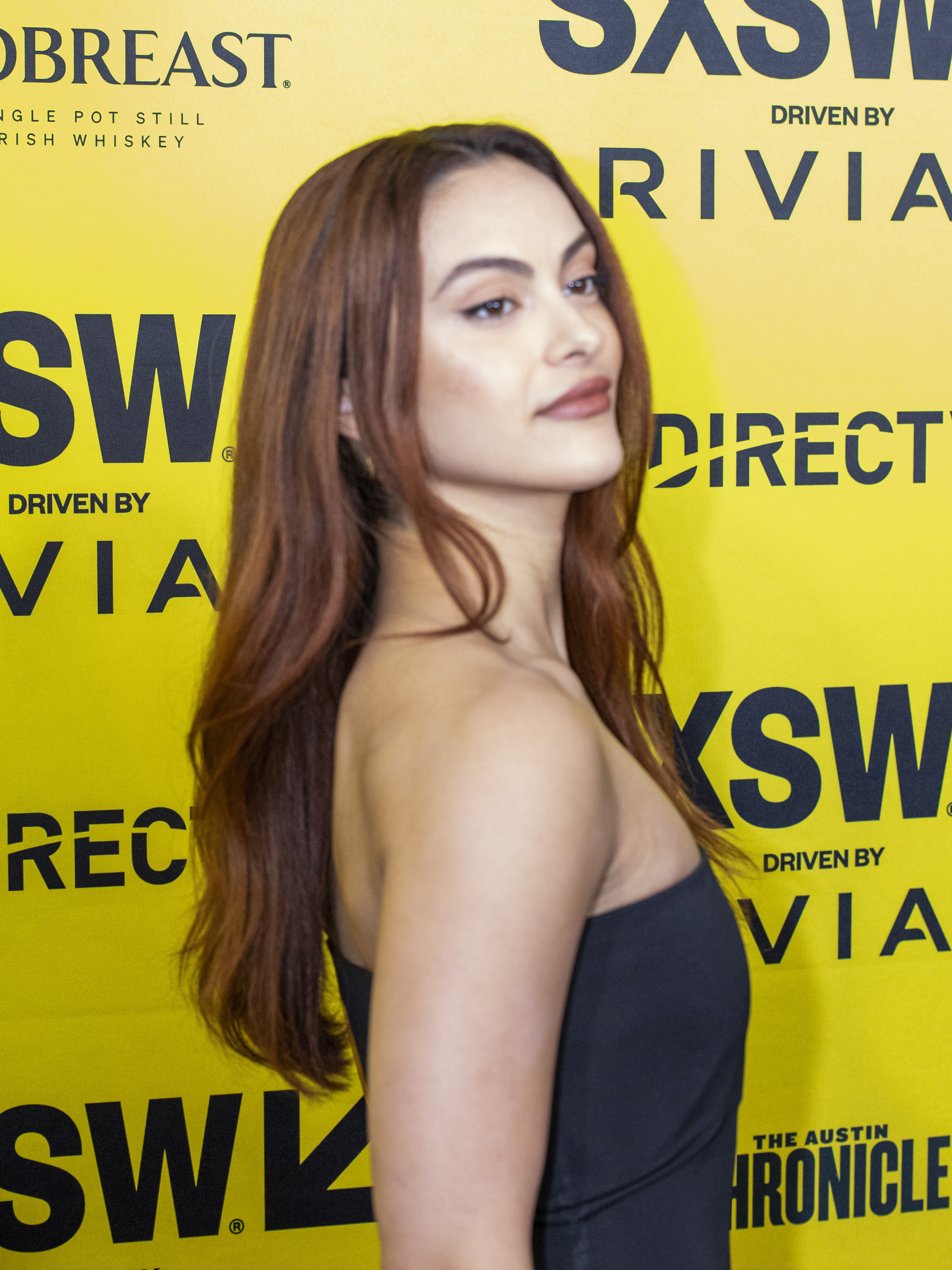
- Mendes in 2025
- Born: Camila Carraro Mendes; June 29, 1994 (age 32); Charlottesville, Virginia, U.S.
- Education: New York University (BFA)
- Occupations: Actress; producer
- Years active: 2017–present
- Partner(s): Rudy Mancuso (2022–present, engaged)

Camila Carraro Mendes (/kəˈmiːlə ˈmɛndɛz/; Brazilian Portuguese: [ˈmẽdʒis]; born June 29, 1994) is an American actress and producer. She made her acting debut portraying Veronica Lodge on The CW teen drama series Riverdale (2017–2023), for which she won a Teen Choice Award in 2017.

Mendes transitioned her career to film, taking on supporting roles in The New Romantic (2018), The Perfect Date (2019), and Palm Springs (2020). She has since played leading roles in the crime thriller film Coyote Lake (2019), black comedy film Do Revenge (2022), the romantic comedies Upgraded (2024), Música (2024), and the sword-and-sorcery film Masters of the Universe (2026).

== Early life ==
Mendes was born on June 29, 1994, in Charlottesville, Virginia, to Brazilian parents. Her father is a business executive and her mother is a flight attendant. She has an older sister. Shortly after her birth, the family moved to Atlanta, Georgia, then back to Virginia, and then to Orlando, Florida. Due to her father's job and later her parents' divorce, Mendes moved 16 times across the Southern United States growing up, but lived mainly in Florida. At the age of 10, she lived in Brazil for a year. Mendes attended the Fine Arts program at the American Heritage School in Plantation, Florida, graduating in 2012. In May 2016, Mendes graduated from New York University Tisch School of the Arts.

== Career ==
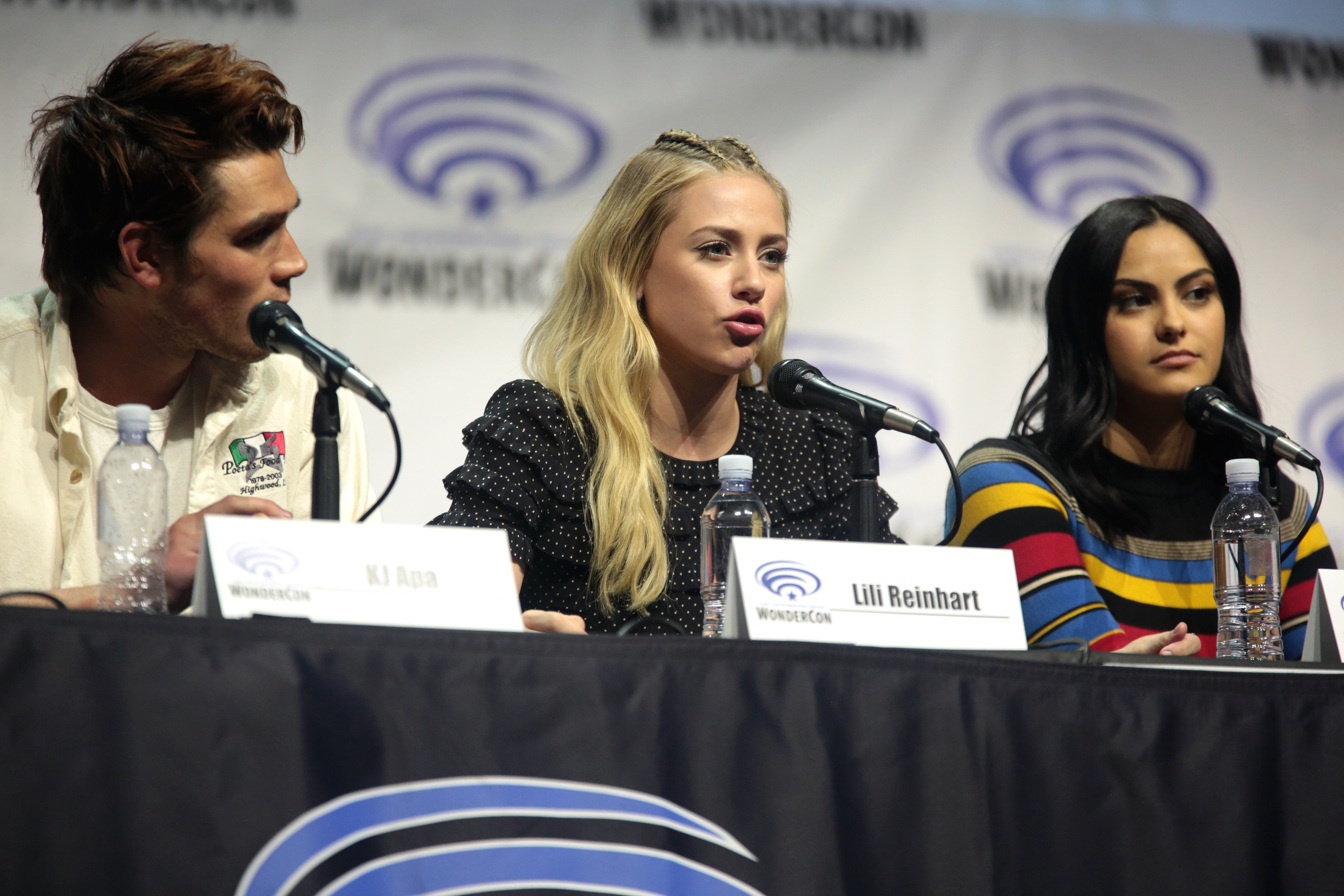
KJ Apa, Lili Reinhart and Mendes at the WonderCon in 2017

Mendes's first acting job was a commercial for IKEA. In 2016, Mendes was cast as "silver-tongued high school sophomore" Veronica Lodge in The CW's teen drama series Riverdale (2017–2023), a subversive take on the Archie Comics. For her performance, she won the Teen Choice Award for Choice Scene Stealer in 2017. Mendes was represented by the Carson Kolker Organization, later changing to CAA.

Mendes made her feature film debut as Morgan in The New Romantic, which premiered at the SXSW Festival in March 2018. In the same month, Mendes joined the cast of the romantic comedy The Perfect Date. The film was released on Netflix on April 12, 2019. In 2019, the film Coyote Lake premiered, in which Mendes is the lead. In 2020, she appeared in the critically acclaimed sci-fi/comedy Palm Springs, which premiered at the Sundance Film Festival and was released that July on Hulu. She subsequently headlined the Netflix thriller film Dangerous Lies, released that same year.

In 2022, she co-starred opposite Maya Hawke in the teen black comedy Do Revenge for Netflix, earning critical acclaim. Mendes played Drea, a popular student at an elite high school trying to get revenge on her ex-boyfriend. Adrian Horton of The Guardian praised her performance writing, "In particular, Mendes's six years on Riverdale have refined her performance of a popular bitch with secret vulnerability to a fine, relishable point." In February 2024, Mendes starred as Ana Santos, an ambitious art world intern in the Amazon Prime romantic comedy film Upgraded. The film also starred Archie Renaux, Lena Olin, and Marisa Tomei. The film earned positive reviews with Courtney Howard of Variety describing this film as a "clever and charming romantic comedy" adding "Mendes and Renaux make for a lovely on-screen duo, teasing out lighthearted tenderness within the witty banter." That same year, she starred in another Amazon romantic comedy, Música, which premiered at the SXSW Festival. Rafael Motamyer of IndieWire praised the film for its "subversion of the musical comedy", adding the film is "charming" while also praising the chemistry of the two leads.

In June 2024, Mendes co-founded the production company Honor Role with Rachel Matthews.

In July 2024, Mendes was cast in the reboot of I Know What You Did Last Summer. In August 2024, it was announced that she had been cast as Teela in the live-action film reboot of Masters of the Universe, co-starring with Nicholas Galitzine as He-Man, leading her to drop out of the former due to scheduling conflicts.

In February 2026, it was announced that Honor Role hired Meredith Ditlow (from Reese Witherspoon's Hello Sunshine) to run film and television for Honor Role.

== Personal life ==
When auditioning for characters of Latin American background, she has been told, "You don't look Latina enough." Mendes is Brazilian American and identifies as Latin American. She speaks Portuguese.

"I really appreciate how these two cultures created who I am. I am a Brazilian of blood, with all the extended family of Brazilians, but I was born and raised in the United States. When I go to Brazil, I feel like an American, and in the United States, I always realize the traits that make me Brazilian."

— Camila Mendes, in an interview with People Magazine.

Mendes was drugged and sexually assaulted when she was a freshman at NYU, which inspired her to get a tattoo that says "to build a home" in cursive lettering above her rib, representing her commitment to build stability and safety for herself.

Mendes dated photographer and director Ian Wallace from 2013 to 2017. Mendes had begun dating Riverdale co-star Charles Melton by October 2018; they broke up by December 2019. In July 2023, she revealed that she has been dating actor and internet personality Rudy Mancuso for a year whom she met while working on Música. They became engaged on October 24, 2025.

== Filmography ==
Key
†	Denotes works that have not yet been released

=== Film ===
Year	Title	Role	Notes	Ref.
2018	The New Romantic	Morgan Cruise		
2019	The Perfect Date	Shelby Pace		
2019	Coyote Lake	Ester		
2020	Palm Springs	Tala Ann Wilder		
2020	Dangerous Lies	Katie Franklin		
2022	Do Revenge	Drea Torres		
2024	Upgraded	Ana Santos	Also executive producer	
2024	Música	Isabella	Also executive producer	
2024	Griffin in Summer	—N/a	Also producer	
2025	Idiotka	Nicol Garcia	Also producer	
2026	Masters of the Universe	Teela		
2026	Baton	TBA	Post-production	
TBA	DED	Flora	Post-production; also producer	
TBA	Viva La Madness	TBA	Post-production	
TBA	Untitled sequel to Upgraded	Ana Santos	Filming; also producer	

=== Television ===
Year	Title	Role	Notes	Ref.
2017–2023	Riverdale	Veronica Lodge	Main role; 137 episodes	
2020	Day by Day	Grace	Voice; episode: "Fallin' Rain"	
2020	The Simpsons	Tessa Rose	Voice; episode: "The Hateful Eight-Year-Olds"	
2020	Dear Class of 2020	Herself	Television special	
2020	Celebrity Substitute	Herself	Web series	
2021–2022	Fairfax	Melody	Voice; recurring role	

=== Music videos ===
Year	Title	Artist(s)	Role	Ref.
2018	"Give a Little"	Maggie Rogers	Dancer	
2018	"Side Effects"	The Chainsmokers featuring Emily Warren	Riley	
2026	"Do Me Right"	Mr. Fantasy	Herself	

== Awards and nominations ==
Year	Award	Category	Nominated work	Result	Ref.
2017	Teen Choice Awards	Choice Scene Stealer	Riverdale	Won	
2018	MTV Movie & TV Awards	Best Kiss (with KJ Apa)	Riverdale	Nominated	
2018	People's Choice Awards	Female TV Star of 2018	Riverdale	Nominated	
2018	Teen Choice Awards	Choice TV Actress Drama	Riverdale	Nominated	
2018	Teen Choice Awards	Choice TV Ship (with KJ Apa)	Riverdale	Nominated	
2019	Teen Choice Awards	Choice TV Actress Drama	Riverdale	Nominated	
2026	Critics' Choice Super Awards	Best Actress in a Superhero Movie	Masters of the Universe	Nominated	
