= Jonathan Halperyn =

American film producer and director

- Education: NYU Stern School of Business
- Occupations: Producer, directoor
- Years active: 2017–present
- Organization: Hero Squared Production
- Known for: Infinity Pool

Jonathan Halperyn is an American film producer and director based in Budapest, Hungary. He is the founder of Hero Squared Productions, a film and television production company based in Budapest.

== Biography ==
Halperyn's career in the entertainment industry began in 2002 when he worked in the mailroom at Miramax and Fox Searchlight. In 2003, he joined Focus Features, where he worked for twelve years, eventually becoming Managing Director of Focus Features International. He was involved with films such as Lost in Translation, Eternal Sunshine of the Spotless Mind and Brokeback Mountain. In 2018, Halperyn founded Hero Squared Productions in Budapest. Alongside Daniel Kresmery, he expanded the company to provide production services across Hungary, Croatia and the Central and Eastern Europe region.

Halperyn's producing credits include Infinity Pool (2023), Mrs. Harris Goes to Paris (2022), The Lair (2022), Blade of the 47 Ronin (2022), River Wild (2023) and Archive (2020).

== Filmography ==
=== Film ===
- Oxana - Producer
- Infinity Pool - Producer
- Dust Bunny – Co-Producer
- Chief of Station – Producer
- The Pigeon Tunnel – Co-Producer (Hungary)
- River Wild – Co-Producer
- The Munsters – Co-Producer
- Blade of the 47 Ronin – Co-Producer
- Knights of the Zodiac – Co-Producer
- Mrs. Harris Goes to Paris – Co-Producer
- SAS: Red Notice – Co-Producer (Hungary)
- Archive – Co-Producer
- RIPD 2 – Co-Producer

=== Television ===
- The Pendragon Cycle: Rise of the Merlin - Producer
- Ransom – Executive Producer, Season 2
- Fallen - Producer
- Love on the Right Course - Producer
