= Clutch (video game) =

Upcoming video game

- Developer: Maverick Games
- Publisher: Focus Entertainment
- Director: Mike Brown
- Writer: Jamie Brittain
- Composer: Dave Fox
- Engine: Unreal Engine 5
- Platforms: PlayStation 5; Windows; Xbox Series X/S
- Release: Early 2027
- Genre: Racing
- Modes: Single-player, multiplayer

Clutch is an upcoming racing video game developed by Maverick Games and published by Focus Entertainment. It is set to be released for PlayStation 5, Windows, and Xbox Series X/S in 2027.

== Gameplay ==
Clutch is an open-world racing video game set in Monaco and the French Riviera. The game follows two siblings named Theo and Cass Martial competing against rival drivers in both the prestigious R1K professional circuit and an underground racing club known as the Midnight Collective. Vehicles, both its interior and exterior, can be customized extensively in the game. Maverick Games described the game's world as a PvPvE environment where players can complete handcrafted missions and encounter emergent gameplay events.

== Development ==
Clutch is currently being developed by Maverick Games, which was founded by Mike Brown, the director of Forza Horizon 5, in December 2022. Brown left Playground Games because he wanted to pursue a project with a different direction from the Forza Horizon series. He was also joined by several former Playground Games employees, and the team at Maverick Games had about 140 people. The studio signed a publishing agreement with Amazon Game Studios in May 2024, though it left the project in February 2026. In August 2026, it was announced that Focus Entertainment would be publishing the project.

According to the studio, the game's version of Monaco is slightly larger than its real-life counterpart. The surrounding French Riviera will include locations like the Alps and the Verdon Gorge, alongside city hubs such as Cannes and Saint-Tropez. Maverick Games described the project as a "cinematic" racing game, with Brown adding that the studio's goal was to "set the tone for car culture across the next decade". The game's story was written by Jamie Brittain, and its voice cast includes Jane Perry, Peter Serafinowicz, Tosin Cole, Little Simz, and Grégory Montel. Clutch was built using Unreal Engine 5 and features a dynamic degradation system that reflects vehicle wear and tear based on how aggressively players drive.
