= Coyote Lake (film) =

2019 film directed and written by Sara Seligman

- Directed by: Sara Seligman
- Written by: Sara Seligman
- Produced by: Nikki Stier Justice; Van Johnson; Anne Clements; Ash Christian
- Starring: Camila Mendes; Charlie Weber; Adriana Barraza; Neil Sandilands; Manny Pérez
- Music by: Fabrizio Mancinelli
- Release date: 2 August 2019 (United States)
- Running time: 93 minutes
- Country: United States
- Languages: English and Spanish

Coyote Lake is a 2019 American independent neo-Western psychological thriller film written and directed by Sara Seligman. Her feature length film debut, Seligman took inspiration for her screenplay from an actual unsolved disappearance of a Texas resident that occurred in 2010 on the Falcon International Reservoir along the Mexico–United States border, when he was attacked by pirates after washing ashore in the Mexican side of the lake on his jet ski.

The film is produced by Nikki Stier Justice, Van Johnson, Anne Clements, and Ash Christian under the banner of Cranked Up Films, and Van Johnson Company. The film stars Camila Mendes, Charlie Weber, Adriana Barraza, Neil Sandilands, and Manny Pérez. The film was scheduled to release on 2 August 2019.

The movie revolves around a woman and her daughter. They live in a deserted guest house. Drugging guests and killing them seems to be the order of the day for them. Two drug dealers emerge and change the daughter’s perception about life. The daughter finally gets courage to escape the best way she knows how.

== Cast ==
- Camila Mendes as Ester
- Charlie Weber as Mario
- Adriana Barraza as Teresa
- Neil Sandilands as Dirk
- Manny Perez as Ignacio
- Andres Velez as Paco

== Reception ==
=== Critical response ===
Rotten Tomatoes gives Coyote Lake an approval rating of 83%.

Steve Davis of The Austin Chronicle wrote, "The exquisitely precise direction by Seligman (making an impressive debut here), the trim editing by Eric F. Martin, the gorgeous nighttime cinematography by Matthias Schubert – all contribute to an eerie otherworldliness in this beautifully executed opening sequence of Coyote Lake". Frank Scheck of The Hollywood Reporter wrote, "The film is carried along by the strength of Mendes' emotionally complex, restrained performance that makes clear that Ester is as much victim as accomplice".
