= Julie Orringer =

American novelist (born 1973)

- Born: June 12, 1973 (age 53)
- Education: Cornell University (BA); Iowa Writers' Workshop (MFA)
- Occupations: Novelist; short story writer; professor
- Spouse: Ryan Harty
- Website: julieorringer.com

Julie Orringer (born June 12, 1973) is an American novelist, short story writer, and professor. She attended Cornell University and the Iowa Writer's Workshop, and was a Stegner Fellow at Stanford University. She was born in Miami, Florida and now lives in Brooklyn with her husband, fellow writer Ryan Harty. She is the author of The Invisible Bridge, a New York Times bestseller, and How to Breathe Underwater, a collection of stories; her novel, The Flight Portfolio, tells the story of Varian Fry, the New York journalist who went to Marseille in 1940 to save writers and artists blacklisted by the Gestapo. The novel inspired the Netflix series Transatlantic. In 2026 she published the novel Luna, Phoenix, Queen.

== Career ==
Julie Orringer received her BA in English from Cornell University and her MFA in Fiction from the Iowa Writers' Workshop. She is the winner of the Paris Review's Plimpton Prize and has received fellowships from the Guggenheim Foundation, the National Endowment for the Arts, the Cullman Center at the New York Public Library, the Radcliffe Institute for Advanced Study at Harvard, the MacDowell Colony, and Yaddo. She teaches Fiction at New York University and the Stanford University Stanford in New York Program. In the past she has also taught at Brooklyn College, Columbia University, Princeton University, NYU, University of Michigan, St. Mary's College, California College of the Arts, and Stanford University.

Her stories have appeared in numerous anthologies, including The Granta Book of the American Short Story and The Scribner Anthology of American Short Fiction, as well as The Paris Review, McSweeney's, Ploughshares, Zoetrope: All-Story, The Pushcart Prize Anthology, The Best New American Voices, and The Best American Non-Required Reading.

She received the Paris Review's Discovery Prize, two Pushcart Prizes, The Yale Review Editors' Prize, Ploughshares' Cohen Award, the Northern California Book Award, and the Anne and Robert Cowan Award from the Jewish Community Endowment Fund. She was the recipient of a 2004–5 NEA grant for The Invisible Bridge. The novel is based on the experiences of her family in the Holocaust and World War 2, including her grand-uncle Alfred Tibor, who later became a well-known sculptor.

== Literary works ==
Orringer has written several books, all published by Alfred A. Knopf.

In 2003, she published How to Breathe Underwater: Stories, a collection of nine short stories. Many of the stories are about characters submerged by loss, whether of parents or lovers or a viable relationship to the world in general. In "Pilgrims," a band of motherless children torment each other on Thanksgiving day. In "The Isabel Fish," the sole survivor of a drowning accident takes up scuba diving. In "When She is Old and I am Famous," a young woman confronts the inscrutable power of her cousin's beauty. In "The Smoothest Way is Full of Stones," the failure of religious and moral codes—to protect, to comfort, to offer solace—is seen through the eyes of a group of Orthodox Jewish adolescents discovering the irresistible power of their sexuality. How to Breathe Underwater is a New York Times Notable Book, a San Francisco Chronicle Best Book of the Year, and the winner of the Northern California Book Award and Cowan Writers’ Award, Jewish Community Endowment (2006).

Orringer's first novel, The Invisible Bridge, was the winner of the Wallant Award (University of Hartford, 2010), and named a finalist for the James Tait Black Prize (University of Edinburgh, 2011), Orange Prize (2011), Sami Rohr Prize (2011), and the First Novel Prize, Center for Fiction, New York (2010). The Invisible Bridge is the story of a young Hungarian-Jewish student who leaves Budapest in 1937 to study architecture in Paris. There he meets and falls in love with a ballet teacher. The student and ballet teacher are then caught up in the Second World War with their families and struggle to survive. It was a New York Times Notable Book (2010) and named a Best Book of 2010 by The San Francisco Chronicle, Boston Globe, The Washington Post, and Entertainment Weekly.

The Flight Portfolio is a 2019 novel based on the true story of Varian Fry, an American journalist who, in 1940, went to occupied Europe to help rescue Jewish artists fleeing the Holocaust. It received the Association of Jewish Libraries Award (2020), and was named a finalist for the American Library in Paris Book Award (2019). The novel also inspired the 2023 Netflix series Transatlantic.

In 2026 she published the novel Luna, Phoenix, Queen.
