= Falling (2026 film) =

- Theatrical release poster
- Directed by: Colin Krisel; James Krisel
- Written by: Colin Krisel; James Krisel
- Produced by: Mike Karz; William Bindley; Lena Roklin; Matt Luber; Piers Tempest
- Starring: KJ Apa; Isabel May; Archie Renaux; Emma Laird; Alex Jarrett
- Cinematography: Mike Stern Sterzynski
- Edited by: Mark Thornton
- Music by: Will Bloomfield
- Production companies: Gulfstream Pictures; Luber Roklin Entertainment; Tempo Productions; Clerendon Road Productions
- Distributed by: Brainstorm Media (United States); Signature Entertainment (United Kingdom)
- Release date: October 9, 2026
- Running time: 107 minutes
- Countries: United Kingdom; United States
- Language: English

Falling is a 2026 romantic comedy film directed and written by Colin and James Krisel. The film follows Jack, who is caught in a love triangle when he is smitten over Jillian, unaware that his best friend Johnny also harbors feelings for her.

The film was released in the United States on October 9, 2026.

== Cast ==
- Isabel May as Jillian
- Emma Laird
- Sophie Simnett as Veronica
- KJ Apa as Jack
- Archie Renaux as Johnny
- Nick Hendrix as Wheels
- Will Close as Tim
- Alex Jarrett
- Hana Mai as Cynthia
- Maria Chiara Cavallina as herself/Sofia
- Amy Vasiliki as a woman who is Jack's girlfriend

== Production ==
In June 2024, KJ Apa was added to the cast of the film, directed by Colin Krisel and James Krisel and produced by Mike Karz and Bill Bindley of Gulstream Pictures and Piers Tempest of Tempo Productions, with principal photography beginning in the United Kingdom. Apa served as an executive producer, along with Tom Salentine, Dakota Rosen, and Mary Vernieu. In July, Isabel May, Archie Renaux, Emma Laird, and Alex Jarrett have rounded out the cast.

== Release ==
The film was originally screened for distributors at the TIFF Lightbox on September 4, 2025. In November 2025, The Exchange and Voltage Pictures acquired the international sales to the film at the American Film Market. The film was released in the United States by Brainstorm Media in select theaters on October 9, 2026, before a digital release on November 10.
