= Upgraded (film) =

2024 film by Carlson Young

- Release poster
- Directed by: Carlson Young
- Written by: Christine Lenig; Justin Matthews; Luke Spencer Roberts
- Produced by: Mike Karz; William Bindley; Lena Roklin; Piers Tempest
- Starring: Camila Mendes; Archie Renaux; Thomas Kretschmann; Grégory Montel; Lena Olin; Marisa Tomei
- Cinematography: Mike Stern Sterzynski
- Edited by: Bruce Green
- Music by: Isom Innis
- Production company: Gulfstream Pictures
- Distributed by: Amazon MGM Studios (via Amazon Prime Video)
- Release date: February 9, 2024
- Running time: 104 minutes
- Country: United States
- Language: English

Upgraded is a 2024 American romantic comedy film directed by Carlson Young and starring Camila Mendes, Archie Renaux, Thomas Kretschmann, Grégory Montel, Lena Olin and Marisa Tomei. The film is a modern-day retelling of the classic fairytale "Cinderella" and focuses on Ana Santos, an ignored-but-ambitious intern in the New York art world whose life and career change when by happenstance she is upgraded to first class on a flight to London.

It was released on Amazon Prime Video on February 9, 2024.

== Plot ==
Ana is an ambitious intern, dreaming of a career in art while trying to impress her demanding boss, Claire. Due to the high cost of living in NYC, Ana lives with her sister Vivian and Vivian's fiancé Ronnie, who has been urging her to move out. After noticing a typo during an art auction and alerting her boss to the error, she is invited on a work trip to London as an assistant's assistant.

Claire's assistants, Suzette and Renee, make numerous attempts to sabotage Ana. However, the employee at the check-in desk upgrades Ana to first-class when she sees the assistants' bullying. She meets young and wealthy William at the airport, when she accidentally spills a drink on him. Ana inadvertently misleads William into believing she is the art director of her company's New York office. Impressed, he introduces her to his mother, Catherine, a British celebrity.

Ana ends up at Catherine's to recover her laptop which she left behind in her car, and finds herself in the middle of a party. There, she sees Catherine's extensive art collection, meets a famous painter, and continues to let them believe she is the director of a New York auction house.

She grows closer to William and Catherine. Through their connections, Ana gets Claire last-minute tickets to a performance of Shakespeare's A Midsummer Night's Dream. This impresses her, who is currently facing tension with Gerard, the art director for the Paris office, as they vie for the same position.

Ana attends a party with William and Catherine in a designer dress she "borrowed" from Claire. When Claire arrives unexpectedly with Suzette and Renee, Ana leaves abruptly. William catches her outside and takes her out dancing. At the end of the night, Ana, embarrassed by her hotel, has William drop her off at Claire's much nicer one. Before leaving, William confesses that he is falling in love with her.

Over the next week, Ana and William continue to spend time together, growing closer. As he knows her job is important, he hopes his plan to transfer his work to New York is successful, so they can continue their relationship.

Claire praises Ana's hard work at the office and promises her a future promotion. Renee interrupts their meeting to reveal that a major client has just pulled out of their upcoming auction. That client is Catherine, and at that exact moment, William arrives to surprise Ana at work. She rushes him out of the building. William is suspicious of her behavior and tells her he has nothing to do with his mother's decision. He questions whether Ana was using him to secure his mother's sale and breaks up with her. Ana is confronted by Claire, who has discovered her lie and her relationship with William's family. She is fired and escorted out of the building.

Ana visits Catherine and confesses the truth. Instead of being upset, she is proud of Ana for her honesty. After quietly confessing to Ana that she had cancelled the show in hopes of driving up the payout, Catherine agrees to rejoin the auction on the condition that Ana handles the sale.

Rehired, Ana manages to sell Catherine's art for much more than expected. She apologizes to William, who explains that he liked her not because she was rich, but because he thought she was honest.

Ana returns to New York. Six months later, she has not heard from William but is thriving in her career. Ana throws a party to celebrate the opening of her art gallery. At the end of the night, William arrives with a suitcase after everyone else has left.

== Cast ==
- Camila Mendes as Ana Santos
- Archie Renaux as William
- Marisa Tomei as Claire
- Lena Olin as Catherine
- Anthony Head as Julian Marx
- Thomas Kretschmann as Arnold Grant
- Grégory Montel as Gerard Abel
- Rachel Matthews as Suzette
- Fola Evans-Akingbola as Renee
- Aimee Carrero as Vivian
- Andrew Schulz as Ronnie
- Saoirse-Monica Jackson as Amy

== Production ==
In August 2022, it was reported that Camila Mendes and Archie Renaux were cast in the film, which entered production in the United Kingdom. The following month, it was announced that Marisa Tomei and Lena Olin were part of the cast.

== Soundtrack ==
The film was soundtracked by Isom Innis of Foster the People, with several tracks contributed by Rudy Mancuso. The soundtrack album was released on 11 April 2024.

== Release ==
Upgraded was released by Amazon Prime Video on February 9, 2024.

== Reception ==
On the review aggregator website Rotten Tomatoes, 78% of 49 critics' reviews are positive, with an average rating of 5.9/10. The website's consensus reads: "Lightly entertaining even as it hews to genre convictions, Upgraded is an appealing option for anyone seeking a good old-fashioned rom-com." Metacritic, which uses a weighted average, assigned the film a score of 59 out of 100, based on nine critics, indicating "mixed or average" reviews.
