= Lauren Kate =

American writer

Lauren Kate (born March 21, 1981) is an American author of adult and young adult fiction. She has published fifteen novels, one novella, and several short stories. Her books have been translated into over thirty languages, have sold more than eleven million copies worldwide, and have spent combined months on the New York Times Best Seller list.

Her titles include The Betrayal of Natalie Hargrove and Fallen, which reached number 1 on the New York Times Best Seller list for children's chapter books. Fallen's sequel Torment entered the NYT Best Seller list at number 1. The sequels Passion and Rapture also reached the spot of NYT Best Seller No. 1.

White Lights is Lauren Kate's fifteenth novel. It was released in the US, UK, Germany, and Holland on June 9, 2026.

== Biography ==
Kate was raised in Dallas, Texas. At Emory College in Atlanta, she double-majored in French Literature and Creative Writing. She has a master's degree in fiction from the University of California, Davis. Between her degrees, Kate worked as an editor at HarperCollins in New York City.

Kate has stated that experience of the "Old South" in the Atlanta area (she went to college at Emory) inspired her to set Fallen in a Civil War era academy.

Kate married Jason Morphew, a poet and singer-songwriter, at the winery where Morphew worked in Esparto, CA, in 2009. The poet Joe Wenderoth officiated their wedding. Lauren and Jason have two children and live in Los Angeles.

== Work ==
Kate's novel The Betrayal of Natalie Hargrove--which imagines Lady Macbeth as a contemporary Southern high schooler--was released on November 12, 2009. Her second work, Fallen (the first in the Fallen series), was released the same year. Torment, the sequel to Fallen, released on 28 September 2010, debuted at number 1 on the New York Times Bestseller List (Fallen came in that week at number 2), remaining at that position through the week of October 17. The paperback edition of Fallen debuted at number 1 on the list, as well. The third book in the Fallen series, entitled Passion, was released on June 14, 2011. A new edition of Natalie Hargrove was also released on the same day as the paperback edition of Torment. On June 23, Passion reached number 7 on the USA Today Bestseller List, for books overall. On July 3, 2011, Passion qualified the Fallen books for the Series section of the New York Times Bestseller List; it entered the list at number 2, behind the Hunger Games books. Each of the aforementioned Fallen books has appeared atop many other countries' bestseller lists, as well.

Fallen in Love—a collection of novellas set in the Middle Ages that tell the back-stories of several of the Fallen series' main characters—was published on January 24, 2012. Rapture, the final installment of the series, was published on June 12, 2012. Unforgiven, a spin-off novel featuring the side-character Cam Briel from the series and his love Lilith, was released on November 10, 2015.

Random House released the first book of Kate's subsequent series, Teardrop, in October 2013. A prequel novella, titled Last Day of Love, was released two months later in December 2013.

Kate recently published three adult rom-coms, starting with 2022's By Any Other Name. The following two rom-coms are set in an interlocking, paranormal Los Angeles: 2024's What's in a Kiss? and 2025's The Spirit of Love.

On May 2, 2025, Kate announced that she'd been contracted to write a new trilogy of fantasy novels called White Lights. The trilogy marks Kate's return to the love between angels and mortals.

== Publications ==
=== Middle grade ===
- One True Wish (April 25, 2023)

=== Young adult ===
==== Fallen series ====
- Fallen (December 9, 2009) – #1 New York Times Best Seller
- Torment (September 28, 2010) – #1 New York Times Best Seller
- Passion (June 14, 2011) – #1 New York Times Best Seller
- Fallen In Love (January 24, 2012) – New York Times Best Seller
- Rapture (June 12, 2012) – #1 New York Times Best Seller
- Angels In The Dark (Short Story Collection) (December 10, 2013)
- Unforgiven (November 10, 2015)

==== Teardrop series ====
- Teardrop (October 22, 2013) – New York Times Best Seller
- Last Day of Love (Prequel Novella) (December 10, 2013)
- Waterfall (October 28, 2014)

==== Standalone novels ====
- The Betrayal of Natalie Hargrove (November 12, 2009)

=== Adult ===
==== Standalone novels ====
- The Orphan's Song (June 25, 2019)
- By Any Other Name (March 1, 2022)

The Catalina Duology

- What's in a Kiss? (July 2, 2024)
- The Spirit of Love (July 1, 2025)

==== White Lights series ====
- White Lights (June 2026)

== Inspiration for characters ==
Kate has said that her characters are based on people that she knows, such as her husband being the "original" Cam Briel, a character from the Fallen novels.

On social media Kate has said that By Any Other Name is based on a true story that happened to her. In her twenties, while she was working as a publisher in New York, her overseas boyfriend broke up with her upon her arrival to meet him for a romantic motorcycle ride down the Amalfi Coast.

== Adaptations ==
The first film based on the novel Fallen was released in United States theaters on November 18, 2016, by Relativity Media. Disney optioned the film rights to the entire series on the day of Fallen's release (December 9, 2009). Screenwriters Kathryn Price and Nicole Millard were assigned screenwriting duties. When executives at Disney rejected their scripts, the movie was put in "turnaround." Relativity Media subsequently gained the rights to the film, with Mark Ciardi producing. Ciardi hired Scott Hicks to direct. Hicks tasked Michael Arlen Ross with rewriting the script. Ross' version became the script Hicks used when he shot the film. No version of any of the scripts for the film uses a single word from Lauren Kate's novel.

The 8-Part TV series adaptation of Fallen debuted on AMC in Spring 2025. On November 24, 2025, Fallen was awarded an International Emmy.

== Fallen-related music ==
Kate has said she mysteriously discovered original recordings from the novel Unforgiven by Cam and Lilith's band Revenge.
