= Timothy Innes =

English actor

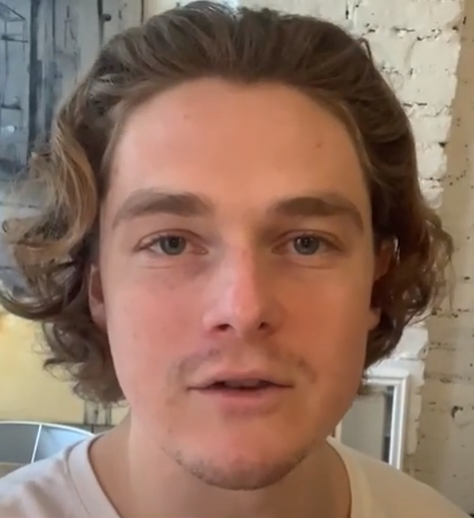
- Innes in 2023
- Born: 1 November 1993 (age 32); Crawley, West Sussex, England
- Education: Bristol Old Vic Theatre School
- Years active: 2016–present

Timothy Jacob A. Innes (born 1 November 1993) is an English actor. On television, he is known for his roles in the Netflix medieval drama The Last Kingdom (2018–2022) and the Globoplay fantasy series Fallen (2024).

== Early life ==
Innes was born in Crawley, West Sussex. He attended St Wilfrid's Catholic School. He took classes at Ariel Drama Academies and Sussex Actors Studio. He went on to graduate from Bristol Old Vic Theatre School in 2015 with a Bachelor of Arts in Acting.

== Career ==
Innes made his television debut in a 2016 episode of the BBC One medical soap opera Doctors. This was followed by his feature film debut the following year as Jimbo in Daphne and young Alex Stuart (played by Hilton McRae later in the character's life) in The Sense of an Ending. He also had a recurring role as Benjamin Lennox in the first series of the ITV Encore and Hulu period drama Harlots.

In 2018, Innes joined the main cast of the Netflix medieval drama The Last Kingdom for its third series as King Edward the Elder, a role he would portray for the final three series, the fifth and final of which premiered in 2022. He also appeared in the World War II film Ashes in the Snow and had a small role in The Favourite.

Innes played Algernon Moncrieffe in The Importance of Being Earnest at the Theatre Royal, Windsor in 2022. In 2024, he played Cam in the Globoplay series Fallen.

== Filmography ==
=== Film ===
Year	Title	Role	Notes
2016	Those Who Are Lost	Jacob	Short film
2017	Daphne	Jimbo	
2017	The Sense of an Ending	Young Alex Stuart	
2018	The Favourite	Footman	
2018	Ashes in the Snow	Nojus	
2019	Thousand Yesterdays	Young Charlie	Short film
2025	A Merry Little Ex-Mas	Nigel	
2026	Finding Emily	Tristan	Post-production
2026	The Death of Sherlock Holmes †	Edward Pembroke	Filming

=== Television ===
Year	Title	Role	Notes
2016	Doctors	Mark Walsh	Episode: "24"
2017	Harlots	Benjamin Lennox	6 episodes (series 1)
2018–2022	The Last Kingdom	King Edward	Main role (series 3–5)
2024	Fallen	Cameron "Cam" Briel	Main role

== Stage ==
Year	Title	Role	Notes
2022	The Importance of Being Earnest	Algernon Moncrieffe	Theatre Royal, Windsor
