= Torment (novel) =

Novel by Lauren Kate

- Cover for the initial release edition
- Author: Lauren Kate
- Cover artist: Fernanda Brussi Goncalves Angela Carlino
- Language: English
- Series: Fallen
- Genre: Young adult, Fantasy, Romance, Paranormal
- Publisher: Delacorte Press
- Publication date: September 28, 2010
- Publication place: United States
- Media type: Print (Hardcover, Paperback) e-Book (Kindle); Audio Book (CD)
- Pages: 452
- ISBN: 0-385-73914-1
- Preceded by: Fallen
- Followed by: Passion

Torment is the second novel in the Fallen series written by Lauren Kate. It is a young adult, fantasy, paranormal romance published in 2010 under Delacorte Press. It continues the story of Lucinda Price, who is cursed by being reincarnated every 17 years after involving herself in a romantic relationship with a fallen angel named Daniel. Something seems to be different during this lifetime, and Daniel is determined to keep Luce safe from hostile forces while he teams up with other angels and demons in an eighteen-day long truce. He installs Luce at the prestigious Shoreline school in Northern California, where she meets a number of nephilim students who have yet to choose between good and evil. Luce is frustrated by Daniel's unwillingness to be honest with her and is determined to discover the truth on her own. The book still revolves mostly around the concept of religion, fallen angels and reincarnation with the introduction of shadow travel.

The book received a rating of 3/5 in Common Sense Media and 8.7/10 in Fantasy Book Review. Carrie R. Wheadon of Common Sense Media said, "This book is romance purgatory -- stuck and seemingly going nowhere. Oh sure, Lauren Kate had a good thing going in the first book -- that is, if you liked Twilight at all and wished the vampires really had wings instead." while Book, Nerd & Critic said, "This book was just incredible. Once you reach a certain high in the book, you just can't stop reading! With twice the amount of drama, suspense, mystery and passion as the last book..."

Torment debuted at #1 on the New York Times Bestseller List, remaining at that position through the week of October 17, 2010. Like its predecessor, the book has also been translated in more than 30 languages.

== Synopsis ==
=== Plot ===
After the dramatic events of Fallen, Cam and Daniel make an eighteen-day truce to protect Luce from the Outcasts—beings who are neither angels nor demons. Luce is hidden at Shoreline, a school where both humans and Nephilim attended. Luce finds out more about her past lives with the help of two Nephilim friends: Shelby, Luce's roommate, and Miles, whose affection for Luce causes her to doubt her relationship with Daniel. Daniel will do anything to protect her, which includes forcing her to stay at Shoreline to keep Luce safe. Discovering some of her past lives, Luce realizes how their love hurt the thousands of families she once lived with. During her time in Shoreline, Luce's division between angels and demons becomes blurry when she discovers that Daniel and Cam are fighting side by side. At times, Daniel visits her to try to make her feel happier about her situation. She then finds out he had a fling with Shelby many years ago. At one time, when Daniel comes to visit her, he sees Miles kiss Luce on a window sill. She finds out that not only the Elders want her, but that the Outcasts want to capture her. Luce's parents have a Thanksgiving party, and when her parents go out, the Outcasts arrive in Luce's backyard to fight the angels. Luce finds out that Miles has feelings for her, as he can replicate a person, but only if he loves them. Luce is stressed from the violence and decides to find out more about her past lives by jumping through one of the shadows, leaving everybody behind her, leaving her past and into her future while Daniel, her true love, follows her.

=== Recurring Characters ===
- Lucinda 'Luce' Price

Daniel sends Luce to a new school in California called Shoreline, where, as he said, she will be safe. Luce doesn't really know safe from what - that is something she will only discover through history. She is now hungry to find out about her past lives as Daniel won't tell her anything. As the story evolves, Luce shows a deep resentment to Daniel. If they had never met in another past life to begin with, she could have had a normal life without having to die and be reborn every 17 years. These feelings will come in conflict with the love she still feels for Daniel, while developing feelings for Miles which she constantly feels guilty for. The feeling of resentment towards Daniel is largely due to the fact that she doesn't understand anything which is why she jumps through an announcer towards the end, in order to learn about her past lives and her love for Daniel.

- Daniel Grigori

Daniel is a fallen angel, and in Torment he is Luce's boyfriend. He is forced to leave Luce in Shoreline in order to protect her. He makes a covenant, or rather a truce, of 18 days with Cam, so they can hunt those who want to hurt Luce together. Despite the fact that he is not meant to see Luce as it draws too much attention, he still finds a way to get near her. However, every time results in an argument between the pair as Luce grows impatient with the fact that Daniel cannot tell her anything.

- Cameron 'Cam' Briel

Cam is also a fallen angel. He makes a pact with Daniel for 18 days so that both could hunt outcasts sent by the elders who are trying to kill Luce. He doesn't have a huge role in this book, but he does show a more caring side as he helps protect Luce from getting killed when she is lured off campus and starts to seem more protective over her.

- Arriane Alter

Arriane is another fallen angel, from Daniel's side. After rescuing Luce, Shelby, and Miles from a revealing moment gone wrong, she decides to stay in Shoreline, from then on, to keep an eye on Luce. Like Cam, she doesn't have a huge role in the book but she turns up at a convenient time and sort of clues Luce in a little bit without revealing too much. She tries persuading Luce to forget her feeling for Miles and stick with Daniel.

- Roland Sparks

He is another fallen angel, from Cam's side. In Torment, he will also transfer and study at Shoreline to oversee Luce better. Roland is friendly, and popular as ever.

- Mary Margaret 'Molly' Zane

Fallen angel on Cam's side. She says that Shelby's personality reminds her a lot of herself.

- Gabrielle (Gabbe) Givens

Gabbe is a fallen angel on the side of Daniel. Her very polished looks belie her extraordinary strength. She helps fight the outcasts at Luce's Thanksgiving dinner.

- Mr. Cole

History teacher at Sword & Cross. He is the only human, besides Luce, to be aware of the fallen angels.

- Callie

Callie is the best friend of Luce back in Dover Prep School. She discovers the identity of Luce's classmates during an unfortunate event at Thanksgiving.

=== New Characters ===
- Miles Fisher

He is a Nephilim (part angel, but mainly human), and one of the first friends that Luce makes in Shoreline. His talent as being part of the angel bloodline is to be able to mirror others and himself, though he was only able to do it once before he met Luce (that being a mirror of his mom). Miles honors his statement that he can only perform this for people he has strong feelings for. Gentle and friendly, he soon wins her trust. He helps Luce understand a little more about the Announcers. Miles kisses her at one point outside her dorm room and confesses his love to her, Daniel witnesses the encounter. He is liked by Luce's parents, also and has a friendly sort of banter with Shelby.

- Shelby Sterris

Luce's roommate, who is also a Nephilim. A little grumpy at the beginning, giving the impression of disliking Luce, but with time gets attached to her. She had a crush on Daniel and insinuates that she had an affair with him, which was one of the reasons for disliking Luce at first. (Although in an extract it is revealed that nothing much really happened other than the fact that she tried hitting on him but he was too emotionally scarred by Luce's last death.)She loves practicing yoga. Shelby helps Luce manipulate the shadows to look at the past, and is great at observing details that help Luce track over her past lives. Her ex-boyfriend is actually an outcast, who was using her to get to Luce.

- Dawn

Another nephilim who is Jasmine's best friend and one of Luce's friends in Shoreline. She has an irrepressible enthusiasm, being extremely lively and fun. Her physiognomy (appearance) is very similar to that of Luce, telling her that the two no longer seemed twins after Luce bleached her hair blonde.

- Jasmine

Nephilim and best friends with Dawn. She is smoother than Dawn, but she is also perpetually happy, very lively and caring.

- Steven Filmore

Professor of Shoreline along with Francesca, but unlike her, Steven is a demon. He is called "Silver Fox" sometimes by Dawn. His hair is silver and is known to have a slim, attractive body. He is the first of the teachers to agree to Luce's work with the Announcers (shadow beings that are able to store messages of the past).

- Francesca

Professor of Shoreline along with Steven. Unlike Steven, Francesca is an angel. She is described by Luce as a beautiful woman with beautiful body and golden curls. Francesca admits later in the book that she has feelings for Steven but is unable to commit to them once they have to fight.

- Phil

The so-called "Sorry-ass ex-boyfriend" of Shelby, who spies on Luce's stay at Shoreline without anybody's knowing it even Shelby who will provide more information. He is one of the Outcasts and will be the one to lead a group of Outcasts in the Thanksgiving party where fallen angels, Luce's family, best friend and Nephilim friends will attend.

=== Types of characters ===
- Fallen Angels

According to the Bible, a fallen angel is an angel who, coveting a higher power, ends up delivering "the darkness and sin." The term fallen angel indicates that it is an angel who fell from heaven. The most famous is fallen angel Lucifer himself. The fallen angels are quite common in stories of conflict between good and evil.

- Nephilim

Nephilim are the sons of fallen angels with mortals. According to Torment, a few Nephilim have wings and may possess minor supernatural talents (clones, mind reading, etc.)

- Outcast

A particular rank of angels. Cam describes them as the worst kind of angel. They stood next to Satan during the revolt, but did not step into the underworld with him. Once the battle ended, they tried to return to heaven, but it was too late. He also mentions that when they tried to go to hell, Satan cast them out permanently, and left them blind. Nevertheless, the outcasts have a tremendous control of the other four senses. In Torment, they chase Luce because they think that if they captured her, they would get back to heaven.

- Elders

It is not explained very well what the Elders are, but they want to see Luce dead more than anything. Miss Sophia is one them, and tried to kill Luce at the end of Fallen.

== Legacy ==
=== Sequels ===
The series was in total five books long. The first book, Fallen, was released on December 8, 2009. The third book, Passion, was released on June 14, 2011. The fourth book, Rapture, was released on June 12, 2012. Also released on January 24, 2012 released a side novel Fallen In Love which settles between the settings of Passion and Rapture. The fifth book, Unforgiven, was released on November 10, 2015.
