= Archie Renaux =

English actor, model (born 1997)

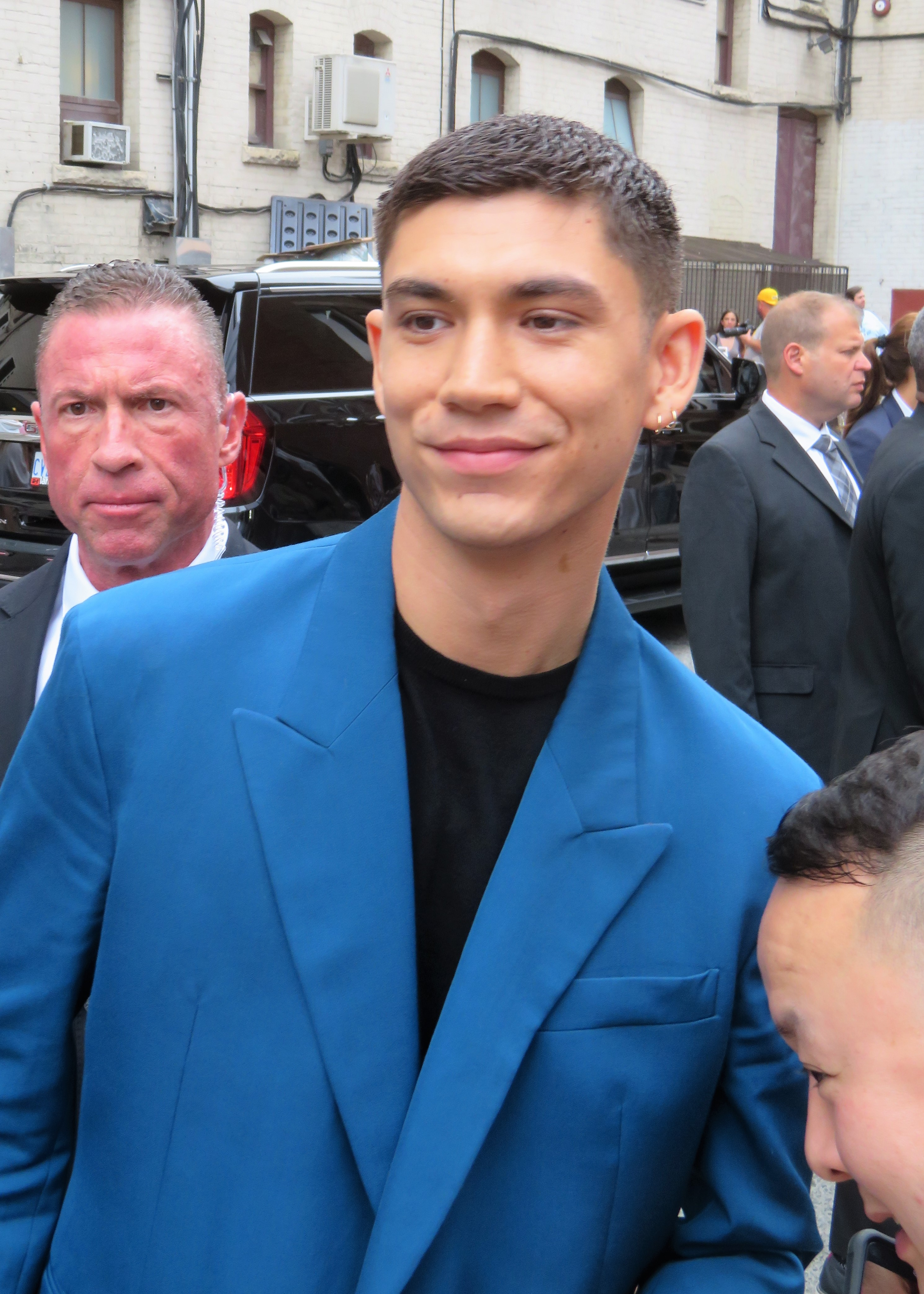
- Renaux at the 2022 Toronto International Film Festival
- Born: Archie James Beale; Kingston upon Thames, Greater London, England
- Occupation: Actor
- Years active: 2016–present
- Partner: Annie O'Hara
- Children: 1

Archie James Beale, known professionally as Archie Renaux, is an English actor. On television, he is known for his roles in the BBC One miniseries Gold Digger (2019), the Netflix series Shadow and Bone (2021–2023) and the Sky Atlantic series War (2026). His films include Upgraded and Alien: Romulus (both 2024).

== Early life and education ==
Archie Renaux is from Tolworth in Kingston upon Thames. His mother's side of the family is Anglo-Indian. He has two sisters and a brother. Renaux attended Richard Challoner School before going on to train at the Unseen, a drama school in London.

== Career ==
Renaux quit his 9–5 apprenticeship as an air conditioning engineer to become an actor.

He began his career in modelling, working for Topman, Nasir Mazhar, Moss Bros, and Men's Fashion Week.

In 2017, Renaux was cast in the dystopian film Zero. In 2019, he made his television debut with a guest role in the Amazon Prime series Hanna and, as announced in 2018, with a main role as Leo Day in the 2019 BBC One miniseries Gold Digger. Renaux had small roles as Alex in the film Voyagers and Bobby in Marvel's Morbius.

In October 2019, it was announced Renaux would star as Malyen "Mal" Oretsev in the 2021 Netflix series Shadow and Bone, an adaptation of the overlapping fantasy book series Shadow and Bone and Six of Crows by Leigh Bardugo. In 2022, Renaux appeared in the Amazon Prime medieval comedy film Catherine Called Birdy and the Apple TV+ biographical film The Greatest Beer Run Ever. In 2023 and 2024, he appeared in the films The Other Zoey, Upgraded, and Alien: Romulus.

== Personal life ==
Renaux announced through a post on Instagram in June 2020 that he and his girlfriend Annie O'Hara were expecting a child. Their daughter was born in October 2020. In August 2024, Renaux revealed he and O'Hara were engaged.

He is a Chelsea F.C. fan.

== Filmography ==
=== Film ===
Key
| † | Denotes works that have not yet been released |

| Year | Title | Role | Notes |
|---|---|---|---|
| 2018 | Feline | David | |
| 2020 | Body of Water | Jamie | |
| 2021 | Voyagers | Alex | |
| 2022 | Morbius | Bobby | |
| 2022 | Catherine Called Birdy | Edward the Monk | |
| 2022 | The Greatest Beer Run Ever | Tommy Collins | |
| 2023 | The Other Zoey | Miles Maclaren | |
| 2024 | Upgraded | William | |
| 2024 | Alien: Romulus | Tyler | |
| 2026 | Falling | Johnny | |

=== Television ===
| Year | Title | Role | Notes |
|---|---|---|---|
| 2019 | Hanna | Feliciano | 1 episode |
| 2019 | Gold Digger | Leo Day | Miniseries, 6 episodes |
| 2021–2023 | Shadow and Bone | Malyen "Mal" Oretsev | Main role |
| 2024 | The Jetty | Simon "Hitch" Hitchson | Main role |
| 2026 | War | Jonathan "Johnny" Warren | Main role |

=== Music videos ===
| Song | Year | Artist | Notes |
|---|---|---|---|
| "Mayflies" | 2016 | Benjamin Francis Leftwich | |
| "Searching" | 2017 | Liv Dawson | |
