= Passion (novel) =

2011 young adult fantasy novel by Lauren Kate

- Cover for the initial release edition
- Author: Lauren Kate
- Cover artist: Fernanda Brussi Goncalves Rebecca Roeske Angela Carlino
- Language: English
- Series: Fallen
- Genre: Young adult, Fantasy, Romance, Paranormal
- Publisher: Delacorte Press
- Publication date: June 14, 2011
- Publication place: United States
- Media type: Print (Hardcover, Paperback) e-Book (Kindle); Audio Book (CD)
- Pages: 432
- ISBN: 0-385-73916-8
- Preceded by: Torment
- Followed by: Rapture

Passion is the third novel in the Fallen series written by Lauren Kate. It is a young adult, fantasy, paranormal romance published in 2011 under Delacorte Press. It continues the story of Lucinda Price who, at the end of Torment, decides to find out more about her past lives by stepping through an Announcer, ignoring Daniel's plea to stop. Daniel, a fallen angel, decides to follow her, promising to find and rescue her. Before Luce and Daniel met at Sword & Cross, before they fought the Immortals, they had already lived many lives. And so Luce, desperate to unlock the curse that condemns their love, must revisit her past incarnations in order to understand her fate. Each century, each life, holds a different clue. But Daniel is chasing her throughout the centuries before she has a chance to rewrite history.

Goodreads is the only critic who reviewed the book, giving it a score of 3.9/5.

Despite the reviews, Passion, reached the number 7 spot on the USA Today Bestseller list on June 23, 2011, after its first week of release. On July 3, 2011, Passion reached number 2 on the New York Times Bestseller list, right behind the Hunger Games series. Like Fallen and Torment, Passion has also been translated in more than 30 languages.

== Synopsis ==
=== Plot ===
At the opening of the novel, Luce is running blindly through time, using Announcers as portals to her past lives. Luce is cursed to die every seventeen years and be reincarnated, but she has no idea what causes her continual deaths. All Luce knows is that with every death, she is separated from her lover, Daniel, who follows her through eternity, falling in love with her again and again, in every lifetime. As Luce sprints blindly through time, she meets a small gargoyle named Bill who claims to have all the answers Luce needs, if she will let him travel with her. Although Luce is skeptical, she decides to partner with Bill in the hopes that he will speed her quest along. Meanwhile, Daniel is also traveling through time trying to find Luce. He knows that what Luce is doing is extremely dangerous. If she makes one false move, she could alter history forever, potentially killing herself for good. But Daniel is not the only one in search of Luce; many of the other fallen angels, and Cam, a demon, race through time trying to track her down. Although their motives aren't entirely clear, it is understood that if they find Luce before Daniel does, it could have grave consequences. Luce's friends from school, Shelby and Miles, are also attempting to locate Luce but being Nephilim - the offspring of fallen angels and humans - their time traveling skills are clumsy at best, creating extremely dangerous situations for all history.

Throughout the novel, Luce travels to various times in her history, ranging from Moscow, 1941 to the literal beginning of history at Heaven's Gate, moments before the angels' fall. In each of these short visits, Luce struggles to discover the meaning behind her deaths and the truth of her love for Daniel. Luce goes through many different transitions, first feeling that Daniel is attracted to her simply because of the curse, not because he actually loves her. From there, Luce learns that in every reincarnation, her soul is automatically drawn to Daniel's and Daniel could have taken advantage of that seemingly mindless admiration. Instead, in each life, Daniel wins Luce over. He makes sacrifices to earn her love again and again. In this, Luce learns that Daniel loves her more deeply than she ever imagined. In her attempt to understand why she continues to die again and again, Luce learns from Bill how to "go 3-D" cleaving her current soul to her past souls, allowing Luce to enter the bodies of her past selves and experience her histories as if they are occurring in the present moment. Through this, Luce sees a montage of images of Daniel's face whenever she dies. Luce believes that Daniel is terrified not of what is happening to Luce, but of Luce herself. Through Bill's guidance, Luce makes the decision to kill her eternal soul - the soul cursed to be reincarnate forever - thus setting herself, and Daniel, free from their oppressive love forever. Once the curse is broken, Luce and Daniel will cease to exist. Their souls will no longer be drawn together and they will be strangers to each other. Although it breaks her heart, Luce believes that this is the only way to truly set Daniel free.

Bill is inexplicably gleeful at the thought of Luce killing her soul, and makes all the necessary arrangements for Luce's decision. When the moment arrives, however, Luce is unable to free her soul, claiming that she could never separate herself from Daniel and that there must be another way to break the curse. When he hears this, Bill is furious. He transforms from being a sweet gray gargoyle to evil incarnate. Throughout their entire journey, Bill - who is really Satan - has been deceiving Luce in the hopes of breaking Daniel's heart, sending him to the Dark Side. When Lucifer stepped away from Heaven, all the angels were forced to choose a side: Heaven or Hell. A handful of angels - including Daniel, Cam, and many of Luce's school friends - chose not to take a side, and were forced out of Heaven, becoming fallen angels. Since then, both Heaven and Hell have been trying to convince the angels to choose one side or the other, thus altering the power of good and evil in the world. Satan needs one more angel to gain more power than Heaven, and he hoped Daniel would be that soul. Now, he must hatch a new plan to win over Daniel's soul, a plan that will be executed in the fourth and final book of the series. At the end of the novel, Luce and Daniel are reunited with the rest of the fallen angels, and prepare to battle Satan for their eternal souls, in the hopes of saving the world and breaking the curse between Luce and Daniel once and for all.

=== Recurring Characters ===
- Lucinda 'Luce' Price

After the events in Torment, she will try to travel to her different past lives to find out what are the secrets Daniel is hiding from her, and she will find a way to end the curse that both their love has.

- Daniel Grigori

Luce's fallen angel lover. He will try to bring Luce back to the present, from the shadows. He will realize that he, himself, can do something to end their curse.

- Cameron 'Cam' Briel

Cam is also a fallen angel. He will try to help Daniel recover Luce from the shadows, but Daniel would always refuse help. His past will be revealed and the reason for his being "evil" will be known.

- Arriane Alter

Arriane is another fallen angel, from Daniel's side. She will be one of the few who will try to get Luce back from the shadows. She and Roland are together.

- Roland Sparks

He is another fallen angel, from Cam's side. He will be able to speak to Luce in one of her past lives and know that she is from the future. He and Arriane are a couple.

- Mary Margaret 'Molly' Zane

Fallen angel on Cam's side who has never gotten on with Luce since the beginning.

- Gabrielle 'Gabbe' Givens

Gabbe is a fallen angel on the side of Daniel. She tries her best to convince Daniel to side with Heaven.

- Miles Fisher

He is one of the Nephilim, and one of the first friends that Luce makes in Shoreline (in Torment). He proved his love for Luce in Torment. In this book, he will be helpful to Daniel, and will soon be in good terms with him.

- Shelby

A Nephilim friend of Luce. She will be with Miles looking for Luce in the shadows.

=== New characters ===
- Annabelle

She was introduced briefly in Fallen, but will play some more minor roles in Passion. She is introduced to Luce as Arriane's older sister, with pink hair. She is also much calmer than Arriane.

- Lucifer/Bill

The first fallen angel. One of the reasons of the start of the Heaven War. He tricks Luce in the announcers appearing as a little gargoyle, Bill. He tries to make Luce kill one of her past lives.

- Lyrica

One of the remaining Elders.

- Vivina

One of the remaining Elders.

=== Types of characters ===
- Fallen Angels

According to the Bible, a fallen angel is an angel who, coveting a higher power, ends up delivering "the darkness and sin." The term "fallen angel" indicates that it is an angel who fell from heaven. The most famous is Fallen Angel Lucifer himself. The Fallen Angels are quite common in stories of conflict between good and evil.

- Nephilim

They are the children of fallen angels with mortals.

- Outcast

A particular rank of angels. Cam describes them as the worst kind of angel. They stood next to the bad one during the "revolt", but did not step into the underworld with him. Once the battle ended, they tried to return to heaven, but it was too late. He also mentions that when they tried to go to the underworld, the bad one cast them out permanently, and left them blind. Nevertheless, the outcasts have a tremendous control of the other four senses. In "torment", they chased Luce because they think that if they captured her, they will get back to heaven.

- Elders

It is not explained very well what the elders are, but they want to see Luce dead more than anything. Miss Sophia is the eldest and most important member.

- Scale

Are minor angels who remained faithful to the throne. They act as law makers for fallen as the monitor them on earth. They are described as having blue wings and wearing brown cloaks. Some reside inside the Announcers (also known as the "Shadows").

== Legacy ==
=== Sequels ===
The series was in total five books long. The first book, Fallen, was released on December 8, 2009. The second book, Torment, was released on September 28, 2010. The fourth book, Rapture, was released on June 12, 2012. Also released on January 24, 2012 released a side novel Fallen In Love which settles between the settings of Passion and Rapture. The fifth book, Unforgiven, was released on November 10, 2015.
