= Rapture (Kate novel) =

2012 novel by Lauren Kate

- Author: Lauren Kate
- Cover artist: Fernanda Brussi Goncalves Amber Lynn Jackson Isobel Eksteen
- Language: English
- Series: Fallen
- Genre: Young adult, Fantasy, Romance, Paranormal
- Publisher: Delacorte Press
- Publication date: December 06, 2012
- Publication place: United States
- Media type: Print (Hardcover, Paperback) e-Book (Kindle); Audio Book (CD)
- Pages: 443
- ISBN: 978-0-385-73918-4
- Preceded by: Passion

Rapture is the fourth novel in the Fallen series written by Lauren Kate. It is a young adult, fantasy, paranormal romance published in 2012 under Delacorte Press. It continues the story of Luce, Daniel and their angel companions who have nine days to search the world for a way to stop Lucifer from recreating the Fall and rewriting history. Therefore, they must determine the exact location where the angels fell to earth so many millennia ago. The group breaks up to find three relics that will give them the key to do so, but it is not as easy as it sounds. The angels and Luce have no idea what or where the relics are, only rough sketches that Daniel drew centuries ago. However, the relics are not the only things that Luce needs to find.

A Goodreads review of the book, gave it a score of 4/5. An editorial review in Barnes and Noble said, "The fourth volume of Lauren Kate's Fallen novel series brings this story of human and angel love to a rapturous conclusion. Each of its predecessors has been an international bestseller and it's easy to see why: The story of Lucinda Price and her angelic boyfriend Daniel casting off lives and centuries as they search for an eternal union possesses magnetic appeal for a wide swath of readers."

== Synopsis ==
=== Plot ===
Luce, Daniel, and the other angels had nine days to stop Lucifer from bending time and erasing everything since the Fall. They fought many Scale, the elders, Miss Sophia with the help of the Outcasts. They are in allegiance with the Outcasts now. In order to locate the site of the Fall, they have to find the three relics first.

Everything was up to Luce this time. She now has the ability to see through her past lives without the use of an Announcer. She discovered her true nature on just her own. She knew that the curse prevented her from knowing her true nature as an angel, causing her to die whenever she began to approach a memory of her past. That is why none of the others could tell her who she was.

She was once an angel and even became Lucifer's Evening Light. Lucinda and Lucifer had loved each other long before The Fall, and they invented love. Her first love has been Lucifer, and she had been his. Lucinda and Lucifer became the first beings to experiment with affection beyond God. He grew more possessive, more envious of Lucinda's adoration of the Throne.

The reason why Lucifer wants to wipe the slate clean is because he wants to reset the universe to have Lucinda back—to choose him instead of Daniel. Lucinda loved Daniel more than Lucifer because Daniel wants her for who she is and he would never eclipse her with his desires. Her betrayal of Lucifer was what this Fall was all about. Lucinda loved Lucifer until it hurt her, until their love was consumed by his pride and rage. She stopped loving Lucifer because the thing that he called love made her disappear. Their adoration never diminished the Throne, but his love diminished her.

In the end she was the angel who would tip the scales. The punishment that she bore in millennia was hers, not Daniel's. During the fall, both Lucinda and Daniel still chose love as the highest of all. The Throne cannot do anything about it because it is out of their hands. But it will come at a price—the giving up of their angelic natures. They will be born again, made anew as mortals. They will not remember anything, no angel would cross their path, they will live and they will die, just like every other mortal. Luce and Daniel accepted but with one condition—to return the Outcasts back into the fold of Heaven.

Seventeen years later, Luce is studying at Emerald College. Her parents drive her to Emerald and as they pass by the Sword & Cross Reform school, her parents say, "That's a little ominous. Glad you're not going to school there, Luce!" Luce did go to Sword & Cross in her former life, but she does not remember. There is a party after the orientation week on the other rooms at their dormitory. Luce is invited by her wacky roommate, Nora. Luce leaves the party to seek quiet air. When she is in the courtyard, she meets a really handsome boy—short golden hair, soft-looking lips and gorgeous violet eyes. He introduced himself as Daniel.

The line that Luce said to Daniel in Fallen but now said by Daniel to Luce..."You just—you look so familiar. I could have sworn we've met somewhere before" is the line that begins everything. And at that moment, Luce's and Daniel's angel friends (whom they do not remember now) Arriane, Roland, Annabelle, Miles and Shelby are watching them from above.

=== Recurring Characters ===
- Lucinda 'Luce' Price

After the events in Torment, she will try to travel to her different past lives to find out what are the secrets Daniel is hiding from her, and she will find a way to end the curse that both their love has.

- Daniel Grigori

Luce's fallen angel boyfriend. He will try to bring Luce back to the present, from the shadows. He will realize that he, himself, can do something to end their curse.

- Cameron 'Cam' Briel

Cam is also a fallen angel. He will try to help Daniel recover Luce from the shadows, but Daniel would always refuse help. His past will be revealed and the reason for his being "evil" will be known.

- Arriane Alter

Arriane is another fallen angel, from Daniel's side. She will be one of the few who will try to get Luce back from the shadows.

- Roland Sparks

He is another fallen angel, from Cam's side. He will be able to speak to Luce in one of her past lives and know that she is from the future.

- Mary Margaret 'Molly' Zane

Fallen angel on Cam's side who has never gotten on with Luce since the beginning.

- Gabrielle 'Gabbe' Givens

Gabbe is a fallen angel on the side of Daniel. She tries her best to convince Daniel to side with Heaven.

- Miles Fisher

One of the Nephilim, and one of the first friends that Luce makes in Torment.

- Shelby

A Nephilim friend of Luce. She will be with Miles looking for Luce in the shadows.

- Annabelle

She was introduced briefly in Fallen, but will play some more minor roles in Passion. She is introduced to Luce as Arriane's older sister, with pink hair and calmer than Arriane.

- Lucifer/Bill

The first fallen angel. One of the reasons of the start of the Heaven War. He tricks Luce in the announcers appearing as a little gargoyle, Bill. He tries to make Luce kill one of her past lives.

- Lyrica

One of the remaining Elders.

- Vivina

One of the remaining Elders.

=== Types of characters ===
- Fallen Angels

According to the Bible, a fallen angel is an angel who, coveting a higher power, ends up delivering "the darkness and sin." The term "fallen angel" indicates that it is an angel who fell from heaven. The most famous is Fallen Angel Lucifer himself. The Fallen Angels are quite common in stories of conflict between good and evil.

- Nephilim

They are the children of fallen angels with mortals.

- Outcast

A particular rank of angels. Cam describes them as the worst kind of angel. They stood next to the bad one during the "revolt", but did not step into the underworld with him. Once the battle ended, they tried to return to heaven, but it was too late. He also mentions that when they tried to go to the underworld, the bad one cast them out permanently, and left them blind. Nevertheless, the outcasts have a tremendous control of the other four senses. In "torment", they chased Luce because they think that if they captured her, they will get back to heaven.

- Elders

It is not explained very well what the elders are, but they want to see Luce dead more than anything. Miss Sophia is the eldest and most important member.

- Scale

Are minor angels who remained faithful to the throne. They act as lawmakers for fallen as the monitor them on earth. They are described as having blue wings and wearing brown cloaks. Some reside inside the Announcers (also known as the "Shadows").

== Legacy ==
=== Sequels ===
The series was in total five books long. The first book, Fallen, was released on December 8, 2009. The second book, Torment, was released on September 28, 2010. The third book, Passion, was released on June 14, 2011. Also released on January 24, 2012, a side novel titled Fallen In Love, set between the settings of Passion and Rapture. The fifth book, Unforgiven, was released on November 10, 2015.
