= Fallen (Kate novel) =

2009 novel by Lauren Kate

- Cover for the initial release edition
- Author: Lauren Kate
- Cover artist: Mo Farrelly
- Language: English
- Series: Fallen
- Genre: Young adult, fantasy, romance, paranormal
- Publisher: Delacorte Press
- Publication date: December 8, 2009
- Publication place: United States
- Media type: Print (hardcover, paperback) e-Book (Kindle); Audio Book (CD)
- Pages: 452
- ISBN: 0-385-73893-5
- Followed by: Torment

Fallen is the first novel in the Fallen series written by Lauren Kate. It is a young adult, fantasy, paranormal romance published in 2009 under Delacorte Press. The novel revolves around a young girl named Lucinda "Luce" Price who is sent to Sword & Cross Reform School in Savannah, Georgia, after she is accused of murdering a boy by starting a fire. At the reform school, she meets Daniel, a handsome boy whom she feels inexplicably drawn to, and believes that she has already met before. The book revolves mostly around the concept of religion, fallen angels and reincarnation.

Fallen is the first in a series of six books, which have sold more than 10 million copies worldwide in more than 30 countries. The novel has been translated into more than 30 languages and has more than 80 cover editions. On December 27, 2009, Fallen reached number 3 on the New York Times Best Seller list. It was also a USA Today Bestseller, an Indie Bestseller, and a Publishers Weekly Flying Start. It has been made into a feature-length film of the same name under Lotus Entertainment which was released in November 2016, and a TV show in 2024.

== Plot ==
Luce is sent to 'Sword and Cross', a reform school for young adults, after she is blamed for the death of Trevor, another student. Although Luce cannot remember what happened exactly, she remembers kissing Trevor at her previous school's summer camp. After the kiss, Trevor spontaneously combusted. Luce believes herself to be innocent, which angers her disbelieving peers.

Upon arriving at her new school, Luce encounters fearsome Randy and shy boy Todd, along with Gabbe, a pretty blonde-haired girl, and Cameron, an attractive-looking boy who has been sent to Sword and Cross for the second time.

Before her first class, Luce notices a tall, handsome boy across the grounds whom she feels she somehow recognizes. She suddenly becomes nervous and panicky, which she doesn't understand. Arriane tells Luce that his name is Daniel Grigori. Standing next to Daniel is Roland Sparks, a boy with dreadlocks.

Around campus, Luce also begins to see "The Shadows," paranormal, ink-like smudges that she has been seeing since childhood.

Later, Cam invites Luce to a party, seeming to be competing with Daniel for closeness with Luce. At the party, Luce begins to develops a crush on Cam, but her feelings are hindered by her feeling of unusual connection with Daniel. Later, Luce overhears Daniel and Gabbe whispering to each other outside, leading Luce to believe that they are in a relationship and making her jealous.

That Saturday, Luce confronts Daniel about Gabbe, to which he confirms that he is not in a relationship with Gabbe. This simultaneously relieves and embarrasses Luce for being so upfront about the situation. Daniel takes Luce to a hidden-away lake, where they swim together. Daniel warns Luce that he cannot get involved with her romantically as he has been previously "burned". He leaves Luce there, and Luce thinks she sees a pair of faint wings on Daniel's back as he runs off.

Later, in the library, Luce witnesses more Shadows, and a fire breaks out. With her in library is Todd, and both flee. Unable to escape the smoke, Luce experiences an apparent out-of-body experience, where she can feel herself literally flying out of the smoke. Another Shadow attacks her and Todd, and Luce blacks out. She wakes up in the hospital the next day, and Gabbe tells her that Daniel carried her out of the fire, but Todd did not survive.

At Todd's memorial service two days later, Cam comforts Luce over Todd's death, which she cannot help but feel partially responsible for. Daniel interrupts Cam and Luce, and takes her back to the lake, where he tells Luce that she deserves better than Cam. Luce talks to Daniel about the Shadows she sees, which shocks him. After near-kiss between Luce and Daniel, Daniel flees out of sight, leaving a purple haze behind him.

Cam takes Luce on a date outside of the school grounds. At a bar, however, Cam is forced into a fight with some drunken men, and shows inhuman strength.

Soon after this, Daniel explains the increasingly bizarre happenings at the school. The majority of the students are fallen angels; Gabbe, Arriane, and another student, Annabelle, are all on the side of God, while Cam, Roland, and Molly, a heavily pierced Goth student, are under Satan's rule. Daniel has yet to choose a side. It is revealed that Daniel is cursed to love Luce. When he gets too close to her emotionally, she spontaneously combusts, and later reincarnates. However, in this lifetime she has remained alive, despite a kiss that they share. Luce learns that because she was not baptized in this lifetime, if she dies, she will not be reincarnated.

A battle between the angels breaks out, and the school librarian, Miss Sophia, leads Luce and Penn (the only other mortal) to safety. Miss Sophia reveals herself to be one of the 24 Elders of Zhsmaelim, a radical heavenly sect that is interested in finally tipping the balance between good and evil by making Daniel choose a side. She hopes that with Luce dead for good, Daniel would be forced to choose a side. She kills Penn with a dagger and attempts to kill Luce, but Daniel, Arriane, and Gabbe stop her. The battle outside has ended, but there is no victor.

Daniel informs Luce that she must be taken somewhere safe and entrusts her to Mr. Cole, one of the teachers at the school who knows about the fallen angels. Luce is transported away by an airplane after sharing one final kiss with Daniel, who promises that he will see her soon.

== Main characters ==
- Lucinda 'Luce' Price – Luce is the main protagonist of the novel. She began seeing "shadows" at a young age, these are revealed to be announcers and are "shadows of the past", something angels and demons are able to use to time travel. She is sent to Sword & Cross, a reform school, when a boy is killed in a fire, which she is blamed for starting. Upon her arrival at Sword & Cross she meets Daniel and Cam, both of whom she falls for. However, she is drawn to Daniel and feels as if she knows him from somewhere but what she discovers is beyond her imagination. Luce has actually been Daniel's lover in past lives but they are both cursed and every time Luce learns of her past and gets close to being with Daniel, she dies. She is friendly and beautiful and despite falling for Cam in the beginning, she realizes her love for Daniel is very powerful and strong as she has loved him for thousands of years. Due to the fact that her parents haven't had her baptized in her current incarnation, she's no longer able to re-incarnate, hence breaking the cycle.
- Daniel Grigori – Daniel is a fallen angel—a heavenly being who chose to side with neither God nor Satan at the beginning of time—instead he chose love. He is also Luce's romantic interest. He feigns disinterest in Luce, trying to ignore her for her own safety, due to a curse that has spanned since the beginning of time, but eventually gives in as he can't stay away from her. He is very secretive about Luce's past but it is mainly to do with the fact that he's scared that if she learns of it too quickly, she will die. He has watched her die many times and he doesn't want to lose her again. His love for Luce is very strong and he has a rocky friendship with Cam due to Cam trying to get Luce. He is supposedly the only Fallen Angel that has yet to choose a side and apparently, if he chooses one, the balance will tip as he was supposedly very high up on the throne in heaven.
- Cameron 'Cam' Briel – Cam is the antagonist of the story and Luce's other romantic interest. He is also a fallen angel—or Demon as he chose to side with Lucifer. He continuously tries to charm Luce and is antagonistic towards Daniel. In this book, he is portrayed as being evil, but we do learn that he has a more caring side to him.
- Lucifer/Bill – A fallen angel, first appeared in the third book, he is later revealed to be Lucifer, the first angel and the former and first love of Lucinda .
- Arriane Alter – Arriane is a fallen angel. She befriends Luce on Luce's first day at Sword & Cross. She refers to herself as a psychopath. She chose to side with God.
- Pennyweather 'Penn' Van Syckle-Lockwood – One of Luce's friends. She is the daughter of the deceased groundskeeper. She is described as frumpy and unpopular, but her friendship proves to be a great asset, as she has access and knowledge about Sword & Cross and shares her expertise with Luce. She is later killed by Miss Sophia, the librarian. She is human and it is unknown if she found out about the Fallen Angels before she was killed.
- Gabrielle 'Gabbe' Givens – Gabbe is a very beautiful and graceful fallen angel at the school. Luce dislikes Gabbe at first because she believes that she is dating Daniel, though Gabbe is unerringly gracious towards her and is actually one of the few people telling Daniel to stop distancing himself from Luce. She has an angelic appearance and is described as having a southern accent. She chose to side with God.
- Roland Sparks – Roland, like the others, is a fallen angel. He is Daniel's friend at the school. He, like Cam and Molly, are considered "demons," fallen angels who side with Lucifer, which surprises Luce as he isn't like the other two. He is much nicer and doesn't seem at all 'evil'. He is able to smuggle anything into Sword & Cross but it is unknown how.
- Mary Margaret 'Molly' Zane – Molly is another fallen angel who stayed mostly on Lucifer's side. She is very aggressive and antagonistic towards most of the students at the reform school. She tries to warn Luce away from Daniel several times. It is unknown why she wants to separate the two, but it could be due to the fact that she wants Daniel to choose Lucifer's side to tip the scales, and Luce is his distraction.
- Sophia Bliss – Miss Sophia is the school's librarian. She appears to like Luce and Penn, considering them good students. She teaches the Religion and has very strong beliefs on the subject. It is later discovered that she is in fact one of the 24 Elders of Zhsmaelin, a radical heavenly sect, and has the highest position. She turns out to be evil. She kills Penn and tries to kill Luce too until Daniel, Arianne and Gabbe save her. Sophia escapes.
- Randy – Randy is an attendant at Sword & Cross. She is described as being very masculine. She is human and has no knowledge of the fallen angels at the school.
- Callie – Callie is Luce's best friend from Dover Prep School, where she attended as a scholarship student before being sent to Sword & Cross. She and Luce are very close and she tries to keep in contact with Luce as much as possible. She is human and also has no knowledge of the Fallen Angels.
- Todd Hammond – Todd is a student who arrived at Sword & Cross at the same time that Luce did. He dies of a broken neck while helping Luce out of a burning building.
- Trevor – Trevor was Luce's almost-boyfriend before she went to Sword & Cross but he burned in a fire when he kissed Luce and then Luce was sent to Sword & Cross as she was blamed for starting the fire. It is unknown how the fire actually started.

Other characters include Mr Cole, who is one of the teachers to actually know about the Fallen Angels at the school, Luce's parents (who are clueless about Luce's past lives) and Annabelle, Arianne's sister, another Fallen Angel who chose the side of God.

== Legacy ==
=== Sequels ===
The series is six books long. The second book, Torment, was released on September 28, 2010. The third book, Passion, was released on June 14, 2011. The fourth book, Rapture, was released on June 12, 2012. Also released on January 24, 2012, was a side novel Fallen In Love which settles between the settings of Passion and Rapture. The sixth book, Unforgiven, was released on November 10, 2015. Original music was released to accompany the book.

=== Film version ===
A film based on the novel, starring Addison Timlin, Jeremy Irvine, Harrison Gilbertson, and Joely Richardson, was released November 10, 2016.

=== TV series ===
A TV series based on the novels began principal photography in fall 2022. The adaptation starred Alexander Siddig, Sarah Niles, Jessica Alexander, Gijs Blom and Timothy Innes. It was supposed to be released on Brazilian streaming service Globoplay sometime in 2023. The series was actually released in 2024.
