= Boulevard d'Athènes =

Boulevard in Marseille, France

Coordinates: 43.3002°N 5.3808°E

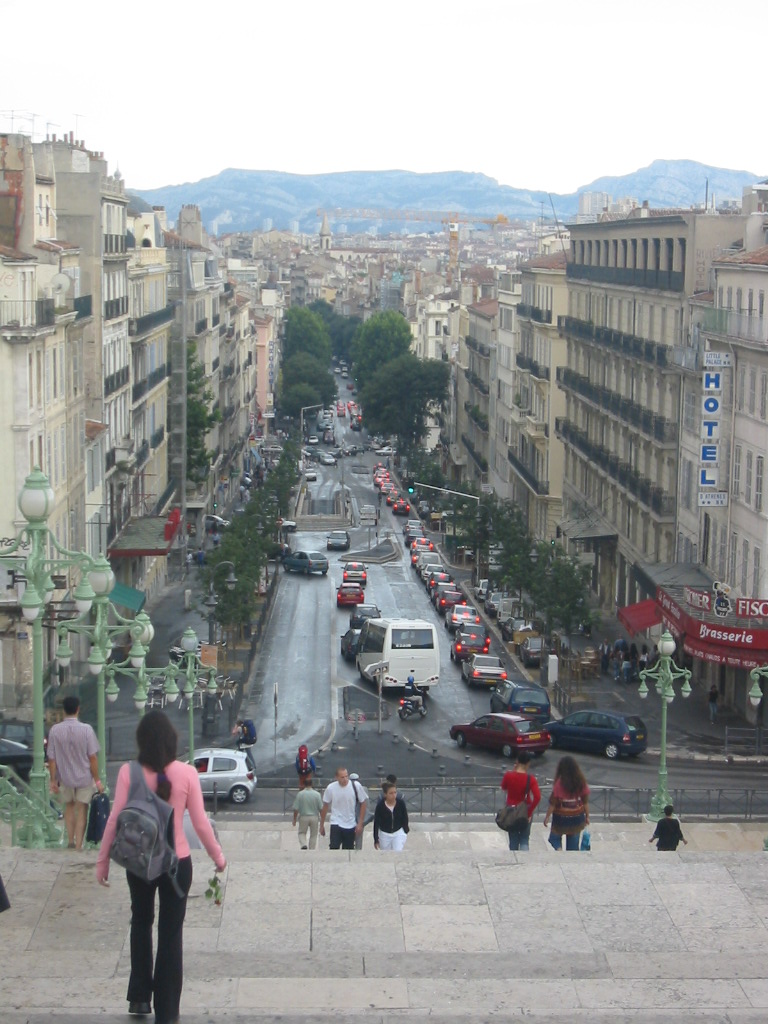
- The Boulevard d'Athènes in 2005
- Interactive map of Boulevard d'Athènes
- Location: Marseille, France

The Boulevard d'Athènes (French pronunciation: [bulvaʁ datɛn]) is a historic boulevard in Marseille, France. Situated in the 1st arrondissement of Marseille, it runs from the Rue Marcel Sembat (off the Gare de Marseille-Saint-Charles) to the Allée Léon Gambetta, where it becomes the Boulevard Dugommier and finally meets the Canebière.
