= Fallen (2016 film) =

2016 film by Scott Hicks

- Theatrical release poster
- Directed by: Scott Hicks
- Written by: Michael Ross; Kathryn Price; Nichole Millard
- Based on: Fallen by Lauren Kate
- Produced by: Mark Ciardi; Gordon Gray; Bill Johnson; Jim Seibel
- Starring: Addison Timlin; Jeremy Irvine; Harrison Gilbertson; Lola Kirke; Sianoa Smit-McPhee; Daisy Head; Hermione Corfield; Malachi Kirby; Chris Ashby; Joely Richardson
- Cinematography: Alar Kivilo
- Edited by: Scott Gray
- Music by: Mark Isham
- Production companies: Lotus Entertainment; Silver Reel; Mayhem Pictures; Apex Entertainment
- Distributed by: Relativity Media
- Release dates: August 25, 2016 (Southeast Asia); September 16, 2016 (United States)
- Running time: 92 minutes
- Countries: United States; Hungary
- Language: English
- Budget: $40 million
- Box office: $2.6 million

Fallen is a 2016 romantic fantasy drama film directed by Scott Hicks. It is based on the 2009 novel of the same name by Lauren Kate. The film stars Addison Timlin, Jeremy Irvine, Harrison Gilbertson, and Joely Richardson.

The film was released on November 10, 2016, in certain countries including Malaysia, Philippines and Singapore by Lotus Entertainment. Released to theaters in the United States on September 22, 2017, by Relativity Media, the film was a critical and commercial failure.

== Plot ==
Lucinda "Luce" Price is sent to Sword and Cross Academy for troubled young teens after she is blamed for the death of a boy named Trevor who perishes in a fire started by mysterious shadows that Luce sees after kissing him. Luce feels cursed, blaming herself for Trevor's death.

Upon arriving at her new school, Luce meets various students, including Cameron “Cam” Briel, who has taken an interest in her; Arriane Alter, who takes Luce under her wing; Molly Zane, who harasses Luce; Pennyweather "Penn” Van Syckle-Lockwood, who befriends Luce; and Daniel Grigori, a brooding boy to whom Luce is instantly attracted. She also meets Miss Sophia, a religious studies teacher. During a session, the school psychiatrist tells Lucinda she can leave if she takes antipsychotics.

During detention, picking up trash, Luce is almost crushed by a falling statue of an avenging angel. Later, Cam flirts with Luce before inviting her to a party in the woods. At the party, Luce is attracted to Cam, but can not shake the feeling of a deep and unusual connection to Daniel, despite his attempts to brush her off. Molly shows up and proceeds to harass and almost kill Luce before Arriane intervenes. As Luce leaves, she sees the “shadows” again.

Luce overhears Miss Sophia telling Daniel that Cam may have been behind the angel statue almost falling on Luce. She expresses fear for Luce because she is unbaptized. The two realize that Luce is listening to them, and Daniel follows Luce outside. They walk together and he admits that during class he was working on a graphic novel. In the story a boy and a girl are in love with each other, but are cursed such that each time they kiss, the girl dies; she then reincarnates, meets the boy (who never ages or changes) 17 years later, and they fall in love and kiss again, only for the cycle to repeat endlessly every 17 years.

Cam takes Luce to a club on her birthday and they kiss, only to be violently interrupted by Daniel, who yells that he had told Cam to stay away from Luce, and accuses him of still being “with Lucifer.” Luce flees and tells Penn what happened, confiding that she suspects Cam and she have been reincarnated. Penn and her friend Todd sneak into the library with Luce and search the computer with a facial recognition tool; they discover a photo from 1854 of Daniel and Luce, and Luce again has a flash of memory, seeing herself and Daniel posing for the photo in 1854. As Penn leaves to retrieve the photo from the printer, Luce sees the "shadows" again. Another mysterious fire breaks out; it engulfs the library and kills Todd. Daniel rescues an unconscious Luce from the fire.

Later, Luce finds Daniel on a roof top, and he reveals that they are the boy and girl from his graphic novel story. Daniel further reveals that he is a fallen angel, which explains his immortality. The two kiss, but Cam appears, telling Luce that because she has not been baptised, Lucifer will come for her. He tries to convince Luce to pick him instead of Daniel, but Daniel whisks Luce away and takes her to Miss Sophia, leaving to fight Cam and stop Lucifer from coming for Luce.

As the two fight, Cam reveals that he was not the one behind Luce's murders; meanwhile, Miss Sophia kills Penn. Luce screams, which brings Daniel to her aid and he protects her from Miss Sophia, who is revealed to be the one actually trying to kill Luce. Miss Sophia justifies her murders by explaining that, with Luce gone, Daniel would have been forced to choose a side and order would have been restored. The shadows appear behind Miss Sophia as she is talking and consume her.

Daniel explains to a shaken Luce that her being unbaptized would make her next death permanent; Miss Sophia thought this would cause Daniel to choose Heaven. He tells her that Lucifer will indeed come for her, and that he must take her somewhere safe. They declare their love for each other as they leave to find safe haven from Lucifer.

== Cast and characters ==
- Addison Timlin as Lucinda "Luce" Price
- Jeremy Irvine as Daniel Grigori
- Harrison Gilbertson as Cameron "Cam" Briel
- Daisy Head as Arriane Alter
- Lola Kirke as Pennyweather "Penn" Van Syckle-Lockwood
- Sianoa Smit-McPhee as Molly Zane
- Hermione Corfield as Gabrielle "Gabbe" Givens
- Malachi Kirby as Roland Sparks
- Joely Richardson as Sophia Bliss
- Juliet Aubrey as Doreen Price
- Paul Slack as Harry Price
- Leo Suter as Trevor Beckman
- Chris Ashby as Todd Hammond
- Auguszta Tóth as Todd Hammond's Mother
- David Schaal as Randy
- Norma Kuhling as Rachel
- Richard Ryan as Coach
- Rick Lipton as Detectives

== Production ==
=== Development ===
Walt Disney Pictures initially purchased rights to the series, excluding Unforgiven. By mid-2013, Disney withdrew from the project, leaving all production to Lotus Entertainment.

=== Pre-production ===
Pre-production began in September 2013, while filming began in February 2014 in Budapest, Hungary. Production was completed in April 2016, but the film was two years in pre-production. Origo Film Group studios in Budapest were chosen for the film's production, work on the "angels" flight scenes and the construction of exterior areas.

=== Casting ===
On August 16, 2013, two main characters were announced by writer Lauren Kate on their website. Addison Timlin was cast as Lucinda "Luce" Price and Jeremy Irvine would play Daniel Grigori. On September 25, 2013, it was officially announced that Harrison Gilbertson would play Cameron "Cam" Briel, the third main character. On January 19, 2014, it was officially announced that Sianoa Smit-McPhee would play "Molly", the antagonist.

=== Filming ===
After the change of producers, the producers and the director Scott Hicks settled upon Hungary as the primary location for production. Tura Castle, stood in for the main enclosure that would conform to Sword & Cross, together with the castle Wenckheim-kastély (Szabadkígyós) also located in Hungary. Subsequent filming was set to commence in September, but was delayed until February 9, 2014, in Budapest. There were five months of filming plus two extra weeks of voice recording between the end of July and August.

== Marketing and release ==
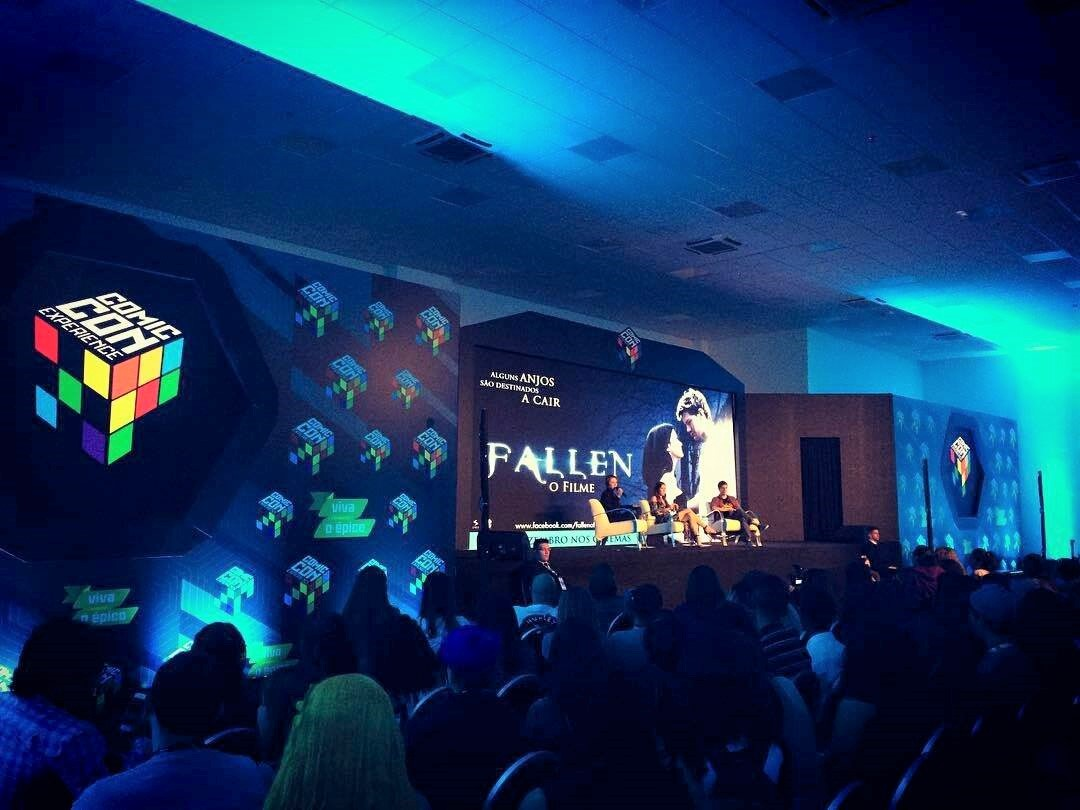
Lauren Kate and Addison Timlin at the Comic Con Experience in Brazil promoting the film in December 2016

By the end of 2016, the trailer for Fallen leaked in the Philippines, the first country to be chosen for the premiere of the film, with low resolution and poor quality of image and sound. Lotus Entertainment re-edited the trailer, modifying small scenes and include credits at the end after the leak.

Fallen initially did not have a distribution company. Later Relativity Media, acquired the film, after several days of negotiation. The premiere took place at the Philippines.

In December 2016, the film was promoted at the Brazilian Comic-Con Experience in São Paulo, where Fallen had its own panel. A press conference took place with Lauren Kate (writer of Fallen) and Addison Timlin (Lucinda Price). During the event the Brazilian trailer was shown for the fans.

The film was released in the United States on September 22, 2017, by Relativity Media. It then was made available on digital platforms on September 8, 2017, and to DVD on October 10, 2017.

== Reception ==
On review aggregator Rotten Tomatoes, the film has an approval rating of 7% based on 14 reviews, with an average rating of 3.2/10.

== Sequels ==
In December 2014, Relativity Media announced that Torment, the second installment in the Fallen book series, was in development. It is unknown whether the last two novels, Passion and Rapture, and the spin-off novels Fallen in Love and Unforgiven, were planned to be adapted.

== See also ==
- List of films about angels
