= Degeto Film =

German film production company

- Founded: 1928
- Headquarters: Frankfurt am Main, Germany
- Key people: Thomas Schreiber; Patricia Schlesinger
- Revenue: 14,800,000 (2016)
- Number of employees: 89 (2016)
- Website: degeto.de

Degeto Film GmbH (Deutsche Gesellschaft für Ton und Bild) is a film rights trader and production company of the ARD, based in Frankfurt am Main. Its shareholders are the regional broadcasting corporations of ARD or their advertising subsidiaries.

ARD Degeto acquires fictional programs for ARD's flagship national television channel Das Erste, the so called "Third Programmes" (TV channels) of the regional broadcasting corporations (BR, HR, MDR, NDR, Radio Bremen, RBB, SR, SWR, WDR), 3sat, Arte, One and the other ARD channels.

== History ==
The company was founded in 1928 as Deutsche Gesellschaft für Ton und Film e. V. and produced and distributed propaganda films for Hitler's Reich government in the 1930s and 1940s. It operated under the name Degeto – Kulturfilm G.m.b.H. from 1937, and from 1942 as Degeto Film GmbH. After reactivation in 1952 by the state of North Rhine-Westphalia and Hessischer Rundfunk (HR), the company was initially owned by Werbung im Rundfunk GmbH, a subsidiary of HR, from 1954 and was jointly taken over by the ARD broadcasters in 1959.

== See also ==
- Degeto Weltspiegel
