= List of The Tunnel episodes =

The Tunnel (French: Tunnel) is a British-French crime drama television series adapted from the 2011 Danish/Swedish crime series The Bridge (Broen/Bron). The series premiered on 16 October 2013 on Sky Atlantic in the United Kingdom, and on 11 November 2013 on Canal+ in France. The Tunnel stars Stephen Dillane and Clémence Poésy as British and French police detectives Karl Roebuck and Elise Wassermann, respectively.

Series 1 follows the two detectives working together to find a serial killer who left the upper-half body of a French politician and the lower-half of a British prostitute in the Channel Tunnel, at the midpoint between France and the UK.

The renewal for a second series was announced on 15 February 2015. Titled The Tunnel: Sabotage, the series premiered on Canal+ on 7 March 2016, followed by Sky Atlantic on 12 April 2016 (the series was originally scheduled to debut in the UK on 5 April, but was delayed for a week due to the Brussels terrorist attacks on 22 March 2016). Series 2 focuses on the crash of an airliner into the French channel.

The third and final series was announced on 20 January 2017. The Tunnel: Vengeance consists of six episodes. Series 3 premiered on Sky Atlantic on 14 December 2017, with all episodes released on the same day. The series premiered on Canal+ on 4 June 2018.

== Series overview ==
Series	Episodes	Originally released		
Series	Episodes	First released	Last released	Network
1	10	16 October 2013	18 December 2013	Sky Atlantic
2	8	7 March 2016	28 March 2016	Canal+
3	6	14 December 2017		Sky Atlantic

== Episodes ==
=== Series 1 (2013) ===
No. overall	No. in series	Title	Directed by	Written by	British air date	French air date	UK viewers (millions)
1	1	"Episode 1"	Dominik Moll	Ben Richards	16 October 2013	11 November 2013	0.893 (Note: Combined total of 803,000 Sky Atlantic + 90,000 Sky Atlantic +1)
Newly missing French politician Marie Villeneuve is found dead, straddling the Channel Tunnel's midpoint at the international boundary between France and the UK. Karl Roebuck and Elise Wassermann, the respective British and French detectives, are called to the scene, but Elise assumes jurisdiction because the victim was French. However, the body is then found to have been cut in half, one half on the British side actually belonging to Welsh prostitute Gemma Kirwan whose corpse had been frozen for at least 6 months. Karl and Elise work together to investigate the killings and soon find a possible suspect in Charlotte Joubert, the wife of French banker Alain who is in hiding. Charlotte insists that she made threats against Villeneuve to stop her from badgering Alain. In the UK, Stephen Beaumont runs a hostel for failed asylum seekers and takes in Colombian-born Veronica. Tabloid journalist Danny Hillier enters his car and finds it locking him in and rigged with explosives. When the explosives' timer reaches zero, however, instead of an explosion, the killer has left a message.
2	2	"Episode 2"	Dominik Moll	Ben Richards	23 October 2013	11 November 2013	N/A
A killer's video states that the killings were the first of five "truths", in this case inequality before the law represented by the different treatments of the cases of the politician and the prostitute. Alain Joubert is run over by a high-speed train while fleeing pursuers. Stephen Beaumont moves Veronica and her young son to a rural cottage to protect her from Anthony, Gemma Kirwan's pimp. Karl investigates Kirwan's disappearance, while Elise examines threats against Villeneuve. A coroner's observation that the victims were cut with a abattoir saw leads her to an anti-Zionist farmer. Although she finds part of Villeneuve's body at the farm, Elise rules out the farmer, who cannot speak English. The killer next targets the elderly for his "second truth" of their neglect and poisons the medication of retirement home residents. Care worker Suze Beaumont, Stephen's sister and Anthony's lover, who steals drugs from the residents for intoxication, also falls victim.
3	3	"Episode 3"	Udayan Prasad	Olivier Kohn & Ben Richards	30 October 2013	18 November 2013	0.709 (Note: Combined total of 626,000 Sky Atlantic + 83,000 Sky Atlantic +1)
Using journalist Hillier to spread his message, the so-called "Truth Terrorist" (TT) vows to continue his "second truth" in France, kidnapping veteran Jean-Claude Delplanque and livestreaming his victim's ordeal. A young runaway couple find Delplanque, but TT captures them. Anthony instructs Veronica to run away to London, and troubled teenager Sophie Campbell runs away from her mother and is taken in by Benji, an eccentric but outwardly trustworthy person. Karl and Elise find out that Delplanque is being kept in a cold-storage unit and is slowly freezing to death. TT emails Hillier the photographs of four wealthy business people who, he says, can save Delplanque.
4	4	"Episode 4"	Udayan Prasad	Chris Lang	6 November 2013	18 November 2013	0.596 (Note: Combined total of 551,000 Sky Atlantic + 45,000 Sky Atlantic +1)
TT demands that the four business people make a significant donation to charity. Charlotte Joubert, one of those named, discovers her late husband's second family. She agrees to pay on behalf of the other plutocrats in order to eliminate all trace of Alain. Meanwhile, French police notice vibrations on the livestream from the site where the kidnapping victim is being held, and audio analysis shows are caused by specific types of passing trains, narrowing Delplanque's location to two cold stores. Karl and Elise search one, but TT subdues Karl and escapes. Delplanque is dead; the runaway couple are found alive. Elise suspects that TT may know Karl because Karl has recently had a vasectomy and TT kicked him in the groin. Sophie starts to believe that Benji is mentally ill after finding a cupboard of unused prescription drugs. Benji's samurai-style suicide mission is foreshadowed as he wields a katana provided to him by TT.
5	5	"Episode 5"	Hettie MacDonald	Yann Le Niver	13 November 2013	25 November 2013	0.534 (Note: Combined total of 474,000 Sky Atlantic + 60,000 Sky Atlantic +1)
To carry out TT's the "third truth", Benji beheads several people, then kills himself after his arrest. Karl revisits Charlotte Joubert regarding Alain's encrypted files, and she seduces Karl. Back home, he learns that his wife Laura is pregnant. Karl and Elise have to track down Sophie before she is found by TT. They find her in an internet café. Elise uses Sophie to entrap TT and saves Sophie from his attack with a sniper rifle. Karl's colleague Chuks Akinade finds a picture of Gemma Kirwan on Beaumont's computer. Now a suspect, Beaumont murders Anthony. TT kidnaps French police officer Laurent Delgado, who has been accused of murdering a teenager named Mehdi Cherfi.
6	6	"Episode 6"	Hettie MacDonald	George Kay	20 November 2013	25 November 2013	0.575 (Note: Combined total of 514,000 Sky Atlantic + 61,000 Sky Atlantic +1)
Cornered on a Calais-bound ferry, Beaumont admits to killing Anthony, then kills himself. TT demonstrates his "fourth truth" concerning the neglect of youth by burning alive four youths who had been arrested during the 2011 England riots. Laura learns of Karl's affair with Charlotte, while Karl learns that his son Adam has spent the night at Elise's flat. Calais police find out that French youths, including Mehdi Cherfi, had been killed in a riot. TT lures Mehdi's brother Yassin to an abandoned shop, where Laurent Delgado is imprisoned and is forced to confess to killing Mehdi. Yassin returns home, where he is intercepted by Karl and Elise. Mehdi's father later finds the imprisoned Delgado too, but releases him instead of exacting revenge. TT shoots Delgado dead and burns Danny's girlfriend alive after Danny had refused his demand to publish a text.
7	7	"Episode 7"	Philip Martin	Emma Frost	27 November 2013	2 December 2013	0.537 (Note: Combined total of 485,000 Sky Atlantic + 52,000 Sky Atlantic +1)
Due to TT's knowledge of police procedures, Karl and Elise think he is likely to be a police officer. Delgado's widow suspects a colleague from training exercises. ZP Holdings had financed the officers, but its offices are deserted. TT hijacks a minibus and holds school children at a farm. For his "final truth", relating to child exploitation, he urges the public to attack department stores that use child labour. He releases some of the children after such attacks and asks the public to "vote" on which of two remaining captives should die. Ultimately, he lets them both live and murders the minibus driver. TT lures Hillier, offering an interview, but instead kills him with a bomb. Elise's colleague Cécile Cabrillac works out the identity of a police officer who could be TT: Fabien Vincent.
8	8	"Episode 8"	Thomas Vincent	Ben Richards	4 December 2013	2 December 2013	0.555 (Note: Combined total of 472,000 Sky Atlantic + 83,000 Sky Atlantic +1)
The Direction centrale du renseignement intérieur hinders the hunt for Fabien Vincent, who had helped investigate ZP Holdings over suspected gun-running. Karl discovers the murdered Hillier was originally Giles Haddock. Before his name change, he had been involved in a drunk driving incident that killed the wife and child of Kieran Ashton, a former colleague of Karl. Vincent kidnaps Elise, proves to her that he is not TT, and reveals his role in "Peloton", a joint operation of several European intelligence agencies; killing Alain Joubert had been one of their assignments. After escaping from gangsters, Vincent releases Elise. Attention now turns to Kieran Ashton, who had faked his apparent suicide, as likely to be TT.
9	9	"Episode 9"	Thomas Vincent	Chris Lang	11 December 2013	9 December 2013	0.535 (Note: Combined total of 462,000 Sky Atlantic + 73,000 Sky Atlantic +1)
Calais police trace Kieran Ashton's bank records following his supposed death, leading them to a John Sumner, who has befriended Laura. After identifying Sumner/Ashton as the Truth Terrorist, Karl and Elise go to his home, where they learn that Laura is his next target because of Karl's onetime affair with Ashton's wife. TT takes Laura and her children on a day outing and traps her in an empty house, making her keep her foot on the trigger of an improvised explosive device. The bomb disposal squad reveals that the device cannot be disarmed but was not designed to detonate almost immediately on release of the switch. Stepping off the trigger, Laura is able to run out of the house before it explodes. Adam sneaks out to meet his online girlfriend who has supposedly just returned from South Africa, unaware that TT is impersonating her to entrap him, and Elise realises that Adam is TT's real target.
10	10	"Episode 10"	Thomas Vincent	Ben Richards	18 December 2013	9 December 2013	0.660 (Note: Combined total of 559,000 Sky Atlantic + 101,000 Sky Atlantic +1)
Ashton kidnaps Adam and leads Karl to several dead ends in his search for his son. Karl resigns from the case, acquires the Mauser C96 pistol that his grandfather used in the Spanish Civil War, and begins searching for Ashton alone. At his hideout, Ashton murders Adam with a fatal dose of morphine. Discovering that Ashton had also been a Peloton operative, Elise then learns the location of Peloton's safe house in England, where she finds Adam's body. Ashton arranges a meeting with Karl at a Channel Tunnel ventilation shaft near Folkestone; he reveals to Karl that Adam is dead. Elise realises that Ashton wants Karl to kill him as a way of bringing his "mission" to an end, and she goes to the ventilation shaft to persuade Karl not to do so. She tries to convince him that Adam is still alive, but Karl realizes the truth. Surrounded by armed officers, Elise talks him out of killing Ashton. During a struggle, Ashton is blinded when the pistol discharges. After Ashton's arrest, Karl decides to leave the police force and mourns Adam's death.

=== Series 2: Sabotage (2016) ===
No. overall	No. in series	Title	Directed by	Written by	French air date	British air date	UK viewers (millions)
11	1	"Episode 1"	Mike Barker	Ben Richards	7 March 2016	12 April 2016	0.706 (Note: Combined total of 680,000 Sky Atlantic + 26,000 Sky Atlantic +1)
Following the events of the first series, Karl Roebuck joins the Police's Public Protection Unit (PPU) to help special victims. Elise Wasserman has been promoted to Commander and takes charge of her unit following the departure of her former boss Olivier Pujol. Rosa Persaud and Thibaut Briand kidnap Madeleine and Robert Fournier on a Channel Tunnel train. They leave behind the Fourniers' daughter Chloë, who comes under Karl's care. He is soon reunited with Elise, who is sent to investigate the kidnapping. Supposed victim Robert is revealed as the plot's leader. He murders his wife. Later the gang hacks into a plane's autopilot system, forcing it to crash into the English Channel, killing all on board. Robert is then paid off by human trafficker Vanessa Hamilton.
12	2	"Episode 2"	Mike Barker	Ben Richards	7 March 2016	19 April 2016	0.506 (Note: Combined total of 466,000 Sky Atlantic + 40,000 Sky Atlantic +1)
As the authorities assemble the plane wreckage, Karl returns to the Criminal Investigation Division from PPU. Olivier informs Elise that the plane was likely hacked, but tells her not to divulge this for the time being. Chloë recalls overhearing Robert say, "I told you – not the kid", leaving Karl and Elise to ponder the context of the phrase. Meanwhile, Robert sends Thibaut Briand to "Fun Faith Friends", an interfaith meet-up between British and French Christians, Jews and Muslims in Calais, to kill one member from each faith. On arrival, Thibaut immediately shoots and kills a priest and a rabbi, and after some difficulty locating a Muslim, eventually kills Aamira, a teenage girl. Back in England, Karl and Boleslaw "BB" Borowski find out that the burned van had been stolen. They trace credit card charges to an oil depot, where an employee gives out a detailed description of a female suspect. The description is released to the press, and well-known radical professor Sonny Persaud recognises the suspect as his estranged daughter.
13	3	"Episode 3"	Gilles Bannier	Ben Richards	14 March 2016	26 April 2016	0.462 (Note: Combined total of 438,000 Sky Atlantic + 24,000 Sky Atlantic +1)
Sonny tells the police that the woman they're seeking is his daughter Rosa, whom he suspects of alignment with anarchist groups. Sonny also reveals that Robert was an unsuccessful student of his. Karl and BB trace Rosa's movements to a shack, where they find Madeleine's body. The search leads to Singapore Fiscal Management, a company that owns the land. Elise's colleagues search offices in Calais where they find Rosa and Thibaut, capturing Rosa following a shootout. Laura Roebuck suspects she is being stalked because of her tweets condemning a politician who supports fracking. Immigration officers arrest a Georgian woman, Olena Bahkia, in Dover; she carries a passport that features the same key as several other passports in the plane's wreckage. One of the victims was a Polish detective who went to the UK to expose a human trafficking ring. Karl and Elise try to question Olena at PPU but are prevented from doing so by Karl's boss Mike Bowden. Later, a couple witness Olena falling to her death.
14	4	"Episode 4"	Gilles Bannier	Yann Le Nivet & Ben Richards	14 March 2016	3 May 2016	0.334 (Note: Combined total of 301,000 Sky Atlantic + 33,000 Sky Atlantic +1)
Olena's death is ruled as a suicide, but Karl believes she was pushed. The detectives also find a link between Singapore Fiscal Management and Vanessa Hamilton. Olena having told Karl that her abductor smoked cheroots, Karl suspects Hamilton when BB tells him she was smoking one during questioning. Karl and Elise question Rosa, who initially remains silent, but Elise manages to get under her skin by mentioning her mother's sexual relationship with Robert. In her anger, Rosa implies that Robert's group will target her father at Lille University. That turns out to be a diversion so that Thibaut can storm the police station, with racist officer Garrido as an inside man, in an attempt to break Rosa free. With the sooner-than-expected arrival of armed back-up, Garrido is ordered to execute wounded fellow officer Julie, but he fires above her head. Rosa and Thibaut take hostages and demand Karl and Elise be brought to them. Elise comes into the office alone, and Rosa assaults her for taunting her. Olivier sends in armed officers who shoot both hostage takers. Julie narrowly survives her injuries and is taken to intensive care, where the guilt-ridden Garrido shoots himself, leaving a note for Elise.
15	5	"Episode 5"	Tim Mielants	Louise Ironside	21 March 2016	10 May 2016	0.334 (Note: Combined total of 289,000 Sky Atlantic + 45,000 Sky Atlantic +1)
Rosa survives the shooting but refuses to tell Karl and Elise the whereabouts of Robert. After Sonny talks to her, she confesses that Robert is responsible for the plane hacking, and she mentions the name "Koba" before dying from sepsis. Forensics recovers a mobile phone from the police station, and they trace Robert's location. Karl and Elise search the docks, but Elise spots the corpse of a woman floating on the water who was killed by Robert. Elise freezes at this reminder of her twin sister's childhood drowning, allowing Robert to escape as he phones "Koba" to get safe passage. Karl later questions Hamilton, but Bowden stops him, claiming she is the subject of a separate investigation that is "bigger than us". Laura makes a new friend at work, who later claims that Karl had a child with her when he worked undercover years earlier. Knowing Karl's previous transgressions with women, Laura believes her, angrily confronts Karl and declares their marriage over.
16	6	"Episode 6"	Tim Mielants	Franck Philippon & Ben Richards	21 March 2016	17 May 2016	0.338 (Note: Combined total of 315,000 Sky Atlantic + 23,000 Sky Atlantic +1)
Karl and Elise find a link between the dead Polish detective and Gregor Baturin, an imprisoned Georgian arms dealer. His son Artem/"Koba" is sheltering Robert. They also discover that other victims of the plane crash were linked with Baturin, though not Eryka Klein, who had failed to board the fateful flight due to her missing passport. Eryka goes for drinks with Elise, where she confirms that she grew up with her twin brother in Chile's notorious Colonia Dignidad, and that she had been sexually abused there. Karl relentlessly pursues the truth, prompting Bowden to hand Karl a drive on Vanessa Hamilton's case revealing that Hamilton is an MI5 informant with ties to Baturin's organisation. Hamilton finds herself on the run when a van of men arrive outside her home. Robert escapes from Artem when he discovers he will not be allowed to brag to the world about crashing the plane. He is quickly recaptured by Artem and sent to a sadistic modern Nazi, "The Chemist", who once lived at Colonia Dignidad. Robert is injected with Crimean-Congo hemorrhagic fever and dies slowly and in agonising pain. BB later discovers his corpse in a car park.
17	7	"Episode 7"	Carl Tibbetts	Ben Richards	28 March 2016	24 May 2016	0.323 (Note: Combined total of 289,000 Sky Atlantic + 34,000 Sky Atlantic +1)
Karl and Elise take Vanessa Hamilton to France for questioning, but she is killed by a poisoned cheroot before they can get much information. Laura learns of Gemma's relationship with Kieran Ashton ; Gemma's story had been fabricated to destroy Karl’s marriage. Laura and Karl make their peace. Eryka initiates sex with Elise after learning that Gael, Elise's sometime boyfriend, has left her. Artem negotiates his father's early release from prison and meets with Eryka, revealing that she is indeed his accomplice. Karl learns the identity of "The Chemist", Dr Edgar Branco, and his ties to Baturin’s organisation. Elise’s team discover that Eryka purchased the phone used to hack into the downed plane’s autopilot. When Elise suggests this is meaningless, Karl realises that Elise has romantic feelings for Eryka. She reacts defensively but agrees to look at the evidence. That night, Karl and Laura are awoken by their dog’s barking; carbon monoxide has leaked into their house. Thinking it was an attempt to kill him, Karl re-enters his house after sending his family to hospital and, knowing that MI5 are listening, tells them that he will never walk away from the investigation.
18	8	"Episode 8"	Carl Tibbetts	Ben Richards	28 March 2016	31 May 2016	0.316 (Note: Combined total of 286,000 Sky Atlantic + 30,000 Sky Atlantic +1)
Karl confronts MI5 agent Neil Grey, who assures him that the carbon monoxide leak wasn't planned. Grey asks him not to arrest Artem/"Koba" for the plane crash, because Artem is using "The Chemist", who poses a major threat to national security, as leverage for his father Gregor. Eryka escapes after telling Elise that Eryka assisted in the plane crash and that she has no feelings for her. When Gregor dies of a heart attack, Artem assumes duplicity by MI5 and plans revenge. Evidence leads Karl and Elise to "The Chemist," but Artem's men capture them. When Eryka hears Artem order "The Chemist" to kill them with a deadly plague, she alerts MI5 in order to save Elise. Moments after "The Chemist" injects a pathogen into Elise's eye, police storm the apartment. Elise is rushed to hospital. Grey summarily executes "The Chemist." Karl and Olivier arrest Artem as he boards a helicopter. Grey helps Eryka onto the helicopter as payment for leading them to both "Koba" and "The Chemist." Karl tells the recovering Elise that information about the plane's hacking will be suppressed to avoid panic, but Artem will face justice. Elise later dreams of Eryka returning to her.

=== Series 3: Vengeance (2017) ===
No. overall	No. in series	Title	Directed by	Written by	British air date	French air date	UK viewers (millions)
19	1	"Episode 1"	Anders Engström	Emilia di Girolamo	14 December 2017	4 June 2018	(Note: 230,000 on Wednesday and 164,000 on Thursday)
Karl Roebuck and Elise Wasserman investigate events linked to the Pied Piper legend: a boat in mid-Channel is set on fire but refugee children aboard are missing; a maintenance worker is attacked by rats in the Tunnel; and three children from the middle-class Kent home of the Carvers are abducted. The missing refugee children are found drugged in the Carver children's beds. Karl and BB investigate the boat and find an injured man, Behar Dibra, a French trafficker. Karl's new boss, Winnie Miles, shunts the case to the French authorities. Elise had decided to voluntarily step down (due to events in Series 2) and was replaced by Commander Astor Chaput. She is concerned how Astor manipulates a task force to reduce crime statistics, which falsely makes him look more efficient. She investigates the rat attack. Jacques Moreau is in jail for his son's murder. The son, Charlie Moreau, turns up alive when Karl and Elise investigate a children's hostel run by Betti Baudin. Charlie is recognised by Elise, who had arrested Jacques eight years earlier. Elise tells Karl she has bruxism and is losing teeth; her dentist recommended she see a therapist. Karl reveals he has left Laura; Maya is temporarily staying with him.
20	2	"Episode 2"	Anders Engström	Louise Ironside	14 December 2017	4 June 2018	(Note: 179,000 on Thursday)
Jacques is released from jail. The team analyse a video posted by the Pied Piper: they are ordered to find Saban Khasanović. BB goes to Calais to liaise with the French police. Saban was a child, taken as a trafficking victim, during the Bosnian conflict in the mid-1990s. Elise finds a toy car on Behar's boat, which leads to an immigration removal centre. The Carver children are found in a laundry basket, sedated but otherwise okay. Anton Stokes and his sister, Kiki, were close after being abandoned by their suicidal mother as children. Kiki is pregnant by her abrasive partner, Blake Jenkins. Anton and Lana Khasanović are lovers. Five men are lured to a flesh show: Lana dances (a solo version of danse macabre) wearing a gas mask. The men are drugged, told to strip, forced to watch a murder, and subjected to torture including having numbers branded on their rumps. Lawrence Taylor, a call centre worker, appears in embarrassing viral videos; he is labelled the "DonutNut". The videos were hacked from his computer, but he is sacked from his job. He trolled others to sow racism, sexism and xenophobia. BB and his French counterpart, Louise, investigate rat suppliers potentially used by the Pied Piper. Karl's mother-in-law, Celeste, arrives to look after Maya and encounters Elise, who is staying over.
21	3	"Episode 3"	Anders Engström	Jamie Crichton	14 December 2017	11 June 2018	(Note: 136,000 on Wednesday and 290,000 on Thursday)
One of the danse macabre victims, Wesley Pollinger ("the Labourer"), is an immigration lawyer who had refused to help Lana. He was released naked, distressed, and confused. Another victim is Blake ("the King"), who has repeatedly neglected and lied to Kiki. Winnie is sent a live rat; a note provides the location of an underground chamber where the danse macabre victims had been held. Photos show the victims as representing the wrongs of society. Aside from Wesley and Lawrence, the photos are Father Francis Paine ("the Pope"), Anton's local priest; Saban ("the Child"), Lana's lost son; and Gary Green ("the Soldier"), her former boss at a meat works. The chamber leads to Lawrence's mutilated, dead body with parts missing. Francis is found hanged. Gary claims he never went but his meat works are shut down and tested for human remains. Elise tests the drug on herself, with Karl safeguarding her. She determines that Wesley lied about not remembering; Wesley now reveals more details. BB and Louise follow victims of the DonutNut's trolling including Anton, which leads to Blake. The pair later encounter Lana at a sea-side caravan park, but BB is seriously injured: she bayonets him and then rolls him off a cliff.
22	4	"Episode 4"	Gilles Bannier	John Jackson	14 December 2017	11 June 2018	(Note: 155,000 on Thursday)
Lana stays at a blind woman's home, where she had worked as a domestic. Karl and Elise interview Kiki, who describes Anton's website: Wall of the Missing (WotM). Karl posts a message to Lana there and later sets up a meeting. Karl and Elise interview Edith Dutheil, who ran a children's home; she remembers Saban but tells them he died soon after leaving. Elise continues to investigate Charlie's case despite being warned off by Astor. She reconstructs Charlie's disappearance, with Jacques along, to help the boy remember. Anton accesses Lana's WotM page, sees Karl's message, and trails him. Karl removes a knitted jacket from the evidence locker. Edith warns restaurateur Jean-Marc Sargent that police are looking for his (adoptive) son, François Sargent (the adult Saban). Charlie remembers following a cat to a man in front of Hôtel L'Écrin. Karl is concerned about Elise's continuance with Charlie's case and phones her former boss, Olivier. Karl meets Lana at a dance hall, where he hands over the jacket and tells her Saban died. Anton sends her a message to say it's a trap, he rejoins Lana and they run off together. Astor suspends Elise over the re-enactment: she argues with Karl and that disputes his friendship as interfering in her life.
23	5	"Episode 5"	Gilles Bannier	Emilia di Girolamo	14 December 2017	18 June 2018	(Note: 2x on Thursday: 98,000 and 93,000)
Eleven people are abducted from the Folkestone area over the course of a day. Karl tries to apologise to Elise, but she does not answer her phone. Olivier castigates Astor for her suspension and takes over Charlie's case. Karl tracks down the missing Saban/François, who has not been told of his adoption: he is due to marry. Jean-Marc pleads with Karl not to use François in the investigation. Astor protected Hôtel L'Écrin's residents from interviews in Charlie's case. Astor's father, Josef Chaput (a former police chief), tells him that the police had an informant there. Karl arrives at Elise's flat, finds it empty, he picks up her mobile, and notes signs of a struggle. Karl and Olivier find Jacques, who made threats against Elise, but he is ruled out as a suspect after Charlie provides an alibi. Kayla, Maya's older school friend, takes an overdose after nude photos from her phone are published on the internet; Maya had sent them. BB, disabled and confined to desk duties, leads a search for the missing people, including Dayton Barr, a meat truck driver. All 11 kidnapped people are in the truck, now driven by Anton, and are slowly being gassed. Elise is in there as well, tied up but with a gas mask on.
24	6	"Episode 6"	Gilles Bannier	Emilia di Girolamo	14 December 2017	18 June 2018	(Note: 65,000 on Wednesday)
Karl searches for Elise and trails the Pied Pipers, Anton and Lana, to the missing truck. Lana remains in their car. Anton watches from above and phones Karl's mobile. Karl finds Elise near the meat truck locked into a collar bomb. She warns him not to get closer. Talking to Anton, Karl is directed to a bomb switch. He tells Anton that Saban is found alive, so there is no reason for the people to die. Anton does not tell Lana, wanting to force Karl to choose between saving Elise or the 11 gassing victims. When Karl has difficulty deciding whom to save, Elise explodes the bomb, killing herself and opening the truck. Karl is then in a car chase, in which the Pied Pipers are attempting to run off a cliff to their deaths. Karl rams their car and explains to Lana that Saban is alive. She shoots and kills Anton. Hôtel L'Écrin was a front for a paedophile ring, which took Charlie and was protected by paying off Astor's father, Josef. Astor arrests his father and resigns. Later, Karl visits Lana in prison, but does not meet with Saban. He gives her photos of him as François, growing up with his adoptive parents. In the final scene, Karl and Laura have now reconciled. While walking through a fun house mirror maze, Karl sees Elise's image, smiling for the first time.
