= Final Portrait =

- Theatrical release poster
- Directed by: Stanley Tucci
- Written by: Stanley Tucci
- Produced by: Nik Bower; Gail Egan; Ilann Girard
- Starring: Geoffrey Rush; Armie Hammer; Clémence Poésy; Tony Shalhoub; James Faulkner; Sylvie Testud
- Cinematography: Danny Cohen
- Edited by: Camilla Toniolo
- Music by: Evan Lurie
- Production companies: Olive Productions; Potboiler Productions; Riverstone Pictures
- Distributed by: Vertigo Releasing (United Kingdom and Ireland); Sony Pictures Classics (United States)
- Release dates: February 11, 2017 (Berlin); August 18, 2017 (United Kingdom); March 23, 2018 (United States)
- Running time: 90 minutes
- Countries: United Kingdom; United States
- Language: English
- Box office: $1.7 million

Final Portrait is a 2017 comedy-drama film written and directed by Stanley Tucci. The film stars Geoffrey Rush, Armie Hammer, Clémence Poésy, Tony Shalhoub, James Faulkner, and Sylvie Testud. The film had its world premiere at the Berlin International Film Festival on 11 February 2017. The film was released in the United Kingdom on August 18, 2017, by Vertigo Releasing. The film was released in the United States on 23 March 2018 by Sony Pictures Classics.

== Plot ==
In Paris 1964, famed sculptor Alberto Giacometti bumps into his old friend James Lord, an American critic, and asks him to be a model for his latest portrait in his studio for a couple of days. Flattered by the request, Lord complies and is told that only two days are needed to do the portrait. Giacometti lives with his wife Annette and also with his brother Diego at his studio which he also uses as a home. Giacometti also has a favorite muse whom he uses as a model and part time concubine who is the source of some tension in his home.

When the two days pass, Giacometti requests that the sittings with Lord continue for another week. Lord is busy and needs to return to his work back home, though the chance to have his portrait done by Giacometti entices him to stay. He delays his departure accordingly and puts off his writing assignments. Giacometti's progress on the portrait appears to move in starts and stops. Often he is in the habit of simply blanking out the face to start over again. Lord keeps making photos of the progress, but the progress often is stifled when Giacometti completely rethinks his approach and restarts the portrait from scratch.

Giacometti's relationship with his wife oscillates between genuinely caring for her while requiring that he also have the freedoms implied by having an open marriage. Annette is clearly disturbed by these vacillations in his affections and considers him to be niggardly in the affection which he shows her over the years. At one point she confronts him about being extravagant with his money when it comes to his models and courtesans, while at the same time being stingy about even buying her a coat. Annette reminds him that he has money now that he is a successful artist and insists on getting some attention. Giacometti goes into a rage and reminds her that he does have money and begins casually flinging stacks of bills at her for her new coat. The effect is counterproductive and his wife is still displeased with his keeping courtesans around his studio and in his home.

The progress on the portrait continues very slowly as one week passes into a second week and a third week. Giacometti decides that he will now purchase a convertible for his model courtesan as she has become his primary muse for his artistry. He and Lord and the courtesan go out for a night on the town once her convertible arrives and when they get home, Giacometti finds that his studio has been ransacked. He appears to know what has happened and tells Lord that he must go to sort this out the next day.

In the morning, Giacometti takes Lord with him to visit a local bar where he is to meet up with the male manager who is minding the affairs of Giacometti's favorite courtesan. Giacometti gladly pays him the "fees" which he requires for the services of the courtesan, and he pays for her services in advance. Both Giacometti and the manager are pleased with the arrangement and apparently Giacometti and his premises are to be left intact without further disruption in the coming months ahead. Lord is becoming concerned for the long delays with the portrait and tries to recruit Giacometti's brother to assist him in getting his brother to work a little faster, though his brother completely refuses to do anything like this knowing his brother's prickly temperament.

As the portrait painting enters a stage Giacometti finds to be "the beginning" of a good work, Lord announces he must return to New York. Lord eventually departs for his office abroad and Giacometti sends the portrait to New York for an exhibition organized by Lord, also telephoning him and asking Lord to come back soon so they can finish the portrait one day. Shortly after Giacometti dies, and Lord reflects on what to him was a first hand witnessed account of the artistic process of Giacometti's genius of artistry at work.

== Cast ==
- Geoffrey Rush as Alberto Giacometti
- Armie Hammer as James Lord
- Clémence Poésy as Caroline
- Tony Shalhoub as Diego Giacometti
- James Faulkner as Pierre Matisse
- Sylvie Testud as Annette Giacometti

== Production ==
On 2 February 2015 Geoffrey Rush joined the cast of the film, with Armie Hammer following on 15 May. On 12 February 2016 Tony Shalhoub, Clémence Poésy and Sylvie Testud joined the cast. Principal photography began on 15 February 2016.

== Release ==
The film had its world premiere at the Berlin International Film Festival on February 11, 2017. Shortly after, Vertigo Releasing and Sony Pictures Classics acquired U.K. and U.S. distribution rights to the film, respectively. It was released in the United Kingdom on August 18, 2017.

The film had its American premiere at South by Southwest on March 9, 2018, and went into wider release on March 23, 2018.

== Reception ==
Final Portrait received positive reviews from film critics. It holds a 73% approval rating on review aggregator website Rotten Tomatoes, based on 131 reviews, and an average rating of 6.6/10. The website's critical consensus reads, ""Final Portrait finds writer-director Stanley Tucci patiently telling a quietly absorbing story, brought to life by a talented ensemble led by Geoffrey Rush and Armie Hammer. On Metacritic, the film holds a rating of 70 out of 100, based on 32 critics, indicating "generally favorable" reviews.
