= The Tunnel (TV series) =

Crime drama series, 2013–2017

- Also known as: Tunnel
- French: Tunnel
- English: The Tunnel
- Genre: Crime drama
- Based on: The Bridge
- Developed by: Ben Richards; Hans Rosenfeldt
- Written by: Emma Frost; George Kay; Olivier Kohn; Chris Lang; Yann Le Nivert; Ben Richards; Emilia di Girolamo
- Directed by: Hettie MacDonald; Philip Martin; Dominik Moll; Udayan Prasad; Thomas Vincent
- Starring: Stephen Dillane; Clémence Poésy; Angel Coulby; Thibault de Montalembert; Cédric Vieira; Thibaut Evrard; William Ash; Juliette Navis; Fanny Leurent
- Opening theme: "The End of Time" – sung by Charlotte Gainsbourg
- Composers: Adrian Johnston; Ben Bartlett
- Countries of origin: United Kingdom; France
- Original languages: English; French
- No. of series: 3
- No. of episodes: 24 (list of episodes)

Production
- Executive producers: Lars Blomgren; Jane Featherstone; Manda Levin; Nora Melhli; Anne Mensah; Fabrice De La Patellière; Karen Wilson; Emilia di Girolamo
- Producer: Ruth Kenley-Letts
- Production locations: United Kingdom; France
- Running time: 46 minutes (Sky Atlantic); 52 minutes (Canal+)
- Production companies: Kudos; Shine France

Original release
- Network: Sky Atlantic
- Release: 16 October 2013 – 14 December 2017
- Network: Canal+
- Release: 11 November 2013 – 18 June 2018

The Tunnel (French: Tunnel) is a British–French crime drama television series adapted from the 2011 Danish–Swedish crime series The Bridge (Bron/Broen). The series began broadcasting on 16 October 2013 on Sky Atlantic in the UK, and on 11 November 2013 on Canal+ in France. The series stars Stephen Dillane and Clémence Poésy as British and French police detectives Karl Roebuck and Elise Wassermann. The plot follows the two detectives working together to find a serial killer who left the upper half of a French politician and the lower half of a British prostitute in the Channel Tunnel at the midpoint between France and the UK. The killer is nicknamed the "Truth Terrorist" and is on a moral crusade to highlight many social problems, terrorising both countries in the process. As the series progresses, the killer's true intention is revealed.

The Anglo–French adaptation of The Bridge was announced as a joint project between Sky and Canal+ in January 2013. Tunnel head writer Ben Richards worked with Hans Rosenfeldt, the creator of the original series. Due to the setting, the dialogue of the series is bilingual, a first for a British / French television co-production. Filming took place between February and August 2013 with a budget of £15 million, and was shot on location in Kent, England and Nord-Pas-de-Calais, France. It was produced with both British and French crew members. The premieres on both Sky Atlantic and Canal+ received strong ratings for the respective channels, with an initial consolidated figure of almost 900,000 in the UK and 1.3 million in France. Critical reception of the series has been generally positive, with Dillane and Poésy's acting being praised, as well as the plot's grittiness. Some reviewers made favourable comparisons with The Bridge, though others criticised The Tunnel for being identical. The producers admit that the first episode is a copy of the original.

On 16 February 2015, Canal+ and Sky Atlantic announced that a second series would begin production in March, set to air in early 2016, entitled The Tunnel: Sabotage, and consisting of eight episodes. Series 2 would focus on the crash of an airliner into the English Channel, with Dillane and Poésy returning; it premiered on Canal+ on 7 March 2016. The debut on Sky Atlantic was originally set for 5 April 2016 but was put off until a week later in deference to the Brussels terrorist attacks on 22 March 2016. It premiered in the UK on 12 April 2016 and was made available via Sky's On Demand service.

The renewal for a third and final series was announced on 20 January 2017 entitled The Tunnel: Vengeance and consisting of six episodes. It began filming in March 2017 and premiered on Sky Atlantic on 14 December 2017, with all episodes released on the same day. Canal+ did not announce a corresponding date for France at the time of the UK release. (Note: Asked in an October 2017 interview when the new season was going to premiere, Clémence Poésy said, "I do not know if season 3 will be broadcast in France". Bellet, Nicolas (2 October 2017). "Tunnel – Clémence Poésy : "Je ne sais pas si la saison 3 sera diffusée en France "". Première (in French).) Season 3 premiered on Canal+ on 4 June 2018.

In the United States, the first season aired on many PBS stations from June through August 2016. The second season was broadcast from June through August 2017. The third season aired July through August 2018.

== Cast and characters ==
=== Main ===
- Stephen Dillane as Det. Chief Inspector Karl Roebuck
- Clémence Poésy as Captain/Commander (Note: Note that in The Tunnel, French police ranks are given their literal translation, and that in France, the rank structure of the police is closer to that of the armed forces than the British police, being divided into the CEA (non-commissioned personnel), the CC (commissioned officers) and the CCD (field- and general- equivalent ranks). Accordingly, a "commander" (commandant) is equivalent to a rank between Chief Inspector and Superintendent within a British-style police force, and a "commissioner" (commissaire) is a superintendent. A "divisional commissioner" (commissaire divisionnaire), the next rank, is therefore best translated in meaning as "Chief Superintendent". Élise Wassermann is therefore in a position equivalent to detective inspector at the start of the series, and receives a promotion to a DCI-equivalent position upon the further promotion of Olivier Pujol. (Note however that within the French policing system, commissaires are usually recruited through a separate pathway). The title of "commissioner" should not be seen as equivalent in any way to a chief police officer or PCC – the equivalent to a chief-officer rank would be an "emploi supérieur de direction" (senior command position), which refers to officers holding ranks at and above controller-general (contrôleur-général) level.) Elise Wassermann
- Angel Coulby as Laura Roebuck (Regular: Series 1–2, Guest: Series 3)
- Thibault de Montalembert as Commander Olivier Pujol
- Cédric Vieira as Lieutenant Phillipe Viot
- Thibaut Evrard as Gaël (Series 1–2)
- Fanny Leurent as Officer Julie
- William Ash as Det. Constable Boleslaw 'BB' Borowski (Series 2–3)
- Juliette Navis as Lieutenant Louise Renard (Series 2–3)
- Laura de Boer as Eryka Klein (Series 2)
- Marie Dompnier as Madeleine Fournier (Series 2)
- Emilia Fox as Vanessa Hamilton (Series 2)
- Johan Heldenbergh as Robert Fournier (Series 2)
- Hannah John-Kamen as Rosa Persaud (Series 2)
- Stanley Townsend as Chief Superintendent Mike Bowden (Series 2)
- Christine Bottomley as Helena Carver (Series 3)
- Eileen Davies as Lilian Wright (Series 3)
- William Gaminara as Wesley Pollinger (Series 3)
- Valentin Merlet as Commander Astor Chaput (Series 3)
- Felicity Montagu as Chief Superintendent Winnie Miles (Series 3)
- Angeliki Papoulia as Lana Khasanović (Series 3)
- Sharon Rooney as Kiki Stokes (Series 3)
- Brian Vernel as Anton Stokes (Series 3)

=== Recurring ===
==== Series 1 ====
- Tobi Bakare as Det. Constable Chuks Akinade
- Jeanne Balibar as Charlotte Joubert
- Tom Bateman as Danny Hillier
- Mia Goth as Sophie Campbell
- Paul Ready as Benji Robertson
- Sigrid Bouaziz as Cécile Cabrillac
- Mathieu Carrière as Alain Joubert
- Catalina Denis as Veronica
- Nigel Lindsay as Jonno
- Jack Lowden as Adam Roebuck
- Joseph Mawle as Stephen Beaumont
- Keeley Hawes as Suze Beaumont
- James Frain as John Sumner
- Anastasia Hille as Det. Superintendent Andrea Kerrigan
- Ed Skrein as Anthony
- Jean-Toussaint Bernard as Mathieu

==== Series 2: Sabotage ====
- Nicolas Wanczycki as Thibaut Briand
- Mish Boyko as Stefan Cyzrko
- Edyta Budnik as Vladka Horvath
- Clarke Peters as Sonny Persaud
- Paul Schneider as Artem Baturin
- Con O'Neill as Neil Grey
- Jan Bijvoet as The Chemist
- Emilia Fox as Vanessa Hamilton

==== Series 3: Vengeance ====
- Angela Wynter as Celeste
- India Ria Amarteifio as Maya Roebuck
- Wim Willaert as Jacques Moreau
- Tony Jayawardena as Lawrence Taylor
- Nicholas Burns as Richard Carver
- Phil Zimmerman as Jimmy Jones
- Liliane Rovère as Edith Dutheil

==== Stephen Dillane and Clémence Poésy ====
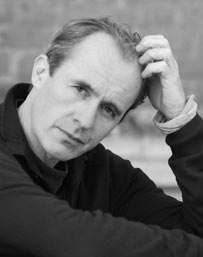
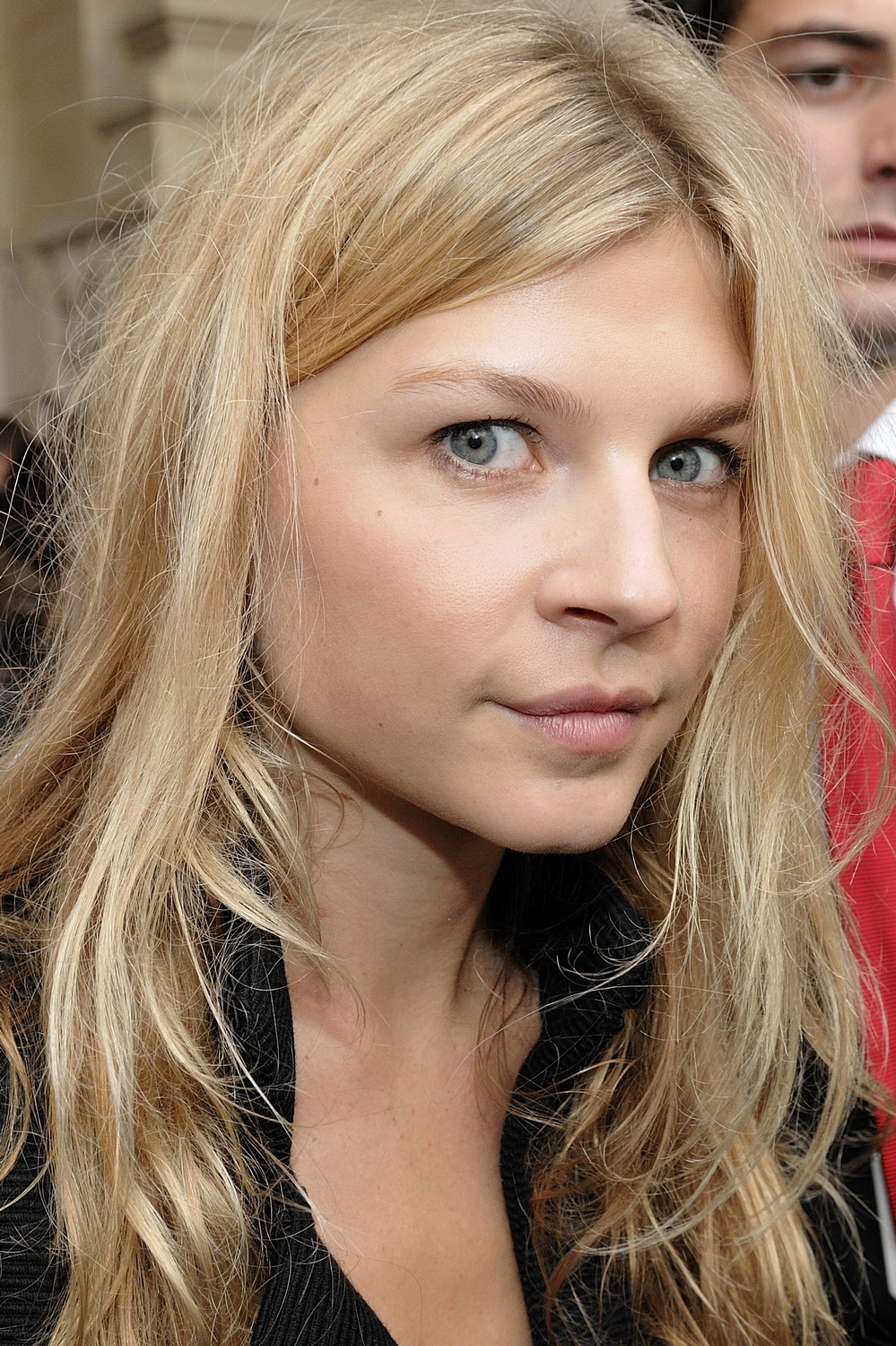
Stephen Dillane (left) and Clémence Poésy (right) star in the series as detectives Karl Roebuck and Elise Wassermann.

Stephen Dillane plays Detective Chief Inspector Karl Roebuck of Northbourne Police (a fictional counterpart to the real life Kent Police), an ageing British detective used to getting his own way. Roebuck's role parallels that of Martin Rohde (played by Kim Bodnia), the Danish detective in The Bridge. Karl and Martin share some characteristics, but also differ in certain ways; for instance, Karl is "more educated and a more troubled man". Dillane was drawn to the political questions raised in the storyline, as well as the series' "novelistic telling".

Clémence Poésy plays Capitaine (later Commander) Elise Wassermann of the DCPJ, the French detective and Roebuck's opposite. Wasserman's role parallels that of Saga Norén (played by Sofia Helin), the Swedish detective in The Bridge. Elise shares some characteristics with Saga, including driving a Porsche (in Elise's case, a Porsche 944), picking up men from bars for casual sex, and exhibiting behaviour consistent with Asperger syndrome. The innate seriousness of the character was a trait that Poésy found "quite annoying", but the actress came to appreciate Elise's honesty. Both Dillane and Poésy opted not to view the original Scandinavian series, with the latter stating that it would allow her more freedom in interpreting the character. Poésy dubbed her English lines for the French broadcast.

==== Guests ====
The series includes several guest stars. Joseph Mawle plays a social worker named Stephen Beaumont, Tom Bateman appears as journalist Danny Hiller, and Tobi Bakare plays Chuks Akinade. Thibault de Montalembert plays Olivier Pujol, who is the head of the Calais police service, and Elise's superior. Sigrid Bouaziz plays Cécile Cabrillac and Cédric Vieira plays Philippe Viot; these characters are police officers who work with Elise. Mathieu Carrière and Jeanne Balibar play banker Alain Joubert, and his wife Charlotte, respectively. Merlin actress Angel Coulby stars as Laura Roebuck, Karl's wife, while Jack Lowden plays Adam, his son. Keeley Hawes guest-starred as Suze Harcourt, a care worker and drug addict, along with Liz Smith, who plays Harriet, an elderly woman under Harcourt's care.

James Frain plays Kieran Ashton ("John Sumner"), a former colleague of Karl, who faked his suicide and became the Truth Terrorist, serving as the primary antagonist of the first season and a behind-the-scenes antagonist in the second season. The character is motivated by the loss of his identity and family, as well as betrayal from Karl by his affair with Kieran's wife before her death. Frain believed that Kieran is the most disturbing character he has played. Portraying the character, the actor wanted to make his actions understandable, though not justifiable.

== Development and production ==
The Anglo–French adaption of the Danish/Swedish series The Bridge was first announced by Sky in January 2013. The ten-part series was to be a co-production between British broadcaster Sky and French broadcaster Canal+. Sky Atlantic director Elaine Pyke commissioned the show with the intention of establishing the channel as a home for British dramas following the channel's release of the drama series Hit & Miss and Falcón. Due to the setting of the series, it would be bilingual, with dialogue being spoken in English and French. This made The Tunnel, according to its producers, the first series in British and French television to be bilingual.

"The Bridge is an incredible nuanced serial killer thriller, but what writer Ben Richards has done is something particular to the whole French–British experience. We're neighbours, we have so much in common and yet we're thousands of miles apart on so many things."

— Jane Featherstone on the British and French dynamic of the series

Being a "50–50 co-production" between the British and French, the crew were a mix from both countries, and neither party has "final control". The series employed both British and French writers and directors to collaborate on the series, with former Spooks writer Ben Richards leading the writing team. Multiple versions of the script were used, which were translated for both languages. Five directors were hired for the series, three of them British and the other two French. Dominik Moll is considered the head director, with the other directors being Hettie MacDonald, Thomas Vincent, Udayan Prasad and Philip Martin. The series' executive producers are Sky's Anne Mensah; Canal+'s Fabrice De La Patellière; Kudos' Jane Featherstone, Karen Wilson, Manda Levin and Ben Richards; Shine France's Nora Melhli; and Filmlance's Lars Blomgren. Ruth Kenley-Letts is the series producer. Jane Featherstone, the chief executive of the production company Kudos, said of the British–French collaboration: "We have had to work very collaboratively to make sure we are appealing to both nations. I honestly don't know if we have got that right yet. The French like things to be slightly slower, we like them pacier."

In developing the storyline of the series Featherstone said that "the team took what was wonderful from [the original] and then forgot about it, in the nicest possible way, and made their own show." While working for the series, Richards worked with Hans Rosenfeldt, the Swedish writer who created The Bridge. Many aspects of the first episode are virtual copies of the first episode of the Scandinavian series, including: the female lead "stripping unselfconsciously to her underwear in the office", the male lead's relationship with his teenage son, and the "sleazy journalist [being] held captive in his own car with a ticking bomb", the last of which was a sequence Richards wanted to repeat in the remake. However, Richards said that as the series progressed and the drama unfolded the storylines would diverge from the original. Featherstone also noted there would be plenty of changes, saying that many had "seen both [The Bridge and The Tunnel], who feel that they get satisfaction because the characters go on different journeys and the actors all bring a whole new level of interest in it".

=== Filming and locations ===
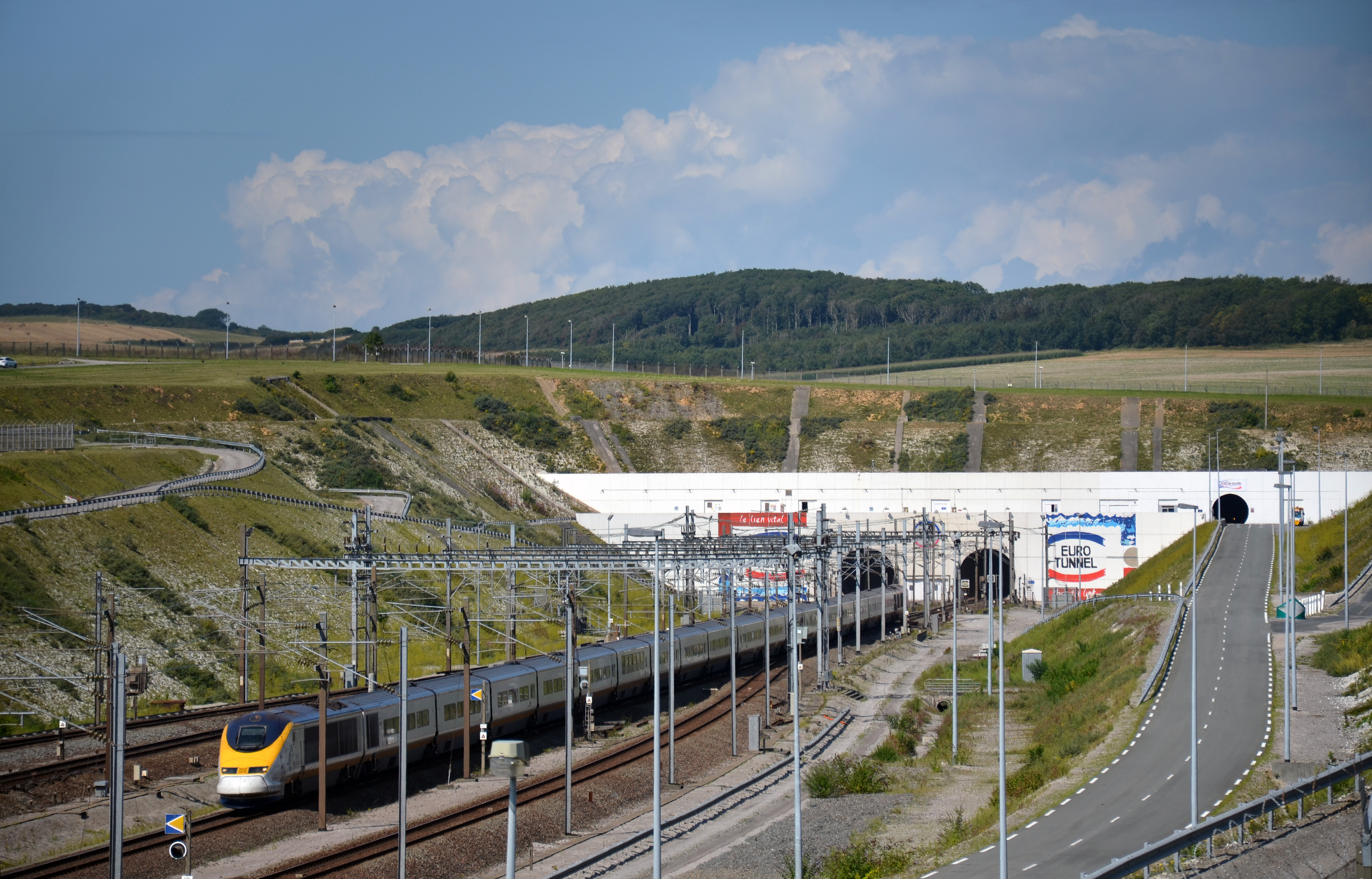
Some scenes were filmed in the Channel Tunnel (pictured, entrance to the tunnel in Coquelles, France)

The budget of the series is estimated to be £15 million. Filming began in February 2013 and concluded in August 2013, with location shooting largely taken place in Kent and northern France. Filming in Kent was based in Discovery Park in Sandwich and was supported by the Kent Film Office. A former Pfizer facility was used as a number of sets, including the Calais police station and Elise's apartment. The series was filmed throughout five districts: Canterbury, Dover, Folkestone and Hythe, Swale and Thanet. Several prominent locales were featured, including Folkestone Harbour; The Turner Contemporary art gallery; Westwood Cross shopping centre; and the towns of Dover, Folkestone and Margate. Production also made use of the Kent Film Office's legal powers to close certain roads for uninterrupted filming. An estimated £2.5 million of the budget was spent on, among other services, accommodation, locations, parking and catering, providing a boost for the Kent economy. The filming in France was supported by the Nord-Pas de Calais Film Commission and benefited from the Tax Rebate International. Shooting took place over 31 days across Boulogne-sur-Mer, Calais, Dunkerque, and Wissant.

Some scenes of The Tunnel were also shot in the Channel Tunnel itself, which makes the series the first television drama production to do so. The producers spent "months of gentle negotiation" with Eurotunnel, the company that operates the tunnel, for permission to shoot scenes there. Eurotunnel allowed it. According to Moll, "The only thing they didn't want was to see train passengers in danger or fires." Moll also noted that they did not shoot in the actual midpoint of the tunnel, stating "once you are a few kilometres in, it all looks the same."

Filming for series two again took place in Kent and France. The production filmed for 85 days in Kent between April and July 2015, with a further 50 days in the county for pre- and post-production, spending an estimated £1.5 million. The Kent filming locations included Eurotunnel, Folkestone Harbour, Discovery Park, Deal (including the pier), Folkestone, Dover (including the port and Dover Castle), Westwood Industrial Estate Margate, Ramsgate, The Barn in Upstreet, St Martin's Hospital, and Knowlton Court.

For series three, filming locations in East Kent included Reculver, Botany Bay, Ramsgate Royal Harbour and Port of Dover.

== Release ==
=== Broadcast ===
The Tunnel had a world premiere on 7 October 2013 in France at the international television trade exhibition MIPCOM in Cannes.

In the United Kingdom, Sky Atlantic premiered the series on 16 October 2013 at 9 pm, and continued weekly until 18 December. The debut was seen by an average of 362,000 overnight viewers, considered strong ratings for the channel. With consolidated ratings taken into account, the first episode went up to 803,000 viewers on Sky Atlantic, with an extra 90,000 viewing from its catch-up channel, Sky Atlantic +1. However, the second episode dropped a third of its overnight audience, leaving it with 236,000 viewers. The finale was seen by 267,000 overnight viewers.

In France, the series premiered on Canal+ on 11 November 2013 at 8:55 pm, with two out of ten episodes airing consecutively, and concluded on 9 December 2013. The premiere attracted 1.3 million viewers, making it one of the highest rated original series debut for the channel. The first series had an average audience of 1.04 million viewers per episode.

Series 2, titled The Tunnel: Sabotage, premiered on Canal+ on 7 March 2016, and concluded on 28 March 2016.

The second series debut on Sky Atlantic was originally set for 5 April 2016 but was put off until a week later in deference to the Brussels terrorist attacks on 22 March 2016. Series 2 premiered in the UK on 12 April 2016 and was made available via Sky's On Demand service. The season finished on 31 May 2016.

Series 3, titled The Tunnel: Vengeance, premiered on Sky Atlantic on 14 December 2017, with all episodes released on the same day. The season premiered on Canal+ on 4 June 2018, and the finale aired on 18 June 2018.

In the United States, The Tunnel was broadcast on many PBS stations. Season 1 aired from 19 June through 21 August 2016, Season 2 from 15 June through 3 August 2017, and Season 3 from 1 July through 5 August 2018.

The Tunnel is distributed by Endemol Shine International in the U.S.

=== Home media ===
A four-disc DVD box set (Region 2) of Series 1 was released in France by StudioCanal on 20 December 2013, with special features including a "making of" feature and interviews featuring Clémence Poésy and Dominik Moll. The DVD and Blu-ray of Series 1 was released in the United Kingdom on 13 January 2014 by Acorn Media UK, and includes three discs, with special features including a making-of feature, cast and crew interviews, and a picture gallery.

The box set of Series 2 was released in France by StudioCanal on 29 March 2016.

Starting on 1 February 2014, the first episodes of The Tunnel – along with some other original Sky Television series – were released for free in the UK on YouTube as an attempt to attract more Sky subscribers.

All 3 seasons are streaming on Voot Select in India.

== Episodes ==
| Series | Episodes | Originally released | | |
| Series | Episodes | First released | Last released | Network |
|---|---|---|---|---|
| 1 | 10 | 16 October 2013 | 18 December 2013 | Sky Atlantic |
| 2 | 8 | 7 March 2016 | 28 March 2016 | Canal+ |
| 3 | 6 | 14 December 2017 | | Sky Atlantic |

== Reception ==
The Tunnel received generally positive reviews from television critics. Alex Fletcher of Digital Spy stated that while remakes are "often underwhelming", The Tunnel was "gripping stuff", and he believed that viewers "should find plenty to enjoy" in the series. The performances of Dillane and Poésy were also lauded. Gerard Gilbert of The Independent was positive in his assessment of the series, stating that "as an avid fan of The Bridge, I am happy to report that The Tunnel works well in its own right – it's intelligently made, well cast and ambitiously cinematic", adding that it had "succeeded in its high-risk strategy of re-working a near-flawless Scandi-drama in our Anglo-French image". Ellen E Jones, also of The Independent, said that Dillane and Poésy's performances "stuck closely" to the original characterisation of the leads from the Scandinavian version. Of the execution, Jones stated: "should you bother watching The Tunnel even if you've already seen the original? The early signs are good. The makers obviously have sense enough to preserve what was effective about the original, and invention enough to distinguish their work too."

"As a global TV franchise, it's pure gold: there's a US-Mexican version already screening and there are frontiers all over the world with tension and history dotted across the boundary. The South Korea-North Korea would be ace."

— Metro reviewer Keith Watson

In a review posted early in the first season, Gerard O'Donovan of The Daily Telegraph expressed mixed feelings about the series "so far at least", saying: "there was no sense that this was doing much different from other mainstream crime thrillers. Sticking too close to the original script meant a golden opportunity was missed to dig deeper into the attitudes and history that both connect and divide the UK and France". However, he also wrote that he would be "happy to be persuaded otherwise if the action develops".

Harry Venning of The Stage believed that, plotwise, the collaboration between the British and French police forces and style were "all very effectively done, creepily atmospheric and splendidly gruesome", but also stated that the best thing about the series was "the interplay between Stephen Dillane's easygoing, laddish, rosbif detective inspector and his po-faced, glacial but – wouldn't you know it – extremely sexy Gallic counterpart, played by Clémence Poésy." Metro reviewer Keith Watson, having rated the series four stars out of five, stated: "the idea is great. But what's surprising about The Tunnel (Sky Atlantic) is that it's less a version of, more a faithful remake."

The Guardian posted a number of reviews on its website. Julia Raeside deemed the series a "perfectly cast remake of Swedish-Danish crime hit", and stated that "this confirms Dillane as one of our very finest. Such control. Poésy is beautifully chilly, and Joseph Mawle (another cracker) leads an asylum-seeker subplot. It's also really funny." Writing about the finale, Reaside said of Dillane's performance: "If this were on a terrestrial channel, he'd be up for all the awards." On the Karl–Elise partnership, she stated: "I wasn't sure about them as a pairing but was immediately convinced by their uncomfortable chemistry." Having not enjoyed The Bridge, Andrew Anthony called The Tunnel an "attractive proposition", adding that "there's an engaging confidence to the slow revelation of the story. All in all, this looks good." Sam Wollaston was more critical of the series, stating that, while the tone was "atmospheric, intriguing, gripping" and there were strong performances from the lead cast members, The Tunnel was "exactly the same as the (recent) original". Wollaston felt that the only "obvious" difference was that, in the original series, there "was a bridge, this is a tunnel. However magnificent an engineering feat the Channel tunnel is, it can't compete as a spectacular location with the Øresund Bridge."

=== Awards and nominations ===
==== Broadcasting Press Guild Awards ====
| Year | Category | Nominee | Result | Ref |
|---|---|---|---|---|
| 2014 | Best Multichannel Programme | The Tunnel, a co-production of Kudos and Shine France Films in association with Filmlance for Sky Atlantic HD & CANAL+ | Won | |

==== Globes de Cristal Award ====
| Year | Category | Nominee | Result | Ref |
|---|---|---|---|---|
| 2014 | Best Television Film / Television Series (French: Meilleur Téléfilm / Série Télévisée) | Tunnel, by Dominik Moll and Ben Richards, Series 1 (Canal+) | Won | |

==== Guild of British Camera Technicians ====
| Year | Category | Nominee | Result | Ref |
|---|---|---|---|---|
| 2016 | BSC/ACO/GBCT Television Drama Operators Award | Joe Russell, The Tunnel: Sabotage – Episodes 2, 3, 5 & 6 | Won | |

==== International Emmy Award ====
| Year | Category | Nominee | Result | Ref |
|---|---|---|---|---|
| 2014 | Best Drama Series | The Tunnel | Nominated | |
| 2014 | Best Performance by an Actor | Stephen Dillane, The Tunnel | Won | |

==== Royal Television Society ====
| Year | Category | Nominee | Result | Ref |
|---|---|---|---|---|
| 2014 | Actor – Male | Stephen Dillane, The Tunnel | Nominated | |
| 2014 | Music – Original Score | Adrian Johnston, The Tunnel | Won | |
| 2014 | Music – Original Title | Adrian Johnston and Dominik Moll, The Tunnel | Won | |
| 2016 | Editing – Drama | Katie Weiland, The Tunnel: Sabotage | Nominated | |
| 2016 | Sound – Drama | Simon Bysshe, Nigel Squibbs, Jamie Caple and Jeremy Price, The Tunnel: Sabotage | Won | |

== See also ==
- The Bridge (Danish/Swedish TV series)
- The Bridge (US TV series)
