= Gunpowder, Treason & Plot =

2004 BBC miniseries

- Written by: Jimmy McGovern
- Directed by: Gillies MacKinnon
- Starring: Clémence Poésy; Kevin McKidd; Robert Carlyle; Tim McInnerny; Emilia Fox; Michael Fassbender
- Music by: John E. Keane
- Country of origin: United Kingdom
- Original language: English

Production
- Cinematography: Nigel Willoughby
- Editor: Pia Di Ciaula
- Running time: 205 min (2 parts)

Original release
- Network: BBC Two
- Release: 14 March – 21 March 2004

Gunpowder, Treason & Plot is a 2004 BBC miniseries based upon the lives of Mary, Queen of Scots and her son James VI of Scotland. Written by Jimmy McGovern, the series tells the story behind the Gunpowder Plot in two parts, each centred on one of the respective monarchs. The first film dramatizes the relationship between Mary (Clémence Poésy) and her third husband, James Hepburn, 4th Earl of Bothwell (Kevin McKidd). Scottish actor Robert Carlyle stars as James VI in the second part, which concentrates on the Gunpowder Plot, planned by Guy Fawkes, to blow up the Houses of Parliament in order to rid the nation of a Protestant monarch.

== Plot ==
Episode 1 opens with Mary, Queen of Scots, who is in exile in France returning to Scotland in 1561. Mary's second husband is Lord Darnley who participates in the extrajudicial killing of David Rizzio. Mary's son, James I, was sired by Darnley. Mary's final husband is long-time paramour Bothwell.

The opening scene of episode 2 is in Scotland in 1587 showing James I saying, "I have every right to hate you [his mother Mary]."

== Cast ==
- Clémence Poésy as Mary, Queen of Scots
  - Iona Ruxandra Bratosin as Young Mary
- Carmen Ungureanu as Mary of Guise
- Steven Duffy as Lord James, half-brother of Mary, Queen of Scots
- Kevin McKidd as Bothwell
- Tadeusz Pasternak as David Rizzio
- Maria Popistașu as Lady Marie
- Catherine McCormack as Queen Elizabeth I
- Gary Lewis as John Knox
- Paul Nicholls as Lord Darnley
- Robert Carlyle as King James VI and I
- Sira Stampe as Anne of Denmark
- Tim McInnerny as Cecil
- Emilia Fox as Lady Margaret
- Michael Fassbender as Guy Fawkes
- Richard Coyle as Robert Catesby
- Richard Harrington as Thomas Percy in episode 2
- Sam Troughton as Thomas Winter in episode 2

== Production ==
Directed by Gillies MacKinnon, it was filmed in Romania with a Scottish crew. McGovern had previously covered the Plot in the one-hour play Traitors for BBC2's Screenplay strand, transmitted on 5 November 1990.

== See also ==
- Gunpowder (TV series) – another BBC production about the Plot, starring Kit Harington.
