= Elise Wassermann =

- The Tunnel character
- Clémence Poésy as Elise Wasserman
- First appearance: Series 1 Episode 1
- Last appearance: Series 3 Episode 6
- Created by: Ben Richards
- Portrayed by: Clémence Poésy

In-universe information
- Title(s): Captain; Commander
- Occupation: Law enforcement
- Affiliation: Direction Centrale de la Police Judiciaire
- Nationality: French

Elise Wassermann is a fictional character, and one of the two main protagonists in the joint British and French television series The Tunnel (2013), a remake of the Swedish/Danish television series The Bridge. Portrayed by actress Clémence Poésy, she is a counterpart for the character Saga Norén (played by Sofia Helin), a police detective partnered with DCI Karl Roebuck (played by Stephen Dillane).

Poésy has stated that she deliberately avoided watching the original Swedish series from which her character originates, to avoid having any outside influences on her portrayal of the character, and that the relationship between Elise and Karl was her favourite part of the series. On her character, she explains that she views her as being "so fragile and pure" and "like a kid".

== Character ==
Elise starts the series as a Capitaine (Captain) in the DCPJ, but later advances to the rank of Commandant (Commander) following the promotion of her superior, Olivier Pujol. As with her Swedish counterpart, Elise is noted for demonstrating traits consistent with Asperger syndrome, such as difficulty in understanding or recognising social concepts such as empathy, sarcasm, and lying; also, she possesses an above-average intellect, a good eye for detail and a reputation for thoroughness. As with Saga, she frequently engages in casual sex, has a difficult history (in Elise's case, she lost her twin sister in a drowning accident when she was a child), and drives a Porsche (in Elise's case, a Porsche 944). However, there are some differences between the two characters' personalities; Elise is less guarded about her emotions and has less difficulty in forming social relationships (including some romantic ones). As she spends more time with her British colleague, Karl Roebuck (Dillane), he coaches her through social scenarios where she normally struggles, and makes more allowances for her when she messes up.

Critics generally praised both Poésy and Dillane's chemistry, with Rebecca Smith of The Daily Telegraph comparing their relationship to that of the protagonists of Broadchurch, and James Stansfield of Den of Geek observing that it created a "powerful" finale.

Until series 2, Elise does not show any interest in being involved in a romantic relationship. Her sexual encounters with men are casual. Although in series 2 she starts off with a boyfriend, Gaël, who has just moved in with her, he subsequently leaves Elise when he realizes that her commitment to her work is more important. Later in the series, and to her own surprise, Elise develops feelings for Eryka Klein, a German woman who worked alongside a French judge killed in the aeroplane crash she was investigating. Eryka was one of the children born into the notorious Colonia Dignidad colony in Chile, where she had lost her twin brother. Elise finds herself sexually attracted to Eryka and their connection becomes romantic, but their relationship proves to have dire consequences on her case. In "Episode 2" of Series 3, Elise tells Maya Roebuck that she lost her virginity to a boy when she was thirteen years old, and to a girl when she was fifteen.

== Storyline ==
=== Series 1 ===
Elise first meets DCI Karl Roebuck when a body is discovered at the mid-point of the service side of the Channel Tunnel, with the French side occupied by a controversial French politician, Marie Villeneuve, and the British side occupied by a Welsh prostitute named Gemma Kirwan, who had disappeared several months previously. Their relationship gets off to a frosty start when Elise ignores all social niceties and rudely tells Karl that the operation falls under French jurisdiction (before they discover the second body). As the investigation begins, Elise's eye for detail quickly helps to identify the slaughterhouse where the victims were dismembered, and clear the fascist farmer who owned it as a suspect, when she realises that he does not understand English. However, her lack of social skills and bluntness quickly get on Karl's nerves, particularly when she makes an insensitive comment to an elderly woman that they are interviewing when the second "truth" occurs. In turn, she comes to find his sarcasm and willingness to bend procedure to be obstructive, when he allows another suspect, Charlotte Joubert, to leave when Elise was about to interview her.

Over the course of the investigation, however, Karl and Elise develop a much closer relationship, both professionally and personally, as her superior intellect and dedication to the job complements his professionalism and powers of persuasion. In addition, Karl begins to care for Elise when she is shot by the Truth Terrorist (TT) - the alias that the killer has given himself - while trying to save Jean-Claude Delplanque, an elderly victim of his "second truth", and later when she offers him support when his marriage begins to take strain as a result of his infidelity. However, it takes a severe knock when Karl discovers that his teenage son, Adam, spent the night at Elise's apartment, and is only barely reassured when she explains that she did not actually engage in physical intimacy with him. She later refuses to spend time with Adam when she realises that it has upset his father, and at one point joins Karl's family for dinner.

In addition, it is shown that, despite her outwardly unemotional demeanour, Elise continues to be haunted by the death of her twin sister, whose photograph she keeps on her desk. This is seen when she rescues fourteen-year old Sophie Campbell, a runaway who had inadvertently run into TT while staying in the home of a mentally ill man who went on to perpetrate TT's "third truth", by tackling her off a pier and into the water beneath. When Karl notices the effect that it has had on her, Elise reveals that her sister had drowned when the two had been dragged out to sea by a riptide when her parents had taken them on a beach holiday, and that they had only managed to rescue her.

When a potential lead points to a former French policeman, Fabien Vincent, as TT, Elise organises an ambush to try and take him into custody, but it proves a failure, much to her anger. The investigation is also hindered by the DCRI whom Vincent has been working for in their investigation into a suspected gun-running enterprise. Subsequently, Elise is kidnapped by Vincent and his colleague, so that he can answer her questions and prove his innocence without being taken into custody. They are ambushed by gangsters seeking to kill Vincent, and he manages to take her to safety. When TT is identified as Karl's former colleague, Kieran Ashton, whose wife he had had an affair with, Elise agrees to look after Adam while Karl goes to rescue his wife, who has been placed in a trap by Ashton.

When she learns of his recent conversations with his former girlfriend in South Africa, as well as the circumstances around the death of Ashton's wife, Elise realises that Adam is the target, just as he has snuck out to meet his girlfriend. She is unable to get to him before he is kidnapped, and bears witness as a distraught Karl becomes aggressive and snaps at everyone. While he searches for his son alone, Elise has an idea; she tracks Fabien Vincent down and gets details on a property that the organisation that he and Ashton had worked for, Peloton, had used as a safe house. A quick search of the house leads to the discovery of Adam's body. Elise goes to the Tunnel, where Karl is confronting Ashton. She attempts to talk Karl down by informing him that they have found Adam and that he is in hospital. When she approaches, however, he sees evidence that she has been crying, and deduces that his son is dead. Elise manages to talk Karl down, and subdues Ashton. With the investigation over, Karl decides to retire from the police force, and he and Elise bid each other farewell.

=== Series 2 ===
Series 2, The Tunnel: Sabotage, begins about a year after the events of series 1. Elise has been promoted to Commander of her unit after Olivier accepts a new assignment in Paris. Her boyfriend, Gaël, is now living with her although she is having difficulty sharing her space with him. While attending a management class (which she takes to improve her leadership skills), she is called to the Folkestone to interview Chloe Fournier, a little girl whose mother, Madeleine and stepfather, Robert, were kidnapped in the Channel Tunnel. She is happy to reunite with Karl, who is in charge of the PPU where Chloe is being kept. Unfortunately, due to her condition, Elise is unable to properly communicate with the traumatised Chloe, and has to rely on the assistance of her colleague. That evening, Elise joins Karl's family for dinner, where she quickly notices that his marriage to Laura is on the rocks.

Unbeknownst to the group, Robert Fournier, an ideological anarchist, had actually staged the kidnapping, and after executing Madeleine, leads his team in a major act of terrorism: with the help of some inside agents and his deceased wife's research, he hacks into the autopilot of a passenger plane and crashes it into the Channel, killing all on board. When Elise goes to investigate the wreckage with Karl and the rest of the police force, she bears witness to his violent and hostile reaction to a paparazzo trying to get close to the wreckage. Shortly afterwards, Olivier, who has arrived to assist with the investigation, covertly informs Elise about the truth behind the crash, warning her not to share it with anyone.

After a member of Fournier's gang is identified and later apprehended, the team piece together the details of the plot, including Fournier's involvement. However, members of the cell storm the police station and try to break Rosa out. This leads to a hostage standoff, during which Rosa demands that Elise and Karl be brought in return for two hostages. Elise goes in alone, and Rosa questions her over the photo of her twin sister on her desk. Elise, in turn, goads Rosa into attacking her, causing Olivier to order his men in and attack. Before her death from sepsis in hospital, Rosa lets slip the name "Koba", who Elise believes may be the cell's leader.

Meanwhile, a link is made between several passengers on the plane and a human trafficking ring based in Folkestone. One is Paul Bresson, a French judge highly involved in human rights and human trafficking, and the other is a Polish detective who had been investigating the ring at the time, Elise is assigned to interview Eryka Klein, a German national who worked as Bresson's assistant. Initially, she angers Eryka with her questioning, but subsequently learns from her reading material and subsequent questioning of Eryka's background. She had been born and raised on the notorious Colonia Dignidad colony in Chile, where she had been subjected to sexual assault, and had lost her twin brother early in her life. This strikes a chord with Elise, who is likewise haunted by the premature death by drowning of her twin sister when they were children. With the approval of Olivier, she begins seeing Eryka as a friend, although this soon causes her to ignore plans with Gaël.

Following the failed siege, the team track Robert down to a nearby dock, but he makes his escape. Elise is prevented from pursuing him when she sees the body of a woman he killed floating in the water, and freezes as the image causes her to have flashbacks to the day her sister died. Following the incident, Karl manages to blackmail his boss into providing him with the information of an MI5 investigation into Vanessa Hamilton, the woman managing the organisation that Bresson was investigating. They discover that the organisation has ties to Gregor Baturin, a Georgian arms dealer, who was imprisoned by Bresson. Gregor also has ties to Colonia Dignidad. They realise that Koba is Gregor's son and lawyer, Artem Baturin, and that he is threatening the British government into releasing his father.

The aircraft crash was a mere demonstration, and Baturin has a nuclear option to ensure he is not arrested - Edgar Branco, a psychopathic doctor from Colonia Dignidad who possesses a variety of dangerous viruses capable of infecting thousands. Suspicion soon falls upon Eryka, who didn't board the plane due to a supposedly lost passport and had a close relationship with Bresson and his timetable. When Karl and Elise interview Eryka, she eventually reveals in anger that Gregor had been one of the men who raped her in her youth. Despite this, Karl expresses doubt about whether Eryka's alibi adds up.

Shortly after this incident, Elise meets Eryka in a bar to finish questioning her. When Eryka arrives, she notices that Elise is wearing makeup, something she has never done before. After discovering that it is Elise's birthday, Eryka insists on buying a bottle of champagne for them to share. Although she dislikes the taste of alcohol, Elise agrees. As they drink, Eryka questions Elise about her sister, and later lets slip that she feels a connection to her, which Elise admits she feels as well. Later, as Eryka walks the slightly drunk Elise home, she blocks her path and stares intently into her eyes, as if she were about to kiss her. Rattled, Elise tells Eryka her boyfriend is waiting for her and quickly makes her exit, leaving Eryka visibly disappointed. The next day, Karl and Elise interview Eryka again. Karl notices the interaction between them is not entirely professional and becomes suspicious when Elise begins to play down the evidence stacking up against Eryka.

Sometime later, Gaël, having grown fed up of Elise, breaks up with her and moves out. Later that same evening, Eryka arrives to say goodbye to Elise before returning to Hamburg to see her grandmother. On impulse, Elise invites her in. While looking at Elise's book collection, she admits that Gael broke up with her because she didn't love him. When Eryka presses further, Elise accidentally lets slip that she loves her instead. She attempts to backtrack by insisting that her feelings for her are purely platonic, but Eryka gently touches her face, silencing her, and asks if she's quite sure of that. In response, Elise kisses her. Eryka returns the kiss and then takes Elise to bed.

The following day, Karl sees that Elise is now defending Eryka more fiercely, particularly when evidence comes in that suggests that Eryka's card was used to buy the tampered phone used to hack into the plane. He eventually asks her point blank if she is having sex with Eryka. Elise erupts in anger at this question, but eventually agrees to look at the evidence. Upon doing so, she sees that Eryka's card was used by the same man who was seen boarding the plane with Bresson, and realises that Eryka was indeed involved in its destruction. Distraught, she calls Olivier to come to her apartment to tell him everything, when Eryka unexpectedly shows up to say hello. Elise confronts her directly. Realising her cover has been blown, Eryka confesses to her involvement, explaining that she sides with Baturin because the United States had been fully aware of the goings on in Colonia Dignidad. Realising she is about to be arrested, Eryka holds the heartbroken Elise at gunpoint and orders her to get out of her way. When Elise refuses, Eryka forces herself to lie to her that she had merely seduced her to keep an ear to the investigation, and that she feels nothing for her. She shoots Olivier in the leg on the way out, forcing him to hospital.

The day after this incident, Karl comes to pick Elise up and finds the place has been completely trashed. Elise lies that she was merely looking for the bug that Eryka claimed to have placed there. That night, concerned for the emotionally vulnerable Elise, he suggests she come stay with him, but she politely declines. Later that same evening, Eryka breaks into Elise's apartment and wakes her. She tells Elise that she has come back to tell her that she had been lying, and that she loves her. When she tries to kiss Elise, she slaps her away, but Eryka is undeterred and asks her for one more night. Initially hesitant, Elise accedes, and the two have sex. The next day, she tells Karl of the incident, and expresses sadness at having allowed her feelings to compromise the investigation. He tells her that her behaviour is perfectly understandable, observing that her condition causes her to experience emotions such as love and heartbreak more intensely.

After Gregor dies unexpectedly of a heart attack, and their attempt to apprehend Artem fails, Karl is contacted by the MI5 officer investigating him, Neil Gray. Neil orders him to find Branco before Baturin can move him. He and Elise eventually find Branco through a Brazilian rentboy he used, but are taken prisoner when Branco's men show up. Branco takes an unusual interest in Elise's eyes, as they remind him of a previous subject. Wanting revenge, Baturin orders his men to kill them, but Branco convinces him to instead use them as subjects to infect the whole city with one of his viruses. Branco informs the two that the pathogen will become airborne once they die, and will most likely cause a massive outbreak. He carefully inject the virus into the terrified Elise's left eye. At that moment, the police storm the building; out of love for Elise, Eryka had covertly phoned her handlers in Russia and persuaded them to broker a new deal with Neil. The unconscious Elise is rushed to hospital, while Karl and Olivier arrest Baturin, and Neil ushers Eryka onto the helicopter, having agreed to allow her to walk free as part of the new deal.

A week later, Elise is out of danger, the virus having been flushed from her system by multiple blood transfusions. Karl comes to visit, and comforts her, informing her that Baturin is facing trial and the truth behind the plane crash will be suppressed. Despite this, Elise is awoken from a dream about Eryka that night. She subconsciously removes the bandage from her eye.

=== Series 3 ===
She blows herself up after being a victim of a terror attack. Her partner had to make a choice to save her or eleven other people in a van. She decided to take her own life to save the others and not to place the burden on her partner.
