= Women's WorldWide Web (W4) =

Organization

- Founded: 2010
- Founder: Lindsey Nefesh-Clarke
- Type: Operating public charity (IRS exemption status): 501(c)(3)
- Location: United States
- Website: w4.org

Women's World Wide Web (W4) is a European crowdfunding platform dedicated to women's empowerment. W4 is a registered 501(c)(3) organization in the United States, and a non-profit association in France (Association "Loi de 1901"), aVOICESiming to empower girls and women to find their own solutions to driving development. By establishing field projects across Africa, Asia, Latin America, the United States, and Europe, W4 works to ensure the protection of girls' and women's human rights and girls' and women's access to the constituents of development: in particular, access to technology, healthcare, schooling, earning opportunities, the exercise of their rights, and political participation.

== History ==
British-born social entrepreneur, Lindsey Nefesh-Clarke, is the Founder and Managing Director of W4.

After her B.A. at Cambridge University, Nefesh-Clarke joined Human Rights Watch in New York. She worked for several years in Cameroon and Ivory Coast for UNICEF and later for 6 years with the Paris-based humanitarian organization, Children of Asia, which operates educational sponsorship programs in Southeast Asia. In 2008, Nefesh-Clarke trained with Grameen Bank in Bangladesh, founded by Nobel Peace Prize Winner Muhammad Yunus, obtaining a qualification to implement microcredit programs for the alleviation of poverty.

Nefesh-Clarke developed the business plan for W4 in the framework of a year-long ‘International Consulting Project' during her Executive MBA studies at ESCP-Europe business school in Paris. Named "MBA Student of the Year" by the Association of MBAs and The Independent newspaper in 2009, Nefesh-Clarke officially launched W4 on International Women's Day 2010 (March 8, 2010) with her ESCP-Europe colleagues and an international team of volunteers.

The W4 crowdfunding platform has been online since January 2012.

== Mission ==
W4's mission is to enable social investors to contribute—either financially, through crowdfunding; or in-kind, through mentoring and the sharing of skills—to innovative, grassroots girls' and women's empowerment projects around the world, in developing and developed countries. These field projects cover such fields as education, training, healthcare, financial services (microfinance and crowdfunding), access to information and communication technologies (ICTs), culture and the arts, and the environment. W4's blog VOICES aims to raise awareness of the economic and development opportunities that girls and women's empowerment strives for.

== E-mentoring program ==
W4 enables platform users to give financially to grassroots projects and to offer non-financial support by contributing their skills and expertise.

W4 explains on its website: "The e-Mentoring program has been developed in response to several important global trends:

The immense opportunities to leverage ICTs: connecting e-Mentors and e-Mentees; enabling the contribution of skills/expertise and the completion of work across geographical boundaries;

The need of our grassroots field projects for support, skills, and know-how to assist in the start-up/scaling-up or running of their operations;

The desire of "social investors" (members of the general public or company employees) to make rewarding contributions by sharing their skills, in addition to having a financial impact. This trend (as seen in the domain of corporate social responsibility) is uncovering immense human and economic potential. Our e-Mentoring program aims precisely to leverage such potential to the most fruitful ends."

== Corporate partners ==
W4 has worked hand-in-hand with several companies and institutions, including the clothing brand Comptoir des Cotonniers and the RAJA-Danièle Marcovici Foundation

W4's most recent sponsor (since January 2014) is Parisian clothing brand Pablo which teamed up, in Fall 2014, with W4 Ambassadress, French actress, and model Clémence Poésy to design a printed t-shirt that reads, "The Mighties – Live ‘n Loud at W4", illustrating both women's resourcefulness and strength, as well as the importance of amplifying women's voices and voicing support for girls' and women's empowerment around the world. Pablo donated 100% of the sales of the t-shirt to W4's field projects.

== W4 Ambassadors ==
One of W4's first Ambassadresses is Wasfia Nazreen, an experienced mountaineer known for becoming the youngest Bangladeshi woman to reach the summit of Mount Everest. She is also the first Bangladeshi woman to successfully climb Aconcagua, the highest mountain in the western and southern hemispheres; the first Bangladeshi woman to climb Mount Elbrus, the highest peak in Europe; and the first Bangladeshi woman to reach the peak of Mount Vinson, the highest mountain in Antarctica.

French actress and model, Clémence Poésy, became a W4 Ambassadress in 2014. She explains why she came to support W4: "I think women have to care about other women and fight for the ones who can't. I think it is one of the most important fights to lead right now. I work with a web platform called Women's World Wide Web, W4, and they do the funding for lots of different charities around the world. I also think women are the solution."
