= Lullaby for Pi =

- Official release poster
- Directed by: Benoît Philippon
- Written by: Benoît Philippon
- Produced by: Kevin DeWalt; Jean-Charles Levy; Christine Vachon
- Starring: Rupert Friend; Clémence Poésy; Forest Whitaker
- Cinematography: Michel Amathieu
- Edited by: Frédéric Thoraval
- Music by: George Acogny; Laurent Eyquem
- Production companies: Forecast Pictures; Minds Eye Entertainment
- Distributed by: Rézo Films
- Release date: October 11, 2010 (Busan)
- Running time: 98 minutes
- Countries: Canada; France
- Language: English

Lullaby for Pi is a 2010 Canadian drama film written and directed by Benoit Philippon in his feature directorial debut. The film stars Rupert Friend, Clémence Poésy, and Forest Whitaker.

== Plot ==
An unusual courtship begins when a musician, who is still grieving the death of his lover, meets a quirky artist. The musician, Sam, grieves after the death of his wife in the hotel room where he first met her. Due to a mishandling of the hotel keys by the concierge, a distressed girl runs in and closes herself in the bathroom. The girl, Pi and Sam begin communicating through the door. She suggests that they meet in this hotel room again and again, communicating through the bathroom door, till they are ready to love each other.

== Cast ==
- Rupert Friend as Sam
- Clémence Poésy as Pi
- Matt Ward as William
- Forest Whitaker as George
- Sarah Wayne Callies as Josephine
- Colin Lawrence as Jack
- Dewshane Williams as Mo
- Charlie Winston as himself
