= The Ones Below =

2015 film

- Theatrical release poster
- Directed by: David Farr
- Written by: David Farr
- Produced by: Nikki Parrott
- Starring: Clémence Poésy; David Morrissey; Stephen Campbell Moore; Laura Birn; Deborah Findlay
- Cinematography: Ed Rutherford
- Edited by: Chris Wyatt
- Music by: Adem Ilhan
- Release dates: 13 September 2015 (TIFF); 11 March 2016 (United Kingdom)
- Running time: 87 minutes
- Country: United Kingdom
- Language: English
- Budget: £2.3 million (approximately US$3.7 million)
- Box office: $42,951

The Ones Below is a 2015 British thriller directed by David Farr in his feature debut. It was shown in the Panorama section at the 66th Berlin International Film Festival and released on 11 March 2016 in the United Kingdom.

== Plot ==
Kate and Justin are expecting their first baby, and have new downstairs neighbours, Jon and Theresa, who are also expecting their first baby. They invite Jon and Theresa for dinner, during which it's revealed that Kate and Justin hadn't wanted children and were together 10 years before deciding to have a baby, and conceived quickly thereafter. Jon and Theresa tried for seven years to have a child. Theresa, who has been surreptitiously drinking wine despite claiming not to drink alcohol, feels unwell and gets up to leave. She trips down the stairs and loses the baby, whom she was going to name Peter.

Kate and Justin attempt to console the couple but Theresa blames them for the accident and screams that Kate does not deserve "that thing" inside her. Some days later, Kate and Justin receive a note from Jon and Theresa saying they have left and will return only when they can truly be happy for Kate and Justin's baby.

Kate gives birth and they name the baby Billy. Her mother visits, but Kate is offended by her lack of interest in her grandchild. Jon and Theresa return apparently in good spirits. Theresa offers to babysit so Kate can have time to herself. When Kate visits her brother's grave, Theresa leaves the house with Billy. Periodically, Theresa and Jon are out and about with Billy.

Jon and Theresa invite Kate and Justin to supper. Kate brings the baby monitor, over which she hears an adult breathing. She rushes upstairs to find the bath overflowing. Kate grows increasingly suspicious about the other couple's behaviour. She leaves Billy with Theresa then sneaks back upstairs to observe her secretly. She sees Theresa take pictures of Billy and put him to her breast. Kate breaks into Theresa's flat and finds a camera containing photos of Billy, and photos of Jon and Theresa out in public with him. She also discovers a furnished nursery with a framed photo of Jon and Theresa holding Billy. When Kate later brings Justin downstairs to see, the camera is empty and the picture in the nursery has been changed.

Justin works from home until they can move to a new flat. He is called to the office for an emergency, and as he leaves he hands Kate the milk. He finds there is no emergency at the office, but receives an email from Kate saying she's "so sorry." He rushes home to find Kate drowned in the bath, apparently having killed herself after tossing the baby into the canal. Justin moves out, as do Jon and Theresa.

In flashback Theresa and Jon drug Kate via the milk; Jon sends Kate's "sorry" email from her laptop; and Theresa, dressed in Kate's clothes, throws a bundle resembling a swaddled baby into the canal. It is intimated that the bundle was Kate and Justin's cat.

Jon and Theresa settle into their new home in Germany, with their baby, "Peter."

== Cast ==
- Clémence Poésy as Kate
- David Morrissey as Jon
- Stephen Campbell Moore as Justin
- Laura Birn as Theresa
- Deborah Findlay as Tessa
- Jonathan Harden as Mark

== Production ==
The film was partially shot at the Port of Dover ferry terminal in Kent.

== Reception ==
=== Critical response ===
On review aggregator Rotten Tomatoes, the film has an approval rating of 76% based on 49 reviews, with an average rating of 6.2/10. The website's critics' consensus reads: "Creepy and well-crafted overall, The Ones Below marks an auspicious feature-length debut for writer-director David Farr." On Metacritic, the film holds a score of 63 out of 100, based on 13 critics, indicating "generally favorable reviews".

Christy Lemire, writing for RogerEbert.com, gave the film a score of 3 stars out of 4, writing: "David Farr takes the giddy, heady days of early motherhood—the frustration and isolation, the exhaustion and confusion—and mines them for creepy, paranoid thrills in "The Ones Below."" She concluded: "Comparisons to Roman Polanski—particularly to "Rosemary’s Baby"—might seem obvious given the subject matter and setting. But Farr’s film stands on its own: lean, brisk and stylistically precise, and mercilessly free of gratuitous jump scares and gore." Joe Morgenstern of The Wall Street Journal noted the film's lack of originality, but wrote: "Still, there’s plenty to enjoy in the film, starting with a pair of affecting performances by Clémence Poésy and Laura Birn, and ending with a perverse twist on the notion of blissful parenthood." Peter Bradshaw of The Guardian gave the film a score of 4 stars out of 5. He described the film as "an intimately disturbing nightmare of the upper middle classes, with tinges of melodrama and staginess, entirely appropriate for its air of suppressed psychosis." He noted some issues with the film's plot, as well as some similarities with the drama Gas Light and the films Fatal Attraction and The Hand That Rocks the Cradle, but concluded: "It is a thoroughly gripping, horribly absorbing movie."
