= Clémence Poésy =

French actress (born 1982)

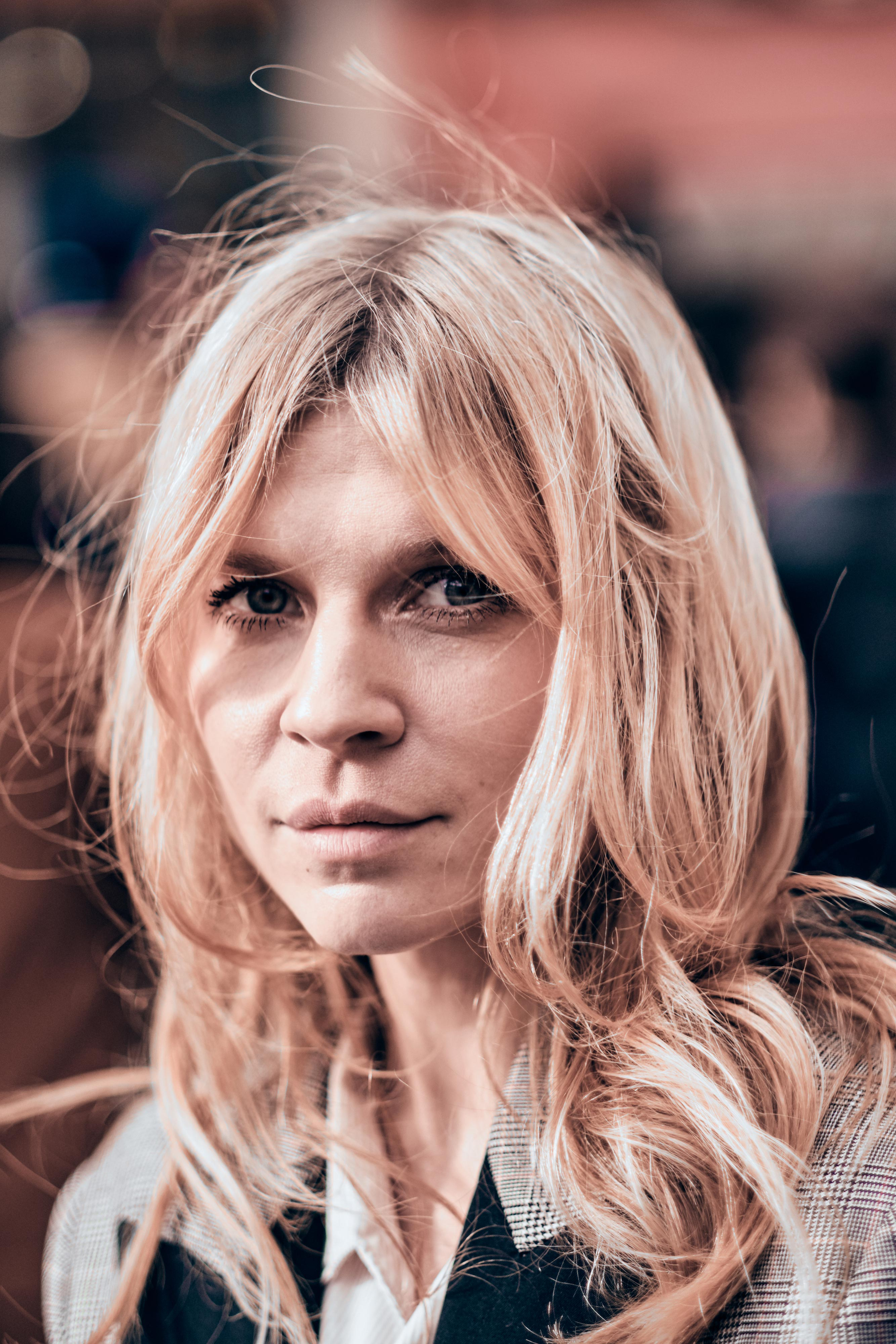
- Poésy in 2019
- Born: Clémence Guichard; 30 October 1982 (age 44); L'Haÿ-les-Roses, France
- Occupations: Actress, Fashion model
- Years active: 1993–present
- Children: 3

Clémence Guichard (born 30 October 1982), known professionally as Clémence Poésy (French: [klemɑ̃s pɔezi]), is a French actress and fashion model. After starting on the stage as a child, Poésy studied drama and has been active in both film and television since 1999, including some English-language productions. She is known for the roles of Fleur Delacour in the Harry Potter film series, Chloë in In Bruges, Rana in 127 Hours, Natasha Rostova in War and Peace, and the lead role as Elise Wassermann in the 24-episode series The Tunnel.

== Early life and education ==
Poésy was born Clémence Guichard on 30 October 1982 in L'Haÿ-les-Roses, a southern suburb of Paris, the eldest daughter of theatre director, actor and playwright Étienne Guichard and French teacher Danièle Poésy. She has a younger sister, Maëlle Poésy, who is also an actress. Both Clémence and Maëlle later adopted their mother's maiden name as their stage name. She grew up in La Butte Rouge, a garden city and social housing complex located in Châtenay-Malabry, a commune southwest of Paris, and was educated at a bilingual alternative school, La Source, in Meudon.

Between 1978 and 1985, Poésy's father performed in an alternative theatre troupe called the Théâtre du Campagnol. Founded by Jean-Claude Penchenat in 1975, the troupe took over an abandoned 1930s swimming pool in Châtenay-Malabry and converted it into a theatre, known as The Piscine. Guichard appeared as a dancer in Ettore Scola's 1983 film Le Bal, and later founded his own experimental theatre company called the Théâtre du Sable in 1990. Clémence's parents also fed their children a white lie that the family's television set was permanently broken to discourage them from watching it; instead, they passed on their enthusiasm for film, literature and theatre, often taking Poésy and her sister, Maëlle, on trips to the theatre and cinema during their childhood. Poésy also recalled that her mother would read stories to her and her sister long after they had learned to read by themselves. The family eventually bought a VCR, but continued to pretend their television did not transmit live broadcast signals, an illusion that was eventually broken when Poésy walked in on her father watching a tennis match.

During her time at La Source, Poésy visited Canada at the age of 13, as part of a month-long school exchange. After leaving La Source at the age of 16, she won a scholarship to attend the École Alsacienne in central Paris. She studied drama at the Conservatoire National Supérieur d'Art Dramatique (CNSAD, the French National Academy of Dramatic Arts), the Atelier International de Blanche Salant et Paul Weaver, and Paris Nanterre University.

== Acting career ==
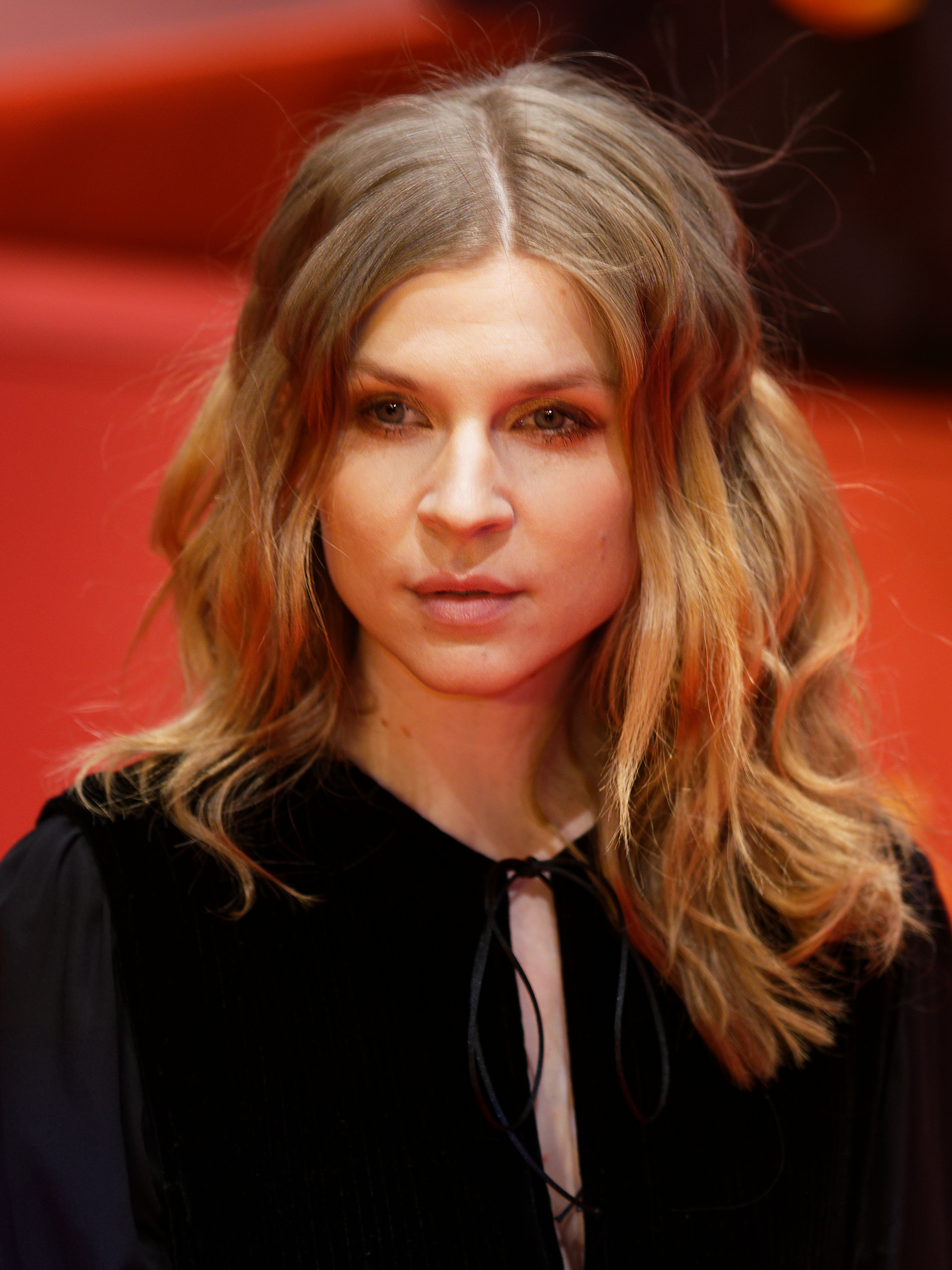
Poésy in 2017

Poésy's first English-speaking role was in the 2004 BBC miniseries Gunpowder, Treason & Plot, in which she played Mary, Queen of Scots, subsequently winning the 2005 Golden FIPA for actress in a TV Series and Serial. In 2005, Poésy appeared in the Harry Potter franchise as Fleur Delacour in the fourth film in the series, The Goblet of Fire, a role she reprised in the final two Harry Potter films, released in 2010 and 2011, respectively. Between 2006 and 2007, she appeared in a number of film and television productions, including the 2007 miniseries adaptation of War and Peace.

In 2008, Poésy starred in the Academy Award-nominated black comedy crime thriller In Bruges, alongside Colin Farrell, and Harry Potter co-stars Ralph Fiennes and Brendan Gleeson. The following year, she starred in the 2009 psychological horror film Heartless opposite Jim Sturgess. She also played Chuck Bass's new French girlfriend, Eva, in the fourth season of The CW's hit show Gossip Girl.

In 2010, Poésy appeared alongside James Franco in 127 Hours, directed by Danny Boyle. The film was screened at the Toronto International Film Festival on 12 September 2010, following its premiere at the 2010 Telluride Film Festival. She also starred alongside Rupert Friend in the 2011 film Lullaby for Pi, a romantic drama and Benoit Philippon's directorial debut. The film is about a jazz singer (Friend) whose wife has just died and who meets a mysterious woman (Poésy). Forest Whitaker also starred. Also in 2011, she starred as Jeanne d'Arc in the French historical film The Silence of Joan, directed by Philippe Ramos. The film was screened in the Directors' Fortnight at the 2011 Cannes Film Festival.

Poésy can also be heard singing on the album Colour of the Trap by Miles Kane. She is featured on the track "Happenstance".

In 2012, Poésy starred as Isabelle Azaire in the BBC's adaptation of Sebastian Faulks's novel Birdsong, alongside Eddie Redmayne, played Queen Isabella in Richard II – the first episode of the BBC TV series The Hollow Crown – and made her Broadway debut in Cyrano de Bergerac as Roxane. She also starred in the short film Hope, directed by Dominique Blanc; the short was part of an eight-film anthology series titled Hopper Stories, commissioned by Arte France and inspired by the artwork of American painter and printmaker Edward Hopper. Hope was inspired by Hopper's 1961 painting A Woman in the Sun. The same year, Poésy appeared in another short film, The Capsule, filmed on the Greek island of Hydra and directed by Athina Rachel Tsangari. In 2013, she starred alongside Michael Caine in the film Mr. Morgan's Last Love, and played Elise Wassermann, the female lead in the Sky Atlantic/Canal+ crime drama series The Tunnel, which comprised 24 episodes over three seasons. Also in 2013, she appeared on stage at the Théâtre La Pépinière in Paris in the play Je Danse Toujours, directed by her father, Étienne Guichard.

In 2015, she appeared in the thriller The Ones Below, directed by David Farr in his feature debut. The film follows follows expectant couple Kate (Poésy) and Justin (Stephen Campbell Moore) as their lives unravel after mysterious new neighbours move into the downstairs flat. The film was screened at the 2015 Toronto International Film Festival, and in the Panorama section at the 66th Berlin International Film Festival, before its release in the United Kingdom on 11 March 2016. In 2017, she played Caroline, the muse and mistress of Alberto Giacometti, in Stanley Tucci's biographical film Final Portrait, alongside Geoffrey Rush and Armie Hammer, and the following year, played Françoise Gilot in the second season of the biographical anthology drama series Genius, focusing on two periods in the life of Pablo Picasso. In 2019, she portrayed Yelena in Chekhov's Uncle Vanya at the Theatre Royal in Bath, and appeared in Christopher Nolan's 2020 science fiction action film Tenet, alongside her Mr. Morgan's Last Love co-star Michael Caine, and Harry Potter co-star Robert Pattinson.

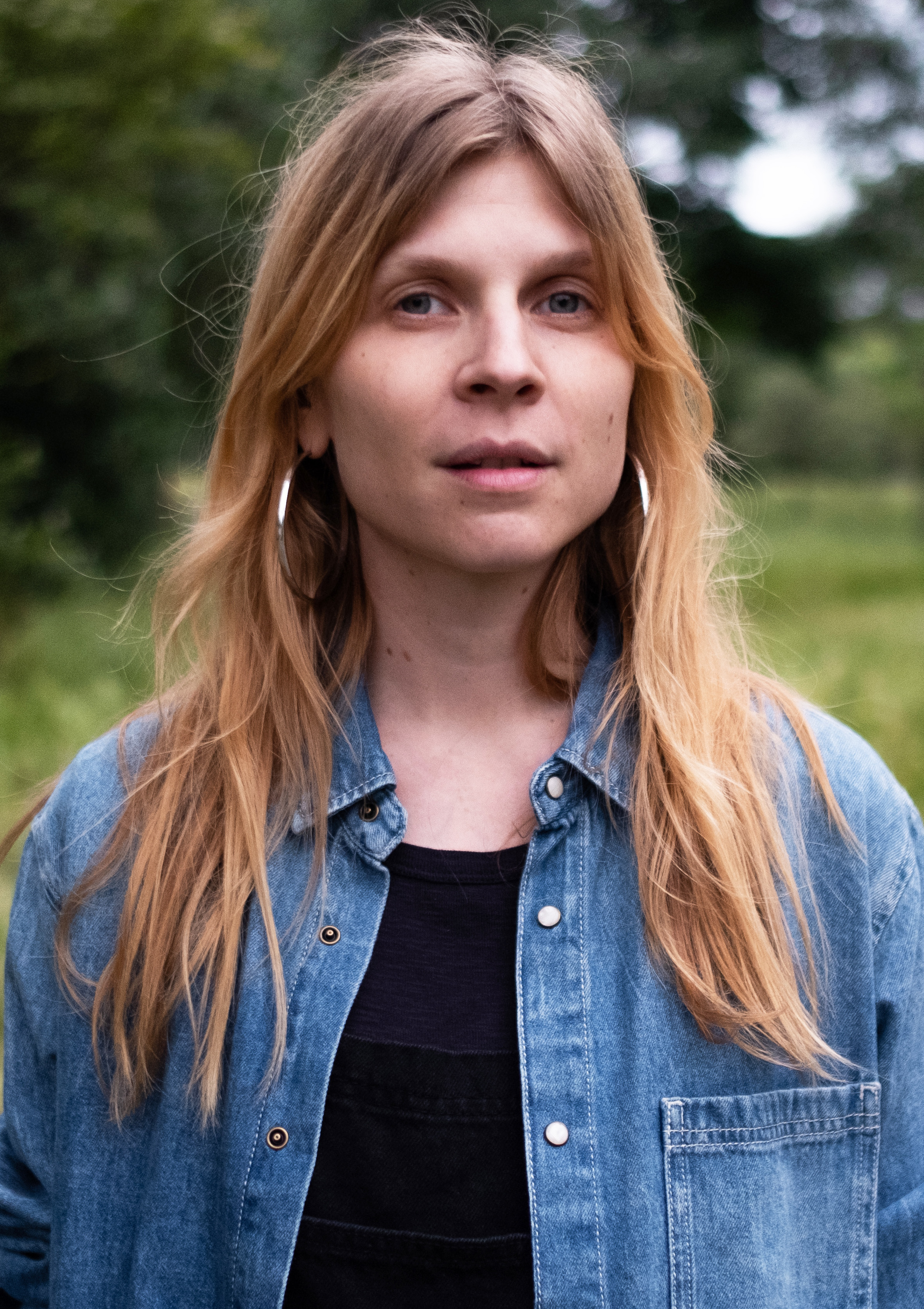
Poésy in 2019

Poésy also starred as the lead actress in the music video for M. Ward's 2020 single "Unreal City," which was filmed in Paris and directed by Beatrice Pegard. The video features Poésy walking and dancing through the streets of the city, bringing the song's themes to life. The same year, she played Emma, a dedicated French Resistance fighter, in the biographical drama film Resistance, alongside Jesse Eisenberg. Poésy shared that she has a direct link to the era in which the film takes place, because her grandmother fought with the French Resistance during World War II.

In 2022, Poésy played Stella Ransome in the Apple TV+ miniseries The Essex Serpent, and the following year, appeared in the drama film The Last Rifleman, alongside Pierce Brosnan and Jürgen Prochnow. Around this time, she also played Isabelle Carriere, a pragmatic nun, in AMC's post-apocalyptic horror drama series The Walking Dead: Daryl Dixon, and scientist Cécile Dumont in the French/Belgian true crime miniseries Sambre - Anatomy of a Crime. In 2024, she portrayed Matilda of Flanders in the period drama King & Conqueror, which premiered on 24 August 2025 on BBC One.

== Modelling career ==
Poésy has modelled for numerous magazine photoshoots, including the covers of i-D, on French magazine Jalouse twice, on Australia's Yen, and on Nylon. Since October 2007, Poésy has been one of three spokesmodels for the self-titled fragrance by Chloé, and has modelled for Gap's Autumn/Winter 2008 campaign. She has cited Patti Smith, Jane Birkin, Marianne Faithfull, Joan Baez, Lee Miller, Francesca Woodman, Niki de Saint Phalle, Mick Jagger and Jim Morrison as influences on her fashion style, and Catherine Keener, Zadie Smith and Joan Didion, as well as Miller, as her beauty icons.

In December 2011, Poésy was chosen as the face of the designer clothing company G-Star Raw. In 2014, she became the poster girl for Chloé's 'Love Story' fragrance, and in 2019, became the face and brand ambassador for the Ultimune and Benefiance skincare lines by Japanese cosmetics brand Shiseido. Poésy has also enjoyed a multi-decade relationship with Chanel as an official brand ambassador, front-row fixture, and creative collaborator. She has been a permanent fixture at Chanel's Paris Fashion Week shows for many years, spanning from the early Karl Lagerfeld eras to the house's latest collections.

== Personal life ==
Poésy is fluent in French and English, and speaks some Italian and Spanish. She divides her time between homes in Paris and east London, and has spent some time in Eastern Europe. Politically, she identifies as "very clearly on the left." Poésy considers herself a lifelong feminist, and has served as an official ambassador for the Women's WorldWide Web (W4) since 2014, advocating for girls' and women's rights, education, and economic independence.

In early 2017, she gave birth to her first child, Liam. In 2019, while filming Tenet, she was pregnant with her second child. At the 2021 Deauville American Film Festival, she was pregnant with her third child.

== Filmography ==
=== Film ===
| Year | Title | Role | Notes |
|---|---|---|---|
| 2001 | Petite Soeur | Anna | Short film |
| 2002 | Olga's Summer | Olga | |
| 2003 | Welcome to the Roses | Magali Rozes | |
| 2005 | Harry Potter and the Goblet of Fire | Fleur Delacour | |
| 2006 | Le Grand Meaulnes | Yvonne de Galais | |
| 2007 | Sans moi | Lise | |
| 2007 | Le dernier gang | Julie | |
| 2008 | In Bruges | Chloë Villette | |
| 2008 | La troisième partie du monde | Emma | |
| 2008 | Blanche | Chloé | Short film |
| 2009 | Heartless | Tia | |
| 2010 | 127 Hours | Rana | |
| 2010 | Pièce montée | Bérengère | |
| 2010 | Lullaby for Pi | Pi | |
| 2010 | Harry Potter and the Deathly Hallows – Part 1 | Fleur Delacour | |
| 2011 | Harry Potter and the Deathly Hallows – Part 2 | Fleur Delacour | |
| 2011 | The Silence of Joan | Jeanne d'Arc | |
| 2012 | The Capsule | Woman #2 | Short film |
| 2012 | Hopper Stories: Hope | | Short film |
| 2013 | Mr. Morgan's Last Love | Pauline Laubie | |
| 2013 | Karaoke! | | Short film |
| 2014 | GHB: To Be or Not to Be | The girl from New York | |
| 2014 | Métamorphoses | The Virgin / The Unicorn | Short film |
| 2015 | The Great Game | Laura Haydon | |
| 2015 | The Ones Below | Kate | |
| 2016 | 7 Minutes | Hira | |
| 2016 | Two Is a Family | Kristin Stuart | |
| 2017 | Final Portrait | Caroline | |
| 2017 | Tito e gli alieni | Stella | |
| 2017 | Grizzly Bear: Mourning Sound | Not Bride | Short film |
| 2019 | Le milieu de l'horizon | Cécile | |
| 2020 | Resistance | Emma | |
| 2020 | Tenet | Barbara | |
| 2023 | The Last Rifleman | Juliette | |

=== Television ===
| Year | Title | Role | Notes |
|---|---|---|---|
| 1999 | Un homme en colère | Hélène | 2 episodes |
| 2000 | Les Monos | Julia | 1 episode |
| 2001 | Tania Boréalis ou L'étoile d'un été | Maguy | TV movie |
| 2003 | Life After All | Jessica | TV movie |
| 2004 | Gunpowder, Treason & Plot | Mary, Queen of Scots | TV movie Golden FIPA Award for Actress in a TV Series and Serial |
| 2005 | Revelations | Exquisite Corpse | Miniseries |
| 2006 | Les Amants du Flore | Lumi | TV movie |
| 2007 | War and Peace | Natasha Rostova | Miniseries |
| 2010 | Gossip Girl | Eva Coupeau | 4 episodes |
| 2012 | Birdsong | Isabelle Azaire | Miniseries |
| 2012 | Richard II | Queen Isabella/Anne | Filmed production of the Shakespeare play as part of The Hollow Crown series on BBC2 |
| 2013–2018 | The Tunnel | Elise Wassermann | Main cast Nominated - L'Association des Critiques de Séries - Best Actress |
| 2018 | Genius: Picasso | Françoise Gilot | Main cast (Season 2) |
| 2021 | In Therapy | Léonora | Recurring role |
| 2022 | Ten Percent | (self) | 1 episode |
| 2022 | The Essex Serpent | Stella Ransome | Miniseries (6 episodes) |
| 2023–2024 | The Walking Dead: Daryl Dixon | Isabelle Carriere | Main cast (11 episodes) |
| 2023 | Sambre - Anatomy of a Crime | Cécile Dumont | 1 episode |
| 2025 | King & Conqueror | Matilda | Main cast (8 episodes) |
| 2027 | Neuromancer | Marie-France Tessier | Main cast |

== Theatre ==
| Year | Title | Notes |
|---|---|---|
| 1993 | Le dragon | |
| 1995 | Mai 45 Mai 95 | |
| 1997 | Picasso 970 | |
| 2003 | Tartuffe | |
| 2012 | Cyrano de Bergerac | Limited Broadway engagement of 31 previews and 52 performances; concluded 25 November 2012 |
| 2013 | Je Danse Toujours | |
| 2019 | Uncle Vanya | Theatre Royal, Bath |

== Decorations ==
- Chevalier of the Order of Arts and Letters (2015)

== Awards and nominations ==
| Year | Awards | Category | Work | Result | ref |
| 2005 | Biarritz International Festival | Golden FIPA: TV Series and Serials: Actress | Gunpowder, Treason & Plot | Won | |
| 2007 | Cabourg Film Festival | Swann d'Or Award for Female Revelation | Le Grand Meaulnes | Won | |
| 2011 | ACS Awards | Best Actress | The Tunnel | Nominated | |
