= Appy, Ariège =

Commune in Occitanie, France

Appy
- Commune
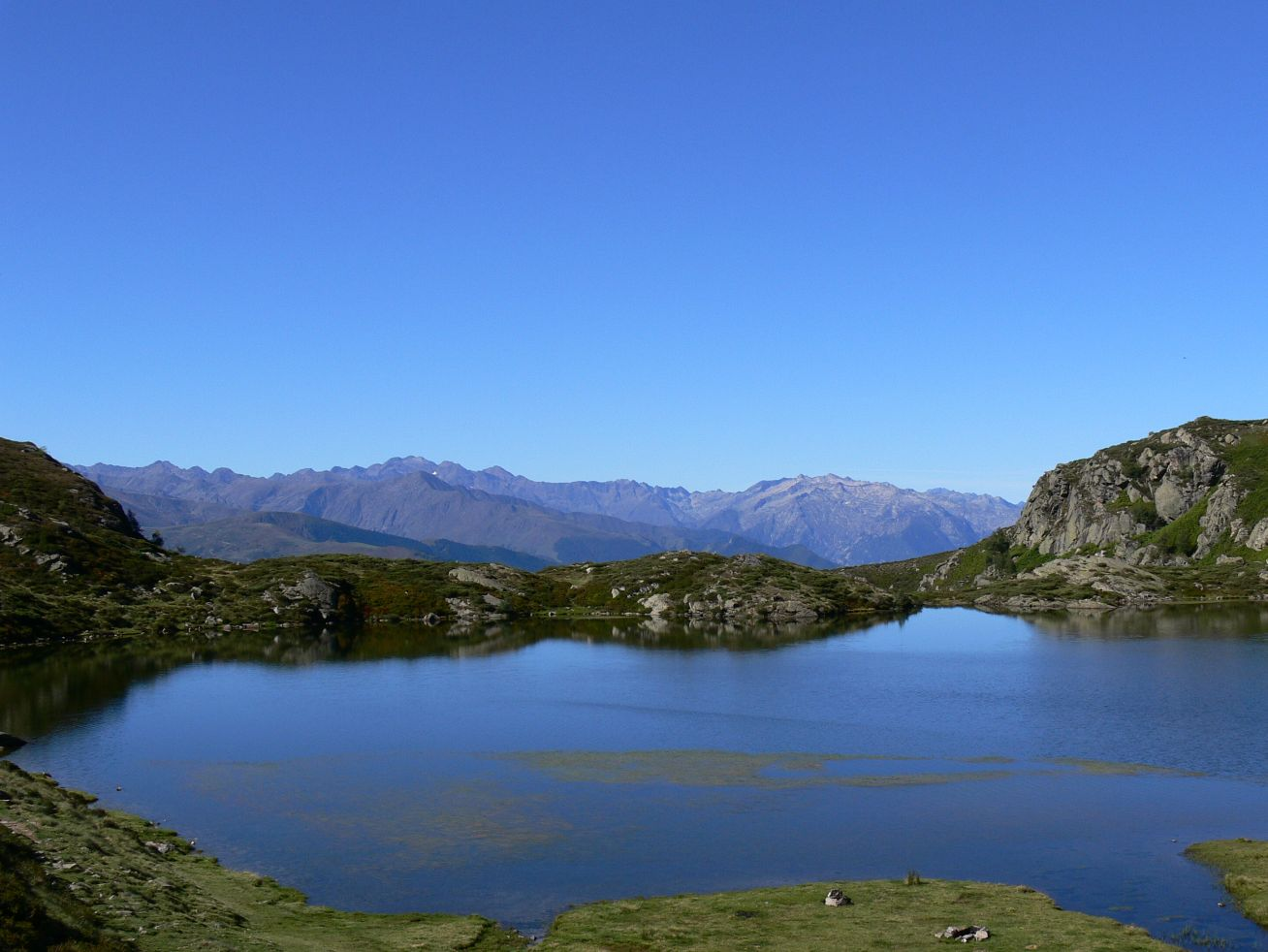
- The "Etang d'Appy" in Summer
- Location of Appy
- Location within France Location within Occitanie
- Coordinates: 42°47′29″N 1°44′02″E
- Country: France
- Region: Occitania
- Department: Ariège
- Arrondissement: Foix
- Canton: Haute-Ariège
- Intercommunality: Haute-Ariège

Government
  - Mayor (2021–2026): David Huez
- Area^{1}: 6.1 km^{2} (2.4 sq mi)
- Elevation: 930 m (3,050 ft)
- Highest elevation: 2,168 m (7,113 ft)
- Lowest elevation: 744 m (2,441 ft)
- Population (2023): 28
  - Density: 4.6/km^{2} (12/sq mi)
- Time zone: UTC+01:00 (CET)
  - Summer (DST): UTC+02:00 (CEST)
- INSEE/Postal code: 09012 /09250
- ^{1} French Land Register data, which excludes lakes, ponds, glaciers > 1 km^{2} (0.386 sq mi or 247 acres) and river estuaries.

Appy (French pronunciation: [api]; Occitan: Api) is a commune in the Ariège department in the Occitanie region of southwestern France.

== Geography ==
Appy is located some 15 km south-east of Tarascon-sur-Ariège and 12 km north-west of Ax-les-Thermes. Access is by the D20 road from Axiat in the east passing through the village and continuing to Caychax in the west. Appy is a remote mountainous commune, heavily forested in the south and west, with the rest alpine terrain.

In the north of the commune is the Etang d'Appy from which flows the Ruisseau de Lac d'Appy towards the south-west to join the Ruisseau de Caychax which joins the Ariège at Albiès. The eastern boundary of the commune is formed by the Ruisseau de Girabel which flows south joining with other streams to join the Ariege at Urs. The Ruisseau de Camelong rises north of the village and flows south-east to join the Ruisseau de la Cassagne.

== Administration ==
List of Successive Mayors

From	To	Name	Party
2001	2026	Yves Huez	DVG

== Demography ==
The inhabitants of the commune are known as Pynarols or Pynaroles in French. The village became almost uninhabited, so much so that there was a period of 64 years without a marriage: there was a marriage in 1946 then one in 2010 which was the subject of an article in La Dépêche du Midi.

Historical population
Year	Pop.	±% p.a.
1968	27	—
1975	20	−4.20%
1982	14	−4.97%
1990	7	−8.30%
1999	9	+2.83%
2007	23	+12.44%
2012	31	+6.15%
2017	25	−4.21%
2023	28	+1.91%
Source: INSEE

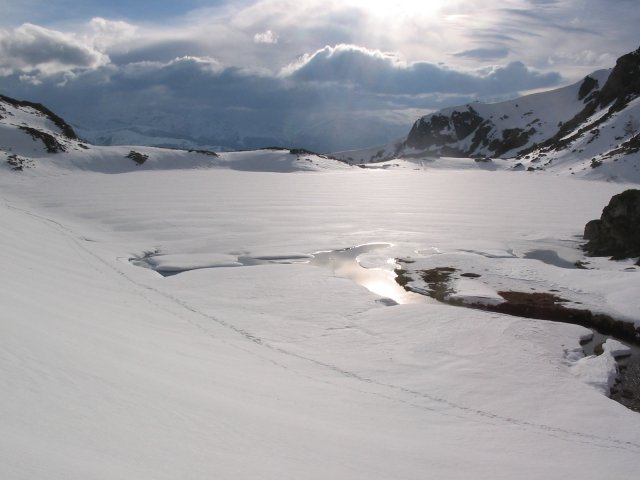
The "Etang d'Appy" in winter

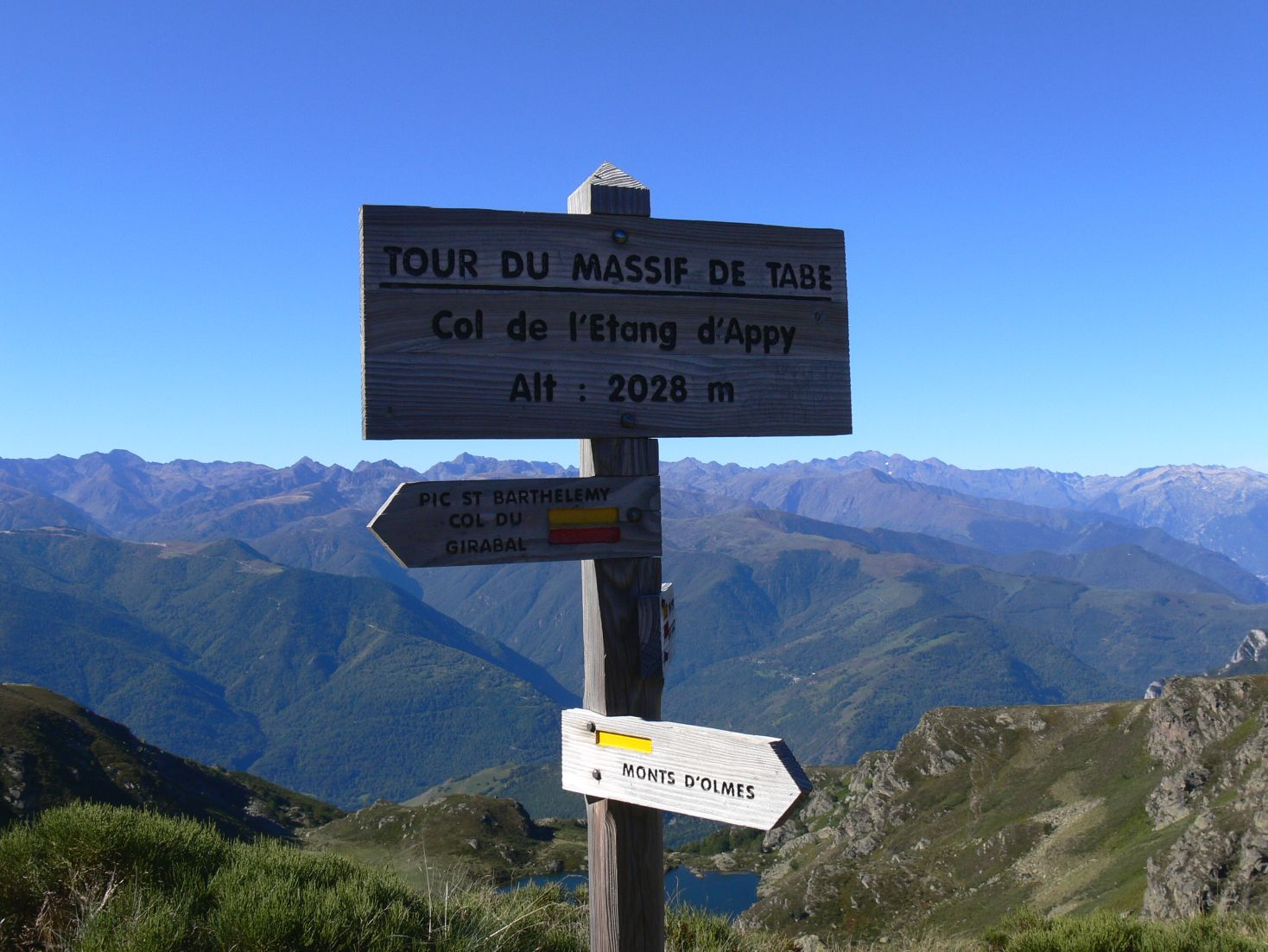
The "Col de l'Etang d'Appy

== See also ==
- Communes of the Ariège department
