= Vaychis =

Commune in Occitanie, France

- Commune
- Location of Vaychis
- Location within France Location within Occitanie
- Coordinates: 42°44′33″N 1°48′20″E
- Country: France
- Region: Occitania
- Department: Ariège
- Arrondissement: Foix
- Canton: Haute-Ariège

Government
  - Mayor (2020–2026): Sylvie Dain
- Area^{1}: 4.49 km^{2} (1.73 sq mi)
- Elevation: 860 m (2,820 ft)
- Highest elevation: 1,505 m (4,938 ft)
- Lowest elevation: 746 m (2,448 ft)
- Population (2023): 36
  - Density: 8.0/km^{2} (21/sq mi)
- Time zone: UTC+01:00 (CET)
  - Summer (DST): UTC+02:00 (CEST)
- INSEE/Postal code: 09325 /09110
- ^{1} French Land Register data, which excludes lakes, ponds, glaciers > 1 km^{2} (0.386 sq mi or 247 acres) and river estuaries.

Vaychis is a commune in the Ariège department in southwestern France.

== Population ==
Inhabitants of Vaychis are called Vaychissois in French.

Historical population
Year	Pop.	±% p.a.
1968	59	—
1975	44	−4.10%
1982	37	−2.44%
1990	26	−4.31%
1999	33	+2.68%
2007	30	−1.18%
2012	29	−0.68%
2017	22	−5.38%
2023	36	+8.55%
Source: INSEE

== See also ==
- Communes of the Ariège department
