= Savignac-les-Ormeaux =

Commune in Occitanie, France

- Commune
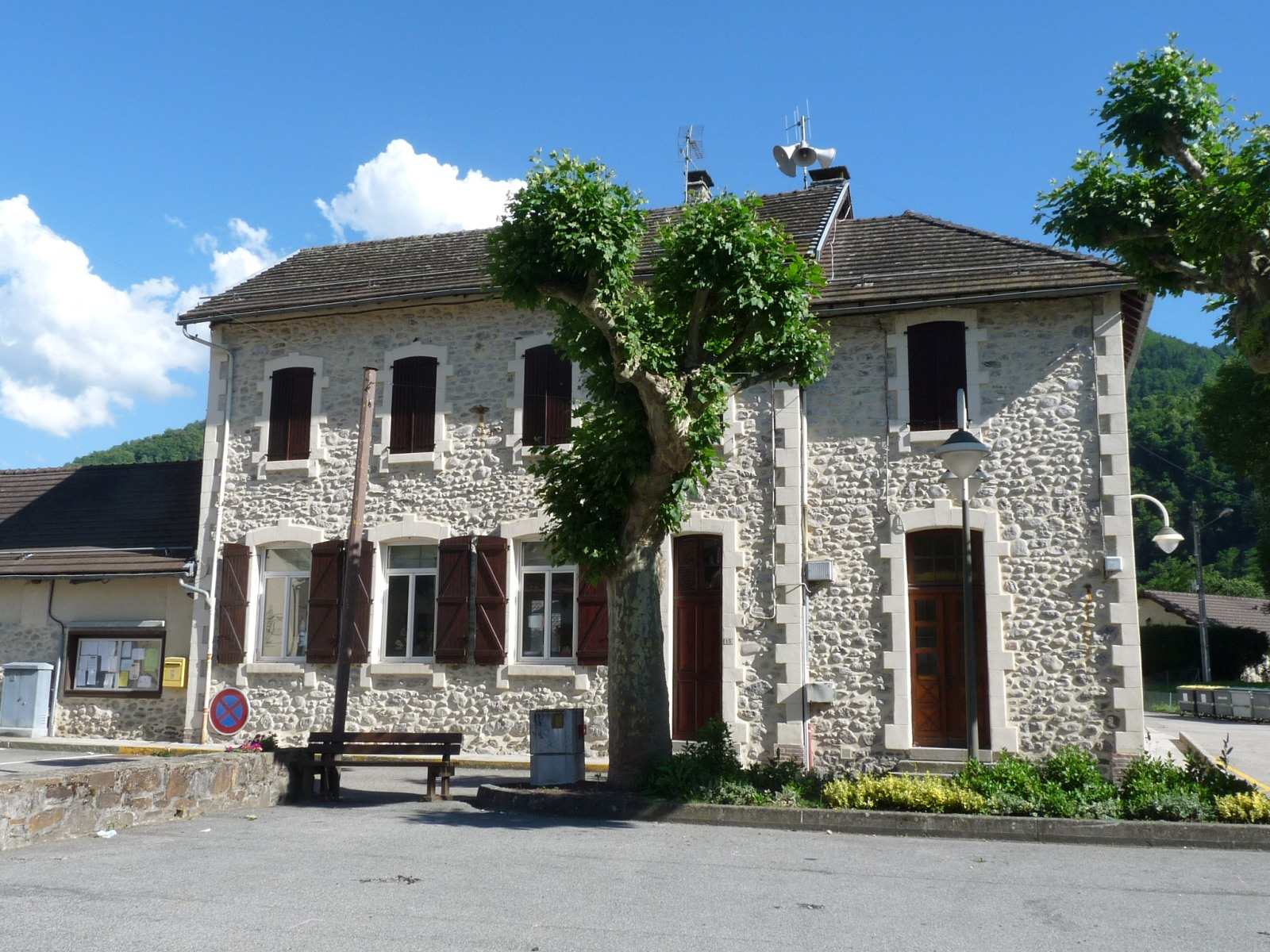
- Town hall
- Location of Savignac-les-Ormeaux
- Location within France Location within Occitanie
- Coordinates: 42°43′50″N 1°49′06″E
- Country: France
- Region: Occitania
- Department: Ariège
- Arrondissement: Foix
- Canton: Haute-Ariège

Government
  - Mayor (2020–2026): Nicolas Pech
- Area^{1}: 28.31 km^{2} (10.93 sq mi)
- Elevation: 680 m (2,230 ft)
- Highest elevation: 2,789 m (9,150 ft)
- Lowest elevation: 665 m (2,182 ft)
- Population (2023): 397
  - Density: 14.0/km^{2} (36.3/sq mi)
- Time zone: UTC+01:00 (CET)
  - Summer (DST): UTC+02:00 (CEST)
- INSEE/Postal code: 09283 /09110
- ^{1} French Land Register data, which excludes lakes, ponds, glaciers > 1 km^{2} (0.386 sq mi or 247 acres) and river estuaries.

Savignac-les-Ormeaux (French pronunciation: [saviɲak le.z‿ɔʁmo]; Occitan: Savinhac) is a commune in the Ariège department in southwestern France.

== Population ==
Inhabitants of Savignac-les-Ormeaux are called Savignacois in French.

Historical population
Year	Pop.	±% p.a.
1968	255	—
1975	292	+1.95%
1982	276	−0.80%
1990	372	+3.80%
1999	399	+0.78%
2007	380	−0.61%
2012	432	+2.60%
2017	371	−3.00%
2023	397	+1.14%
Source: INSEE

== See also ==
- Communes of the Ariège department
