= Le Puch =

Commune in Occitanie, France

- Commune
- Location of Le Puch
- Location within France Location within Occitanie
- Coordinates: 42°43′10″N 2°06′04″E
- Country: France
- Region: Occitania
- Department: Ariège
- Arrondissement: Foix
- Canton: Haute-Ariège

Government
  - Mayor (2020–2026): Michel Uteza
- Area^{1}: 2.89 km^{2} (1.12 sq mi)
- Elevation: 1,100 m (3,600 ft)
- Highest elevation: 1,248 m (4,094 ft)
- Lowest elevation: 851 m (2,792 ft)
- Population (2023): 27
  - Density: 9.3/km^{2} (24/sq mi)
- Time zone: UTC+01:00 (CET)
  - Summer (DST): UTC+02:00 (CEST)
- INSEE/Postal code: 09237 /09460
- ^{1} French Land Register data, which excludes lakes, ponds, glaciers > 1 km^{2} (0.386 sq mi or 247 acres) and river estuaries.

Le Puch is a commune in the Ariège department in southwestern France.

== Population ==
Inhabitants are called Puchéens in French.

Historical population
Year	Pop.	±% p.a.
1968	37	—
1975	31	−2.50%
1982	23	−4.17%
1990	23	+0.00%
1999	20	−1.54%
2007	26	+3.33%
2012	41	+9.54%
2017	29	−6.69%
2023	27	−1.18%
Source: INSEE

== See also ==
- Communes of the Ariège department
