= Arrondissement of Foix =

Coordinates: 42.97°N 1.60°E

Foix
- Arrondissement
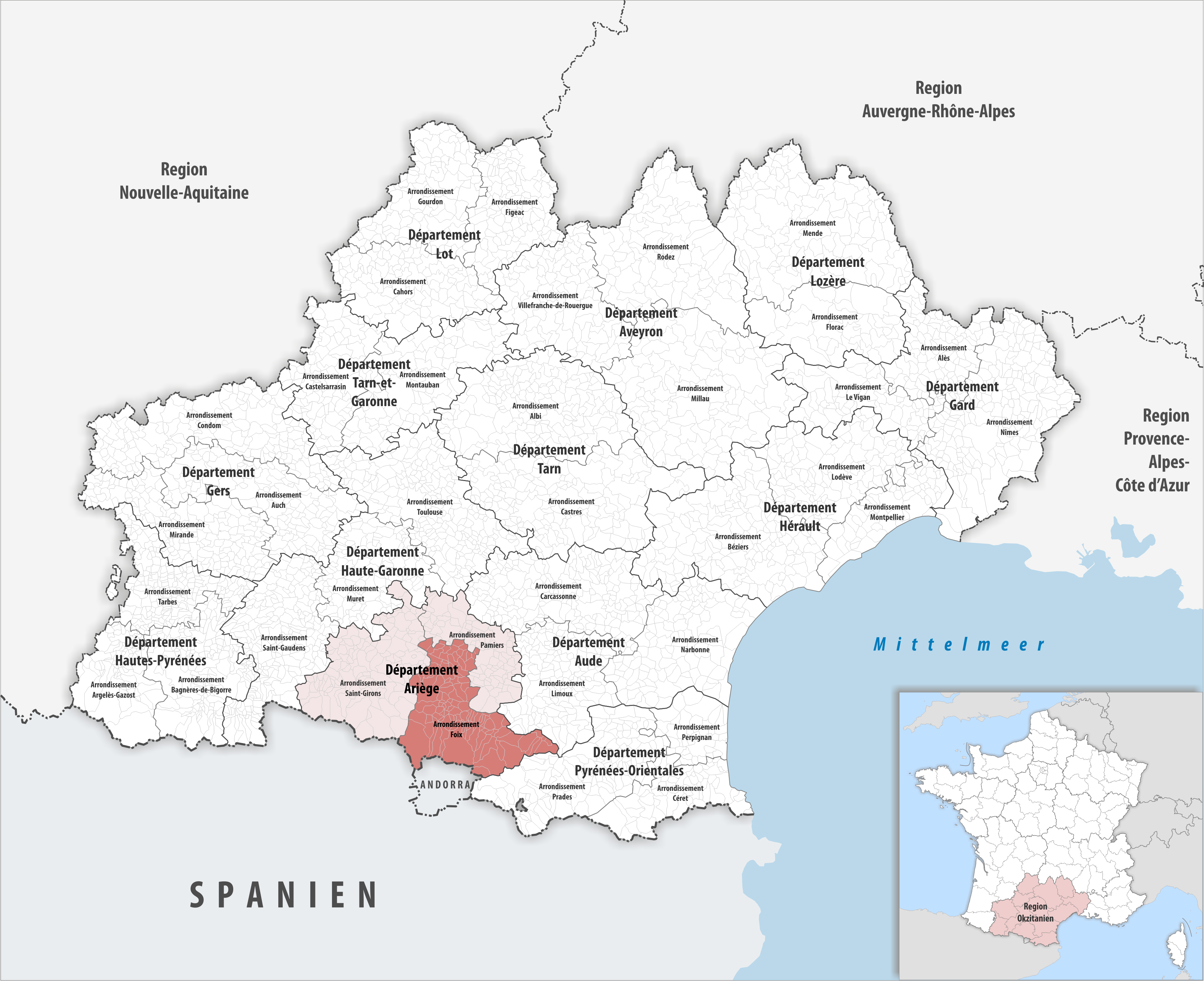
- Location within the region Occitanie
- Country: France
- Region: Occitania
- Department: Ariège
- No. of communes: {{{nbcomm}}}
- Area: 1,793.8 km^{2} (692.6 sq mi)
- Population (2023): 48,575
  - Density: 27.079/km^{2} (70.135/sq mi)
- INSEE code: 091

The arrondissement of Foix is an arrondissement of France in the Ariège department in the Occitania region. It has 113 communes. Its population is 47,794 (2021), and its area is 1,793.8 km^{2} (692.6 sq mi).

== Composition ==
The communes of the arrondissement of Foix, and their INSEE codes, are:

1. Albiès (09004)
2. Alliat (09006)
3. Appy (09012)
4. Arabaux (09013)
5. Arignac (09015)
6. Arnave (09016)
7. Artigues (09020)
8. Artix (09021)
9. Ascou (09023)
10. Aston (09024)
11. Aulos-Sinsat (09296)
12. Auzat (09030)
13. Axiat (09031)
14. Ax-les-Thermes (09032)
15. Baulou (09044)
16. Bédeilhac-et-Aynat (09045)
17. Bénac (09049)
18. Bestiac (09053)
19. Bompas (09058)
20. Le Bosc (09063)
21. Bouan (09064)
22. Brassac (09066)
23. Burret (09068)
24. Les Cabannes (09070)
25. Calzan (09072)
26. Capoulet-et-Junac (09077)
27. Carcanières (09078)
28. Caussou (09087)
29. Caychax-et-Senconac (09088)
30. Cazaux (09090)
31. Cazenave-Serres-et-Allens (09092)
32. Celles (09093)
33. Château-Verdun (09096)
34. Cos (09099)
35. Coussa (09101)
36. Crampagna (09103)
37. Dalou (09104)
38. Ferrières-sur-Ariège (09121)
39. Foix (09122)
40. Ganac (09130)
41. Garanou (09131)
42. Génat (09133)
43. Gestiès (09134)
44. Gourbit (09136)
45. Gudas (09137)
46. L'Herm (09138)
47. L'Hospitalet-près-l'Andorre (09139)
48. Ignaux (09140)
49. Illier-et-Laramade (09143)
50. Lapège (09152)
51. Larcat (09155)
52. Larnat (09156)
53. Lassur (09159)
54. Lercoul (09162)
55. Lordat (09171)
56. Loubens (09173)
57. Loubières (09174)
58. Luzenac (09176)
59. Malléon (09179)
60. Mercus-Garrabet (09188)
61. Mérens-les-Vals (09189)
62. Miglos (09192)
63. Mijanès (09193)
64. Montaillou (09197)
65. Montégut-Plantaurel (09202)
66. Montgailhard (09207)
67. Montoulieu (09210)
68. Niaux (09217)
69. Orgeix (09218)
70. Orlu (09220)
71. Ornolac-Ussat-les-Bains (09221)
72. Orus (09222)
73. Pech (09226)
74. Perles-et-Castelet (09228)
75. Le Pla (09230)
76. Prades (09232)
77. Pradières (09234)
78. Prayols (09236)
79. Le Puch (09237)
80. Quérigut (09239)
81. Quié (09240)
82. Rabat-les-Trois-Seigneurs (09241)
83. Rieux-de-Pelleport (09245)
84. Rouze (09252)
85. Saint-Bauzeil (09256)
86. Saint-Félix-de-Rieutord (09258)
87. Saint-Jean-de-Verges (09264)
88. Saint-Martin-de-Caralp (09269)
89. Saint-Paul-de-Jarrat (09272)
90. Saint-Pierre-de-Rivière (09273)
91. Saurat (09280)
92. Savignac-les-Ormeaux (09283)
93. Ségura (09284)
94. Serres-sur-Arget (09293)
95. Siguer (09295)
96. Sorgeat (09298)
97. Soula (09300)
98. Surba (09303)
99. Tarascon-sur-Ariège (09306)
100. Tignac (09311)
101. Unac (09318)
102. Urs (09320)
103. Ussat (09321)
104. Val-de-Sos (09334)
105. Varilhes (09324)
106. Vaychis (09325)
107. Vèbre (09326)
108. Ventenac (09327)
109. Verdun (09328)
110. Vernajoul (09329)
111. Vernaux (09330)
112. Verniolle (09332)
113. Vira (09340)

== History ==
The arrondissement of Foix was created in 1800. At the January 2017 reorganization of the arrondissements of Ariège, it lost 21 communes to the arrondissement of Pamiers and 13 communes to the arrondissement of Saint-Girons, and it gained 18 communes from the arrondissement of Pamiers.

As a result of the reorganisation of the cantons of France which came into effect in 2015, the borders of the cantons are no longer related to the borders of the arrondissements. The cantons of the arrondissement of Foix were, as of January 2015:

1. Ax-les-Thermes
2. La Bastide-de-Sérou
3. Les Cabannes
4. Foix-Rural
5. Foix-Ville
6. Lavelanet
7. Quérigut
8. Tarascon-sur-Ariège
9. Vicdessos
