= Bestiac =

Commune in Occitanie, France

- Commune
- Location of Bestiac
- Location within France Location within Occitanie
- Coordinates: 42°46′07″N 1°47′17″E
- Country: France
- Region: Occitania
- Department: Ariège
- Arrondissement: Foix
- Canton: Haute-Ariège

Government
  - Mayor (2020–2026): Gérard Tauriac
- Area^{1}: 6.57 km^{2} (2.54 sq mi)
- Elevation: 830 m (2,720 ft)
- Highest elevation: 1,866 m (6,122 ft)
- Lowest elevation: 709 m (2,326 ft)
- Population (2023): 35
  - Density: 5.3/km^{2} (14/sq mi)
- Time zone: UTC+01:00 (CET)
  - Summer (DST): UTC+02:00 (CEST)
- INSEE/Postal code: 09053 /09250
- ^{1} French Land Register data, which excludes lakes, ponds, glaciers > 1 km^{2} (0.386 sq mi or 247 acres) and river estuaries.

Bestiac (French pronunciation: [bɛstjak]; Occitan: Vestiac) is a commune in the Ariège department of southwestern France.

== Population ==
Historical population
Year	Pop.	±% p.a.
1968	23	—
1975	13	−7.83%
1982	14	+1.06%
1990	19	+3.89%
1999	12	−4.98%
2007	16	+3.66%
2012	20	+4.56%
2017	19	−1.02%
2023	35	+10.72%
Source: INSEE

Inhabitants of Bestiac are called Bestiacois in French.

== See also ==
- Communes of the Ariège department
