= Aston, Ariège =

Commune in Occitanie, France

Aston
- Commune
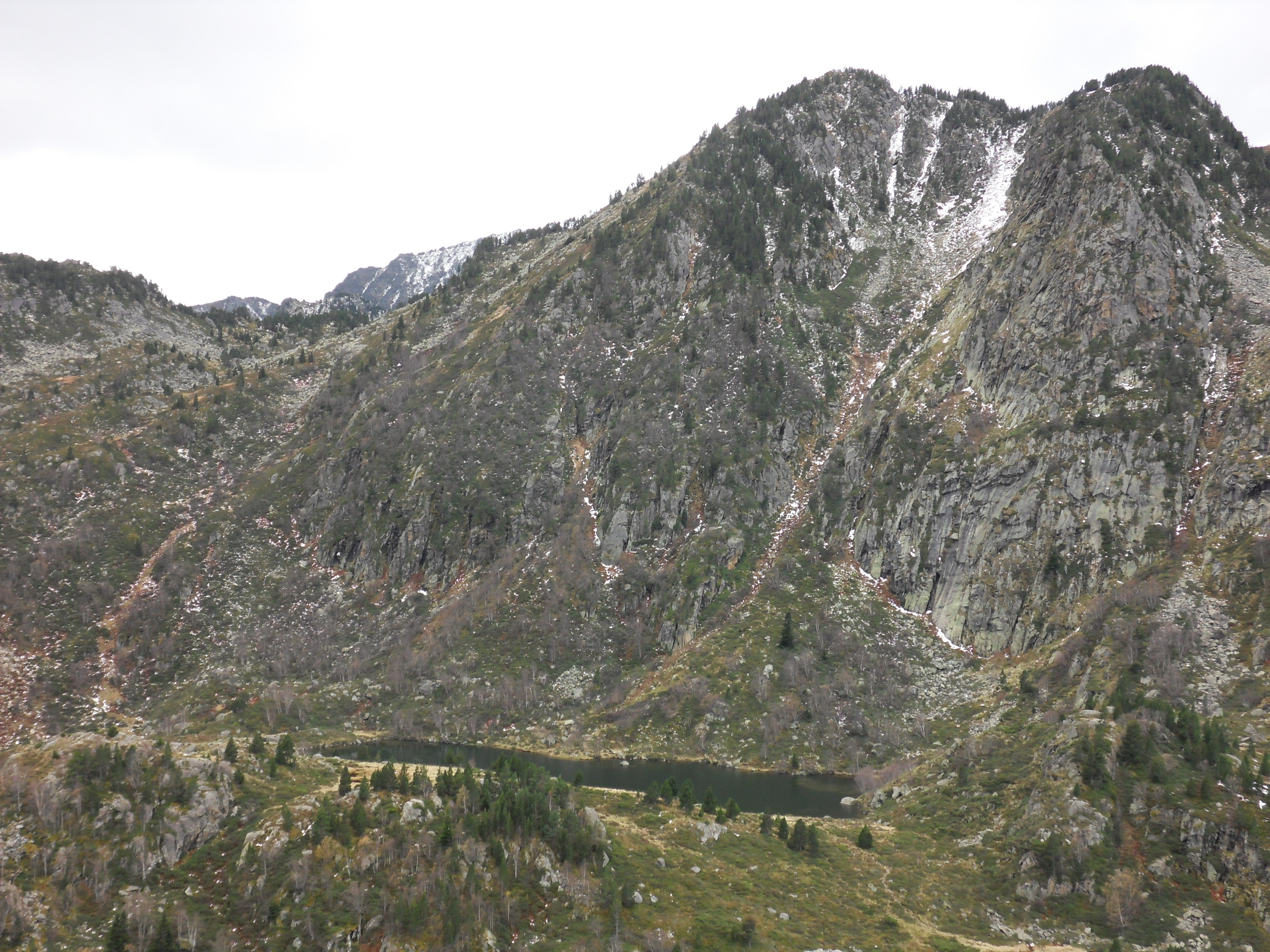
- View of the Étang de Larnoum one of many Étangs in the commune
- Location of Aston
- Location within France Location within Occitanie
- Coordinates: 42°46′32″N 1°40′27″E
- Country: France
- Region: Occitania
- Department: Ariège
- Arrondissement: Foix
- Canton: Haute-Ariège
- Intercommunality: CC Haute Ariège

Government
  - Mayor (2020–2026): Alain Pujol
- Area^{1}: 153.8 km^{2} (59.4 sq mi)
- Elevation: 560 m (1,840 ft)
- Highest elevation: 2,912 m (9,554 ft)
- Lowest elevation: 554 m (1,818 ft)
- Population (2023): 197
  - Density: 1.28/km^{2} (3.32/sq mi)
- Time zone: UTC+01:00 (CET)
  - Summer (DST): UTC+02:00 (CEST)
- INSEE/Postal code: 09024 /09310
- ^{1} French Land Register data, which excludes lakes, ponds, glaciers > 1 km^{2} (0.386 sq mi or 247 acres) and river estuaries.

Aston (French pronunciation: [astɔ̃]) is a commune in the Ariège department in the Occitanie region of south-western France.

== Geography ==
Aston is located some 90 km west of Perpignan and 30 km south of Foix. It is located high in the Pyrenees with its southern border the border between France and Andorra. Access to the commune is solely by a local road from Les Cabannes in the north to the village which lies at the northern tip of the commune. The D522 road from Les Cabannes passes down the eastern border of the commune in a tortuous route which terminates at the Angaka ski resort just east of the commune. Except for a very small area around the village the commune is extremely rugged and heavily forested.

The Aston river rises in the south of the commune and flows north, passing through the village, to join the Ariège at Les Cabannes, gathering a very large number of tributaries from all corners of the commune.

=== Climate ===
Climate data for Aston (1991–2020 averages, 2002–2024 extremes): elevation 1781m
Month	Jan	Feb	Mar	Apr	May	Jun	Jul	Aug	Sep	Oct	Nov	Dec	Year
Record high °C (°F)	15.7 (60.3)	16.2 (61.2)	17.4 (63.3)	20.3 (68.5)	25.5 (77.9)	30.2 (86.4)	30.2 (86.4)	29.6 (85.3)	26.2 (79.2)	23.1 (73.6)	20.5 (68.9)	16.8 (62.2)	30.2 (86.4)
Mean daily maximum °C (°F)	3.5 (38.3)	2.8 (37.0)	5.1 (41.2)	7.7 (45.9)	11.1 (52.0)	15.8 (60.4)	18.1 (64.6)	18.0 (64.4)	14.5 (58.1)	11.8 (53.2)	6.7 (44.1)	4.6 (40.3)	10.0 (50.0)
Daily mean °C (°F)	−0.4 (31.3)	−1.3 (29.7)	1.0 (33.8)	3.9 (39.0)	7.2 (45.0)	11.6 (52.9)	13.6 (56.5)	13.5 (56.3)	10.4 (50.7)	7.9 (46.2)	3.0 (37.4)	0.7 (33.3)	5.9 (42.7)
Mean daily minimum °C (°F)	−4.3 (24.3)	−5.4 (22.3)	−3.0 (26.6)	0.1 (32.2)	3.2 (37.8)	7.5 (45.5)	9.1 (48.4)	9.1 (48.4)	6.3 (43.3)	3.9 (39.0)	−0.6 (30.9)	−3.2 (26.2)	1.9 (35.4)
Record low °C (°F)	−17.9 (−0.2)	−21.3 (−6.3)	−21.0 (−5.8)	−10.5 (13.1)	−7.2 (19.0)	−2.5 (27.5)	0.8 (33.4)	0.0 (32.0)	−4.0 (24.8)	−10.4 (13.3)	−14.1 (6.6)	−14.8 (5.4)	−21.3 (−6.3)
Average precipitation mm (inches)	93.8 (3.69)	80.1 (3.15)	86.9 (3.42)	105.9 (4.17)	127.2 (5.01)	98.5 (3.88)	92.6 (3.65)	79.2 (3.12)	78.8 (3.10)	82.1 (3.23)	101.0 (3.98)	77.8 (3.06)	1,103.9 (43.46)
Source: Meteociel

== Administration ==
List of Successive Mayors

From	To	Name
2001	2020	Jean Lasalle
2020	2026	Alain Pujol

== Demography ==
The inhabitants of the commune are known as Astonnais or Astonnaises in French.

Historical population

Year	Pop.	±% p.a.
1800	266	—
1821	466	+2.71%
1846	586	+0.92%
1872	502	−0.59%
1901	334	−1.40%
1926	211	−1.82%
1946	318	+2.07%
1962	215	−2.42%
1968	201	−1.12%

Year	Pop.	±% p.a.
1975	180	−1.56%
1982	321	+8.62%
1990	231	−4.03%
1999	241	+0.47%
2007	236	−0.26%
2012	220	−1.39%
2017	220	+0.00%
2023	197	−1.82%

Source: EHESS and INSEE

== Economy ==
The commune has two dams for the generation of Hydroelectricity: the Laparan and the Riète. They are operated by Électricité de France.

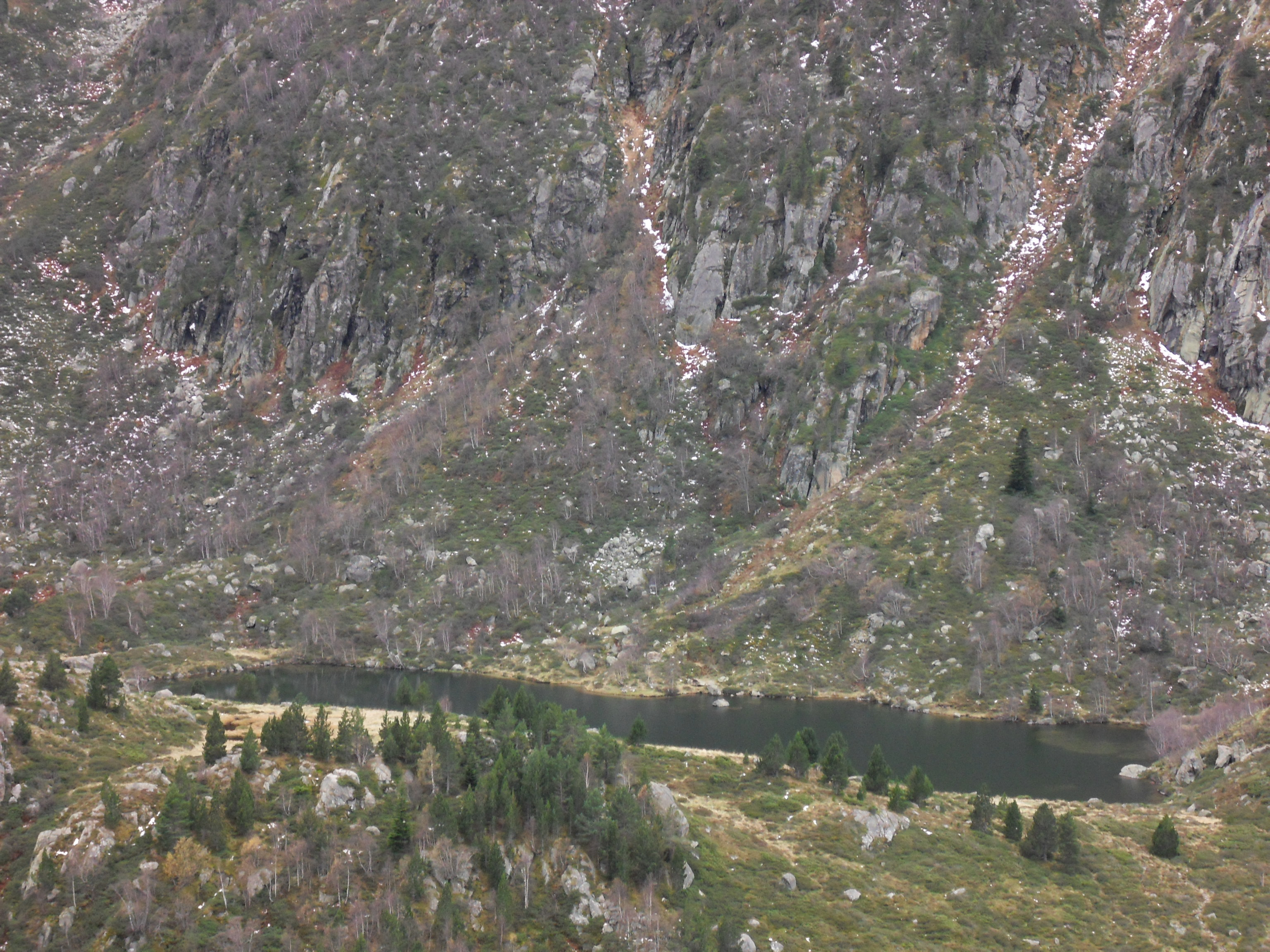
The Étang de Larnoum in autumn

== Sites and monuments ==
- The Étang de Larnoum

== See also ==
- Communes of the Ariège department
