= Lordat =

Commune in Occitanie, France

- Commune
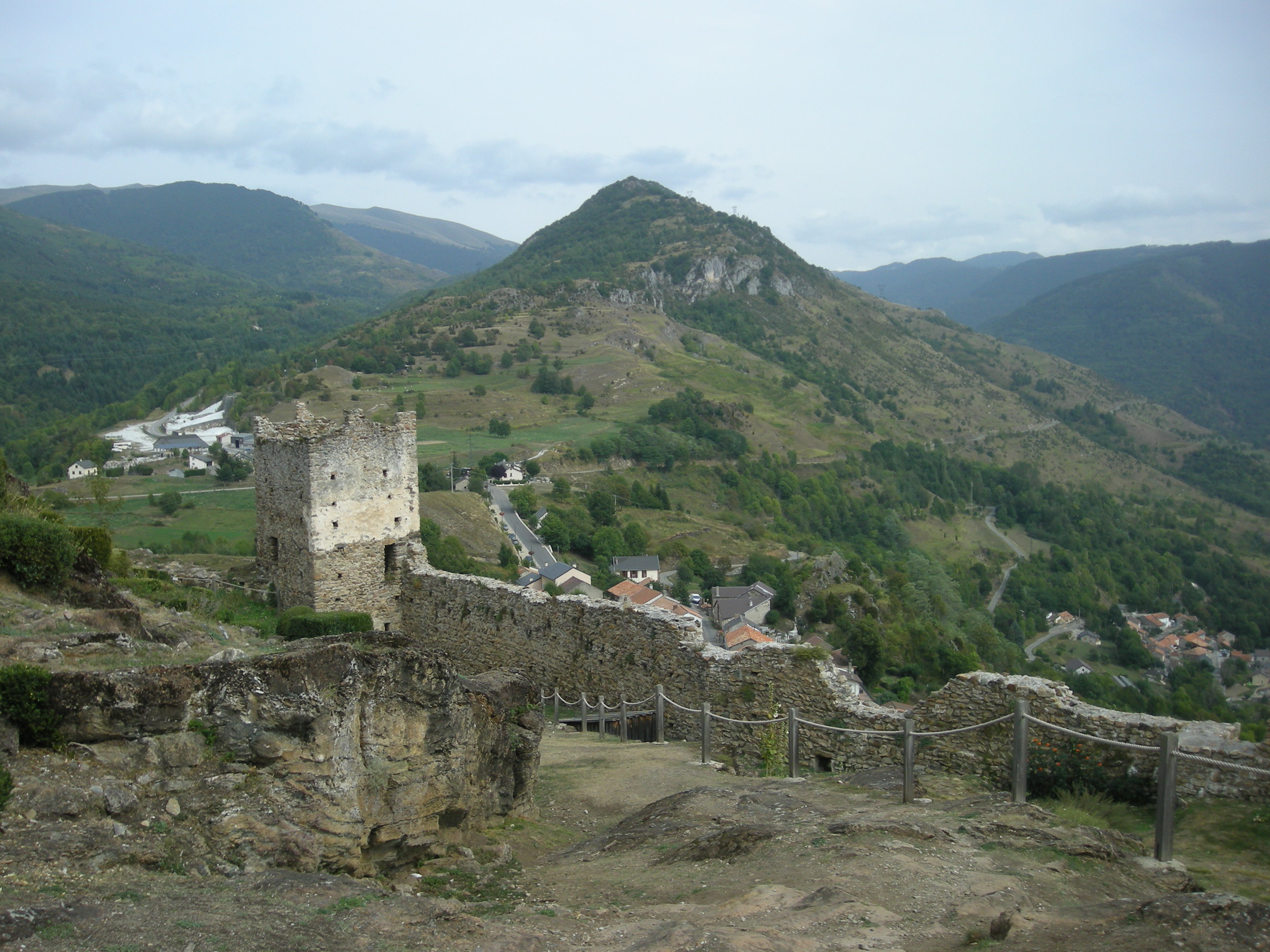
- Castle and villages of Lordat

- Coat of arms
- Location of Lordat
- Location within France Location within Occitanie
- Coordinates: 42°46′37″N 1°45′08″E
- Country: France
- Region: Occitania
- Department: Ariège
- Arrondissement: Foix
- Canton: Haute-Ariège

Government
  - Mayor (2020–2026): Christian Marcaillou
- Area^{1}: 7.37 km^{2} (2.85 sq mi)
- Elevation: 935 m (3,068 ft)
- Highest elevation: 2,321 m (7,615 ft)
- Lowest elevation: 680 m (2,230 ft)
- Population (2023): 59
  - Density: 8.0/km^{2} (21/sq mi)
- Time zone: UTC+01:00 (CET)
  - Summer (DST): UTC+02:00 (CEST)
- INSEE/Postal code: 09171 /09250
- ^{1} French Land Register data, which excludes lakes, ponds, glaciers > 1 km^{2} (0.386 sq mi or 247 acres) and river estuaries.

Lordat is a commune in the Ariège department in southwestern France.

== Population ==
Historical population
Year	Pop.	±% p.a.
1968	56	—
1975	54	−0.52%
1982	50	−1.09%
1990	41	−2.45%
1999	43	+0.53%
2007	36	−2.20%
2012	47	+5.48%
2017	68	+7.67%
2023	59	−2.34%
Source: INSEE

== See also ==
- Communes of the Ariège department
