= Vèbre =

Commune in Occitanie, France

- Commune
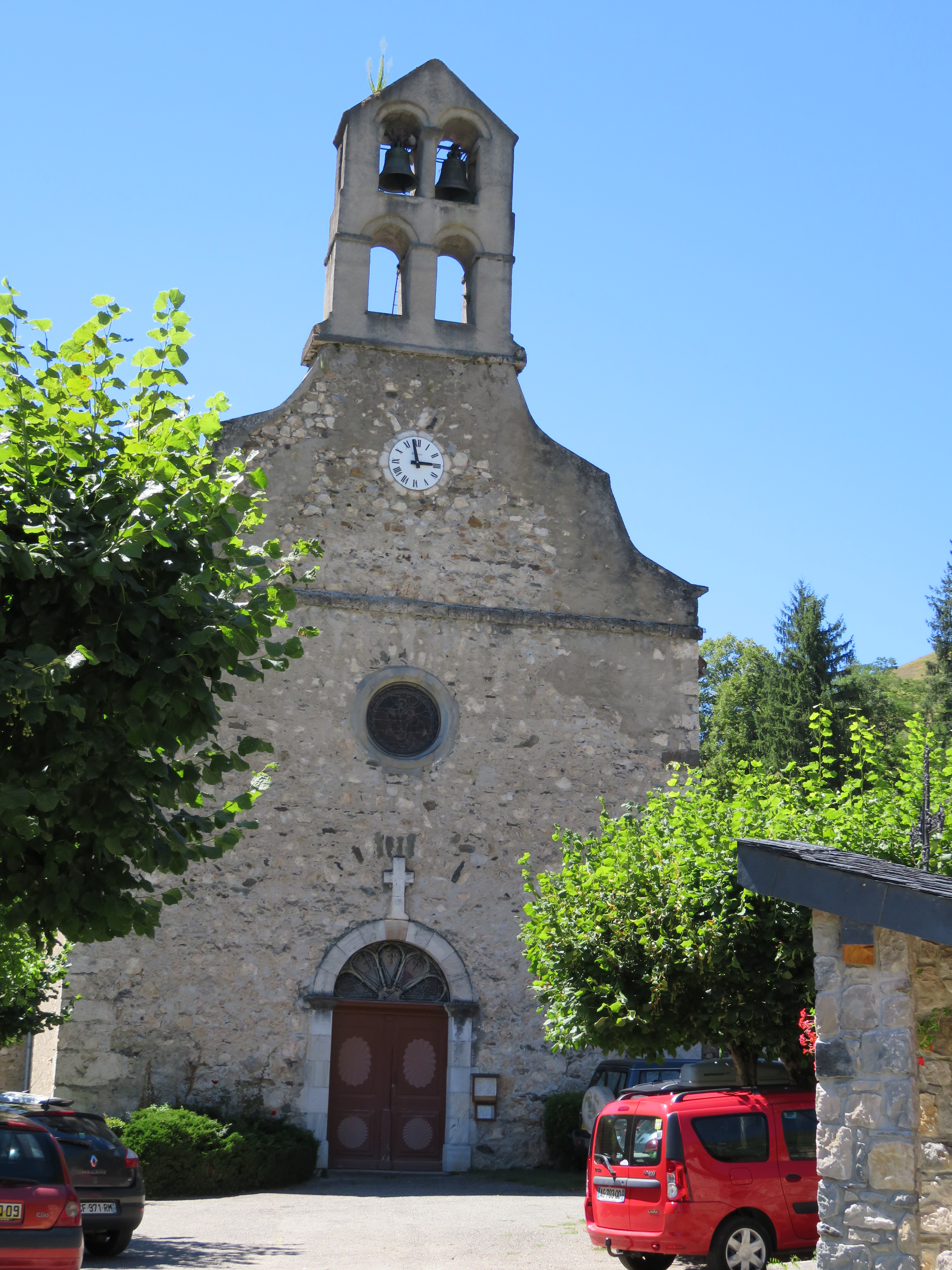
- The Church of Vèbre
- Location of Vèbre
- Location within France Location within Occitanie
- Coordinates: 42°46′35″N 1°43′22″E
- Country: France
- Region: Occitania
- Department: Ariège
- Arrondissement: Foix
- Canton: Haute-Ariège

Government
  - Mayor (2020–2026): Jean Rouzoul
- Area^{1}: 5.19 km^{2} (2.00 sq mi)
- Elevation: 564 m (1,850 ft)
- Highest elevation: 1,485 m (4,872 ft)
- Lowest elevation: 552 m (1,811 ft)
- Population (2023): 113
  - Density: 21.8/km^{2} (56.4/sq mi)
- Time zone: UTC+01:00 (CET)
  - Summer (DST): UTC+02:00 (CEST)
- INSEE/Postal code: 09326 /09310
- ^{1} French Land Register data, which excludes lakes, ponds, glaciers > 1 km^{2} (0.386 sq mi or 247 acres) and river estuaries.

Vèbre (French pronunciation: [vɛbʁ]; Occitan: Brèbe) is a commune in the Ariège department in southwestern France.

== Population ==
Inhabitants of Vèbre are called Vebrois in French.

Historical population
Year	Pop.	±% p.a.
1968	149	—
1975	129	−2.04%
1982	130	+0.11%
1990	128	−0.19%
1999	124	−0.35%
2007	139	+1.44%
2012	129	−1.48%
2017	125	−0.63%
2023	113	−1.67%
Source: INSEE

== See also ==
- Communes of the Ariège department
