= Canton of Haute-Ariège =

Coordinates: 42.72°N 1.84°E

- Canton
- Situation of the canton of Haute-Ariège in the department of Ariège
- Country: France
- Region: Occitania
- Department: Ariège
- No. of communes: {{{nbcomm}}}
- Population (2023): 6,348
- INSEE code: 0901

The canton of Haute-Ariège is an administrative division of the Ariège department, southern France. It was created at the French canton reorganisation which came into effect in March 2015. Its seat is in Ax-les-Thermes.

It consists of the following communes:

1. Albiès
2. Appy
3. Artigues
4. Ascou
5. Aston
6. Aulos-Sinsat
7. Axiat
8. Ax-les-Thermes
9. Bestiac
10. Bouan
11. Les Cabannes
12. Carcanières
13. Caussou
14. Caychax-et-Senconac
15. Château-Verdun
16. Garanou
17. L'Hospitalet-près-l'Andorre
18. Ignaux
19. Larcat
20. Larnat
21. Lassur
22. Lordat
23. Luzenac
24. Mérens-les-Vals
25. Mijanès
26. Montaillou
27. Orgeix
28. Orlu
29. Ornolac-Ussat-les-Bains
30. Pech
31. Perles-et-Castelet
32. Le Pla
33. Prades
34. Le Puch
35. Quérigut
36. Rouze
37. Savignac-les-Ormeaux
38. Sorgeat
39. Tignac
40. Unac
41. Urs
42. Ussat
43. Vaychis
44. Vèbre
45. Verdun
46. Vernaux
