= Orgeix =

Commune in Occitanie, France

- Commune
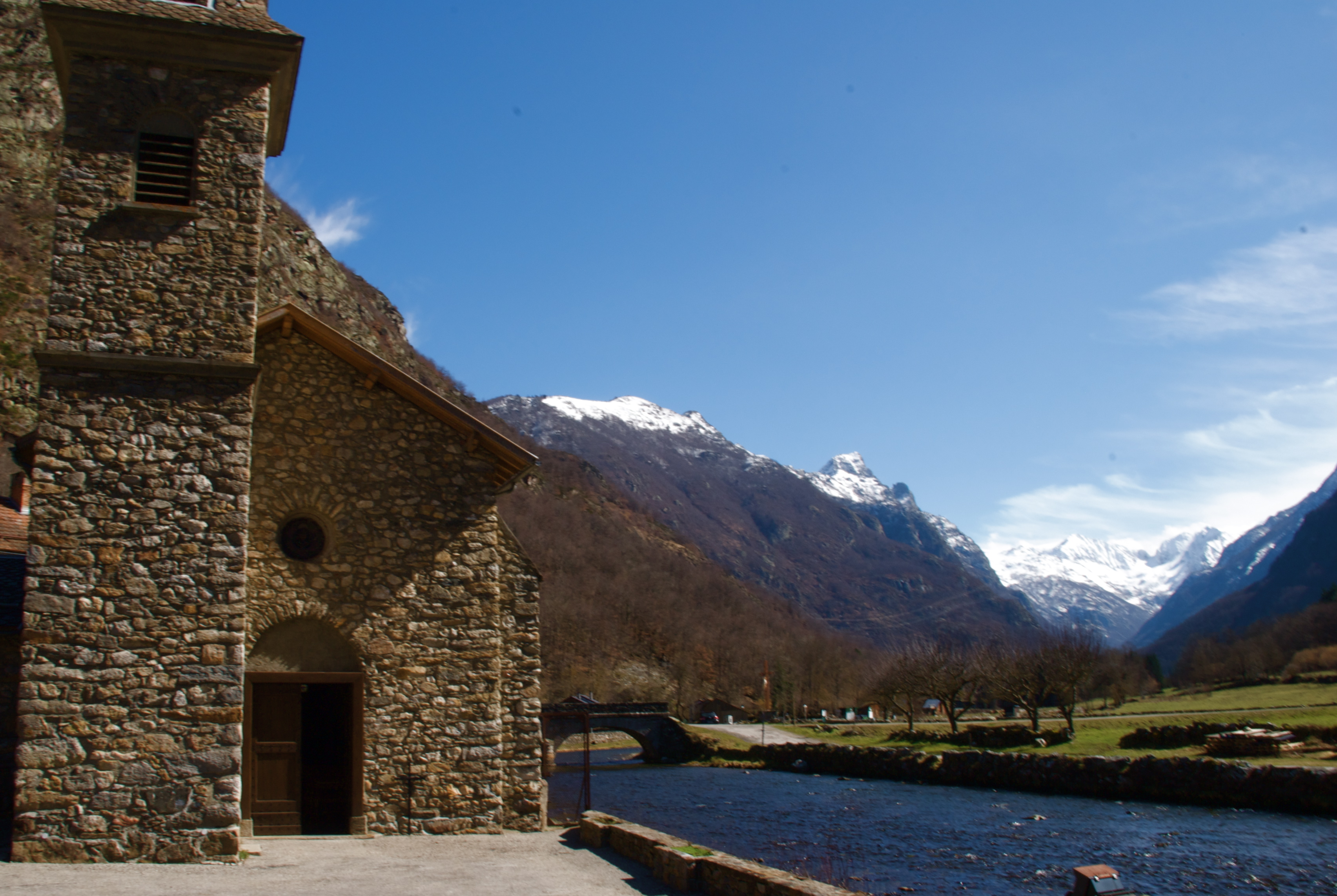
- The church and surroundings in Orgeix
- Location of Orgeix
- Location within France Location within Occitanie
- Coordinates: 42°42′35″N 1°52′02″E
- Country: France
- Region: Occitania
- Department: Ariège
- Arrondissement: Foix
- Canton: Haute-Ariège

Government
  - Mayor (2020–2026): Betty Gonzalez
- Area^{1}: 18.39 km^{2} (7.10 sq mi)
- Elevation: 820 m (2,690 ft)
- Highest elevation: 2,481 m (8,140 ft)
- Lowest elevation: 800 m (2,600 ft)
- Population (2023): 102
  - Density: 5.55/km^{2} (14.4/sq mi)
- Time zone: UTC+01:00 (CET)
  - Summer (DST): UTC+02:00 (CEST)
- INSEE/Postal code: 09218 /09110
- ^{1} French Land Register data, which excludes lakes, ponds, glaciers > 1 km^{2} (0.386 sq mi or 247 acres) and river estuaries.

Orgeix (Occitan: Ordi) is a commune in the Ariège department in southwestern France.

It is located just two kilometers from the hot springs and ski resort Ax-les-Thermes and European Route E09

== Population ==
Inhabitants are called Orgeixois in French.

Historical population
Year	Pop.	±% p.a.
1968	61	—
1975	61	+0.00%
1982	53	−1.99%
1990	65	+2.58%
1999	71	+0.99%
2007	96	+3.84%
2012	82	−3.10%
2017	87	+1.19%
2023	102	+2.69%
Source: INSEE

== See also ==
- Communes of the Ariège department
