= Bouan =

Commune in Occitanie, France

- Commune
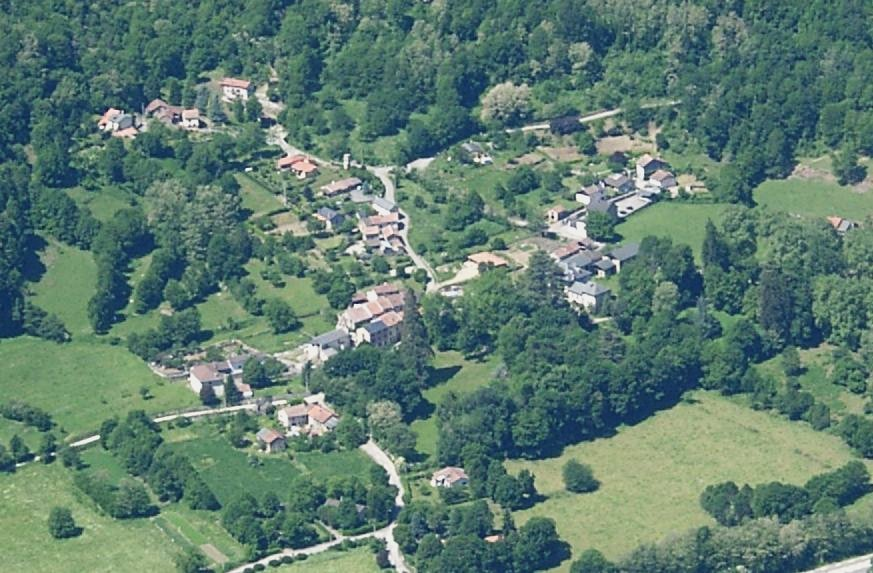
- An overhead view of Bouan
- Location of Bouan
- Location within France Location within Occitanie
- Coordinates: 42°48′05″N 1°38′54″E
- Country: France
- Region: Occitania
- Department: Ariège
- Arrondissement: Foix
- Canton: Haute-Ariège

Government
  - Mayor (2020–2026): Chantal Martin
- Area^{1}: 3.44 km^{2} (1.33 sq mi)
- Elevation: 502 m (1,647 ft)
- Highest elevation: 1,535 m (5,036 ft)
- Lowest elevation: 491 m (1,611 ft)
- Population (2023): 41
  - Density: 12/km^{2} (31/sq mi)
- Time zone: UTC+01:00 (CET)
  - Summer (DST): UTC+02:00 (CEST)
- INSEE/Postal code: 09064 /09310
- ^{1} French Land Register data, which excludes lakes, ponds, glaciers > 1 km^{2} (0.386 sq mi or 247 acres) and river estuaries.

Bouan (French pronunciation: [bwɑ̃]; Occitan: Boan) is a commune in the Ariège department of southwestern France.

== Population ==
Historical population
| Year | Pop. | ±% p.a. |
|---|---|---|
| 1968 | 58 | — |
| 1975 | 43 | −4.18% |
| 1982 | 37 | −2.12% |
| 1990 | 29 | −3.00% |
| 1999 | 30 | +0.38% |
| 2007 | 34 | +1.58% |
| 2012 | 36 | +1.15% |
| 2017 | 38 | +1.09% |
| 2023 | 41 | +1.27% |
Source: INSEE

Inhabitants of Bouan are called Bouannais in French.

== See also ==
- Communes of the Ariège department
