= Larcat =

Commune in Occitanie, France

- Commune
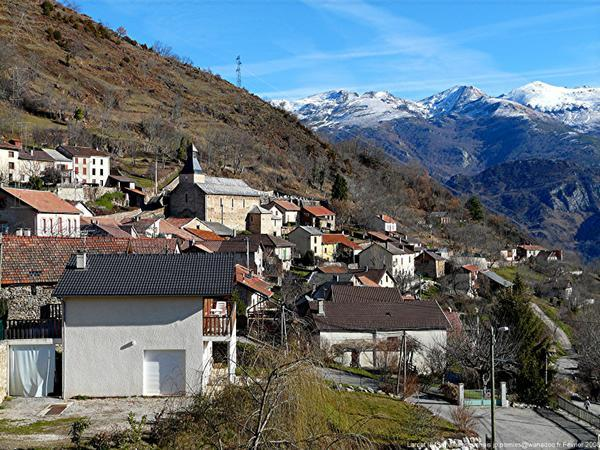
- A general view of Larcat
- Location of Larcat
- Location within France Location within Occitanie
- Coordinates: 42°46′47″N 1°39′44″E
- Country: France
- Region: Occitania
- Department: Ariège
- Arrondissement: Foix
- Canton: Haute-Ariège

Government
  - Mayor (2020–2026): Didier Carbonell
- Area^{1}: 9.31 km^{2} (3.59 sq mi)
- Elevation: 720 m (2,360 ft)
- Highest elevation: 1,840 m (6,040 ft)
- Lowest elevation: 686 m (2,251 ft)
- Population (2023): 50
  - Density: 5.4/km^{2} (14/sq mi)
- Time zone: UTC+01:00 (CET)
  - Summer (DST): UTC+02:00 (CEST)
- INSEE/Postal code: 09155 /09310
- ^{1} French Land Register data, which excludes lakes, ponds, glaciers > 1 km^{2} (0.386 sq mi or 247 acres) and river estuaries.

Larcat is a commune in the Ariège department in southwestern France.

== Population ==
Historical population
Year	Pop.	±% p.a.
1968	64	—
1975	59	−1.16%
1982	51	−2.06%
1990	44	−1.83%
1999	33	−3.15%
2007	39	+2.11%
2012	37	−1.05%
2017	44	+3.53%
2023	50	+2.15%
Source: INSEE

== See also ==
- Communes of the Ariège department
