= Tignac =

Commune in Occitanie, France

- Commune
- Location of Tignac
- Location within France Location within Occitanie
- Coordinates: 42°44′48″N 1°47′45″E
- Country: France
- Region: Occitania
- Department: Ariège
- Arrondissement: Foix
- Canton: Haute-Ariège

Government
  - Mayor (2020–2026): Joseph Ferrand
- Area^{1}: 3.53 km^{2} (1.36 sq mi)
- Elevation: 840 m (2,760 ft)
- Highest elevation: 1,440 m (4,720 ft)
- Lowest elevation: 720 m (2,360 ft)
- Population (2023): 20
  - Density: 5.7/km^{2} (15/sq mi)
- Time zone: UTC+01:00 (CET)
  - Summer (DST): UTC+02:00 (CEST)
- INSEE/Postal code: 09311 /09110
- ^{1} French Land Register data, which excludes lakes, ponds, glaciers > 1 km^{2} (0.386 sq mi or 247 acres) and river estuaries.

Tignac (French pronunciation: [tiɲak]; Occitan: Tinhac) is a commune in the Ariège department in southwestern France.

== Population ==
Inhabitants of Tignac are called Tignacois in French.

Historical population
Year	Pop.	±% p.a.
1968	23	—
1975	21	−1.29%
1982	14	−5.63%
1990	10	−4.12%
1999	15	+4.61%
2007	27	+7.62%
2012	19	−6.79%
2017	25	+5.64%
2023	20	−3.65%
Source: INSEE

== See also ==
- Communes of the Ariège department
