= Pech, Ariège =

Commune in Occitanie, France

Pech
- Commune
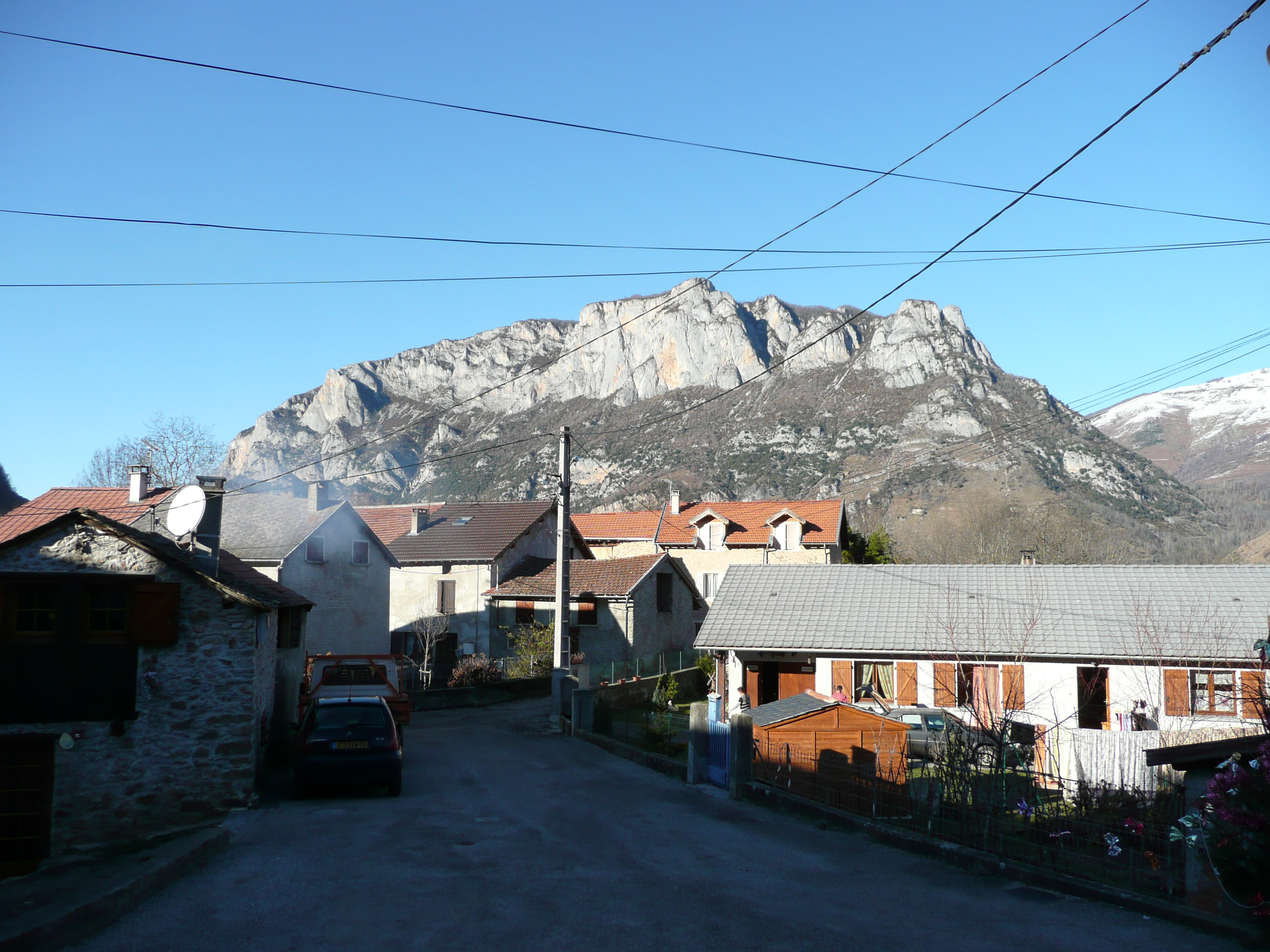
- The Montels Quarter in Pech
- Location of Pech
- Location within France Location within Occitanie
- Coordinates: 42°47′02″N 1°41′14″E
- Country: France
- Region: Occitania
- Department: Ariège
- Arrondissement: Foix
- Canton: Haute-Ariège
- Intercommunality: Haute Ariège

Government
  - Mayor (2020–2026): Véronique Subra
- Area^{1}: 4.81 km^{2} (1.86 sq mi)
- Elevation: 545 m (1,788 ft)
- Highest elevation: 1,729 m (5,673 ft)
- Lowest elevation: 533 m (1,749 ft)
- Population (2023): 36
  - Density: 7.5/km^{2} (19/sq mi)
- Time zone: UTC+01:00 (CET)
  - Summer (DST): UTC+02:00 (CEST)
- INSEE/Postal code: 09226 /09310
- ^{1} French Land Register data, which excludes lakes, ponds, glaciers > 1 km^{2} (0.386 sq mi or 247 acres) and river estuaries.

Pech (French pronunciation: [pɛʃ]; Occitan: Puèg) is a commune in the Ariège department of southwestern France.

== Population ==
Historical population
Year	Pop.	±% p.a.
1968	48	—
1975	30	−6.49%
1982	21	−4.97%
1990	27	+3.19%
1999	34	+2.59%
2007	28	−2.40%
2012	48	+11.38%
2017	37	−5.07%
2023	36	−0.46%
Source: INSEE

Inhabitants of Pech are called Péchois in French.

== See also ==
- Communes of the Ariège department
