= Perles-et-Castelet =

Commune in Occitanie, France

- Commune
- Location of Perles-et-Castelet
- Location within France Location within Occitanie
- Coordinates: 42°44′41″N 1°47′15″E
- Country: France
- Region: Occitania
- Department: Ariège
- Arrondissement: Foix
- Canton: Haute-Ariège

Government
  - Mayor (2020–2026): Gérard Durand
- Area^{1}: 17.77 km^{2} (6.86 sq mi)
- Elevation: 740 m (2,430 ft)
- Highest elevation: 2,243 m (7,359 ft)
- Lowest elevation: 618 m (2,028 ft)
- Population (2023): 218
  - Density: 12.3/km^{2} (31.8/sq mi)
- Time zone: UTC+01:00 (CET)
  - Summer (DST): UTC+02:00 (CEST)
- INSEE/Postal code: 09228 /09110
- ^{1} French Land Register data, which excludes lakes, ponds, glaciers > 1 km^{2} (0.386 sq mi or 247 acres) and river estuaries.

Perles-et-Castelet (French pronunciation: [pɛʁl e kastəlɛ]; Occitan: Pèrlas e Castelhet) is a commune in the Ariège department in southwestern France.

== Population ==
Inhabitants are called Perlois in French.

Historical population
Year	Pop.	±% p.a.
1968	157	—
1975	130	−2.66%
1982	119	−1.26%
1990	157	+3.52%
1999	160	+0.21%
2007	182	+1.62%
2012	206	+2.51%
2017	223	+1.60%
2023	218	−0.38%
Source: INSEE

== See also ==
- Communes of the Ariège department
