= Sorgeat =

Commune in Occitanie, France

- Commune
- Location of Sorgeat
- Location within France Location within Occitanie
- Coordinates: 42°43′49″N 1°51′06″E
- Country: France
- Region: Occitania
- Department: Ariège
- Arrondissement: Foix
- Canton: Haute-Ariège

Government
  - Mayor (2020–2026): Jérôme Barre
- Area^{1}: 18.92 km^{2} (7.31 sq mi)
- Elevation: 1,048 m (3,438 ft)
- Highest elevation: 1,853 m (6,079 ft)
- Lowest elevation: 910 m (2,990 ft)
- Population (2023): 89
  - Density: 4.7/km^{2} (12/sq mi)
- Time zone: UTC+01:00 (CET)
  - Summer (DST): UTC+02:00 (CEST)
- INSEE/Postal code: 09298 /09110
- ^{1} French Land Register data, which excludes lakes, ponds, glaciers > 1 km^{2} (0.386 sq mi or 247 acres) and river estuaries.

Sorgeat (French pronunciation: [sɔʁʒa]; Occitan: Sorjat) is a commune in the Ariège department in southwestern France.

== Population ==
Inhabitants of Sorgeat are called Sorgeatois in French.

Historical population
Year	Pop.	±% p.a.
1968	80	—
1975	78	−0.36%
1982	69	−1.74%
1990	81	+2.02%
1999	96	+1.91%
2007	96	+0.00%
2012	93	−0.63%
2017	82	−2.49%
2023	89	+1.37%
Source: INSEE

== See also ==
- Communes of the Ariège department
