= Verdun, Ariège =

Commune in Occitanie, France

Verdun
- Commune
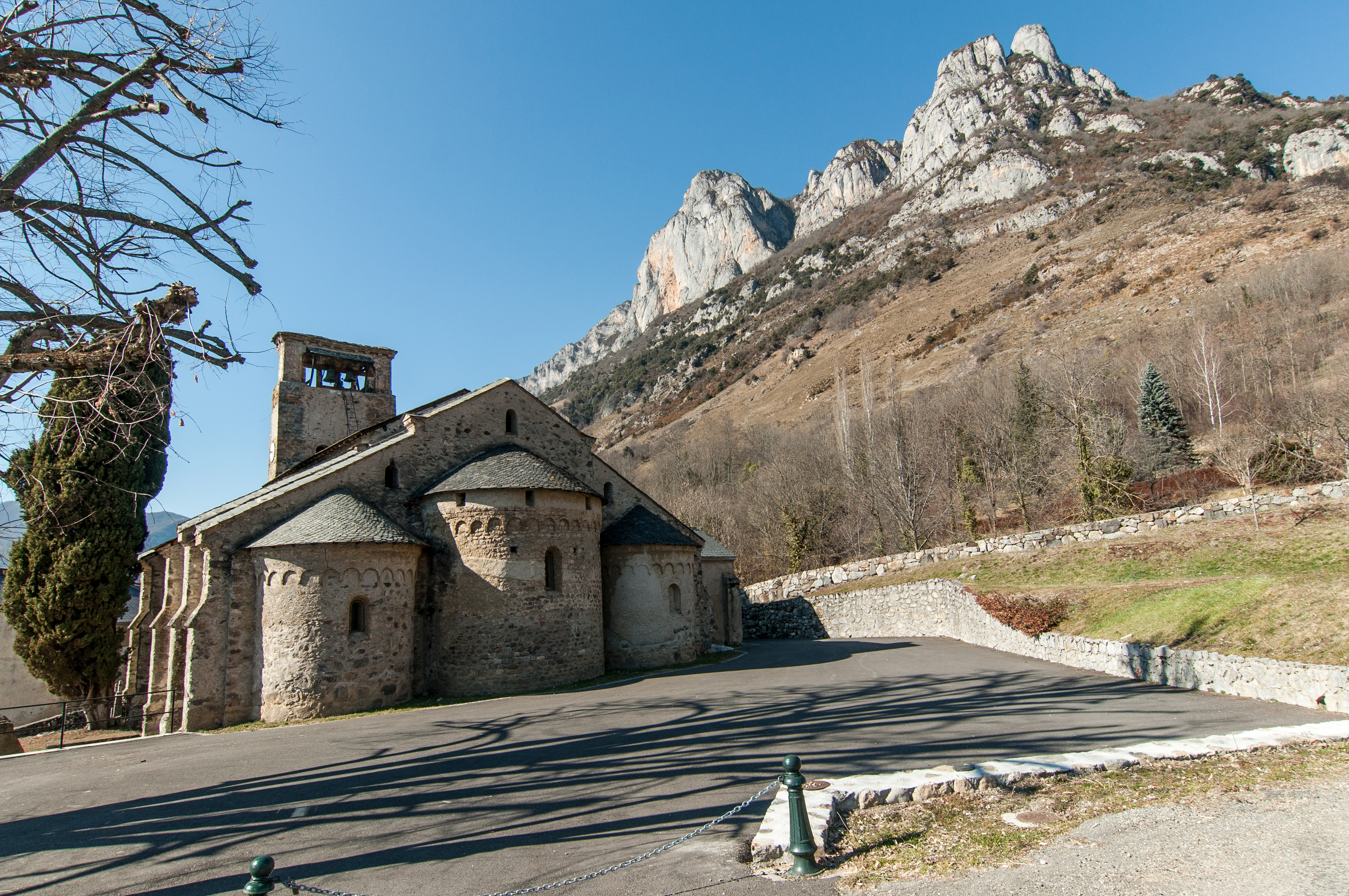
- The church in Verdun
- Location of Verdun
- Location within France Location within Occitanie
- Coordinates: 42°47′43″N 1°41′20″E
- Country: France
- Region: Occitania
- Department: Ariège
- Arrondissement: Foix
- Canton: Haute-Ariège

Government
  - Mayor (2020–2026): Alain Miquel
- Area^{1}: 11.71 km^{2} (4.52 sq mi)
- Elevation: 548 m (1,798 ft)
- Highest elevation: 1,461 m (4,793 ft)
- Lowest elevation: 513 m (1,683 ft)
- Population (2023): 209
  - Density: 17.8/km^{2} (46.2/sq mi)
- Time zone: UTC+01:00 (CET)
  - Summer (DST): UTC+02:00 (CEST)
- INSEE/Postal code: 09328 /09310
- ^{1} French Land Register data, which excludes lakes, ponds, glaciers > 1 km^{2} (0.386 sq mi or 247 acres) and river estuaries.

Verdun (French pronunciation: [vɛʁdœ̃]) is a commune in the Ariège department, southwestern France.

== Geography ==
Verdun is located in the upper Ariège valley, in the Pyrénées.

== Population ==
Inhabitants of Verdun are called Verdunois in French.

Historical population
Year	Pop.	±% p.a.
1968	210	—
1975	184	−1.87%
1982	160	−1.98%
1990	154	−0.48%
1999	183	+1.94%
2007	235	+3.18%
2012	228	−0.60%
2017	221	−0.62%
2023	209	−0.93%
Source: INSEE

== Sights ==
The village contains a Romanesque medieval church.

== See also ==
- Communes of the Ariège department
