= Ignaux =

Commune in Occitanie, France

- Commune
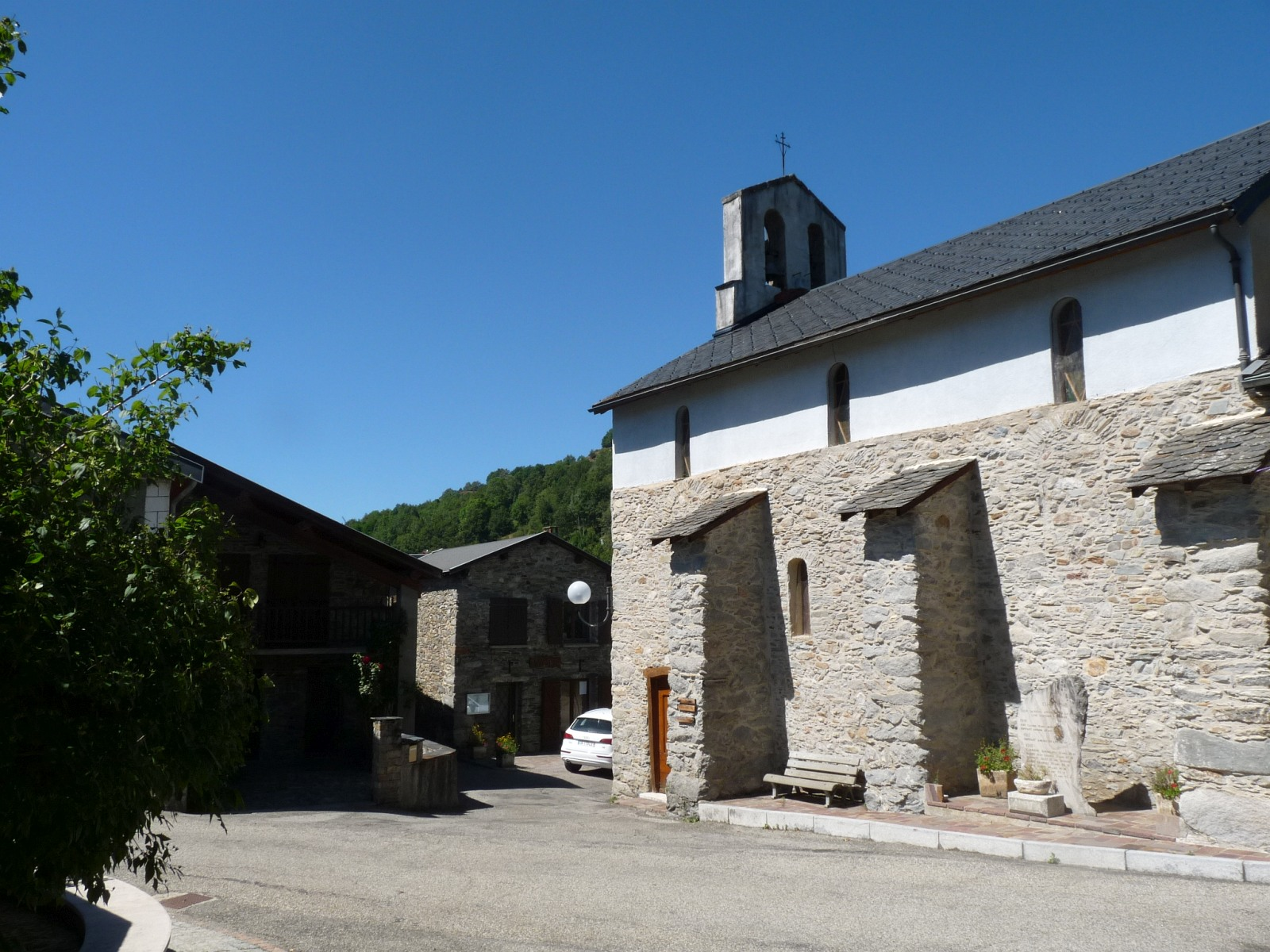
- Town hall
- Location of Ignaux
- Location within France Location within Occitanie
- Coordinates: 42°43′56″N 1°50′27″E
- Country: France
- Region: Occitania
- Department: Ariège
- Arrondissement: Foix
- Canton: Haute-Ariège
- Intercommunality: Haute-Ariège

Government
  - Mayor (2020–2026): Michel Barre
- Area^{1}: 5.49 km^{2} (2.12 sq mi)
- Elevation: 950 m (3,120 ft)
- Highest elevation: 1,722 m (5,650 ft)
- Lowest elevation: 840 m (2,760 ft)
- Population (2023): 126
  - Density: 23.0/km^{2} (59.4/sq mi)
- Time zone: UTC+01:00 (CET)
  - Summer (DST): UTC+02:00 (CEST)
- INSEE/Postal code: 09140 /09110
- ^{1} French Land Register data, which excludes lakes, ponds, glaciers > 1 km^{2} (0.386 sq mi or 247 acres) and river estuaries.

Ignaux (French pronunciation: [iɲo]; Occitan: Inhaus) is a commune in the Ariège department in southwestern France.

== Location ==
Ignaux is 33 km from Foix, the department capital. It is 36 km from Andorra and the French border with Spain.

The closest airport to Ignaux is Carcassonne Airport (66 km).

== Population ==
Historical population
Year	Pop.	±% p.a.
1968	32	—
1975	21	−5.84%
1982	20	−0.69%
1990	31	+5.63%
1999	59	+7.41%
2007	71	+2.34%
2012	114	+9.93%
2017	113	−0.18%
2023	126	+1.83%
Source: INSEE

== See also ==
- Communes of the Ariège department
