= Vernaux =

Commune in Occitanie, France

- Commune
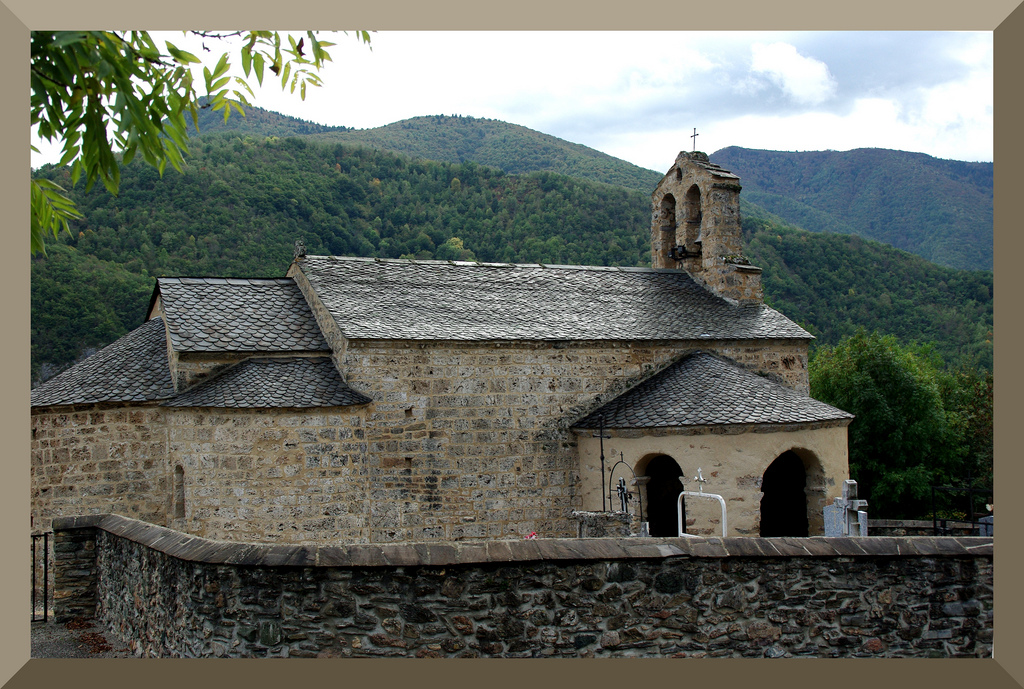
- The church in Vernaux
- Location of Vernaux
- Location within France Location within Occitanie
- Coordinates: 42°46′24″N 1°45′32″E
- Country: France
- Region: Occitania
- Department: Ariège
- Arrondissement: Foix
- Canton: Haute-Ariège
- Intercommunality: Haute Ariège

Government
  - Mayor (2020–2026): Maxime Martuchou
- Area^{1}: 6.06 km^{2} (2.34 sq mi)
- Elevation: 800 m (2,600 ft)
- Highest elevation: 2,081 m (6,827 ft)
- Lowest elevation: 639 m (2,096 ft)
- Population (2023): 36
  - Density: 5.9/km^{2} (15/sq mi)
- Time zone: UTC+01:00 (CET)
  - Summer (DST): UTC+02:00 (CEST)
- INSEE/Postal code: 09330 /09250
- ^{1} French Land Register data, which excludes lakes, ponds, glaciers > 1 km^{2} (0.386 sq mi or 247 acres) and river estuaries.

Vernaux is a commune in the Ariège department in southwestern France.

== Population ==
Inhabitants of Vernaux are called Vernausiens in French.

Historical population
Year	Pop.	±% p.a.
1968	59	—
1975	47	−3.20%
1982	39	−2.63%
1990	38	−0.32%
1999	28	−3.34%
2007	32	+1.68%
2012	33	+0.62%
2017	28	−3.23%
2023	36	+4.28%
Source: INSEE

== See also ==
- Communes of the Ariège department
