= Lassur =

Commune in Occitanie, France

- Commune
- Location of Lassur
- Location within France Location within Occitanie
- Coordinates: 42°46′14″N 1°44′16″E
- Country: France
- Region: Occitania
- Department: Ariège
- Arrondissement: Foix
- Canton: Haute-Ariège

Government
  - Mayor (2020–2026): Richard Martinez
- Area^{1}: 11.99 km^{2} (4.63 sq mi)
- Elevation: 620 m (2,030 ft)
- Highest elevation: 1,946 m (6,385 ft)
- Lowest elevation: 575 m (1,886 ft)
- Population (2023): 82
  - Density: 6.8/km^{2} (18/sq mi)
- Time zone: UTC+01:00 (CET)
  - Summer (DST): UTC+02:00 (CEST)
- INSEE/Postal code: 09159 /09310
- ^{1} French Land Register data, which excludes lakes, ponds, glaciers > 1 km^{2} (0.386 sq mi or 247 acres) and river estuaries.

Lassur (French pronunciation: [lasyʁ]; Occitan: Lhassur) is a commune in the Ariège department in southwestern France.

== Population ==
Historical population
Year	Pop.	±% p.a.
1968	106	—
1975	83	−3.43%
1982	65	−3.43%
1990	55	−2.07%
1999	62	+1.34%
2007	70	+1.53%
2012	60	−3.04%
2017	87	+7.71%
2023	82	−0.98%
Source: INSEE

== See also ==
- Communes of the Ariège department
