= Quérigut =

Commune in Occitanie, France

- Commune
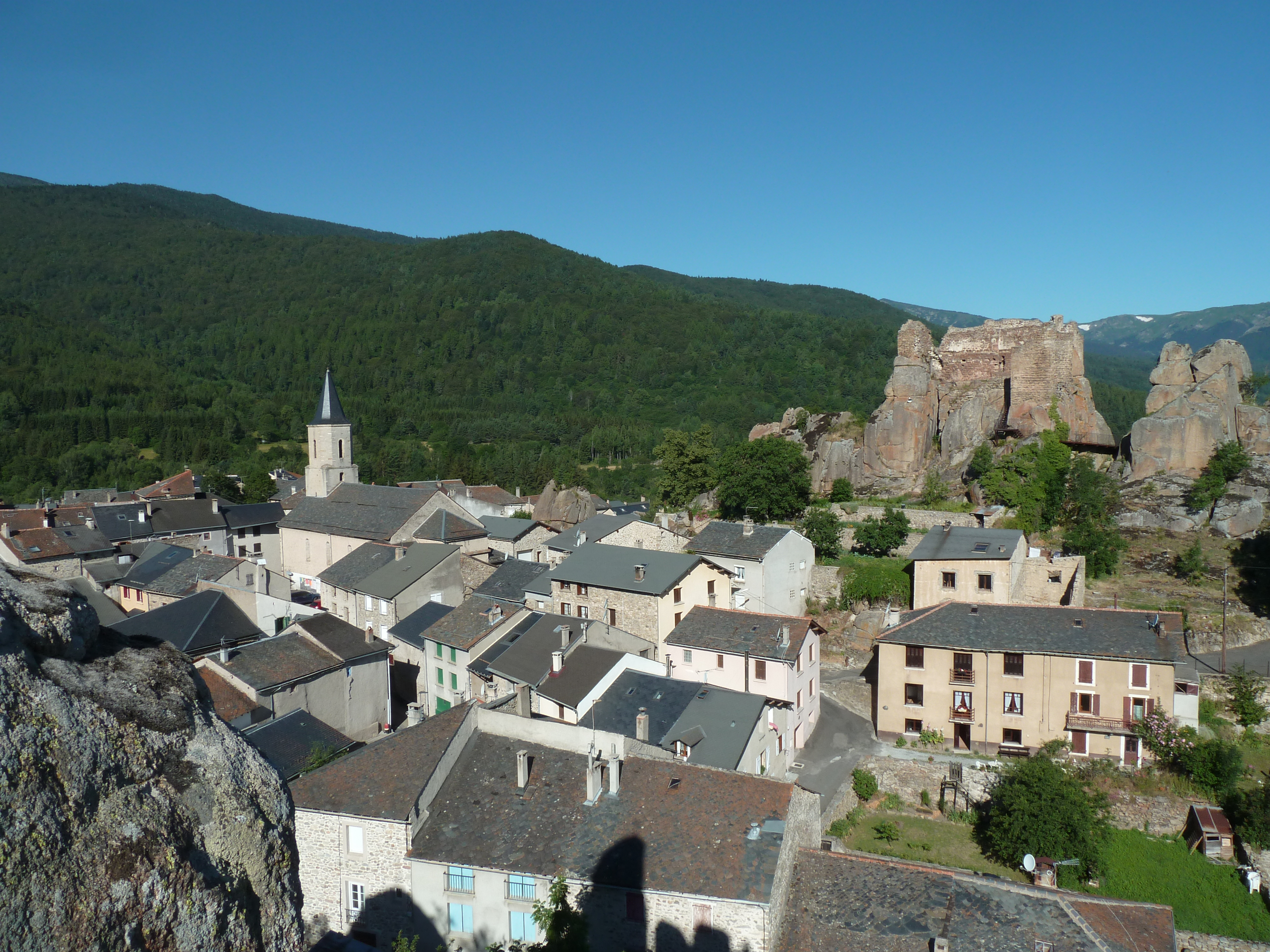
- A general view of Quérigut
- Location of Quérigut
- Location within France Location within Occitanie
- Coordinates: 42°42′00″N 2°05′57″E
- Country: France
- Region: Occitania
- Department: Ariège
- Arrondissement: Foix
- Canton: Haute-Ariège

Government
  - Mayor (2020–2026): Jean-François Bataille
- Area^{1}: 36.4 km^{2} (14.1 sq mi)
- Elevation: 1,250 m (4,100 ft)
- Highest elevation: 2,359 m (7,740 ft)
- Lowest elevation: 1,022 m (3,353 ft)
- Population (2023): 139
  - Density: 3.82/km^{2} (9.89/sq mi)
- Time zone: UTC+01:00 (CET)
  - Summer (DST): UTC+02:00 (CEST)
- INSEE/Postal code: 09239 /09460
- ^{1} French Land Register data, which excludes lakes, ponds, glaciers > 1 km^{2} (0.386 sq mi or 247 acres) and river estuaries.

Quérigut (French pronunciation: [keʁigyt]; Occitan: Quergut) is a commune in the Ariège department in southwestern France.

== History ==
Donezan, of which Quérigut is the capital, was a dependency of the crown of Aragon. In 1208, king Pierre II of Aragon ceded the territory to the count of Foix who must pay him homage, in exchange for his neutrality in the succession problems of the Count of Urgel. This sovereignty then passed to the kings of Navarre, through the marriage of Gaston IV, Count of Foix, with Eléonore, heiress to the kingdom of Navarre, which was subsequently united with the kingdom of France by Henry IV, together with the lands of the houses of Foix and Albret.

In June 1944, a maquis resistance was formed in the Quérigut region by Marcel Taillandier, leader of the Secret army in Toulouse. Donezan will also be a fallback place for the Picaussel maquis after its attack in August 1944. Finally, numerous passages will be made to Spain from Quérigut.

== Population ==
Inhabitants are called Quérigutois in French.

Historical population
Year	Pop.	±% p.a.
1968	234	—
1975	171	−4.38%
1982	153	−1.58%
1990	142	−0.93%
1999	116	−2.22%
2007	136	+2.01%
2012	142	+0.87%
2017	133	−1.30%
2023	139	+0.74%
Source: INSEE

== See also ==
- Communes of the Ariège department
