= Unac, Ariège =

Commune in Occitanie, France

Unac
- Commune
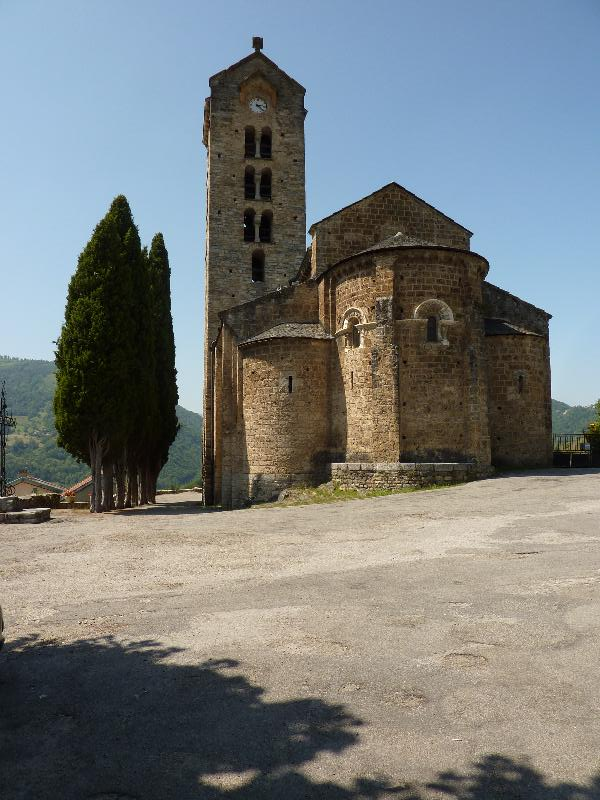
- The church in Unac
- Location of Unac
- Location within France Location within Occitanie
- Coordinates: 42°45′43″N 1°46′33″E
- Country: France
- Region: Occitania
- Department: Ariège
- Arrondissement: Foix
- Canton: Haute-Ariège

Government
  - Mayor (2020–2026): Christophe Langlade
- Area^{1}: 2.65 km^{2} (1.02 sq mi)
- Elevation: 640 m (2,100 ft)
- Highest elevation: 1,160 m (3,810 ft)
- Lowest elevation: 598 m (1,962 ft)
- Population (2023): 127
  - Density: 47.9/km^{2} (124/sq mi)
- Time zone: UTC+01:00 (CET)
  - Summer (DST): UTC+02:00 (CEST)
- INSEE/Postal code: 09318 /09250
- ^{1} French Land Register data, which excludes lakes, ponds, glaciers > 1 km^{2} (0.386 sq mi or 247 acres) and river estuaries.

Unac (French pronunciation: [ynak]) is a commune in the Ariège department in southwestern France.

== Population ==
Historical population
Year	Pop.	±% p.a.
1968	146	—
1975	137	−0.90%
1982	121	−1.76%
1990	118	−0.31%
1999	117	−0.09%
2007	123	+0.63%
2012	116	−1.17%
2017	120	+0.68%
2023	127	+0.95%
Source: INSEE

== See also ==
- Communes of the Ariège department
