= Larnat =

Commune in Occitanie, France

- Commune
- Location of Larnat
- Location within France Location within Occitanie
- Coordinates: 42°48′01″N 1°37′58″E
- Country: France
- Region: Occitania
- Department: Ariège
- Arrondissement: Foix
- Canton: Haute-Ariège

Government
  - Mayor (2020–2026): Claude Gouzy
- Area^{1}: 5.6 km^{2} (2.2 sq mi)
- Elevation: 940 m (3,080 ft)
- Highest elevation: 1,544 m (5,066 ft)
- Lowest elevation: 639 m (2,096 ft)
- Population (2023): 19
  - Density: 3.4/km^{2} (8.8/sq mi)
- Time zone: UTC+01:00 (CET)
  - Summer (DST): UTC+02:00 (CEST)
- INSEE/Postal code: 09156 /09310
- ^{1} French Land Register data, which excludes lakes, ponds, glaciers > 1 km^{2} (0.386 sq mi or 247 acres) and river estuaries.

Larnat (French pronunciation: [laʁna]) is a commune in the Ariège department in southwestern France.

== Population ==
Historical population
Year	Pop.	±% p.a.
1968	45	—
1975	29	−6.08%
1982	25	−2.10%
1990	15	−6.19%
1999	16	+0.72%
2007	18	+1.48%
2012	21	+3.13%
2017	21	+0.00%
2023	19	−1.65%
Source: INSEE

== See also ==
- Communes of the Ariège department
