= Ussat =

Commune in Occitanie, France

- Commune
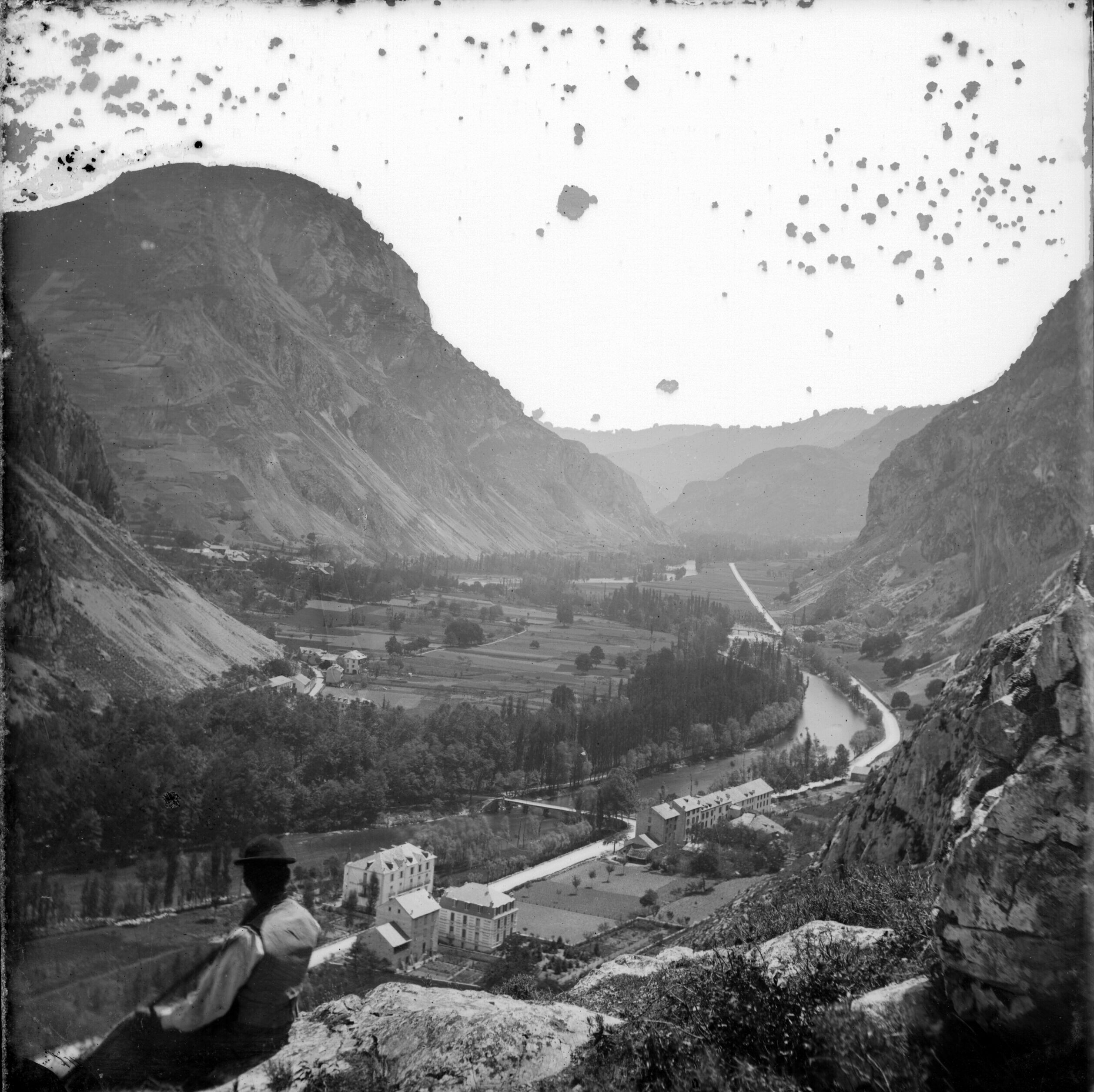
- Ussat in the 19th century
- Location of Ussat
- Location within France Location within Occitanie
- Coordinates: 42°49′55″N 1°37′16″E
- Country: France
- Region: Occitania
- Department: Ariège
- Arrondissement: Foix
- Canton: Haute-Ariège
- Intercommunality: Pays de Tarascon

Government
  - Mayor (2020–2026): Bernard Dunglas
- Area^{1}: 4.4 km^{2} (1.7 sq mi)
- Elevation: 500 m (1,600 ft)
- Highest elevation: 1,187 m (3,894 ft)
- Lowest elevation: 467 m (1,532 ft)
- Population (2023): 307
  - Density: 70/km^{2} (180/sq mi)
- Time zone: UTC+01:00 (CET)
  - Summer (DST): UTC+02:00 (CEST)
- INSEE/Postal code: 09321 /09400
- ^{1} French Land Register data, which excludes lakes, ponds, glaciers > 1 km^{2} (0.386 sq mi or 247 acres) and river estuaries.

Ussat is a commune in the Ariège department in southwestern France.

== Population ==
Inhabitants of Ussat are called Ussatois in French.

Historical population
| Year | Pop. | ±% p.a. |
|---|---|---|
| 1968 | 231 | — |
| 1975 | 268 | +2.15% |
| 1982 | 281 | +0.68% |
| 1990 | 317 | +1.52% |
| 1999 | 372 | +1.79% |
| 2007 | 324 | −1.71% |
| 2012 | 345 | +1.26% |
| 2017 | 322 | −1.37% |
| 2023 | 307 | −0.79% |
Source: INSEE

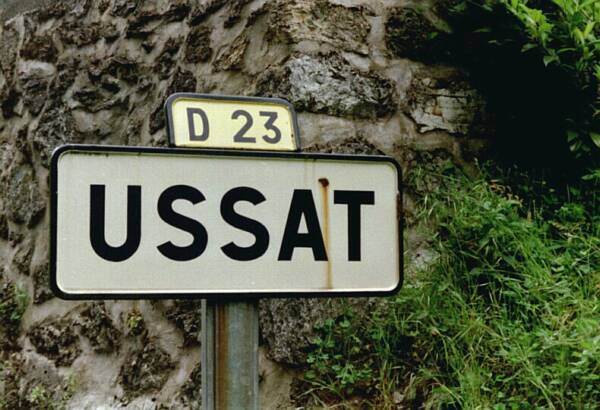
town sign of Ussat

== See also ==
- Communes of the Ariège department
