= Carcanières =

Commune in Occitanie, France

- Commune
- Location of Carcanières
- Location within France Location within Occitanie
- Coordinates: 42°42′55″N 2°06′32″E
- Country: France
- Region: Occitania
- Department: Ariège
- Arrondissement: Foix
- Canton: Haute-Ariège

Government
  - Mayor (2020–2026): Jacques Cayrol
- Area^{1}: 6.5 km^{2} (2.5 sq mi)
- Elevation: 1,176 m (3,858 ft)
- Highest elevation: 1,391 m (4,564 ft)
- Lowest elevation: 895 m (2,936 ft)
- Population (2023): 70
  - Density: 11/km^{2} (28/sq mi)
- Time zone: UTC+01:00 (CET)
  - Summer (DST): UTC+02:00 (CEST)
- INSEE/Postal code: 09078 /09460
- ^{1} French Land Register data, which excludes lakes, ponds, glaciers > 1 km^{2} (0.386 sq mi or 247 acres) and river estuaries.

Carcanières (French pronunciation: [kaʁkanjɛʁ]; Occitan: Carcanièra) is a commune in the Ariège department in southwestern France.

== Population ==
Historical population
| Year | Pop. | ±% p.a. |
|---|---|---|
| 1968 | 60 | — |
| 1975 | 45 | −4.03% |
| 1982 | 41 | −1.32% |
| 1990 | 48 | +1.99% |
| 1999 | 46 | −0.47% |
| 2007 | 53 | +1.79% |
| 2012 | 82 | +9.12% |
| 2017 | 76 | −1.51% |
| 2023 | 70 | −1.36% |
Source: INSEE

== See also ==
- Communes of the Ariège department
