= Garanou =

Commune in Occitanie, France

- Commune
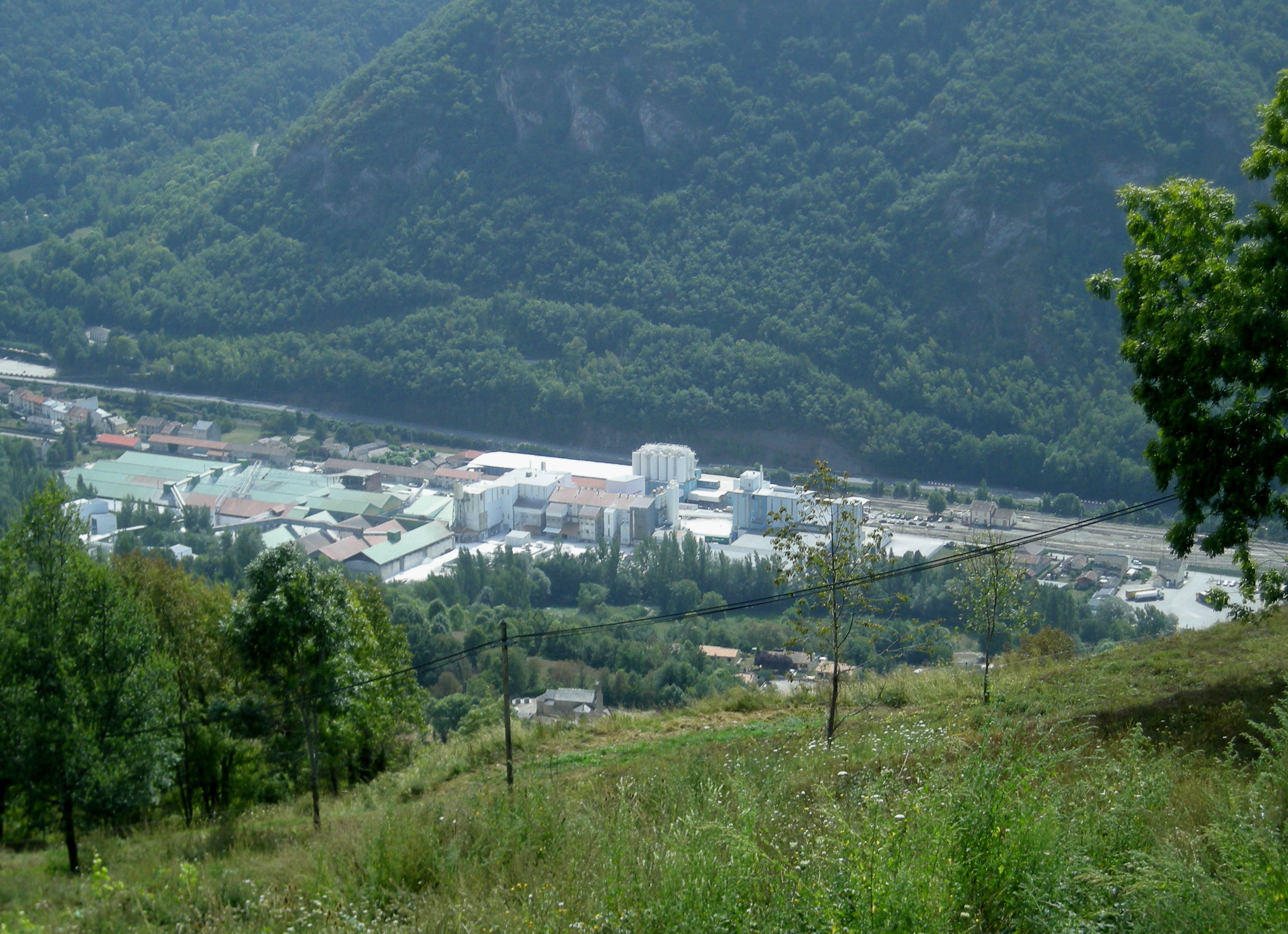
- Industrial district

- Coat of arms
- Location of Garanou
- Location within France Location within Occitanie
- Coordinates: 42°46′02″N 1°45′08″E
- Country: France
- Region: Occitania
- Department: Ariège
- Arrondissement: Foix
- Canton: Haute-Ariège

Government
  - Mayor (2020–2026): Thierry Olivié
- Area^{1}: 3.01 km^{2} (1.16 sq mi)
- Elevation: 584 m (1,916 ft)
- Highest elevation: 1,409 m (4,623 ft)
- Lowest elevation: 575 m (1,886 ft)
- Population (2023): 143
  - Density: 47.5/km^{2} (123/sq mi)
- Time zone: UTC+01:00 (CET)
  - Summer (DST): UTC+02:00 (CEST)
- INSEE/Postal code: 09131 /09250
- ^{1} French Land Register data, which excludes lakes, ponds, glaciers > 1 km^{2} (0.386 sq mi or 247 acres) and river estuaries.

Garanou (French pronunciation: [ɡaʁanu]; Occitan: Garanon) is a commune in the Ariège department in southwestern France.

== Population ==
Historical population
Year	Pop.	±% p.a.
1968	262	—
1975	227	−2.03%
1982	246	+1.15%
1990	192	−3.05%
1999	188	−0.23%
2007	162	−1.84%
2012	170	+0.97%
2017	159	−1.33%
2023	143	−1.75%
Source: INSEE

== See also ==
- Communes of the Ariège department
