= Urs, Ariège =

Commune in Occitanie, France

Urs
- Commune
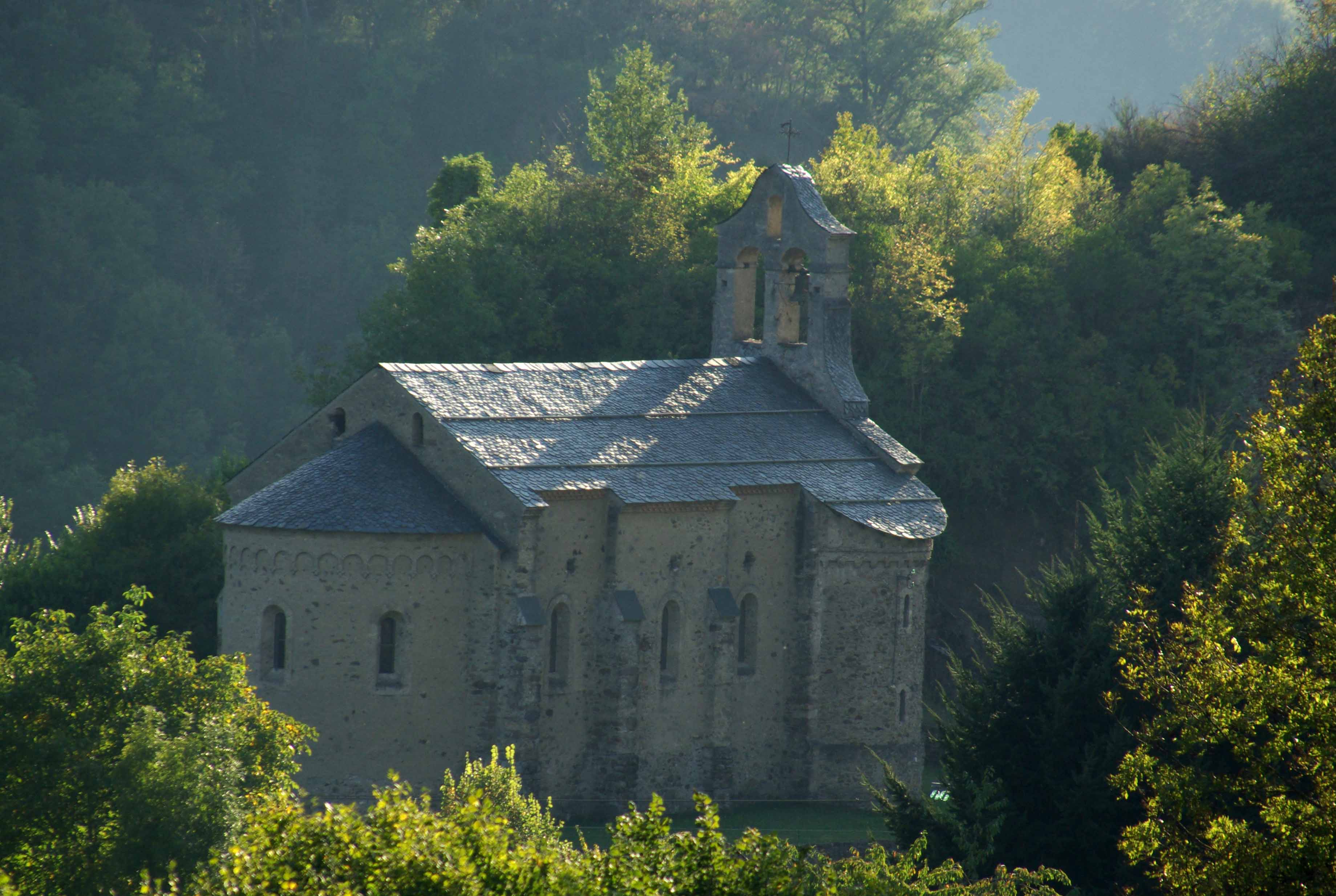
- The church in Urs
- Location of Urs
- Location within France Location within Occitanie
- Coordinates: 42°46′32″N 1°44′02″E
- Country: France
- Region: Occitania
- Department: Ariège
- Arrondissement: Foix
- Canton: Haute-Ariège

Government
  - Mayor (2020–2026): Jean Lopes-Pinto
- Area^{1}: 0.9 km^{2} (0.35 sq mi)
- Elevation: 588 m (1,929 ft)
- Highest elevation: 1,160 m (3,810 ft)
- Lowest elevation: 567 m (1,860 ft)
- Population (2023): 27
  - Density: 30/km^{2} (78/sq mi)
- Time zone: UTC+01:00 (CET)
  - Summer (DST): UTC+02:00 (CEST)
- INSEE/Postal code: 09320 /09310
- ^{1} French Land Register data, which excludes lakes, ponds, glaciers > 1 km^{2} (0.386 sq mi or 247 acres) and river estuaries.

Urs is a commune in the Ariège department in southern France.

== Population ==
Historical population
| Year | Pop. | ±% p.a. |
|---|---|---|
| 1968 | 39 | — |
| 1975 | 36 | −1.14% |
| 1982 | 33 | −1.24% |
| 1990 | 30 | −1.18% |
| 1999 | 24 | −2.45% |
| 2007 | 40 | +6.59% |
| 2012 | 39 | −0.51% |
| 2017 | 33 | −3.29% |
| 2023 | 27 | −3.29% |
Source: INSEE

== See also ==
- Communes of the Ariège department
