= Albiès =

Commune in Occitanie, France

- Commune
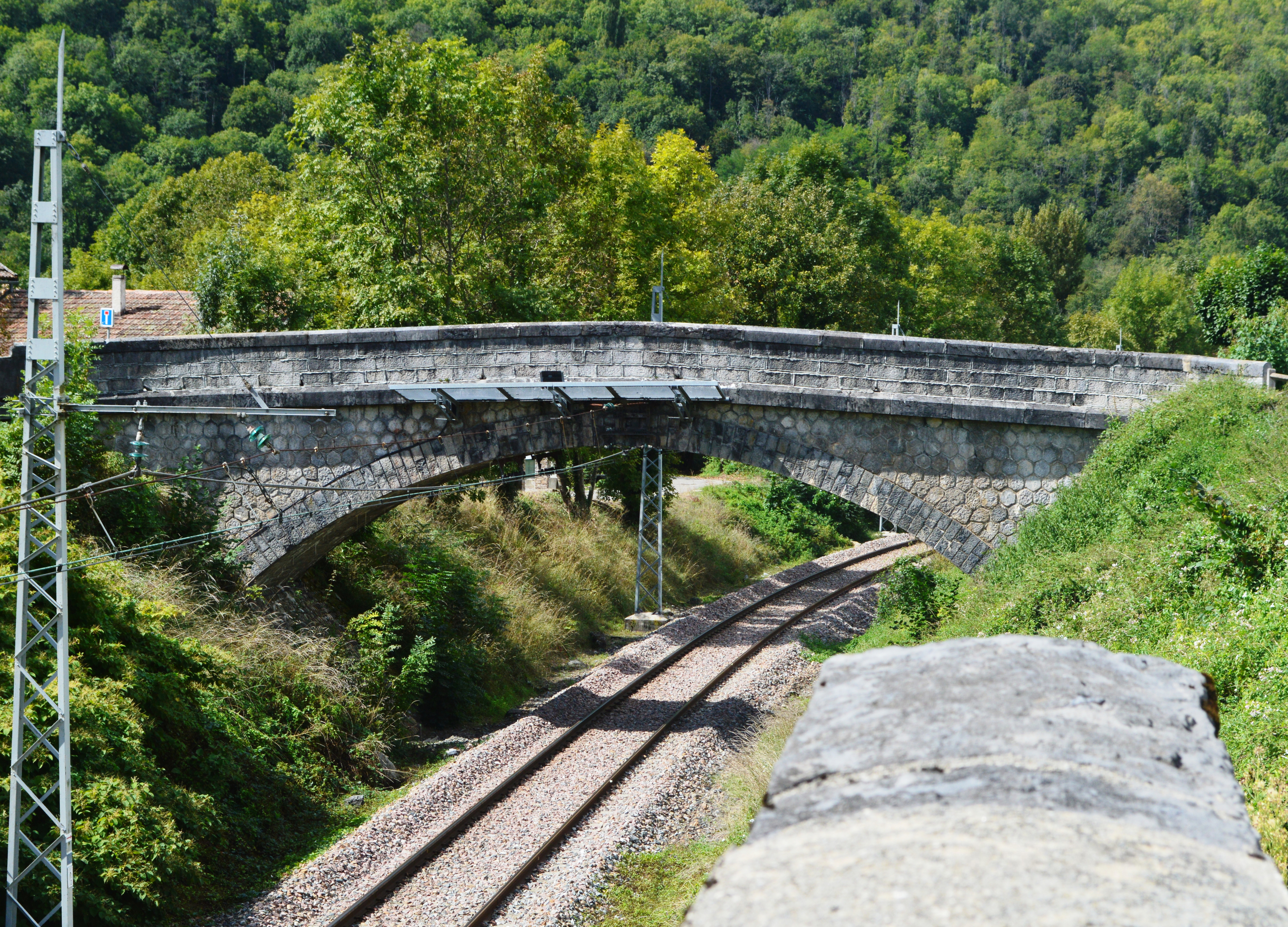
- Albiès railway bridge
- Location of Albiès
- Location within France Location within Occitanie
- Coordinates: 42°46′42″N 1°42′10″E
- Country: France
- Region: Occitania
- Department: Ariège
- Arrondissement: Foix
- Canton: Haute-Ariège
- Intercommunality: Haute-Ariège

Government
  - Mayor (2020–2026): Bholème Boufaid
- Area^{1}: 7.69 km^{2} (2.97 sq mi)
- Elevation: 560 m (1,840 ft)
- Highest elevation: 1,887 m (6,191 ft)
- Lowest elevation: 531 m (1,742 ft)
- Population (2023): 123
  - Density: 16.0/km^{2} (41.4/sq mi)
- Time zone: UTC+01:00 (CET)
  - Summer (DST): UTC+02:00 (CEST)
- INSEE/Postal code: 09004 /09310
- ^{1} French Land Register data, which excludes lakes, ponds, glaciers > 1 km^{2} (0.386 sq mi or 247 acres) and river estuaries.

Albiès (French pronunciation: [albjɛs]; Occitan: Alvièrs) is a commune in the Ariège department in the Occitanie region of southwestern France.

== Geography ==
Albiès is a long narrow commune oriented north–south about 25 km south by south-east of Foix and 15 km west by north-west of Ax-les-Thermes. It is traversed by Route Nationale N20 (E9) from Verdun in the north-west passing south of the village and continuing to the east. It is also possible to access the southern tip of the commune by road D522 from Les Cabannes to the west of the village via a tortuous mountain route west of the commune arriving at the southern tip of the commune where it terminates. The commune south of the N20 highway is heavily forested and inaccessible mountainous terrain. The village can be accessed by the Rue de Nappy going north from the N20 highway. A railway line passes through the village from west to east but there is no station in the commune. The nearest station is at Les Cabannes some 4 km to the west.

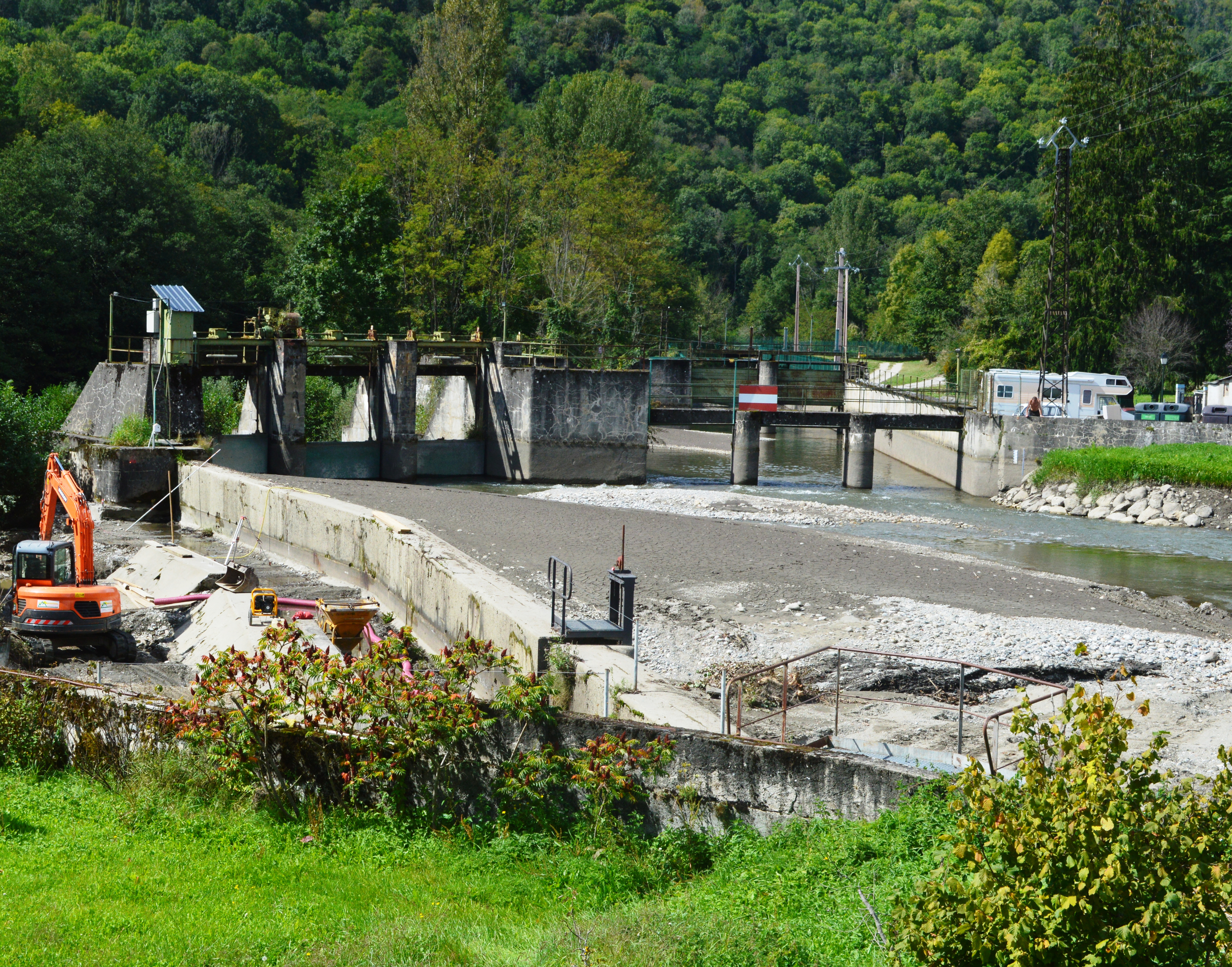
Albiès Floodgates on the Ariège river

The Ariège river passes through the village flowing east parallel to the N20. The Ruisseau de Caychax flows from the north of the commune into the Ariège. The Ruisseau de Sauzelles rises in the south of the commune and flows north joining the Ruisseau de l'Oule which rises in the south-west and forms the southern portion of the western border before joining the Ruisseau de Sauzelles and becoming the Ruisseau de Lavel d'Albiès which is most of the western border before joining the Ravin de la Rescalbade and flowing into the Ariège as the Ruisseau de la Garganle. A separate stream - the Ruisseau de Garganle - forms part of the eastern border where it flows into the Ariège.

== Administration ==
List of Successive Mayors

From	To	Name	Party
2001	2020	Jean-Claude Prat	PCF
2020	2026	Bholème Boufaid	

== Population ==
The inhabitants of the commune are known as Albiésois or Albiésoises in French.

Historical population
Year	Pop.	±% p.a.
1968	146	—
1975	163	+1.59%
1982	144	−1.75%
1990	141	−0.26%
1999	156	+1.13%
2007	139	−1.43%
2012	131	−1.18%
2017	123	−1.25%
2023	123	+0.00%
Source: INSEE

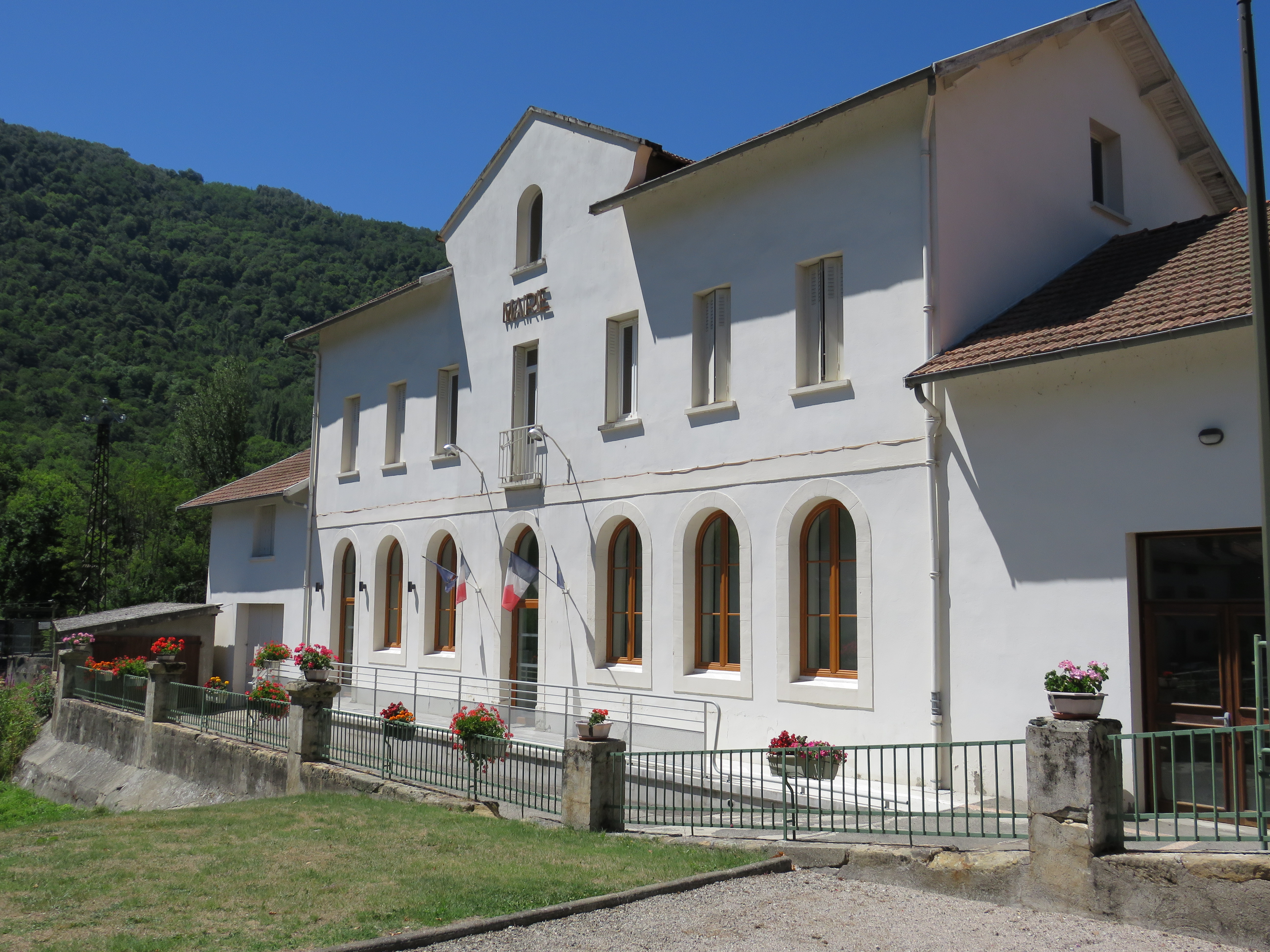
Albiès Town Hall

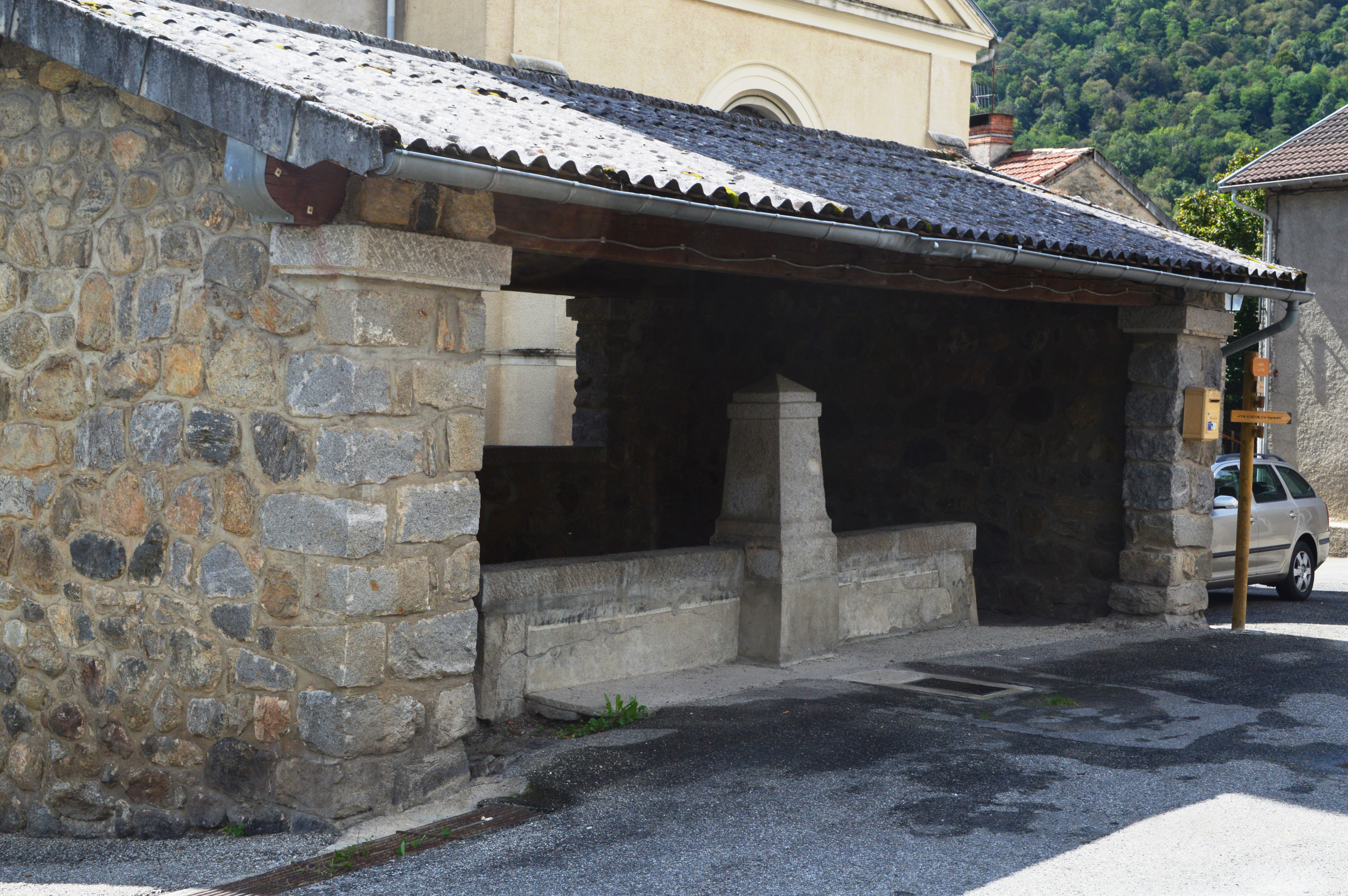
The Lavoir (Public Laundry)

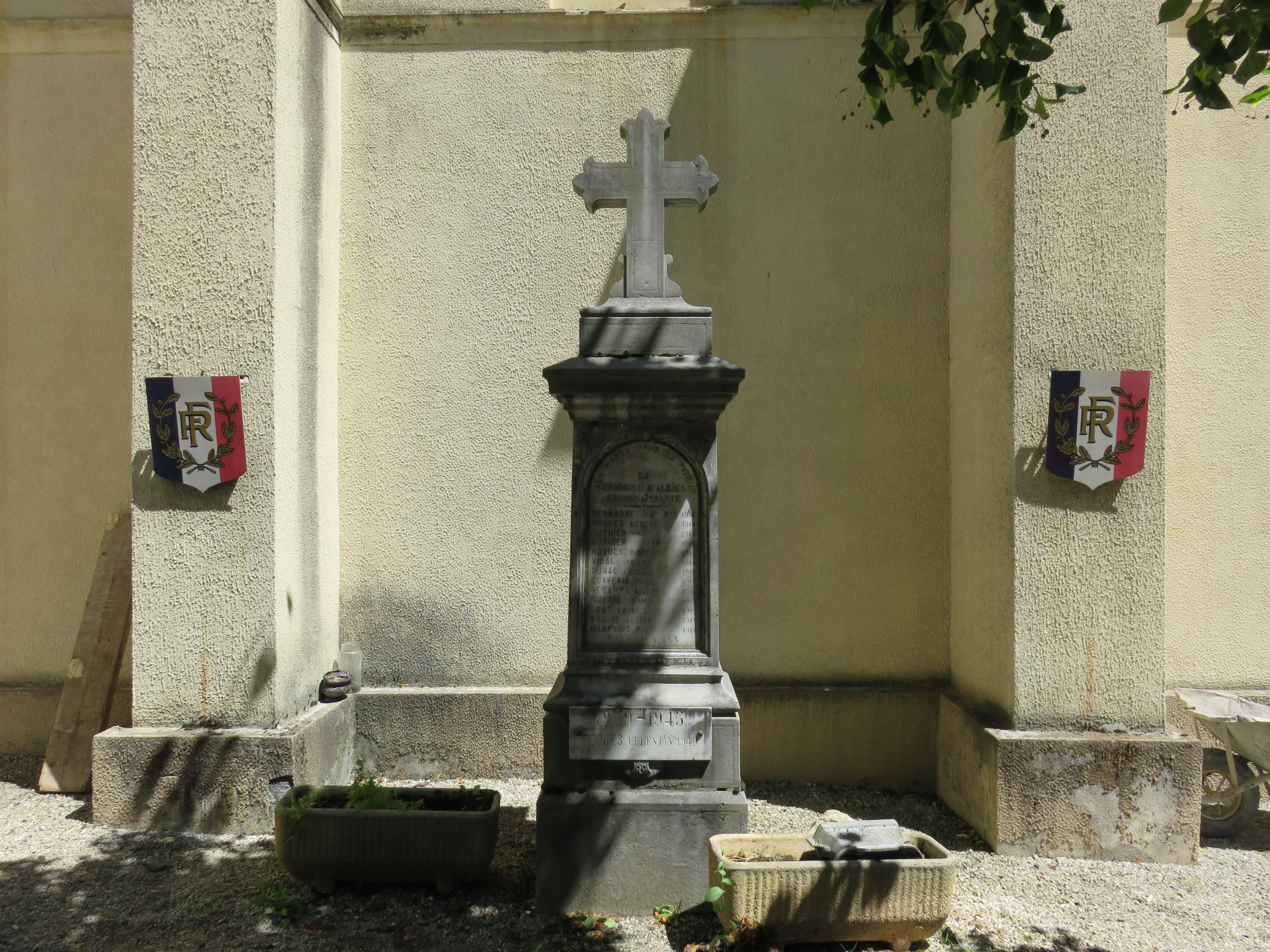
Albiès War Memorial

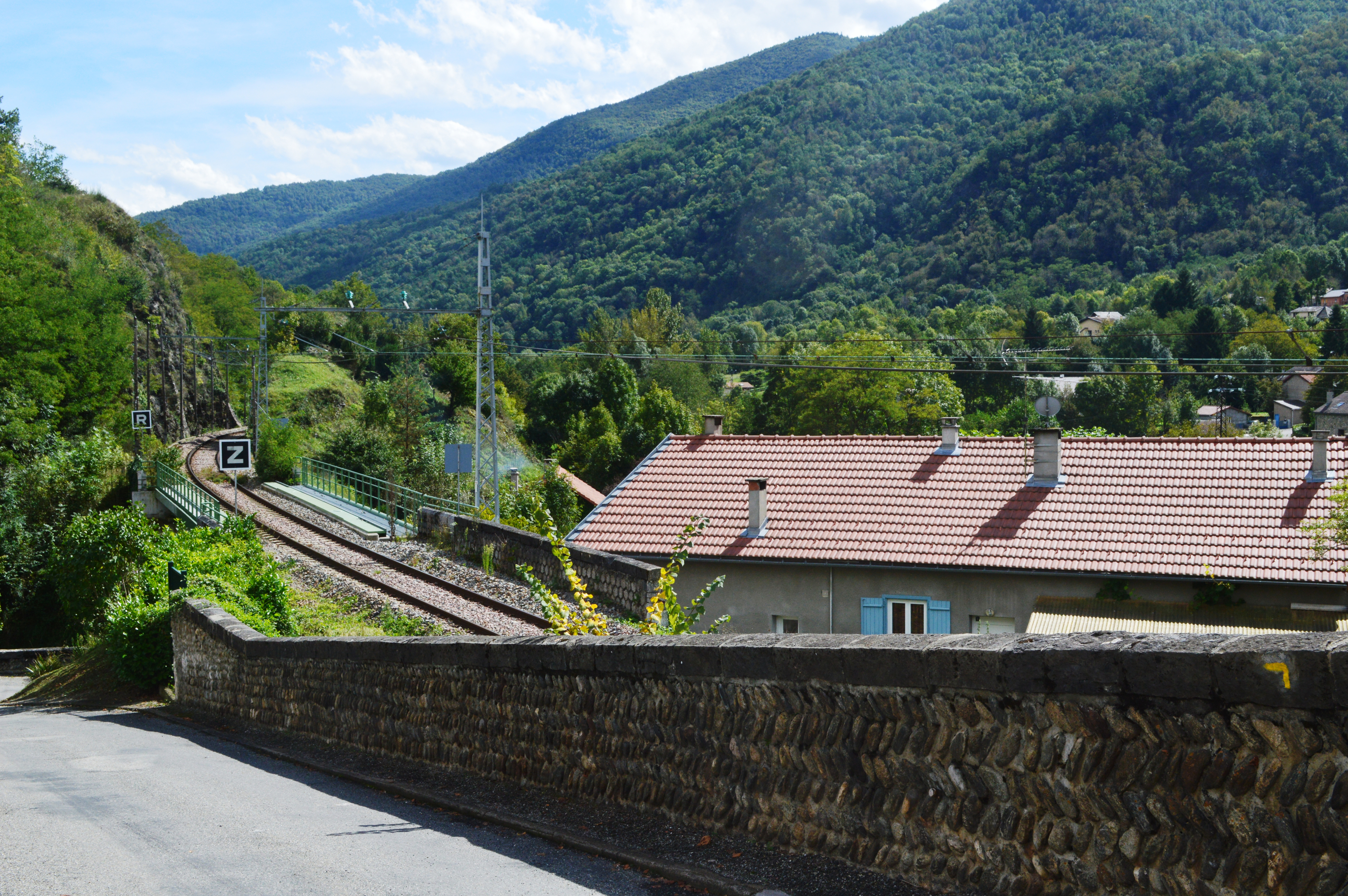
The railway passing through the village

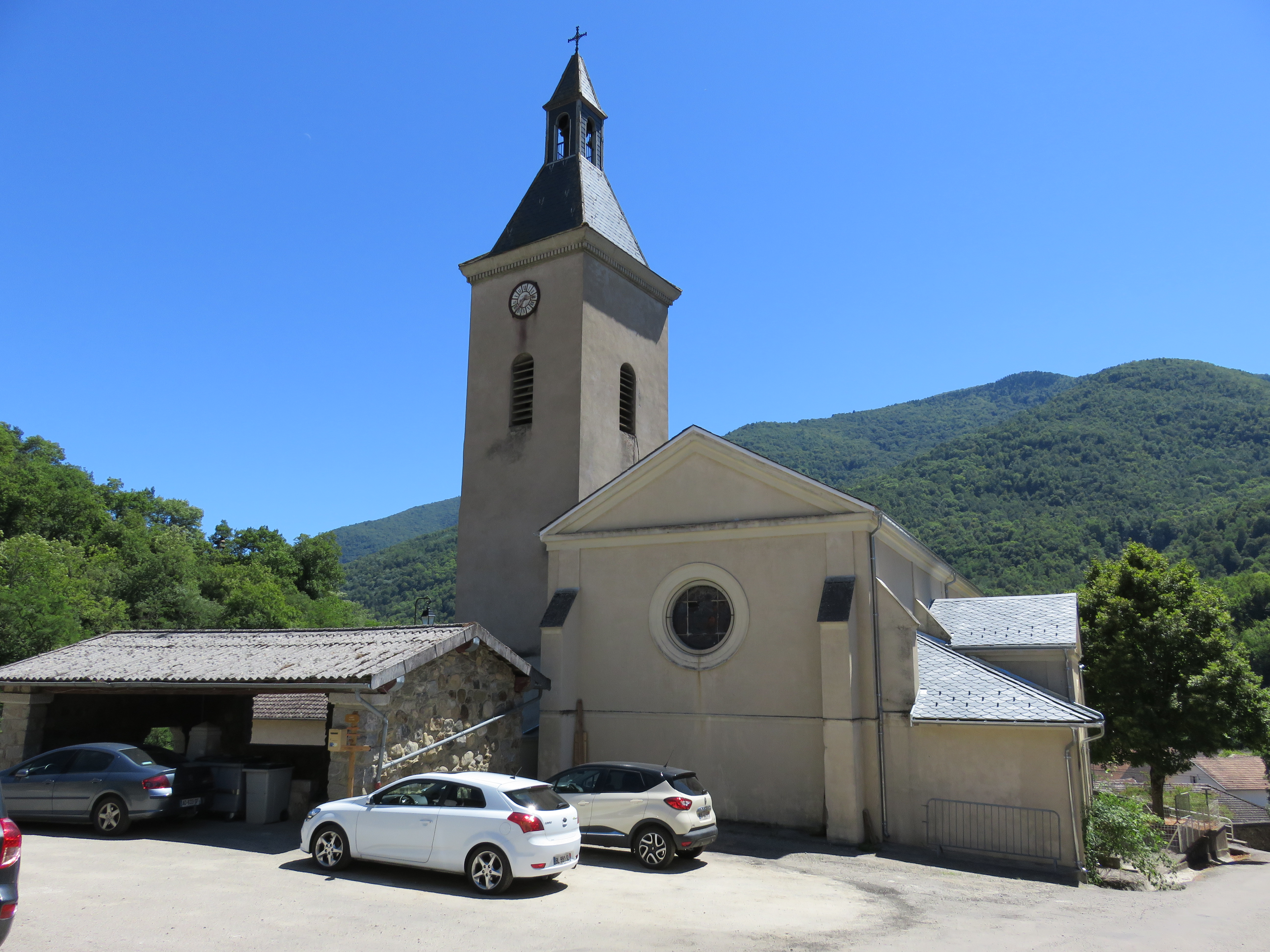
Albiès Church

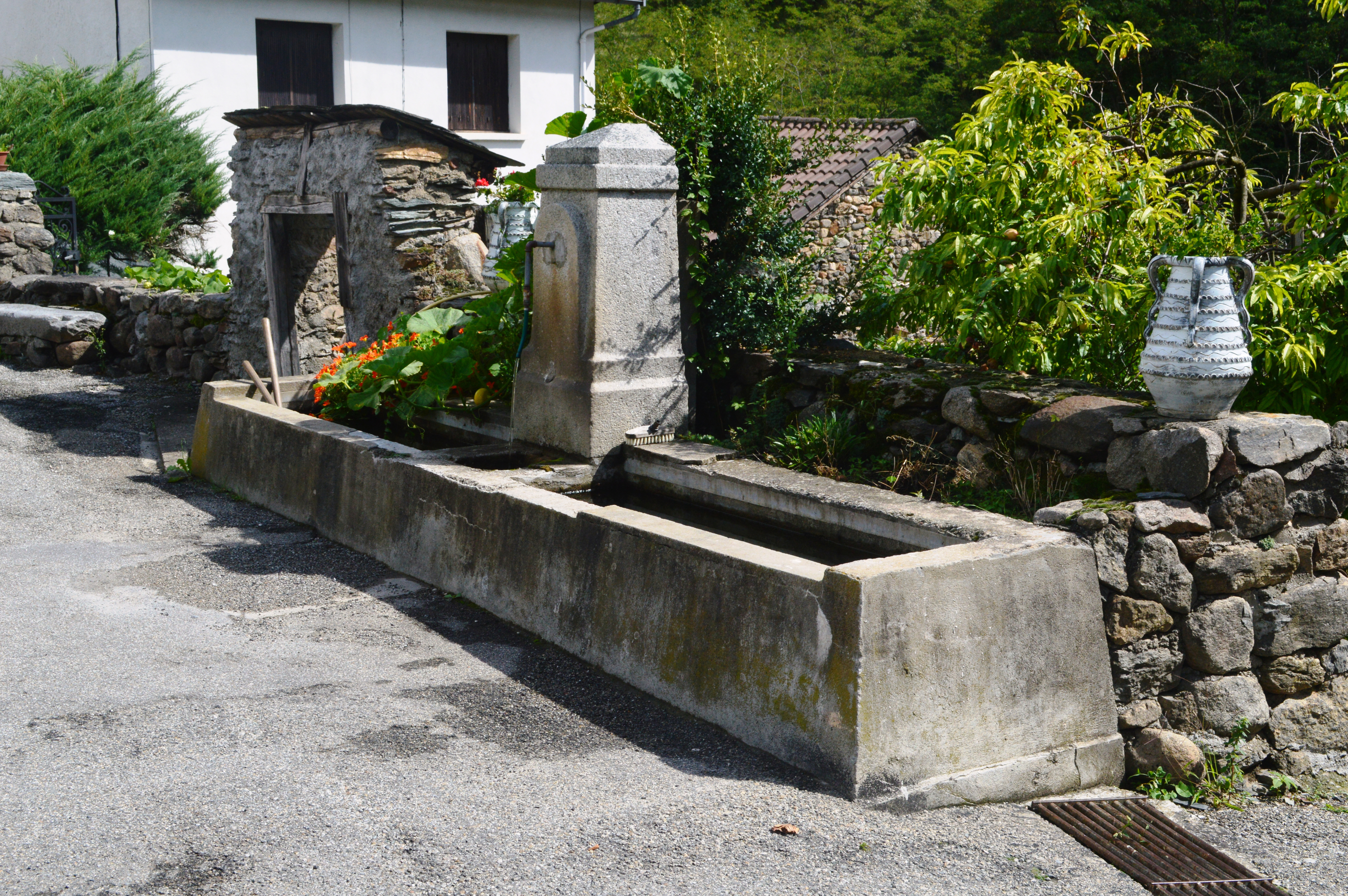
Albiès Drinking Trough

== Religious heritage ==
The Parish Church contains a collection plate (17th century) which is registered as an historical object.

== Notable people linked to the commune ==
- Monseigneur Jean-Marie Vidal (1872–1940), Bishop of Pamiers, historian and writer
- Jacques Martiel (born 13 December 1946), journalist, publisher and printer

== See also ==
- Communes of the Ariège department
