= Baulou =

Commune in Occitanie, France

- Commune
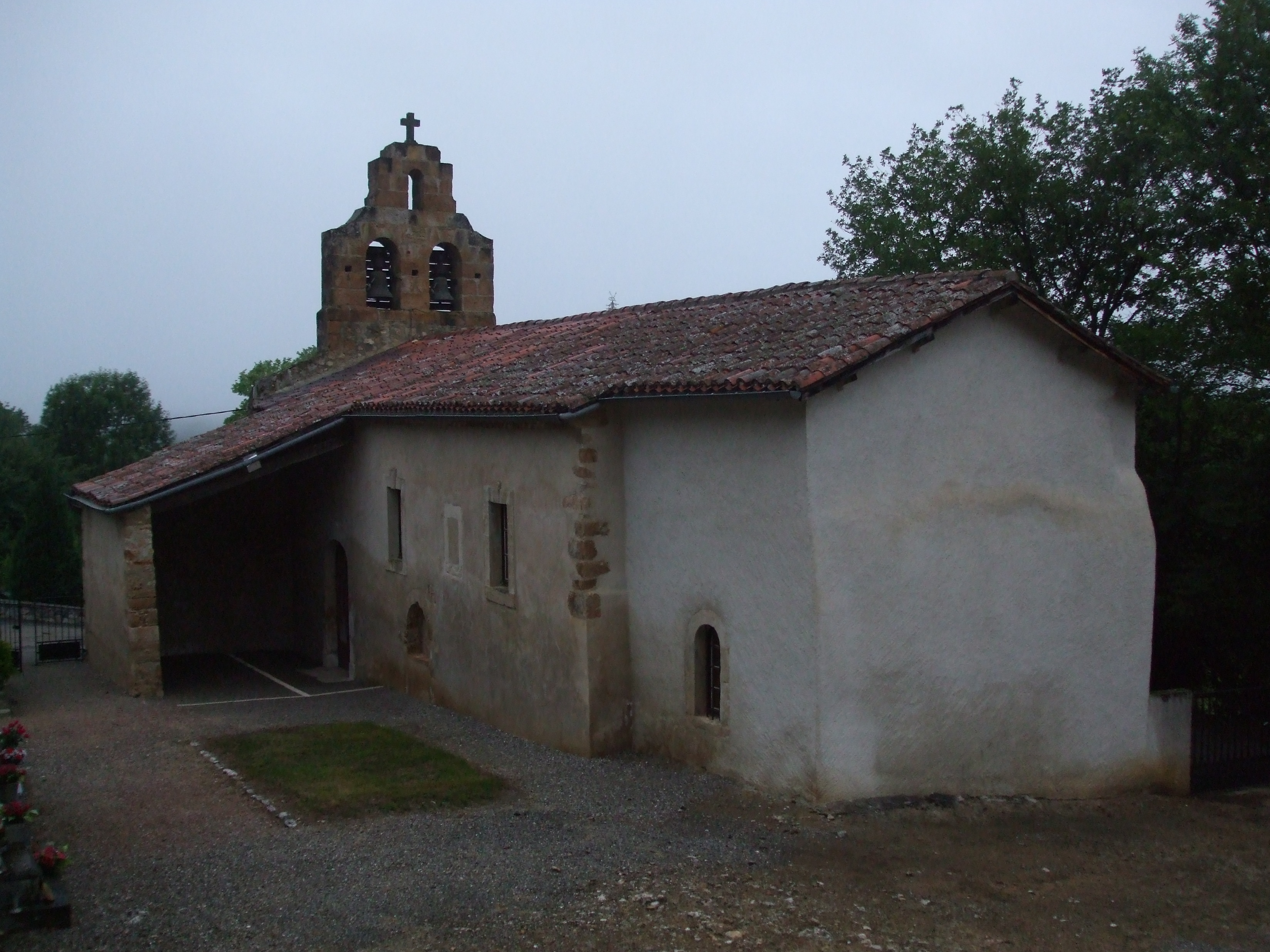
- The church in Baulou
- Location of Baulou
- Location within France Location within Occitanie
- Coordinates: 43°01′01″N 1°32′03″E
- Country: France
- Region: Occitania
- Department: Ariège
- Arrondissement: Foix
- Canton: Val d'Ariège
- Intercommunality: CA Pays Foix-Varilhes

Government
  - Mayor (2020–2026): Nathalie Esquinol
- Area^{1}: 14.62 km^{2} (5.64 sq mi)
- Elevation: 490 m (1,610 ft)
- Highest elevation: 655 m (2,149 ft)
- Lowest elevation: 393 m (1,289 ft)
- Population (2023): 164
  - Density: 11.2/km^{2} (29.1/sq mi)
- Time zone: UTC+01:00 (CET)
  - Summer (DST): UTC+02:00 (CEST)
- INSEE/Postal code: 09044 /09000
- ^{1} French Land Register data, which excludes lakes, ponds, glaciers > 1 km^{2} (0.386 sq mi or 247 acres) and river estuaries.

Baulou (French pronunciation: [bolu]; Occitan: Baulon) is a commune in the Ariège department in the Occitanie region of south-western France.

== Geography ==
Baulou is located in the Pre-Pyrenees in the Plauntaurel Mountains and a part of the Parc naturel régional des Pyrénées ariégeoises some 12 km south by south-west of Pamiers and 6 km north-west of Foix. Access to the commune is by the D1 road from Vernajoul in the south-east which passes through the commune and ends in the village. The D11 branches from the D117 south-west of the commune and passes through continuing north-east to Loubens. The D1a branches off the D11 in the commune and goes north-west to Aigues-Juntes. Apart from the village there is the hamlet of Clarac in the commune. The commune is mainly forest with some farmland along the D1 and in scattered parts.

The Ruisseau d'Argentat rises north of the village and flows towards the north-west into a small artificial lake before continuing north-west to join the Lèze north-west of Aigues-Juntes. Many streams feed the left bank of the Ruisseau d'Argentat including the Goute de Chenaut which also forms the north-western border of the commune, the Freyché, the Goute de Tariol, the Goute du Peyfourcat, and the Goute du Gouas. The Ruisseau de Carol flows from the south to the village then continues north to join the Ruisseau de la Plaine north of the commune. The Fajal rises in the north-east of the commune and flows south.

== Toponymy ==
Baulou appears as Boulou on the 1750 Cassini Map and the same on the 1790 version.

== History ==
In 1901, during the building of the Foix - Saint Girons railway a mammoth was discovered and called the "Mammoth of Baulou" by the scientific community. It was displayed in the hall of the Château de Foix departmental museum before being transferred to the Parc pyrénéen de l'art préhistorique (Pyrenean park of prehistoric art) at Tarascon-sur-Ariège.

== Administration ==
List of Successive Mayors

| From | To | Name |
|---|---|---|
| 2001 | 2014 | Robert Baures |
| 2014 | 2026 | Nathalie Esquinol |

== Demography ==
The inhabitants of the commune are known as Baulouais or Baulouaises in French.

Historical population

| Year | Pop. | ±% p.a. |
|---|---|---|
| 1793 | 350 | — |
| 1821 | 360 | +0.10% |
| 1846 | 491 | +1.25% |
| 1872 | 482 | −0.07% |
| 1901 | 458 | −0.18% |
| 1921 | 236 | −3.26% |
| 1946 | 216 | −0.35% |
| 1954 | 210 | −0.35% |
| 1962 | 157 | −3.57% |

| Year | Pop. | ±% p.a. |
|---|---|---|
| 1968 | 144 | −1.43% |
| 1975 | 123 | −2.23% |
| 1982 | 114 | −1.08% |
| 1990 | 130 | +1.66% |
| 1999 | 146 | +1.30% |
| 2007 | 162 | +1.31% |
| 2012 | 164 | +0.25% |
| 2017 | 168 | +0.48% |
| 2023 | 164 | −0.40% |

Source: EHESS and INSEE

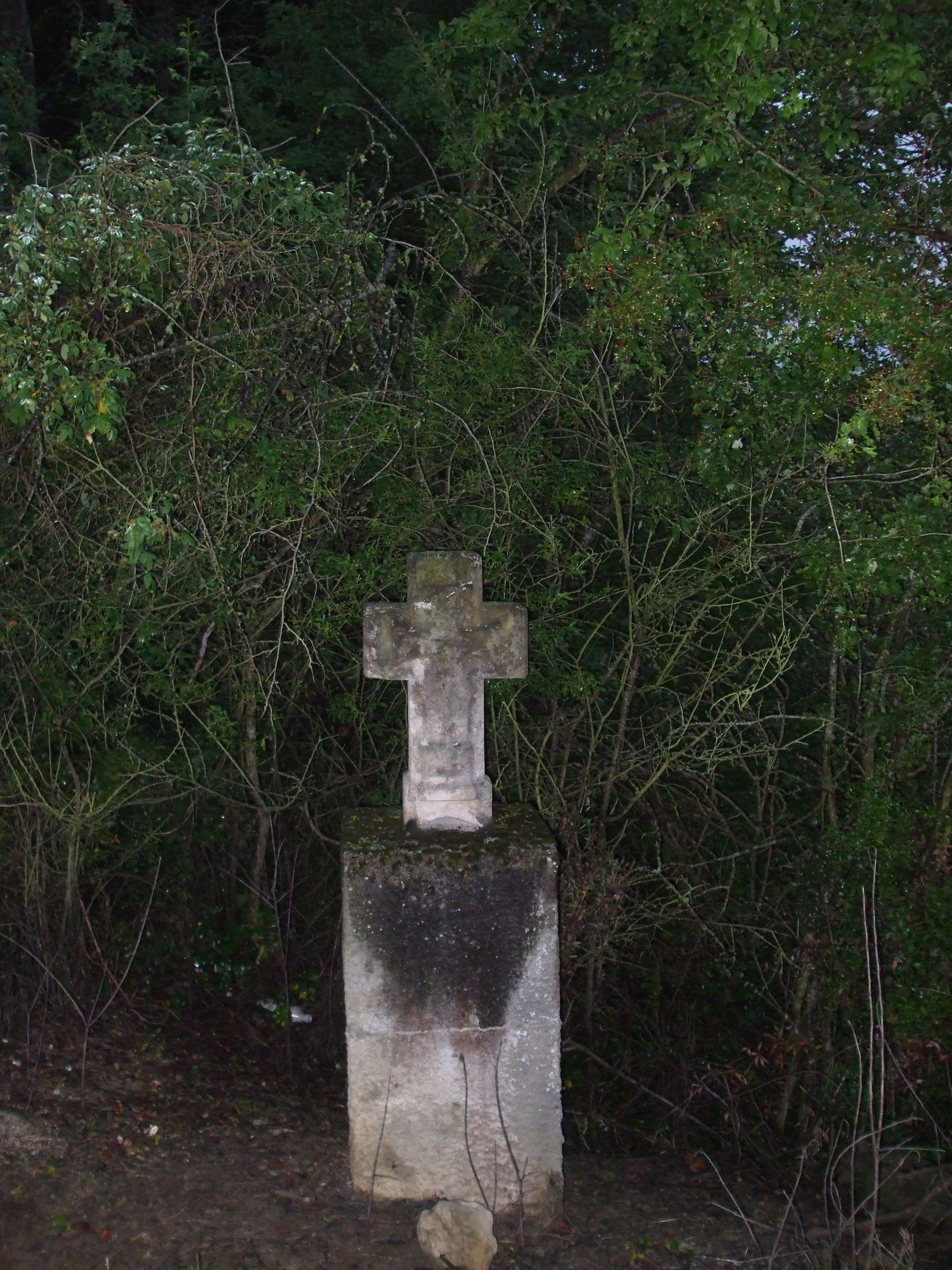
A Stone Cross with a five branched star referring to the Egyptian goddess Sothis

== Sites and monuments ==
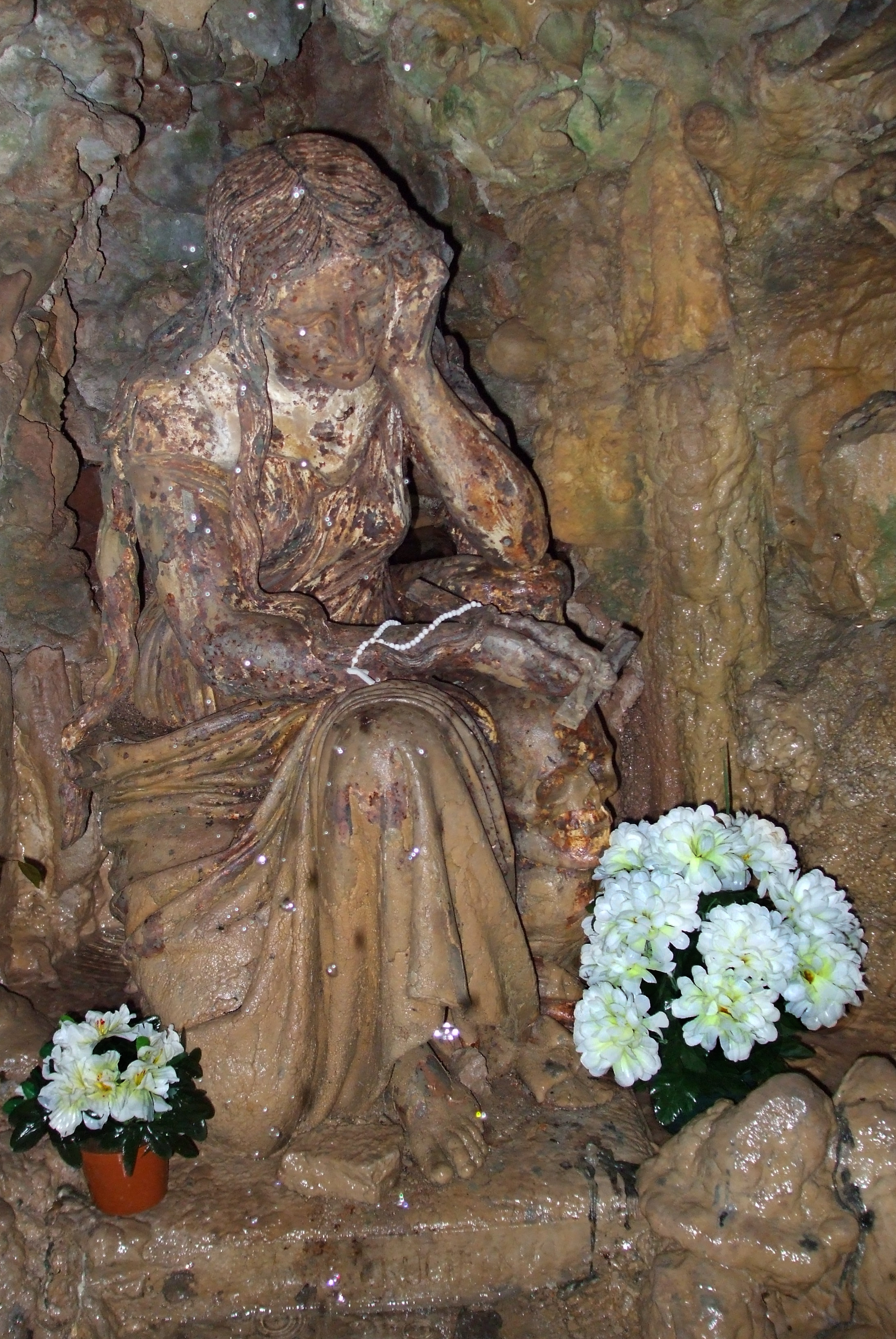
Statue of Madeleine in an artificial cave. Note the skull beneath the crucifix in her hand.

- The Labouiche underground river

== See also ==
- Communes of the Ariège department
