= Le Bosc =

Le Bosc may refer to the following places in France:

- Le Bosc, Ariège, a commune in the department of Ariège
- Le Bosc, Hérault, a commune in the department of Hérault
