= Loubens =

Loubens is the name of several communes in France:

- Loubens, Ariège, in the Ariège department
- Loubens, Gironde, in the Gironde department
