= Dalou =

Dalou may refer to:

- Dalou Mountains, a range of mountains in People's Republic of China
- Dalou, Ariège, a commune in the Ariège department in southwestern France
- Dalou, Yunnan, a Chinese border town in Yunnan Province
- Jules Dalou, a French sculptor
