= Boudales =

Boudales is an alternative name to several wine grape varieties including:

- Canari noir
- Cinsaut
- Grolleau (grape)
