= Delteil =

Delteil is a surname. Notable people with the surname include:

- Desha Delteil (1899–1980), American dancer and artist's model
- Joseph Delteil (1894–1978), French writer and poet
- Joseph Delteil (speleologist) (1909–1979), French speleologist
- Loÿs Delteil (1869–1927), French engraver and lithographer
- Maite Delteil (born 1933), French painter
