= Cot a Queue verte =

Cot a Queue verte is a synonym or alternative name to several wine grape varieties including:

- Canari noir
- Malbec
- Mancin
