= Brassac =

Brassac is the name or part of the name of several communes in France:

- Brassac, Ariège, in the Ariège department
- Brassac, Tarn, in the Tarn department
- Brassac, Tarn-et-Garonne, in the Tarn-et-Garonne department
- Brassac-les-Mines, in the Puy-de-Dôme department
- Castelnau-de-Brassac, in the Tarn department
- Grand-Brassac, in the Dordogne department
