= Labouiche underground river =

Subterranean river in France with evidence of Paleolithic culture

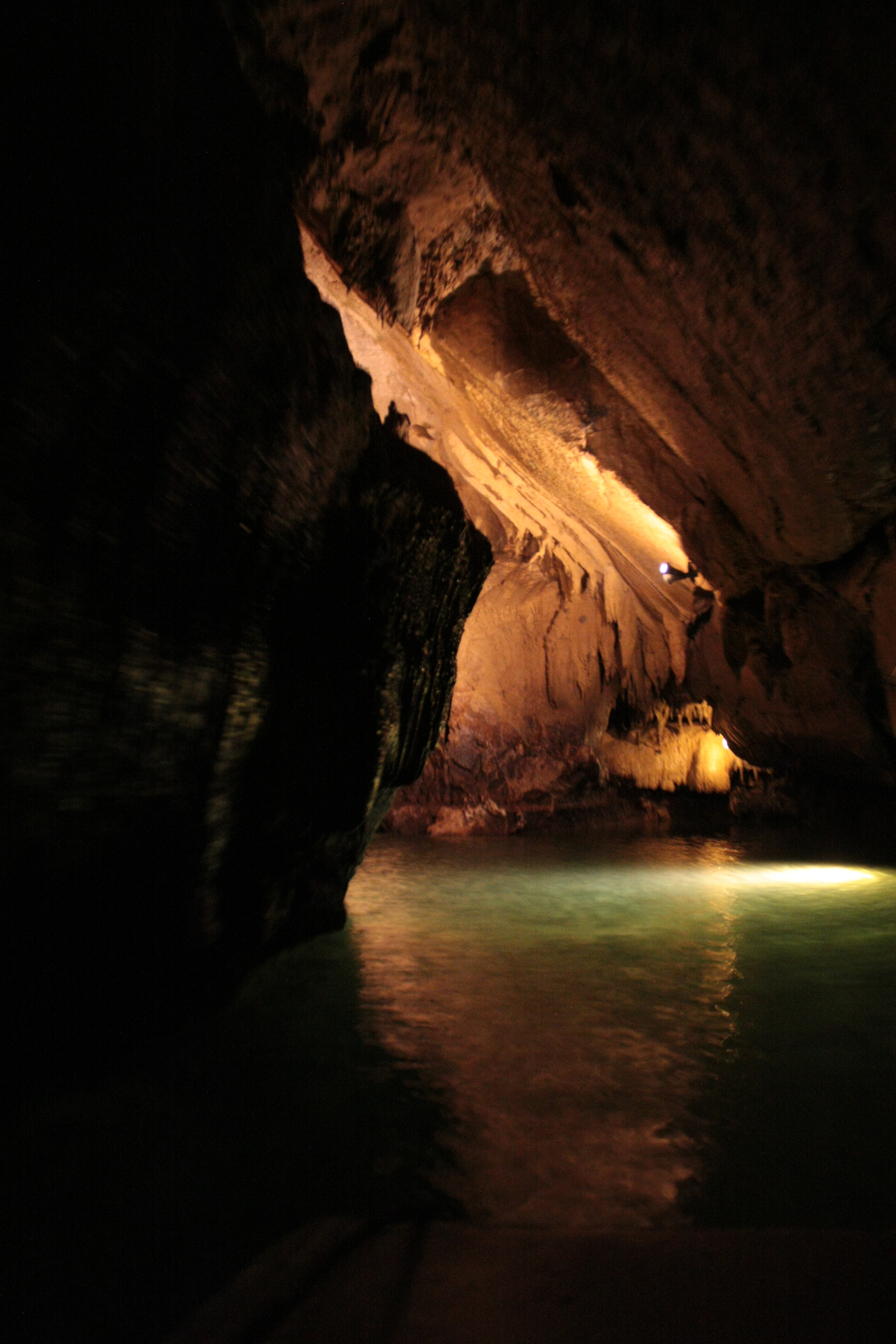
- Native name: Rivière souterraine de Labouiche (French)

Location
- Country: France
- Département: Ariège

Physical characteristics
- Source: Unknown
- Mouth
  - coordinates: 43.003333°N 1.572778°E
- Length: Unknown

The Labouiche underground river (French: Rivière souterraine de Labouiche) forms a long underground cavity concealing a prehistoric site dating back to the Magdalenian period. It is located 6 km northwest of Foix, in Ariège, France. It lies within the municipalities of Vernajoul and Baulou, and within the perimeter of the Ariège Pyrenees Regional Natural Park.

== History ==
In August 1908, Dr. Jules Dunac, who had been living in Foix since 1898, discovered the underground river. Accompanied by his two sons and two young officers, he began the exploration by reaching the first sump located 280 m from the entrance, called the Aïgo Perdent (Occitan for waterway).

Exploration continued between 1909 and 1912, accompanied by Dr. Pierre Crémadells and the speleologist Édouard-Alfred Martel.

In 1935, Paul Salette and Pierre Crémadells, assisted by Norbert Casteret and Joseph Delteil, discovered 3,800 m of active network, but came up against a second, apparently impassable sump. Paul Salette founded a farming company for the tourist exploitation of the cave and its development (electrification, security, construction of a boarding platform, laying of a cable for towing boats, etc.) The underground river was opened to the public in 1938.

During the Second World War, visits to the site were interrupted, but between 1940 and 1943, Louis Méroc and Émilien Soulier carried out archaeological research and unearthed prehistoric and Gallo-Roman remains. In 2015, a dive in the upstream sump did not discover the source of the river.

== Description ==
The cumulative length of the interconnected galleries that make up the underground network is 3,850 m.

A tourist visit of 1.5 km can be made by boat; two transfers are necessary, 60 m underground, in high or low galleries, lit or dark by design. It is the longest navigable underground river in Europe which is open to the public.

== Archaeological remains ==
Prehistoric occupation dating from the recent Magdalenian (Upper Paleolithic) is evident in the upper galleries of the river, with the discovery of tools and weapons made of flint and reindeer antler, as well as portable art (engraved sandstone plaques representing, among other things, a lion, fragments of deer, and a bison modelled in clay). Representations of lions are rare in parietal art: only 150 are known, including 120 in France. Three-quarters of this total come from the Chauvet (75), Roucadour (22) and Lascaux (11) caves.

Remains from the Gallo-Roman period have also been found.

== Gallery ==
Labouiche underground river

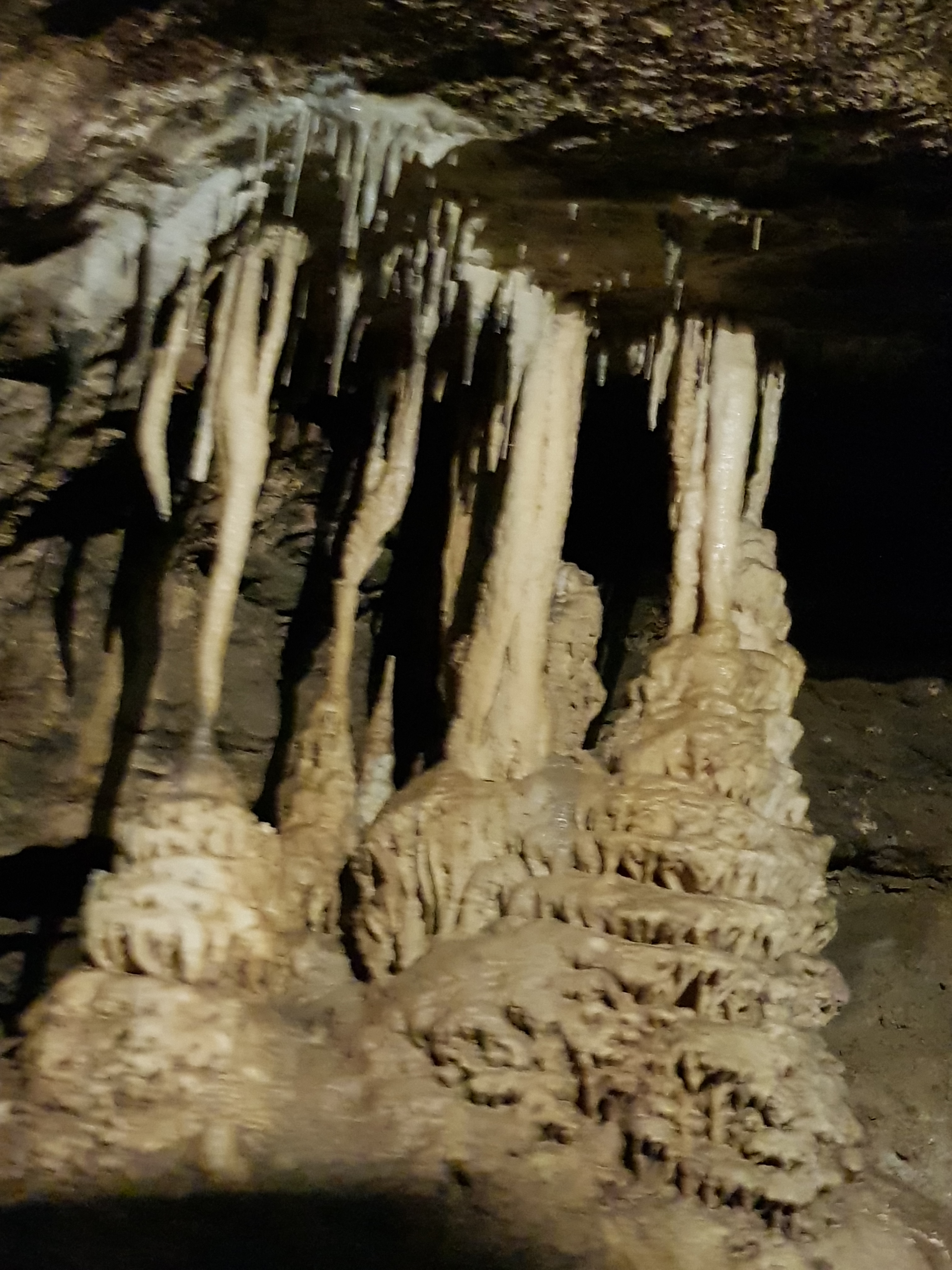

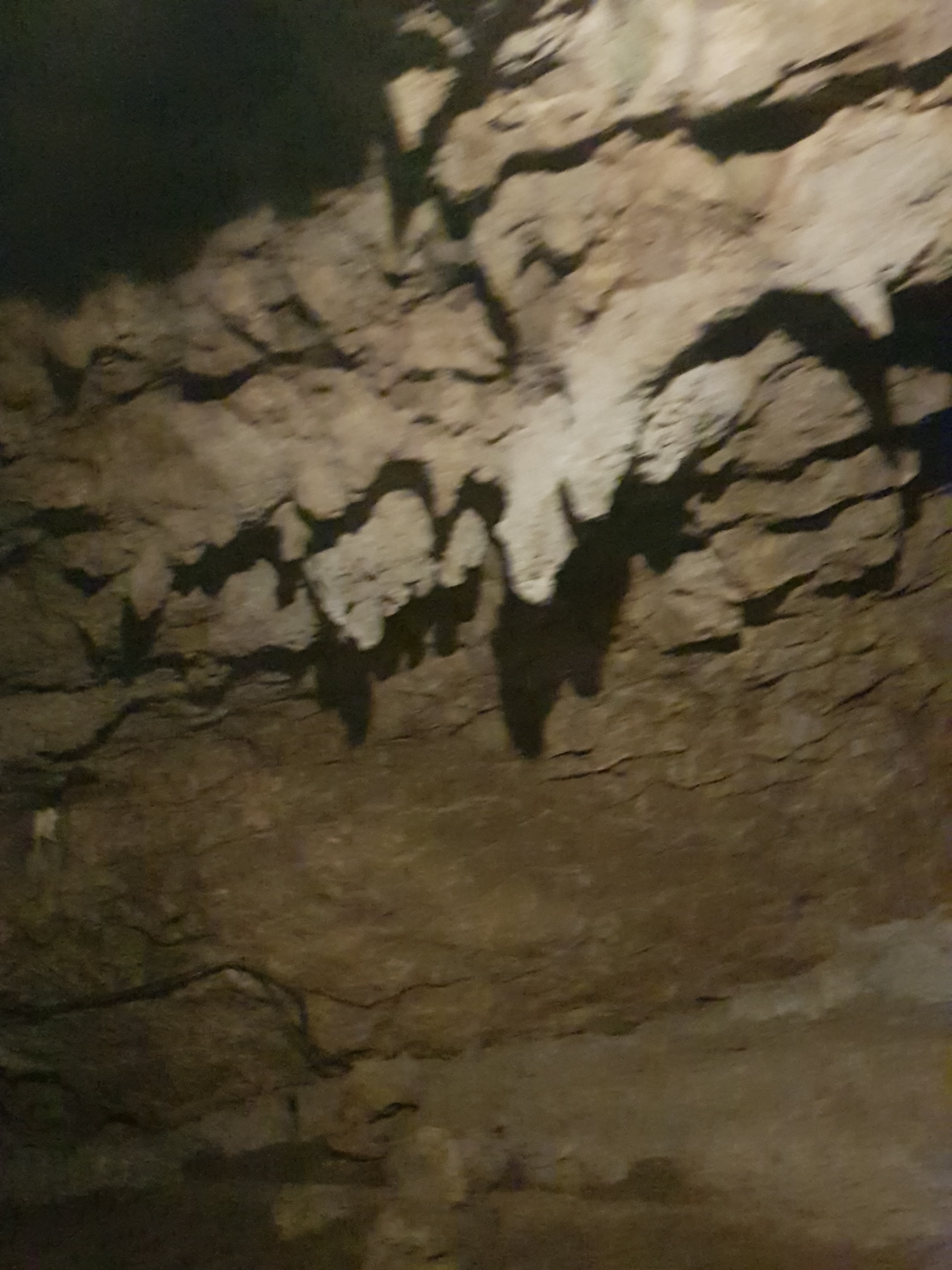

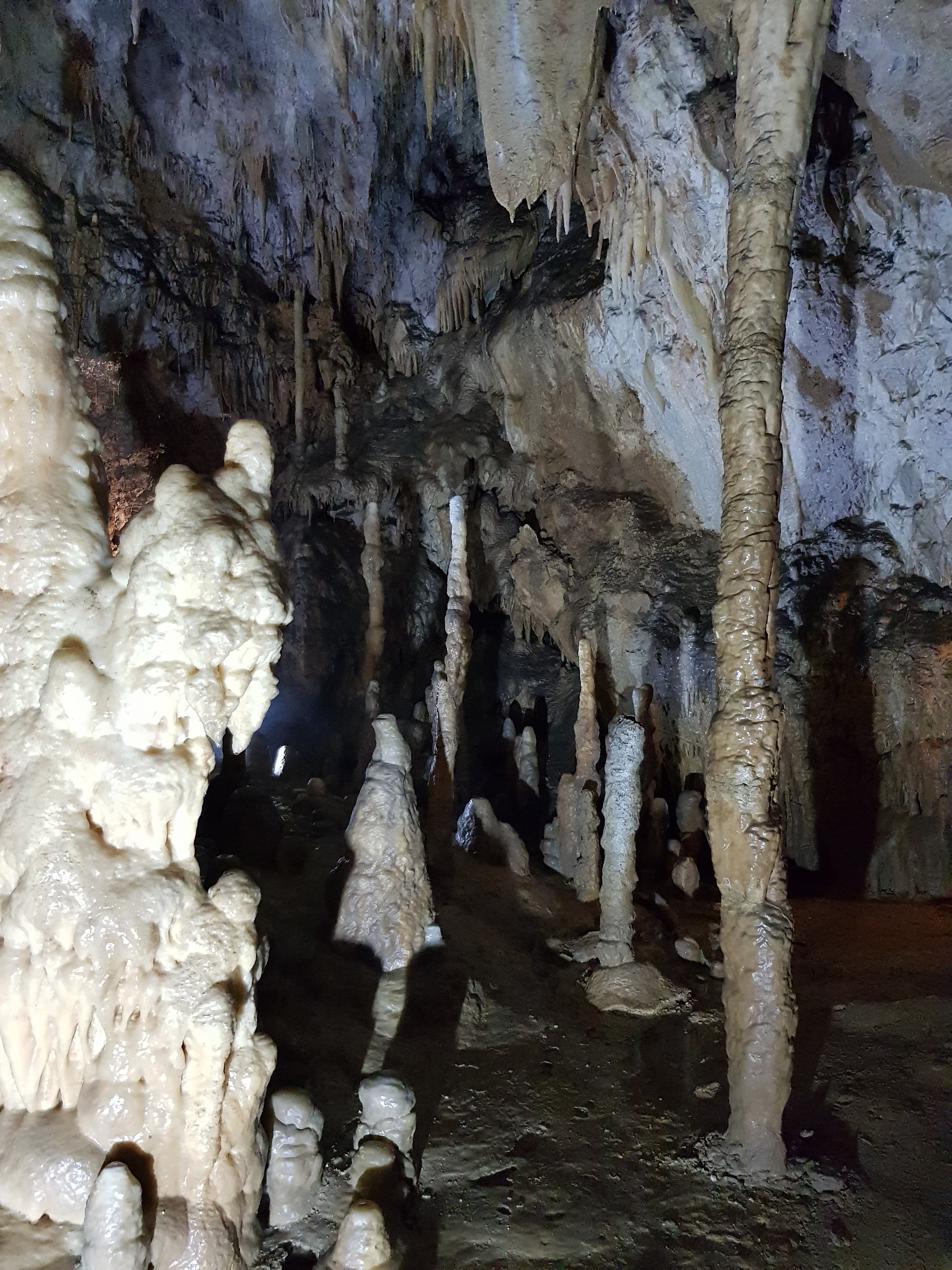

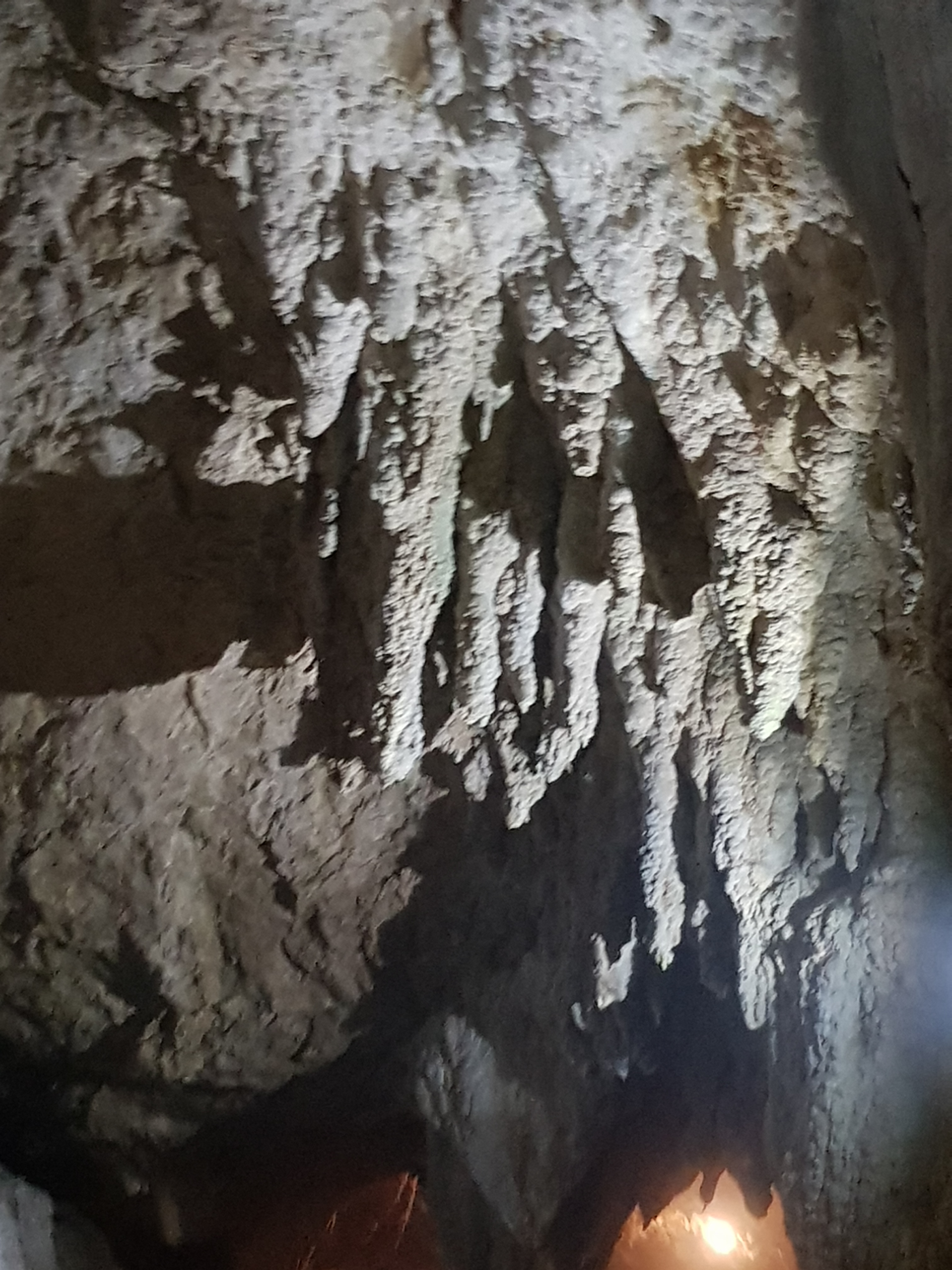

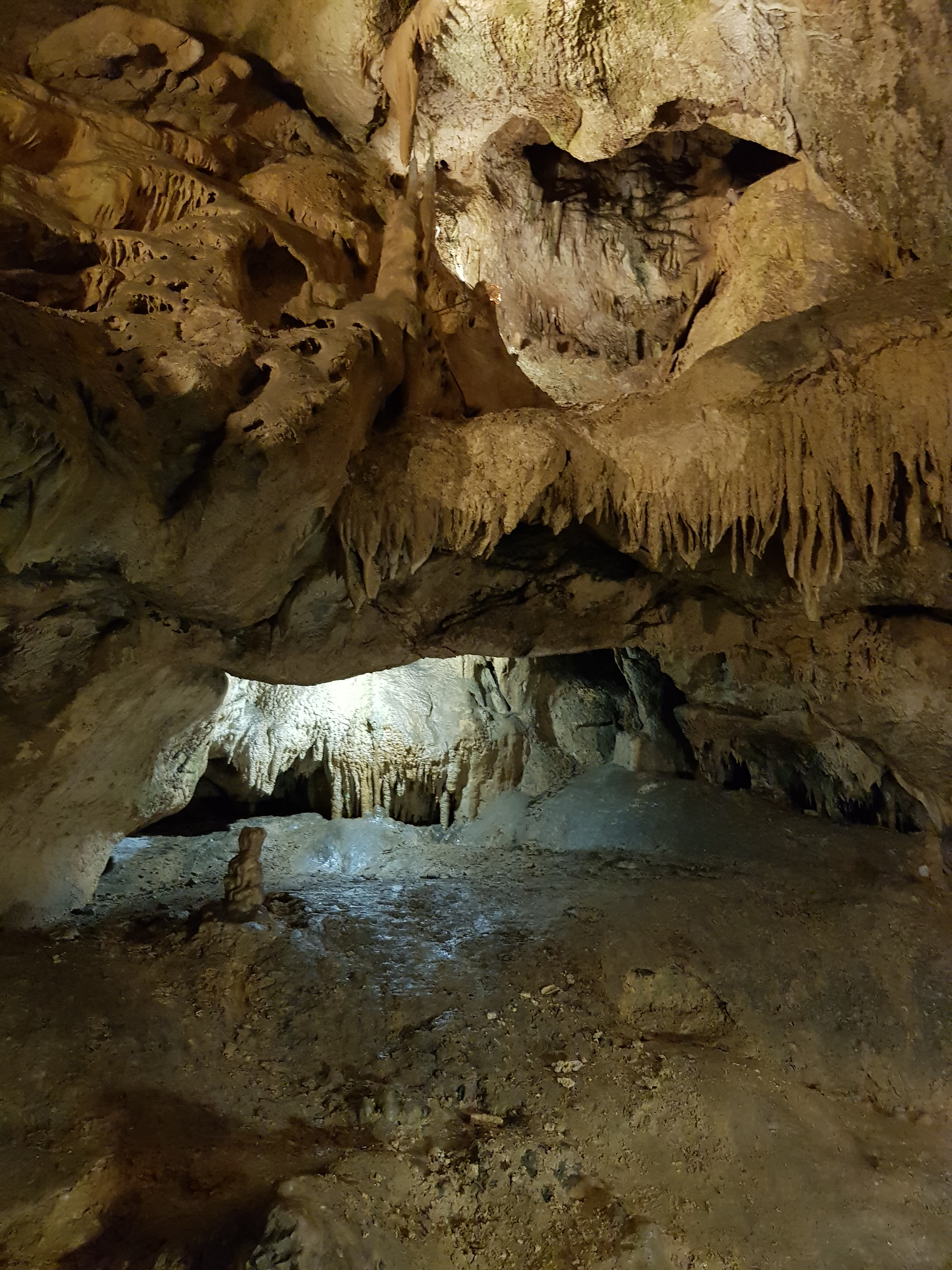

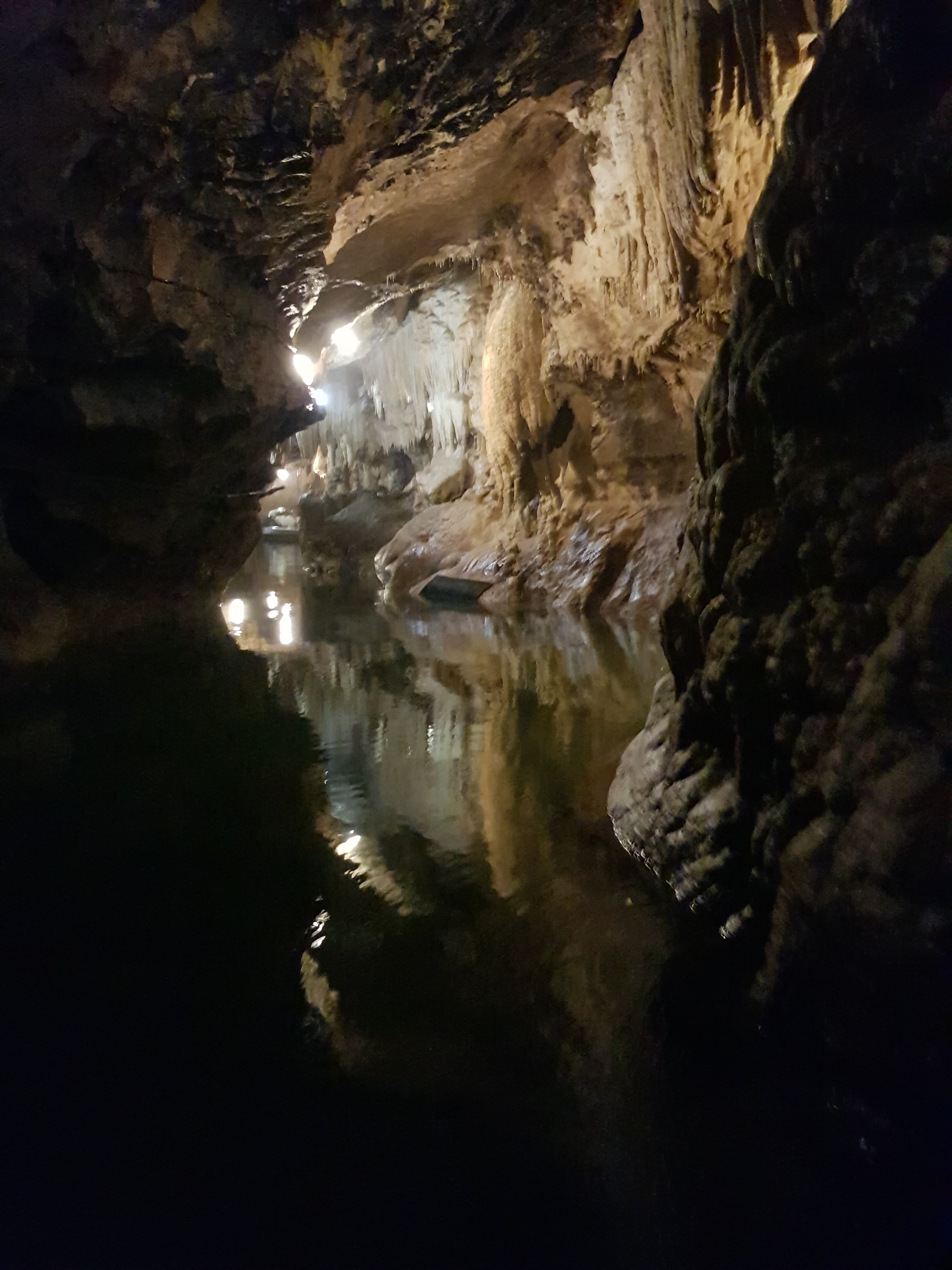

== See also ==
- Nearby prehistoric caves:
  - Grotte de La Vache
  - Lombrives caves
  - Grotte de Sabart
  - Niaux Cave
- Magdalenian
- List of caves in France
