= Burret =

Commune in Occitanie, France

- Commune
- Location of Burret
- Location within France Location within Occitanie
- Coordinates: 42°57′18″N 1°28′50″E
- Country: France
- Region: Occitania
- Department: Ariège
- Arrondissement: Foix
- Canton: Val d'Ariège
- Intercommunality: CA Pays Foix-Varilhes

Government
  - Mayor (2020–2026): Jean-Pierre Villeneuve
- Area^{1}: 4.96 km^{2} (1.92 sq mi)
- Elevation: 700 m (2,300 ft)
- Highest elevation: 1,203 m (3,947 ft)
- Lowest elevation: 587 m (1,926 ft)
- Population (2023): 44
  - Density: 8.9/km^{2} (23/sq mi)
- Time zone: UTC+01:00 (CET)
  - Summer (DST): UTC+02:00 (CEST)
- INSEE/Postal code: 09068 /09000
- ^{1} French Land Register data, which excludes lakes, ponds, glaciers > 1 km^{2} (0.386 sq mi or 247 acres) and river estuaries.

Burret (French pronunciation: [byʁɛ]) is a commune in the Ariège department of southwestern France.

== Population ==
Historical population
Year	Pop.	±% p.a.
1968	16	—
1975	12	−4.03%
1982	31	+14.52%
1990	18	−6.57%
1999	22	+2.25%
2007	36	+6.35%
2012	44	+4.10%
2017	39	−2.38%
2023	44	+2.03%
Source: INSEE

Inhabitants of Burret are called Burretois in French.

== See also ==
- Communes of the Ariège department
