= Crampagna =

Commune in Occitanie, France

- Commune
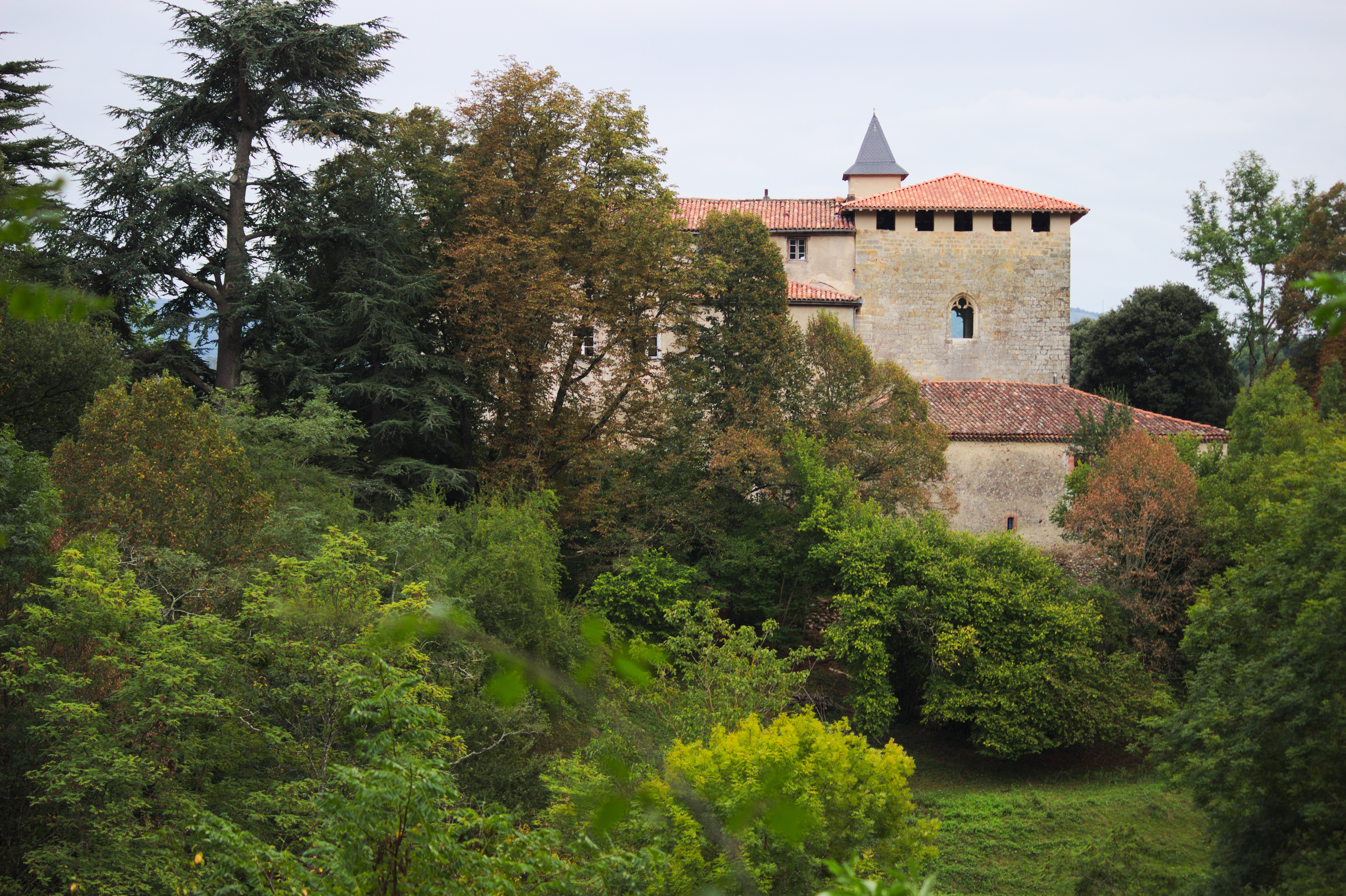
- The château in Crampagna
- Location of Crampagna
- Location within France Location within Occitanie
- Coordinates: 43°01′48″N 1°36′27″E
- Country: France
- Region: Occitania
- Department: Ariège
- Arrondissement: Foix
- Canton: Val d'Ariège
- Intercommunality: CA Pays Foix-Varilhes

Government
  - Mayor (2020–2026): Michel Mabillot
- Area^{1}: 10.02 km^{2} (3.87 sq mi)
- Elevation: 350 m (1,150 ft)
- Highest elevation: 686 m (2,251 ft)
- Lowest elevation: 335 m (1,099 ft)
- Population (2023): 980
  - Density: 98/km^{2} (250/sq mi)
- Time zone: UTC+01:00 (CET)
  - Summer (DST): UTC+02:00 (CEST)
- INSEE/Postal code: 09103 /09120
- ^{1} French Land Register data, which excludes lakes, ponds, glaciers > 1 km^{2} (0.386 sq mi or 247 acres) and river estuaries.

Crampagna (French pronunciation: [kʁɑ̃paɲa]; Occitan: Crampanhan) is a commune in the Ariège department in southwestern France.

== Population ==
Historical population
Year	Pop.	±% p.a.
1968	321	—
1975	308	−0.59%
1982	404	+3.95%
1990	509	+2.93%
1999	560	+1.07%
2007	608	+1.03%
2012	735	+3.87%
2017	840	+2.71%
2023	980	+2.60%
Source: INSEE

== See also ==
- Communes of the Ariège department
