= Saint-Félix-de-Rieutord =

Commune in Occitanie, France

- Commune
- Location of Saint-Félix-de-Rieutord
- Location within France Location within Occitanie
- Coordinates: 43°02′50″N 1°40′26″E
- Country: France
- Region: Occitania
- Department: Ariège
- Arrondissement: Foix
- Canton: Val d'Ariège
- Intercommunality: CA Pays Foix-Varilhes

Government
  - Mayor (2020–2026): Daniel Besnard
- Area^{1}: 6.77 km^{2} (2.61 sq mi)
- Highest elevation: 582 m (1,909 ft)
- Lowest elevation: 348 m (1,142 ft)
- Population (2023): 468
  - Density: 69.1/km^{2} (179/sq mi)
- Time zone: UTC+01:00 (CET)
  - Summer (DST): UTC+02:00 (CEST)
- INSEE/Postal code: 09258 /09120
- ^{1} French Land Register data, which excludes lakes, ponds, glaciers > 1 km^{2} (0.386 sq mi or 247 acres) and river estuaries.

Saint-Félix-de-Rieutord (French pronunciation: [sɛ̃ feliks də ʁjœtɔʁ]; Languedocien: Sent Felitz de Riutòrt) is a commune in the Ariège department in southwestern France.

== Population ==
Inhabitants of Saint-Félix-de-Rieutord are called Saint-Félixéens in French.

Historical population
Year	Pop.	±% p.a.
1968	107	—
1975	135	+3.38%
1982	192	+5.16%
1990	278	+4.74%
1999	328	+1.85%
2007	398	+2.45%
2012	446	+2.30%
2017	460	+0.62%
2023	468	+0.29%
Source: INSEE

== See also ==
- Communes of the Ariège department
