= Bénac, Ariège =

Commune in Occitanie, France

Bénac
- Commune
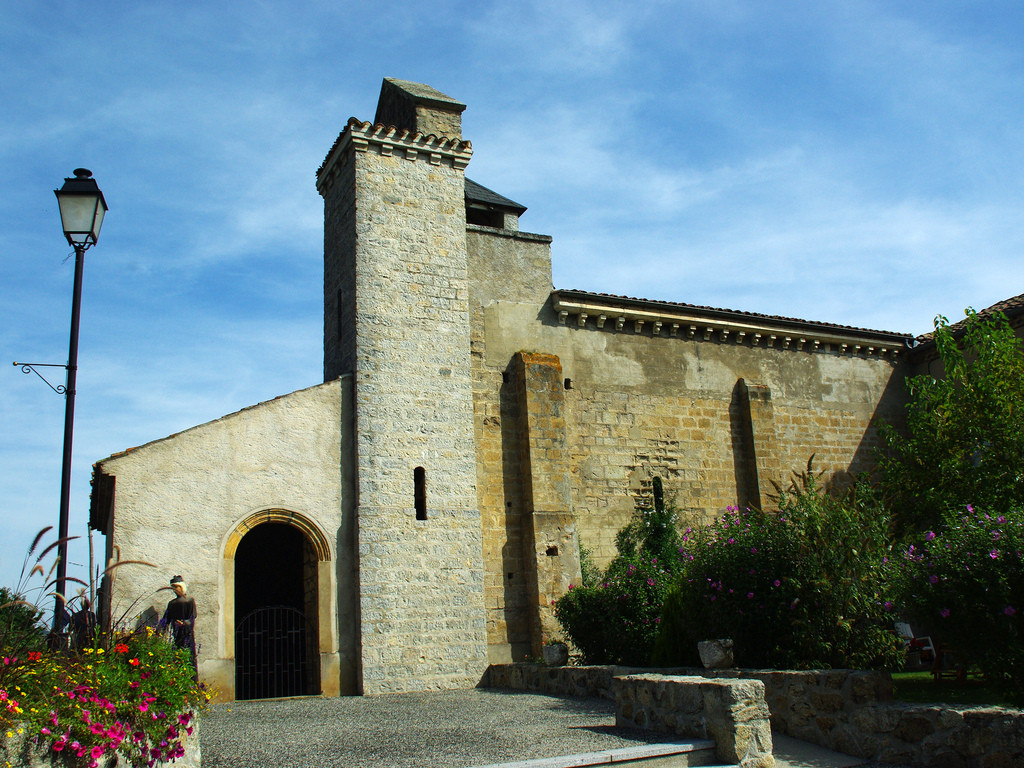
- The church in Bénac
- Location of Bénac
- Location within France Location within Occitanie
- Coordinates: 42°57′21″N 1°31′57″E
- Country: France
- Region: Occitania
- Department: Ariège
- Arrondissement: Foix
- Canton: Val d'Ariège
- Intercommunality: CA Pays Foix-Varilhes

Government
  - Mayor (2020–2026): Paul Cayrol
- Area^{1}: 2.8 km^{2} (1.1 sq mi)
- Elevation: 550 m (1,800 ft)
- Highest elevation: 920 m (3,020 ft)
- Lowest elevation: 455 m (1,493 ft)
- Population (2023): 173
  - Density: 62/km^{2} (160/sq mi)
- Time zone: UTC+01:00 (CET)
  - Summer (DST): UTC+02:00 (CEST)
- INSEE/Postal code: 09049 /09000
- ^{1} French Land Register data, which excludes lakes, ponds, glaciers > 1 km^{2} (0.386 sq mi or 247 acres) and river estuaries.

Bénac (French pronunciation: [benak]; Occitan: Benac) is a commune in the Ariège department of southwestern France.

== Population ==
Historical population
Year	Pop.	±% p.a.
1968	107	—
1975	86	−3.07%
1982	118	+4.62%
1990	125	+0.72%
1999	152	+2.20%
2007	187	+2.62%
2012	169	−2.00%
2017	182	+1.49%
2023	173	−0.84%
Source: INSEE

Inhabitants of Bénac are called Bénacois in French.

== See also ==
- Communes of the Ariège department
