= Coussa =

Commune in Occitanie, France

- Commune
- Location of Coussa
- Location within France Location within Occitanie
- Coordinates: 43°03′51″N 1°40′48″E
- Country: France
- Region: Occitania
- Department: Ariège
- Arrondissement: Foix
- Canton: Val d'Ariège
- Intercommunality: CA Pays Foix-Varilhes

Government
  - Mayor (2020–2026): Raymond Fis
- Area^{1}: 7.71 km^{2} (2.98 sq mi)
- Elevation: 305 m (1,001 ft)
- Highest elevation: 481 m (1,578 ft)
- Lowest elevation: 312 m (1,024 ft)
- Population (2023): 268
  - Density: 34.8/km^{2} (90.0/sq mi)
- Time zone: UTC+01:00 (CET)
  - Summer (DST): UTC+02:00 (CEST)
- INSEE/Postal code: 09101 /09120
- ^{1} French Land Register data, which excludes lakes, ponds, glaciers > 1 km^{2} (0.386 sq mi or 247 acres) and river estuaries.

Coussa (French pronunciation: [kusa]; Occitan: Coçan) is a commune in the Ariège department in southwestern France.

== Population ==
Historical population
Year	Pop.	±% p.a.
1968	154	—
1975	120	−3.50%
1982	126	+0.70%
1990	149	+2.12%
1999	201	+3.38%
2007	216	+0.90%
2012	228	+1.09%
2017	265	+3.05%
2023	268	+0.19%
Source: INSEE

== See also ==
- Communes of the Ariège department
