= Gudas, Ariège =

Commune in Occitanie, France

Gudas
- Commune
- Location of Gudas
- Location within France Location within Occitanie
- Coordinates: 43°00′35″N 1°40′36″E
- Country: France
- Region: Occitania
- Department: Ariège
- Arrondissement: Foix
- Canton: Val d'Ariège
- Intercommunality: CA Pays Foix-Varilhes

Government
  - Mayor (2020–2026): Yves Marcerou
- Area^{1}: 10.73 km^{2} (4.14 sq mi)
- Elevation: 400 m (1,300 ft)
- Highest elevation: 706 m (2,316 ft)
- Lowest elevation: 383 m (1,257 ft)
- Population (2023): 193
  - Density: 18.0/km^{2} (46.6/sq mi)
- Time zone: UTC+01:00 (CET)
  - Summer (DST): UTC+02:00 (CEST)
- INSEE/Postal code: 09137 /09120
- ^{1} French Land Register data, which excludes lakes, ponds, glaciers > 1 km^{2} (0.386 sq mi or 247 acres) and river estuaries.

Gudas (French pronunciation: [ɡydas]; Occitan: Gudàs) is a commune in the Ariège department in southwestern France.

== Population ==
Historical population
Year	Pop.	±% p.a.
1968	87	—
1975	75	−2.10%
1982	73	−0.39%
1990	86	+2.07%
1999	107	+2.46%
2007	134	+2.85%
2012	156	+3.09%
2017	183	+3.24%
2023	193	+0.89%
Source: INSEE

== See also ==
- Communes of the Ariège department
