= Ségura =

Commune in Occitanie, France

- Commune
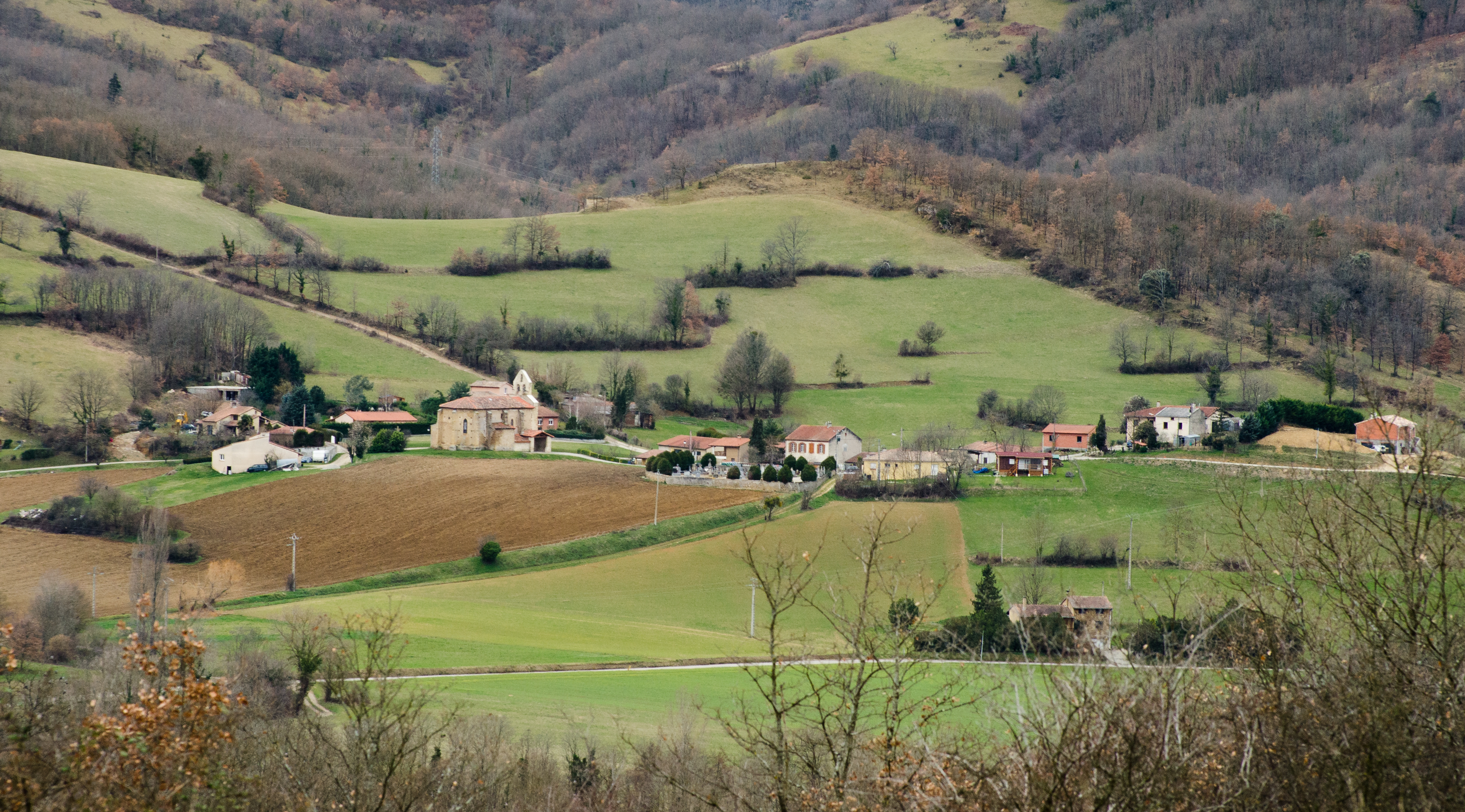
- A general view of Ségura

- Coat of arms
- Location of Ségura
- Location within France Location within Occitanie
- Coordinates: 43°02′15″N 1°41′30″E
- Country: France
- Region: Occitania
- Department: Ariège
- Arrondissement: Foix
- Canton: Val d'Ariège
- Intercommunality: CA Pays Foix-Varilhes

Government
  - Mayor (2020–2026): Jean-Claude Campourcy
- Area^{1}: 8.77 km^{2} (3.39 sq mi)
- Elevation: 400 m (1,300 ft)
- Highest elevation: 689 m (2,260 ft)
- Lowest elevation: 366 m (1,201 ft)
- Population (2023): 199
  - Density: 22.7/km^{2} (58.8/sq mi)
- Time zone: UTC+01:00 (CET)
  - Summer (DST): UTC+02:00 (CEST)
- INSEE/Postal code: 09284 /09120
- ^{1} French Land Register data, which excludes lakes, ponds, glaciers > 1 km^{2} (0.386 sq mi or 247 acres) and river estuaries.

Ségura (French pronunciation: [seɡyʁa]; Occitan: Seguran) is a commune in the Ariège department in southwestern France.

== Population ==
Inhabitants of Ségura are called Séguriens in French.

Historical population
Year	Pop.	±% p.a.
1968	79	—
1975	65	−2.75%
1982	91	+4.92%
1990	105	+1.80%
1999	139	+3.17%
2007	161	+1.85%
2012	175	+1.68%
2017	184	+1.01%
2023	199	+1.31%
Source: INSEE

== See also ==
- Communes of the Ariège department
