= Serres-sur-Arget =

Commune in Occitanie, France

- Commune
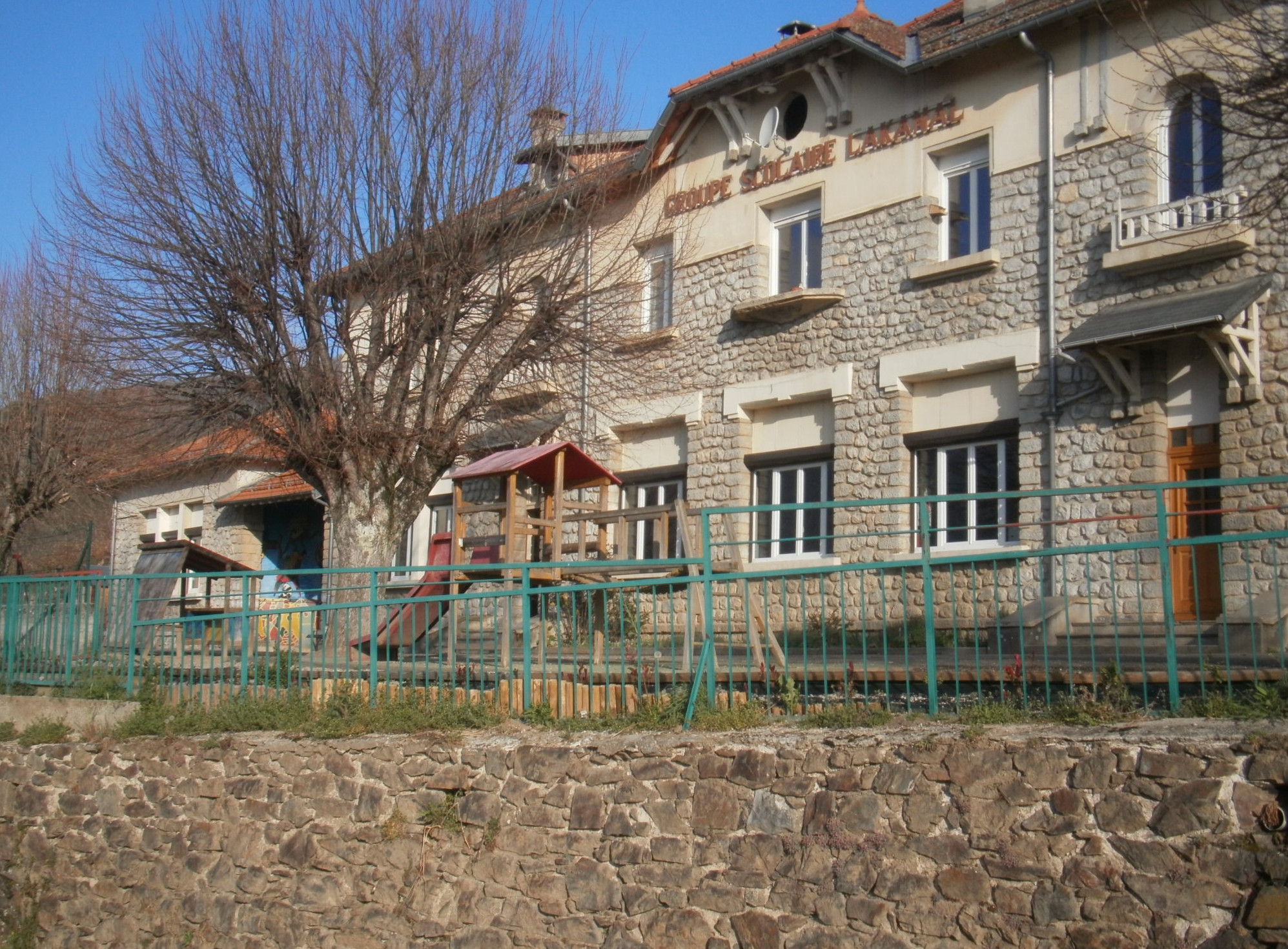
- School
- Location of Serres-sur-Arget
- Location within France Location within Occitanie
- Coordinates: 42°58′12″N 1°31′10″E
- Country: France
- Region: Occitania
- Department: Ariège
- Arrondissement: Foix
- Canton: Val d'Ariège
- Intercommunality: CA Pays Foix-Varilhes

Government
  - Mayor (2020–2026): Alain Garnier
- Area^{1}: 17.73 km^{2} (6.85 sq mi)
- Elevation: 500 m (1,600 ft)
- Highest elevation: 1,056 m (3,465 ft)
- Lowest elevation: 469 m (1,539 ft)
- Population (2023): 819
  - Density: 46.2/km^{2} (120/sq mi)
- Time zone: UTC+01:00 (CET)
  - Summer (DST): UTC+02:00 (CEST)
- INSEE/Postal code: 09293 /09000
- ^{1} French Land Register data, which excludes lakes, ponds, glaciers > 1 km^{2} (0.386 sq mi or 247 acres) and river estuaries.

Serres-sur-Arget (Occitan: Sèrras d'Arget) is a commune in the Ariège department in southwestern France.

== Population ==
Inhabitants of Serres-sur-Arget are called Serrésiens in French.

Historical population
Year	Pop.	±% p.a.
1968	444	—
1975	385	−2.02%
1982	460	+2.58%
1990	565	+2.60%
1999	701	+2.43%
2007	778	+1.31%
2012	782	+0.10%
2017	687	−2.56%
2023	819	+2.97%
Source: INSEE

== See also ==
- Communes of the Ariège department
