= Calzan =

Commune in Occitanie, France

- Commune
- Coat of arms
- Location of Calzan
- Location within France Location within Occitanie
- Coordinates: 43°02′21″N 1°44′18″E
- Country: France
- Region: Occitania
- Department: Ariège
- Arrondissement: Foix
- Canton: Val d'Ariège
- Intercommunality: CA Pays Foix-Varilhes

Government
  - Mayor (2022–2026): Denis Martinez
- Area^{1}: 3.99 km^{2} (1.54 sq mi)
- Elevation: 250 m (820 ft)
- Highest elevation: 631 m (2,070 ft)
- Lowest elevation: 318 m (1,043 ft)
- Population (2023): 45
  - Density: 11/km^{2} (29/sq mi)
- Time zone: UTC+01:00 (CET)
  - Summer (DST): UTC+02:00 (CEST)
- INSEE/Postal code: 09072 /09120
- ^{1} French Land Register data, which excludes lakes, ponds, glaciers > 1 km^{2} (0.386 sq mi or 247 acres) and river estuaries.

Calzan (French pronunciation: [kalzɑ̃]) is a commune in the Ariège department in southwestern France.

== Population ==
Historical population
Year	Pop.	±% p.a.
1968	37	—
1975	30	−2.95%
1982	32	+0.93%
1990	25	−3.04%
1999	25	+0.00%
2007	27	+0.97%
2012	27	+0.00%
2017	32	+3.46%
2023	45	+5.85%
Source: INSEE

== See also ==
- Communes of the Ariège department
