= Ventenac =

Commune in Occitanie, France

- Commune
- Coat of arms
- Location of Ventenac
- Location within France Location within Occitanie
- Coordinates: 43°00′25″N 1°43′53″E
- Country: France
- Region: Occitania
- Department: Ariège
- Arrondissement: Foix
- Canton: Val d'Ariège
- Intercommunality: CA Pays Foix-Varilhes

Government
  - Mayor (2023–2026): Jacques Lucat
- Area^{1}: 19.62 km^{2} (7.58 sq mi)
- Elevation: 450 m (1,480 ft)
- Highest elevation: 730 m (2,400 ft)
- Lowest elevation: 410 m (1,350 ft)
- Population (2023): 234
  - Density: 11.9/km^{2} (30.9/sq mi)
- Time zone: UTC+01:00 (CET)
  - Summer (DST): UTC+02:00 (CEST)
- INSEE/Postal code: 09327 /09120
- ^{1} French Land Register data, which excludes lakes, ponds, glaciers > 1 km^{2} (0.386 sq mi or 247 acres) and river estuaries.

Ventenac is a commune in the Ariège department in southwestern France.

== Population ==
Inhabitants of Ventenac are called Ventenacois in French.

Historical population
Year	Pop.	±% p.a.
1968	170	—
1975	183	+1.06%
1982	175	−0.64%
1990	182	+0.49%
1999	198	+0.94%
2007	228	+1.78%
2012	224	−0.35%
2017	235	+0.96%
2023	234	−0.07%
Source: INSEE

== See also ==
- Communes of the Ariège department
