= Malléon =

Commune in Occitanie, France

- Commune
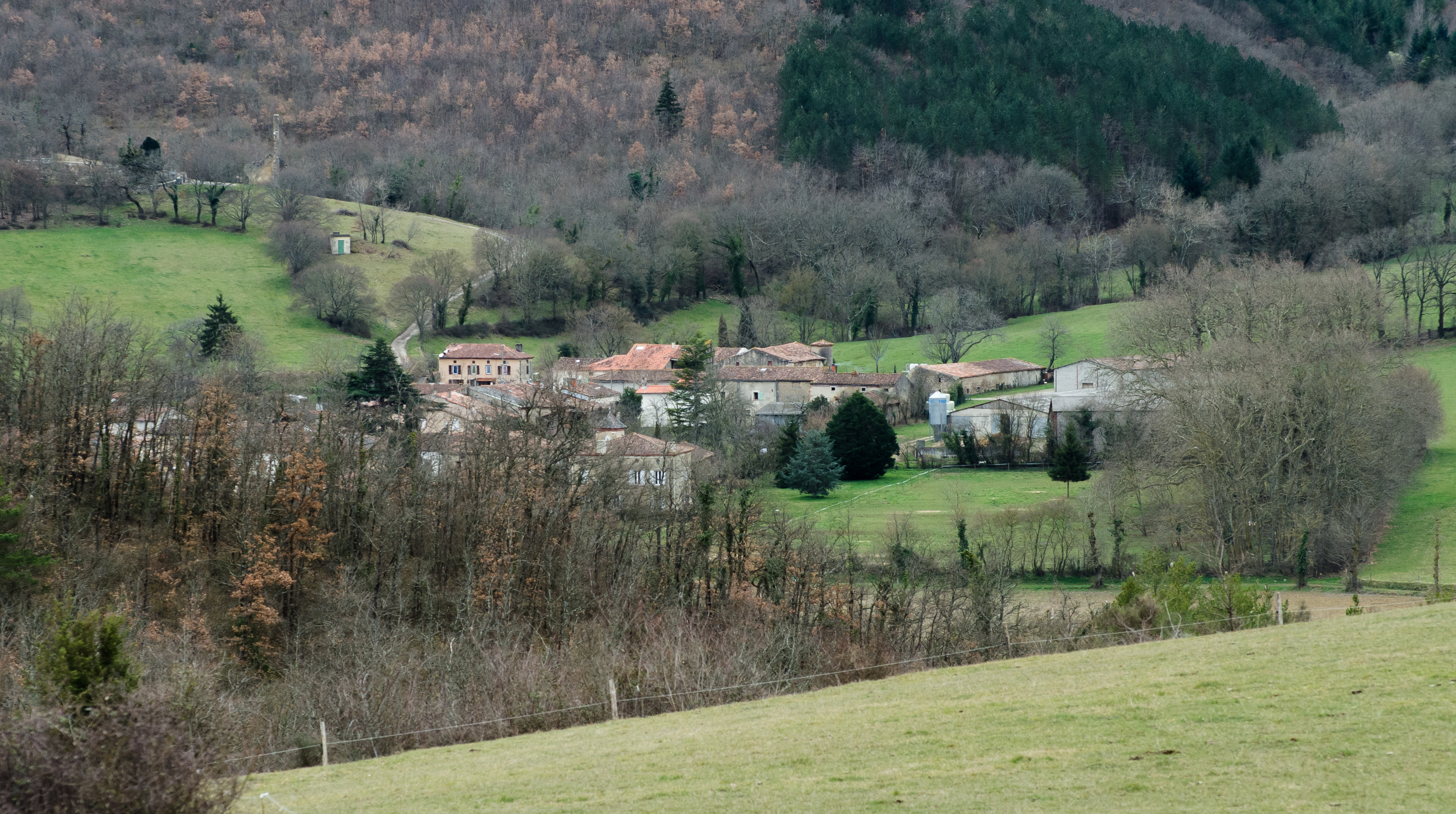
- A general view of Malléon
- Location of Malléon
- Location within France Location within Occitanie
- Coordinates: 43°01′59″N 1°42′46″E
- Country: France
- Region: Occitania
- Department: Ariège
- Arrondissement: Foix
- Canton: Val d'Ariège
- Intercommunality: CA Pays Foix-Varilhes

Government
  - Mayor (2020–2026): Colette Lagarde-Authié
- Area^{1}: 6.78 km^{2} (2.62 sq mi)
- Elevation: 870 m (2,850 ft)
- Highest elevation: 730 m (2,400 ft)
- Lowest elevation: 359 m (1,178 ft)
- Population (2023): 77
  - Density: 11/km^{2} (29/sq mi)
- Time zone: UTC+01:00 (CET)
  - Summer (DST): UTC+02:00 (CEST)
- INSEE/Postal code: 09179 /09120
- ^{1} French Land Register data, which excludes lakes, ponds, glaciers > 1 km^{2} (0.386 sq mi or 247 acres) and river estuaries.

Malléon (French pronunciation: [maleɔ̃]; Occitan: Malleon) is a commune in the Ariège department in southwestern France.

== Population ==
Historical population
Year	Pop.	±% p.a.
1968	65	—
1975	52	−3.14%
1982	46	−1.74%
1990	43	−0.84%
1999	33	−2.90%
2007	47	+4.52%
2012	55	+3.19%
2017	73	+5.83%
2023	77	+0.89%
Source: INSEE

== See also ==
- Communes of the Ariège department
