= Pradières =

Commune in Occitanie, France

- Commune
- Location of Pradières
- Location within France Location within Occitanie
- Coordinates: 42°58′02″N 1°39′13″E
- Country: France
- Region: Occitania
- Department: Ariège
- Arrondissement: Foix
- Canton: Val d'Ariège
- Intercommunality: CA Pays Foix-Varilhes

Government
  - Mayor (2020–2026): Serge Palacios
- Area^{1}: 6.79 km^{2} (2.62 sq mi)
- Elevation: 500 m (1,600 ft)
- Highest elevation: 940 m (3,080 ft)
- Lowest elevation: 415 m (1,362 ft)
- Population (2023): 124
  - Density: 18.3/km^{2} (47.3/sq mi)
- Time zone: UTC+01:00 (CET)
  - Summer (DST): UTC+02:00 (CEST)
- INSEE/Postal code: 09234 /09000
- ^{1} French Land Register data, which excludes lakes, ponds, glaciers > 1 km^{2} (0.386 sq mi or 247 acres) and river estuaries.

Pradières (French pronunciation: [pʁadjɛʁ]; Occitan: Pradièras) is a commune in the Ariège department in southwestern France.

== Population ==
Inhabitants are called Pradiérois in French.

Historical population
Year	Pop.	±% p.a.
1968	52	—
1975	62	+2.54%
1982	102	+7.37%
1990	103	+0.12%
1999	107	+0.42%
2007	105	−0.24%
2012	115	+1.84%
2017	115	+0.00%
2023	124	+1.26%
Source: INSEE

== See also ==
- Communes of the Ariège department
