= Communauté d'agglomération Pays Foix-Varilhes =

Pays Foix-Varilhes
- Communauté d'agglomération
- Interactive map of Pays Foix-Varilhes
- Coordinates: 43°00′N 01°37′E
- Country: France
- Region: Occitania
- Department: Ariège
- No. of communes: {{{nbcomm}}}
- Established: 2017
- Area: 443.8 km^{2} (171.4 sq mi)
- Population (2019): 31,947
  - Density: 71.99/km^{2} (186.4/sq mi)
- Website: www.agglo-foix-varilhes.fr

Communauté d'agglomération Pays Foix-Varilhes is the communauté d'agglomération, an intercommunal structure, centred on the town of Foix. It is located in the Ariège department, in the Occitania region, southern France. Created in 2017, its seat is in Foix. Its area is 443.8 km^{2}. Its population was 31,947 in 2019, of which 9,493 in Foix proper.

== Composition ==
The communauté d'agglomération consists of the following 42 communes:

1. Arabaux
2. Artix
3. Baulou
4. Bénac
5. Le Bosc
6. Brassac
7. Burret
8. Calzan
9. Cazaux
10. Celles
11. Cos
12. Coussa
13. Crampagna
14. Dalou
15. Ferrières-sur-Ariège
16. Foix
17. Ganac
18. Gudas
19. L'Herm
20. Loubens
21. Loubières
22. Malléon
23. Montégut-Plantaurel
24. Montgailhard
25. Montoulieu
26. Pradières
27. Prayols
28. Rieux-de-Pelleport
29. Saint-Bauzeil
30. Saint-Félix-de-Rieutord
31. Saint-Jean-de-Verges
32. Saint-Martin-de-Caralp
33. Saint-Paul-de-Jarrat
34. Saint-Pierre-de-Rivière
35. Ségura
36. Serres-sur-Arget
37. Soula
38. Varilhes
39. Ventenac
40. Vernajoul
41. Verniolle
42. Vira
