= Vira, Ariège =

Commune in Occitanie, France

Vira
- Commune
- Coat of arms
- Location of Vira
- Location within France Location within Occitanie
- Coordinates: 43°03′08″N 1°45′34″E
- Country: France
- Region: Occitania
- Department: Ariège
- Arrondissement: Foix
- Canton: Val d'Ariège
- Intercommunality: CA Pays Foix-Varilhes

Government
  - Mayor (2020–2026): Jean-François Spriet
- Area^{1}: 5.28 km^{2} (2.04 sq mi)
- Elevation: 310 m (1,020 ft)
- Highest elevation: 577 m (1,893 ft)
- Lowest elevation: 288 m (945 ft)
- Population (2023): 161
  - Density: 30.5/km^{2} (79.0/sq mi)
- Time zone: UTC+01:00 (CET)
  - Summer (DST): UTC+02:00 (CEST)
- INSEE/Postal code: 09340 /09120
- ^{1} French Land Register data, which excludes lakes, ponds, glaciers > 1 km^{2} (0.386 sq mi or 247 acres) and river estuaries.

Vira (French pronunciation: [viʁa]; Occitan: Viran) is a commune in the Ariège department in southwestern France.

== Population ==
Inhabitants of Vira are called Virassiens in French.

Historical population
Year	Pop.	±% p.a.
1968	71	—
1975	97	+4.56%
1982	100	+0.44%
1990	120	+2.31%
1999	130	+0.89%
2007	150	+1.80%
2012	169	+2.41%
2017	160	−1.09%
2023	161	+0.10%
Source: INSEE

== See also ==
- Communes of the Ariège department
