= Soula, Ariège =

Commune in Occitanie, France

Soula
- Commune
- Coat of arms
- Location of Soula
- Location within France Location within Occitanie
- Coordinates: 42°56′38″N 1°41′41″E
- Country: France
- Region: Occitania
- Department: Ariège
- Arrondissement: Foix
- Canton: Pays d'Olmes
- Intercommunality: CA Pays Foix-Varilhes

Government
  - Mayor (2020–2026): Michel Audinos
- Area^{1}: 11.16 km^{2} (4.31 sq mi)
- Elevation: 600 m (2,000 ft)
- Highest elevation: 1,011 m (3,317 ft)
- Lowest elevation: 480 m (1,570 ft)
- Population (2023): 168
  - Density: 15.1/km^{2} (39.0/sq mi)
- Time zone: UTC+01:00 (CET)
  - Summer (DST): UTC+02:00 (CEST)
- INSEE/Postal code: 09300 /09000
- ^{1} French Land Register data, which excludes lakes, ponds, glaciers > 1 km^{2} (0.386 sq mi or 247 acres) and river estuaries.

Soula (French pronunciation: [sula]; Occitan: Solan) is a commune in the Ariège department in southwestern France. The speleologist Joseph Delteil (1909–1979) was born in Soula.

== Population ==
Inhabitants of Soula are called Soulanois in French.

Historical population
Year	Pop.	±% p.a.
1968	100	—
1975	96	−0.58%
1982	100	+0.58%
1990	153	+5.46%
1999	159	+0.43%
2007	201	+2.97%
2012	193	−0.81%
2017	177	−1.72%
2023	168	−0.87%
Source: INSEE

== See also ==
- Communes of the Ariège department
