= Verniolle =

Commune in Occitanie, France

- Commune
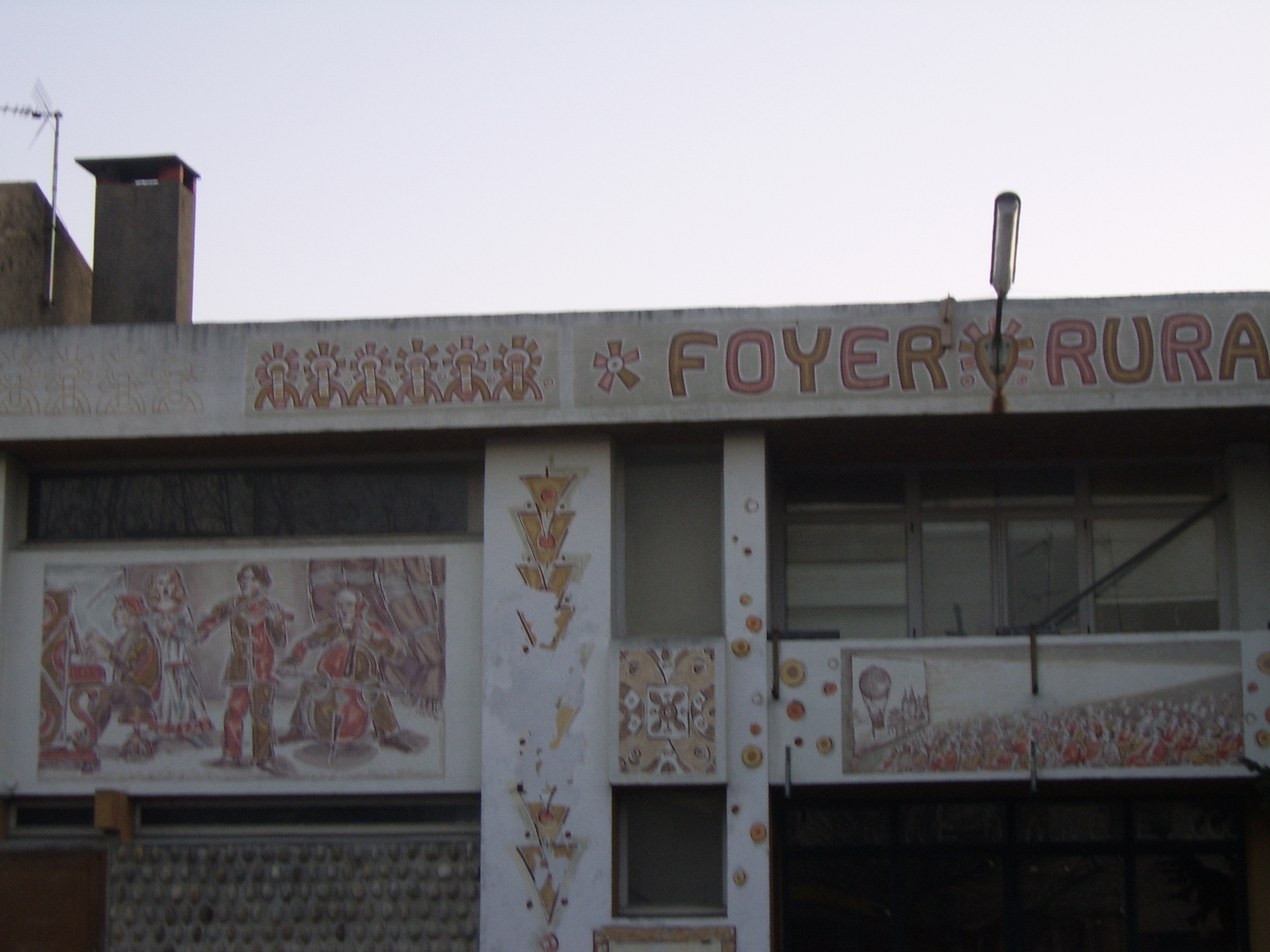
- Salle des fêtes

- Coat of arms
- Location of Verniolle
- Location within France Location within Occitanie
- Coordinates: 43°04′56″N 1°38′59″E
- Country: France
- Region: Occitania
- Department: Ariège
- Arrondissement: Foix
- Canton: Val d'Ariège
- Intercommunality: CA Pays Foix-Varilhes

Government
  - Mayor (2020–2026): Annie Bouby
- Area^{1}: 11.26 km^{2} (4.35 sq mi)
- Elevation: 320 m (1,050 ft)
- Highest elevation: 363 m (1,191 ft)
- Lowest elevation: 312 m (1,024 ft)
- Population (2023): 2,397
  - Density: 212.9/km^{2} (551.4/sq mi)
- Time zone: UTC+01:00 (CET)
  - Summer (DST): UTC+02:00 (CEST)
- INSEE/Postal code: 09332 /09340
- ^{1} French Land Register data, which excludes lakes, ponds, glaciers > 1 km^{2} (0.386 sq mi or 247 acres) and river estuaries.

Verniolle (French pronunciation: [vɛʁnjɔl]; Occitan: Vernhòla) is a commune in the Ariège department in southwestern France.

== Population ==
Inhabitants of Verniolle are called Verniollais in French.

Historical population
Year	Pop.	±% p.a.
1968	1,142	—
1975	1,302	+1.89%
1982	1,540	+2.43%
1990	1,836	+2.22%
1999	2,022	+1.08%
2007	2,215	+1.15%
2012	2,366	+1.33%
2017	2,288	−0.67%
2023	2,397	+0.78%
Source: INSEE

== See also ==
- Communes of the Ariège department
