= Arabaux =

Commune in Occitanie, France

- Commune
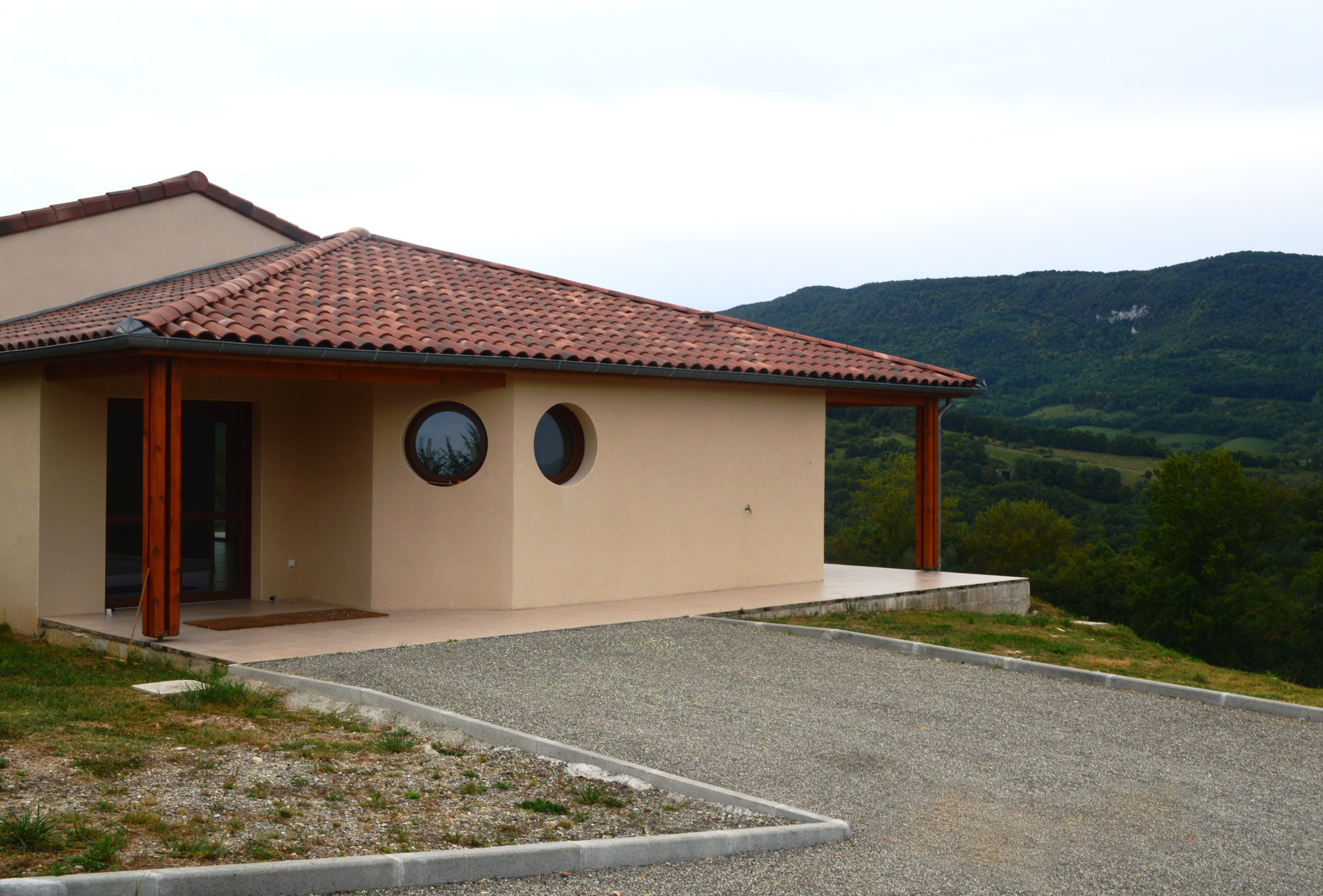
- Arabaux Community Hall
- Location of Arabaux
- Location within France Location within Occitanie
- Coordinates: 42°59′09″N 1°38′37″E
- Country: France
- Region: Occitania
- Department: Ariège
- Arrondissement: Foix
- Canton: Val d'Ariège
- Intercommunality: CA Pays Foix-Varilhes

Government
  - Mayor (2020–2026): Jean-Claude Dupuy
- Area^{1}: 4.59 km^{2} (1.77 sq mi)
- Elevation: 500 m (1,600 ft)
- Highest elevation: 826 m (2,710 ft)
- Lowest elevation: 395 m (1,296 ft)
- Population (2023): 79
  - Density: 17/km^{2} (45/sq mi)
- Time zone: UTC+01:00 (CET)
  - Summer (DST): UTC+02:00 (CEST)
- INSEE/Postal code: 09013 /09000
- ^{1} French Land Register data, which excludes lakes, ponds, glaciers > 1 km^{2} (0.386 sq mi or 247 acres) and river estuaries.

Arabaux (French pronunciation: [aʁabo]; Occitan: Aravaut) is a commune in the Ariège department in the Occitanie region of southwestern France.

== Geography ==
Arabaux is some 20 km south of Pamiers and 2 km north-east of Foix, which is the urban area to which it belongs. National Highway N20 passes through the south-western corner of the commune partly in a tunnel but it has no exit in the commune with the nearest exit being No. 10 south of Saint-Jean-de-Verges. The D1 road goes from Foix through the south of the commune and continues east to Carla-de-Roquefort. Access to the village is by country roads - one from the NR20 Exit 10 and one from the D1 on the eastern border. The commune is heavily forested in the centre and west with the rest of the land farmland.

The Alses river passes through the centre of the commune from east to west then turns north forming part of the western border to join the Ariège near the NR20 Exit 10. The Ruisseau d'Araboux rises west of the village and flows north-west to join the Ariege.

== History ==
Bernard de Lordat, co-lord of Lordat, received Arabaux in around 1250, after an exchange with the count of Foix and thus became the lord.

== Administration ==
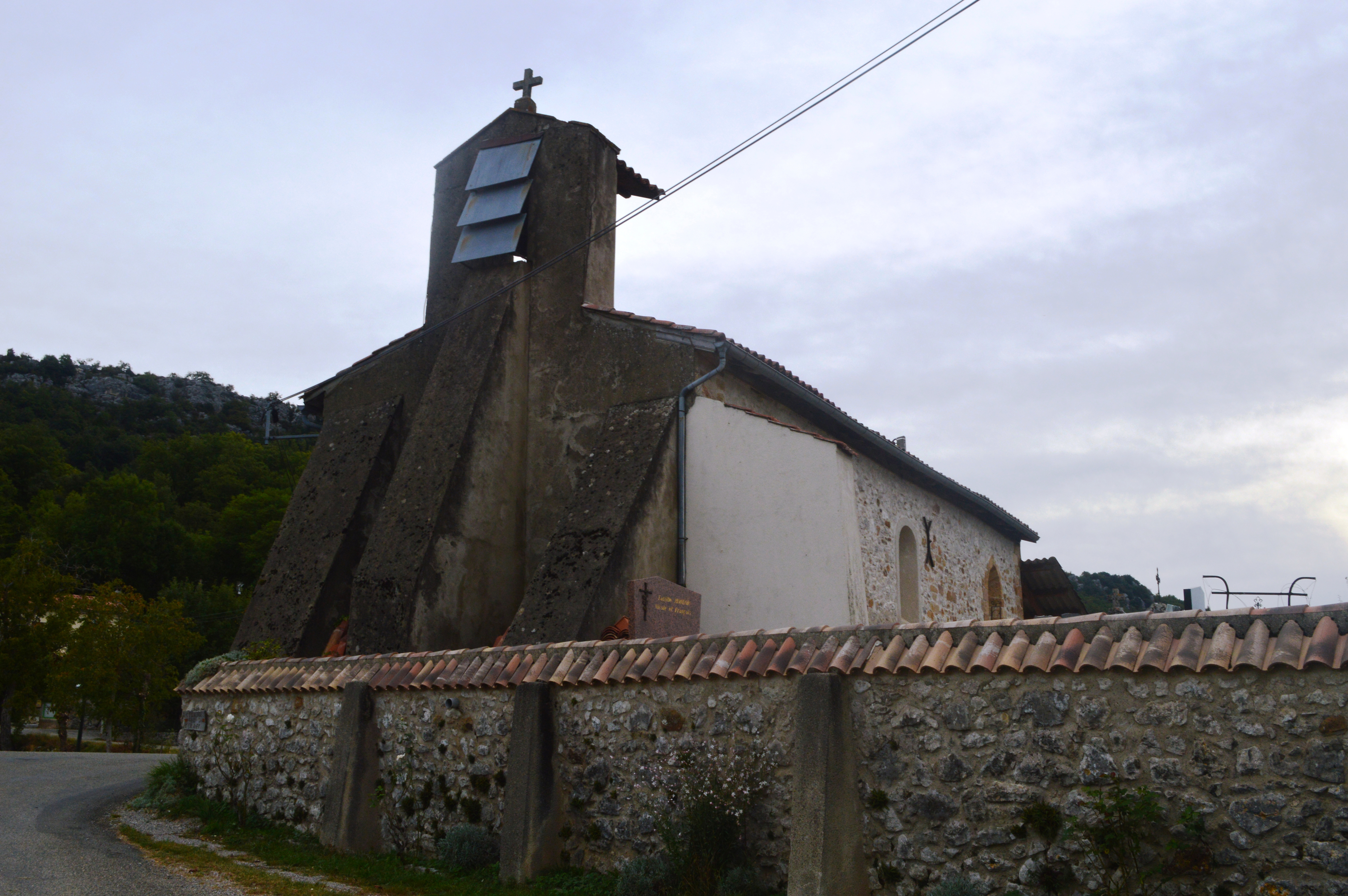
Arabaux Church

List of Successive Mayors

| From | To | Name |
|---|---|---|
| 1804 | 1808 | Jean Duran |
| 1810 | 1812 | Dominique Rouch |
| 1813 | 1813 | Pierre Rouch |
| 1816 | 1819 | François Azam Coustant |
| 1823 | 1828 | Dominique Rouch |
| 1853 | 1853 | Pierre Rouch |
| 1877 | 1878 | Jean Melet |
| 1884 | 1892 | Jean-Baptiste Marfaing |
| 2001 | 2020 | Michel Rouch |
| 2020 | 2026 | Jean-Claude Dupuy |

== Demography ==
The inhabitants of the commune are known as Arabausois or Arabausoises in French.

Historical population

| Year | Pop. | ±% p.a. |
|---|---|---|
| 1793 | 142 | — |
| 1821 | 152 | +0.24% |
| 1846 | 180 | +0.68% |
| 1872 | 149 | −0.72% |
| 1901 | 120 | −0.74% |
| 1906 | 104 | −2.82% |
| 1926 | 75 | −1.62% |
| 1946 | 62 | −0.95% |
| 1962 | 36 | −3.34% |

| Year | Pop. | ±% p.a. |
|---|---|---|
| 1968 | 47 | +4.54% |
| 1975 | 37 | −3.36% |
| 1982 | 55 | +5.83% |
| 1990 | 47 | −1.95% |
| 1999 | 54 | +1.55% |
| 2007 | 63 | +1.95% |
| 2012 | 55 | −2.68% |
| 2017 | 76 | +6.68% |
| 2023 | 79 | +0.65% |

Source: EHESS and INSEE

== See also ==
- Communes of the Ariège department

=== External links ===
- Arabaux on the National Geographic Institute website (in French)
- Arabaux on Géoportail, National Geographic Institute (IGN) website (in French)
- Arabaux on the 1750 Cassini Map
