= Cazaux =

Commune in Occitanie, France

- Commune
- Location of Cazaux
- Location within France Location within Occitanie
- Coordinates: 43°03′13″N 1°30′38″E
- Country: France
- Region: Occitania
- Department: Ariège
- Arrondissement: Foix
- Canton: Val d'Ariège
- Intercommunality: CA Pays Foix-Varilhes

Government
  - Mayor (2020–2026): Danielle Carrière
- Area^{1}: 7.37 km^{2} (2.85 sq mi)
- Elevation: 587 m (1,926 ft)
- Highest elevation: 683 m (2,241 ft)
- Lowest elevation: 354 m (1,161 ft)
- Population (2023): 48
  - Density: 6.5/km^{2} (17/sq mi)
- Time zone: UTC+01:00 (CET)
  - Summer (DST): UTC+02:00 (CEST)
- INSEE/Postal code: 09090 /09120
- ^{1} French Land Register data, which excludes lakes, ponds, glaciers > 1 km^{2} (0.386 sq mi or 247 acres) and river estuaries.

Cazaux (French pronunciation: [kazo]) is a commune of the Ariège department in southwestern France.

== Population ==
Historical population
Year	Pop.	±% p.a.
1968	53	—
1975	36	−5.38%
1982	26	−4.54%
1990	28	+0.93%
1999	44	+5.15%
2007	45	+0.28%
2012	44	−0.45%
2017	39	−2.38%
2023	48	+3.52%
Source: INSEE

== See also ==
- Communes of the Ariège department
