= Canton of Val d'Ariège =

Coordinates: 43.05°N 1.63°E

- Canton
- Situation of the canton of Val d'Ariège in the department of Ariège
- Country: France
- Region: Occitania
- Department: Ariège
- No. of communes: {{{nbcomm}}}
- Population (2023): 14,974
- INSEE code: 0913

The canton of Val d'Ariège is an administrative division of the Ariège department, southern France. It was created at the French canton reorganisation which came into effect in March 2015. Its seat is in Varilhes.

It consists of the following communes:

1. Arabaux
2. Baulou
3. Bénac
4. Le Bosc
5. Brassac
6. Burret
7. Calzan
8. Cazaux
9. Coussa
10. Crampagna
11. Dalou
12. Gudas
13. L'Herm
14. Loubens
15. Loubières
16. Malléon
17. Montégut-Plantaurel
18. Pradières
19. Saint-Félix-de-Rieutord
20. Saint-Jean-de-Verges
21. Saint-Martin-de-Caralp
22. Ségura
23. Serres-sur-Arget
24. Varilhes
25. Ventenac
26. Vernajoul
27. Verniolle
28. Vira
