= Saint-Martin-de-Caralp =

Commune in Occitanie, France

- Commune
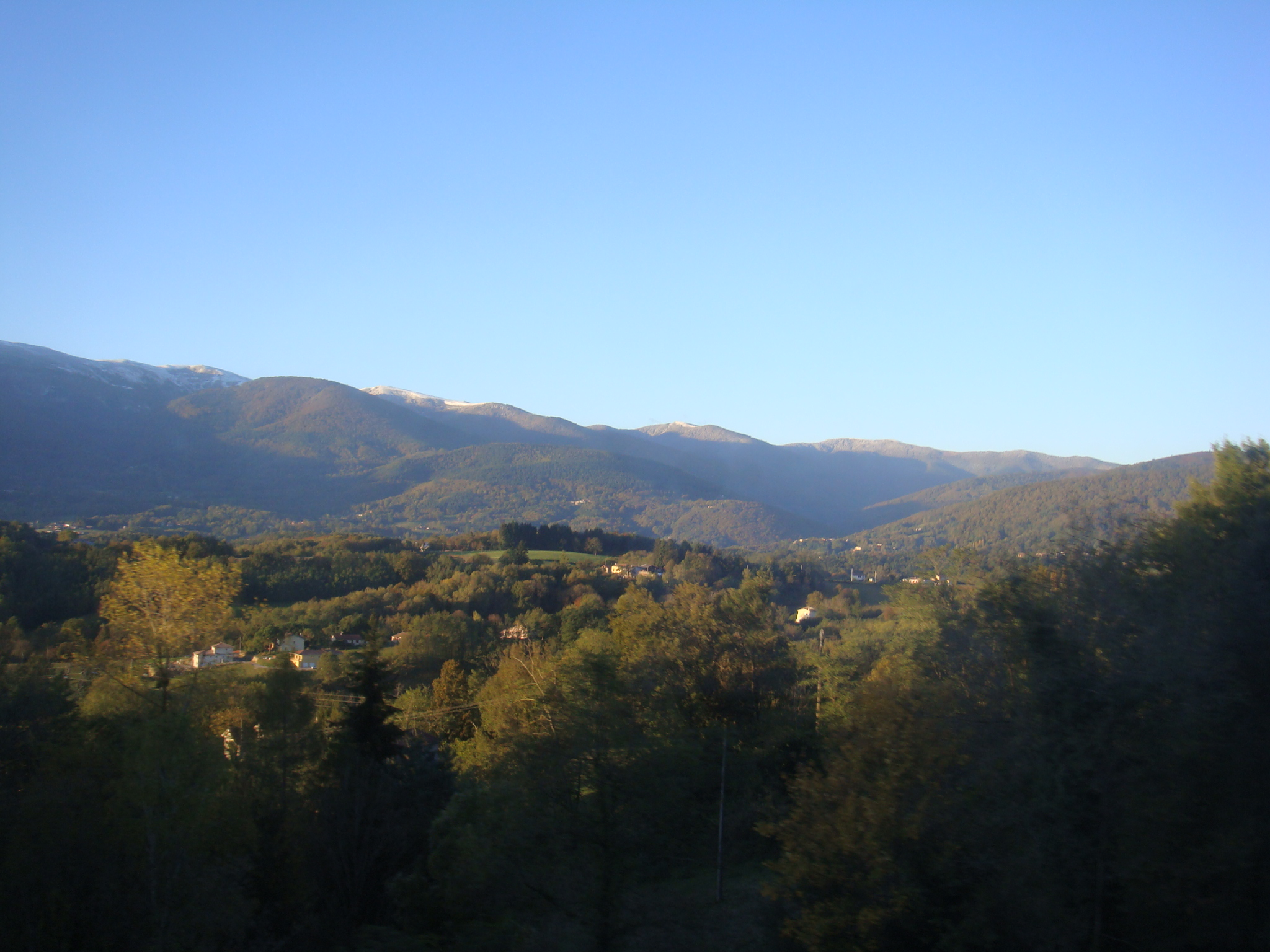
- A general view of Saint-Martin-de-Caralp
- Location of Saint-Martin-de-Caralp
- Location within France Location within Occitanie
- Coordinates: 42°59′30″N 1°32′45″E
- Country: France
- Region: Occitania
- Department: Ariège
- Arrondissement: Foix
- Canton: Val d'Ariège
- Intercommunality: CA Pays Foix-Varilhes

Government
  - Mayor (2020–2026): Jean-Louis Pujol
- Area^{1}: 9.16 km^{2} (3.54 sq mi)
- Elevation: 599 m (1,965 ft)
- Highest elevation: 917 m (3,009 ft)
- Lowest elevation: 481 m (1,578 ft)
- Population (2023): 379
  - Density: 41.4/km^{2} (107/sq mi)
- Time zone: UTC+01:00 (CET)
  - Summer (DST): UTC+02:00 (CEST)
- INSEE/Postal code: 09269 /09000
- ^{1} French Land Register data, which excludes lakes, ponds, glaciers > 1 km^{2} (0.386 sq mi or 247 acres) and river estuaries.

Saint-Martin-de-Caralp (Languedocien: Sent Martin de Caralp) is a commune in the Ariège department in southwestern France.

== Population ==
Inhabitants of Saint-Martin-de-Caralp are called Saint-Martinois in French.

Historical population
Year	Pop.	±% p.a.
1968	194	—
1975	218	+1.68%
1982	212	−0.40%
1990	242	+1.67%
1999	288	+1.95%
2007	342	+2.17%
2012	349	+0.41%
2017	357	+0.45%
2023	379	+1.00%
Source: INSEE

== See also ==
- Communes of the Ariège department
