= Loubières =

Commune in Occitanie, France

- Commune
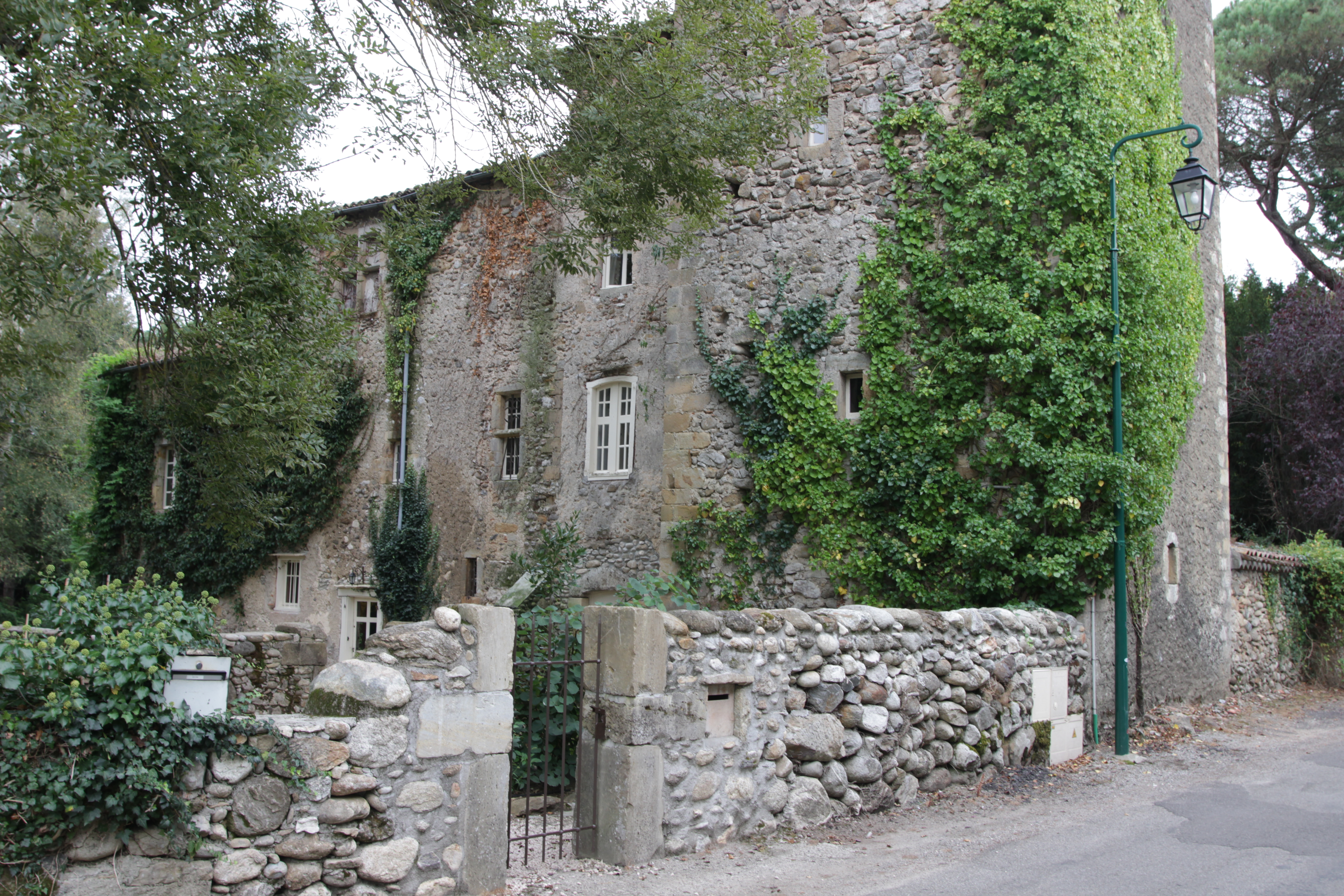
- The chateau in Loubières
- Location of Loubières
- Location within France Location within Occitanie
- Coordinates: 43°00′37″N 1°36′03″E
- Country: France
- Region: Occitania
- Department: Ariège
- Arrondissement: Foix
- Canton: Val d'Ariège
- Intercommunality: CA Pays Foix-Varilhes

Government
  - Mayor (2020–2026): Denis Belard
- Area^{1}: 2.9 km^{2} (1.1 sq mi)
- Elevation: 350 m (1,150 ft)
- Highest elevation: 569 m (1,867 ft)
- Lowest elevation: 355 m (1,165 ft)
- Population (2023): 359
  - Density: 120/km^{2} (320/sq mi)
- Time zone: UTC+01:00 (CET)
  - Summer (DST): UTC+02:00 (CEST)
- INSEE/Postal code: 09174 /09000
- ^{1} French Land Register data, which excludes lakes, ponds, glaciers > 1 km^{2} (0.386 sq mi or 247 acres) and river estuaries.

Loubières (French pronunciation: [lubjɛʁ]; Occitan: Lobièras) is a commune in the Ariège department in southwestern France.

== Population ==
Historical population
Year	Pop.	±% p.a.
1968	93	—
1975	118	+3.46%
1982	158	+4.26%
1990	185	+1.99%
1999	201	+0.93%
2007	209	+0.49%
2012	274	+5.57%
2017	337	+4.23%
2023	359	+1.06%
Source: INSEE

== See also ==
- Communes of the Ariège department
