= L'Herm =

Commune in Occitanie, France

- Commune
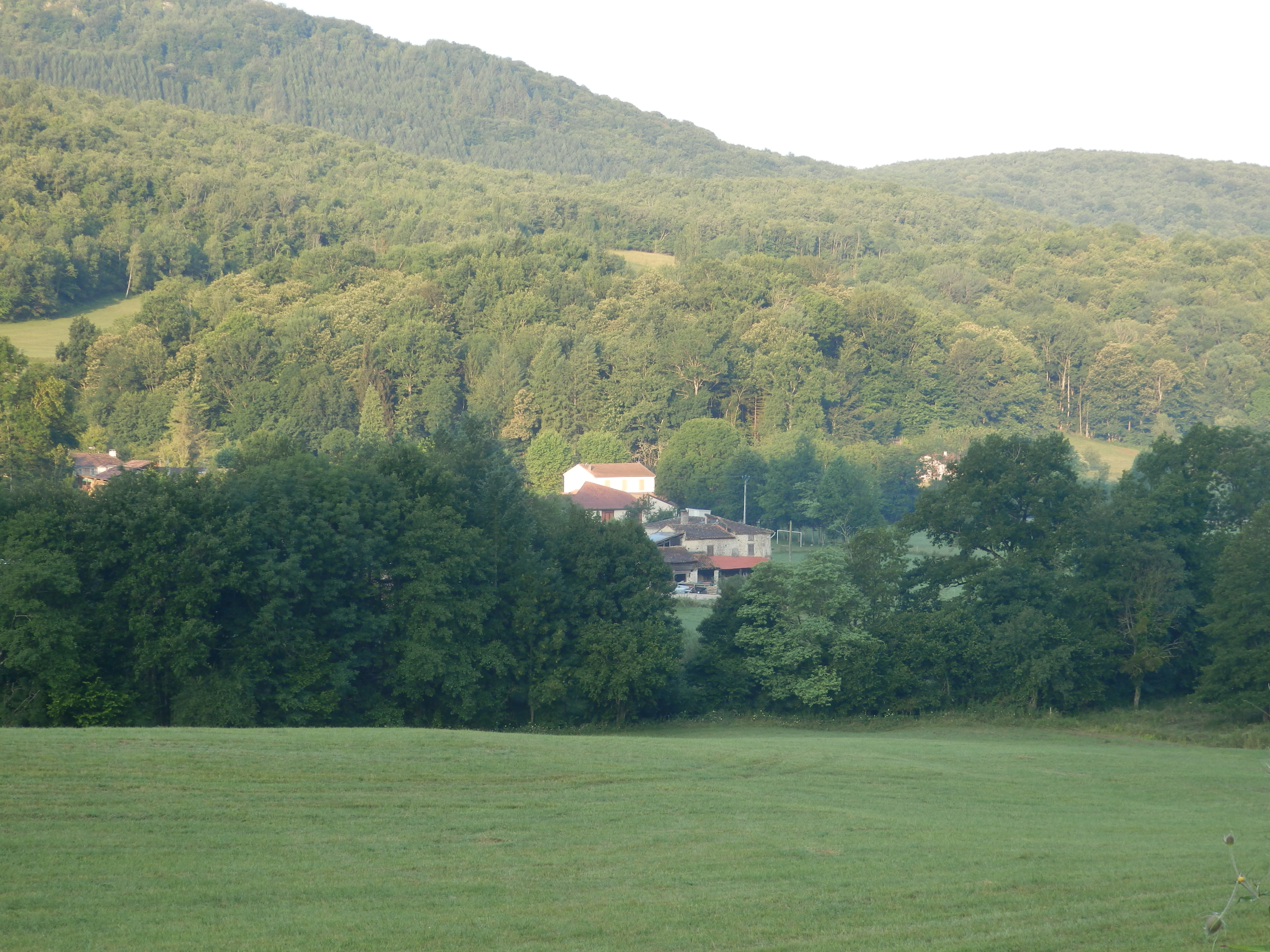
- Location of L'Herm
- Location within France Location within Occitanie
- Coordinates: 42°58′24″N 1°41′13″E
- Country: France
- Region: Occitania
- Department: Ariège
- Arrondissement: Foix
- Canton: Val d'Ariège
- Intercommunality: CA Pays Foix-Varilhes

Government
  - Mayor (2020–2026): Jean-Claude Serres
- Area^{1}: 14.67 km^{2} (5.66 sq mi)
- Elevation: 508 m (1,667 ft)
- Highest elevation: 960 m (3,150 ft)
- Lowest elevation: 411 m (1,348 ft)
- Population (2023): 186
  - Density: 12.7/km^{2} (32.8/sq mi)
- Time zone: UTC+01:00 (CET)
  - Summer (DST): UTC+02:00 (CEST)
- INSEE/Postal code: 09138 /09000
- ^{1} French Land Register data, which excludes lakes, ponds, glaciers > 1 km^{2} (0.386 sq mi or 247 acres) and river estuaries.

L'Herm (French pronunciation: [lɛʁm]; Occitan: L'Èrm) is a commune in the Ariège department in southwestern France.

== Population ==
Historical population
Year	Pop.	±% p.a.
1968	107	—
1975	115	+1.04%
1982	137	+2.53%
1990	170	+2.73%
1999	177	+0.45%
2007	176	−0.07%
2012	223	+4.85%
2017	201	−2.06%
2023	186	−1.28%
Source: INSEE

== See also ==
- Communes of the Ariège department
