= Le Bosc, Ariège =

Commune in Occitanie, France

Le Bosc
- Commune
- Location of Le Bosc
- Location within France Location within Occitanie
- Coordinates: 42°56′52″N 1°27′36″E
- Country: France
- Region: Occitania
- Department: Ariège
- Arrondissement: Foix
- Canton: Val d'Ariège
- Intercommunality: CA Pays Foix-Varilhes

Government
  - Mayor (2020–2026): Nathalie Rodriguez
- Area^{1}: 25.57 km^{2} (9.87 sq mi)
- Elevation: 700 m (2,300 ft)
- Highest elevation: 1,668 m (5,472 ft)
- Lowest elevation: 634 m (2,080 ft)
- Population (2023): 113
  - Density: 4.42/km^{2} (11.4/sq mi)
- Time zone: UTC+01:00 (CET)
  - Summer (DST): UTC+02:00 (CEST)
- INSEE/Postal code: 09063 /09000
- ^{1} French Land Register data, which excludes lakes, ponds, glaciers > 1 km^{2} (0.386 sq mi or 247 acres) and river estuaries.

Le Bosc (French pronunciation: [lə bɔsk]; Occitan: Le Bòsc) is a commune in the Ariège department of southwestern France.

== Population ==
Historical population
Year	Pop.	±% p.a.
1968	104	—
1975	122	+2.31%
1982	94	−3.66%
1990	115	+2.55%
1999	136	+1.88%
2007	104	−3.30%
2012	106	+0.38%
2017	97	−1.76%
2023	113	+2.58%
Source: INSEE

Inhabitants of Le Bosc are called Boscéens in French.

== See also ==
- Communes of the Ariège department
