= Dalou, Ariège =

Commune in Occitanie, France

Dalou
- Commune
- Coat of arms
- Location of Dalou
- Location within France Location within Occitanie
- Coordinates: 43°02′04″N 1°38′33″E
- Country: France
- Region: Occitania
- Department: Ariège
- Arrondissement: Foix
- Canton: Val d'Ariège
- Intercommunality: CA Pays Foix-Varilhes

Government
  - Mayor (2023–2026): Véronique Mangematin
- Area^{1}: 7.66 km^{2} (2.96 sq mi)
- Elevation: 339 m (1,112 ft)
- Highest elevation: 643 m (2,110 ft)
- Lowest elevation: 337 m (1,106 ft)
- Population (2023): 775
  - Density: 101/km^{2} (262/sq mi)
- Time zone: UTC+01:00 (CET)
  - Summer (DST): UTC+02:00 (CEST)
- INSEE/Postal code: 09104 /09120
- ^{1} French Land Register data, which excludes lakes, ponds, glaciers > 1 km^{2} (0.386 sq mi or 247 acres) and river estuaries.

Dalou (French pronunciation: [dalu]; Occitan: Dalon) is a commune in the Ariège department in southwestern France.

== Population ==
Historical population
| Year | Pop. | ±% p.a. |
|---|---|---|
| 1968 | 369 | — |
| 1975 | 393 | +0.90% |
| 1982 | 375 | −0.67% |
| 1990 | 442 | +2.08% |
| 1999 | 637 | +4.14% |
| 2007 | 795 | +2.81% |
| 2012 | 753 | −1.08% |
| 2017 | 772 | +0.50% |
| 2023 | 775 | +0.06% |
Source: INSEE

== See also ==
- Communes of the Ariège department
