= Joseph Delteil (speleologist) =

- Born: 21 March 1909; Soula, Ariège
- Died: 7 November 1979 (aged 70); Foix in Ariège
- Occupation(s): Speleologist; Caver

Joseph Delteil (21 March 1909 – 7 November 1979) was a French speleologist.

Delteil trained as a carpenter before turning to speleology. In 1935, he participated in the exploration of the Labouiche underground river, revealing 3800 metres of active network. In 1943 and in 1946-47, he also participated alongside Marcel Loubens and Norbert Casteret in the exploration of the abyss of Henne Morte.

His name is given to the 130 metre deep shaft located at the bottom of the "gouffre Raymonde", the major chasm of the réseau Félix Trombe.
