= Brassac, Ariège =

Commune in Occitanie, France

Brassac
- Commune
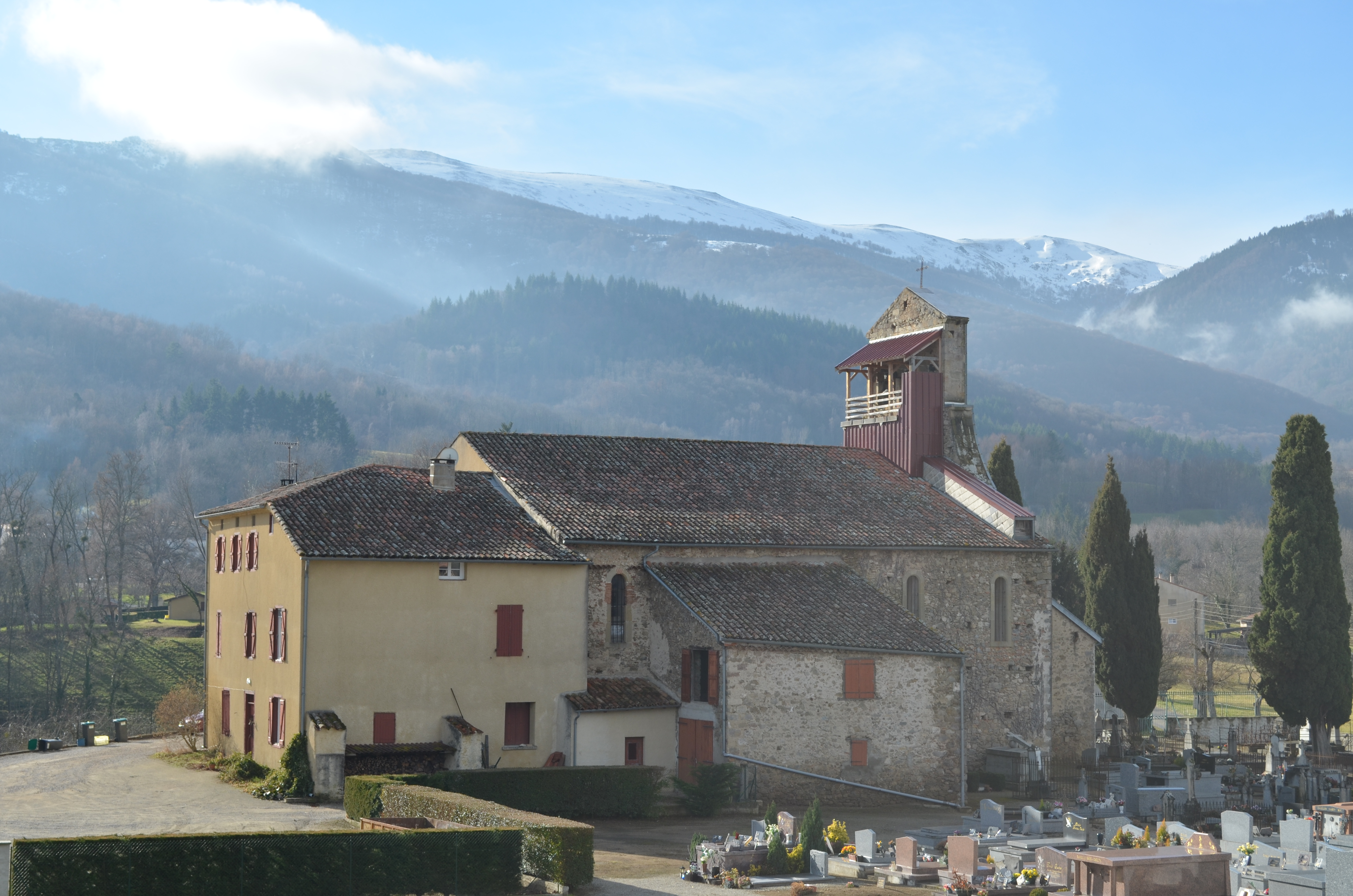
- The church in Brassac
- Location of Brassac
- Location within France Location within Occitanie
- Coordinates: 42°56′49″N 1°32′17″E
- Country: France
- Region: Occitania
- Department: Ariège
- Arrondissement: Foix
- Canton: Val d'Ariège
- Intercommunality: CA Pays Foix-Varilhes

Government
  - Mayor (2022–2026): Laurence Degraves
- Area^{1}: 24.33 km^{2} (9.39 sq mi)
- Elevation: 550 m (1,800 ft)
- Highest elevation: 1,695 m (5,561 ft)
- Lowest elevation: 447 m (1,467 ft)
- Population (2023): 633
  - Density: 26.0/km^{2} (67.4/sq mi)
- Time zone: UTC+01:00 (CET)
  - Summer (DST): UTC+02:00 (CEST)
- INSEE/Postal code: 09066 /09000
- ^{1} French Land Register data, which excludes lakes, ponds, glaciers > 1 km^{2} (0.386 sq mi or 247 acres) and river estuaries.

Brassac (French pronunciation: [bʁasak]; Occitan: Braçac) is a commune in the Ariège department of southwestern France.

== Population ==
Historical population
Year	Pop.	±% p.a.
1968	408	—
1975	339	−2.61%
1982	530	+6.59%
1990	555	+0.58%
1999	584	+0.57%
2007	612	+0.59%
2012	640	+0.90%
2017	632	−0.25%
2023	633	+0.03%
Source: INSEE

Inhabitants of Brassac are called Brassacois in French.

== See also ==
- Communes of the Ariège department
