= Montégut-Plantaurel =

Commune in Occitanie, France

- Commune
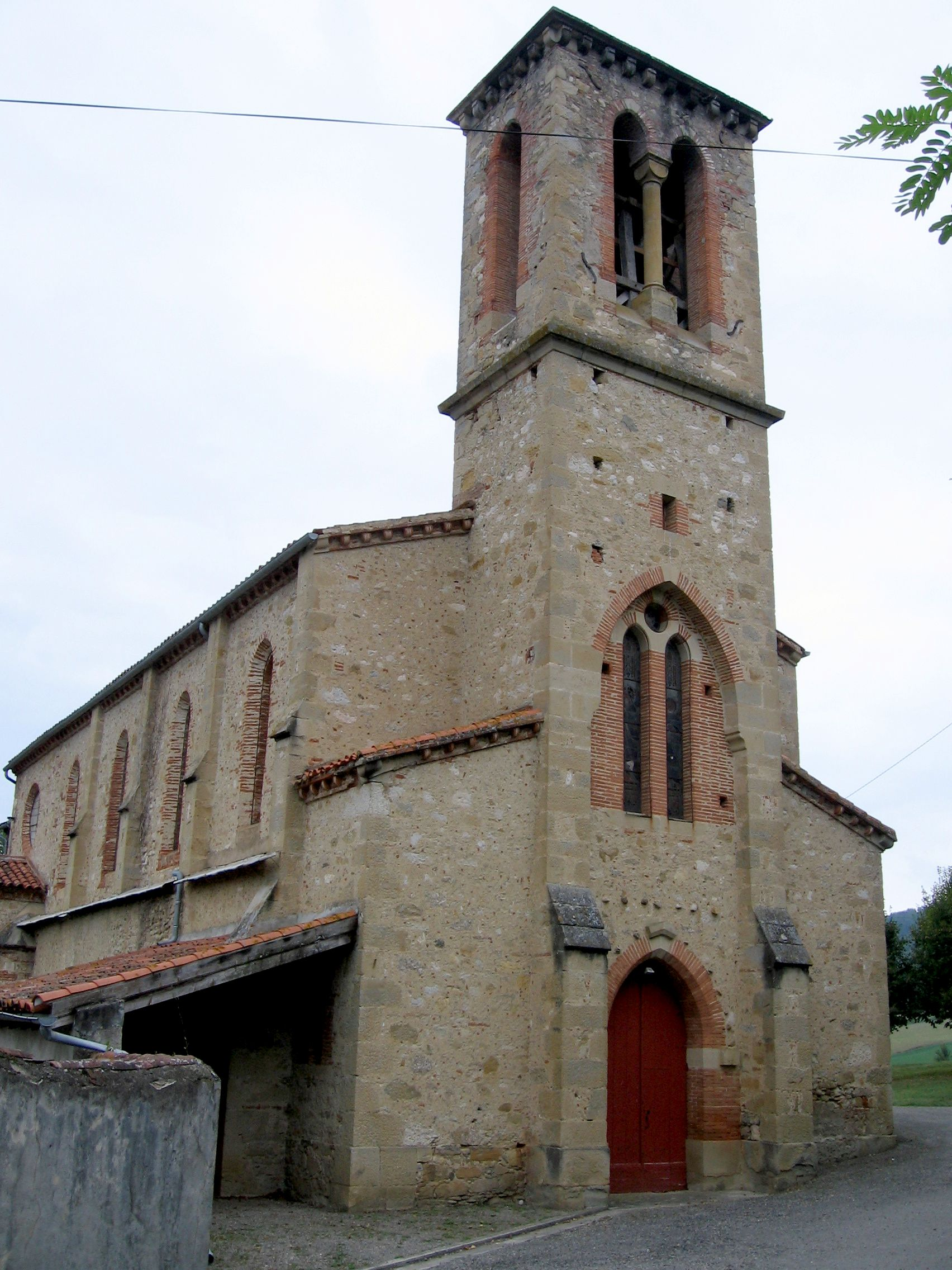
- The church in Montégut-Plantaurel
- Location of Montégut-Plantaurel
- Location within France Location within Occitanie
- Coordinates: 43°04′12″N 1°29′11″E
- Country: France
- Region: Occitania
- Department: Ariège
- Arrondissement: Foix
- Canton: Val d'Ariège
- Intercommunality: CA Pays Foix-Varilhes

Government
  - Mayor (2020–2026): Sylvie Estrade
- Area^{1}: 18.95 km^{2} (7.32 sq mi)
- Elevation: 325 m (1,066 ft)
- Highest elevation: 630 m (2,070 ft)
- Lowest elevation: 307 m (1,007 ft)
- Population (2023): 311
  - Density: 16.4/km^{2} (42.5/sq mi)
- Time zone: UTC+01:00 (CET)
  - Summer (DST): UTC+02:00 (CEST)
- INSEE/Postal code: 09202 /09120
- ^{1} French Land Register data, which excludes lakes, ponds, glaciers > 1 km^{2} (0.386 sq mi or 247 acres) and river estuaries.

Montégut-Plantaurel (French pronunciation: [mɔ̃tɛɡy plɑ̃toʁɛl]; Occitan: Montagut de Plantaurèl) is a commune in the Ariège department in southwestern France.

== Geography ==
The Lèze flows through the northwestern part of the commune.

== History ==
The Chateau de La Hille, was home to Jewish refugee children supported by Œuvre de secours aux enfants during the early 1940s.

== Population ==
Historical population
Year	Pop.	±% p.a.
1968	210	—
1975	171	−2.89%
1982	179	+0.66%
1990	253	+4.42%
1999	267	+0.60%
2007	316	+2.13%
2012	334	+1.11%
2017	335	+0.06%
2023	311	−1.23%
Source: INSEE

== See also ==
- Communes of the Ariège department
