= Canari noir =

Variety of grape

Canari noir (French pronunciation: [kanaʁi nwaʁ]) is a red French wine grape variety that has been historically grown in the Ariège department in the foothills of the French Pyrénées. However DNA profiling in 2001 showed that plantings of a grape called Gamay Luverdon growing in the Italian wine region of Piedmont were in fact plantings of Canari noir. Across the Pyrénées in Spain, the grape variety known as Batista was also found to be identical to Canari noir. Like Pinot noir and Grenache, Canari noir has color mutations known as Canari blanc and Canari gris.

== History ==
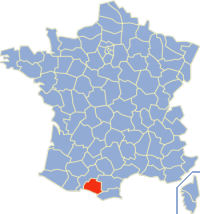
The Ariège department where Canari noir has been historically grown.

Canari noir has a long history of being grown in the Ariège and Haute-Garonne departments in the shadows of the Pyrénées mountains but recent DNA evidence have led ampelographers to speculate that the grape was once more widely grown across the border into Spain and perhaps eastward throughout southern France and across the Alps into Italy. This is because grape varieties grown in Spain (Batista) and the Val Chisone and Susa Valley (Gamay Luverdon) in Piedmont, Italy were found by DNA profiling to be the same variety as Canari noir.

Today the grape is nearly extinct with only a few scattered plantings throughout Ariège and at the conservation vineyard of Les Vignerons Ariégeois in Montégut-Plantaurel where growers hope to turn experimental plantings into commercial wine production.

== Viticulture ==
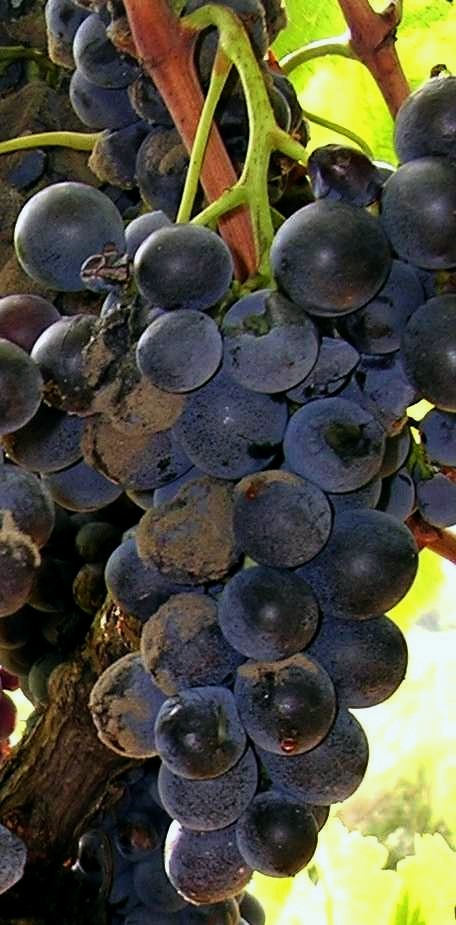
While infection of Botrytis cinerea can be welcomed in some white grape varieties, in red wine grapes such as Canari noir it contributes to the viticultural hazard of botrytis bunch rot (pictured).

Canari noir is a mid-late ripening variety that can be very vigorous and high yielding. Its main viticultural hazard is its susceptible to botrytis bunch rot.

Similar to the relationship between Pinot noir/Pinot blanc and Grenache/Grenache blanc, Canari noir has two color mutations, Canari blanc and Canari gris. However unlike the Pinot and Grenache varieties, the other Canari grapes are rarely seen and not currently used in commercial wine production.

== Synonyms and confusion with other varieties ==
Over the years Canari noir has been known under a variety of synonyms including: Balza, Batista (in Spain), Blanchette rouge, Blanquette rouge, Boudales, Bourgogne, Caillaba, Canari, Canaril, Canarill (in the Ariège and Haute-Garonne departments), Carcasses, Carcassès (in Ariège), Cargo nalt, Cargonalt, Chalosse noire, Cot a Queue verte, Cot vert du Saumurois, Cotes Vertes, Enfin, Errone de Grolleau, Esquisse Braguette, Folle noir de la Viene, Folle noire, Gamay Luverdon (in the Val di Susa and Val Chisone region of Piedmont), Gamay de Malain, Gamay Malain, Grosse Negrette, Luverdon, Oeil de Chope, Œil de Chope, Ondane, Ondenc noir, Pinot gris, Pinot Gris Mendoza, Saint Helene, Sainte-Helene, Semis rouge, Ugne noir and Ugne noire.

Synonyms for Canari blanc include: Bellecital, Caillaba and Cailleba. Canari gris has no known synonyms recognized by the Vitis International Variety Catalogue (VIVC) maintained by the Geilweilerhof Institute for Grape Breeding.

Canari noir several synonyms with the Malbec grape known as Côt in Southwest France and associated with the wines of Bordeaux and Cahors. However, despite often being confused for each other there is no known relationship between the two grape varieties.
