= Vernajoul =

Commune in Occitanie, France

- Commune
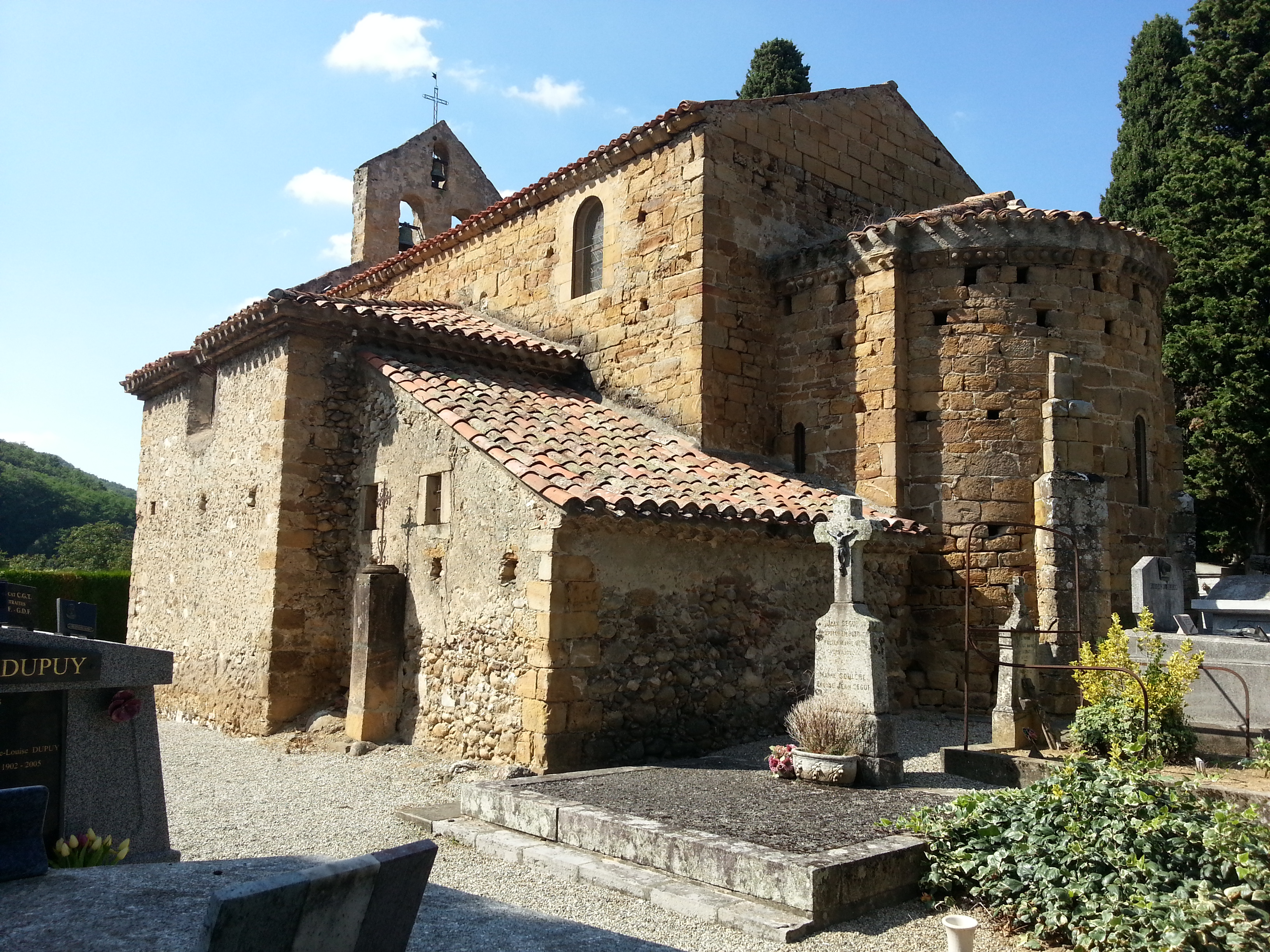
- The church in Vernajoul

- Coat of arms
- Location of Vernajoul
- Location within France Location within Occitanie
- Coordinates: 42°59′15″N 1°36′27″E
- Country: France
- Region: Occitania
- Department: Ariège
- Arrondissement: Foix
- Canton: Val d'Ariège
- Intercommunality: CA Pays Foix-Varilhes

Government
  - Mayor (2020–2026): Jean-Paul Ferré
- Area^{1}: 9.08 km^{2} (3.51 sq mi)
- Elevation: 414 m (1,358 ft)
- Highest elevation: 724 m (2,375 ft)
- Lowest elevation: 359 m (1,178 ft)
- Population (2023): 701
  - Density: 77.2/km^{2} (200/sq mi)
- Time zone: UTC+01:00 (CET)
  - Summer (DST): UTC+02:00 (CEST)
- INSEE/Postal code: 09329 /09000
- ^{1} French Land Register data, which excludes lakes, ponds, glaciers > 1 km^{2} (0.386 sq mi or 247 acres) and river estuaries.

Vernajoul (French pronunciation: [vɛʁnaʒul]; Occitan: Vernajol) is a commune in the Ariège department in southwestern France.

== Population ==
Inhabitants of Vernajoul are called Vernajoulois in French.

Historical population
Year	Pop.	±% p.a.
1968	429	—
1975	516	+2.67%
1982	546	+0.81%
1990	541	−0.11%
1999	574	+0.66%
2007	697	+2.46%
2012	679	−0.52%
2017	654	−0.75%
2023	701	+1.16%
Source: INSEE

== See also ==
- Communes of the Ariège department
