= Loubens, Ariège =

Commune in Occitanie, France

Loubens
- Commune
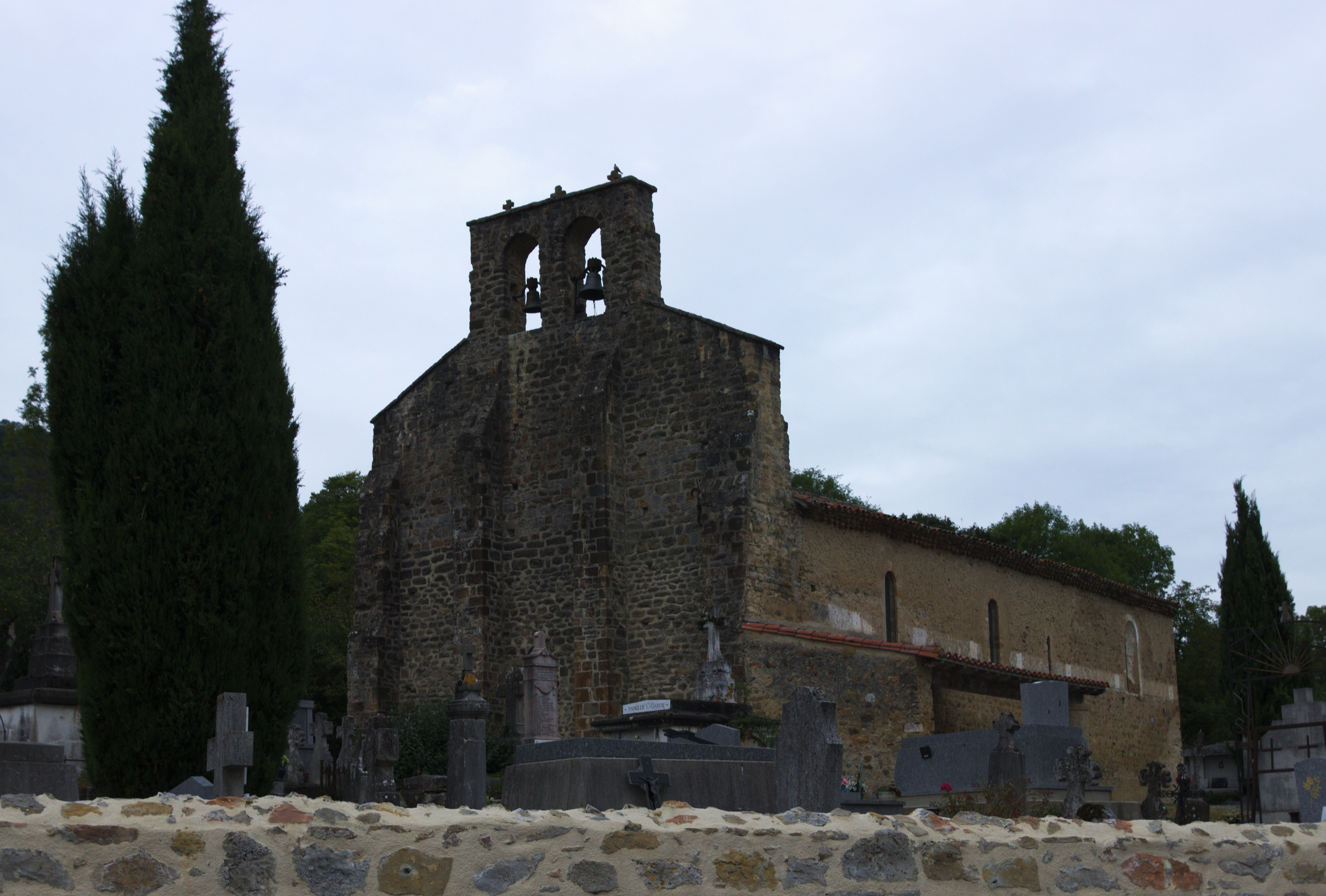
- The church in Loubens
- Location of Loubens
- Location within France Location within Occitanie
- Coordinates: 43°02′46″N 1°32′47″E
- Country: France
- Region: Occitania
- Department: Ariège
- Arrondissement: Foix
- Canton: Val d'Ariège
- Intercommunality: CA Pays Foix-Varilhes

Government
  - Mayor (2020–2026): Régis Lassus
- Area^{1}: 11.73 km^{2} (4.53 sq mi)
- Elevation: 420 m (1,380 ft)
- Highest elevation: 702 m (2,303 ft)
- Lowest elevation: 382 m (1,253 ft)
- Population (2023): 267
  - Density: 22.8/km^{2} (59.0/sq mi)
- Time zone: UTC+01:00 (CET)
  - Summer (DST): UTC+02:00 (CEST)
- INSEE/Postal code: 09173 /09120
- ^{1} French Land Register data, which excludes lakes, ponds, glaciers > 1 km^{2} (0.386 sq mi or 247 acres) and river estuaries.

Loubens (French pronunciation: [lubɛ̃s]; Occitan: Lobenç) is a commune in the Ariège department in southwestern France.

== Population ==
Historical population
Year	Pop.	±% p.a.
1968	189	—
1975	150	−3.25%
1982	151	+0.09%
1990	183	+2.43%
1999	200	+0.99%
2007	248	+2.73%
2012	256	+0.64%
2017	274	+1.37%
2023	267	−0.43%
Source: INSEE

== See also ==
- Communes of the Ariège department
