= Adolphe Garrigou =

French industrialist, politician, journalist, writer

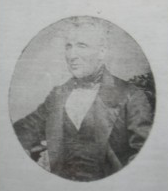
- Born: January 10, 1802; Tarascon-sur-Ariège, France
- Died: August 23, 1893 (aged 91); Tarascon-sur-Ariège, France
- Occupations: Historian, speleologist
- Children: Félix Garrigou

Adolphe Garrigou (January 10, 1802, in Tarascon-sur-Ariège, France – August 23, 1893, Tarascon-sur-Ariège, France) was a French industrialist, politician, journalist, and writer, particularly renowned for his contributions to the field of archaeology.

== Biography ==
Born in 1802 in Tarascon-sur-Ariège, into a republican family with involvement in the 1789 Revolution, Adolphe Garrigou joined the secret society of the Carbonari around 1819. Inducted in 1822 into the Lombrives cave, he rose to lead the faction known as Les Compagnons du Sabarthez. The 1848 revolution elevated him to the position of mayor of Tarascon and then as administrator of the Ariège department. He founded the metallurgical factories Saint-Antoine in Saint-Paul-de-Jarrat, equipped with blast furnaces, providing significant resources to pursue his ventures.

Together with his brother-in-law, the polytechnician and historian Léo Lamarque (1808–1849), Adolphe Garrigou was the builder in 1836 of the "Pont du Diable" in Montoulieu. Léo Lamarque, who collaborated with the mathematician Jean-Victor Poncelet, experimented there with a hydraulic wheel of his invention. Adolphe Garrigou died in 1893. His library and archives were dispersed and lost. During his later years, he greatly influenced his young neighbor Antonin Gadal, who wrote his biography.

His son, Joseph Louis Félix Garrigou, born on September 16, 1835, in Tarascon-sur-Ariège, and deceased on March 18, 1920, was a physician, prehistorian, spelunker, and hydrologist. He continued some of his father's research, notably exploring the Lombrives cave.

== Archaeology ==
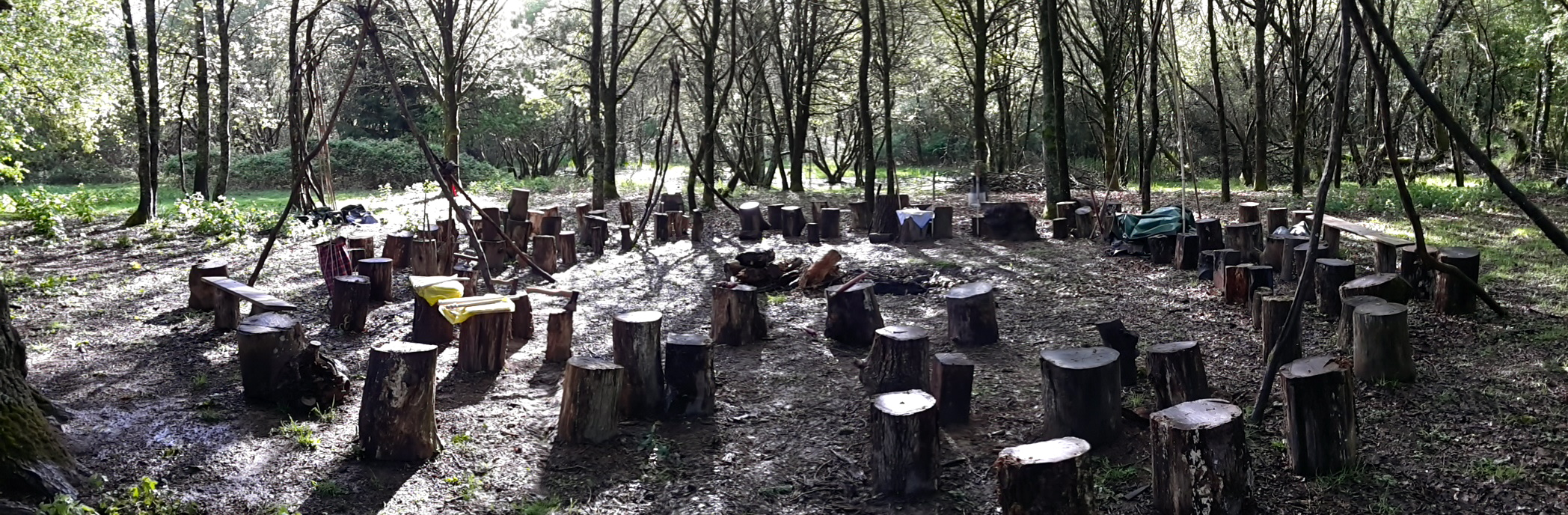
Forest Sales Circle

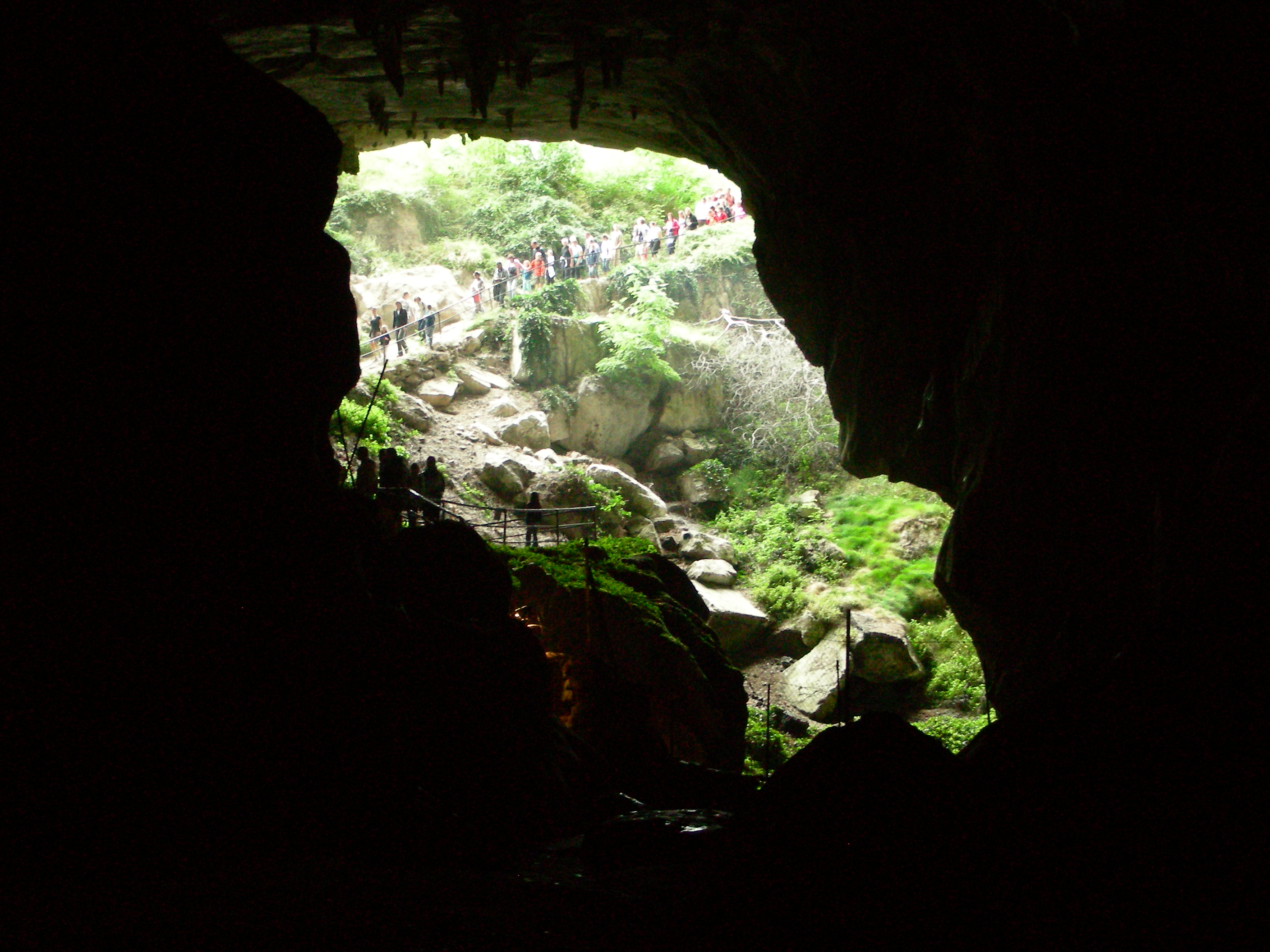
Lombrives

As a corresponding member of the Academy of sciences, he devoted himself to the prehistory and regional history of Ariège, particularly in connection with the Cathars. Alongside the departmental archivist Jean-François Rambaud, he initiated excavations at the Lombrives cave in 1822. The two men unearthed skulls and various bones arranged in a circle around an impressive stalagmitic formation known as Le Mammouth, spanning an arc of about a hundred meters.

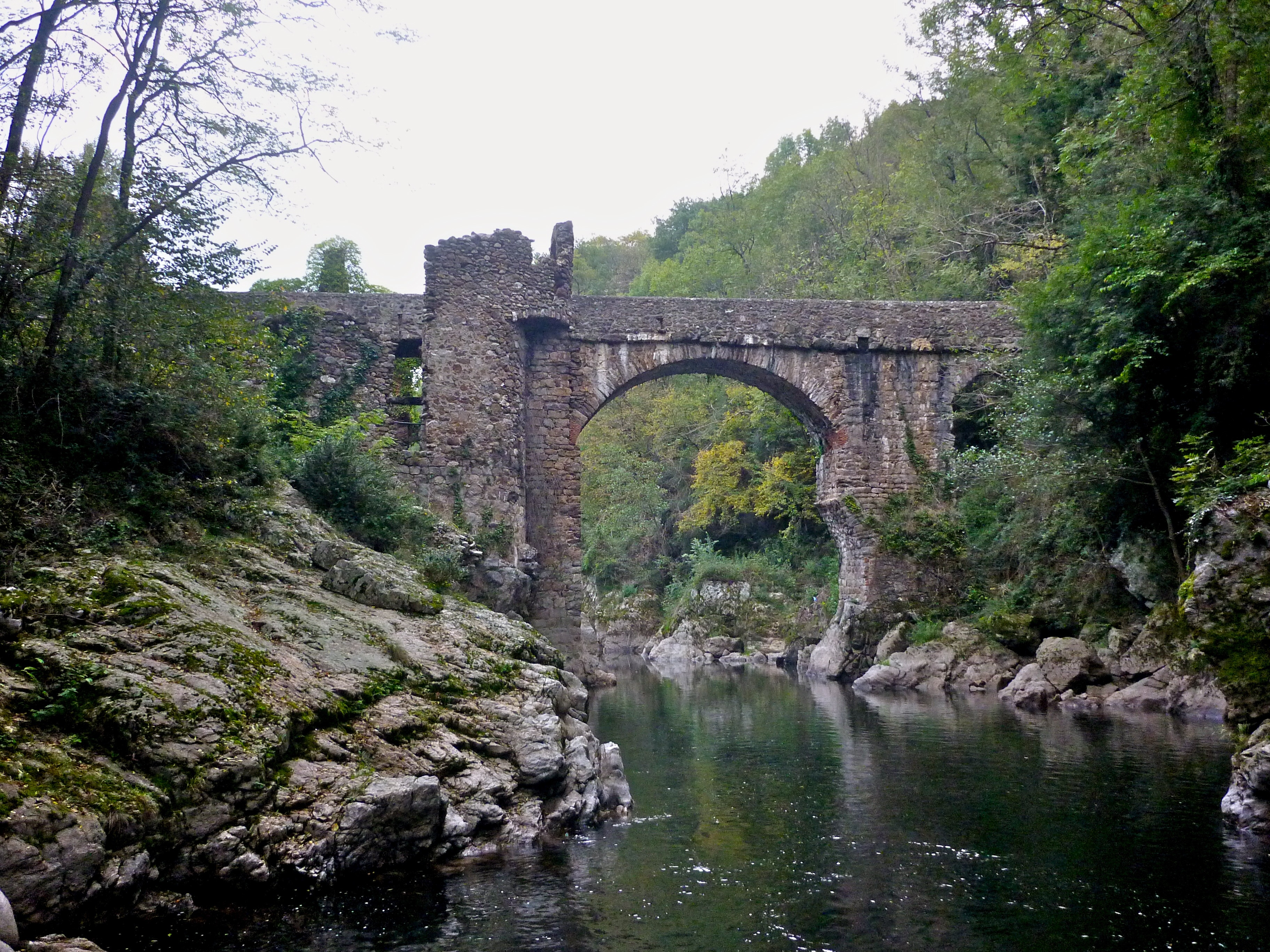
Pont du Diable

Adolphe Garrigou discovered, among a large quantity of graffiti, a discoidal stele engraved with a five-pointed star. He then engaged in exploring the caves of Ussat, Ornolac, and Bouan. His field research provided evidence that the Sabarthès mountains had indeed served as a refuge for the Cathars. In Ussat, within the cave called "Bethlehem," he found the pentagram engraved in the rock. Inside the Ornolac cave, he discovered a bronze plate depicting a relief sculpture of a dove, identical to those found later at Montségur.

Adolphe Garrigou sought to demonstrate the presence of the Sotiates, a mysterious Aquitainian people mentioned in the Gallic Wars, in Ariège. He became the honorary president of the Ariège Society of Sciences, Literature, and Arts from its foundation in 1882.

== Publications ==
Selected bibliography:

- Garrigou, Adolphe (1889). "78 ans avant l'ère chrétienne. Première campagne des Romains contre les Sotiates, Euskes ou Aquitains."
- Garrigou, Adolphe (1849). "Sabar. Histoire de l'église de Sabar... Documents inédits et des plus intéressants relatifs à cette église et à tout le haut pays de Foix, anciennement connu sous le nom de Sabartes. Par l'auteur des "Études historiques sur le pays de Foix et le Couseran."
- Garrigou, Adolphe (2010). "Études historiques sur l'ancien pays de Foix et le Couseran: [première partie de la période romaine] [les Sotiates du temps de César]." ISBN 978-2-7504-2604-0.
- Garrigou, Adolphe (1884). "Ibères, Ibérie : étude sur l'origine et les migrations de ces Ibères, premiers habitants connus de l'occident de l'Europe."
