= Axiat =

Commune in Occitanie, France

- Commune
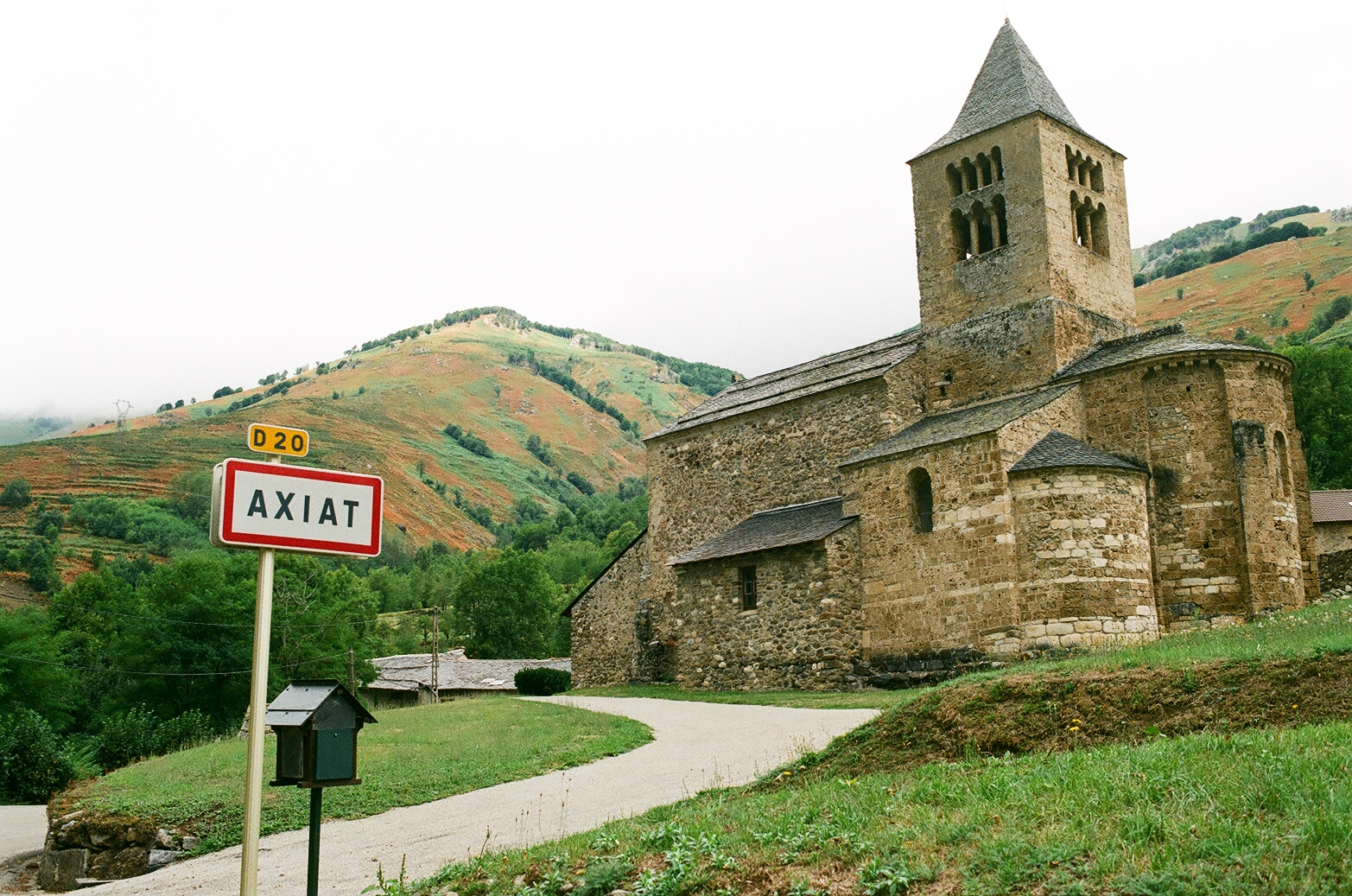
- The church in Axiat
- Location of Axiat
- Location within France Location within Occitanie
- Coordinates: 42°47′05″N 1°45′25″E
- Country: France
- Region: Occitania
- Department: Ariège
- Arrondissement: Foix
- Canton: Haute-Ariège
- Intercommunality: CC Haute-Ariège

Government
  - Mayor (2020–2026): Maurice Sicre
- Area^{1}: 9.54 km^{2} (3.68 sq mi)
- Elevation: 880 m (2,890 ft)
- Highest elevation: 2,365 m (7,759 ft)
- Lowest elevation: 707 m (2,320 ft)
- Population (2023): 33
  - Density: 3.5/km^{2} (9.0/sq mi)
- Time zone: UTC+01:00 (CET)
  - Summer (DST): UTC+02:00 (CEST)
- INSEE/Postal code: 09031 /09250
- ^{1} French Land Register data, which excludes lakes, ponds, glaciers > 1 km^{2} (0.386 sq mi or 247 acres) and river estuaries.

Axiat is a commune in the Ariège department in the Occitanie region of southwestern France.

== Geography ==
Axiat is located some 27 km south-east of Foix and some 12 km north-west of Ax-les-Thermes. Access to the commune is by the D20 road from Appy in the west which passes through the south of the commune and the village before continuing south to Lordat. The commune is alpine in nature with snow-capped mountains in the north, extensive forests, and rugged terrain. There is some farming activity in the south near the village.

The Ruisseau d'Axiat forms the southern border of the commune as it flows west to join the Ariege at Urs. The Ruisseau de la Cassagne forms the south-western border of the commune as it flows south to join the Ruisseau d'Axiat. The Ruisseau de Girabel forms the north-western border of the commune flows south to join the Ruisseau de la Cassagne. The Ruisseau de Sauquet rises north of the commune and flows south through the centre near the village and joins the Ruisseau d'Axiat on the southern border. The Ruisseau de Fontronne forms the eastern border of the commune as it flows south to join the Ruisseau d'Axiat on the southern border.

There is also a hamlet called Axiat in the commune of Miglos.

== Administration ==
List of Successive Mayors

From	To	Name
2001	2026	Maurice Sicre

== Demography ==
The inhabitants of the commune are known as Axiatois or Axiatoises in French.

Historical population

Year	Pop.	±% p.a.
1793	204	—
1821	277	+1.10%
1846	299	+0.31%
1872	244	−0.78%
1901	192	−0.82%
1926	136	−1.37%
1946	101	−1.48%
1962	81	−1.37%
1968	52	−7.12%

Year	Pop.	±% p.a.
1975	41	−3.34%
1982	48	+2.28%
1990	42	−1.66%
1999	35	−2.01%
2007	27	−3.19%
2012	35	+5.33%
2017	41	+3.22%
2023	33	−3.55%

Source: EHESS and INSEE

== Culture and heritage ==
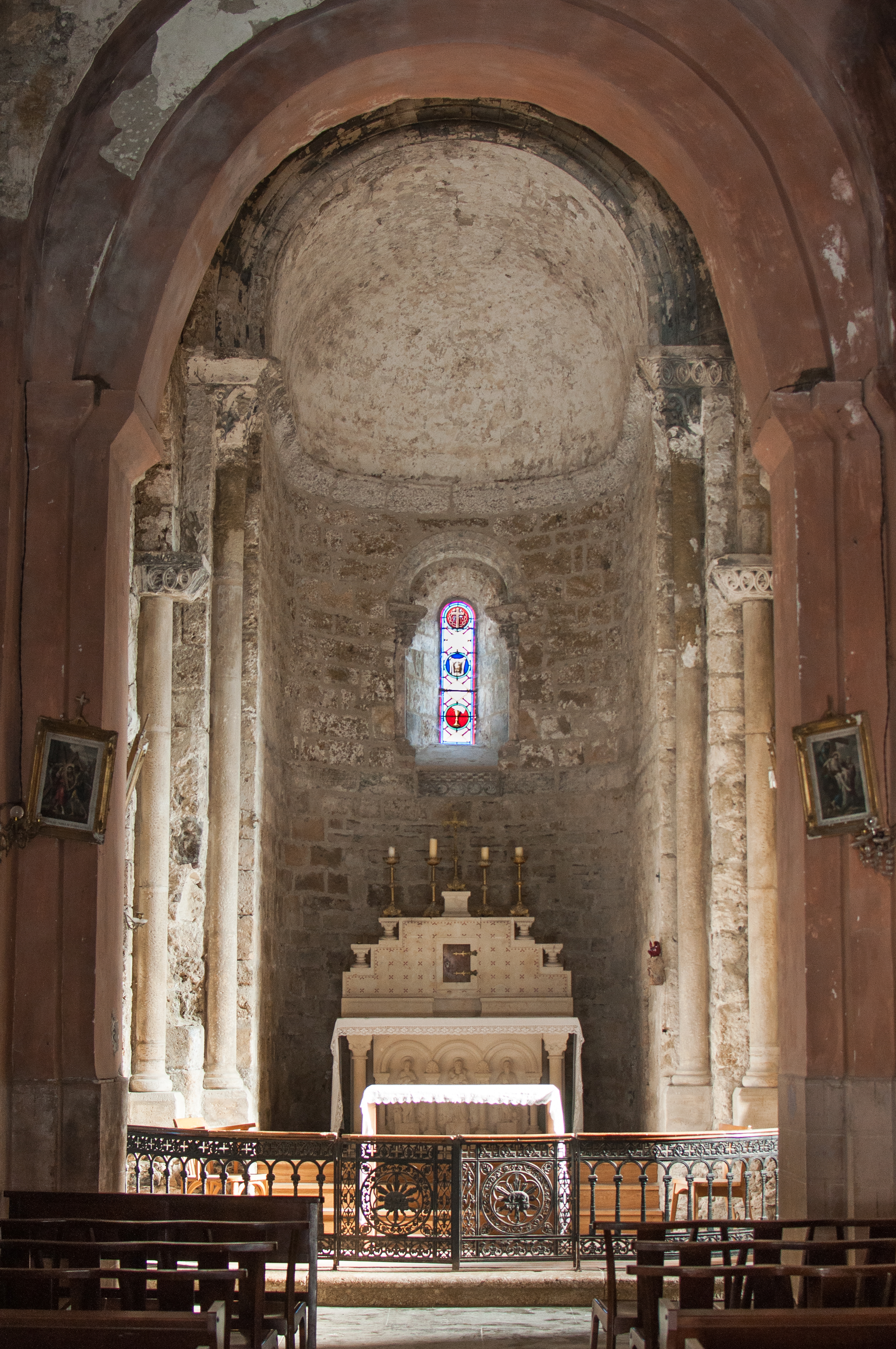
The Church Choir

=== Religious heritage ===
The Church of Saint Julien (11th century) is registered as an historical monument.

Photos of the Church

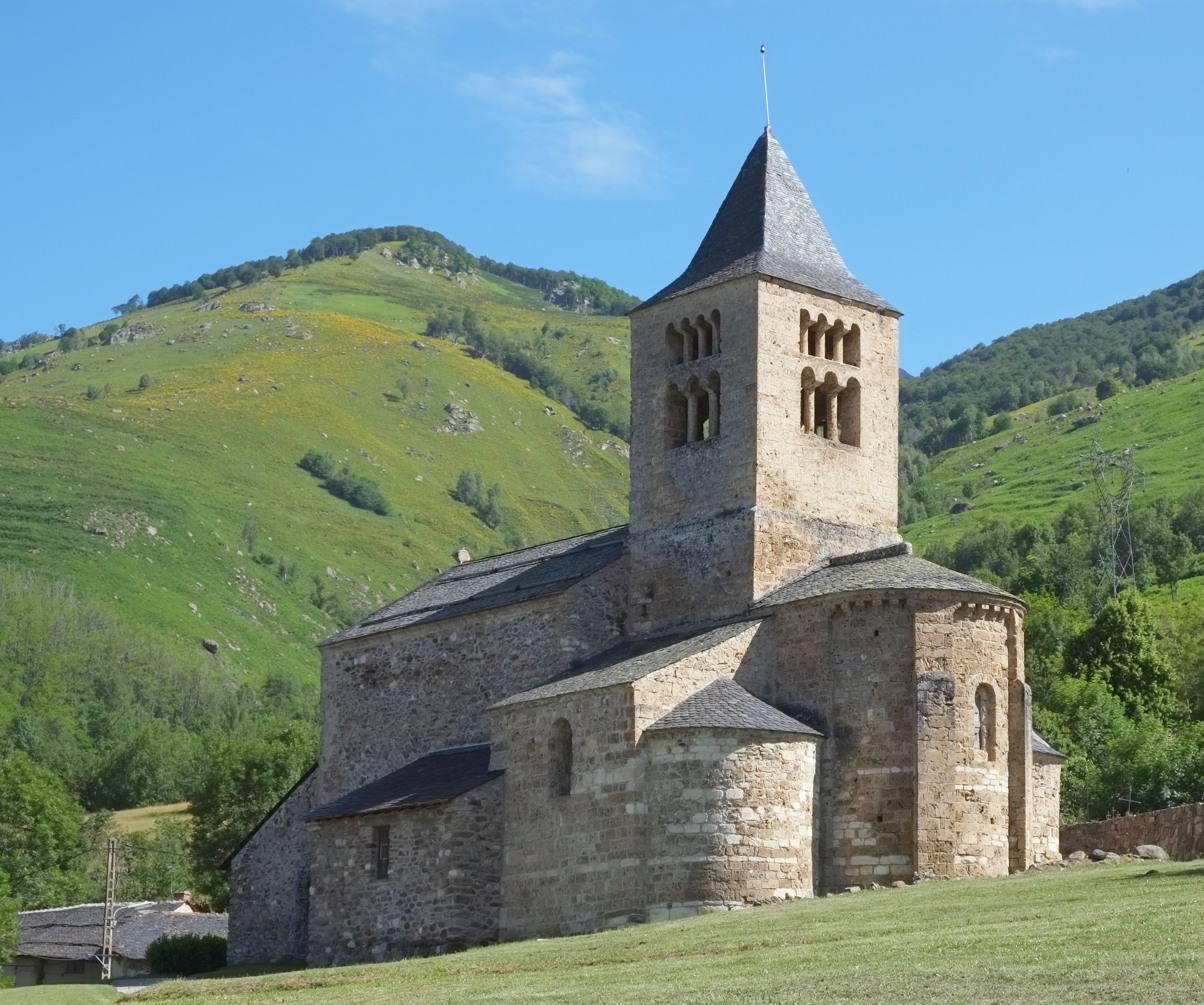
Exterior of the Church

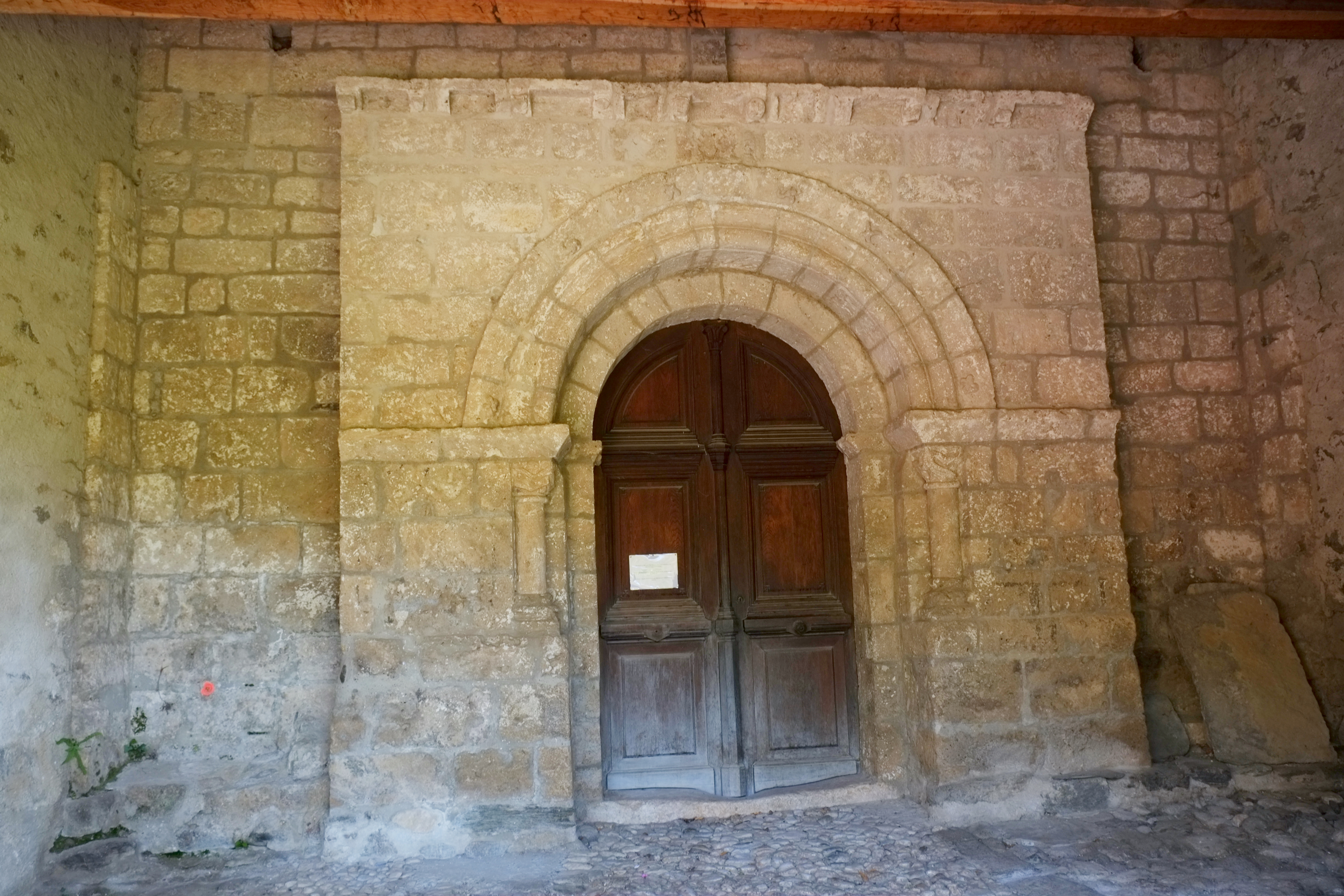
A door to the Church

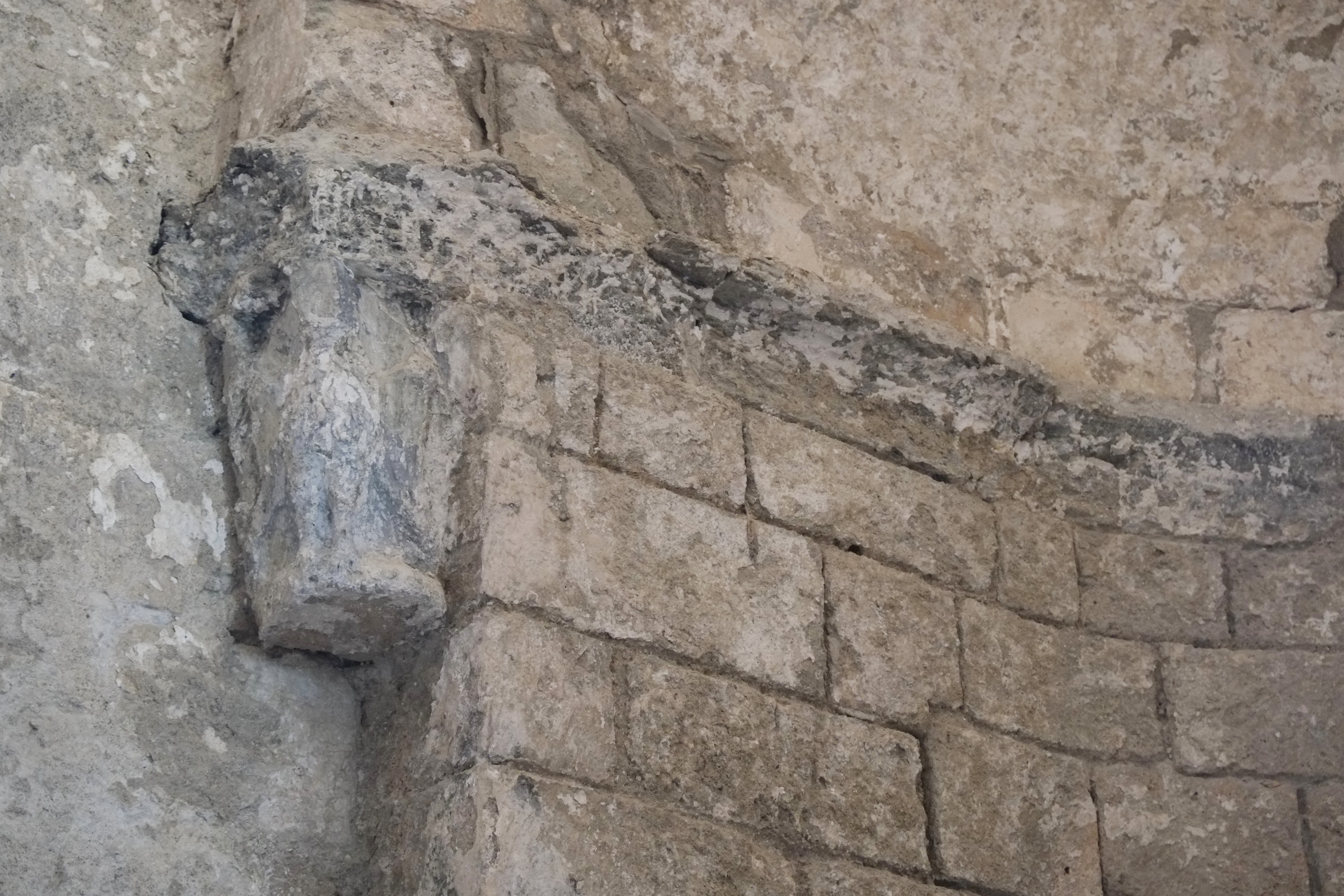
A detail of the wall

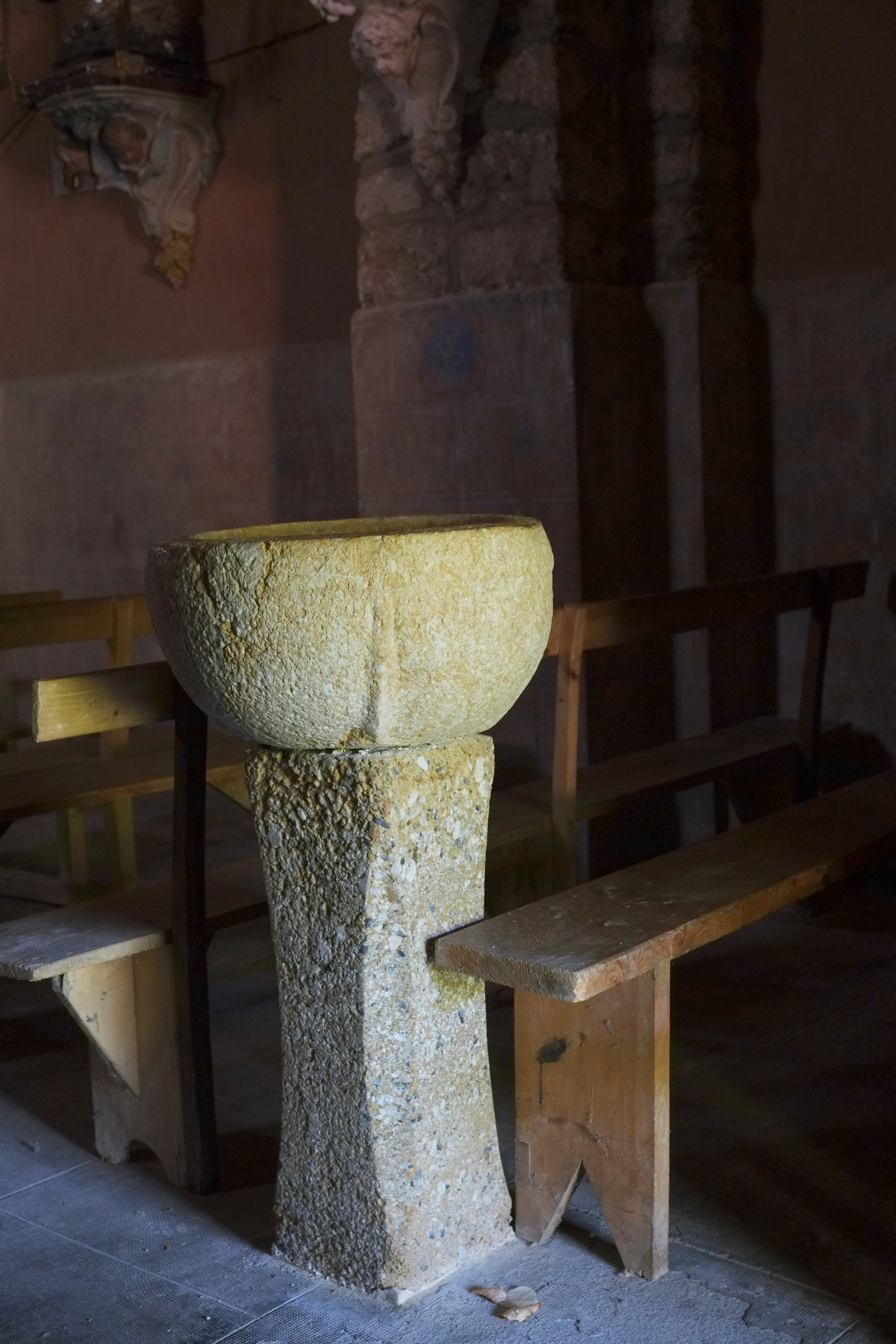
The Baptismal font

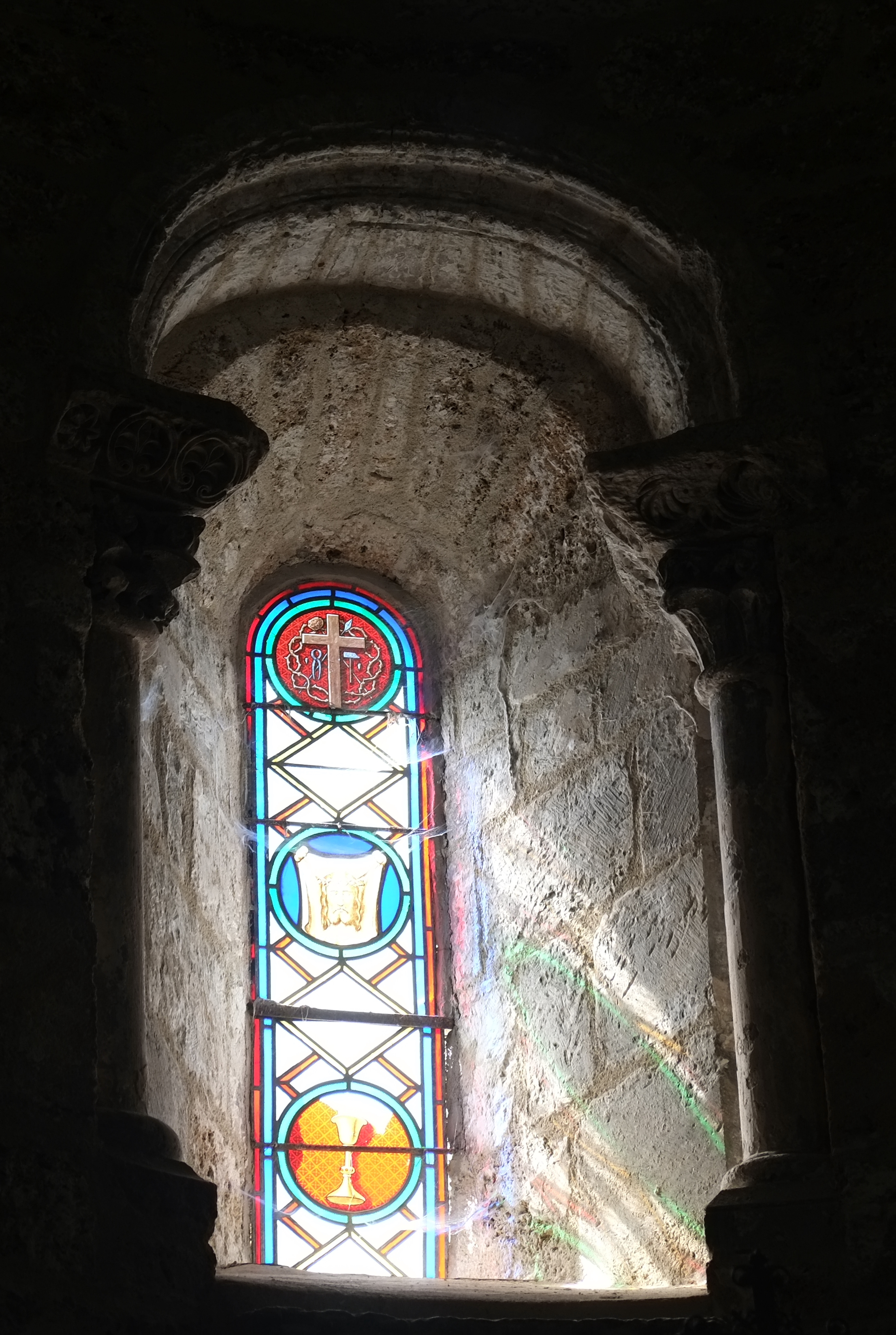
A Stained glass window

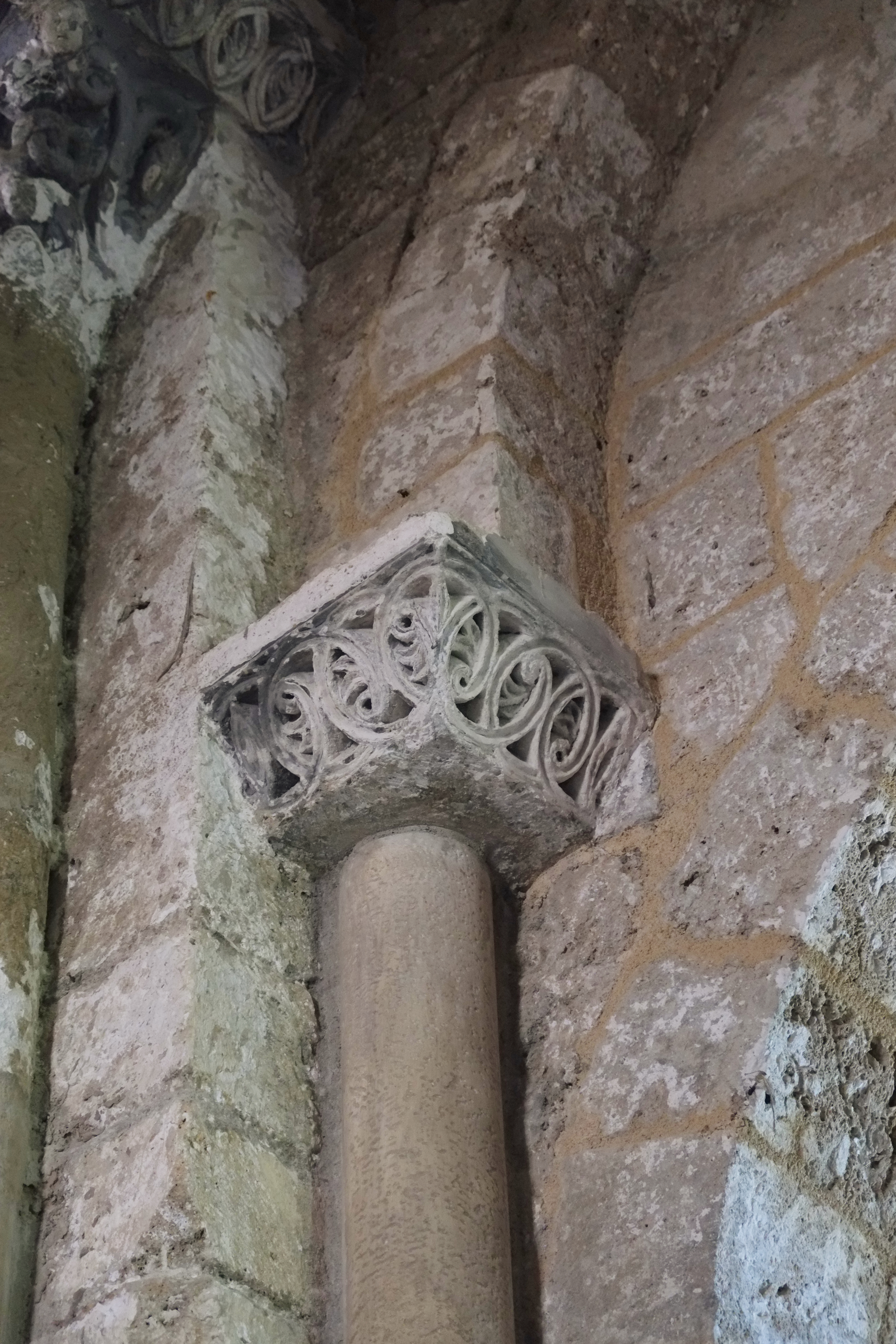
A detail of the wall

=== Environmental heritage ===
- The Soularac Peak (2,368 m)
- The Saint-Barthélemy Peak (2,348 m)

== See also ==
- Communes of the Ariège department
