= Cave of Niaux =

Cave with prehistoric art in France

- Grotte de Niaux (French)
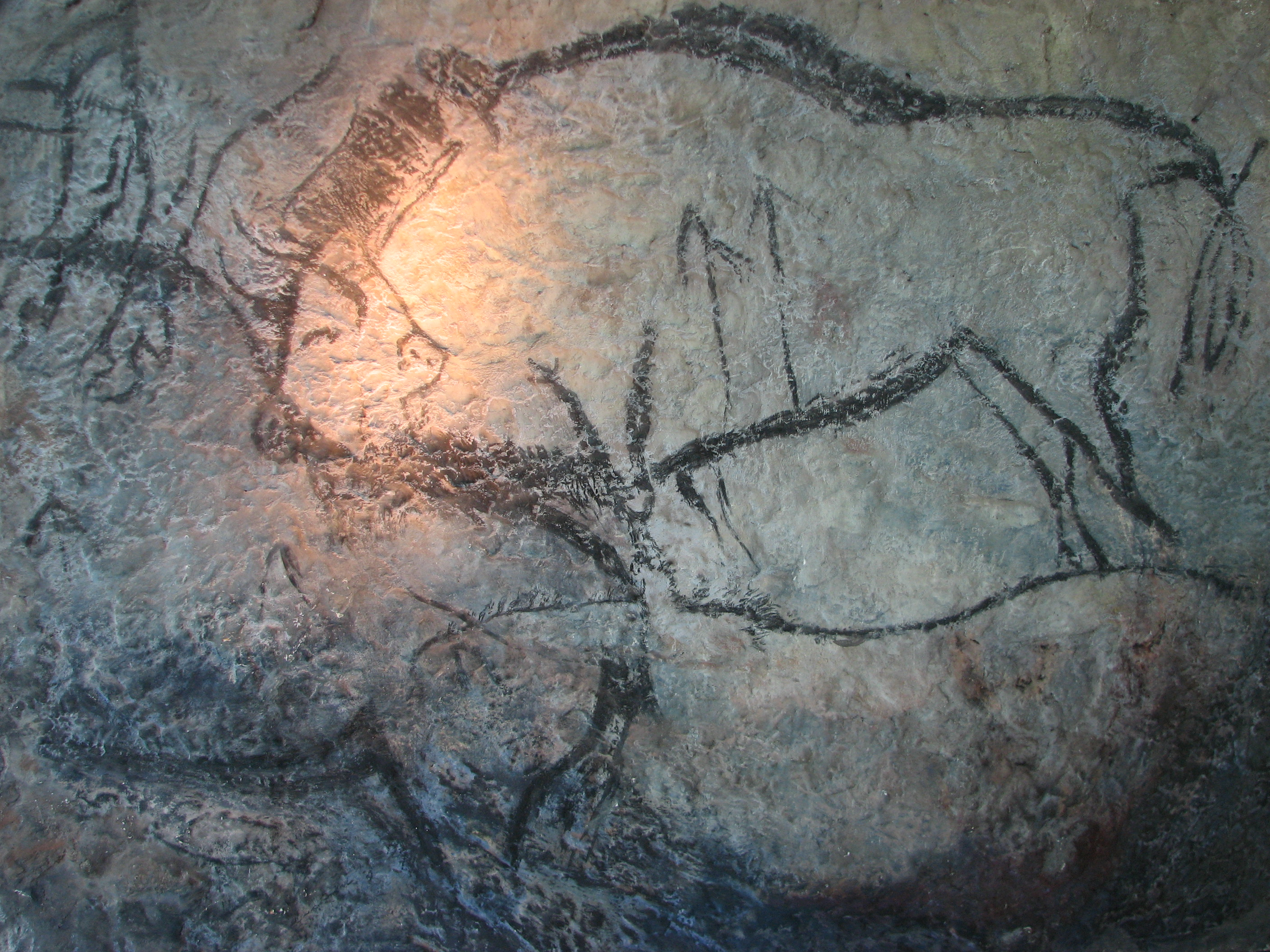
- Copy of a bison painting in the Salon Noir

- Location in Occitania, France
- 42°49′15″N 01°35′37″E
- Type: Cave paintings
- Cultures: Magdalenian
- Associated with: paleo-humans
- Location: Niaux, Occitania, France
- Part of: caves in the Tarascon river basin

History
- Built: c. 17,000 years ago
- Abandoned: c. 9000 BC

Site notes
- Archaeologists: Emile Cartailhac

The Cave of Niaux (French: Grotte de Niaux) is located in the Niaux commune, Ariège département in southwestern France as part of a wider geological system that includes the Sabart Cave and Lombrives Cave in the hill of Cap de la Lesse de Bialac.

The Niaux Cave's system is complex and has a combined length of more than 14 km (8.70 mi) of underground passages and chambers. An archaeological site with a documented history of paleo-human presence, Niaux contains numerous distinct areas and galleries of carefully drawn and vivid wall paintings, executed in a black-outlined style typical of the classic Magdalenian period, between 17,000 and 11,000 years ago.

== Overview ==
Félix Garrigou, prehistorian and hydrologist, known for his investigations of caves of southern France, visited the site in 1864 and was shown some of the paintings.

=== Research ===
Only after a Commander Molard and his sons had discovered the gallery of Salon Noir and published a plan of the cave did Niaux attract specialists' attention in 1869. It was investigated by Henri Breuil and Emile Cartailhac a year later and received full-scale recognition. In 1925, J. Mandeman found another gallery with black paintings and called it Cartailhac Gallery. In 1971, a major scientific examination was undertaken by Jean Clottes and Robert Simonnet and in 1980 and 1981, a team of scientists made an inventory of all the pictures in the cave.

== Site ==
Niaux Cave, situated in a steep-sided valley in the commune of Vicdessos in the Tarascon basin is one of the few cave systems left where exceptional prehistoric paintings can still be viewed by the public. The previously unrecorded separate Reseau Clastres network was only discovered in 1970. It holds a series of prehistoric 'footprints' and a rare charcoal sketch of a weasel.

=== Salon noir panel ===
"The base of the stone is not colored and the range is restricted for the figures: black and some red for a few of the signs.

The predominating animal is the bison, represented in the upper part of the panel. The bison standing out in the left central part is usually catalogued as a female, due to the shapes presented, such as the scarcely prominent hump. By contrast and in opposition to this is the male, found on the right-hand side and showing a more prominent hump.

The lower part of the wall represents several horses which, with painted hair, represent a member of the equine family with a great amount of hair, the Przewalski horse. The bestiary is finished off with two goats, one represented in a very natural manner and the other in a totally schematic manner. The panel is dated as being 13,000 years old. The walk to the paintings leads through both big caves and narrow passages. The cave floor has been left in its natural state: wet, very uneven and slippery in places so sturdy walking shoes are essential."

A facsimile of Niaux's Salon Noir (in its pristine form), as well as of other figures in the cave and the Réseau Clastres, is displayed in the nearby Park of Prehistoric Art, near Tarascon-sur-Ariège.

== See also ==
- Limeuil (prehistoric site)

== Bibliography ==
- ^ Paul G. Bahn; Jean Vertut (1997). Journey Through the Ice Age. University of California Press. pp. 16–. ISBN 978-0-520-21306-7.
