= Miglos =

Commune in Occitanie, France

- Commune
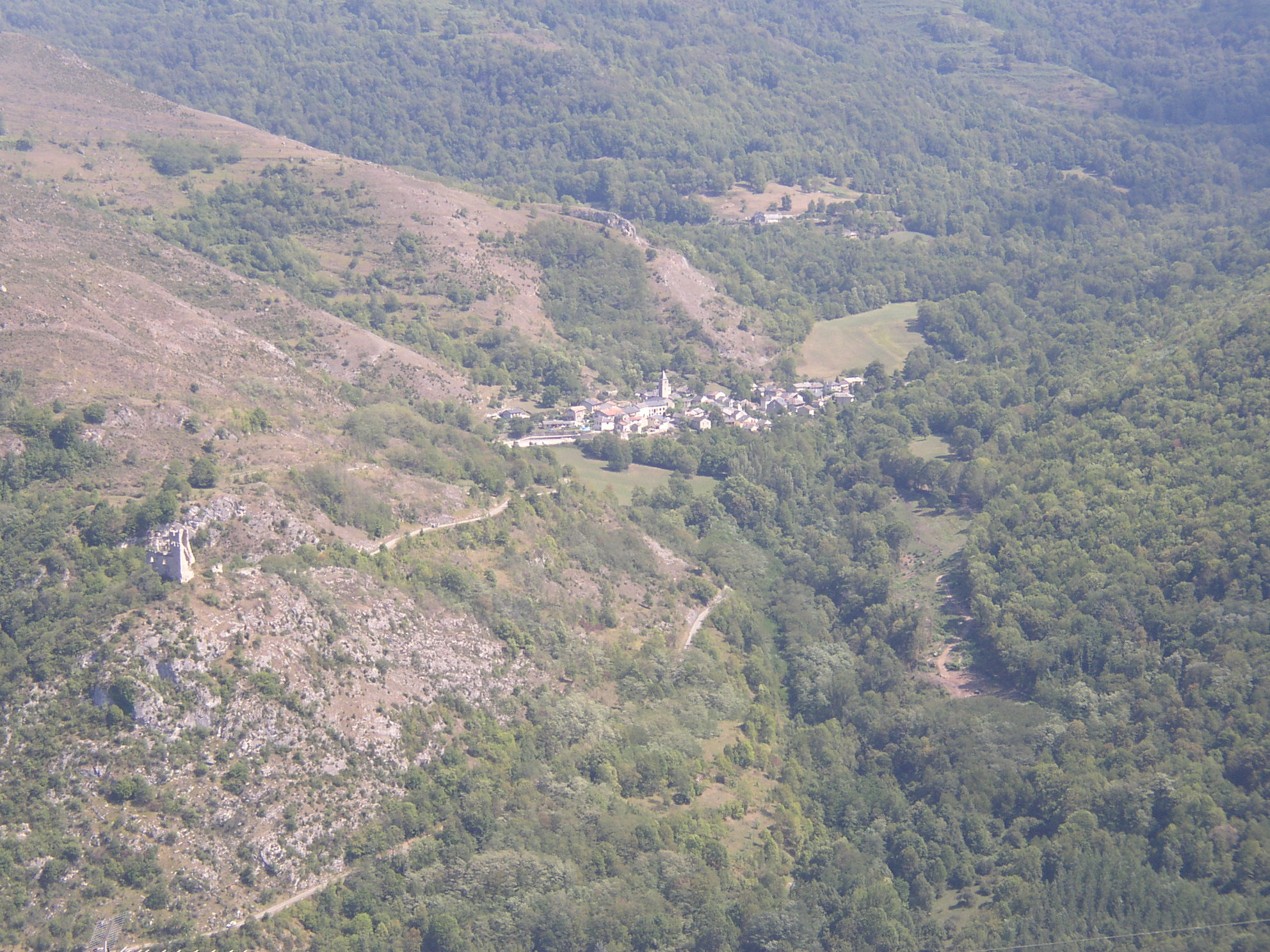
- A general view of Miglos
- Location of Miglos
- Location within France Location within Occitanie
- Coordinates: 42°47′33″N 1°36′01″E
- Country: France
- Region: Occitania
- Department: Ariège
- Arrondissement: Foix
- Canton: Sabarthès
- Intercommunality: Pays de Tarascon

Government
  - Mayor (2020–2026): Sébastien Lacroix
- Area^{1}: 18.76 km^{2} (7.24 sq mi)
- Elevation: 850 m (2,790 ft)
- Highest elevation: 1,903 m (6,243 ft)
- Lowest elevation: 600 m (2,000 ft)
- Population (2023): 142
  - Density: 7.57/km^{2} (19.6/sq mi)
- Time zone: UTC+01:00 (CET)
  - Summer (DST): UTC+02:00 (CEST)
- INSEE/Postal code: 09192 /09400
- ^{1} French Land Register data, which excludes lakes, ponds, glaciers > 1 km^{2} (0.386 sq mi or 247 acres) and river estuaries.

Miglos is a commune in the Ariège department in southwestern France.

== Geography ==
It is located in the former High Ariege in the High County Foix, Sabarthès.

The valley opens to the northwest Vicdessos valley at Capoulet, and to the south it forms a large bowl. The valley has an average altitude of 810 metres (2,660 ft).

The limits of the Barony under the former regime were almost the same as those of today. During the revolutionary period the municipality escaped fragmentation.

== Population ==
Historical population
Year	Pop.	±% p.a.
1968	105	—
1975	120	+1.93%
1982	94	−3.43%
1990	97	+0.39%
1999	80	−2.12%
2007	107	+3.70%
2012	118	+1.98%
2017	117	−0.17%
2023	142	+3.28%
Source: INSEE

== Sights ==
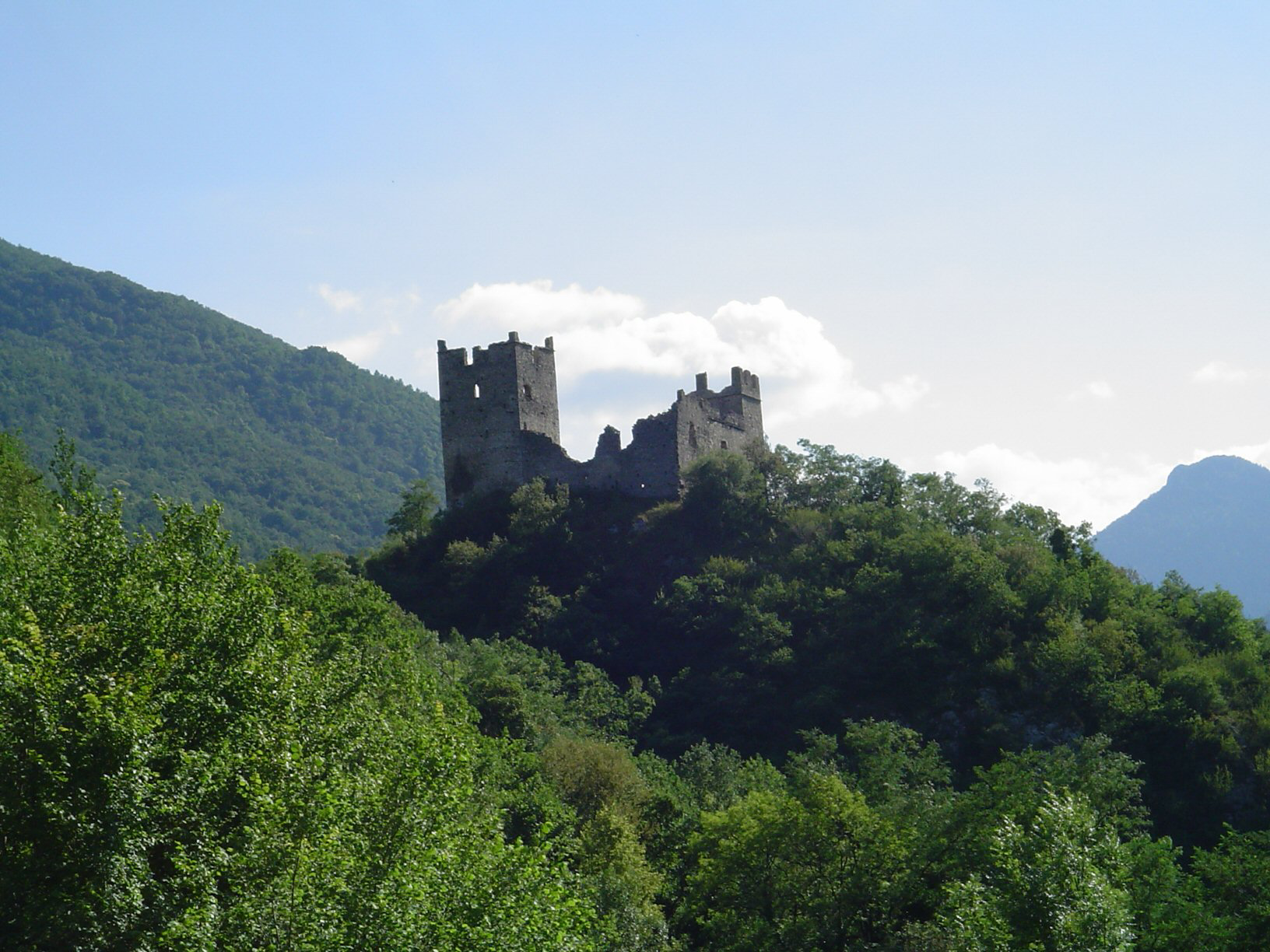
Château de Miglos

Château de Miglos: the ruins of this castle are perched on a limestone outcrop 750 metres (2,460 ft) high, a couple of kilometres upstream from the prehistoric caves at Niaux and the commune of Capoulet, in the valley of Vicdessos. It was built towards the beginning of the 13th century, later razed by order of Cardinal Richelieu and largely damaged at the time of the French Revolution.

In 1830, Jean-Louis Hycinthe de Vendômois, heir to the place, saw his residence plundered during the Guerre des Demoiselles (1829–1832) while opposing the peasants of Ariège with Charles X of France.

== See also ==
- Communes of the Ariège department
