= Château de Miglos =

- Miglos, Ariège, Occitanie in France
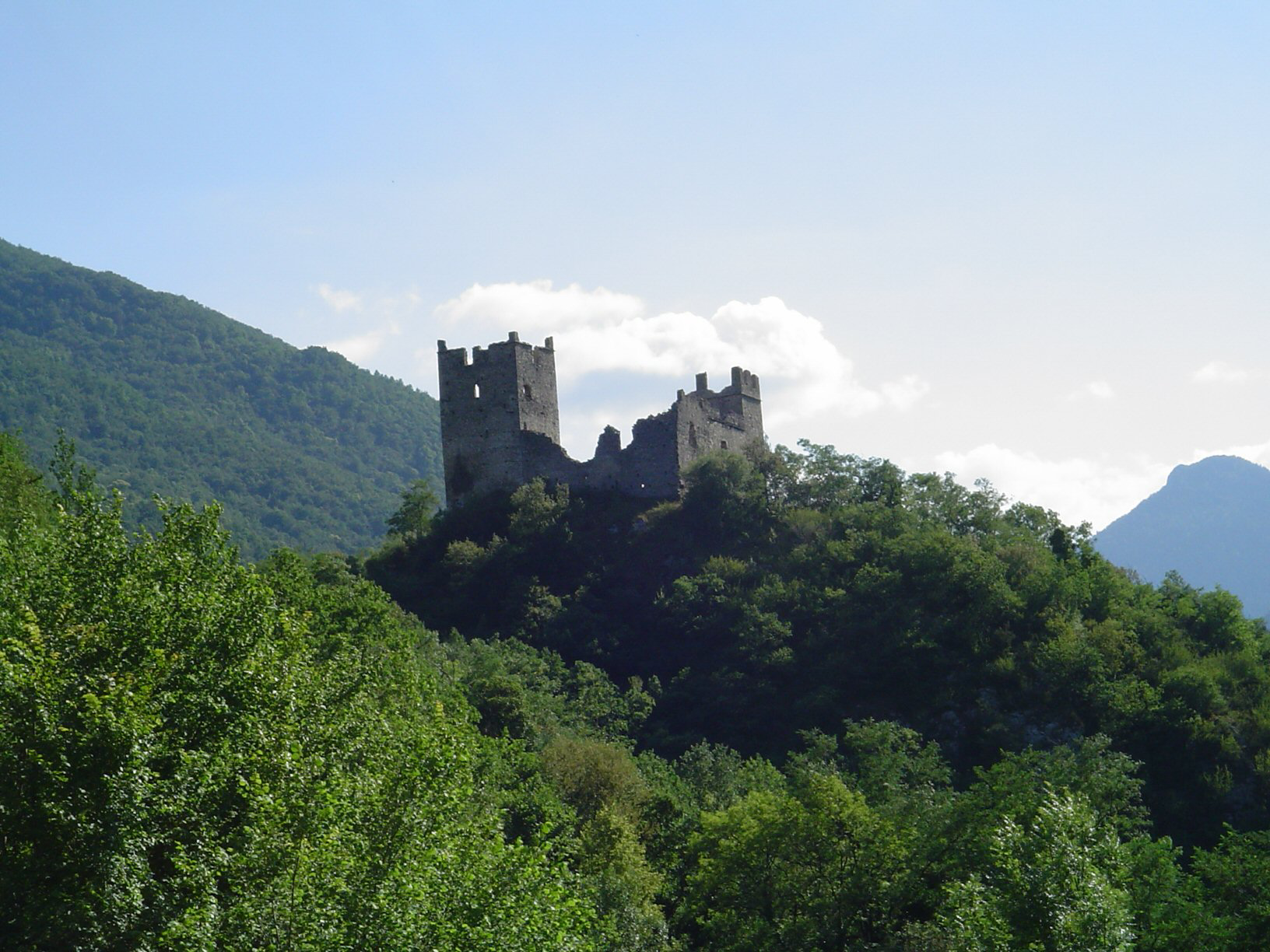
- Château de Miglos

Site information
- Type: Castle
- Owner: Culture Committee of the General Council of Ariège
- Condition: Ruined
- Website: chateau-miglos.fr

Monument historique
- Official name: Ruines du château d'Arquizat
- Designated: 22 September 1987
- Reference no.: PA00093824

Location
- Location of Château de Miglos in the Occitanie region
- Coordinates: 42.796707°N 1.590632°E
- Height: 779 meters

Site history
- Built: 12th century; restored 1320

Château de Miglos, also known as Château d'Arquizat, is a ruined castle in the commune of Miglos in Ariège, Occitanie, France. The castle overlooks the Vicdessos Valley and was a defensive structure for the County of Foix in the 13th and 14th centuries. It is a listed national historic monument of France.

== Structure ==
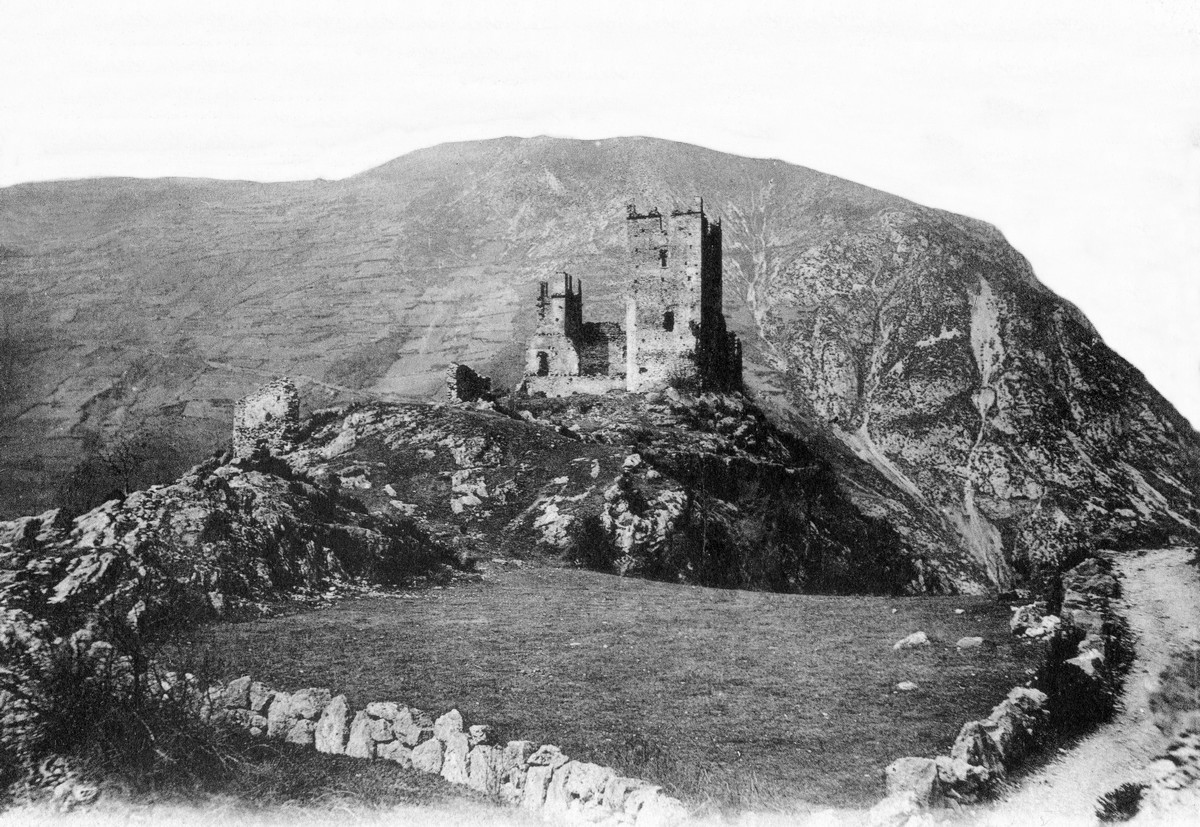
Château c. 1900, before two of the walls of the southeast tower collapsed. A large crack is visible.

The castle stands atop a limestone outcrop overlooking the village of Capoulet-et-Junac and the valleys of Miglos and Vicdessos.

The elliptical platform on which the castle was built is approximately 100 meters long and 30 meters wide. The base of the castle is 22 by 24 meters. The southeast tower was a rectangular keep of four floors that stood 19 meters in height. It retains its north and east walls, built to 1.4 meters thick. The other walls collapsed sometime between the summer 1948 and autumn 1949; photos taken at the turn of the century show an intact tower with a large visible crack.

The second tower in the northwest stood 15 meters and was embattled. It has a ground floor with a dungeon. The walls connecting both towers are pierced with rectangular openings, and contained at least two rooms.

== History ==
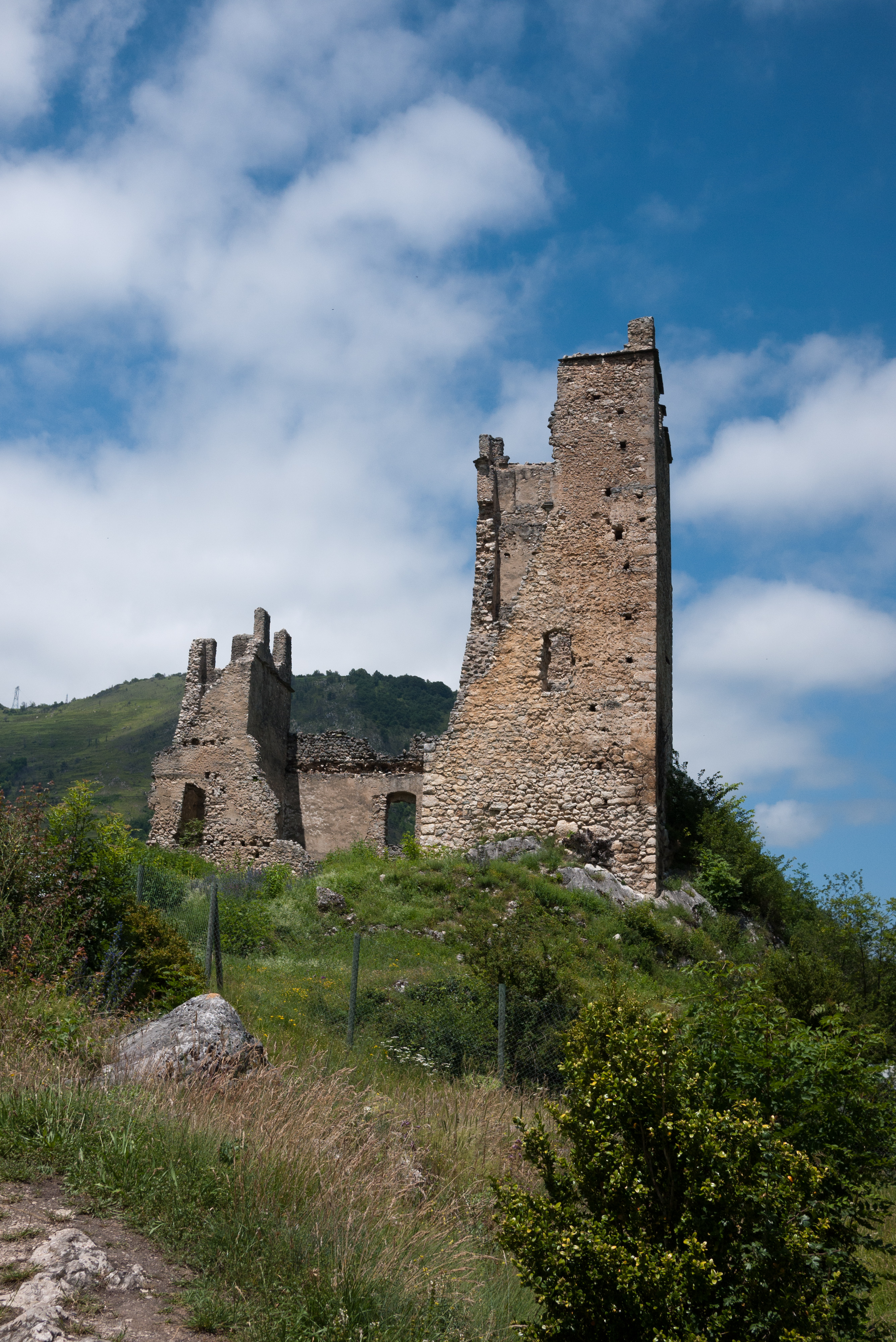
Ruins of the château

As far back as the 12th century, the rock was covered with fortifications protecting Foix.

The castle was part of a major defense system in Foix. It was connected by a signaling system with the Château de Montréal-de-Sos in Auzat, with the Château de Quié and Château de Génat, and with the fort at Castel Merle.

The first mention of the castle in documentation was in the year 1213, in a document of allegiance to the Church of Rome and the King of Aragon, as among the fortifications belonging to Raymond-Roger, Count of Foix. The Lords of Miglos resided in the castle. After the Siege of Montségur in 1244, Arnaud de Miglos was convicted of heresy and imprisoned at Carcassonne. Gaston I, Count of Foix gave the castle and valley to Bernard de Son (or Usson) to punish the Miglos family for its support of the Cathar cause, though the Miglos family regained some property in the area.

Bernard de Son restored the castle in 1320. The castle then passed into the hands of the Rabat family (in 1343), the d'Arnave family (in 1380), the du Léon family, (1400), the Louvie family (in 1450), the de Béon family (in 1510), the de Goth family (in 1575) and finally the de Montauts (in 1610).

The castle was razed by Cardinal Richelieu in the 17th century, and then further damaged during the French Revolution.

After the death of Jean-Louis de Montaut, Baron de Miglos, the castle passed to his daughter Jeanne-Françoise and her husband, Jean-Louis Hyacinthe Vendômois. In 1830, the castle was plundered during the Guerre des Demoiselles.

== Château today ==
In 1976, sisters Mathilde and Pierrette Gouzy purchased the castle ruins, and donated it to the local council in 1984. Since 1999, two crystallization projects and additional restoration have strengthened the keep and the northwest tower.

A volunteer group, The Association of the Friends of the Château de Miglos (French: L'Association des Amis du Château de Miglos), organizes events including Heritage Days and restoration work for the castle.
