= Lombrives =

Cave in France

Grotte de Lombrives
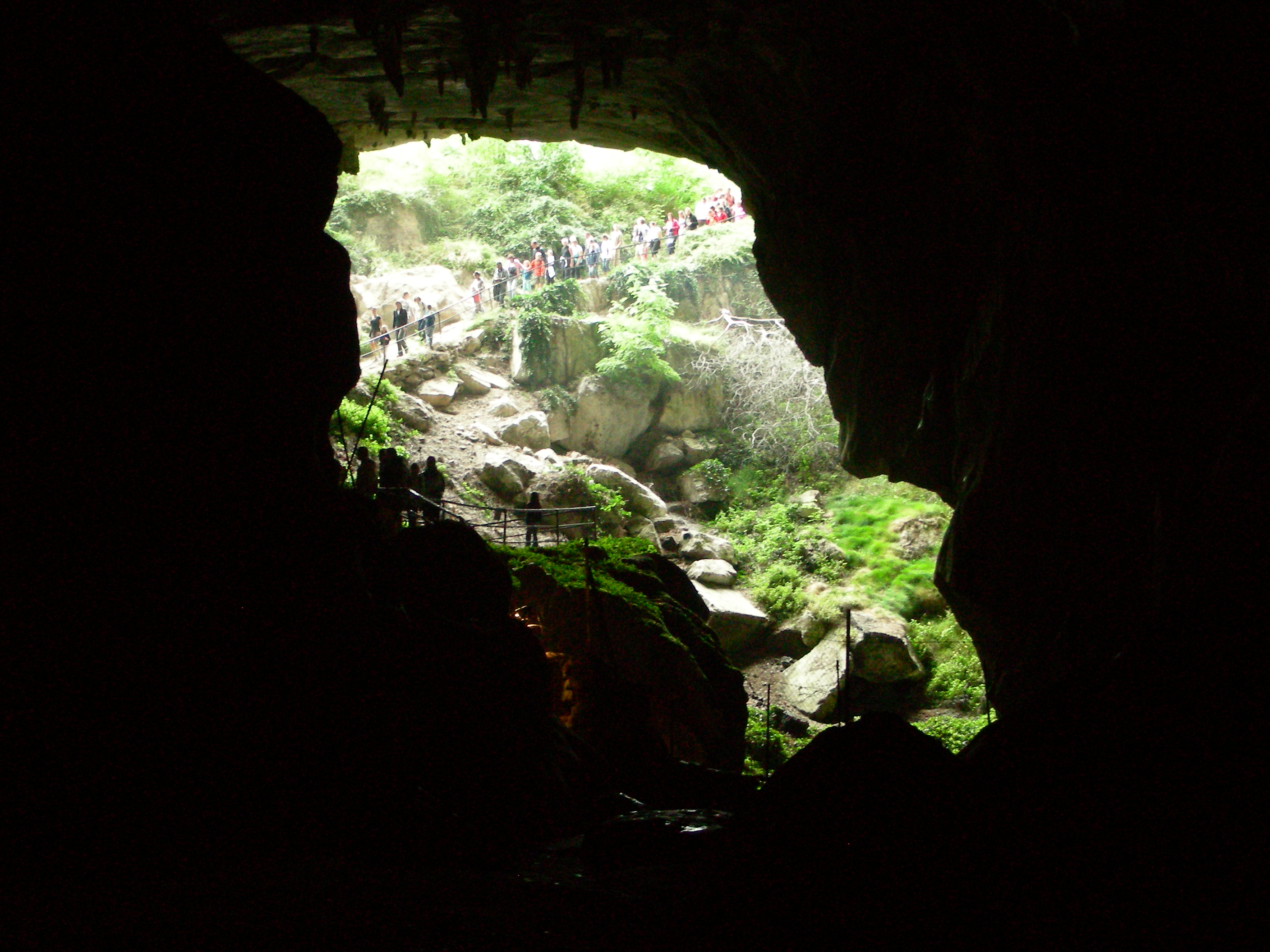
- Entrance to Lombrives

- Location within France
- Location: Ornolac-Ussat-les-Bains, near Tarascon, Ariège, France
- Coordinates: 42°49′24″N 01°36′59″E
- Website: Grotte de Lombrives

Grotte de Lombrives or Lombrives Cave is a large natural cavern located in Ornolac-Ussat-les-Bains, at the eastern edge of the Pyrénées Ariégeoises Natural Regional Park, in the Ariège department of Occitanie, in southwestern France.

It is still advertised as "the largest cave in Europe" on their website, but in 2017 the cave came under new management and a new website was created which removed the former's fantastically exaggerated statements, including a non-existent Guinness World Record. Those exaggerations persist online on numerous other web pages.

== Location and general characteristics ==
The cave has a length of 8 km (5.0 mi). It is located inside a limestone mountain named Cap de la Lesse between the Vicdessos and Ariège valley. There are three caves in this mountain, Niaux and Sabart in the Vicdessos valley, Lombrives in the Ariège valley. All three caves together are 14 km (8.7 mi) long, but while it is obvious that they belong to the same system, only the caves of Niaux and Lombrives are connected; neither is connected with Sabart. The caves are found on two main levels, the upper level around 650 m (2,130 ft) above sea level and the lower level around 550 m (1,800 ft), which are the main stages of cave development. There is also an intermediate level at 600 m (2,000 ft) which has much fewer passages but is the entrance section of the Lombrives show cave. The three levels are connected by numerous vertical shafts.

== Characteristics and history ==
The cave has two huge chambers which are both part of the tourist trail. The Cathedral Chamber, which is 80 m (260 ft) high, is on the regular tour. To make this size a little more understandable the guides compare it with the Cathedral of Notre-Dame in Paris, which would fit into the chamber. The even bigger Salle de l’Empire de Satan ("Chamber of the Empire of Satan") is the end of the long cave trekking tour which is also offered. It is located 4 km (2.5 mi) from the entrance. A shaft in the floor of the chamber called Garrigou pit is 150 m (490 ft) deep. The engineer and geologist Raoul Perpère (1864–1950) constructed a bridge across the pit in 1927, while he was developing the cave as a show cave. The cave has a great variety of speleothems or formations, including stalactites, stalagmites, rimstone pools, cave pearls, helictites, and calcite crystals.

The cave has served as a refuge throughout history. The earliest excavations by Félix Régnault took place in the late 19th century and confirmed human occupation during the Neolithic. It was also used for the burial of a Bronze Age man. Between the 12th and 14th centuries the "heretic" Cathars gathered at the site. Later the cave was a hideout for Huguenots.

Today the cave is a tourist attraction, offering a selection of guided tours lasting between two and five hours.

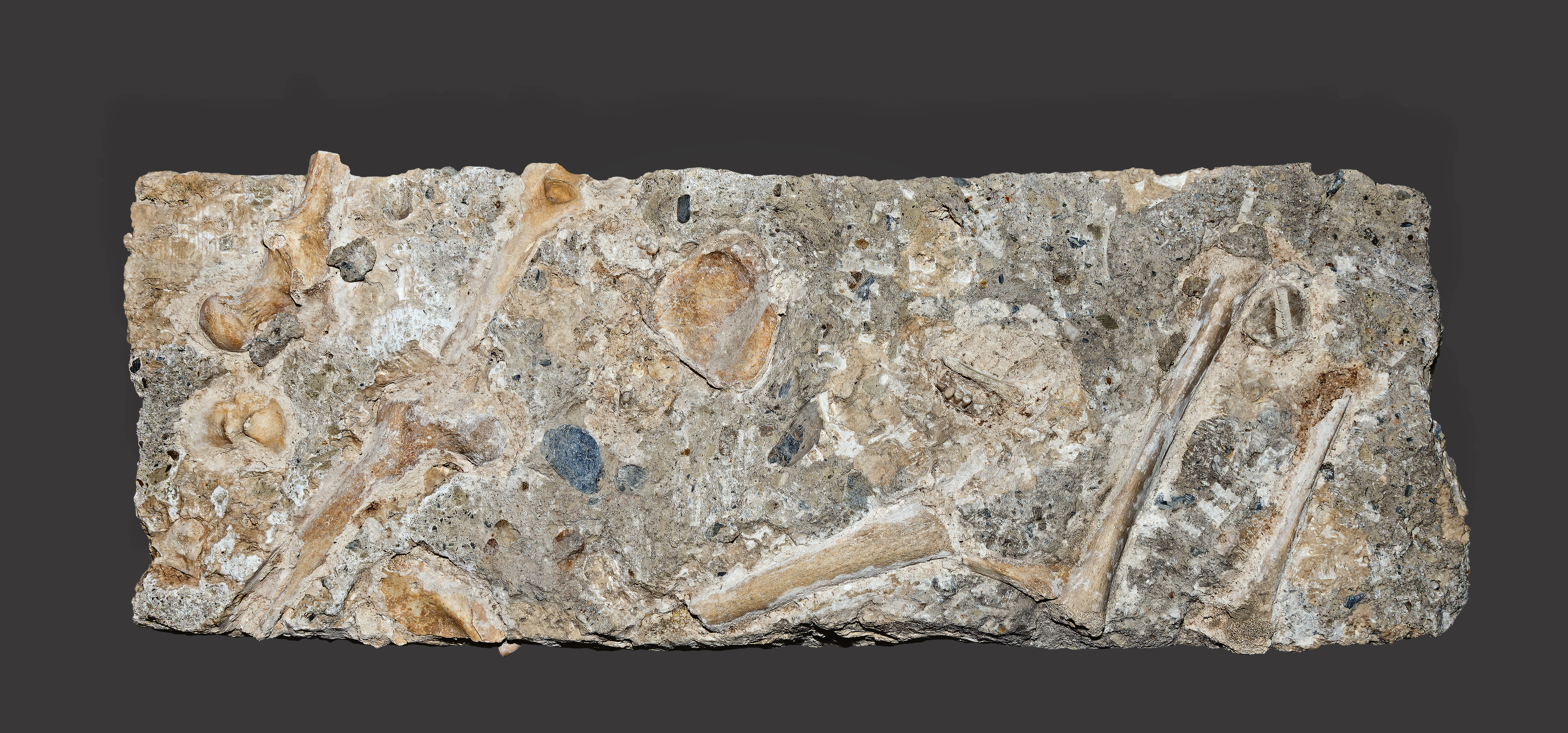
Homo sapiens Bronze Age, Noulet 1882 MHNT

In 2021 the Deep Time experiment took place in the cave, during which a group of 15 volunteers spent 40 days in the cave as an experiment to see how the lack of clocks, daylight and external communications would affect them.

== Legends ==
One of the legends with which the Lombrives cave is associated is the legend of the princess of the Pyrenees. Another legend says that in 1244, Cathar treasures were hidden at the foot of the cave. The cave was also considered a refuge for spirits and local residents were afraid to enter it.

== Links ==
- Grotte de Lombrives Official Website in English
- Show Caves of France: Grotte de Lombrives
- Deep Time
