= Pont du Diable (Ariège) =

Coordinates: 42°54′23″N 1°38′27″E

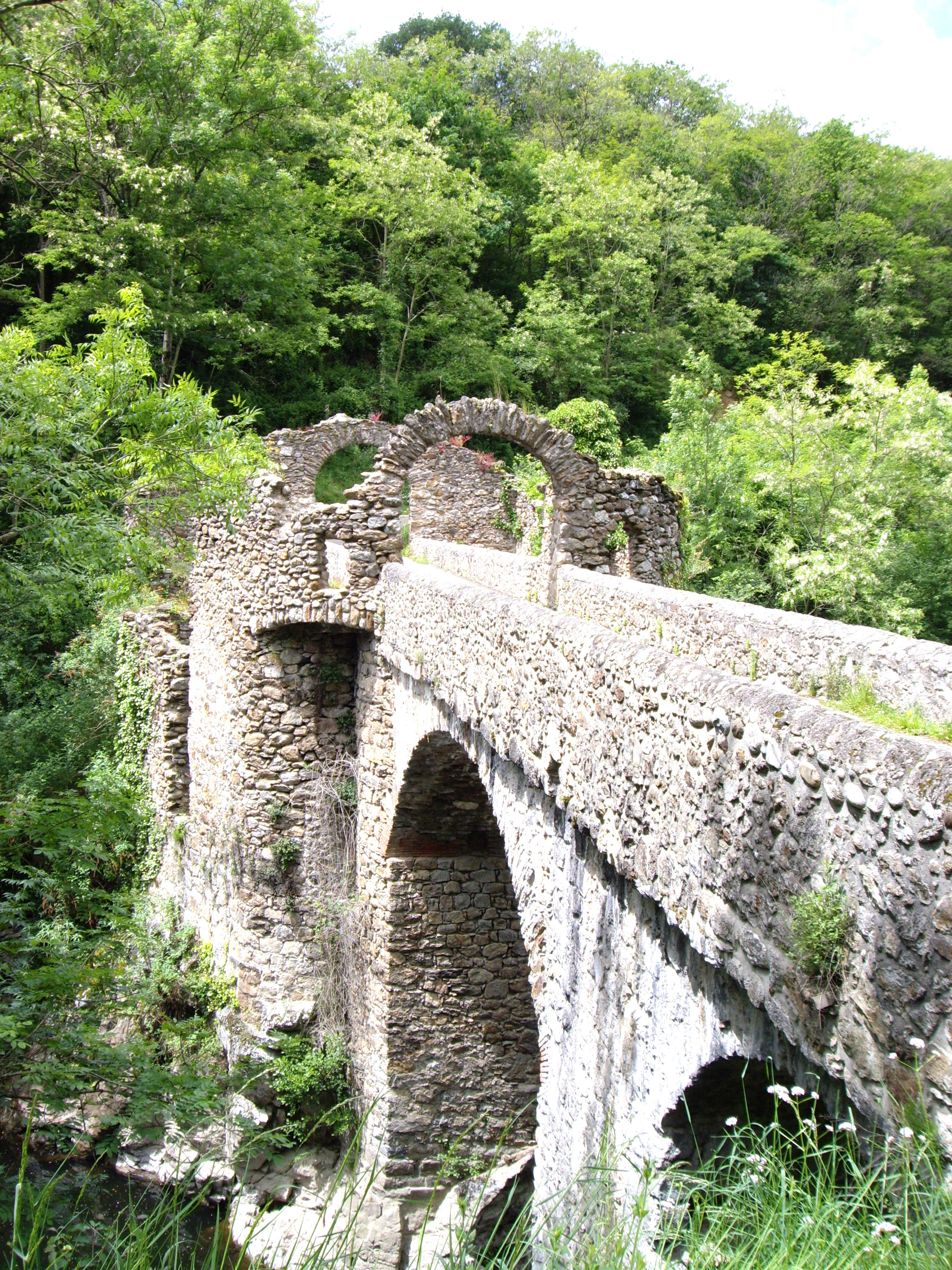

The Pont du Diable (Devil's Bridge) is a bridge over the Ariège river between Foix and Tarascon-sur-Ariège, located in the commune of Montoulieu, in the Ariège department of France. It dates from the Middle Ages. It is one of 49 Devil's Bridges in France.

== Legend ==
Like all similarly named bridges, its origins are the subject of legend involving a deal with the Devil to achieve construction.

In the 13th century, the Count of Foix, Raymond-Roger, ordered the Baron of Saint-Paul to build a bridge across the Ariège to join Montoulieu and Saint-Paul-de-Jarrat. He was given a month to build it, on pain of being hung. The baron, though, was a wastrel who had no money to pay for material or workers. In despair, he made a deal with the Devil who would build the bridge, but who demanded the soul of the first to cross it. The bridge was to be completed by the next morning. Feeling guilt, the baron went to the church of Saint-Volusien and confessed to the abbot, who had an idea. When the bridge was ready, the baron arrived and found the Devil waiting. He asked the baron if he was to be the first soul to cross, but the baron said he was not and opened a basket he was carrying out of which jumped a large cat with a saucepan tied to its tail. Frightened by the noise, the cat ran across the bridge. Defeated and humiliated by such trickery, the Devil left and never returned.

== Description ==
The bridge connects the village of Montoulieu to the right bank of the Ariège. It is a fortified arched bridge located in a deep part of the valley. On the left bank are the ruins of a fortified house which was the bridgehead as well as the two entry and exit arches. The bridge is a single, very high arch.

Despite the legend, and the Ministry of Culture description, the bridge is not mentioned in any ancient texts or maps. In reality, the bridge was built in 1836 by a local entrepreneur, Adolphe Garrigou, for his brother-in-law and partner, the polytechnician Léo Lamarque (b. 30 August 1808 in Algiers, d. 29 July 1849). Lamarque had worked with the mathematician Jean-Victor Poncelet (1788–1867) and he experimented there with a water wheel of his invention. It was attached to the end of a long axis, which plunged directly into the vortex of the river, between the two main arches of the bridge, which explains the absence of a supply channel and the traditional installations of a mill.

In 1946, a restoration of the building was carried out, including the repair of a corbelled structure, the consolidation of the crests of the walls as well as a clearing of brush.

== Protection ==
The site in the commune of Mercus-Garrabet was listed as a monument historique on 30 April 1942 and the bridge itself was classified on 17 April 1950. The bridge is the property of the commune.

== Gallery ==
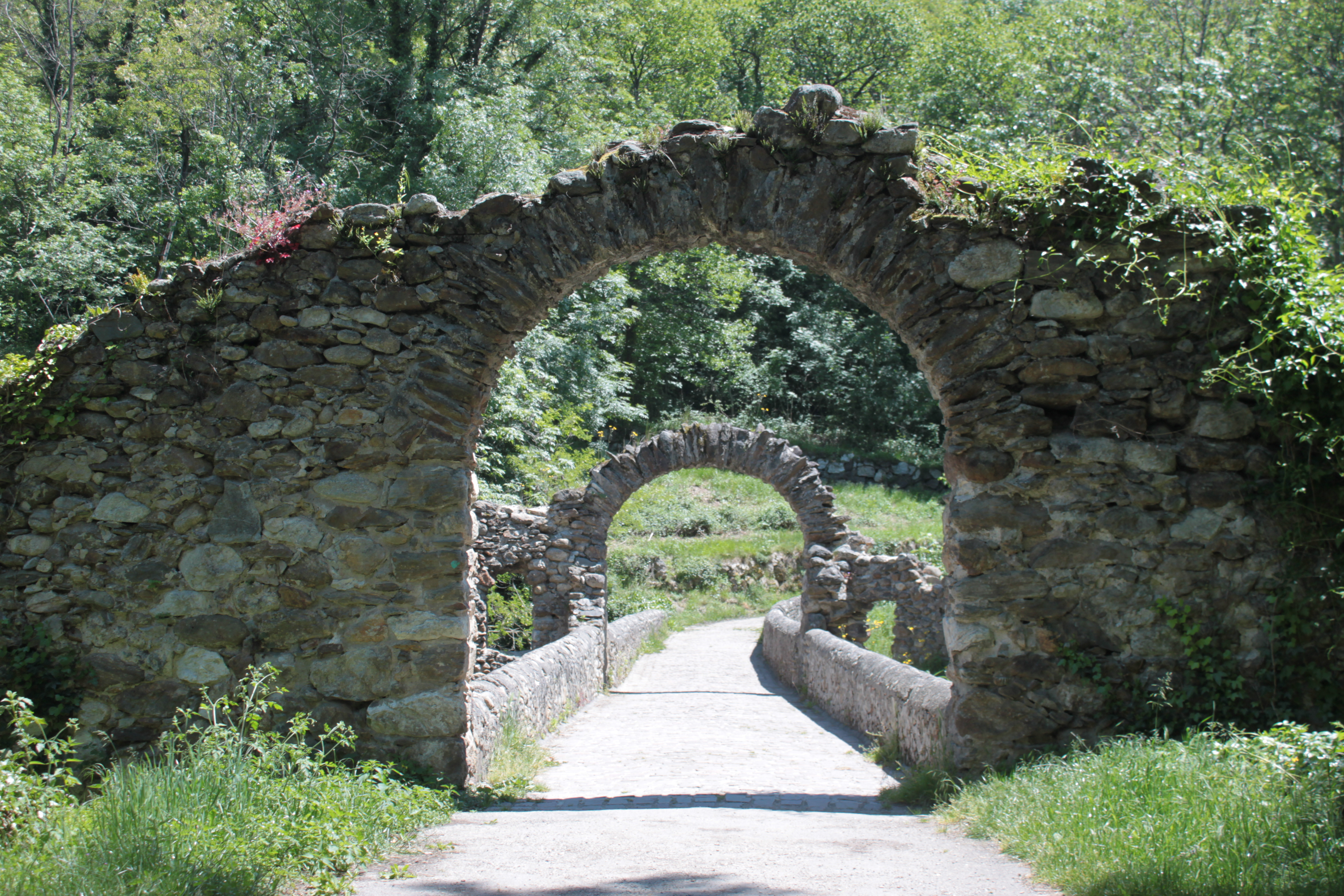
The arches.

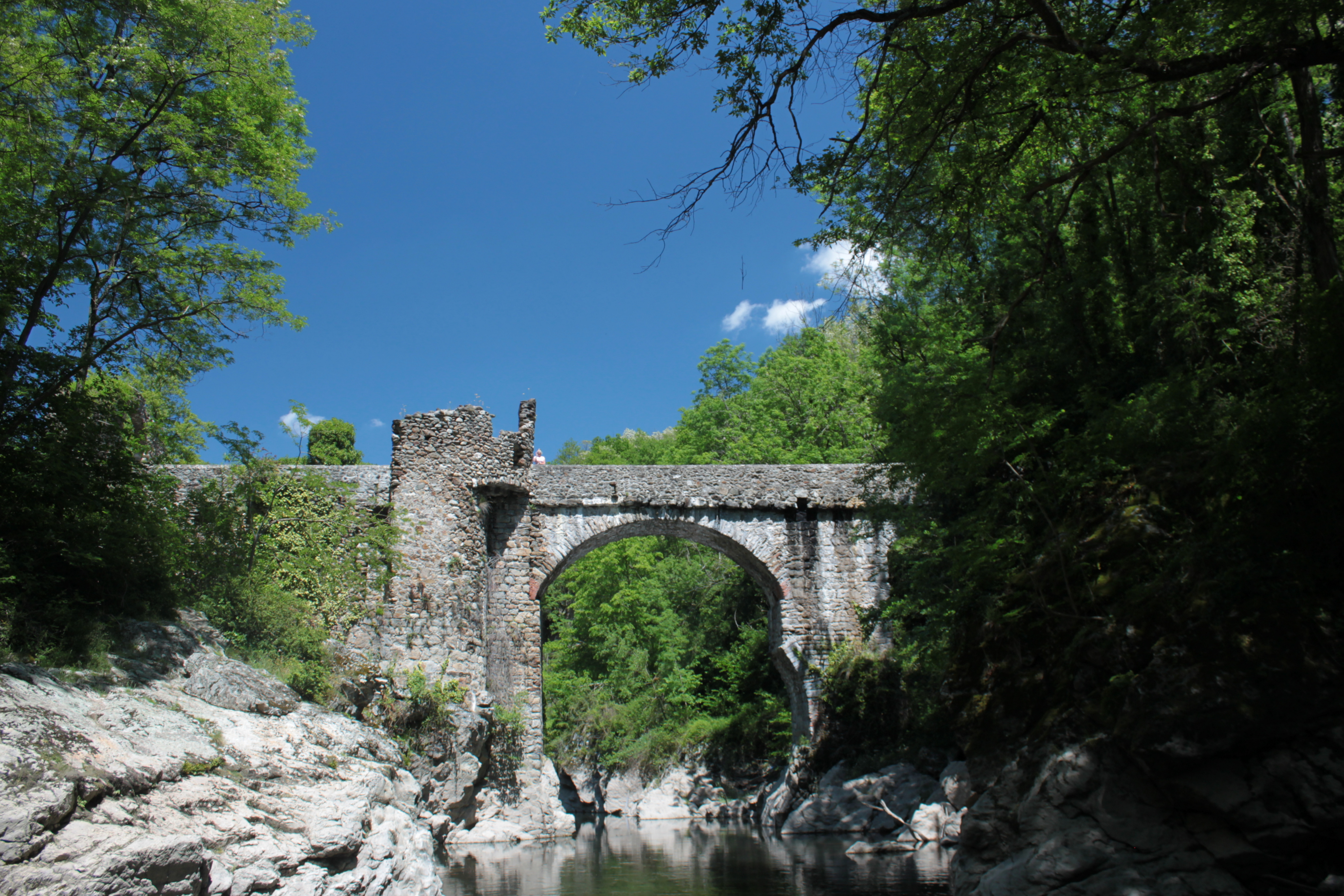
Looking downstream

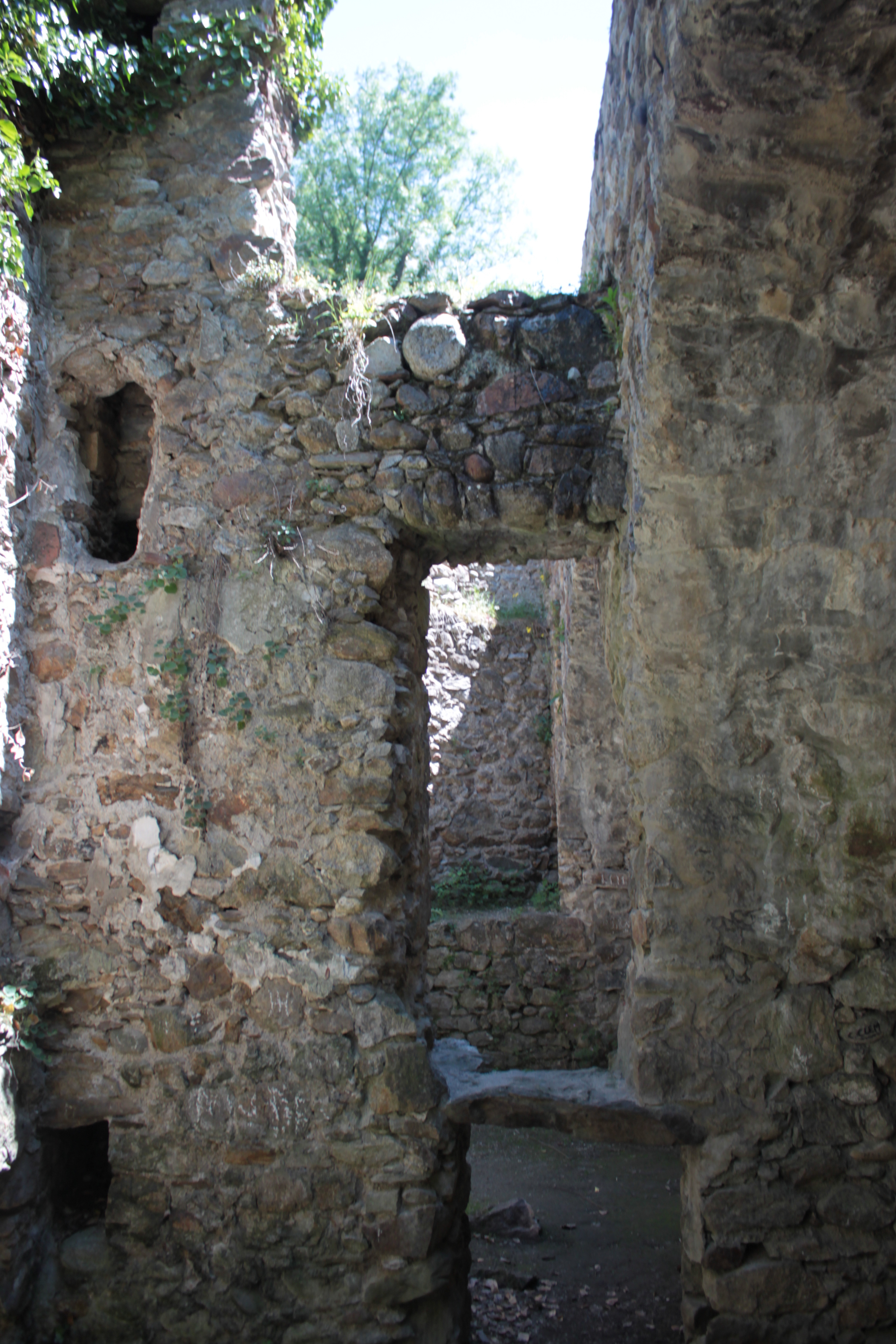
Remains of the mill

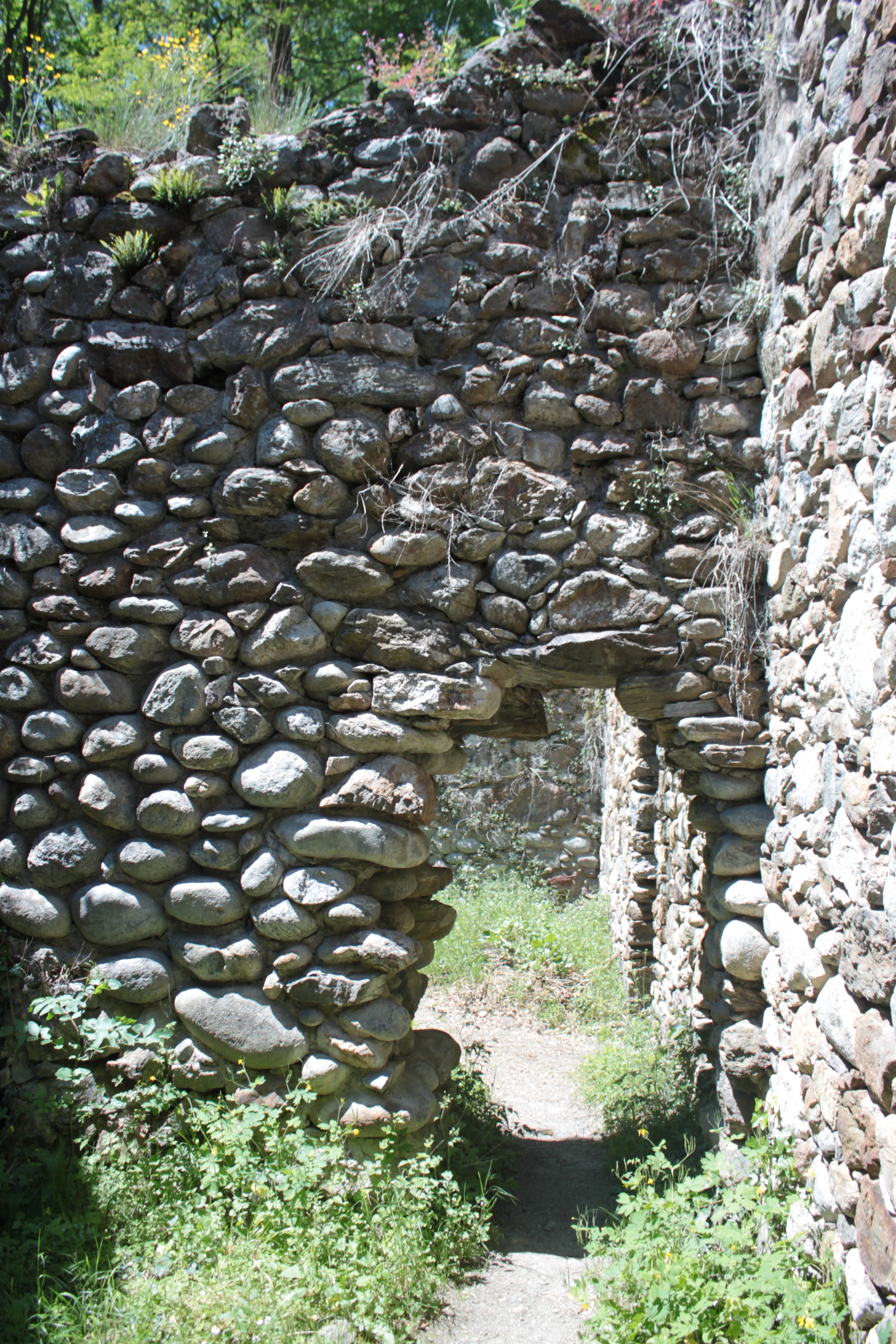
Remains of the mill

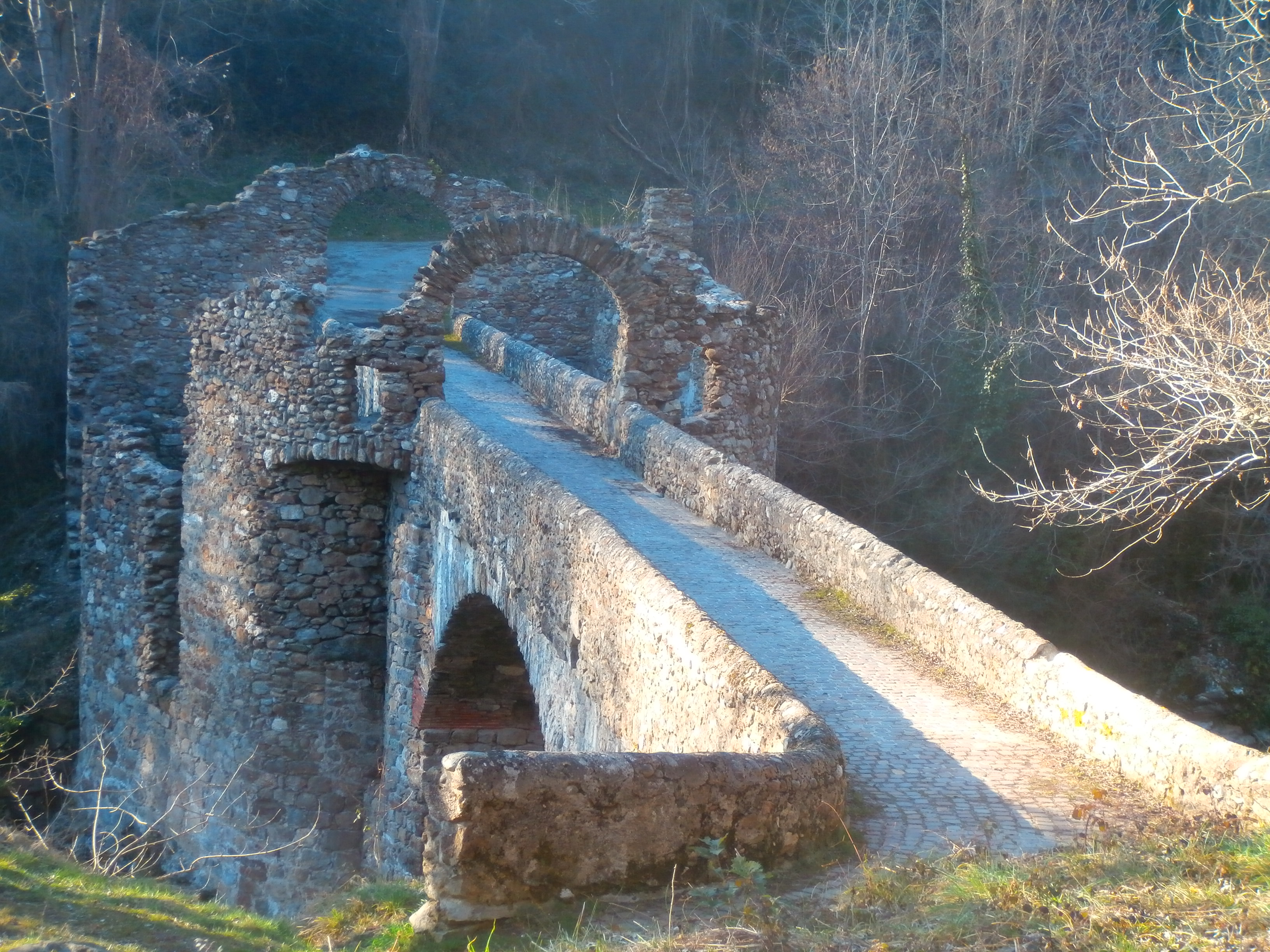
Le pont du diable.
