= Félix Garrigou =

French physician, prehistorian, and hydrologist

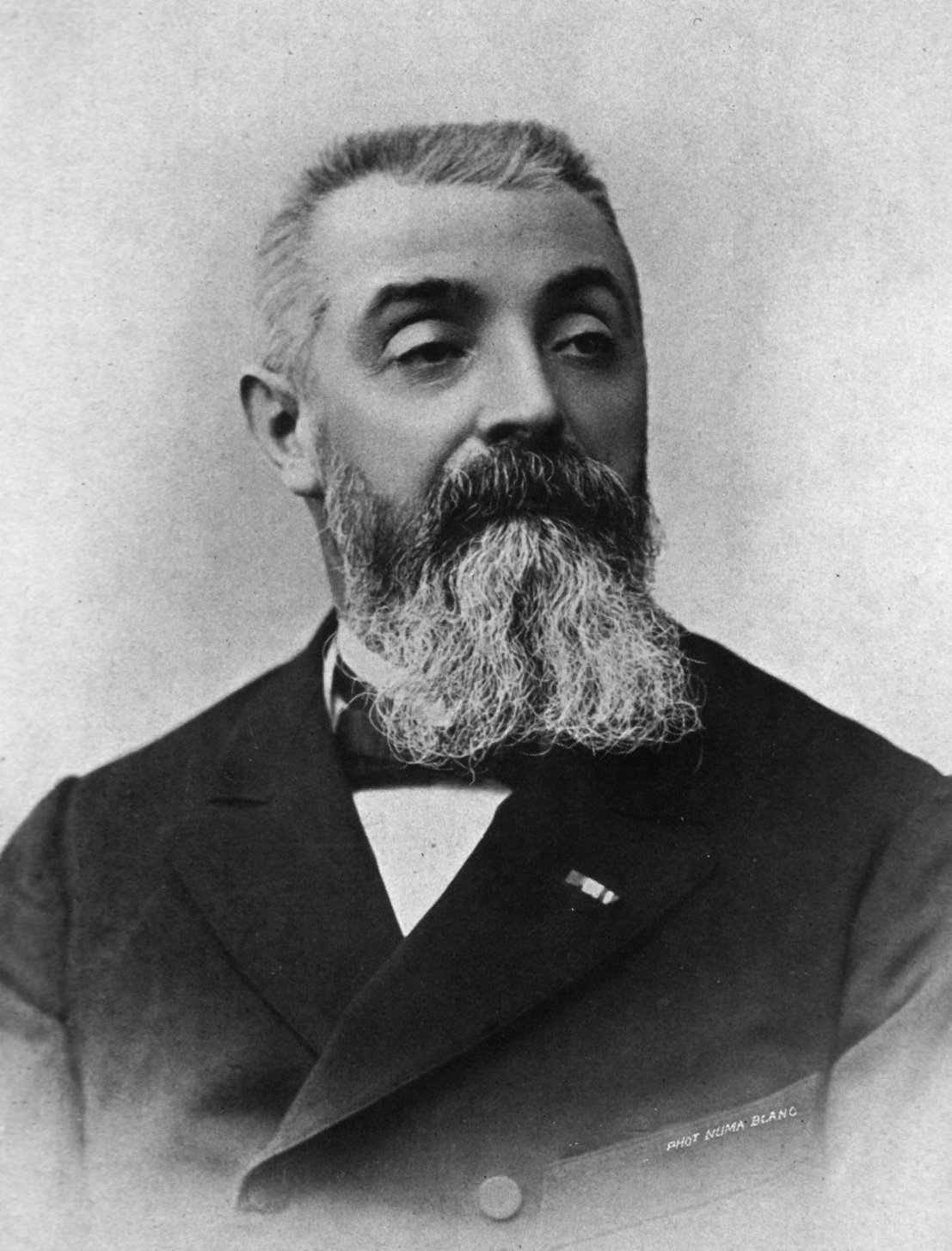
Félix Garrigou (1835-1920)

Joseph Louis Félix Garrigou (16 September 1835, Tarascon-sur-Ariège - 1920) was a French physician, prehistorian and hydrologist. He is known for his investigations of prehistoric artifacts and remains (human and animal) found in caves of southern France (Pyrenees). Also, he was the author of numerous writings on mineral waters from a chemical/medical perspective.

A native of Tarascon-sur-Ariège, Garrigou received his medical doctorate in Paris. Subsequently he served as a physician in the town of Ax-les-Thermes, afterwards working in Bagnères-de-Luchon (from 1869). In 1891 he was appointed chair of medical hydrology at Toulouse.

He was a founding member of the Association pyrénéenne, and a member of the Comité des travaux historiques et scientifiques (1872-1912), the Société géologique de France and the Société d'Anthropologie de Paris.

== Selected writings ==
- Étude chimique et médicale des eaux sulfureuses d'Ax (Ariège), 1862 - Chemical and medical studies of the sulfurous water of Ax (Ariège).
- L'Age de la Pierre dans les cavernes de la vallée de Tarascon (Ariège) (with Henri Filhol), 1863 - The Stone Age caves in the valley of Tarascon.
- L'âge du renne dans les Basses-Pyrénées (caverne d'Espalungue), (with Louis Martin), 1864 - The era of the reindeer in the Basses-Pyrenees (caverns of Espalungue).
- Age de la pierre polie dans les cavernes des Pyrénées ariégeoises, 1866 - Era of polished stone in caves in the Ariègois Pyrenees.
- Généralités sur les eaux minérales des Pyrénées, 1873 - Overview on the mineral waters of the Pyrenees.
- Passé, présent, avenir de Luchon, 1874 - Past, present, future of Luchon.
- Histoire de la découverte du mercure dans l'eau de la source du Rocher de Saint-Nectaire (Puy de Dôme), 1879 - History of the discovery of mercury in the water from the source rock of Saint-Nectaire (Puy-de-Dôme).
- L'enseignement de l'hydrologie A Toulouse: La creation d'un Institut d'hydrologie, 1911 - Assignment of hydrology at Toulouse: The creation of an institute of hydrology.
