= Niaux =

Commune in Occitanie, France

- Commune
- Location of Niaux
- Location within France Location within Occitanie
- Coordinates: 42°48′51″N 1°35′31″E
- Country: France
- Region: Occitania
- Department: Ariège
- Arrondissement: Foix
- Canton: Sabarthès
- Intercommunality: Pays de Tarascon

Government
  - Mayor (2020–2026): Jean Idarreta
- Area^{1}: 3.99 km^{2} (1.54 sq mi)
- Elevation: 546 m (1,791 ft)
- Highest elevation: 1,322 m (4,337 ft)
- Lowest elevation: 509 m (1,670 ft)
- Population (2023): 150
  - Density: 38/km^{2} (97/sq mi)
- Time zone: UTC+01:00 (CET)
  - Summer (DST): UTC+02:00 (CEST)
- INSEE/Postal code: 09217 /09400
- ^{1} French Land Register data, which excludes lakes, ponds, glaciers > 1 km^{2} (0.386 sq mi or 247 acres) and river estuaries.

Niaux is a commune in the Ariège department in southwestern France.

Located on the right banks of the Vicdessos river, Niaux is the site of the Cave of Niaux, which is famous for its prehistoric cave paintings of bison and horses from the Magdalenian era.

== Population ==
Inhabitants are called Niauxéens in French.

Historical population
Year	Pop.	±% p.a.
1968	228	—
1975	221	−0.44%
1982	230	+0.57%
1990	226	−0.22%
1999	201	−1.29%
2007	194	−0.44%
2012	184	−1.05%
2017	165	−2.16%
2023	150	−1.58%
Source: INSEE

== See also ==
- Communes of the Ariège department
