= Montoulieu, Ariège =

Commune in Occitanie, France

Montoulieu
- Commune
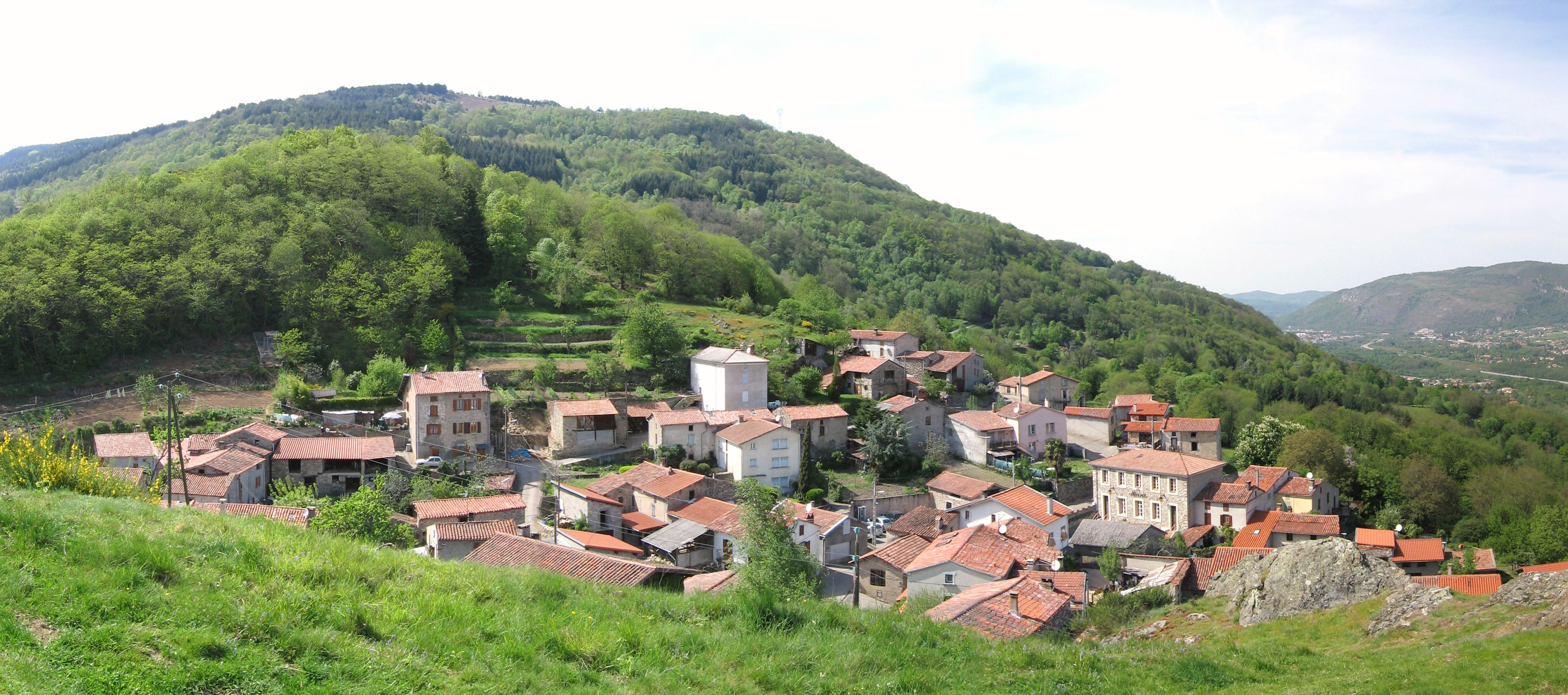
- A general view of Montoulieu
- Location of Montoulieu
- Location within France Location within Occitanie
- Coordinates: 42°54′32″N 1°37′45″E
- Country: France
- Region: Occitania
- Department: Ariège
- Arrondissement: Foix
- Canton: Sabarthès
- Intercommunality: CA Pays Foix-Varilhes

Government
  - Mayor (2022–2026): Françoise Fernandez
- Area^{1}: 14.12 km^{2} (5.45 sq mi)
- Elevation: 400 m (1,300 ft)
- Highest elevation: 1,488 m (4,882 ft)
- Lowest elevation: 428 m (1,404 ft)
- Population (2023): 415
  - Density: 29.4/km^{2} (76.1/sq mi)
- Time zone: UTC+01:00 (CET)
  - Summer (DST): UTC+02:00 (CEST)
- INSEE/Postal code: 09210 /09000
- ^{1} French Land Register data, which excludes lakes, ponds, glaciers > 1 km^{2} (0.386 sq mi or 247 acres) and river estuaries.

Montoulieu (French pronunciation: [mɔ̃tuljø]; Occitan: Montoliu) is a commune in the Ariège department in southwestern France.

== Population ==
Historical population
Year	Pop.	±% p.a.
1968	398	—
1975	202	−9.23%
1982	220	+1.23%
1990	278	+2.97%
1999	305	+1.04%
2007	363	+2.20%
2012	338	−1.42%
2017	410	+3.94%
2023	415	+0.20%
Source: INSEE

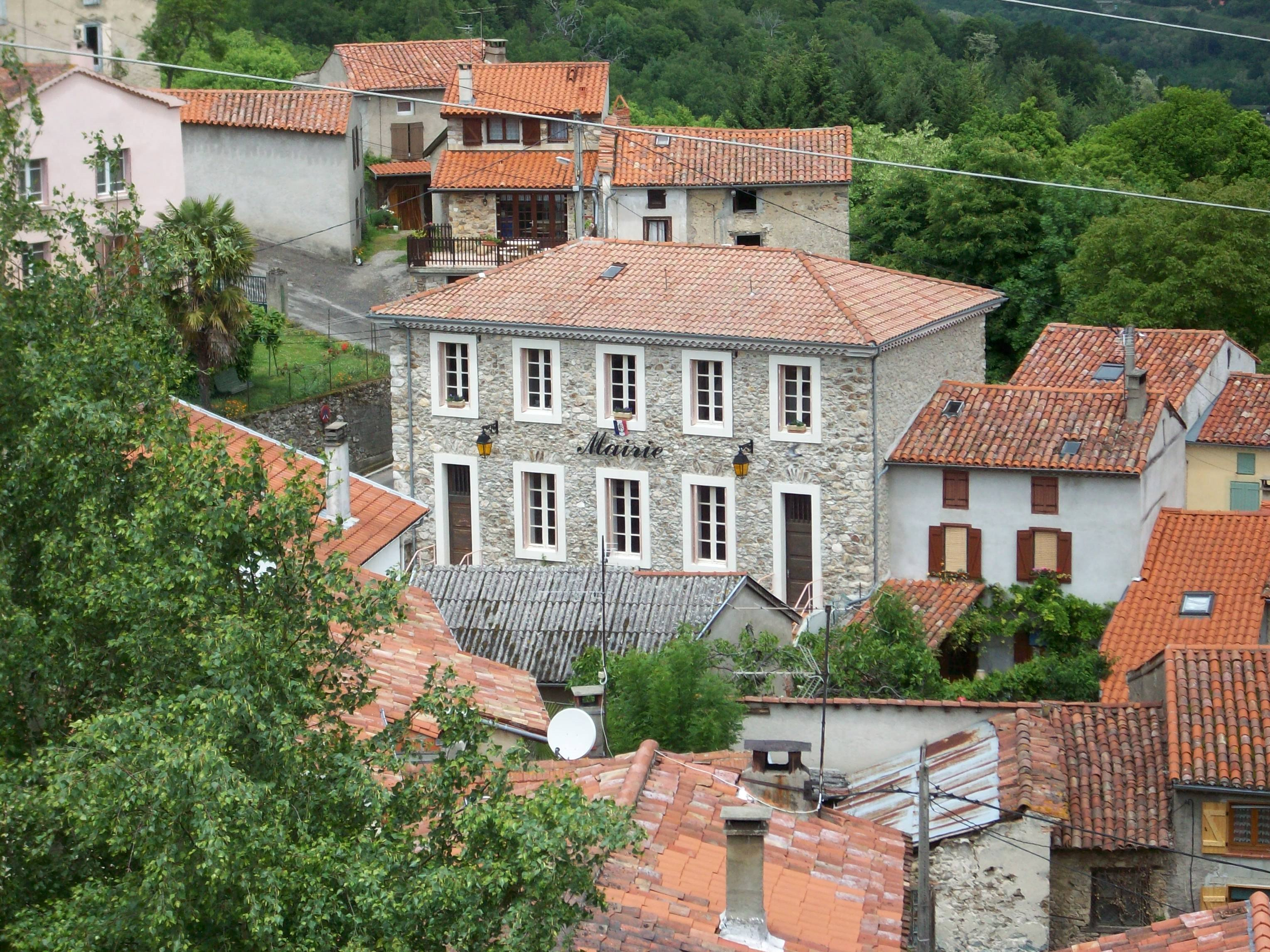
Town hall

== See also ==
- Communes of the Ariège department
