= Ascon =

Ascon and ASCON may refer to:

- Ascon (cipher), a lightweight cipher
- Asconoid, a wall structure of sponges
- The original name of Ascaron, a defunct German company
- ASCON, a Russian company
- The Occitan name for Ascou, a French commune
