= Émilien =

- Gender: Male

Origin
- Region of origin: France and Francophone nations and territories

Other names
- Related names: Émile

Émilien is a French masculine given name and may refer to:

- Émilien of Nantes (died c. 725), French religious leader canonized as a saint
- Émilien Allard (1915–1977), Canadian carillonneur, pianist, clarinetist, and composer
- Émilien Amaury (1909-1977), French publishing magnate
- Émilien-Benoît Bergès (born 1983), French road racing cyclist
- Émilien Dumas (1804–1873), French scholar, paleontologist, and geologist
- Émilien Jacquelin (born 1995), French biathlete
- Émilien Lafrance (1911–1977), Canadian politician
- Émilien Morissette (born 1927), Canadian politician
- Émilien de Nieuwerkerke (1811–1892), French sculptor
- Émilien Pelletier (born 1945), Canadian politician
- Émilien Viennet (born 1992), French road and cyclo-cyclist
