= Ax-les-Thermes =

Commune in Occitanie, France

- Commune
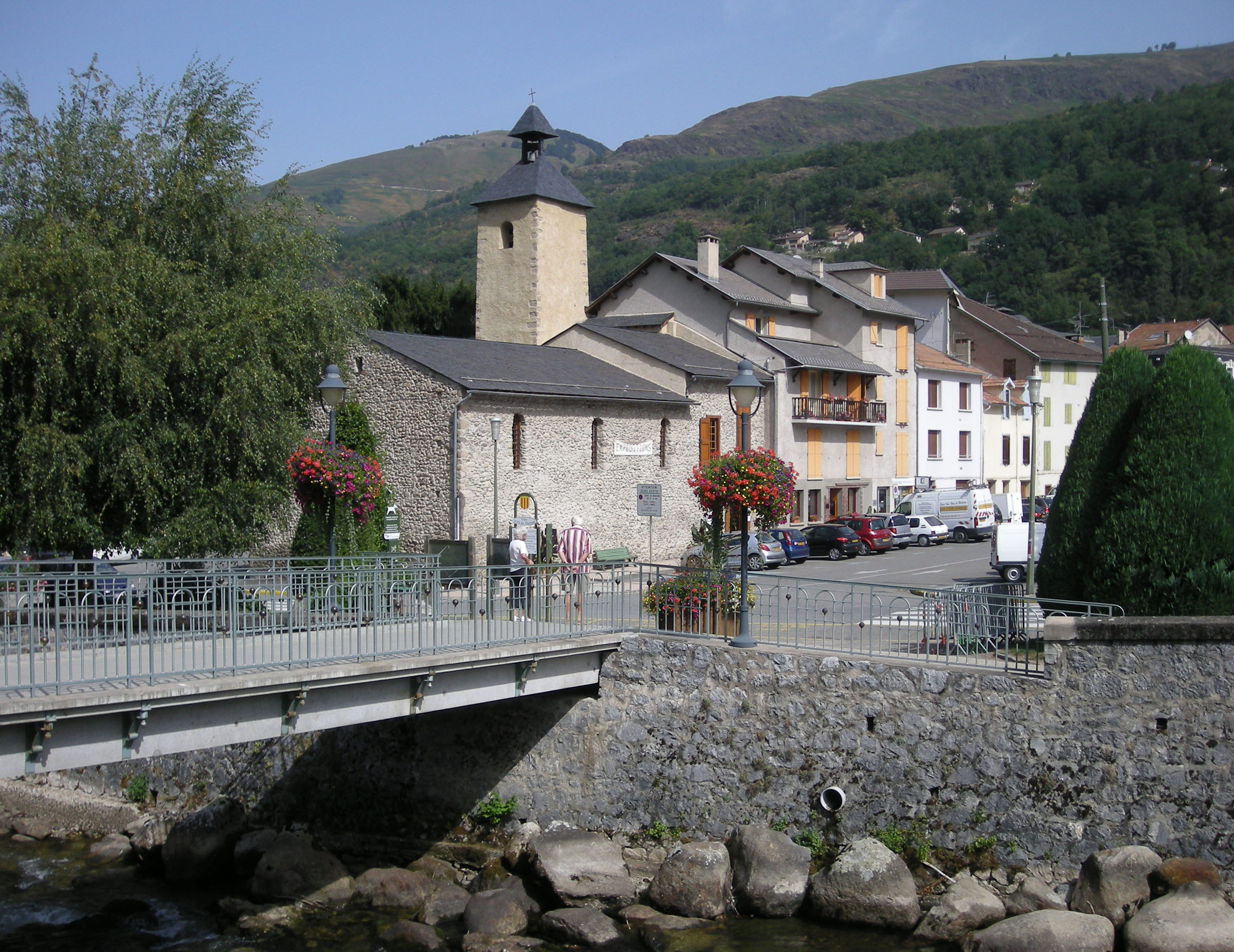
- View towards the town and the Camp de Gramou bridge over the Ariège

- Coat of arms
- Location of Ax-les-Thermes
- Location within France Location within Occitanie
- Coordinates: 42°43′13″N 1°50′23″E
- Country: France
- Region: Occitania
- Department: Ariège
- Arrondissement: Foix
- Canton: Haute-Ariège
- Intercommunality: CC Haute-Ariège

Government
  - Mayor (2020–2026): Dominique Fourcade
- Area^{1}: 30.26 km^{2} (11.68 sq mi)
- Elevation: 720 m (2,360 ft)
- Highest elevation: 2,411 m (7,910 ft)
- Lowest elevation: 697 m (2,287 ft)
- Population (2023): 1,285
  - Density: 42.47/km^{2} (110.0/sq mi)
- Time zone: UTC+01:00 (CET)
  - Summer (DST): UTC+02:00 (CEST)
- INSEE/Postal code: 09032 /09110
- ^{1} French Land Register data, which excludes lakes, ponds, glaciers > 1 km^{2} (0.386 sq mi or 247 acres) and river estuaries.

Ax-les-Thermes (French pronunciation: [aks le tɛʁm]; Occitan: Ax or Acs) is a commune in the Ariège department in the Occitanie region of southwestern France.

The commune has been awarded one flower by the National Council of Towns and Villages in Bloom in the Competition of cities and villages in Bloom.

== Geography ==
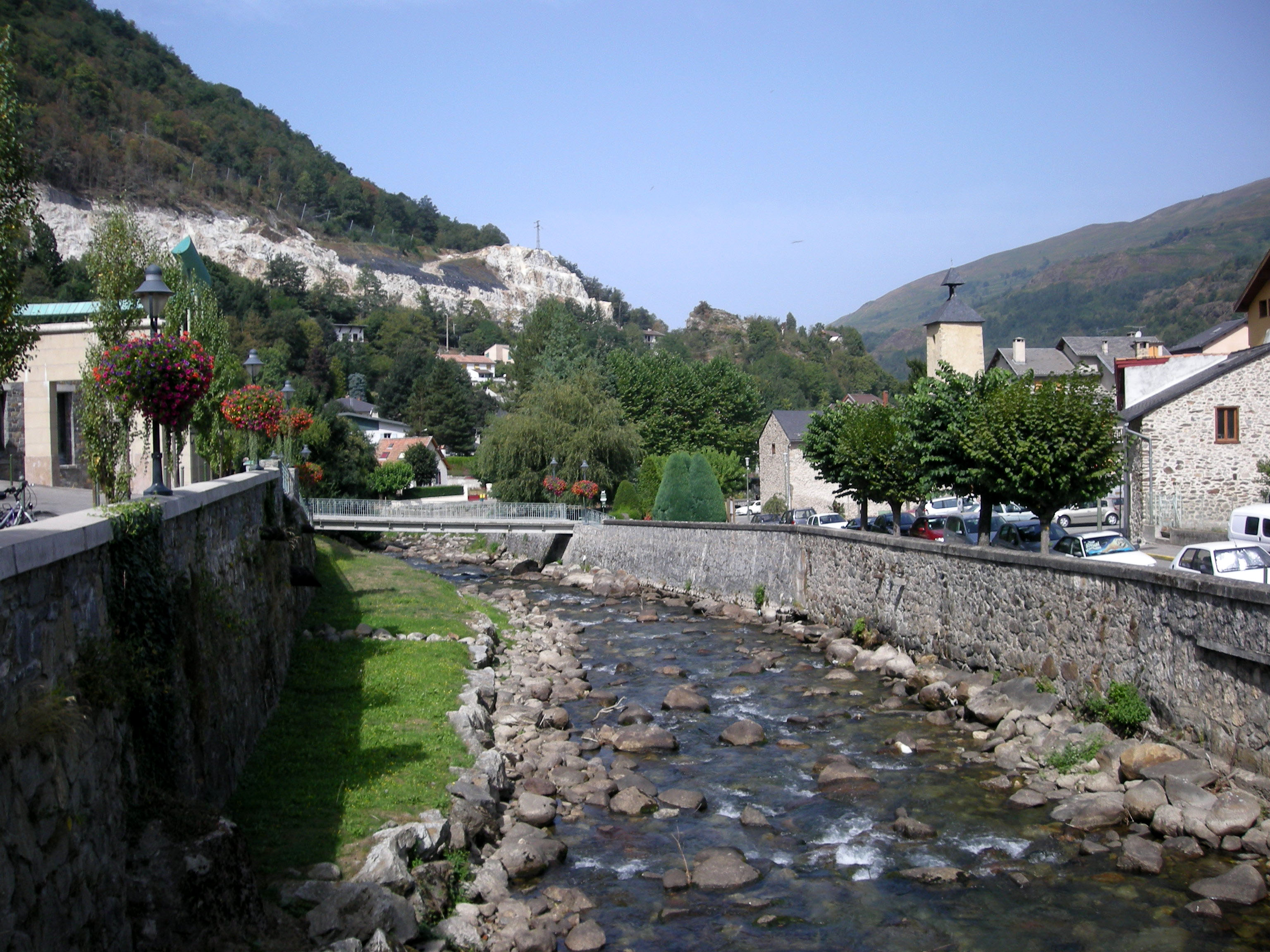
The Oriège at Ax-les-Thermes

Ax-les-Thermes is situated in the Pyrénées, close to Andorra, and stands on the confluence of the Oriège, Ariège and Lauze rivers. some 75 km west of Perpignan and 35 km north-east of Andorra la Vella. Access to the commune is by Route nationale N20 from Garanou in the northwest which passes through the village then south through the commune to Mérens-les-Vals. The D613 goes north from the village to Sorgeat and the D25 branches from this to go east to Ascou and Mijanès. The railway line from Foix passes through the commune with Ax-les-Thermes station just northwest of the village. The line continues south to Merens-les-Vals.

Apart from the village there are the hamlets of Premiere Bazerque, Deuxieme Bazerque, Troisieme Bazerque, Petches, and Ax-Bonascre to the south. The Ax 3 Domaines Ski resort is located at Ax-Bonascre southwest of the village and is accessed by the D82 road from the village. The commune is alpine in nature with extensive forests and rugged terrain.

The Ariège river flows through the commune from south to north at the start of its journey to join the Garonne at Portet-sur-Garonne. The Ruisseau des Estagnols rises in the south of the commune and flows north to join the Ariège in the south of the commune. The Ruisseau de Risl and the Ruisseau de Font Frède both rise in the east of the commune and flow west to join the Ariège. The Oriège flows from the east to join the Ariège in the village and the Lauze flows from the east to join the Ariège just north of the confluence of the Oriège.

== The Spa ==
Ax (from Latin Aquae – water; French Thermes – hot springs), situated at an elevation of 700 metres (2,300 ft), is well known for its sulphurous hot springs (25 to 78 °C or 77 to 172 °F). The waters, which were used by the Romans, were historically claimed to treat rheumatism, skin diseases, and other maladies. The springs were developed in the medieval period on the orders of Saint Louis to treat soldiers returning from the Crusades afflicted with leprosy. From the 19th century, a spa tourism industry developed.

The Bassin des Ladres (Lepers' Pond), in the centre of the commune, is fed by hot springs supplying water from the ground at a temperature of 77 °C. The best known fountain is the "fountain of cannons". A hospital is situated only one metre from the basin. The pond was built by Roger IV, Count of Foix, during the reign of Saint Louis in 1260. Every year on St John's Day the people of Ax-les-Thermes, having been daubed with ashes, bathe in the Lepers' Pond for fun.

== History ==
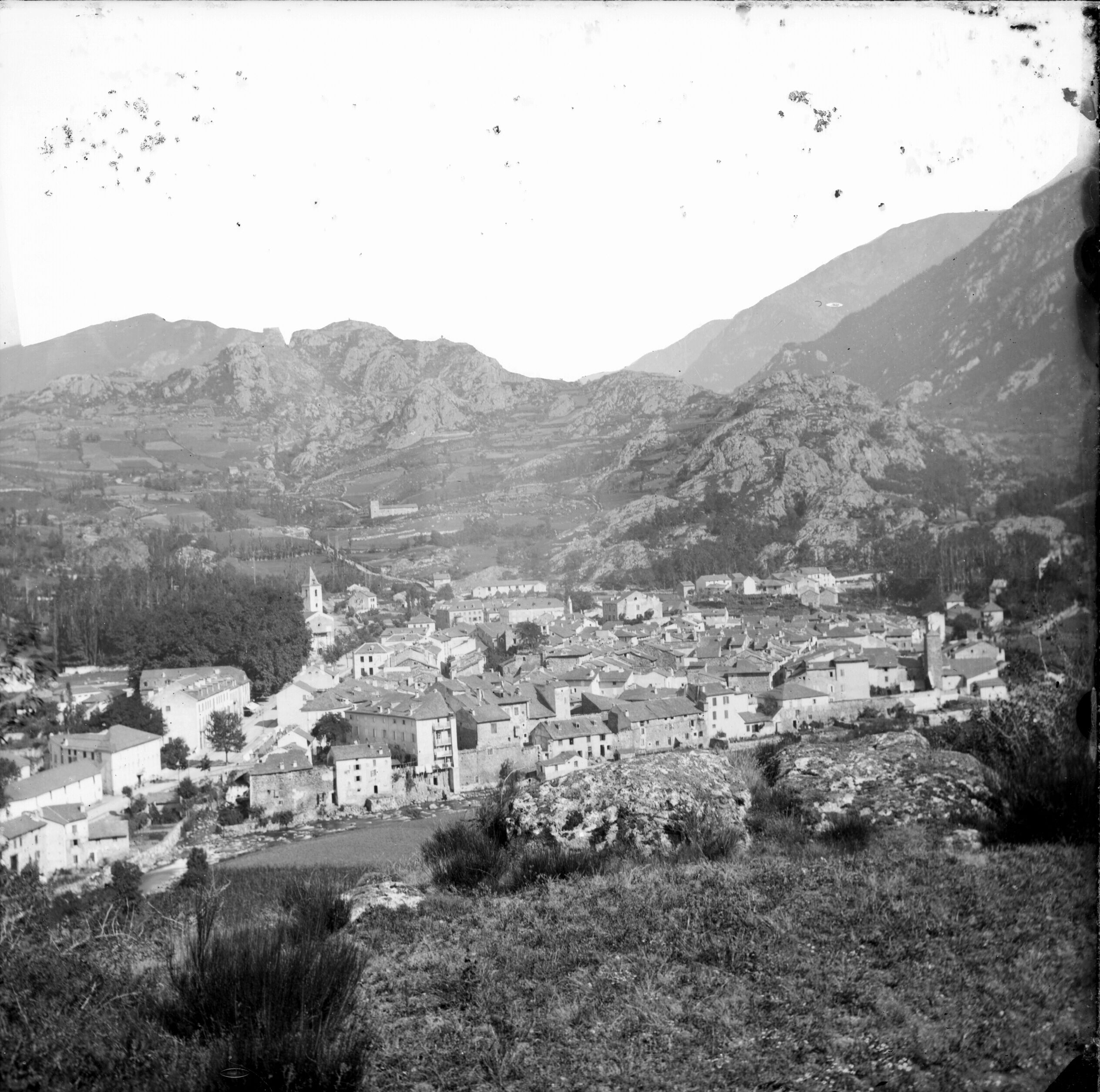
View of the commune in 1910

=== Heraldry ===
Arms of Ax-les-Thermes	These were the arms of Roger IV, Count of Foix, who built a leprosy hospital and the bassin des Ladres in 1260. Blazon: Or, 3 pales of Gules.

== Administration ==
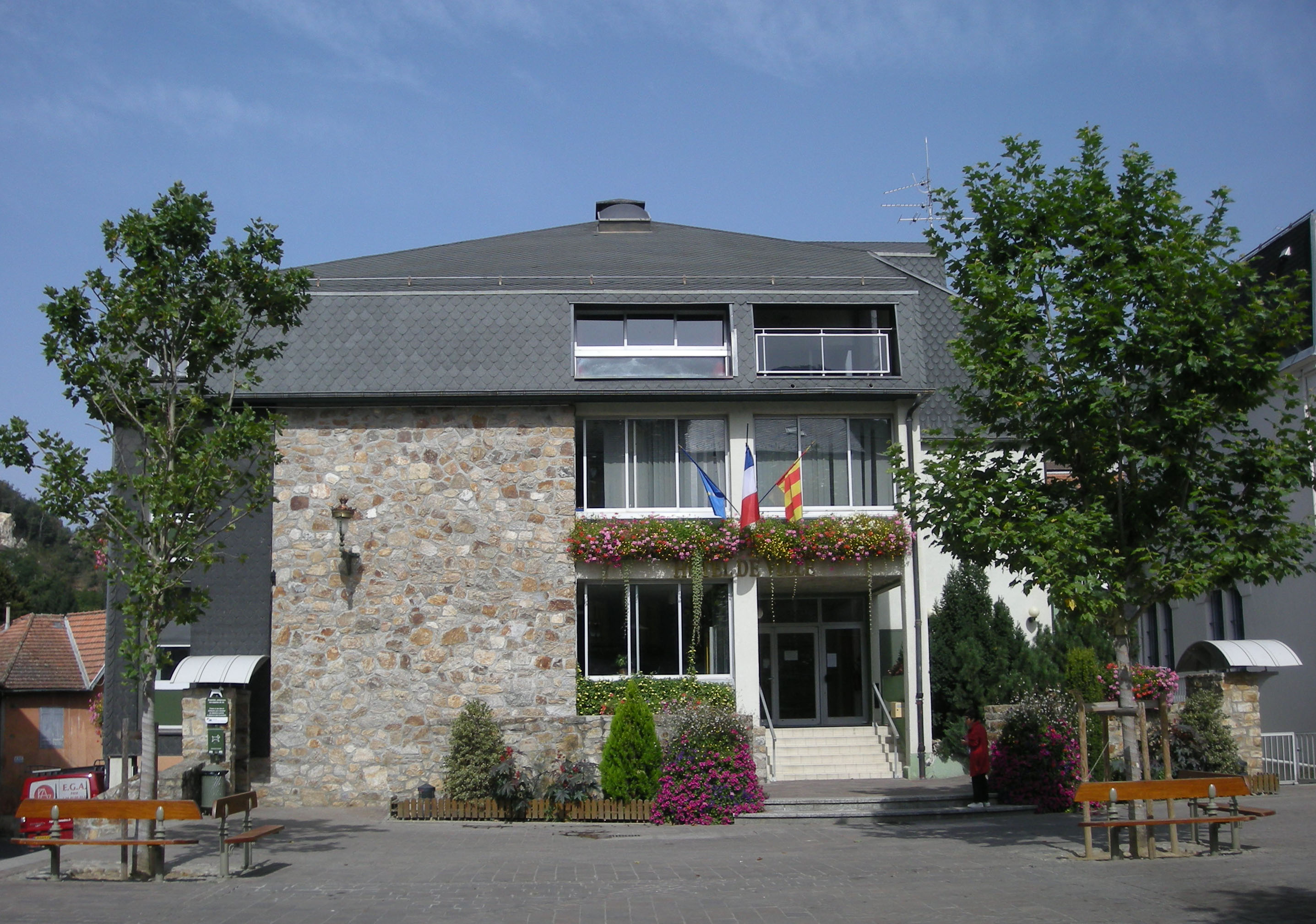
The Town Hall

List of Successive Mayors

From	To	Name
1800	1813	Jean François Gaspard de Fornier de Clauselles
1977	1989	Alain Aybram
1989	1995	Gérard Balista
1995	2001	Augustin Bonrepaux
2001	2008	Alain Chenebeau
2008	2014	Pierre Peyronne
2014	2026	Dominique Fourcade

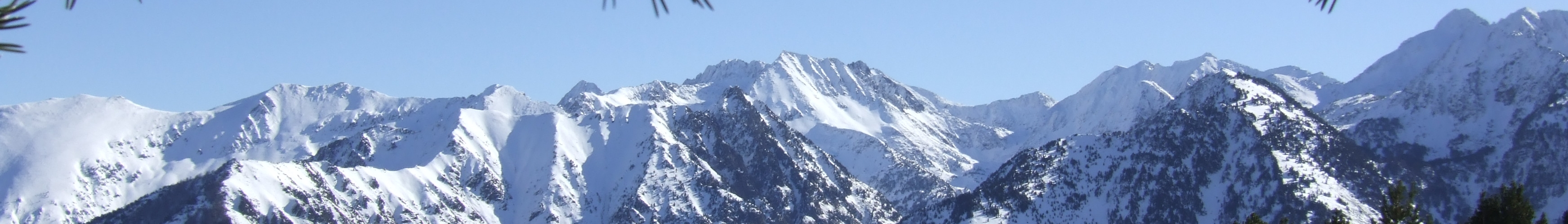
Panorama of Ax-les-Thermes

== Demography ==
The inhabitants of the commune are known as Axéens or Axéennes in French.

Historical population

Year	Pop.	±% p.a.
1793	1,554	—
1800	1,504	−0.47%
1806	1,773	+2.78%
1821	1,863	+0.33%
1831	1,927	+0.34%
1836	1,991	+0.66%
1841	1,908	−0.85%
1846	1,881	−0.28%
1851	1,843	−0.41%
1856	1,710	−1.49%
1861	1,679	−0.37%
1866	1,632	−0.57%
1872	1,693	+0.61%
1876	1,695	+0.03%
1881	1,746	+0.59%
1886	1,813	+0.76%
1891	1,609	−2.36%
1896	1,545	−0.81%
1901	1,503	−0.55%

Year	Pop.	±% p.a.
1906	1,480	−0.31%
1911	1,624	+1.87%
1921	1,563	−0.38%
1926	1,330	−3.18%
1931	1,338	+0.12%
1936	1,312	−0.39%
1946	1,501	+1.35%
1954	1,422	−0.67%
1962	1,628	+1.71%
1968	1,688	+0.61%
1975	1,562	−1.10%
1982	1,478	−0.79%
1990	1,489	+0.09%
1999	1,441	−0.36%
2007	1,467	+0.22%
2012	1,318	−2.12%
2017	1,267	−0.79%
2023	1,285	+0.24%

Source: EHESS and INSEE

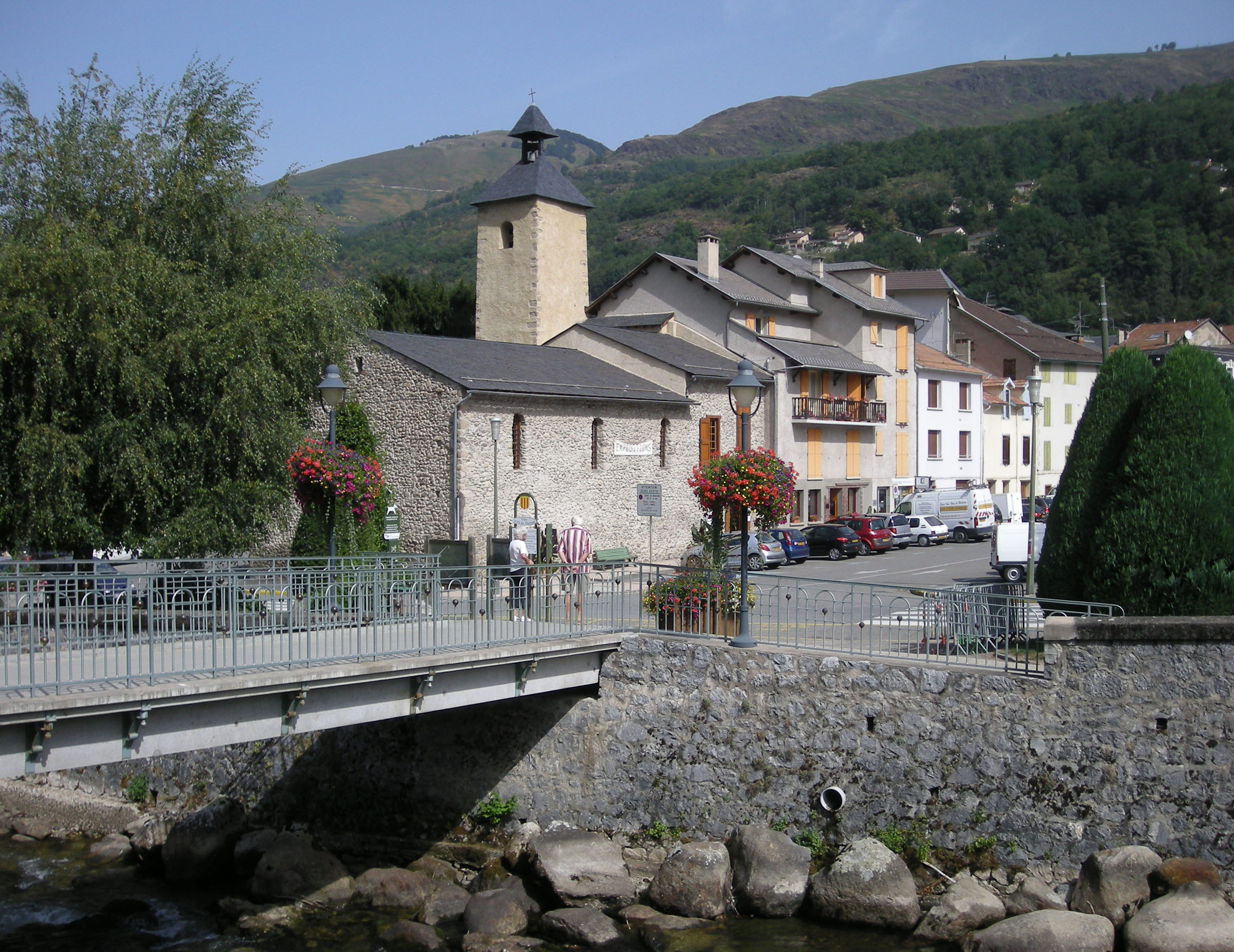
The bridge in the town

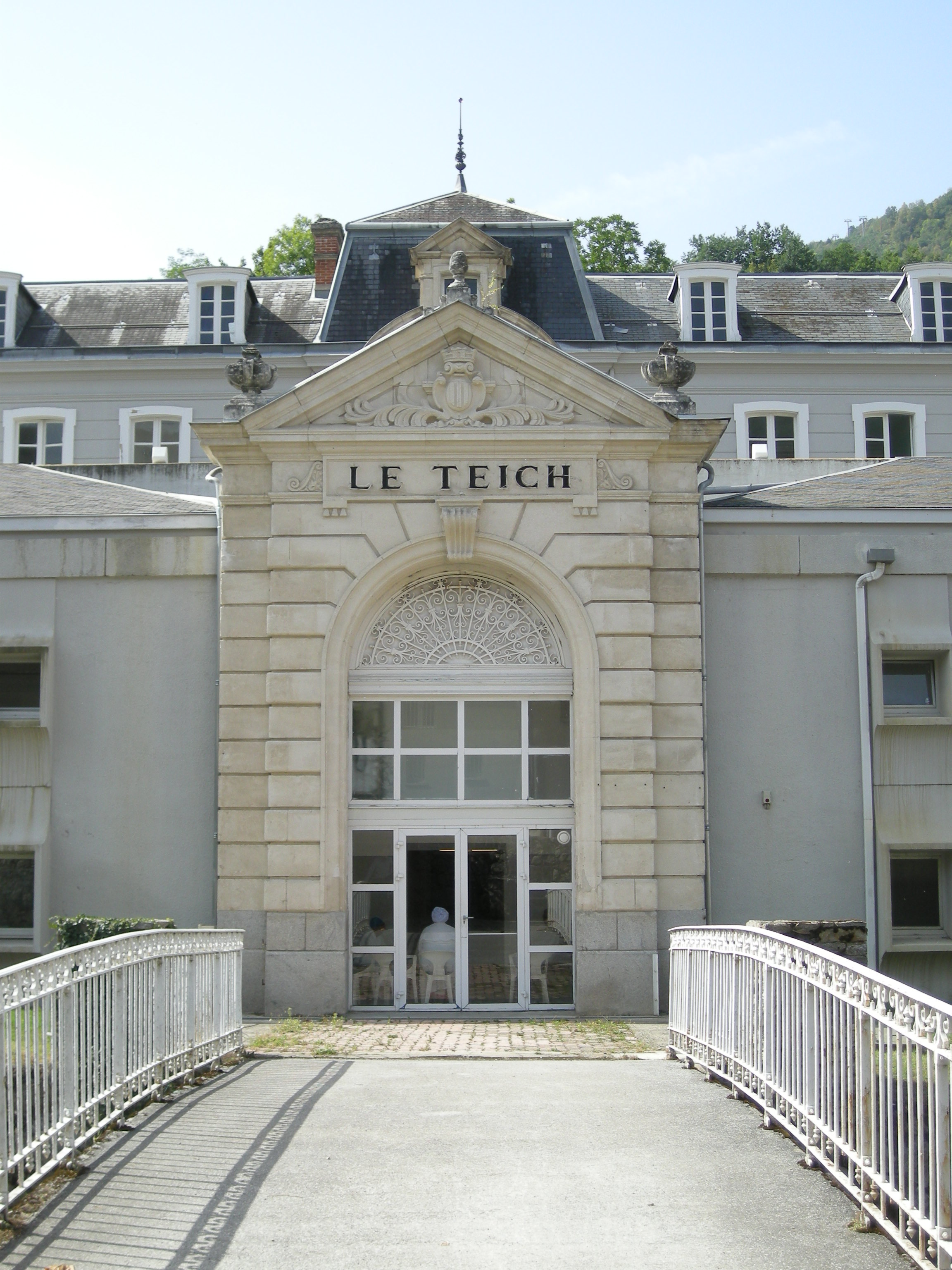
Le Teich Thermal Spa

== Economy ==
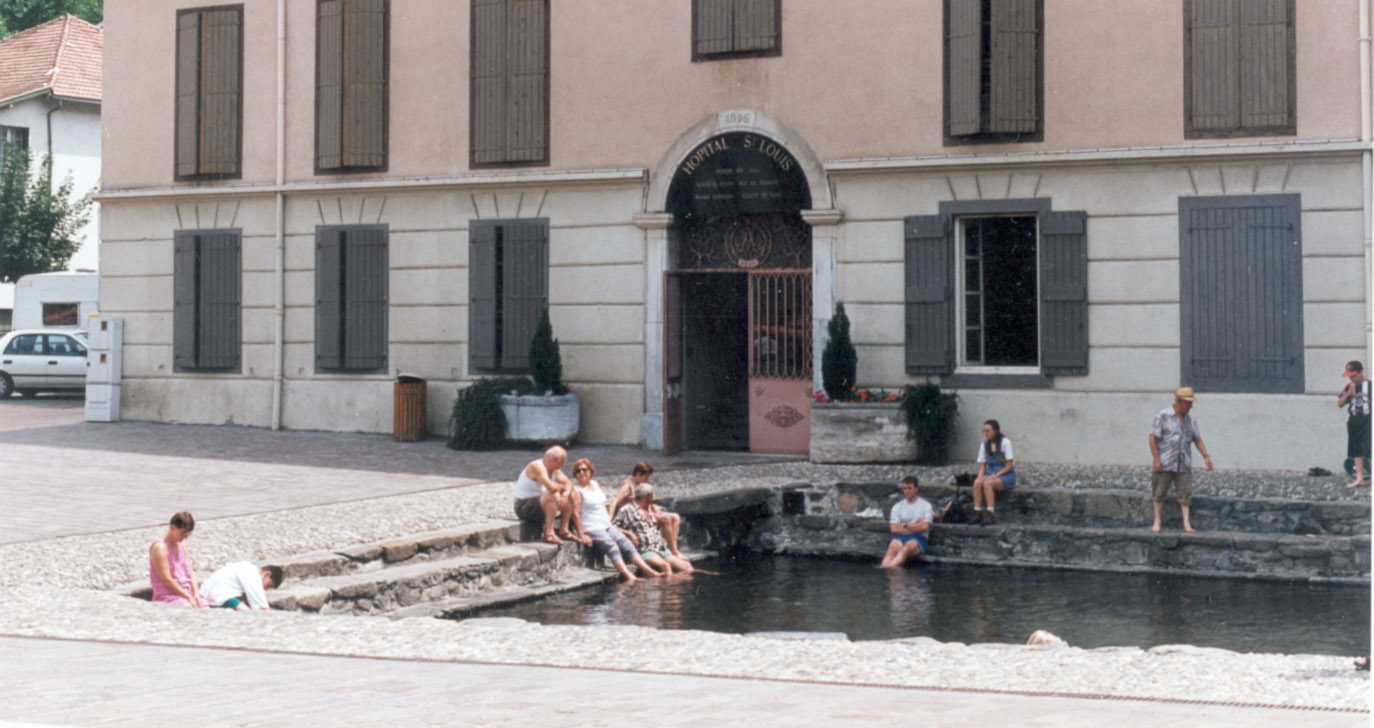
The "Lepers' Pond" in Ax-les-Thermes, fed by hot springs

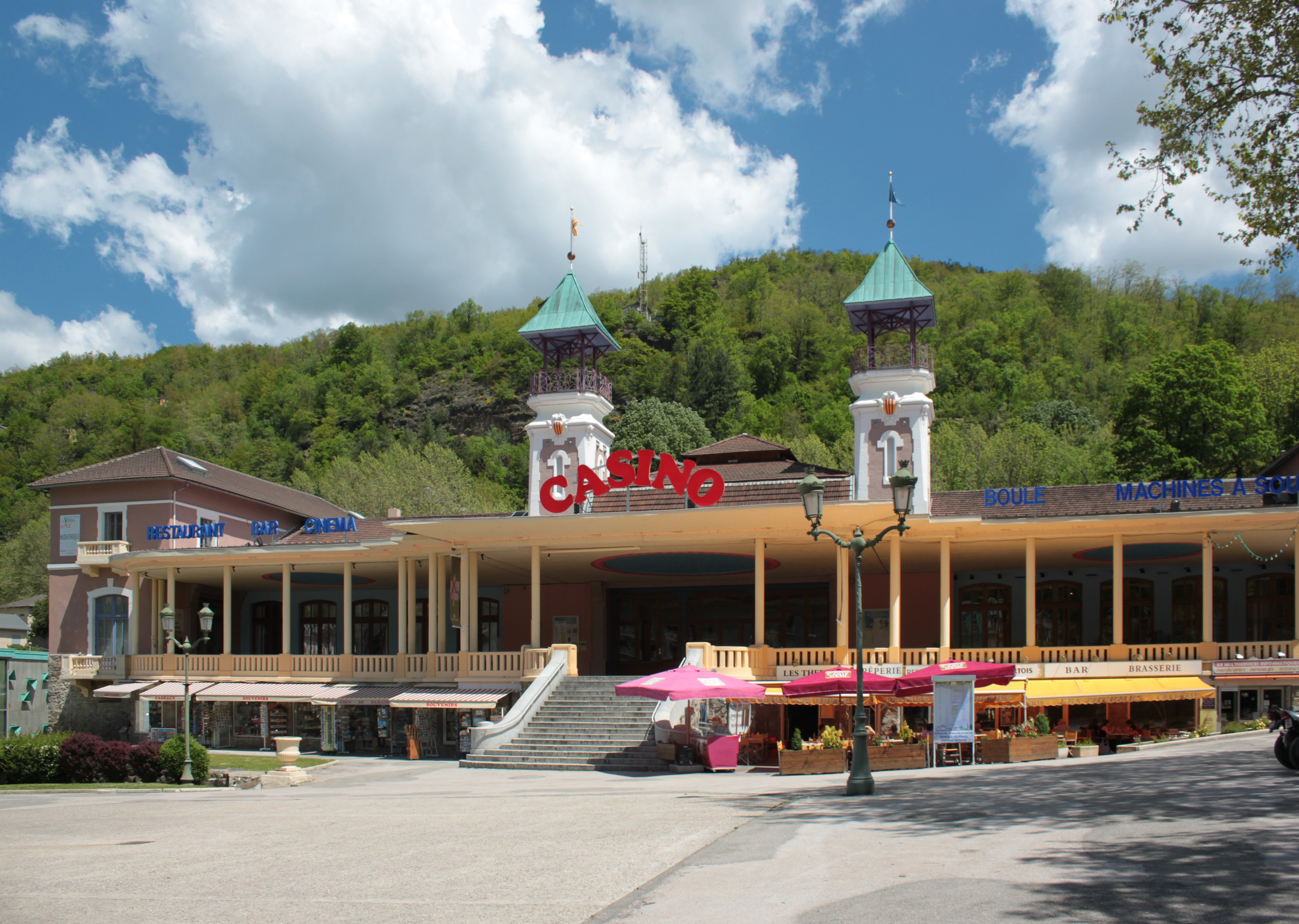
The casino

Local economic activity is based mainly on livestock (cattle and sheep), Hydrotherapy (there are 60 sources at temperatures ranging from 18 to 78 °C, feeding three spas: Couloubret, Modèle, and Teich. The waters treat especially sciatica, rheumatism and certain respiratory diseases), winter sports, and tourism in general. Its proximity to Andorra enables cross-border shopping. The Ax 3 Domaines winter sports resort is situated in the commune and served as the finish line for stage 14 of the 2010 Tour de France.

== Culture and heritage ==
=== Civil heritage ===
The commune has two sites that are registered as historical monuments:

- The Bassin des Ladres (Lepers' Pond) (13th century) is fed by hot spring water at a temperature of 77 °C.
- The Teich Park Ornamental Garden (1838)

Picture Gallery

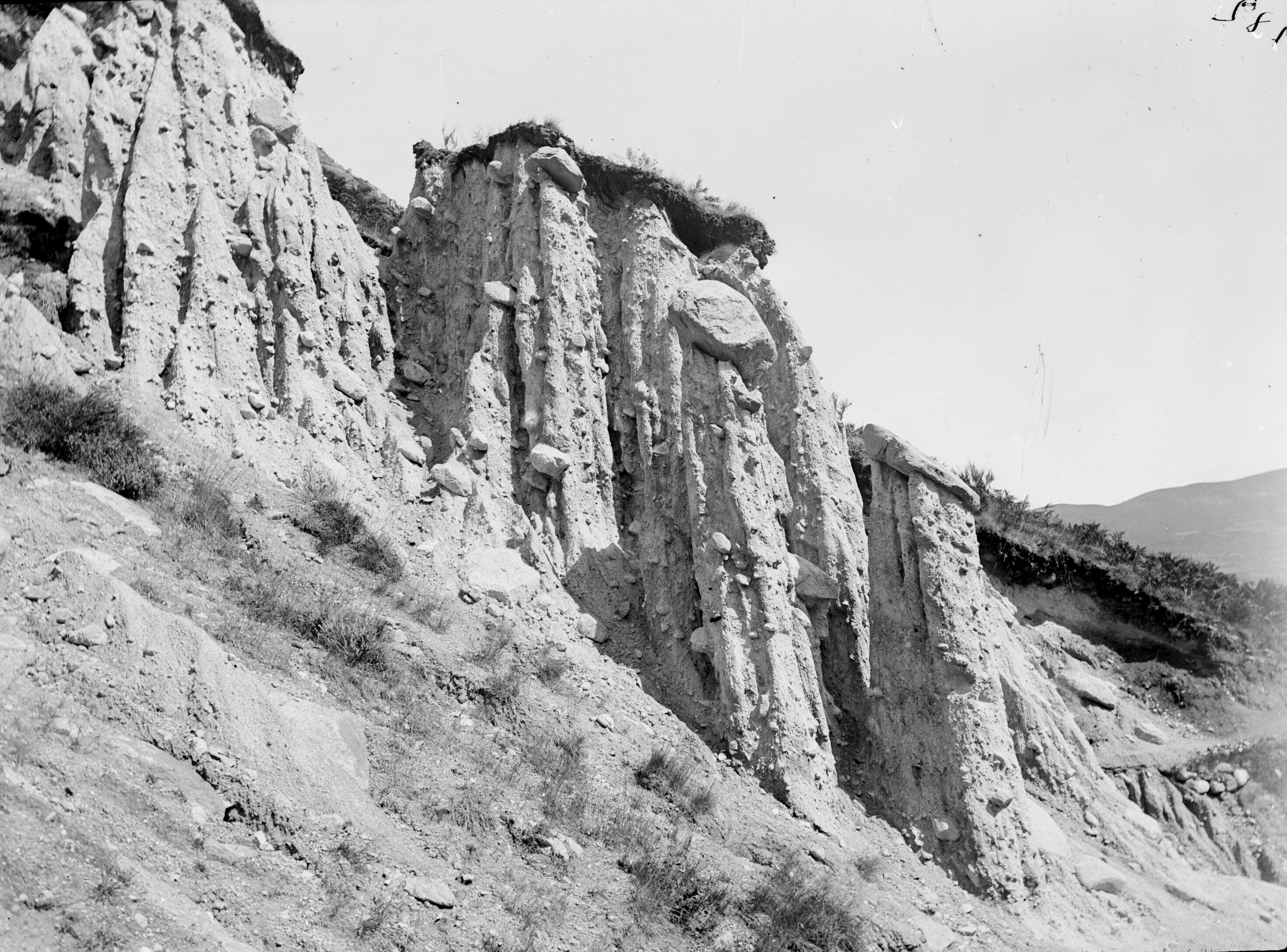
The Demoiselles de Castelet in the 19th century

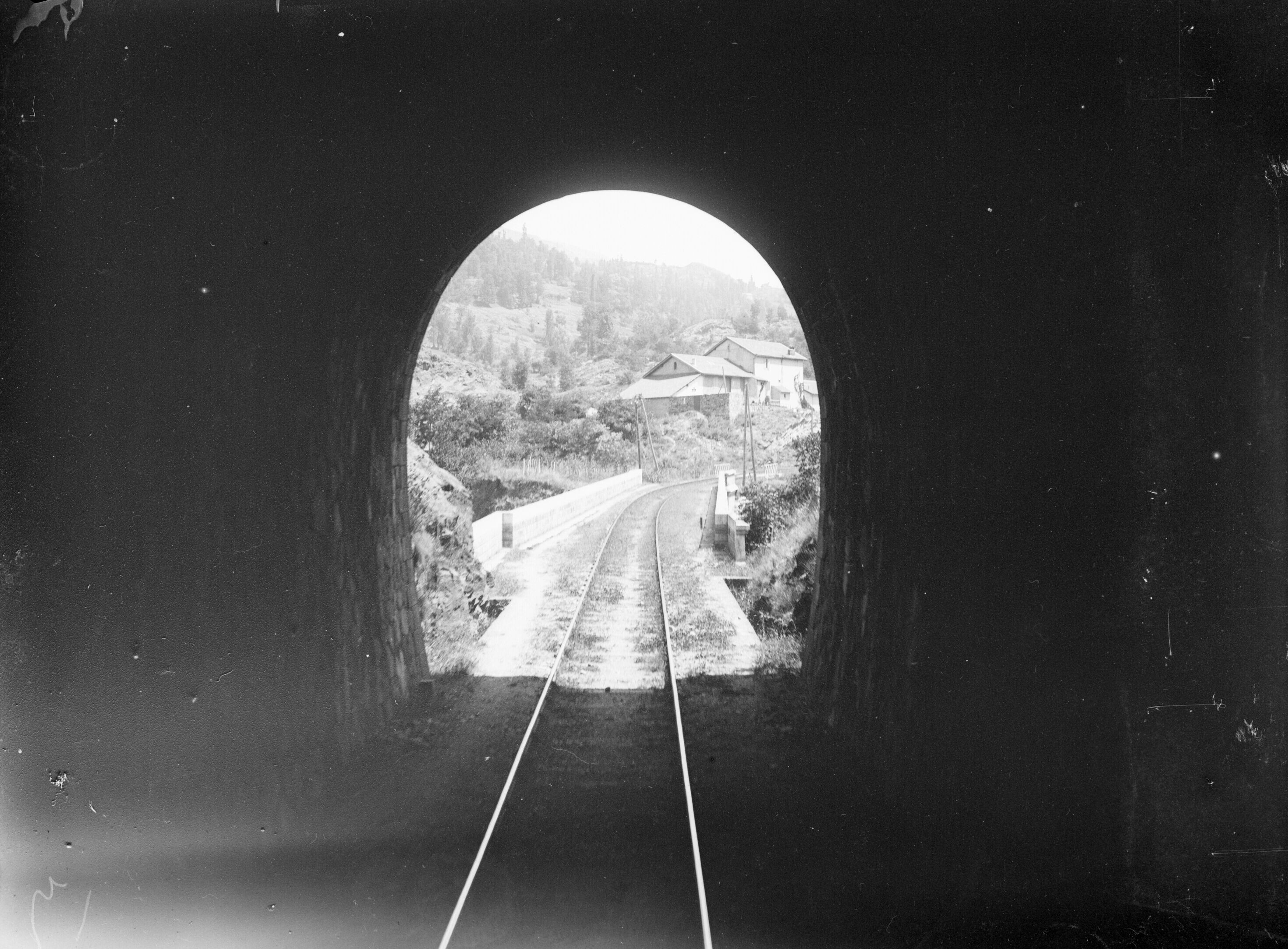
Railway tunnel at Ax-les-Thermes 1906

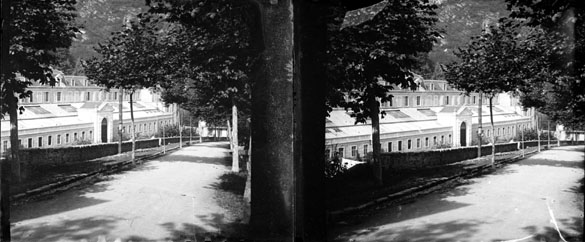
The Baths of Teich 1905

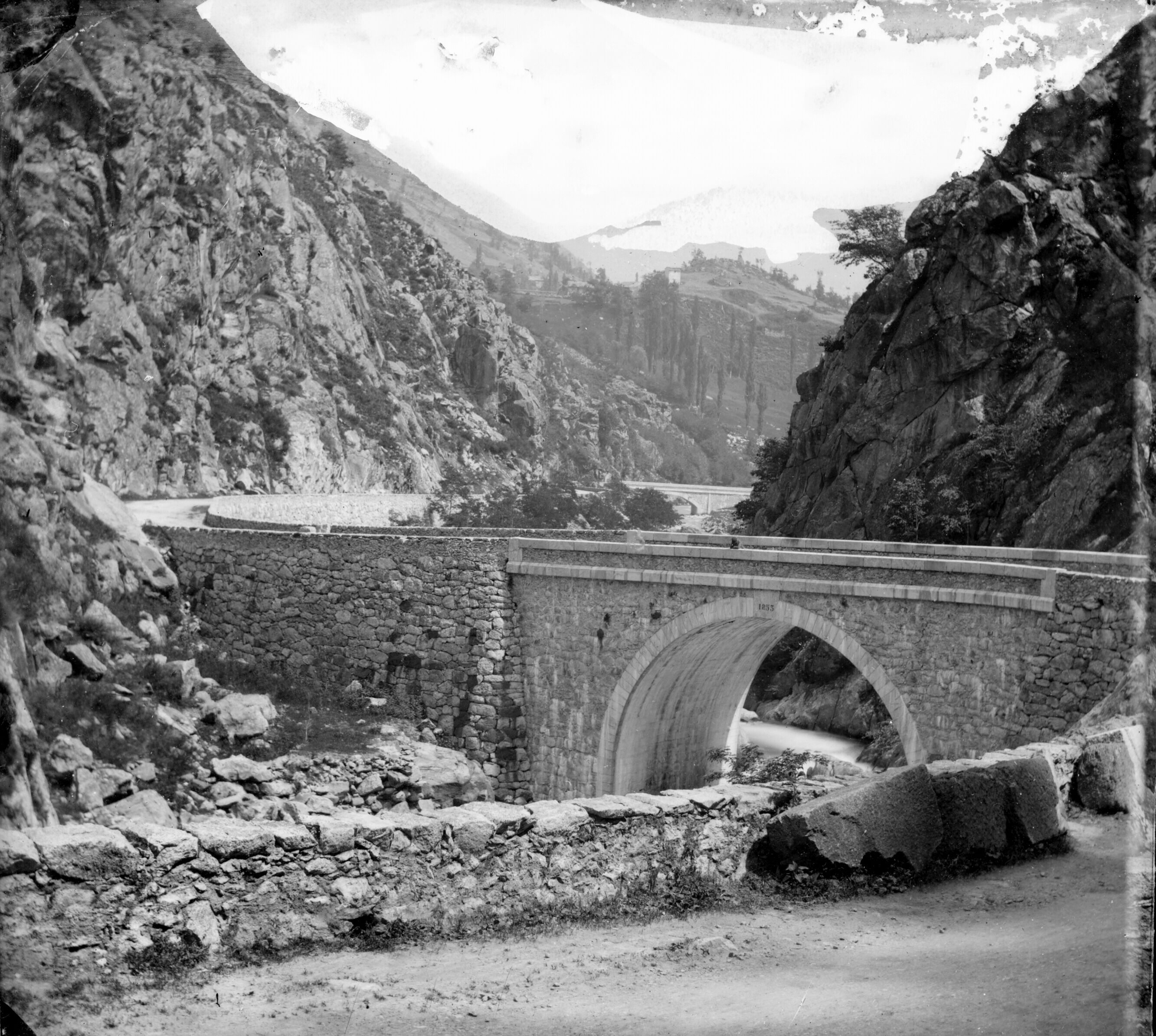
The Berduquety Gorge (19th century)

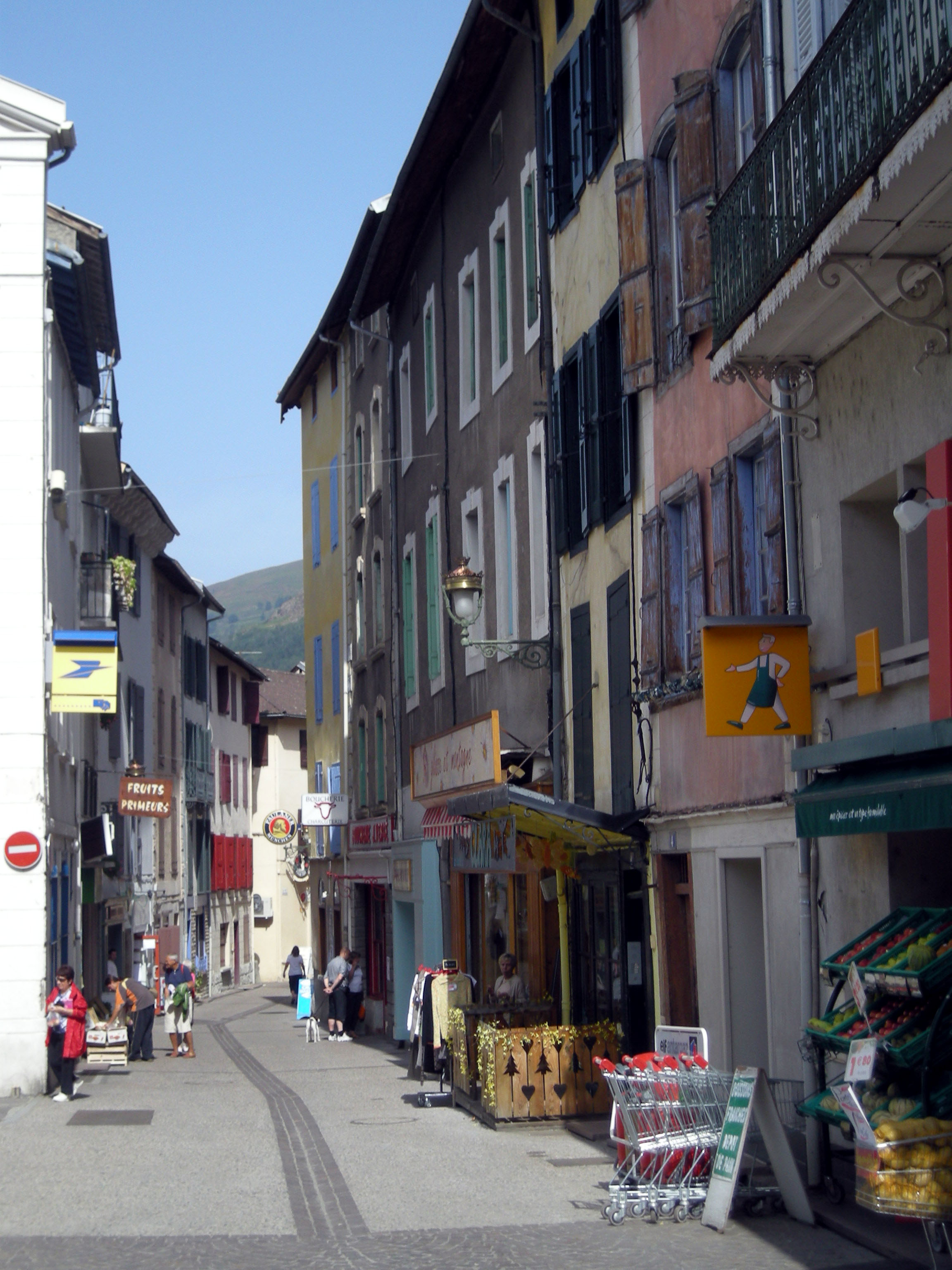
A street in the town

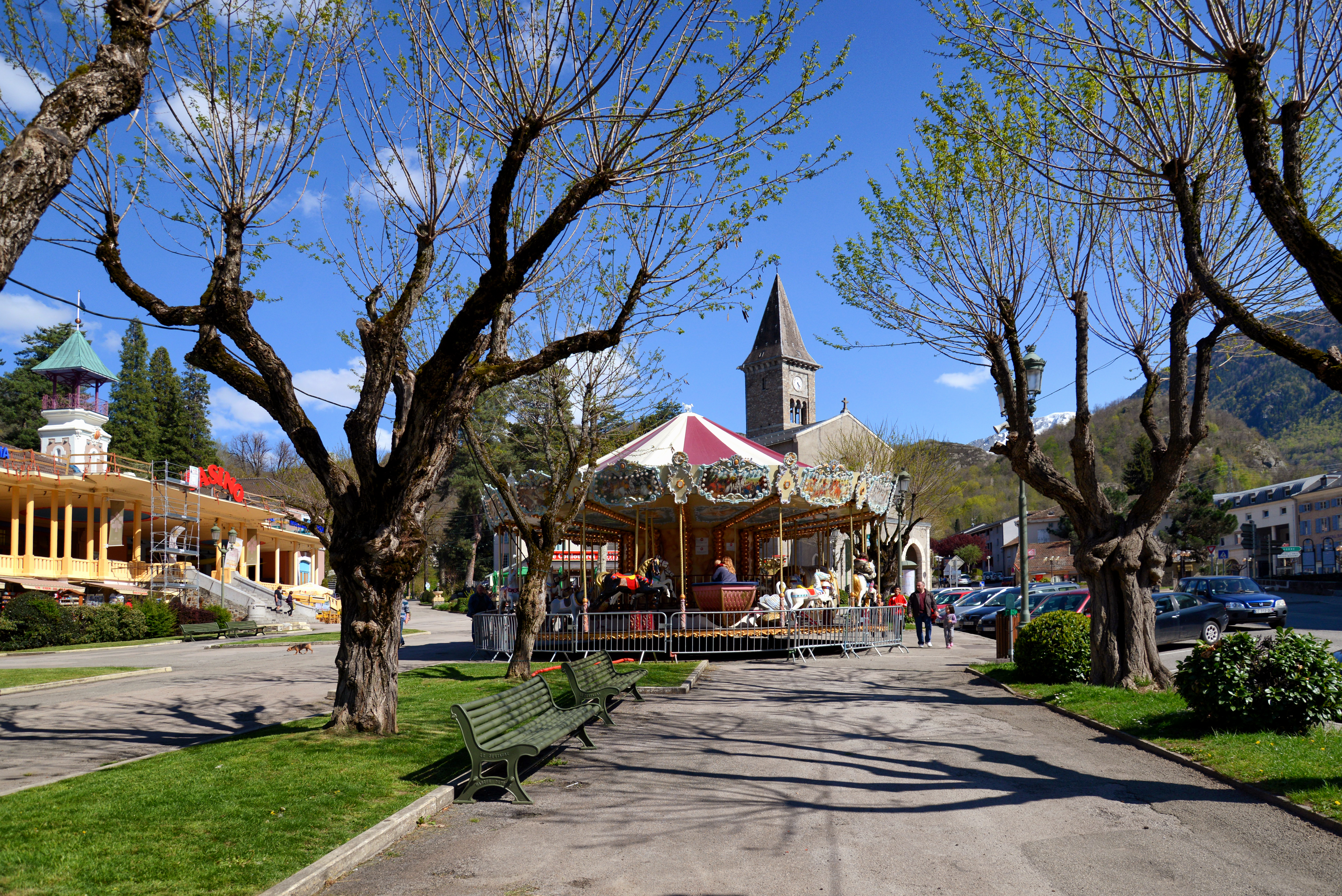
The Village Centre

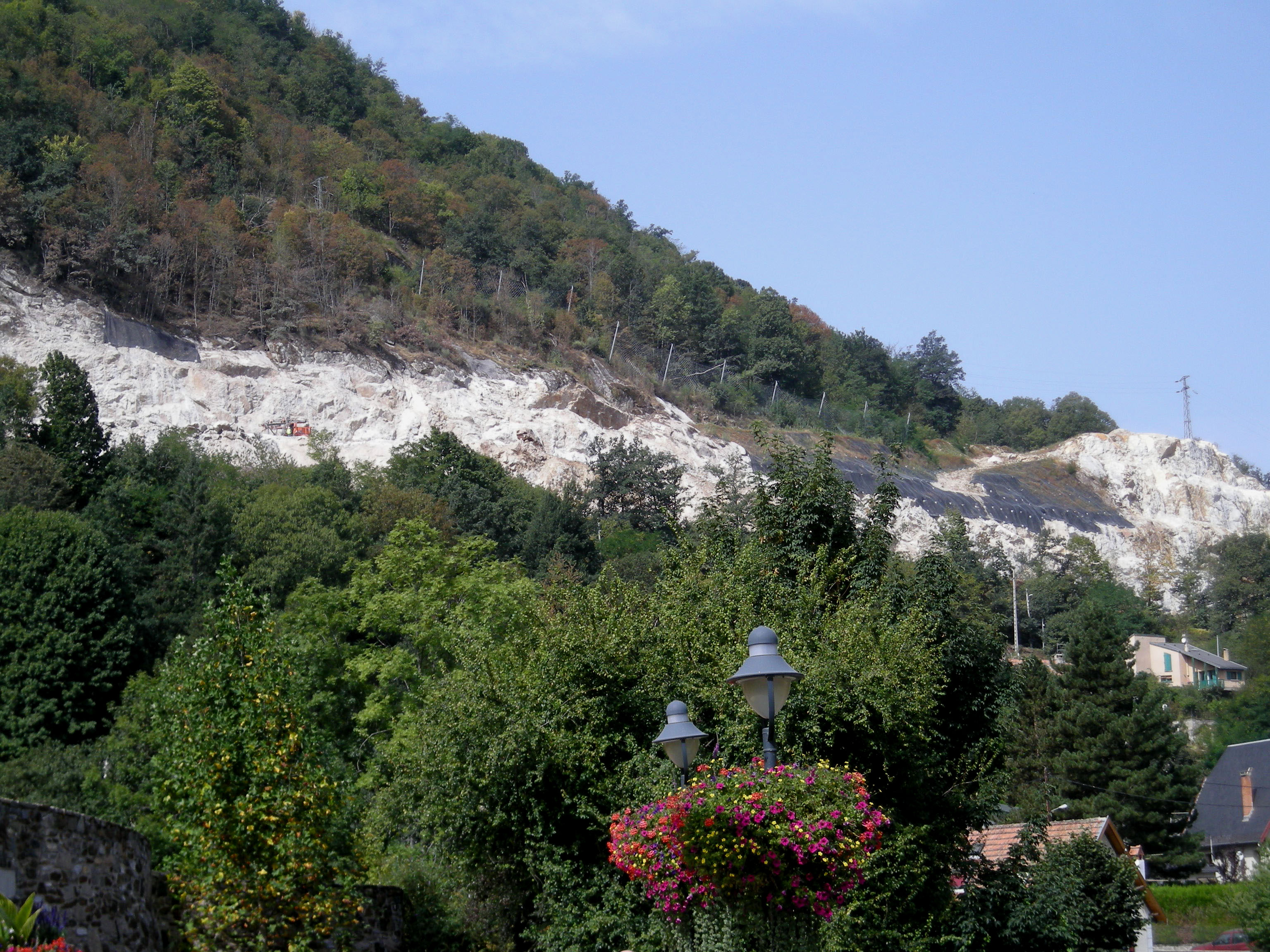
The Quarry

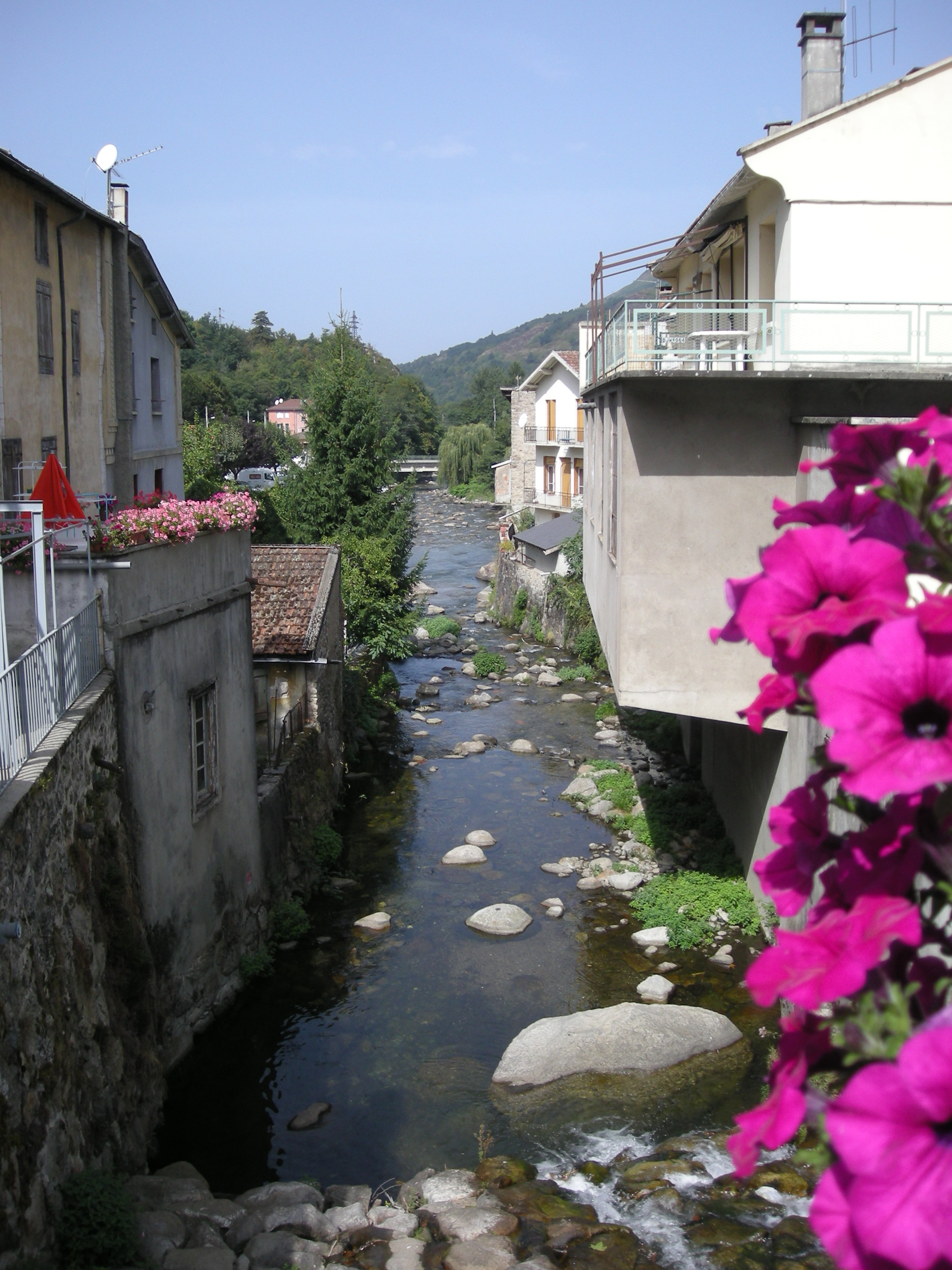
The Lauze in Ax-les-Thermes

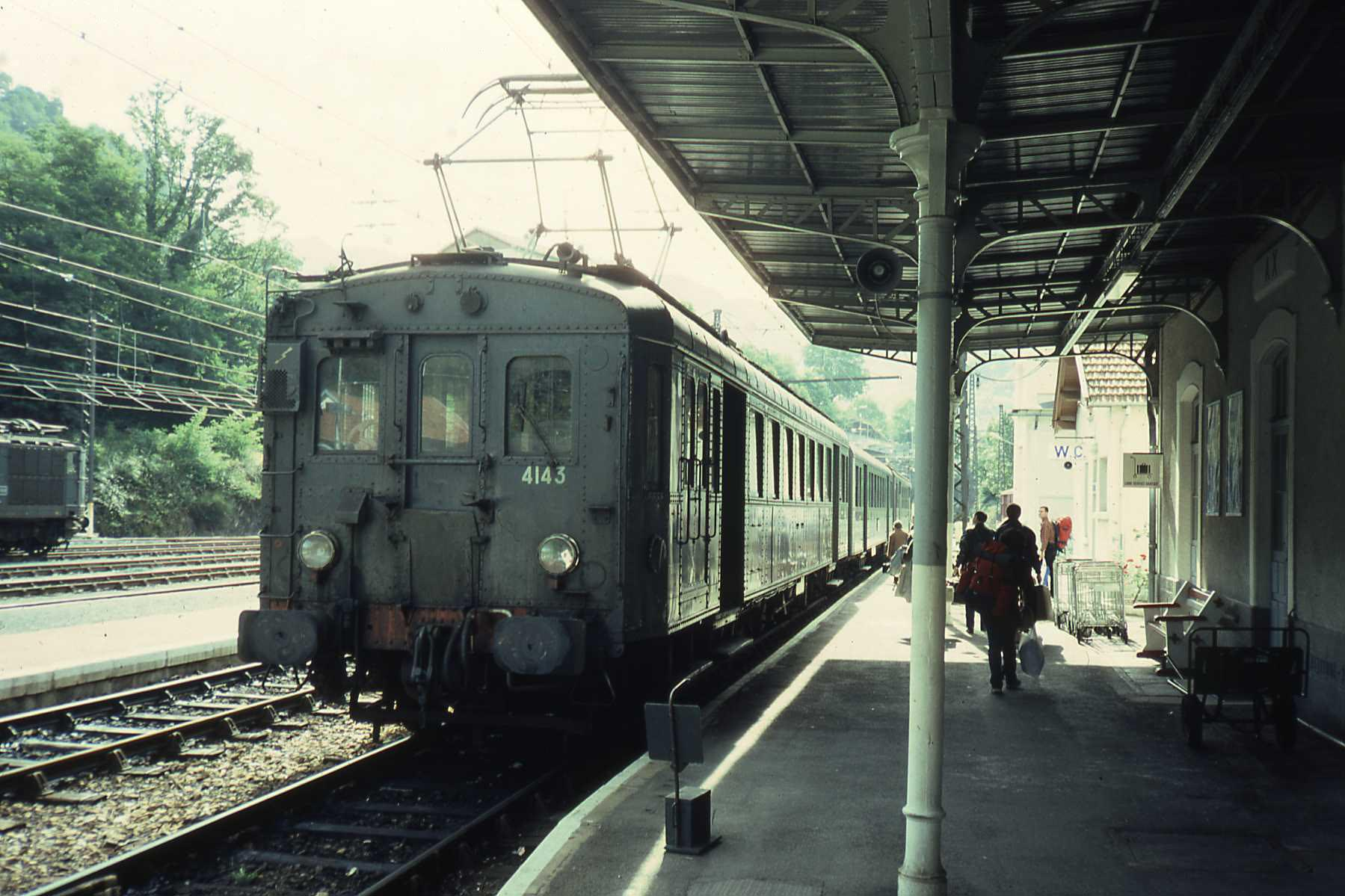
A train at Ax-les-Thermes in 1981

=== Religious heritage ===
- The Church of Saint-Jerome (formerly the Chapel of the Blue Penitents) contains several items that are registered as historical objects:
  - An Altar Painting: Christ on the Cross (1841)
  - The Choir Enclosure (18th century)
  - The Front of the Altar (18th century)
  - A Tabernacle and 6 statuettes (18th century)
  - The Altar, Retable, 2 statues, Painting: Saint Jerome, Saint Madeleine, Christ on the Cross (18th century)
- The Church of Saint-Vincent contains several items that are registered as historical objects:
  - A Chalice (16th century)
  - A Crucifix from the Blue Penitents (1650)
  - A Chalice (16th century)
  - A Painting: Saint Vincent in Ecstasy (18th century)
  - A Bronze Bell (1512)
  - A Painting: The mystical marriage of Saint Catherine (17th century)
  - A Painting: Christ on the Cross with Saint Madeleine and the Virgin at his feet (1875)

== Notable people linked to the commune ==
- Saint Udaut (405–452), priest and martyr
- Peire Autier, Albigensian leader
- Louis Gareau (1769–1813), General of the Armies of the Republic and the Empire
- Émilien Dumas (1804–1873), palaeontologist and geologist, died in Ax-les-Thermes
- Gatien Marcailhou (1807–1855), composer and "inventor" of the waltz. He was the first teacher of Gabriel Fauré. His most famous composition, Indiana, inspired Camille Claudel in his group La Valse.
- Pierre Bertrand de Mérignon

== See also ==
- Communes of the Ariège department
