= Ascou =

Commune in Occitanie, France

- Commune
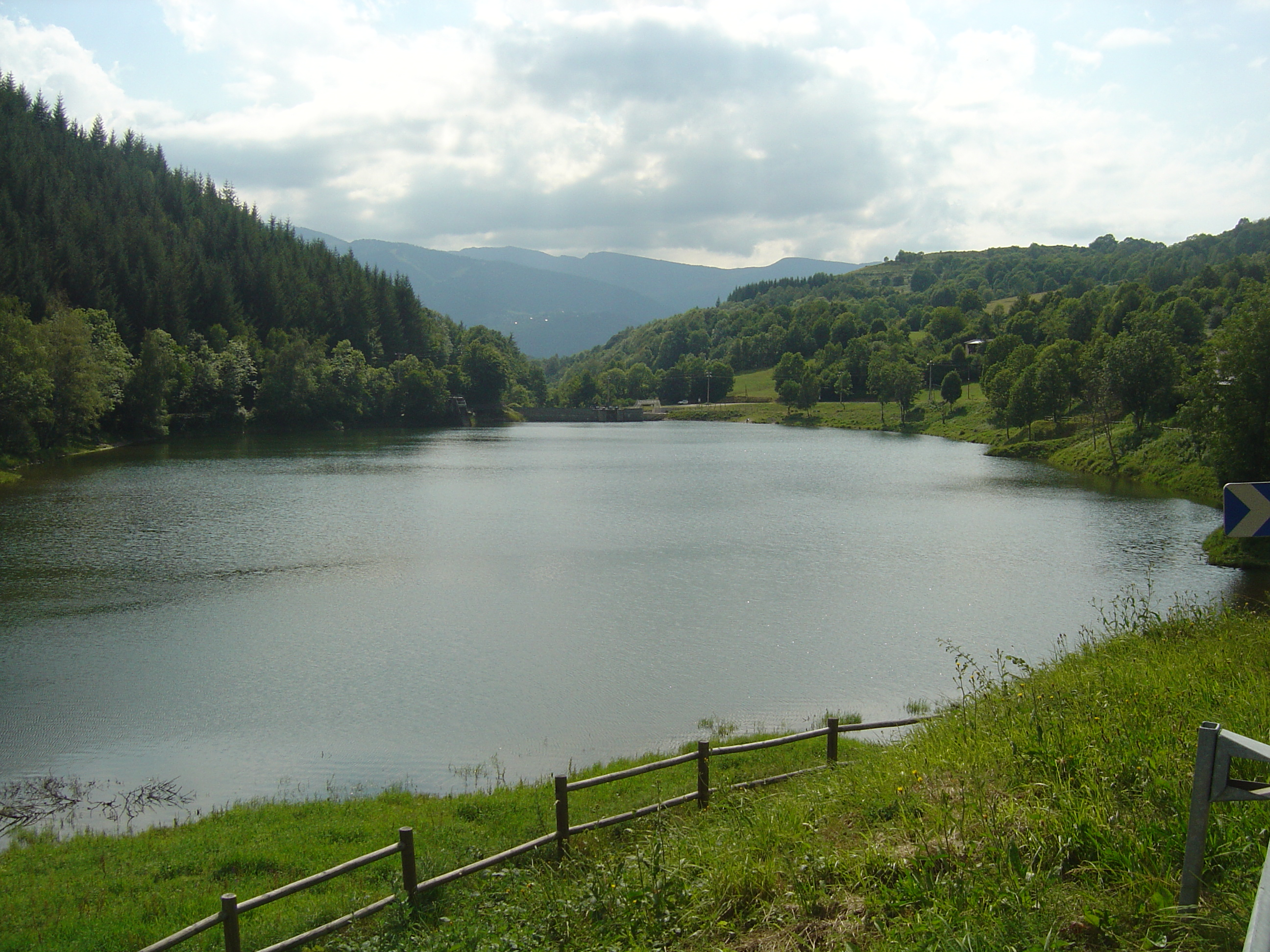
- The Étang de Goulours
- Location of Ascou
- Location within France Location within Occitanie
- Coordinates: 42°43′20″N 1°51′45″E
- Country: France
- Region: Occitania
- Department: Ariège
- Arrondissement: Foix
- Canton: Haute-Ariège
- Intercommunality: CC Haute-Ariège

Government
  - Mayor (2020–2026): Sabine Carrière
- Area^{1}: 35.59 km^{2} (13.74 sq mi)
- Elevation: 1,005 m (3,297 ft)
- Highest elevation: 2,360 m (7,740 ft)
- Lowest elevation: 879 m (2,884 ft)
- Population (2023): 113
  - Density: 3.18/km^{2} (8.22/sq mi)
- Time zone: UTC+01:00 (CET)
  - Summer (DST): UTC+02:00 (CEST)
- INSEE/Postal code: 09023 /09110
- ^{1} French Land Register data, which excludes lakes, ponds, glaciers > 1 km^{2} (0.386 sq mi or 247 acres) and river estuaries.

Ascou (French pronunciation: [asku]; Occitan: Ascon) is a commune in the Ariège department in the Occitanie region of south-western France.

== Geography ==
Ascou is an alpine commune located some 40 km south-east of Foix and immediately east of Ax-les-Thermes. The northern border of the commune is the border between the departments of Ariège and Aude. Access to the commune is by the D 25 road which branches off the D 613 east of Ax-les-Thermes and continues through the village and the length of the commune to Mijanès over the mountains to the east. The D 258 road branches off the D 25 in the commune and goes north-east changing to the D 107 at the border and continuing to La Fajolle. Apart from the village there are the hamlets of Goulours, Lavail, and Pujal. The commune is entirely alpine in nature with no farmland.

The Ruisseau de l'Adorre rises in the east of the commune and flows west gathering tributaries and changing to the Lauze river before passing the village and continuing west to join the Ariège at Ax-les-Thermes. The Ruisseau de l'Eycherque rise in the north-east of the commune and flows south-west to join the Lauze at the D 25 road. The Riu Caud flows from the north to join the Lauze at the Étang de Goulours

== Administration ==
List of Successive Mayors

From	To	Name	Party
2001	2020	Claude Carrière	PS
2020	2026	Sabine Carrière	

== Demography ==
The inhabitants of the commune are known as Ascounais in French.

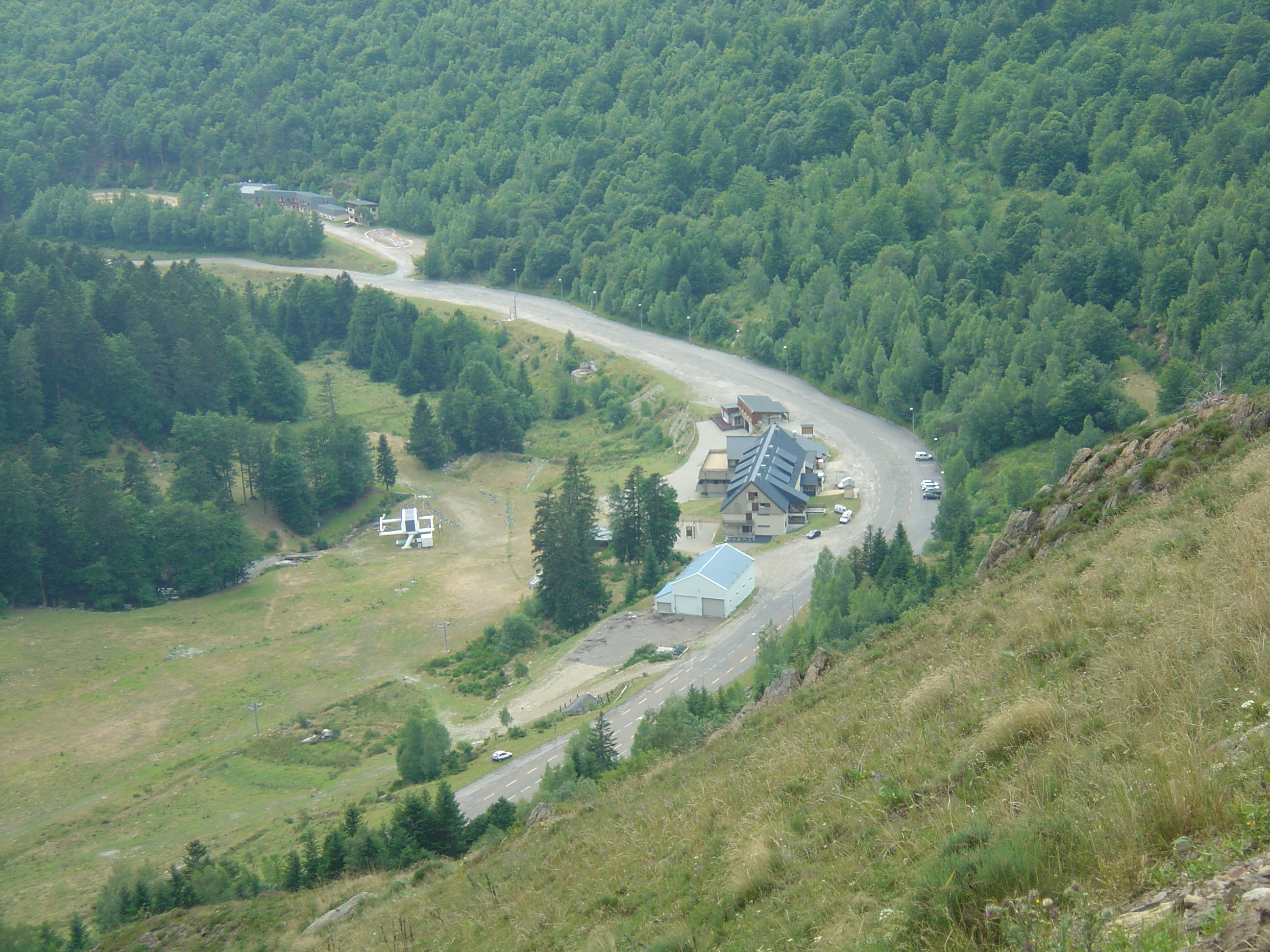
Pailhères ski station in summer

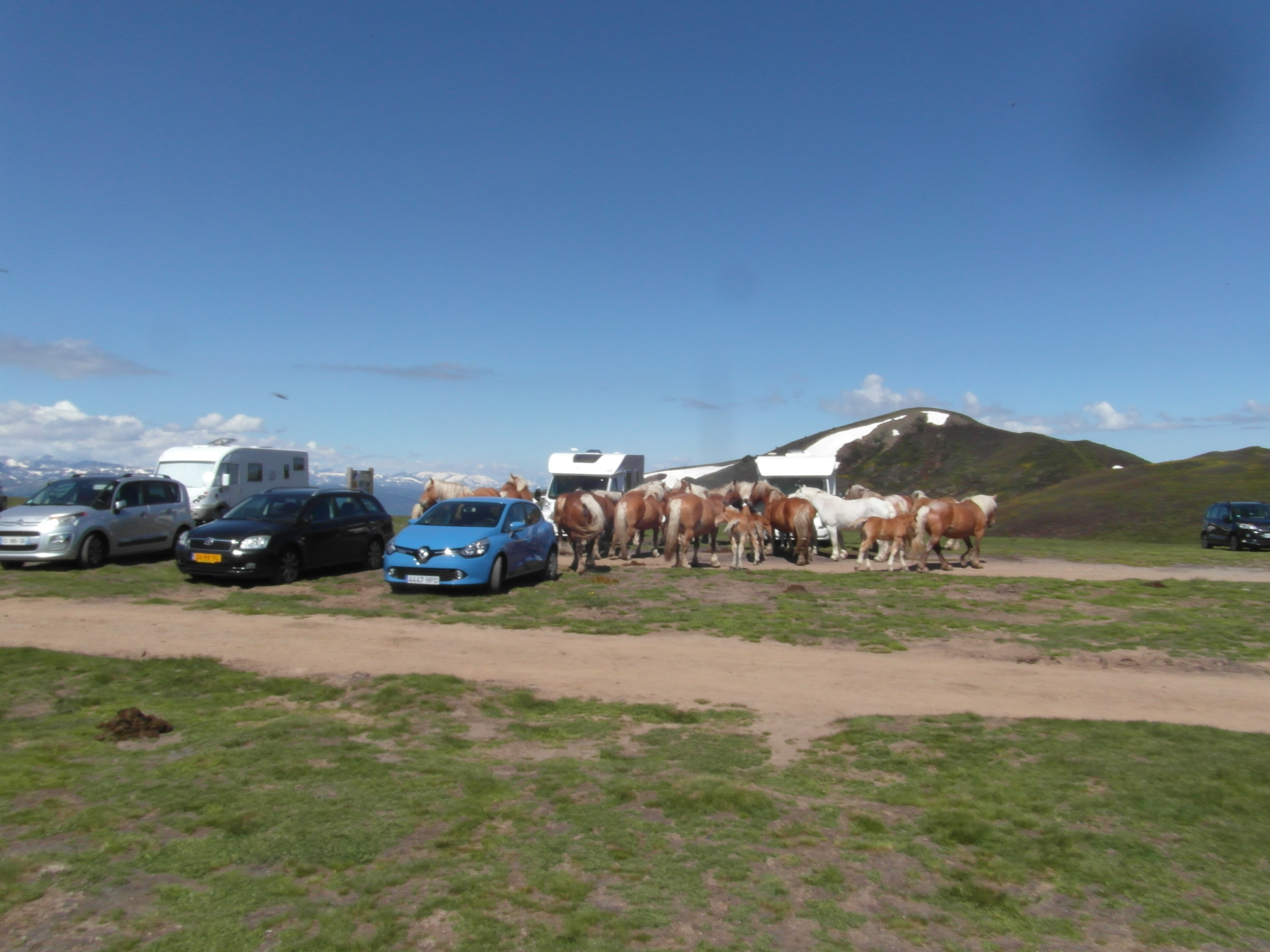
The Col de Pailhères on the D25

Historical population

Year	Pop.	±% p.a.
1793	776	—
1800	613	−3.31%
1806	851	+5.62%
1821	914	+0.48%
1831	925	+0.12%
1836	1,001	+1.59%
1841	837	−3.52%
1846	842	+0.12%
1851	805	−0.89%
1856	686	−3.15%
1861	710	+0.69%
1866	695	−0.43%
1872	664	−0.76%
1876	641	−0.88%
1881	565	−2.49%
1886	620	+1.88%
1891	521	−3.42%
1896	521	+0.00%
1901	469	−2.08%

Year	Pop.	±% p.a.
1906	456	−0.56%
1911	453	−0.13%
1921	363	−2.19%
1926	310	−3.11%
1931	266	−3.02%
1936	250	−1.23%
1946	274	+0.92%
1954	158	−6.65%
1962	136	−1.86%
1968	114	−2.90%
1975	120	+0.74%
1982	81	−5.46%
1990	96	+2.15%
1999	102	+0.68%
2007	127	+2.78%
2012	153	+3.80%
2017	121	−4.58%
2023	113	−1.13%

Source: EHESS and INSEE

== Sites and monuments ==
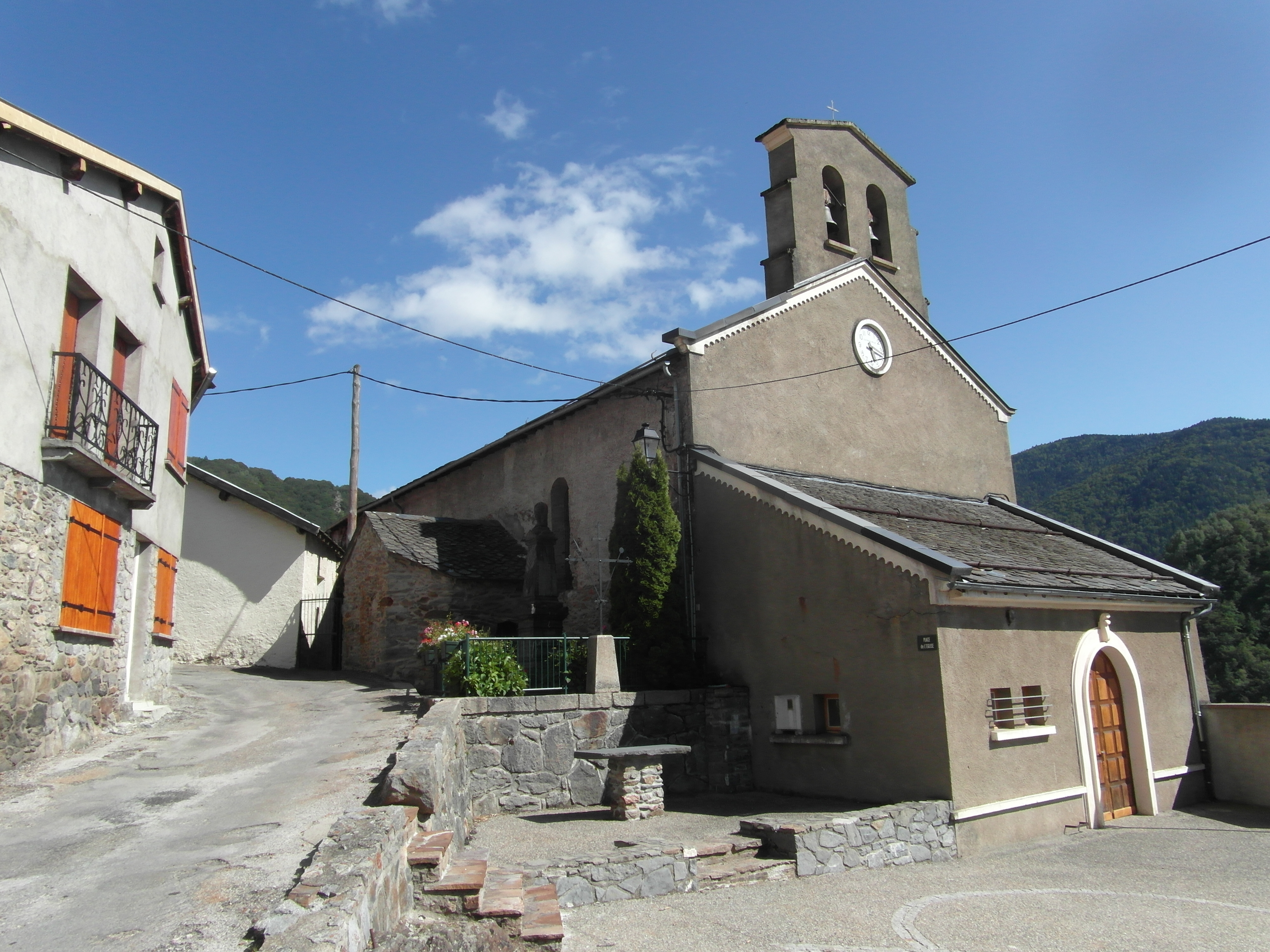
The Parish church in Ascou. Next to the church is a small memorial for those who fell in the First World War

The Parish Church contains a Statue of the Virgin and child which is registered as a historical object.

== Notable people linked to the commune ==
- Michel Naudy, journalist and politician.

== See also ==
- Communes of the Ariège department
