= Émilien Dumas =

- Born: 16 October 1804; Sommières, department of the Gard, France
- Died: 21 September 1870 (aged 65); Ax-les-Thermes, Ariège, France
- Education: Collège de France, École des Mines, Muséum national d'histoire naturelle
- Known for: Statistique, Géologique, Mineralogique, Métallurgique et Pleontologique du Departement du Gard
- Spouse: Pauline Borel
- Scientific career
- Fields: Palaeontologist and geologist
- Academic advisors: Georges Cuvier, Étienne Geoffroy Saint-Hilaire, Adrien-Henri de Jussieu

Jean Louis George Émilien Dumas (16 october 1804 – 21 September 1870) was a French scholar, palaeontologist, and geologist.

== Biography ==
Born to a Protestant family of the bourgeoisie in Gard, Émilien Dumas was immersed from his early childhood in an atmosphere of learning and erudition. His father, a former merchant involved in agriculture, was an educated man. The native flora of Gard provided him with his first field of study. From 1815 to 1824, he studied at Morges, Switzerland, then at Basel, where his passion for the natural sciences matured. He returned to his homeland in 1824 following the death of his mother.

Embarking on a career in the sciences, he went to Paris and studied at the Collège de France, the Ecole des Mines de Paris and the Muséum national d'histoire naturelle, and with Georges Cuvier, Étienne Geoffroy Saint-Hilaire, and Adrien-Henri de Jussieu.

His education in the natural sciences was well rounded, and he threw himself with equal passion into Zoology, Mineralogy, and Botany, as well as engaging in the contemporary debate over Lamarckism.

In 1828, he returned to Sommières, where he married Pauline Borel, a wealthy heiress from Orange, and daughter of a silk manufacturer. The same year, he unveiled a rich paleontological dig site at Pondres (Gard) whose human and animal remains fueled Lamarckist arguments, particularly in the field of Archaeozoology

He surveyed his region with great patience and tenacity over a period of 20 years, to produce a geological map of the département of Gard. During a long voyage in the 1860s he studied the geography of southern Europe. As an avid collector, he cultivated his curiosity throughout his life, and the Natural History Museum at Nîmes now preserves a large part of his numerous collections spanning the fields of Greek antiquities, botany, and geology.

The missing piece in this portrait of the "Explorer of Gard" is his taste for theater and acting. He was a willing participant as well as observer, which was considered by his contemporaries as incompatible with his role as a scientist.

He died on September 21, 1870, in Ax-sur-Ariège.

== Works ==
- Émilien Dumas, Statistique, Géologique, Mineralogique, Métallurgique et Pleontologique du Departement du Gard, 1876

== Bibliography ==
- Édouard Dumas, Émilien Dumas et l'empreinte de Sommières, Lacour-Ollé, 1993.
- « Émilien Dumas, l'explorateur du Gard », Catalogue de l'expostion organisée à l'occasion du bicentenaiee de sa naissance, Musée d'Histoire naturelle de Nîmes.
