= Caychax =

Commune in Ariège, France

- Part of Caychax-et-Senconac
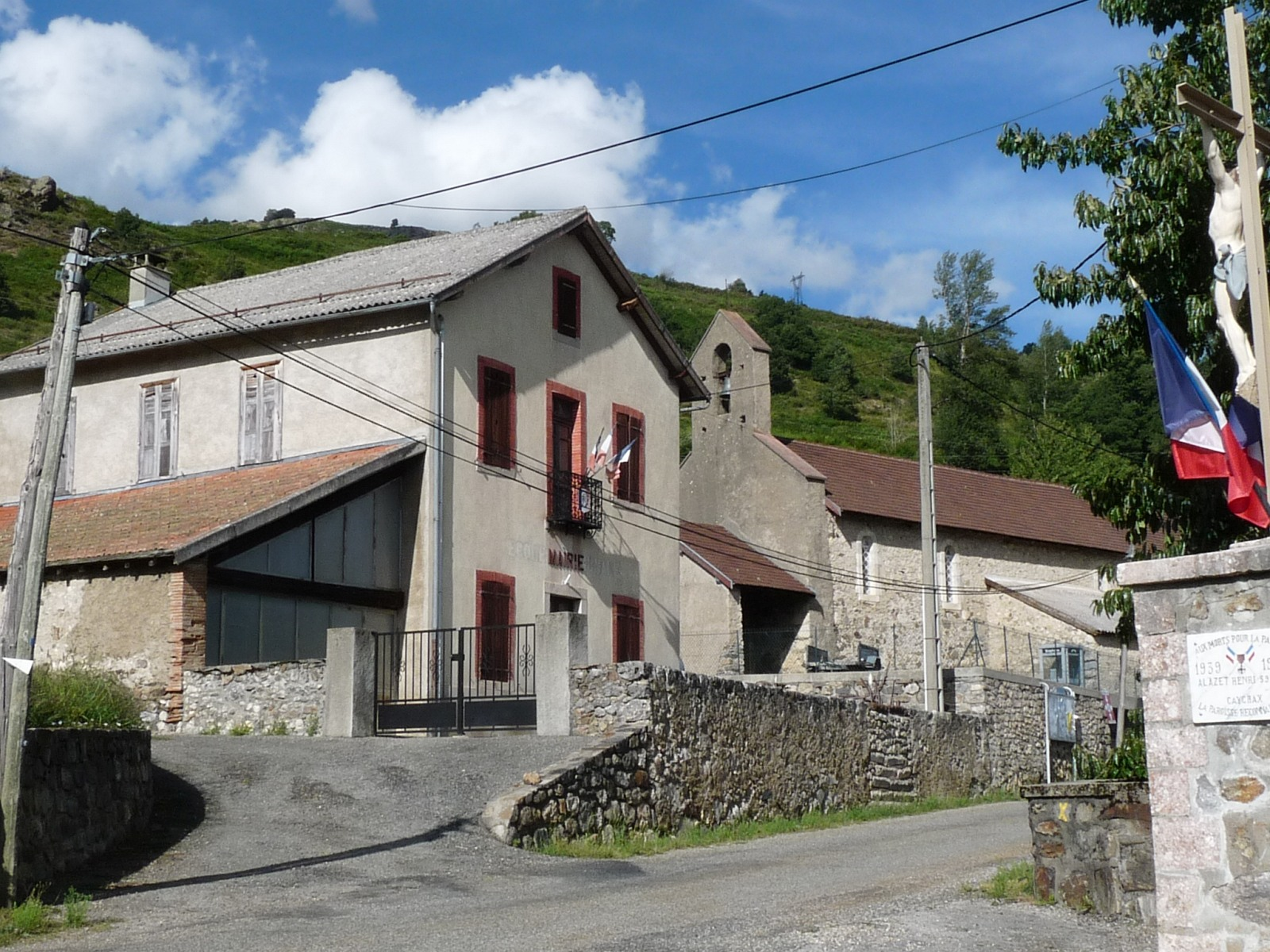
- Town hall
- Location of Caychax
- Location within France Location within Occitanie
- Coordinates: 42°47′37″N 1°43′11″E
- Country: France
- Region: Occitania
- Department: Ariège
- Arrondissement: Foix
- Canton: Haute-Ariège
- Commune: Caychax-et-Senconac
- Area^{1}: 5.66 km^{2} (2.19 sq mi)
- Elevation: 840 m (2,760 ft)
- Highest elevation: 2,113 m (6,932 ft)
- Lowest elevation: 718 m (2,356 ft)
- Population (2022): 14
  - Density: 2.5/km^{2} (6.4/sq mi)
- Time zone: UTC+01:00 (CET)
  - Summer (DST): UTC+02:00 (CEST)
- Postal code: 09250
- ^{1} French Land Register data, which excludes lakes, ponds, glaciers > 1 km^{2} (0.386 sq mi or 247 acres) and river estuaries.

Caychax is a former commune in the Ariège department in southwestern France. It was merged with Senconac to form Caychax-et-Senconac on 1 January 2025.

== Population ==
Historical population
Year	Pop.	±% p.a.
1968	35	—
1975	22	−6.42%
1982	28	+3.51%
1990	19	−4.73%
1999	18	−0.60%
2007	11	−5.97%
2012	13	+3.40%
2017	14	+1.49%
Source: INSEE

== See also ==
- Communes of the Ariège department
