= Senconac =

Commune in Ariège, France

- Part of Caychax-et-Senconac
- Location of Senconac
- Location within France Location within Occitanie
- Coordinates: 42°47′59″N 1°42′45″E
- Country: France
- Region: Occitania
- Department: Ariège
- Arrondissement: Foix
- Canton: Haute-Ariège
- Commune: Caychax-et-Senconac
- Area^{1}: 4.67 km^{2} (1.80 sq mi)
- Elevation: 900 m (3,000 ft)
- Highest elevation: 2,072 m (6,798 ft)
- Lowest elevation: 715 m (2,346 ft)
- Population (2022): 6
  - Density: 1.3/km^{2} (3.3/sq mi)
- Time zone: UTC+01:00 (CET)
  - Summer (DST): UTC+02:00 (CEST)
- Postal code: 09250
- ^{1} French Land Register data, which excludes lakes, ponds, glaciers > 1 km^{2} (0.386 sq mi or 247 acres) and river estuaries.

Senconac is a former commune in the Ariège department in southwestern France. It was merged with Caychax to form Caychax-et-Senconac on 1 January 2025.

== Population ==
Inhabitants of Senconac are called Senconacois in French.

Historical population
Year	Pop.	±% p.a.
1968	21	—
1975	15	−4.69%
1982	16	+0.93%
1990	10	−5.71%
1999	8	−2.45%
2007	5	−5.71%
2012	9	+12.47%
2017	12	+5.92%
Source: INSEE

== See also ==
- Communes of the Ariège department
