= Caychax-et-Senconac =

Commune in Occitanie, France

- Commune
- Location of Caychax-et-Senconac
- Location within France Location within Occitanie
- Coordinates: 42°47′37″N 1°43′11″E
- Country: France
- Region: Occitania
- Department: Ariège
- Arrondissement: Foix
- Canton: Haute-Ariège
- Intercommunality: Haute-Ariège

Government
  - Mayor (2025–2026): Jean-Pierre Doumeng
- Area^{1}: 10.33 km^{2} (3.99 sq mi)
- Highest elevation: 2,113 m (6,932 ft)
- Lowest elevation: 715 m (2,346 ft)
- Population (2023): 20
  - Density: 1.9/km^{2} (5.0/sq mi)
- Time zone: UTC+01:00 (CET)
  - Summer (DST): UTC+02:00 (CEST)
- INSEE/Postal code: 09088 /09250
- ^{1} French Land Register data, which excludes lakes, ponds, glaciers > 1 km^{2} (0.386 sq mi or 247 acres) and river estuaries.

Caychax-et-Senconac is a commune in the Ariège department in southwestern France. It was formed on 1 January 2025, with the merger of Caychax and Senconac.

== See also ==
- Communes of the Ariège department
