= La Libération de Paris =

La Libération de Paris l'insurrection Nationale inséparable de la Libération Nationale
- Titlescreen
- Directed by: André Zwobada
- Written by: Pierre Bost
- Starring: Philippe Leclerc de Hauteclocque; Charles de Gaulle; Georges Bidault; Alexandre Parodi; Marie-Pierre Koenig; Alphonse Juin; Brigitte Servan-Schreiber
- Narrated by: Pierre Blanchar
- Distributed by: Le Comité de Libération du Cinéma Français; France Libre Actualités
- Release date: September 1, 1944
- Running time: 31:27 minutes
- Country: France
- Language: French

La Libération de Paris (The Liberation of Paris) is a short historical documentary film shot in secret by small units of the French Resistance during the Battle for Paris in August 1944.

== Production ==
The full film of "La Libération de Paris"

In 1943, a group of French filmmakers, which included Louis Daquin, Jean Grémillon, Jacques Becker, and Pierre Renoir (Jean's brother), founded the Comité de libération du cinéma français. Technicians from this group filmed the uprising in Paris from its beginnings on August 19, 1944, and the footage was developed and edited for the film, which was released to French theaters on September 1, 1944, immediately after the German departure from the occupied territories.

== See also ==
- Liberation of Paris
  - Is Paris Burning? (1966) directed by French filmmaker René Clément, with a screenplay by Gore Vidal, Francis Ford Coppola, Jean Aurenche, Pierre Bost and Claude Brulé, adapted from the 1965 book of the same title by Larry Collins and Dominique Lapierre. The film stars an international ensemble cast that includes French (Jean-Paul Belmondo, Alain Delon, Bruno Cremer, Pierre Vaneck, Jean-Pierre Cassel, Leslie Caron, Charles Boyer, Yves Montand), American (Orson Welles, Kirk Douglas, Glenn Ford, Robert Stack, Anthony Perkins, George Chakiris) and German (Gert Fröbe, Hannes Messemer, Ernst Fritz Fürbringer, Harry Meyen, Wolfgang Preiss) stars.
  - Diplomacy (2014) offers an imagined account of the efforts by the Swedish diplomat Raoul Nordling to avert the destruction of the city by the German general Dietrich von Choltitz. Starring André Dussollier and Niels Arestrup, it won the César Award for Best Adaptation.

== Media links ==
- La Libération de Paris, Archive.org
