= Diplomatie (play) =

Diplomatie (English: Diplomacy) is a play by French writer Cyril Gély that tells the story of a fictional meeting that could have taken place in the early hours of August 25, 1944, between Swedish diplomat Raoul Nordling and German general Dietrich von Choltitz, at the Meurice Hotel in Paris. The play has had productions in France, Switzerland, and Australia. It was also adapted into a film of the same name, which premiered at the 64th Berlin International Film Festival in 2014. Gély co-wrote the screenplay with director Volker Schlöndorff.

== Plot ==
Fresh off a decisive defeat at the Battle of Normandy, the Nazis are facing imminent defeat. Dietrich von Choltitz, the German general and governor of occupied Paris, is ordered by Adolf Hitler to destroy the city before it can be liberated. The situation is rooted in historical reality, as Hitler told von Cholitz by telegram, "Paris must not fall into the hands of the enemy except as a field of ruins."

Before dawn on August 25, 1944, Swedish diplomat Raoul Nordling arranges a meeting in von Cholitz's suite at the Meurice Hotel in Paris to dissuade him from following Hitler's order. The play follows the imagined cat-and-mouse conversation between the two men, using a single set and consisting almost entirely of dialogue.

== Production history ==
=== France ===
The play premiered on January 18, 2011, at the Théâtre de la Madeleine, starring Niels Arestrup as Dietrich von Cholitz and André Dussollier as Raoul Nordling. The production received praise from critics and audiences in Paris. It also toured to Nice, Lyon, and Geneva.

=== Australia ===
The play was translated into English by Julie Rose and shown at the Ensemble Theatre, starring John Bell and John Gaden. It had a sellout season in 2018, and returned the following year with the same actors.

== Film adaptation ==
The play was adapted into a film that premiered at the 64th Berlin International Film Festival in 2014. Gély co-wrote the screenplay with director Volker Schlöndorff. Arestrup and Dussollier reprised their roles from the original French stage production.
