= Liberation of Paris =

Military battle during World War II on 19 August 1944

- Part of Operation Overlord of World War II
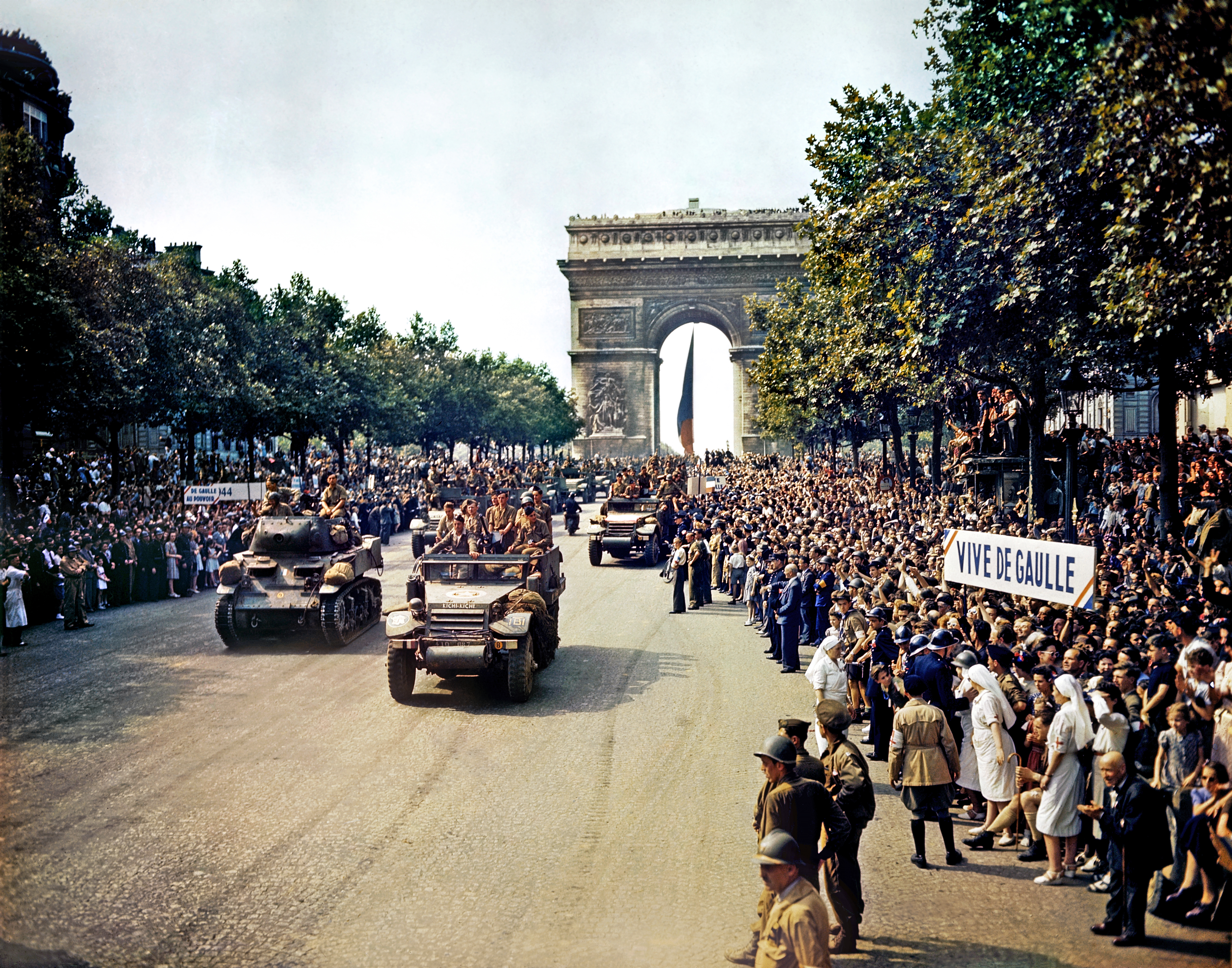
- Parisians line the Champs Élysées for a parade conducted by the French 2nd Armored Division led by General Leclerc on 26 August 1944. Among the crowd can be seen banners in support of Charles de Gaulle.
| Date | 19–25 August 1944 (6 days) |
| Location | Paris and outskirts, France 48.8735°N 2.29642°E |
| Result | Free French and allied victory |
| Territorial changes | Paris annexed into the Provisional Government of the French Republic |

Belligerents
| France • Free France; United States; United Kingdom | Germany; Vichy France |

Commanders and leaders
| (Provisional Government of the French Republic) Charles de Gaulle; (Provisional Government of the French Republic) Philippe Leclerc; (Provisional Government of the French Republic) Jacques Chaban-Delmas; Henri Rol-Tanguy; (United States) Raymond O. Barton; (United Kingdom) Bernard Montgomery | (Nazi Germany) Dietrich von Choltitz (surrendered); Joseph Darnand |

Units involved
| (Free France) FFI (Provisional Government of the French Republic) 2nd Armored Division • Spanish Exiles (United States) 4th Infantry Division | (Nazi Germany) 325th Security Division (surrendered); Milice |

Casualties and losses
| French Resistance: 1,600 dead; French liberation army: 130 dead; 319 wounded; United States: Unknown; United Kingdom: Unknown | 3,200 dead; 12,800 prisoners |

The Liberation of Paris (French: Libération de Paris) was a battle that took place during World War II from 19 August 1944 until the German garrison surrendered the French capital on 25 August 1944. Paris had been occupied by Nazi Germany since the signing of the Armistice of 22 June 1940, after which the Wehrmacht occupied northern and western France.

Given Paris's role as capital, military expediency was weighed against symbolic and political objectives at both the planning and operational levels. SHAEF sought to bypass the city to conserve resources and hasten a strategic thrust toward the Rhine. General Charles de Gaulle argued that French sovereignty should be restored quickly to avoid the kind of occupation government imposed on Allied-occupied Italy. British and American commanders stipulated that any French division leading the advance consist of white personnel; the Allies selected General Philippe Leclerc's 2nd Armoured Division as the only formation that could be reorganised to meet the condition. Delayed by combat and poor roads, Leclerc ultimately disobeyed his orders and rushed a vanguard ahead to secure the capital after the Resistance revolted against the occupation.

Following weeks of labour stoppages that had paralysed occupying authorities, the battle began on 19 August, with the French Forces of the Interior—the military structure of the French Resistance—staging an uprising against the German garrison. Swedish Consul General Raoul Nordling brokered a truce between the Resistance and German military governor Dietrich von Choltitz that briefly slowed the fighting but was never fully observed, and street skirmishes and barricade-building continued through 22 August. From 17 August or earlier, German engineers mined the Seine bridges and several government buildings under preliminary orders that the city "must not fall into the enemy's hand except lying in complete debris." Some prominent landmarks, including the Eiffel Tower, remained unwired for demolition when Hitler finally ordered maximum destruction on 23 August.

Choltitz surrendered the German garrison on 25 August, and de Gaulle arrived the same day to assume control of the city as head of the Provisional Government of the French Republic, delivering a speech at the Hôtel de Ville that credited the liberation to the French people themselves. Despite concerns from Allied commanders that Paris remained insecure, de Gaulle led a victory parade the following day, during which gunfire from German and Vichy militia holdouts forced crowds to scatter near the Place de la Concorde. The liberation legitimised the Provisional Government's authority over mainland France, though armed conflict continued in parts of eastern France into early 1945. In Paris, the collapse of Vichy authority triggered a wave of extrajudicial killings of suspected collaborators before the Provisional Government established formal courts that autumn to conduct a legal purge.

== Background ==
=== Strategic planning (Early 1944 – July 1944) ===
Following the Normandy landings in June 1944, the strategic framework adopted by Supreme Headquarters Allied Expeditionary Force (SHAEF) under General Dwight D. Eisenhower did not include an immediate assault on Paris. SHAEF planners viewed the German industrial heartland along the Rhine and the Ruhr as the decisive targets needed to end the war in Europe. Eisenhower sought to bypass Paris to the north and south to encircle retreating German armies, avoid costly street fighting, and spare the historic capital from artillery and aerial bombardment. Logistics also played a central role in SHAEF's reluctance: liberating Paris would immediately burden Allied supply lines with feeding more than two million civilians, requiring an estimated 4,000 short tons (3,600 t) of food and fuel per day, which would divert essential supplies away from frontline combat units advancing toward Germany.

While Allied High Command deferred the timing of the liberation, they had agreed in principle in early 1944 that a French formation should lead any eventual entry into the capital. However, British and American commanders stipulated that this unit consist of white personnel. Because nearly two-thirds of the Free French Army comprised African colonial troops (predominantly Senegalese Tirailleurs), Allied planners selected General Philippe Leclerc's 2nd Armoured Division, the only French formation that could be reorganised as predominantly white: its Black African soldiers were transferred out and replaced with white recruits from other units, supplemented by lighter-skinned soldiers drawn from North Africa and Syria.

In late July 1944, the Allied breakout in Operation Cobra and the closure of the Falaise pocket radically shifted the campaign's tempo. As German lines collapsed, General Charles de Gaulle, head of the Provisional Government of the French Republic (GPRF), insisted that liberating Paris was an urgent necessity to establish French sovereignty—aiming to preempt both Allied military rule (AMGOT) and an uncontrolled uprising led by the communist FTP under Colonel Henri Rol-Tanguy. De Gaulle pressed Eisenhower to enter the capital, warning he would order General Philippe Leclerc's 2nd Armoured Division to march on Paris independently if SHAEF delayed.

== Prelude ==
=== The situation in Paris and the railway strike (early August 1944) ===
Inside Paris, four years of occupation had brought severe food rationing, coal shortages, and mounting Gestapo repression. By early August, the distant rumble of Allied artillery became audible and German administrative personnel began evacuating eastward.

The first overt action came from the railway workers (cheminots) of the SNCF. The cheminots had a well-developed clandestine network and had engaged in covert sabotage since D-Day under Plan Vert. Facing demands to prioritize evacuation and deportation trains to Germany, the railway unions initiated a strike on 10 August and occupied rail depots across Paris. The stoppage quickly spread to 25 stations, halting regional train traffic.

The rail stoppage remained in effect throughout the battle, severely impairing German military logistics. Between 11 and 14 August, German attempts to force train crews back to work at gunpoint failed. Because municipal power plants and coal gas works relied entirely on rail shipments, the strike shut down the city's gas and electricity supplies. As German occupation staff began fleeing the capital in long road convoys, clandestine police resistance networks coordinated to launch their own walkout.

=== Preceding events (15–17 August 1944) ===
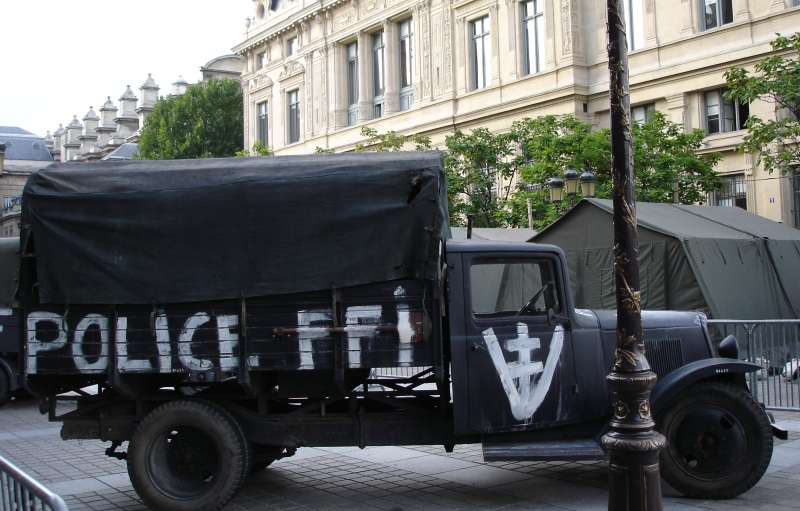
A truck painted with the insignia of the FFI and the V for Victory

The success of the railway strike catalyzed other groups to act openly as German control weakened:

- 15 August: Employees of the Paris Métro, the Gendarmerie, and the National Police went on strike, depriving the German garrison of local enforcement assistance. The same day, in the northeastern suburb of Pantin, occupation authorities assembled what would be the last major deportation convoy from the Paris region, transporting 1,654 men (including 168 captured Allied airmen) and 546 women to Buchenwald and Ravensbrück.
- 16 August: Postal and telegraph (PTT) workers joined the strike wave, severing official communications. That afternoon, 35 young FFI members were lured into an ambush by a Gestapo informant at the Grande Cascade in the Bois de Boulogne and summarily executed.
- 17 August: German authorities forcibly evacuated Vichy Prime Minister Pierre Laval from Paris to Belfort, leaving the capital without a functioning civil government and accelerating the flight of remaining Vichy administrators and German embassy personnel. Amid fears that the retreating Germans intended to demolish bridges and municipal utilities, Pierre Taittinger, president of the Paris Municipal Council, and Swedish Consul General Raoul Nordling met with General Dietrich von Choltitz, the military governor of Paris, urging him to prevent the city's destruction. By that evening, with public services completely halted and German administrative personnel in full flight, the Resistance leadership resolved to move from labor strikes to open insurrection.

Even as these acts of civil and administrative resistance unfolded largely without violence, German military engineers had for several days already been preparing the city for destruction. Since shortly after Choltitz's arrival as military governor in early August, the 813th Engineer Company had been mining the bridges spanning the Seine and wiring government buildings with demolition charges. On 17 August — the same day Taittinger and Nordling appealed to him directly — Choltitz received a telegram from Field Marshal Günther von Kluge instructing: "I give the order for the neutralization and destruction envisaged for Paris."

== Battle and liberation ==
=== FFI uprising (18–23 August) ===
==== Initial armed conflict (18–19 August) ====
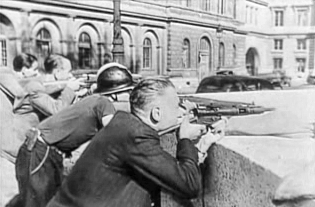
FFI uprising on 19 August. One skirmisher is wearing an Adrian helmet.

On 18 August, the Parisian Committee of Liberation (CPL) and FFI regional commander Colonel Henri Rol-Tanguy posted tracts across the capital declaring a general strike and calling for mass mobilization, transforming earlier sectoral walkouts into an insurrection. The posters declared that "the war continues" and summoned all able-bodied men aged 18 to 50, alongside the police, the Gendarmerie, and the Republican Guard, to join the armed struggle against the invader while promising retribution for collaborators. Published in agreement with De Gaulle's Provisional Government of the French Republic, the proclamations were signed by the CPL under the authority of "Regional Chief Colonel Rol".

On the morning of 19 August, the insurrection turned into open armed conflict as retreating German vehicular columns continued streaming east down the Champs-Élysées. Clandestine police officers in civilian clothes stormed and occupied the Préfecture de Police on the Île de la Cité, raising the French Tricolour above the building, while FFI units across the city attacked German garrisons, administrative headquarters, and supply depots. The Resistance also began seizing other buildings across the city, including the Louvre, and small mobile units of the Red Cross moved into the city to assist French and German wounded. The same day, the Germans detonated a barge filled with mines in the northeastern suburb of Pantin, setting fire to mills that supplied Paris with flour.

==== Nordling truce, barricade-building, street skirmishes (19–22 August) ====
Choltitz commanded roughly 16,000 German troops and 80 tanks in the city, sufficient to overwhelm the lightly armed insurgents by force. Instead, Swedish Consul General Raoul Nordling persuaded him to accept a ceasefire around the besieged Préfecture de Police on 19 August and to extend it into a broader truce the following day. The truce gave the Resistance time to organise, but it was not fully observed on either side, and fighting continued at reduced intensity through 21 and 22 August.

On 20 August, as the truce came into effect, a German patrol arrested Alexandre Parodi — de Gaulle's clandestine delegate-general and the senior civil authority of the incoming provisional government — along with his deputies Roland Pré and Émile Laffon. Nordling intervened directly with Choltitz, and the three men were released.

By 22 August, Resistance fighters had extended their control over whole districts of the city, confining German forces to isolated strongpoints. More than 600 barricades went up within 36 hours, built from overturned vehicles, manhole covers, and paving stones; Resistance leader Maurice Kriegel-Valrimont later recalled that "some of the barricades were real masterpieces, built by craftsmen and strong enough to stop a tank. Others would have just collapsed, but the Germans didn't know which was which."

==== Choltitz and Hitler's final orders (23 August) ====
At 9:00 a.m. on 23 August, under Choltitz's orders, the Germans opened fire on the Grand Palais, an FFI stronghold, and German tanks fired at the barricades in the streets. That same day, Hitler gave the order to inflict maximum damage on the city.

That morning, as fighting continued around the Grand Palais and the barricades, SS engineers inspected the structural supports of the Eiffel Tower to determine where demolition charges could be placed most effectively. The tower had not yet been wired for destruction, unlike the Seine bridges and several government buildings already mined in the preceding days.

=== Allies enter Paris (24–25 August) ===
Film "La Libération de Paris" shot by the French Resistance

On 24 August, after combat and poor roads had delayed his 2nd Armored Division, Free French general Leclerc disobeyed his direct superior, American V Corps commander Major General Leonard T. Gerow, and sent a vanguard to Paris with the message that the entire division would be there the following day. The 2nd Armored Division was equipped with American M4 Sherman tanks, halftracks and trucks, and the vanguard that Leclerc chose was the 9th Company of the Régiment de marche du Tchad, nicknamed La Nueve (Spanish for "the nine") because of its 160 men under French command, 146 of them were Spanish Republicans. 9th Company commander Captain Raymond Dronne became the second uniformed Allied officer to enter Paris after Amado Granell and the first French officer to reenter the capital.

The 9th Company broke into the centre of Paris by the Porte d'Italie and reached the Hôtel de Ville at 9:22 pm. Upon entering the town hall square, the half-track "Ebro" fired the first rounds at a large group of German fusiliers and machine guns. Civilians went out to the street and sang "La Marseillaise" as news of the 2nd Armoured Division's arrival was broadcast across the capital.

Earlier on 22 August, Resistance fighters had seized the Paris studios of Radiodiffusion nationale (RN), which had operated under Vichy propaganda minister Philippe Henriot until 1944. The Provisional Government had established its own rival RN service from Algiers on 4 April 1944; with the Paris station secured, Pierre Schaeffer broadcast the arrival of Leclerc's vanguard and asked any priests listening to ring their church bells. The churches that participated included Notre-Dame de Paris and Sacré-Cœur in Montmartre – whose bells include the Savoyarde, a bourdon that is France's biggest bell. Captain Dronne later went to von Choltitz's command post to request the German surrender.

The 4th US Infantry Division commanded by Raymond Barton also entered through the Porte d'Italie in the early hours of 25 August. The leading American regiments covered the right flank of the French 2nd Armoured, turned east at the Place de la Bastille, and made their way along Avenue Daumesnil, heading towards the Bois de Vincennes. In the afternoon the British 30 Assault Unit had entered the Porte d'Orléans and then searched buildings for vital intelligence, later capturing the former Headquarters of Admiral Karl Dönitz, the Château de la Muette.

While awaiting the final capitulation, the 9th Company assaulted the Chamber of Deputies, the Hôtel Majestic and the Place de la Concorde.

With the battle nearing its end, resistance groups brought Allied airmen and other troops hidden in suburban towns, such as Montlhéry, into central Paris.

=== German surrender (25 August) ===
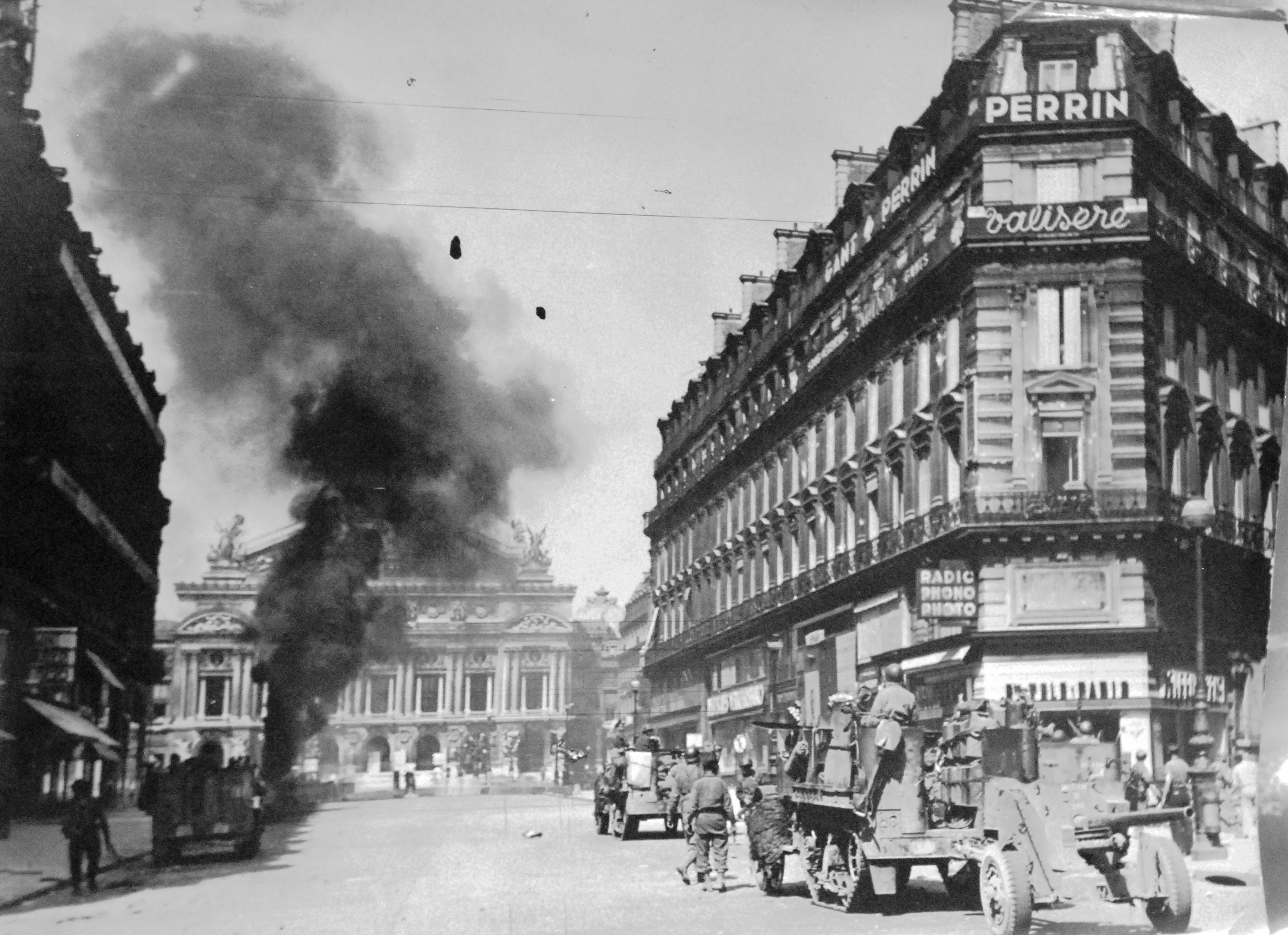
25 August – Armoured vehicles of the 2nd Armored (Leclerc) Division fighting before the Palais Garnier. One German tank is going up in flames.

Despite repeated orders from Hitler that the French capital "must not fall into the enemy's hand except lying in complete debris", which was to be accomplished by bombing it and blowing up its bridges, Choltitz, as commander of the German garrison and military governor of Paris, surrendered at 3:30 p.m. at the Hôtel Meurice. He was then driven to the Caserne de la Cité, seat of the Paris Police Prefecture, where he signed the official surrender, and then to the Gare Montparnasse, where General Leclerc had established his command post, to sign the surrender of the German troops in Paris.

=== De Gaulle's speech (25 August) ===
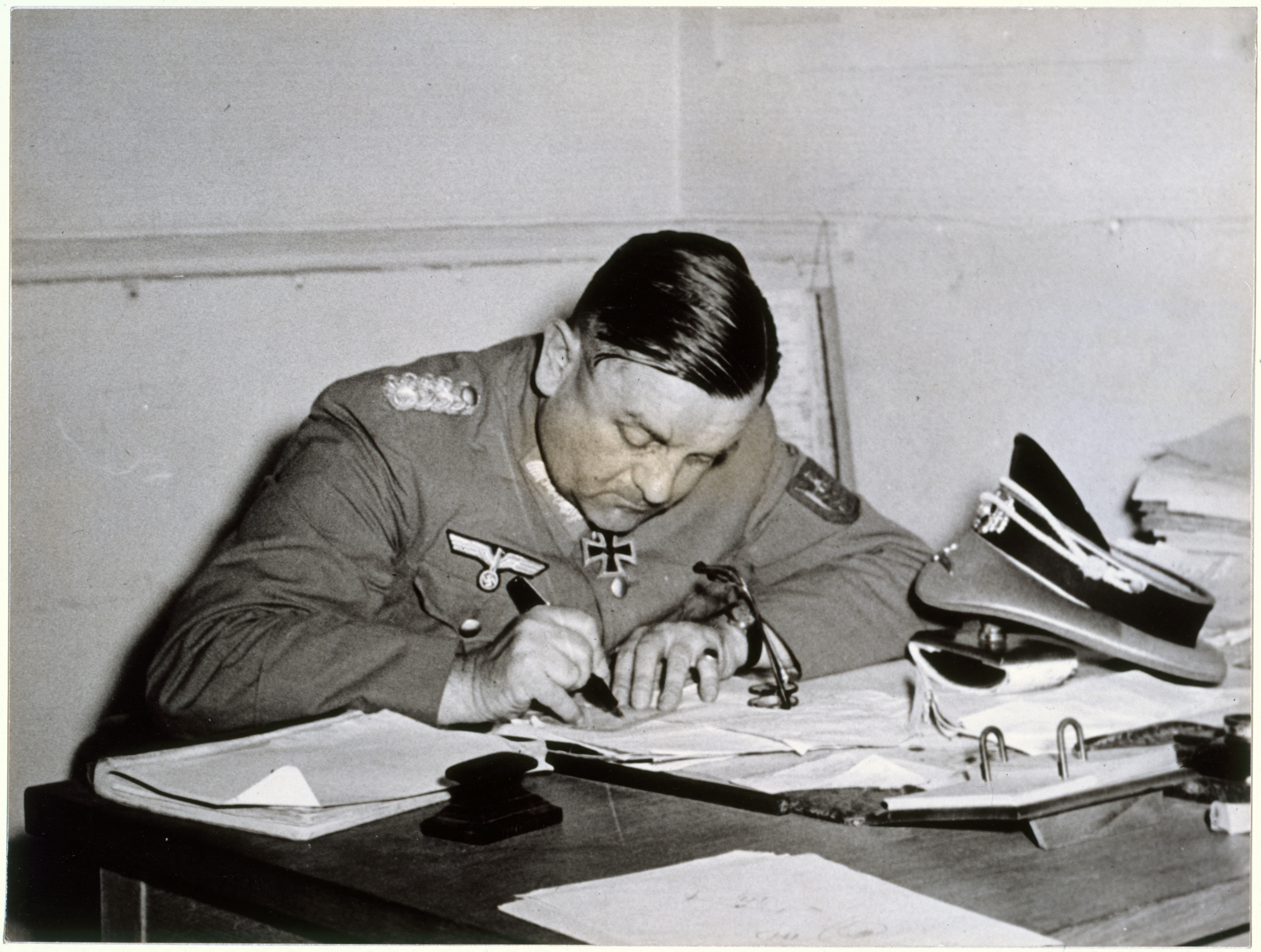
General Von Choltitz signed his troops' surrender at Gare Montparnasse

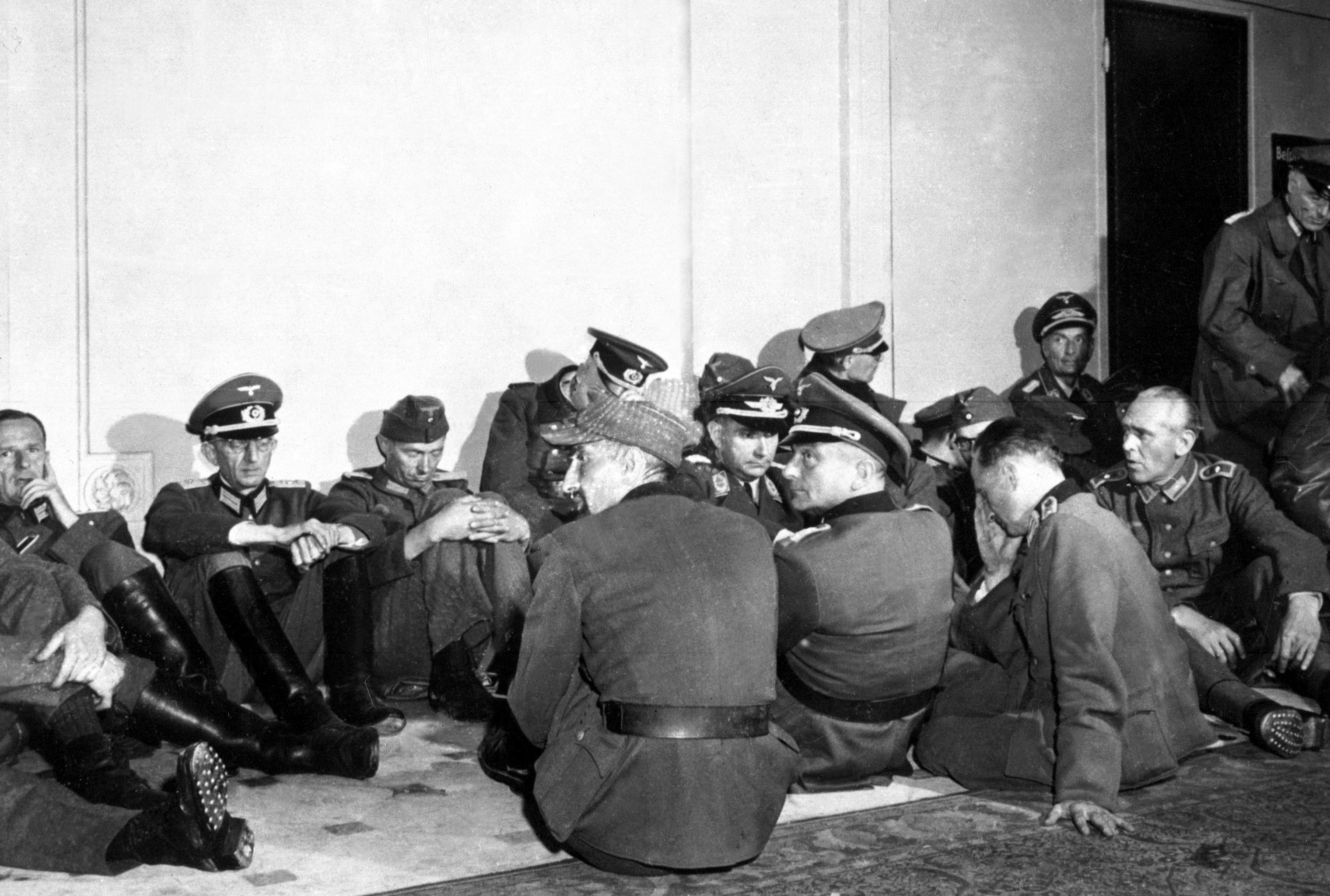
German soldiers at the Hôtel Majestic, headquarters for the Militärbefehlshaber in Frankreich, the German High Military Command in France. They requested to be made prisoners only by the military, and surrendered to Battalion Chief Jacques Massu of the 2e DB.

The same day that the Germans surrendered, de Gaulle, President of the Provisional Government of the French Republic, moved back into the War Ministry on the Rue Saint-Dominique and then made a speech at the Hôtel de Ville that was also broadcast. His speech proclaimed that Paris had liberated itself with help from French forces, notably downplaying the part that Barton's 4th Infantry played in the battle, and also dismissed Vichy as a false France.

Why do you wish us to hide the emotion which seizes us all, men and women, who are here, at home, in Paris that stood up to liberate itself and that succeeded in doing this with its own hands?

No! We will not hide this deep and sacred emotion. These are minutes which go beyond each of our poor lives. Paris! Paris outraged! Paris broken! Paris martyred! But Paris liberated! Liberated by itself, liberated by its people with the help of the French armies, with the support and the help of all France, of the France that fights, of the only France, of the real France, of the eternal France!

Since the enemy which held Paris has capitulated into our hands, France returns to Paris, to her home. She returns bloody, but quite resolute. She returns there enlightened by the immense lesson, but more certain than ever of her duties and of her rights.

I speak of her duties first, and I will sum them all up by saying that for now, it is a matter of the duties of war. The enemy is staggering, but he is not beaten yet. He remains on our soil.

It will not even be enough that we have, with the help of our dear and admirable Allies, chased him from our home for us to consider ourselves satisfied after what has happened. We want to enter his territory as is fitting, as victors.

This is why the French vanguard has entered Paris with guns blazing. This is why the great French army from Italy has landed in the south and is advancing rapidly up the Rhône valley. This is why our brave and dear Forces of the interior will arm themselves with modern weapons. It is for this revenge, this vengeance and justice, that we will keep fighting until the final day, until the day of total and complete victory.

This duty of war, all the men who are here and all those who hear us in France know that it demands national unity. We, who have lived the greatest hours of our History, we have nothing else to wish than to show ourselves, up to the end, worthy of France. Long live France!

=== Victory parades (26 and 29 August) ===
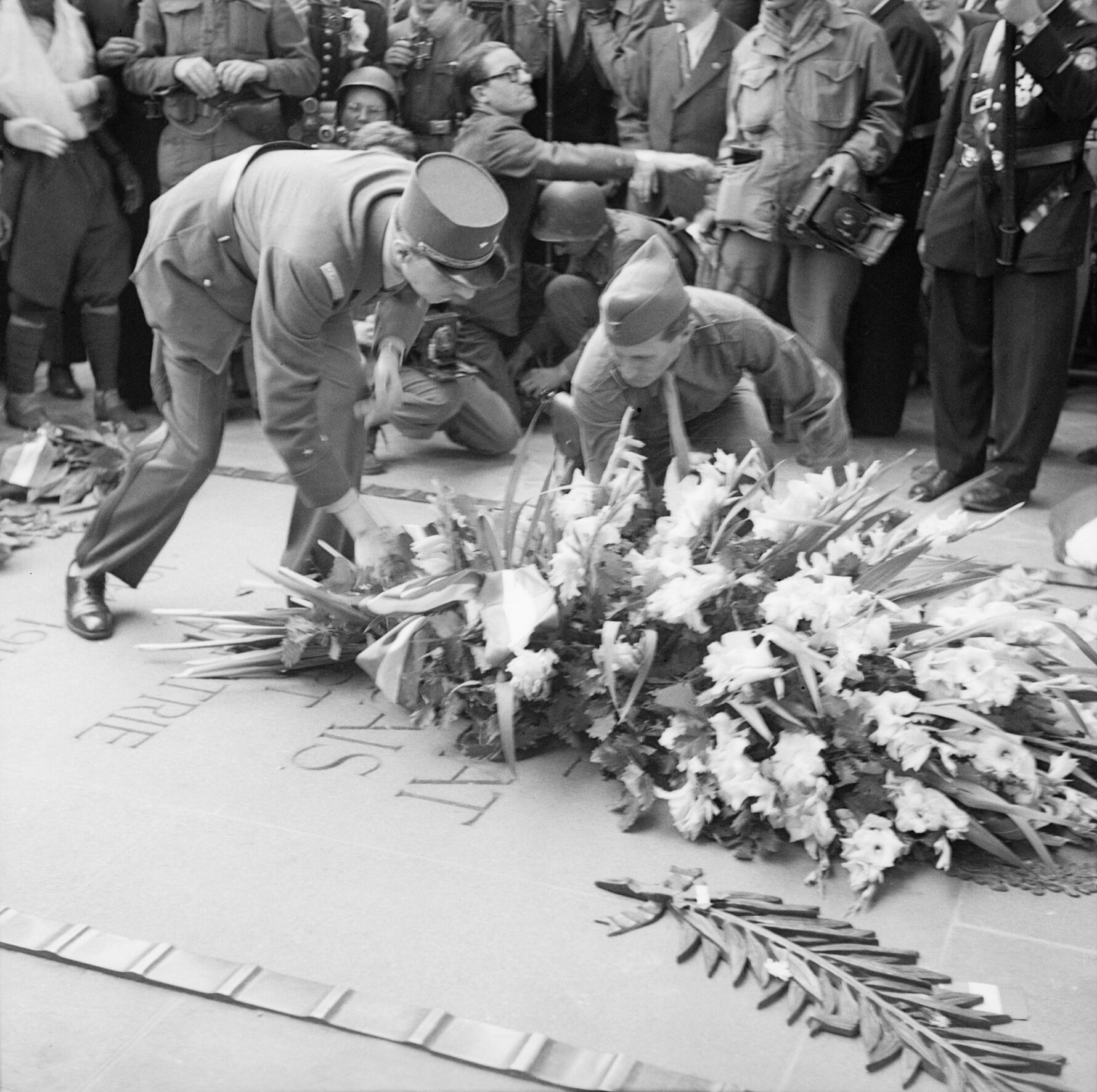
De Gaulle lays a wreath at the Tomb of the Unknown Soldier under the Arc de Triomphe, 26 August 1944.

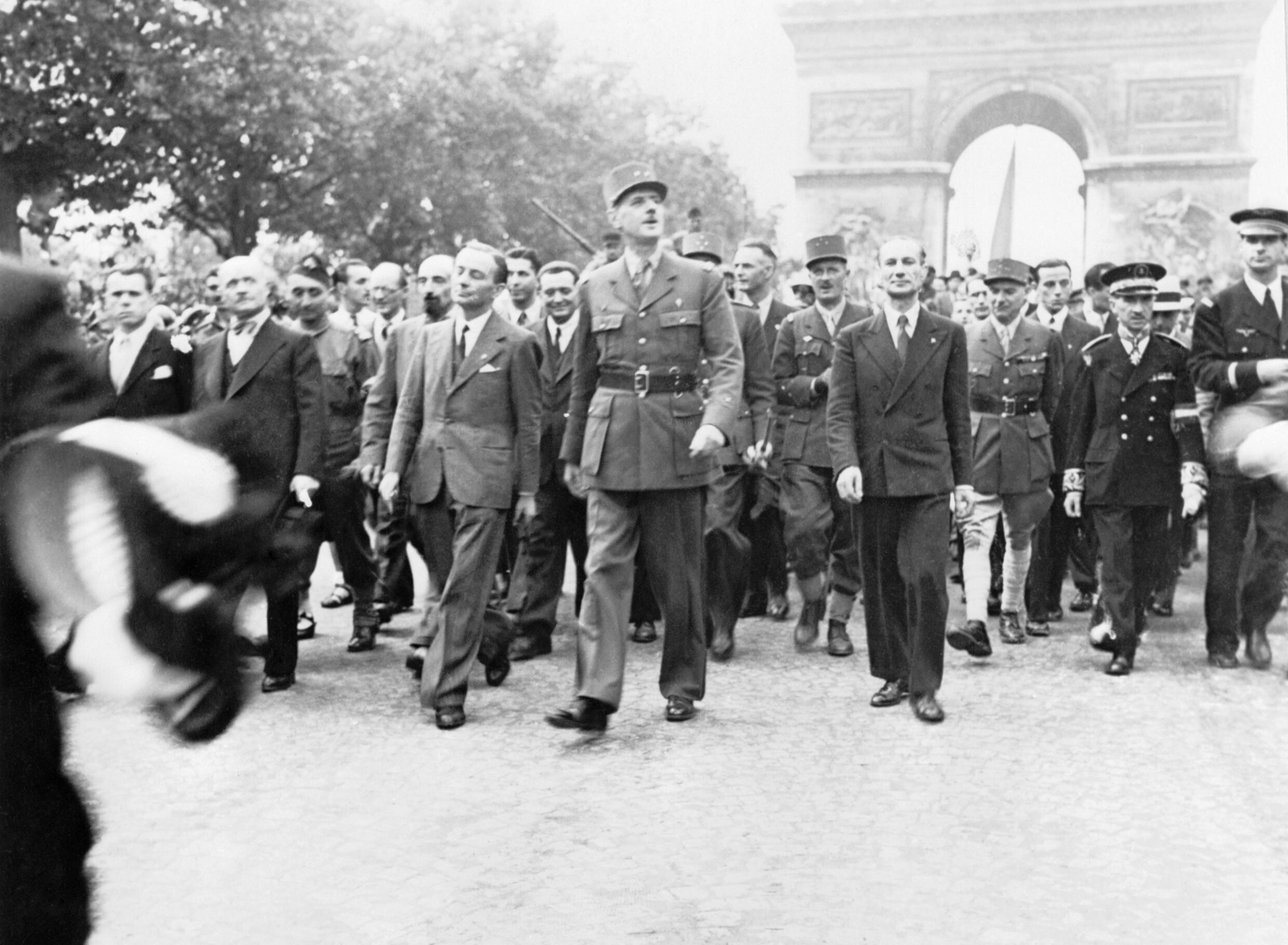
General de Gaulle and his entourage stroll down the Champs-Élysées to Notre-Dame Cathedral for a Te Deum ceremony, 26 August 1944.

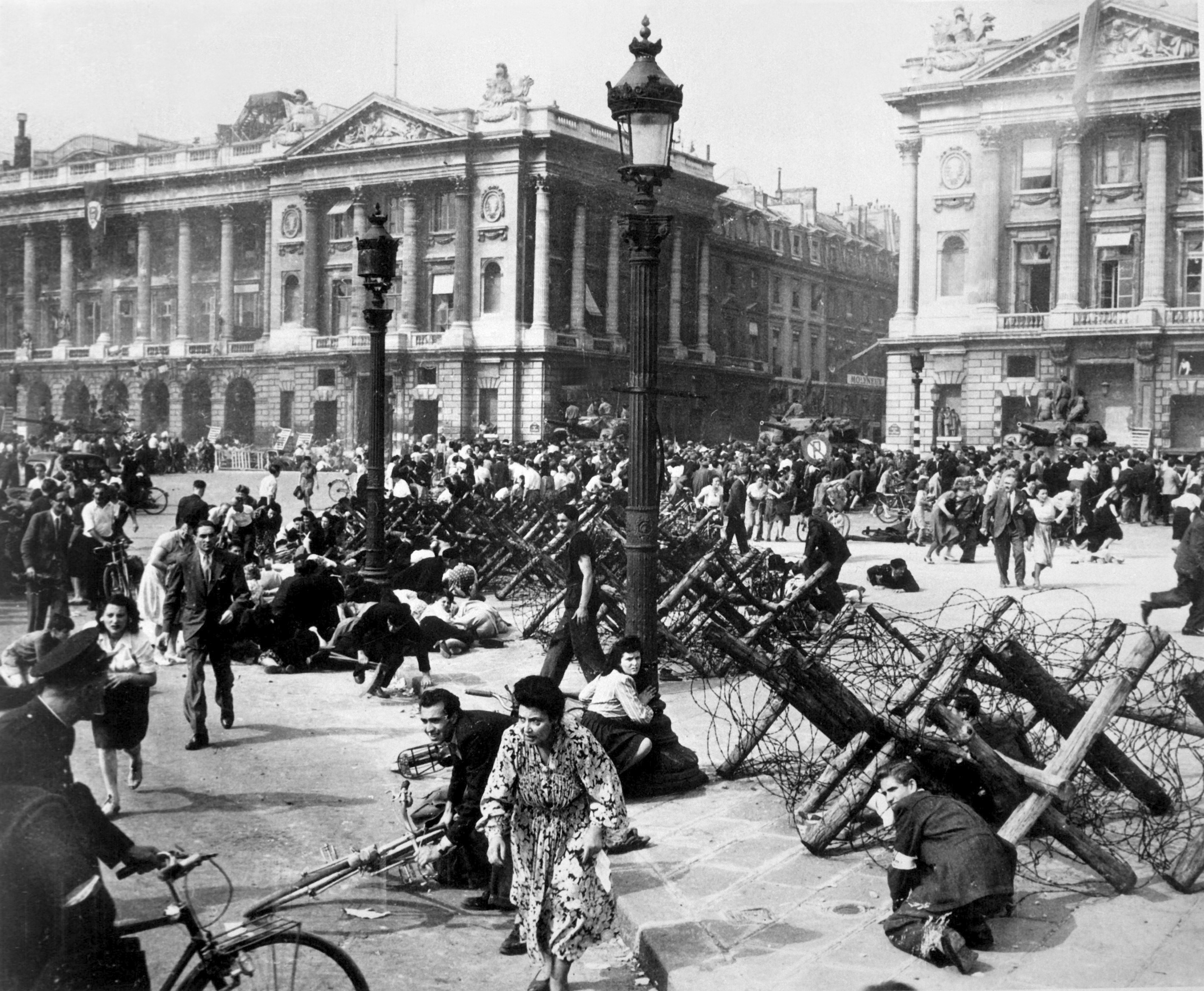
As Allied troops enter Paris on 26 August, celebrating crowds on the Place de la Concorde take cover from remaining snipers.

==== 26 August ====
On 26 August, de Gaulle organized a massive triumphal procession down the Champs-Élysées to assert the authority of the Provisional Government of the French Republic and cement his position as national leader. Despite concerns from Allied commanders that Paris remained insecure, de Gaulle insisted that Leclerc's 2nd Armoured Division remain in Paris to line the route.

The procession began at the Arc de Triomphe, where de Gaulle rekindled the Eternal Flame at France's Tomb of the Unknown Soldier. To project singular state leadership, de Gaulle ensured he led the procession alone, with Resistance leaders, Paris Liberation Committee members, and military commanders following several paces behind. An estimated two million people lined the boulevards to witness the march—a crowd not matched on the Champs-Élysées until the celebrations following the 1998 World Cup. As the march reached the Place de la Concorde, scattered gunfire erupted from remaining German snipers and Vichy militiamen positioned on surrounding rooftops, including the Hôtel de Crillon. Panicked crowds scattered for cover, but de Gaulle proceeded into Notre-Dame de Paris for a Te Deum service, remaining upright and refusing to take cover when shots were fired inside and outside the cathedral.

==== 29 August ====
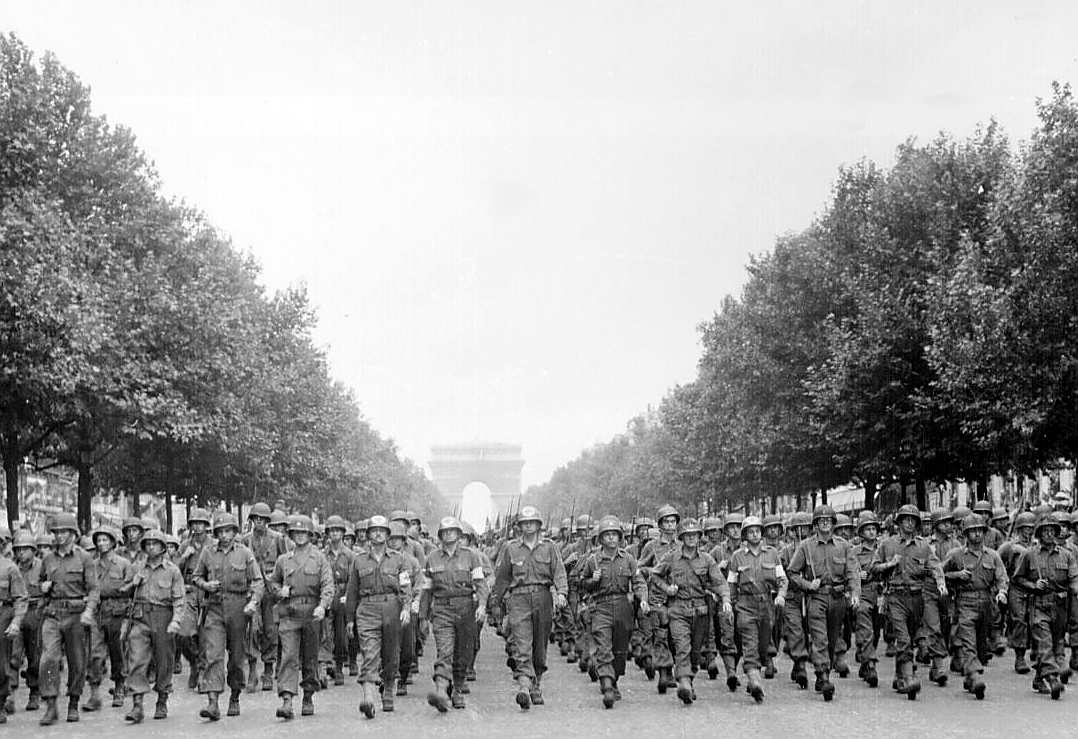
The US 28th Infantry Division on the Champs-Élysées during the parade on 29 August 1944.

U.S. Army soldiers in front of the Palais de Chaillot in the Jardins du Trocadéro.

On 29 August, the US Army's 28th Infantry Division, which had assembled in the Bois de Boulogne the previous night, paraded 24-abreast up the Avenue Hoche to the Arc de Triomphe, then down the Champs-Élysées. Joyous crowds greeted the Americans as the entire division, men and vehicles, marched through Paris "on its way to assigned attack positions northeast of the French capital."

=== Food crisis ===
The liberation was ongoing, but it became apparent that food in Paris was getting scarcer by the day. The French rail network had largely been destroyed by Allied bombing and so getting food in had become a problem, especially since the Germans had stripped Paris of its resources for themselves. The Allies realised the necessity to get Paris back on its feet and pushed a plan for food convoys to get through to the capital as soon as possible. In addition, surrounding towns and villages were requested to supply as much to Paris as possible. The Civil Affairs of SHAEF authorised the import of up to 2,400 tons of food per day at the expense of the military effort. A British food convoy labelled 'Vivres Pour Paris' entered on 29 August, US supplies were flown in via Orléans Airport before they were sent in. Also, 500 tons were delivered a day by the British and another 500 tons by the Americans. Along with French civilians outside Paris bringing in indigenous resources, the food crisis had been overcome within ten days.

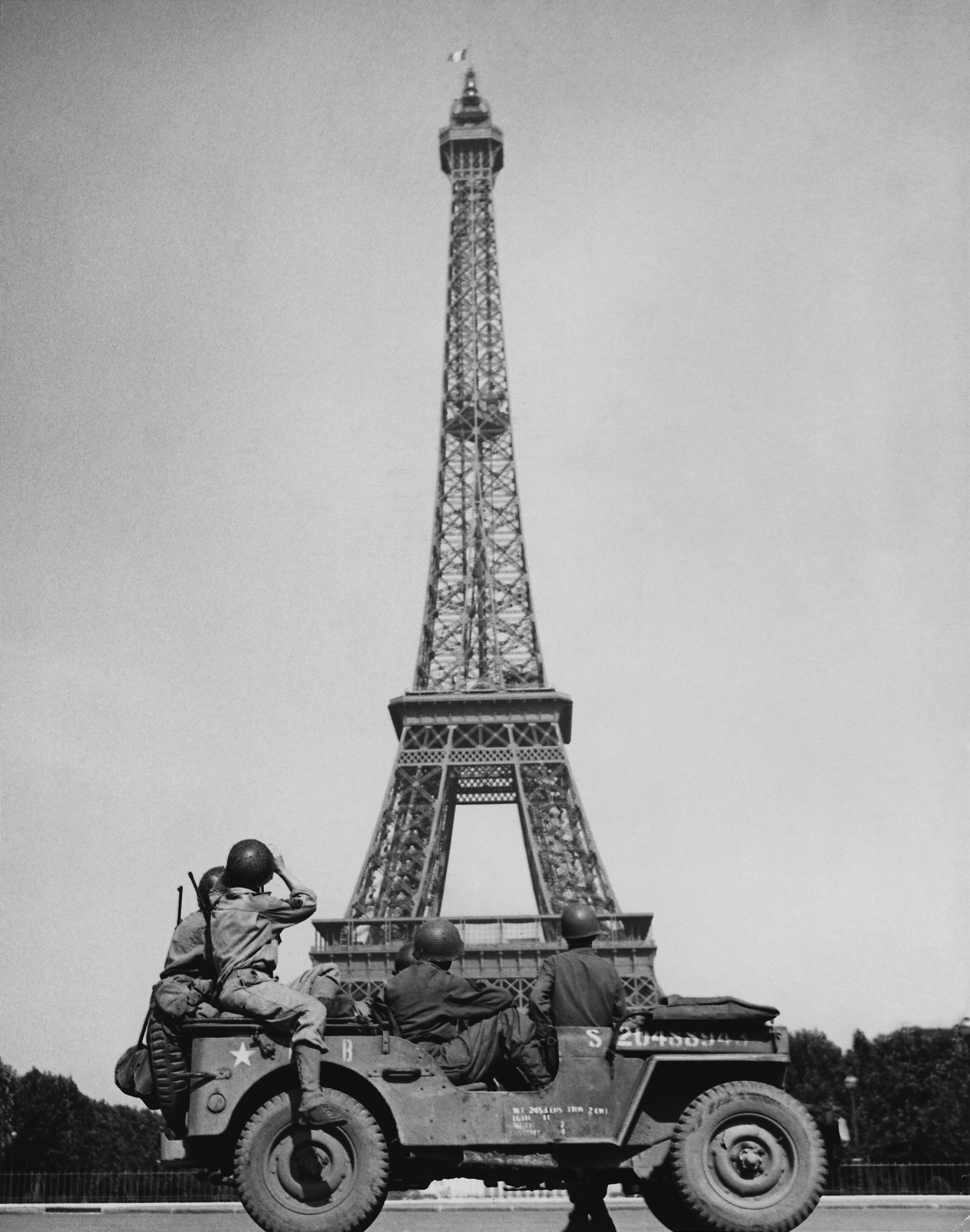
American soldiers look at the French tricolour flying from the Eiffel Tower.

== Aftermath ==
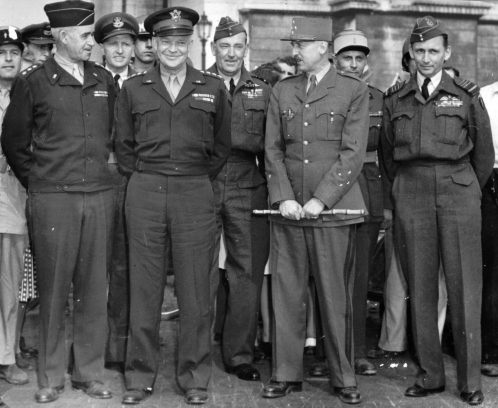
General Omar Bradley, Dwight D. Eisenhower, General Marie-Pierre Kœnig and Air Marshal Arthur Tedder in Paris, 1944

An estimated 800 to 1,000 Resistance fighters were killed during the Battle for Paris, and another 1,500 were wounded.

The 2nd Armored Division suffered 71 killed and 225 wounded. Material losses included 35 tanks, 6 self-propelled guns, and 111 vehicles, "a rather high ratio of losses for an armored division", according to historian Jacques Mordal.

Choltitz was held for the remainder of the war at Trent Park near London along with other senior German officers. In his memoir Brennt Paris? ("Is Paris Burning?"), first published in 1950, Choltitz (1894–1966) described himself as the saviour of Paris. In fact it was more the case that he had lost control of the city and had no means to carry out Hitler's orders. No specific charges were ever filed against him, and he was released from captivity in 1947.

The uprising in Paris provided the Provisional Government of the French Republic and its president, Charles de Gaulle, with the authority and popular legitimacy to assert state control over mainland France. Replacing the fallen Vichy regime, de Gaulle united the politically fractured Resistance by incorporating Gaullists, socialists, Christian democrats, and communists into a government of "national unanimity".

De Gaulle consistently emphasized the primary role of the French people in liberating their own capital. In his public addresses, he urged the nation to continue its "duty of war" by advancing into the Benelux countries and Germany. By rapidly asserting civilian administration in Paris, de Gaulle sought to establish France as an undisputed victor and avoid the ambiguous, semi-occupied status imposed on Allied-occupied Italy.

Although Paris was liberated, there was still heavy fighting elsewhere in France. Large portions of the country were still occupied after the successful Operation Dragoon in southern France, which extended into the south-western region of the Vosges Mountains from 15 August to 14 September. Fighting went on in Alsace (Colmar Pocket) and Lorraine (Operation Northwind) in eastern France during the last months of 1944 until February 1945.

=== Reprisals and legal purge ===
After evacuating Laval from Paris to Belfort on 17 August, the Germans forcibly moved Vichy leader Philippe Pétain there on 20 August, later transferring both to the Sigmaringen enclave in southwestern Germany on 7 September. There, roughly 1,000 collaborators and loyalists established a short-lived government-in-exile under Fernand de Brinon, which challenged the legitimacy of de Gaulle's Provisional Government until dissolving in April 1945.

In the capital, the collapse of Vichy authority triggered an immediate wave of extrajudicial reprisals known as the Épuration sauvage (wild purge). Armed Resistance fighters and local crowds targeted suspected collaborators, municipal officials, and members of the Milice, the pro-Vichy paramilitary organization founded by Joseph Darnand. Several dozen suspected collaborators were summarily executed without trial, while women accused of "horizontal collaboration" (sexual relations with German personnel) were arrested, had their heads publicly shaved, and were paraded through the streets.

To curb vigilante violence and reassert the state's judicial monopoly, the Provisional Government established special Courts of Justice (cours de justice) in September 1944 to conduct the formal Épuration légale (legal purge). High-ranking Parisian functionaries who remained in the capital faced prosecution; notably, the former Vichy Prefect of Police, Amédée Bussière, was tried and sentenced to hard labor. Top leaders who had fled to Sigmaringen were later captured following the collapse of the Third Reich: Darnand, Laval, and de Brinon were extradited to France in 1945, tried before the High Court of Justice, and executed for treason, while Pétain had his death sentence commuted to life imprisonment.

== Legacy ==
=== Anniversaries of the liberation ===
On 25 August 2004, two military parades reminiscent of the parades of 26 and 29 August 1944, one in commemoration of the 2nd Armored Division, the other of the US 4th Infantry Division, and featuring armoured vehicles from the era, were held on the 60th anniversary of the Liberation of Paris. Under the auspices of the Senate, a jazz concert and popular dancing took place in the Jardin du Luxembourg. In the same event, homage was paid to the Spanish contribution – the first time in 60 years. Paris Mayor Bertrand Delanoë laid a plaque on a wall along the River Seine at the Quai Henri IV in the presence of surviving Spanish veterans, Javier Rojo the President of the Senate of Spain and a delegation of Spanish politicians.

On 25 August 2014, plaques were placed on the Boulevard Saint-Michel and neighbouring streets, in the vicinity of the Luxembourg Palace, seat of the French Senate, where combatants had been killed in August 1944. There was dancing in the street in every neighbourhood of the French capital and Place de la Bastille, as well as a son et lumière spectacle and dancing on the Place de l'Hôtel de Ville in the evening.

On 25 August 2019 many acts in commemoration of the liberation of Paris focused on the role of the Spanish soldiers of "La Nueve". The mayor of Paris, Anne Hidalgo, herself descendant of Spanish Republican veterans, emphasised during the inauguration of a fresco that it has taken too long to recognise this chapter of the French history.

=== Homage to the liberation martyrs ===
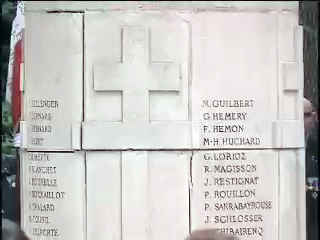
The wall of the 35 martyrs, Bois de Boulogne

On 16 May 2007, following his election as President of the Fifth French Republic, Nicolas Sarkozy organised an homage to the 35 French Resistance martyrs executed by the Germans on 16 August 1944. French popular historian Max Gallo narrated the events that took place in the woods of Bois de Boulogne, and a Parisian schoolgirl read 17-year-old French resistant Guy Môquet's final letter. During his speech, Sarkozy announced that this letter would be read in all French schools to remember the resistance spirit. After the speech, the chorale of the French Republican Guard closed the homage ceremony by singing the French Resistance's anthem "Le Chant des Partisans" ("The Partisans' song"). Following this occasion, the new president travelled to Berlin to meet German chancellor Angela Merkel, as a symbol of the Franco-German reconciliation.

== In popular culture ==
=== La Libération de Paris ===
La Libération de Paris ("The Liberation of Paris"), whose original title was L'Insurrection Nationale inséparable de la Libération Nationale ("The National Insurrection inseparable from the National Liberation"), was a short 30-minute documentary film secretly shot between 16 and 27 August by the French Resistance. It was released in French theatres on 1 September.

=== Postal material ===
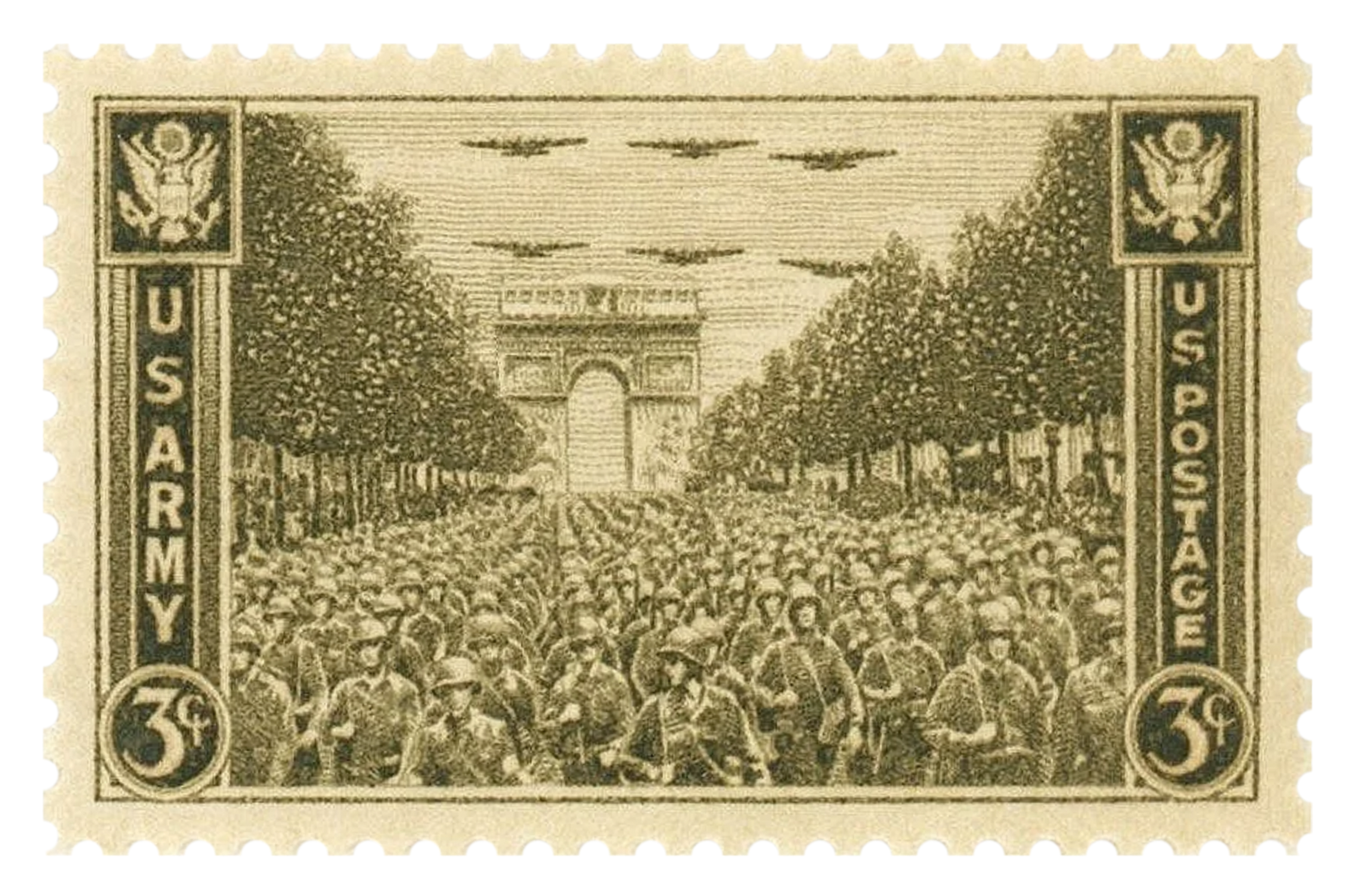
Three-cent stamp picturing the Arc de Triomphe in Paris, with marching US Army soldiers and an overflight by US Army Air Force

On 8 September 1945, the US Post Office issued a three-cent stamp commemorating the liberation of Paris from the Germans. The stamp depicted the Victory Day parade that took place on 29 August, and the covers were illustrated with images of the Ludendorff Bridge after its capture.

=== Filmography ===
The full film of "La Libération de Paris" shot in secret by small units of the French Resistance during the battle itself.

- La Libération de Paris, black-and-white film (1944), short historical documentary film shot in secret by small units of the French Resistance during the battle itself.
- The Liberation of Paris, colour film (1944) by George Stevens showing the final city shootouts, de Gaulle's triumphal arrival, arrested Germans in the streets of the city and victory parade.
- Is Paris Burning? (1966) directed by French filmmaker René Clément, with a screenplay by Gore Vidal, Francis Ford Coppola, Jean Aurenche, Pierre Bost and Claude Brulé, adapted from the 1965 book of the same title by Larry Collins and Dominique Lapierre. The film stars an international ensemble cast that includes French (Jean-Paul Belmondo, Alain Delon, Bruno Cremer, Pierre Vaneck, Jean-Pierre Cassel, Leslie Caron, Charles Boyer, Yves Montand), American (Orson Welles, Kirk Douglas, Glenn Ford, Robert Stack, Anthony Perkins, George Chakiris) and German (Gert Fröbe, Hannes Messemer, Ernst Fritz Fürbringer, Harry Meyen, Wolfgang Preiss) stars.
- Diplomacy (2014) offers an imagined account of the efforts by the Swedish diplomat Raoul Nordling to avert the destruction of the city by the German general Dietrich von Choltitz. Starring André Dussollier and Niels Arestrup, it won the César Award for Best Adaptation.

== See also ==
- Anthony Faramus
- Camp Gurs
- Camp de Rivesaltes
- Concentration camps in France
- Drancy internment camp
- Fort de Romainville
- Liberation of France
- Mémorial du maréchal Leclerc de Hauteclocque et de la Libération de Paris
- Military history of France during World War II
- Paris in World War II
- Prague uprising
- Warsaw Uprising
