= You Will Be My Son =

- Theatrical release poster
- Directed by: Gilles Legrand
- Written by: Gilles Legrand; Delphine de Vigan
- Produced by: Frédéric Brillion; Gilles Legrand
- Starring: Niels Arestrup; Lorànt Deutsch
- Cinematography: Yves Angelo
- Music by: Armand Amar
- Production company: Epithète Films
- Distributed by: Universal Pictures International
- Release date: 24 August 2011
- Running time: 102 minutes
- Country: France
- Language: French
- Budget: $5.9 million
- Box office: $6.3 million

You Will Be My Son (French: Tu seras mon fils), is a French tragedy film directed by Gilles Legrand. It is co-written by Legrand, Sandrine Cayron, and Delphine de Vigan, and stars Niels Arestrup and Lorànt Deutsch in the main roles. It was released in France on 24 August 2011.

== Plot ==
Arestrup plays Paul de Marseul, a passionate and demanding winemaker dissatisfied at the prospect of his son, Martin (Lorànt Deutsch), taking over his vineyard. He dreams of a more talented successor, and finds him in the person of Phillipe (Nicolas Bridet), the son of his steward, François (Patrick Chesnais). M. de Marseul lavishes attention and praise on Phillipe while disparaging Martin's efforts, eventually inviting Phillipe rather than Martin to attend his investiture in the Legion d'honneur.

== Reception ==
Christy Lemire of RogerEbert.com gave the film 3½ out of 4 stars, and called it "the stuff of Greek tragedy," while praising its tonal and narrative control. Le Figaro gave the film three out of four stars and called it "a great vintage."

== Cast ==
- Niels Arestrup - Paul de Marseul
- Lorànt Deutsch - Martin de Marseul
- Patrick Chesnais - François Amelot
- Nicolas Bridet - Philippe Amelot
- Anne Marivin - Alice
- Valérie Mairesse - Madeleine Amelot
- Xavier Robic - Lacourt's son
- Urbain Cancelier - Lacourt's father
- Shirley Bousquet - Jessica, barmaid
- Jean-Marc Roulot - Doctor Vermont
- Nicolas Marié - The Notary
- Hélène de Saint-Père - The Journalist
