= The Big Picture (2010 film) =

- French theatrical release poster
- Directed by: Éric Lartigau
- Screenplay by: Éric Lartigau; Laurent de Bartillat
- Based on: The Big Picture by Douglas Kennedy
- Produced by: Pierre-Ange Le Pogam
- Starring: Romain Duris; Marina Foïs; Niels Arestrup; Branka Katić
- Cinematography: Laurent Dailland
- Edited by: Juliette Welfling
- Music by: Evgueni & Sacha Galperine
- Production companies: EuropaCorp; TF1 Films; Ciby 2000
- Distributed by: EuropaCorp
- Release date: November 3, 2010
- Running time: 114 minutes
- Country: France
- Language: French
- Budget: $11.6 million
- Box office: $10 million

The Big Picture (French original title L'Homme qui voulait vivre sa vie – "The man who wanted to live his life") is a 2010 French psychological thriller directed by Éric Lartigau, and starring Romain Duris, Marina Foïs, Niels Arestrup and Catherine Deneuve. The story is adapted from the 1997 novel The Big Picture by Douglas Kennedy.

== Synopsis ==
A successful Paris lawyer with a seemingly perfect life discovers that his wife is having an affair and accidentally kills her lover in a moment of madness. He escapes the law by faking his own death, assuming his victim's identity, and making a fresh start on the Adriatic coast as a photographer. This eventually leads him to realise what was missing in his life before: he finally sees the big picture.

== Cast ==
- Romain Duris - Paul Exben
- Marina Foïs - Sarah Exben
- Niels Arestrup - Bartholomé
- Branka Katić - Ivana
- Catherine Deneuve - Anne
- Éric Ruf - Grégoire Kremer

== Reception ==
The film was critically praised. Review aggregation website Rotten Tomatoes gives the film a score of 88% based on reviews from 41 critics, with an average score of 7/10.
