= Comité de libération du cinéma français =

1943 organization of filmmakers in France

Comité de libération du cinéma français was an organization of filmmakers in France created in 1943. The most well-known members are Jacques Becker, Pierre Blanchar, Louis Daquin, Jean Painlevé, and Jean-Paul Le Chanois. Members of this organization made projects for French cinema for after the War. During the German occupation of France in World War II they made films about the Maquis, such as one showing a Maquis camp in Vercors. During the uprising in Paris, they filmed the documentary Journal de la Résistance: La Libération de Paris, (directed by André Zwoboda). Parts of this movie were used in the newsreel France Libre Actualités.

The group also created its own underground film journal called L’Ecran français in 1943. After the war, the publication became a place where film critics could debate each other, such as the iconic argument over Citizen Kane between Andre Bazin and Jean-Paul Sartre. The publication ended in 1953.
