= Dietrich von Choltitz =

German general (1894–1966)

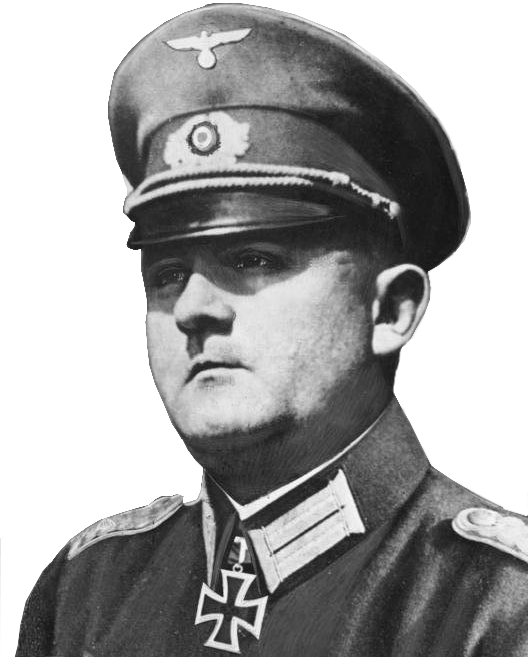
- Choltitz in 1940
- Born: Dietrich Hugo Hermann; von Choltitz; 9 November 1894; Gräflich Wiese, German Empire
- Died: 5 November 1966 (aged 71); Baden-Baden, West Germany (present-day Germany)
- Burial place: Baden-Baden Cemetery
- Spouse: Huberta von Garnier (m. 1929)
- Children: 3
- Military career
- Allegiance: German Empire; Kingdom of Saxony; Weimar Republic; Nazi Germany
- Branch: Imperial German Army; Royal Saxon Army; Reichswehr; German Army
- Service years: 1907–1944
- Rank: General der Infanterie
- Commands: LXXVI Panzer Corps; 11th Panzer Division
- Conflicts: World War I; Western Front; World War II; Invasion of Poland; Battle of Rotterdam; Eastern Front; Operation Barbarossa; Siege of Sevastopol; Battle of Kursk; Italian Campaign; Battle of Anzio; Western Front; Battle of Normandy; Liberation of Paris
- Awards: List of awards: Iron Cross 1st Class (2) 2nd Class (2) Knight's Cross; German Cross; Honour Cross of the World War; Order of St. Henry; Order of the Star of Romania; Wound Badge Silver Gold; Infantry Assault Badge; Albert Order; Civil Order of Saxony; Order of Michael the Brave; Sudetenland Medal; Crimea Shield

Dietrich Hugo Hermann von Choltitz (German pronunciation: [ˈdiːtʁɪç fɔn ˈkɔltɪts]; 9 November 1894 – 5 November 1966) was a German general. He served in the Wehrmacht ('armed forces') of Nazi Germany during World War II, as well as serving in the Reichswehr of the Weimar Republic, and the Royal Saxon Army during World War I.

Born into an aristocratic Prussian family with a long history of military service, Choltitz joined the army at a young age and saw service on the Western Front during the First World War (1914–1918). He rose to the rank of Leutnant by the end of the war and was active in the interwar period helping Germany rebuild its armed forces. In September 1939, during the invasion of Poland at the beginning of World War II, he was serving in Gerd von Rundstedt's Army Group South. In May 1940, Choltitz participated in the Battle of Rotterdam, making an air landing and seizing some of the city's key bridges.

Choltitz is chiefly remembered for his role as the last commander of Nazi-occupied Paris in 1944, when he disobeyed Adolf Hitler's orders to destroy the city, and instead surrendered it to Free French forces when they entered the city on 25 August. Choltitz later asserted that his defiance of Hitler's direct order stemmed from its obvious military futility, his affection for the French capital's history and culture, and his belief that Hitler had by then become insane. Other sources suggest that he had little control of the city thanks to the operations of the French Resistance, and could not have carried out such orders anyway.

== Early life and career ==
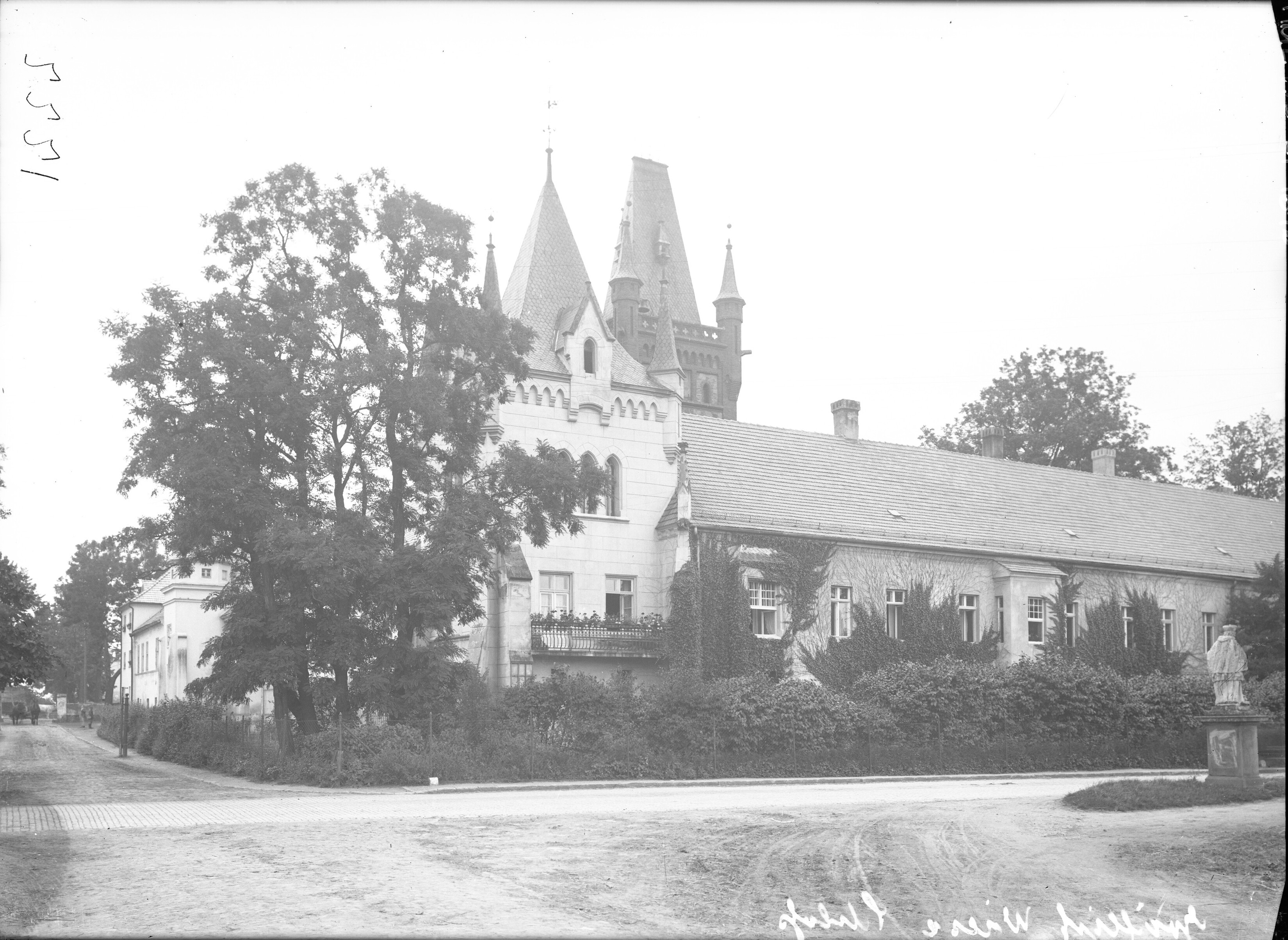
Castle in Łąka Prudnicka

Dietrich Hugo Hermann von Choltitz was born on 9 November 1894, in his family's castle in Gräflich Wiese (now Łąka Prudnicka, Poland) in the province of Silesia, 2 kilometres (1 mi) from Neustadt (now Prudnik), in the Kingdom of Prussia, then part of the German Empire. He was a son of Hans von Choltitz (1865–1935), who was a major of the Prussian Army, and his German wife Gertrud von Rosenberg. He had two brothers named Hans and Job. He came from a Moravian-Silesian noble family of Sedlnitzky von Choltitz (Odrowąż coat of arms). His uncle Hermann von Choltitz was a governor of Landkreis Neustadt O.S. from 1907 to 1920. His family owned a forest between Prudnik and Niemysłowice.

In 1907 Dietrich von Choltitz enrolled in the Dresden Cadet School.

== World War I ==
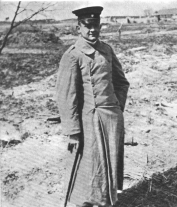
Choltitz during World War I

He joined the 8. Infanterie-Regiment Prinz Johann Georg Nr. 107 of the Royal Saxon Army as a Fähnrich ('officer candidate') just months before the First World War broke out. His unit served on the Western Front, where he fought in the First Battle of the Marne, the First Battle of Ypres, the Battle of the Somme, and the Battle of St. Quentin (1914). He was promoted to Leutnant and became adjutant of the regiment's third Battalion within a year of joining.

== Between the wars ==
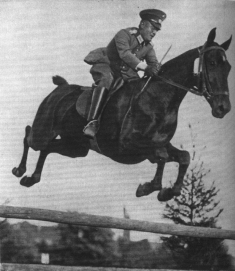
Choltitz in 1929

After World War I he returned to Prudnik, where on 20 August 1929 he married Huberta (1902–2001), the daughter of General of the Cavalry Otto von Garnier. The couple had two daughters, Maria Angelika (1930–2016) and Anna Barbara (born 1936), and a son, Timo (born 1944). He was transferred to the riding school in Soltau, as a rider he successfully participated in domestic and international riding competitions.

He remained in the Reichswehr during the Weimar Republic, becoming a cavalry captain in 1929. Promoted to major in 1937, he was made commander of third battalion, Infanterie-Regiment 16 "Oldenburg", a part of 22. Luftlande-Division. In 1938 he was promoted again, this time to Oberstleutnant ('lieutenant-colonel').

He participated in the occupation of Sudetenland in 1938.

== World War II ==
=== Invasion of Poland ===
On 18 August 1939, in preparation for Fall Weiss ('case white') – the German invasion of Poland – Choltitz was appointed the commander of the 16th Air Landing Regiment in Sagan (now Żagań, Poland).

After the Battle of Łódź, on 12 September 1939 his regiment was transported to the airport in Łódź by the transport aircraft Junkers Ju 52.

On 15 September, the regiment was temporarily assigned to the 10th Infantry Division. It participated in the Battle of the Bzura, during which Choltitz was wounded. On 19 September, he captured 3,000 Polish soldiers and a large amount of military equipment.

=== Battle of the Netherlands ===
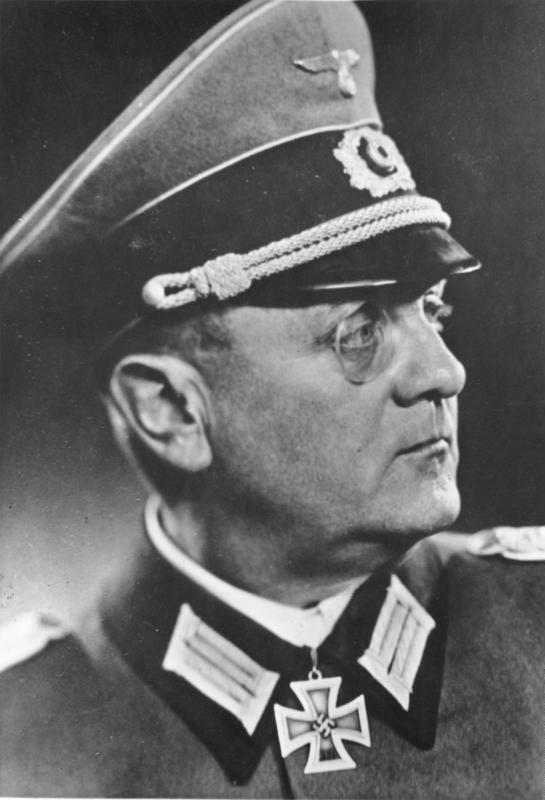
Choltitz in 1940

In May 1940, Choltitz participated in the Battle of Rotterdam, making an air landing and seizing some of the city's key bridges. As commander of the 3rd Battalion of the 16th Air Landing Regiment, he began to organize his troops after landing them at Waalhaven Air Force Base. He sent them to the bridges in Rotterdam. The Dutch had not stationed many soldiers in the southern part of the city. One unit was made up of butchers and bakers and about 90 infantrymen, the latter being reinforced by riflemen who had withdrawn from the airfield. The Dutch troops hid in houses that were on the route to the bridges. There they ambushed the approaching German troops. Both sides suffered casualties. The Germans managed to bring up a PaK ('anti-tank gun'). The Dutch had to yield under the ever-increasing pressure. The German force then moved on to the bridges, quickly followed by the bulk of 9th Company of the 16th Air Landing Regiment.

Meanwhile, the staff of 3rd Battalion of the 16th Air Landing Regiment had run into the Dutch in the square. Oberstleutnant von Choltitz′s adjutant took charge of an assault on the Dutch position but was mortally wounded in the process. When the Germans looked for another route to the bridges to bypass the Dutch stronghold, they managed to find a wedge that advancing troops had created along the quays. It was at about 09:00 when the bulk of the 3rd Battalion made contact with the defenders of the bridges.

Although the Dutch did not regain control of the city, the Germans were suffering from continuous assaults on their positions. Casualties mounted up on both sides and the German command grew increasingly worried over the status of their 500 men in the heart of Rotterdam. Oberstleutnant von Choltitz was allowed by Generalleutnant Kurt Student to withdraw his men from the northern pocket should he consider the operational situation required it.

When Captain Backer was being escorted back by Oberstleutnant von Choltitz to the Maas bridges, German bombers appeared from the south. General Schmidt, who was joined by the two Generals, Hubicki and Student, saw the planes and cried out "My God, this is going to be a catastrophe!" Panic struck German soldiers on the Noordereiland, most of whom were totally unaware of the events being played out between the commanders on both sides. They feared being attacked by their own bombers. Choltitz ordered red flares to be launched, and when the first three bombers overhead dropped their bombs the red flares were obscured by smoke. The next 24 bombers of the southern formation closed their bomb hatches and turned westwards.

After the bombardment of Rotterdam, during a meeting with the Dutch discussing the terms of surrender of all Dutch forces in Rotterdam, Generalleutnant Kurt Student was injured by a gunshot to the head. Student was very popular with his troops, and when the German forces moved to execute surrendering Dutch officers in reprisal Choltitz intervened and was able to prevent the massacre. His actions during the assault on Rotterdam earned him the Knight's Cross of the Iron Cross. In September of the same year, he was given command of the regiment, and the following spring was promoted to Oberst ('colonel').

=== Soviet Union 1941–1943 ===
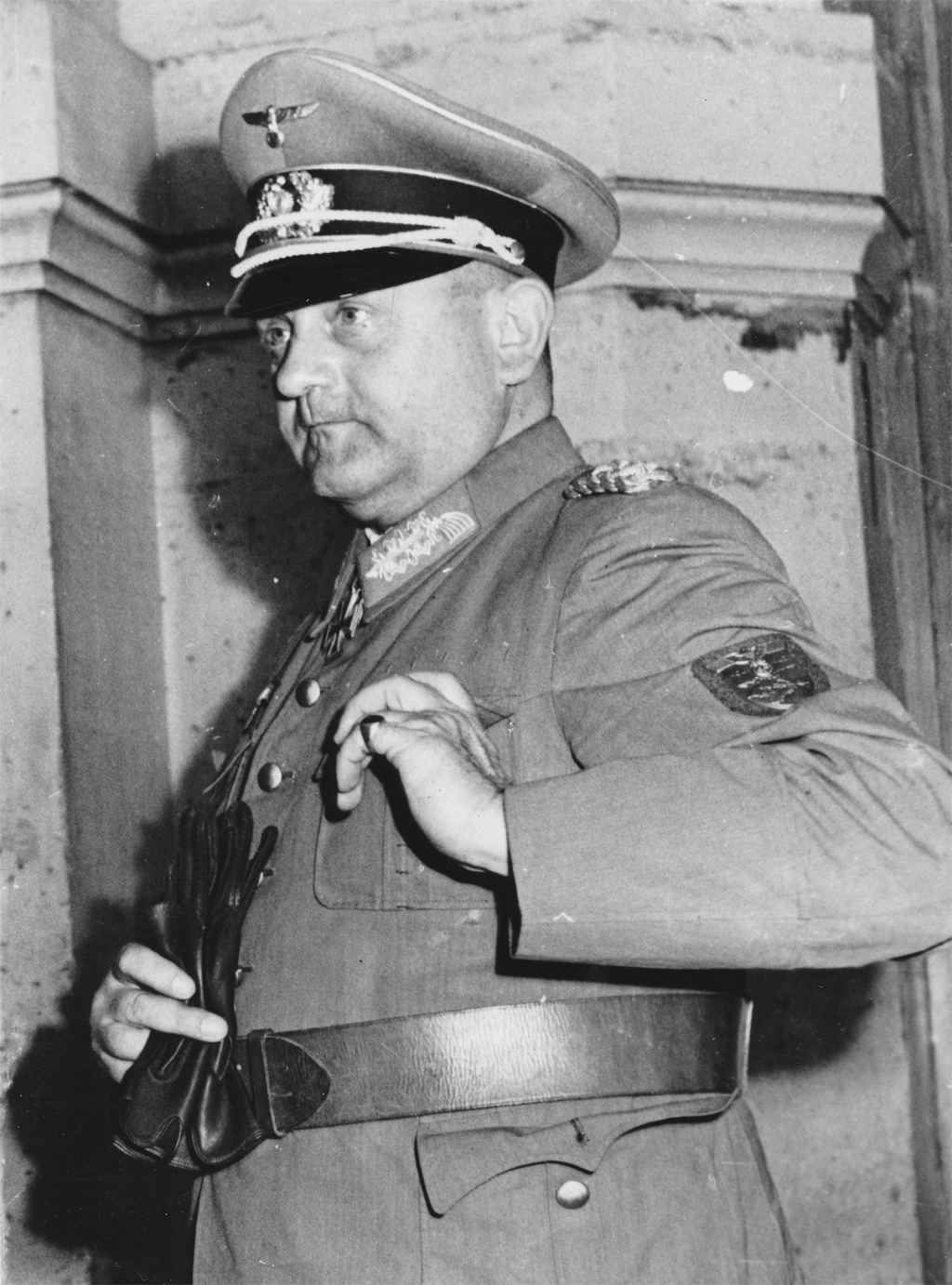
Choltitz in 1942

At the start of Operation Barbarossa, Choltitz's regiment was based in Romania, advancing as part of Army Group South into Ukraine. His route led through Bessarabia, he crossed the Dnieper river on 30 August 1941, and at the end of October he fought his way to the Crimea.

As part of Erich von Manstein's 11th Army, the regiment fought in the siege of Sevastopol. The siege was bloody for Choltitz's regiment, which was reduced in numbers from 4,800 men to just 349.

During the harsh winter at the turn of 1941 and 1942, Choltitz struggled with heart problems and also began to show symptoms of chronic obstructive pulmonary disease. Promoted to Generalmajor soon after, he was made acting commander of 260th Infantry division in 1942. He was then promoted to Generalleutnant the following year and given command of 11th Panzer Division, which he led during the Battle of Kursk.

=== Western front 1944 ===
In March 1944, Choltitz was transferred to the Italian theatre of operations, where he was made deputy commander of LXXVI Panzer Corps and participated in the Battle of Anzio and Monte Cassino. Transferred to the Western Front in June 1944, he took command of LXXXIV Army Corps, which he commanded against the Allied breakout from Normandy.

== Military Governor of Paris ==
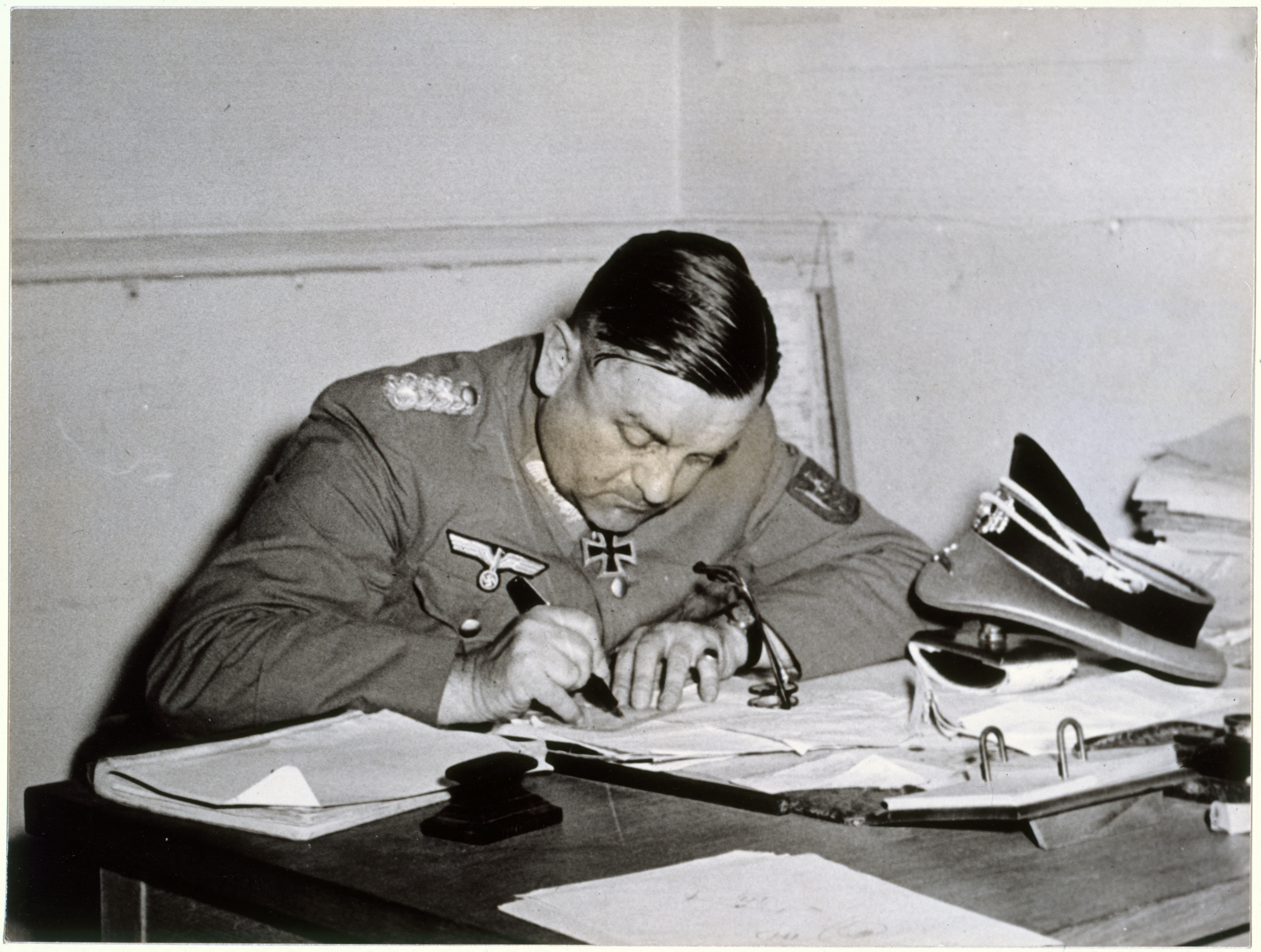
Dietrich von Choltitz signing the Nazi surrender after the liberation of Paris

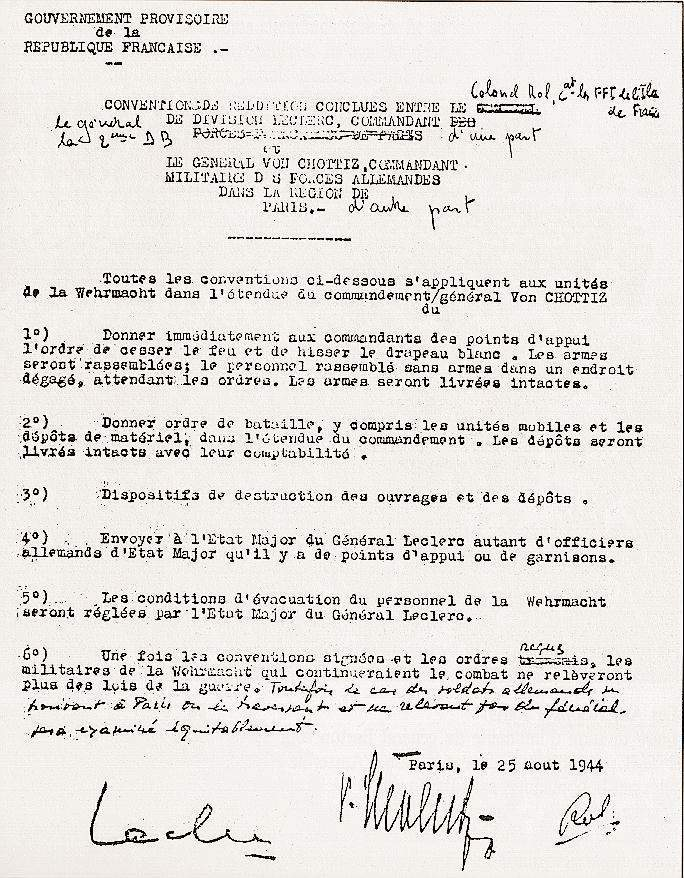
Surrender of the German garrison in Paris, signed by General von Choltitz on 25 August, received by General Leclerc and countersigned by Colonel Rol-Tanguy

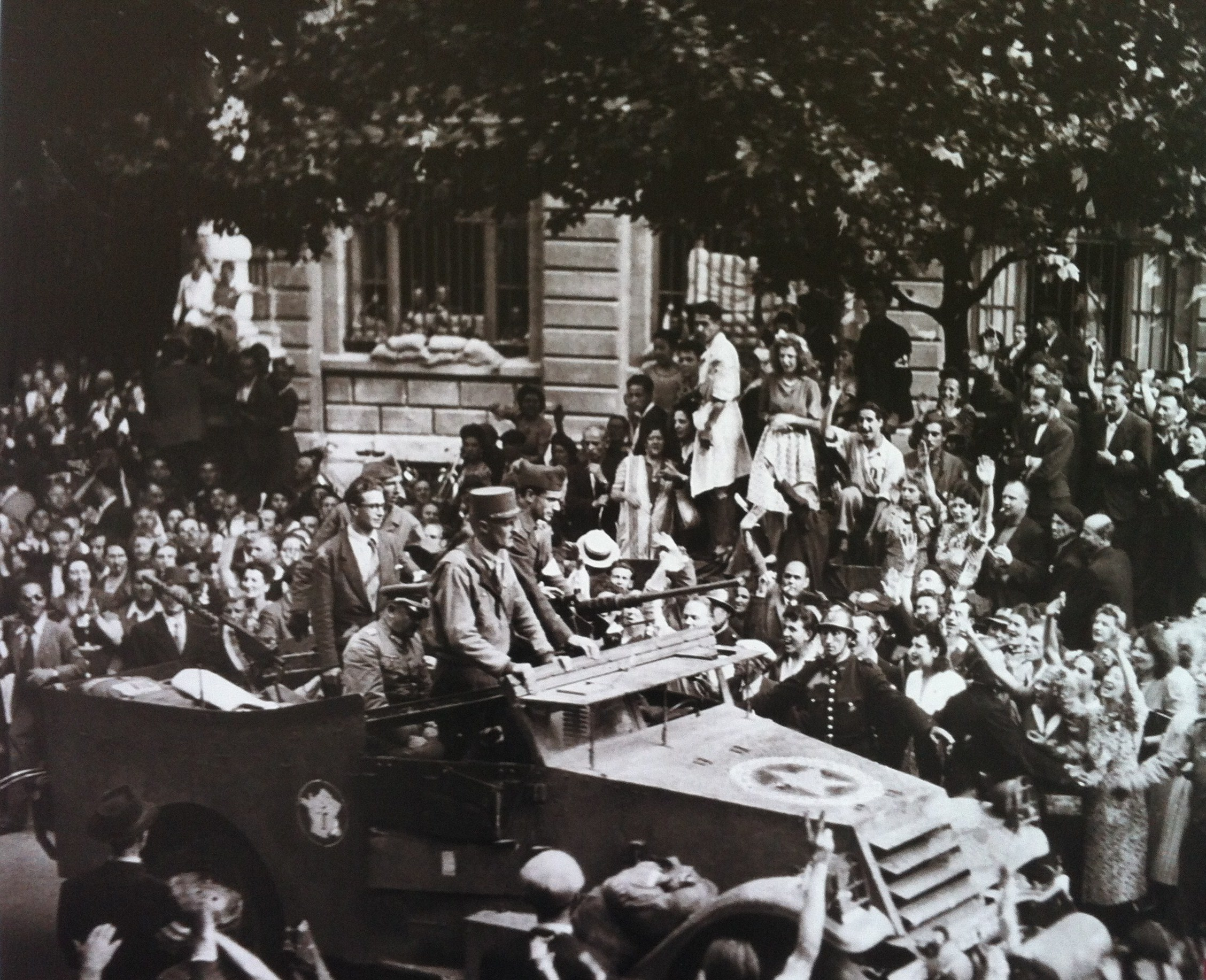
Dietrich von Choltitz with Philippe Leclerc de Hauteclocque and Jacques Soustelle in the M3 Scout Car

On 1 August 1944, Choltitz was promoted to General der Infanterie, and on 7 August was appointed the military governor of Paris, making him Hitler's new "strongman". Arriving on 8 August, he set up headquarters in the Hotel Meurice on the Rue De Rivoli, and found few resources at his disposal, and only 20,000 troops, mostly unmotivated conscripts.

On 15 August 1944, the Paris police went on strike, followed on 19 August by a general insurrection led by the French Communist Party. The German garrison under Choltitz fought back but was far too small to quell the uprising, and they lost control of many public buildings, many roads were blocked, and German vehicles and communications were damaged. With the help of the Swedish consul-general in Paris, Raoul Nordling, a ceasefire was brokered with the insurgents on 20 August, but many Resistance groups did not accept it, and a series of skirmishes continued on the next day.

On 23 August, Hitler, by cable, gave the order to destroy the city: "Paris darf nicht oder nur als Trümmerfeld in die Hand des Feindes fallen" (transl. Paris must not pass into the enemy's hands, except as a field of ruins), after which explosives were laid at various bridges and monuments (which later had to be de-mined).

With the arrival of Allied troops on the edge of the city at dawn the next day on the 24th, Choltitz made the decision not to destroy the city, and on 25 August, surrendered the German garrison at the Caserne de la Cité. He did so not to the Supreme Allied Command, but rather to representatives of the provisional government, the Free French. A 1996 article by the New York Times claimed that due to his supposed refusal to destroy the city, Choltitz is often seen as the "Saviour of Paris".

Hitler did not completely give up on the destruction, with the Luftwaffe conducting an incendiary bombing raid on 26 August, and V2 rockets fired from Belgium, causing extensive damage.

The events leading up to the surrender were the subject of a 1951 memoir written by General von Choltitz (published in French in the 1960s as From Sevastopol to Paris: A soldier among the soldiers) where he took credit for disobeying Hitler's orders and saving Paris because of its obvious military futility, his affection for the French capital's history and culture, and his belief that Hitler had by then become insane. His version of events were the basis for the 1965 book and 1966 film, Is Paris Burning? (repeated as factual in many sources, and a 2019 publication). His motivation not to destroy the city may have been in part because it was a futile and destructive gesture, but also in order to ensure his better treatment after capitulation.

The memoirs also state that he was persuaded to spare the city in part by an all-night meeting with Nordling on the night of 24 August. This event was depicted in the 2014 film Diplomacy in which Nordling persuades Choltitz to spare the city in return for a pledge to protect his family, which was reported as factual following the publication of his memoirs in some newspaper stories, but lacks any corroboration. He did hold several meetings with Nordling, along with the president of the municipal council, Pierre Taittinger, hoping to limit the bloodshed and damage to the city, and which led to the release of some political prisoners.

New research undertaken by historians, primarily in the 2000s and 2010s, was made possible by the declassification of French and German administrative archives from that period. These new studies have allowed for a reassessment of the role that General Dietrich von Choltitz actually played in relation to Hitler’s intention to destroy Paris. General Leclerc’s testimony had already indicated that the military governor of Paris, at the moment of his arrest by the Allies, was primarily concerned with saving his own life.

Historical documentary filmmaker Françoise Cros de Fabrique, drawing on previously unpublished documents discovered in these archives, demonstrates in a lengthy 2019 documentary that this legend surrounding Choltitz has been perpetuated without any serious historical verification; for while she confirms that Hitler did indeed attempt to annihilate the French capital, it also makes clear that Choltitz never had any real desire to oppose it. In fact, it was simply due to a lack of resources and time that he was unable to carry out the orders.

== Captivity and later life ==
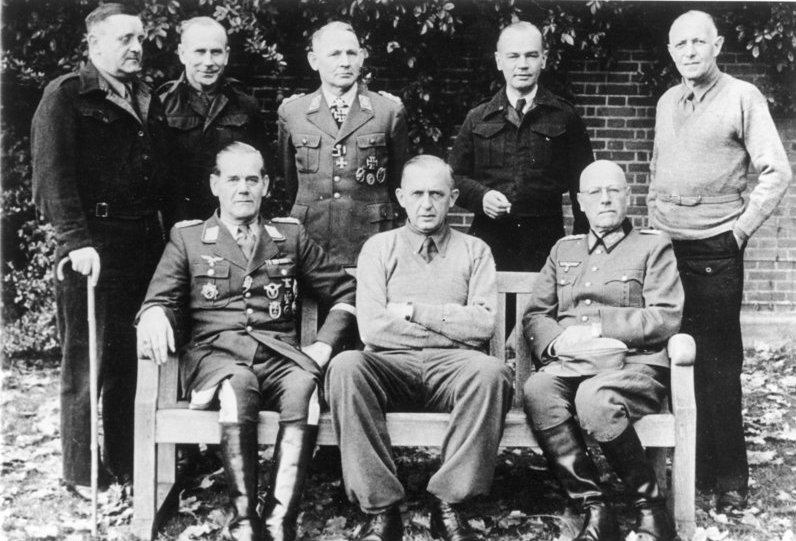
Dietrich von Choltitz (standing far left) at Trent Park in London

Choltitz was held for the remainder of the war at Trent Park, in north London, with other senior German officers. Choltitz later was transferred to Camp Clinton in Mississippi. No specific charges were ever filed against him, and he was released from captivity in 1947. In 1956 he visited his wartime headquarters at the Hôtel Meurice in Paris. Reportedly the long-time head barman of the hotel recognised the short, rotund man with "impossibly correct posture" wandering around the bar as if in a daze. After the manager of the hotel met him in the bar, he asked to see his old room. After seeing his old quarters for no more than fifteen minutes, Choltitz declined the manager's offer of champagne and left the hotel to meet with Pierre Taittinger.

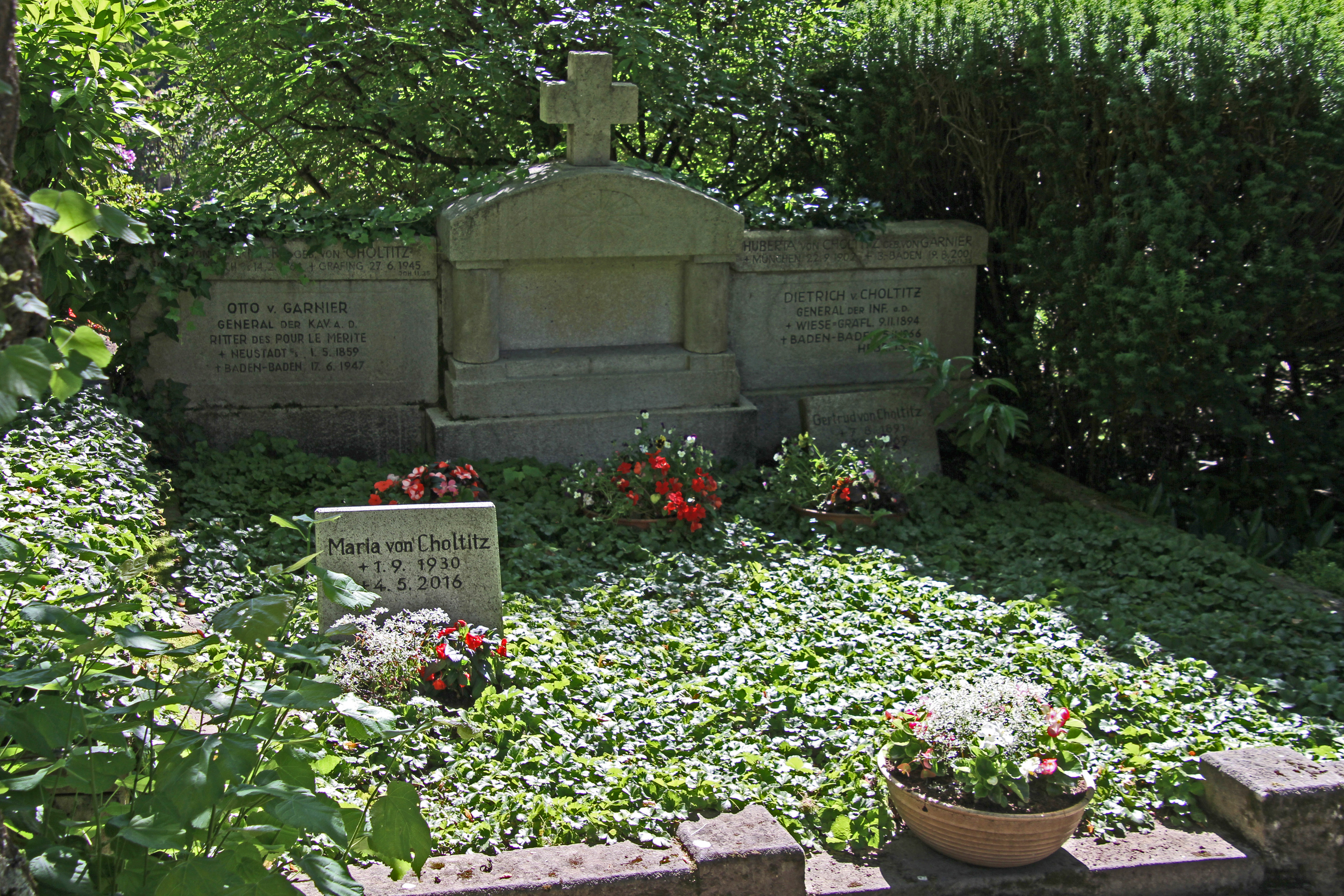
Grave of Dietrich von Choltitz and Otto von Garnier in Baden-Baden

Choltitz died on 5 November 1966 from a longstanding war illness (pulmonary emphysema) in the city hospital of Baden-Baden. Four days later, he was buried at the city cemetery of Baden-Baden in the presence of high-ranking French officers, including colonels Wagner (Military Commander of Baden-Baden), Ravinel, and Omézon. Baden-Baden was the French headquarters in Germany after the end of the Second World War.

Choltitz was the last German owner of the castle in Łąka Prudnicka, his birthplace (until 1945 it had been part of Germany as Gräflich Wiese). In 2016 his son, Timo, tried to get it back during his visit in Prudnik, but without success.

=== Complicity in war crimes ===
During his internment in Trent Park many of the officers' private conversations were secretly recorded by the British in the hope that they might reveal strategic information. In one such conversation, on 29 August 1944, Choltitz was quoted as saying "The worst job I ever carried out – which however I carried out with great consistency – was the liquidation of the Jews. I carried out this thoroughly and entirely." Randall Hansen says that there is a lack of corroboration but that since many German generals committed atrocities it is possible, even probable, that Choltitz ordered the massacre of Jews. He observed that "it is easier to believe that Choltitz was the sort of unreflective anti-Semite that one would expect, given his age, class and profession." Selected transcripts were dramatized in the History Channel five-part series The Wehrmacht (2008). In the episode "The Crimes", General von Choltitz is quoted as saying in October 1944, (Note: According to Neitzel (2005), the original words were: "Ich habe meine Soldaten verführt, an diesen Mist zu glauben, habe die Bevölkerung, die das Offizierskorps noch als etwas Würdiges sah, veranlasst, auch ohne Überlegung mitzumachen. Ich fühle mich auf das Äußerste beschämt! Vielleicht sind wir viel mehr schuld als dieses ungebildete Viehzeugs, was ja sowieso sein ganzes Leben lang nichts anderes hört.")

We all share the guilt. We went along with everything, and we half-took the Nazis seriously, instead of saying "to Hell with you and your stupid nonsense". I misled my soldiers into believing this rubbish. I feel utterly ashamed of myself. Perhaps we bear even more guilt than these uneducated animals. (Note: An apparent reference to Hitler and his supporting Nazi Party members.)

At the very least, Choltitz was fully aware that the Nazis were committing mass murder against the Jews. For example, Choltitz estimated that the Nazis shot 36,000 Jews from Sevastopol.

== Awards ==
- Iron Cross (Note: Awards of the 1939 version of the Iron Cross to holders of the 1914 version are represented with a Clasp above the 1914 Cross)
  - 1st Class (2)
  - 2nd Class (2)
  - Knight's Cross (Note: Awarded as Oberstleutnant and commander of III./Infanterie-Regiment 16. His Knight's Cross of the Iron Cross was presented and is registered by the Luftwaffe-Personalamt (LWA, 'air force staff office'). The Heerespersonalamt (HPA, 'army staff office') received Oak Leaves to his Knight's Cross nomination for Generalmajor von Choltitz on 19 January 1943 for his leadership of the XVII. Armee-Korps. The HPA did not approve the nomination on 27 January 1943.) (18 May 1940)
- German Cross (8 February 1942)
- Honour Cross of the World War (WWI)
- Order of St. Henry (26 December 1917)
- Order of the Star of Romania (1943)
- Wound Badge
  - Silver (1918)
  - Gold (25 March 1943)
- Infantry Assault Badge, WWII
- Albert Order, Saxony
- Civil Order of Saxony
- Order of Michael the Brave, Romania (6 October 1942)
- Sudetenland Medal (1938)
- Crimea Shield (July 1942)

== In popular culture ==
- Is Paris Burning?, a French-American ensemble cast production of 1966, with Gert Fröbe playing Choltitz. (Choltitz died around the time this film was being generally released in Europe and America).
- Diplomacy, a French-German film of 2014 directed by Volker Schlöndorff, based on the play Diplomatie by Cyril Gely. Depicting events in his headquarters at the Hotel Meurice the night before the Liberation of Paris, Niels Arestrup portrays Choltitz.
- Secrets of the Dead: Bugging Hitler's Soldiers, a PBS documentary which examines how MI19 spied on senior German prisoners of war.
- Pod presją ('under pressure'): a Polish documentary directed in 2015 by Dagmara Spolniak.

== See also ==
- Liberation of Paris

== Notes ==
Military offices
Preceded by General der Panzertruppe Hermann Balck	Commander of 11.Panzer Division; 4 March 1943 – 15 May 1943	Succeeded by Generalleutnant Johann Mickl
Preceded by General der Panzertruppe Otto von Knobelsdorff	Commander of XLVIII. Panzerkorps; 6 May 1943 – 30 August 1943	Succeeded by General der Panzertruppe Otto von Knobelsdorff
Preceded by General der Panzertruppe Otto von Knobelsdorff	Commander of XLVIII. Panzerkorps; 30 September 1943 – 21 October 1943	Succeeded by General der Panzertruppe Heinrich Eberbach
