= Diplomacy (2014 film) =

- Film poster
- Directed by: Volker Schlöndorff
- Screenplay by: Cyril Gely; Volker Schlöndorff
- Based on: Diplomatie by Cyril Gely
- Produced by: Marc de Bayser; Frank Le Wita
- Starring: André Dussollier; Niels Arestrup; Burghart Klaußner; Robert Stadlober; Charlie Nelson; Jean-Marc Roulot
- Cinematography: Michel Amathieu
- Edited by: Virginie Bruant
- Music by: Jörg Lemberg
- Production companies: Film Oblige; Gaumont; Blueprint Film; Arte
- Distributed by: Gaumont (France); Koch Media (Germany)
- Release dates: 12 February 2014 (Berlin); 5 March 2014 (France); 28 August 2014 (Germany)
- Running time: 88 minutes
- Countries: France; Germany
- Languages: French; German
- Budget: $4.8 million
- Box office: $4.2 million

Diplomacy (German and French: Diplomatie) is a 2014 Franco-German historical drama film directed by Volker Schlöndorff and adapted from the play Diplomatie by Cyril Gély, which premiered in 2011. Set in Paris in 1944, the film offers an imagined account of the efforts by the Swedish diplomat Raoul Nordling to avert the destruction of the city by the German general Dietrich von Choltitz. The film premiered at the 64th Berlin International Film Festival on 12 February 2014. It was also screened at the Telluride Film Festival in August 2014. It won the César Award for Best Adaptation at the 40th César Awards.

== Plot ==
As the Allied Forces move toward Paris, Adolf Hitler commands General Dietrich von Choltitz to destroy the city. Choltitz sends engineering teams to demolish the city's famous landmarks and to overflow the Seine, led by Lieutenant Hegger and advised by a captured Parisian engineer named M. Lanvin. The landmarks targeted include the Eiffel Tower, the Louvre, the Place de la Concorde, Notre Dame Cathedral and Les Invalides.

The Swedish consul, Raoul Nordling, sneaks into the general's office in the Hotel Meurice by means of a secret staircase originally built for a famous courtesan who lived there. He points out the loss of innocent lives if the demolition goes through, and asks the general not to do it. The general is not swayed and is determined to do his duty.

Parisians start to revolt against the German patrols. Fighting fills the streets. Choltitz reveals that through its policy of Sippenhaft, the Nazi government punishes the families of disobedient officers. Nordling tries to downplay its significance, but Choltitz points out that it was enacted right as he was promoted, meaning that Hitler has his eyes on Choltitz.

Nordling offers the chance for the French Resistance to try to evacuate Choltitz's family. He confesses that he would not be able to choose between saving his family and saving Paris, were he in Choltitz's position. However, if he chooses Paris, the world will remember him as a hero. Choltitz relents and cancels the demolition. Lt Hegger tries to trigger it anyway, but is shot by Lanvin.

After the fall of Nazi Germany, Choltitz serves a two-year prison sentence for his earlier actions during the Siege of Sevastopol. Nordling is awarded a medal for his persuasion of Choltitz in Paris, but he passes it over to Choltitz, recognizing him as the real hero.

== Cast ==
- André Dussollier as Raoul Nordling
- Niels Arestrup as General von Choltitz
- Burghart Klaußner as Hauptmann Werner Ebernach
- Robert Stadlober as Leutnant Ernst von Bressensdorf
- Charlie Nelson as the concierge
- Jean-Marc Roulot as Jacques Lanvin
- Stefan Wilkening as Unteroffizier Mayer
- Thomas Arnold as Leutnant Hegger

== Critical reception ==
The movie was well received by the critics. Review aggregator Rotten Tomatoes reports that 93% of 45 critics gave the film a positive review, for an average rating of 7.4/10. The site's consensus states that "For filmgoers who value character development and smart dialogue over plot, Diplomacy yields rich, powerfully acted rewards."

Brenda Benthien of kinocritics.com judged the "theatrical tour-de-force" was "a Valentine to Schlöndorff’s beloved Paris".
