= Niels Arestrup =

French-Danish actor, film director and screenwriter (1949–2024)

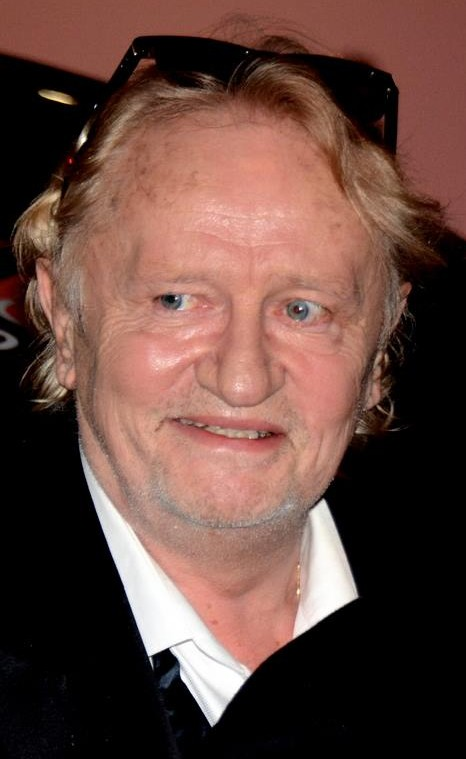
- Arestrup at the 2014 César Awards
- Born: 8 February 1949; Montreuil, France
- Died: 1 December 2024 (aged 75); Ville-d'Avray, France
- Occupations: Actor; film director; screenwriter
- Years active: 1960s–2023
- Spouse: Isabelle Le Nouvel (m. 2012)
- Children: 2

Niels Arestrup (French pronunciation: [nils aʁestʁyp]; 8 February 1949 – 1 December 2024) was a French-Danish actor, film director and screenwriter.

== Early life and career ==
Arestrup was born in Montreuil on 8 February 1949, into a family of modest means; his father was Danish and his mother was Breton. After failing his baccalaureate in 1968, he supported himself with a series of odd jobs whilst, inspired by her television appearances, studying acting under Tania Balachova. Subsequently, he began his career in theatre.

As of 2014, he was the only winner of three César Awards for Best Supporting Actor, won for The Beat That My Heart Skipped and A Prophet, then Quai d'Orsay. The two first films were directed by Jacques Audiard.

In 2017, he won the Globes de Cristal Award for Best Actor in a Play for his work on Acting. In 2019, he won the Molière Award for Best Actor for his work on Red. He was previously nominated in this same category in 2000 for Copenhagen, in 2006 for Letters to a Young Poet, and in 2012 for Diplomacy.

== Personal life and death ==
In 2012, after a ten year relationship, Arestrup married Isabelle Le Nouvel, an actress, screenwriter, and author. The same year, they had twins, a boy and a girl.

Arestrup died following a long illness in Ville-d'Avray, France, on 1 December 2024 at the age of 75.

== Theatre ==
Year	Title	Author	Director
1970	Life Is a Dream	Pedro Calderón de la Barca	Jean Gillibert
1970–1971	The Misanthrope	Molière	Jean Gillibert
1970–1971	The Game of Love and Chance	Pierre de Marivaux	Michel-H Dufresne
1972–1973	Crime and Punishment	Fyodor Dostoyevsky	André Barsacq
1973–1974	La Famille	Lodewijk de Boer	Derek Goldby
1975	The Hot l Baltimore	Lanford Wilson	Alexandre Arcady
1976	Gilles de Rais	Roger Planchon	Roger Planchon
1978	Deathwatch	Jean Genet	Claude Mathieu
1979	Platonov	Anton Chekhov	Gabriel Garran
1981–1982	The Cherry Orchard	Anton Chekhov	Peter Brook
1982	The Lover	Harold Pinter	Philippe Ferran
1982	La Dernière Nuit de l'été	Aleksei Arbuzov	Yves Bureau
1983	Miss Julie	August Strindberg	Christian Benedetti & Andreas Voutsinas
1984	Dom Juan	Molière	Maurice Bénichou
1985	Fool for Love	Sam Shepard	Andreas Voutsinas
1986	B29	Alain Page	Derek Goldby
1987	2050, le radeau de la mort	Harald Müller	Hans-Peter Cloos
1988	Three Sisters	Anton Tchekhov	Maurice Bénichou
1989	The Seagull	Anton Tchekhov	Andrei Konchalovsky
1989	Sade, concert d'enfers	Enzo Cormann	Philippe Adrien
1989–1990	The Misanthrope	Molière	Pierre Pradinas
1990	Tout contre un petit bois	Jean-Michel Ribes	Jean-Michel Ribes
1991	Ecrit sur l'Eau	Éric-Emmanuel Schmitt	Niels Arestrup
1993	Letters to a Young Poet	Rainer Maria Rilke	Niels Arestrup
1995	La Musica deuxième	Marguerite Duras	Bernard Murat
1996	Who's Afraid of Virginia Woolf?	Edward Albee	John Berry
1997–1998	Who's Afraid of Virginia Woolf?	Edward Albee	Jean-Luc Revol
1999	Étoiles	Pierre Laville	Maurice Bénichou
1999–2000	Copenhagen	Michael Frayn	Michael Blakemore
2000	Fernando Krapp m’a écrit cette lettre	Tankred Dorst	Bernard Murat
2001	Inserts	John Byrum	Niels Arestrup
2002	Phèdre	Jean Racine	Jacques Weber
2002	Une nuit arabe	Roland Schimmelpfennig	Frédéric Bélier-Garcia
2003	Each In His Own Way	Luigi Pirandello	Bernard Murat
2004	Quartet	Heiner Müller	Hans-Peter Cloos
2004	L'Homme, la bête et la vertu	Luigi Pirandello	Jean-Claude Idée
2005–2006	Letters to a Young Poet	Rainer Maria Rilke	Niels Arestrup
2007	Eva	Nicolas Bedos	Daniel Colas
2008	Beyrouth Hôtel	Rémi de Vos	Niels Arestrup
2011–2012	Diplomacy	Cyril Gely	Stéphan Meldegg
2014–2016	Le Souper	Jean-Claude Brisville	Daniel Benoin
2016–2018	Acting	Xavier Durringer	Xavier Durringer
2018–2019	Skorpios au loin	Isabelle le Nouvel	Jean-Louis Benoît
2019–2020	Red	John Logan	Jérémie Lippmann
2021–2023	88 fois l'infini	Isabelle le Nouvel	Jérémie Lippmann

== Filmography ==
=== Cinema ===
Year	Title	Role	Director	Notes
1974	Stavisky	Rudolph	Alain Resnais	
1974	Miss O'Gynie et les hommes fleurs	Yves	Samy Pavel	
1976	Lumière	Nano	Jeanne Moreau	
1976	The Big Night	Léon	Francis Reusser	
1976	Je Tu Il Elle	The driver	Chantal Akerman	
1976	Demain les mômes	Philippe	Jean Pourtalé	
1976	If I Had to Do It All Over Again	Henri Lanot	Claude Lelouch	
1977	The Apprentice Sorcerers	Danton	Edgardo Cozarinsky	
1977	The More It Goes, the Less It Goes	Vincent	Michel Vianey	
1978	The Song of Roland	Oton	Frank Cassenti	
1979	Memoirs of a French Whore	André	Daniel Duval	
1979	La passion d'une femme sans coeur	Karl	Moïse Maatouk	Short
1980	The Woman Cop	Dominique Allier	Yves Boisset	
1981	Seuls	Jean	Francis Reusser	
1981	Du blues dans la tête	Dan	Hervé Palud	
1982	One Man's War	Narrator	Edgardo Cozarinsky	Documentary
1984	The Future Is Woman	Gordon	Marco Ferreri	
1985	Diesel	Nelson	Robert Kramer	
1985	Among Wolves	Mike	José Giovanni	
1985	Sincerely Charlotte	Mathieu	Caroline Huppert	
1986	Le goûter chez Niels	Niels	Didier Martiny	Short
1987	La rumba	Commissioner Detaix	Roger Hanin	
1987	Charlie Dingo	William	Gilles Béhat	
1987	Barbablù, Barbablù	Gastone	Fabio Carpi	
1988	Ville étrangère	Gregor Keuschnig	Didier Goldschmidt	
1989	Doux amer	Jean	Franck Apprederis	
1991	Meeting Venus	Zoltan Szanto	István Szabó	
1994	Délit mineur	Claude	Francis Girod	
1998	Rewind	Fabrice Rivail	Sergio Gobbi	
2000	Le pique-nique de Lulu Kreutz	Jascha Steg	Didier Martiny	
2002	A Private Affair	Monsieur Siprien	Guillaume Nicloux	
2002	Speak to Me of Love	Richard	Sophie Marceau	
2005	The Beat That My Heart Skipped	Robert Seyr	Jacques Audiard	
2006	Les fragments d'Antonin	Professor Lantier	Gabriel Le Bomin	
2007	Le candidat	Georges	Niels Arestrup	
2007	La part animale	Henri Chaumier	Sébastien Jaudeau	
2007	The Diving Bell and the Butterfly	Roussin	Julian Schnabel	
2009	A Prophet	César Luciani	Jacques Audiard	
2009	L'affaire Farewell	Vallier	Christian Carion	
2010	Sarah's Key	Jules Dufaure	Gilles Paquet-Brenner	
2010	Small World	Thomas Senn	Bruno Chiche	
2010	The Big Picture	Bartholomé	Éric Lartigau	
2011	War Horse	Grandfather	Steven Spielberg	
2011	You Will Be My Son	Paul de Marseul	Gilles Legrand	
2012	Our Children	André Pinget	Joachim Lafosse	
2013	The French Minister	Claude Maupas	Bertrand Tavernier	
2014	96 hours	Victor Kancel	Frédéric Schoendoerffer	
2014	The Dune	Reuven	Yossi Aviram	
2014	Diplomacy	Général von Choltitz	Volker Schlöndorff	
2015	By the Sea	Michel	Angelina Jolie	
2015	Papa lumière	Jacques	Ada Loueilh	
2017	Return to Montauk	Walter	Volker Schlöndorff	
2017	See You Up There	President Marcel Péricourt	Albert Dupontel	
2018	At Eternity's Gate	Madman	Julian Schnabel	
2020	Villa Caprice	Luc Germon	Bernard Stora	
2023	Divertimento	Sergiu Celibidache	Marie-Castille Mention-Schaar	

=== Television ===
Year	Title	Role	Director	Notes
1974	La dernière carte	Wilhem Kasda	Marcel Cravenne	TV movie
1974	Messieurs les jurés	Jean-Roger Pasquier	André Michel	TV series (1 episode)
1977	Thaw	Jean-Luc	Markus Imhoof	TV movie
1977	Cinéma 16	Brandy	Bernard Dubois	TV series (1 episode)
1978	Lulu	Schwarz	Marcel Bluwal	TV movie
1979	Le tourbillon des jours	Germain	Jacques Doniol-Valcroze	TV mini-series
1980	Bruges la morte	Hugues Viane	Alain Dhénaut	TV movie
1980	Le petit théâtre d'Antenne 2	The client	Jacques Audoir	TV series (1 episode)
1981	Les héritiers	Serge	Bruno Gantillon	TV series (1 episode)
1981	Mon meilleur Noël	The father	Gabriel Axel	TV series (1 episode)
1982	La cerisaie	Lopakhine	Peter Brook	TV movie
1982	La danse de mort	Kurt	Claude Chabrol	TV movie
1982	Le retour d'Elisabeth Wolff	Stan Pilgrim	Josée Dayan	TV movie
1982	Les secrets de la princesse de Cadignan	Rastignac	Jacques Deray	TV movie
1983	Les poneys sauvages	Ben	Robert Mazoyer	TV mini-series
1984	Mademoiselle Julie	Jean	Yves-André Hubert	TV movie
1987	Série noire	Angelo	Daniel Duval	TV series (1 episode)
1988	La ruelle au clair de lune	Professor Hans Klemm	Édouard Molinaro	TV movie
1989	Manon Roland	Danton	Édouard Molinaro	TV movie
1989	The Post Office Girl	Ferdinand Farner	Édouard Molinaro	TV mini-series
1991	La grande dune	Keiser	Bernard Stora	TV movie
1992	La femme abandonnée	Oskar de Wilno	Édouard Molinaro	TV movie
1993	Albert Savarus	Albert Savarus	Alexandre Astruc	TV movie
1995	Les derniers jours de la victime	Mendizabal	Bruno Gantillon	TV movie
2000	La part de l'ombre	Charles Oberlé	Philippe Venault	TV movie
2000	Fernando Krapp m'a écrit cette lettre	Fernando Krapp	Yves di Tullio & Bernard Murat	TV movie
2002	Les enquêtes d'Éloïse Rome	Van Rooten	Didier Le Pêcheur	TV series (1 episode)
2006	Le Rainbow Warrior	The Duke	Pierre Boutron	TV movie
2009	Suite noire	Gérard	Emmanuelle Bercot	TV series (1 episode)
2016	Republican Gangsters	Francis Laugier	Ziad Doueiri	TV series (8 episodes)
2017	Capitaine Marleau	Hervé Gerfaut	Josée Dayan	TV series (1 episode)
2019	Calls	Adam	Timothée Hochet	TV series (1 episode)
2022	Black Butterflies	Albert Desiderio	Olivier Abbou	TV series (6 episodes)

=== As director/writer ===
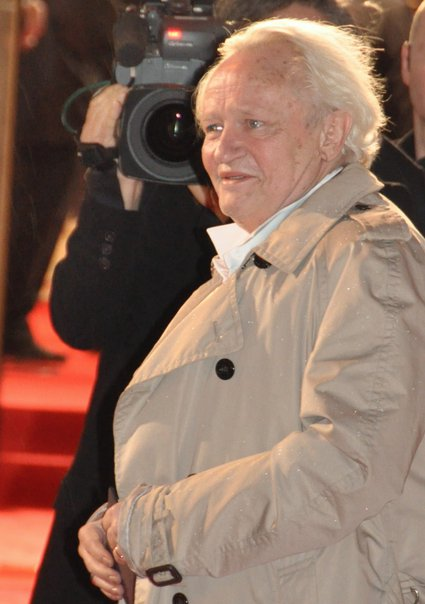
Arestrup in 2010 to the 35th César Awards

Year	Title	Notes
1981	Du blues dans la tête	Writer
2007	The Candidate	Director and writer

== Literature ==
=== Book ===
Year	Title
2001	Tous mes incendies

== Accolades ==
Year	Award	Category	Film	Result
1999	Prix du Syndicat de la critique	Best Actor	Copenhagen	Won
1999	Molière Award	Best Actor	Copenhagen	Nominated
2005	Molière Award	Best Actor	Letters to a Young Poet	Nominated
2006	César Award	Best Supporting Actor	The Beat That My Heart Skipped	Won
2010	César Award	Best Supporting Actor	A Prophet	Won
2010	Los Angeles Film Critics Association Award	Best Supporting Actor	A Prophet	Won
2010	International Cinephile Society	Best Supporting Actor	A Prophet	Won
2010	International Online Cinema Award	Best Supporting Actor	A Prophet	Nominated
2010	Italian Online Movie Award	Best Supporting Actor	A Prophet	Nominated
2011	Molière Award	Best Actor	Diplomacy	Nominated
2011	César Award	Best Supporting Actor	The Big Picture	Nominated
2013	Seattle International Film Festival	Best Actor	You Will Be My Son	Nominated
2014	César Award	Best Supporting Actor	The French Minister	Won
2014	Globe de Cristal Awards	Best Actor	The French Minister	Nominated
2015	César Award	Best Actor	Diplomacy	Nominated
2015	Valladolid International Film Festival	Best Actor	Diplomacy	Won
2016	L'Association des Critiques de Séries	Best Actor	Baron Noir	Nominated
2017	ACS Awards	Best Actor	Republican Gangsters	Nominated
2017	Globe de Cristal Awards	Best Actor in a Play	Acting	Won
2018	César Award	Best Supporting Actor	See You Up There	Nominated
2020	Molière Award	Best Actor	Red	Won
2023	ACS Awards	Best Supporting Role in a TV Series : 40 minutes	Black Butterflies	Nominated
