= Raoul Nordling =

Swedish diplomat (1882–1962)

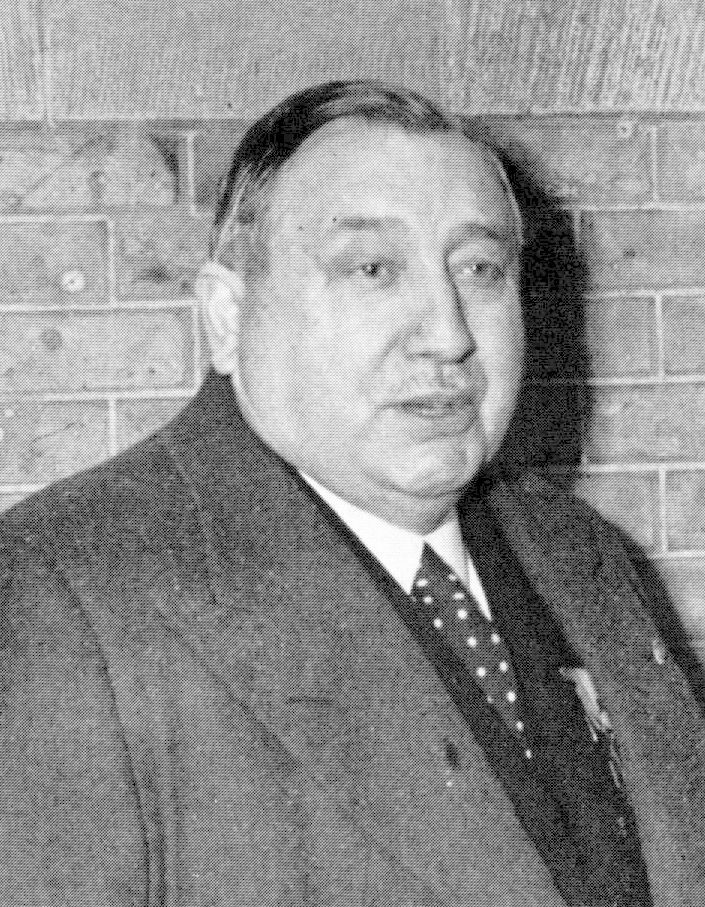
Portrait of Raoul Nordling

Raoul Nordling (French: [ʁaul nɔʁdliŋ], Swedish: [ˈrɑ̌ːʊl ˈnûːɖlɪŋ]; 11 November 1882 – 1 October 1962) was a Swedish-French businessman and diplomat. He was born in Paris and spent most of his life there.

== Biography ==
Nordling's father, Carl Gustav Nordling, arrived in Paris from Sweden at the end of the 1870s, and established the paper-paste firm "Gustav Nordling". Born in Paris, Raoul studied at the Lycée Janson-de-Sailly, and then joined his father's company, eventually succeeding him at its helm. He was appointed as Swedish vice-consul in Paris in 1905 at the age of 24, becoming consul in 1917 and consul-general in 1926, on the death of his father.

Although Nordling was Swedish by nationality, he felt himself to be above all a "citizen of Paris". He spoke French much more often than Swedish, having to virtually learn his national language when he went to Sweden as a young man to complete his military service.

Throughout his working life, Nordling played an important role in mediating between Sweden and France, but he is best remembered for his efforts to mediate between French and German forces during the occupation and Liberation of Paris during the Second World War. He played an important role in ensuring Red Cross access to prisoners of war, and during the uprising of the French resistance in August 1944 he negotiated with the German commander General Dietrich von Choltitz, to try to limit the bloodshed and damage to the city. Many accounts of these events attribute him a major role in doing so, and he was honoured by France after the Liberation with the highest available medal, the Croix de Guerre avec palme in 1949. A play area in the 11th Arrondissement, the "Square Raoul Nordling" is named in his honour, as is a street in Neuilly. He was named honorary citizen of the city of Paris in 1958 and the Grand Cross of the Legion of Honour in 1962.

He continued to play an active role in Parisian social life after the end of the war. He lived in a house called "Le Mas du Gay Savoir" in Sainte-Maxime, which made him an honorary citizen. During the late 1940s, he intervened with the Danish and French security services to secure more lenient treatment for the writer Louis-Ferdinand Céline, who had been imprisoned in Denmark while the French authorities sought his extradition because his openly expressed antisemitism led to charges of collaboration with the occupying Germans and the Vichy régime during the war.

== In popular culture ==
Nordling is played by Orson Welles in the film Is Paris Burning? (1966), by André Dussollier in the film Diplomacy (2014), and by Alexandre Willaume in the TV series The New Look (2024).
