= Boris Godunov discography =

The following list contains all major audio and video recordings of Modest Mussorgsky's opera Boris Godunov.

== Recordings ==
=== 1869 version ===
Year	Cast (Boris, Pretender, Pimen Varlaam, Shuisky, Missail, Fyodor, Xenia, Simpleton)	Conductor, Opera house and orchestra	Label	Notes
1986	Aage Haugland; Stig Fogh Andersen; Aage Haugland; Aage Haugland; Heinz Zednik; Erik Harbo; Annemarie Moller; Susse Lillesoe	Dmitri Kitajenko; Danish Radio Symphony Orchestra and chorus	CD: Kontrapunkt; Cat: 32036-32037	Aage Haugland performed the three bass roles of Boris, Pimen and Varlaam
1997	Nikolai Putilin; Viktor Lutsyuk; Nikolay Okhotnikov; Fyodor Kuznetsov; Konstantin Pluzhnikov; Nikolai Gassiev; Zlata Bulycheva; Olga Trifonva; Yevgeny Akimov	Valery Gergiev; Mariinsky Theatre orchestra and chorus	CD: Philips; Cat: 462 230-2	
2004	Matti Salminen; Pär Lindskog; Eric Halfvarson; Anatoly Kotcherga; Philip Langridge; José Manuel Zapata; Brian Asawa; Marie Arnet; Francisco Vas	Sebastian Weigle; Gran Teatre del Liceu orchestra and chorus	DVD: Cat:	The role of Fyodor was performed by a countertenor rather than a mezzo-soprano
2010	Orlin Anastassov; Ian Storey; Vladimir Vaneev; Vladimir Matorin; Peter Bronder; Luca Casalin; Pavel Zubov; Alessandra Marianelli; Evgeny Akimov	Gianandrea Noseda; Chorus and Orchestra of the Teatro Regio, Turin (Stage director: Andrei Konchalovsky)	Blu-ray: Opus Arte	2007 Michael Rot edition; the production reverses the order of the last two scenes and adds a reprise of the Simpleton’s Lament at the end
2019	Alexander Tsymbalyuk; Sergei Skorokhodov; Mika Kares; Alexey Tikhomirov; Maxim Paster; Boris Stepanov; Johanna Rudström; Hanna Husáhr; Boris Stepanov	Kent Nagano; Gothenburg Symphony Orchestra and chorus	CD: BIS Records Cat: BIS-2320 SACD	Boris Stepanov performed the three tenor roles of Missail, the Simpleton, and the Boyar.

=== 1872 version ===
Year	Cast (Boris, Pretender, Marina, Pimen, Varlaam, Shuisky, Missail, Rangoni, Fyodor, Xenia, Simpleton)	Conductor, Opera house and orchestra	Label	Notes
1943	Alexander Kipnis; René Maison; Kerstin Thorborg; Nicola Moscona; Norman Cordon; Alessio De Paolis; John Dudley; Leonard Warren; Irra Petina; Marita Farell; John Garris	George Szell; Metropolitan Opera orchestra and chorus	CD: Music and Arts; Cat: 867	Highlights, sung in Italian with the exception of Kipnis
1945	Alexander Kipnis; Ilya Tamarin; Anna Leskaya Sr	Nicolai Berezovsky; RCA Victor Symphony Orchestra and chorus	CD: RCA Victor Gold Seal; Cat: GD60522 (1991)	excerpts
1946	Ezio Pinza; Richard Tucker; Risë Stevens; Nicola Moscona; Salvatore Baccaloni; Alessio de Paolis; Lodovico Olivera; Francesco Valentino; Irene Jordan; Frances Greer; Anthony Marlowe	Emil Cooper; Metropolitan Opera orchestra and chorus	CD: Great Opera Performances; Cat: G.O.P. 809	Performed in Italian
1948	André Pernet; Francis Armel; Renée Gilly; Jean Claverie; Ernest Mestrallet; René Bonneval; René Hérnet; Julien Giovannetti; Nadine Wolf; Julianna Farkas; Hugues Cuénod	Ernest Ansermet; Orchestre de la Suisse Romande and chorus	CD: Malibran Music; Cat: CDRG 179	Performed in French
1948	Mark Reizen; Georgy Nelepp; Maria Maksakova Sr.	Nicolai Golovanov; Bolshoi Theatre orchestra and chorus	CD: Aquarius; Cat: AQVR 1772	
1949	Alexander Pirogov; Georgy Nelepp; Maria Maksakova Sr. Maxim Mikhailov; Vassily Lubenchov; Nikander Khanayev; Vassili Yakuschenko; Aleksey Petrovich Ivanov; Bronislava Zlatogorova; Yelena Dimitrievna Kruglikova; Ivan Kozlovsky	Nicolai Golovanov; Bolshoi Theatre orchestra and chorus	CD: Opera d'Oro; Cat: OPD 1363	
1950	Alexander Welitsch; Rudolf Schock; Martha Mödl; Georg Hann; Gustav Neidlinger; Peter Markwort - Hans Herbert Fiedler; Anneliese Rothenberger; Margot Guillaume	Wilhelm Schüchter; Orchester des Nordwestdeutschen Rundfunks and Chorus	CD: Walhall; Cat: WLCD0200	Performed in German
1952	Boris Christoff; Nicolai Gedda; Eugenia Zareska; Boris Christoff; Boris Christoff; Andre Bielecki; Andre Bielecki; Kim Borg; Eugenia Zareska; Ludmilla Lebedeva; Wassili Pasternak	Issay Dobrowen; Orchestre National de la Radiodiffusion Française	CD: Brilliant Classics «Opera Collection» Cat: 93926	Christoff performed the three bass roles of Boris, Pimen and Varlaam. Andre Bielecki performed the tenor roles of Shuisky and Missail.
1954	Miroslav Čangalović; Miroslav Brajnik; Melanija Bugarinović; Branko Pivnichki; Zarko Cvejic; Stephan Andrashevich; Stepan Vukashevich - Sofiya Jankovic; Zlata Sesardich; Nicola Janchich	Krešimir Baranović; Belgrade National Theatre orchestra and chorus	CD: Decca; Cat:	
1956	Alexander Pirogov; Georgy Nelepp; Larisa Avdeyeva	Vassili Nebolsin; Bolshoi Theatre orchestra and chorus	DVD: Video Artists International; Cat: VAI 4253	
1957	Hans Hotter; Hans Hopf; Martha Mödl; Kim Borg; Kurt Böhme; Lorenz Fehenberger; Karl Ostertag; Benno Kusche; Dorothea Siebert; Lotte Schädle; Paul Kuen	Eugen Jochum; Bavarian Radio Symphony Orchestra and Chorus	CD: Myto; Cat: 953.131	Performed in German
1958	Boris Christoff; Joseph Gostik; Regina Resnik; Joseph Rouleau; David Kelly; John Lanigan; David Tree; Otakar Kraus; Josephine Veasey; Joan Carlyle; Duncan Robertson	Rafael Kubelik; Orchestra and Chorus of the Royal Opera House	CD: Myto; Cat: MCD00312	
1961	Boris Christoff; Edgar Evans; Margreta Elkins; Joseph Rouleau; Michael Langdon; John Lanigan - Josephine Veasey; Jeannette Sinclair; Robert Bowman	Reginald Goodall; The Royal Opera orchestra and chorus		
1962	Boris Christoff; Dimiter Uzunov; Evelyn Lear; Boris Christoff; Boris Christoff; John Lanigan; Milen Paunov; Anton Diakov; Ana Alexieva; Ekterina Georgieva; Kiril Dulgerov	Andre Cluytens; Orchestre de la Societe des Concerts du Conservatoire	CD: EMI Classics; Cat: 5 67877-2	Christoff performed the three bass roles of Boris, Pimen and Varlaam.
1962	Ivan Petrov; Vladimir Ivanovsky; Irina Arkhipova; Mark Reshetin; Alexey Geleva; Georgi Shulpin; Nikolai Zakharov; Yevgeny Kibkalo; Valentina Klepatskaya; Tamara Sorokina; Anton Grigoriev	Alexander Melik-Pashaev; Bolshoi Theatre orchestra and chorus	CD: Melodiya; Cat: MEL CD 10 00764	
1963	George London; Vladimir Ivanovsky; Irina Arkhipova; Mark Reshetin; Alexei Gueleva; Georgi Shulpin; Nikolai Zakharov; Yevgeny Kibkalo; Maria Mitokova; Elisabeta Shumskaya; Anton Grigoriev	Alexander Melik-Pashaev; Bolshoi Theatre orchestra and chorus	CD: Sony Classical; Cat: SM3K 52571	
1970	Nicolai Ghiaurov; Ludovic Spiess; Galina Vishnevskaya; Martti Talvela; Anton Diakov; Alexei Maslennikov; Milen Paunov; Zoltan Keleman; Olivera Miljakovic; Nadejda Dobrianova; Alexei Maslennikov	Herbert von Karajan; Vienna Philharmonic orchestra and chorus	CD: Decca; Cat: 000747902	
1972	Nicolai Ghiaurov; Ludovic Spiess; Ruza Baldani; Mark Reshetin; Alexander Vedernikov; Ljubomir Bodurov; Florindo Andreolli; Anton Diakov; Elena Zilio; Rita Talarcio; Anton Grigoriev	Boris Khaikin; RAI Roma	CD: Gala; Cat: GL 100626	
1973	Nicola Ghiuselev; Dimiter Damiano; Alexandrina Milcheva; Nicola Ghiuselev; Assem Tchavdarov; Ljubomir Bodurov; Verter Vrachovski; Peter Bakardzhiev; Reni Penkova; Nadejda Dobrianova; Kiril Dulgerov	Assen Naidenov; Sofia National Opera orchestra and chorus	CD: Fidelio; Cat: D 1824-26	Ghiuselev performed the two bass roles of Boris and Pimen
1976	Martti Talvela; Nicolai Gedda; Bozena Kinasz; Leonard Mróz; Aage Haugland; Bogdan Paprocki; Kazimierz Pustelak; Andrzej Hiolski; Vera Baniewicz; Halina Lukomska; Paulos Raptis	Jerzy Semkow; Polish Radio National Symphony Orchestra; Polish Radio Chorus	CD: EMI Classics; Cat: 5 09178	
1978	Yevgeny Nesterenko; Vladislav Piavko; Irina Arkhipova; Valery Yaroslavtsev; Artur Eisen; Andrei Sokolov; Vitali Vlassov - Glafira Koroleva; Galina Kalinina; Alexei Maslennikov	Boris Khaikin; Bolshoi Theatre orchestra and chorus	DVD: Via Classic; Cat: 5 99278-9	
1983	Aleksandr Vedernikov; Vladislav Piavko; Irina Arkhipova; Vladimir Matorin; Artur Eisen; Andrei Sokolov; Anatoly Mishutin; Yuri Mazurok; Glafira Koroleva; Elena Shkolnikova; Janis Sporgis	Vladimir Fedoseyev; Tchaikovsky Symphony Orchestra and chorus	CD: Philips; Cat: 412 281-2	
1985	Yevgeny Nesterenko; Vladimir Atlantov; Elena Obraztsova; Anatoli Babikin; Artur Eisen; Konstantin Lisovsky; Konstantin Baskov; Yuri Mazurok; Olga Teruchnova; Elena Shkolnikova; Alexei Maslennikov	Mark Ermler; Bolshoi Theatre orchestra and chorus	CD: Regis Records; Cat: RRC 3006	
1986	Nicolai Ghiaurov; Michail Svetlev; Stefka Mineva; Nicola Ghiuselev; Dimiter Petkov; Josef Frank; Dimiter Petkov; Boris Martinovich; Rossitsa Troeva-Mircheva; Liudmila Hadjieva; Mincho Popov	Emil Tchakarov; Sofia National Opera orchestra and chorus	CD: Sony Classical; Cat: S3K 45763	
1987	Yevgeny Nesterenko; Vladislav Piavko; Tamara Sinyavskaya; Alexander Vedernikov; Artur Eisen; Vladimir Kudriashov; Alexander Arkhipov; Tatyana Yerastova; Nina Ledendeva; Alexander Fedin	Alexander Lazarev; Bolshoi Theatre orchestra and chorus	DVD: Cat: 6991811	
1987	Ruggero Raimondi; Vyacheslav Polozov; Galina Vishnevskaya; Paul Plishka; Romauld Tesarowicz; Kenneth Riegel; Misha Raitzin; Nikita Storojew; Matthew Adam Fish; Catherine Dubosc; Nicolai Gedda	Mstislav Rostropovich; National Symphony Orchestra; The Choral Arts Society of Washington	CD: ERATO; Cat: 2292-45418-2	
1990	Robert Lloyd; Alexei Steblianko; Olga Borodina; Alexander Morozov; Vladimir Ognovienko; Evgeni Boitsov; Igor Yan; Sergei Leiferkus; Larissa Diadkova; Olga Kondina; Vladimir Solodovnikov	Valery Gergiev; Mariinsky Theatre orchestra and chorus	DVD: Philips; Cat: 075 089-9	
1993	Anatoly Kocherga; Sergei Larin; Marjana Lipovšek; Samuel Ramey; Gleb Nikolsky; Philip Langridge; Helmut Wildhaber; Sergei Leiferkus; Liliana Nichiteanu; Valentina Valente; Alexander Fedin	Claudio Abbado; Berlin Philharmonic orchestra Slovak Philharmonic chorus Berlin Radio Choir	CD: Sony Classical; Cat: S3K 58977	
1993	Vladimir Vaneev; Vladimir Galusin; Olga Borodina; Nikolay Okhotnikov; Fyodor Kuznetsov; Konstantin Pluzhnikov; Nikolai Gassiev; Evgeny Nikitin; Zlata Bulycheva; Olga Trifonova; Yevgeny Akimov	Valery Gergiev; Mariinsky Theatre orchestra and chorus	CD: Philips; Cat: 462 230-2	
2010	René Pape; Aleksandrs Antonenko; Ekaterina Semenchuk; Mikhail Petrenko; Vladimir Ognovenko; Oleg Balashov; Nikolai Gassiev; Evgeny Nikitin; Jonathan A. Makepeace; Jennifer Zetlan; Andrey Popov	Valery Gergiev; Metropolitan Opera orchestra and chorus (Production: Stephen Wadsworth; directed by Brian Large; performed on 23 October at the Metropolitan Opera House)	HD video: Met Opera on Demand	Critical edition by Michael Rot. Fyodor is sung by a boy treble.
