= Aleko (Rachmaninoff) =

Opera by Sergei Rachmaninoff

- Opera by Sergei Rachmaninoff
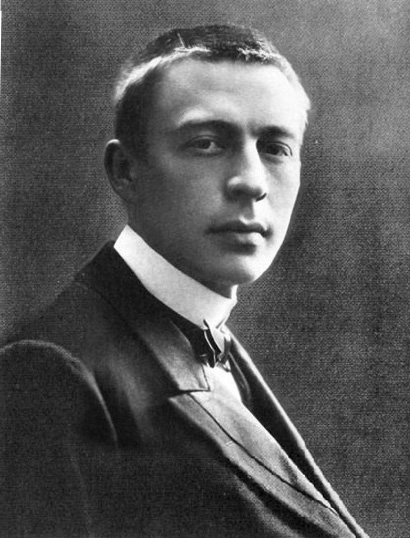
- Rachmaninoff in 1892
- Native title: Russian: Алеко
- Librettist: Vladimir Nemirovich-Danchenko
- Language: Russian
- Based on: The Gypsies by Pushkin
- Premiere: 9 May 1893; Bolshoi Theatre, Moscow

Aleko (Russian: Алеко) is the first of three completed operas by Sergei Rachmaninoff. The Russian libretto was written by Vladimir Nemirovich-Danchenko and is an adaptation of the 1827 poem The Gypsies by Alexander Pushkin. Written in 1892 as a diploma work at the Moscow Conservatory, it won the highest prizes from the conservatory judges that year and was premiered in Moscow on 9 May 1893.

== Performance history ==
The Bolshoi Theatre's premiere took place on 9 May (O.S. 27 April) 1893 in Moscow.

The composer conducted another performance in Kiev on 18/30 October 1893. (Tchaikovsky had attended the Moscow premiere of Aleko, and Rachmaninoff had intended to hear the premiere of Tchaikovsky's Pathétique Symphony on 16/28 October, but had to catch a train for Kiev to fulfill his Aleko conducting engagement.) A Pushkin centenary celebration performance on 27 May 1899 at the Tauride Palace in Saint Petersburg featured Feodor Chaliapin in the title role, and utilized the chorus and ballet of the Mariinsky Theatre.

The opera had its first performance in England on 15 July 1915 at the London Opera House under the direction of Vladimir Rosing.

The New York City Opera's 2016/17 season opened in Jazz at Lincoln Center's Rose Hall with a double bill of Aleko and Pagliacci, an opera that also premiered in May 1892. James Meena conducted and Stefan Szkafarowsky sang the title role. In 2024 Opera North presented Aleko following Cavalleria rusticana in a double-bill with Robert Hayward singing both Alfio and Aleko.

== Roles ==
Role	Voice type	Moscow premiere cast 9 May 1893 (Conductor: Ippolit Al'tani)	Kiev premiere cast 18 October 1893 (Conductor: Rachmaninoff)	St. Petersburg premiere cast 27 May 1899 (Conductor: Rachmaninoff)
Aleko	baritone	Bogomir Korsov	Alexandr Bobrov	Feodor Chaliapin
Young Gypsy	tenor	Lev Klementyev	Alexey Borisenko	Ivan Yershov
Zemfira	soprano	Mariya Deysha-Sionitskaya	Vera Eigen	Mariya Deysha-Sionitskaya
An old man, Zemfira's father	bass	Stepan Vlasov	Levitsky	Yalmar Frey
Gypsy woman	contralto	Yelizaveta Shubina	Alla Tomskaya	
Chorus, silent roles: Gypsies

== Synopsis ==
A band of Gypsies has pitched its tents for the night on the bank of a river. Beneath a pale moon, they light campfires, prepare a meal and sing of the freedom of their nomadic existence. An old Gypsy tells a story. Long ago, he loved Mariula who deserted him for another man, leaving behind Zemfira, their daughter. Zemfira is now grown up, has her own child, and lives with Aleko, a Russian who has abandoned civilisation for the Gypsy life. Hearing this story, Aleko is outraged that Zemfira's father took no revenge on Mariula. But Zemfira disagrees. For her, as for her mother, love is free, and she herself has already tired of Aleko's possessiveness and now loves a younger Gypsy, one of her own people. After dances for the women and the men, the Gypsies settle down to sleep. Zemfira appears with her young lover, whom she kisses passionately before disappearing into her own tent to look after her child. Aleko enters and Zemfira taunts him, singing about her wild lover. Alone, Aleko broods on the catastrophe of his relationship with Zemfira and the failure of his attempt to flee the ordinary world. As dawn comes, he surprises Zemfira and her lover together. In a torment of jealousy he kills them both. All the Gypsies gather, disturbed by the noise. Led by Zemfira's father, they spare Aleko's life but cast him out from them forever.

== Principal arias and numbers ==
- Aleko's Cavatina / Каватина Алеко (Kavatina Aleko)
- The Young Gypsy's Romance / Романс Молодого Цыгана (Romans Molodogo Tsygana)
- The Old Gypsy's Story / Рассказ Старика (Rasskaz Starika)
- Men's Dance / Пляска мужчин (Plyaska muzhchin)
- Zemfira's Song / Песня Земфиры (Pesnya Zemfiry)

== Critical reception ==
Like Rachmaninov's two other operas, Aleko shows Rachmaninov finding his own individual style, independent of the traditional number opera or Wagner's music-dramas. Michael Bukinik, a contemporary of Rachmaninov at the conservatory, recalled the rehearsals for the opera:

I was a pupil of the orchestra class, and during the rehearsals, we not only admired, but were made happy and proud by his daring harmonies, and were ready to see in him a reformer.

Geoffrey Norris has noted criticism of the opera as lacking in dramatic momentum and the libretto as being a hastily crafted "hotchpotch". A contemporary critic in the Moskovskiye vedomosti wrote of the opera at the time of the premiere:

Of course there are faults, but they are far outweighed by merits, which lead one to expect much from this young composer in the future.

== Recordings ==
- 1951 Ivan Ivanovich Petrov, Nina Pokrovskaya, Anatoly Orfenov, Alexander Ognivtzev, Bronislava Zlatogorova; Bolshoi Theatre Chorus and Orchestra; Nikolai Golovanov; studio recording; Melodiya
- 1987 Evgeny Nesterenko, Svetlana Volkova, Alexander Fedin, Vladimir Matorin, Raisa Kotova; USSR TV & Radio Large Chorus, Moscow Philharmonic Symphony Orchestra; Dmitri Kitaenko; Melodiya
- 1990 Arthur Eisen, Lyudmila Sergienko, Gegham Grigoryan, Gleb Nikolsky, Anna Volkova, Vasily Lanovoy; USSR Academic Grand Chorus of Radio & TV, USSR Academic Symphony Orchestra; Yevgeny Svetlanov, Melodiya
- 1993 Nicola Ghiuselev, Blagovesta Karnabatlova, Pavel Kourchoumov, Dimiter Petkov, Tony Christova; Bulgarian Broadcasting Chorus, Plovdiv Philharmonic Orchestra; Rouslan Raichev; Monitor - Balkanton
- 1993 Vladimir Matorin, Natalia Erassova, Viatcheslav Potchapski, Vitaly Tarastchenko, Galina Borissova; Russian State Choir, Bolshoi Theatre Orchestra; Andrei Chistiakov, Chant du Monde
- 1995 Samson Isoumov, Marina Lapina, Oleg Koulko, Leonid Tischenko; Aleko Choir, Donetsk Philharmonic Orchestra; Roman Kofman (live, Rotterdam); Verdi Records / Brilliant
- 1996 Vladimir Urbanovich, Olga Babkina, Igor Borisov, Vitaly Yefanov, Tatiana Gorbunova; Novosibirsk State Opera Chorus and Orchestra; Alexei Ludmilin; Arte Nova
- 1996 Sergei Leiferkus, Maria Guleghina, Ilya Levinsky, Anatoli Kotscherga, Anne Sofie von Otter; Gothenburg Opera Chorus, Gothenburg Symphony Orchestra; Neeme Järvi, Deutsche Grammophon
- 2000 Vasily Gerello, Olga Guryakova, Vsevolod Grivnov, Mikhail Kit, Elena Manikhina; Yurlov Capella, Moscow Chamber Orchestra; Constantine Orbelian, Delos
- 2005 (excerpts) Alexander Tekeliev, Mariana Zvetkova, Boiko Tsvetanov, Peter Naydenov, Andreana Nikolova; Sofia National Opera Chorus and Orchestra; Nayden Todorov; studio recording (excerpts); Naxos 8.557817
- 2006 Viacheslav Potchapski, Maria Gavrilova, Andrey Dunayev, Egils Silins, Alexandra Durseneva; Choeurs de Radio France, Orchestre Philharmonique de Radio France; Vladimir Fedoseyev; live in concert at the Salle Pleyel, Paris; Premiere Opera
- 2009 Sergey Murzaev, Svetla Vassileva, Evgeny Akimov, Gennady Bezzubenkov, Nadezhda Vasilieva; Coro del Teatro Regio di Torino, BBC Philharmonic; Gianandrea Noseda, Chandos
- 2019 Sergei Leiferkus, Vsevolod Grivnov, Andrei Baturkin, Maxim Paster, Mikhail Golovushkin; Choral Ensemble of Soloists "Tebe Poem", Siberian State Symphony Orchestra; Vladimir Lande; live video recording from the Dmitri Hvorostovsky Festival, Krasnoyarsk; medici.tv
- 2024 Vladislav Sulimsky, Kristina Mkhitaryan, Andrei Danilov, Shavleg Armasi, Natalya Boeva; Chor des Bayerischen Rundfunks, Munich Radio Orchestra; Ivan Repušić; live in concert at the Prinzregententheater, Munich; broadcast on BR-Klassik

Notable excerpts

- 1929 Feodor Chaliapin: Aleko's Cavatina. Available on LP, CD, online. Electrical (microphone) recording. A 1924 acoustical (horn) recording also exists.

Video

- 1986 Evgeny Nesterenko (Aleko), Nelli Volshaninova/Svetlana Volkova (Zemfira), Sandor Semenov/Mikhail Muntyan (Young Gypsy), Vladimir Golovin/Vladimir Matorin (Old Gypsy), Maria Papazian/Raisa Kotova (Old Gypsy Woman); Gosteleradio Chorus, Moscow State Symphony Orchestra; Dmitri Kitaenko, VAI
- 2016 Kostas Smoriginas (Aleko), Anna Nechaeva (Zemfira), Sergey Semishkur (Young Gypsy), Alexander Vassiliev (Old Gypsy), Yaroslava Kozina (Gypsy Woman); Orchestre symphonique et Choeurs de la Monnaie; Mikhail Tatarnikov, Bel Air Classiques

== Books ==
- Rachmaninoff, Sergei; von Riesemann, Oskar (1970) [1934]. Rachmaninoff's Recollections, Told to Oskar Von Riesemann. Freeport, New York: Books for Libraries Press. ISBN 978-0-8369-5232-2.
- Martyn, Barrie (1990). Rachmaninoff: Composer, Pianist, Conductor. Aldershot: Scolar Press. ISBN 978-0-859-67809-4.
- Harrison, Max (2006). Rachmaninoff: Life, Works, Recordings. London: Bloomsbury Publishing. ISBN 978-0-826-49312-5.
- Ito, Yuki (2023). Insights on Rachmaninoff -from the Cellist’s perspective- (in Japanese). Tokyo: Keigado Publishing. ISBN 978-4-87430-052-7.
