= Baltic State Opera =

Opera company in Gdańsk, Poland

Coordinates: 54.3726°N 18.6254°E

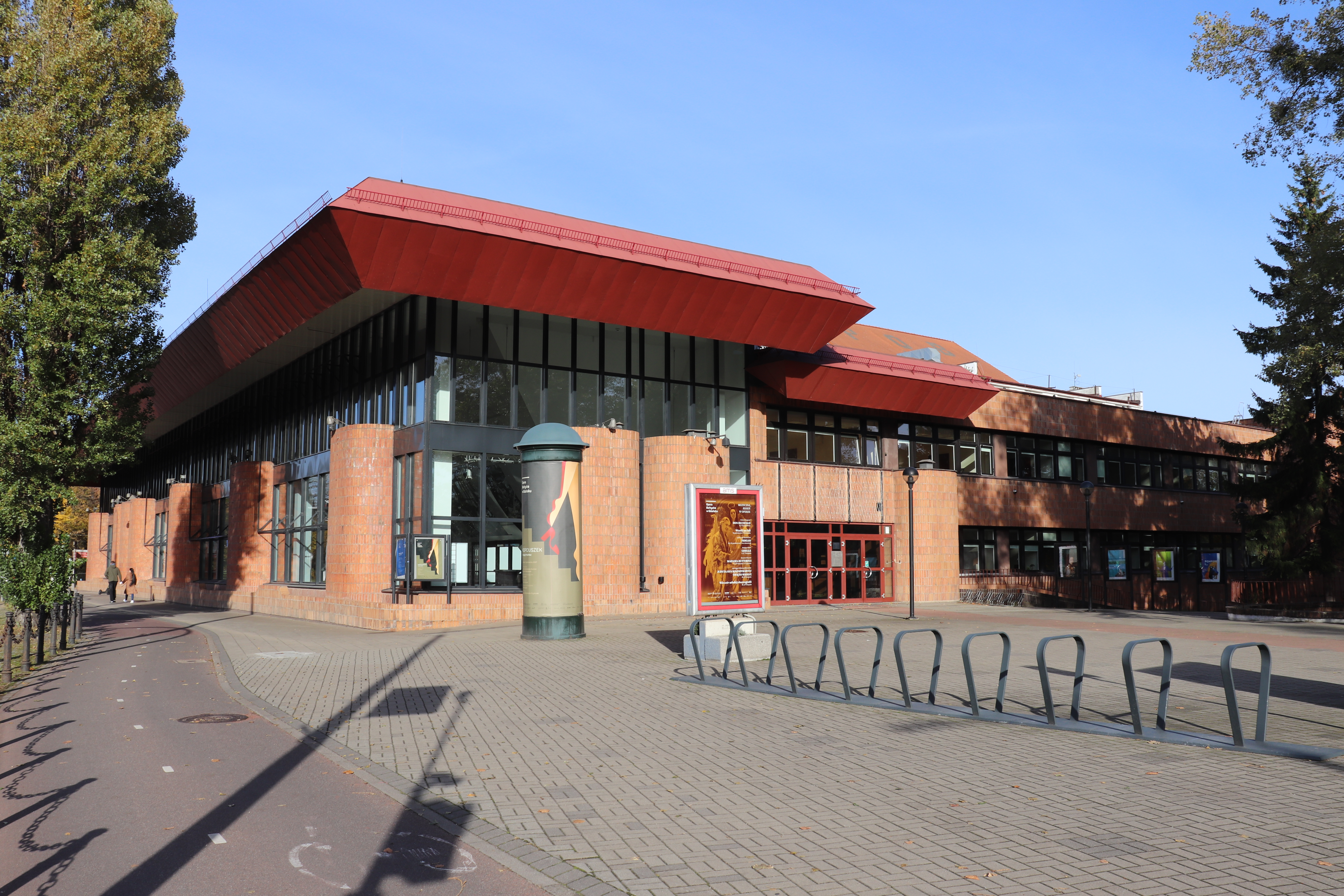
Baltic State Opera

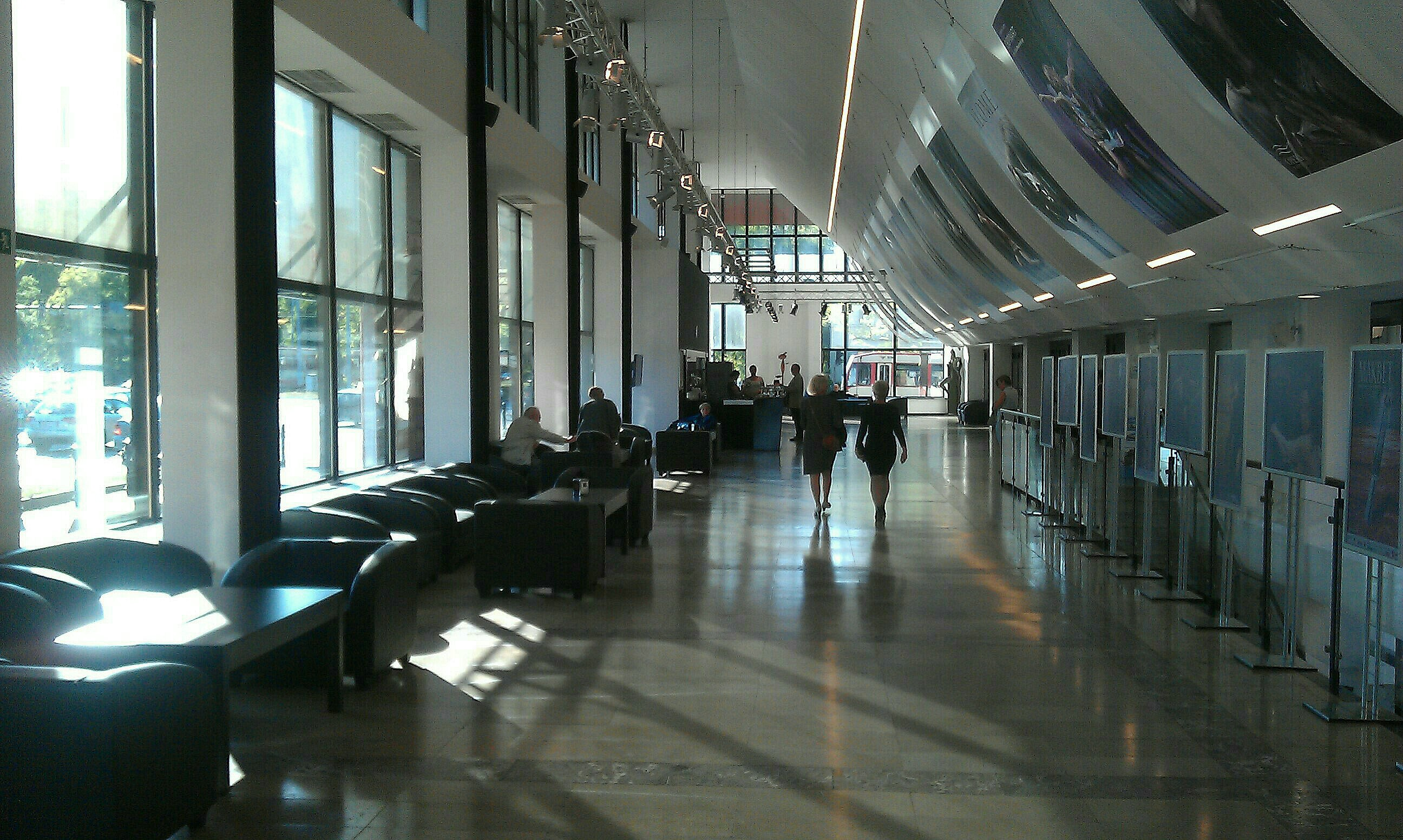
Foyer

Baltic Opera (formerly Baltic State Opera) is an opera company located in Gdańsk, Poland.

== History ==
It began in February 1949 as the Music and Drama Studio (in Polish: Studio Muzyczno-Dramatyczne) set up by Iwo Gall. In autumn 1949, the Opera Studio (in Polish: Studio Operowe) of the Baltic Philharmonic was founded. In 1953, they were united under the name of Baltic State Opera and Philharmonic. In 1993, after the institution had been divided, the Baltic Opera emerged.

In 2008, Marek Weiss became the director and steered the institution in a new direction. Such ambitious operas as Britten's Rape of Lucretia or Richard Strauss' Ariadne auf Naxos directed by Weiss appeared in its repertoire.

As an effect of the changes introduced by the company, in 2010 the BBC named the Baltic Opera (as the first opera theatre in Poland) one of ten best opera theatres in Europe; among the others were the Royal Opera House, Covent Garden, the Liceu in Barcelona, La Monnaie in Brussels and the Netherlands Opera in Amsterdam.

Contrary to most theatres in this part of Europe, the Baltic Opera presents its productions not in the repertory system, but using the stagione system. Annually the Baltic Opera present around 120 opera, dance theatre and concert performances. The best producers prepare from five to six premieres a year. Each season includes such classics as the major operas by Mozart, Tchaikovsky, Verdi, and Bizet as well as more unusual repertoire.

The company takes part in international cultural projects on a regular basis. It has twice participated in the International Opera Festival and Competition under the aegis of the Mezzo TV. In the 2011/2012 season, it organized the first edition of the Baltic Dance Theatres’ Encounters (in September 2011) and prepared the world premiere of Elżbieta Sikora’s opera Madame Curie. This work was commissioned by the Baltic Opera, although its first performance took place in Paris in November 2011, within the framework of the Cultural Programme of the Polish Presidency of the EU Council. Madame Curie was also the first production in the Opera Gedanensis series, a project which is being realised by the Baltic Opera.

=== Polish premieres ===
Outside of the major operatic repertoire, Polish premieres which took place in the Baltic Opera include:

- Cherevichki by Tchaikovsky (1952)
- Peter Grimes by Benjamin Britten (1958)
- The Miraculous Mandarin by Béla Bartók (1960)
- Rita by Donizetti (1961)
- The Rake's Progress by Igor Stravinsky (1965)
- Iolanta by Tchaikovsky (1977)
- The Little Humpbacked Horse, ballet by Rodion Shchedrin (1978)
- Luisa Miller by Verdi (concert version, 2001)
- I Lombardi alla prima crociata by Verdi (concert version, 2004)
- Anna Bolena by Donizetti (2004)
- I masnadieri by Verdi (concert version, 2005)
- Madame Curie by Sikora (2011)
- Rothschild's Violin by Veniamin Fleishman (2013)
- The Gamblers by Shostakovich (unfinished) and Polish composer Krzysztof Meyer (2013)

== See also ==
- List of opera houses
