= Aleksandr Naumenko (singer) =

Russian composer

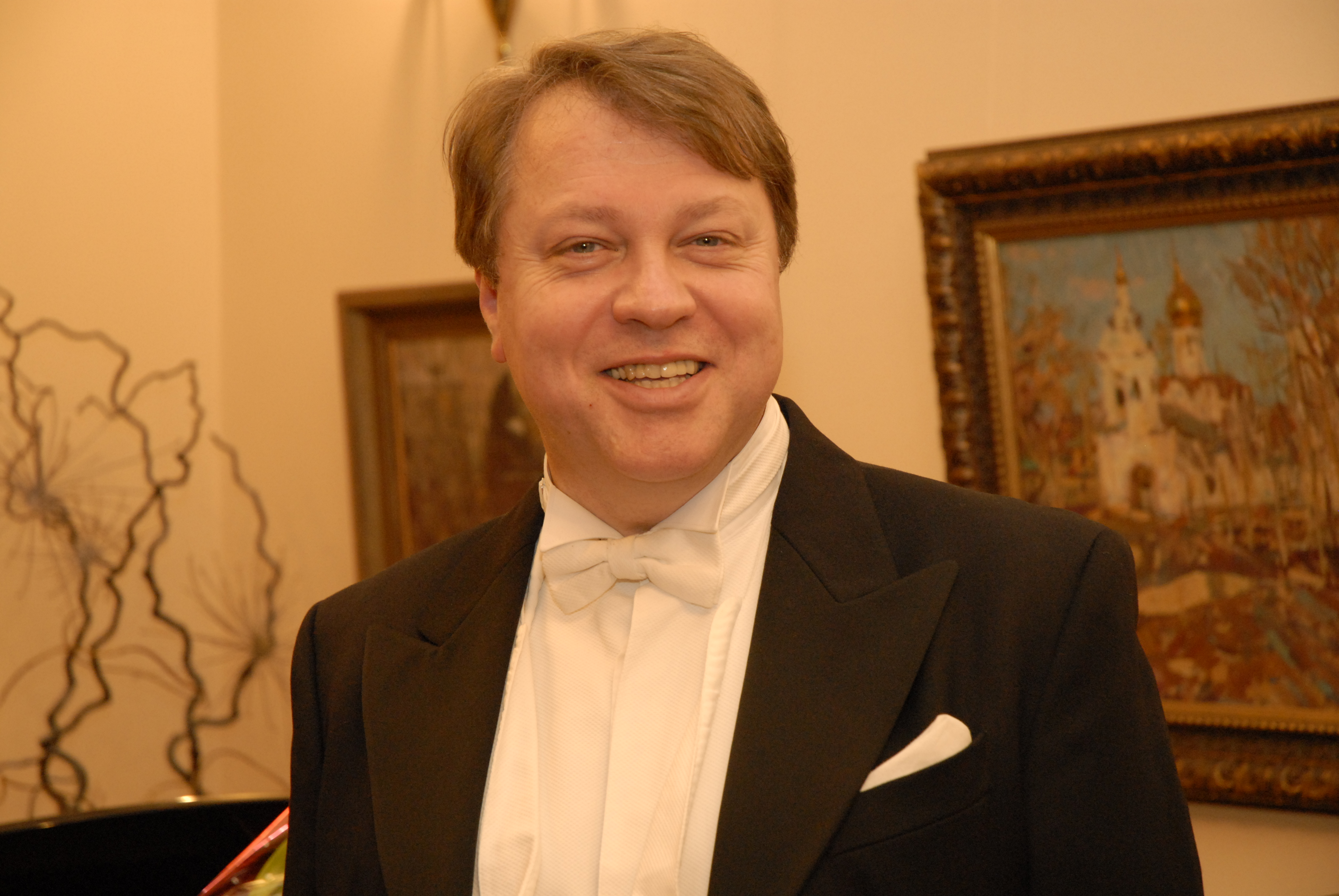
Alexandre Naoumenko at a concert in London

Alexandre Grigoryevich Naoumenko (Russian: Александр Григорьевич Науменко) is a Russian operatic tenor, vocal coach and composer.

== Life and career ==
Naoumenko was born in Lipetsk, Russia. After graduating from the Lipetsk College of Music, he studied at the Moscow Tchaikovsky Conservatory under prolific Georgian tenor Zurab Sotkilava, later continuing his training at the Moscow Opera Studio. He attended master classes with Alfredo Kraus, Renata Scotto, Renato Capecchi, Ernst Haefliger, Nancy Evans and Aldo Baldin.

While in Moscow, Naoumenko sang the roles of Podholusin (The Marriage) for the Bolshoi Theatre, Alfredo (La Traviata), Lensky (Eugene Onegin) and Don Giovanni (The Stone Guest), at the Moscow Conservatory Bolshoi Hall. In 1991 he gave his American debut at San Francisco's War Memorial Opera House in the role of Platon Karataev (War and Peace) conducted by Valery Gergiev. After moving to the UK, he sang with English National Opera in roles such as Dr Caius (Falstaff) under Mark Elder and Ladislav (The Two Widows).

Naoumenko then worked extensively throughout Europe, singing roles including Cavaradossi (Tosca) with European Chamber Opera, Fenton (Falstaff) with English Touring Opera, Don Jose (Carmen) at the Chelmsford Festival, Misail (Boris Godunov) with Opera Ireland conducted by Alexander Anisimov, Mylio (Lalo's Le Roi d’Ys) with University College Opera, Flute (A Midsummer Night's Dream) and Doctor Caius (Falstaff) for the Aldeburgh Festival, conducted by Steuart Bedford. In Germany he performed the role of Mozart (Mozart and Salieri). He sang Platon Karataev (War and Peace) and The Italian Prisoner in Strauss's Friedenstag at the Concertgebouw in Amsterdam under Edo de Waart, also broadcast for Dutch Radio. After making numerous concert and oratorio appearances in Moscow such as Das Lied von der Erde with the Kremlin Orchestra, Mozart's Requiem conducted by Yuri Simonov and Les Noces conducted by Gennady Rozhdestvensky at Moscow's Tchaikovsky Concert Hall, he continued this abroad. Naoumenko sang Verdi's Requiem under David Willcocks at the Royal Albert Hall as well as Beethoven's Missa Solemnis and Bach's Christmas Oratorio in Stuttgart under Helmuth Rilling. Other parts include Mydas in Bach's Phoebus and Pan and Tchaikovsky's Ode to Joy.

Naoumenko's recordings include the role of Moisei Shahkes in Rothschild's Violin (Fleishman/Shostakovich) conducted by Gennady Rozhdestvensky, recorded for Melodiya Records. He has worked with Chandos Records to record Complete Songs of Rachmaninov with Howard Shelley, Joan Rodgers, Maria Popescu and Sergei Leiferkus.

== Other work ==
Naoumenko works as Russian coach at the Royal Opera House, having previously taught at the Moscow Conservatory.

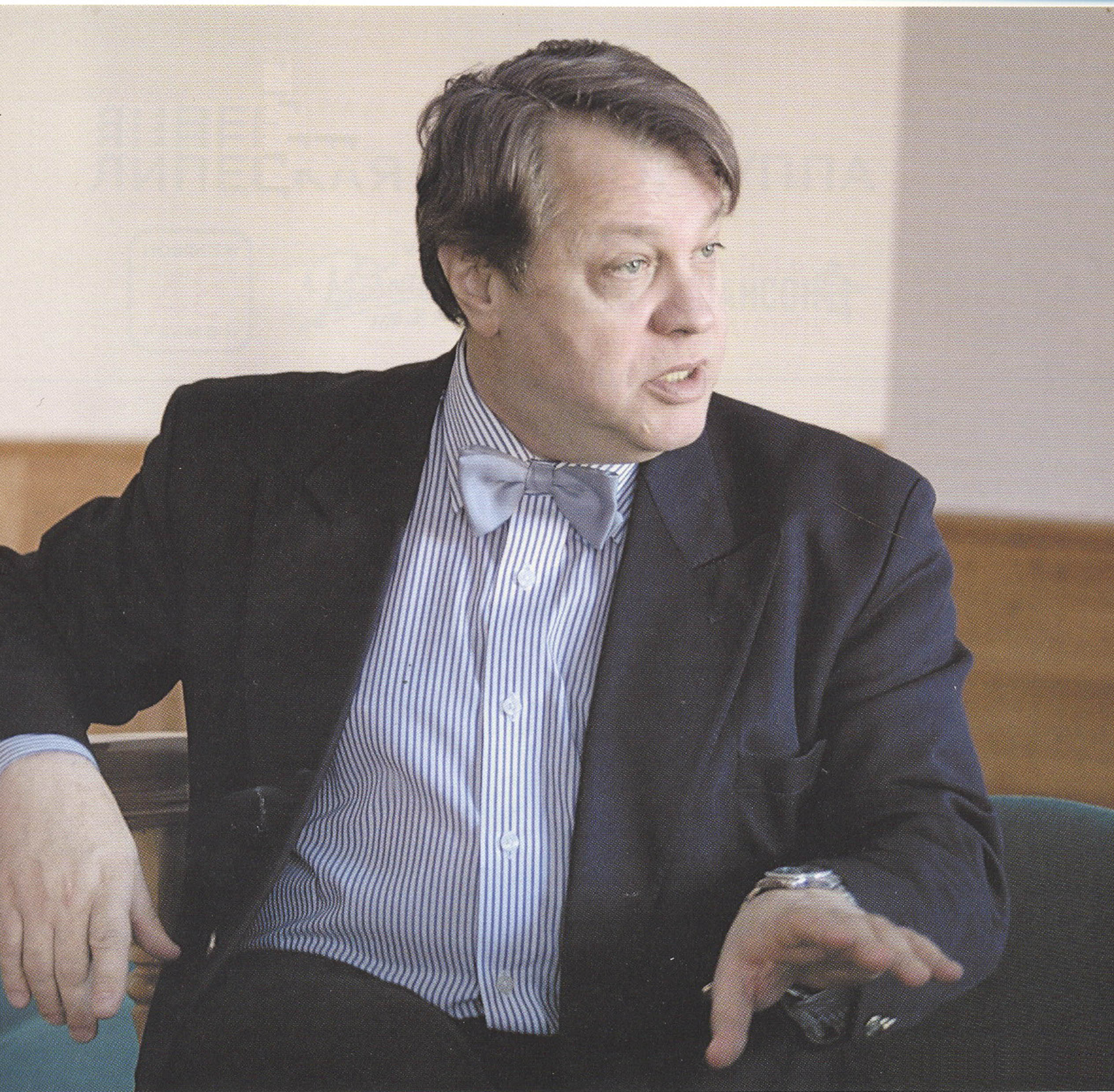
Alexandre Naoumenko Masterclass

He also works with leading orchestras, choirs and music foundations throughout Britain and Russia, including the London Symphony Chorus, London Philharmonic Orchestra, CBSO Chorus and Jackdaws Music Education Trust. He recently worked alongside Valery Gergiev in the UK premiere of The Brothers Karamazov at the Barbican Hall. Alongside his stage career, Naoumenko continues a busy schedule as a vocal coach and composer.
