= Rothschild's Violin (opera) =

1944 opera by Veniamin Fleishman and Dmitri Shostakovich

Rothschild's Violin (Russian: Скрипка Ротшильда) is a one-act opera by Russian composer Veniamin Fleishman (1913–1941) set to the Russian libretto by the composer after the short story "Rothschild's Fiddle" by Anton Chekhov.

The opera centres on the bitter central character, Yakov Ivanov, a coffin-maker and amateur fiddler, his gradual understanding of life and his bequest of his violin to Rothschild, who also plays in the Jewish band with Ivanov and whom he has treated with contempt.

== History of creation ==
Between 1939 and 1941, the young Fleishman was one of Dmitri Shostakovich's most promising students at the Leningrad Conservatory, where he composed his first work, a one-act opera entitled Rothschild's Violin. His mentor had suggested Anton Chekhov's story as the basis for the libretto. Setting his tale in an Eastern Europe shtetl at the end of the 19th century, Fleishman paid a musical homage to a world on the verge of extinction.

During World War II Fleishman joined the civil brigades formed to defend Leningrad and was among the first to be killed in action. Evacuating Leningrad on Stalin's order, Shostakovich managed to salvage Fleishman's unfinished score. In memory of his talented student, Shostakovich completed it and orchestrated it in 1943/1944. Shostakovich dated his completion of the score February 5, 1944. Later, he exerted influence so that the opera should be published and performed.

== First performances ==
- The opera's world premiere concert performance took place on June 20, 1960, at the USSR Union of Composers, Moscow, with the soloists and members of the Moscow Philharmonic Society.
- The first staged performance took place at the Leningrad Conservatory on April 24, 1968, by the Experimental Studio of Chamber Opera. The artistic director was Solomon Volkov, and the conductor Yuri Kochnev.
- The first fully staged British performance took place at the Covent Garden Film Studios, London, on May 3, 2007, by Second Movement Opera.

== Roles ==
- Yakov Matveeyevich Ivanov (nicknamed Bronze), coffin-maker and violinist – bass
- Rothschild, flautist then violinist – tenor
- Moisei Ilyich Shakhes, gravedigger – tenor
- Marfa, Ivanov's Wife, mezzo-soprano
- Members of the orchestra (6 to 8 tenors and basses)

== Scoring ==
Baritone, 2 tenors, mezzo-soprano; male chorus of 6 to 8 voices, 3 flutes, (III = piccolo), 3 oboes (III = cor anglais), 3 clarinets (III = E-flat clarinet/bass clarinet), 3 bassoons (III = contrabassoon), 4 horns, 3 trumpets, 3 trombones, tuba, timpani, 3 percussion (side drum, bass drum, crash cymbals, suspended cymbal, tambourine, glockenspiel, xylophone), 2 harps, strings.

This work is represented by Boosey & Hawkes in the UK, Commonwealth of Nations (excluding Canada), Republic of Ireland, mainland China, Korea and Taiwan; and by Hans Sikorski for Europe.

== Arrangement ==
For chamber ensemble (1.0.1.1 – 0.1.1.0 – piano, strings (1.1.1.1.1) by Gerd Jünemann.

== Synopsis ==
Time and Place: A small town somewhere in Russia

There is a wedding in a merchant's house. A band of local musicians are playing in the street, but a quarrel breaks out between them. The old coffin-maker, Ivanov (known as 'Bronza'), accuses the young Rothschild of spoiling the music. But the others turn against him and eventually, in disgust, Bronza packs his violin and goes home. Alone, Bronza laments his poverty and the lack of respect that others show him. His wife Marfa returns from the river with a bucket of water and collapses from exhaustion. While the remaining musicians go into the merchant's house, Rothschild stays in the street outside, playing his flute. Marta, lying in bed, reminds Bronza of their little fair-haired daughter who died fifty years ago while still a child. Bronza knows he will have to make a coffin for his wife this day. The musicians reappear and strike up a lively dance. They send Rothschild to persuade Bronza to come and join them, but Bronza throws Rothschild out of his house. Children in the street chase after the young musician, shouting: 'Jew! Jew!' In a long monologue, Bronza grieves for the waste of his life, for the destruction of the former woods around the town, and for his own mistreatment of his wife and of Rothschild. Staring at his violin, he hopes that after his death it will 'sing new songs of happiness', for he cannot take it with him to his grave. Rothschild returns once again to implore Bronza to come and join the musicians. Instead the old Russian coffin-maker gives him his violin and the young Jewish man begins to play.

A performance takes about 42 minutes.

== Quotations ==
- "...I love Chekhov, I often reread "Ward Six". I like everything he wrote, including the early stories. And I feel sorry that I didn't as much work on Chekhov as I had wanted to. Of course, my student Benjamin Fleishman wrote an opera based on Chekhov's "Rothschild's Violin". I suggested he do an opera on the subject. Fleishman was a sensitive spirit and he had a fine rapport with Chekhov. But he had a hard life. Fleishman had a tendency to write sad music rather than happy music, and naturally, he was abused for it. Fleishman sketched out the opera but then he volunteered for the army. He was killed. He went into the People's Volunteer Guard. They were all candidates for corpsehood. They were barely trained and poorly armed, and thrown into the most dangerous areas. A soldier could still entertain hopes of survival, but a volunteer guardsman, no. The guard of the Kuibyshev District, which was the one Fleishman joined, perished almost completely. Rest in peace. (Dmitri Shostakovich: Testimony, p. 225)
- "I'm happy that I managed to complete "Rothschild's Violin" and orchestrate it. It's a marvellous opera – sensitive and sad. There are no cheap effects in it; it is wise and very Chekhovian. I'm sorry that our theatres pass over Fleishman's opera. It's certainly not the fault of the music, as far as I can see..." (Ibid.)
- "...I never did learn to live according to Chekhov's main tenet. For Chekhov all people are the same. He presented people and the reader had to decide for himself what was bad and what was good. Chekhov remained unprejudiced. Everything inside me churns when I read "Rothschild's Violin". Who's right, who's wrong? Who made life nothing but steady losses? Everything churns within me." (Ibid.)
- "The opera is a marvel, pure and subtle. Chekhov's bittersweet lyricism is presented in a style that could be described thus: mature Shostakovich." (Solomon Volkov, preface to Testimony, p. xiii)
- On the premiere staging: "It was a stormy and rousing success and with glorious reviews... Then the official administrators of culture accused all of us of Zionism..." (Solomon Volkov, preface to Testimony, p. xiii)
- "Shostakovich did not allocate an Opus number to his orchestration of Rothschild's Violin, as he had done with some of his other orchestrations. Perhaps it will never be possible to define the extent of Shostakovich's insight into the fabric of the music of Fleishman, as Fleishman's manuscript of Rothschild's Violin has not survived. However, it is possible to speak successfully of Fleishman's insight into the fabric of the music of Shostakovich, as from that time Shostakovich had begun to show a special interest in Jewish folklore (upon which Fleishman's opera was based), starting with Shostakovich's second piano trio, Op. 67 (1944), his first violin concerto, Op. 77 (1948) and the cycle From Jewish Folk Poetry, Op. 79 (1948), etc." (Dmitri N. Smirnov, "My Shostakovich", footnote)

== Recordings ==
There are recordings on Avie (2006) and on RCA (1995). The live recording from 2006 on Avie Records (AV 2121) received an Editor's Choice recommendation in Gramophone.

Rothschild's Violin, CD cover, RCA Red Seal 09026 68434-2

Rothschild's Violin with Sergei Leiferkus, Konstantin Pluzhnikov, Ilya Levinsky, Marina Shaguch, Rotterdam Philharmonic Orchestra, Gennady Rozhdestvensky, RCA Red Seal 09026 68434-2

1. Wedding Band
2. What Are You Playing
3. This Small Town Is Worse Than a Village
4. Band Music
5. Do You Remember Iakov Do You Recall
6. God Had Given Us a Little Girl
7. Band Music/Make That Trumpet Merrier
8. Down Here on Earth Everything Flies so Fast
9. Rothschild Runs Away
10. Loss One Coffin for Marfa Ivanova
11. If They Could Live Without Hatred or Evil
12. It's Better to Die
13. Be Kind to Me Don't Hit Me
14. Rothschild Plays the Violin

== Film ==
- Le violon de Rothschild, directed by Edgardo Cozarinsky

The film is about this opera and the dramatic circumstances in which this little-known work was composed. Both a historical work and a piece of operatic fiction, Rothschild's Violin describes a work of art and the context in which was composed. The reconstitution of Fleishman's opera is the core of the film, which Cozarinsky chose to film using post-synchronization so as to leave himself the greatest possible leeway in filming the opera's dramatic and visual elements.

- Director: Edgardo Cozarinsky
- Writer: Edgardo Cozarinsky
- Image: Jacques Bouquin
- Cinematograper and editor: Martine Bouquin
- Music: Fleishmann, Shostakovitch, Budapester Klezmer Band
- Actors: Sergei Makovetski, Dainius Kazlauskas, Miklós Székely, Zoltán Zsoter, Mari Törőcsik, Ferenc Jávori, etc.
- Production: Les Films d'Ici
- 1996 – 35 mm – colour and black-and-white – 110 minutes
