= Raitzin =

Raitzin is a surname. Notable people with the surname include:

- Michelle Raitzin, singer
- Misha Raitzin (1930–1990), Ukrainian operatic tenor
