= Konstantin Pluzhnikov =

Konstantin Pluzhnikov may refer to:

- Konstantin Pluzhnikov (tenor) (born 1941), Russian operatic tenor
- Konstantin Pluzhnikov (gymnast) (born 1987), Russian gymnast
