= Samuel Youn =

South Korean opera singer (born 1971)

- Hangul: 윤태현
- RR: Yun Taehyeon
- MR: Yun T'aehyŏn

Samuel Youn (Korean: 윤태현; born 1971) is a South Korean operatic bass baritone.

== Career ==
Youn was born in Seoul, South Korea.

Samuel Youn studied voice in Seoul, in Milan, and at the Cologne University of Music under Arthur Janzen. He has been a member of the Cologne Opera since the 1999/2000 season. At Cologne he has sung among other roles Kaspar in Der Freischütz, Jochanaan in Richard Strauss' Salome, Escamillo in Bizet's Carmen, and the Wagnerian roles of Donner and Gunther in Der Ring des Nibelungen, Kurwenal in Tristan und Isolde and the Dutchman in Der fliegende Holländer; he has also made many guest appearances in various countries, including as the Wanderer/Wotan in Wagner's Siegfried, his début in the role, in Lisbon, and Mephisto in Gounod's Faust in Treviso and Rovigo, his first appearances in Italy. He has also sung in concert in Brahms' German Requiem, Mahler's Symphony No. 8, and Beethoven's Ninth Symphony among other works.

In 2004 he made his début at the Bayreuth Festival as the second Grail Knight in Parsifal (conducted by Pierre Boulez), and in 2005 he appeared there as Reinmar von Zweter in Tannhäuser (conducted by Christian Thielemann) and in 2010 as the Herald in Lohengrin (conducted by Andris Nelsons).

In 2012 Youn became the first East Asian to sing a title role in a Wagner opera, performing the role of the Dutchman in Der Fliegende Holländer at Bayreuth, as a short-notice replacement for Yevgeny Nikitin, who withdrew days before the opening of the festival because he had a tattoo that was said in German media to resemble a swastika.

In November 2012 Youn was appointed a Musical Ambassador of Singende Krankenhäuser e.V. (Singing Hospitals).

In 2016 Youn sang Scarpia in Puccini's Tosca at the Royal Opera House, Covent Garden, and also performed for the first time in the US, as Alberich in Wagner's Das Rheingold with the Lyric Opera of Chicago, his first performance in the role.

== Honours ==
Youn was the first recipient of the Offenbach Prize of the Freunde der Oper Köln e. V., in 2005.

He has won several international singing competitions, including the Treviso Toti dal Monte, the Seoul Chung-Ang, the Genoa Franz Schubert Contest, and the Naples Francesco Albanese Contest.
