= Veniamin Fleishman =

Russian Jewish opera composer

Veniamin Iosifovich Fleishman, (Russian: Вениами́н Ио́сифович Фле́йшман, 20 July 1913 in Bezhetsk, Tver Governorate – 14 September 1941 in Krasnoye Selo, Leningrad Oblast) was a Soviet composer.

== Rothschild's Violin ==
While studying under Dmitri Shostakovich at the Leningrad Conservatory (1939–1941), he began a one-act opera Rothschild's Violin based on Anton Chekhov's short story of the same name about Bronza, a Russian country coffin-maker and violinist, and his combative relationship with the Jewish musicians in his village.

At the outbreak of World War II, Fleishman volunteered for the front and was killed before he could complete the work. In memory of his talented student, Shostakovich rescued the manuscript from besieged Leningrad, finished it and orchestrated it in 1943–1944. Shostakovich dated his completion of the score 5 February 1944. Later, he exerted influence so that the opera should be published and performed.

The opera's world premiere concert performance took place on 20 June 1960 at the USSR Union of Soviet Composers, Moscow, with the soloists and members of the Moscow Philharmonic Society. The opera was first staged in April 1968, Leningrad, at the Experimental Studio of Chamber Opera. The artistic director was Solomon Volkov, and the conductor Yuri Kochnev.

== Recordings ==
- Veniamin Fleishman: Rothschild's Violin with Sergei Leiferkus, Konstantin Pluzhnikov, Ilya Levinsky, Marina Shaguch, Rotterdam Philharmonic Orchestra, Gennadi Rozhdestvensky, RCA Red Seal 09026 68434-2
