= Yuri Kochnev =

Russian conductor

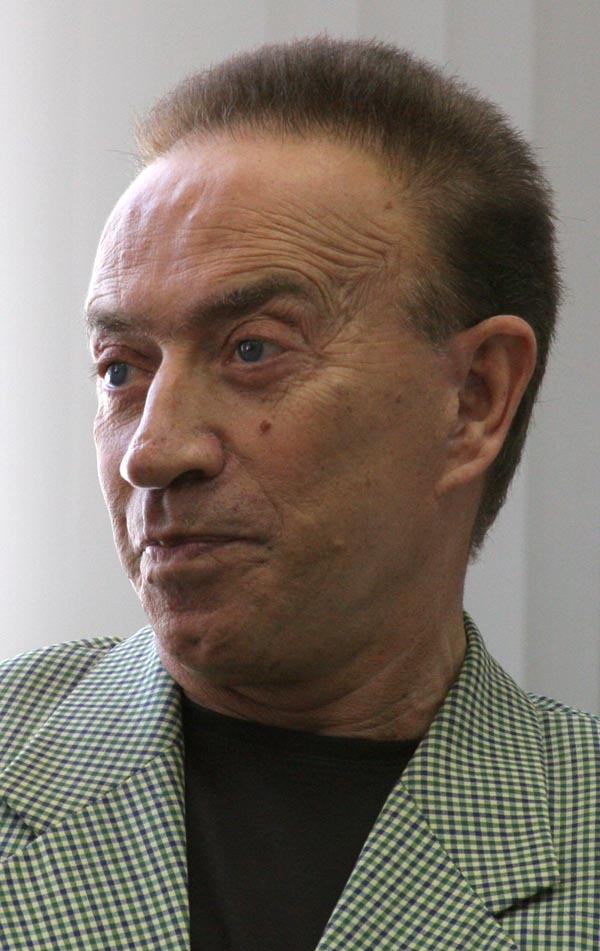
Yuri Kochnev

Yuri Leonidovich Kochnev (Юрий Леонидович Кочнев; born 26 February 1942) is a Russian conductor.

Kochnev was born in Simferopol and from the age of seven grew up in Vologda. At 15 he entered the Children's School of the Leningrad Conservatory to study viola. He graduated from the Leningrad Conservatory in viola (1968), music theory (1970) and conducting (1971).

Since 1975 Yuri Kochnev has been Chief Conductor, and since 1991, artistic director of, Saratov Opera and Ballet, Saratov. He conducted the Russian premieres of The Rise and Fall of Mahogany City by Kurt Weil, The Whirlpool by the Slovak composer Eugen Suchoň, and the world premiere of Margarita (Маргарита) by Vladimir Kobekin. He also introduced Shostakovich's pupil's Benjamin Fleischman's posthumous work Rothschild's Violin to the stage.
