= Opera Pacific =

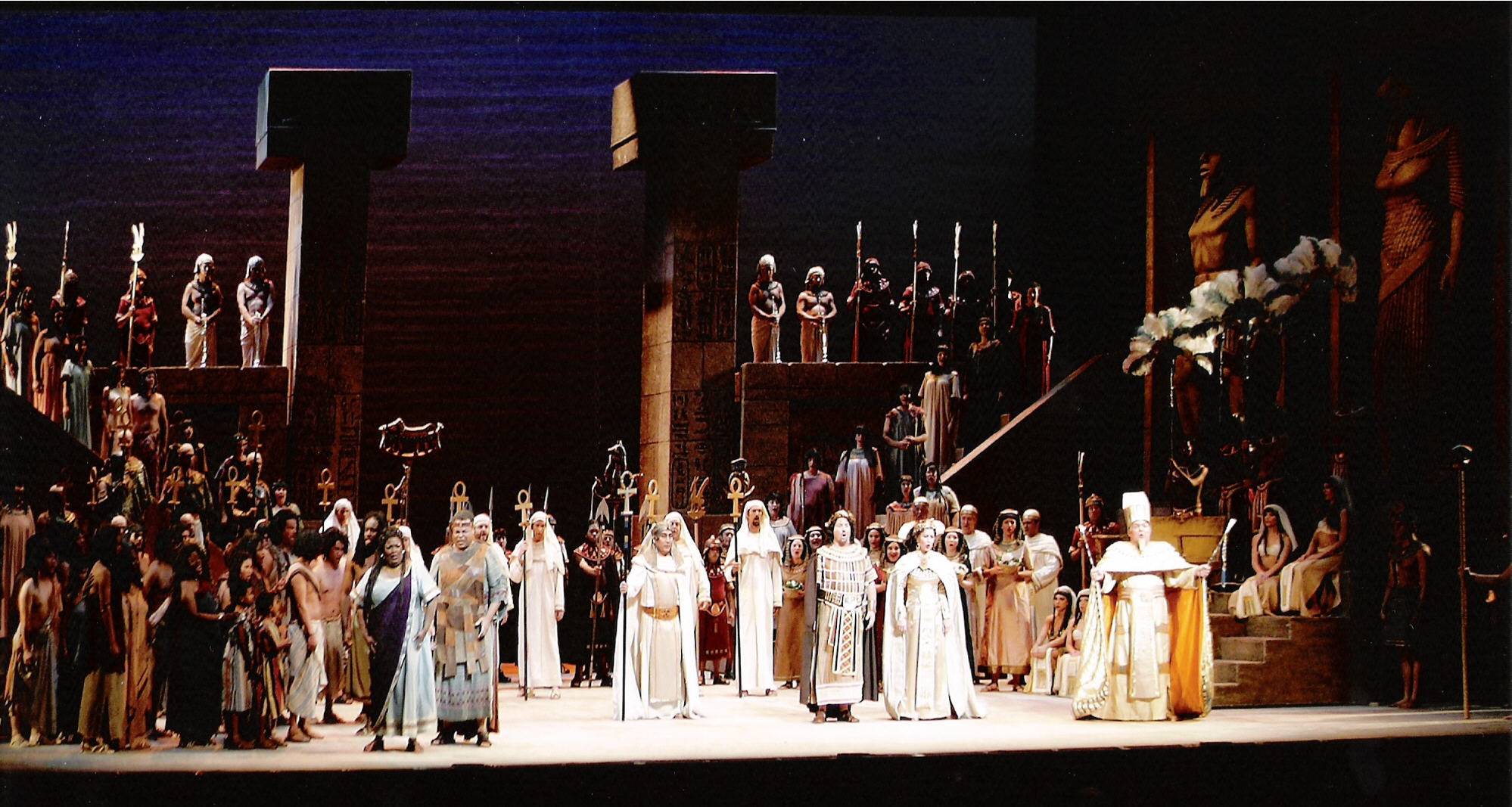
The "triumphal scene" from Opera Pacific's production of Aida in 2006, starring Angela Brown as Aida, Donnie Ray Albert as Amonasro, Andrew Gangestad as Ramfis, Carl Tanner as Radames, Milena Kitic as Amneris, and Stefan Szkafarowsky as King of Egypt.

Opera Pacific was an opera company located in the Orange County, California, United States city of Santa Ana. It operated for 22 seasons before closing in 2008 after several seasons of deepening financial difficulties.

== History ==
The first season began in 1985 with David DiChiera as General Director (until 1996), though the company traces its roots to 1962 and the annual Festival of Opera Association in Laguna Beach, where productions were performed in late summer at the Irvine Bowl, in English. In order to promote expansion, the Opera League of Laguna Beach was established to "encourage, support and sustain interest in the Festival of Opera." The first productions included such traditional repertory as Madame Butterfly, The Marriage of Figaro, and The Barber of Seville; I Pagliacci and The Devil and Daniel Webster were presented as a double billing during the 1965 season.

In the early 1980s members of the Opera Leaque, along with other opera aficionados throughout Orange County, combined to form the core audience for the anticipated opening of the Orange County Performing Arts Center in neighboring Costa Mesa, at which time Opera Pacific was incorporated. Opera Pacific has been host to many of opera's greatest living legends, including the likes of Luciano Pavarotti in 1988, Dame Joan Sutherland in 1989, and in 1991 Plácido Domingo (in concert with soprano Ana Panagulias). Diva Kathleen Battle also made an appearance in 2001.

At its peak the company put on six productions each year, staging around six performances of each, but in its last years this fell to three staged operas in four performances each. Its financial artistic director was John DeMain.

On November 4, 2008, Opera Pacific announced it would cancel the rest of its 2008/2009 season due to financial difficulties and would likely close down operations permanently.

The company ran an "Opera Camp" each summer.

== See also ==
- List of opera festivals
- List of opera companies
