= One Man's War (1982 film) =

One Man's War (French: La guerre d'un seul homme) is a 1982 French documentary film directed by Edgardo Cozarinsky. It is about the occupation of France during World War II and juxtaposes newsreel footage with excerpts from the journals of the German writer and military officer Ernst Jünger, who was stationed in Paris during the war. Niels Arestrup narrates the film.

== Release ==
The film was screened at the 1982 New York Film Festival. It was released in France on 6 April 1983 and the United States on 24 February 1984.

== Reception ==
Janet Maslin wrote in The New York Times: "Although it includes some grisly shots of wartime casualties, the film does not concentrate on brutality per se. It pays much more attention to the process by which French and Germans alike may have tried to ascribe normality to abnormal situations. ... One Man's War may not reveal much that is new, but it casts familiar observations in a newly disturbing light." Time Out wrote that "One Man's War brings World War II into focus not with the lying lens of the deadpan documentary, but through a series of highly original techniques which gain all the more brilliance by their obliqueness".
