= Stefan Szkafarowsky =

American opera singer (born 1956)

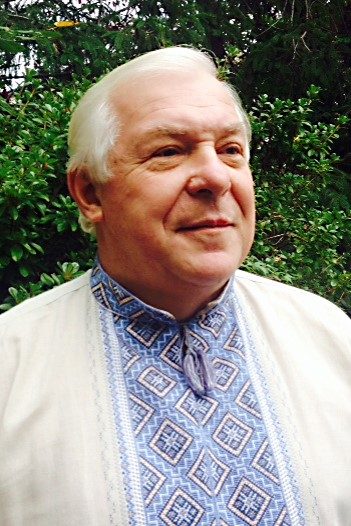
- Stefan Szkafarowsky in 2016
- Born: February 13, 1956; New York, USA
- Education: The American Opera Center at Juilliard and the Westchester Conservatory of Music
- Occupation: Opera singer (bass)

Stefan Szkafarowsky is an American opera singer (bass).

Szkafarowsky was born on February 13, 1956, and is a native of New York. He attended the American Opera Center at Juilliard and the Westchester Conservatory of Music. He is a recipient of grants from the Sullivan Foundation and the Tito Gobbi Award from the Rosa Ponselle Foundation. He is also a regional winner of the Metropolitan Opera Auditions.

== Singing career ==
As a concert artist, Szkafarowsky has been a featured soloist with the Pittsburgh Symphony, National Symphony in Washington, D.C., Minnesota Orchestra, St. Louis Symphony, Colorado Symphony, Hartford Symphony, Milwaukee Symphony and the Vancouver and Montreal Symphonies. He has worked under the batons of Plácido Domingo, Michael Lankaster, Mstislav Rostropovich, Leonard Slatkin and Michael Tilson Thomas.

His Italian debut in Tchaikovsky's The Oprichnik at the Cagliari Opera House was a highlight of Szkafarowsky's 2002/2003 season. In addition, he debuted with Minnesota Opera as the Grand Inquisitor in Don Carlo. Other performances include Ferrando in Verdi's Il trovatore and Crespel in The Tales of Hoffmann with Washington Opera; Zaccaria in Nabucco with Florentine Opera and Santiago, Chile; and Ramfis in Aida with New Jersey Opera. He has also performed with many other renowned opera companies such as the Lyric Opera of Chicago, New York City Opera, Grand Rapids Opera, New Orleans Opera, Arizona Opera, San Diego Opera, Dallas Opera, Pittsburgh Opera, Hamilton, Calgary, Edmonton, Montreal, Winnipeg, and Vancouver in such roles as Ramfis, Banquo, Sparafucile, Wurm, Prince Gremin, and Daland in The Flying Dutchman.

The 2003/2004 season had Szkafarowsky returning to the Metropolitan Opera in The Nightingale, Werther, and Salome. In the fall of 2004, he made his Atlanta Opera debut in the role of the Commendatore in Mozart's Don Giovanni. In 2005/2006, he sang the role of Prince Gremin in Eugene Onegin with Tulsa Opera; Banquo in Macbeth with Florentine Opera; The King in Aida with Opera Pacific; Benoit/Alcindoro in La bohème with Fort Worth Opera; Sarastro in Die Zauberflöte with the San Antonio Opera; Bonze in Madama Butterfly at Opéra de Québec; Commendatore in Don Giovanni with Opera Pacific; and Benoit/Alcindoro in La bohème and Dr. Bartolo in Le nozze di Figaro with the Metro Lyric Opera under the baton of Maestro Coppola.

Stefan Szkafarowsky in Santiago, Chile

In 2006/2007 he sang the role of Commendatore with Opera Pacific in Don Giovanni, followed by his debut with the Florida Grand Opera in Samson et Dalila as the Old Hebrew. Szkafarowsky made his debut with the Lake George Opera in their rendition of La bohème singing the roles of Benoit/Alcindoro, and sang Friar Lawrence in Roméo et Juliette at Toledo Opera. In 2007/2008, he played Sarastro in Die Zauberflöte for Indianapolis Opera; the King in Aida with Nevada Opera; the lackey Havrilo in War and Peace at the Metropolitan Opera; and at Florida Opera he performed the Sacristan in Tosca, and Benoit/Alcindoro in La bohème.

In the 2008/2009 season, he returned to the Metropolitan Opera for their productions of La Gioconda and Eugene Onegin. He performed at the West Palm Beach Opera Company in La bohème, as Benoit and Alcindoro. He also made his debut with Dayton Opera as Timur in Turandot, and he played Basilio in Il barbiere di Siviglia and Kuno in Der Freischütz at Des Moines Metro Opera. In 2009/2010, Szkafarowsky made his debut with the Nashville Opera performing both Sacristan and Sciarrone in their production of Tosca, followed by his debut in the Macau International Music Festival as Dr. Bartolo in Le nozze di Figaro.

The 2013/2014 and 2011/2012 Metropolitan Opera season found Szkafarowsky in the role of the Bonze in Puccini's Madama Butterfly with Plácido Domingo as conductor in 2011/2012. 2010/2011 engagements with the Metropolitan Opera included Szkafarowsky in their new production of The Nose, as well as in their production of Boris Godunov. During these same years, he made his debut at the Savonlinna Opera Festival in Finland as the Sacristan in Tosca; and he performed Vodnik in Rusalka with Opera Colorado; Mitiukh in Boris Godunov with Dallas Opera; a return to Savonlinna to perform the Sacristan in Tosca.

He made his New York City Opera debut on the NYCO's opening night for the 2016/17 season, on September 8, 2016, in a new production double bill of two operas that both premiered in May 1892. He made his debut in the title role in Aleko, directed by Lev Pugliese with conductor James Meena leading the NYCO Orchestra, at Rose Theater at Jazz at Lincoln Center.

== Press reviews ==
Prince Gremin in Eugene Onegin – "Here was a bass that actually hit a note in his lowest range ... besides effectively shaping the melodic line." – St. Louis Post Dispatch; "Stefan Szkafarowsky brought a regal bass to Prince Gremin's showcase aria." – San Diego Union Tribune

Filippo in Don Carlo – "Stefan Szkafarowsky sang a dynamically realized Filippo, displaying sure command of a mellifluous instrument." – Opera News

Zaccarias in Nabucco – "Stefan Szkafarowsky, by contrast, infused the prophet Zaccarias with a burning intensity that lifted the level of the show whenever he was on stage." – The Hartford Courant; "Bass Stefan Szkafarowsky's Zaccaria was smooth, liquid, and dignified; a natural and imposing figure for the high priest." – Newsday; "It was bass Stefan Szkafarowsky who had the greatest triumph due to his dynamic contrasts in Nabucco..." – Newsday

Raimondo in Lucia di Lammermoor – "Woods' performance was backed by several very strong performances... Stefan Szkafarowsky as Raimondo... whose thundering judgements are like a classic chorus." – Newsday; "A towering presence and one of the finest bass voices heard here in many years makes memorable the role of Raimondo, as sung by Stefan Szkafarowsky." – Times-Colonist; "Massive is an understatement to describe Stefan Szkafarowsky's bass voice – he rocked the hall with his mighty instrument." – The Grand Rapids Press

Lodovico in Otello – "A pleasant surprise was the deep bass of Stefan Szkafarowsky – a solid, mature Lodovico." – Pittsburgh Post-Gazette

Ferrando in Il trovatore – "Far more vital was the Ferrando of Stefan Szkafarowsky whose 'Abbietta zingara' set the tone for the production – dark, grand, and infused with rhythmic incisiveness." – Opera News

== Repertoire ==
- Beethoven: Fidelio, Rocco
- Bellini: La sonnambula, Count Rodolfo
- Boito: Mefistofele, Mefistofele
- Borodin: Prince Igor, Prince Galitsky
- Donizetti: Anna Bolena, Enrico VII; Don Pasquale Don Pasquale; L'elisir d'amore, Dulcamare / Belcore; Lucia di Lammermoor, Raimondo
- Giordano: Andrea Chénier, Mathieu
- Gounod: Roméo et Juliette, Friar Lawrence
- Mozart: Die Zauberflöte, Sarastro; Don Giovanni, Commendatore; Le nozze di Figaro, Dr. Bartolo
- Mussorgsky: Boris Godunov, Varlaam / Pimen
- Offenbach: Les contes d'Hoffmann, Crispel
- Ponchielli: La Gioconda, Alvise
- Puccini: La bohème, Benoit/Alcindoro, Colline; Madama Butterfly, Bonze; Tosca, Sacristan / Sciarrone; Turandot, Timur
- Rossini: The Barber of Seville, Basilio
- Saints-Saëns: Samson et Dalila, Old Hebrew
- Strauss, R.: Salome, First Nazarene / 5th Jew
- Tchaikovsky: Eugene Onegin, Prince Gremin
- Verdi: Aida, Ramfis / King; Don Carlo, King Phillip / Grand Inquisitor / Frate; Il trovatore, Ferrando; La forza del destino, Padre Guardiano / Melitone; Luisa Miller, Wurm; Macbeth, Banquo; Nabucco, Zaccaria; Otello, Lodovico; Rigoletto, Sparafucile / Monterone; Simone Boccanegra, Fiesco; Un ballo in maschera, Tom
- von Weber: Der Freischütz, Kuno
- Wagner: Das Rheingold, Fasolt; Der Fliegende Holländer, Daland; Lohengrin, King Henry
