= Vasily Gerello =

Russian opera singer

Vasily Gerello Василий Герелло
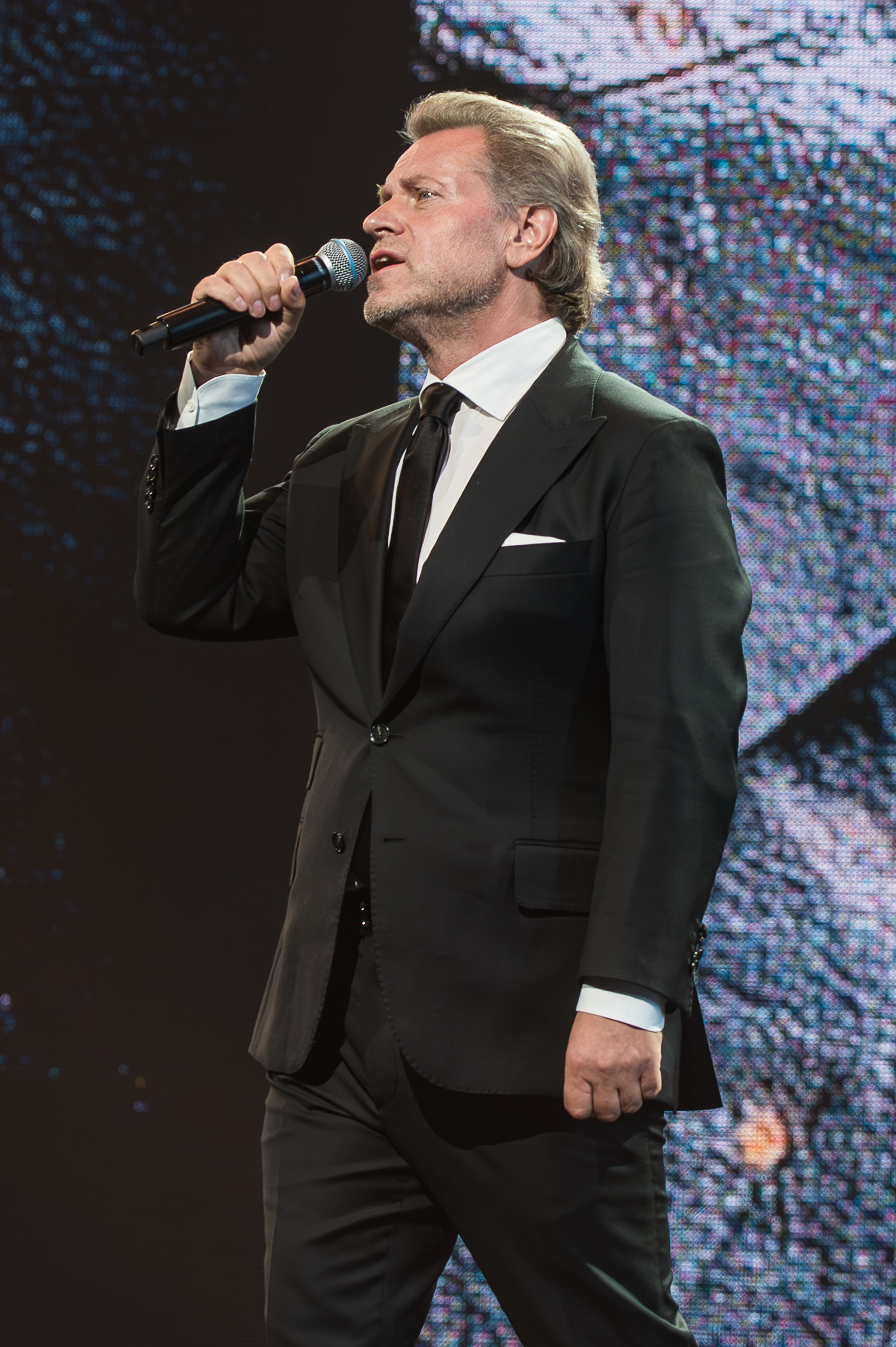
- Vasily Gerello at the concert "Impregnable Height" at the Oktyabrsky Concert Hall (2025)

Background information
- Born: Vasily Georgievich Gerello; 13 March 1963 (age 63); Vaslovivtsi, Chernivtsi Oblast, Ukrainian SSR, Soviet Union
- Genres: Opera, chamber music
- Occupation: Opera singer
- Instrument: Voice (baritone)
- Years active: 1990–present
- Member of: Mariinsky Theatre
- Awards: People's Artist of Russia; Merited Artist of Russia; Order of Friendship

Vasily Georgievich Gerello (Russian: Василий Георгиевич Герелло; born 13 March 1963) is a Soviet-born Russian opera singer (baritone). He has been a soloist of the Mariinsky Theatre since 1990. He was named Merited Artist of Ukraine in 2006, a title that was revoked by a decree of the president of Ukraine in 2025, and People's Artist of Russia in 2008.

== Early life and education ==
Gerello was born in the village of Vaslovivtsi in Chernivtsi Oblast, then part of the Ukrainian Soviet Socialist Republic. According to interviews, he began singing as a child and, as a teenager, performed at weddings while playing a German Hohner accordion given to him by his father. He also learned to play the bayan, garmon, trumpet and saxophone.

He began his musical education at the Chernivtsi Art School, but was drafted into the army after one year, where he played in a military brass band. After completing his military service, he returned to the college to study voice. He later entered the Leningrad Conservatory, where he studied with Nina Serval, and graduated in 1991.

== Career ==
In 1990, while still a fourth-year conservatory student, Gerello was invited to join the Mariinsky Theatre. His debut role at the theatre was Valentin in Gounod's Faust. He subsequently performed roles including Onegin in Eugene Onegin and Rodrigo in Don Carlos. He has also been described as the first singer at the Mariinsky Theatre to perform La traviata in the original language.

Gerello's international debut took place while he was still a student, when he sang Figaro in The Barber of Seville at Dutch National Opera. The production was conducted by Alberto Zedda and directed by Dario Fo.

With the Mariinsky Theatre, Gerello has toured in Spain, Italy, Scotland, Finland, France and Portugal. He has appeared at opera houses including the Opéra Bastille in Paris, the Semperoper in Dresden, the Deutsche Oper Berlin, the Berlin State Opera, the Metropolitan Opera in New York, the Vienna State Opera, the Royal Opera House in London, La Fenice in Venice, the Canadian Opera Company in Toronto, the Teatro Colón in Buenos Aires, the Municipal Theatre of São Paulo, the Santiago Opera in Chile, La Scala in Milan, and opera houses in Amsterdam and Bergen.

He has also performed in concert venues including Carnegie Hall in New York and the Royal Albert Hall in London, and with orchestras including the Dallas and New York symphony orchestras. His festival appearances have included the Stars of the White Nights festival and the Moscow Easter Festival. According to the Mariinsky Theatre, he has worked with conductors including Valery Gergiev, Riccardo Muti, Chung Myung-whun, Claudio Abbado, Bernard Haitink and Fabio Luisi.

In 2000, Gerello appeared in the French opera film La guerre et la paix, directed by François Roussillon. In 2016, the Russian television channel Russia-K aired a documentary about him titled Vasily Gerello. In the Key of Happiness.

== Political position and sanctions ==
On 18 March 2022, Gerello performed at the rally-concert at Luzhniki Stadium marking the anniversary of Russia's annexation of Crimea. He also took part in the patriotic concert tour "Za Rossiyu", associated with support for the Russian invasion of Ukraine. On 20 March 2022, authorities in Chernivtsi removed a star honouring Gerello from a local avenue of stars, citing his support for the invasion.

In May, Latvia banned Gerello from entering the country, citing his support for and justification of Russia's aggression against Ukraine. Ukraine's National Agency on Corruption Prevention also included him in its sanctions-related database, stating that he had played a role in Russian propaganda and supported Russian policies undermining Ukraine's territorial integrity and sovereignty.

In April 2024, Ukrainian media reported that the Security Service of Ukraine had notified Gerello in absentia of suspicion over alleged public calls to change Ukraine's state borders and constitutional order, incitement of national enmity, and public calls for aggressive war.

== Personal life ==
Gerello is married to Alyona Gerello, a choirmaster. They married on 8 October 1983 after meeting during his military service in Chernivtsi.

== Awards and honours ==
- Order of Friendship (28 March 2019), for contributions to Russian culture, art and media
- People's Artist of Russia (2008)
- Merited Artist of Russia (19 May 2003)
- Merited Artist of Ukraine (17 August 2006; revoked in 2025)
- Badge of Distinction "For Services to Saint Petersburg" (2018)
- Honorary Badge "For Services to the Development of Culture and Art", CIS Interparliamentary Assembly (27 November 2014)
- Laureate, BBC Cardiff Singer of the World (1993)
- First prize, International Competition for Young Opera Singers named after Nikolai Rimsky-Korsakov, Saint Petersburg (1994)
- Laureate, Tsarskoselskaya Art Award (1998)
- Laureate, Zolotoy sofit theatre award (1999)
- Andrei Mironov Russian National Acting Award "Figaro" (2023)
- Fortissimo music prize of the Saint Petersburg Conservatory, in the category "Performing mastery"

== Selected roles ==
Gerello's repertoire has included the following opera roles:

- Pastor in Khovanshchina
- Shchelkalov in Boris Godunov
- Onegin in Eugene Onegin
- Robert in Iolanta
- Tomsky and Yeletsky in The Queen of Spades
- Pantalone in The Love for Three Oranges
- Napoleon in War and Peace
- Figaro in The Barber of Seville
- Lord Enrico Ashton in Lucia di Lammermoor
- Giorgio Germont in La traviata
- Renato in Un ballo in maschera
- Don Carlo in La forza del destino
- Rodrigo, Marquis of Posa, in Don Carlos
- Macbeth in Macbeth
- Amonasro in Aida
- Ford in Falstaff
- Marcello in La bohème
- Sharpless in Madama Butterfly
- Valentin in Faust
- Count Almaviva in The Marriage of Figaro

His repertoire has also included the Duke in The Miserly Knight, Papageno in The Magic Flute, Giulio Cesare in Giulio Cesare, Simon Boccanegra in Simon Boccanegra, Riccardo Forth in I puritani, Alfio in Cavalleria rusticana, Filippo Maria Visconti in Beatrice di Tenda, Tonio in Pagliacci, Don Carlo in Ernani, and Count di Luna in Il trovatore.
