= Edgardo Cozarinsky =

Argentine writer and filmmaker (1939–2024)

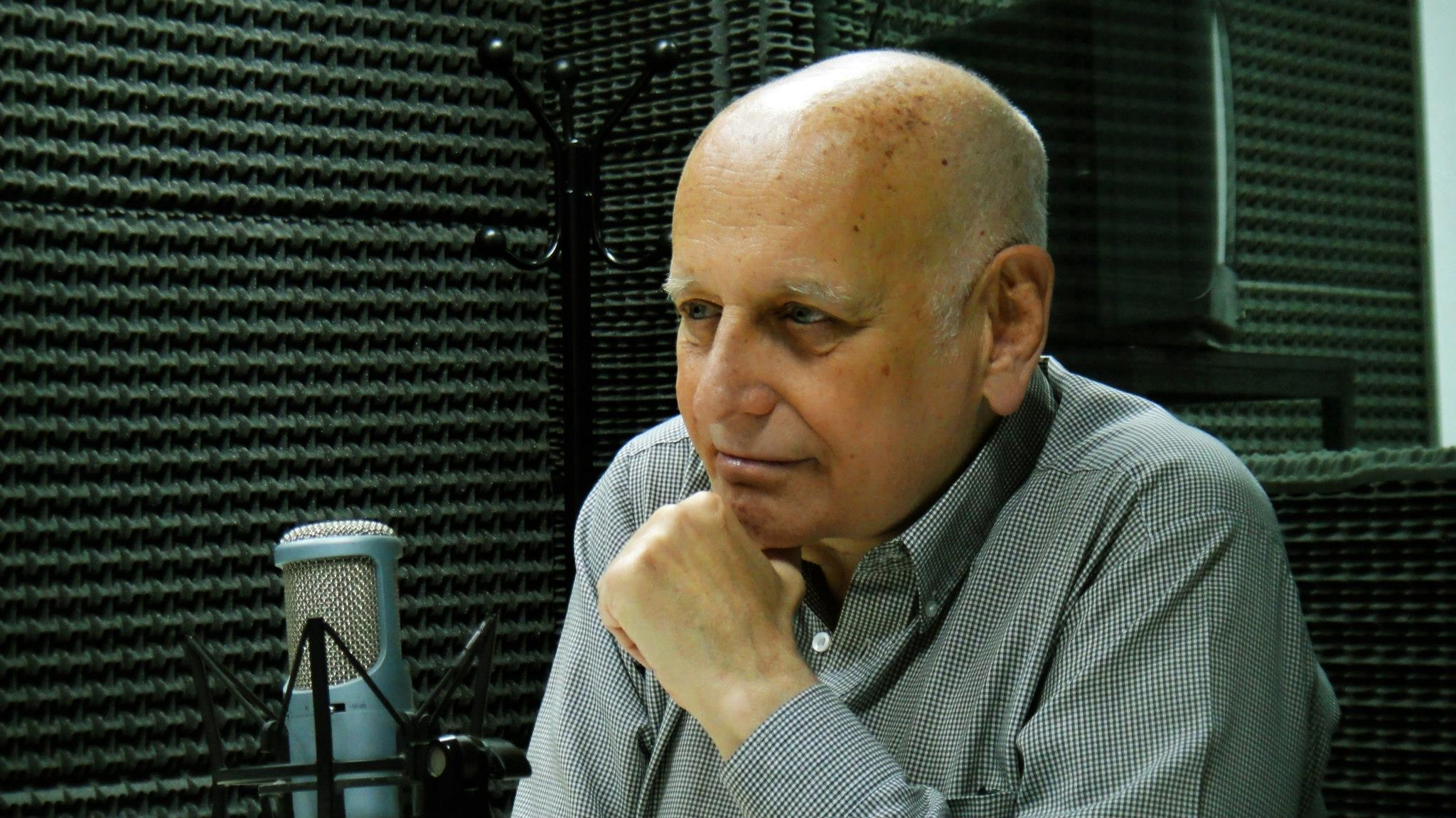
- Cozarinsky in 2015
- Born: Edgardo Cozarinsky; 13 January 1939; Buenos Aires, Argentina
- Died: 2 June 2024 (aged 85); Buenos Aires, Argentina
- Occupations: Writer and filmmaker
- Years active: 1967-2024

Edgardo Cozarinsky (Spanish pronunciation: [eðˈɣaɾðo kosaˈɾinski]; 13 January 1939 – 2 June 2024) was an Argentine writer and filmmaker. He was best known for his Spanish-language novel Vudú urbano.

== Life and career ==
Cozarinsky was born to an Argentine family of Ukrainian-Jewish descent. His name reflects his mother's enthusiasm for the writings of Edgar Allan Poe, while his surname comes from his grandparents, Ukrainian Jewish immigrants who arrived in Argentina from Kiev and Odessa in the late nineteenth century.

After an adolescence spent in neighbourhood cinemas showing double bills of old Hollywood films and reading an inordinate amount of fiction in Spanish, English and French (favourite authors – Robert Louis Stevenson, Joseph Conrad, Henry James), he studied literature at Buenos Aires University, wrote for local and Spanish cinephile magazines, and published an early essay on James, which he developed from his university thesis – El laberinto de la apariencia (The Labyrinth of Appearance, 1964), a book which he later suppressed. In his early twenties he became acquainted with Jorge Luis Borges, Adolfo Bioy Casares and Silvina Ocampo in Buenos Aires. In 1973 he won a literary prize for his essay on gossip as narrative device in the writings of James and Proust. In 1974 he published Borges y el cine, a book that he expanded in every reprint (Spain, 1978 and 2002, and translations). He thereafter, however, declined to have this book reprinted.

Cozarinsky visited Europe from September 1966 to June 1967, stopping for a visit to New York City on his return to Buenos Aires. Arriving back home, he more fully committed himself to his writing. He wrote for the culture sections of the Argentine weeklies Primera Plana and Panorama, then he produced his first film. It was an underground feature shot on weekends over the course of a year, knowing as he did that it could not pass the local censorship of the period. It was nevertheless screened at festivals throughout Europe and the United States. Its title was already a challenge – ... (Puntos suspensivos – Dot Dot Dot).

During the turmoil of Argentina's Dirty War, Cozarinsky left Buenos Aires for Paris, where he concentrated on his filmmaking. He produced fiction films and "essays", mixing documentary material with personal reflections on the material. The most distinguished of these is La Guerre d'un seul homme (One Man's War, 1981), a confrontation between Ernst Jünger's wartime diaries and French newsreels of the occupation period. At a time when European television networks were willing to support such ventures, Cozarinsky was able to develop this approach in a series of original works.

During the period 1970–1990, Cozarinsky published little. However, his sole novel from the period gained a wide audience - Vudú urbano (Urban voodoo, 1985), a mixture of fiction and essay not unlike his film work, with prologues by Susan Sontag and Cuban writer Guillermo Cabrera Infante.

Cozarinsky returned to Buenos Aires for a short stay after the end of Argentina's military junta. He then returned three years later to produce Guerreros y cautivas (Warriors and Captive Women), filmed in the country's far southern reaches. He visited Argentina several times after that, occasionally filming segments or backgrounds for his films. His most adventurous later films were Rothschild's Violin and Ghosts of Tangier, both made between 1995 and 1996.

Cozarinsky was diagnosed with cancer in 1999. This motivated him to dedicate his remaining time to his writing. While still in the hospital following his diagnosis he wrote the first two stories for La novia de Odessa (The Bride from Odessa). From that date on, his film work became sparse and he started publishing "all the books I had not put on paper", fiction mostly but also essays and chronicles. He became established as a Spanish-language writer, and his works were also translated into several other languages.

During this period he spent most of his time in Buenos Aires, returning to Paris for regular short stays. In 2005 he wrote and directed a play (Squash) and wrote a mini-opera Raptos (Raptures). In that year he also appeared on the alternative stage along with his medical doctor, in one of Vivi Tellas' "documentary theater" ventures -Cozarinsky y su médico. In 2008 he started work on the libretto for a chamber opera with the musician Pablo Mainetti – Ultramarina, based on motives from his own novel El rufián moldavo (The Moldavian Pimp).

Cozarinsky filmed in such diverse locations as Budapest, Rotterdam, Tallinn, Tangiers, Vienna, Granada, Saint Petersburg, Seville and Patagonia. Later in life, he alternated most of his time between Buenos Aires and Paris.

Cozarinsky died on 2 June 2024, at the age of 85.

== Partial bibliography ==
- Vudú urbano (Urban Voodoo), stories, essays, memories (1985)
- La novia de Odessa (The Bride from Odessa), short stories (2001)(First prize to a volume of short stories, City of Buenos Aires; Platinum prize to a volume of short stories, Konex Foundation)
- El pase del testigo (Passing the baton / The Witness Goes By), essays and chronicles (2001)
- El rufián moldavo (The Moldavian Pimp), novel (2004)
- Museo del chisme (Museum of Gossip), essay and stories (2005)
- Tres fronteras (Three Frontiers), short stories (2006)
- Palacios plebeyos (Plebeian Palaces), chronicles and a short story (2006)
- Maniobras nocturnas (Night-time maneuvers), novel (2007)
- Milongas, chronicles and short stories (2007)
- Burundanga, short stories (2009)
- Lejos de dónde (Far from where), novel (2009)(Prize for the best novel 2008–2010, Academia Argentina de Letras)
- Blues, chronicles and memories (2010)
- La tercera mañana (The Third Morning), novel (2010 Spain)(2011 Argentina)
- Dinero para fantasmas (Money for Ghosts), novel, (2012 Argentina)(2013 Spain)
- Nuevo museo del chisme (New Gossip Museum), essay and stories (2013)
- En ausencia de guerra (In Absence of War), novel (2014)
- Disparos en la oscuridad (Shots in the Dark), essays (2015)
- Dark, novel (2016)
- Niño enterrado (Buried Child), memories and chronicles (2016)
- En el último trago nos vamos, stories (2017)(García Márquez prize for a Latin American volume of short stories)
- El vicio impune, essays (2017)
- Cuentos reunidos, collected stories (2019)
- Los libros y la calle, memories (2019)
- Turno noche, novel (2020)
- Cielo sucio, novel (2022)

== Film work (feature-length and short films, fiction and "essays") ==
- ... (Puntos suspensivos) (Dot Dot Dot) (1971)
- Les Apprentis Sorciers (The Apprentice Sorcerers) (1976)
- La Guerre d'un seul homme (One Man's War) (1981)
- Autoportrait d'un inconnu – Jean Cocteau (Self-portrait of a Man Unknown – Jean Cocteau) (1983)
- Haute Mer (High Seas) (1984)
- Pour Memoire – Les Klarsfeld, une famille dans l'Histoire (To be Remembered – The Klarsfelds, a family in History) (1985)
- Sarah (1988)
- Guerreros y cautivas (Warriors and Captive Women) (1989)
- BoulevardS du crépuscule (Sunset BoulevardS) (1992)
- Scarlatti à Séville (1994)
- Citizen Langlois (1994)
- La barraca: Lorca sur les chemins de l'Espagne (La barraca: Lorca on the road in Spain) (1995)
- Le Violon de Rothschild (Rothschild's Violin), short opera (1996)
- Fantômes de Tanger (Ghosts of Tangier) (1997)
- Le Cinéma des Cahiers (The Cinema of Cahiers) (2000)
- Tango-Désir (Tango Desire) (2002)
- Dans le Rouge du Couchant (Red Dusk) (2003)
- Rond Nocturna (Night Watch) (2005)
- Apuntes para una biografía imaginaria (Notes for an Imaginary Biography) (2010)
- Nocturnos (2011)
- Carta a un padre (Letter to a Father) (2013)
- Medium (2019)
