= Stagione =

System for presenting opera

Stagione (Italian for "season") is an organizational system for presenting opera, often used by large houses. Typically each production is cast separately and has a brief but intensive run of performances. By contrast, companies that use a repertory system maintain a permanent company and rotate productions over many months or even years. Historically the stagione system has been preferred in Britain, the United States, and most large international operahouses.

== Sources ==
- The Oxford Dictionary of Opera, by John Warrack and Ewan West (1992), 782 pages, ISBN 0-19-869164-5
- The New Grove Dictionary of Opera, ed. Stanley Sadie (London, 1992) ISBN 0-333-73432-7
