= Ludovic Spiess =

Romanian singer (1939 - 2006)

Ludovic Spiess (13 May 1939 – 28 February 2006) was a Romanian spinto tenor and Minister of Culture.

Spiess was born in Cluj in 1938. After leaving school early and working at a factory in Brasov he studied at the Music Academy in Bucharest. He made his debut as the Duke of Mantua in Verdi's Rigoletto at Galați in 1962. A win at a competition in Toulouse and a Cavaradossi in Bucharest eventually led to his being discovered in 1967 by Herbert von Karajan, who recruited him for the role of Dmitri in the Salzburg Festival's production of Boris Godunov. Spiess made his American debut in 1968 as Calaf in Turandot. In the 70s he increasingly focused on Verdi roles.

After an international career spanning some fourteen years, Spiess was forced to abandon singing after discovering that irreparable damage had been done to his vocal cords. He went on to serve as the Romanian minister of culture in the Iliescu government during the 1990s, and later assumed the directorship of the Romanian National Opera, Bucharest from 2001 until 2005.

He reportedly died of a heart attack on January 28, 2006 while hunting in a southern Romanian forest.
