= Yevgeny Nikitin (bass-baritone) =

Russian bass-baritone opera singer

Yevgeny Igorevich Nikitin (Russian: Евгений Игоревич Никитин) is a Russian bass-baritone opera singer. In the West he is usually billed as "Evgeny Nikitin"

Born in the Arctic port city of Murmansk, he trained at the Saint Petersburg Conservatory, graduated in 1997. Since his debut as a student he has performed at the Mariinsky Theatre; he also appears as an international soloist. He made his debut at the Metropolitan Opera in Sergei Prokofiev's War and Peace in 2002; he has regularly returned to the New York company and is due to sing the Wagnerian role of Klingsor in 2013.

In 2008, Nikitin was awarded the title of Honoured Artist of Russia.

== Repertoire ==
Nikitin sings various roles in Italian, Russian and German operas mostly. Roles in Wagner's operas hold a special place in Nikitin's repertoire, as a Wagnerian singer he has been noted by music critics.

Roles that Evgeny Nikitin has performed include:

- Holländer (Der fliegende Holländer)
- Hermann (Tannhäuser)
- Friedrich von Telramund (Lohengrin)
- Kurwenal (Tristan und Isolde)
- Veit Pogner (Die Meistersinger von Nürnberg)
- Amfortas, Klingsor (Parsifal)
- Wotan (The Wanderer) (Das Rheingold, Die Walküre, Siegfried)
- Gunther (Götterdämmerung)
- Jochanaan (Salome)
- Orest (Elektra)
- Ruslan (Ruslan and Lyudmila)
- Boris Godunov, Andrey Shchelkalov, Rangoni (Boris Godunov)
- Fyodor Shaklovity (Khovanshchina)
- Ibn-Hakia (Iolanta)
- Thibaut d'Arc (The Maid of Orleans)
- Ruprecht (The Fiery Angel)
- Fyodor Dolokhov (War and Peace)
- Ramfis (Aida)
- Attila (Attila)
- Banco (Macbeth)
- Lodovico (Otello)
- Filippo II (Don Carlos)
- Il Marchese di Calatrava (La forza del destino)
- Baron Scarpia (Tosca)
- Colline (La bohème)
- High Priest of Dagon (Samson and Delilah)

== Tattoo controversy ==
Nikitin was scheduled to sing the title role in Wagner's opera The Flying Dutchman at the opening of the 2012 Bayreuth Festival, which would have made him the first Russian in history to assume an opening title role there. But days before the festival began, he withdrew and was replaced by Samuel Youn after tattoos on his chest were shown by German media in still images from a video shot in 2006 or 2007. These suggested Nazi sympathies, which the singer subsequently denied. The main controversial tattoo in the video still images, a partly covered swastika, had been completely covered by a large 8-pointed star design by the time of the Bayreuth withdrawal. Nikitin released at least two conflicting statements about the matter. First, at Bayreuth, he described the tattooing as a "mistake of youth" made when he was 16 years old. Second, via the press office of the Mariinsky Theatre, he explained that a swastika never had been his intention and that the 8-pointed star had been assembled in stages.

Nikitin's appearances in another Wagner opera later in 2012, with the Bavarian State Opera, remain scheduled.
