= Michail Svetlev =

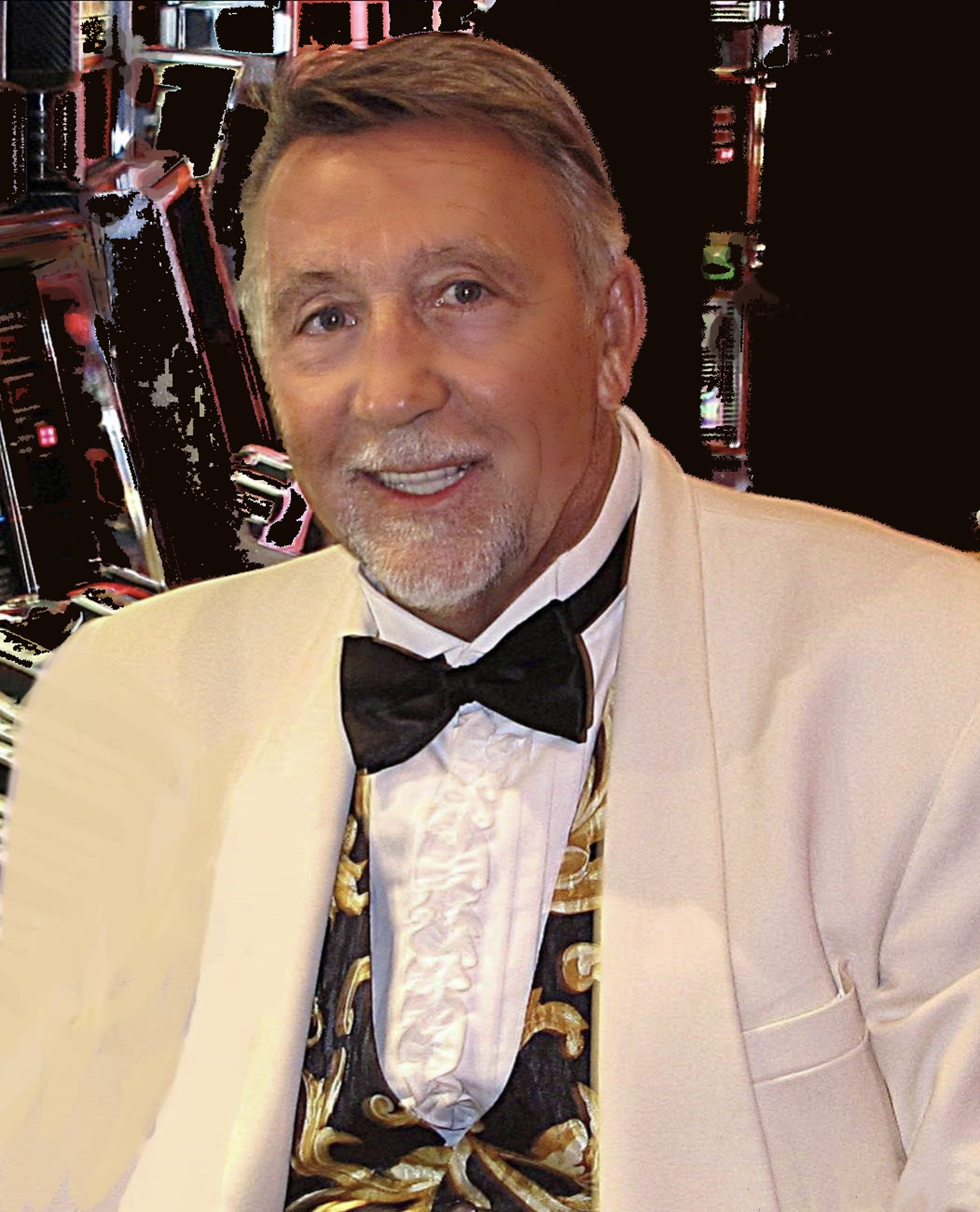

Background information
- Also known as: spelled Mikhail, Michael, or Mihayl Svetlev in some countries
- Born: March 6, 1943 (age 83); Sofia, Bulgaria
- Genre: Opera
- Instrument: Tenor Vocal
- Label: Sony

Michail Svetlev (Bulgarian: Михаил Светлев) is an internationally acclaimed opera tenor born 6 March 1943 in Sofia, Bulgaria. He is known for his interpretations of leading tenor roles in French, Italian, German and Russian operas, and an extensive repertoire of Neapolitan and Italian songs.

== Life and career ==
=== 1960s ===
Upon completion of theology schooling at the Holy Seminary in Sofia, Bulgaria, he went on to study opera singing with noted Bulgarian and European pedagogues, including Stojan Kissjov and Anita Salta. He received the Silver Medal in Italy's International Vercelli Opera Competition in 1968 and became a member of the National Operetta Sofia the same year.

=== 1970s ===
During the 1970 student music festival in Bayreuth conducted by Pierre Boulez, Svetlev was discovered by Boulez's assistant, Bernhard Lang, general music director in Passau, Germany. This led to Svetlev's engagement there, where in 1971 he began his operatic career singing the leading tenor role of Manrico in Verdi's "Il Trovatore." A few months later, Svetlev began a 3-year contract with the Gärtnerplatztheater in Munich, where he sang the leading opera tenor roles and operettas.

In the next few years, he expanded his repertoire as an Italian tenor and performed in many German opera houses, including Augsburg, Bremen, Stuttgart, Mannheim, and Düsseldorf. He worked intensively with Italian conductor Alberto Erede and baritone Tito Gobbi.

Michail Svetlev singing "Di Quella Pira" in opera "Trovatore"

Svetlev's appearance in a German TV Show with Anneliese Rothenberger in 1977 had great impact on the beginning of his international career. This was followed by engagements in Amsterdam, Sofia, Strasbourg, Paris, and other European cities. His first appearance at the Vienna State Opera was in 1979 in the leading tenor role of Herman in Tschaikowsky's "Pique Dame."

Michail Svetlev made his debut in La Scala in Milan on December 7, 1979, with the tenor role of Dimitrii in Mussorgsky's "Boris Godunov." After that, he appeared repeatedly in La Scala and at the leading opera houses including Covent Garden in London, the Vienna State Opera, Deutsche Oper am Rhein, Teatro Colon in Buenos Aires, Berlin, Munich, Hamburg, Bonn, New York, Rome, Paris, Zurich, Lausanne, Toronto, Pretoria, Tel Aviv, Monte Carlo, Nice, Marseille, Mexico City, Las Vegas, Kopenhagen, Salzburg, Athens, and many others.

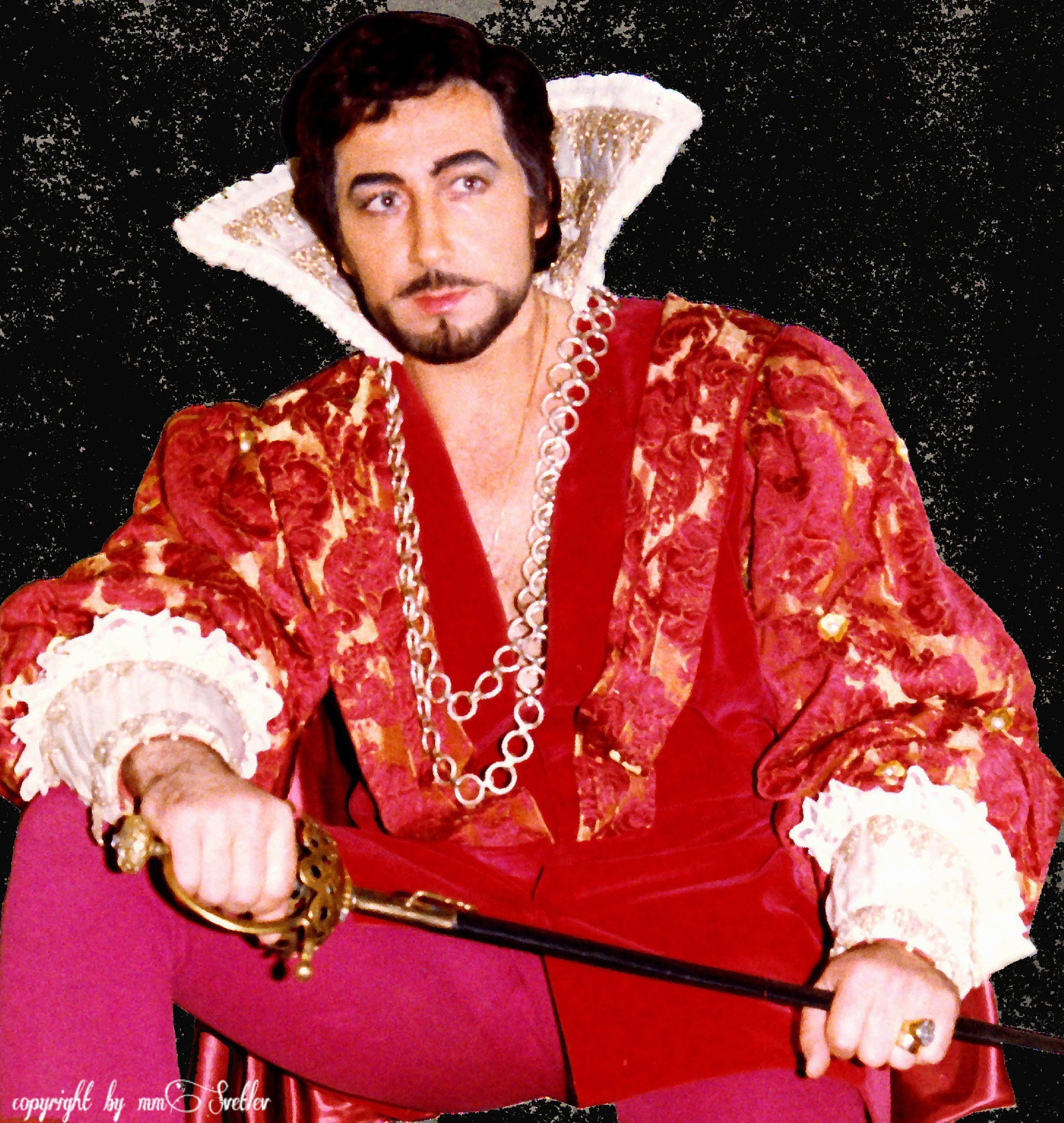
Michail Svetlev as Duke of Mantova in "Rigoletto"

=== 1980s to Today ===
Michail Svetlev debuted in the United States in 1980 as Ricardo in Verdi's "Un Ballo in Maschera" in Washington, D.C. Further appearances included opera companies in San Francisco, Houston, Miami, Philadelphia, and Palm Beach.

Throughout his career he was recognized not just for his talent as a singer, but also for his talent as an actor, with more than 60 major tenor roles ranging from the lyric to the dramatic operatic repertoire. Mr. Svetlev participated in the tours of The Metropolitan Opera Guild. He also sang classical programs worldwide, accompanied by his wife, pianist Zornitza Svetlev.

Michail Svetlev is also a vocal adviser to many singers and gives master classes on occasion. He has three children - Alexander, Katarina, and Michail Jr. and lives most of the year in Germany.

== Colleagues ==
=== Co-Stars ===
Michail Svetlev co-starred with numerous leading singers including Montserrat Caballé, Mirella Freni, Renata Scotto, Leontyne Price, Margaret Price, Martina Arroyo, Raina Kabaivanska, Leonie Rysanek, Edita Gruberova, Fiorenza Cossotto, Hildegard Behrens, Tito Gobbi, Sherill Milnes, Piero Cappuccilli, Leo Nucci, Ruggero Raimondi, Robert Lloyd, and Paul Plishka.

=== Conductors and directors ===
Mr. Svetlev has worked with numerous conductors and directors including Herbert von Karajan, Zubin Mehta, Claudio Abbado, Anton Guadagno, Nello Santi, Seiji Ozawa, Miguel Ángel Gómez Martínez, Mstislav Rostropovich, Marc Soustrot, Alain Lombard, Edo de Waart, Emerson Buckley, Charles Mackerras, Jean-Pierre Ponnelle, Roman Polanski, Tito Capobianco, Lotfi Mansouri, Otto Schenk, and Giancarlo del Monaco.

=== Orchestras ===
Michail Svetlev has sung with symphony orchestras around the world, including the New York Philharmonic, Tel Aviv, Vienna, Berlin, Munich, Paris, Mexico City. He has recorded for radio and television in Germany, Austria, Bulgaria, France and the United States.

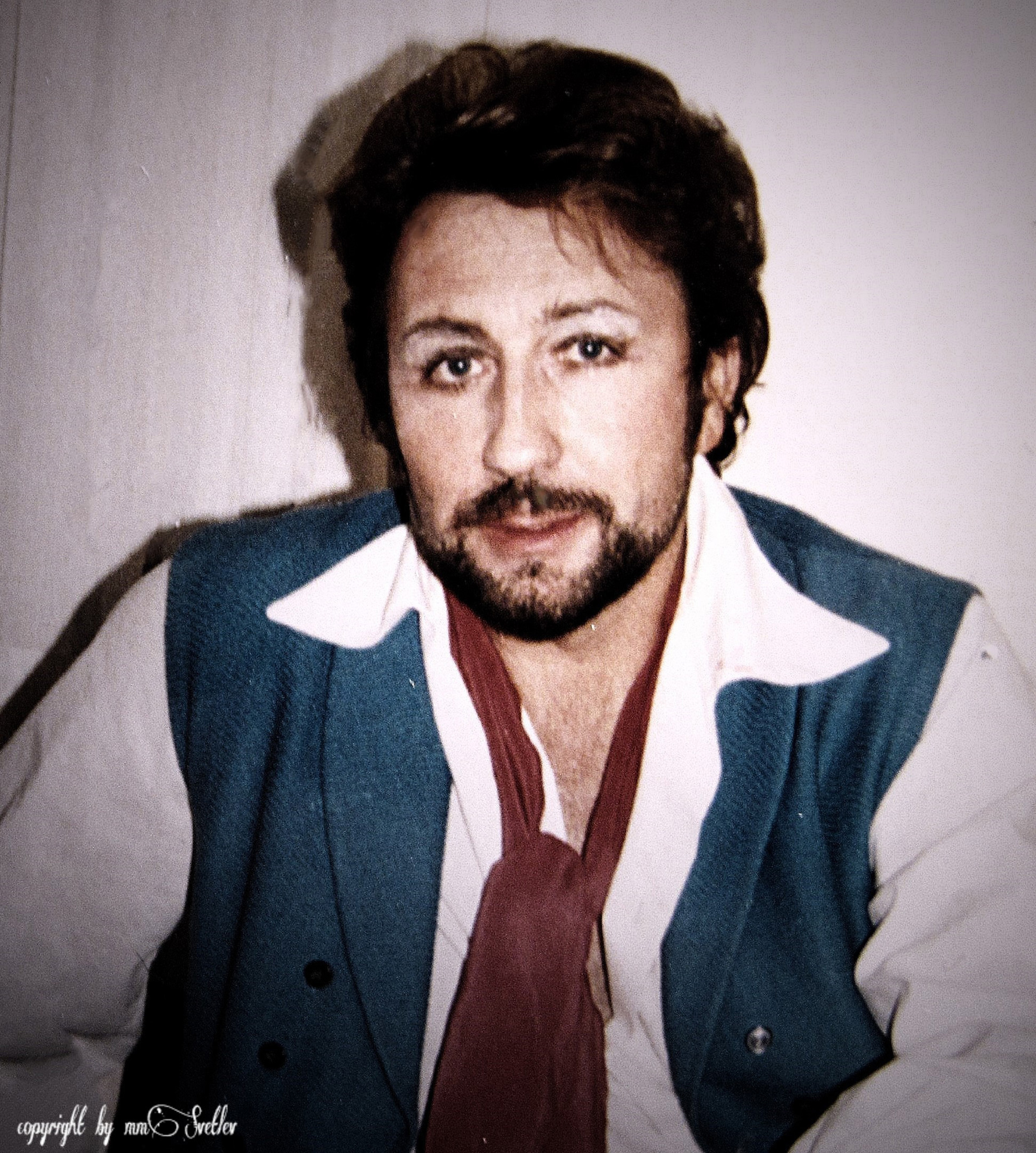
Michail Svetlev as Cavaradossi in "Tosca"

== Albums and Recordings ==
Michail Svetlev has recorded several albums and live performances of arias and Italian songs including the following:

- 1978 - Live recording of "Simon Boccanegra" at Netherlands Opera, conductor Hans Vonk
- 1978 and 2003 - Live recording of "Boris Godunov" at La Scala Milano, conductor Claudio Abbado
- 1980 - LP titled "Opera recital of Michael Svetlev", produced and issued by Balkanton in Sofia, Bulgaria
- 1991 - CD titled "'O sole mio' Celebri canzoni", by GEGA, LTD in Sofia, Bulgaria
- 1991 - complete CD recording of "Boris Godunov" for the Sony label
- 1993 - Live recording of "Cavalleria Rusticana" at Vienna State Opera, ORF Edition

== Reviews ==
- "...There is a new tenor - new to this country, but destined to be well known and fervently admired in a short time. Making his U.S. debut as the Ricardo, the King, the Bulgarian Michail Svetlev is - mirabile dictu! - slim and handsome as well as blessed with a rich, solid lyric tenor ... marked as a treasure even in today's world, where there are several first-class tenors ... very high praise goes to this welcome new star..."
- "Mickail Svetlev, tenor, who made his American debut here as Ricardo could make one forget Pavarotti's phenomenal Ricardo of last year's Metropolitan opera production of "Un Ballo"... a voice of unequaled beauty, and matchless vocal scale spanning the two octaves from C to C as even as a string of pearls...
- "...His voice was sometimes 'too heavy' for some critics ... The critics said ... that here was finally the Tenor to fill the shoes of Corelli ... Svetlev has, in fact, become a favorite of the Milanese (La Scala), who refer to him lovingly as 'Siciliano'..."
- "...the Tenor Michail Svetlev might be a prime contender for Franco Corelli’s big empty boots... Mr. Svetlev is an impressive fellow. Tall, slim, and equipped with a smooth, strong voice...”
- Translated from German: "The event of the evening was Michail Svetlev with powerful vocal material. Slightly metallic timbre. Great in the increase. Herman is his precision work. Moreover, with so much charisma."
- Translated from Italian: "...For the "false Dimitri" a true tenor and Bulgarian Mihayl Svetlev..."
- Translated from German: "At the end of the performance, as the singer of Hermann - Michail Svetlev - came before the curtain, the Viennese audience erupted in ovations, as it had previously after hearing Pavarotti or Domingo."
- Translated from German: "Milan: a cheering ovations as the day before Domingo in 'Pagliacci' Mihayl Svetlev could reap as Dmitri... with his impulsive play and remarkable singing so good that the door for him to La Scala in 1981 was again wide open."
