= Vladimir Matorin =

Russian opera singer

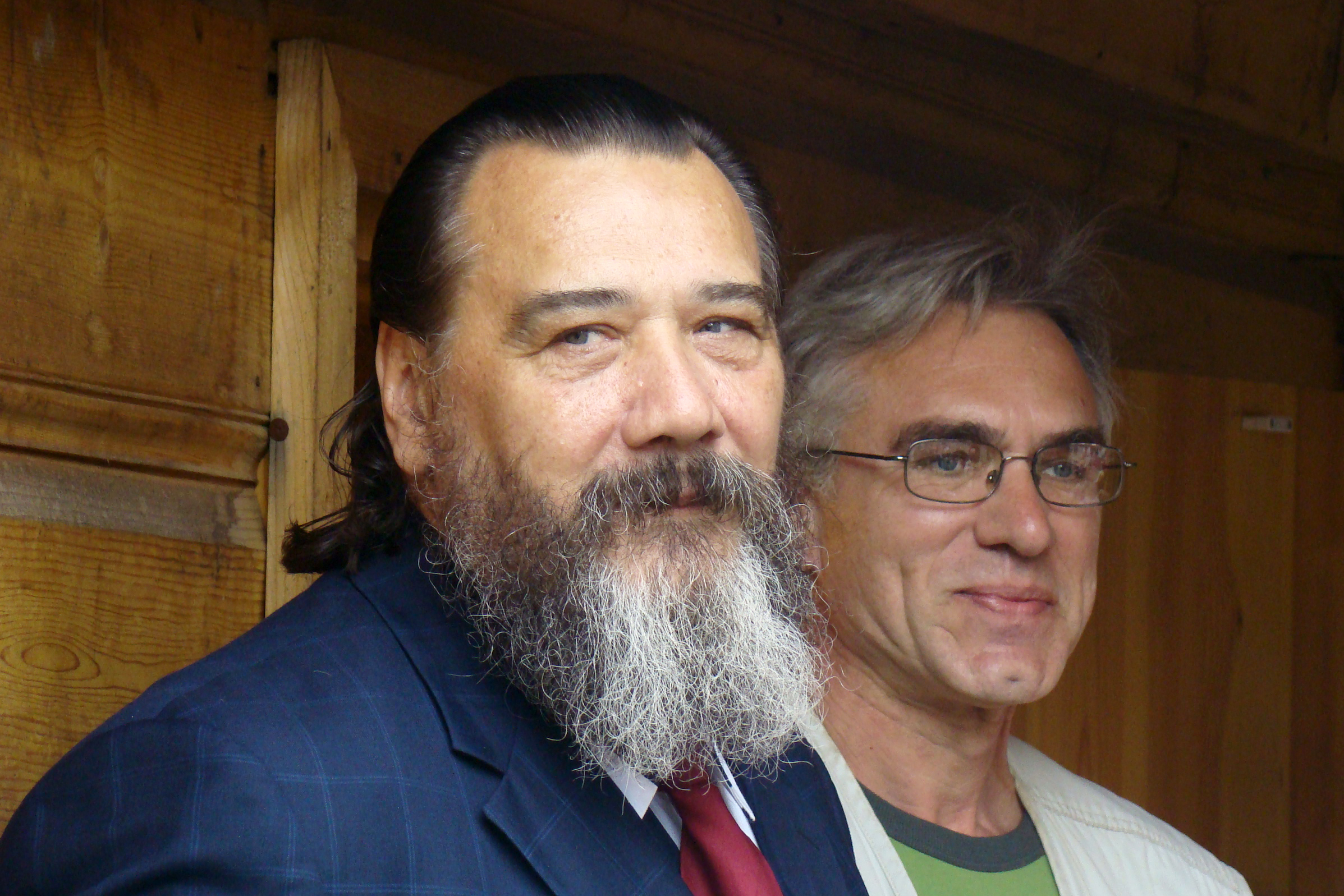

Vladimir Anatolyevich Matorin (Russian: Влади́мир Анато́льевич Мато́рин; May 2, 1948) is a famous Russian opera singer. He is considered one of the greatest contemporary bass singers in Russia.

== Biography ==
Vladimir was born May 2, 1948, in Moscow, Russia. After graduation from Gnessin music academy he became a part of the Stanislavsky and Nemirovich-Danchenko Moscow Academic Music Theatre in 1974. In 1991 he was invited to the Bolshoi Theatre troupe. He performed the major parts in such operas as Boris Godunov, Khovanshchina, Aleko and others.

== Honours and awards ==
- Order of Merit for the Fatherland;
  - 3rd class (29 April 29, 2008) - for outstanding contribution to the development of national music and many years of creative activity
  - 4th class (22 March 2001) - for outstanding contribution to the development of national music and theatre
- People's Artist of Russia (1997)
- International Competition for musicians in Geneva, II Prize (1973)
- All-Union competition of vocalists named after M. Glinka, II Prize (1977)

== Bibliography ==
- Russian Musical Newspaper Культура No.10 (7623) 13-19 марта 2008 г. Владимир Маторин: «Я для вас — способ быть добрее»
