= Chandos Records =

British classical label

- Founded: 1979
- Founder: Brian Couzens
- Genre: Classical
- Country of origin: United Kingdom
- Location: Colchester
- Official website: www.chandos.net

Chandos Records is a British independent classical music recording company based in Colchester. It was founded in 1979 by Brian Couzens. Since March 2024, it has been owned by Klaus Heymann.

== Background ==
Chandos Records arose from a band music publisher Chandos Music, founded in 1963, and Chandos Productions, a record production company which produced LPs for Classics for Pleasure, and, especially, RCA's work in the UK. Its first record was Bloch's Sacred Service (ABR1001). Important early recordings were made with Mariss Jansons, Nigel Kennedy and the King's Singers – before they moved to bigger contracts with EMI.

In 2005, Chandos Records was the first classical label to offer mp3s on its website. They now run The Classical Shop with over 45 labels on offer, including Naxos, LSO Live, Coro, Avie, Onyx, Alpha and many rarer European labels, which are not available in physical format in the UK.

The name "Chandos" refers to James Brydges, 1st Duke of Chandos (1674–1744), at whose Palladian-style house, Cannons, the composer Handel was engaged as a composer-in-residence for a year (1717–1718). In addition to the eleven Chandos Anthems, Handel also wrote other works, including Acis and Galatea, at Cannons. The company originally had its office in Chandos House, on Chandos Street, in Marylebone the street name derived from the Duke.

== Repertoire ==
The Chandos catalogue contains a range of classical music – for example, much orchestral, choral and chamber music by such lesser-known British composers as Herbert Howells, Gerald Finzi, Charles Villiers Stanford and Arnold Bax, conducted by eminent conductors including Richard Hickox, Gianandrea Noseda, Neeme Järvi and Vernon Handley. They also specialise in early music, on their label Chaconne, with performances by artists such as the Purcell Quartet, Collegium Musicum 90 and Sophie Yates. Chandos is also known for its Movies series, preserving previously lost film scores. In 1990 they launched the Opera in English label, in association with the Peter Moores Foundation, which has resulted in over 80 recordings.

Series include:

- Complete symphonies of Alwyn, Vaughan Williams, Mahler, Arnold, Shostakovich, Bax
- Tone poems of Liszt
- Film Music series includes: Arnold, Shostakovich, Vaughan Willams, Bax, Korngold, Coates, Addinsell, Addison

== Awards ==
Recordings released by Chandos have won many awards including "Gramophone Record of the Year" for Vaughan Williams's A London Symphony with the London Symphony Orchestra, and "Gramophone Choral Recording of the Year" for Hummel Masses. Chandos recordings have received five Grammy Awards: "Best Opera Recording" in 1997 for Britten's Peter Grimes and in 2008 for Engelbert Humperdinck's Hansel and Gretel, "Best Engineered Classical Album" in 2008 for Gretchaninov's "Passion Week" and in 2013 for "Life and Breath" by the Kansas City Chorale, and "Best Choral Performance" for "Life and Breath."

== Artists ==
Soloists and conductors who have recorded for the label include Sir Charles Mackerras, Rebecca Evans, Jennifer Larmore, Julian Lloyd Webber, Sir Thomas Allen, Alan Opie, Tasmin Little, Bruce Ford, Barry Banks, Christine Brewer, Lesley Garrett, Horacio Gutiérrez, Neeme Järvi, Simon Keenlyside, Hideko Udagawa, Alexandre Naoumenko and Safri Duo.

They have recording partnerships with, among others, the BBC Philharmonic Orchestra and pianists Jean-Efflam Bavouzet and Louis Lortie. The late conductor Richard Hickox was many times a Gramophone winner with Chandos recordings.
