= Vaslovivtsi =

Commune in Chernivtsi Oblast, Ukraine

Coordinates: 48°26′48″N 25°55′48″E

Vaslovivtsi (Ukrainian: Васловівці; Romanian: Vaslăuți; German: Wasloutz) is a commune (selsoviet) in Chernivtsi Raion, Chernivtsi Oblast, Ukraine. It belongs to Horishni Sherivtsi rural hromada, one of the hromadas of Ukraine.

Until 18 July 2020, Vaslovivtsi belonged to Zastavna Raion. The raion was abolished in July 2020 as part of the administrative reform of Ukraine, which reduced the number of raions of Chernivtsi Oblast to three. The area of Zastavna Raion was merged into Chernivtsi Raion.
