= Misha Raitzin =

Ukrainian opera singer

- Born: 1930; Ukraine
- Died: May 9, 1990 (aged 59–60) New York City, United States
- Occupation: Tenor

Misha Raitzin (1930 – May 9, 1990) was a tenor with the Metropolitan Opera.

Born in Ukraine, Raitzin studied as a tenor at the Moscow Conservatory. After graduating, he rose to become a leading tenor at the Bolshoi Opera in Moscow. He also performed widely as a soloist, performing with many of the leading European orchestras. He emigrated to Israel in 1972 where he performed at the Tel Aviv Opera and with the Israel Philharmonic. He debuted with the Metropolitan Opera in 1975. He soon moved to New York and sang many leads as a member of the Metropolitan Opera Company. He was also a masterful performer of cantorial and Jewish folk music, being featured on numerous albums in both the Jewish and Operatic genres.

Misha died of a lung aneurysm on May 9, 1990, in New York City, United States.
