= Arthur Eisen =

Russian opera singer (1927–2008)

Arthur Eisen Артур Эйзен
- Eisen, in the 1980s

Background information
- Born: 8 June 1927; Moscow, Russian SFSR, Soviet Union
- Died: 26 February 2008 (aged 80) Moscow, Russia
- Genres: Classical
- Occupation: Opera singer
- Instrument: Singing

Artur Arturovich Eizen (Note: Russian: Артур Артурович Эйзен, romanized: Artur Arturovich Eyzen) (8 June 1927 – 26 February 2008), was a Soviet and Russian bass singer, actor and pedagogue. People's Artist of the USSR (1976).

== Background and training ==
Eisen was born in Moscow into a family of Latvian revolutionaries, and his family was also musical; his father was a violinist. After leaving school in 1944 he joined the Shchukin Theatre School at the Stanislavski and Nemirovich-Danchenko Moscow Academic Music Theatre. He studied with future stars, and his singing teacher had been famous in the past: N. Popovoy-Narutovich. He left college in 1948 and joined a youth literary reading group. On a performing tour in Ukraine he sang, making their tour a hit. Back in Moscow he spent a year at Gnessin State Musical College. He then attended Moscow Conservatory and in 1955, a year before graduating, he won the gold medal at the World Festival of Youth and Students in Warsaw.

== Career ==
While studying at the Moscow Conservatory Eisen became a soloist for the Alexandrov Ensemble 1949-1956. This involved lessons at the Conservatory, exams and rehearsals, performances and concert tours with the choir in the Soviet Union, foreign tours and mandatory daily rehearsals with an accompanist. He was also preparing for big solo performances at major concert halls in Moscow. He became well-known and often appeared on radio. Following this he gained fame on the international opera circuit after a successful 1956 debut as Don Basilio in The Barber of Seville. He was praised in the American, British and Japanese press. From 1956 to 1996, he was a soloist at the Bolshoi Theatre, singing major roles.

== Recordings ==
With the Alexandrov Ensemble Eisen recorded: Elegy, Oh No John (1956), Cold Waves Lapping (1956), Black Raven duet with N.A. Abramov (1956), four unknown solos (1956), The Song of the Volga Boatmen.

== Death ==
Eisen died in Moscow in 2008.
