= Rothschild's Violin =

1894 short story by Anton Chekhov

"Rothschild's Violin" (Russian: Скрипка Ротшильда, romanized: Skripka Rotshilda – also translated as "Rothschild's Fiddle") is an 1894 short story by Anton Chekhov.

== Publication ==
"Rothschild's Violin" was first published in Russkiye Vedomosti Number 37, in February 1894. In the same year it was published in the collection Novellas and Stories (Повести и рассказы).

After the idea was proposed to him by Dmitri Shostakovich, "Rothschild's Violin" was made into an opera by Veniamin Fleishman.

== Synopsis ==
Yakov Ivanov (nicknamed "Bronze") is a 70-year-old coffin maker in a small village, where there are not enough deaths for his business to flourish. To make ends meet, he plays the violin for a Jewish klezmer orchestra when called upon by its director Moisey Shahkes. Yakov is antisemitic and dislikes Jews, especially the flutist in the orchestra named Rothschild.

Yakov's wife Marfa becomes ill. Her illness makes him regret his flippant conduct, his coldness and indifference towards her. On the eve of her death, she reminds him of their shared past, but Yakov does not remember. He starts to build her coffin before she dies. Yakov eventually succumbs to illness as well. After grieving for his wife, and then facing his own mortality; Yakov's attitude changes. He eventually gives his violin to Rothschild before dying.
