= Konstantin Pluzhnikov (tenor) =

Konstantin Ilyich Pluzhnikov (Russian: Константин Ильич Плужников; born 1941) is a Russian tenor, soloist of the Kirov Opera, and Meritorious Artist of Russia. He was awarded the first prize at the Geneva International Music Competition in 1972. He is noted for his performances of roles in the operas of Rimsky-Korsakov under conductor Valery Gergiev and others. Including the title role of the wizard in the one-act opera Kashchey the Immortal and the traitor Grishka Kuterma in The Invisible City of Kitezh. Other roles include Herod in Richard Strauss' Salome.

== Discography and videography ==
- Kaschey the Immortal (DVD) VAI
