= Sergei Leiferkus =

Russian opera singer

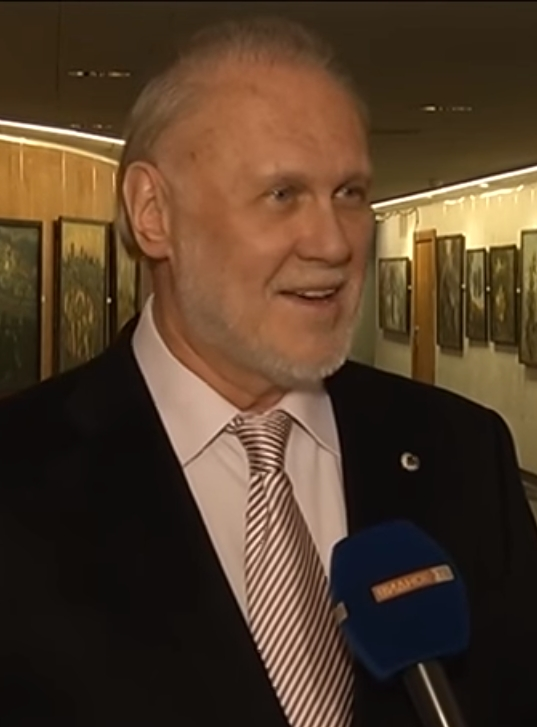
Sergei Leiferkus, Gorki Leninskiye, April 2016

Sergei Leiferkus (born 4 April 1946) is an operatic baritone from Russia, known for his dramatic technique and powerful voice particularly in Russian and Italian language repertoire. He is most notable for his roles as Scarpia in Tosca, Iago in Otello, Grand-prétre de Dagon in Samson et Dalila and Simon Boccanegra as the title role. Leiferkus was born in Leningrad (now known as St Petersburg), Russia. He studied music at the St. Petersburg conservatory.

In 1972, he made his debut with Maly Theatre of Leningrad and received recognition for Eugene Onegin, Iolanta, Barber of Seville and Don Giovanni. He joined Kirov Opera Company in 1977 performing in Prokofiev's War and Peace as Andrei. While at the Kirov Opera, Leiferkus's talent began to receive international reputation as a powerful singer and imaginative actor.

Leiferkus has toured most opera houses in the world including Royal Opera House, Vienna State Opera, Opéra Bastille in Paris, Teatro alla Scala, San Francisco Opera, Metropolitan Opera, Netherlands Opera, Teatro Colón, at the Edinburgh Festival, Bregenzer Festspiele, Glyndebourne and Salzburg Easter Festival. He has also worked with many notable conductors and orchestras including Georg Solti, James Levine, Claudio Abbado, Valery Gergiev, Bernard Haitink, Zubin Mehta, Riccardo Muti and Seiji Ozawa with London Symphony Orchestra, Boston Symphony, New York Philharmonic, Philadelphia Orchestra and Berlin Philharmonic.
