= List of The New York Times number-one books of 1972 =

This is a list of books that topped The New York Times best-seller list in 1972.

== Fiction ==
The following list ranks the number-one best-selling fiction books.

Date	Book	Author
January 2	Wheels	Arthur Hailey
January 9	Wheels	Arthur Hailey
January 16	The Winds of War	Herman Wouk
January 23	Wheels	Arthur Hailey
January 30	The Winds of War	Herman Wouk
February 6	The Winds of War	Herman Wouk
February 13	The Winds of War	Herman Wouk
February 20	The Winds of War	Herman Wouk
February 27	The Winds of War	Herman Wouk
March 5	The Winds of War	Herman Wouk
March 12	The Winds of War	Herman Wouk
March 19	The Winds of War	Herman Wouk
March 26	The Winds of War	Herman Wouk
April 2	The Winds of War	Herman Wouk
April 9	The Winds of War	Herman Wouk
April 16	The Winds of War	Herman Wouk
April 23	The Winds of War	Herman Wouk
April 30	The Winds of War	Herman Wouk
May 7	The Winds of War	Herman Wouk
May 14	The Word	Irving Wallace
May 21	The Winds of War	Herman Wouk
May 28	The Winds of War	Herman Wouk
June 4	The Word	Irving Wallace
June 11	The Winds of War	Herman Wouk
June 18	The Winds of War	Herman Wouk
June 25	The Winds of War	Herman Wouk
July 2	Jonathan Livingston Seagull	Richard Bach
July 9	Jonathan Livingston Seagull	Richard Bach
July 16	Jonathan Livingston Seagull	Richard Bach
July 23	Jonathan Livingston Seagull	Richard Bach
July 30	Jonathan Livingston Seagull	Richard Bach
August 6	Jonathan Livingston Seagull	Richard Bach
August 13	Jonathan Livingston Seagull	Richard Bach
August 20	Jonathan Livingston Seagull	Richard Bach
August 27	Jonathan Livingston Seagull	Richard Bach
September 3	Jonathan Livingston Seagull	Richard Bach
September 10	Jonathan Livingston Seagull	Richard Bach
September 17	Jonathan Livingston Seagull	Richard Bach
September 24	Jonathan Livingston Seagull	Richard Bach
October 1	Jonathan Livingston Seagull	Richard Bach
October 8	Jonathan Livingston Seagull	Richard Bach
October 15	Jonathan Livingston Seagull	Richard Bach
October 22	Jonathan Livingston Seagull	Richard Bach
October 29	Jonathan Livingston Seagull	Richard Bach
November 5	Jonathan Livingston Seagull	Richard Bach
November 12	Jonathan Livingston Seagull	Richard Bach
November 19	Jonathan Livingston Seagull	Richard Bach
November 26	Jonathan Livingston Seagull	Richard Bach
December 3	Jonathan Livingston Seagull	Richard Bach
December 10	Jonathan Livingston Seagull	Richard Bach
December 17	Jonathan Livingston Seagull	Richard Bach
December 24	Jonathan Livingston Seagull	Richard Bach
December 31	Jonathan Livingston Seagull	Richard Bach

== Nonfiction ==
The following list ranks the number-one best-selling nonfiction books.

Date	Book	Author
January 2	Eleanor and Franklin	Joseph P. Lash
January 9	Eleanor and Franklin	Joseph P. Lash
January 16	Eleanor and Franklin	Joseph P. Lash
January 23	Eleanor and Franklin	Joseph P. Lash
January 30	Eleanor and Franklin	Joseph P. Lash
February 6	Eleanor and Franklin	Joseph P. Lash
February 13	Eleanor and Franklin	Joseph P. Lash
February 20	Eleanor and Franklin	Joseph P. Lash
February 27	Eleanor and Franklin	Joseph P. Lash
March 5	Eleanor and Franklin	Joseph P. Lash
March 12	Eleanor and Franklin	Joseph P. Lash
March 19	The Game of the Foxes	Ladislas Farago
March 26	The Game of the Foxes	Ladislas Farago
April 2	The Game of the Foxes	Ladislas Farago
April 9	The Game of the Foxes	Ladislas Farago
April 16	The Game of the Foxes	Ladislas Farago
April 23	The Game of the Foxes	Ladislas Farago
April 30	The Game of the Foxes	Ladislas Farago
May 7	The Game of the Foxes	Ladislas Farago
May 14	The Game of the Foxes	Ladislas Farago
May 21	The Game of the Foxes	Ladislas Farago
May 28	The Boys of Summer	Roger Kahn
June 4	The Boys of Summer	Roger Kahn
June 11	The Boys of Summer	Roger Kahn
June 18	The Boys of Summer	Roger Kahn
June 25	I'm OK – You're OK	Thomas A. Harris
July 2	The Boys of Summer	Roger Kahn
July 9	The Boys of Summer	Roger Kahn
July 16	I'm OK – You're OK	Thomas A. Harris
July 23	O Jerusalem!	Larry Collins and Dominique Lapierre
July 30	O Jerusalem!	Larry Collins and Dominique Lapierre
August 6	I'm OK – You're OK	Thomas A. Harris
August 13	O Jerusalem!	Larry Collins and Dominique Lapierre
August 20	I'm OK – You're OK	Thomas A. Harris
August 27	O Jerusalem!	Larry Collins and Dominique Lapierre
September 3	I'm OK – You're OK	Thomas A. Harris
September 10	I'm OK – You're OK	Thomas A. Harris
September 17	I'm OK – You're OK	Thomas A. Harris
September 24	I'm OK – You're OK	Thomas A. Harris
October 1	I'm OK – You're OK	Thomas A. Harris
October 8	I'm OK – You're OK	Thomas A. Harris
October 15	I'm OK – You're OK	Thomas A. Harris
October 22	I'm OK – You're OK	Thomas A. Harris
October 29	I'm OK – You're OK	Thomas A. Harris
November 5	I'm OK – You're OK	Thomas A. Harris
November 12	I'm OK – You're OK	Thomas A. Harris
November 19	I'm OK – You're OK	Thomas A. Harris
November 26	I'm OK – You're OK	Thomas A. Harris
December 3	I'm OK – You're OK	Thomas A. Harris
December 10	I'm OK – You're OK	Thomas A. Harris
December 17	I'm OK – You're OK	Thomas A. Harris
December 24	I'm OK – You're OK	Thomas A. Harris
December 31	I'm OK – You're OK	Thomas A. Harris

== See also ==
- Publishers Weekly list of bestselling novels in the United States in the 1970s
