= Independence Day (India) =

Public holiday celebrated on 15 August

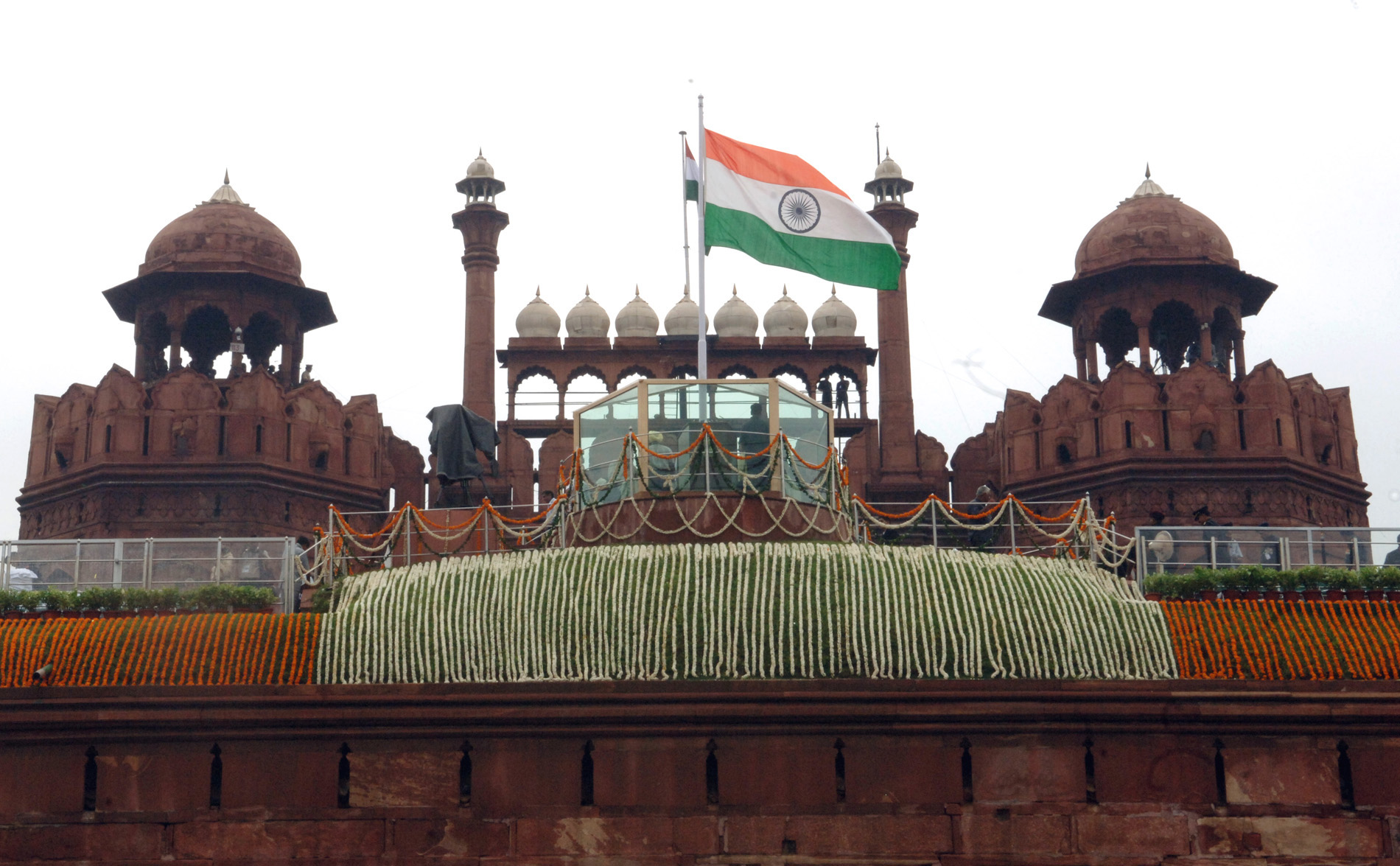
- The flag of India hoisted at Delhi's Red Fort, from where conventionally the Prime Minister addresses the nation on the Independence day; hoisted flags are a common sight that day.
- Observed by: India
- Type: Public
- Significance: Commemorates the independence of India
- Celebrations: Flag hoisting, parade, fireworks, singing patriotic songs and the National Anthem Jana Gana Mana, speech by the Prime Minister of India and the President of India
- Date: 15 August
- Next time: 15 August 2027
- Duration: 24 hours
- Frequency: Annual
- First time: 15 August 1947 (79 years ago)
- Related to: Republic Day

Independence Day is celebrated annually on 15 August as a public holiday in India commemorating the nation's independence from the United Kingdom on 15 August 1947. On this day the Indian Independence Act 1947 came into effect, transferring legislative sovereignty to the Indian Constituent Assembly. India attained independence following the independence movement noted for largely non-violent resistance and civil disobedience led by the Indian National Congress under the leadership of Mahatma Gandhi.

Independence coincided with the partition of India, in which British India was divided into the Dominions of India and Pakistan; the partition was accompanied by violent riots and mass casualties. On 15 August 1947, the first Prime Minister of India, Jawaharlal Nehru raised the Indian national flag above the Lahori Gate of the Red Fort in Delhi. On each subsequent Independence Day, the incumbent Prime Minister customarily raises the flag and gives an address to the nation. The entire event is broadcast by Doordarshan, India's national broadcaster. Independence Day is observed throughout India with flag-hoisting ceremonies, parades and cultural events. It is a national holiday in the country.

== History ==
European traders had established outposts in the Indian subcontinent by the late 17th century. Through overwhelming military strength, the East India Company fought and annexed local kingdoms and established themselves as the dominant force by the 18th century. Following the Indian Rebellion of 1857, the Government of India Act 1858 led the British Crown to assume direct control of India. In the decades following, civic society gradually emerged across India, most notably the Indian National Congress Party, formed in 1885. The period after World War I was marked by colonial reforms such as the Montagu–Chelmsford Reforms, but it also witnessed the enactment of the unpopular Rowlatt Act and calls for self-rule by Indian activists. The discontent of this period crystallised into nationwide non-violent movements of non-cooperation and civil disobedience, led by Mahatma Gandhi.

During the 1930s, the reform was gradually legislated by the British; Congress won victories in the resulting elections. The next decade was beset with political turmoil: Indian participation in World War II, the Congress' final push for non-cooperation, and an upsurge of Muslim nationalism led by the All-India Muslim League. The escalating political tension was capped by Independence in 1947. The jubilation was tempered by the bloody partition of colonial India into India and Pakistan.

=== Independence Day before Independence ===
Hasrat Mohani was the first person in Indian history who demanded 'Complete Independence' (Azadi-e-Kaamil), at the 1929 session of the Indian National Congress, the Purna Swaraj declaration, or "Declaration of the Independence of India" was promulgated, and 26 January was declared as Independence Day in 1930. The Congress called on people to pledge themselves to civil disobedience and "to carry out the Congress instructions issued from time to time" until India attained complete independence. Celebration of such an Independence Day was envisioned to stoke nationalistic fervour among Indian citizens, and to force the British government to consider granting independence. The Congress observed 26 January as the Independence Day between 1930 and 1946. The celebration was marked by meetings where the attendants took the "pledge of independence". Jawaharlal Nehru described in his autobiography that such meetings were peaceful, solemn, and "without any speeches or exhortation". Gandhi envisaged that besides the meetings, the day would be spent " ... in doing some constructive work, whether it is spinning, or service of 'untouchables,' or reunion of Hindus and Mussalmans, or prohibition work, or even all these together". Following actual independence in 1947, the Constitution of India came into effect on and from 26 January 1950; since then 26 January is celebrated as Republic Day.

=== Immediate background ===
In 1946, the Labour government in Britain, its exchequer exhausted by the recently concluded World War II, realised that it had neither the mandate at home, the international support nor the reliability of native forces for continuing to maintain control in an increasingly restless India. On 20 February 1947, Prime Minister Clement Attlee announced that the British government would grant full self-governance to British India by June 1948 at the latest.

The new viceroy, Lord Mountbatten, advanced the date for the transfer of power, believing the continuous contention between the Congress and the Muslim League might lead to a collapse of the interim government. He chose the second anniversary of Japan's surrender in World War II, 15 August, as the date of power transfer. The British government announced on 3 June 1947 that it had accepted the idea of partitioning British India into two states; the successor governments would be given dominion status and would have an implicit right to secede from the British Commonwealth. The Indian Independence Act 1947 (10 & 11 Geo 6 c. 30) of the Parliament of the United Kingdom partitioned British India into the two new independent dominions of India and Pakistan (including what is now Bangladesh) with effect from 15 August 1947, and granted complete legislative authority upon the respective constituent assemblies of the new countries. The Act received royal assent on 18 July 1947.

=== Partition and independence ===
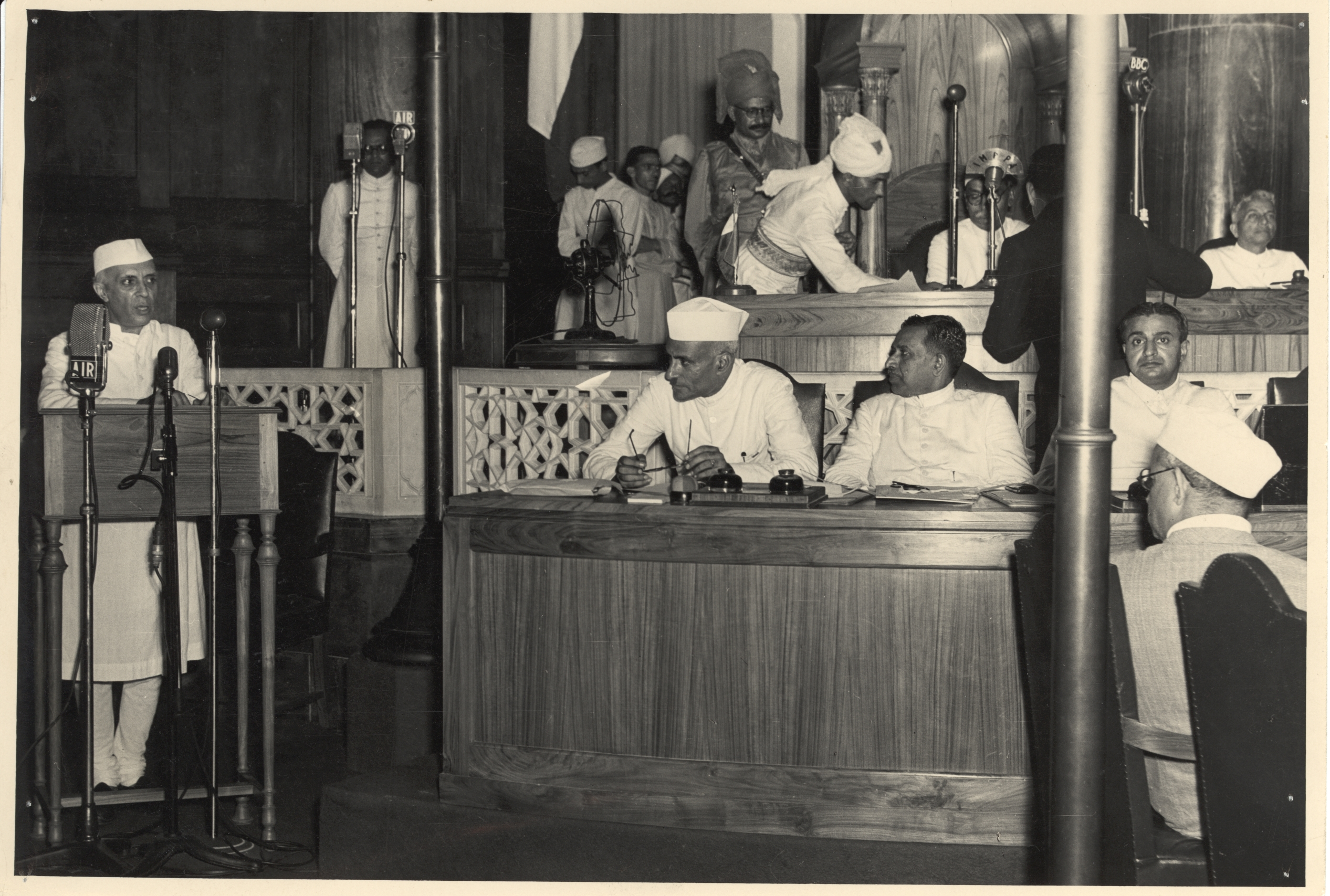
Jawaharlal Nehru delivering his speech, Tryst with Destiny, on the eve of India's first independence day.

Millions of Muslim, Sikh and Hindu refugees trekked the newly drawn borders in the months surrounding independence. In Punjab, where the borders divided the Sikh regions in halves, massive bloodshed followed; in Bengal and Bihar, where Mahatma Gandhi's presence assuaged communal tempers, the violence was mitigated. In all, between 250,000 and 1,000,000 people on both sides of the new borders died in the violence. While the entire nation was celebrating the Independence Day, Gandhi stayed in Calcutta in an attempt to stem the carnage. On 14 August 1947, the Independence Day of Pakistan, the new Dominion of Pakistan came into being; Muhammad Ali Jinnah was sworn in as its first Governor General in Karachi.

The Constituent Assembly of India met for its fifth session at 11 pm on 14 August in the Constitution Hall in New Delhi. The session was chaired by the president Rajendra Prasad. In this session, Jawaharlal Nehru delivered the Tryst with Destiny speech proclaiming India's independence.

Long years ago we made a tryst with destiny, and now the time comes when we shall redeem our pledge, not wholly or in full measure, but very substantially. At the stroke of the midnight hour, when the world sleeps, India will awake to life and freedom. A moment comes, which comes but rarely in history when we step out from the old to the new when an age ends, and when the soul of a nation, long suppressed, finds utterance. It is fitting that at this solemn moment, we take the pledge of dedication to the service of India and her people and to the still larger cause of humanity.

— Tryst with Destiny speech, Jawaharlal Nehru, 15 August 1947

The members of the Assembly formally took the pledge of being in the service of the country. A group of women, representing the women of India, formally presented the national flag to the assembly.

The Dominion of India became an independent country as official ceremonies took place in New Delhi. Nehru assumed office as the first prime minister, and the viceroy, Lord Mountbatten, continued as its first governor general. Gandhi's name was invoked by crowds celebrating the occasion; Gandhi himself however took no part in the official events. Instead, he marked the day with a 24-hour fast, during which he spoke to a crowd in Calcutta, encouraging peace between Hindus and Muslims.

== Celebration ==
08.30 am. Swearing in of governor general and ministers at
Government House
09.40 am. Procession of ministers to Constituent Assembly
09.50 am. State drive to Constituent Assembly
09.55 am. Royal salute to governor general
10.30 am. Hoisting of national flag at Constituent Assembly
10.35 am. State drive to Government House
06.00 pm. Flag ceremony at India Gate
07.00 pm. Illuminations
07.45 pm. Fireworks display
08.45 pm. Official dinner at Government House
10.15 pm. Reception at Government office.

— The day's programme for 15 August 1947

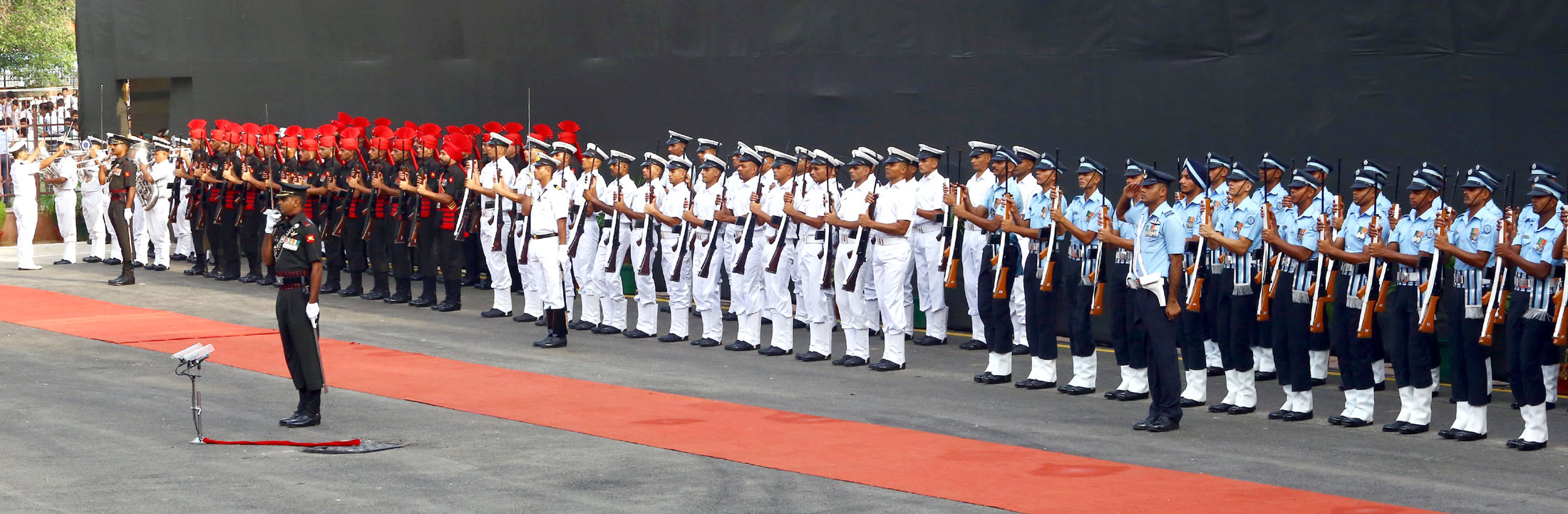
Armed forces saluting the national flag

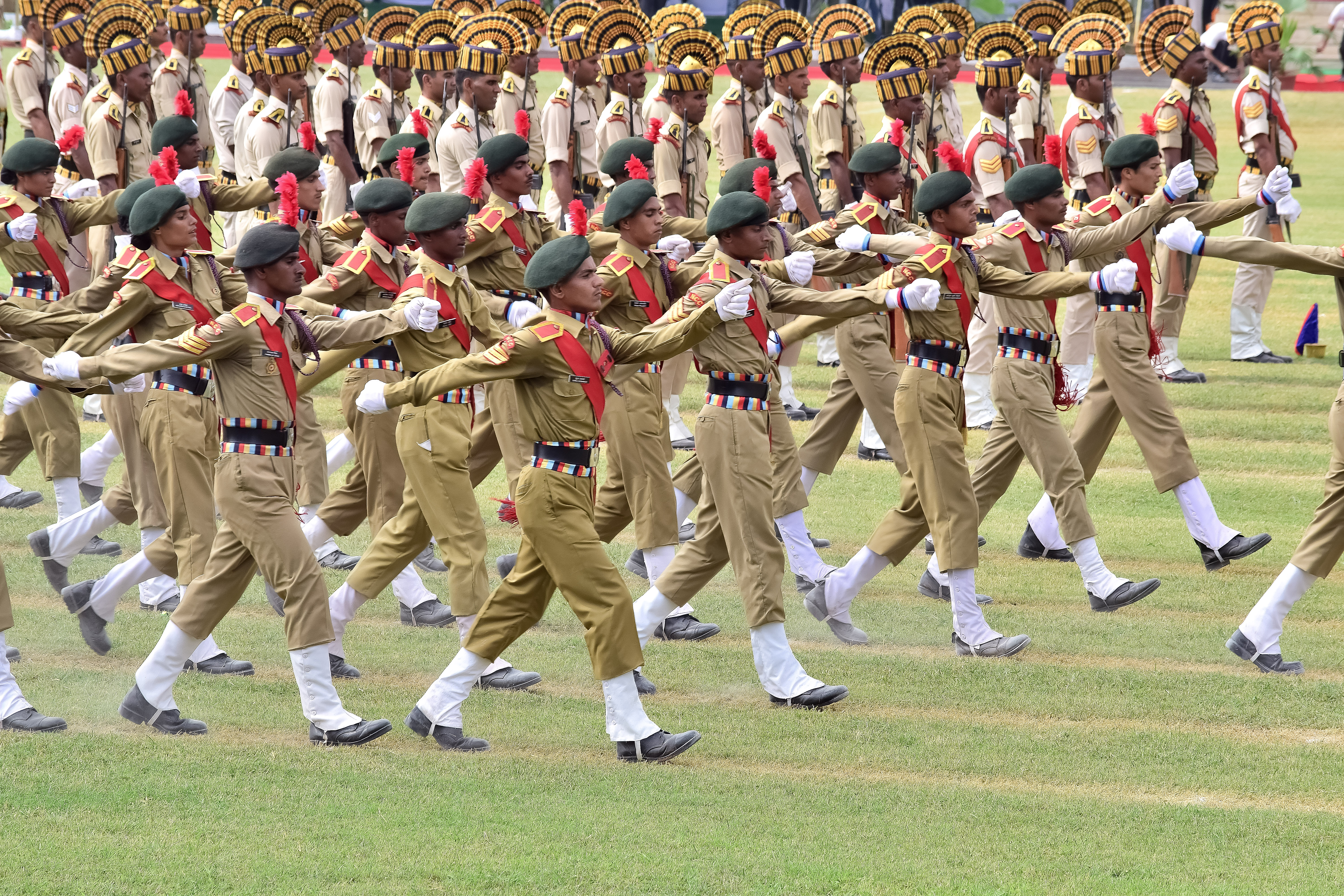
Parade on independence day

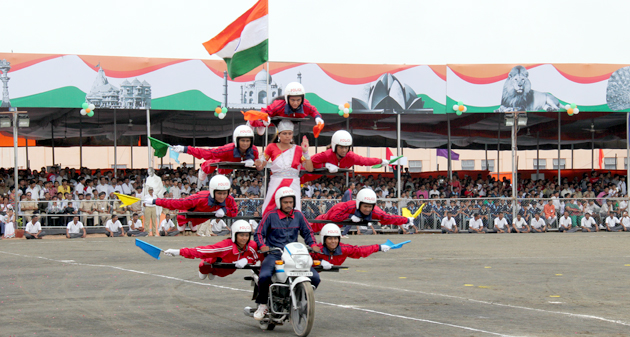
Motor cycle stunts on Independence day

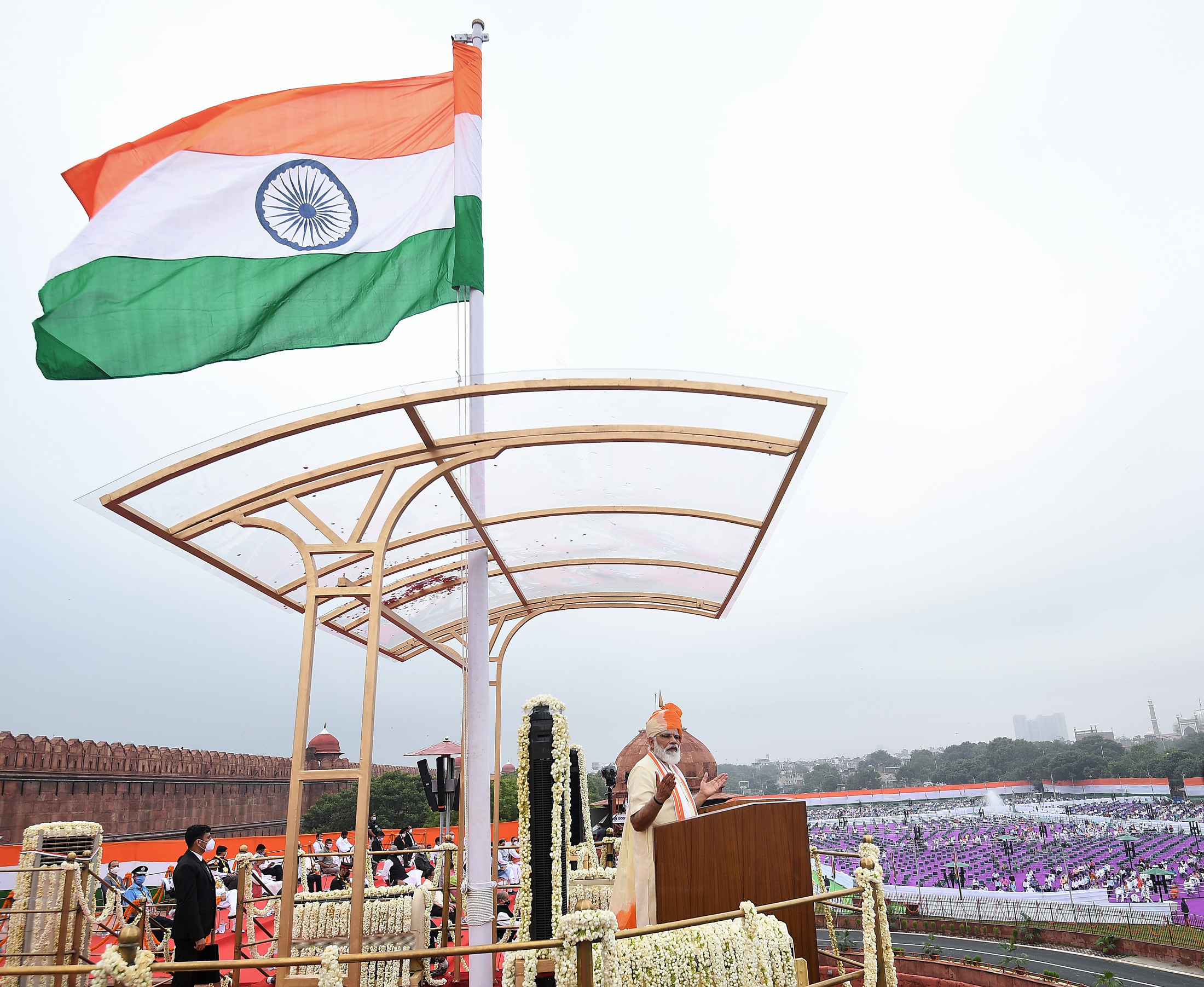
Prime Minister Narendra Modi addressing the Nation on the occasion of 74th Independence Day from the ramparts of Red Fort, in Delhi on 15 August 2020.

Independence Day, one of the three National holidays in India (the other two being the Republic Day on 26 January and Mahatma Gandhi's birthday on 2 October), is observed in all Indian states and union territories. On the eve of Independence Day, the President of India delivers the "Address to the Nation". On 15 August, the Prime Minister hoists the Indian flag on the ramparts of the historical site of Red Fort in Delhi. In his speech, the Prime Minister highlights the past year's achievements, raises important issues and calls for further development. He pays tribute to the leaders of the Indian independence movement. The Indian national anthem, "Jana Gana Mana", is sung. The speech is followed by a march past of divisions of the Indian Armed Forces and paramilitary forces. Parades and pageants showcase scenes from the independence struggle and India's diverse cultural traditions. Similar events take place in state capitals where the Chief Ministers of individual states unfurl the national flag, followed by parades and pageants. Until 1973, the Governor of the State hoisted the National Flag at the State capital. In February 1974, the Chief Minister of Tamil Nadu, M. Karunanidhi took up the issue with then Prime Minister Indira Gandhi that the Chief Ministers, like the Prime Minister, should be allowed to hoist the national flag on Independence Day. Since 1974, Chief Ministers of the respective states have been allowed to hoist the national flag on Independence Day.

Flag-hoisting ceremonies and cultural programmes take place in governmental and non-governmental institutions throughout the country. Schools and colleges conduct flag hoisting ceremonies and various cultural events. Governmental and non-governmental institutions decorate their premises with paper, balloon decorations with hangings of freedom fighter portraits on their walls and major government buildings are often adorned with strings of lights. In Delhi and some other cities, kite flying adds to the occasion. National flags of different sizes are used abundantly to symbolise allegiance to the country. Citizens adorn their clothing, wristbands, cars, household accessories with replicas of the tri-colour. Over a period of time, the celebration has changed emphasis from nationalism to a broader celebration of all things India.

In some places of Nadia, West Bengal, Independence Day is celebrated on 17–18 August instead of 15 August, as the rest of Nadia district except Nabadwip had become part of Pakistan due to a map drawing error. The error was corrected on the night of 17 August after popular protests.

The Indian diaspora celebrates Independence Day around the world with parades and pageants, particularly in regions with higher concentrations of Indian immigrants. In some locations, such as New York and other US cities, 15 August has become "India Day" among the diaspora and the local populace. Pageants celebrate "India Day" either on 15 August or an adjoining weekend day.

== Security threats ==
As early as three years after independence, the Naga National Council called for a boycott of Independence Day in northeast India. Separatist protests in this region intensified in the 1980s; calls for boycotts and terrorist attacks by insurgent organisations such as the United Liberation Front of Assam and the National Democratic Front of Bodoland, marred celebrations. With increasing insurgency in Jammu and Kashmir from the late 1980s, separatist protesters boycotted Independence Day there with bandh (strikes), use of black flags and by flag burning. Terrorist groups such as Lashkar-e-Taiba, the Hizbul Mujahideen and the Jaish-e-Mohammed have issued threats, and have carried out attacks around Independence Day. Boycotting of the celebration has also been advocated by insurgent Maoist rebel organisations.

In the anticipation of terrorist attacks, particularly from militants, security measures are intensified, especially in major cities such as Delhi and Mumbai and in troubled states such as Jammu and Kashmir. The airspace around the Red Fort is declared a no-fly zone to prevent aerial attacks and additional police forces are deployed in other cities.

Since the assassination of Indira Gandhi, prime ministers would give their speeches from behind a bullet-proof glass panel. Since 2014, when Narendra Modi was elected as prime minister, he did away with this tradition. Nevertheless, additional intense measures were taken to ensure security of Modi.

== In popular culture ==
On Independence Day and Republic Day, patriotic songs in regional languages are broadcast on television and radio channels. They are also played alongside flag-hoisting ceremonies. Patriotic films are broadcast. Over the decades, according to The Times of India, the number of such films broadcast has decreased as channels report that audiences are oversaturated with patriotic films. The population belonging to Generation Y often combine nationalism with popular culture during the celebrations. This mixture is exemplified by outfits and savouries dyed with the tricolour and garments that represent India's various cultural traditions. Shops often offer Independence Day sales promotions. Some news reports have decried the commercialism. Indian Postal Service publishes commemorative stamps depicting independence movement leaders, nationalistic themes and defence-related themes on 15 August.

Independence and partition inspired literary and other artistic creations. Such creations mostly describe the human cost of partition, limiting the holiday to a small part of their narrative. Salman Rushdie's novel Midnight's Children (1980), which won the Booker Prize and the Booker of Bookers, wove its narrative around children born at midnight of 14–15 August 1947 with magical abilities. Freedom at Midnight (1975) is a non-fiction work by Larry Collins and Dominique Lapierre that chronicled the events surrounding the first Independence Day celebrations in 1947. Few films centre on the moment of independence, instead highlighting the circumstances of partition and its aftermath. On the Internet, Google has been commemorating Independence Day of India since 2003 with a special doodle on its Indian homepage.

== See also ==
- 75th Anniversary of Indian Independence – Celebration on 15 August 2022
- History of India
- Indian Independence Day Parade – Annual parade in New York City, US
- Partition Horrors Remembrance Day – Partition of India memorial on 14 August
