= O Jerusalem (disambiguation) =

O Jerusalem! is a 1972 book by Dominique Lapierre and Larry Collins about the creation of the state of Israel.

O Jerusalem may also refer to:

- O Jerusalem (film), a 2006 film directed by Elie Chouraqui
- O Jerusalem (novel), a Mary Russell novel by Laurie R. King
- O Jerusalem, a play by A. R. Gurney
- O Jerusalem aurea civitatis, sequence to St Rupert by Hildegard von Bingen
