= Freedom at Midnight (TV series) =

Indian historical drama television series

- Promotional poster
- Genre: Historical drama
- Created by: Nikkhil Advani
- Based on: Freedom at Midnight by Dominique Lapierre and Larry Collins
- Written by: Abhinandan Gupta; Gundeep Kaur; Adwitiya Kareng Das; Divy Nidhi Sharma; Revanta Sarabhai; Ethan Taylor
- Directed by: Nikkhil Advani
- Starring: Sidhant Gupta; Chirag Vohra; Rajendra Chawla; Luke McGibney; Cordelia Bugeja; Malishka Mendonsa; Arif Zakaria; Ira Dubey
- Music by: Ashutosh Phatak
- Country of origin: India
- Original language: Hindi
- No. of seasons: 2
- No. of episodes: 14

Production
- Producers: Monisha Advani; Madhu Bhojwani
- Cinematography: Malay Prakash
- Editor: Shweta Venkat
- Running time: 37–48 minutes
- Production companies: Studio Next; Emmay Entertainment

Original release
- Network: SonyLIV
- Release: 15 November 2024 – 9 January 2026

Freedom at Midnight is a 2024 Indian Hindi-language historical drama web series streaming on Sony LIV, adapted from the book of the same name, authored by Dominique Lapierre and Larry Collins. Created and directed by Nikkhil Advani, the series delves into the 1947 partition of India.

The first season was released on 15 November 2024, and a second season was announced later that month.

== Cast and characters ==
- Sidhant Gupta as Jawaharlal Nehru
- Chirag Vohra as Mahatma Gandhi
- Rajendra Chawla as Sardar Vallabhbhai Patel
- Luke McGibney as Lord Mountbatten
- Cordelia Bugeja as Edwina Mountbatten
- Malishka Mendonsa as Sarojini Naidu
- Arif Zakaria as Mohammad Ali Jinnah
- Pawan Chopra as Maulana Abul Kalam Azad
- Ira Dubey as Fatima Jinnah
- Rajesh Kumar as Liaquat Ali Khan
- K.C. Shankar as V.P. Menon
- Andrew Cullum as Clement Attlee
- Alistair Findlay as Archibald Wavell
- Ed Robinson as George Abell
- Richard Madison as Hastings Ismay
- Richard Teverson as Sir Cyril Radcliffe
- Ahalya Shetty as Indira Gandhi
- Guy Pinsent as King George VI
- Anuvab Pal as Huseyn Shaheed Suhrawardy
- Simon Feilder as Evan Meredith Jenkins
- Richard Teverson as Cyril Radcliffe (season 2)
- Kaizaad Kotwal as Hari Singh (season 2)
- Anurag Thakur as Madanlal Pahwa (season 2)
- Abhishek Banerjee as Hindu Mob Leader

== Episodes ==
Series	Episodes	Originally released	
Series	Episodes	First released	Last released
1	7	15 November 2024	15 November 2024
2	7	9 January 2026	9 January 2026

=== Season 1 ===
No.	Title	Directed by	Written by	Original release date	Length (Minutes)
1	"Direct Action"	Nikkhil Advani	Abhinandan Gupta, Gundeep Kaur, Adwitiya Kareng Das, Divy Nidhi Sharma, Revanta Sarabhai, Ethan Taylor	15 November 2024	41 Minutes
2	"Sole Spokesman"	Nikkhil Advani	Abhinandan Gupta, Gundeep Kaur, Adwitiya Kareng Das, Divy Nidhi Sharma, Revanta Sarabhai, Ethan Taylor	15 November 2024	43 Minutes
3	"Satyagraha"	Nikkhil Advani	Abhinandan Gupta, Gundeep Kaur, Adwitiya Kareng Das, Divy Nidhi Sharma, Revanta Sarabhai, Ethan Taylor	15 November 2024	48 Minutes
4	"Punjab"	Nikkhil Advani	Abhinandan Gupta, Gundeep Kaur, Adwitiya Kareng Das, Divy Nidhi Sharma, Revanta Sarabhai, Ethan Taylor	15 November 2024	37 Minutes
5	"The Last Straw"	Nikkhil Advani	Abhinandan Gupta, Gundeep Kaur, Adwitiya Kareng Das, Divy Nidhi Sharma, Revanta Sarabhai, Ethan Taylor	15 November 2024	46 Minutes
6	"Poorna Swaraj"	Nikkhil Advani	Abhinandan Gupta, Gundeep Kaur, Adwitiya Kareng Das, Divy Nidhi Sharma, Revanta Sarabhai, Ethan Taylor	15 November 2024	46 Minutes
7	"Eclipse"	Nikkhil Advani	Abhinandan Gupta, Gundeep Kaur, Adwitiya Kareng Das, Divy Nidhi Sharma, Revanta Sarabhai, Ethan Taylor	15 November 2024	43 Minutes

=== Season 2 ===
No.	Title	Directed by	Written by	Original release date	Length (Minutes)
1	"Borders of Blood"	Nikkhil Advani	Abhinandan Gupta, Gundeep Kaur, Adwitiya Kareng Das, Divy Nidhi Sharma, Revanta Sarabhai, Ethan Taylor	9 January 2026	51 Minutes
2	"Tryst with Destiny"	Nikkhil Advani	Abhinandan Gupta, Gundeep Kaur, Adwitiya Kareng Das, Divy Nidhi Sharma, Revanta Sarabhai, Ethan Taylor	9 January 2026	49 Minutes
3	"Exodus"	Nikkhil Advani	Abhinandan Gupta, Gundeep Kaur, Adwitiya Kareng Das, Divy Nidhi Sharma, Revanta Sarabhai, Ethan Taylor	9 January 2026	60 Minutes
4	"Basket of Apples"	Nikkhil Advani	Abhinandan Gupta, Gundeep Kaur, Adwitiya Kareng Das, Divy Nidhi Sharma, Revanta Sarabhai, Ethan Taylor	9 January 2026	45 Minutes
5	"Kashmir"	Nikkhil Advani	Abhinandan Gupta, Gundeep Kaur, Adwitiya Kareng Das, Divy Nidhi Sharma, Revanta Sarabhai, Ethan Taylor	9 January 2026	45 Minutes
6	"The Last Fast"	Nikkhil Advani	Abhinandan Gupta, Gundeep Kaur, Adwitiya Kareng Das, Divy Nidhi Sharma, Revanta Sarabhai, Ethan Taylor	9 January 2026	60 Minutes
7	"Hey Ram!"	Nikkhil Advani	Abhinandan Gupta, Gundeep Kaur, Adwitiya Kareng Das, Divy Nidhi Sharma, Revanta Sarabhai, Ethan Taylor	9 January 2026	54 Minutes

== Release ==
The first teaser for Freedom at Midnight was released on 30 July 2024.

== Reception ==
=== Season 1 ===
NDTV's Saibal Chatterjee gave the show 4 stars out of 5 and praised the acting, saying, "Freedom at Midnight isn't driven by A-list stars but by actors who painstakingly and confidently flesh out the towering historical figures". Shubhra Gupta of The Indian Express rated it 2.5 stars and said that "...sprawling yet pacy, the Nikkhil Advani series brings to life the story of India and Pakistan, which came into existence at that stroke of the midnight hour immortalised in the haunting words of Nehru." Arushi Jain of India Today gave it 4 stars out of 5 and observed that "The Nikkhil Advani show has a light, easygoing way of telling the story, weaving together different threads that build up quietly. The dialogues and performances strike emotional chords effectively." Nandini Ramnath of Scroll.in wrote in her review that "Freedom at Midnight doesn't want to be a show that you curl up to watch on Independence Day, a flag by your side and happiness in your heart. Rather than pride about the struggle that led to the end of British rule in 1947." Devansh Sharma of Hindustan Times wrote that "Nikkhil Advani's period drama captures the road to India's Independence and Partition and the sprawling, layered show is India's answer to The Crown." Firstpost's Vinamra Mathur stated that "As much as the filmmaker should be lauded for stepping away from the world of big stars, the ensemble he has created for his show are both hit and miss".

=== Season 2 ===
Shubhra Gupta of The Indian Express gave the show 3.5 stars out of 5, writing, "I was riveted in this season of Freedom at Midnight, which manages to sustain its tone — as serious as befits the subject without getting all heavy about it, lacing it with a degree of levity — and it will be one of my favourites this year, which has just about begun." Radhika Sharma of NDTV gave it 4 stars out of 5 and said, "The second season of the Sony LIV series [sic] as intricate as the first one and pretty much bingeable." Deepa Gahlot of Rediff.com rated it 3/5 and observed that "Whether Freedom at Midnight 2 has a political agenda, a bias or two will be read into it, depending on the affiliation of who is watching." Rahul Desai of The Hollywood Reporter India stated that "The second season of Nikkhil Advani's ambitious dive into Partition-era politics is bigger, smarter, fuller and fuelled by a terrific cast." Abhimanyu Mathur of Hindustan Times gave it 4 stars out of 5 and said that "Freedom at Midnight's victory lies in its ability to present this as a human drama, instead of a historical epic. The stakes are high, but our focus always remains on what those stakes mean for our protagonists, not the nation at large." Anuj Kumar of The Hindu observed that the show is "Intense, reflective, but selective in its depiction of events and agent provocateurs, the series humanises political icons and puts their era-defining decisions in perspective."
