= Viceroy's House (film) =

2017 fictional drama film

- British poster
- Directed by: Gurinder Chadha
- Written by: Paul Mayeda Berges; Moira Buffini; Gurinder Chadha
- Based on: Freedom at Midnight by Larry Collins and Dominique Lapierre and The Shadow of the Great Game: The Untold Story of India's Partition by Narendra Singh Sarila
- Produced by: Paul Mayeda Berges; Gurinder Chadha; Deepak Nayar
- Starring: Hugh Bonneville; Gillian Anderson; Manish Dayal; Huma Qureshi; David Hayman; Michael Gambon
- Cinematography: Ben Smithard
- Edited by: Victoria Boydell
- Music by: A. R. Rahman
- Production companies: Pathé; Reliance Entertainment; BBC Films; Ingenious Media; British Film Institute; Bend It Films
- Distributed by: 20th Century Fox (United Kingdom); Reliance Entertainment (India)
- Release dates: 12 February 2017 (67th Berlin International Film Festival); 3 March 2017 (United Kingdom); 18 August 2017 (India)
- Running time: 106 minutes
- Countries: India; United Kingdom; Sweden
- Languages: English; Hindi
- Budget: $8.5 million
- Box office: $11.8 million

Viceroy's House is a 2017 historical drama film directed by Gurinder Chadha and written by Paul Mayeda Berges, Moira Buffini, and Chadha. The film stars Hugh Bonneville, Gillian Anderson, Manish Dayal, Huma Qureshi, and Michael Gambon. It was selected to be screened out of competition at the 67th Berlin International Film Festival.

The film was released in the United Kingdom on 3 March 2017, while the Hindi dubbed version titled Partition: 1947 was released in India on 18 August 2017, three days after its 70th Independence Day. It was released worldwide on 1 September 2017. Viceroy's House is based on Freedom at Midnight by Larry Collins and Dominique Lapierre, and The Shadow of the Great Game: The Untold Story of Partition by Narendra Singh Sarila.

== Plot ==
Lord Dickie Mountbatten arrives at Viceroy's House in New Delhi in 1947 with his strong-willed wife Edwina and daughter Pamela. As the final Viceroy of India, he is in charge of overseeing the dissolution of the British Raj and the establishment of an independent Indian nation. Mountbatten attempts to mediate a disagreement between the two major Indian political leaders, Jawaharlal Nehru, who wants India to remain intact as one nation after independence, and Muhammad Ali Jinnah, who wishes to establish the separate Muslim state of Pakistan. Meanwhile, Mountbatten's newly arrived valet Jeet encounters the beautiful Alia, whom he had fallen in love with previously. Alia continues to spurn Jeet because he is Sikh and she Muslim; she fears that she will disappoint her invalid father Ali, whom Jeet had helped during a spell of imprisonment at British hands.

With riots erupting across India, their few non-Indian troops thinly spread and the loyalties of their Indian troops conflicted between Sikh, Muslim and Hindu, the British decide to accelerate the independence process. Initially influenced by Gandhi, Mountbatten is intent upon a one-state solution, but with intensifying violence between Muslims and Hindus he reluctantly accepts the Partition of India. He is given only a couple months to carve out a separate state from the existing territory, with the help of an English King's Counsel, Cyril Radcliffe, who had no experience of India.

Jeet continues to pursue Alia, despite the fact that she has been betrothed since childhood to another man, and like the other servants at Viceroy's House they are forced to choose between staying in India or going to Pakistan. Mountbatten is enraged to find that his Chief of Staff Lord Ismay has been working covertly to draw the boundaries of Pakistan in order to create a buffer state between the Indian subcontinent and the Soviet Union and to allay fears that a socialist-leaning united India would give the Soviets access to the warm water port at Karachi. He realizes that he has been used as a pawn and the displacement of millions of people will result.

Jeet is devastated to learn meanwhile that his entire family has been slaughtered in Punjab. Although Alia rejects her fiancé when he returns to claim her, she chooses to depart for Pakistan with her father. Days later Jeet reads in the newspaper that the night train she had boarded was attacked and everyone was killed. In anger he brandishes a knife at Mountbatten, before resigning his post. With Delhi overwhelmed with refugees, the Mountbattens decide to stay on in India to assist where they can. While Jeet volunteers to help with the refugees, Alia is brought in badly injured but alive, the lone survivor of the train attack. She recognizes Jeet and shouts for him, and the two are reunited.

== Cast ==
- Hugh Bonneville as Lord Dickie Mountbatten
- Gillian Anderson as Lady Edwina Mountbatten
- Manish Dayal as Jeet Kumar
- Huma Qureshi as Aalia Noor
- Michael Gambon as Lord Lionel 'Pug' Ismay
- Om Puri as Ali Rahim Noor
- David Hayman as Ewart
- Simon Callow as Cyril Radcliffe
- Denzil Smith as Muhammad Ali Jinnah
- Neeraj Kabi as Mahatma Gandhi
- Tanveer Ghani as Jawaharlal Nehru
- Lily Travers as Pamela Mountbatten
- Jaz Deol as Duleep Singh
- Arunoday Singh as Asif
- Roberta Taylor as Miss Reading
- Darshan Jariwala as Guptaji
- Trishaan as Farrukh
- Raj Zutshi as Head Chef Ram Lal Chandra
- Raja Samar Singh Sarila as ADC Sayed Ahsan
- Sarah-Jane Dias as Sunita
- Samrat Chakrabarti as Moshin
- Hriiday Malhotra as Sanjit
- Simon Williams as Viscount Wavell
- Lucy Fleming as Lady Wavell
- Noah Zeiler as Henry F. Grady
- Robin Soans as Sir Evan Meredith Jenkins
- Terence Harvey as Sir Fred Burrows
- Nicholas Blane as Sir Olaf Kirkpatrick Caroe
- Yusuf Khurram as Sardar Vallabhbhai Patel
- Anil Bhagwat as Liaquat Ali Khan
- Eran Bein as Sir Eric Miéville
- Kamal Karamchandani as Maulana Azad
- Majid Khan as Acharya Kripalani

== Production ==
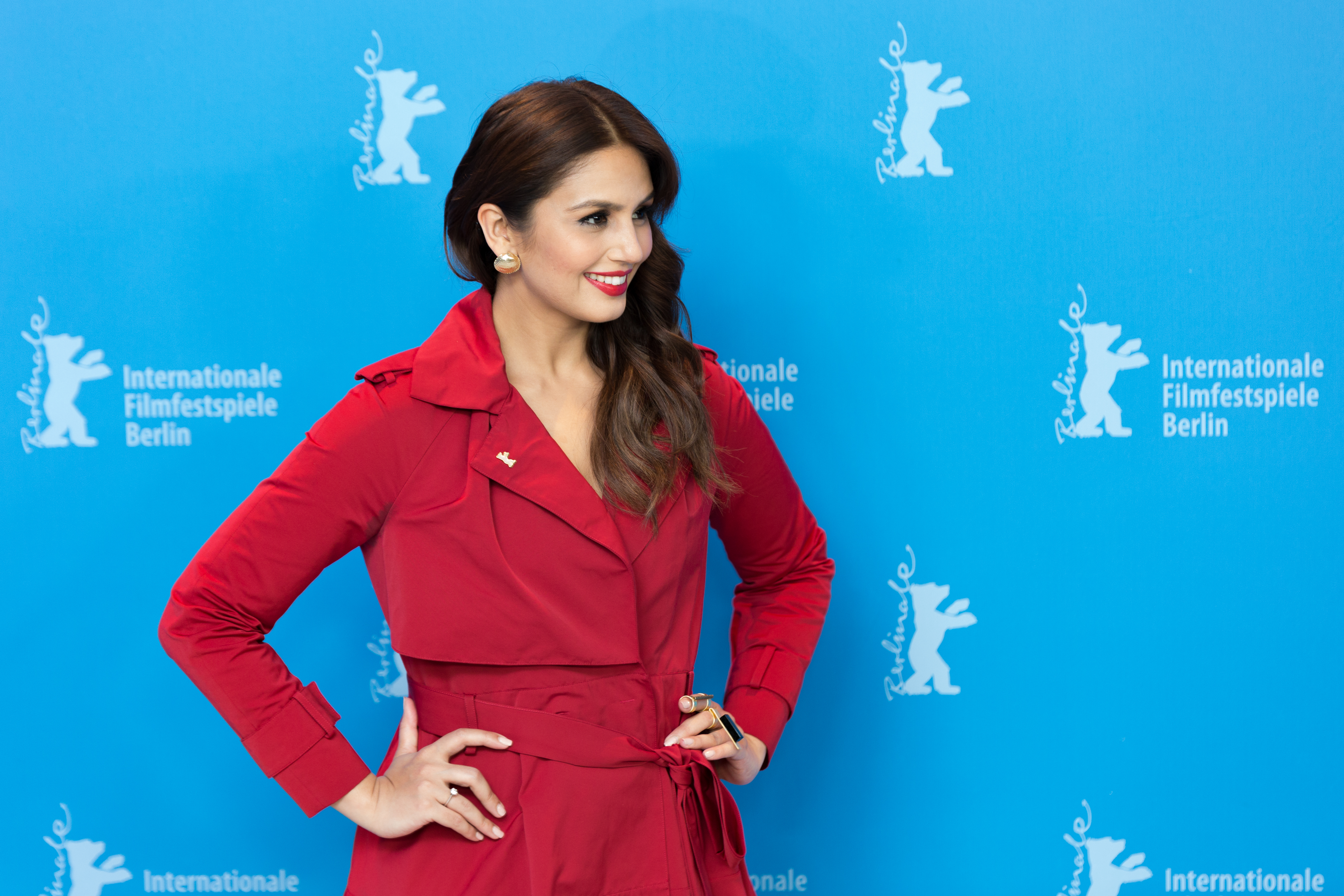
Huma Qureshi presenting the movie Viceroy's House at the Berlinale 2017

On 30 April 2015, it was announced that Hugh Bonneville and Gillian Anderson would star in the fictional period drama film Viceroy's House to be directed by Gurinder Chadha, which Chadha scripted along with Paul Mayeda Berges and Moira Buffini. The film set in 1947 during the Partition of India, and the life inside the Viceroy's House, would be produced by Chadha, Deepak Nayar, and Paul Ritchie. Pathé and BBC Films would be co-financing the film. On 1 September 2015, more cast was announced including Manish Dayal, Huma Qureshi, Tanveer Ghani, Denzil Smith, Neeraj Kabi, Om Puri, Lily Travers, Michael Gambon, and Simon Callow.

Principal photography on the film began on 30 August 2015 in Jodhpur, Rajasthan, India, where it was shot for eight weeks.

The film was released in the United Kingdom on 3 March 2017.

== Soundtrack ==
Viceroy's House (Original Motion Picture Soundtrack)

Soundtrack album by A. R. Rahman
- Released: 3 March 2017 (Digital); 9 June 2017 (CD)
- Recorded: 2016–17; Abbey Road Studios, London; Panchathan Record Inn and AM Studios, Chennai; A. R. Studios, Mumbai
- Genre: Film soundtrack
- Length: 44:43
- Label: Bend It Films (VH) Productions
- Producer: A. R. Rahman

A. R. Rahman chronology
Mom (2017)	Viceroy's House (Original Motion Picture Soundtrack) (2017)	Mersal (2017)

=== Track listing ===
==== Original score ====
No.	Title	Artist(s)	Length
1.	"Viceroy's House"	A. R. Rahman	2:39
2.	"Displacement"	A. R. Rahman	2:35
3.	"Swearing In"	A. R. Rahman	2:34
4.	"Jinnah Meets Mountbatten"	A. R. Rahman	1:21
5.	"Limerence"	A. R. Rahman	1:39
6.	"Gandhi"	A. R. Rahman	1:09
7.	"Pamela and Alia Bond"	A. R. Rahman	1:24
8.	"Dickie Is the Man"	Rekha Sawhney	3:06
9.	"Two Broken Hearts"	A. R. Rahman	3:13
10.	"Ahimsa"	Rekha Sawhney	2:46
11.	"The Partition"	Rekha Sawhney, Anand Bhate	3:59
12.	"Classified"	A. R. Rahman	2:18
13.	"The Birth of Two Nations"	A. R. Rahman	3:29
14.	"Exodus"	Rekha Sawhney, Anand Bhate	4:04
15.	"Jeet Finds Alia"	A. R. Rahman	3:03
16.	"The Cost of Freedom"	A. R. Rahman	5:07
Total length:			44:43

==== Additional tracks ====
Three additional tracks were released for the dubbed Hindi version of the film.

No.	Title	Artist(s)	Length
1.	"Do Dilon Ke"	Shreya Ghoshal, Hariharan	4:45
2.	"Duma Dum Mast Kalander"	Hans Raj Hans	3:30
3.	"Jindwa"	Hans Raj Hans	3:36
Total length:			11:51

== Release ==
Viceroy's House was selected to be screened out of competition at the 67th Berlin International Film Festival on 12 February 2017. The film was released in the United Kingdom on 3 March 2017; it was dubbed in Hindi, titled Partition: 1947, and released in India on 18 August 2017. It was banned in Pakistan.

== Reception ==
The film received generally positive reviews from critics. On review aggregator Rotten Tomatoes, the film holds an approval rating of 76% based on 41 reviews, with an average rating of 6/10. On Metacritic, the film has a weighted average score of 53 out of 100, based on 16 critics, indicating "mixed or average reviews".The New York Times praised the film for "cramming ample history into a compact running time without sacrificing flow or interest." The Washington Post called it "educational, if melodramatic," concluding that "the movie accomplishes a difficult task, making sense of a complicated period in history."

=== Historicity ===
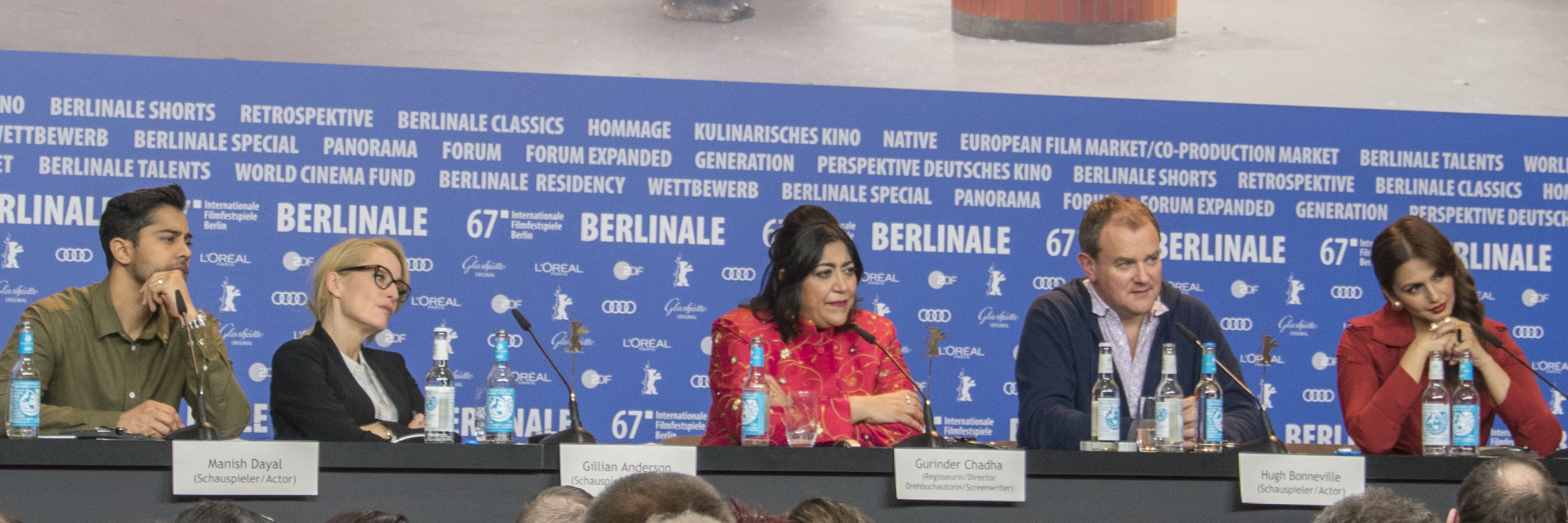
Manish Dayal, Gillian Anderson, Gurinder Chadha, Hugh Bonneville and Huma Qureshi at the 67th Berlin International Film Festival

Chadha described the film as the Upstairs, Downstairs view of the Partition of India. She defended her film against criticisms of historical heterodoxy, saying that she was guided by Narendra Singh Sarila's 2006 book The Shadow of the Great Game: The Untold Story of India's Partition, which was claimed to be based on secret documents discovered in the British Library.

Pakistani Guardian columnist Fatima Bhutto described the film as 'a servile pantomime of partition'. Chadha in response said that "her film about India's partition of 1947, far from ignoring the freedom struggle, celebrates it."

The Guardian summed up the response to the film by saying that "Notices by film reviewers have been muted but reasonably kind", while the reaction from historians was "damning". The newspaper was very critical of the film's climax, criticizing the lack of corroborating research to back up the central claim that Pakistan was created as part of a conspiracy by Winston Churchill and the British government - particularly as in reality it was a Labour government at the time led by Clement Attlee, not Churchill.

The film's postscript reads: "The partition of India led to the largest mass migration in human history. 14 million people were displaced. One million Hindus, Muslims and Sikhs died. This film is dedicated to all of those who died and to all those who survived partition."

== See also ==
- List of artistic depictions of Mahatma Gandhi
