= Freedom at Midnight =

Book by Dominique Lapierre and Larry Collins

- First edition
- Author: Larry Collins and Dominique Lapierre
- Audio read by: Frederick Davidson (1993)
- Language: English
- Subjects: British India, partition, colonialism, Mahatma Gandhi
- Genre: Non-fiction, history
- Published: 1975
- Publisher: William Collins (UK); Simon & Schuster (US)
- ISBN: 9780706904062
- OCLC: 813178801

Freedom at Midnight (1975) is a book by Larry Collins and Dominique Lapierre about the events surrounding the Indian independence movement and partition. It details the last year of the British Raj, from 1947 to 1948, beginning with the appointment of Lord Mountbatten of Burma as the last viceroy of British India, and ending with the death and funeral of Mahatma Gandhi.

== Content ==
The book provides a detailed account of the last year of the British Raj; the reactions of princely states towards independence, including descriptions of the colourful and extravagant lifestyles of the Indian princes; the partition of British India (into India and Pakistan) on religious grounds; and the bloodshed that followed.

There is a description of Shimla, the British summertime capital in the Himalayas, and how supplies were carried up steep mountains by porters each year. Also covered in detail are the events leading to the assassination of Mahatma Gandhi, as well as the life and motives of Jawaharlal Nehru and Muhammad Ali Jinnah.

Regarding partition, the book—providing maps of Punjab, Bengal, and Kashmir—relates that the crucial maps setting the boundary separating India and Pakistan were drawn that year by Cyril Radcliffe, who had not visited India before being appointed as the chairman of the Boundary Commission. The book depicts the fury of both Hindus and Muslims, misled by their communal leaders, during the partition; and the biggest mass slaughter in the history of India, as millions of people were uprooted by the partition and tried to migrate by train, oxcart, and on foot to new places designated for their particular religious group. Many migrants fell victim to bandits and religious extremists of both dominant religions. One incident quoted describes a canal in Lahore that ran with blood and floating bodies.

The book is told casually, similar to the authors' previous works, Is Paris Burning? and O Jerusalem!.

== Background ==
The authors interviewed some people related to the events, including a focus on Lord Mountbatten of Burma. They subsequently wrote a book based on their research on the British officer, titled Mountbatten and the Partition of India, containing interviews with Mountbatten and a selection of papers in his possession.

== Reception ==
Freedom at Midnight aroused controversy for portraying the British expatriates, the native rulers of India, and members of India's first cabinet. James Cameron described it as the result of deep research into events often neglected by other historians.

The book was criticised as "misleading," "biased," and "yellow journalism." Earl Drake found the book's illustration of Huseyn Shaheed Suhrawardy "totally biased." Journalist Shyam Ratna Gupta remarked, "One might ask, did the authors intend to provide us with fictional documentation, politico-historical gossip, or pop journalism on events and personalities of that time?"

Gopal Godse demanded a ban on the book for claiming that Vinayak Damodar Savarkar and Nathuram Godse had a homosexual relationship. Gopal Godse had challenged Collins and Lapierre to "produce any evidence" to substantiate their version.

== Adaptations ==
This book was one of the inspirations for the 2017 film Viceroy's House. Freedom at Midnight, the 2024 Hindi-language historical drama web series directed by Nikkhil Advani and produced by SonyLIV, is adapted from the book.
