= The Fifth Horseman (novel) =

1980 novel by Larry Collins and Dominique Lapierre

- First edition cover
- Author: Larry Collins and Dominique Lapierre
- Publisher: Simon & Schuster
- Publication date: August 25, 1980
- ISBN: 0-786-10201-2

The Fifth Horseman is a 1980 techno-thriller novel by American writer Larry Collins and French writer Dominique Lapierre. The story revolves Libyan-backed terrorists holding New York City hostage with a hidden nuclear bomb.

A related book by the authors, Is New York Burning?, examines the same scenario, but set in 2005, with George W. Bush and Osama bin Laden replacing the depicted President and Muammar Gaddafi.

== Plot ==
Libyan terrorist Kamal Dajani arrives in New York City with a powerful bomb, built by his brother Whalid, a nuclear scientist. They, along with their sister Laila, are working for Libyan leader Muammar Gaddafi and are intent on avenging the loss of their father and their home in the West Bank. A disguised Laila delivers a written threat from Gaddafi to the White House, with instructions on how to retrieve technical designs for the bomb from an airport locker. The president of the United States (unnamed, but heavily based on Jimmy Carter) and his advisors monitor the situation and learn from the Department of Energy that it is a three megaton hydrogen bomb.

The Nuclear Emergency Support Team is activated, but their attempts to search for the bomb are hindered by the technological limits of their equipment and other terrorists releasing pigeons carrying radioactive pellets to confuse the search effort. The NYPD and FBI, including Detective Angelo Rocchia and Agent Mike Rand, conduct their own investigation.

The Mayor of New York City is summoned to the White House and informed of the nuclear threat by the President. They learn New York City's civil defense capabilities are extremely lacking, that a citywide evacuation has been denied by Gaddafi and would not work anyway, and that up to eight million people would be killed by the explosion and ensuing chaos, with the rest of New England receiving the fallout.

Meanwhile, Israel prepares to launch airstrike operations against Libya, until the French ambassador warns Israel that the Soviet Union will launch a nuclear strike against Israel unless the strike is aborted—a threat actually requested by the U.S. President himself to keep Israel in line. Israeli Prime Minister Menachem Begin learns of this and declares he will not vacate the West Bank settlements as demanded by Gaddafi, warning the Israel Defense Forces may mutiny if ordered to vacate the settlements.

Rand and Rocchia make progress in their investigation, and they eventually identify Whalid and Kamal. The French fax the records of Whalid, Kamal, and Laila to the CIA. Rand and Rocchia arrest wanted terrorist Nabil Suleiman and threaten to deport him directly into the custody of Mossad unless he becomes a witness in the case; Nabil complies and identifies Laila and Kamal based on the French photos. Meanwhile, Rocchia, upset with the NYPD being lied to while the FBI is told the truth, takes his daughter out of the city to safety.

As the Israeli crisis intensifies, the President briefs the U.S. military's Rapid Deployment Force with options to invade the West Bank, but his advisors manage to reassure him that Israel is a crucial ally. At the same time, a major deadline passes, but the bomb does not detonate.

Meanwhile, at a safe distance away from the bomb, Whalid admits to Kamal that he did not build the bomb to incinerate New York City, but rather to bring Libya to nuclear parity with the other nuclear-armed powers; to ensure it could not actually detonate, he manipulated the bomb's computer and gave them incorrect detonation procedures. After a brief fight, Whalid is killed by Kamal, who steals the actual detonation procedure checklist and drives back to detonate the bomb himself, bringing Laila with him.

The President reconsiders his options and decides he must act against Libya. He orders two U.S. Navy submarines to aim their SLBMs at Libya, with orders to launch them unless the bomb is found and defused, or unless Gaddafi extends his latest ultimatum. Though Gaddafi's advisors believe the U.S. has capitulated, Gaddafi argues the Americans are stalling for time.

The NYPD and FBI, investigating the murder of Whalid, confirm Kamal is their suspect. Kamal, having reached New York City, tells Laila to flee to Montreal and steals an ambulance to reach the bomb. Rand and Rocchia locate the stolen ambulance and pursue it to the bomb's location. Rocchia attempts to arrest Kamal, but Kamal shoots at him, and Rocchia falls over, playing dead. Rand enters under the belief Rocchia is dead, but Rocchia is unable to warn him without revealing his cover, and Rand is shot and killed by Kamal; the encounter allows Rocchia to kill Kamal, avenging Rand. NEST locates the bomb and uses ultraviolet radiation to burn out its microprocessor, defusing the bomb, saving New York City, and preventing the SLBM launches.

Meanwhile, Laila, driving to the U.S.–Canada border, is located and pursued by police. As she speeds up to evade them, her vehicle loses control on black ice and crashes, and she burns to death in the wreckage, wrapping up the final loose end of the terrorist plot.

With the crisis finally over, elements of the U.S. government call for revenge, but the President, seeing Libya and Israel are now locked into a nuclear standoff, instead simply sends Gaddafi a quote from the Quran: "Whoever ye shall be, death will overtake you, even though ye reside in lofty towers."

== Development ==
The books were published by Michael Korda at Simon & Schuster in 1980. The authors, Larry Collins and Dominique Lapierre, were journalists, Collins having written for Newsweek and Lapierre for Paris Match. According to Korda, Charles Bluhdorn, founder of Gulf + Western which at the time was the parent company over Simon & Schuster and Paramount, became obsessed with the possibilities of the realities in the book. Bluhdorn would hold up meetings with financial managers to warn them of the danger written about in the book. To that end, Bluhdorn made it his mission to create a movie out of the book and tried to enlist Barry Diller, then head of Paramount, to his side. Ultimately, Diller and Korda convinced Bluhdorn that making the film was a bad idea, and it was abandoned. The agent for the book was Irving Paul Lazar.

== French version ==
The French version of The Fifth Horseman follows the same general plot as the English version, but has a different ending. In the French version, Gaddafi is not sent the telegram quoting the Quran after the bomb is discovered. The Israeli crisis is concluded with the President inviting both Gaddafi and Begin to Camp David in secret, to seek an effective solution to the Israeli–Palestinian conflict. The final scene of the French version shows Rocchia being quietly informed of this, and he remarks on the absurdity of risking the lives of millions of people for this to happen. Laila also does not die in a car crash, and is instead arrested by the police and sentenced to life in prison.
