= O Jerusalem (film) =

2006 French film

- Directed by: Elie Chouraqui
- Written by: Elie Chouraqui; Didier Le Pechuer
- Produced by: Jeffrey Konvitz
- Starring: JJ Feild; Saïd Taghmaoui; Maria Papas; Patrick Bruel; Ian Holm; Tovah Feldshuh; Mel Raido; Cécile Cassel; Mhairi Steenbock; Tom Conti; Shirel; Peter Polycarpou
- Release date: 18 October 2006
- Countries: France; United Kingdom
- Languages: English; Arabic; Hebrew

O Jerusalem is a 2006 drama film directed by Elie Chouraqui. It is based on the historical documentary novel of the same name, written by Dominique Lapierre and Larry Collins.

It stars JJ Feild and Saïd Taghmaoui as the protagonists, with Ian Holm and Tovah Feldshuh portraying Israeli political figures, David Ben Gurion and Golda Meir. It is Felshuh's second time portraying Meir, having taken the titular role in the play Golda's Balcony in 2003.

The working title for release in the US was Beyond Friendship. It was produced for US distribution by Jeffrey Konvitz.

== Plot ==
The film begins with footage from the Battle of Berlin and then the liberation of Dachau concentration camp. Bobby Goldman (Feild), an American Jewish soldier who helped liberate Dachau strikes up a friendship in post-war New York City with Said Chahine (Taghmaoui), a wealthy Palestinian student from Jerusalem. As the United Nations votes for the creation of the state of Israel, both are pulled into conflict, their involvement taking them from New York City to Jerusalem, where they risk their lives for what they each believe in. It depicts the 1947–1949 Palestine war and the end of the British mandate of Palestine.

== Cast ==
- JJ Feild – Bobby Goldman
- Saïd Taghmaoui – Saïd Chahine
- Maria Papas – Hadassah
- Patrick Bruel – David Levin
- Ian Holm – David Ben Gurion
- Tovah Feldshuh – Golda Meir
- Mel Raido – Jacob
- Cécile Cassel – Jane
- Mhairi Steenbock – Cathy
- Tom Conti – Sir Cunningham
- Shirel – Yaël
- Peter Polycarpou – Abdel Khader
- Yonatan Uziel – Post manager

== Production ==
According to Feldshuh, the film faced significant budget restraints, with two of her scenes cut and Chouraqui needing to rely on stock documentary footage and spare editing.

== Critical reception ==
On Rotten Tomatoes, the film received a 36% approval rating based on 22 reviews, indicating a generally negative reception, with the site consensus being "[t]hough a noble effort, O Jerusalem fails to combine this history lesson and human drama into a coherent cinematic piece". On Metacritic, the film has a weighted average, score of 39 out of 100 based on 11 critics, indicating "overwhelming dislike".

However, film critic Stephen Farber was more positive, writing for The Hollywood Reporter: "It is admirable in trying to be fair to the Israeli and Arab perspectives while lamenting the enmity that endures to this day".

Jeannette Catsoulis in The New York Times wrote a negative review of the film, describing it as a "middle school history lesson – complete with textbook dialogue and strained neutrality".

John Anderson wrote in Variety that "[t]here's a great movie inside O Jerusalem that wants freedom and independence, but is suppressed by an earnestness that's practically colonial".
