= Is Paris Burning? (film) =

1966 war film by René Clément

- Theatrical release poster
- Directed by: René Clément
- Screenplay by: Gore Vidal; Francis Ford Coppola; Jean Aurenche; Pierre Bost; Claude Brulé
- Based on: Is Paris Burning; 1965 book by Larry Collins; Dominique Lapierre
- Produced by: Paul Graetz
- Starring: Jean-Paul Belmondo; Charles Boyer; Leslie Caron; Jean-Pierre Cassel; George Chakiris; Alain Delon; Kirk Douglas; Glenn Ford; Gert Fröbe; Yves Montand; Anthony Perkins; Simone Signoret; Robert Stack; Marie Versini; Skip Ward; Orson Welles
- Cinematography: Marcel Grignon
- Edited by: Robert Lawrence
- Music by: Maurice Jarre
- Production companies: Seven Arts Productions; Marianne Productions; Transcontinental Films
- Distributed by: Paramount Pictures
- Release dates: 26 October 1966 (France); 10 November 1966 (U.S.)
- Running time: 173 minutes
- Countries: France; United States
- Languages: French; English
- Box office: $37.1 million

Is Paris Burning? (French: Paris brûle-t-il ?) is a 1966 black-and-white epic war film about the liberation of Paris in August 1944 by the French Resistance and the Free French Forces during World War II. A French-American co-production, it was directed by French filmmaker René Clément, with a screenplay by Gore Vidal, Francis Ford Coppola, Jean Aurenche, Pierre Bost and Claude Brulé, adapted from the 1965 book of the same title by Larry Collins and Dominique Lapierre. The film stars an international ensemble cast that includes French (Jean-Paul Belmondo, Alain Delon, Bruno Cremer, Pierre Vaneck, Jean-Pierre Cassel, Leslie Caron, Charles Boyer, Yves Montand), American (Orson Welles, Kirk Douglas, Glenn Ford, Robert Stack, Anthony Perkins, George Chakiris) and German (Gert Fröbe, Hannes Messemer, Ernst Fritz Fürbringer, Harry Meyen, Wolfgang Preiss) stars.

The film was released in France on October 26, 1966, and in the United States on November 10, 1966. It received generally positive reviews, and was the fourth-most-popular film of the year in France for 1966. It was nominated for Best Cinematography (Black and White) and Academy Award for Best Art Direction at the 40th Academy Awards and a Golden Globe Award for Best Original Score.

== Plot ==
Shortly after the failed attempt to assassinate him in 1944, Adolf Hitler appoints General der Infanterie Dietrich von Choltitz as military governor of occupied Paris, believing he'll obey his order to destroy Paris if the Allies are ever in position to capture it. Two factions of the French Resistance react differently to news that the approaching Allied forces plan to bypass the city to avoid costly street-fighting. The Gaullists under Jacques Chaban-Delmas don't wish to risk revealing themselves, while the communists under Colonel Rol-Tanguy spark a general uprising by the citizens of Paris, occupying important government buildings and effectively forcing the Gaullists to also participate.

Choltitz is intent on following Hitler's order and after his troops fail to dislodge the Resistance from the Paris Police Prefecture, he orders the Luftwaffe to bomb the building. Swedish consul Raoul Nordling points out that bombs missing the Prefecture might destroy culturally significant buildings such as Notre Dame Cathedral and Choltitz accepts a truce offer from the Gaullists. The communists refuse to stop fighting and the truce dies after a day. A messenger from the Resistance is sent to advise the approaching Americans that the Germans have rigged the Eiffel Tower and other landmarks with explosives and that the Resistance controls parts of the city. He implores them for support to prevent the uprising being crushed as was then happening in Warsaw. General Omar Bradley agrees that the 2nd Armored Division under General Philippe Leclerc should enter the city.

Choltitz believes Hitler is insane and that the destruction of Paris would be a futile gesture in a war that is already lost. Expecting to be arrested when two SS officers arrive, they reveal that Himmler has asked them to rescue the Bayeux Tapestry for his private collection prior to the destruction of the Louvre.

A French major persuades General Leclerc that the symbolic gesture of a token force of Allied tanks entering the city will prevent the Germans from destroying the city. Sherman tanks operated by the Free French enter the city as the front line reaches 50 km (31 mi) from Paris. The Germans prepare explosives in the Eiffel Tower and under various bridges and release imprisoned men to help defend strongpoints. The first Sherman is hit by an artillery shell, but a unit with tanks named for battles of the Spanish Civil War reaches the Hôtel de Ville. Choltitz gives no destruction orders and decides to surrender his forces. He phones German high command to ask that his family not suffer. Other Germans continue to lay explosives, and two officers debate as they lay mines at Napoleon's tomb in Les Invalides.

Fighting breaks out in the streets and civilians join in the battle. Allied troops reach Rue de Rivoli and enter Choltitz's office at the Hotel Meurice, asking him to have German officers accompany Free French troops throughout the city under white flags to convey the surrender order to his troops. French tanks reach Notre Dame Cathedral and reactivate the bells after years of silence. The crowd cheers and sings "La Marseillaise." Free French forces parade down the streets of Paris led by General de Gaulle. Against a backdrop of cheering crowds, a phone receiver is shown dangling off the hook with a German voice repeatedly asking "Is Paris burning?" Aerial footage shows Paris intact, and the view switches from the black and white of 1944 to contemporary colour footage.

== Cast ==
=== French ===
- Jean-Paul Belmondo as Yvon "Pierrelot" Morandat or simply Yvon Morandat, Free French adjunct
- Alain Delon as Jacques Chaban-Delmas, Gaullist general of brigade
- Bruno Cremer as Col. Henri Rol-Tanguy, commander of Francs-Tireurs et Partisans
- Charles Boyer as Dr. Robert Monod
- Pierre Vaneck as Maj. Roger Cocteau-Gallois, Ceux de la Résistance
- Pierre Dux as Alexandre "Cerat" Parodi, delegate of French Committee of National Liberation
- Leslie Caron as Françoise Labe
- Jean-Pierre Cassel as Lt. Henri Karcher, Free French forces
- Yves Montand as Marcel Bizien, Free French forces
- Claude Rich as Gen. Philippe Leclerc, Free French forces
  - Rich also makes an uncredited appearance as Free French Lieutenant Pierre de la Fouchardière.
- Marie Versini as Claire Morandat
- Michel Piccoli as Edgard Pisani
- Claude Dauphin as Col. Edmond Lebel
- Daniel Gélin as Yves Bayet
- Georges Staquet as Capt. Raymond Dronne, Free French forces
- Serge Rousseau as Pierre "Colonel Fabien" Gorges, Francs-Tireurs et Partisans
- Georges Géret as "Commander Georges"
- Jean Négroni as Pierre Villon
- Michael Lonsdale as Jacques Debu-Bridel
- Michel Etcheverry as Prefet Charles Luizet
- Sacha Pitoëff as Frédéric Joliot-Curie
- Simone Signoret as a Cafe Proprietress
- Paul Crauchet as a Curé
- Roger Lumont as Claude "Jade Amicol" Arnould
- Félix Marten as Georges Landrieu
- Tony Taffin as Bernard Labé
- Bernard Fresson as a Free French liaison officer
- Jean-Louis Trintignant as "Captain Serge", Vichy anti-partisan operative

=== Neutral ===
- Orson Welles as Raoul Nordling, Swedish consul to France

=== Americans ===
- Kirk Douglas as Lieutenant General George S. Patton
- Glenn Ford as Lieutenant General Omar Bradley
- Robert Stack as Brigadier General Edwin Sibert
- Anthony Perkins as Sgt. Warren, infantryman
- E.G. Marshall as Powell, intelligence officer
- Skip Ward as Charlie, infantryman
- Billy Kearns as Col. Charles Codman, aide to Gen. Patton
- George Chakiris as a Tank Sergeant

=== German ===
- Gert Fröbe as General der Infanterie Dietrich von Choltitz, military governor of Paris
- Hannes Messemer as Generaloberst Alfred Jodl
- Ernst Fritz Fürbringer as Generalleutnant Hans von Boineburg-Lengsfeld
- Billy Frick as Adolf Hitler
- Harry Meyen as Leutnant von Arnim
- Claus Holm as Huhm
- Joachim Hansen as the Commandant of Fresnes Prison
- Konrad Georg as Generalfeldmarschall Walter Model, Oberbefehlshaber West
- Peter Jacob as General der Infanterie Wilhelm Burgdorf
- Wolfgang Preiss as Hauptmann Ebernach
- Günter Meisner as the Waffen-SS Commandant in Pantin
- Helmuth Schneider as a metro adjunct
- Karl-Otto Alberty and Peter Neusser as Waffen-SS Officers

== Production ==
The film is based on the best-selling book by Larry Collins and Dominique Lapierre and was directed by René Clément, from a screenplay by Gore Vidal, Francis Ford Coppola, Jean Aurenche, Pierre Bost and Claude Brulé. According to Coppola, Paramount sent him and Anthony Veiller to Paris to work on the screenplay because producer Paul Graetz prohibited Clément from modifying it. Veiller was ill (he died of cancer in 1965 before the movie premiered) and could not do so. Coppola wrote parts of the script in English and translated his pages into French so Clément could provide feedback. One morning, Graetz called for Coppola to meet with him and Clément about the revisions. Graetz professed, "You have ruined my script!" Coppola admitted to taking notes from the director; Clément denied it. Graetz argued with Coppola, asserting, "I was making films 40 years before you were born," to which Coppola said, "I will be making films 40 years after you die." Graetz died "a week later" in 1966. Coppola did not like the film or seeing his name in the credits alongside Vidal: "We didn't write that script. This script is more Aurenche, Bost, and those French guys. They didn't get credit because they weren't in the American Guild."

The film was shot in black and white mainly because, although the French authorities would allow Nazi swastika flags to be displayed on public buildings for key shots, they would not permit the flags to bear in their original red color; as a result, green swastika flags were used, which photographed adequately in black and white. However, the closing credits feature aerial shots of Paris in color.

The production was filmed at 180 sites throughout Paris, including at Rue de la Huchette, Place des Vosges, Les Invalides, Place de la Concorde, Notre-Dame, the Latin Quarter and Musée Carnavalet. According to screenwriter Francis Ford Coppola, the film's production was strictly controlled by Charles de Gaulle, who would only permit location filming in Paris if his rules were obeyed to the letter. He was particularly concerned with minimizing the part played in the liberation by the French Communist Party. Coppola called de Gaulle's interference blatant political censorship.

Claude Rich plays two parts: General Leclerc, with a moustache, and Lt. Pierre de la Fouchardière, without a moustache, although he is credited only for the part of Leclerc. As a teenager, Rich was watching soldiers in the street when Pierre de la Fouchardière called him into a building to protect him. Orson Welles repeatedly clashed with Clément, refusing to speak directly to him despite being fluent in French. Reportedly, Welles was upset that Clément had been given such a large budget for a project, while he had been struggling to find financing for his own projects.

All sequences featuring French and German actors were filmed in their native languages and later dubbed in English, while all the sequences with the American actors (including Welles) were filmed in English. Separate French and English-language dubs were produced.

== Music ==
The score was composed by Maurice Jarre, whose music for "The Paris Waltz", with lyrics by Maurice Vidalin, became a patriotic anthem sung by Mireille Mathieu under the title "Paris en colère".

== Reception ==
Is Paris Burning? was the fourth-most-popular film of the year in France for 1966. It received mostly positive reviews from critics. The film holds a 75% approval rating on Rotten Tomatoes, based on 8 reviews.

== Awards and honors ==
The film was nominated for two Academy Awards:

- Best Art Direction (Willy Holt, Marc Frédérix, and Pierre Guffroy)
- Best Cinematography (Marcel Grignon)

== In popular culture ==
The film was spoofed in the September 1967 issue (#113) of Mad magazine under the title "Is Paris Boring?"

== See also ==
- Diplomacy – another film about the threatened destruction of Paris
