= Marc Frédérix =

French art director (1919–2004)

- Born: 1919; Paris
- Died: 2004 (aged 84–85); Paris
- Occupation: Art director
- Years active: 1950-1984

Marc Frédérix (1919–2004) was a French art director. He was nominated for an Academy Award in the category Best Art Direction for the film Is Paris Burning?

== Selected filmography ==
- Is Paris Burning? (1966)
