= Is Paris Burning? (book) =

1965 book by Larry Collins and Dominique Lapierre

- Author: Larry Collins and Dominique Lapierre
- Original title: Paris brûle-t-il ?
- Language: French
- Genre: History
- Published: 1964 Éditions Robert Laffont (French); 1965 Penguin Books
- ISBN: 978-0-446-39225-9

Is Paris Burning? is a 1964 book by Larry Collins and Dominique Lapierre telling the story of the Liberation of Paris during the Second World War. The book examines the military and political actions surrounding the events of late August 1944 around Paris and how these events unfolded. The book was originally published by éditions Robert Laffont in French under the title Paris brûle-t-il ?, with an English translation published in 1965 by Penguin Books.

The title is taken from the question reportedly asked by Adolf Hitler following his order to destroy the city rather than let it be re-captured by the Allies. The story was adapted into a feature film by the same name in 1966.

== Structure ==
The book is presented in three parts;

Part 1, "The Menace", examines the military and political situation at the beginning of August 1944, and the considerations of the various parties involved.

Part 2, "The Struggle", is a day-by-day account of the actions between 19 August, when the uprising by the French Resistance in the city commenced, and 25 August, when the German garrison surrendered.

Part 3, "The Deliverance", describes the activities of 26 and 27 August, detailing particularly the consolidation by General de Gaulle of his position as leader of the liberated French state.

== Style ==
The book is written as a series of vignettes based on interviews with, and the written memoirs of, the people involved, on all sides, in the liberation of Paris. These include members of the various factions of the French Resistance, and of the Free French Forces and citizens of Paris; members of the American Armed Forces; and members of the occupying German Army.

Researchers spent nearly three years locating survivors of the Liberation of Paris, and undertook over 800 interviews of persons in France, Germany and the United States. They also had access to Allied and German action reports, war diaries, memoirs, and official records.

Senior Allied officers who assisted the authors included Generals Dwight D. Eisenhower and Omar Bradley, and Allen Dulles (of the OSS); French interviewees included Jacques Chaban-Delmas and Henri Rol-Tanguy (of the French Resistance), Mme Leclerc (widow of Jacques Leclerc) and Alain de Boissieu (son-in-law of Charles de Gaulle); and from Germany, Dietrich von Choltitz (Commandant of the Paris garrison) and Walter Warlimont (of the German High Command).
