= Thomas Anthony Harris =

American physician

- Died: May 4, 1995; Sacramento, California, U.S.
- Occupations: Psychiatrist, author
- Writing career
- Notable work: I'm OK – You're OK (1969)

Thomas Anthony Harris (April 18, 1910 – May 4, 1995) was an American psychiatrist and author who became famous for his self-help manual I'm OK – You're OK (1967). The book was a bestseller and its name became a cliché during the 1970s.

== Career ==
Harris received his Bachelor of Science degree from the University of Arkansas in 1938, and his M. D. from the Temple University School of Medicine in 1940. After graduation, he joined the Navy as a medical intern. He was aboard the submarine tender USS Pelias (AS-14) when it was attacked at Pearl Harbor in December 1941, and sustained permanent hearing loss as a result. Upon completion of his internship in 1942, Harris began his training in Psychiatry at St. Elizabeth's Hospital in Washington D.C. He returned to the Navy after completing his residency. Toward the end of the war, he served as Chief Psychiatric Officer on the hospital ship USS Haven (AH-12). Harris ultimately became Chief of the Psychiatry Branch of the Navy, and ended his service as a Commander in 1954.

Following his retirement, Harris became Chief of the Department of Institutions in Washington state. During this time, he played a critical role in defusing a riot at the maximum security prison in Walla Walla. However, he soon grew tired of bureaucratic work, and opened a private psychiatric practice in Sacramento, CA in 1956.

Harris was a long-time friend and associate of Eric Berne, the founder of Transactional Analysis, beginning when both men were among the few psychiatrists in the U.S. military. He was also a founding member of Berne's San Francisco Transactional Analysis Seminar, which met weekly for over a decade, and which developed the main concepts of TA. A Teaching Member of the International Transactional Analysis Association, Harris was an early advocate for group therapy and TA in preference to traditional psychoanalysis, for which he was trained by Harry Stack Sullivan.

== Publications ==
During 1985, Harris published Staying OK, a sequel to I'm OK – You're OK, written with his wife, the journalist and lecturer Amy Bjork Harris (born 1929).

== See also ==
- Script analysis
