= I'm OK – You're OK =

Book by Thomas Anthony Harris

- Author: Thomas Anthony Harris
- Language: English
- Genre: Self-help
- Publisher: Harper & Row
- Publication date: 1967
- Publication place: United States
- Media type: Print (Hardcover)
- Pages: 320
- ISBN: 978-0060724276

I'm OK – You're OK is a 1967 self-help book by psychiatrist Thomas A Harris. The book presents transactional analysis as a method for addressing personal challenges.

The book made the New York Times Best Seller list in 1972 and remained there for almost two years. It is estimated by the publisher to have sold over 15 million copies to date and to have been translated into over a dozen languages.

== Content ==
In the preface, Harris praises the then-new procedure of transactional analysis (TA, or as Harris often refers to it, P-A-C) as a major innovation addressing the slow process and limited results that he and other psychiatric practitioners believed was characteristic of conventional psychiatry.

=== Harris' context for the book ===
Rather than working with abstract concepts of consciousness, Harris suggests that the pioneering work of brain surgeon Wilder Penfield in uncovering the neurological basis of memory could offer complementary insights grounded in observable reality. Specifically, Harris emphasizes reports of Penfield's experiments stimulating small areas of the brains of conscious patients undergoing brain surgery (the brain does not have any pain receptors, so this can be done in relative comfort for the patient). Though the patients were conscious that they were on an operating table, the stimulation also caused them to recall specific past events in vivid detail—not just facts of the event, but as a vivid "reliving" of "what the patient saw and heard and felt and understood" when the memory was created. Based on these experiments, Harris postulates that the brain records past experiences like a tape recorder, in such a manner that it is possible subsequently to relive past experiences with all their original emotional intensity.

Harris continues by linking his interpretation of Penfield's experiments to the work of Eric Berne, whose model of psychotherapy is based on the idea that emotionally intense memories from childhood are ever-present in adults. Their influence can be understood by carefully analysing the verbal and non-verbal interchanges ('transactions') between people, hence Berne's name for his model: Transactional Analysis. Harris sees great merit in the ability of TA to define basic units through which human behaviour can be analysed—the 'strokes' that are given and received in a 'transaction' between two or more people—and a standardised language for describing those strokes. This readily understood standardisation, and the association Harris develops between TA and Penfield's neuroscience, gives TA a degree of credibility not possessed by earlier abstract models such as that developed by Freud.

=== Parent, Adult, Child (P-A-C) model ===
After describing the context for his belief of the significance of TA, Harris describes TA, starting from the observation that a person's psychological state seems to change in response to different situations. The question is, from what and to what does it change? Harris answers this through a simplified introduction to TA, explaining Berne's proposal that there are three states into which a person can switch: the Parent, the Adult and the Child.

Harris describes the mental state called the Parent by analogy, as a collection of "tape recordings" of external influences that a child observed adults doing and saying. The recording is a long list of rules and admonitions about the way the world is that the child was expected to believe unquestioningly. Many of these rules (for example: "Never run out in front of traffic") are relatively basic, often relating to immediate physical need or danger; others (e.g. "...you can never trust a cop", "...busy hands are happy hands") are more complex and concern more subtle or nuanced regions. Nevertheless, Harris asserts that both the former and the latter are 'recorded' in the child's memory in the same manner, as 'Parent' dictations, rather than actually understood concepts or philosophical precepts.

In parallel with those Parent recordings, the Child is a simultaneous recording of internal events—how life felt as a child. Harris equates these with the vivid recordings that Wilder Penfield was able to cause his patients to re-live by stimulating their brains. Harris proposes that adults may re-experience 'Child' memories when feeling discouraged, even if the original stimuli are no longer present or relevant.

According to Harris, humans start developing a third mental state, the Adult, about the time children start to walk and begin to achieve some measure of control over their environment. Instead of learning ideas directly from parents into the Parent, or experiencing simple emotion as the Child, children begin to be able to explore and examine the world and form their own opinions. They test the assertions of the Parent and Child and either update them or learn to suppress them. Thus the Adult inside us all develops over time, but it is very fragile and can be readily overwhelmed by stressful situations. Its strength is also tested through conflict between the simplistic ideas of the Parent and reality. Sometimes, Harris asserts, it is safer for a person to believe a lie than to acknowledge the evidence in front of them. This is called Contamination of the Adult.

=== Four life positions ===
The phrase I'm OK, You're OK is one of four "life positions" that each of us may take. The four positions are:

1. I'm Not OK, You're OK
2. I'm Not OK, You're Not OK
3. I'm OK, You're Not OK
4. I'm OK, You're OK

According to Harris, the most common position is I'm Not OK, You're OK, which he attributes to children's perceptions of adults as strong and competent, leading them to view themselves as less capable. Children who are abused may conclude I'm Not OK, You're Not OK or I'm OK, You're Not OK, but these are much less common. The emphasis of the book is helping people understand how their life position affects their communications (transactions) and relationships with practical examples.

I'm OK, You're OK continues by providing practical advice to begin decoding the physical and verbal clues required to analyze transactions. For example, Harris suggests signs that a person is in a Parent ego state can include the use of evaluative words that imply judgment based on an automatic, axiomatic and archaic value system: words like 'stupid, naughty, ridiculous, disgusting, should or ought' (though the latter can also be used in the Adult ego state).

Harris introduces a diagrammatic representation of two classes of communication between individuals: complementary transactions, which can continue indefinitely, and crossed transactions, which cause a cessation of communication (and frequently an argument). Harris suggests that crossed transactions are problematic because they "hook" the Child ego state of one of the participants, resulting in negative feelings. Harris suggests that awareness of this possibility, through TA, can give people a choice about how they react when confronted with an interpersonal situation which makes them feel uncomfortable. Harris provides practical suggestions regarding how to stay in the Adult ego state, despite the provocation.

Having described a generalized model of the ego states inside human beings, and the transactions between them, Harris then describes how individuals differ. He argues that insights can be gained by examining the degree to which an individual's Adult ego state is contaminated by the other ego states. He summarizes contamination of the Adult by the Parent as "prejudice" and contamination of the Adult by the Child as "delusion". A healthy individual is able to separate these states. Yet, Harris argues, a functioning person does need all three ego states to be present in their psyche in order for them to be complete. Someone who excludes (i.e. blocks out) their Child completely cannot play and enjoy life; while someone who excludes their Parent ego state can be a danger to society (they may become a manipulative psychopath who does not feel shame, remorse, embarrassment or guilt).

Harris also identifies from his medical practice examples of individuals with blocked out Adult ego states, who were psychotic, terrified and varied between the Parent ego state's archaic admonitions about the world and the raw emotional state of the Child, making them non-treatable by therapy. For such cases, Harris endorses drug treatments, or electro-convulsive therapy, as a way to temporarily disrupt the disturbing ego states, allowing the "recommissioning" of the Adult ego state by therapy. Harris reports a similar approach to treating bipolar disorder.

The second half of the book begins by briefly describing the six ways that TA practitioners recognize individuals use to structure time, to make life seem meaningful. Harris continues by offering practical case studies showing applications of TA to marriage and the raising of both children and adolescents. Harris suggests that TA is not exclusively a method for specialists but can be applied by individuals in various contexts.

Having described such a structured method of dealing with the challenges of human psychology, the final two chapters of the book discuss the question of improving morality and society. In particular, he asks, if people are not to succumb to domination by the Parent ego state, how can individuals enlightened through TA know how they should live their lives? Starting from his axiomatic statement I'm OK, You're OK, he acknowledges that accepting it at face value raises the same philosophical dilemmas as the problem of evil does for believers in a just, omnipotent God. Harris continues to explore aspects of Christianity with reference to TA, together with more generalized questions about the nature of religion.

The final chapter of I'm OK, You're OK refers to social issues contemporary at the time of writing, including the Cold War, Vietnam War and the contemporary controversial research of individuals' response to authority conducted by psychologist Stanley Milgram. Harris applies TA to these issues and concludes his book with the hope that nations will soon gain the maturity to engage in Adult to Adult dialogue, rather than conducting diplomacy in the collective archaic ego states of Parent or Child, which he sees as causing war and disharmony.

== Editions ==
The book was published first during 1969 in the United States by Harper & Row, then republished as I'm OK- You're OK (ISBN 0-380-00772-X). In the United Kingdom it was published first during 1970 by Jonathan Cape with the title The Book of Choice. It is still in print, published by HarperCollins.

== Criticism ==
The work of Wilder Penfield concerning human memory, which appeared to Harris to give TA special credibility because it implied a direct association with neuroscience, has not proved readily repeatable. A 2008 study explored the role of the insula in value judgments, which some interpret as providing neurological context for aspects of Harris's theories, though direct correlations remain subject to further research.

Harris's assertion that a child does not mature with the life position I'm OK – You're OK without therapy has been criticised as positioning TA as a quasi-religious soteriology. Harris' assertion that all children start out with an I'm not OK, You're OK life position was contested by his friend Eric Berne, the originator of TA, who believed that the natural state of a child was feeling I'm OK, You're OK. Several decades have elapsed since Harris published I'm OK, You're OK, some of the cultural references are less accessible to contemporary readers not familiar with the period.

== Influence on popular culture ==
The title of the book has since become commonly used, often as a dismissive categorization of all popular psychology philosophies as being overly accepting. Examples of the influence elsewhere are:

- The David Bowie song Up the Hill Backwards has the refrain "I'm OK, you're so-so", in reference to his mindset and struggles arising from his divorce from Angela Bowie.
- Wendy Kaminer wrote a critique of the self-help business during 1992, named I'm Dysfunctional, You're Dysfunctional.
- In the popular television show ALF, season four, episode five ALF takes on the topic of TA with direct reference to OKness, and even says to Willie, "I'm OK, You're OK".
- In the comedy Airplane II: The Sequel, the case carried by the bomber also contains a copy of "I'm Alright, You're Alright".
- It is also referenced in a Kannada movie called Beladingala Baale. The main character explains this to his friend's wife when she asks him why her husband is open and different—A person grows in four stages: first he thinks I'm ok, the world is not ok; second he feels he's not ok, the world is not ok; third he thinks he's not ok, the world is ok; in the end at the fourth stage he realizes that I'm ok, the world is also ok and she should bring her husband to this fourth stage.
- In an episode of The Simpsons, the character Dr. Marvin Monroe refers to his self-help book I'm OK, You're Sick and Twisted.
- In the first episode of the fifth season of What We Do in the Shadows, the character Nandor talks about working through his anger issues with the book. Throughout the episode, he ends conversations with people saying "I'm okay, you're okay," despite it often being a non sequitur.
- The second half of the 13th episode of Taz-Mania is titled "I'm Okay, You're Taz"

== See also ==
- Games People Play
