= O Jerusalem! =

1971 history book by Larry Collins and Dominique Lapierre

- Author: Dominique Lapierre and Larry Collins
- Genre: History
- Publisher: Simon & Schuster
- Publication date: 1971
- ISBN: 0-671-66241-4

O Jerusalem! is a history book published in 1971 by Dominique Lapierre and Larry Collins that seeks to capture the events surrounding the creation of Israel, and the subsequent expulsion and flight of Palestinians.

== Introduction ==
The book is the result of two years of research by the authors, which consisted of several thousand interviews, and an examination of a series of publicly available documents and relevant materials. These became the basic materials for presenting the story of the birth of the modern state of Israel, as well a crucial early reader into the circumstances surrounding the creation of the Palestinian refugee crisis.

== Presentation ==
The book has forty-six chapters which was grouped into four parts:

- Part One: A Time to Mourn and a Time to Dance has six chapters.
- Part Two: A House Against Itself has eleven chapters.
- Part Three: A City Besieged has thirteen chapters.
- Part Four: A City Divided has sixteen chapters.

== Film adaptation ==
In 2006, the book was adapted into a film of the same name by director Élie Chouraqui.
