= Dominique Lapierre =

French writer (1931–2022)

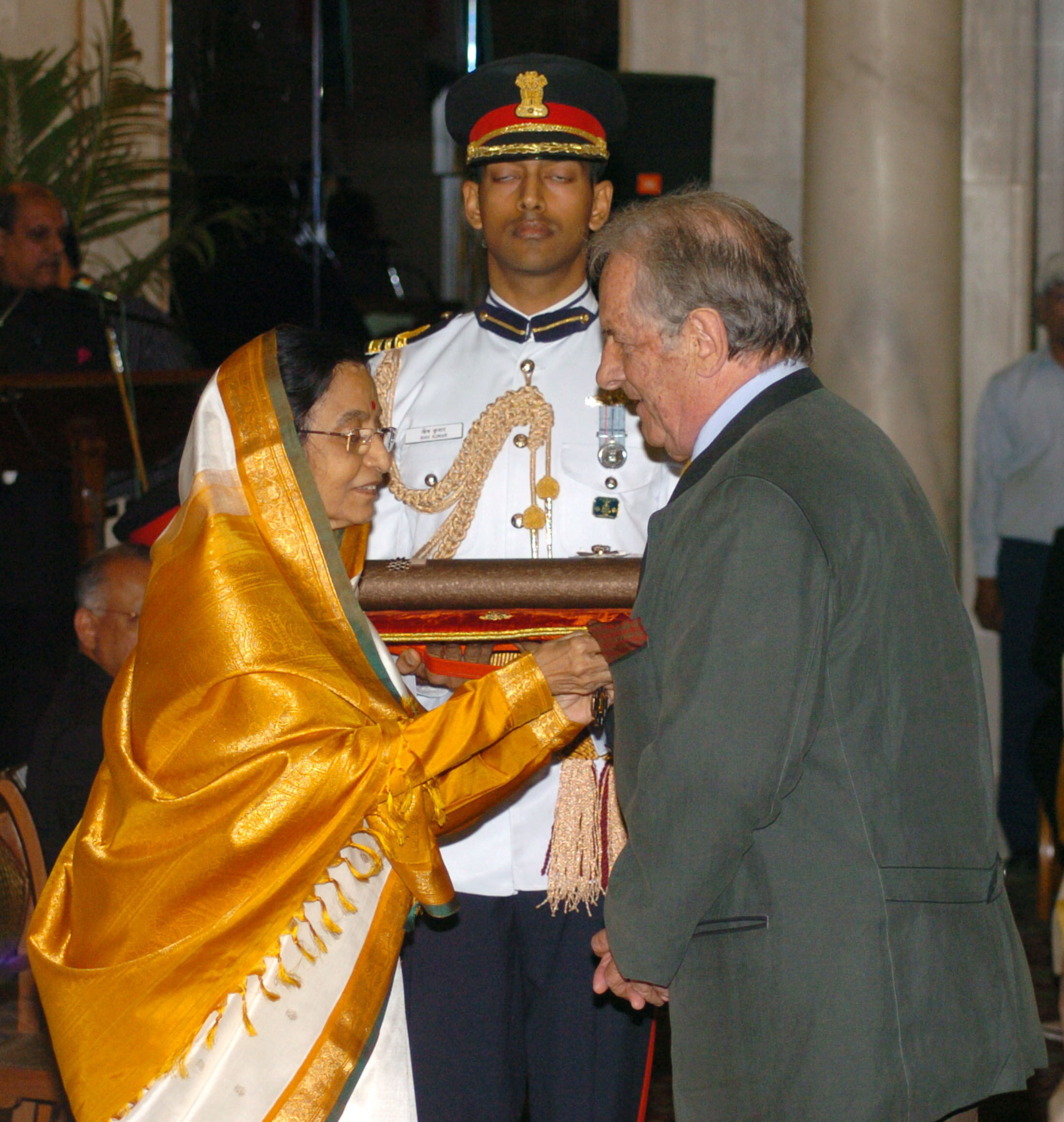
- Lapierre being awarded the Padma Bhushan by President of India Pratibha Patil in 2008
- Born: 30 July 1931; Châtelaillon, Charente-Maritime, France
- Died: 2 December 2022 (aged 91); Saint-Tropez, France

Academic background
- Education: Lafayette College

Academic work
- Notable works: Freedom at Midnight (1975); City of Joy (1985)

Signature of Dominique Lapierre

Dominique Lapierre (30 July 1931 – 2 December 2022) was a French author.

== Life ==
Dominique Lapierre was born in Châtelaillon-Plage, Charente-Maritime, France. At the age of thirteen, he travelled to the U.S. with his father who was a diplomat (Consul General of France). He attended the Jesuit school in New Orleans and became a paper boy for the New Orleans Item. He developed interests in travelling, writing and cars.

Lapierre renovated a 1927 Nash that his mother gave him and decided to travel across the United States during his summer holidays. To earn his way he painted mail boxes. Later, he received a scholarship to study the Aztec civilization in Mexico. He hitch-hiked throughout the U.S. living an adventurous existence, wrote articles, washed windows in churches, gave lectures, and even found a job as a siren cleaner on a boat returning to Europe. One day a truck driver who picked him up on the road to Chicago stole his suitcase. He found the driver before the police did. The Chicago Tribune paid him $100 for his exclusive story. His twenty thousand miles of adventure beginning with just thirty dollars in his pocket led to his first book A Dollar for a Thousand Kilometers. It became one of the best sellers of postwar France and other European countries.

== Early work ==
When Lapierre was eighteen, he received a Fulbright Scholarship to study economics at Lafayette College in Easton, Pennsylvania, where he was graduated in 1952. That year he bought a 1937 Chrysler convertible for $30 and fell in love with a fashion editor. They were married in New York City Hall on his 21st birthday and drove to Mexico in the old Chrysler for their honeymoon. With only $300 in their pockets, they had just enough to buy gas, sandwiches, and cheap rooms in truckers’ motels. In Los Angeles, they won another $300 in a radio game show for Campbell Soup. The prize included a case of soup, which was their only food for three weeks. Lapierre sold the Chrysler for $400 in San Francisco and bought two tickets on the SS President Cleveland for Japan. The honeymoon lasted for a year. They worked their way across Japan, Hong Kong, Thailand, India, Pakistan, Iran, Turkey and Lebanon. When they returned to France, Lapierre wrote his second book, Honeymoon around the Earth.

== Collaboration with Larry Collins ==
On his return to Paris after his honeymoon, he was conscripted into the French army. After one year in the tank regiment, he was transferred to the SHAPE headquarters to serve as an interpreter. One day in the cafeteria he met a young American corporal, Larry Collins, a Yale graduate and draftee. They became friends instantly. When Collins was discharged he was offered a job with Procter & Gamble. Two days before reporting to the new job, the United Press offered him a job as caption writer at their Paris office, for much less money than offered by Procter & Gamble. Collins took the offer from United Press and was soon picked up by Newsweek to be their correspondent in the Middle East. When Lapierre was discharged, he found work as a reporter for the magazine Paris Match. Collins became the godfather of the Lapierres' first child, Alexandra. On several occasions, Collins and Lapierre met while on assignment. In spite of their friendship they had to compete with each other for stories. But they decided to join forces to tell a big story which would appeal to both French and anglophone audiences. Their first bestseller Is Paris Burning? sold close to ten million copies in thirty languages. In this book they mixed the modern technique of investigation journalism with the classical methods of historical research.

Following publication of the book, Lapierre appeared as himself on the June 14, 1965 episode of CBS gameshow To Tell the Truth, receiving two of four possible votes.

After that they spent four years in Jerusalem to reconstruct the birth of the State of Israel for the book O Jerusalem!. Lapierre remarked that he knew each alley, square, street, and building in Jerusalem intimately.

Two of Lapierre's books – Is Paris Burning? (co-written with Larry Collins) and City of Joy – have been made into films. Lapierre and Collins wrote several other books together, the last being Is New York Burning? (2005), before Collins' death in 2005.

Lapierre spoke fluent Bengali.

== City of Joy Foundation and other humanitarian causes ==
The City of Joy is about the unsung heroes of the Pilkhana slum in Kolkata. Lapierre donated half the royalties he earned from this book to support several humanitarian projects in Kolkata, including refuge centres for leper and polio children, dispensaries, schools, rehabilitation workshops, education programs, sanitary actions, and hospital boats. To process and channel the charitable funds he founded an association called Action aid for Calcutta lepers' children (registered in France under the official name of Action pour les enfants des lépreux de Calcutta). Aware of the corruption in India, he organized all his fund transfers to India in such a way as to ensure that the money reaches the right person for the right purpose. His wife since 1980, Dominique Conchon-Lapierre, was his partner in the City of Joy Foundation.

The royalties from Five Past Midnight in Bhopal go to the Sambhavna clinic in Bhopal which provides free medical treatment to the victims of the 1984 Union Carbide Bhopal disaster. Lapierre also funded a primary school in Oriya Basti, one of the settlements described in Five Past Midnight in Bhopal.

== Passion for cars and travelling ==
At the age of six, he developed a passion for automobiles. Each summer, while at his grandparents' Atlantic coast beach house, he marvelled at the wonders of his uncle's American cars. When he was a Fulbright exchange student at Lafayette College, he bought, for thirty dollars, a convertible Chrysler Royal he found in a junkyard. Forty-five years later, he saw a photograph of the same Chrysler in a French vintage car magazine. The automobile was about to be auctioned in Poitiers. He rushed to the auction, made a bid, and won it. When he was a student at the University of Paris, he acquired an old Amil car, which he and a classmate drove all the way to Ankara, Turkey. He has told stories about how he drove the car in reverse to have enough torque to get through the mountain passes. Later, in a Rolls-Royce he bought on his fortieth birthday, he drove from Bombay to Saint Tropez via Pakistan, Afghanistan, Iran and Turkey.

== Death ==
Lapierre died on 2 December 2022, at the age of 91.

== Awards ==
Lapierre was awarded the Padma Bhushan, India's third highest civilian award in the 2008 Republic Day honours list.

== Bibliography ==
=== Novels ===
- The Fifth Horseman (Le Cinquième Cavalier) (1980), with Larry Collins, ISBN 0-671-24316-0
- The City of Joy (La Cité de la joie) (1985), ISBN 0-385-18952-4
- Beyond Love (Plus grands que l'amour) (1990), ISBN 0-446-51438-1
- Is New York Burning? (New-York brûle-t-il?) (2005), with Larry Collins, ISBN 1-59777-520-7

=== Non-fiction ===
Autobiographies

- A Thousand Suns (Mille soleil) (1999), memoir, ISBN 0-446-52535-9
- India mon amour (Inde ma bien-aimée) (2010), memoir, ISBN 978-8-8428-1681-2

Biographies

- Chessman Told Me (Chessman m'a dit) (1960)
- Or I'll Dress You in Mourning (...Ou tu porteras mon deuil) (1968), with Larry Collins

History

- Is Paris Burning? (Paris brûle-t-il?) (1965), with Larry Collins, ISBN 9780785812463
- O Jerusalem! (Ô Jérusalem) (1972), with Larry Collins, ISBN 0-671-21163-3
- Freedom at Midnight (Cette nuit la liberté) (1975), with Larry Collins, ISBN 0-671-22088-8
- Five Past Midnight in Bhopal (Il était minuit cinq à Bhopal) (2001), with Javier Moro, ISBN 0-446-53088-3
- A Rainbow in the Night: The Tumultuous Birth of South Africa (Un arc-en-ciel dans la nuit) (2008), ISBN 978-1-4332-9156-2

Travels

- A Dollar for a Thousand Miles (Un dollar les mille kilomètres) (1949)
- Once Upon a Time in The Soviet Union (Il était une fois l'URSS) (2005) with Jean-Pierre Pedrazzini, ISBN 978-81-216-1247-0 — chronicles a 1956 journey he took across the Soviet Union with Jean-Pierre Pedrazzini
- Honeymoon around the Earth (Lune de miel autour de la Terre) (2005)

== Adaptations ==
- Is Paris Burning? (1966), film directed by René Clément, based on book Is Paris Burning?
- City of Joy (1992), film directed by Roland Joffé, based on novel City of Joy
- A cloud over Bhopal (2001), documentary directed by Gerardo Olivares and Larry Levene, based on book Five Past Midnight in Bhopal
- O Jerusalem (film) in 2006 by Elie Chouraqui
- Viceroy's House (2017), film directed by Gurinder Chadha, based on book Freedom at Midnight
