= Larry Collins (writer) =

American writer and historian (1929–2005)

John Lawrence Collins Jr. (September 14, 1929 – June 20, 2005) was an American writer and historian.

== Life ==
Born in West Hartford, Connecticut, Collins was educated at the Loomis Chaffee Institute in Windsor, Connecticut, and graduated from Yale as a BA in 1951. He worked in the advertising department of Procter and Gamble, in Cincinnati, Ohio, before being conscripted into the US Army. While serving in the public affairs office of the Allied Headquarters in Paris, from 1953 to 1955, he met Dominique Lapierre with whom he would write several best-sellers over 43 years.

He went back to Procter and Gamble and became the products manager of the new foods division in 1955. Disillusioned with commerce, he took to journalism and joined the Paris bureau of United Press International in 1956, and became the news editor in Rome in the following year, and later the MidEast bureau chief in Beirut.

In 1959, he joined Newsweek as Middle East editor, based in New York City. He became the Paris bureau chief in 1961, where he would work until 1964, until he switched to writing books.

In 1965, Collins and Dominique Lapierre published their first joint work, Is Paris Burning? (in French Paris brûle-t-il?), a tale of Nazi occupation of the French capital during World War II and Hitler's plans to destroy Paris should it fall into the hands of the Allies. The book was an instant success and was made into a movie in 1966 by director René Clément, starring Kirk Douglas, Glenn Ford and Alain Delon.

In 1967, they co-authored Or I'll Dress you in Mourning about the Spanish bullfighter Manuel Benítez El Cordobés.

In 1972, after five years' research and interviews, they published O Jerusalem! about the birth of Israel in 1948, turned into a movie by Elie Chouraqui.

In 1975, they published Freedom at Midnight, a story of the Indian Independence in 1947, and the subsequent assassination of Mahatma Gandhi in 1948.

The duo published their first fictional work, The Fifth Horseman, in 1981. It describes a terrorist attack on New York masterminded by Libya's Colonel Gaddafi. The book had such a shocking effect that the French President cancelled the sale of nuclear reactors to Libya, even though it was meant for peaceful purposes. Paramount Pictures, which was planning a film based on the book, dropped the idea in fear that fanatics would emulate the scenario in real life.

In 1985, Collins authored Fall from Grace (without Lapierre) about a woman agent sent into occupied France who realizes she may be betrayed by her British masters if necessary. He also wrote Maze: A Novel (1989), and Black Eagles (1992), a semi-fictional novel about two conflicted American agents in Manuel Noriega’s Panama. He also wrote Le Jour Du Miracle: D-Day Paris (1994) and Tomorrow Belongs To Us (1998). Shortly before his death, he collaborated with Lapierre on Is New York Burning? (2005), a novel mixing fictional characters and real-life figures that speculates about a terrorist attack on New York City.

In 2005, while working from his home in Fréjus, France, on a book about the Middle East, Collins died of a sudden cerebral hemorrhage.

== Personal life ==
In 1966, Collins married Nadia Sultan. They had two sons.

== Awards ==
Collins won the Deauville American Film Festival literary award in 1985, and the Mannesman Talley literary prize in 1989.

== Works ==
=== Novels ===
- The Fifth Horseman (Le Cinquième Cavalier) (1980), with Dominique Lapierre, ISBN 0-671-24316-0
- Fall from Grace (Fortitude) (1985)
- Maze (Dédale) (1989)
- Black Eagles (Les aigles noirs) (1993)
- Tomorrow Belongs To Us (Demain est à nous) (1998)
- The Road to Armageddon (2003)
- Is New York Burning? (New-York brûle-t-il?) (2005), with Dominique Lapierre, ISBN 1-59777-520-7

=== Non-fiction ===
Biographies

- Or I'll Dress You in Mourning (...Ou tu porteras mon deuil) (1968), with Dominique Lapierre

History

- Is Paris Burning? (Paris brûle-t-il?) (1965), with Dominique Lapierre, ISBN 9780785812463
- O Jerusalem! (Ô Jérusalem) (1972), with Dominique Lapierre, ISBN 0-671-21163-3
- Freedom at Midnight (Cette nuit la liberté) (1975), with Dominique Lapierre, ISBN 0-671-22088-8
- The Secrets of D-Day (Le Jour Du Miracle: D-Day Paris) (1994)

== Adaptations ==
- Is Paris Burning? (1966), film directed by René Clément, based on book Is Paris Burning?
- Fall from Grace (1994), telefilm directed by Waris Hussein, based on novel Fall from Grace
- Viceroy's House (2017), film directed by Gurinder Chadha, based on book Freedom at Midnight
