= List of honorary citizens of Bucharest =

The title of Honorary Citizen of Bucharest is the highest civic distinction, which rewards the talent and the special contributions of a person, Romanian or foreign, granted by the General Council of Bucharest. The title is granted, as the case may be, at the initiative of the Mayor General or the members of the General Council of Bucharest. The first person rewarded with this distinction was soprano Mariana Nicolesco in 1991.

Year	Name	Portrait	Comments	Country	Ref.
1991	Mariana Nicolesco (born 1948)		Soprano and honorary member of the Romanian Academy, named UNESCO Artist for Peace and UNESCO Goodwill Ambassador	Romania	
1992	George Emil Palade (1912–2008)		Physician and scientist, awarded the Nobel Prize in Physiology or Medicine in 1974	Romania/United States	
1992	Viorica Cortez (born 1935)		Mezzo-soprano	Romania/France	
1992	Ileana Cotrubaș (1939–2026)		Soprano	Romania	
1992	Marina Krilovici (born 1942)		Soprano	Romania	
1992	Ionel Pantea		Opera singer and stage director, distinguished with the Order of Merit of the Grand Duchy of Luxembourg	Romania	
1994	National football team, coaches, doctor and president of the Romanian Football Federation		Quarterfinalist in the 1994 FIFA World Cup	Romania	
1994	Nadia Comăneci (born 1961)		Gymnast, first gymnast to be awarded a perfect score of 10 in an Olympic event and first Romanian sportswoman included in the International Gymnastics Hall of Fame	Romania/United States	
1995	Ion Irimescu (1903–2005)		Sculptor, professor and honorary member of the Romanian Academy	Romania	
1995	Knights of the Order of Michael the Brave			Romania	
1996	Paul Călinescu (1902–2000)		Director and screenwriter	Romania	
1996	Marin Sorescu (1936–1996)		Writer and Minister of Culture (1993–1995), member of the Romanian Academy and laureate of the Herder Prize	Romania	
1997	Pierre Mauroy (1928–2013)		Mayor of Lille (1973–2001) and Prime Minister of France (1981–1984)	France	
1997	Ion Voicu (1923–1997)		Violinist and director of George Enescu Philharmonic Orchestra	Romania	
1997	Dumitrașcu Lăcătușu (1891–1999)		Last Romanian veteran of the First World War	Romania	
1997	Livia S. Sylva		Holocaust survivor, cosmetic designer and commissioner of New York City Commission for the United Nations, Consular Corps and Protocol	Romania/United States	
1997	Bill Clinton (born 1946)		President of the United States (1993–2001)	United States	
1997	Jacques Chirac (1932 - 2019)		President of France (1995–2007)	France	
1997	Gabriela Szabo (born 1975)		Olympic athlete and Minister of Youth and Sports (2014–2015), named in 1999 the world's best athlete	Romania	
1997	Nicolae Herlea (1927–2014)		Baritone	Romania	
1998	Liviu Ciulei (1923–2011)		Director, actor, scenographer, architect, professor and corresponding member of the Romanian Academy	Romania	
1998	Nursultan Nazarbayev (born 1940)		President of Kazakhstan (1991–present)	Kazakhstan	
2000	Gold, silver and bronze medalists at the 2000 Summer Olympics			Romania	
2001	Migry Avram Nicolau		Stage director	Romania	
2001	Tiberiu Simionescu		Founding member of the Ion Dacian National Theater of Operetta and Musical	Romania	
2001	Nicolae Ionescu-Dodo		Founding member of the Ion Dacian National Theater of Operetta and Musical	Romania	
2001	George Zaharescu (1927–2007)		Opera director, director of the Ion Dacian National Theater of Operetta and Musical	Romania	
2001	Iolanda Balaș (1936–2016)		Olympic athlete, president of the Romanian Athletics Federation (1988–2005)	Romania	
2001	Radu Beligan (1918–2016)		Actor and honorary member of the Romanian Academy	Romania	
2001	Gheorghe Dinică (1934–2009)		Actor	Romania	
2001	Marin Moraru (1937–2016)		Actor	Romania	
2001	Tamara Buciuceanu (1929–2019)		Actress	Moldova/Romania	
2001	Carmen Stănescu (1925–2018)		Actress	Romania	
2001	Damian Crâșmaru (1931–2019)		Actor	Romania	
2001	Mircea Albulescu (1934–2016)		Actor, professor, publicist, poet and writer	Romania	
2001	Olga Tudorache (1929–2017)		Actress and professor	Romania	
2001	Marcela Rusu (1926–2002)		Actress	Romania	
2001	Ion Zamfirescu (1907–2001)		Theater historian and professor	Romania	
2001	Ileana Berlogea (1931–2002)		Theater historian, professor and critic	Romania	
2001	Ion Toboșaru (1930–2016)		Film critic, esthetician and theatrologist	Romania	
2001	Horea Popescu (1925–2010)		Director	Romania	
2001	Margareta Niculescu (1926–2018)		Puppetteer, professor, director and theater director	Romania	
2001	Dinu Săraru (born 1932)		Theater director, playwright, essayist, publicist, novelist and writer	Romania	
2001	Ștefan Iordache (1941–2008)		Actor	Romania	
2001	Dan Iordăchescu (1930–2015)		Baritone	Romania	
2001	Adela Mărculescu (born 1938)		Actress	Romania	
2001	Draga Olteanu Matei (1933–2020)		Actress	Romania	
2001	Ludovic Spiess (1938–2006)		Tenor, Minister of Culture (1991–1992) and director of the Romanian National Opera (2001–2005)	Romania	
2001	Florin Piersic (born 1936)		Actor	Romania	
2001	Gheorghe Zamfir (born 1941)		Musician and composer, self-described "master of the pan flute"	Romania	
2001	Veta Biriș (born 1949)		Folk music singer	Romania	
2001	Achim Nica (1930–2012)		Folk music singer	Romania	
2001	Maria Butaciu (1940–2018)		Folk music singer	Romania	
2001	Sava Negrean Brudașcu (born 1947)		Folk music singer	Romania	
2001	Floarea Calotă (born 1956)		Folk music singer	Romania	
2001	Matilda Pascal Cojocărița (born 1958)		Folk music singer	Romania	
2001	Liviu Dafinescu (1954–2004)		Director of Doina Gorjului Folklore Ensemble (1994–2004)	Romania	
2001	Valeria Peter Predescu (1947–2009)		Folk music singer	Romania	
2001	Dumitru Fărcaș (1938–2018)		Tárogató player	Romania	
2001	Benone Sinulescu (1937–2021)		Folk music singer	Romania	
2001	Viorica Flintașu (born 1939)		Folk music singer	Romania	
2001	Elise Stan		TV producer	Romania	
2001	Nicolae Furdui Iancu (born 1955)		Folk music singer	Romania	
2001	Floarea Tănăsescu		Folk music singer	Romania	
2001	Laura Lavric (born 1946)		Folk music singer	Romania	
2001	Gheorghe Turda (born 1948)		Folk music singer	Romania	
2001	Grigore Leșe (born 1954)		Folk music singer and bassoon player	Romania	
2001	Liviu Vasilică (1950–2004)		Folk music singer and pediatrician	Romania	
2001	Ion Luican (1907–1992)		Folk music singer	Romania	
2001	Sofia Vicoveanca (born 1941)		Folk music singer, poet and actress	Ukraine/Romania	
2005	Stela Popescu (1935–2017)		Actress	Moldova/Romania	
2006	Cristian Gațu (born 1945)		Olympic handball player and president of the Romanian Handball Federation (1996–2014)	Romania	
2006	Marcel Guguianu (1922–2012)		Sculptor	Romania	
2006	David Esrig (born 1935)		Professor and theater director	Israel/Romania	
2007	Lucian Giurchescu (born 1930)		Director	Romania	
2007	Tudor Petrov-Popa (born 1963)		Politician, fighter for the territorial integrity of Moldova during the Transnistria War	Moldova	
2007	Andrei Ivanțoc (born 1961)		Politician, fighter for the territorial integrity of Moldova during the Transnistria War and political prisoner of the separatist regime in Tiraspol	Moldova	
2007	Alexandru Leșco (born 1955)		Politician, fighter for the territorial integrity of Moldova during the Transnistria War	Moldova	
2008	Rică Răducanu (born 1946)		Footballer, played in Romania national football team at the 1970 FIFA World Cup	Romania	
2009	Horia Damian (1922–2012)		Painter and honorary member of the Romanian Academy	Romania/France	
2014	Larisa Iordache (born 1996)		Olympic gymnast	Romania	
2016	Maria Popa		Professor	Romania	
2016	Neagu Djuvara (1916–2018)		Historian, diplomat, philosopher, journalist and novelist	Romania	
2016	Members of the women's handball team – CSM București		Winner of the 2015–16 Women's EHF Champions League	Romania	
2016	Members of the women's volleyball team – CSM București		Winner of the 2015–16 CEV Women's Challenge Cup	Romania	
2016	Members of Romania's sword team		Gold medalist at the 2016 Summer Olympics	Romania	
2017	Cristian Țopescu (1937–2018)		Sports commentator, journalist and politician	Romania	
2017	Dinu C. Giurescu (1927–2018)		Historian, politician and member of the Romanian Academy	Romania	
2017	Herman Berkovits (born 1947)		Benjamin Netanyahu's personal physician and Viorica Dăncilă's honorary counselor	Romania/Israel	
2017	Cătălin Badiu		Cardiovascular surgeon	Romania	
2017	Cătălina Ponor (born 1987)		Olympic gymnast	Romania	
2017	Marian Drăgulescu (born 1980)		Olympic gymnast	Romania	
2017	Ileana Vulpescu (1932–2021)		Philologist, lexicographer, writer, novelist and translator	Romania	
2017	Alexandru Arșinel (born 1939)		Actor and director of Constantin Tănase Revue Theater	Romania	
2017	Ilie Ilașcu (born 1952)		Politician and political prisoner of the separatist regime in Tiraspol	Moldova/Romania	
2017	Mircea Lucescu (born 1945)		Footballer and selector of Romania and Turkey national football teams	Romania	
2017	Cristina Neagu (born 1988)		Professional handball player, the only handball player in history to win three IHF World Player of the Year awards	Romania	
2017	Angela Gheorghiu (born 1965)		Soprano, one of the most famous opera singers in the world	Romania	
2017	Alexandra Nechita (born 1985)		Painter and muralist, dubbed "little Picasso"	Romania/United States	
2017	Simona Halep (born 1991)		Professional tennis player, first Romanian tenniswoman to become world No. 1 on the WTA Tour	Romania	
2017	Ion Caramitru (born 1942)		Actor, Minister of Culture (1996–2000), president of UNITER (1990–present) and director of Ion Luca Caragiale National Theater (2005–present)	Romania	
2017	Helmut Duckadam (born 1959)		Footballer and president of FC Steaua București	Romania	
2017	Dorin Petruț		Lieutenant colonel injured in Camp Victory in 2007 and professional archer	Romania	
2017	Daniel Porumb (born 1980)		Sergeant injured in Iraq in April 2007	Romania	
2017	Eugen Valentin Pătru		Corporal injured in Afghanistan in March 2014	Romania	
