= Simona Halep =

Romanian tennis player (born 1991)

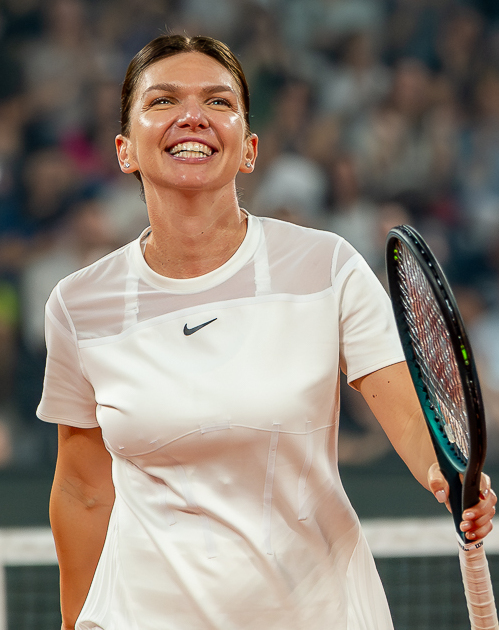
- Halep in 2026
- Country (sports): Romania
- Residence: Bucharest, Romania
- Born: 27 September 1991 (age 35) Constanța, Romania
- Height: 1.68 m (5 ft 6 in)
- Turned pro: 26 June 2006
- Retired: 4 February 2025
- Plays: Right-handed (two-handed backhand)
- Prize money: US$40,236,618: 5th all-time in earnings
- Official website: simonahalep.com

Singles
- Career record: 580–243 (70.5%)
- Career titles: 24
- Highest ranking: No. 1 (9 October 2017)

Grand Slam singles results
- Australian Open: F (2018)
- French Open: W (2018)
- Wimbledon: W (2019)
- US Open: SF (2015)

Other tournaments
- Tour Finals: F (2014)
- Olympic Games: 1R (2012)

Doubles
- Career record: 67–72 (48.2%)
- Career titles: 1
- Highest ranking: No. 71 (15 May 2017)

Grand Slam doubles results
- Australian Open: 1R (2011, 2012, 2013, 2014, 2021, 2022)
- French Open: 2R (2012)
- Wimbledon: 1R (2011, 2012, 2013, 2015)
- US Open: 2R (2011)

Grand Slam mixed doubles results
- US Open: QF (2015)

Team competitions
- Fed Cup: SF (2019), record 22–10

Simona Halep (Romanian pronunciation: [siˈmona haˈlep]; born 27 September 1991) is a Romanian former professional tennis player. She was ranked as the world No. 1 in women's singles by the Women's Tennis Association (WTA) for 64 weeks, including as the year-end No. 1 in 2017 and 2018. Halep won 25 WTA Tour–level titles, including two majors at the 2018 French Open and the 2019 Wimbledon Championships.

A French Open junior champion and former junior world No. 1, Halep first broke into the world's top 50 at the end of 2011, the top 20 in August 2013, and the top 10 in January 2014. She won her first six WTA titles in the same season in 2013, the first to do so since Steffi Graf in 1986. This led to her being named the WTA Most Improved Player of the year. Halep finished runner-up at three majors—the 2014 French Open, 2017 French Open, and 2018 Australian Open—before winning her first major title at the 2018 French Open. Halep also finished runner-up at the 2014 WTA Finals to Serena Williams, whom she went on to defeat to claim the 2019 Wimbledon Championships. From 27 January 2014 to 8 August 2021, Halep was ranked in the top 10 for 373 consecutive weeks, the eighth-longest streak in WTA history. During this seven-year span, she finished each year ranked within the world's top four.

Halep was suspended from the WTA Tour in October 2022 after testing positive for a banned substance. In February 2024 the ban was reduced from 4 years to 9 months, already served, and she returned to the tour at the 2024 Miami Open. She retired from the sport in 2025.

Halep was regarded as one of the best returners on the WTA Tour, building her game around controlled aggression and being able to hit winners from defensive positions. She was named the WTA Most Popular Player of the Year in 2014 and 2015, as well as the WTA Fan Favorite Singles Player of the Year in 2017, 2018, and 2019. She is a recipient of the Patriarchal Cross of Romania and the Order of the Star of Romania, and was named an honorary citizen of Bucharest. Halep is the third Romanian to reach the top 10 of the WTA rankings, after Virginia Ruzici and Irina Spîrlea, and the second Romanian woman to win a major singles title after Ruzici. She is the first Romanian woman to be ranked world No. 1 and the first Romanian to win a Wimbledon singles title.

== Early life and background ==
Simona Halep was born on 27 September 1991 in Constanța, Romania to Stere and Tania Halep, who are of Aromanian descent from the town of Sochos near Thessaloniki, Greece. She has a brother Nicolae who is five and a half years older. Halep's father played lower-division football for AS Săgeata Stejaru and worked as a zootechnics technician before becoming the owner of a dairy products factory. He developed an interest in supporting his children's athletic ventures as a consequence of wondering how far he would have progressed as a footballer if his parents could have provided him with more financial support when he was growing up. When Halep was four years old, she started playing tennis after attending one of her brother's training sessions. Although her brother stopped playing the sport after a few years, Halep began practising twice a week until she was six, from which point on she practiced daily. Although she focused on tennis, she also played football and handball while growing up. Growing up in Constanța, she routinely trained on the beaches and in the water of the Black Sea. As a teenager, she was partly sponsored by Corneliu Idu, the owner of the leading tennis club in Constanța. When Halep was sixteen, she moved away from her family to train in Bucharest.

== Junior years ==
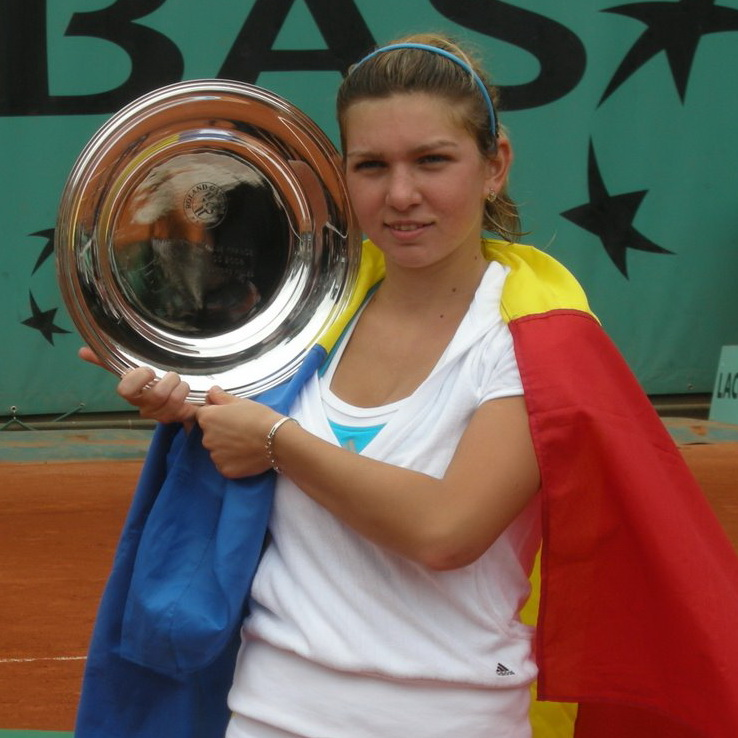
Halep with the junior French Open trophy in 2008

Halep is a former world No. 1 junior. She began playing on the ITF Junior Circuit in 2005 at the age of 13 and finished runner-up at the low-level Grade 4 (Note: Higher-level junior tournaments have lower grade numbers, from Grade 5 to Grade 1. Grade A is the highest, and the only level above Grade 1.) Mamaia-Sen Junior ITF Tournament in Romania in her second career event. The following year, Halep won all four ITF singles events she entered, including the Mamaia-Sen tournament which was reclassified to mid-level Grade 3. She also represented Romania at the Junior Fed Cup that year alongside Irina-Camelia Begu and Andreea Mitu. The team finished in ninth place. Halep moved up to higher-level events in 2007 and won her first and only Grade 1 title at the Perin Memorial in Umag in April. She also made her junior Grand Slam debut that year, losing in the third round at the French Open, Wimbledon, and the US Open.

Halep improved her junior Grand Slam performance in 2008, her last year on the junior tour. She entered just four events that year. In Australia, she finished runner-up to Arantxa Rus at Nottinghill and then lost to Australian Jessica Moore in the semifinals of the Australian Open. After focusing on professional tournaments, Halep returned to the junior circuit in May and won her first Grade A title at the Trofeo Bonfiglio without dropping a set. She then finished her junior career by winning her only junior Grand Slam title at the French Open. As the ninth seed, she defeated the fifth-seed Moore and the second-seed Rus en route to reaching the final without losing a set. Halep defeated compatriot Elena Bogdan in three sets in the final to become the second Romanian girl to win a junior Grand Slam singles title after Mariana Simionescu won the 1974 French Open. With the title, she also became the top-ranked junior in the world.

== Professional tour ==
=== 2006–10: Top 100 debut ===
Halep turned pro in 2006 and started her professional career playing low-level ITF Women's Circuit events in Romania in 2006 and 2007. She won both her first two ITF singles and doubles titles in back-to-back weeks in Bucharest in May 2007. After accomplishing this feat a third time the following year, Halep won her first $25k singles title in Sweden in June 2008. She began playing more higher-level events once she finished her junior career, reaching a $50k final in 2009 in Makarska. Halep also attempted to qualify for WTA events twice that year, losing in the second qualifying round at both the Open GdF Suez and the French Open. Towards the end of the season, she defeated No. 96 Angelique Kerber for her first top 100 victory and also reached the semifinals of a $50k event in Minsk to make her debut in the top 200 of the WTA rankings.

Halep made her WTA Tour main-draw debut in April 2010, qualifying for three consecutive events. In her first tournament, she reached the quarterfinals at the Andalucia Tennis Experience, defeating compatriot and world No. 36, Sorana Cîrstea, before losing to No. 16 Flavia Pennetta. At her third event, Halep made her first career final, finishing runner-up at the Morocco Open to Iveta Benešová. This success helped her rise from No. 166 at the beginning of April to No. 110 in the first set of rankings in May. Later that month, Halep made her Grand Slam debut at the French Open, losing her opening round match in straight sets to No. 7 Samantha Stosur after reaching the main draw through qualifying. After losing in qualifying at Wimbledon, Halep made her top 100 debut in July following a semifinal at the $100k Open de Biarritz. With her rise in the rankings, she was directly accepted into a Grand Slam main draw for the first time at the US Open, where she was drawn against No. 4 Jelena Janković, another top-ten opponent. Unlike at the French Open, Halep won the second set and had a chance to serve for the match at 5–4 in the third, but ultimately lost that game and the match, which lasted two hours and twenty minutes in severe heat. Halep's best result of the year after the US Open was a final at the $100k Torhout Ladies Open, which helped her finish the season with a year-end ranking of No. 81 in the world.

=== 2011–12: Steady ranking, top 50 ===
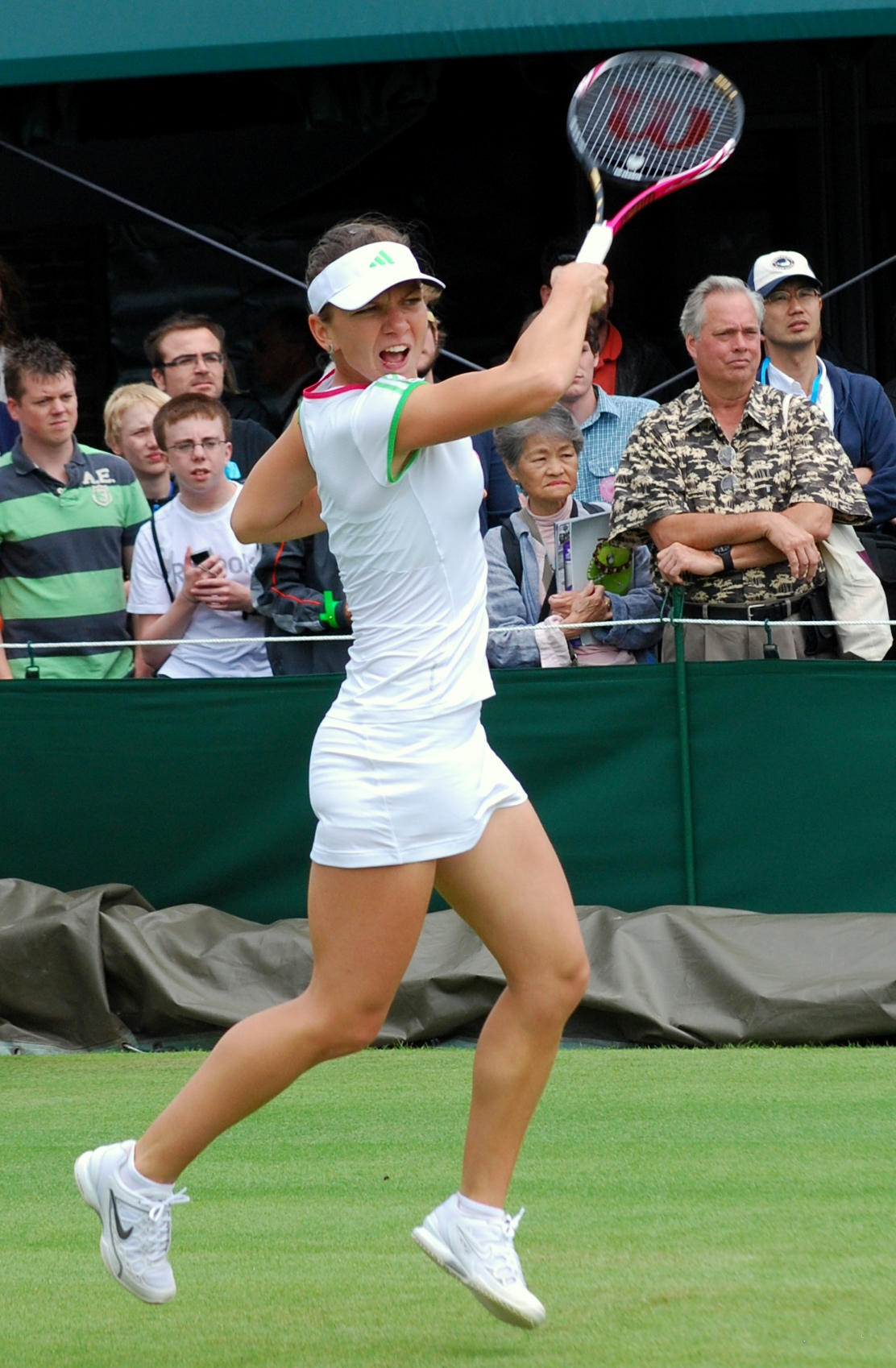
Halep at the 2011 Wimbledon Championships

Halep played almost exclusively WTA Tour events in 2011. She won her first career Grand Slam tournament matches at the Australian Open, defeating Anne Kremer and No. 23 Alisa Kleybanova to reach the third round. During the clay court season, Halep defended her runner-up finish at the Morocco Open from the previous year, again losing in the final, this time to Alberta Brianti. Nonetheless, she struggled in the other clay court tournaments, only recording one more match win, which came in the opening round at the 2011 French Open. She also reached the second round at Wimbledon, losing in three sets to seventh-seed and defending champion Serena Williams. At the 2012 Olympics, she competed in the women's singles, losing in the first round, and the women's doubles, with Sorana Cîrstea, also losing in the first round. During the US Open Series, Halep qualified for the Rogers Cup and recorded her first top 20 victory against No. 15 Svetlana Kuznetsova in the first round. At the US Open, Halep then recorded her first top 10 victory over No. 6 Li Na in her opening match, despite playing with an ankle sprain she suffered at the Rogers Cup. Despite a loss to Carla Suárez Navarro in the next round, this result put Halep in the top 50 for the first time. She finished the year at No. 47 in the world.

Halep maintained a steady ranking throughout 2012, rising no higher than No. 37, falling no lower than No. 63, and finishing the year at No. 47 for the second consecutive year. She won just one Grand Slam singles match all year, which came at the US Open. She won more than two matches at an event just twice, the first at the Morocco Open where she made the semifinals in April and the second at the Brussels Open where she made the final in May. Although Halep defeated top seed Anabel Medina Garrigues in Morocco, she was upset by qualifier Kiki Bertens, who prevented her from reaching a third straight final at the event. The final in Brussels was Halep's first at the Premier level. She defeated No. 21 Jelena Janković and No. 16 Dominika Cibulková, before losing to top seed and world No. 3, Agnieszka Radwańska.

=== 2013: Breakthrough, six WTA Tour titles, world No. 11 ===
Halep had a slow start to the year, only winning multiple matches at a tournament once before May. Her first breakthrough came at the Italian Open, where she reached the semifinals as a qualifier. She defeated three top 20 players at the Premier 5 event, including No. 4 Agnieszka Radwańska, before losing to world No. 1 Serena Williams who was on a 23-match win streak. Halep continued to struggle at the majors, losing in the opening round at both the Australian Open and the French Open, while making the second round at Wimbledon. Nonetheless, she began to dominate the lower level tournaments, winning her first three WTA titles at the International level across June and July. Her first two titles came in back-to-back weeks at the Nuremberg Cup on clay over Andrea Petkovic and at the Rosmalen Grass Court Championships on grass over Kirsten Flipkens. After a third title at the Budapest Grand Prix, she climbed up to No. 23 in the world.

Halep won her fourth title at the New Haven Open, defeating No. 8 Caroline Wozniacki and No. 9 Petra Kvitová in the semifinals and final respectively. This was her first title at the Premier level and put her in the top 20 for the first time. Halep continued her success at the US Open, where she was seeded at a Grand Slam event for the first time at No. 21. She made it to the fourth round, her best result at a Grand Slam event then. Halep won a fifth title at the Premier-level Kremlin Cup, defeating Stosur in the final. At the end of the season, she qualified for the WTA Tournament of Champions, an event for the highest-ranked WTA title-holders who did not qualify for the WTA Finals. Halep won this event as well, defeating No. 16 Ana Ivanovic and No. 19 Stosur in the knockout rounds. With her sixth WTA title, she finished the year at No. 11 in the world and was named the WTA Most Improved Player of the Year. She was second on the tour in singles titles behind only Serena Williams who had 11, and was the first woman to win her first six career titles in the same season since Steffi Graf in 1986. Halep attributed her improvement to developing a more positive mindset, saying, "What changed was that I allowed myself to be relaxed on the court by taking the pressure off. I told myself to enjoy it and play with pleasure."

=== 2014: French Open final, world No. 2 ===
Halep greatly improved her Grand Slam results in 2014. With a victory of No. 8 Jelena Janković, she reached her first Grand Slam quarterfinal at the Australian Open, where she was upset by No. 20 Dominika Cibulková. With this result, Halep made her debut in the top 10 of the WTA rankings. The next month, Halep won her first Premier 5 title at the Qatar Open, defeating three top 10 opponents in the last three rounds, including No. 9 Angelique Kerber in the final. After a semifinal at the Indian Wells Open, she rose to No. 5 in the world, making her the highest-ranked Romanian in the history of the WTA rankings. During the clay court season, Halep reached the two biggest finals of her career to date. She finished runner-up to Maria Sharapova at both the Premier Mandatory Madrid Open and the French Open. She had not lost a set before the French Open final, making her the first woman to reach her maiden Grand Slam final without dropping a set since Martina Hingis at the 1997 Australian Open. Both finals went to three sets, and the French Open final lasted over three hours. With these two runner-ups, Halep moved up to No. 3.

The next month, Halep came close to another major final at Wimbledon, but was upset in the semifinals by No. 13 Eugenie Bouchard after suffering an ankle injury in the first set. Nonetheless, she recovered in time to play inaugural Bucharest Open in her home country of Romania a week later. She won the event for her second and last title of the year, defeating Roberta Vinci in the final. This helped her rise to No. 2 in the world in August. Although she was the second seed at the US Open, she was upset in straight sets by veteran qualifier Mirjana Lučić-Baroni. The next month, she withdrew from the Beijing Open in the quarterfinals due to a hip injury. She did not play another event until the WTA Tour Championships, where she qualified for the first time. Halep won two of three matches in her round robin group to advance to the knockout rounds, defeating No. 5 Eugenie Bouchard and No. 1 Serena Williams before losing her last match to No. 7 Ana Ivanovic. The victory over Williams was her first over a current world No. 1 and was also tied for the most lopsided loss of Williams' career at the time, as Halep held her to just two games. Halep won her semifinal against No. 6 Agnieszka Radwańska to set up a rematch with Williams in the final. In a complete reversal of the round robin match, Williams won the final easily, limiting Halep to just three games. Halep finished the year at No. 3 in the world, behind Williams and Sharapova.

=== 2015: Premier Mandatory title, US Open semifinal ===
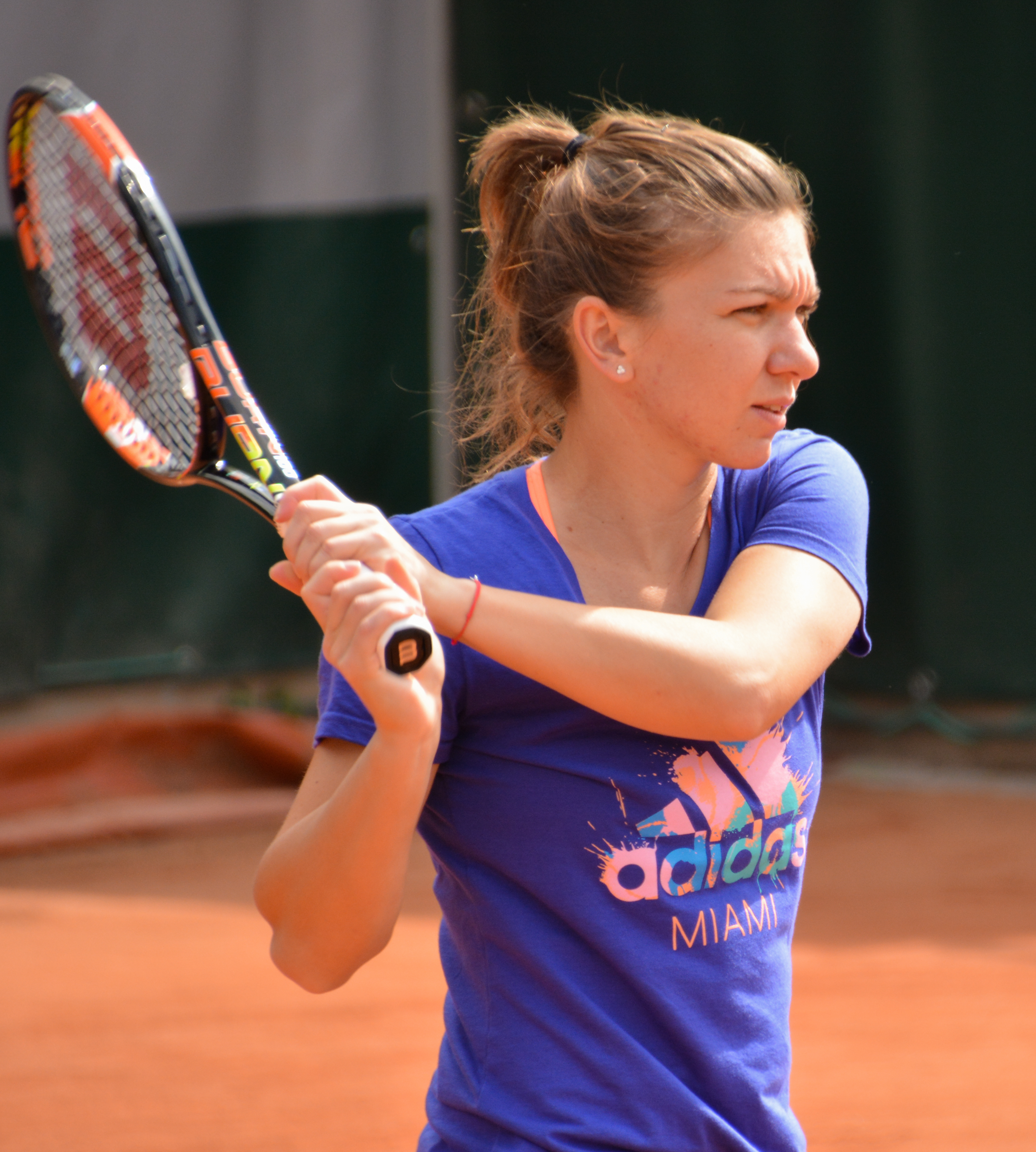
Halep at the 2015 French Open

Halep had a strong start to 2015, reaching at least the quarterfinals in her first six events. After a title in her first event of the year at the Shenzhen Open, she lost in the quarterfinals at the Australian Open for the second straight year, this time to No. 11 Ekaterina Makarova. Nonetheless, Halep rebounded to win her next two events, the Dubai Tennis Championships and the Indian Wells Open. The former was her second Premier 5 title and tenth WTA title in total, while the latter was her first Premier Mandatory title and biggest title to date. She extended her win streak to 14 matches at the Miami Open where she lost in the semifinals to world No. 1, Serena Williams. Halep did not reach any finals during the clay court season, with her best results being two semifinals at the Stuttgart Open and the Italian Open. She was two points away from advancing to the final in Rome, but could not break Carla Suárez Navarro at 5–4 in the third set and ended up losing. In the second round of the French Open, she was upset by Mirjana Lučić-Baroni for the second time in the last three majors. She performed even worse at Wimbledon, being upset by No. 106 Jana Čepelová while struggling with a blister on her foot.

After Wimbledon, Halep took more than a month off before returning to tournament play for the North American hardcourt season. She rebounded from her results off the hard courts and finished runner-up at both Premier 5 events in August, the Canadian Open and the Cincinnati Open. Halep had won the second set of the final in Canada against Belinda Bencic, but ultimately needed to retire midway through the third set due to heat illness two and a half hours into the match. She recovered in time to play Cincinnati, but lost in the final to world No. 1 Serena Williams. Halep then produced her best Grand Slam result of the year, a semifinal at the US Open. She was upset at the event by the eventual champion, No. 26 Flavia Pennetta. At the end of the season, Halep qualified for the WTA Finals and became the top seed at the event after Williams withdrew. Although she defeated Pennetta in her opening match, she lost her last two round robin matches to No. 4 Maria Sharapova and No. 6 Agnieszka Radwańska and did not advance out of the group. Nonetheless, she finished the season with a career-best year-end ranking of No. 2 in the world.

=== 2016: Premier Mandatory title on clay ===
Halep underperformed at the Grand Slam events in 2016. She also had a slow start to the year, highlighted by an opening round loss at the Australian Open to qualifier Zhang Shuai who had not won a Grand Slam match in 14 attempts. She dealt with both an achilles injury and infections in the first two months of the season, and delayed nose surgery so she could play in the Fed Cup. In March, Halep lost in the quarterfinals at both Premier Mandatory events, the Indian Wells Open and the Miami Open. Having reached at least the semifinals at both events the previous year, she fell out of the top 5 in the rankings for the first time in over a year and a half. During the clay-court season, Halep won her second career Premier Mandatory title, defeating Dominika Cibulková in the final of the Madrid Open to return to the top 5. She did not continue this form into the French Open, losing to Samantha Stosur in the fourth round in a controversial match where play continued in rainy conditions. Halep fared better at Wimbledon, losing to eventual runner-up No. 4 Angelique Kerber in the quarterfinals.

Halep followed up Wimbledon with back-to-back titles at the Bucharest Open and the Canadian Open, her last two titles of the year. She also made her first career WTA doubles final at the Canadian Open, finishing runner-up to Ekaterina Makarova and Elena Vesnina alongside compatriot Monica Niculescu. In singles, Halep was able to defeat Kerber in Canada in the semifinals, and won in the final against No. 12, Madison Keys. However, she lost to Kerber in the semifinals at her next event, the Cincinnati Open. At the US Open, Halep made another Grand Slam quarterfinal, losing to world No. 1 Serena Williams in a tight three-set match. Her best result of the last stage of the year was a semifinal at the Wuhan Open, where she lost to eventual champion Petra Kvitová. For the second straight year, Halep ended the season by failing to advance out of her round robin group at the WTA Finals. After a win against No. 7 Keys and a loss to top seed Kerber, Halep only needed to win a set against No. 8 Cibulková to advance, but lost in straight sets. She finished the season ranked No. 4 in the world.

=== 2017: Second French Open final, world No. 1 ===
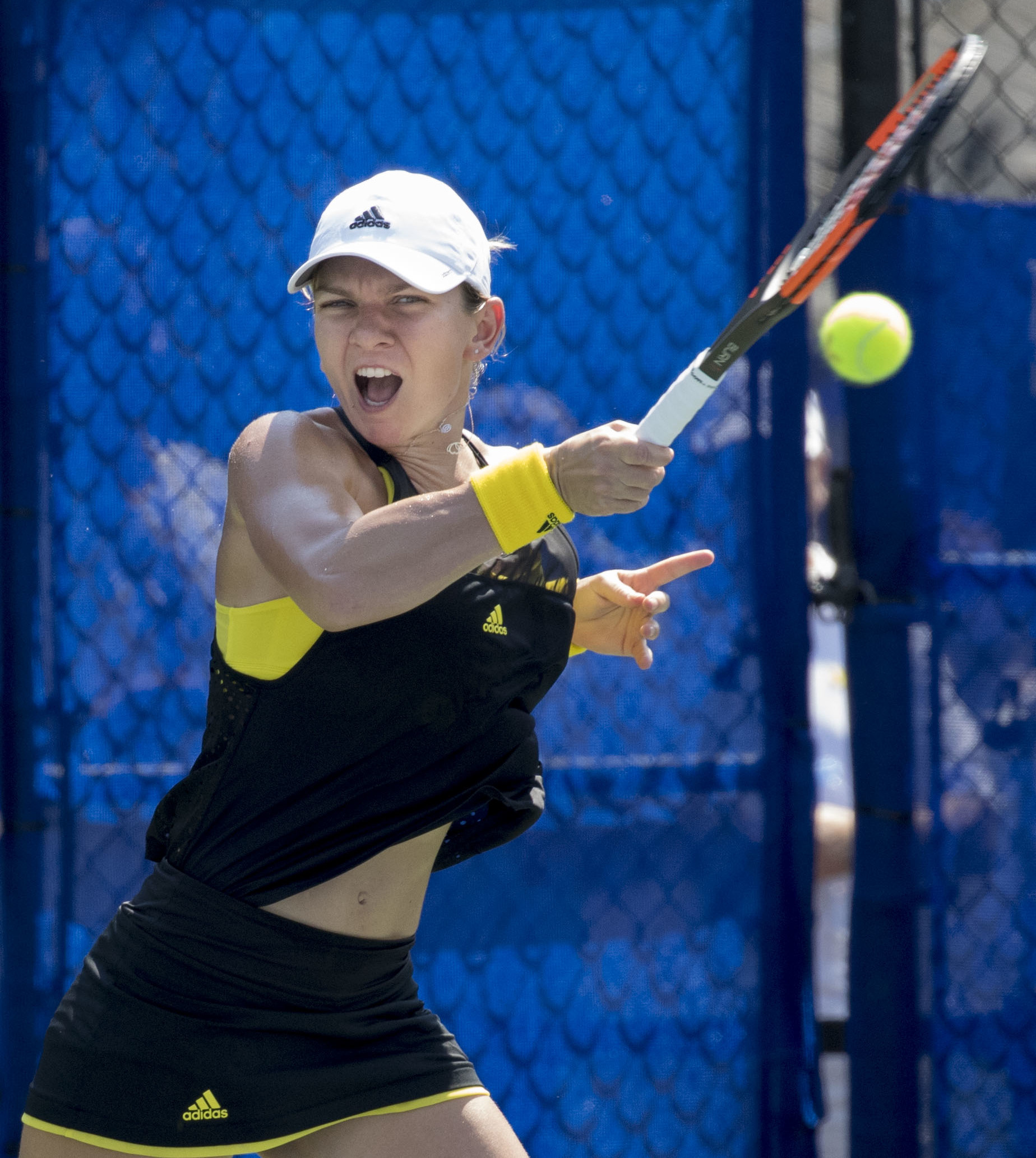
Halep at the 2017 Washington Open

For the second straight season, Halep had a slow start to the year. She once again lost in the opening round at the Australian Open to Shelby Rogers and did not win multiple matches at an event until the Miami Open in late March where she made the quarterfinals. During this time, she was having issues with her left knee. Halep rebounded during the clay court season, reaching at least the semifinals at all four events she entered. She defended her title at the Madrid Open to secure a Premier Mandatory title for the third consecutive year. She also made the final the following week at the Premier 5 Italian Open, but finished runner-up to No. 11 Elina Svitolina. At the French Open, she faced Svitolina again in the quarterfinals and fell behind a set and 5–1 before coming from behind to take the second set in a tiebreak and ultimately win the match. She also needed to save a match point in the second set tiebreak. Halep defeated world No. 3 Karolína Plíšková in the semifinals in three sets to make her second final at the French Open. Heavily favoured against unseeded Jeļena Ostapenko, Halep led the final by a set and a break before Ostapenko came from behind to win in three sets. With the runner-up, she moved back to No. 2 in the world. At Wimbledon, Halep lost in the quarterfinals to British No. 1, Johanna Konta, who had defeated her earlier in the year at Miami as well. With Serena Williams falling out of the top 10 following Wimbledon due to pregnancy, Halep became the longest-tenured member of the WTA top 10.

Halep continued to produce strong results in the second half of the season. She made it to the semifinals at the Canadian Open, losing again to Svitolina. She fared better at the Cincinnati Open, finishing runner-up to Garbiñe Muguruza. However, at the US Open, Halep was given a difficult draw in the first round against former champion Maria Sharapova, who was unseeded because she was returning from a doping suspension. Sharapova defeated Halep in three sets, ending her streak of reaching the quarterfinals at 10 consecutive events. Nonetheless, Halep rebounded and reached another Premier Mandatory final at the China Open. She defeated Sharapova during the event, but finished runner-up to No. 15 Caroline Garcia. Despite the loss, Halep became the world No. 1 for the first time, taking the ranking from Muguruza. She is the first Romanian woman to hold the No. 1 ranking, and the seventh to do so without having first won a Grand Slam tournament. At the 2017 WTA Finals, Halep could not advance out of her round robin group for the third consecutive year. After a win against No. 8 Garcia and a loss to No. 6 Wozniacki, Halep needed to defeat No. 4 Svitolina to advance, but lost in straight sets. She finished the season as the world No. 1.

=== 2018: French Open champion, Australian Open runner-up ===
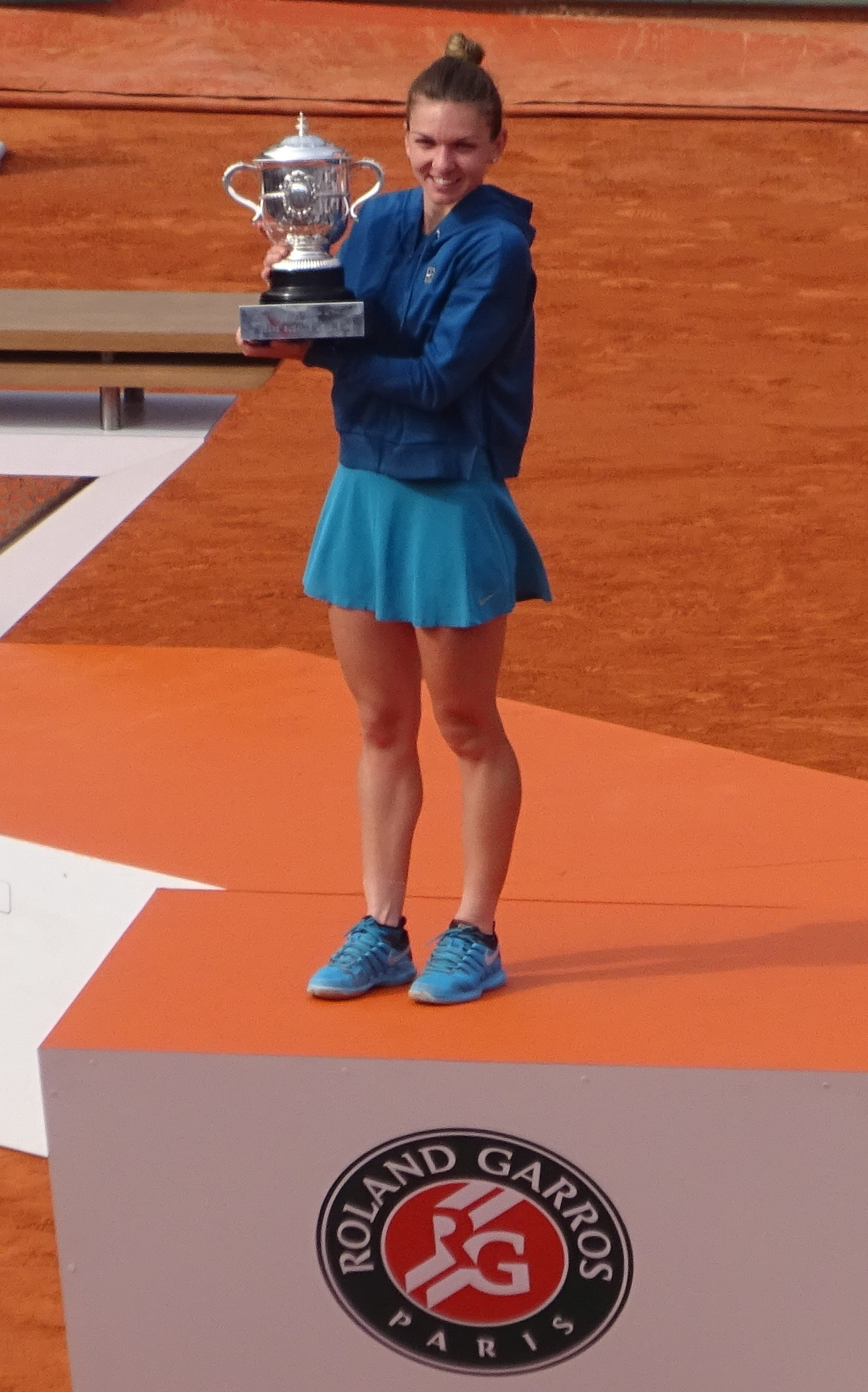
Halep with the French Open trophy

Halep kept the No. 1 ranking for nearly the entire year, only losing it for four weeks in February. She began the season by winning both the singles and doubles titles at the Shenzhen Open. This was her first WTA doubles title and came alongside compatriot Irina-Camelia Begu against the top-seeded team of Barbora Krejčíková and Kateřina Siniaková. She also defeated Siniaková in the singles final.

Having not won a match at the Australian Open in three years, Halep made it all the way to her third Grand Slam final. During the event, she played two of the ten best matches of the year according to Tennis.com. In the third round, Halep defeated Lauren Davis in a three-hour and forty-five minute match that ended 15–13 in the third set. She needed to save three match points on her serve at 11–12. Halep and Davis tied the Australian Open record for most games played in the women's singles main draw match with 48. It was also the third longest women's singles match in Australian Open history. The match was ranked as the third-best women's match of the year and seventh-best overall. In the semifinals, Halep defeated No. 16 Angelique Kerber in a two-hour and twenty minute match that ended 9–7 in the third set. After being broken while having a chance to serve the match at 5–3 in the final set, Halep had two break points for the match on Kerber's serve but could not convert. Kerber then broke Halep for a second consecutive service game and had two match points on her own serve, before Halep broke back to level the set at six games each. Halep would break Kerber two service games later on her second match point of the game. The match was ranked as the best women's match of the year and third best overall. Halep faced No. 2 Caroline Wozniacki in the final and lost in another tight three-set match, also losing the No. 1 ranking to Wozniacki. Halep reached two more hard court semifinals in the next two months at the Qatar Open and the Indian Wells Open. She regained the No. 1 ranking in late February.

Halep did not win any titles on clay in the lead-up to the French Open, with her best result being a runner-up finish at the Italian Open to Elina Svitolina in a rematch of the previous year's final. Karolina Plíšková ended Halep's 15-match win streak at the Madrid Open in the quarterfinals. At the French Open, Halep made her second Grand Slam final in a row and second consecutive French Open final, defeating No. 12 Angelique Kerber and No. 3 Garbiñe Muguruza in the quarterfinals and semifinals. She then came from a set and a break down against No. 10 Sloane Stephens to win her first career Grand Slam title. She became just the sixth player to win both the girls' singles title and the women's singles title at the French Open, as well as the fourth woman to win a Grand Slam singles title after three or more runner-ups. The only grass-court event Halep played was Wimbledon, where she was upset by world No. 48, Hsieh Su-wei, despite having a match point.

Halep continued her success on hardcourts, reaching the final at both the Canadian Open and the Cincinnati Open. She won the Canadian Open against Sloane Stephens in three sets in a rematch of the French Open final. The match was ranked as the second-best women's match of the year and the fifth-best overall. Together with her two Australian Open classics, Halep won the three best women's matches of the year according to Tennis.com. She nearly won back-to-back Premier 5 titles the following week, but finished runner-up to No. 17, Kiki Bertens, despite having a match point in the second-set tiebreak. However, Halep would end up losing her last three matches of the year, including her opening match at the US Open against No. 44 Kaia Kanepi. She ended her season in late September after dealing with an achilles injury and then a back injury.

=== 2019: Wimbledon champion ===
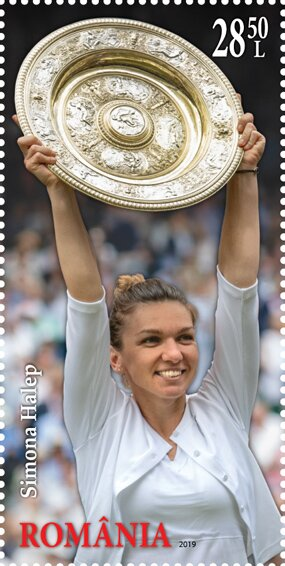
Halep with Wimbledon trophy, on a stamp

Halep recovered from her back injury in time for the start of the 2019 season. She lost her first match back at the Sydney International to the eventual runner-up, Ashleigh Barty. She received a difficult draw at the Australian Open and lost in the fourth round to Serena Williams, who had finished runner-up at the previous two Grand Slam events. With this result, she also lost the No. 1 ranking. Halep finished runner-up to Elise Mertens at her next event, the Qatar Open. She made another hardcourt semifinal at the Miami Open. Halep's best result on clay was another final at the Madrid Open, where she lost to Kiki Bertens. For the first time in three years, she did not reach the final at the French Open, losing in the quarterfinals to Amanda Anisimova. As a result, Halep fell to No. 8 in the rankings.

Halep played in one grass court tune-up, losing in the quarterfinals of the Eastbourne International to Angelique Kerber. At Wimbledon, Halep made it to the final as the seventh seed, only dropping one set in the second round against compatriot Mihaela Buzărnescu. She did not face a seeded opponent until she defeated No. 8 Elina Svitolina in the semifinals. Halep entered the final against Serena Williams as an underdog, having won just one match against her in ten meetings. Nonetheless, she won the championship easily in under an hour, losing just two games in each set, and committing only three unforced errors in the entire match, the fewest ever recorded in a major final. She became the first Romanian to win a Wimbledon singles title and rose back to world No. 4.

After Wimbledon, Halep only played the two Premier 5 tournaments in the lead-up to the US Open, retiring in the quarterfinals of the Canadian Open and losing in third round to eventual champion Madison Keys at the Cincinnati Open. Although she won her first-round match at the US Open for the first time in three years, she was upset in the following round by Taylor Townsend. Halep closed out her season at the WTA Finals, where she reunited with coach Darren Cahill. After opening with a victory over No. 4 Bianca Andreescu, she did not advance out of her round robin group after losing to No. 8 Svitolina and No. 2 Plíšková. She finished the season at No. 4 in the world.

=== 2020–21: Three WTA Tour titles, injury, out of top 10 ===
Halep started the 2020 WTA Tour at the new tournament in Adelaide, where she defeated Ajla Tomljanović, but lost in the quarterfinals to Aryna Sabalenka. At the Australian Open, Halep reached the semifinals, where she lost to Garbiñe Muguruza, after having defeated Jennifer Brady, Harriet Dart, Yulia Putintseva, Elise Mertens, and Anett Kontaveit.

Halep won her 20th, 21st, and 22nd WTA titles this year. The first of these came in Dubai, where she defeated Ons Jabeur, Aryna Sabalenka, and Jennifer Brady, before defeating Elena Rybakina in a tight third-set tiebreak in the final. The next was in August at the Prague Open, where she defeated Elise Mertens in the final. Another title followed in September, when she beat an injured Karolína Plíšková in the Italian Open final. The 2020 French Open positioned Halep as the heavy favorite. She got through her first three matches in straight sets, but lost to eventual champion Iga Świątek in the fourth round while winning only three games. As a result, she missed out on regaining the No. 1 ranking. The COVID-19 pandemic disrupted much of the season.

Halep started 2021 at Gippsland, where she was defeated in the quarterfinals by Ekaterina Alexandrova. She also reached the quarterfinals of the Australian Open, losing to Serena Williams. Halep won one match at the Miami Open against Caroline Garcia, but she then withdrew due to a right shoulder injury. In April, at the Porsche Tennis Grand Prix, she defeated Markéta Vondroušová and Ekaterina Alexandrova, but lost to Aryna Sabalenka in the semifinals. She lost to Elise Mertens in the third round of Madrid Open.

Halep retired from her opening Italian Open match against with Angelique Kerber, after tearing a muscle in her left calf. The injury sidelined her from the French Open and Wimbledon, where she was the defending champion from 2019. As a result of not defending her 2019 Wimbledon points, her ranking fell to No. 13, dropping her out of the top 10 for the first time since January 2014 and ending a streak of 373 straight weeks in the top 10, the 8th longest in WTA history.

Returning from the injury, Halep entered the Canadian Open but was upset by Danielle Collins in three sets. Her first match win since her calf injury came at the 2021 Western & Southern Open against Magda Linette in the first round. However, she withdrew from the next match due to an injury to her right adductor. Making her Grand Slam return, she defeated Camila Giorgi in straight sets in the first round of the US Open. She then defeated Kristína Kučová and Elena Rybakina to reach the round of 16 for the fourth time in her career, but Svitolina kept her from reaching the quarterfinals. Halep finished the 2021 season at No. 20; previously she had finished each year starting with 2014 in the top 5. This was the first season since 2012 where Halep did not win a WTA singles title.

=== 2022: Two more career titles, back to top 10 ===
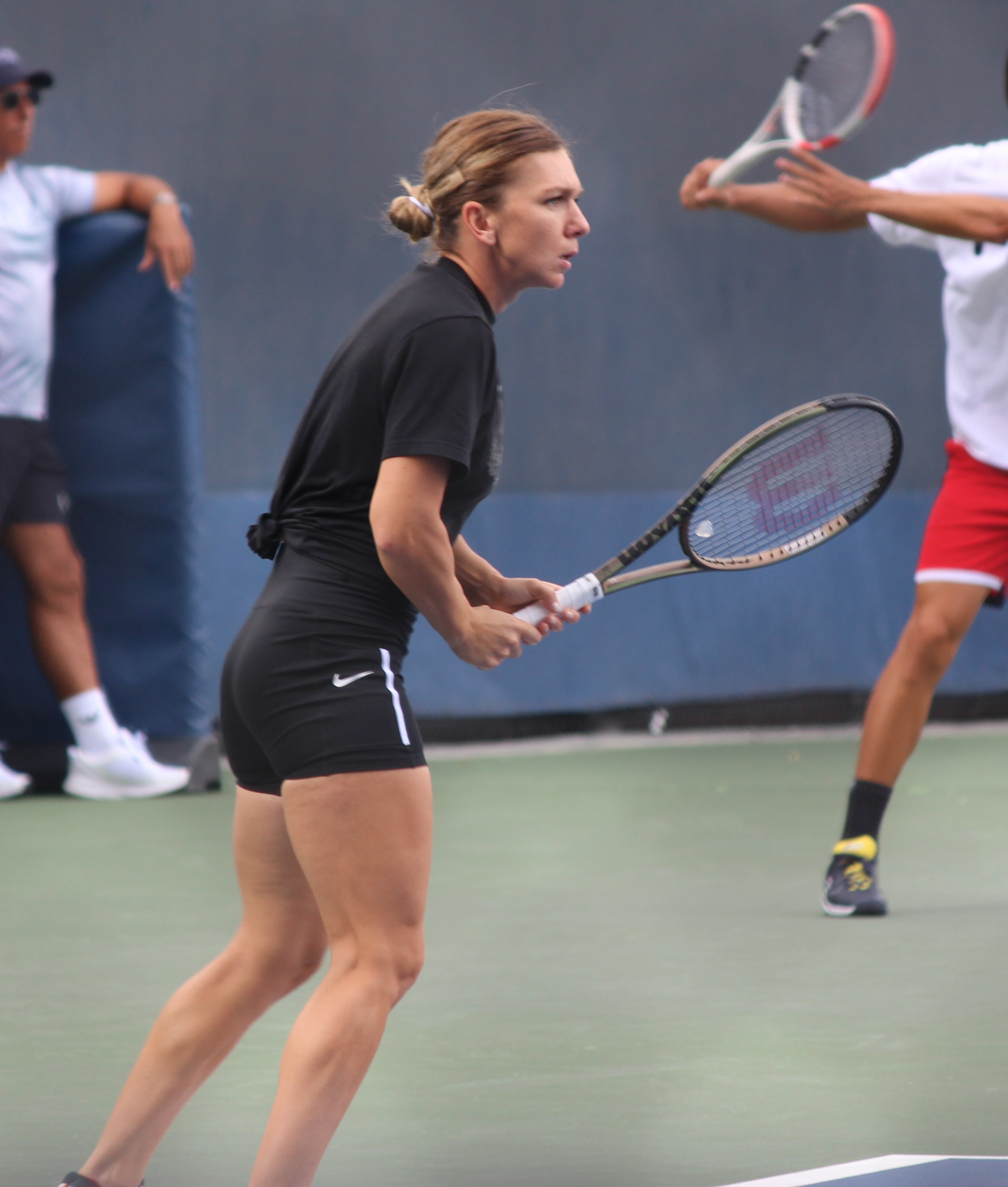
Halep at the 2022 US Open

The season started again in Australia. Halep won her 23rd title, and first in more than a year, at the 2022 Melbourne Summer Set 1, beating Veronika Kudermetova in the final in straight sets. At the Australian Open, she defeated Magdalena Fręch, Beatriz Haddad Maia and Danka Kovinić, all in straight sets, but lost in the fourth round in three sets to Alizé Cornet. In February, Halep reached the semifinals of the Dubai Open, falling to Jelena Ostapenko, and then Carolina Garcia beat her in the first round of the Qatar Open. In March, she lost in the semifinals of the Indian Wells Open to Iga Świątek. Halep then announced Patrick Mouratoglou as her full-time coach.

Halep's next event was the Madrid Open, where she lost in the quarterfinals to Ons Jabeur. In May at the Italian Open, she defeated Alizé Cornet in first round, but lost in the second round to Danielle Collins. At the French Open, Halep lost in the second round to teenager Zheng Qinwen. After winning the first set, Halep suffered a panic attack and could not focus on the match.

Halep reached further semifinals at Birmingham Classic, where she lost in three sets to Haddad Maia, and in June at the Bad Homburg Open, where she was forced to withdraw before the match due to a neck injury. At Wimbledon, Halep reached the semifinals without dropping a set, beating Karolína Muchová, Kirsten Flipkens, Magdalena Fręch, No. 4 Paula Badosa, and Amanda Anisimova, but lost to the eventual champion, Elena Rybakina, in the semifinals.

At the Canadian Open, she reached the semifinals defeating Coco Gauff in straight sets. She was through to her 29th career semifinal at a WTA 1000 event, the most of all time, ahead of Serena Williams (26), Agnieszka Radwańska (23), Victoria Azarenka (22) and Maria Sharapova (22) and is 29–9 all-time in quarterfinals at WTA 1000 events. She defeated Jessica Pegula to reach the final for the fourth time at this tournament and a first WTA 1000 final in two years. She became the player with the joint-most WTA 1000 18 finals to level with Serena Williams since 2009. She won her 24th title and third at the same tournament for the first time in her career defeating Beatriz Haddad Maia. As a result, she returned to the top 10 in the rankings at world No. 6 and is the leader with the most WTA 1000 level wins ever at 185 total.

At the Cincinnati Open, Halep withdrew from her second round match against Veronika Kudermetova due to thigh injury, after having defeated Anastasia Potapova in first round. At the 2022 US Open, Halep was stunned by qualifier Daria Snigur in the first round. After the US Open, she announced she would not play for the rest of the year after undergoing nose surgery.

=== 2023: Doping violation and suspension ===
In October 2022, it was announced that Halep had tested positive for the banned substance roxadustat at the 2022 US Open. It was later announced that abnormalities were found in Halep's biological passport, and these would be taken into account at the tribunal. On 12 September 2023, Halep's suspension was upheld, and it was announced that Halep would receive a four-year ban from tennis and be ineligible to return to competition until 7 October 2026. The International Tennis Integrity Authority (ITIA) published a 126-page detailed report on its investigation of the doping violations and the inconsistencies in her biological passport. Also, the ITIA has asked for disqualification of Halep's results from 8 March 2022, when blood Sample 44 was collected, to 7 October 2022, the start of Halep's Provisional Suspension. The Professional Tennis Players Association continued to defend Halep and called the handling of Halep's situation a "disgrace", while the director of the toxicology laboratory at the CHU de Garches (and judicial expert for the French Supreme Court) has said "we’re condemning an innocent woman. We’re making a mistake." Halep stated she would appeal the four-year ban.

=== 2024: Successful ban appeal and return to tennis ===
Halep appealed the four-year ban to the Court of Arbitration for Sport (CAS) on February 7, 2024. The decision was published on March 5. The Court agreed with Halep's contention that her positive test was likely caused by contamination of a supplement she had been using. Though the Court determined Halep did bear some level of fault or negligence for using the supplement, it did not rise to the level to justify a multi-year ban. Therefore, the Court's decision reduced the original four-year ban levied by the International Tennis Federation to nine months, which Halep had already served. Halep was cleared for immediate return from suspension.

On 7 March, Halep received a wildcard for the Miami Open. Despite taking the first set against Paula Badosa, she ended up losing in three sets in the first round.

Halep's next WTA Tour match was on 28 October at the Hong Kong Open, where she was given a wildcard entry but lost in the first round to Yuan Yue.

=== 2025: Retirement ===
Halep was awarded a wildcard for the Australian Open qualifying tournament. However, she withdrew after experiencing knee and shoulder pain during an exhibition event in Abu Dhabi.

After losing her first-round match at the Transylvania Open to Lucia Bronzetti, Halep announced her retirement from professional tennis.

== National representation ==
=== Fed Cup ===
==== 2010–14: five years in Europe/Africa Zone Group I ====
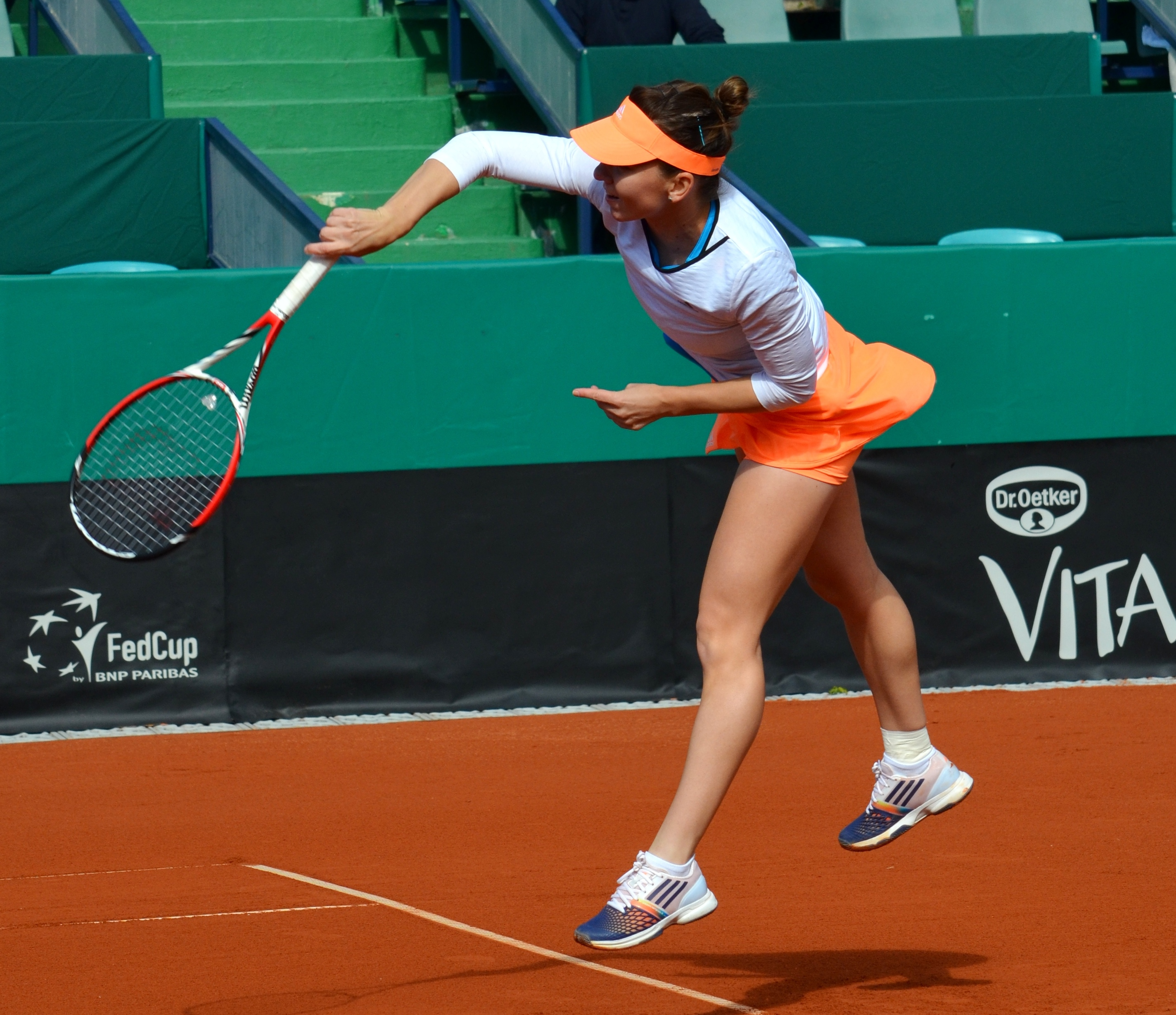
Halep representing Romania at the 2014 Fed Cup against Serbia

Halep made her debut for the Romania Fed Cup team in 2010 when they were in the third-tier Europe/Africa Zone Group I. They needed to win all three of the ties in their round robin pool to have a chance to get promoted to the next tier. From 2010 through 2012, they only won two out of three ties, and in 2013, they only won one tie. Halep played on the team in 2010, 2012, and 2014 when they were in this group. She won all three of her singles matches in 2010 and 2012, but lost a decisive doubles match in both ties Romania lost. Halep had partnered with Raluca Olaru in their loss against Switzerland in 2010, and Irina-Camelia Begu in their loss against Poland in 2012. In 2014, Romania swept their group of Hungary, Great Britain, and Latvia. They won in spite of Halep's first Fed Cup singles loss to Tímea Babos against Hungary. They then won a playoff against Ukraine, with Halep and Sorana Cîrstea winning the two singles rubbers, to advance to the World Group II play-offs. In the Play-offs, Romania defeated Serbia by a score of 4–1 to get promoted to World Group II in 2015. Halep and Cîrstea each played two singles rubbers, with Halep suffering the only loss against Ana Ivanovic.

==== 2015–18: promotions to World Group II and World Group ====
With the promotion, Romania faced Spain in the 2015 World Group II in a home tie. Halep and Begu both defeated Sílvia Soler Espinosa, while both losing to Garbiñe Muguruza. Begu and Monica Niculescu then won the decisive doubles rubber to win the tie for Romania. Although Halep decided to skip the World Group Play-off tie to rest and Begu also unavailable due to injury, Romania defeated Canada in an away tie by a score of 3–2 to advance to the top-tier World Group in 2016. Halep postponed having nose surgery to make her Fed Cup World Group debut in the first round against the defending champion Czech Republic team at home in Cluj. Halep lost the first match of the tie to Karolína Plíšková, despite taking the first set. Niculescu then defeated Petra Kvitová to level the tie. On the second day, Halep also defeated Kvitová. After Niculescu lost to Plíšková, the Czech team of Plíšková and Barbora Strýcová defeated Niculescu and Olaru in the decisive doubles rubber to win the tie. Romania's next tie came against Germany in the World Group play-offs. Germany won three of the four singles rubbers, with Halep losing her second singles match to Angelique Kerber, to relegate Romania back to World Group II for 2017.

Halep missed Romania's first Fed Cup tie in 2017 due to injury. Romania lost the tie to Belgium, sending them to the World Group II play-offs where they played a tie against Great Britain to avoid relegation. Halep was instrumental in Romania winning the tie 3–2 to keep them in World Group II for 2018. She won both of her singles matches against Heather Watson and Johanna Konta to give Romania 2–1 lead. Begu then clinched the tie with a win over Watson in the last singles rubber. Although Halep missed the 2018 World Group II tie due to injury, Romania won the tie against Canada to advance back to the World Group play-offs. Facing Switzerland, Romania took the first three singles rubbers, with Halep winning two and Begu winning the other, to secure the tie and get promoted back to the top-tier World Group for 2019.

==== 2019: World Group semifinal ====
Romania reached the semifinals of the World Group in 2019 for the first time since 1973, their best ever result. Like their last appearance in the World Group three years earlier, they were drawn against the defending champion Czech Republic team, who hosted the tie unlike in 2016. Halep and Mihaela Buzărnescu played the singles ties against Karolína Plíšková and Kateřina Siniaková. Halep won both of her rubbers, while Buzărnescu lost both of hers. In the decisive doubles rubber, Begu and Niculescu defeated Siniaková and Barbora Krejčíková to win the tie and put Romania in the semifinals. Romania faced France in the semifinals away from home. The tie began similarly to the first round, with Halep winning her two singles matches and Buzărnescu losing her first. Begu was chosen for the last singles rubber, but lost in three sets. Halep and Niculescu played the decisive doubles rubber against Caroline Garcia and Kristina Mladenovic. After winning the first set, the Romanians lost the match in three sets in nearly three hours to clinch the tie for France.

=== Olympics ===
Halep represented Romania at the 2012 Olympics in London. With a ranking of No. 50 in the world, she lost her opening round match to No. 47 Yaroslava Shvedova of Kazakhstan in straight sets. She skipped the 2016 Olympics in Rio de Janeiro due to concerns over the Zika virus. Halep was set to be the flag bearer for Romania at the 2020 Olympics in Tokyo, however she withdrew due to a calf injury she was recovering from.

== Playing style ==
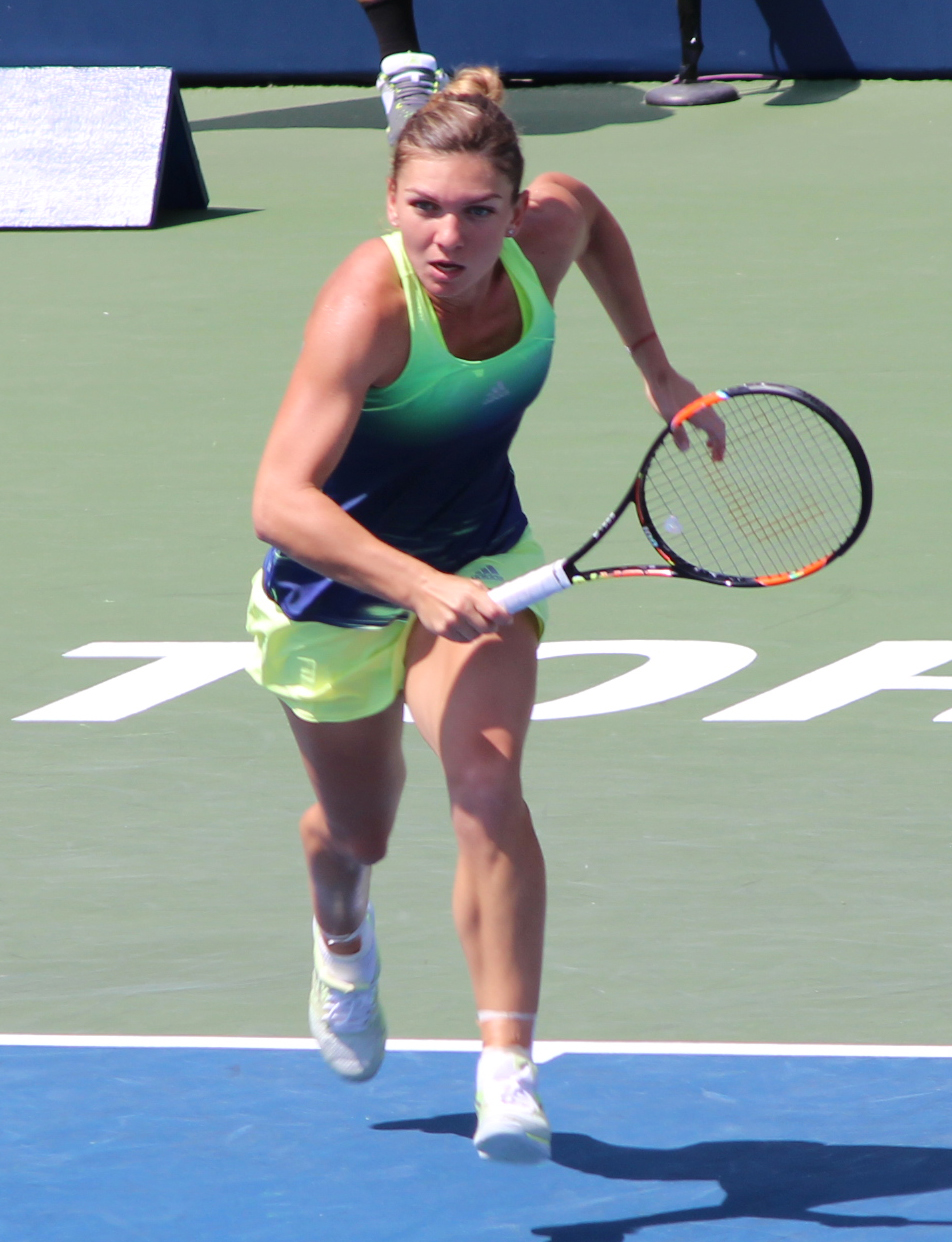
Halep covering the court

Halep has described herself as an aggressive baseliner. Her tennis idol and former world No. 1 Justine Henin has said, " [Halep] has an intelligent game. There is a little something that reminds me of myself... it is offensive and aggressive." Halep also had excellent defensive skills and great court coverage. Around the time of her breakthrough in 2013, she transitioned from being a grinder who primarily scrambled to get a lot of balls back in play to someone who played more aggressively. Journalist Louisa Thomas has compared her improved style of play to that of Novak Djokovic as someone who can hit strong but simple winners from defensive positions where opponents would expect a less aggressive shot. She could hit winners both cross-court and down-the-line. During points, Halep strived to disrupt her opponent's rhythm. She used her speed and anticipation to set up powerful shots rather than just extend points. Her fluidity and balance have been credited as the basis for this style of play that is both aggressive and defensive.

Halep's favourite surface was clay. She was described as "no one's idea of a grass-court player [before Wimbledon]" after winning the title there in 2019. Halep has had success on all surfaces, winning 10 hard court titles in 18 finals, 7 clay court titles in 16 finals, and both of her grass court finals. Although she preferred clay, Halep had a record of just 3–7 in finals at Premier 5, Premier Mandatory, and Grand Slam events on this surface. She fared better in high-level finals on hard courts, compiling a record of 5–7 across those three tournament tiers and the WTA Finals. She won a Grand Slam title on clay and grass courts but not hard courts, coming closest with her runner-up finish at the 2018 Australian Open.

Halep was one of the best returners on the WTA Tour. She finished the 2018 season ranked first in percentage of first serve return points won at 42.9%, fourth in percentage of second serve return points won at 60.8%, first in percentage of return games won at 48.5%, and ninth in percentage of break points won at 50.1% among all players with at least ten matches. She wasn’t ranked as highly in serving, in part due to her short stature at 1.68 m (5 ft 6 in). Nonetheless, she was ranked 21st in percentage of service points won in 2018 among players with at least ten matches.

== Coaching team ==
As a junior, Halep was coached by Ioan Stan in Constanța. She began working with Firicel Tomai in 2008. After five years, she switched coaches to Adrian Marcu, a former top 200 player. During this time, she also worked with Andrei Mlendea. Despite having a breakthrough year with six titles in 2013, Halep left Marcu at the end of the season. She hired Wim Fissette, a former coach of Kim Clijsters, at the start of 2014. Fissette was the first coach she worked with who was not Romanian. Under Fissette, Halep made her first Grand Slam final at the 2014 French Open. Nonetheless, she switched coaches at the end of the season to another Romanian coach, Victor Ioniță, who was also a former top 200 player. Veteran coach Thomas Högstedt also served as a consultant early in the year.

At the start of 2016, Halep began working with Darren Cahill, a former top 25 player from Australia. In three years with Cahill, Halep finished two seasons with the No. 1 ranking, reached three Grand Slam finals, and won her first major title at the 2018 French Open. Cahill left her team after the 2018 season to spend more time with his family. After beginning 2019 without a coach, Halep hired Romanian Daniel Dobre in March. Dobre had trained to be a coach under Günther Bosch, the former coach of Boris Becker. With Dobre as her coach, Halep won her second Grand Slam title at 2019 Wimbledon. Halep's longtime fitness coach is Teo Cercel, who she has worked with since she was a junior. In the autumn of 2019, she announced the return of Darren Cahill as coach, and the two started working together again at the WTA finals. In September 2021, she announced the end of their working relationship and rehired Adrian Marcu and Daniel Dobre back to her team. After a 4th round loss at the 2022 Australian Open and inconsistent results in the Middle Eastern swing, Halep hired Patrick Mouratoglou to her team in May 2022.

== Endorsements ==
Halep's clothing sponsor has been Nike since February 2018. She signed a $1.7 million deal a few weeks after competing at the 2018 Australian Open without a sponsor and finishing as the runner-up. Halep did not have a sponsor because her deal with Adidas, which began in May 2014, ended at the start of the year. She had also previously been sponsored by Lacoste. Halep endorses Wilson rackets, specifically the Steam 99 model, under the Blade 98 paint job.

Halep is sponsored by a variety of Romanian brands. She had a three-year deal with Vodafone Romania that began in November 2014. She appeared in commercials for Vodafone with her mother as part of their "Românii au iniţiativă" (Romanians have initiative) campaign. She also has appeared in Romanian commercials for Rexona, an international antiperspirant company. Halep endorses Dorna, a Romanian brand of water produced by Coca-Cola Romania, and has also participated in their "Grija pentru copii" (Care for children) campaign to provide care for babies born prematurely. Halep is also sponsored by Dedeman, the largest Romanian home improvement chain. She has been a brand ambassador for the Mercedes-Benz Romania automobile manufacturing company since 2017, and internationally for Hublot watches since 2016.

== Personal life ==
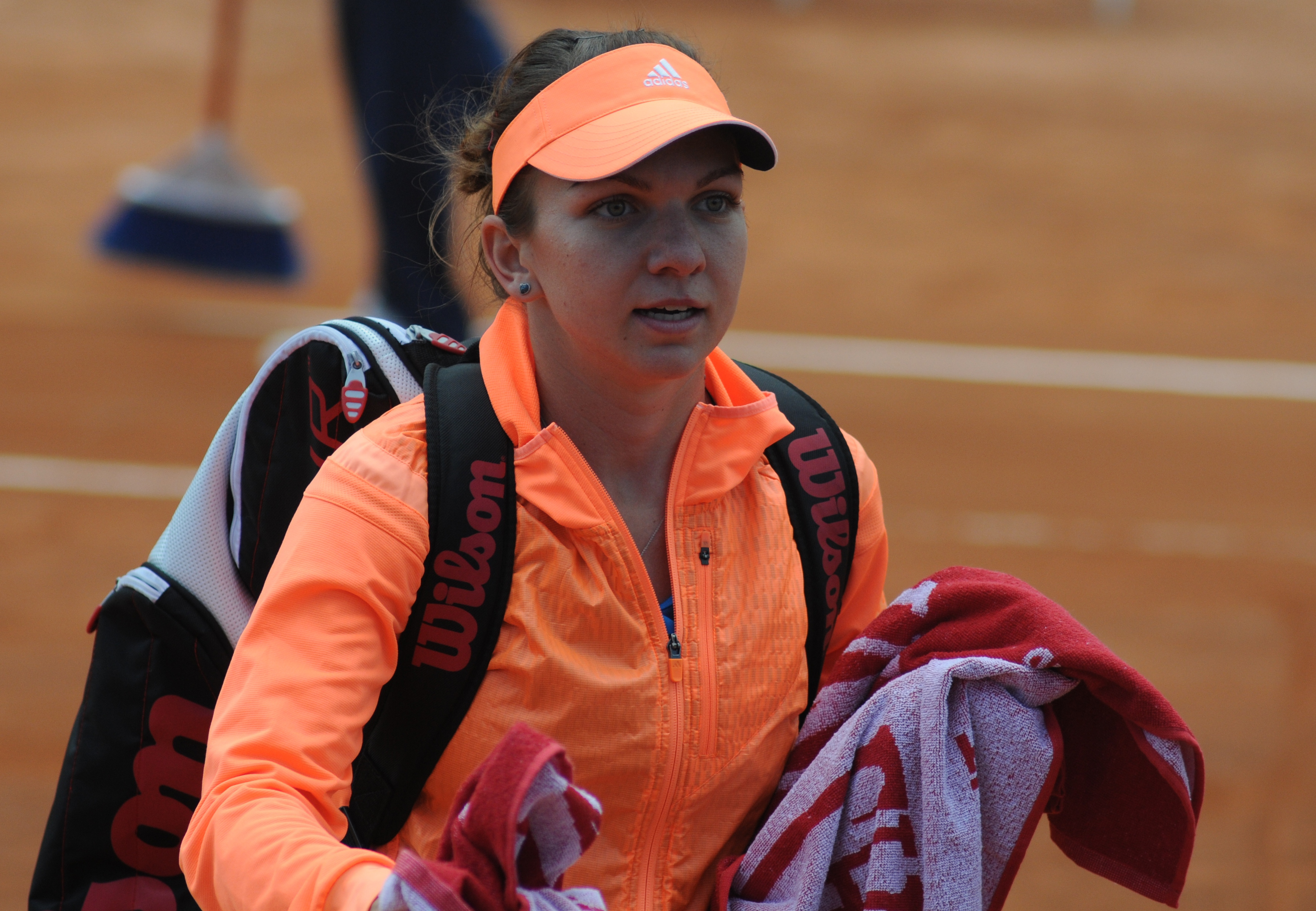
Halep in 2014

Romanian journalist Adrian Toca said, "Simona is without a doubt the biggest sports star in Romania". After Halep won Grand Slam titles at the 2018 French Open and 2019 Wimbledon, she was welcomed back to Romania with large celebrations at the Arena Națională in Bucharest. About 15,000 people attended the celebration after the 2018 French Open title and about 30,000 people attended after her 2019 Wimbledon triumph. Romanian International Tennis Hall of Fame and businessman Ion Țiriac presided over the Wimbledon celebration, which was attended by several of the most notable athletes in the country's history including footballer Gheorghe Hagi and Olympic gold medal gymnast Nadia Comăneci. Halep has also been named a cetățean de onoare, an honorary citizen of Bucharest. She has been awarded the Patriarchal Cross of Romania and the Order of the Star of Romania. Halep is also popular worldwide. She was named the WTA Most Popular Player of the Year in 2014 and 2015 for being the most-clicked player on the WTA website. She was also named the WTA Fan Favorite Singles Player for three consecutive years in 2017, 2018, and 2019.

Halep's tennis idols growing up were former world No. 1 Justine Henin and compatriot Andrei Pavel. She has said, "I liked [Henin's] style because she was playing very aggressively and she moved very well around the court. I've tried to take a few things from her and apply them to my game." Her main sporting idol was Gheorghe Hagi, who is regarded as the best footballer in Romanian history. Halep first met Hagi when she was nine years old and took a photo with him after he played a tennis match at the same facility where she was training. Halep is a big fan of football and is also an experienced player, saying, "I played a lot of football when I was a kid, on the street with my cousins and my brother". She supports the Romania national team, and admires both Lionel Messi and Cristiano Ronaldo.

Halep underwent breast reduction surgery at the age of 17 primarily to improve "her ability to react quickly" as a tennis player. While she has said "I would have gone for surgery even if I hadn't been a sportswoman", she has also called this surgery the biggest sacrifice she made to become a world No. 1 player. She also underwent nose surgery in September 2022 to correct breathing problems as well as to reshape her nose.

On 15 September 2021, she married businessman Gabriel Iuruc, but in September 2022 she announced that she is divorcing.

== Career statistics ==
=== Performance timelines ===
Key
W	F	SF	QF	#R	RR	Q#	DNQ	A	NH

(W) winner; (F) finalist; (SF) semifinalist; (QF) quarterfinalist; (#R) rounds 4, 3, 2, 1; (RR) round-robin stage; (Q#) qualification round; (DNQ) did not qualify; (A) absent; (NH) not held; (SR) strike rate (events won / competed); (W–L) win–loss record.
To avoid confusion and double counting, these charts are updated at the conclusion of a tournament or when the player's participation has ended.

==== Singles ====
Tournament	2009	2010	2011	2012	2013	2014	2015	2016	2017	2018	2019	2020	2021	2022	2023	2024	SR	W–L	Win %
Australian Open	A	Q1	3R	1R	1R	QF	QF	1R	1R	F	4R	SF	QF	4R	A	A	0 / 12	31–12	72%
French Open	Q2	1R	2R	1R	1R	F	2R	4R	F	W	QF	4R	A	2R	A	A	1 / 12	32–11	74%
Wimbledon	A	Q2	2R	1R	2R	SF	1R	QF	QF	3R	W	NH	A	SF	A	A	1 / 10	29–9	76%
US Open	A	1R	2R	2R	4R	3R	SF	QF	1R	1R	2R	A	4R	1R	A	A	0 / 12	20–12	63%
Win–loss	0–0	0–2	5–4	1–4	4–4	17–4	10–4	11–4	10–4	15–3	15–3	8–2	7–2	9–4	0–0	0–0	2 / 46	112–44	72%

==== Doubles ====
Tournament	2011	2012	2013	2014	2015	2016–20	2021	2022	SR	W–L	Win %
Australian Open	1R	1R	1R	1R	A	A	1R	1R	0 / 6	0–6	0%
French Open	1R	2R	1R	A	A	A	A	A	0 / 3	1–2	33%
Wimbledon	1R	1R	1R	A	1R	A	A	A	0 / 4	0–4	0%
US Open	2R	1R	1R	A	A	A	A	A	0 / 3	1–3	25%
Win–loss	1–4	1–3	0–4	0–1	0–1	0–0	0–1	0–1	0 / 16	2–15	12%

=== Grand Slam tournament finals ===
==== Singles: 5 (2 titles, 3 runner-ups) ====
Result	Year	Championship	Surface	Opponent	Score
Loss	2014	French Open	Clay	(Russia) Maria Sharapova	4–6, 7–6^{(7–5)}, 4–6
Loss	2017	French Open	Clay	(Latvia) Jeļena Ostapenko	6–4, 4–6, 3–6
Loss	2018	Australian Open	Hard	(Denmark) Caroline Wozniacki	6–7^{(2–7)}, 6–3, 4–6
Win	2018	French Open	Clay	(United States) Sloane Stephens	3–6, 6–4, 6–1
Win	2019	Wimbledon	Grass	(United States) Serena Williams	6–2, 6–2

=== WTA Championships finals ===
==== Singles: 1 (runner-up) ====
Result	Year	Tournament	Surface	Opponent	Score
Loss	2014	WTA Finals, Singapore	Hard (i)	(United States) Serena Williams	3–6, 0–6

== See also ==
- List of WTA number 1 ranked singles tennis players
- List of French Open women's singles champions
- List of Wimbledon ladies' singles champions
- List of Grand Slam women's singles champions
- List of Grand Slam girls' singles champions
- List of Romanians

== Notes ==
Sporting positions
Preceded by (Spain) Garbiñe Muguruza (Denmark) Caroline Wozniacki	World No. 1; 9 October 2017 – 28 January 2018; 26 February 2018 – 27 January 2019	Succeeded by (Denmark) Caroline Wozniacki (Japan) Naomi Osaka
Awards and achievements
Preceded by (Italy) Sara Errani	WTA Most Improved Player; 2013	Succeeded by (Canada) Eugenie Bouchard
Preceded by (Spain) Garbiñe Muguruza	WTA Player of The Year; 2018	Succeeded by (Australia) Ashleigh Barty
Preceded by (Spain) Garbiñe Muguruza	ITF World Champion; 2018	Succeeded by (Australia) Ashleigh Barty
