= Drăcșenei =

- Commune
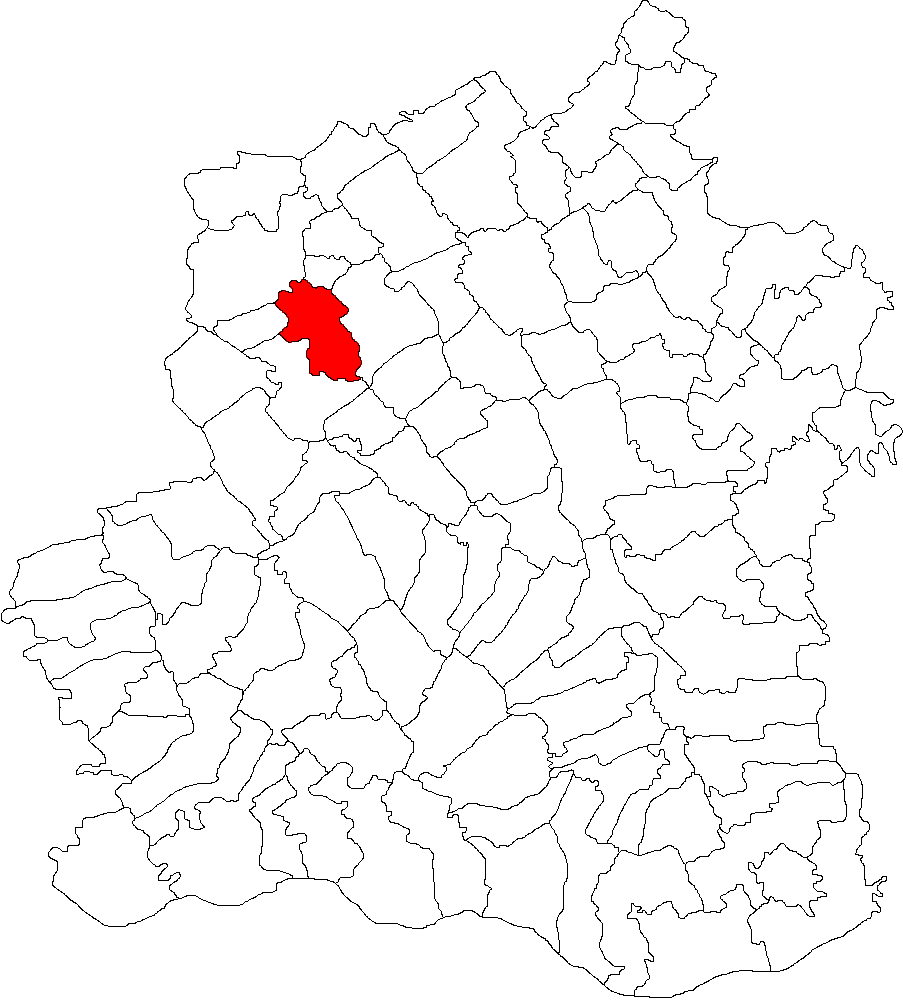
- Location in Teleorman County

- Location in Romania
- Coordinates: 44°13′N 24°59′E
- Country: Romania
- County: Teleorman
- Subdivisions: Drăcșani, Drăcșenei, Odobeasca, Satul Vechi

Government
  - Mayor (2020–2024): Marin Popescu (PSD)
- Area: 37.74 km^{2} (14.57 sq mi)
- Elevation: 111 m (364 ft)
- Population (2021-12-01): 1,460
  - Density: 39/km^{2} (100/sq mi)
- Time zone: EET/EEST (UTC+2/+3)
- Postal code: 147120
- Area code: +(40) 247
- Vehicle reg.: TR
- Website: comdracseneitr.ro

Drăcșenei (Romanian pronunciation: [drəkʃeˈnej]) is a commune in Teleorman County, Muntenia, Romania. It is composed of four villages: Drăcșani, Drăcșenei, Odobeasca, and Satul Vechi. It included two other villages until 2004, when they were split off to form Beuca Commune.
