= Beuca =

- Commune
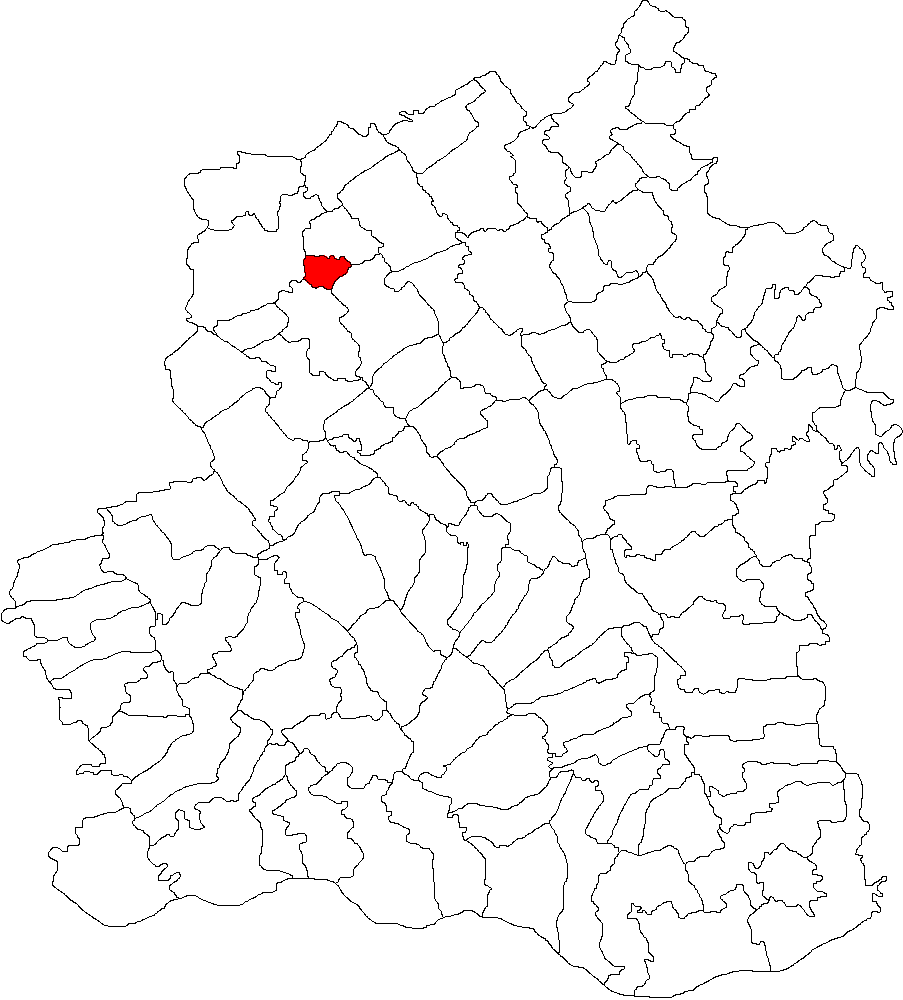
- Location in Teleorman County

- Location in Romania
- Coordinates: 44°15′N 24°58′E
- Country: Romania
- County: Teleorman
- Subdivisions: Beuca, Plopi

Government
  - Mayor (2024–2028): Eugen-Stan Bădăuță (PNL)
- Area: 24.9 km^{2} (9.6 sq mi)
- Elevation: 111 m (364 ft)
- Population (2021-12-01): 1,143
  - Density: 46/km^{2} (120/sq mi)
- Time zone: EET/EEST (UTC+2/+3)
- Postal code: 147121
- Area code: +(40) 247
- Vehicle reg.: TR

Beuca (Romanian pronunciation: [beˈuka]) is a commune in Teleorman County, Muntenia, Romania. It is composed of two villages, Beuca and Plopi. These were part of Drăcșenei Commune until 2004, when they were split off.

== Notable people ==
- Floarea Calotă (b. 1956) - Romanian singer and former member of the Chamber of Deputies
