= Floarea Calotă =

- Also known as: Floarea Calotă Lupu
- Born: March 27, 1956 (age 70); Beuca, Teleorman County, People's Republic of Romania
- Genres: popular music
- Occupations: singer, politician
- Instrument: voice

Member of the Chamber of Deputies of Romania
- In office 1990–1996

Personal details
- Party: Social Democracy Party of Romania (1993–1996)
- Other political affiliations: Democratic National Salvation Front (1992–1993); National Salvation Front (1990–1992)
- Education: Spiru Haret University

Floarea Calotă (born March 27, 1956, in Beuca, Teleorman County, Romanian People's Republic) is a Romanian singer of popular music and former politician. She served as a deputy in the Romanian Parliament during the 1990–1992, and 1992–1996 legislatures, representing Teleorman County. Initially elected on the lists of the National Salvation Front (FSN) under the name Floarea Calotă Lupu, she later represented the Democratic National Salvation Front (FDSN, Social Democracy Party of Romania - PDSR - since 1993). In 1978, she won the "Floarea din grădină" trophy. She was nicknamed the "flower of Teleorman County's music".

== Filmography ==
- Oglinda (1994)

== Discography ==
- 1978: Doina Plugului (EP)
- 1983: Tot Iubind Prin Teleorman
- 1985: Cucule De Pe Resteu
- 1987: Neiculiță, Floare Dulce
- 1989: Pe Deal La Teleormănel
- 1995: Așa Cu Drag Mi-a Căzut

Throughout her career, Floarea Calotă has been recognized for her contributions to Romanian folk music and has been listed among notable Romanian singers of popular music.
