= Galia Sabar =

Israeli professor of African studies

- גליה צבר
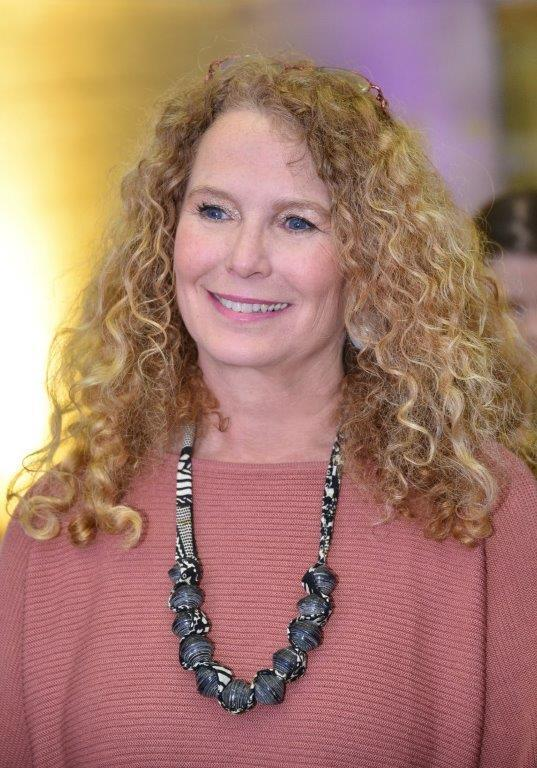
- Born: 1963 (age 62–63); Israel
- Occupation: President
- Organization: The Academic College of Tel Aviv Yaffo

Galia Sabar (Hebrew: גליה צבר; born 1963, Israel) is the president of the Academic College of Tel Aviv-Aviv Yaffo in Jaffa. She is a researcher at the Department of Middle Eastern and African History at Tel Aviv University. She was the president of Ruppin Academic Center between September 2016 and October 2021. Prior, she was a professor of African Studies at Tel Aviv University and the chair of African studies at the Department of Middle Eastern and African History at Tel Aviv University, where she also served as the coordinator of African studies at the S. Daniel Abraham Center for International and Regional Studies. Sabar has published seven books and dozens of articles in professional journals. In addition to her academic research, Sabar has been a leading social activist in Israel mainly in relation to Ethiopian immigrants as well as in partnership with various NGOs assisting African labor migrants and asylum seekers. In May 2009, in recognition of her work combining academic rigor with social activism, Sabar received the Unsung Heroes of Compassion Award, sponsored by the international organization Wisdom in Action and delivered by the 14th Dalai Lama.

== Academic background ==
Sabar earned a bachelor's degree with distinction in Middle Eastern history and African history at Tel Aviv University in 1985. In 1982, while still an undergraduate, she traveled to Ethiopia to guide a group of American Jews who supported the clandestine Operation Moses (at the time not yet given that name). Between 1982 and 1984, she visited Ethiopia over 20 times, providing funds and information for Ethiopian Jews prior to their journey to Sudan. These two years in Ethiopia had a profound impact on her life, and since then she has continued to visit the continent, with the aim of conducting research as well as for purposes of social and public engagement. In 1987 she received a master's degree in African Studies from the Hebrew University in Jerusalem, which she completed summa cum laude. Her graduate dissertation, supervised by Professor Mordechai Abir, examined Ethiopia's post-revolution consolidation of national identity.

In 1989, Sabar moved with her family to Kenya, where she stayed for three years gathering data for her doctorate. Though the research commenced with the disciplines of history and political science in mind, it eventually shifted to anthropology. In 1993, Sabar received her doctorate in African Studies from Hebrew University. Her research focused on the complex relations between church, state, and society in Kenya, and was supervised by Professor Naomi Chazan and Professor Steven Kaplan. In 1994, she began lecturing at the Department of Middle Eastern and African History at Tel Aviv University. In 1996, she returned to Kenya, where she led an international research group that examined socio-political aspects of the AIDS epidemic in collaboration with Professor Sobbie Mulindi of Kenyatta National Hospital. Since 1998 Sabar has focused her research on African labor migrants and asylum seekers in Israel.

In May 2009, Sabar received the Unsung Heroes of Compassion Award, sponsored by the international organization Wisdom in Action and delivered by the Dalai Lama. The prize is awarded once in several years, and so far it has been given to 150 people worldwide. Sabar was awarded in appreciation of her long and dedicated involvement in both research and social activism in issues pertaining to Ethiopian Jewry as well as to African labor migrants in Israel, and for bringing these issues to the Israeli public eye. Sabar, together with Ms. Ibtisam Mahamid are the first Israelis to be awarded this prize. Sabar received the prize in a ceremony held in San Francisco in May 2009, along with 49 other activists worldwide.

== The Academic College of Tel Aviv-Yaffo ==
Since October 2024 Sabar is the president of the Academic College of Tel-Aviv Yaffo. It is an Israeli public, land-grant, academic college which is located on the seamline between Jaffa and south Tel Aviv. The college fosters academic excellence alongside social mobility and employability across the diverse Israeli society. It offers Bachelor and master's degree programs in six disciplinary schools - the School of Computer Science, the School of Behavioral Science, the School of Information Systems, the School of Nursing Science, the School of Government and Society and the School of economics and Management.

== Personal life ==
Together with her partner, Ofer Shechter, Sabar is raising five children: Matan, Noam, Yuval, Or and Bar.

== Social involvement ==
Sabar is a volunteer board member in four organizations: the Jerusalem AIDS Project (JAIP), IRAC - the Israel Religious Action Center of the Jewish Reform movement, the Hotline for Migrant Workers and NALA, an Israeli-based foundation providing consultation about and implementation of programs for infectious disease control in Africa. Since 2011, Sabar has co-organized, together with Dr. Shiri Tenenbaum, several different courses and workshops aimed at the promotion of health and human rights for African refugees and asylum seekers in Israel. Two of the courses addressed Israeli health workers and two addressed migrants and refugees themselves. All courses were held in collaboration with the "Social Clinic" at Sheba Hospital.

== Research ==
=== Christianity in Africa ===
From 1987 to 1997, Sabar focused her research on relations between church, state, and society in Kenya. She spent four years in Nairobi, Kenya. Her research was based on thousands of local church documents and official British and Kenyan documents as well as extensive fieldwork conducted throughout the country, which included hundreds of interviews with church members and leaders, and long hours of participant observation in various religious activities.

In 2002 she published in England her book, "Church, State and Society in Kenya: From Mediation to Opposition, 1963-1993". The book traces the complex relations between religion, society and state in Kenya in the years 1963–1993. It emphasizes the centrality of religion in our contemporary modern world. It shows how Kenyan churches helped to shape the social, religious and political arenas in the country. Sabar claims that the churches created alternative politics and a new language with which to discuss human rights issues and the struggle for democracy. Concurrently, the book exposes the churches' widespread corruption and nepotism.

=== The AIDS epidemic in Africa ===
Between 1995 and 1999, Sabar led an international team of experts which examined the spread of AIDS in Africa through examining the epidemic's socio-political aspects. An emphasis was put on tracing cultural components which make AIDS especially prevalent in some areas. Sabar, together with Prof. Mulindi of Kenyatta National Hospital and Prof. Allie Dubb from Israel, examined the processes which led churches to take key roles in the struggle against AIDS.

During her stay in Kenya in 1996–1997, Sabar broadened the scope of her research on churches to include their contributions to the effort to prevent the further spread of AIDS. She was one of the organizers of the 9th international conference on AIDS prevention, which was attended by renowned scholars on AIDS, including Professor Robert Gallo and Professor Jonathan Mann. From 1997 to 2002, she led an international team of experts which studied the economic, social, ethnic and religious elements which affect Kenyan teenagers in their engagement in sexual relations. AIDS Education Prevention in Multi-Cultural Societies

This book is a collection of essays edited by Sabar together with Inon Schenker and Francisco Sy. Published in 1996, the book brought together articles from various disciplines (e.g., women and AIDS, religion and AIDS, art and AIDS) and from various places, all of which dealt with AIDS prevention. This was the first book in the corpus of AIDS prevention research to tackle the disease from such a wide perspective. While today such an interdisciplinary approach is widely accepted, at the time of the book's publication, it was rather revolutionary.

=== Modern Kenyan History: From a White Man’s Colony to an Independent Country ===
Sabar, with Professor Mordechai Tamarkin, co-authored this book, which was published in 1997 by the Open University of Israel. It was the first Hebrew-language book to analyze the modern political history of Kenya from the early 1900s to 1992. The book's uniqueness is its attempt to link classical historical writing with writing from other perspectives, including that of gender, workers' unions and religious congregations. The book's main innovation is in its emphasis on the centrality of Christianity in shaping the Kenyan political arena.

=== African labor migrants ===
Starting in 1998, Sabar embarked on a large-scale research project on African labor migrants in Israel. During eight years of extensive field research, she actively participated in their various social activities: churches, sports associations and educational initiatives, attempting to gain insights into their lives, modes of thought and worldviews. In her research, Sabar points at the labor migrants' double identity, as endorsed by the churches: on the one hand, a Christian-religious identity adjusted to life in Israel, and on the other hand, a trans-national modern identity, in line with the globalization process. The findings from her research were published in academic journals.

"We're Not Here to Stay: African Migrant Workers in Israel and Back in Africa". Tel Aviv University Press, 2008. Following massive deportation of non-documented African labor migrants from Israel, Sabar followed the migrants back to their home countries. In 2008, she published We’re Not Here to Stay, a book that traces and analyzes the full circle of migration: leaving home, establishing life in Israel and returning home. The book analyzes the social, religious and political structures labor migrants established in Israel and their life histories once returning home. In a paper entitled " African-Israel-Africa. Return migration experiences of African Labor migrants", Sabar highlights the significance of the non-material assets returning migrants brought back with them as a key factor in determining the nature of their return experience.

Since 2007 Sabar has focused her research on African asylum seekers, mainly from Sudan and Eritrea, who have entered Israel through its penetrable Egyptian border. Sabar has focused her research on the asylum seekers’ social and cultural lives. In a comparative article entitled "Israel and the ‘Holy Land’: The Religio-Political Discourse of Rights among African Migrant Labourers and African Asylum Seekers, 1990–2008," she explores the religious arena of African Christians in Israel. In a joint research project with Rachel Posner, she highlights the cultural life of African asylum seekers with special emphasis on local restaurants as culinary safe havens.

== Selected publications ==
- Sabar Galia (2013) "Between Israel and the Holy Land: The Role of AIC's within African Transnational Migration to Israel," Journal of Levantine Studies, Vol. 3(1).
- Sabar Galia (2013) "Africa-Israel-Africa; Return Migration Experience of African Labour Migrants," Migration Letters, Vol. 10(1): 57–70.
- G. Sabar, We're Not Here to Stay: African migrant Workers in Israel and Back in Africa， Tel Aviv: Tel Aviv University Press, 2008. (in Hebrew).
- G. Sabar (2006) Une migration inachevée ? Réflexions sur la communauté africaine de travailleurs migrants en Israël, à la veille de sa disparition. The Cahiers des Anneaux de la Mémoire N° 9
- G. Sabar and S. Kanari, (2006)“’ I’m Singing my way up’ – The significance of Music amongst African Christian migrants in Israel,” in Studies in World Christianity: the Edinburgh Review of Theology and Religion, Volume 12, Issue 2, pp. 101-125.
- G. Sabar(2005), "African Christianity in the Jewish State: Adaptation, Accommodation and Legitimization of Migrant Workers’ Churches 1990-2003", in Journal of Religion in Africa : 407 – 437.
- G. Sabar (2007) "The Rise and Fall of African Migrant Churches: Transformation in African Religious Discourses and Practices in Tel Aviv," in Sarah S. Willen ed. Transnational Migration to Israel in Global Comparative Context, London: Lexinon Books.G. Sabar, Church, State and Society in Kenya – From Mediation to Opposition, 1963–1993, London: Frank Cass, 2002.
- M. Tamarkin and G. Sabar-Friedman, Modern Kenyan History; From a White Man’s Colony to an Independent Country, Tel Aviv: Open University Press, 1997. (in Hebrew).
- G. Sabar-Friedman (1997), “Church and State in Kenya, 1986-1992: The Churches’ Involvement in the ‘Game of Change’," African Affairs, Vol. 96: pp. 25–52.
- I. Schenker, G. Sabar-Friedman and I. Francisco (eds.), AIDS Education Prevention in Multi-Cultural Societies, New York: Plenum Press, 1996.
