= Shaul Arieli =

Israeli military officer and peace activist

- שאול אריאלי
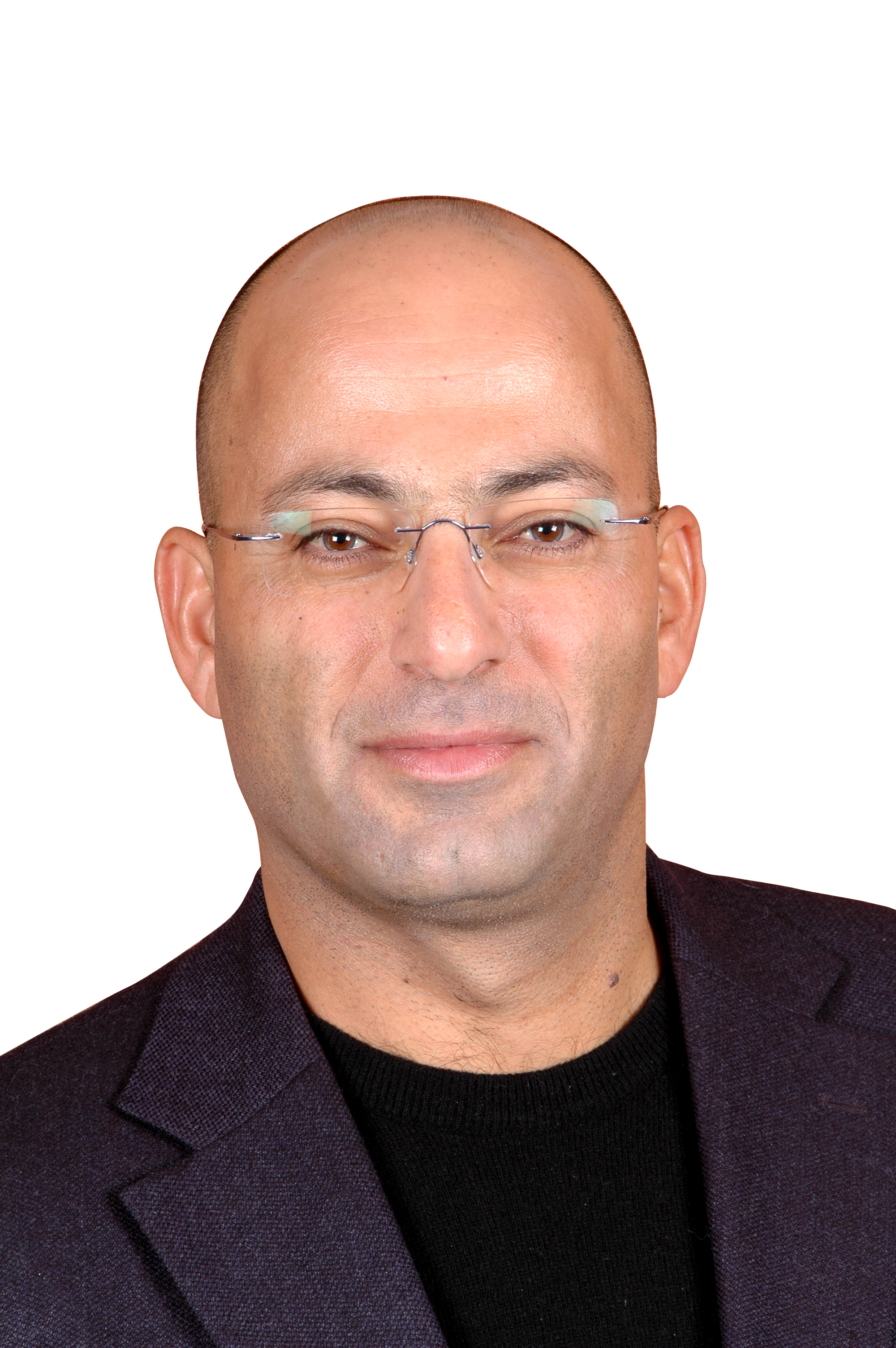
- Shaul Arieli
- Born: 1959; Ashkelon
- Education: Tel Aviv University, University of Haifa
- Occupation: Officer
- Employers: Academic College of Tel Aviv-Yafo; Israel Defense Forces
- Notable work: Geneva Initiative
- Website: www.shaularieli.com

Shaul Arieli (Hebrew: שאול אריאלי; born in 1959) is an Israeli retired military officer and expert on the Israeli–Palestinian conflict.

== Early life and military service ==
Arieli was born in Ashkelon in 1959, the seventh and youngest son of parents who were Jewish immigrants from Iran. Arieli played in different teams in the handball Premier League.

In 1978, Arieli enlisted in the IDF, volunteered for the paratroopers, and was accepted into the brigade's "Orev" company, where he underwent a training course as a combat soldier, a course for infantry commanders and a course for infantry officers. At the end of the course he returned to the company as a platoon commander. He continued to serve in the brigade's commanding positions. He was a company commander during the First Lebanon War, during which he was also wounded, and subsequently served in the South Lebanon security zone and First Intifada. He rose through the ranks, serving as commander of the paratroopers' "Orev" company, commander of a battalion at the paratroopers regiment's commander's course, commander of the paratroop brigade training base and deputy brigade commander. Arieli took part in a course for brigade commanders as commander of the northern brigade in Gaza, with the rank of colonel.

Arieli served as Deputy Military Secretary to the Prime Minister and Minister of Defense (1997–1999, during the twenty-seventh government of Israel under Benjamin Netanyahu), and headed the Administration for the Interim Agreement in the West Bank and as Head of the Administration for the Permanent Status Agreement. In 2001, he retired from the IDF.

== Political career (2001-) ==
Since his retirement from the IDF, Arieli has been active in several left-wing organizations working to advance a permanent status agreement with the Palestinians. He is one of the heads of the Geneva Initiative and a member of the board of the Council for Peace and Security (on its behalf, he appeared before the High Court of Justice under the status of a "friend of the court" in the main petitions that were filed regarding the separation barrier and greatly affected its route) and a senior researcher at the Economic Cooperation Foundation NGO. In the 2006 elections for the 17th Knesset he was placed in 12th position on the Meretz list but was not elected.

Arieli conducts numerous media appearances, lectures and field tours on the main issues of the conflict to people from various sectors of Israeli society, including public figures, academia, security and the media. Arieli published a series of articles and books in Hebrew and English, concerning the conflict and the political process, as well as articles of opinion in the press. His book "A Border between Us and You" won the Tshetshik Prize for Israel Security Studies in 2013. His book, "All of Israel's Borders" was published in 2018.

== Studies and research ==
Arieli graduated with a BA in Political Science and an MA in Management Sciences, both from Tel Aviv University. He completed his doctorate at the Department of Geography and Environmental Sciences at Haifa University, and his research was devoted to examining the development of Israel's borders in comparison to other conflicts zones in the world. Arieli is a lecturer at the Interdisciplinary Center Herzliya, the Hebrew University and the Academic College of Jaffa.

== Personal life ==
Arieli lives in Tel Aviv and is married. He is a father of three and grandfather of one.

== Publications ==
- From Theory to Practice, Implementation of Quality Management in Military Units, IDF, 1994
- Dreams of Stone, 1993
- The Territorial Aspect of the Israeli-Palestinian Negotiations on a Permanent Status Agreement, Ron Pundak, Shaul Arieli, Peres Center for Peace, 2004
- "Tafasta merube lo tafasta" Approaches in the struggle for the borders of the State of Israel," Carmel Publishing House, Jerusalem, 2006
- Solo's Journey, Saar Publishing House, 2006
- Misdemeanor and Folly, on the Proposals to Transfer Arab Communities from Israel to Palestine, Shaul Arieli, Dubi Schwartz, Hadas Tagari, Floersheimer Institute, 2006
- Wall and Folly, The Separation Fence - Security or Greed, Shaul Arieli and Michael Sfard, Aliyat Hagag and Yedioth Books Publishing Houses, 2008
- The Right to Think, Collection of Articles on the Israeli - Palestinian Conflict, 2010
- People & Borders, About the Israeli Palestinian conflict, shaul arieli, 2010
- A border between us and you - the Israeli-Palestinian conflict and the ways to settle it, Shaul Arieli, Aliyat Hagag and Yedioth Books Publishing Houses, 2013
- The Right to Think, Collection of Articles on the Israeli - Palestinian Conflict, 2015
- People & Borders, About the Israeli Palestinian conflict, shaul arieli, 2015
- Messianism Meets Reality, the Israeli Settlement Project in the West Bank, 1967–2016, Economic Cooperation Foundation, 2017
- The Right to Think, Collection of Articles on the Israeli - Palestinian Conflict, 2018
- Peoples & Borders, 2018
- All of Israel's Borders, Shaul Arieli, Aliyat Hagag and Yedioth Books Publishing Houses, 2018
