= Michael Karayanni =

Israeli legal scholar

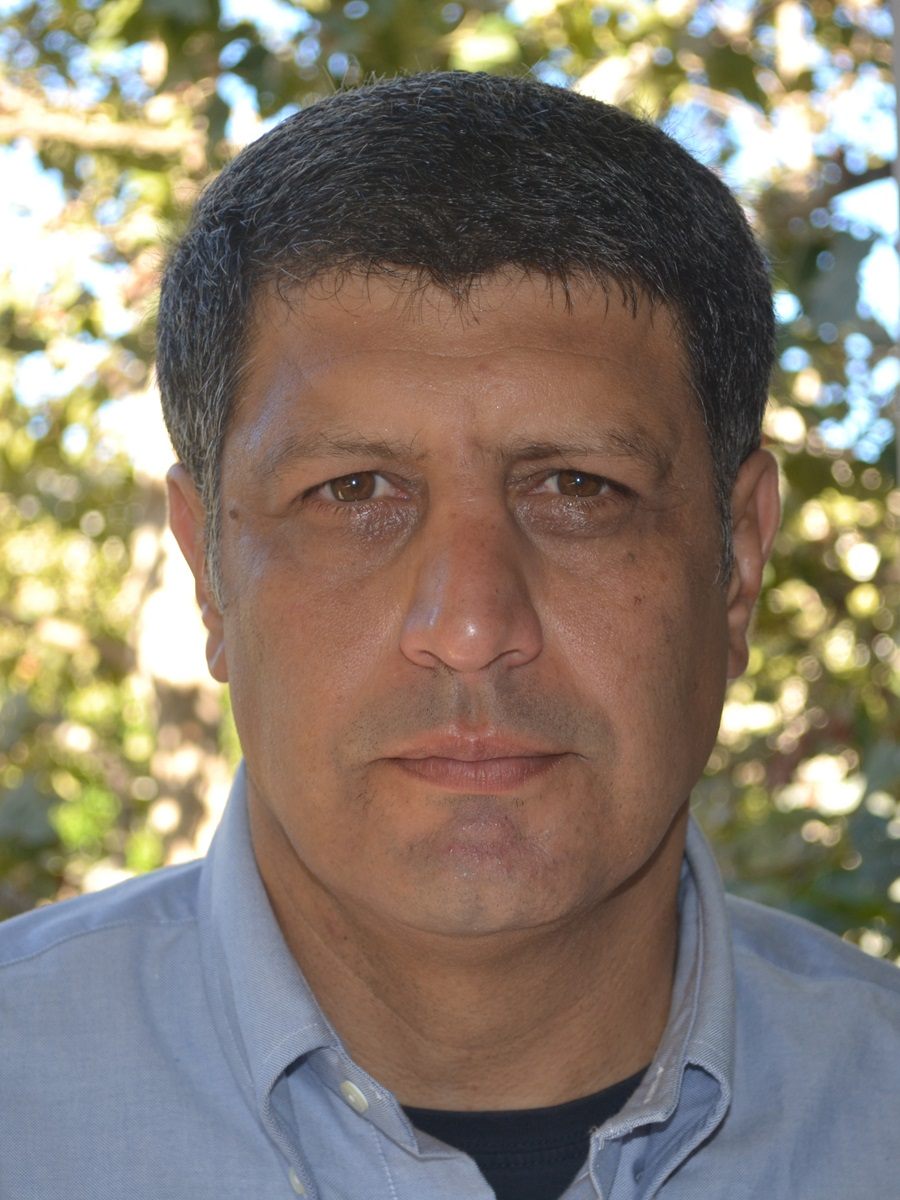
Michael Mousa Karayanni

Michael (Mousa) Karayanni (Arabic: مخائيل موسى كريني, Hebrew: מיכאיל קרייני; born 1964) is an Arab-Israeli professor of law at the Hebrew University of Jerusalem and holds the Bruce W. Wayne Chair in International Law.

== Biography ==
He was educated at Bar-Ilan University (LL.B 1990); George Washington University National Law Center (LL.M 1994); Hebrew University of Jerusalem (LL.D, summa cum laude, 2000), University of Pennsylvania (S.J.D., 2003). His doctoral supervisors were Celia Wasserstein Fassberg (at Hebrew University) and Geoffrey C. Hazard Jr. (at Penn).

Karayanni was the Academic Director of the Minerva Center for Human Rights (2004-2006); Vice-Dean of the Faculty of Law (2006-2008) and the Director of the Harry and Michael Sacher Institute for Legislative Research and Comparative Law (2008 – 2012).

Among his prizes and awards: The Israeli Arab Scholarship Program, awarded by the United States Embassy in Tel-Aviv for Graduate Studies in the United States (1992-1994); Allan Bronfman Prize for Outstanding Doctoral Dissertation in the Humanities and Law (2000); Fulbright Fellowship (2002-2003); Rothschild Fellowship (2002-2003); Ma’of Fellowship (2003-2006); Israel Science Foundation Grant (2005-2009) (with Celia Fassberg); Rector's Prize (2011); Israel Science Foundation Grant (2012 – 2014).

Karayanni held visiting positions at National University of Singapore (Visiting Professor of Law (2024); University of Pennsylvania Carey School of Law (Bok Visiting Professor of Law (2024); University of Chicago School of Law (Daniel R. Fischel & Sylvia M. Neil Distinguished Visiting Professor of Law, University of Chicago Law School (2022); Member, Wissenschaftskolleg zu Berlin (Institute for Advanced Study, Berlin) (2019-2020); Georgetown University Law Center (Visiting Professor of Law, 2021; 2015); ( University of Melbourne Law School (Senior Fellow, The Melbourne Law Masters, 2013); Stanford Law School (Visiting Professor of law, 2012-2013); Stanford University (Visiting Associate Professor, Ford Dorsey Program in International Policy Studies, Stanford University, 2012-2013); Yale Law School (Senior-Fellow, Orville H. Schell Jr. Center for International Human Rights, 2008 Institute for Advanced Study, Princeton (Member, 2007-2008); The Max Planck Institute for Foreign Private and Private International Law, Hamburg (visiting Scholar, 1997, 2000).

Karayanni was elected as a member of Member, Israel Academy of Sciences and Humanities (elected 2022); Institut de Droit International (elected 2021); International Academy of Comparative Law.

Among his extra-curriculum activities were a memberships on the following boards: Academic College of Tel Aviv-Yafo; Member, International YMCA, Jerusalem; ACRI, Association for Civil Rights in Israel (2004-2006); School of Peace, Neve Shalom – Wahat Al Salam (2004-2006).

In 2002 Karayanni won the Tseltenr Award for a Young Scholars In 2007 he won the Michael Bruno Memorial Award and in 2021 he won the Tseltner Award for an established scholars

Karayanni's research interest are private international law (conflict of Laws); civil procedure, multiculturalism.

Karayanni is a Palestinian-Arab, was born to a Christian Greek-Orthodox family in Kafr Yasif, a village in the Western Galilee in Israel. He is married to Inas, a computer analyst, and the father of three children. He resides today in Neve Shalom – Wahat el-Salam, a joint Jewish-Arab village located midway between Tel-Aviv and Jerusalem.

== Books ==
- CONFLICTS IN A CONFLICT: A CONFLICT OF LAWS STUDY ON ISRAEL AND THE PALESTINIAN TERRITORIES (Oxford University Press, New York, 2014)
- FORUM NON CONVENIENS IN THE MODERN AGE: A COMPARATIVE AND METHODOLOGICAL ANALYSIS OF ANGLO-AMERICAN LAW (Transnational Publishers, Ardsley, New York, 2004)
- THE PRIVATE INTERNATIONAL LAW OF CLASS ACTIONS: A FUNCTIONAL APPROACH, (The Hague Academy of International Law, 422 RECUEIL DES COURS 17 – 247 (230 pages) (2021)
- A MULTICULTURAL ENTRAPMENT: RELIGION & STATE AMONG THE PALESTINIAN-ARABS IN ISRAEL (Cambridge University Press, 2021) (322 pages);

== Selected publications ==
- The Separate Nature of the Religious Accommodations for the Palestinian-Arab Minority in Israel", 5 NORTHWESTERN UNIVERSITY JOURNAL OF INTERNATIONAL HUMAN RIGHTS 41 (2006)
- Living in a Group of One's Own: Normative Implications Related to the Private Nature of the Religious Accommodations for the Palestinian-Arab Minority in Israel, 6 UCLA JOURNAL OF ISLAMIC AND NEAR EASTERN LAW 1 (2007)
- The Quest for Creative Jurisdiction: The Evolution of Personal Jurisdiction Doctrine of Israeli Courts towards the Palestinian Territories, 29 MICHIGAN JOURNAL OF INTERNATIONAL LAW 665 (2008)
- Adjudicating Culture, 47 OSGOODE HALL LAW JOURNAL 371 (2009)
- Choice of Law under Occupation: How Israeli Law Came to Serve Palestinian Plaintiffs, 5 Journal of Private International Law 1 (2009);
- In the Best Interests of the Group: The Religious Matching Requirement under Israeli Adoption Law, 3 BERKELEY JOURNAL OF MIDDLE EASTERN & ISLAMIC LAW 1 (2010)
- Two Concepts of Group Rights for the Palestinian-Arab Minority under Israel's Constitutional Definition as a 'Jewish and Democratic' State, 10 I.CON. INTERNATIONAL JOURNAL OF CONSTITUTIONAL LAW 304 (2012);
- Access to Justice Ascends to International Civil Litigation: The Case of Palestinian Plaintiffs before Israeli Courts, 33 CIVIL JUSTICE QUARTERLY 41 (2014)
- LE MULTICULTURALISME ET LES AMÉNAGEMENTS RELIGIEUX EN FAVEUR DE LA MINORITÉ ARABE PALESTINIENNE EN ISRAËL, in Droit, Ethique et Religion : de l’âge théologique à l’âge bioéthique » sous la direction de B. FEUILLET-LIGER et P. PORTIER, Collection « Droit et Religion », pp. 305–340 éditions Bruylant, 2012 (French);
- Le droit de la Shari'a en Israël in Abdelwahab Meddeb et Benjamin Stora (dir.), Histoire des relations entre juifs et musulmans du Coran à nos jours, (Paris, Albin Michel, 2013) (French)
- Ne me parlez plus du multiculturalisme! Despropriétés du multiculturalisme et de la minorité arabo-palestinienne en Israël, 215 DIOGENE 38 (2006) (Presses Universitaires de France) (French)
- Multiculturalismo e misure in materia di religione per la minoranza arabo-palestinese in Israele, 9 DIRITTO & QUESTIONI PUBBLICHE, 789 (2009) (Italian)
- Multiculturalism as Covering: On the Accommodation of Minority Religions in Israel, 66 AMERICAN JOURNAL OF COMPARATIVE LAW 831 (2018).
- Groups in Context: An Ontology of a Muslim Headscarf in a Nazareth Catholic School and a Sephardic Ultra-Orthodox Student in Immanuel, 41 LAW & SOCIAL INQUIRY 973 (2016).

To view the above bibliography
