= Abed Abu Shehadeh =

Palestinian journalist (born 1988)

- عبد أبو شحادة
- Born: 1988 (age 37–38); Umm al-Fahm, Israel
- Education: Academic College of Tel Aviv-Yafo
- Occupation: Journalist
- Employer: +972 Magazine
- Political party: Balad
- Spouse: Haneen Eghbariya
- Children: 1
- Relatives: Sami Abu Shehadeh

Abed Abu Shehadeh (Arabic: عبد أبو شحادة, Hebrew: עבד אבו שחאדה; born 1988) is a Palestinian journalist. An Arab citizen of Israel, he has worked as a journalist for Arabic, Hebrew and English-language news outlets, in addition to previously serving as a councillor of Tel Aviv-Yafo Municipal Council for the Balad party.

== Early life and education ==
Abu Shehadeh was born in Umm al-Fahm, a city in Haifa District, and raised in Ajami, a neighbourhood of Jaffa, Israel. His father was a taxi driver and his mother was a childminder; their families had lived in Jaffa for generations and remained there following Operation Hametz. Abu Shehadeh is related to Sami Abu Shehadeh, the leader of the left-wing Palestinian nationalist political party Balad. He is married to Haneen Eghbariya, with whom he has a daughter.

Abu Shehadeh has a master's degree in political science and political philosophy from the Academic College of Tel Aviv-Yafo.

== Career ==
Abu Shehadeh has been described as a "senior activist" for Balad. He was formerly a council member for the party on Tel Aviv-Yafo Municipal Council, but resigned in protest at the Gaza genocide.

Abu Shehadeh works as an editor and journalist for the Haifa-based Arabic news outlet Arab48; the Hebrew-language independent news website Local Call (Hebrew: שיחה מקומית, romanized: Shicha Mekomit); and Last Call's English-language sister publication +972 Magazine. He has also contributed to other outlets, such as The New Arab. In addition to his writing, Abu Shehadeh hosts the podcast Al-Midan (الميدان, 'The Square') for Arab48. Consisting primarily of interviews with prominent Palestinian political figures, it has also included episodes focusing on social issues facing Palestinians in Israel, the West Bank and Gaza, including poverty, high crimes rates and the absence of father figures for young Palestinians.

In 2026, Abu Shehadeh travelled to Doha, Qatar to work as a political analyst covering the 2026 Israeli legislative election for the Qatari television channel Al Jazeera.

== 2026 detention and aftermath ==
On the evening of 3 November 2026, 15 officers from the Israel Police and Shin Bet, the Israeli internal intelligence service, arrested Abu Shehadeh at his home in Jaffa; the property was also searched, with several electronic items seized. His wife stated that no rationale had been given for his arrest, nor where he had been taken by officers.

Officers subsequently presented Abu Shehadeh at Tel Aviv-Yafo Magistrate Court, which authorised his detention until 8 November 2026 on suspicion of him communicating with a "foreign agent". During the hearing, officers from Shin Bet initially identified him as being a journalist, before changing his occupation to "political advisor", reportedly to avoid requiring permission from a prosecutor to interrogate him, which would have been required if he was identified as a journalist. It was reported that the sole evidence used against Abu Shehadeh, in addition to the only topic of his interrogation, was an interview he carried out earlier in 2026 on Al-Midan with Azmi Bishara, a former member of the Knesset for Balad who had lived in exile in Qatar since 2007 after being accused by the Israeli government of espionage and treason in relation to his purported communication with Hezbollah during the 2006 Lebanon War.

The human rights group Adalah, which supported Abu Shehadeh's legal team, stated that he had been interrogated without a lawyer present despite his request to have one, and stated that they had been prevented from seeing the evidence used against him. Adalah described his detention as "political persecution carried out through criminal law", while his lawyer described the charges as "uneccessary, unjustified and unlawful".

On 8 November 2026, Abu Shehadeh was released from a police detention centre in Petah Tikva without charge after Shin Bet and the Israel Police decided not to seek a further extension of his detention at a hearing scheduled for later that day. He was released with restrictions including having his passport confiscated and him being obliged to undergo additional questioning if requested. Following his release, Abu Shehadeh described his detention as "wrongful" and "completely baseless", calling the investigation a "witch hunt" by Shin Bet and the Prime Minister of Israel's office to attempt to "intimidate and silence" Arab voters.

== Response ==
The Committee to Protect Journalists condemned Abu Shehadeh's detention, stating that journalists should not be punished for platforming views critical of the Israeli state. It demanded his immediate and unconditional release. Three Jewish members of the United States Congress, Brad Lander, Daniel Biss and Scott Wiener, called on Israeli authorities to release Abu Shehadeh on 6 November in an open letter sent to Israel's ambassador to the United States, Yechiel Leiter, stating that "interviewing political figures, including controversial ones, is the core work of journalism in a free society". Joint List politician Ofer Cassif described Abu Shehadeh's arrest as being "another chapter in the political persecution of government opponents". Jewish Currents stated that Bishara was not a foreign agent, as he was born and raised in Nazareth and had been a member of the Knesset for 11 years, and that therefore Abu Shehadeh's arrest was unlawful. Index on Censorship described Abu Shehadeh's arrest as being part of the Israeli government's campaign to "punish Palestinian communities in Israel for voting in large numbers" in the 2026 election.
