= Sami Abu Shehadeh =

Palestinian-Israeli politician

- سامي ابو شحادة סאמי אבו שחאדה
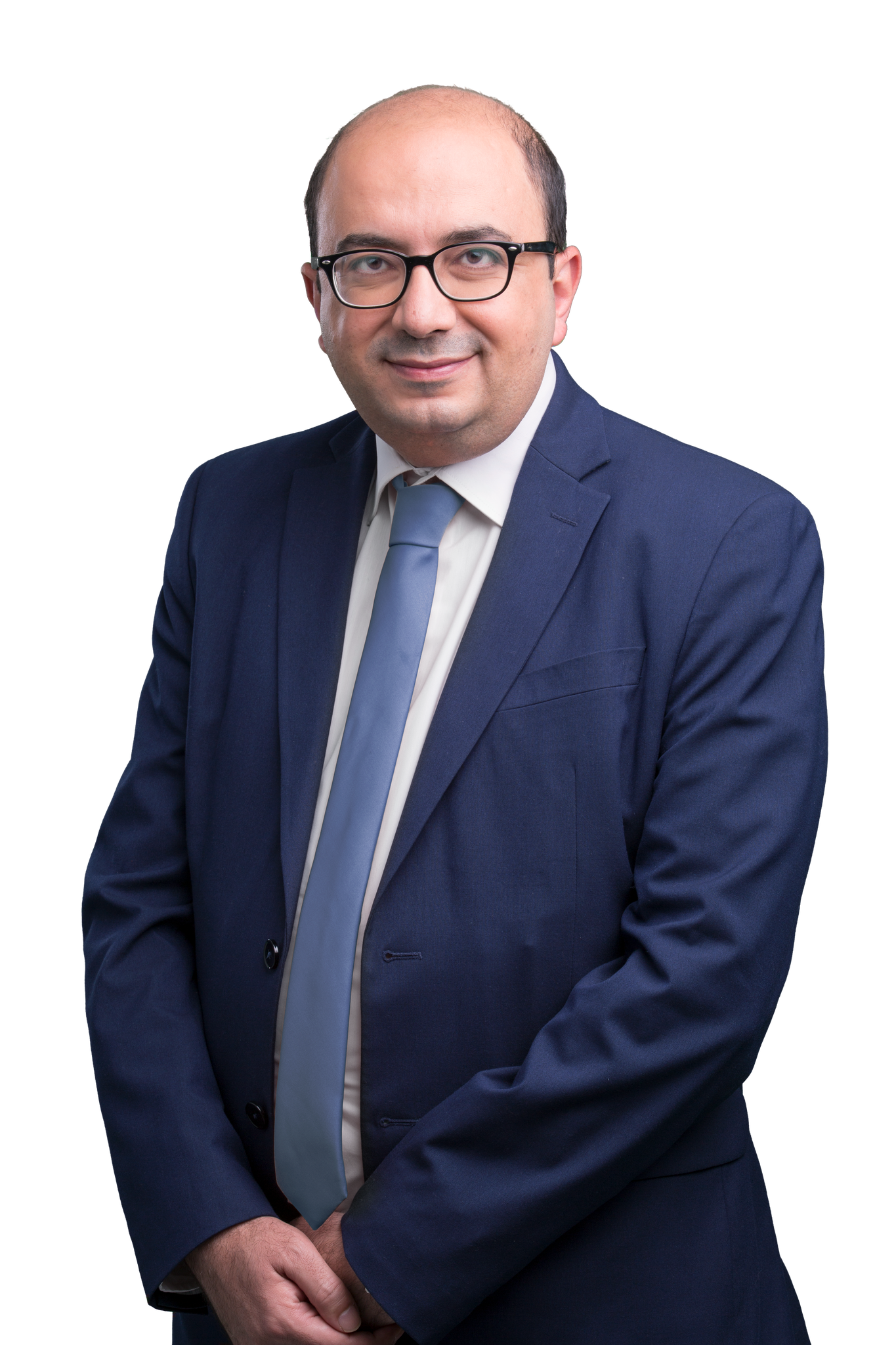

Faction represented in the Knesset
- 2019–2022: Joint List

Personal details
- Born: 19 December 1975 (age 50) Lod, Israel
- Party: Balad

Sami Abu Shehadeh (Arabic: سامي ابو شحادة, Hebrew: סָאמִי אַבּוּ שְׁחַאדַה) is a Palestinian Israeli politician. He is the leader of Balad, and served as a member of the Knesset for the Joint List from 2019 to 2022.

== Biography ==
Abu Shehadeh was born in Lod to a Muslim family and raised in Jaffa. He attended Terra Santa High School, a Catholic school located in Old Jaffa.

Abu Shehadeh studied for a master's degree in Middle Eastern history at Tel Aviv University, and wrote a doctorate on Jaffa as a cultural center during the British Mandate.

== Political career ==
Abu Shehadeh was a member of the Tel Aviv-Yafo City Council for a number of years until 2013, on behalf of the Jaffa faction. He served as the Director of the Yaffa Youth Movement.

In the elections for the 22nd Knesset, he was placed third on the Balad list following the retirement of Mazen Ghnaim, and after uniting with the other Arab parties, he was placed 13th on the Joint List. On 23 January 2021, he was elected as the party chairman of the Balad party in its primaries. In the 2022 Israeli legislative election, he was placed first on the Balad list, however, he lost his seat due to the failure of the party to pass the 3.25% election threshold.

Amid the bombing campaign against Gaza started in retaliation for the Hamas-led incursion into southern Israel from Gaza in the Gaza war, Shehadeh accused U.S. President Joe Biden and other international leaders of giving "a green light for ethnic cleaning" to Israel. Writing in The New Arab, he added that: "Israel is not killing the Hamas leadership; they are not getting revenge out of Hamas. There is collective punishment for 2.2 million people."

Otzma Yehudit petitioned the Central Elections Committee (CEC) to disqualify Abu Shehadeh over an article he wrote on 8 October which described the 7 October attacks as an "important historical event". The party said it displayed "support for armed struggle against Israel", one of the reasons for disqualification under the Basic Laws of Israel. Attorney General of Israel Gali Baharav-Miara did not support his disqualification at the time.

The CEC barred Abu Shehadeh on 23 September 2026 from running in the 2026 Israeli legislative election. A 30-4 vote by the committee disqualified Abu Shehadeh for denying Israel’s existence as a Jewish state and a democratic state. Committee chair Noam Sohlberg, who normally does not vote, broke decades of precedent to vote in favor, while voting in favor of disqualifying him on the basis of support for armed struggle.

Baharav-Miara filed a paper with the Supreme Court of Israel on 29 September calling for his disqualification, on the basis of his support for armed struggle. The court indicated on 1 October that a majority was prepared to disqualify Abu Shehadeh, with President of the Supreme Court of Israel Yitzhak Amit recommending that Abu Shehadeh withdraw his candidacy. Balad withdrew his candidacy the following day by submitting his resignation to the Central Elections Committee.

== Personal life ==
Abu Shehada lives in Jaffa. He is related to journalist Abed Abu Shehadeh.
