= Ajami, Jaffa =

Neighborhood in Tel Aviv-Yafo, Israel

Coordinates: 32°02′42″N 34°45′00″E

Ajami עג'מי العجمي
- Neighborhood of Tel Aviv
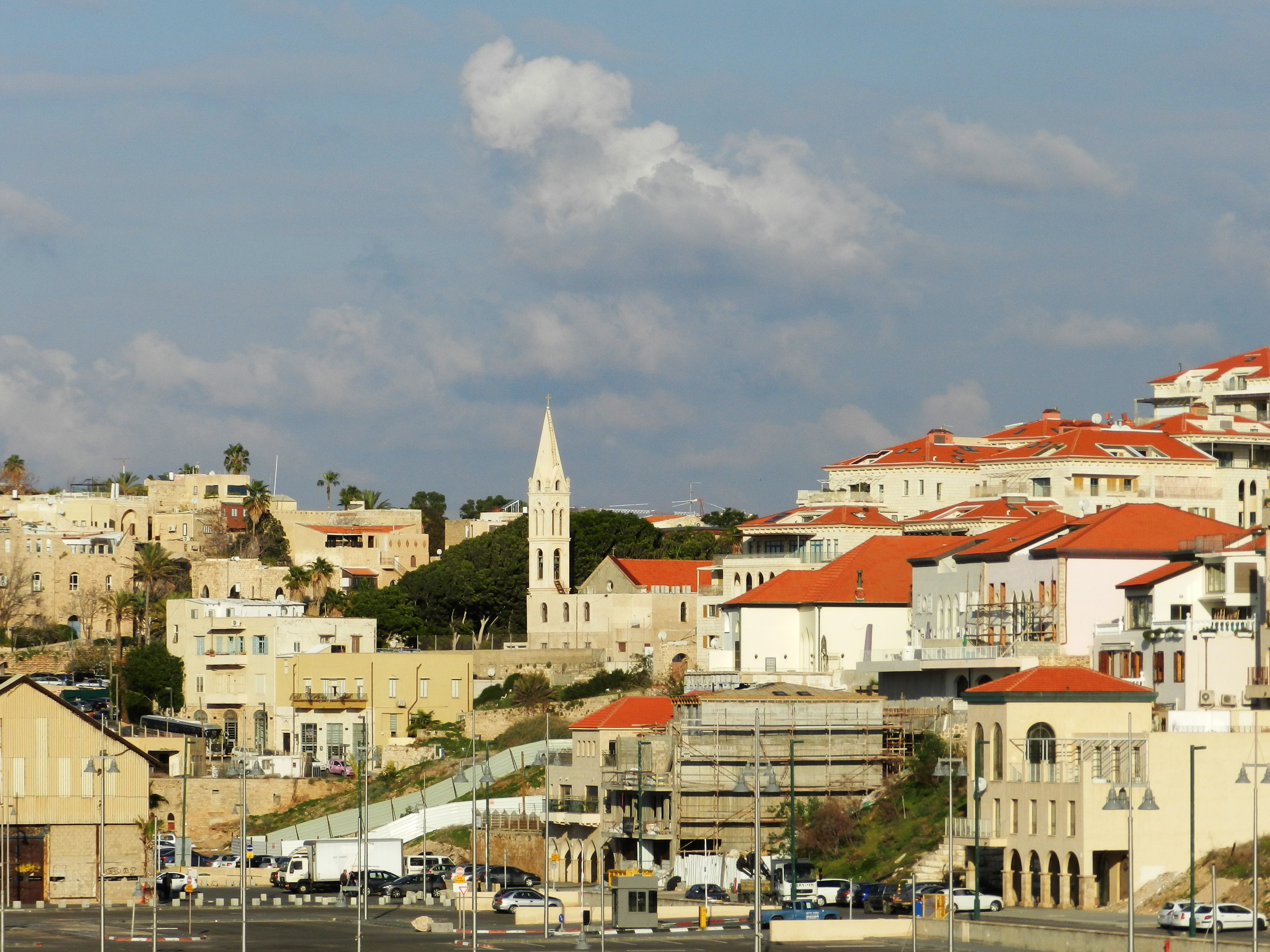
- View of Ajami in 2012
- Interactive map of Ajami
- Country: Israel
- City: Tel Aviv
- Established: 19th century

Ajami (Arabic: العجمي, Hebrew: עג'מי) is a predominantly Arab neighborhood in Tel Aviv, Israel, situated south of Old Jaffa and north of the Jabaliyya neighborhood on the Mediterranean Sea.

It developed in the late 19th century following the demolition of the city walls of Jaffa, and by the 1920s was a densely populated urban area.

== Etymology ==
The neighborhood was named after the maqam of Ibrahim al-Ajami, one of prophet Muhammad's companions. According to a tradition, he was buried in the shrine south of the neighborhood. A later mosque constructed at the site in 1895, al-Ajami, is named for him.

== History ==
=== Ottoman and British eras ===
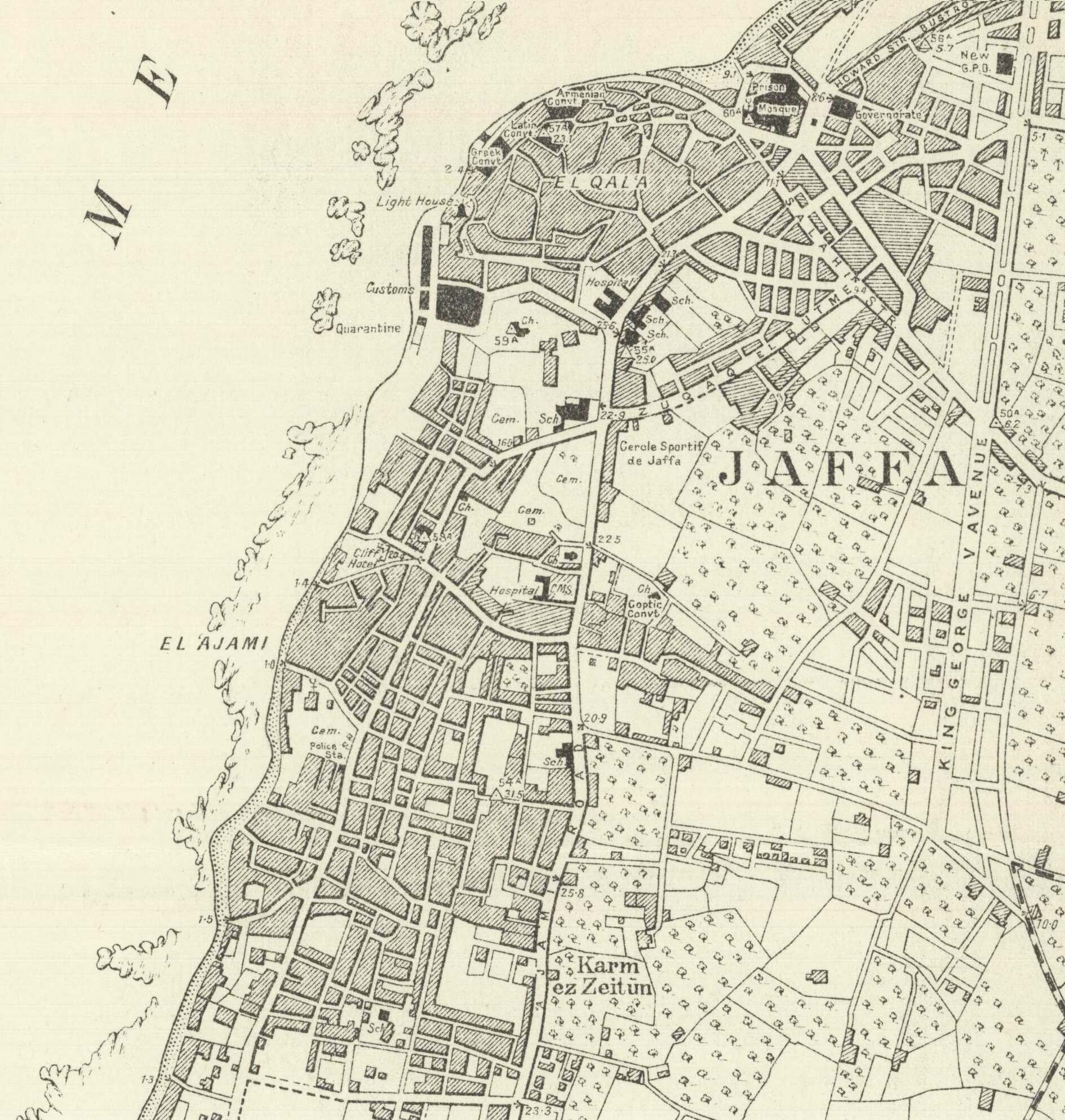
El Ajami, shown as a neighborhood of Jaffa in a 1930 Survey of Palestine map

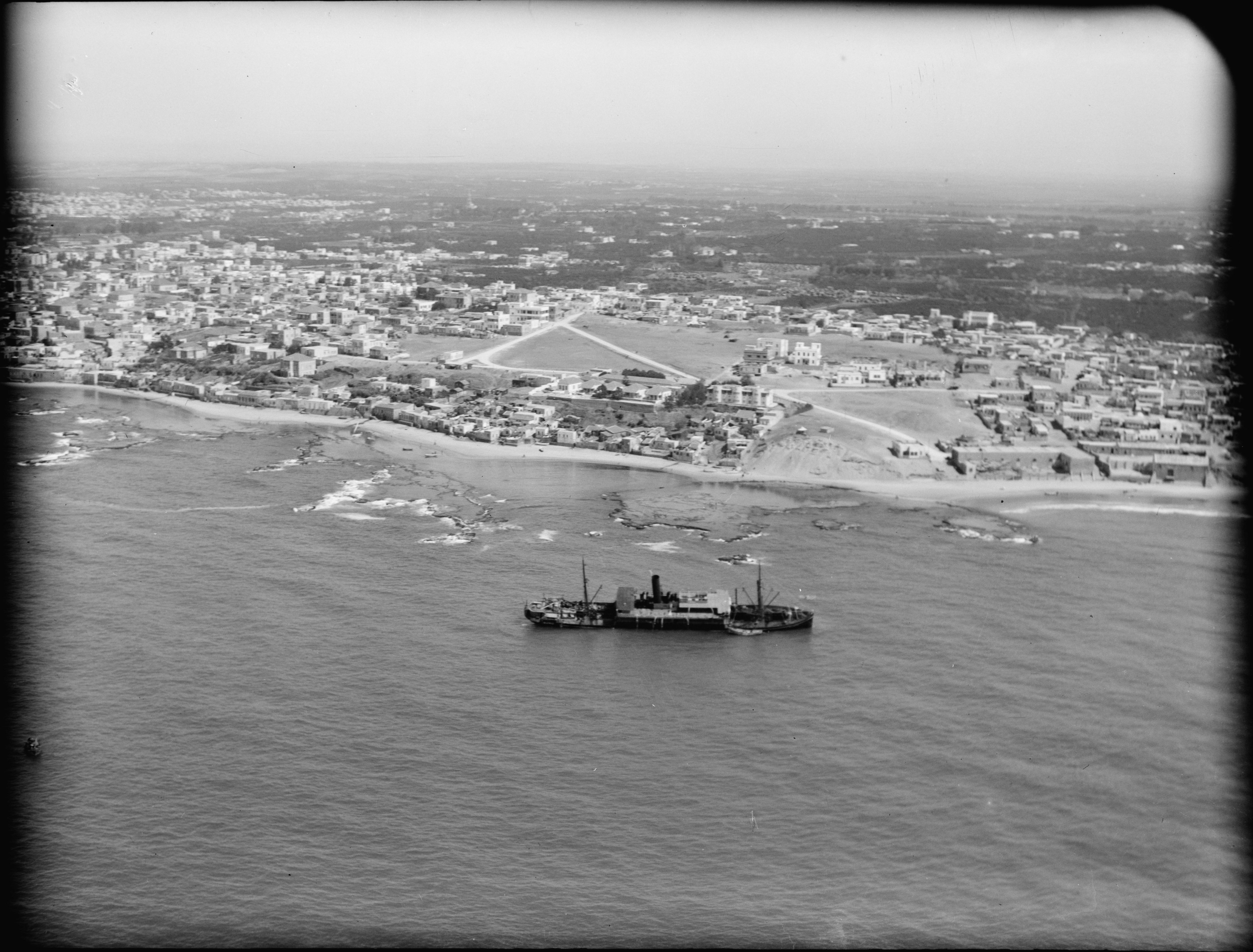
Ajami from the air in 1932

Ajami was founded during Ottoman rule over Palestine at the end of the 19th century, as a small Maronite Christian settlement. The neighborhood's streets were laid parallel to the coast, with ample houses and small stairway-alleys leading down to the shore. A Maronite monastery and church founded in 1855, stood in the nearby harbor. In 1895, Father Antonios Shbeir Ghostaoui, a monk from the Lebanese Maronite Order, built a new church and a monastery on an area of 1,600 square meters. Later on, between 1901 and 1920, the church was demolished and replaced by a bigger and more attractive one, the first stone of which was laid during a grand ceremony on 28 February 1904. This Maronite church still stands today, and it is located in the south tip of Dolphin Street, in the middle of Ajami neighborhood.

The neighborhood's houses were built from limestone surrounded by large courtyards, reflecting the economic ability of its Maronite residents. Being an affluent residential area of the upper middle-class, Ajami had been the first neighborhood of Jaffa – in fact in the whole of Palestine - to be swiftly and fully connected to the new electric grid which had been built by the Jaffa Electric Company in 1923

=== 1948 war and establishment of Israel ===
Ajami played a significant role in the history of Jaffa including the 1948 Palestine war and the events of the Nakba. Following the decision by the British Government to end the Mandate for Palestine, violence erupted between the Jewish paramilitary groups (Haganah and Irgun) and Palestinian Arab irregulars. Jaffa witnessed some of the most violent of these encounters. On 13 May 1948, the day before the declaration of the Israeli state, Jaffa surrendered; the remaining Arab residents were forced to move into Ajami, where they were subject to martial law. By the end of the war, it is estimated that over 90% of Jaffa's Palestinian Arab residents fled or were expelled, as part of the larger 1948 Palestinian expulsion and flight, leaving only ~3,000 Palestinians remaining in Jaffa.

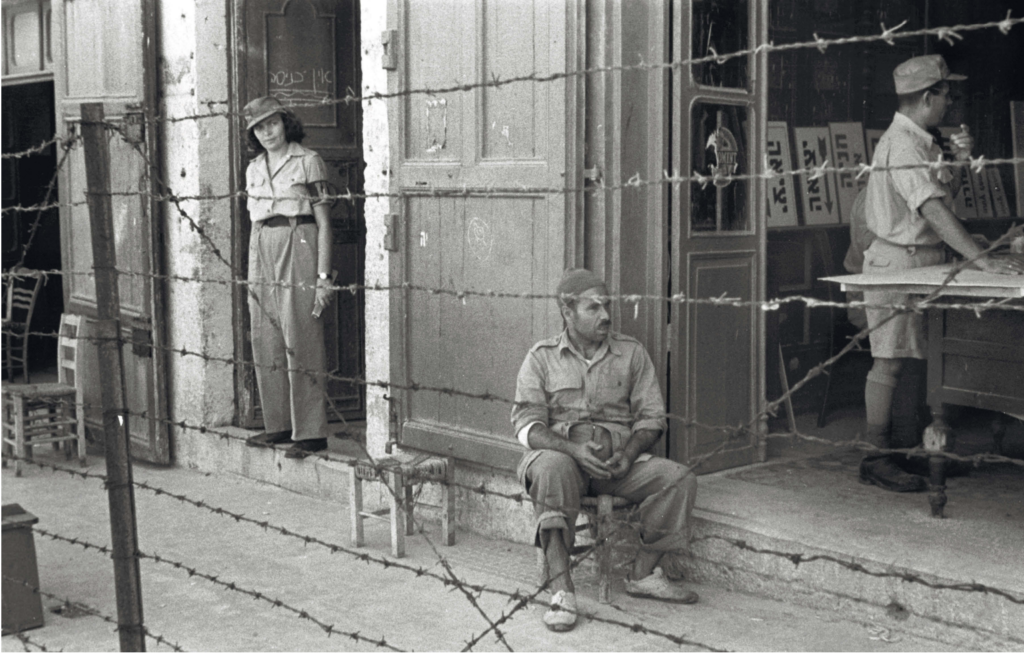
Barbed-wire separating the Arab neighbourhood, or "ghetto", of Ajami in 1948

After the establishment of the State of Israel, the Israeli government tried to separate Jews and Palestinians of Jaffa: “It will be best to have special areas for the Jews and areas for the Arabs,” said the military governor Meir Laniado. Palestinians were moved to Ajami, which was surrounded on all sides by Jewish quarters. Moshe Erem from the Israeli Ministry for Minority Affairs protested to Minister Bechor-Shalom Sheetrit: “Ajami is about to be closed off with a barbed-wire fence that will rigorously separate the Arab neighborhood and the Jewish section. That arrangement will immediately render Ajami a sealed-off ghetto. It is hard to accept this idea, which stirs in us associations of excessive horror. … And once more we are thereby sowing a toxic seed … in the heart of the Arabs. A ghetto in barbed wire, a ghetto, cut off from access to the sea. Shall this be our political approach?” Palestinians needed special permits “to exit the barbed wire.”

Over the years, Ajami became run-down and neglected, and was reported to be the lowest-income neighborhood in Tel Aviv-Yafo despite being known for its palatial villas and unique architectural styles prior to 1948. The neighborhood suffers from a severe housing crisis and drug use.

=== Gentrification projects ===
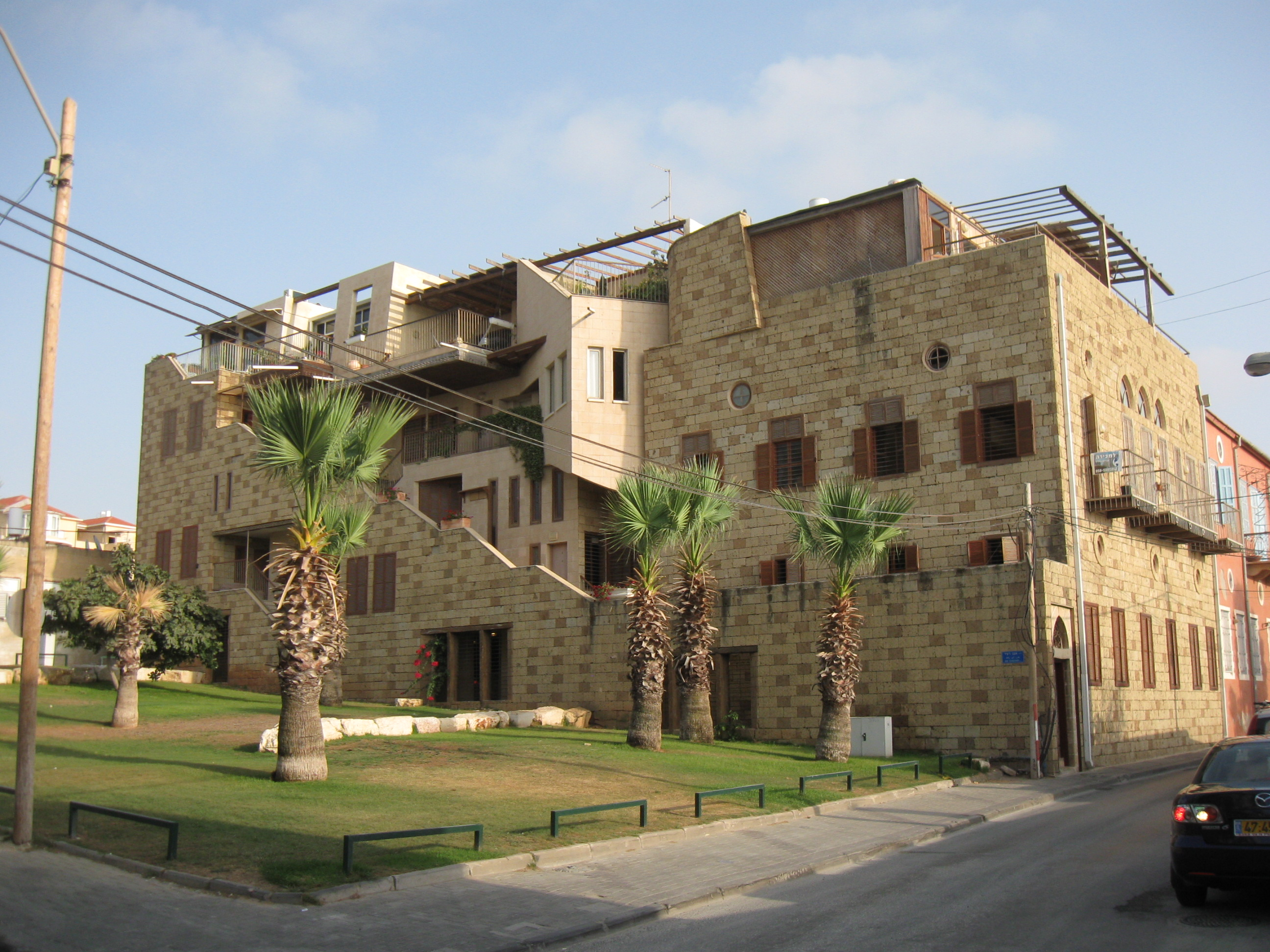
Restored historic building

Despite these socio-economic problems and the neighborhood's severe housing crisis, the Tel Aviv-Yafo municipality drew up plans to develop the neighborhood, which subsequently increased housing prices and led to the exodus of a growing number of Palestinian residents. Many of Ajami's Arab residents feel that they have come to suffer under Tel Aviv-Yafo's Municipality's plans to 'develop' the neighborhood. Since the start of the gentrification process, many wealthy Jewish Israelis have moved into the neighborhood.

In addition, some 497 eviction and demolition orders have been served by the Amidar, Israel's government-operated public housing company, targeting Ajami and Jabaliyya residents. Ajami residents claim that this is a result of discriminatory policies which date back to the establishment of the Israeli state, but the Amidar company says they are illegal squatters.

The housing crisis developed political overtones when one of the housing projects, B'emuna, said its apartments would be sold only to members of the religious-Zionist community. In February 2010, the Tel Aviv District Court dismissed a stop work petition presented by 27 Ajami residents, which argued that the stipulation that housing in the project be available only to religious Jews discriminated against the neighborhood's Arab residents. In November 2010, the Supreme Court of Israel rejected the appeal and upheld the continuation of the project.

== Landmarks ==
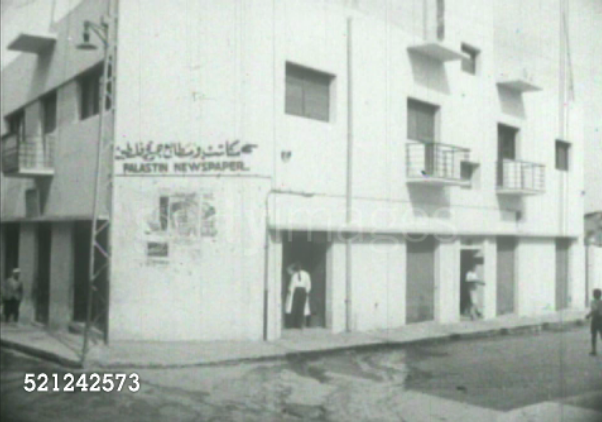
Falastin newspaper headquarters in Ajami neighborhood, 1938

=== The Maronite Church ===
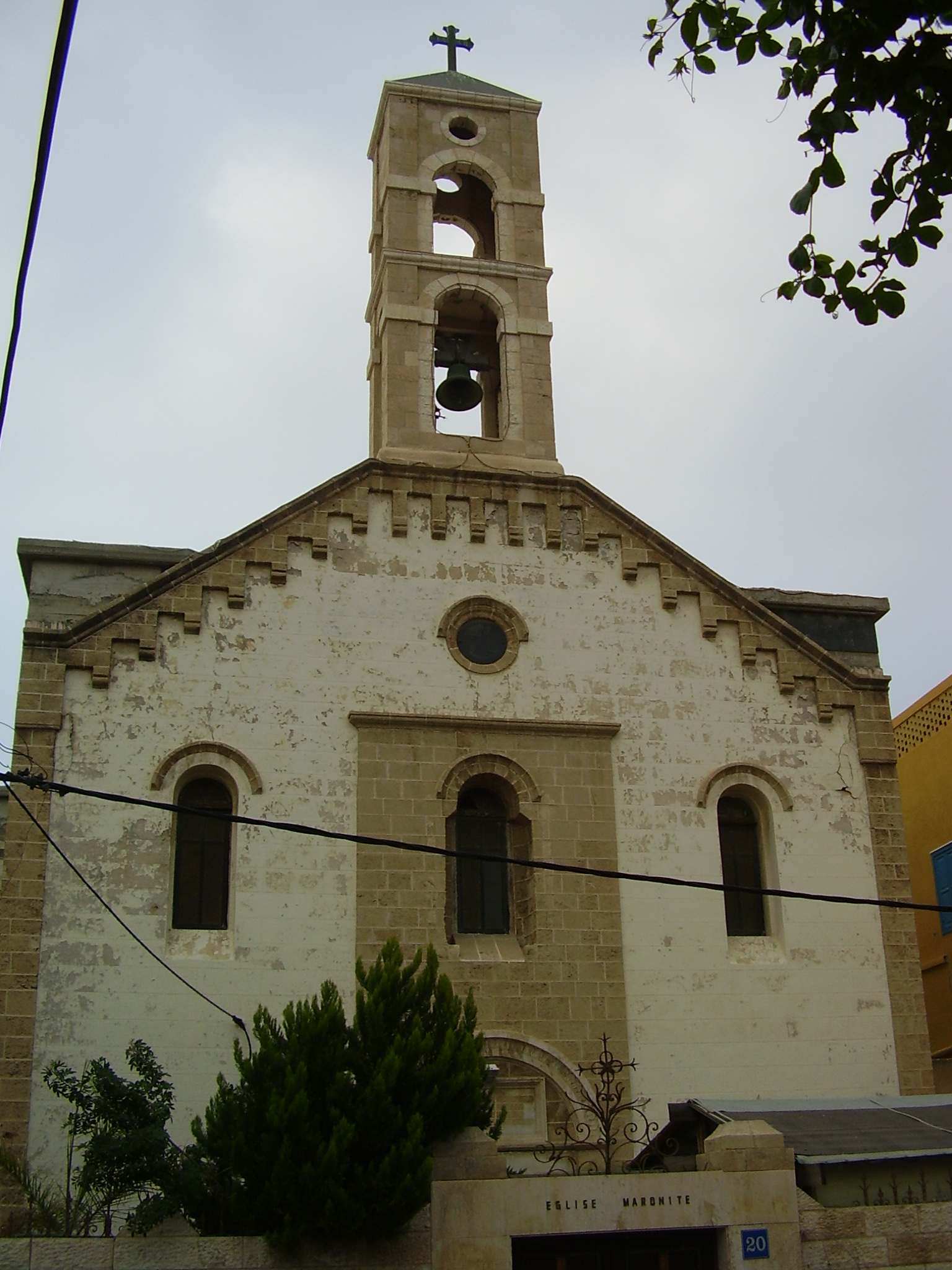
The Maronite Church of Ajami, Jaffa.

First established in 1895, by Father Antonios Shbeir Ghostaoui, a monk from the Lebanese Maronite Order, this Church replaced an even older church and monastery founded in 1855 and formerly located in the nearby harbor. The Maronite Church of Ajami is located in the south tip of Dolphin Street, in the middle the neighborhood.

=== Al-Ajami Mosque ===
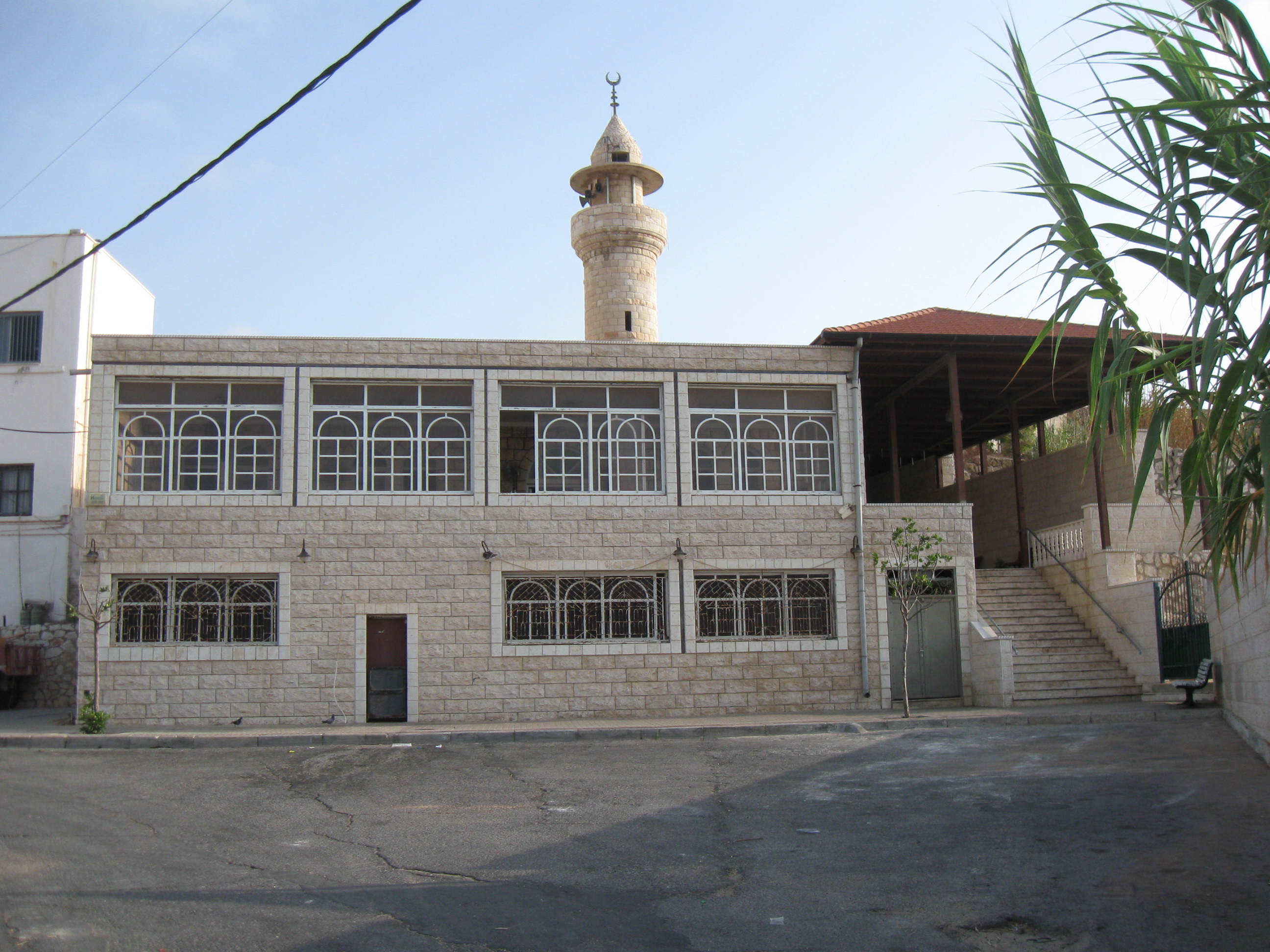
Al-Ajami Mosque in Jaffa

The Ajami Mosque was established by Haj Yousef-Al-Manawi in 1895 on the shrine of Sheikh Ibrahim-Al-Ajami. It is located in the northern part of Ajami next to the Hassan Arafeh public school. Under British rule, Ajami Mosque was the only mosque open for daily prayers. The mosque and the adjoining school were previously owned by the Islamic Waqf, until the Israeli authorities annulled their status as Waqf property under Israel's Absentee's Property Law.

=== Arab-Jewish community center ===
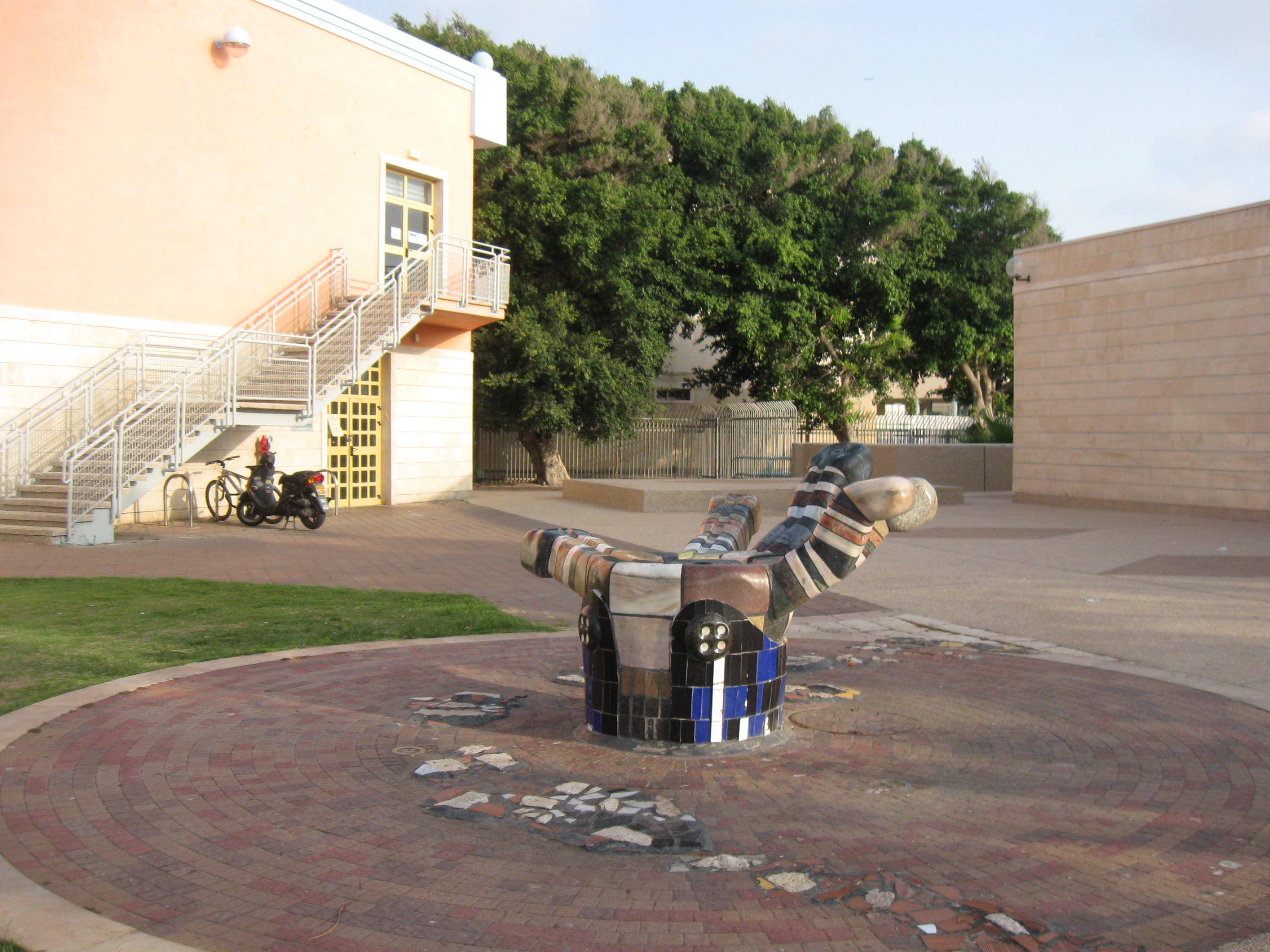
The Arab Jewish Community Center in Ajami

Ajami is the location of the Jaffa AJCC, a municipal community center in Tel Aviv-Yafo catering to Jewish, Christian, and Muslim populations in the city. The center was established in 1993, bringing together conflicting populations and educating towards reconciliation, recognition and cooperation. Both facilitated and unmediated encounters take place at the center between members of Jaffa's diverse ethnic and age groups, including children from Jewish and Arab kindergartens, elementary and high school students, and adults.

=== Peres Center for Peace ===
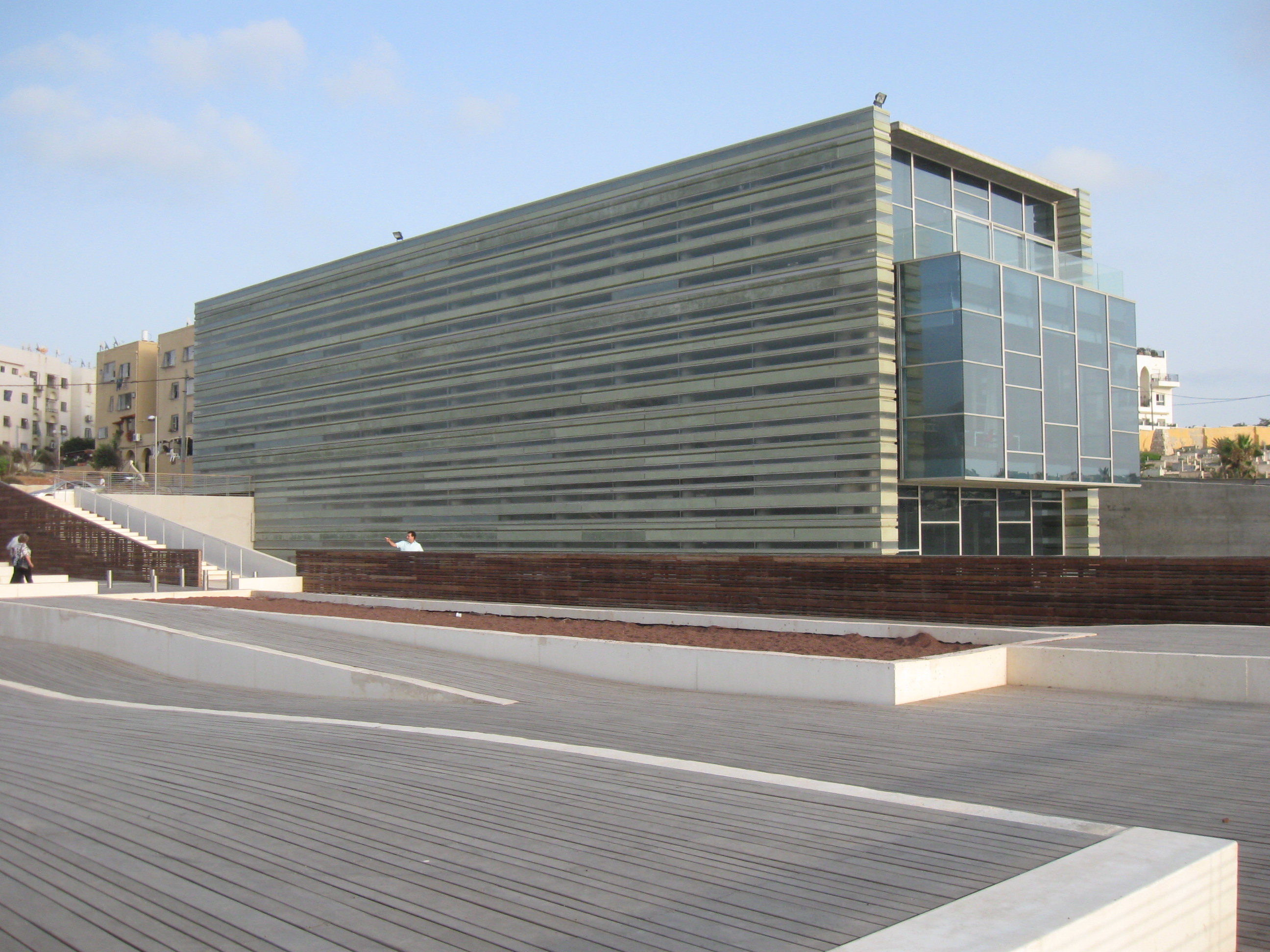
Peres Center for Peace

The Peres Center for Peace, located in the southern tip of Ajami, opened in December 2009 after 10 years of planning and construction. The building (2,500 sq.m.), a distinctive architectural landmark on the Jaffa coast, was designed by Italian architect Massimiliano Fuksas.

== Tourism and recreation ==
"The Old Man and the Sea" is a popular Arab seafood restaurant in the southern part of Ajami. Abu Hassan is a small hummus restaurant located on the northern tip of Ajami. It was opened in 1959 by Ali Karawan and now has two additional branches in Jaffa.

== Notable residents ==
- Abed Abu Shehadeh (born 1988) - Palestinian journalist, former member of Tel Aviv-Yafo Municipal Council.
- Rifaat Turk (born 1954) - Arab-Israeli Team Israel Olympic footballer, Deputy Mayor of Tel Aviv

== Film ==
The 2009 Israeli film Ajami directed by Scandar Copti and Yaron Shani was nominated as a foreign language film for the 2010 Academy Awards. Many characters in the film were played by non-professional actors who lived in Ajami.

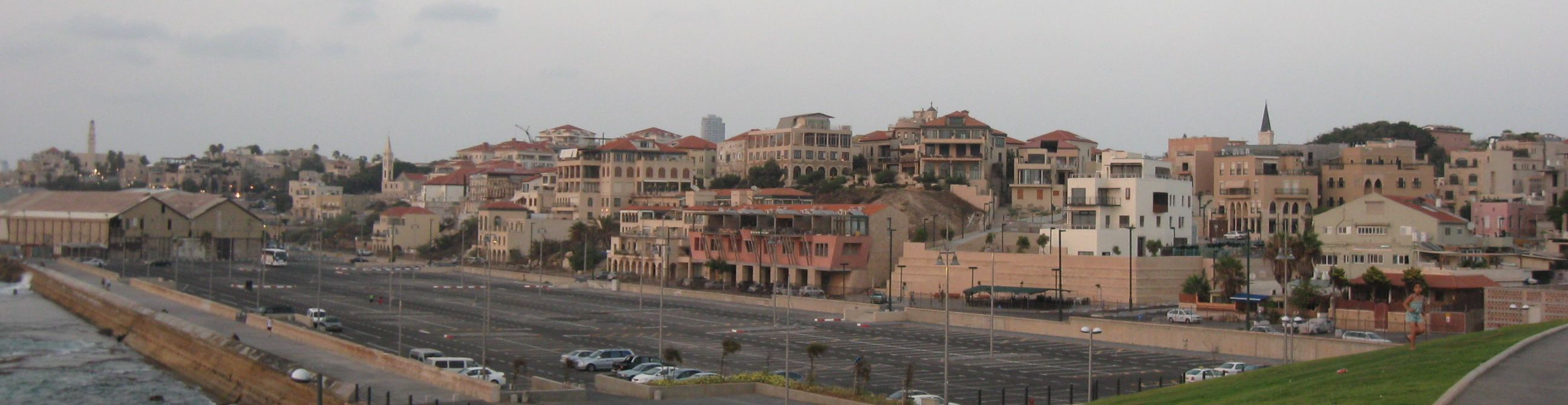

== Gallery ==
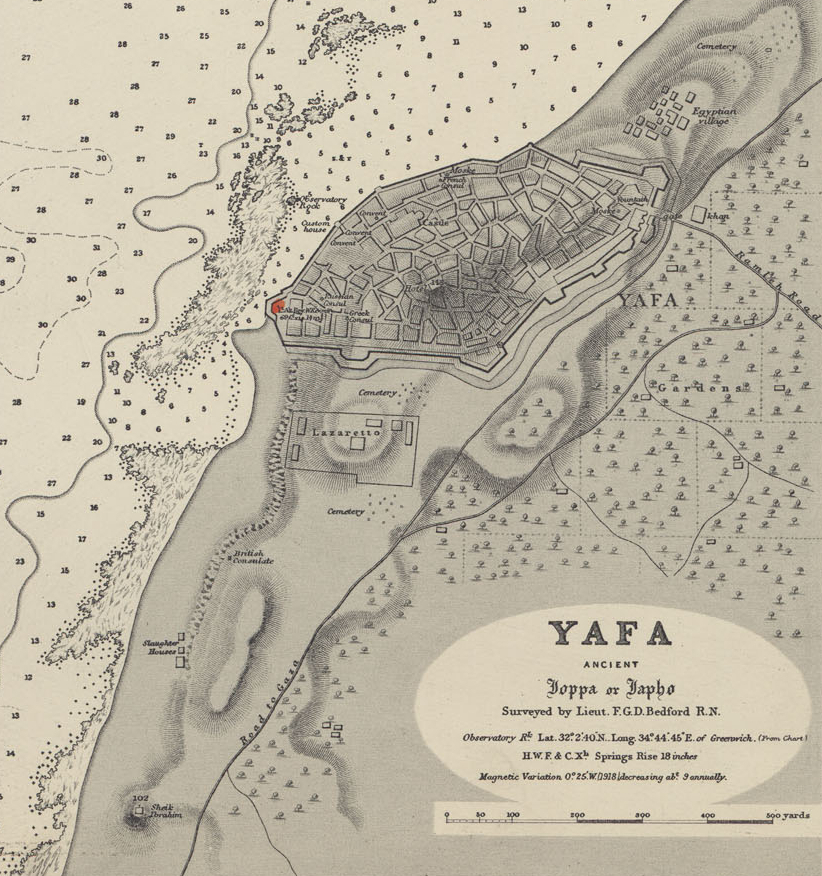
The area in Frederick Bedford's 1863 map

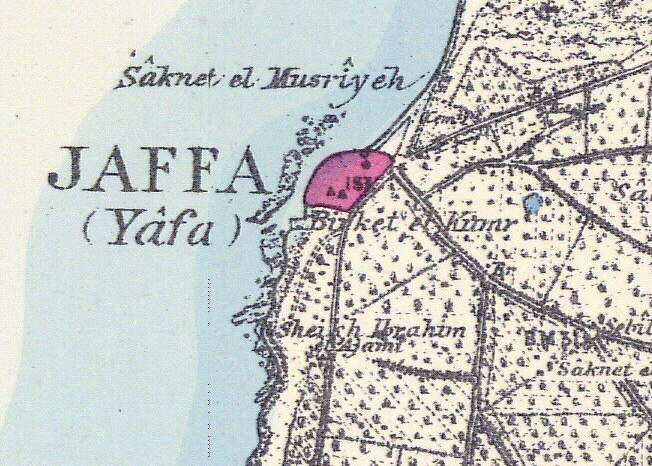
The area in the PEF Survey of Palestine (c.1880)

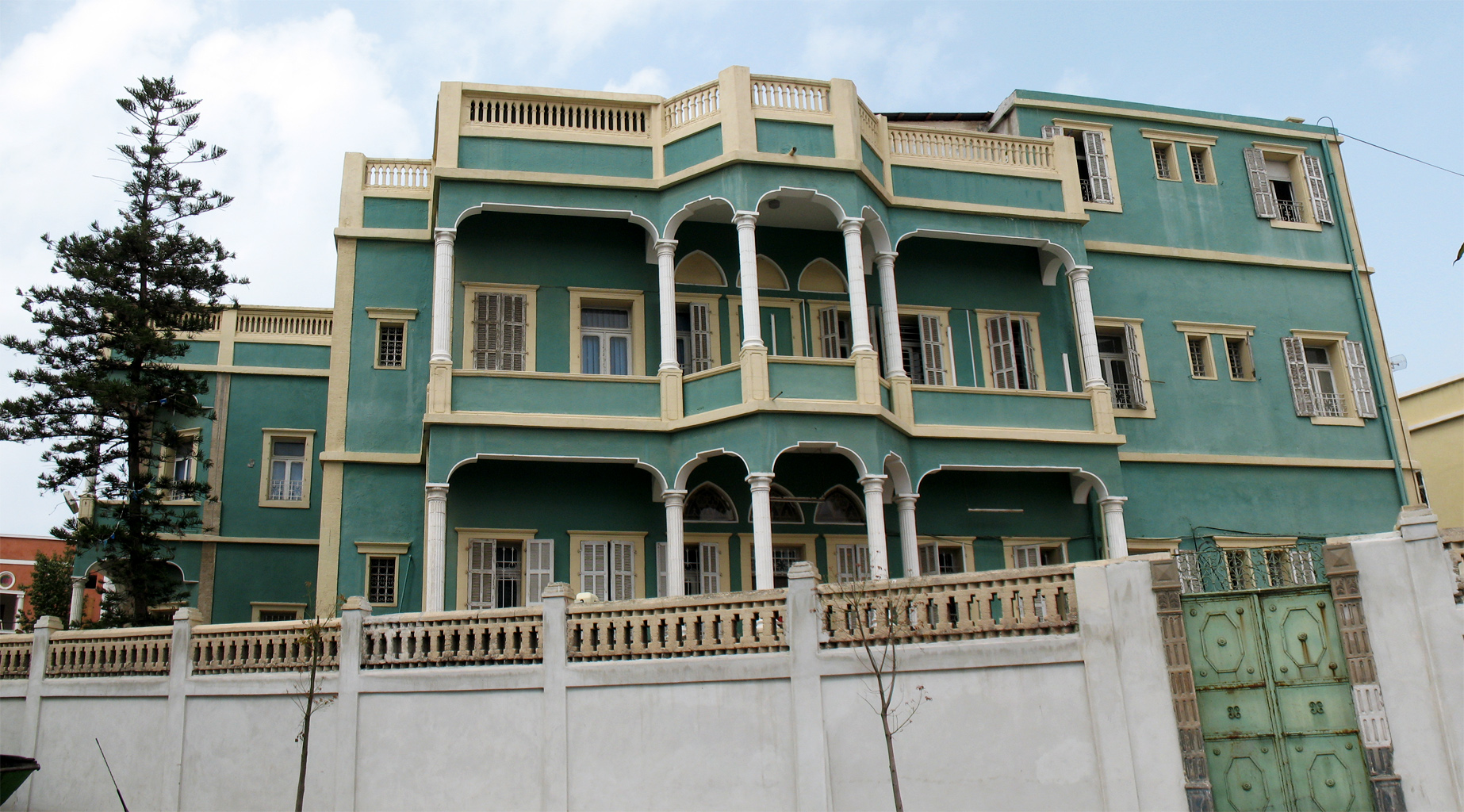
Green House (central military court building)

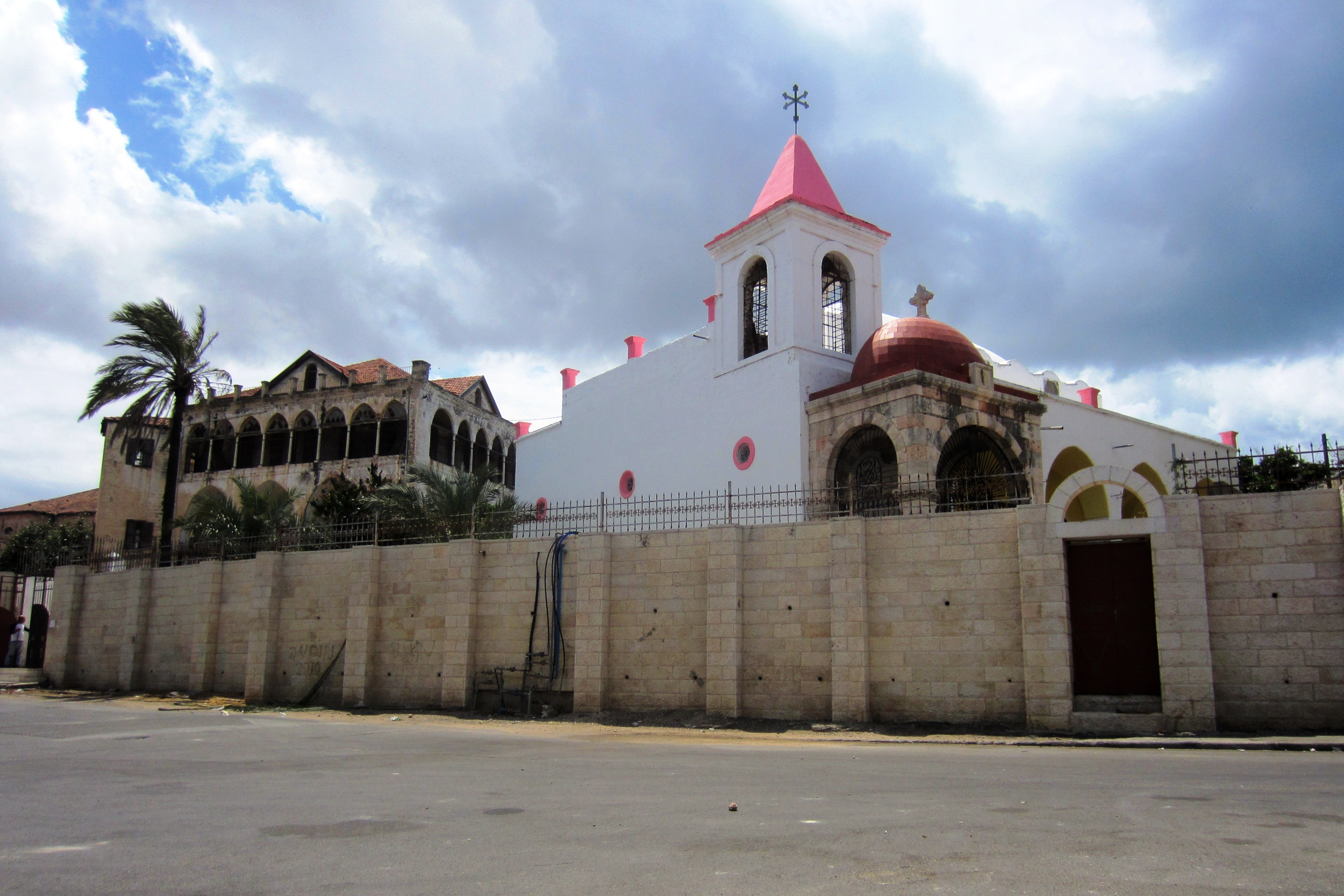
Saint Anthony Coptic Church in the middle of Ajami neighborhood

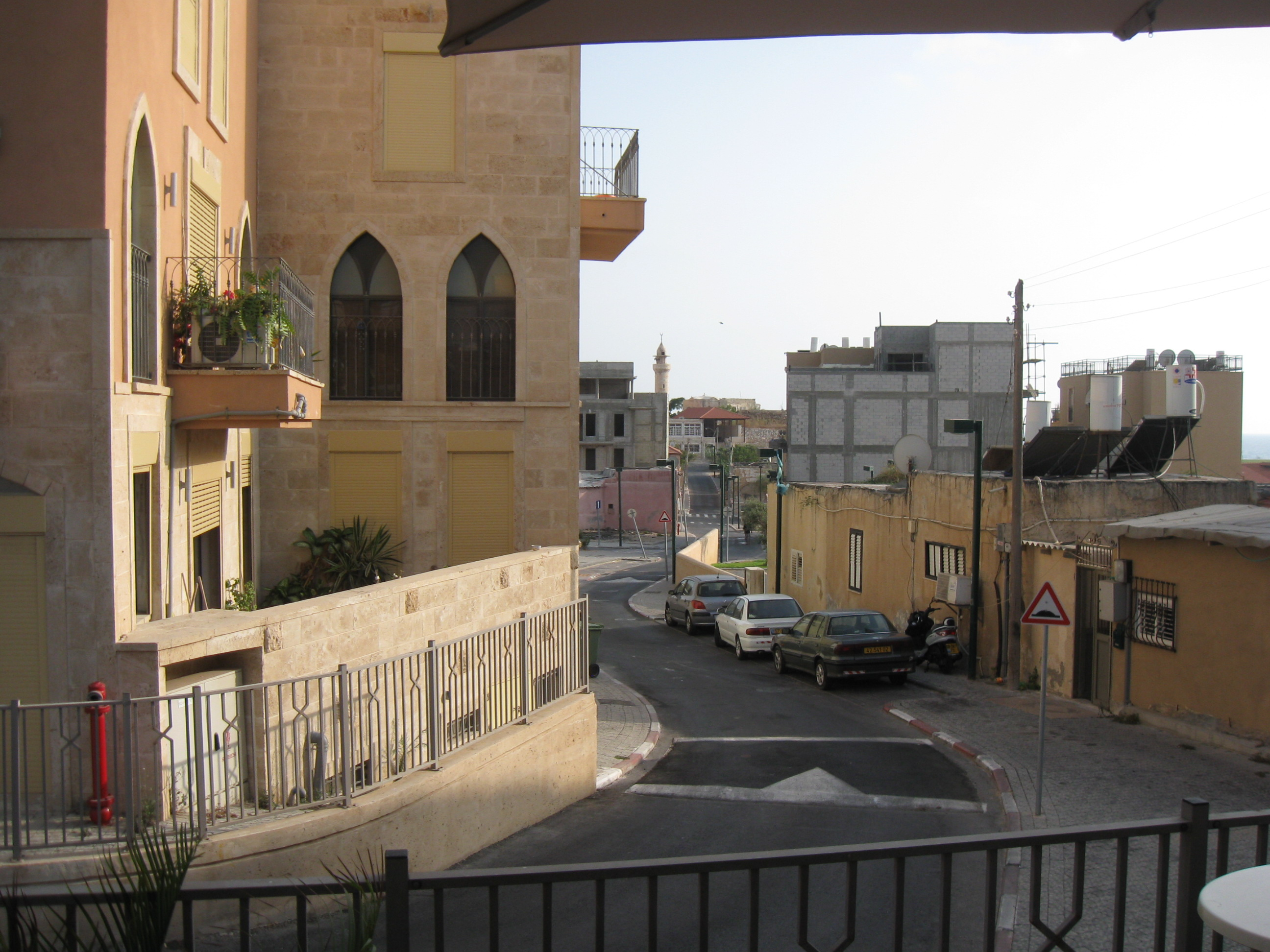
Ha-Ogen street in Ajami, 2010

== See also ==
- History of Tel Aviv
