= Jerusalem AIDS Project =

- Abbreviation: JAIP
- Formation: 1986
- Type: Non-governmental organization
- Legal status: Non-profit
- Purpose: HIV/AIDS prevention and education
- Headquarters: Jerusalem, Israel
- Region served: International
- Methods: Project management, capacity building, advocacy, research, training, education
- Affiliations: World Health Organization, UNAIDS

The Jerusalem AIDS Project (JAIP) is an international HIV/AIDS-focused NGO, founded in 1986 and based in Jerusalem, Israel. It is a national (Israel), regional (Middle East) and international leader in HIV/AIDS prevention efforts in young people, including school pupils, university students and men and women in uniform, commended by the United Nations in 2006 for its approach.

== Activities ==
The major areas of work of JAP include project management, capacity building, advocacy, research and technical assistance to countries and organizations, services and consultation in training, and formal education and non-formal education to youth settings.

JAIP has developed models for HIV prevention, which have been adopted in 27 countries in Latin America, Asia, Africa and Eastern Europe. JAIP's operations are conducted in cooperation with professional international bodies such as World Health Organization and UNAIDS.
