= Academic College of Tel Aviv-Yafo =

Public Academic college in Jaffa, Tel Aviv, Israel

The Academic College of Tel Aviv-Yafo
- המכללה האקדמית תל אביב-יפו
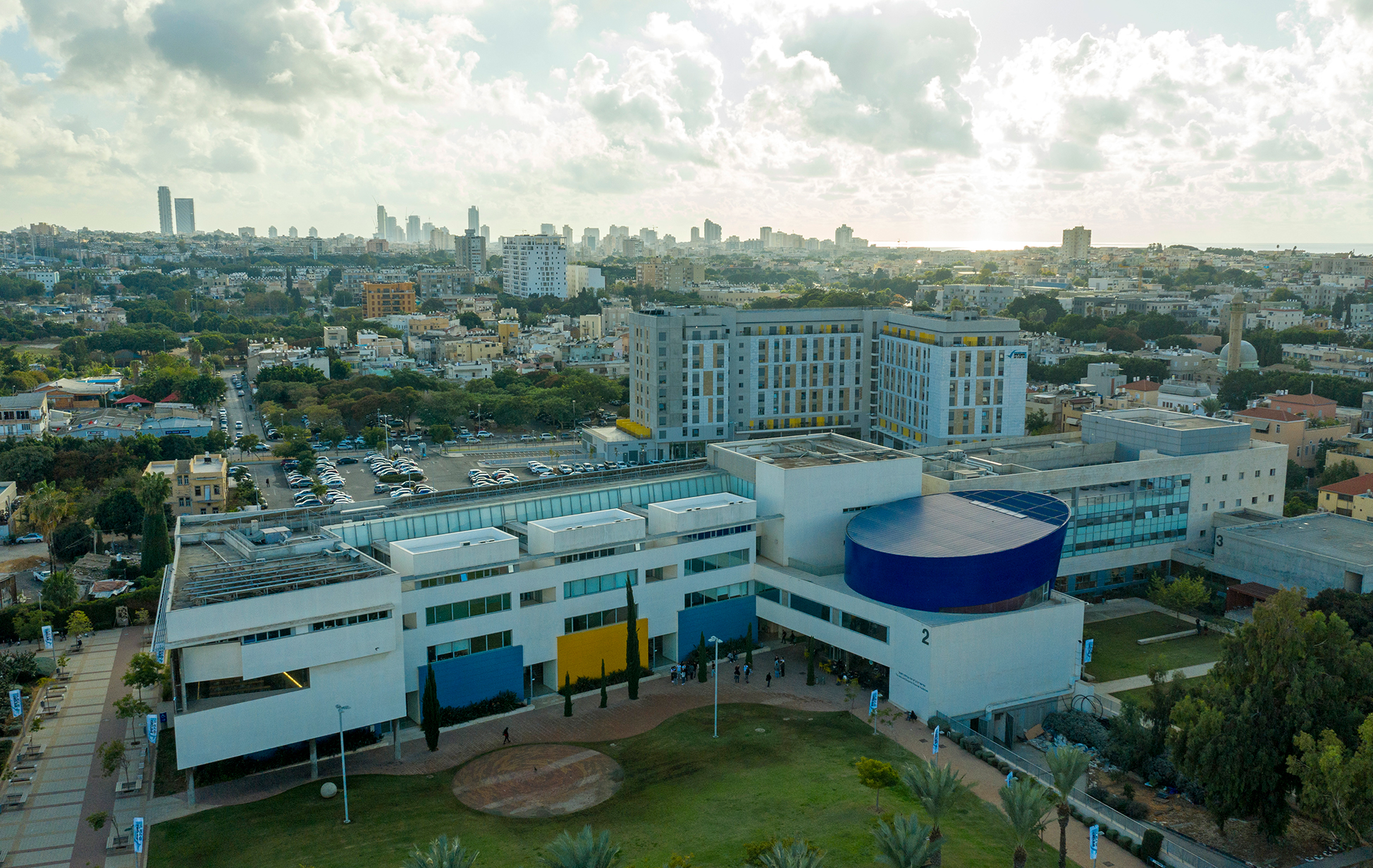
- An aerial view of Tel Aviv-Yafo Academic College
- Type: Public college
- Established: 1994
- Chairman: Amir Halevi
- President: Dror Wahrman
- Rector: Michal Parnas
- Principal: Elie Mersel
- Students: 4,251
- Undergraduates: 3,487
- Postgraduates: 764
- Location: Tel Aviv, Israel; 32°02′49″N 34°45′37″E
- Campus: Urban
- Website: www.int.mta.ac.il Building details

The Academic College of Tel Aviv-Yafo (Hebrew: המכללה האקדמית תל אביב יפו, HaAkademit Tel Aviv Yaffo) is a public college based in Tel Aviv, Israel. It is authorized to grant its graduates bachelor's degrees (BA, BSc and BSN) and masters degrees (MA, MSc and MBA).

== History ==
The Academic College of Tel Aviv-Yafo was established in 1994 as a joint initiative of Tel Aviv University, Tel Aviv-Yafo Municipality and the Planning and Budgeting Committee of the Council for Higher Education as a public college. The inaugural president of the college was Professor Elazar Kochva, a zoologist affiliated with Tel Aviv University and one of the college's founding proponents, served in this role until 2000.

In the first years of its operation, the college operated on four small campuses throughout Tel Aviv-Yafo: on Antokolsky Street, the School of Computer Sciences, on Dafna Street, the School of Behavioral Sciences, on Szold Street, the School of Computer Sciences and on Melchet Street - the School of Economics and Management and the School of Government and Society. The current campus of the college was constructed on the site formerly occupied by the remains of the Eisenberg Hospital in Yafo.

In 2019, student dormitories with 400 rooms were inaugurated on campus.

== Academics ==
The college offers bachelor's degree studies in computer science, economics and management, information systems, psychology, nursing, and philosophy-economics-political combined degree (PAKAM).

Master's degree studies are held in computer science, information systems, psychology, science, business administration, consulting and organizational development, and family studies.

The college also hosts several institutions, including the RISE IMPACT Institute for Social and Economic Research, the "House of Israeli Art," a research institute dedicated to Israeli art, the SEED Center for Early Emotional Development, and the Mifrasim Institute for Psychotherapy Research and Teaching.

== Presidents ==
- 1994-2000 - Prof. Elazar Kochva
- 2000-2008 - Prof. Nehemia Friedland
- 2008-2011 - Prof. Israel Zang
- 2011-2014 - Prof. Nehemia Friedland
- 2014-2020 - Prof. Shlomo Biderman
- 2020-2024 - Prof. Dror Wahrman
- 2024-Current - Prof. Galia Sabar

== Notable alumni ==
- Abed Abu Shehadeh (born 1988), journalist.

== Images ==
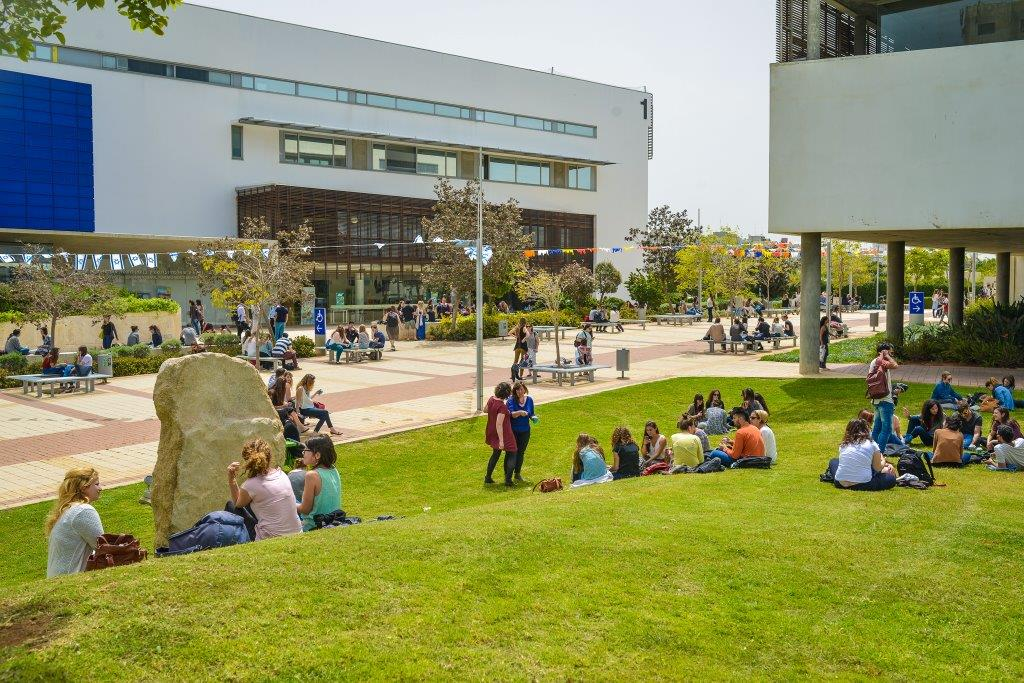
Building 1 - Fomento-Mexico

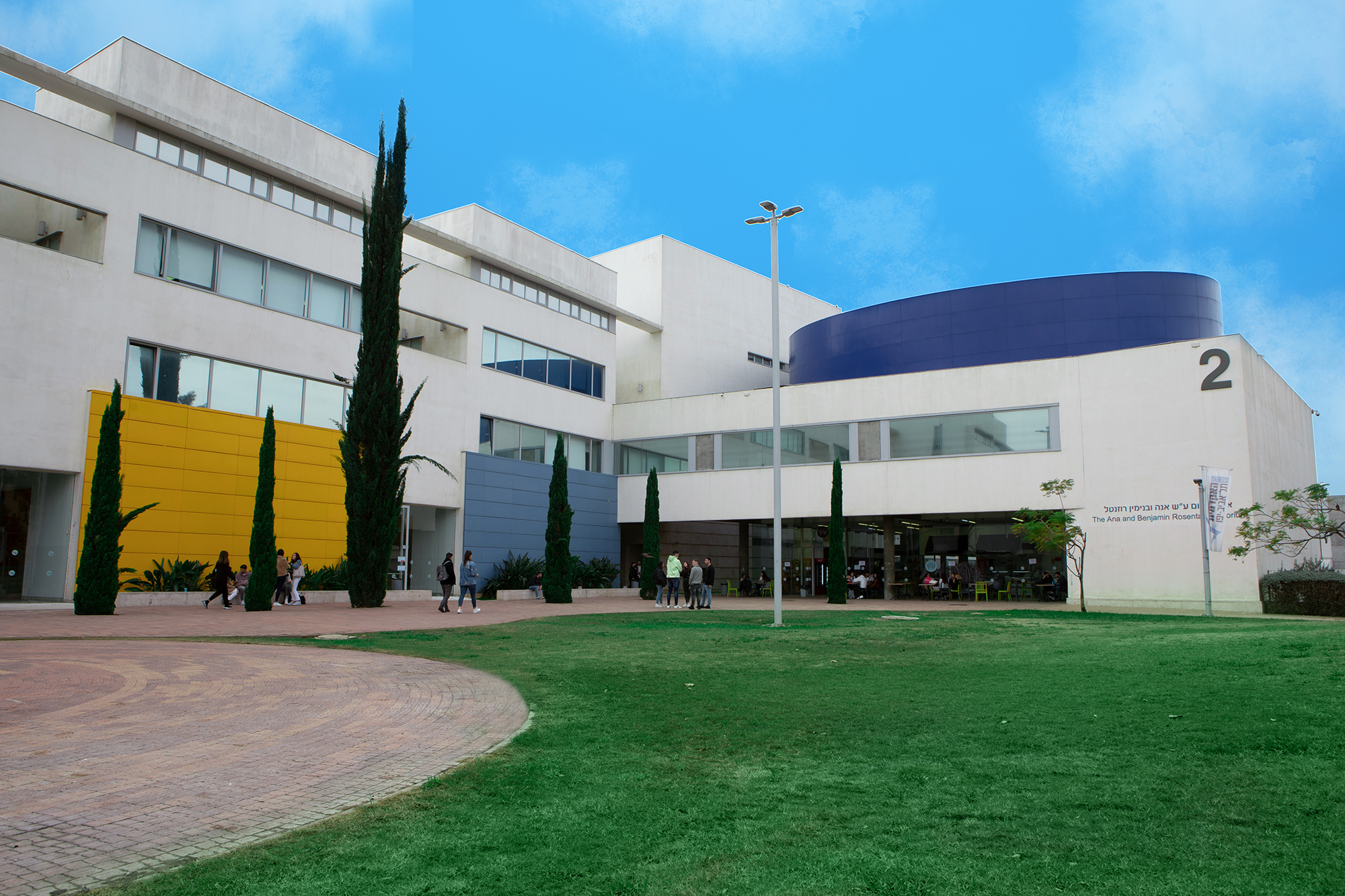
Building 2 - Judy and Josh Weston

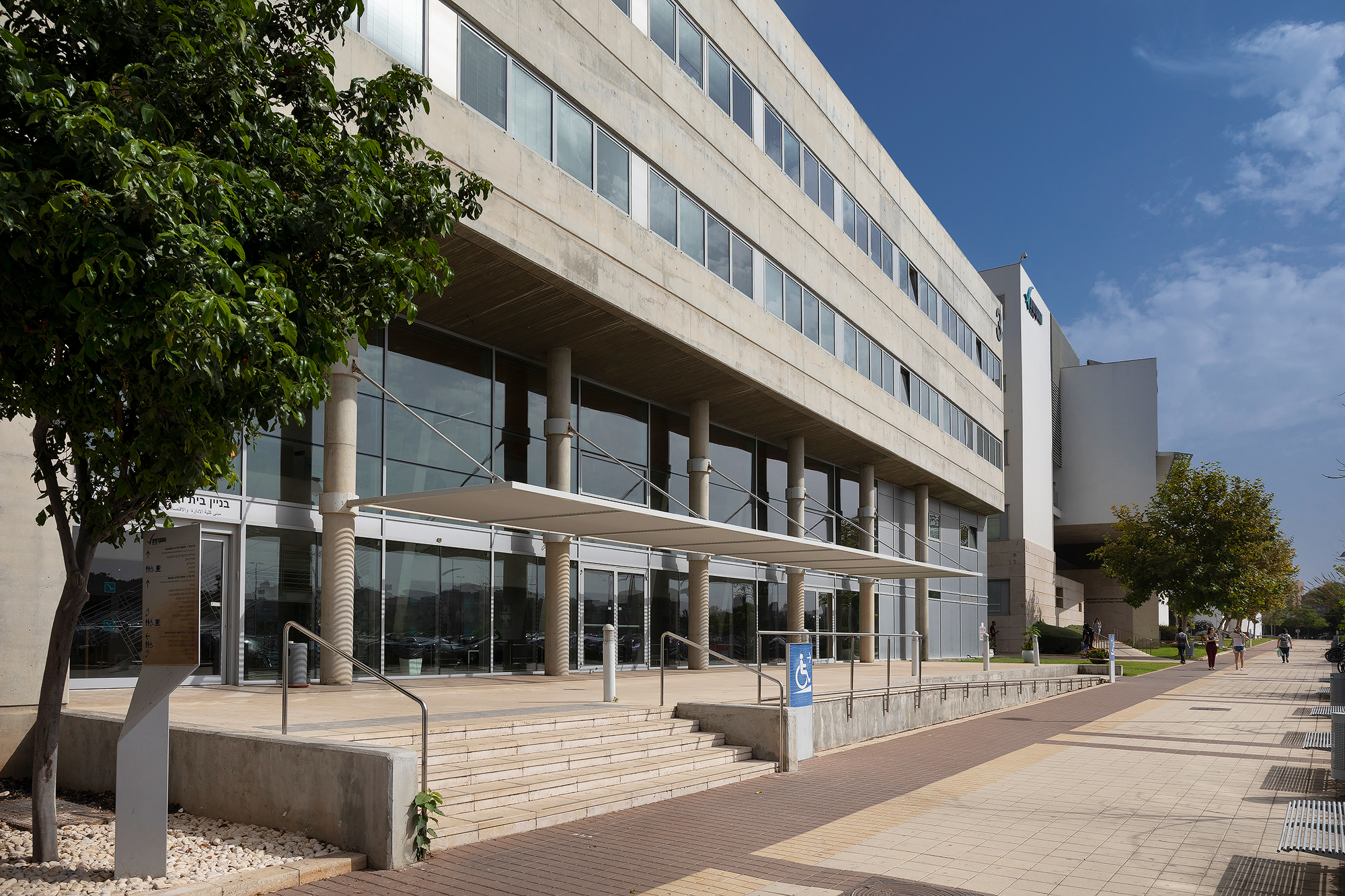
Building 3 - School of management and Economy

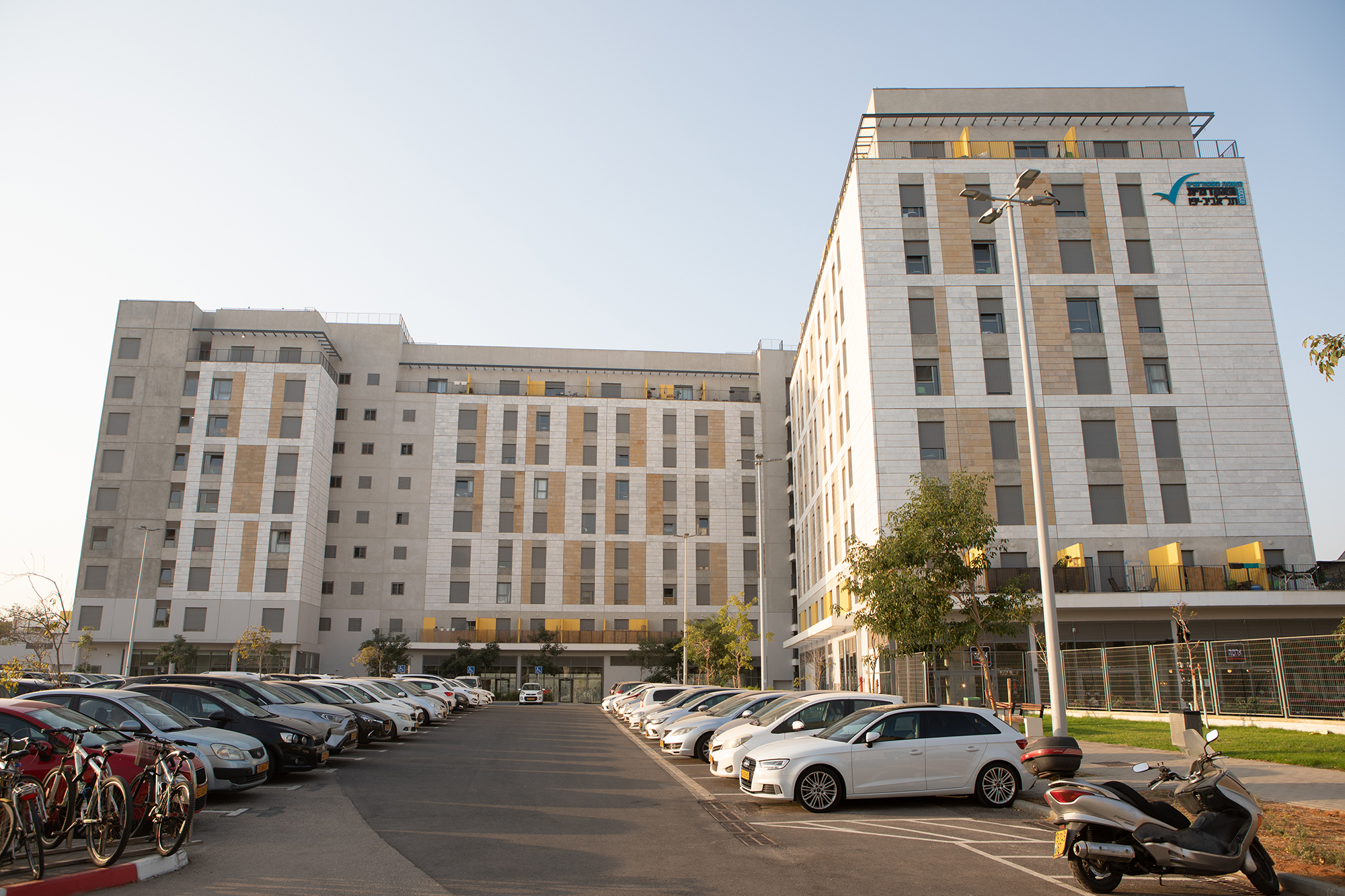
Student dormitories

== See also ==
- List of Israeli universities and colleges
- Education in Israel
