= Freeman (surname) =

Freeman is a surname. Notable people with the surname include:

== A ==
- Aaron Freeman (born 1956), American journalist, stand-up comedian, author, cartoonist, blogger
- Aaron Freeman (born 1970), musician and co-founder of the band Ween, better known as Gene Ween
- Aaron Freeman, American lawyer and politician from the state of Indiana
- Alan Freeman (1927–2006), Australian-born British DJ
- Alan A. Freeman (1920–1985), English record producer
- Alexandra Freeman, Baroness Freeman of Steventon, British science communicator and former television producer
- Algeania Freeman (born 1949), American academic administrator
- Antonio Freeman (born 1972), American football player

== B ==
- Ben Freeman (born 1980), British actor
- Brian Freeman, several people
- Bobby Freeman (politician) (1934–2016), Louisiana attorney and politician
- Buck Freeman (1871–1949), American baseball outfielder
- Buck Freeman (pitcher) (1896–1953), American baseball pitcher
- Bucky Freeman (1895–1987), American football and baseball coach
- Bud Freeman (1906–1991), American jazz musician, bandleader, and composer

== C ==
- Cassidy Freeman (born 1982), American actress
- Castle Freeman Jr. (born 1944), American author
- Cathy Freeman (born 1973), Australian Olympic athlete
- Charles Freeman (disambiguation)
- Chapman Freeman (1832–1904), US congressman from Pennsylvania
- Chico Freeman (born 1949), American jazz tenor saxophonist and trumpeter
- Christopher Freeman (1921–2010), English economist
- Cody Freeman (born 2001), American baseball player
- Crispin Freeman (born 1972), American voice actor

== D ==
- David Freeman (disambiguation)
- Daniel Freeman (1826–1908), American homesteader
- DeDreana Freeman, North Carolina politician
- Dennis L. Freeman (1939–2020), Iowa politician
- Denny Freeman (1944–2021), American Texas and electric blues guitarist
- Derek Freeman (1916–2001), New Zealander anthropologist
- Devonta Freeman (born 1992), American football player
- Don Freeman (1908–1978), children's book author
- Douglas Freeman (1916–2013), English cricketer
- Douglas Southall Freeman (1886–1953), American journalist

== E ==
- Ed Freeman (1927–2008), U.S. Army helicopter pilot and Medal of Honor recipient
- Edward Augustus Freeman (1823–1892), British historian
- Edward Monroe Freeman (1875–1954), American botanist
- Elisabeth Freeman (1876–1942), British-born American suffragist and civil rights activist
- Elizabeth Freeman (c. 1742–1829), Massachusetts slave who sued for and won her freedom
- Erika Freeman (born 1927) is an Austrian-born psychotherapist
- Emily Freeman (born 1980), British sprinter
- Emily Freeman (poet), Nottinghamshire-based poet and part-time English teacher
- Emma Freeman, Australian film director
- Emma B. Freeman (1880–1928), American photographer
- Eric Freeman (farmer) (1932–2023), English farmer
- Ernest Arthur Freeman (1900–1975), English surgeon

== F ==
- Frank Freeman (architect) (1861–1949), Canadian-American architect
- Frank N. Freeman (1880–1961), American educational psychologist
- Frankie Muse Freeman (1916–2018), American lawyer
- Franklin Freeman (born 1945), American lawyer and former associate justice of the North Carolina Supreme Court
- Freddie Freeman (born 1989), Canadian-American baseball first baseman
- Fredrick Thomas Freeman (born 1963), convicted of murder in Minnesota

== G ==
- Gary Freeman (disambiguation)
- George Freeman (disambiguation)
- Gillian Freeman (1929–2019), British writer
- Greg Freeman (American football), American football player

== H ==
- Habern W. Freeman (born 1941), American politician
- Hannah Freeman (1731–1802), Lenape indigenous healer and artisan
- Hans Freeman (1929–2008), German-born Australian protein crystallographer and chemist
- Harold Freeman, maker of pornographic films who was involved in the court case California v. Freeman
- Harold Webber Freeman (1899-1994), British novelist
- Harry Freeman (1906 – 1978), a 20th-Century American journalist, best known for serving in the New York bureau of TASS
- Harry Lawrence Freeman (1869–1954), American composer, conductor, impresario and teacher
- Hobart Freeman (1920–1984), Word of Faith preacher and author

== J ==
- James Freeman (disambiguation)
- Jay Freeman, developer of Cydia software
- Jean Freeman (1950–2010), American swimming coach
- Jeane Freeman (1953–2026), Scottish businesswoman and politician
- Jerrell Freeman (born 1986), American football player, linebacker for the Indianapolis Colts
- Jo Freeman (born 1945), American feminist and political scientist
- Joan Maie Freeman (1918–1998), Australian physicist
- Joanne B. Freeman (born 1962), U.S. historian
- John Freeman (disambiguation)
- Jon Freeman (academic), American psychologist and associate professor of psychology at Columbia University
- Jon Freeman (game designer), computer game industry figure
- Jonathan Freeman (representative) (1745–1808), United States congressman from New Hampshire
- Joseph Freeman (Mormon) (born 1952), Latter Day Saints bishop
- Joseph Freeman (politician) (1765–1839), Nova Scotia politician
- Joseph Freeman (writer) (1897–1965), American left-wing writer and editor
- Josh Freeman (born 1988), American football player, backup quarterback for the Minnesota Vikings
- Julia Wheelock Freeman (1833–1900), American Civil War nurse
- Julie Freeman (disambiguation)

== K ==
- Kathleen Freeman (classicist), (1897–1959), British classical scholar and novelist
- Kay Freeman, American actress, known for Summerspell
- Kenneth or Ken Freeman (disambiguation)
- Kevin Freeman (basketball) (born 1978), American basketball player and coach

== L ==
- Lennard Freeman (born 1995), American basketball player in the Israeli Basketball Premier League
- Lewis R. Freeman (1878–1960), American author
- Lizzie Freeman (born 1992), American voice actress.

== M ==
- Marcus Freeman (born 1986), American football coach and former player
- Mark Freeman (disambiguation)
- Martin Freeman (born 1971), English actor
- Martin Henry Freeman (1826–1889), first black president of an American college
- Mary Eleanor Wilkins Freeman, American author
- Matilda Freeman (born 2004), British actress
- Mavis Freeman (1918–1988), American swimmer
- Mavis Freeman (scientist) (1907–1992), Australian bacteriologist and biochemist
- Michael Freeman (chess player) (born 1960), New Zealand chess player
- Michael O. Freeman (born 1948), American attorney and politician
- Mona Freeman (1926–2014), American actress
- Morgan Freeman (born 1937), American actor and producer
- Morgan J. Freeman (born 1969), American film director
- Mylène Freeman (born 1989), Canadian Member of Parliament

== N ==
- Nathaniel Freeman (physician) (1741–1827), American physician and jurist
- Nathaniel Freeman Jr. (1766–1800), American congressman
- Nathaniel Freeman (Nova Scotia politician) (1740–1795), merchant and political figure in Nova Scotia

== O ==
- Orville Freeman (1918–2003), Governor of Minnesota and US Secretary of Agriculture
- Owen Freeman (born 2004), American basketball player

== P ==
- Paul Freeman (disambiguation)
- Peter Freeman (disambiguation)

== R ==
- Ralph Freeman (disambiguation)
- R. Austin Freeman (1862–1943), British writer of detective stories
- Richard Freeman (bridge) (1933–2009), American bridge player
- Richard Freeman (physician), British sports physician and doctor
- Richard B. Freeman (born 1943), American labor economist
- Robert Freeman (disambiguation)
- Robin Freeman (basketball) (1934–2014), two-time All-American guard at Ohio State University in the 1950s
- Robin Freeman (golfer) (born 1959), American professional golfer
- Roger Freeman (disambiguation)
- Royce Freeman (born 1996), American football player
- Russ Freeman (pianist) (1926–2002), American jazz pianist and composer
- Ruth Reynolds Freeman (1913–1969), American modernist architect in Vermont

== S ==
- Samuel Freeman (Canadian politician) (1824–1902), Canadian political figure
- Samuel Freeman (philosopher), American philosopher
- Samuel Freeman Miller (1816–1890), US Supreme Court justice
- Sarah Freeman (skier) (born 1992), Canadian skier
- Scott Freeman (economist) (1954–2004), American economist
- Scott Freeman (voice actor), American voice actor
- Séamus Freeman (1944–2022), Irish Roman Catholic prelate
- Sultaana Freeman, Muslim woman who sued for the right to wear a veil for her driver's license photo

== T ==
- Terrance Freeman, American politician
- Tich Freeman (Alfred Percy Freeman, 1888–1965), Kent cricketer
- Tommy Freeman (rugby union), English rugby union player
- Tracey Freeman, Australian Paralympic athlete
- Tyler Freeman (baseball) (born 1999), American baseball player
- Tyler Freeman (soccer) (born 2003), American soccer player

== V ==
- Von Freeman (1923–2012), American hard bop jazz tenor saxophonist

== W ==
- Walter Freeman (footballer) (1895–1972), English footballer
- Walter Jackson Freeman II (1895–1972), pioneer of psychosurgery
- Walter Jackson Freeman III (1927–2016), American biologist, theoretical neuroscientist and philosopher
- Wilfrid Freeman (1888–1953), British air marshal
- Woody Freeman (born 1946), Arkansas businessman and 1984 Republican gubernatorial nominee

== Y ==
- Y. Frank Freeman (1890–1969), American studio head at Paramount Pictures

== Fictional characters ==
- Amber Freeman, from the 2022 film Scream
- Atticus Freeman, the protagonist from the 2020 show Lovecraft Country
- Augustus Freeman IV, secret identity of DC comics superhero Icon
- Billy Freeman, from the novel Doctor Sleep
- Carol Freeman, captain of the U.S.S. Cerritos and a major character in the show Star Trek: Lower Decks
- Crying Freeman, the main character in the anime, manga and live-action movie of the same name
- Django Freeman, protagonist of the film Django Unchained
- Elijah Freeman, protagonist of the novel Elijah of Buxton
- Francis Freeman, from the 2016 film Deadpool
- Gordon Freeman, the silent protagonist of the Half-Life video game series
- Huey Freeman, one of the protagonists from the comic strip and TV Series The Boondocks
- Matt Freeman (Power of Five), from Anthony Horowitz's Power of Five series
- Nikki Freeman, from the 2025 film Obsession
- Riley Freeman, one of the protagonists from the comic strip and TV Series The Boondocks
- Robert Jebediah Freeman, one of the protagonists from the comic strip and TV Series The Boondocks
- Vincent Anton Freeman, protagonist of the film Gattaca
- Mr. Freeman, the main character of an animated web series

== See also ==
- General Freeman (disambiguation)
- Judge Freeman (disambiguation)
- Justice Freeman (disambiguation)
- Senator Freeman (disambiguation)
- Freeman Freeman-Thomas, 1st Marquess of Willingdon (1866–1941), Governor General of Canada and Viceroy of India
- Jonathan Freeman-Attwood, principal of the Royal Academy of Music in London
- Freeman (disambiguation)
- Friman (surname)
- Lester Freamon, (similarly spelled and pronounced) a police detective on the HBO drama The Wire
- Freedman/Friedman
- Fridman
