= Tennessee House of Representatives 56th district =

State legislative district in Tennessee

Tennessee's 56th State House of Representatives district
- Map of Tennessee House districts with the 56th District shaded in red
Representative
Bob Freeman; D–Nashville
- Demographics: 77.9% White; 6.5% Black; 5% Hispanic; 5.7% Asian; 0.3% Other; 4.4% Multiracial
- Population (2024): 78,196

The Tennessee House of Representatives 56th district is one of 99 legislative districts in the Tennessee House of Representatives. The district represents central Davidson County. It consists of West Nashville neighborhoods, including Richland, Cherokee Park, and Green Hills. It includes the campuses of Vanderbilt, Lipscomb, and Belmont Universities. It has been represented by Bob Freeman since 2013.

== Demographics ==
The Tennessee Comptroller estimates the population as of 2024 at 74,539. The district's median income is about 1.5x the Tennessee median, $102,609 to $69,595. The district's college education attainment is 77.8% compared to the Tennessee median of 31.1%.

- 77.9% of the district is White
- 6.5% of the district is African American
- 5.7% of the district is Asian
- 5% of the district is Hispanic
- 0.3% of the district is some other race
- 4.4% of the district is Two or more races

Detailed demographic information is also available through Census Reporter.

== List of representatives ==
Representative	Party	Years of service	General Assembly	Residence
Bob Freeman	Democratic	2019–present	111th-114th	Nashville
Beth Harwell	Republican	1989–2018	96th-110th	Nashville
Jan Bushing	Democratic	1987–1988	95th	Nashville
Stephen Cobb	Democratic	1975–1986	89th-94th	Nashville
Mary M. Anderson	Democratic	1973–1974	88th	Nashville

== Electoral history ==
=== 2024 ===
2024 Tennessee House of Representatives election, District 56
Party	Candidate	Votes	%
Democratic	Bob Freeman	25,690	100.00
Total votes		25,690	100.00

=== 2022 ===
2022 Tennessee House of Representatives election, District 56
Party	Candidate	Votes	%
Democratic	Bob Freeman	17,352	100.00
Total votes		17,352	100.00

=== 2020 ===
2020 Tennessee House of Representatives election, District 56
Party	Candidate	Votes	%
Democratic	Bob Freeman	22,321	54.16
Republican	Diane Michel Canada	18,891	45.84
Total votes		41,212	100.00

=== 2018 ===
2018 Tennessee House of Representatives election, District 56
Party	Candidate	Votes	%
Democratic	Bob Freeman	18,312	51.42
Republican	Brent Moody	17,300	48.58
Total votes		35,612	100.00

=== 2016 ===
2016 Tennessee House of Representatives election, District 56
Party	Candidate	Votes	%
Republican	Beth Harwell	21,069	58.05
Democratic	Chris Moth	15,224	41.95
Total votes		36,293	100.00

=== 2014 ===
2014 Tennessee House of Representatives election, District 56
Party	Candidate	Votes	%
Republican	Beth Harwell	21,069	63.30
Democratic	Chris Moth	8,601	36.70
Total votes		23,440	100.00

=== 2012 ===
2012 Tennessee House of Representatives election, District 56
Party	Candidate	Votes	%
Republican	Beth Harwell	24,912	100.00
Total votes		24,912	100.00

=== 2010 ===
2010 Tennessee House of Representatives election, District 56
Party	Candidate	Votes	%
Republican	Beth Harwell	18,831	67.53
Democratic	Matthew R. Kenigson	9,053	32.47
Total votes		27,884	100.00

=== 2008 ===
2008 Tennessee House of Representatives election, District 56
Party	Candidate	Votes	%
Republican	Beth Harwell	31,318	100.00
Total votes		31,318	100.00

=== 2006 ===
2006 Tennessee House of Representatives election, District 56
Party	Candidate	Votes	%
Republican	Beth Harwell	20,272	100.00
Total votes		20,272	100.00

=== 2004 ===
2006 Tennessee House of Representatives election, District 56
Party	Candidate	Votes	%
Republican	Beth Harwell	26,081	72.59
Democratic	Ron Veasey	9,848	27.42
Total votes		35,929	100.00

=== 2002 ===
2002 Tennessee House of Representatives election, District 56
Party	Candidate	Votes	%
Republican	Beth Harwell	17,424	66.89
Democratic	Shannon Wood	7,152	27.46
Independent	Thomas F. O'Connell	1,471	5.64
Total votes		26,047	100.00

=== 2000 ===
2000 Tennessee House of Representatives election, District 56
Party	Candidate	Votes	%
Republican	Beth Harwell	25,291	74.00
Democratic	Jack Hicks	7,759	22.70
Libertarian	Rich Husband	1,125	3.30
Total votes		34,175	100.00
