= Eric Freeman =

Eric Freeman may refer to:

- Eric Freeman (artist) (born 1970), artist based in New York
- Eric Freeman (cricketer) (1944–2020), Australian cricketer
- Eric Freeman (farmer) (1932–2023), English farmer
- Eric Freeman (writer), computer scientist and author
