= General Freeman =

General Freeman may refer to:

- Carl H. Freeman (born 1947), U.S. Army major general
- Nathaniel Freeman (physician) (1741–1827), Massachusetts Militia brigadier general in the American Revolutionary War
- Paul L. Freeman Jr. (1907–1988), U.S. Army four-star general

== See also ==
- Harold Freeman-Attwood (1897–1963), British Army major general
