= Robert Freeman =

Robert Freeman may refer to:

== Politicians ==
- Robert Freeman (MP for Bletchingley), Member of Parliament (MP) for Bletchingley
- Robert Freeman (MP for Southwark), MP for Southwark
- Robert Louis Freeman Sr. (1934–2016), Democratic lieutenant governor of the U.S. state of Louisiana, 1980–1988
- Robert L. Freeman (born 1956), Democratic member of the Pennsylvania House of Representatives
- Robert D. Freeman (1921–2001), former member of the Ohio Senate
- Bob Freeman (politician) (born 1975), member of the Tennessee House of Representatives

== Religion ==
- Robert Freeman (pastor) (1878–?), Scottish-American clergyman
- Robert C. Freeman, professor of Church History and Doctrine at Brigham Young University
- Robert Freeman (bishop) (born 1952), Church of England bishop of Penrith

== Music ==
- Bobby Freeman (1940–2017), African-American soul singer, songwriter, and record producer
- Robert Freeman (musician) (1935–2022), American pianist, music educator, and musicologist
- Rob Freeman (born 1981), former guitarist, backing vocalist and songwriter for Hidden in Plain View

== Others ==
- Robert Tanner Freeman (1846–1873), first African-American to graduate from the Harvard School of Dental Medicine
- Bob Freeman (fl. 1840s–1850s), janitor of Theophilus Freeman's slave pen
- Bobby Freeman (American football) (1932–2003), American football defensive back
- Robert Freeman (photographer) (1936–2019), photographer and designer
- Robert Freeman (born 1953), American financial industry arbitrageur, see Dennis Levine
- Robert Freeman, one of the main characters from The Boondocks franchise
- Robert M. Freeman, Goldman Sachs partner convicted of insider trading in 1989
- Bobby Freeman (writer), writer, journalist, television presenter and cook
- Robert T. Freeman, contemporary artist and member of the Boston Arts Commission

== See also ==
- Freeman (surname)
- Robert Freeman Hopwood (1856–1940), Republican member of the U.S. House of Representatives from Pennsylvania
- Robert Freeman Smith (1931–2020), member of the U.S. House of Representatives from Oregon
- Robert Freeman Wexler (born 1961), American writer of surreal fantasy
- Robert Freedman (disambiguation)
