= Carl Freeman =

Carl Freeman may refer to:

- Carl H. Freeman (born 1947), U.S. Army officer
- Carl M. Freeman (1910–1998), American real estate developer
