= Senator Freeman =

Senator Freeman may refer to:

- Aaron Freeman (politician) (fl. 2010s), Indiana State Senate
- Dewayne Freeman (born 1955), Alabama State Senate
- Glenn Freeman (1933–2014), Kentucky State Senate
- Habern W. Freeman (born 1941), Maryland State Senate
- Jonathan Freeman (representative) (1745–1808), New Hampshire State Senate
- Mary Lou Freeman (1941–2006), Iowa State Senate
- Michael O. Freeman (born 1948), Minnesota State Senate
- Robert D. Freeman (1921–2001), Ohio State Senate
