= Informant =

Person who provides information

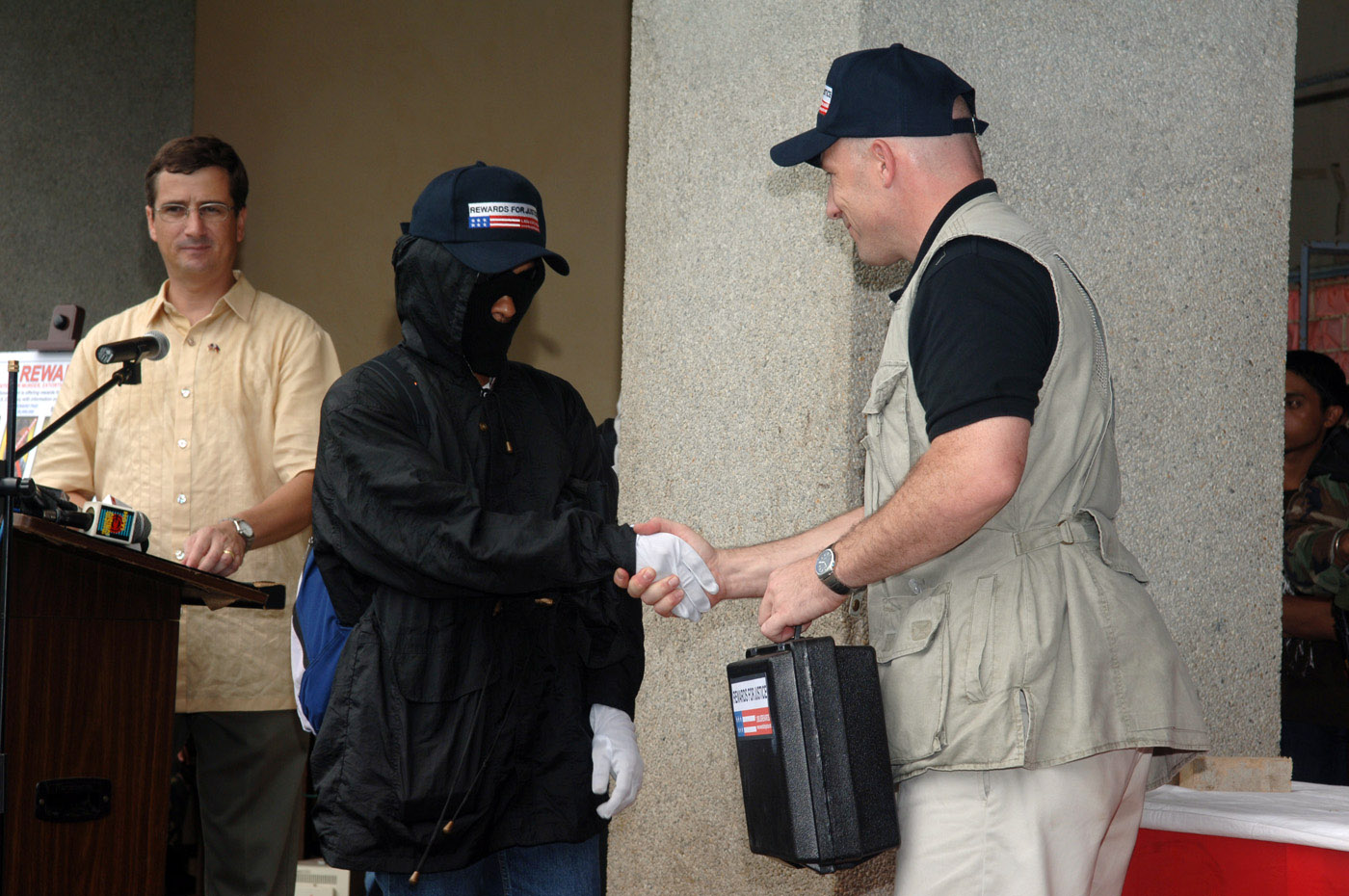
A representative from the U.S. State Department congratulates and offers a partial payment to a fully disguised informant whose information led to the neutralization of two terrorists in the Philippines

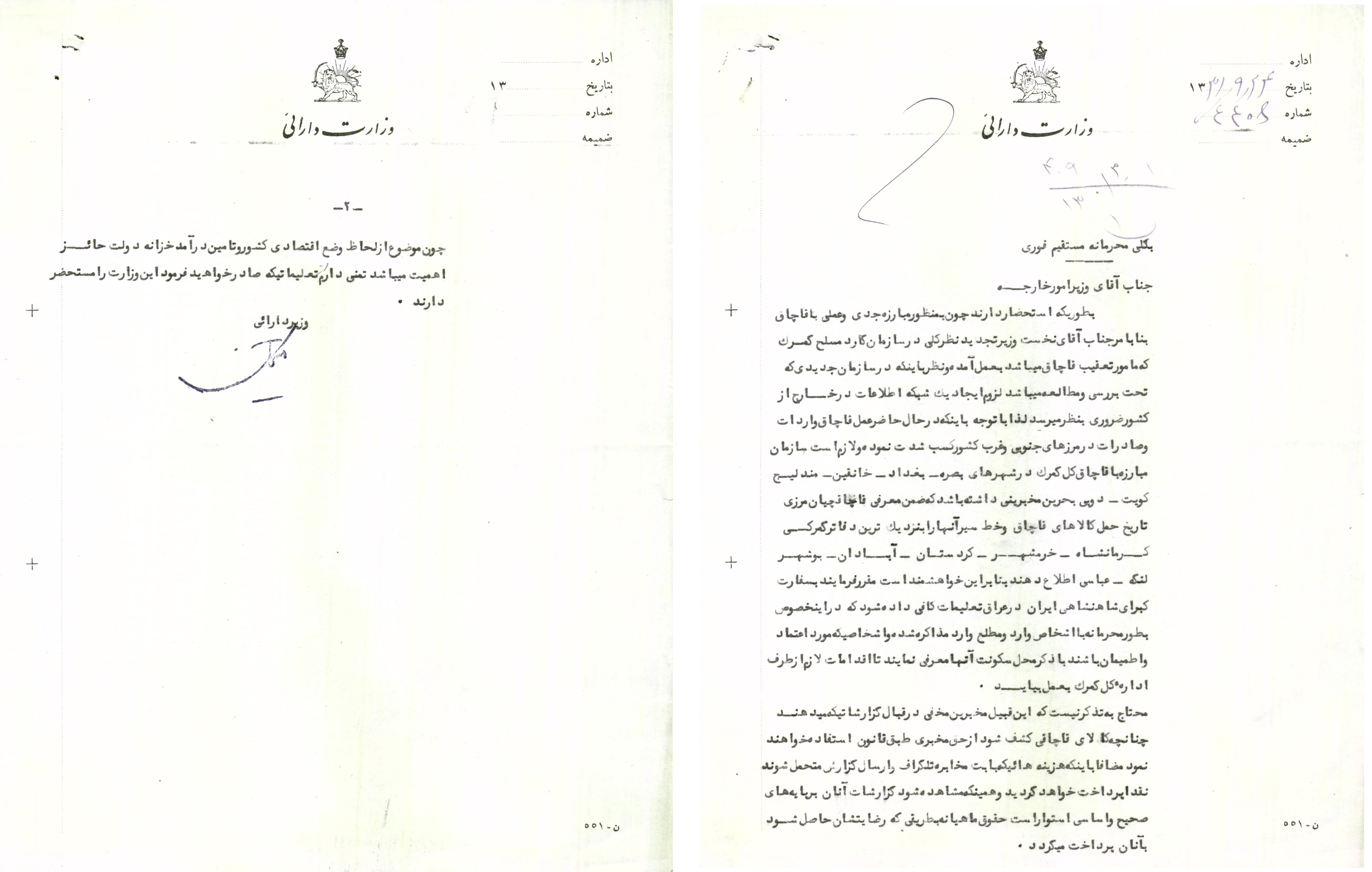
Two-page totally confidential, direct and immediate letter from the Iranian Minister of Finance to the Minister of Foreign Affairs (Hossein Fatemi) about creating a foreign information network for controlling smuggling, 15 December 1952

An informant is a person who provides privileged information, or (usually damaging) information intended to be intimate, concealed, or secret, about a person or organization to an agency, often a government or law enforcement agency. The term is usually used within the law-enforcement world, where informants are officially known as confidential human sources (CHS), or criminal informants (CI). It can also refer pejoratively to someone who supplies information without the consent of the involved parties. The term is commonly used in politics, industry, entertainment, and academia.

In the United States, a confidential informant or "CI" is "any individual who provides useful and credible information to a law enforcement agency regarding felonious criminal activities and from whom the agency expects or intends to obtain additional useful and credible information regarding such activities in the future".

== Terminology ==
They may also called an informer or, as a slang term, a "snitch", "rat", "canary", "stool pigeon", "stoolie", "tout" or "grass", among other terms.

== Criminal informants ==
Informants are extremely common in every-day police work, including homicide and narcotics investigations. Any citizen who provides crime-related information to law enforcement by definition is an informant.

Law enforcement and intelligence agencies may face criticism regarding their conduct towards informants. Informants may be shown leniency for their own crimes in exchange for information, or simply turn out to be dishonest in their information, resulting in the time and money spent acquiring them being wasted.

Informants are often regarded as traitors by their former criminal associates. Whatever the nature of a group, it is likely to feel strong hostility toward any known informers, regard them as threats and inflict punishments ranging from social ostracism through physical abuse and/or death. Informers are therefore generally protected, either by being segregated while in prison or, if they are not incarcerated, relocated under a new identity.

=== Motivation ===
FBI Anchorage aid for assessing confidential human sources

Informants, and especially criminal informants, can be motivated by many reasons. Many informants are not themselves aware of all of their reasons for providing information, but nonetheless do so. Many informants provide information while under stress, duress, emotion and other life factors that can affect the accuracy or veracity of information provided.

Law enforcement officers, prosecutors, defense lawyers, judges and others should be aware of possible motivations so that they can properly approach, assess and verify informants' information.

Generally, informants' motivations can be broken down into self-interest, self-preservation and conscience.

A list of possible motivations includes:

- Self-interest:
  - Financial reward.
  - Pre-trial release from custody.
  - Withdrawal or dismissal of criminal charges.
  - Reduction of sentence.
  - Choice of location to serve sentence.
  - Elimination of rivals or unwanted criminal associates.
  - Elimination of competitors engaged in criminal activities.
  - Diversion of suspicion from their own criminal activities.
  - Revenge.
  - Desire to become a spy.
- Self-preservation:
  - Fear of harm from others.
  - Threat of arrest or charges.
  - Threat of incarceration.
  - Desire for witness protection program.
- Conscience:
  - Desire to leave criminal past.
  - Guilty conscience.
  - Redemption.
  - Mutual respect.
  - Genuine desire to assist law enforcement and society.

== Labor and social movements ==
Corporations and the detective agencies that sometimes represent them have historically hired labor spies to monitor or control labor organizations and their activities. Such individuals may be professionals or recruits from the workforce. They may be willing accomplices, or may be tricked into informing on their co-workers' unionization efforts.

== Politics ==
A redacted version of the FBI policy manual concerning the use of informants

Informers alert authorities regarding government officials that are corrupt. Officials may be taking bribes or be participants in a money loop also called a kickback. Informers in some countries receive a percentage of all money recovered by their government.

The ancient Roman historian Lactantius described a judiciary case which involved the prosecution of a woman suspected to have advised another woman not to marry Maximinus II: "Neither indeed was there any accuser, until a certain Jew, one charged with other offences, was induced, through hope of pardon, to give false evidence against the innocent. The equitable and vigilant magistrate conducted him out of the city under a guard, lest the populace should have stoned him... The Jew was ordered to the torture till he should speak as he had been instructed... The innocent were condemned to die.... Nor was the promise of pardon made good to the feigned adulterer, for he was fixed to a gibbet, and then he disclosed the whole secret contrivance; and with his last breath he protested to all the beholders that the women died innocent."

Criminal informant schemes have been used as cover for politically motivated intelligence offensives.

== False testimony ==
Jailhouse informants, who report hearsay (admissions against penal interest) which they claim to have heard while the accused is in pretrial detention, usually in exchange for sentence reductions or other inducements, have been the focus of particular controversy. Some examples of their use are in connection with Stanley Williams, Cameron Todd Willingham, Thomas Silverstein, Marshall "Eddie" Conway, Temujin Kensu and a suspect in the disappearance of Etan Patz. The Innocence Project has stated that 15% of all wrongful convictions later exonerated because of DNA results were accompanied by false testimony by jailhouse informants. 50% of murder convictions exonerated by DNA were accompanied by false testimony by jailhouse informants.

== Entrapment ==
Payments to informants can incentivize crime which would not have happened without the payments and can result in entrapment. Paid informants and agent provocateurs have often been used to weaken, destabilize and ultimately break movements.

== Slang ==
Slang terms for informants include:

- blabbermouth
- cheese eater
- canary – derives from the fact that canaries sing, and "singing" is underworld or street slang for providing information or talking to the police.
- dry snitch - dry snitching is to indirectly snitch on someone
- dog – Australian term. May also refer to police forces who specialize in surveillance, or police generally.
- ear – someone who overhears something and tells the authorities.
- fink – this may refer to the Pinkertons who were used as plain-clothes detectives and strike-breakers.
- grass or supergrass – rhyming slang for "grasshopper", meaning "copper" or "shopper", having additional associations with the popular song Whispering Grass and the phrase "snake in the grass".
- narc – a member of a specialist anti-narcotic law enforcement agency or police intelligence force.
- nark – this may have come from the Romani term nak for "nose" or the French term narquois, which means "cunning", "deceitful", and/or "criminal".
- nose
- pentito – Italian term meaning "one who repents". Originally and most frequently used in reference to Mafia informants, it has also been used to refer to informants for Italian paramilitary and terrorist organizations (such as the Red Brigades and Front Line), and people who delivered confidential informations to the authorities during the "Maxi Trial" and "Mani pulite" nationwide judiciary investigations.
- pursuivant (archaic)
- rat – informing is commonly referred to as "ratting" in American English.
- snitch – informing is commonly referred to as "snitching", term originally used within the African-American community and more recently associated with hip hop music, hardcore rap, and trap, alongside their derivative subgenres and subcultures.
- snout
- spotter
- squealer
- stikker – Danish term meaning "stabber", mainly used in relation to World War II. During and after the Nazi occupation of Denmark (1940–1945), the word has been used specifically to indicate the Danish whistleblowers, agents, and spies which informed the German secret police, the Gestapo, in order to undermine the Danish resistance movement.
- stool pigeon or stoolie
- tell tale or tell-tale
- tattletale
- tittle-tattle
- tout – Northern Irish term for an informant, often one who informed on the activities of Irish paramilitary organizations during "the Troubles".
- trick
- turncoat
- weasel
- X9 - A slang term in Brazil, possibly inspired by the comic strip Secret Agent X-9.

The term "stool pigeon" originates from the antiquated practice of tying a passenger pigeon to a stool. The bird would flap its wings in a futile attempt to escape. The sound of the wings flapping would attract other pigeons to the stool where a large number of birds could be easily killed or captured.

== List of notable individuals ==
- Tim Allen, actor, who was arrested with cocaine and provided the names of other dealers in exchange for a sentence of three to seven years rather than a possible life imprisonment
- Nicky Barnes, head of The Council, which he would later testify against
- Whitey Bulger, Boston Irish mob boss
- Nicholas Calabrese, a made man who testified against the Chicago Outfit
- James Carey, Irish terrorist
- Stephen Flemmi, Whitey Bulger's partner-in-crime
- Flores twins Pedro and Margarito
- Nicola Gobbo, former Australian barrister who provided information on her own clients
- Sammy Gravano, former underboss of the Gambino crime family
- Daniel Hernandez a.k.a. Tekashi 6ix9ine, American rapper, who testified against Nine Trey Gangsters
- Henry Hill, Lucchese crime family associate
- Frank Lucas, New York City drug dealer turned informant
- Joseph Massino, the first boss of one of the Five Families in New York City to turn state's evidence
- George Orwell, author of Orwell's list
- Abe Reles, Murder, Inc. hit man
- Freddie Scappaticci, member of the Provisional IRA
- Joseph Valachi, soldier of the Genovese crime family
- Salvatore Vitale, former underboss of the Bonanno crime family
- Richard Wershe Jr. (commonly known as "White Boy Rick"), the youngest FBI informant ever at age 14

== By country ==
=== Russia and Soviet Union ===
A system of informants existed in the Russian Empire and was later adopted by the Soviet Union. In Russia, such people were known as osvedomitel or donoschik, and secretly cooperated with law enforcement agencies, such as the secret-police force Okhrana and later the Soviet militsiya or KGB. Officially, those informants were referred to as "secret coworker" (Russian: секретный сотрудник, sekretny sotrudnik) and often were referred by the Russian-derived portmanteau seksot. In some KGB documents has also been used the designation "source of operational information" (Russian: источник оперативной информации, istochnik operativnoi informatsii).

== See also ==
- Aguilar–Spinelli test
- Counter-terrorism
- Covert interrogation
- Denunciation
- Espionage
- Hollywood blacklist
- Pentiti
- Plea bargain
- Turn state's evidence
- United States Marshals Service
- Watergate scandal
- Whistleblower
- Witness Protection Program
