= Ralph Freman =

Ralph Freman may refer to:

- Ralph Freman (1627–1714), Member of Parliament for Hertfordshire 1685–7 and 1690–5
- Ralph Freman (1666–1742), his son, MP for Hertfordshire 1697–1727

== See also ==
- Ralph Freeman (disambiguation)
