= Friman =

Friman is a surname that may refer to:

- Alice Friman (born 1933), American poet
- Anna Maria Friman (born 1972), Swedish singer
- Jaakko Friman (1904–1987), Finnish speed skater
- Leo Friman (born 1951), Finnish musician known by his stage name Freeman
- Niklas Friman (born 1993), Finnish ice hockey player
- Oskari Friman (1893–1933), Finnish wrestler
- Ville Friman (born 1980), Finnish musician

== See also ==
- Freeman (disambiguation)
- Freeman (surname)
- Frimann
