= Mark Freeman =

Mark Freeman may refer to:

- Mark Freeman (artist), American painter
- Mark Freeman (baseball), American baseball player (1930–2006)
- Mark Freeman (basketball), American basketball player
- Mark Freeman (bishop), Australian Catholic bishop
- Mark Freeman (politician), American politician from Arizona

== See also ==
- Mark Freedman, American tennis player
- Mark Friedman, Canadian ice hockey player
