= Frimann =

Frimann is a masculine given name. It is the Icelandic and Nordic version of Friedemann.

Notable people with the name include:

- Vilhelm Frimann Koren Bjerknes (1862–1951), Norwegian physicist and meteorologist
- Vilhelm Frimann Christie Bøgh (1817–1888), Norwegian archivist
- Wilhelm Frimann Koren Christie (1778–1849), Norwegian constitutional father
- Wilhelm Frimann Koren Christie (Nazi) (1885–1956), Norwegian jurist and Nazi collaborator
- P. H. Frimann (1752–1839), Norwegian-Danish poet
- Per Frimann (born 1962), Danish former football player
- Kristofer Frimann Hjeltnes (1856–1930), Norwegian horticulturist and politician
- Jakob Frimann Magnusson (born 1953), Icelandic composer, keyboard player, film director and producer
- Christopher Frimann Omsen (1761–1829), Norwegian "Founding Father" and later Supreme Court Justice

== See also ==
- Freimann (disambiguation)
- Friedemann
- Friman
