= Roger Freeman =

Roger Freeman may refer to:

- Roger Freeman, Baron Freeman (1942–2025), British Conservative politician
- Roger Freeman (co-driver) (1951–2003), British rally car driver
- Roger A. Freeman (1928–2005), British military historian
- Roger A. Freeman (economist) (1904–1991), American economist
- Roger Freeman (politician) (1965–2014), an American politician
- Matt Freeman (born 1966), American bass guitarist and singer, birth name Roger Matthew Freeman
- Roger Freeman, member of the 1980s band Pigbag
