= Robert Freedman =

Robert Freedman may refer to:

- Robert Freedman (political scientist)
- Robert L. Freedman, American screenwriter, playwright, and lyricist
- Robert Freedman (tennis)

== See also ==
- Robert Freeman (disambiguation)
