= First Story =

First Story is an English charity that encourages children and young people to write creatively, outside the curriculum, for self-expression and pleasure. Its aim is to empower children and young people from low-income communities to find and develop their voices and, in doing so, thrive in education and beyond. The charity works in state secondary schools serving low-income communities and its operating regions are Greater London, the East Midlands and the North of England.

First Story's Young Writers Programme places professional authors into schools, where they work with a consistent cohort of children and young people, to develop confidence, creativity and writing ability. The programme ends with the publication of an anthology of students' writing, edited by their writer in residence. First Story produces over 60 new publications a year. The charity also runs creative writing competitions and events for programme participants. In 2021/22, as part of the Rathbones Folio Prize Mentorships, Emily Freeman was placed under the mentorship of the poet Fiona Benson.

The charity's Chief Executive is Sophie Hiscock. Its patron is Camilla, Duchess of Cornwall.

In the 2018–19 academic year, First Story worked in 73 schools across England and 1,565 students (aged 11–16) completed its intensive writer-in-residence programme.

== History ==
First Story was founded in London in 2008 by a former Teach First teacher, Katie Waldegrave, and a professional writer, William Fiennes, to provide young people in state education with extra-curricular support to develop their confidence, creativity and writing ability. Fiennes and Waldegrave met in 2007, when she was a history teacher at Cranford Community College in west London, and he was writer-in-residence at the fee-paying American School in London. They developed a plan to bring Fiennes' creative writing expertise into Waldegrave's less well-resourced state school. Based on the success of this pilot project, a year later the pair founded First Story.

The organisation's registered charitable objectives are:

1. To advance the education of students in secondary schools in low-income communities by providing facilities for education in creative writing that aren’t required to be provided by the local education authority.
2. To help young people advance in life by providing support, opportunities and activities which foster their creativity, literacy and talent, in order to build self-confidence, skills and aspiration so they may grow to full maturity as individuals and members of society.
3. To promote the arts and, in particular, literature, poetry and creative writing, by inviting, commissioning and maintaining the services of British writers (whether such services require payment or otherwise), and by encouraging and assisting in the promotion, advancement and publication of the works of British writers.

As First Story's first executive director, Katie Waldegrave oversaw the charity's growth from one school to more than 50 participating schools nationally. She stepped-down from day-to-day running of the organisation in 2014. The organisation still adheres to Fiennes' philosophy and creative writing pedagogy and is still involved in the organisation.
