= Patricia Miller (Indiana politician) =

American politician (born 1936)

Member of the Indiana Senate from the 32nd district
- In office September 26, 1983 – November 9, 2016
- Preceded by: Charles Edward Bosma
- Succeeded by: Aaron Freeman

Member of the Indiana House of Representatives from the 50th district
- In office November 3, 1982 – September 27, 1983
- Preceded by: Darrell Edward Felling
- Succeeded by: Jack L. Cottey

Personal details
- Born: July 4, 1936 (age 90)
- Party: Republican
- Spouse: Kenneth
- Education: Indiana University

Patricia L. Miller (born July 4, 1936) was a Republican member of the Indiana Senate, representing the 32nd District from 1983 to 2016. She served as the Chairman of Senate Committee on Health and Provider Services. Miller was a member of the Indiana House of Representatives from 1982 to 1983. She currently serves as the executive director for the Confessing Movement within the United Methodist Church.

== Early life and education ==
Miller graduated from received Methodist Hospital School for Nursing as a Registered Nurse and Indiana University with a Bachelor of Science.
