= Judge Freeman =

Judge Freeman may refer to:

- Arianna J. Freeman (born 1978), judge of the United States Court of Appeals for the Third Circuit
- Beth Labson Freeman (born 1953), judge of the United States District Court for the Northern District of California
- Ralph M. Freeman (1902–1990), judge of the United States District Court for the Eastern District of Michigan
- Richard Cameron Freeman (1926–1999), judge of the United States District Court for the Northern District of Georgia

== See also ==
- Justice Freeman (disambiguation)
