= Charles Freeman =

Charles Freeman may refer to:

- Charles Freeman (American Giant) (1821–1845)
- Charles Freeman (historian), English author and historian
- Charles E. Freeman (1933–2020), American jurist
- Charles F. Freeman (1832–1915), American businessman and politician
- Charles L. Freeman (1908–2001), American film and sound editor
- Charles W. Freeman Jr. (born 1943), American diplomat
- Charlie Freeman (1887–1956), English footballer
