= Bob Freeman (politician) =

American politician (born 1975)

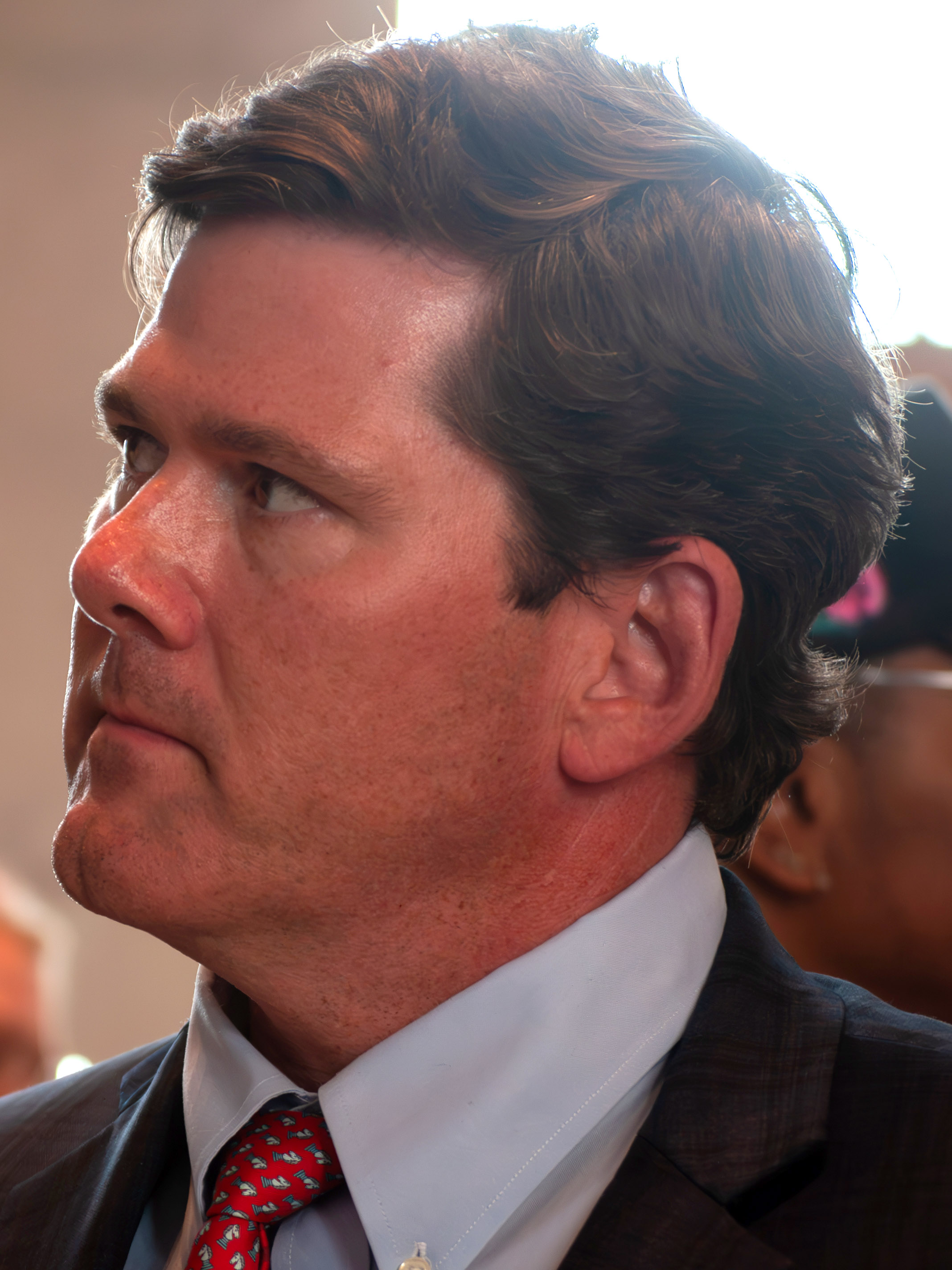
- Freeman in 2023

Member of the Tennessee House of Representatives from the 56th district
- Incumbent
- Assumed office January 8, 2019
- Preceded by: Beth Harwell

Personal details
- Born: July 3, 1975 (age 51)
- Party: Democratic
- Children: 3
- Education: Middle Tennessee State University (BS)); Lipscomb University (MS)
- Website: House website

Bob Freeman (born July 3, 1975) is a Democratic member of the Tennessee House of Representatives. He has represented the 56th district, encompassing parts of Davidson County, since 2019.

== Early life and career ==
Bob Freeman was born on July 3, 1975, as the oldest of three children to Bill Freeman. His father was a businessman, Democratic donor, and candidate in the 2015 Nashville mayoral election.

Freeman earned his BS from Middle Tennessee State University and his MS from Lipscomb University.

He served as vice president for real estate investment and development with the Forestar Group, Inc. before he co-founded the energy consulting and sustainable construction firm Freeman Applegate Partners in 2013.

== Tennessee House of Representatives ==
=== Elections ===
Freeman reported his decision to run for the house seat for the 56th district after the incumbent Republican Beth Harwell announced that she would seek the GOP nomination for the 2018 Tennessee gubernatorial election. He began his campaign as the only Democratic candidate for the seat in November, 2017, competing for the affluent Nashville district with the dermatologist Dr. Brent Moody, who won the Republican primaries against the lawyer Joseph Williams with 55.5 percent of the vote. During his campaign, Freeman cited education, traffic congestion, infrastructure, and the opioid crises as the state's primary concerns, and stressed the necessity of bipartisanship in his public appearances. Freeman won the race for the 56th district with 51.4 percent of the vote; his seat became one of two that Democrats flipped in the 2018 elections.

=== Tenure ===
As a member of the 111th General Assembly, Freeman is serving on the following committees:

- Committee of Consumer and Human Resources;
- the Employee Affairs Subcommittee;
- the Health Committee;
- the Facilities, Licensure, and Regulations Subcommittee;
- the Elect Ethics Committee;
- and the Workplace Discrimination and Harassment Subcommittee.

He has sponsored or co-sponsored fourteen bills, and voted in favor of policies to increase funding for dual enrollment programs, extend vocational training to the middle school level, and reinforce accountability of charter schools. In addition to his political functions, Freeman is also involved in the following community organizations:

- TN Environmental Council, a private environmental conservation advocacy and umbrella organization, board member;
- Southern Alliance for Clean Energy, board member;
- U.S. Green Building Council's Market Leadership Advisory Boards, a private, non-profit sustainable construction activist organization, board member;
- Nashville Homeless Commission, member;
- Tennessee Wildlife Federation, a non-profit wildlife conservation agency that also monitors and recommends conservation policies, former board member.

== Personal life ==
Freeman is married, has three children, and is a Presbyterian.
