= Gary Freeman =

Gary Freeman may refer to:

- Gary Freeman (basketball) (born 1948), NBA player in 1970
- Gary Freeman (illustrator) (born 1951), American sci-fi & fantasy artist
- Gary Freeman (rugby league) (born 1962), New Zealand rugby league player
- Gary Freeman (sculptor) (1937–2014), sculptor from Indianapolis, Indiana
