= Ralph Freeman =

Ralph Freeman may refer to:

- Ralph Freeman (MP for Northampton) (by 1509-58/59), English MP for Northampton (UK Parliament constituency)
- Ralph Freeman (MP for Winchelsea) (1589–1667), English MP for Winchelsea (UK Parliament constituency)
- Ralph Freeman (lawyer) (fl. 1610–1655), English civil lawyer, dramatist and translator
- Ralph Freeman (Lord Mayor) (died 1634), English merchant who was Lord Mayor of London in 1633
- Ralph Freeman (civil engineer, born 1880) (1880–1950), undertook design work for the Sydney Harbour Bridge and founder of Freeman, Fox & Partners
- Ralph Freeman (civil engineer, born 1911) (1911–1998), son of the above, designer of the Humber Suspension Bridge
- Ralph M. Freeman (1902–1990), American judge

== See also ==
- Ralph Freman (disambiguation)
- Ralph Friedman (1916–1995), American author
- Ralph Friedman (1903/4–1992), Chairman of the American Jewish Committee
