= Robert T. Freeman =

American painter and educator

Robert Freeman
- Born: Robert Turner Freeman; 1946; Brooklyn, NY, U.S.
- Education: Bachelor of Fine Arts, Boston University; Master of Fine Arts, Boston University
- Known for: Painting
- Notable work: Black Tie; Mardi Gras Indians

Robert Freeman (born 1946) is an American painter and educator known for his large-scale, figurative oil paintings titled Black Tie, offering commentary on the personal conflict Freeman felt as African-Americans settled into middle-class life following the racial tensions of the 1960s and 1970s. In 1997, Freeman was awarded the Boston University Distinguished Alumni Award from the School of Visual Arts and in 2020, Freeman was named the newest member of the Boston Arts Commission.

== Life and career ==
Freeman was born in Brooklyn, New York and spent much of his youth between Accra, Ghana and the United States. He attended two years at Howard University to study art under Lois Jones before transferring to Boston University’s School of Visual Arts, where he earned his B.F.A. in 1971 and M.F.A in 1981.

Freeman began his career as the Art Director for the Weston Public Schools from 1973 to 1981. In 1981 he became Artist in Residence at the Noble and Greenough School in Dedham, MA where he remained for 27 years. From 1988 to 1994 he taught drawing and painting at Harvard University.

Known for his trademarks, the use of contrasting color, movement and nearly abstract figures, Freeman's paintings depict African American subjects, and are inspired by his childhood experiences in Ghana and Washington, D.C. In his 1981 series, Black Tie, Freeman explored and celebrated "the beauty, elegance and grace of the black middle class" through his personal experience. A selection from Black Tie was on display in the 5th floor Mayor's Gallery at Boston City Hall.

In the article, "Invite only: Robert Freeman’s paintings dissect a social world” by Celina Colby in The Bay State Banner, Freeman's New Works is described as a series of oil paintings with the movement and power of a jazz concert. Despite the lighthearted activities shown, the paintings have a darker edge to them. “I think inclusiveness in our society is still in question,” Freeman says in the article. “We still live in a very segregated world”.

Mardi Gras Indians, a joint series in 2018 with photographer Max Stern, broke new ground for Freeman with the use of gold leaf and feathers to capture the elaborate costumes worn by Mardi Gras Indians as they celebrated mid-parade.

Currently, Freeman lives in Jamaica Plain, MA and works out of his studio in Waltham, MA.

== Awards and exhibitions ==
In 2008, Freeman's paintings were exhibited in the Five American Voices exhibit among the works of Romare Bearden, Benny Andrews, Alma Woodsey Thomas, and Richard Yarde at the Meridian International Center in Washington, D.C.

Black Tie, now part of the Museum of Fine Arts, Boston’s permanent collection, is among the numerous works of art that Freeman has shown nationally for over 40 years. Some of his paintings can be found in the collections at the National Center for African American Artists, Boston Public Library, DeCordova Museum, and Brown University among other institutions.

In addition to numerous gallery shows, Freeman's paintings have been featured in exhibitions at Rose Art Museum at Brandeis University, Museum of Fine Arts, Boston, and Williams College Museum of Art, Williamstown, MA.

In 1997, Freeman was awarded the Boston University Distinguished Alumni Award from the School of Visual Arts. Most recently, in 2020, Freeman was named the newest member of the Boston Arts Commission, where he will lend his vision for the display of public art across the city of Boston.

== Books ==
- Stokes Sims, Lowery. CommonWealth: Art by African Americans in the Museum of Fine Arts, Boston. Boston: MFA Publications, 2015. Print.
- Perruso, Alison. Who’s Who in American Art, Marquis Who's Who, 2010. Print.
- Riggs, Thomas. St. James Guide to Black Artists, Detroit: Schomburg Center for Research in Black Culture and St. James Press, 1997. Print.
