= Beth Harwell =

American politician (born 1957)

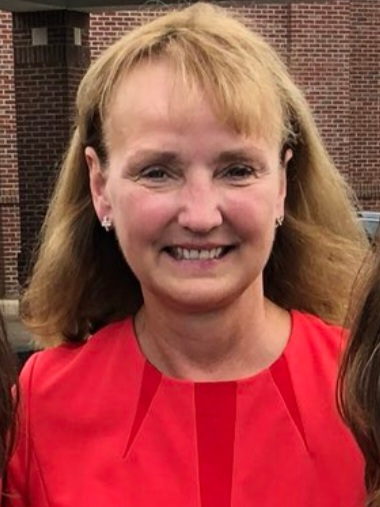
- Harwell in 2018

81st Speaker of the Tennessee House of Representatives
- In office January 11, 2011 – January 8, 2019
- Preceded by: Kent Williams
- Succeeded by: Glen Casada

Member of the Tennessee House of Representatives from the 56th district
- In office January 10, 1989 – January 8, 2019
- Preceded by: Jan Bushing
- Succeeded by: Bob Freeman

Chairwoman of the Tennessee Republican Party
- In office 2001–2004
- Preceded by: Chip Saltsman
- Succeeded by: Bob Davis

Personal details
- Born: July 24, 1957 (age 69) Norristown, Pennsylvania, U.S.
- Party: Republican
- Spouse: Samuel Harwell
- Children: 3
- Education: Lipscomb University (BA); Vanderbilt University (MS, PhD)

Beth Halteman Harwell (born July 24, 1957, in Norristown, Pennsylvania) was a member of the board of directors of the Tennessee Valley Authority and the former Speaker of the Tennessee House of Representatives. She served as State Representative for Nashville and is a former chair of the Tennessee Republican Party. First elected to the Tennessee House of Representatives in 1988, Harwell served as a Republican Minority Whip and Commerce Committee chair before being elected to the Speakership. She is the first woman to serve as Tennessee's Speaker of the House. In 2017, she announced her candidacy for governor of Tennessee in the 2018 election.

== College and early career ==
In 1978 Harwell received her Bachelor of Arts from Lipscomb University. She received a Ph.D. from Vanderbilt University. She is married to Samuel Harwell. The couple has three children.

Harwell received the Small Business award from the National Federation of Independent Business. Her husband Sam Harwell is the founder of Big Time Toys, LLC.

== Political career ==
Harwell ran for office for the first time while she was teaching at Belmont University, running for the 56th District in the Tennessee House of Representatives in 1986. While she lost that race, she ran again in 1988 and won. She has been representing her district ever since.

Harwell explored a run for the 2006 U.S. Senate race; however she decided against seeking that seat. In May 2007 Harwell said that she was considering running in the 2010 state gubernatorial election.

In the 2008 presidential election, Harwell was the state co-chair for John McCain's presidential campaign. McCain won 56.9% of Tennessee's popular vote against Democrat Barack Obama. During the elections, the Republican Party gained control of both the Tennessee Senate and House for the first time since Reconstruction. In January 2009, Harwell was named chairwoman of the Commerce Committee. Following the 2010 elections, Harwell was elected in 2011 by her colleagues in the Tennessee House to serve as Speaker of the Tennessee House of Representatives, the first woman to be elected to that office.

== Tennessee House of Representatives ==
Harwell's main focuses have been welfare reform, children's issues, sex abuse laws, victims' rights, and education.

Sex abuse laws/victims' rights

Harwell's legislative record includes passing legislation "clarifying and toughening the penalties against stalkers". She has also secured the passage of laws increasing the jail time for rapists, and "strengthening" laws for child rape.

Children's issues

Harwell sponsored the "Children's Act for Clean Indoor Air", protecting kids from the effects of second-hand smoking.

Welfare reform

Harwell was the sponsor of the "Families First" legislation which reformed Tennessee's welfare program into what it is today.

Anti-corruption

In the wake of the FBI's Operation Tennessee Waltz investigation, Harwell introduced legislation increasing the punishment for bribing public servants or for public servants who accept bribes.

Campaign finance reform

During the 104th General Assembly (2005-2006), Harwell introduced legislation in the Tennessee House to impose limits to how much candidates for governor and the General Assembly could spend. In the 105th General Assembly (2007-2008), Harwell introduced legislation to ban donations to and campaigning for candidates for General Assembly from the Secretary of State, Comptroller of the Treasury, and State Treasurer, as the General Assembly elects those offices.

Education

In 2009, Harwell led the push for landmark charter school legislation, allowing more Tennessee students to enroll in charter schools. Additionally, she secured the passage of legislation that directed more funds to improve the training of day care workers.

Crime

Harwell sponsored legislation requiring someone subject to an order to protection to give up any firearms that person owns and establishing a punishment for those subject to an order of protection found to be in possession of a firearm.

Harwell has served as Speaker of the Tennessee House of Representatives since the 107th General Assembly (2011-2012).

Honors

During her time in the State House, Harwell has been given many awards, including the following:

- Tennessee Chamber of Commerce 'Champion of Commerce' Award
- Harold Bradley Legislative Leadership Award
- American Cancer Society Legislative Leadership Award
- Champion for Children Award
- National Federation of Independent Business's Guardian of Small Business Award (twice)

== Community involvement ==
Harwell currently serves or has previously served as a member of the following:

- Tennessee State Museum Foundation
- Lipscomb University Advisory Council
- Montgomery Bell Academy Board
- National Foundation for Women Legislators
- Mental Health Association of Middle Tennessee
- Nashville Children's Theater Board of Trustees
- Leadership Nashville (alumni)

Harwell has previously served on:

- Agape Board of Directors
- American Heart Association
- Exchange Club Family Center
- Centennial Medical Center Board of Directors
- Senior Citizens Board of Directors
- Middle Tennessee Mental Health Center

== Gubernatorial campaign ==
Harwell speaking at a gubernatorial forum in Chattanooga, June 2018

In July 2017, Harwell announced that she was running for Governor of Tennessee in the 2018 election. On August 2, 2018, she lost the Republican primary.

Harwell's platform for the election was as follows:

Support for President Trump

Harwell was the first major state legislator to give public support to then-candidate Donald Trump during his bid for the presidency. Following the Tennessee primaries, Harwell said she would support Trump should he become the GOP nominee. She said that she would continue her support for the Trump Administration as governor.

Opioid crisis

Harwell supports tougher sentencing for dealers, more restrictions on prescriptions, and prioritizing rehab over prison sentences. As Speaker, Harwell created a task force in 2017 to hear from experts and those affected by the crisis. Among the task force's recommendations are adding more TBI agents, starting a pilot program of a recovery center in each grand division of the state, and modernizing pain-management curriculum for healthcare professionals.

Medical marijuana

Harwell supports legalizing medical cannabis in Tennessee. During the 2018 session of the Tennessee General Assembly, Speaker Harwell cast the tie-breaking vote in the House Criminal Justice Subcommittee to advance legislation legalizing medical cannabis. During a GOP candidate debate, Harwell stated that she believed it would be "cruel to withhold that from someone who needs that help". Each of the other candidates said they opposed such legislation, making Harwell the only GOP candidate to support legalizing medical cannabis. On July 20, Harwell held a press conference in the State Capitol Building reinforcing her support of medical cannabis and debuting a new ad touting her support for it. In the press conference, Harwell stated that to her, the issue is a "dignity of life" issue.

Immigration

Harwell is a strong opponent of sanctuary cities in Tennessee, helping to pass a law in 2017 which banned sanctuary cities in the state. The law was passed during a debate in Middle Tennessee over a proposed ordinance in the Nashville Metro City Council which would have made the city a sanctuary city.

Education

Harwell was the only educator in the race for governor, and education was one of her top priorities. As speaker, Harwell supported the efforts to end Common Core in Tennessee and to allow for charter schools, and was a leader in the fight for more investment in education. Tennessee is now one of the fastest-improving states in education. Harwell has advocated for a renewed focus on literacy in lower grades and more emphasis on how valuable technical school can be compared to college.

TN Ready testing

Following 2018 TN Ready testing period, Speaker Harwell led the push to ensure that the state's teachers were not hurt by the botched testing and to investigate what went wrong. Harwell directed the House Government Operations Committee to hold additional hearings on the issue, and asked the State Comptroller of the Treasury to review the testing vendor, Questar.

The Tennessee Education Association has endorsed Harwell in the Republican primary, citing her experience as an educator, her knowledge on education issues facing the state, and her efforts to raise teachers' salaries in the state.

Budget

Harwell ensured that Tennessee's budget was balanced every year she served as speaker.

Economy

Following the U.S. Supreme Court's decision in South Dakota v. Wayfair, Inc., Harwell stated she wanted to use the new income from taxes on online retailers to lower the state's sales tax.

Abortion

Harwell opposes the right to abortion and has for the last 10 years received a 100% score from the Tennessee Right to Life, an anti-abortion organization.

Second Amendment

Harwell has supported and advocated for the rights of gun owners for years as the Speaker of the Tennessee House of Representatives. Multiple laws protecting 2nd Amendment rights were passed under her leadership.

== Congressional campaign ==
On February 5, 2022, Harwell announced her intent to run for the state's 5th congressional district, after the state legislature approved a controversial redistricting plan dividing Nashville into three congressional districts in an effort to pick up an additional Republican to Tennessee's congressional delegation.

== See also ==
- List of female speakers of legislatures in the United States

Party political offices
Preceded by Chip Saltsman	Chair of the Tennessee Republican Party; 2001–2004	Succeeded by Bob Davis
Political offices
Preceded by Kent Williams	Speaker of the Tennessee House of Representatives; 2011–2019	Succeeded by Glen Casada
