= Temujin Kensu =

American prisoner (born 1963)

- Born: Fredrick Thomas Freeman; 23 May 1963 (age 63); Flint, Michigan, US
- Other names: John LaMar; Mickey Ford
- Status: Incarcerated
- Conviction: First degree murder
- Penalty: Life imprisonment

Details
- Victims: 1
- Country: United States
- State: Michigan
- Date apprehended: November 14, 1986

Temujin Kensu (born Fredrick Thomas Freeman, May 23, 1963) (Note: Sources prior to 1990 use the surname Freeman, while later sources use both Freeman and Kensu. This biography uses Freeman when describing events before 1995 and Kensu for later events.) is an American man who was convicted of first degree murder in 1987 for the shooting of Scott Macklem in Port Huron and sentenced to life imprisonment without parole.

The prosecution case was based mainly on the testimony of Macklem's fiancée, who alleged that Freeman had raped her on their first date in May 1986, and a jailhouse informant said he had heard a confession. The defense case was simply that Freeman could not have committed the crime as there were multiple witnesses who placed him over 400 miles (640 km) from the scene. However, the prosecution suggested that Freeman could have traveled there using a chartered aircraft. In prison, he converted to Buddhism and changed his name to Temujin Kensu.

In 2007, Kensu filed for habeas corpus so that his continuing detention could be challenged. The petition was allowed because of additional alibi evidence and since the informant had later admitted lying. This ruling was overturned in 2012, based on legal time limits being exceeded. Kensu’s case has attracted widespread attention as being a possible miscarriage of justice but applications for executive clemency have been turned down.

== Early life and education ==
Fredrick Thomas Freeman was born in Flint, Michigan, on May 23, 1963, one of two children of Leonard Freeman and his wife Monice (née Hoyler). He graduated in 1981 from Flint's Northern High School and joined the US Army. He was given an honorable discharge in 1982, after completing the cannon training program at Fort Sill, Oklahoma.

== Crime ==
On November 5, 1986, at about 9 a.m., 20-year-old Scott Macklem was killed by a single shotgun round while he was in the parking lot of St. Clair County Community College in Port Huron, where he was a student. No one saw the shooting but several people heard it and some would later testify that they had witnessed a man in a car leaving the scene. The police found a shotgun shell and ammunition box at the site but the murder weapon has never been traced. The victim was the son of the mayor of Croswell, Michigan, and his family was well-known in the area.

== Arrest and trial ==
The police were alerted to Freeman as a suspect by Crystal Merrill, who was then Macklem's fiancée but had had a prior relationship with Freeman in May and June that year. He was arrested on November 14, 1986, and arraigned at St. Clair County District Court. Merrill was the first prosecution witness, and testified that Freeman had threatened to kill her and Macklem if she did not stop seeing Macklem. She alleged that Freeman had raped her on their first date. Another witness, Phillip Joplin, said that Freeman had confessed to the murder while they shared a courtroom holding cell. Joplin further stated that Freeman wasn't worried about the trial because he had "constructed an airtight alibi".

That alibi was indeed strong. The defense called nine witnesses, many entirely independent of Freeman, who had seen him in and around Escanaba, a town in the Upper Peninsula of Michigan that was over 400 miles from Port Huron. However, while some witnesses had seen Freeman before 3 a.m. on the morning of the shooting and others had seen him that afternoon, there appeared to be a gap in sightings. The prosecutor, Robert Cleland, was therefore able to argue that Freeman could have chartered a private aircraft to take him to Port Huron by 9 a.m. and then return to Escanaba after the shooting. No evidence was provided that he had actually done this, although one of the eyewitnesses who were said to have seen the killer identified Freeman from photographs later shown to have been altered for the trial. That witness had been hypnotized to provide more detail in his recollection, particularly the license plate of a car seen leaving the scene.

The prosecution described Freeman as a jealous man with a violent past that included a pending assault charge and a conviction for issuing bad checks. His motive for the killing was alleged to be to control Merrill. During the trial, photographs of Freeman's martial arts weapons were shown, together with other similar items that did not belong to him: he was described as a "ninja warrior", despite the fact that the murder weapon was a 12-gauge shotgun and the fingerprint on the ammunition box found near the location did not match his. When the jury retired to consider their decision, they initially split 6–6 but after four more votes they reached a unanimous guilty verdict on May 18, 1987. One juror commented to the press that "his alibi was too perfect". Freeman was sentenced to life imprisonment without parole.

== Appeal case ==
In November 1986, Freeman was living with his pregnant girlfriend Michelle Woodworth at a rented farmhouse in Rock, about 20 miles from Escanaba. When police arrived there to attempt to arrest him, she told them that they had been at home together on November 5, including at the precise time of the shooting, and had gone with him to Escanaba later that day where others had seen them. However, the court-appointed lawyer, David Dean, did not call her as a defense witness because, although she had regularly visited Freeman prior to the trial, Dean had been unable to find her that May. Hence the jury did not hear this part of Freeman's alibi, which Dean said was grounds for a retrial.

Ralph Simpson was appointed by Michigan's State Appellate Defender's Office to act as appeal attorney for Freeman and an appeal was first filed in the summer of 1987. The case he built took several years to proceed through the courts but was assisted when information supplied by a private investigator, Allen Woodside, became available. In particular, Woodside was instrumental in getting the jailhouse informant Joplin to sign an affidavit that he had received inducements to give his testimony, namely that he would not be returned to prison but would serve the remainder of his term in community placement and that he would be given money there. Woodside obtained another affidavit, from Woodworth, that she had been threatened by police that if she persisted to give her alibi evidence in court she would be committing perjury and might lose custody of her child. In 1993, the Michigan Court of Appeals upheld the conviction, despite ruling that Freeman's defense attorney should have protested more vigorously about the inclusion of all his "prior bad acts". The Michigan Supreme Court later refused to hear the case.

== Aftermath ==
In prison, Freeman converted to Buddhism and changed his name to Temujin Kensu. In 1995 Allen Woodside alerted Bill Proctor to the case and shared documents with him. Proctor was an experienced investigative reporter with the Detroit television station WXYZ-TV and met Kensu at the Macomb Correctional Facility. Over the next year, he produced a series of five news segments that were broadcast on Channel 7 Action News. Proctor's reports included an interview with Phillip Joplin in which Joplin recanted his trial testimony. His 1990 affidavit had stated that inducements were involved but had not admitted that the testimony was actually untrue.

After Proctor's broadcasts, Kensu's case was taken up by Jonathan Maire, an attorney in Lansing, the Michigan state capital. By 2004 he had amassed sufficient new evidence, including an alternative suspect and motive for the murder, to file a second appeal in the St. Clair County Circuit Court. Judge James Adair ruled that the matters raised did not warrant a retrial or even a hearing to consider the new evidence. His decision was upheld by the Michigan Court of Appeals in August 2005 and the Supreme Court declined the case in January 2006.

In 2007, in an attempt to force the Michigan state legal system to again hear his case, Kensu filed for habeas corpus. This is a way to challenge the reasons for a person's continuing imprisonment and, if successful, to bring that person before a court. His petition went for consideration by Judge Denise Page Hood. In her written decision, Judge Hood ruled that he should be released or given a new trial on the grounds that Woodward had not been called to give additional alibi evidence and that in relation to Joplin, prosecutors "should have known his testimony was untruthful". The state attorney general filed an appeal against this decision and it was overturned in 2012 by the Court of Appeals for the Sixth Circuit, whose ruling was based on a legal technicality under the Antiterrorism and Effective Death Penalty Act of 1996, which places time limits on habeas corpus relief, and that the new evidence was not sufficient to allow an exception.

A separate commutation process led to a hearing in September 2010, when the Michigan Parole and Commutation Board considered Kensu's sentence. Governor Jennifer Granholm subsequently followed the 11–0 vote of the parole board to deny commuting the life sentence. In 2016, Kensu successfully sued the Michigan Department of Corrections over the way his medical needs had been ignored and was awarded a total of $325,000 in compensatory and punitive damages after a jury found in his favour. The St. Clair County Prosecutor at that time, Mike Wendling, believed that Kensu was manipulating the judicial system by his continuous appeals, since none of his arguments were new, and that the victim's family was being forgotten.

By 2019, Kensu's case had attracted widespread attention and was being called a miscarriage of justice. Thomas E. Brennan, former chief justice of the Michigan Supreme Court, stated "Reading the trial transcript as an outsider, you just had this smell of the whole thing. I don't see how they could convict the guy. Had I been the trial judge, I hope I would have had the guts to throw the case out." Carl Levin, a US state senator for Michigan from 1979 to 2015, said “I have personally reviewed the documents from the various court cases. As a lawyer, I believe the evidence of innocence is compelling.” Another state senator, Stephanie Chang, said “It is atrocious that this kind of miscarriage of justice could take place in our state, leaving an innocent individual in prison for multiple decades.”

In 2020, the Conviction Integrity Unit set up by Michigan Attorney General Dana Nessel considered Kensu's case and decided that there was “no new evidence that supports the factual innocence claim”. This decision was strongly condemned by senator Chang and two members of congress, Andy Levin and Rashida Tlaib, who wrote "our point of view ... is based on the fact that Kensu could not have committed and did not in fact commit the crime for which the state is taking away the entire rest of his life, now 35 years on." In June 2022, the Innocence Clinic, part of the University of Michigan Law School, submitted an application for executive clemency to Gretchen Whitmer, the governor of Michigan. This was turned down, as had been two previous pleas. As of January 2025, Kensu was still in prison at the Macomb Correctional Facility in Lenox Township, Michigan.

== Personal life ==
While in prison, Kensu began a correspondence with Denise Deringer, whom he had first met in 1979. They married in January 2001 and she took the name A'miko Kensu: she died from ovarian cancer in November 2012. On November 4, 2022, Kensu married Paula née Randolph.
