= Emily Freeman (poet) =

English poet and teacher

- Citizenship: United Kingdom
- Education: Christ's College, University of Cambridge (BA)
- Occupations: Poet, Teacher
- Writing career
- Genre: Poetry
- Notable awards: Philip Pyke Memorial Prize 2024

Emily Freeman is a Nottinghamshire-based poet and English teacher.

== Education ==
Freeman was educated at the Dukeries Academy before earning her bachelor's degree in English at Christ's College, Cambridge, where she wrote a dissertation about confessional poetry and abortion.

== Career ==
During the pandemic, Freeman was part of First Story's Young Writers Programme, and went on to become a Rathbones Folio mentee, with the poet Fiona Benson as her mentor.

In 2023, her work was included in Hive South Yorkshire's emerging young writers anthology. She was later shortlisted in the 2023 Mslexia Poetry Competition for her poem 'March', which was praised by the judge Fiona Benson for its "terrific, Plathian" imagery and "enviable musicality", and went on to win the inaugural Philip Pyke Memorial Prize in 2024 for her poem 'Our Lover's Discourse', which was praised for its "assured poetic voice."

Freeman has cited Sylvia Plath as the poet who has most directly influenced her work. In 2023, Lydia Broadley wrote: "her work does not feel forced or contrived, but rather natural, raw and deeply moving."

Freeman's poem 'Katarzyna', which the poet Jayant Kashyap praised for "looking at a difference in language" as opportunity for cultural exchange, was first published in the Substack-based The Vanity Papers and later nominated for the 2026 Forward Prize for Best Single Poem (written).

== Awards ==
- 2024: Shortlisted, Mslexia Poetry Competition 2023, for 'March'
- 2024: Winner, Philip Pyke Memorial Prize, for 'Our Lover's Discourse'
