= Justice Freeman =

Justice Freeman my refer to:

- Charles E. Freeman (1933–2020), associate justice of the Supreme Court of Illinois
- Franklin Freeman (born 1945), associate justice of the North Carolina Supreme Court
- Thomas J. Freeman (1827–1891), associate justice of the Tennessee Supreme Court

== See also ==
- Judge Freeman (disambiguation)
