= Mark Freeman (artist) =

American painter (1908–2003)

- Born: September 27, 1908; Zaleszczyki, Austria
- Died: February 6, 2003 (aged 94); New York City, U.S.
- Education: Columbia University; Sorbonne; National Academy of Design
- Known for: Painting, Printmaking

Mark Freeman (September 27, 1908 – February 6, 2003) was an Austrian-born American artist, "whose prints and paintings from the 1930s chronicle a seminal period of New York City's architectural growth in a style that has been described (by Will Barnet) as a beautiful blend of the poetic and historical."

== Biography ==
Freeman was born in 1908 in Zaleszczyki, Austria, and came to New York City in January 1923.

Freeman had a BA from Columbia College, a Bachelor of Architecture from Columbia University, a Master of Architecture from Columbia, and a Diploma of Art and Archaeology from the Sorbonne in Paris. He also studied at the National Academy of Design.

He and his wife Polly Allen (who died before him) were married for 67 years. They had two sons and seven grandchildren. Freeman died in 2003 in New York City.

== Administrative art offices ==
- 1972-1988 President, National Society of Painters in Casein and Acrylic
- 1975-1977 President, American Society of Contemporary Artists
- 1975-1976 President, League of Present Day Artists
- 1977-1979 President, Audubon Artists
- 1976-1983 Vice-President, New York City Artists Equity Association
- 1976-1983 Vice-President, Artists Welfare Fund
- 1976-1992 Chairman, Art Committee, Lotos Club, New York
- 1978-1982 Advisory Board, "Who's Who in American Art"
- 1978-1983 Editor, New York City Artists Equity Newsletter
- 1978-1983 Coordinator, Artists Welfare Fund
- 1983-1988 Consultant, New York City Artists Equity
- 1981-1988 Board of Trustees, Artists Fellowship
- 1988-2003 Advisory Board, Artists Fellowship

== Awards ==
- Honorary Life President, Audubon Artists
- Honorary Life President, National Society of Painters in Casein and Acrylic
- Associate Member, National Academy of Design (A.N.A.)

== Selected exhibitions ==
- 1968, 1969 Institute of Arts and Letters
- 80 American Prints, State Dept. Traveling Exhibition Europe and North Africa
- International Biennials of Color Lithography
- 1951, 1953, 1955 Cincinnati Museum of Art
- 1964 (solo exhibition) Parrish Art Museum, Southampton, NY
- 15 Artists of the Region, Guild Hall, East Hampton, NY
- New Print Techniques, Philadelphia Museum of Art, Philadelphia, PA
- Printmakers of Long Island, Parrish Art Museum, Southampton, NY
- South Fork Artists, from Childe Hassam to Jackson Pollock
- Four Printmakers, Guild Hall, East Hampton, NY
- 1990 Detroit Art Institute, Detroit, MI
- 1990 Bergen Art Museum, Paramus, NJ
- 1991 Elliot Art Museum, Stuart, FL

== Represented in permanent collections ==
- Museum of Modern Art (MoMA), New York City
- British Museum, London, England
- Whitney Museum of American Art, New York City
- Metropolitan Museum of Art, New York City
- National Academy of Design, NY
- Brooklyn Museum, NY
- Queens Museum of Art, NY
- Museum of the City of New York
- Library of Congress, Washington, D.C.
- Hengeloose Kunstzaal, the Netherlands
- Corcoran Gallery of Art, Washington, D.C.
- National Museum of American History (Smithsonian Institution), Washington, D.C.
- Butler Institute of American Art, OH
- Herbert F. Johnson Museum of Art, Ithaca, NY
- Norfolk Art Museum, VA
- Elliott Museum, Stuart, FL
- Fort Wayne Art Museum, Indiana
- Holyoke Art Museum, MA
- Springfield Art Museum, MA
- Boston Library, Boston, MA
- Wolfson Foundation, Miami, FL
- Slater Art Museum, CT
- Parrish Art Museum, Southampton, NY
- Guild Hall, East Hampton, NY
- Lotus Club, NY
- Wichita Art Museum, Kansas
- St. Vincent's College, PA
- New Britain Museum of American Art, CT

== Bibliography ==
- Peter H Falk; Audrey M Lewis; Georgia Kuchen; Veronika Roessler, Who was Who in American Art 1564–1975 ISBN 0-932087-55-8, ISBN 978-0-932087-55-3
- Mark Freeman, New York 1929–1932: Reaching for the Sky ISBN 0-9633374-0-8
