= Peter Freeman =

Peter Freeman may refer to:

- Peter A. Freeman (born 1941), founding dean of the Georgia Tech College of Computing
- Peter Freeman (musician) (1965–2021), American multi-instrumentalist, composer and music producer
- Peter Freeman (footballer) (born 1969), former Australian rules footballer
- Peter Freeman (politician) (1888–1956), Labour Party politician in the United Kingdom

== See also ==
- Peter Friedman (born 1949), American actor
