= Roger A. Freeman (economist) =

American economist (1904–1991)

Roger Adolf Freeman
- Born: September 2, 1904; Vienna, Austria-Hungary
- Died: December 25, 1991 (aged 87); Stanford, California
- Occupation: Economist

Roger Adolf Freeman (born Roger Adolf Freimann; September 2, 1904 – December 25, 1991) was an Austrian-American economist. He served as an advisor to Dwight D. Eisenhower, a senior fellow at the Hoover Institution, a special assistant in the Nixon administration, and an advisor to then-California Governor Ronald Reagan. Freeman specialized in public finance within the neoclassical liberal tradition. He was a critic of the welfare state, an advocate for welfare reform, and a defender of fiscal conservatism. His criticism of desegregation and his advocacy for reducing federal funding for education received attention for its impact on public policy and student loan debt in the United States.

== Biography ==
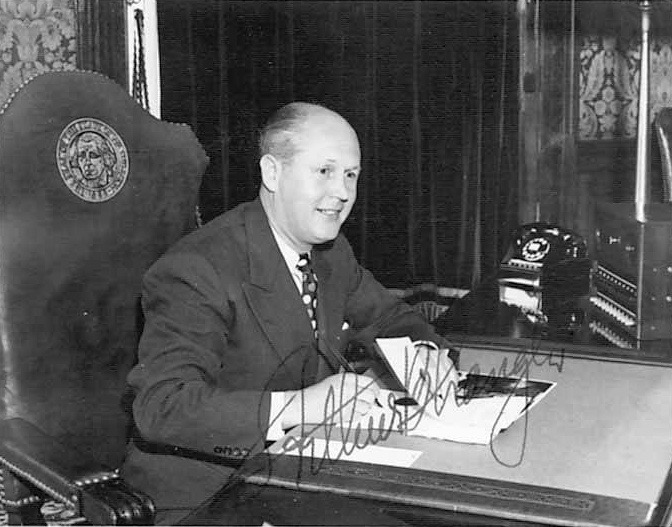
Freeman began his career working for governor Arthur B. Langlie (pictured)

=== Early life ===
Roger Adolf Freimann was born in Vienna, Austria-Hungary, on September 2, 1904. His father, Samuel Freimann, was a banker who died in 1921. Vienna was suffering from post-WWI inflation, leaving Freimann and his mother in poverty. They rented rooms out in their house and Freimann worked odd jobs while his mother went back to work. Things began to improve in 1924. The young Freimann studied and received his degree from Vienna University of Economics and Business (1927), and spent more than a decade working for Delka, an Austrian shoe retailer. After Adolf Hitler annexed Austria in March 1938, Freimann emigrated to Great Britain (1939) and then to the United States (1940).

Arriving in New York at the end of the Great Depression, Freeman was hard-pressed to find a job with unemployment at 15 percent. A visit to a public library turned things around. He found an article in a trade journal which gave him an idea about a shoe merchandising problem. He soon wrote his own article about the problem and got it published. Freeman then sent the published article attached to his resume to 100 different shoe firms across the country and received several job offers. He later recalled that was the last time he ever looked for a job. From then on, people would just offer him jobs. He was hired as manager of the W. L. Douglas Shoe Company, later becoming the CFO of Shoe Corp. of America. In 1949, the state of Washington requested his services to assist them with their budget crisis, where he served as an assistant to Governor Arthur B. Langlie.

=== Eisenhower administration ===
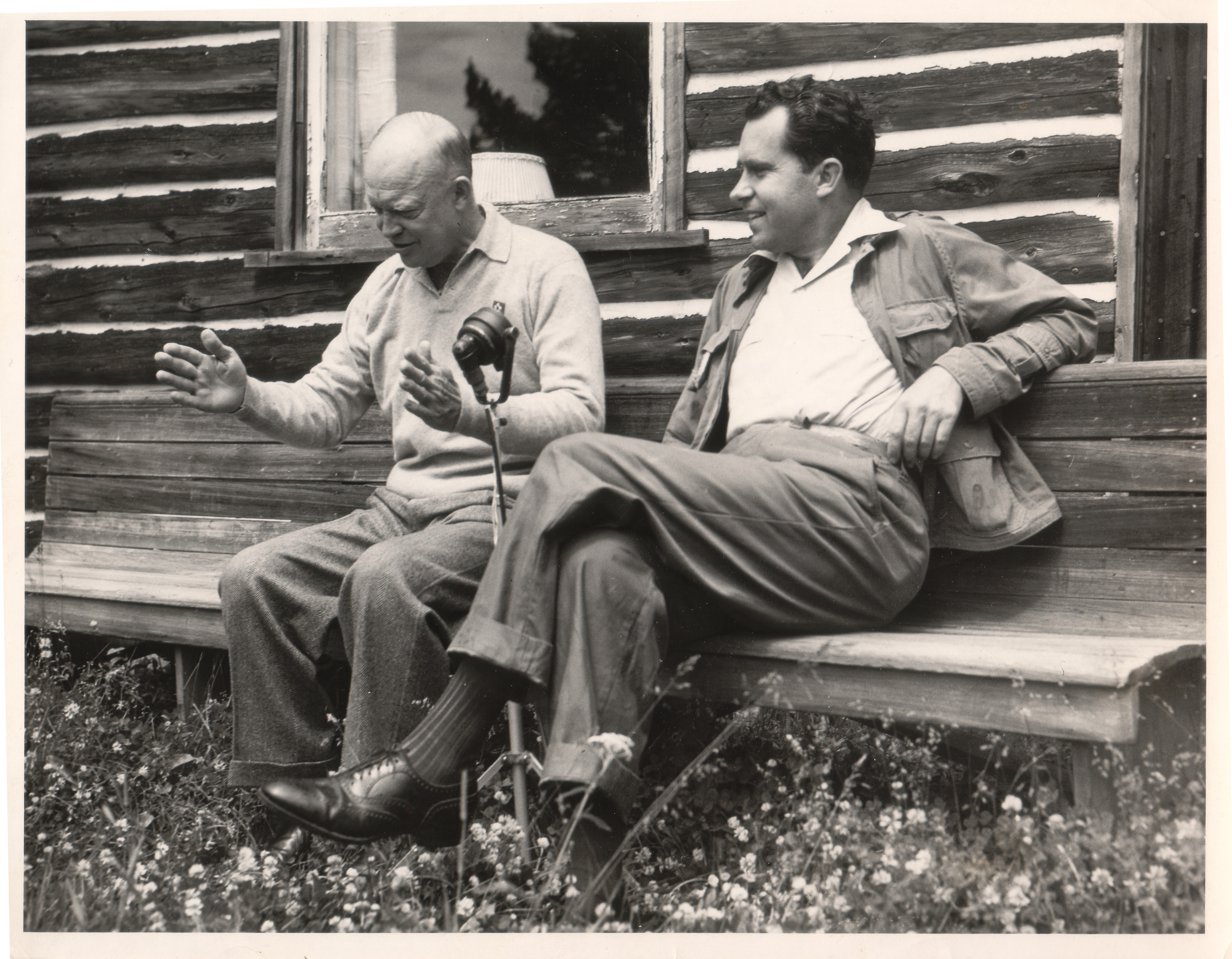
Freeman advised Eisenhower and Nixon (pictured)

Freeman was brought to Washington, D.C. in 1953 to participate in Dwight D. Eisenhower's Commission on Intergovernmental Relations in a staff position role. In 1955, he became an assistant to the White House. The U.S. Treasury made Freeman financial advisor to Bolivia in 1956. He then served as vice president for the Institute for Social Science Research from 1957 to 1962. In 1958, Freeman worked with James M. Buchanan on the Committee on the Financing of Public Education for the National Tax Association, where they both opposed the funding of public schools and the federal taxes needed to finance it. Freeman and others complained that the National Tax Association was influenced by liberal bias because the group supported higher taxes to fund education.

=== Hoover Institution, Nixon administration ===
In 1961, Freeman was research director at the Institute for Studies in Federalism at what was then known as Claremont Men's College. He was made a senior fellow at the Hoover Institution at Stanford University (1962-1975), and served as chairman of the revenue sharing task force for the Republican National Committee in 1967. He was also special assistant to the president in the Nixon administration (1969-1970). Journalist John Chamberlain wrote that Freeman "quit the Nixon White House in a fit of acute frustration" over concerns about Nixon's penchant for funding government programs. Prior to his departure, journalist Holmes Alexander promoted Freeman as a candidate for United States Commissioner of Education under Nixon. Alexander speculates that Freeman left the White House due to Daniel Patrick Moynihan, who was then Counselor to the President. Moynihan's influence, writes Alexander, may have led to Freeman's removal from a school policy task force, and ultimately Freeman's resignation.

=== Reagan gubernatorial aide ===
In the 1970 California gubernatorial election, Freeman advised incumbent Governor Ronald Reagan during his campaign for re-election. At a press conference for Reagan on October 29, 1970, Freeman spoke on the issue of cutting funding for education:

We are in danger of producing an educated proletariat. That's dynamite! We have to be selective on who we allow to go through (higher education). If not, we will have a large number of highly trained and unemployed people. That's what happened in Germany. I saw it happen.

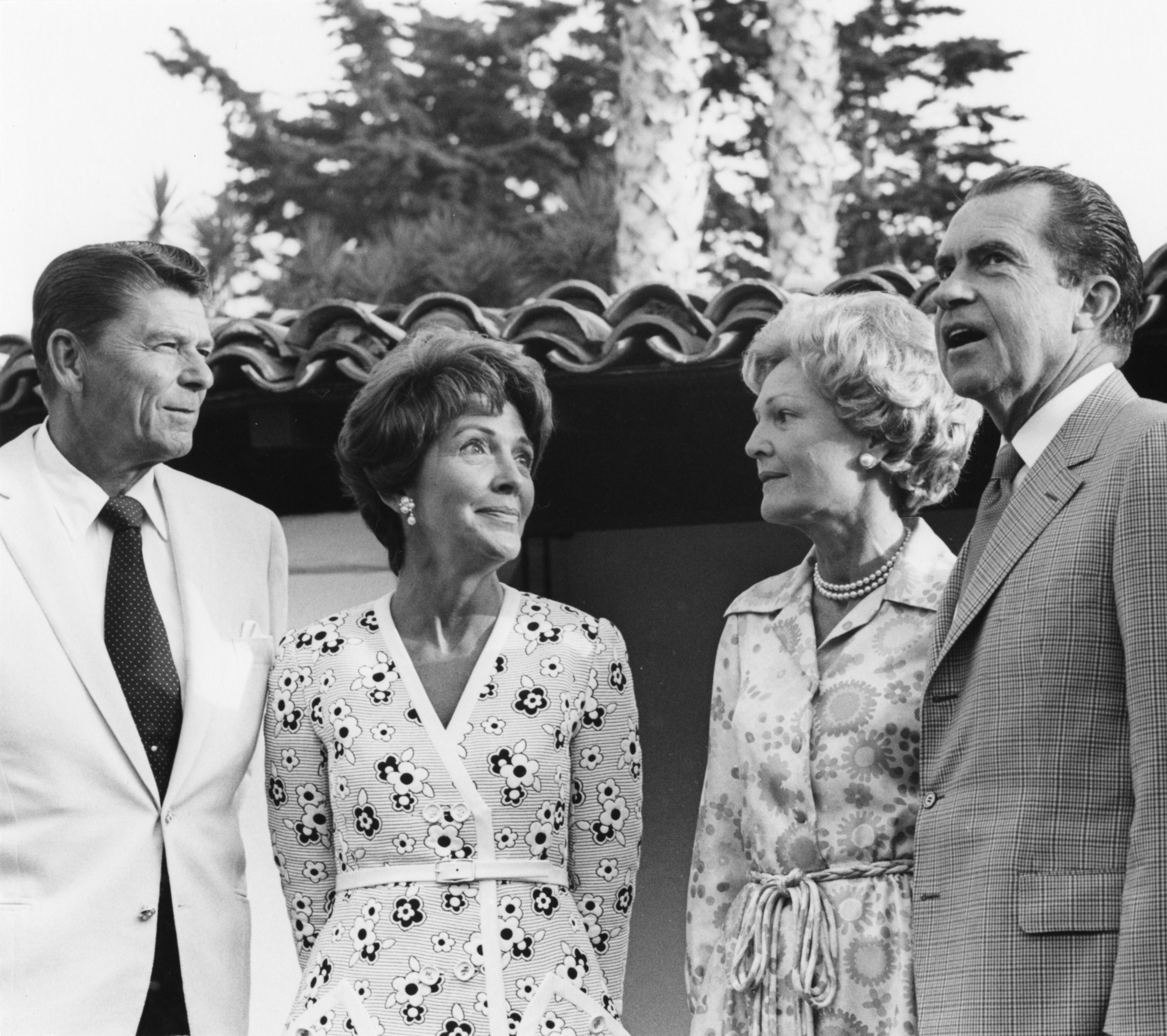
Freeman was Reagan's advisor during his 1970 California gubernatorial campaign

Freeman disputed statistics that showed the benefits of a college degree, denied that it was the great equalizer, (Note: Horace Mann (1848): "Education, then, beyond all other devices of human origin, is the great equalizer of the conditions of men, - the balance wheel of the social machinery. I do not here mean that it so elevates the moral nature as to make men disdain and abhor...oppression of their fellow men...I mean that it gives each man the independence and the means by which he can resist the selfishness of other men. It does better than to disarm the poor of their hostility towards the rich: it prevents being poor... if this education should be universal and complete, it would do more than all things else to obliterate [erase] distinctions in society.") and believed that college should be reserved for a select few. As early as 1961, Freeman was openly promoting the idea of raising tuition fees so that state and local treasuries would no longer have to cover the costs of education. By 1968, he was criticizing desegregation efforts in The Wall Street Journal, saying that there was no evidence that desegregation leads to better educational outcomes, arguing instead that student achievement comes down to "genetic factors and environmental influences".

He believed that the countercultural movements of the 1960s, which led to campus protests and racial riots, were caused by an increase in welfare benefits. Freeman blamed what he perceived as a left-wing intelligentsia (Note: Reagan himself had made many similar arguments in the past. During the protests against the Vietnam War in 1968, Reagan called on sanctions against university faculty who were known to have taken part. In a televised debate with Owen Chamberlain and others a week after the 1969 People's Park protests, Reagan, who had sent in the California National Guard to stop the protests, blamed the academic community for encouraging students to break the law and engage in violent acts.) working within the U.S. government who he believed were aligned with those who received welfare benefits, leading to larger and larger government budgets. (Note: Seiter 1999: [Freeman believed that the decline in free market forces was due to] "the influence of intellectuals working within government advisory teams, where they have opportunities for power...these intellectuals, who were often left-leaning by American standards [had ideals that] align well with the interests of welfare beneficiaries, leading to an alliance [that drives] rising government budgets. The provision of social benefits...also fosters a demand for even more subsidies...the student and racial unrest of the 1960s in the United States did not arise [according to Freeman] despite the expansion of welfare benefits, but rather because of it...Keynesian economics thus served not only as a tool to address cyclical economic problems [by redistributing purchasing power from higher to lower-income groups] but also as a convenient justification for the expansion of the welfare state. [For Freeman, a] consequence of the policies of the 1960s and 1970s...was the transformation of the principle of 'equal opportunity for all' into 'equal results for all.'")

From 1972 to 1973, Freeman served on Governor Reagan's tax reduction task force. Freeman was made professor of economics at Hillsdale College in 1977. He died from stomach cancer in 1991 in Stanford, California.

== Analysis ==
Economist Stephan Seiter places Freeman's research into the tradition of New Political Economy (NPE) theory, following the work of James M. Buchanan. Freeman's ideas aligned with the policies of Ronald Reagan, whom Freeman admired and to who he dedicated his books. Seiter notes that some of the systemic changes promoted by Freeman came to pass in the 1980s, but their efficacy remains in doubt. In terms of their outcomes, Seiter points to the creation of low paid service jobs and the rise of income inequality in the United States. Seiter describes Freeman's work as an American phenomenon, writing "from a European perspective, many of [Freeman's] conclusions are open to criticism."

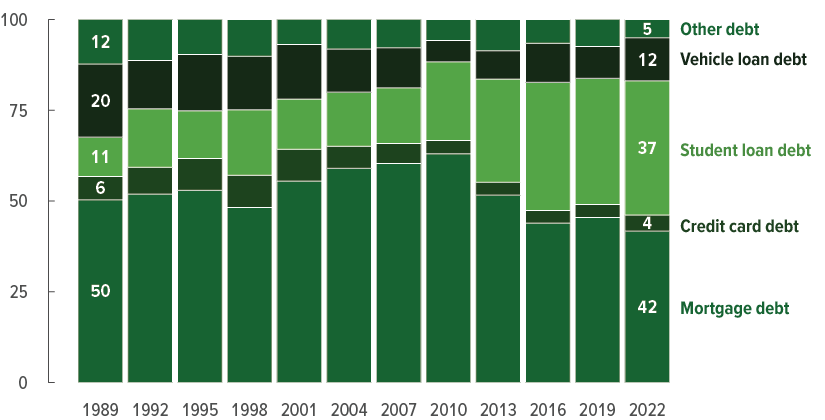
Increasing student loan percent of total household debt for people in the bottom 25% by wealth. As the borrower pool under the more difficult bankruptcy rules has increased, so has the percent of total debt for those poorer borrowers least able to pay all debts.

Economist Gordon Lafer found that Freeman's position on reducing federal funding for education originated with the fears of the elite in the 1960s and 1970s who believed that educating the working class in hard times could be dangerous. Lafer argued that in periods of sustained stagnation, the elite wanted to avoid having "a lot of well-educated poor people". They viewed cuts to public education as a strategy that prevented unrest, but also increased inequality. Cultural historian H. Bruce Franklin called Freeman's push to restrict access to California's public colleges a "conservative counterattack" on education that began under Nixon and escalated under Reagan. Other scholars have labeled the shift a "racial education tax" that disproportionately harmed African Americans and the poor.

Sociologist Britain Hopkins studied higher education policy and analyzed Freeman's contributions as part of her work on the origins of the student loan industry in the United States from 1953 to 1973. She found that Freeman was one of the key players in the development of the Guaranteed Student Loan Program, which is today known as the Federal Direct Student Loan Program. (Note: Hopkins argues that this relationship resulted in a system of "market-based finance and individualized debt", where student loans were "commodified and made profitable through their securitization via Sallie Mae from the early 1970s", which offered "the promise—an illusion—of class mobility through attainment of higher [education] while at the same time tethering borrowers to an increasingly precarious labor market through debt repayment.") Hopkins writes that Freeman worked on both sides of the industry, for the United Student Aid Funds (USAF) and the American Bankers Association (ABA), as well as for the federal government and Sallie Mae. In her research, Hopkins found that Freeman's work for USAF and the ABA helped restrict people's ability to have their student loans forgiven by declaring bankruptcy. Journalist Jon Schwarz points to Freeman's work as one of the ways of understanding why U.S. conservatives have attacked academia since the 1960s and how over time Americans came to owe trillions (Note: As of 2025, Americans owe more than $1.6 trillion in outstanding federal student loan debt. Student loan debt is the second-largest type of consumer debt in the United States after mortgages. After college, the average U.S. student owes $40,000 in debt.) in student debt.

Group Research Inc. classified Freeman as a "right-wing activist" in their archival research on right-wing politics in the United States. (Note: Group Research Inc. was founded by journalist and political analyst Wesley McCune in 1962 and was based in Washington, D.C. until the 1990s. They archived 40 years of published works by the American right-wing, including publications by organizations and activists. See the Rare Book & Manuscript Library at Columbia University.)

== Selected works ==
- School Needs in the Decade Ahead. Washington, DC, 1958
- Socialism and private enterprise in Equatorial Asia: the case of Malaysia and Indonesia. Stanford, Calif. Hoover Inst. on War, Revolution and Peace, Stanford Univ., 1968
- Welfare reform and the family assistance plan. Washington: Gov.Print.Off., 1972
- Tax loopholes: the legend and the reality. Washington, DC: American Enterprise Institute for Public Policy Research, 1973
- The Growth of the American Government. A Morphology of the Welfare State. Hoover Institution Press, 1975
- The Wayward Welfare State. Hoover Institution Press, 1981
- Soziale Sicherheit im defekten Wohlfahrtsstaat, Übersetzung H. Hoffmann, in: Zeitschrift für Wirtschaftspolitik, 1982, S. 97–109
