= Erika Freeman =

Austrian-born psychotherapist

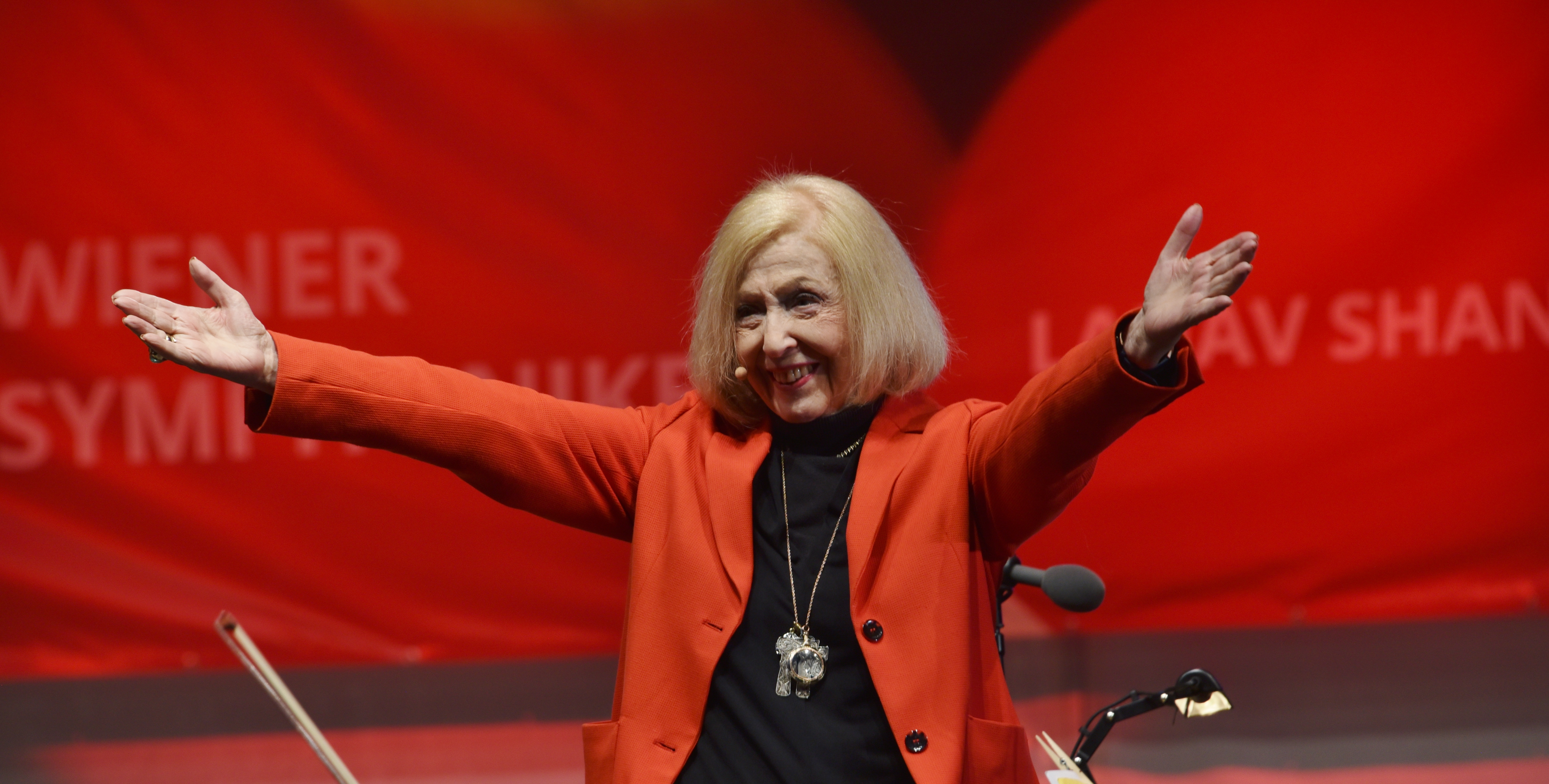
- Born: Erika Polesiuk; 1927 (age 98–99); Vienna, First Austrian Republic
- Citizenship: Austrian

Erika Freeman (née Polesiuk, born 1 July 1927, Vienna) is an Austrian-born psychotherapist and former student of Theodor Reik in New York.

== Biography ==
In 1939, at age 12, Freeman fled her native Vienna to escape the Nazis. Her mother was killed near the end of World War II; her father was a survivor of Theresienstadt concentration camp.

Freeman emigrated to the United States, where she built a career as a well-known therapist and public figure in New York City. She studied at Columbia University. Beginning in the 1970s, she appeared on television as a "commentator and expert on psychoanalysis".

Freeman is widely known for her roles in public discourse in Austria, her talks to school classes about The Holocaust and antisemitism, and her roles with the Fest der Freude, the annual celebration on 8 May at Heldenplatz, the location of one of Hitler's most infamous speeches in 1938.

== Personal life ==
She returned to Vienna in her 90s, where she lives in Hotel Imperial. A floor of the Hotel Imperial used to be Hitler's residence when in Vienna. Freeman considers living at the hotel to be her "revenge on Hitler". In 2022, Freeman accepted Austrian citizenship following changes in Austrian citizenship law that year, which bestowed citizenship to descendants of Nazi victims.

== Bibliography ==
- Erika Padan: Psychological study of a family in a kibbutz in Israel. Dissertation Columbia University, 1964 Microfilm
- Erika Freeman: Insights; conversations with Theodor Reik. Englewood Cliffs, N.J. : Prentice-Hall, 1971
