= Eric Freeman (artist) =

American artist (1970–2021)

Eric Freeman (1970 – August 3, 2021) was an American artist based in New York City.

Freeman was born in Brooklyn. He painted on linen with oils, creating abstract landscapes which reference Color Field painting and optical illusions. His work has drawn comparison to Mark Rothko, Ellsworth Kelly, James Turrell, Frank Stella, Dan Flavin and Josef Albers. Freeman died August 3, 2021.

== Selected exhibitions ==
1999

- Gallery 56, Budapest, Hungary
- Size Matters, Gale Gates, Brooklyn

2000

- Stefan Stux Gallery, Project Room, New York

2003

- Bjorn Wetterling Gallery, Stockholm

2004

- New Paintings, Western Project, Culver City

2005

- Alain Noirhumme, Brussels, Belgium
- Mary Boone Gallery, New York
