= Carl H. Freeman =

United States Army general

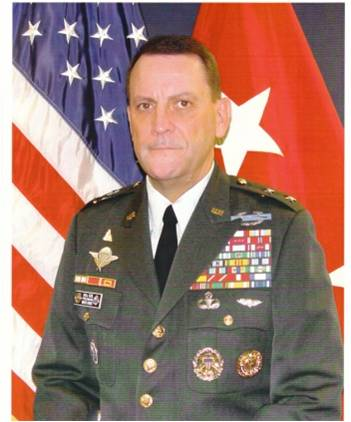
- Major General Carl H. Freeman; U.S. Army Quartermaster Hall of Fame Inductee
- Born: 1947 (age 78–79); Lynwood, California
- Military career
- Allegiance: United States of America
- Branch: United States Army
- Service years: 1969 - 2005
- Rank: Major General

Major General Carl H. Freeman, USA (born 1947) is a retired American Quartermaster officer and former chairman of the Inter-American Defense Board, Washington, D.C.

== Early life ==
Freeman was born in Lynwood, California. He entered on active duty in 1969 at Fort Benning, Georgia as a Second Lieutenant. Over the course of his military career he served in Vietnam and as both an Infantry and Quartermaster Officer.

== Military career ==
Freeman's past assignments include Commander, I Company, 1st Battalion, later Commander, 267th Petroleum Company, 240th Quartermaster Battalion, Fort Lee, Virginia; Commander, 612th Quartermaster Company (Aerial Delivery), 1st Corps Support Command, XVIII Airborne Corps, Fort Bragg, North Carolina; Aide-de-Camp to the Commander in Chief, US Southern Command, Quarry Heights, Panama; Chief, Officer Personnel Systems Division, Office of the Quartermaster General, Fort Lee, Virginia; Commander, 407th Supply and Transportation Battalion, 82nd Airborne Division, Fort Bragg, North Carolina; Commander 46th Corps Support Group, 1st Corps Support Command, XVIII Airborne Corps, Fort Bragg, North Carolina; Assistant Commandant, US Army Quartermaster Center and School, Fort Lee, Virginia; Commander, Defense Personnel Support Center, Defense Logistics Agency, Philadelphia, Pennsylvania, and Commanding General, 1st Corps Support Command, XVIII Airborne Corps, Fort Bragg, North Carolina. Major General Freeman culminated his distinguished career as the chairman, Inter-American Defense Board,

== Education ==
Freeman graduated from the University of Alabama with a Master of Arts degree in Latin American Studies, and he also received a Bachelor of Arts degree in history from Lafayette College. His military education includes the Infantry Officer Basic Course, Parachute Rigger Course, the Quartermaster Officer Advanced Course, Foreign Area Officer Course, the Mexican War College, the US Army School of the Americas, the US Army War College, and the CAPSTONE Military Leadership Program.

== Decorations and honors ==
- Distinguished Service Medal (U.S. Army)
- Defense Superior Service Medal with oak leaf cluster
- Legion of Merit with three oak leaf clusters
- Bronze Star Medal
- Purple Heart
- Defense Meritorious Service Medal
- Meritorious Service Medal with two oak leaf clusters
- Joint Service Commendation Medal
- Army Commendation Medal with oak leaf cluster
- Army Achievement Medal
- Combat Infantryman Badge
- Master Parachutist Badge
- Parachute Rigger Badge
- Joint Chiefs of Staff Identification Badge

Freeman is a Distinguished Member of the Quartermaster Regiment, recipient of the Distinguished Order of Saint Martin and a member of the Quartermaster Hall of Fame.

He holds the Ford Foundation-Harvard University Innovations in American Government Award and the Organization of American States Medal for distinguished service in the areas of humanitarian de-mining and natural disaster assistance.
