= Eric Freeman (farmer) =

English farmer and broadcaster (1932 – 2023)

Eric Freeman (8 September 1932 – 29 October 2023) was an English farmer and broadcaster.

== Biography ==
Freeman was born into a dairy farming family in 1932. He completed his formal education at the age of 16. Later, he and his brother Barrie established a poultry processing business that expanded with the introduction of electric plucking machines.

By the late 1970s, the Freeman brothers' operation had grown to process 40,000 birds weekly.

In the late 1980s, Freeman shifted his focus towards the conservation of rare livestock breeds, notably working to prevent the extinction of Old Gloucester cattle, a breed once prevalent in his region. His efforts extended to other traditional breeds such as the Gloucester Old Spots pig and the Cotswold sheep, contributing to their preservation at a time when such breeds were not widely recognized for their value.

Freeman was actively involved in the revival of traditional agricultural practices and rural customs. His contributions to the field of conservation were recognized with awards, including one from Prince Charles in 2013. He also engaged in broadcasting, sharing his knowledge on programs such as BBC Radio 4's Farming Today and the television program Two Fat Ladies.

Freeman was also a founding member of the Rare Breeds Survival Trust.
