= Nathaniel Freeman (physician) =

American politician

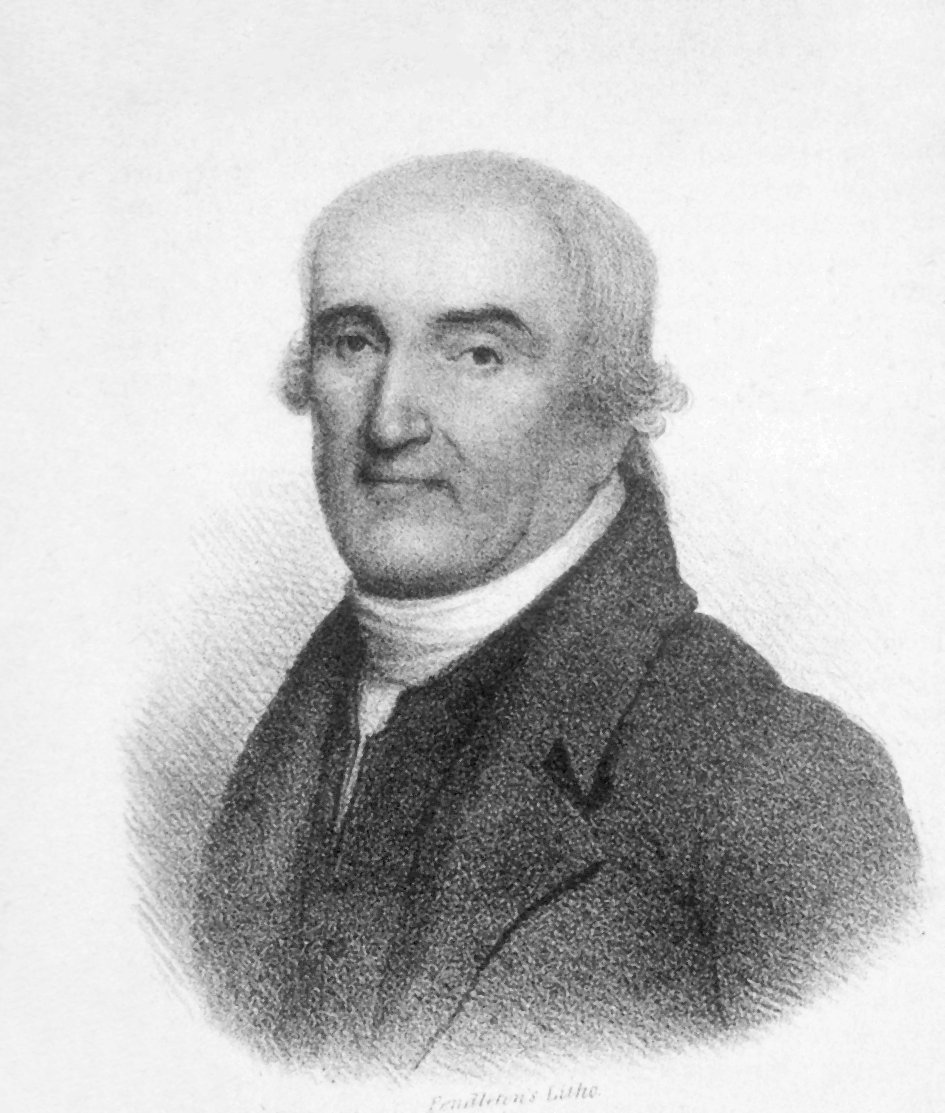

Member of the Massachusetts House of Representatives from the Sandwich district
- In office 1775–1775

Personal details
- Born: March 28, 1741 Dennis, Massachusetts, British America
- Died: September 20, 1827
- Relations: Son: Rep. Nathaniel Freeman, Jr.
- Occupation: Physician, Judge

Military service
- Allegiance: United States of America
- Branch/service: Massachusetts Militia
- Years of service: 1776–1791
- Rank: Brigadier general
- Battles/wars: American Revolutionary War

Nathaniel Freeman (March 28, 1741 – September 20, 1827) was an American medical doctor and jurist. He was a brigadier general during the American Revolutionary War and a member of the Massachusetts House of Representatives in 1775.

== Biography ==
Nathaniel Freeman born in Dennis, Barnstable County, Massachusetts in 1741. He settled at Sandwich (also Barnstable County) in 1763 where he established a medical practice. He also studied law.

In 1773, Freeman became chairman of the Committee of Correspondence of Safety of Sandwich. In September of 1774 he was chosen the leader of a mass protest against the British "Intolerable Acts," which won the agreement of county officials to ignore the requirements of Parliament's new legislation. The following year was elected a member of the Massachusetts House of Representatives and was appointed colonel of a militia regiment.

Freeman served during the American Revolutionary War, commanding a militia regiment in the Rhode Island expedition, and from 1781 to 1791 he was brigadier general of militia. He was also a judge of probate and of the Court of Common Pleas.

In 1814, Freeman was elected a member of the American Antiquarian Society
