= Aaron Freeman (politician) =

American politician

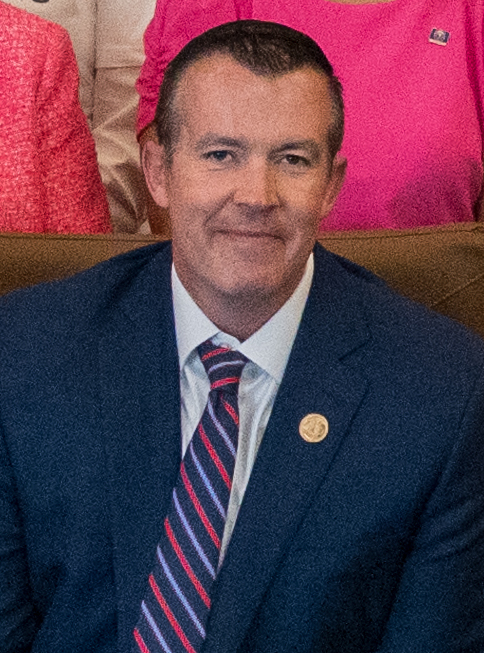

Member of the Indiana Senate from the 32nd district
- Incumbent
- Assumed office 2016
- Preceded by: Patricia Miller

Member of the Indianapolis City-County Council from the 25th district
- In office 2010–2016
- Preceded by: Lincoln Plowman
- Succeeded by: Brian Mowery

Personal details
- Party: Republican
- Spouse: Heather
- Children: 2
- Education: Bradley University (BS); University of Dayton (JD)

Aaron Freeman is an American lawyer and politician from the state of Indiana. He has been a Republican member of the Indiana Senate from 2016, representing the 32nd district. He previously served on the Indianapolis City-County Council from 2010 to 2016.

== Early life and education ==
Freeman grew up in Brookville, Indiana. After graduating from high school, he became an emergency medical technician, reserve deputy sheriff, and 9-1-1 dispatcher. He graduated from Bradley University and the University of Dayton School of Law.

== Career as prosecutor and lawyer in private practice ==
Freeman was a Marion County deputy prosecutor before entering the private practice of law as the owner of his own firm, Aaron Freeman Law Office, LLC, which he opened in 2010 in Franklin Township.

== Political career ==
Freeman joined the Indianapolis City-County Council in March 2010, after being selected by Republican precinct committee members to fill a vacancy created by the resignation of Lincoln Plowman. Freeman was a member of the council for six years, representing a district in the southeast side of the city.

He was elected to the Indiana State Senate in 2016 from District 32, Freeman received 31,173 votes (58.2%), defeating Democratic nominee Sara Wiley, who received 20,184 votes (37.7%). Freeman succeeded longtime Senator Patricia L. Miller, who chose to retire after 34 years in the General Assembly.

Freeman describes himself as a "solid Republican" and a conservative. In 2016, weeks after the killings of Alton Sterling and Philando Castile, Freeman dismissed the Black Lives Matter movement, saying on a segment on Full Frontal with Samantha Bee, "I just don't think it's helpful to the country. I don't know what their purpose is." The comments were raised in 2020 by Democratic state Senator Eddie Melton, who asked Freeman to drop his reelection bid over the comments, a request that Freeman rebuffed.

After Republican Senator Ron Alting sponsored a hate crimes bill in the state Senate in 2019, seeking to allow judges to increase sentences for bias-motivated crimes (Indiana is one of just five states without such a law), Freeman introduced an amendment that gutted the bill, removing the specified protection categories—race, religion, sex, sexual orientation, gender identity, and disability—and replacing them with a generic definition of "bias." After the amendment passed on a 33–16 vote, Alting voted against the bill as amended, honoring a pledge not to support any hate-crimes bill that omitted protections based on sexual orientation or gender identity.

In the state Senate, Freeman has been a prominent and avowed opponent of plans for an expansion of Indianapolis's IndyGo bus rapid transit system. In 2018, in response to mass shootings at schools, Freeman called for the stationing of police officers at every school, saying, "We need to harden these targets and we'll put a stop to this." For three consecutive years, Freeman sponsored legislation to criminalize "revenge porn"; the measure was enacted in 2019. Along with other Republican lawmakers, he supported a bill in 2020 to ban local governments in Indiana from enacting tenant protection regulations; the bill was backed by landlords and opposed by tenant advocates.

Freeman defeated Democratic nominee Belinda Drake in 2020 to retain his seat in the Indiana General Assembly.

== Personal life ==
Freeman is married and has two sons. He lives in Franklin Township.
