= 10th Shorty Awards =

Awards show for short-form social web media content

10th Annual Shorty Awards
- Date: April 15, 2018
- Location: PlayStation Theater, New York City
- Hosted by: Keke Palmer

The 10th Annual Shorty Awards powered by DirecTV Now, honoring the best in social media, took place on April 15, 2018, at the PlayStation Theater, New York City. The ceremony was hosted by actress, singer, songwriter, Keke Palmer.

== Influencer winners and nominees ==
Nominations were announced on January 16, 2018, with public voting closing on February 22, 2018. Finalists were announced on March 20, 2018. Winners were announced at the ceremony on April 15, 2018. Winners are listed first and in boldface.

=== Arts & Entertainment ===
**Best Actor**: **Ansel Elgort**; Constance Wu; Gal Gadot; Terry Crews; Tiffany Haddish; Tracee Ellis Ross	**Best Celebrity**: **Rihanna**; Andy Cohen; Jimmy Kimmel; Miley Cyrus; RuPaul; Snoop Dogg
**Best Comedian**: **Kristen Schaal**; Billy Eichner; Eric Andre; Hasan Minhaj; Lena Waithe; Margaret Cho	**Best in Dance**: **Backpack Kid**; Brown Girls Do Ballet; Kyle Hanagami; Les Twins; Merrick Hanna; Tessa Brooks
**Best in Music**: **Cardi B**; Dua Lipa; Kesha; Khalid; Logic; SZA	**Best TV Show**: **Rick & Morty**; 13 Reasons Why; Blackish; Riverdale; The Good Place; This is Us

=== Content of the Year ===
**Emoji of the Year**: **Unicorn 🦄**; Avocado 🥑; Bowie 👩‍🎤👨‍🎤; Facepalm 🤦‍♀️; Meh 😐; Rainbow 🌈	**GIF of the Year**: **A Clap for the Ages**; Blinking White Man; Get Out; Salt Bae; Winona Ryder's Face at the SAG; YAS MERYL
**Instagram of the Year**: **Solar Eclipse by Dave Krugman**; Beyonce's Birth Announcement; I can't believe I still...; Ok we're ready; Vegas Strong; Who's that in the mirror	**Meme of the Year**: **Distracted Boyfriend**; Expanding brain; Right in front of my salad; Roll Safe; The Floor is...; Tiny Trump

=== Creative & Media ===
**Best Animal**: **We Rate Dogs**; Albert (albertonwheels); Cincinnati Zoo; Esther the Wonder Pig; Manny The Selfie Cat; NORBERT	**Best in Art**: **Web Comic Name**; Alexa Meade; Charlotte Love; Chris Hong; Dan Hogman; Toyin Ojih Odutola
**Best in Beauty**: **Nyma Tang**; Jake Warden; Patricia Bright; Raw Beauty Kristi; Simply Nailogical; Sydney Szramowski / sydn4sty; Thomas Halbert	**Best in Fashion**: **Accidental Icon**; Benjamin Kicks; Lainy Hedaya; Pia Arrobio; Victoria Beckham; What Fran Wore
**Best in Food**: **Rosanna Pansino**; Binging with Babish; Daym Drops; First We Feast; Nusret (SaltBae) Gökçe; Rachael Ray	**Best in Health & Wellness**: **Sophia Gall**; Dr. Mike; Elyse Fox; Emily Skye; Katie Willcox; Valerie Sagun
**Best in House & Home**: **LaurDIY**; **The Sorry Girls**; Andy & Candis Meredith; Château de Gudanes; I Have This Thing With Floors; Kelly Wearstler	**Instagrammer of the Year**: **Doug the Pug**; Celebs on Sandwiches; Desirée De León; Paulo del Valle; Stephen McMennamy; Vickie Liu
**Best Journalist**: **April D. Ryan**; Amina Khan; Ellen McGirt; Jason Concepcion; Michelle Ye Hee Lee; Ronan Farrow	**Best in Lifestyle**: **Katie Sturino**; LaTonya Yvette; Lauren Elizabeth; Nabela Noor; Paloma Elsesser; Sai De Silva
**Best LGBTQ+ Account**: **Miles McKenna**; Alok V Menon; Aydian Dowling; Lateef Thynative; Stephanie Frosch; Trixie Mattel	**Best in Literature**: **Chimamanda Ngozi Adichie**; Cleo Wade; Jon Ronson; Jonny Sun; Kevin Kwan; Rebecca Traister
**Best in Meme/Parody Account**: **FuckJerry**; Adam The Creator; Bros Being Basic; Comment Awards; daddyissues_; Kim Kierkegaardashian	**Best in Parenting/Family**: **Fathering Autism**; Action Movie Kid; Cute Girls Hairstyles; Laura Izumikawa; MAZELEE; Two Gay Papas
**Best in Sports**: **Serena Williams**; Brooke Ence; JJ Watt; Katie Ledecky; Kevin Durant; Laila Ali	**Best Web Series**: **Hot Ones**; Buddy System; Escape the Night; OMG We're Coming Over; Speechless with Carly Fleischmann; The Breakdown; Real Bros of Simi Valley
**Best in Weird**: **Poppy**; Adam Ellis; If you high; James Fridman; NOT A WOLF; The Report of the Week	

=== Team Internet ===
**Breakout YouTuber of the Year**: **Elle Mills**; Beau Brown; Emma Chamberlain; Karina Garcia; Molly Burke; Teala Dunn	**Creator of the Decade**: **MKBHD**; Casey Neistat; Jenna Marbles; Lilly Singh; Liza Koshy; Rhett & Link
**Instagrammer of the Year**: **Topher Brophy**; Betches; Boop My Nose; But Like Maybe; Coco Pink Princess; Pete Souza	**Live Streamer of the Year**: **Scott Rogowsky**; Ariel Viera; Dick Vitale; Emma McGann; Thomas Kuc; Vin Diesel
**Muser of the Year**: **Annie LeBlanc**; Chuch the Cavalier; Jayden Bartels; Lucas and Marcus; Lucki Starr; Rebecca Zamolo	**Snapchatter of the Year**: **Spencer Pratt**; Andy Burgess; Chrissy Teigen; Georgio Copter; Laura Perlongo; Ross Smith
**Twitch Streamer of the Year**: **Pokimane**; Deadmau5; Jenna & Julien; Loserfruit; ProfessorBroman; Shroud	**Vlogger of the Year**: **Wil Dasovich**; Alex Wassabi; iJustine; Jason Nash; Scotty Sire; Todd Smith
**Best YouTube Comedian**: **dangmattsmith**; Anwar Jibawi; Brandon Rogers; Danny Gonzalez; Rudy Mancuso; Tana Mongeau	**Best YouTube Ensemble**: **Vlog Squad**; De'arra & Ken; Dolan Twins; Dude Perfect; Niki and Gabi; Sugar Pine 7
**Best YouTube Musician**: **Kurt Hugo Schneider**; 80 Fitz; Brooklyn & Bailey; Our Last Night; The Filharmonic; Vidya Vox	**YouTuber of the Year**: **Jack Douglass**; David Dobrik; Gabbie Hanna; Juanpa Zurita; Lele Pons; Safiya Nygaard

=== Tech & Innovation ===
**Best in Activism**: **Erica Garner**; America Ferrera; Deray McKesson; Kailash Satyarthi; Tarana Burke; Xiuhtezcatl Roske-Martinez	**Best in Education**: **CrashCourse**; Leland Melvin; Meet Arnold; Primitive Technology; The School of Life; Tom Scott
**Best in Gaming**: **DashieGames**; Airforceproud95; Gaming Historian; ItsFunneh; PushingUpRoses; runJDrun	**Best Podcast**: **VIEWS**; Leland Melvin; Lady Lovin; Oprah's SuperSoul Conversations; Pod Save America; S Town
**Best in Travel**: **Kara and Nate**; Damon and Jo; Exploring with Josh; Fly with Stella; Juan-Peter Schulze; She is Not Lost	
