= Nyma =

Nyma or NYMA may refer to:

== People ==
- Nyma Akashat Zibiri, Nigerian lawyer and television host
- Nyma Tang, American beauty vlogger

== Other ==
- New York Military Academy
- New York metropolitan area
