= Plateau de Beille =

French ski resort

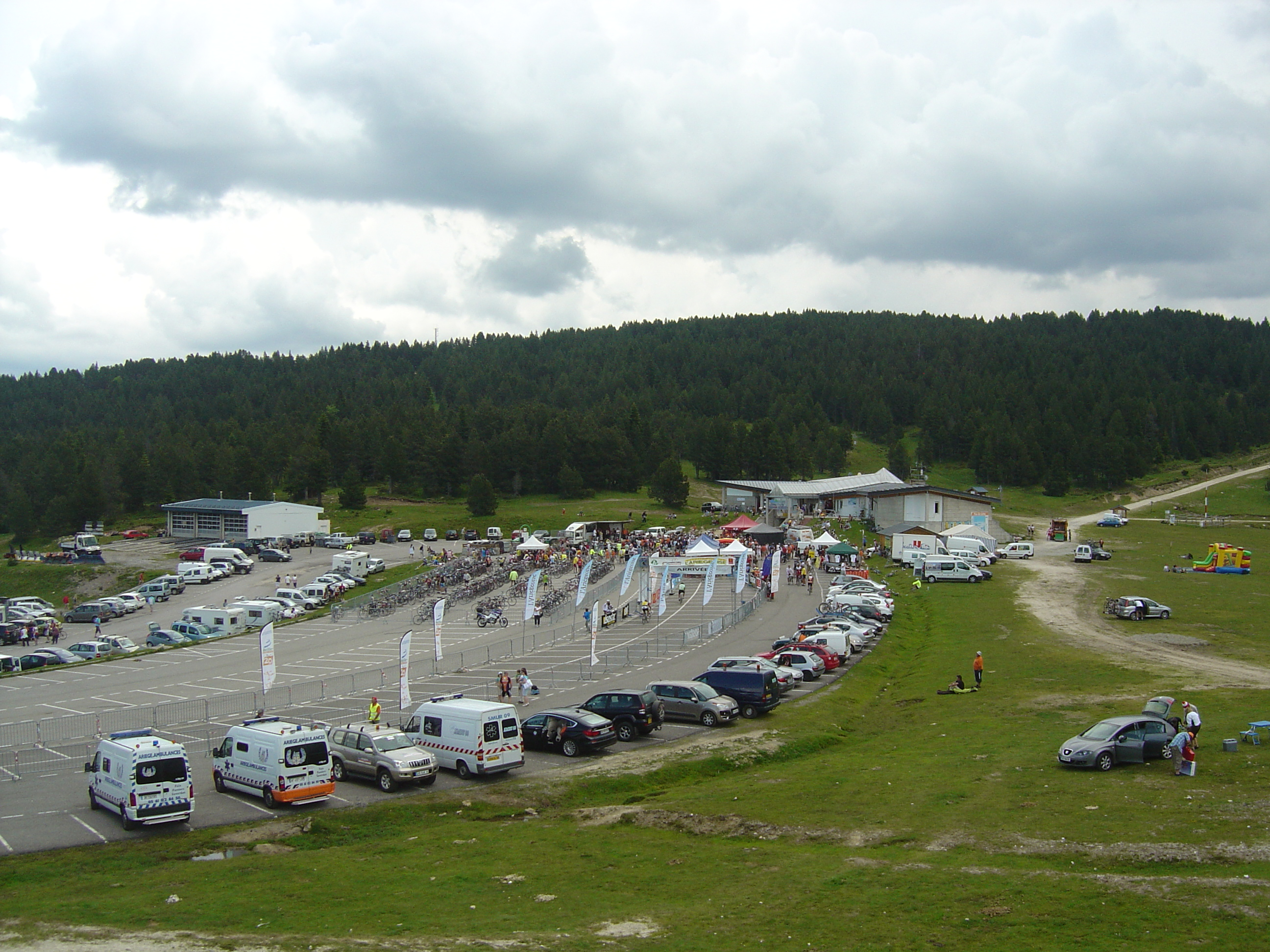

- Location within France Location within Occitanie Location within Pyrenees
- Location: Ariège, Occitanie, France
- Nearest city: Andorra la Vella
- Coordinates: 42°43′31.2″N 1°41′27.15″E
- Top elevation: 2,000 m (6,600 ft)
- Base elevation: 1,650 m (5,410 ft)
- Skiable area: 70 km (43 mi)
- Trails: Black: 2, 21 km (13 mi); Red: 5, 32.3 km (20.1 mi); Blue: 5, 14 km (8.7 mi); Green: 1, 1 km (0.62 mi)
- Website: www.beille.fr

Plateau de Beille (French pronunciation: [plato də bɛj]; Occitan: Plan de Belha) is a ski resort in the Pyrenees. It is situated in the Ariège department, and in the region of the Occitanie. The winter sports resort lies at a height of 1,790 m (5,870 ft).

For a long time, this plateau was only a place of livestock, especially cattle. It has recently become the site of a large winter sports resort of the Pyrenees, mainly dedicated to the practice of cross-country skiing, with tracks between 1,650 and 2,000 metres (5,410 and 6,560 ft) altitude. The ski station is located between Tarascon-sur-Ariège and Ax-les-Thermes, close to the Spanish border, and above the communes of Les Cabannes, Albiès and Vèbre. Road access to the plateau (the D522) starts from Les Cabannes. Moreover, the Plateau de Beille is a crossing point of the GR 10 hiking trail that crosses the Pyrenees from east to west.

Since 1998, the ascent from Les Cabannes to the plateau has regularly been used as the final ascent of a stage in the Tour de France. On the first four such occasions, the stage winner at Plateau de Beille also emerged as the winner of the general classification of that Tour.

== Geography ==
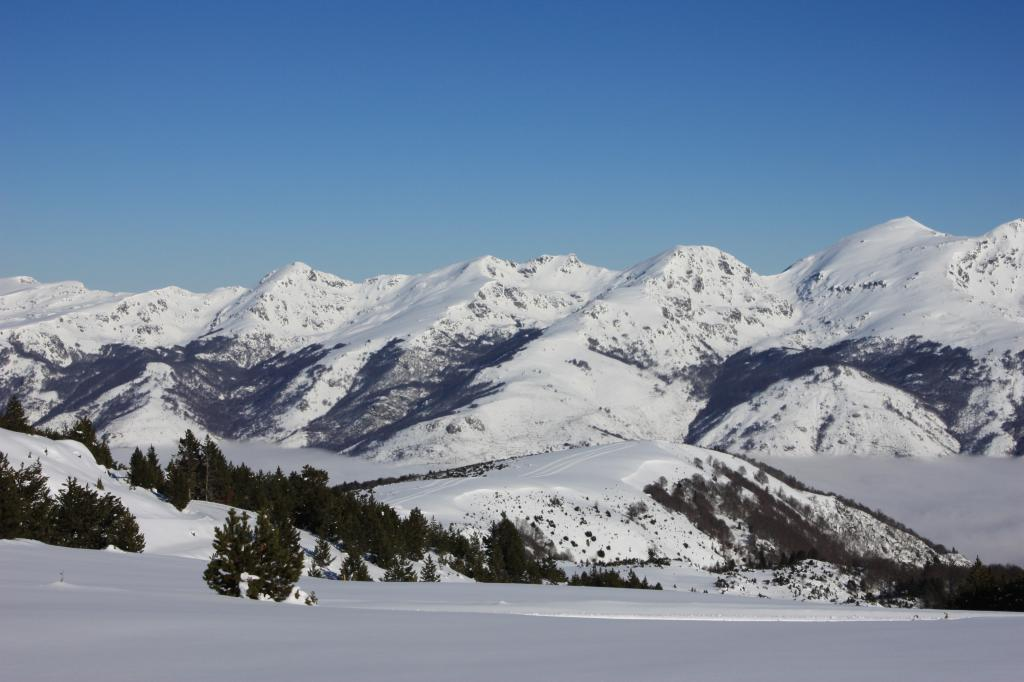
Plateau de Beille covered in snow

The Plateau de Beille is bounded by two tributaries of the Ariège Valley, these being the Aston to the west, and the Labail stream to the east. The plateau ends at the south by the Col de Finestres at 1,967 metres (6,453 ft) where it passes the GR 10; to the north, the slope falls steeply to the Ariège Valley.

If one considers the whole delimited area, it has benches with an altitude approximately between 1,700–2,000 metres (5,600–6,600 ft), on an area of about 1,450 hectares (3,600 acres).

=== Geology ===
The substrate of the plateau is essentially composed of gneiss (gneiss of Riète or Aston), i.e. a granite metamorphosed by plutonic lifts. Formed during the Cenozoic, it suffered a first uprising during the formation of the Pyrenees about 40 to 50 million years ago, various levels between 25 million years and 10 million years ago, then a new uprising. In the Quaternary, its perimeter was determined by deep glacial valleys.

=== Flora and fauna ===
The Plateau de Beille is a Zone naturelle d'intérêt écologique, faunistique et floristique [Natural Zone of Ecological Interest, Fauna and Flora] (ZNIEFF) type I. Its habitat consists of short lawns, forests of Pinus uncinata at altitude, a beech-fir forest on its lower slopes, moorland and some bogs. In the bogs are oblong-leaved sundew (Drosera intermedia), round-leaved sundew (Drosera rotundifolia) and bog club moss (Lycopodiella inundata), rare and protected species, but also the marsh cinquefoil (Comarum palustre) and tussock cottongrass (Eriophorum vaginatum).

With regard to wildlife, of particular note is the presence of the capercaillie, the golden eagle, the bearded vulture and, for mammals, the European pine marten (Martes martes) and the Pyrenean chamois.

== Sport ==
=== Ski resort ===
Created in 1988, the Plateau de Beille Nordic ski resort was opened in 1989. The facilities include 70 kilometres (43 mi) of cross-country trails, 42 kilometres (26 mi) of snowshoe trails, a biathlon stadium and a school for dog sledding. In summer activities are organised for, among other things, scooters hauled by sled dogs and discovery walks concerning pastoralism. Mountain biking trails follow the route of the cross-country ski slopes. It is a daytime station, with the exception of bivouacs in light structures, which have been implemented from 2007, no accommodation is guaranteed.

With regard to attendance and turnover, in 2008 Beille was the first Nordic ski station in the Pyrenees and the 4th at the French level. For winter 2011, the station recorded 128 days of operations that generated the sale of about 64,667 Nordic days for a turnover of €440,334.

Management is performed by the Régie des Espaces Nordiques des Vallées d'Ax (RENVA) under the tutelage of the Communauté de communes des Vallées d'Ax. The station is a partner with its neighbours of Ax 3 Domaines, Le Chioula and Ascou-Pailhères.

=== Cycling ===
Plateau de Beille
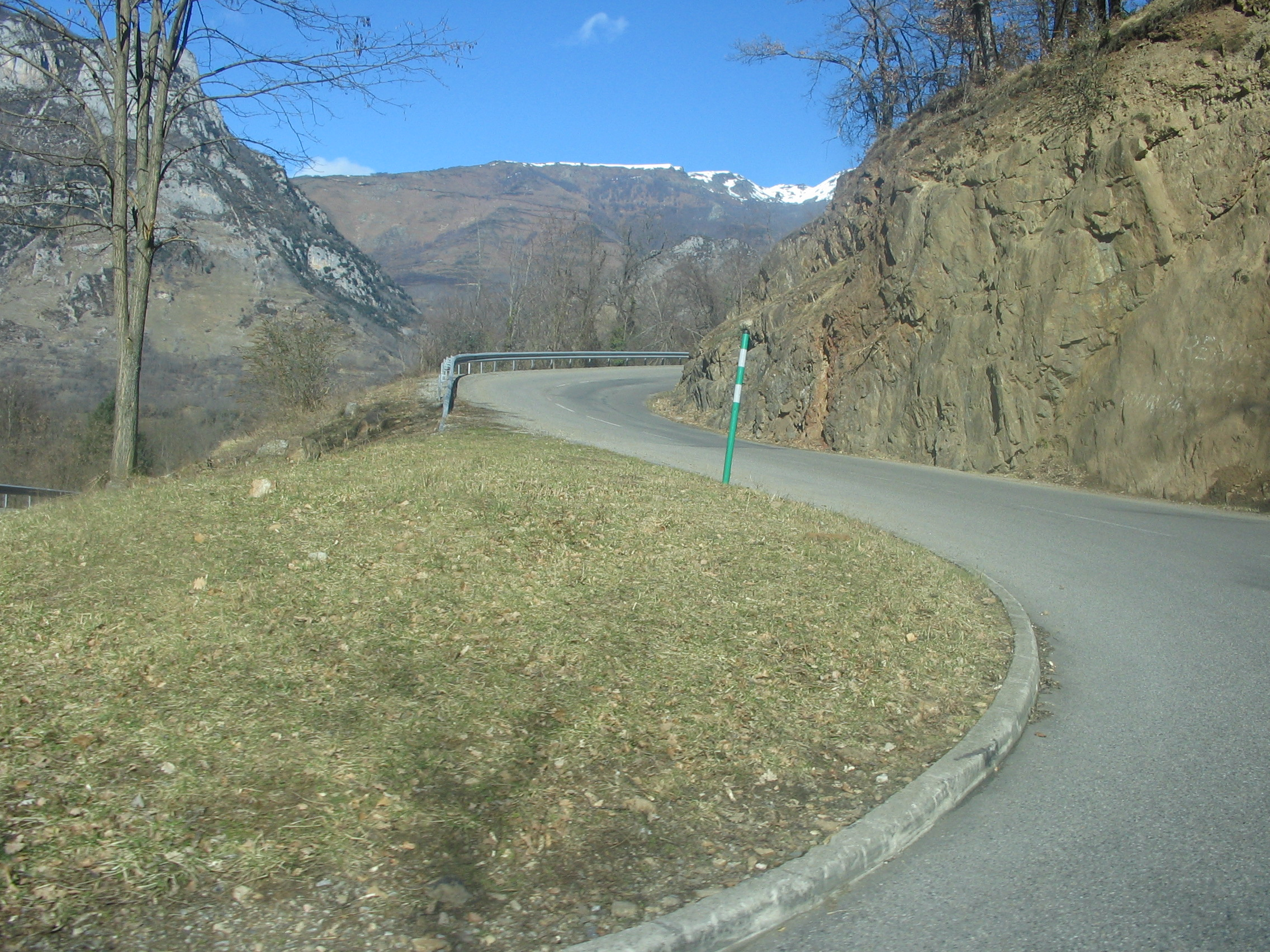
- Start of the climb shortly after Les Cabannes
- Start: Les Cabannes, Ariège
- Gain in altitude: 1,255 m (4,117 ft)
- Length of climb: 15.9 km (9.9 mi)
- Maximum elevation: 1,790 m (5,870 ft)
- Average gradient: 7.9 %
- Maximum gradient: 10.8 %

The Plateau de Beille is a regular place of various races. It was discovered by the Route du Sud in 1995, followed by the Tour de France in 1998, and every other year constitutes the final mountain for the cyclists of the L'Ariégeoise.

==== Details of climb ====
Starting from Les Cabannes at 535 m (1,755 ft), the climb to the Plateau de Beille at 1,790 m (5,870 ft) is 15.8 km (9.8 mi) long. Over this distance, the climb is 1,255 m (4,117 ft) at an average gradient of 7.9%. The maximum gradient is 10.8%.

It is a formidable ascent. The first 12 kilometres (7.5 mi) are generally done under forest canopy and the last 4 kilometres (2.5 mi) are uncovered through the pastures, where cattle sometimes cross the road.

While the valley roads are virtually flat, as soon as leaving the central square of Les Cabannes, riders face a very steep ramp to arrive at the height of the Château de Gudanes (commune of Château-Verdun). During the first kilometres, the tar road surface is smooth but then becomes granular, which adds to the difficulty. The forest offers very little respite, the slope is high and regular with many hairpins and it is during the 6th kilometre where it is possible to traverse a flat section of about 400 metres (1,300 ft). The percentages are often higher than 8%; the 9th kilometre, preceding Henry IV fountain, is one of the steepest sections.

After leaving the forest, the percentages are slightly lower but more irregular. At the 12th kilometre, it passes the Cabanne de Pierrefite with a short flat part followed by a difficult break in gradient. After having crossed a hairpin a little further up the road, the final section offers a moderate slope and the finish takes place at the large car park outside the building of the ski station, at an altitude of 1,790 metres (5,870 ft).

==== Tour de France ====
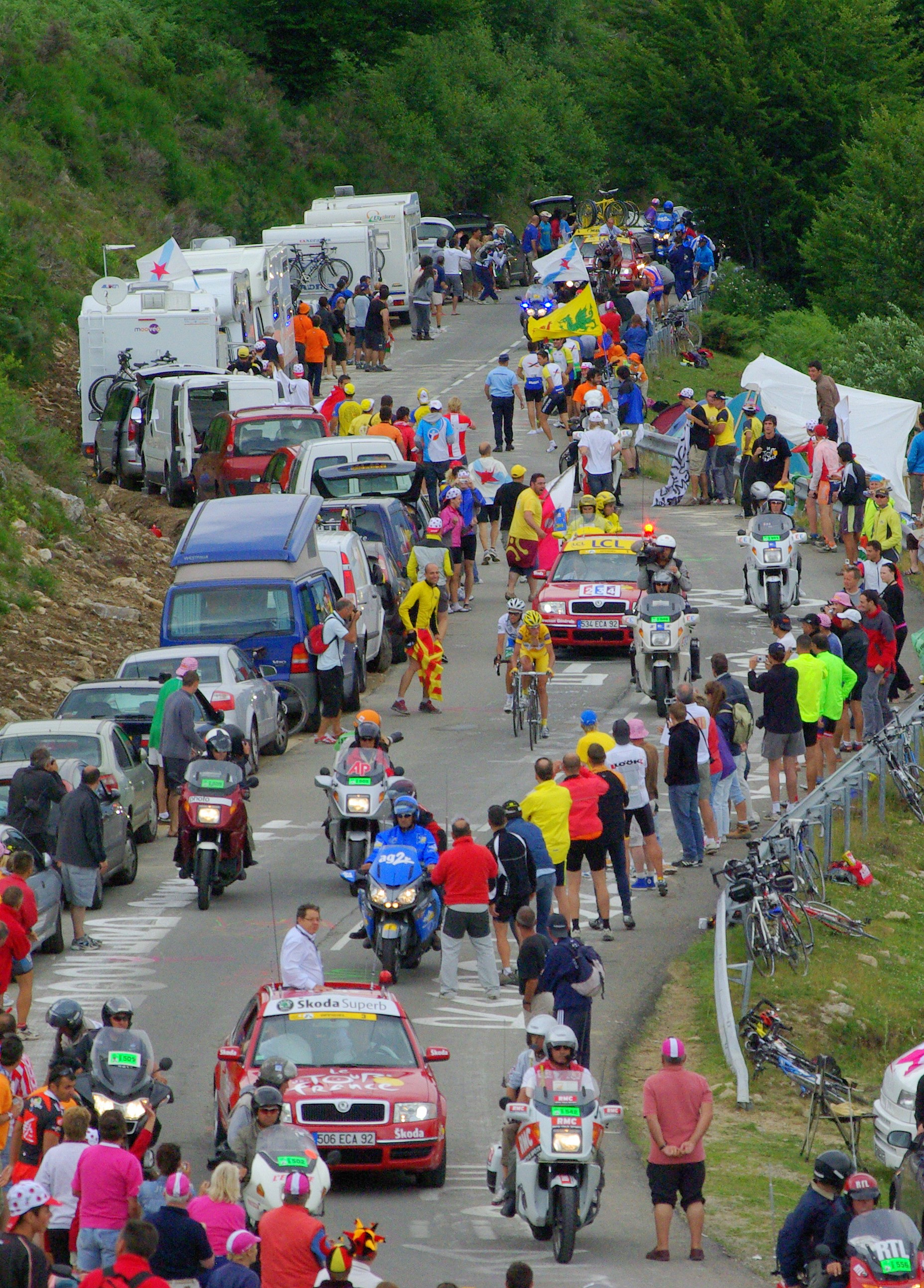
The yellow jersey arriving during the Tour de France 2007

Since its discovery by the Tour de France in 1998, the Plateau de Beille has served as stage finish seven times (in 1998, 2002, 2004, 2007, 2011, 2015 and 2024). The ascent is ranked as hors catégorie in the mountains classification.

On the first four occasions, the stage winner has gone on to win the Tour: Marco Pantani in 1998, Lance Armstrong in 2002 and 2004 (but whose titles were removed from him in October 2012), and Alberto Contador in 2007 who won the Tour de France as a result of the exclusion of the Danish Michael Rasmussen.

==== Tour de France stage finishes ====
Year	Stage	Start of stage	Distance (km)	Category of climb	Stage winner	Yellow jersey
2024	15	Loudenvielle	197.7	HC	Tadej Pogačar (SLO)	Tadej Pogačar (SLO)
2015	12	Lannemezan	195	HC	Joaquim Rodríguez (ESP)	Chris Froome (GBR)
2011	14	Saint-Gaudens	168.5	HC	Jelle Vanendert (BEL)	Thomas Voeckler (FRA)
2007	14	Mazamet	170	HC	Alberto Contador (ESP)	Michael Rasmussen (DEN)
2004	13	Lannemezan	205.5	HC	Lance Armstrong (USA)	Thomas Voeckler (FRA)
2002	12	Lannemezan	198	HC	Lance Armstrong (USA)	
1998	11	Bagnères-de-Luchon	170	HC	Marco Pantani (ITA)	Jan Ullrich (GER)

*The 1998 Tour de France finish was at 1,747 m (5,732 ft) whereas in later years the finish has been at 1,780 m (5,840 ft).

==== Route du Sud ====
The Plateau de Beille has also been used seven times for a stage finish of the Route du Sud.

- 1995: (Spain) Carmelo Mirando
- 1996: (Italy) Giuseppe Guerini
- 1997: (France) Laurent Roux
- 1998: (France) Armand de Las Cuevas
- 1999: (United States) ~~Lance Armstrong~~
- 2001: (Italy) Francesco Casagrande
- 2002: (United States) Levi Leipheimer (ITT)

== Gallery ==
The climb of Plateau de Beille

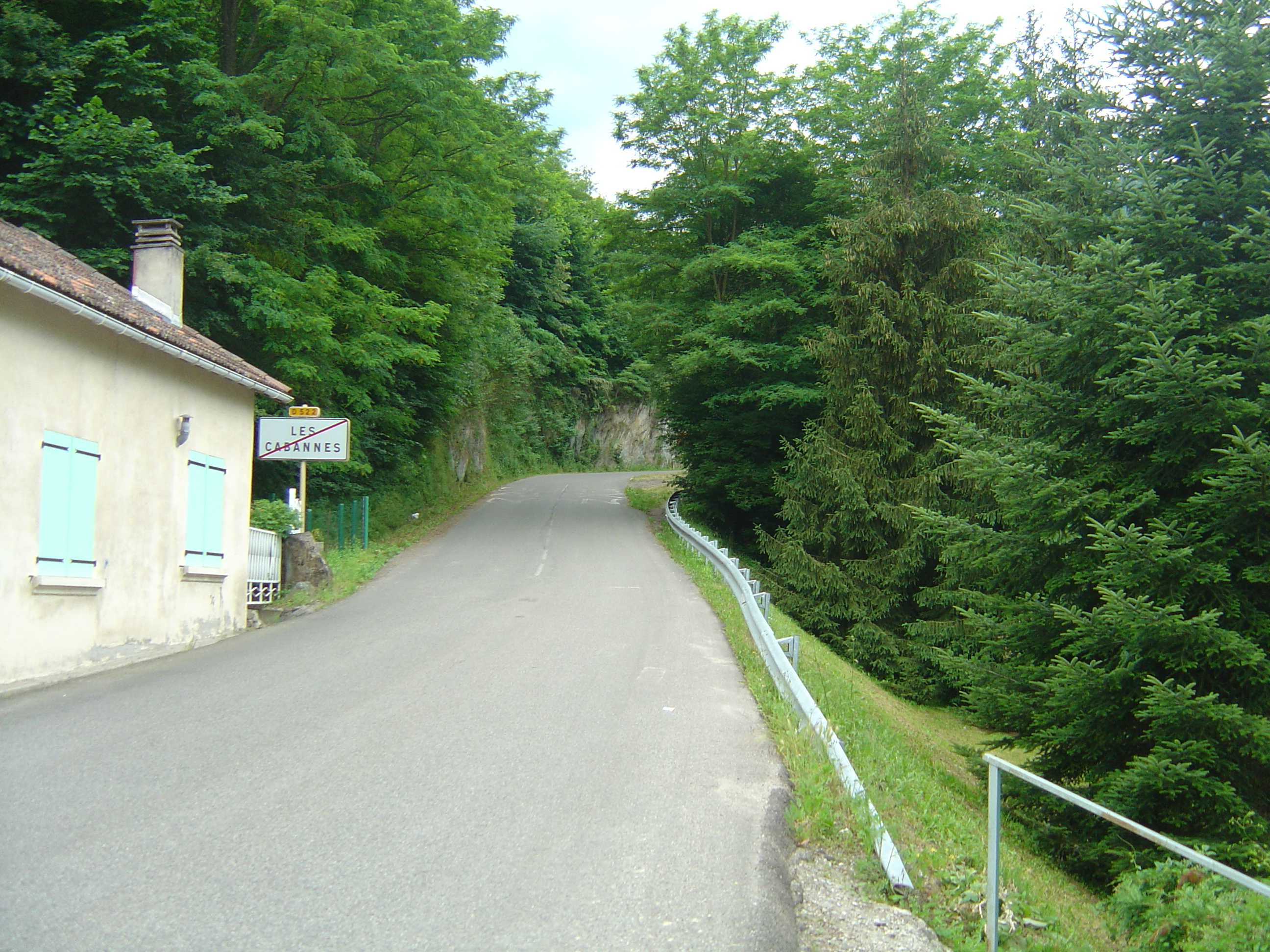
Difficult slope from the rise on leaving Les Cabannes

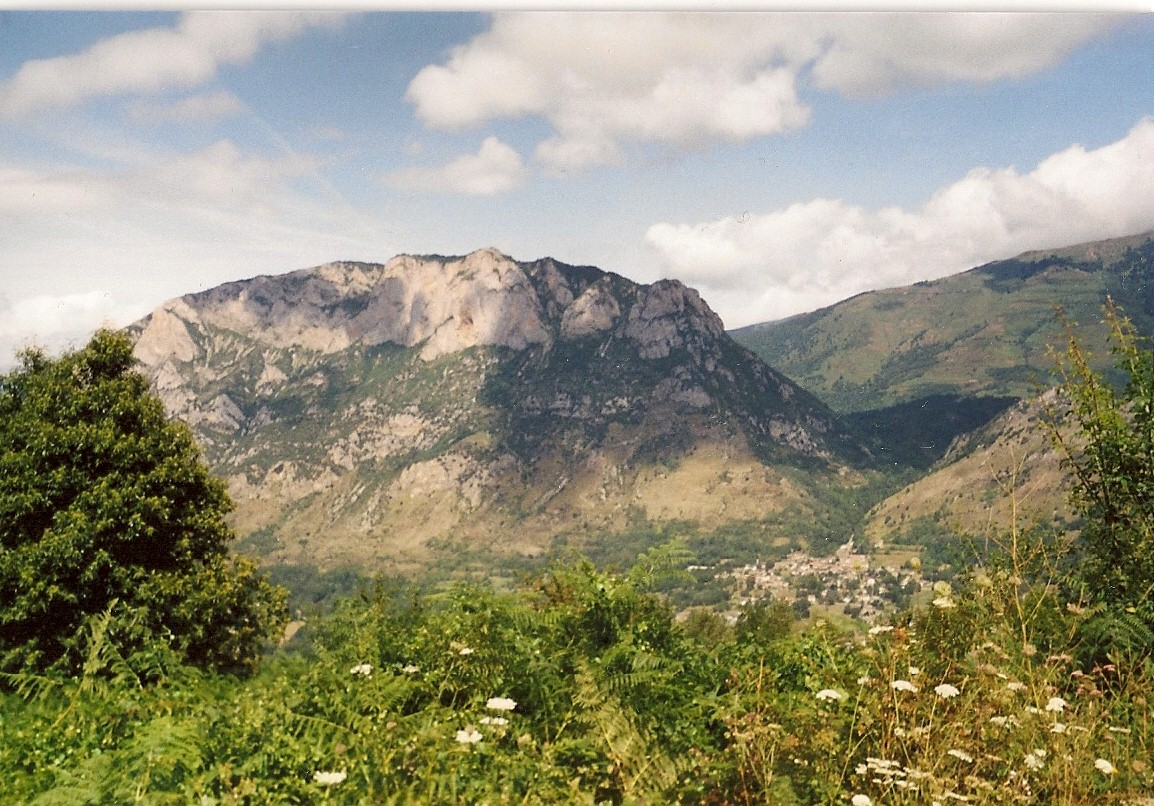
The mountain of Quié de Sinsat at 1,484 metres (4,869 ft)

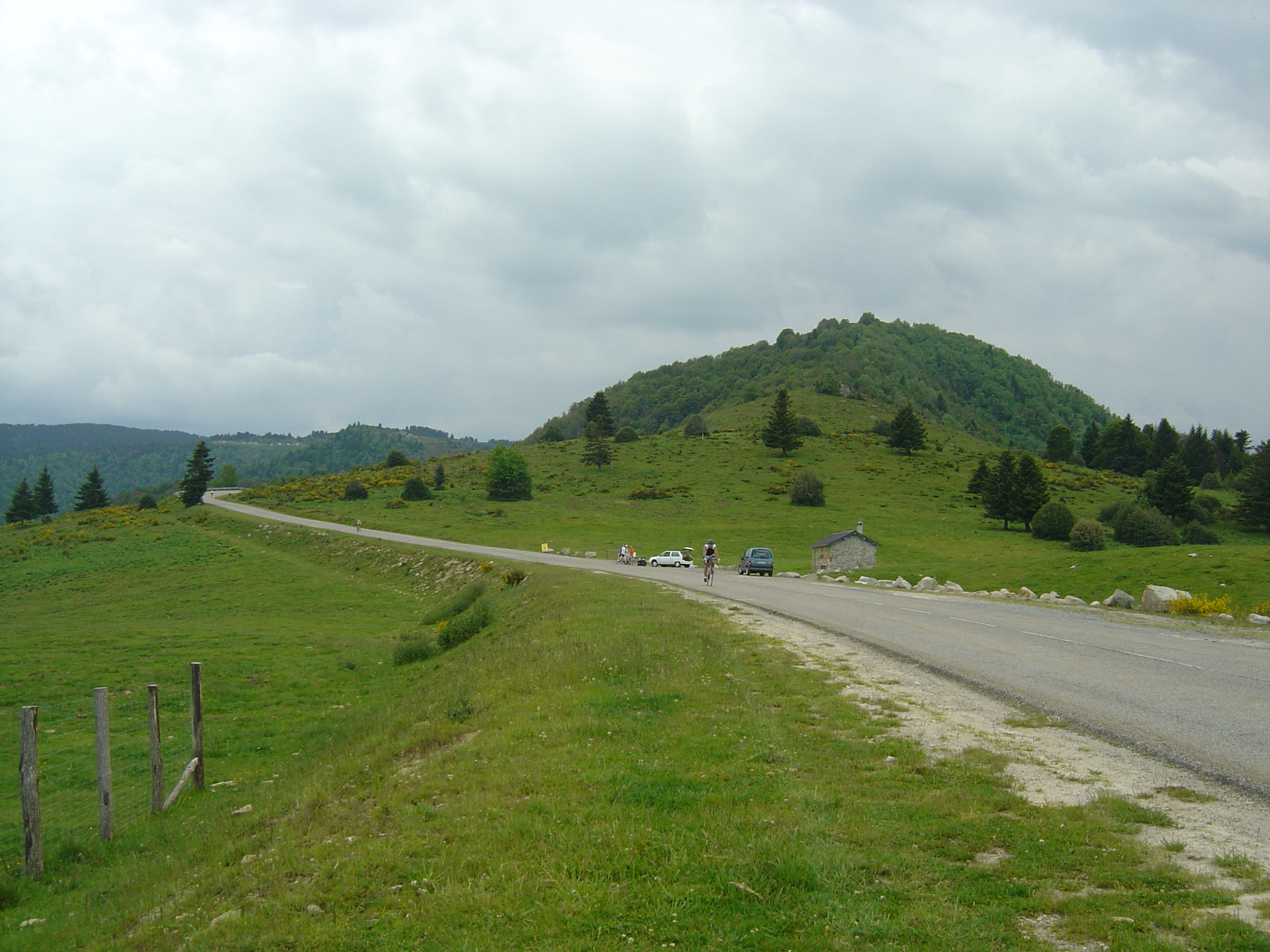
The Pierrefite cabin to the right, 4 kilometres (2.5 mi) from the finish

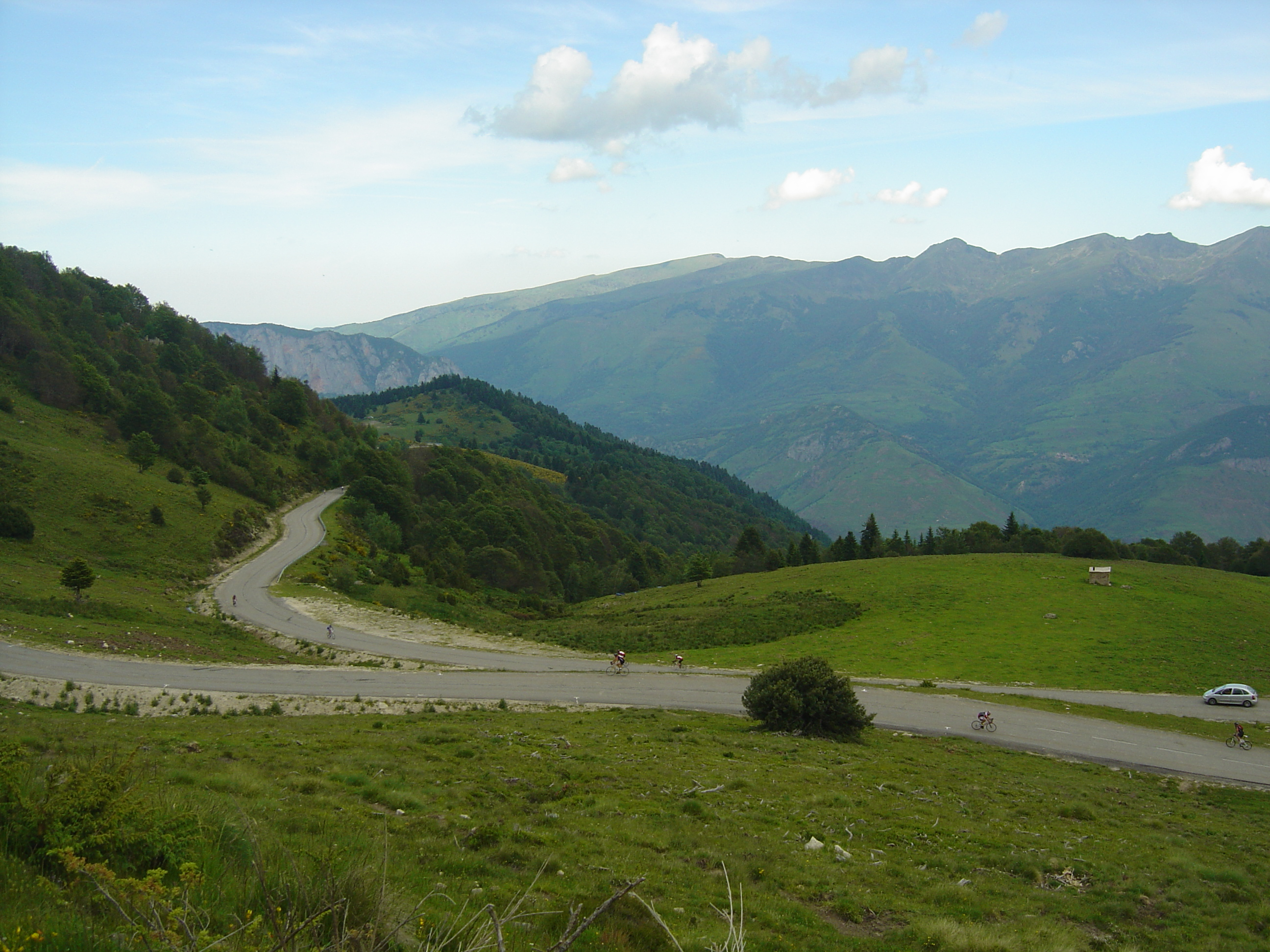
The hairpin turn at 2.5 kilometres (1.6 mi) from the finish

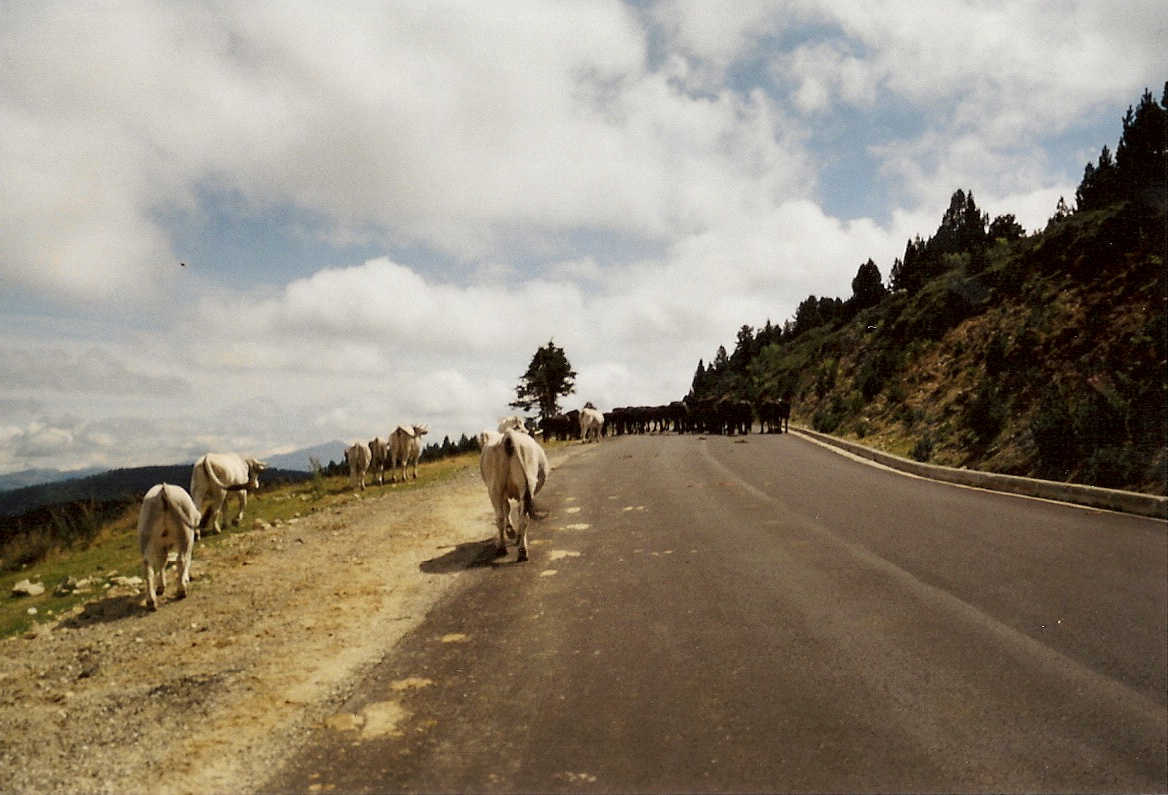
Cattle and horses on the road at 1 kilometre (0.62 mi) from the finish

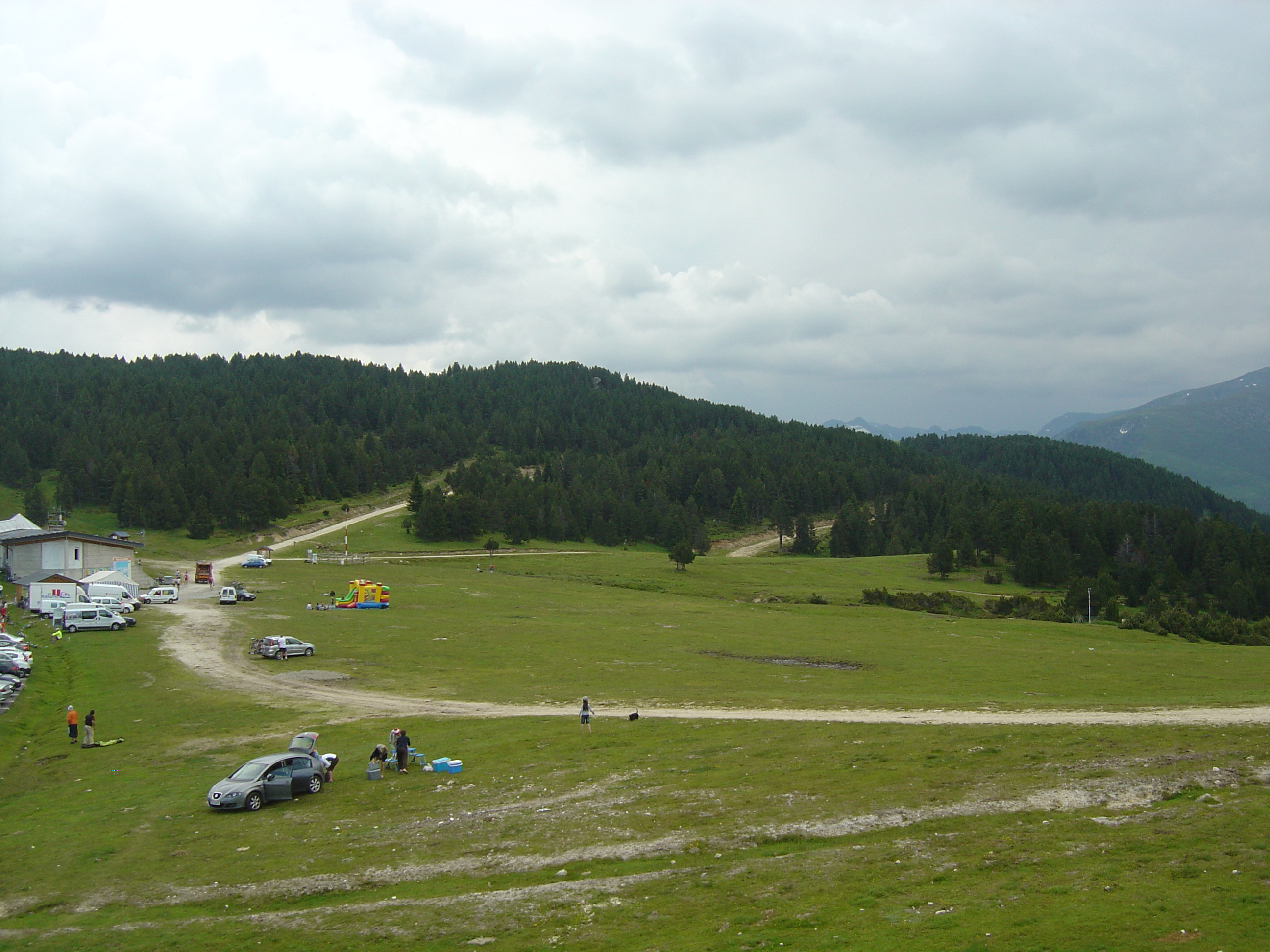
The start of the ski slopes

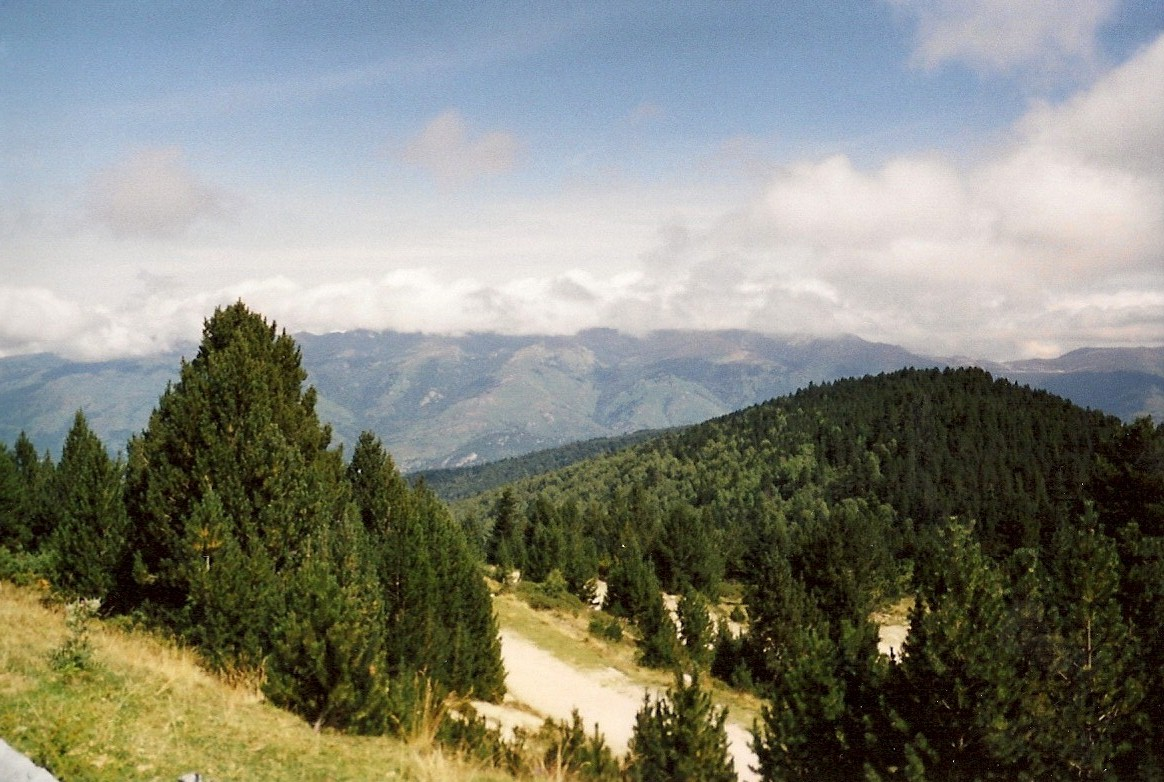
View north to the Montagne de la Tabe

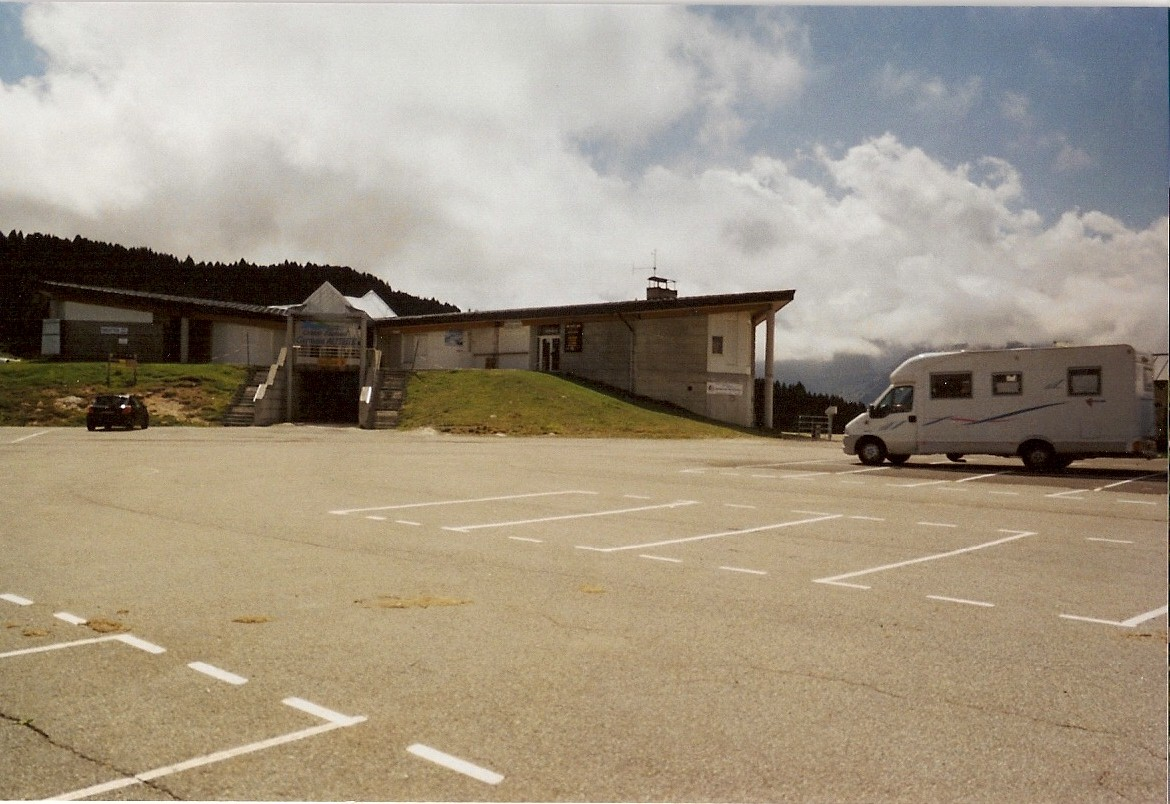
Restaurant at the finish next to the large car park

== See also ==
- List of winter sports stations in the Pyrenees
- List of cols of the Pyrenees
- 2007 Tour de France, stage 14
- 2011 Tour de France, stage 14

== Bibliography ==
=== General ===
- Dessarps, Pierre-Damien (July 2008). "Du plan de gestion environnementale au plan de développement territorial : l'exemple original du plateau de Beille en Pyrénées ariègeoises" [From the environmental management plan to the territorial development plan: The original example of the Plateau de Beille in the Ariege Pyrenees] (pdf) (in French). Paris: Institut des sciences et industries du vivant et de l'environnement. Mémoire de fin d'études.

=== Cycling ===
- "Le Plateau de Beille. Le Juge de Paix". Le Cycle (367): 64–68. September 2007.
- "Plateau de Beille. La montée du sacre". Le Cycle. hors-série (506H): 102–104. July 2005.

GR footpath: GR 10
Previous stop		Following stop
Mérens-les-Vals	Plateau de Beille	Gestiès
