= Maurice-Marie-Matthieu Garrigou =

French Roman Catholic priest

Venerable Maurice-Marie-Matthieu Garrigou
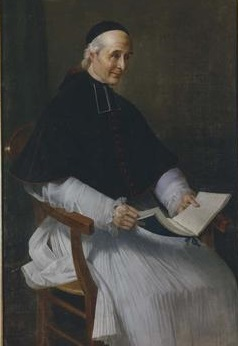

Priest
- Born: 21 September 1766; Gudanes, Ariège, France
- Died: 27 September 1852 (aged 86); Toulouse, Haute-Garonne, France
- Venerated in: Roman Catholic Church
- Attributes: Cassock; Zucchetto

Maurice-Marie-Matthieu Garrigou (21 September 1766 – 27 September 1852) was a French Roman Catholic priest who established the Sisters of Our Lady of Compassion. He served in the priesthood during the tumultuous French Revolution.

Pope Francis approved his life of heroic virtue and bestowed upon him the title of Venerable. A miracle attributed to him is now under investigation for his beatification.

== Life ==
Maurice-Marie-Matthieu Garrigou was born on 21 September 1766 in the commune of Château-Verdun, France. His was born to Jean-Baptiste Garrigou and Catherine Fauré. His mother concerned herself with the education if the eight children. Garrigou was ten when his mother died.

At the age of eighteen he pursued his studies but decided to become a priest. He commenced his studies for the priesthood in 1784. The French Revolution started at the end of the decade. He was ordained to the priesthood in December 1790 and celebrated his first mass on Christmas Eve. He said of that mass: "I felt that I was covered with the precious blood of Jesus Christ".

Garrigou spent long hours in solitude and would meditate before the crucifix of Christ. His pain of the cross came in the form of the French Revolution and its consequences. In light of the revolution he made it his goal to evangelize the population as part of his pastoral mission as a priest. He established the Sisters of Our Lady of Compassion in 1817.

He died in 1852 in France.

== Beatification process ==
The beatification process opened in France on 12 March 1954. The Congregation for the Causes of Saints decreed the cause to reopen on 6 March 2001 and the ratification of the local process was signed on 22 June 2001. It resulted in the submission of the Positio – documentation on his life of heroic virtue – in 2001.

Pope Francis declared that he did indeed live a life of heroic virtue and bestowed upon him the title of Venerable on 9 December 2013.

A miracle attributed to his intercession was investigated and was ratified on 2 June 2007.
