= Gaming Historian =

YouTube channel

- YouTube channel logo Caruso at TooManyGames 2017
- Born: Norman Caruso; Okinawa, Japan

YouTube information
- Channel: GamingHistorian
- Years active: 2008–2026
- Genre: Documentaries
- Subscribers: 1.1 million
- Views: 151 million
- Last updated: October 16, 2026

Gaming Historian is a YouTube channel created by Norman Caruso. Known for its extended documentary-style looks at topics related to historic video games, Gaming Historian posted new videos from 2008 until 2026.

== History ==
Gaming Historian is known for what PC Gamer called "Ken Burns-style documentary videos" about video games, including history, hardware, and legal cases. Topics covered on the channel have included The Oregon Trail, a television that had a Super Famicom built into it, the Sega Mega Modem, the first-ever video game cartridge, and the history behind the Nintendo Entertainment System.

At its peak, the channel had over a million followers. A local news outlet in 2022 posited that the channel's popularity came from viewers' connection with its longform documentary style, as the videos "pull on a nostalgia from video game enthusiasts of a certain age that keeps them coming back".

Caruso posted videos to the channel frequently for over a decade starting in 2008. (Note: As of 2026, the oldest video on the channel is from 2009.) He reduced his involvement to part-time in 2024 after releasing a particularly work-intensive look into the Oregon Trail series. Two years later, Caruso stepped away from the Gaming Historian, citing concerns with burn out.

Gaming Historian was also a finalist in the gaming category at the 10th Shorty Awards.

=== Universal v. Nintendo documents ===
Beginning in 2024, Caruso released National Archives and Records Administration–held court documents from Universal City Studios, Inc. v. Nintendo Co., Ltd., a 1982 case where the former alleged that the latter had effectively copied King Kong in creating Donkey Kong. When he stepped back from the YouTube channel in 2026, he uploaded all of the documents to the Internet Archive for anyone to view.

=== Podcast ===
Caruso co-hosts An Old Timey Podcast, a history-themed podcast, with his wife Kristin. Following the retirement of the Gaming Historian channel, An Old Timey Podcast issued a two-part episode about the Donkey Kong case in April 2026 using the Nintendo court documents.

== Personal life ==
Caruso was born in Okinawa, Japan, to a military family. As of 2022, he lived in Kansas City, Missouri.
