= Elle Mills =

Canadian Director/Former YouTuber (born 1998)

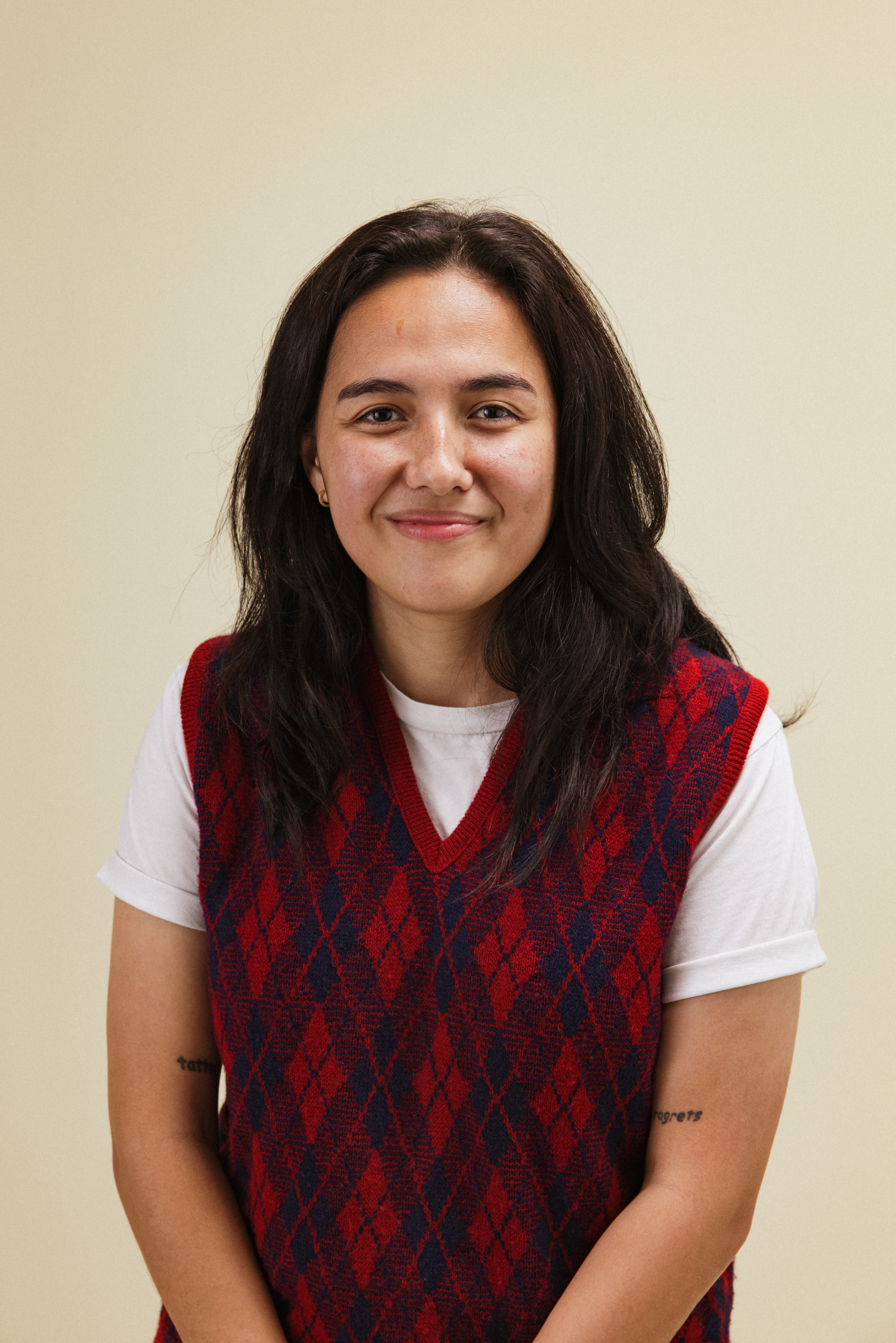
- Mills in 2022
- Born: Elle Janette Mills; July 17, 1998 (age 27); Manila, Philippines
- Spouse: Mitch Azevedo (m. 2017; ann. 2018)

YouTube information
- Channel: ElleOfTheMills
- Years active: 2012–2022
- Subscribers: 1.66 million
- Views: 84.2 million
- Last updated: December 28, 2025

Elle Janette Mills (born July 17, 1998), also known by her YouTube username ElleOfTheMills, is a Philippine-born Canadian former YouTube vlogger. She won the "Breakout YouTuber" category at the 10th Shorty Awards in 2018. Her videos have been compared to the films of John Hughes. In 2023, she announced in her New York Times essay that she has taken a step back from YouTube and is now pursuing writing and directing full-time.

== Family and early life ==
Mills was born on July 18, 1998, in Manila, Philippines, and raised in the Canadian National Capital Region. She began making home videos when she was eight years old. In high school, she was inspired to become a YouTuber by watching the YouTube videos of Grace Helbig and Casey Neistat. Her family appears in many of her videos, her mother's name is Janette Prejola and her younger brother's name is Jay Mills.

== YouTube career ==
At the beginning of 2017, she had about 15,000 subscribers on YouTube. Her channel gained subscribers very quickly after her coming-of-age videos went viral later that year. In particular, her November 2017 coming out video, in which she came out as bisexual, pushed her over the million-subscriber mark.

Mills signed with Fullscreen in June 2017, and they produced her first ever tour in the spring of 2018. By the end of 2017, her channel had over 915,000 subscribers, and she surpassed 1 million subscribers in February 2018. That May, she had a mental breakdown and posted a video announcing that she would take a break from making new videos. She returned to YouTube a month later. She signed with United Talent Agency in December 2018.

In 2023, Mills announced in her New York Times essay that she had taken a step back from YouTube and is now pursuing writing and directing full-time.

As of December 2025, Mills has released two coming-of-age short films on her YouTube channel, REPLY and Don't Forget About Me.
