= Nabela Noor =

American YouTuber

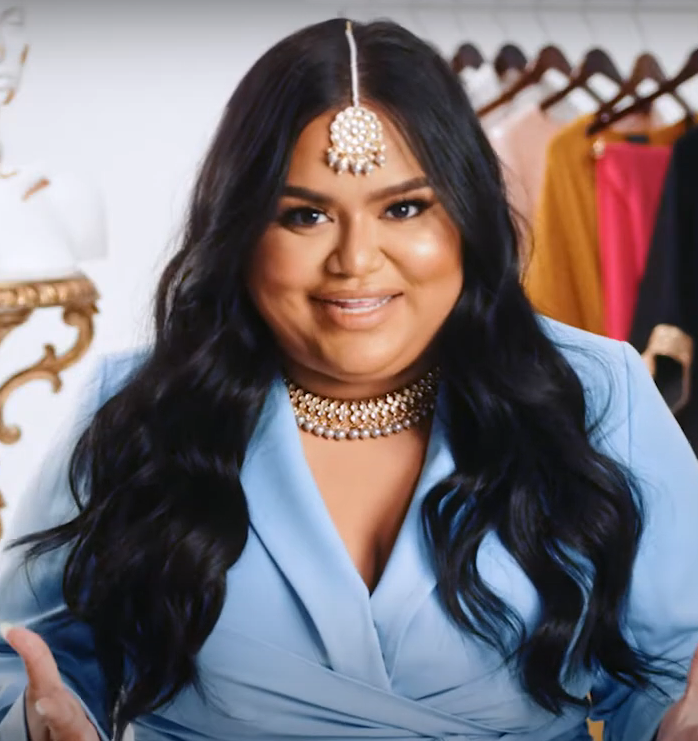
- Noor in 2020
- Born: Nabela Mohamed; August 4, 1991 (age 35); New York, United States
- Occupations: Businesswoman, social media personality
- Spouse: Seth Martin (m. 2015)
- Children: 2
- Website: https://www.nabelanoor.com/

Nabela Noor Martin (née Mohamed) born August 4, 1991) is an American businesswoman and social media personality. Noor is known for her YouTube channel where she shares make-up tutorials, product reviews on cosmetics, and vlogs about beauty.

== Early life ==
Mohamed was born on August 4, 1991, in New York, United States to Bangladeshi immigrant parents Zeba and Rana Mohamed. She completed high school at the age of 16, before attending a community college. She then transferred to Pennsylvania State University and acquired a degree in sociology.

== Career ==
Mohamed started her YouTube channel in 2013 when she felt a lack of diversity and representation of plus-size people in the mainstream media and beauty industry. The content in her channel surrounds topics such as beauty, self-care, fashion, lifestyle, cooking, and homemaking. She produces a TikTok series called Pocket of Peace, that focuses on celebrating little moments. Through her content across various social platforms, she advocates for ideas such as self-love, acceptance and self-care.

In a video posted to Instagram on December 31, 2017, Mohamed used contouring cream to write derogatory words such as "pig" and "ugly" on her face. The video was intended as a response to societal labels and served as a statement promoting her personal message of self-love and empowerment.

In 2021, she launched PÜR xo Nabela, a collaboration with cosmetic brand PÜR.

== Personal life ==
Mohamed met Seth Martin in college during her senior year, where they worked at the York Mall together. Mohamed and Seth married in 2015 and currently reside in York, Pennsylvania. Mohamed became pregnant in June 2021 but had a miscarriage at six weeks pregnant. They later had a daughter named Amalia Rana, and a second daughter soon after, named Aveena.

In August 2024, Noor spoke at the 2024 Democratic National Convention, endorsing Vice President Kamala Harris for president. She is known as an activist and her pro-Palestine stance.
