= Nyma Akashat Zibiri =

Nigerian lawyer and television host

Nihmatallah Akashat Zibiri, known as Nyma, is a Nigerian lawyer and television host. She is co-host on TVC's daytime show Your View.

== Life ==
She graduated in law from Lagos University, and was called to the Nigerian Bar.

A practicing Muslim, Nihmatallah Akashat has declared that "My hijab is my identity". She was inspired to go into television by wanting to increase Muslim representation in broadcasting. Having watched Your View since its inception, she applied and was hired after the show advertised for a Muslim co-host.

Akashat Zibri continues to practise law. In 2016 she co-founded a law firm, Cynosure Practice barristers and solicitors, where she is a managing partner.

In 2019 she controversially defended child marriage as preferable to premarital sex:

The act is not necessarily 'Islamic'. But when sexual urges start to come, one of the best alternatives is to allow them to get married [...] If my daughter wants to marry at a young age, I would first have the necessary conversations with her to see if it is truly what she wants and also ensure that she is fit to some extent, but I wouldn’t stop her.
