= Nyma Tang =

American beauty YouTuber

- Born: Gambela, Ethiopia
- Occupation: Beauty YouTuber

YouTube information
- Channel: Nyma Tang
- Genres: Vlog; makeup; beauty
- Subscribers: 1.3 million
- Views: 170 million
- Last updated: 23 Apr 2026

Nyma Tang (/ˈnimə ˈtæŋ/) is an American beauty YouTuber. She gained online popularity in 2017 for her YouTube series The Darkest Shade, in which she reviews the darkest shades of products from different makeup brands and highlights the under-representation of deeper skin tones in the beauty industry.

== Early life ==
Tang was born in Ethiopia to South Sudanese parents; her native language is Nuer. She is the oldest of seven sisters and her family moved to the US when she was three years old. She has spoken openly about her experiences of bullying at school due to her skin colour. She started training as a nurse before dropping out at 21 to become a full time beauty vlogger.

== Career ==
Tang's interest in makeup was sparked after watching America's Next Top Model, where she saw Black women models being publicly celebrated for this first time. She started her Youtube channel when she was 25 years old and in 2017, she began recording the series The Darkest Shade, in which she reviews the darkest shades of products from different makeup brands. She uses this series and her platform to help women with darker skin tones find good matches in various makeup products, to educate people about colourism and to lobby cosmetics brands to make more inclusive shade ranges. On her channel, she has also shared her experiences with natural hair.

In 2018, Tang created her own shade of MAC Cosmetics lipstick called 'Nyma Tang'. She has collaborated on sponsored content with brands like Fenty Beauty, Bobbi Brown and Pat McGrath.

== Awards ==
Year	Title	Award	Result
2018	Shorty Awards	Best in Beauty	Won
