= James Fridman =

British graphic designer

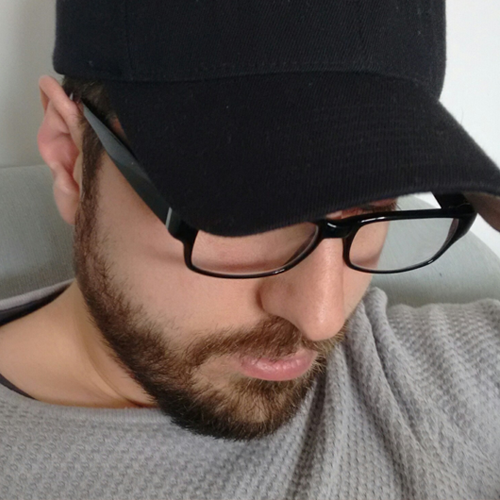
- Avatar
- Born: London, United Kingdom
- Occupation: Graphic designer
- Website: jamesfridman.com thejamesfridmanfoundation.org

James Fridman is a British graphic designer known for taking requests on X (Twitter) for alterations to photographs. He has gained widespread recognition for his humorous and unexpected alterations to images, often fulfilling requests in ways that subvert the requester's expectations. His work is characterized by a penchant for taking instructions literally and employing paraprosdokian humour to create comedic effects.

== Approach and popularity ==
Fridman's popularity stems from his willingness to engage with his audience on social media, particularly on X (Twitter). While many fans seek out Fridman's services for comedic purposes, others approach him with the hope of improving their self-image or addressing insecurities through photo editing.

One distinctive aspect of Fridman's approach is his refusal to conform to conventional standards of beauty or perfection. Instead of fulfilling requests to alter physical attributes, Fridman often leaves the photos untouched and delivers a positive message encouraging self-acceptance and confidence. This approach has endeared him to many fans, who appreciate his emphasis on embracing imperfections and resisting societal pressures.

== Media attention ==
Fridman's work has garnered significant media attention, with publications such as Cosmopolitan, The Daily Telegraph, MTV, Huffington Post, Metro, BuzzFeed, Mashable and others regularly featuring articles on his latest work.

In October 2016, Fridman collaborated with Truth Initiative — a public health organization dedicated to smoking cessation.

In 2017, he gave an interview to The Daily Telegraph where he spoke about his creative process, his views on digital manipulation, and his approach to humour.

In January 2018, he was nominated for Shorty Awards in the "Weird" category.

He established the James Fridman Foundation in December 2018 with a mission to help and support children and young people affected by social issues.

In March 2019, Fridman collaborated with Bumble to support the criminalization of unsolicited lewd photos, a campaign led by CEO Whitney Wolfe Herd.

In 2022 Fridman collaborated with Netflix Is A Joke on a comedy sketch featuring Taylor Tomlinson, where James upgraded her social media content – with unexpected results

In November 2023 Fridman partnered with Maybelline on a campaign promoting a brand new Instant Age Rewind Eraser Concealer.
