= Krew =

Group of siblings on YouTube

KREW
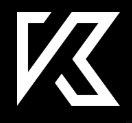
- Krew logo

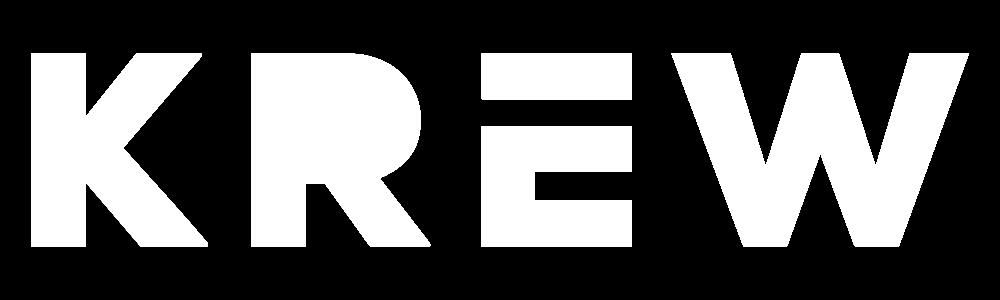
- Alt Krew logo
- Industry: Entertainment
- Genre: Gaming videos; Vlogs
- Members: Kat La (Funneh); Betty La (Rainbow); Kim La (Gold); Wenny La (Lunar); Allen La (Draco)

YouTube information
- Channel: ItsFunneh
- Years active: 2011–present
- Genre: Gaming
- Subscribers: 12 million
- Views: 15.9 billion
- Last updated: July 12, 2026
- Website: krew.net

Krew (stylized in all caps) is a group of YouTubers from Canada, best known for their gaming videos. The group consists of Kat La, Betty La, Kim La, Wenny La, and Allen La, all of whom are siblings. They have a total of 7 YouTube channels (ItsFunneh, GoldenGlare, DraconiteDragon, Lunar Eclipse, PaintingRainbows, KREW, and KREW WORLD), with ItsFunneh being the main channel. Although the channel ItsFunneh is named after Funneh, it is a group channel for all of Krew.

As of July 2026, the ItsFunneh YouTube channel has 12 million subscribers and over 15 billion views from over 3,000 videos. It was the most-viewed Canadian gaming channel in 2020 and 5th overall. Combined, all their channels have over 19 million subscribers (Note: Subscribers, broken down by channel: 12.1 million (ItsFunneh) 1.54 million (GoldenGlare) 1.47 million (DraconiteDragon) 1.29 million (Lunar Eclipse) 1.26 million (PaintingRainbows) 1.65 million (KREW) 320 thousand (KREW WORLD)) and over 16.2 billion views. (Note: Views, broken down by channel: 15.9 billion (ItsFunneh) 127 million (GoldenGlare) 85 million (DraconiteDragon) 36 million (PaintingRainbows) 20 million (Lunar Eclipse) 104 million (KREW) 17 million (KREW WORLD)) ItsFunneh has been nominated for multiple Bloxy Awards (one of which was won), a Shorty Award, and two Roblox Innovation Awards (one of which was won).

Krew's content mainly consists of gaming videos (mainly games such as Roblox, Minecraft, and others), with all 5 siblings playing the same game. They also occasionally post vlogs.

== Early life ==
All five La siblings were born in St. Albert, Alberta, Canada, to Vietnamese-Chinese immigrants. Betty, under the pseudonym Rainbow, is the eldest sibling and was born on September 10, 1992. Kim as Gold is the second eldest sibling and was born on September 29, 1993. Kat as Funneh is the middle sibling who was born on October 31, 1995. Wenny as Lunar is the second youngest sibling born on February 28, 1997. Allen as Draco is the youngest sibling and was born on May 12, 1998.

Their father came to Canada by boat in the 1990s. Their parents met two years before Rainbow was born. Both their parents worked in the same local Boston Pizza restaurant—their father worked as a chef and their mother worked as a dishwasher. They were financially struggling and sometimes ate less out of fear of not being able to feed their children. One day, their father's boss gave him a used Famicom Disk System, a Nintendo console his daughter no longer wanted. It was "the best thing ever" to the siblings, who spent hours playing video games. When it got broken one day, their father saved money and bought a GameCube four years later.

In 2008, their parents bought a Vietnamese restaurant in Edmonton to support the family. Due to the lack of success, the siblings had to work at the restaurant after school. When the business was slow sometimes, they found watching YouTube at the restaurant "less miserable." However, later on, the restaurant business became a "depressing point in [her] life" due to arguments arising from debt. Three years later, they sold the restaurant. Their parents owned multiple businesses between 2008 and 2017, the last being a bubble tea shop. Apart from working for their parents, Rainbow worked as a cytotechnologist and Gold worked as a barista at Starbucks with an additional job as an accounting clerk to her college that she studied. Sometimes they didn't have enough money to pay their bills, so as an "escape from reality," they would use tip money from the restaurant to buy more video games.

Funneh described herself as a quiet person during her childhood. During elementary school, she aspired to become an artist as she loved drawing and kept a sketchbook, with an additional passion for gaming. During middle school, she would also record her funny skits with an old digital camera that her parents gave to her, realizing the passion she acquired for pursuing creative filmmaking. In high school, she excelled in classes. She skipped school "a lot" and had to work at the restaurant if she did. After creating her YouTube channel, she would write video scripts in school library at lunchtime when she did go to school. She graduated from high school in 2013 and decided to pursue a career in digital media.

Lunar started to draw from a young age after being inspired by watching anime like Inuyasha, Noragami, The Disastrous Life of Saiki K., and a "lot of anime".

== YouTube career ==
=== 2011–2013: Early beginnings ===
On September 1, 2011, Gold and Funneh started their own YouTube channels under the pseudonyms "GoldenGlare" and "ItsFunneh", where the latter explained the origin of the name "ItsFunneh" during their first Q&A video: "So, the funny part comes from me. Growing up, I was pretty much a humorous person, and we also live in Canada, so then I thought putting like the 'Eh' at the end of 'ItsFunneh' would make it hilarious, and now that's how the YouTube channel was created and all of my gamertags." Gold explained that the name "GoldenGlare" came from her fascination with gold, heroes and Marvel and thought of a hero that emits golden laser beams from their eyes.

The first video that Funneh posted was Black Ops Ranger match, which has since been changed to a private video. The Krew were "obsessed" with Minecraft, which was very popular at that time; she suggested to make some Minecraft machinimas and parodies to her siblings. One of their parodies garnered one million but was taken down due to YouTube copyright strike. They continued making silent Minecraft machinima with no commentary, but as Funneh became busier with high school, she stopped posting, with the intention to quit YouTube. Gold one day encouraged Funneh to continue posting videos again and to commentate, the latter of which she was initially against but was convinced to do so.

Later on, their other siblings gradually began making appearances in videos. Draco explained that "DraconiteDragon" came from his fascination with dragons (Draco: Greco-Latin word for dragon), and at that time, he liked draconite, a mythical gemstone. Rainbow came up with "PaintingRainbows" as she liked rainbows and according to her, it symbolises bringing happiness to others. Lunar came up with "LunarEclipse" because she liked lunar eclipses but accidentally misspelled it as "LunarEclispe".

=== 2013–present: YouTube success ===
In 2013, the channel became more active. At this time, Krew started releasing comedic Minecraft videos. This is when they started gaining popularity. They still worked at the family business until the YouTube channel started making more money than the family business could; at that point, they started doing YouTube as a full-time job, allowing their parents to retire. They also began attending conventions to meet their fans. In 2020, ItsFunneh was the most viewed Canadian gaming channel, and 5th among all countries. In the same year, Krew was signed by Creative Artists Agency (CAA).

== Games ==
There are two games featuring Krew in them: Krew Eats, and Krew Merge Pets. Both are mobile games for iOS and Android. Both Krew Eats and Krew Merge Pets are published by BBTV.

== Personal lives ==
They have three dogs and two cats.

== Awards and nominations ==
Year	Award	Category	Result	Ref.
2018	Bloxy	Best Twitter channel	Won	
2018	Bloxy	Best video channel	Nominated	
2018	Shorty	Gaming	Nominated	
2019	Roblox Innovation Award	Best Comedic Video	Won	
2019	Roblox Innovation Award	Favorite Livestreamer	Nominated	
2020	Bloxy	Roblox Video of the Year	Nominated	
2020	Bloxy	Best Video Content Creator	Nominated	
2021	Bloxy	Best Video Content Creator	Nominated	
2022	Roblox Innovation Award	Video Star of the Year	Nominated	
2022	Roblox Innovation Award	Video Star Video of the Year	Won	
2024	Roblox Innovation Award	Best Video Star Video	Nominated	
