= Salt Bae =

Turkish chef and restaurateur (born 1983)

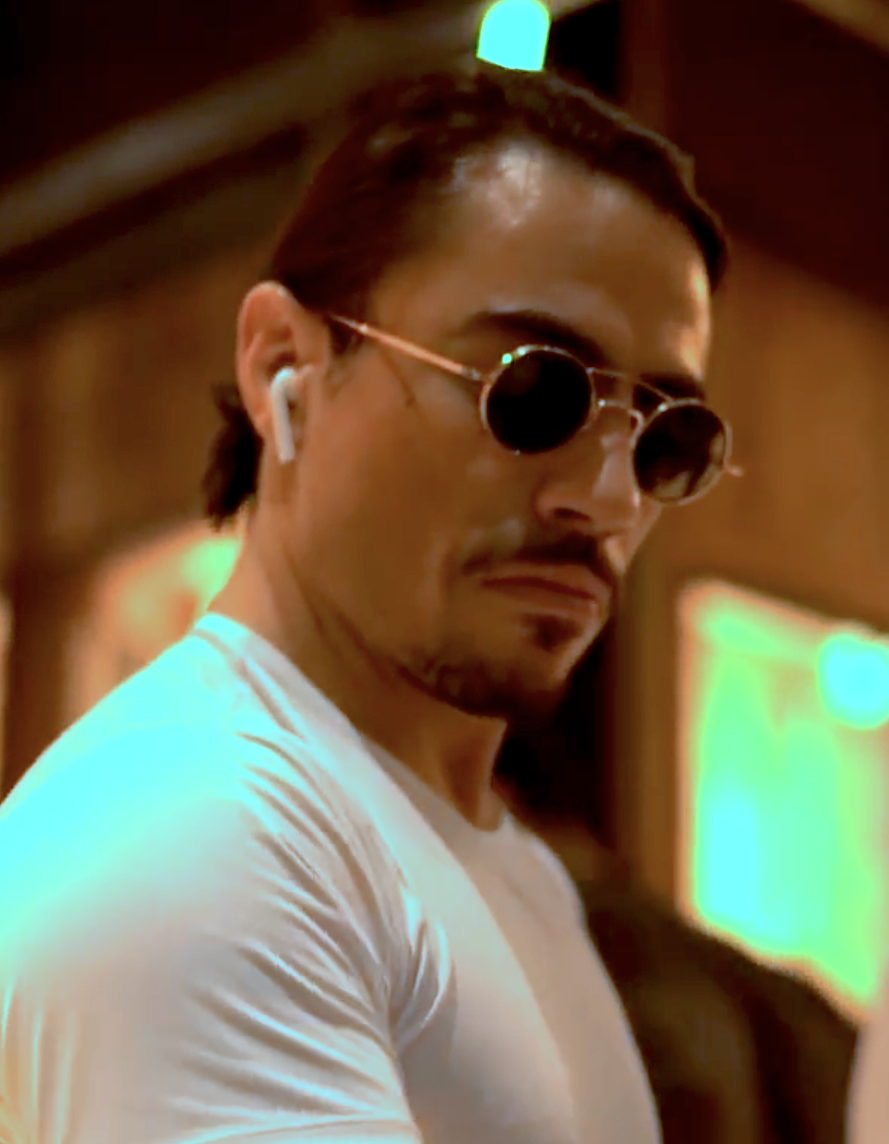
- Salt Bae in 2018
- Born: Nusret Gökçe; 9 August 1983 (age 43); Paşalı, Erzurum, Turkey
- Occupations: Butcher, chef, restaurateur
- Known for: Internet meme, luxury steak houses
- Culinary career
- Cooking style: Turkish, Western
- Current restaurant
- Nusr-Et
- Website: www.nusr-et.com.tr

Nusret Gökçe (Turkish: [nusˈɾet ɟœcˈtʃe]; born 9 August 1983), better known as Salt Bae, is a Turkish butcher, chef, and restaurateur of Kurdish origin. Gökçe's performance of a technique for preparing and seasoning meat became an Internet meme in January 2017. He founded Nusr-Et, a chain of luxury steak houses. As of 2021, Nusr-Et has branches in Turkey, Greece, the United States, the United Kingdom, Italy, Spain, the United Arab Emirates, Qatar, and Saudi Arabia. The name of the restaurant chain comes from his own name and et, which means "meat" in Turkish.

== Early life ==
Nusret Gökçe was born 9 August 1983 in Paşalı, a village in Şenkaya district of Erzurum Province, to a Kurdish family. His father, Faik, was a mineworker. The family's finances forced him to leave school in the sixth grade (aged 11–12) to work as a butcher's apprentice in the Kadıköy district of Istanbul.

== Chef, restaurateur and internet prominence ==
A clip from the viral video

Gökçe visited several countries, including Argentina and the United States, between 2007 and 2010, where he worked in local restaurants for free in order to gain experience as a cook and a restaurateur. After his return to Turkey, Gökçe opened his first restaurant in Istanbul in 2010, and later opened a Dubai restaurant in 2014.

In January 2017, Gökçe became more widely known as Salt Bae through a series of viral internet videos and memes that show him "suavely" cutting meat and sprinkling salt, such as "Ottoman Steak", posted on his restaurant's Twitter account. The post was viewed over 16 million times on Instagram, after which he was dubbed "Salt Bae" due to his peculiar way of sprinkling salt: dropping it from his fingertips to his forearm, and then onto the dish. Due to the viral exposure gained from this post, Gökçe's profile has expanded enormously and he has served many celebrities and politicians from around the world.

=== Reviews ===
Despite the international fame, early professional reviews in 2018 of his New York City steakhouse were generally negative. The New York Post's Steve Cuozzo called the restaurant "Public Rip-off No. 1" and Joshua David Stein writing in GQ called the steak mundane and the hamburgers overcooked. Other critics described the dishes "as over-salted as they are overpriced", said the "meat was tough with globs of fat and gristle, and severely lacking in flavor", and argued that "finishing a meal there constitutes some kind of personal victory over your own body and instincts and mouth". Other reviewers described the dining experience as "overpriced".

The spectacle with which Gökçe performed his tableside preparations garnered a more positive reception. Eater's Robert Sietsema stated, "If you are intent on judging New York's new branch of Nusr-Et only as a steakhouse, you'll probably be disappointed ... If, on the other hand, you appraise the place as dinner theater, you will find it satisfying—but only if Salt Bae is in the house." Gökçe's Manhattan burger bar, once dubbed New York's worst restaurant, closed in 2023, three years after opening.

In late September 2020, his restaurant in Boston was ordered to close by public health officials several days after it opened due to violations of COVID-19 safety standards. It reopened in early October 2020. In October 2021, Gökçe came under scrutiny from the British media over a £37,000 bill for a meal at one of his UK restaurants. In February 2024, it was reported that Gökçe's Knightsbridge restaurant in London, which serves steaks priced at almost £700, was turning off the heat while pre-tax profits rose 44% to almost £3.3 million in 2022 as turnover soared almost 66% to £13.6 million. In September 2024, the restaurant reported a £4.2 million drop in revenue from £13.6 million to £9.3 million, with profits falling from £3.3 million to £2.2 million.

=== Legal problems ===
In November 2019, four of Gökçe's former employees accused him of taking a share of their tips. They alleged that they were fired from his New York restaurant when they tried to ask questions about the tips. A trial was set to take place to investigate the issue, until Gökçe reached a settlement with his former employees and paid them $230,000. Explaining why he had fired them, he said: "I was not satisfied with the performance of the four employees... Since they were fired, they acted with the feeling of 'look what we are going to do to you' and put forward these tip allegations." In April 2023, his Knightsbridge restaurant also faced accusations that former staff members were the victims of tip theft and discrimination according to a Business Insider investigation.

=== Controversies ===
In December 2017, Gökçe was criticized for a photo taken in 2016, shortly after former Cuban president Fidel Castro's death, in which he compared himself to Castro, including wearing a beret and holding a cigar.

A September 2018 video showing Gökçe serving food to the Venezuelan president Nicolas Maduro at an Istanbul restaurant was criticised because of food shortages in Venezuela. Protests erupted at his Miami restaurant as a result.

Following the 2022 FIFA World Cup final between Argentina and France in December 2022, Gökçe was criticized for joining the Argentine players on the field post-match, disturbing the players, biting their medals, and handling the FIFA World Cup Trophy; a gesture reserved for winners and heads of state. As a result, FIFA launched an investigation into Gökçe's actions after the final.

== Park Hyatt Istanbul ==
In 2019, Gökçe purchased the luxury hotel Park Hyatt Istanbul – Maçka Palas for a reported €50 million. He subsequently opened a Nusr-Et steakhouse location and established his personal residence within the building.

== Philanthropy ==
Gökçe has been involved with charitable work, such as building a school in his hometown of Erzurum. Gökçe stated on Instagram that he had built a library, a guest house, a mosque, an English education center, and a computer laboratory in the town.
