= Château de Gudanes =

18th-century château in Ariège, France

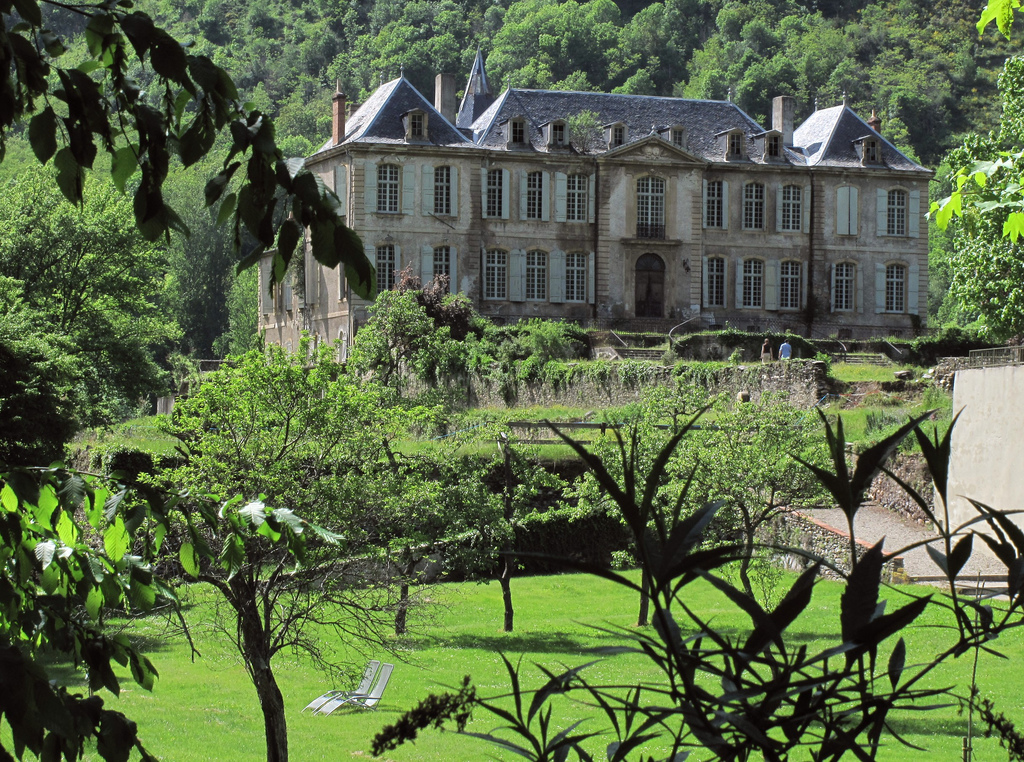
- The château in 2008

- Location within France

General information
- Status: Under renovation
- Architectural style: Neoclassical
- Location: Château-Verdun, France
- Coordinates: 42.783835°N 1.680329°E
- Construction started: 1741
- Construction stopped: 1750
- Renovated: 2013–present
- Client: Louis Gaspard de Sales, Marquis de Gudanes
- Owner: Karina and Craig Waters

Technical details
- Floor count: 5
- Floor area: 43,000 square feet

Design and construction
- Architect: Ange-Jacques Gabriel
- Awards: 2016 Fondation Prince Louis de Polignac Medal of Honour

Other information
- Number of rooms: 94

Website
- chateaugudanes.com

Monument historique
- Designated: 14 June 1994
- Reference no.: PA00132943

The Château de Gudanes is an 18th-century neoclassical château in the commune of Château-Verdun, in the southern French department of Ariège. It is built on the site of an older castle destroyed in 1580. The château has been a designated monument historique since 1994, but fell into ruin in the late 20th century. It was purchased in 2013 and is currently being restored.

== History ==
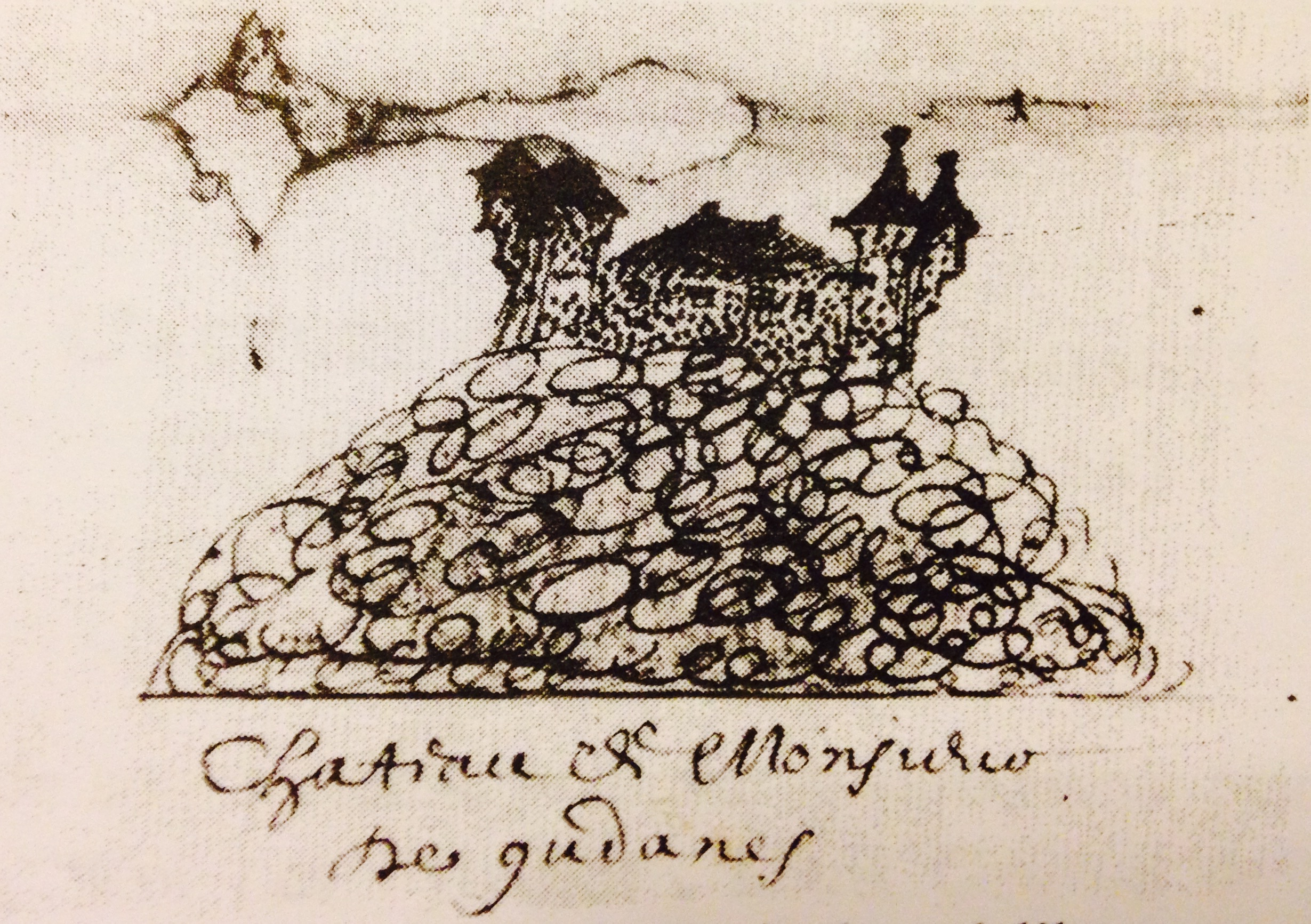
A sketch of the earlier Château de Gudanes as it looked in 1669

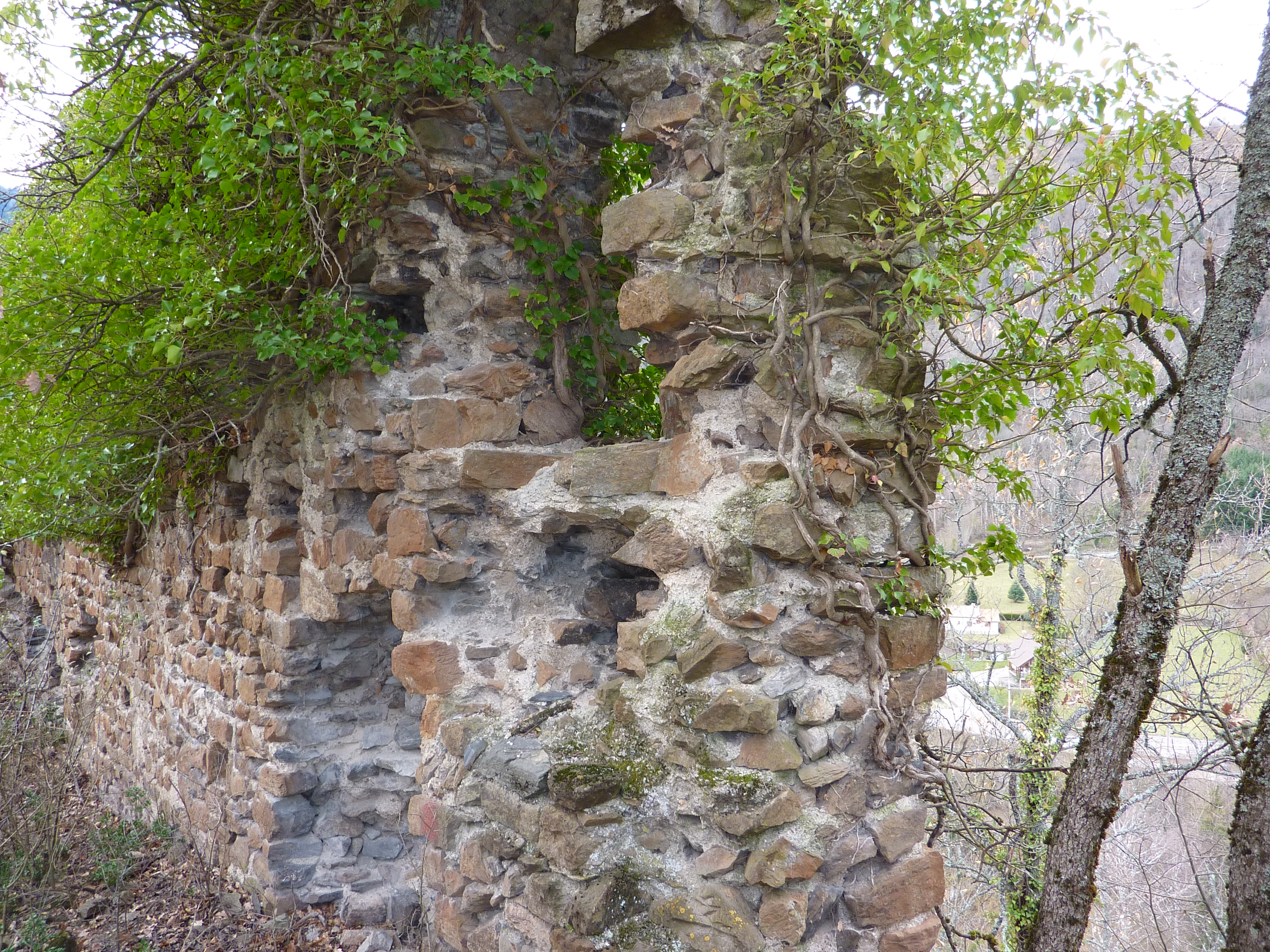
Ruins of the medieval Château Verdun

The commune of Château-Verdun takes its name from a medieval fort that once stood on the site. The first documented existence of a structure was in 1213 when it was counted among the fortifications in the County of Foix by Raymond-Roger, Count of Foix in his report to the Counts of Toulouse. At the beginning of the 14th century, Pierre Arnaud de Château-Verdun was recorded as Seneschal of the County of Foix.

Château Verdun came into the possession of the de Sales (or de Salles) de Lordat family, which came to prominence in the 10th century and amassed considerable wealth and power in Toulouse.

In the 1560s, during the French Wars of Religion, the barony of Gudanes (alternatively spelled Gudannes, Gudanne, Gudaigne and Guadagne) belonged to Fantillon de Sales, a prominent Huguenot. In 1567, the Huguenots of Pamiers fled to the village of Cabannes, where they were massacred by Catholic troops from Castelnau-Durban on 25 May 1567. On 27 September 1568, Fantillon de Sales led a retaliatory attack, slaughtering many Catholics in Tarascon. In 1580, the largely Catholic population of Gudanes launched an uprising against de Sales, plundering and ransacking the Château. Fantillon de Sales was forced to flee but was eventually massacred.

Fantillon's brother Jean-Paul de Sales, a Catholic, inherited the barony. The de Sales received a considerable expanse of land, consisting chiefly of immense forests covering the Pyrenees, in the barony of Gudanes, and were rewarded with a Marquisate de Gudanes. Records from 1671 describe the castle on the site as ruins.

The final Marquis de Gudanes, Louis-Gaspard de Sales, also baron de Château-Verdun, d'Aston, and de Luzenac, was a commandant for the king for the province of Foix. Through his marriage to Marie de Lordat en 1730, he expanded his lands considerably. He was so wealthy he was known as Le Roi des Pyrénées ("The King of the Pyrenees").

Louis-Gaspard de Sales hired noted architect Ange-Jacques Gabriel to design the new Château de Gudanes, which was built from 1741 to 1750. The Marquis hosted lavish parties frequented by the cultural elite, including the Protestant writer Laurent Angliviel de la Beaumelle, the mathematician Charles Marie de La Condamine, Georges-Louis Leclerc, Comte de Buffon, Denis Diderot, Montesquieu and Voltaire.

Louis-Gaspard de Sales died with only a daughter, Marie Thérèse Josephe, and upon his death bequeathed all his assets to his son-in-law, Louis-Guillaume-Antoine de Mengaud, Baron de la Hage. When the French Revolution broke out in 1789, the aristocracy were stripped of their titles and lands. Mengaud was arrested but died before he faced trial.

Property belonging to the aristocracy and the church was auctioned. Pierre Astrié, a wealthy businessman from the neighboring town of Ax-les-Thermes, purchased the Château de Gudanes. In 1811, Pierre's son Jérome-Stanislas d'Astrié was living at Château de Gudanes. The Astrié family were ennobled in 1824, becoming d'Astrié de Gudanes, during the Bourbon Restoration when the French monarchy was temporarily restored.

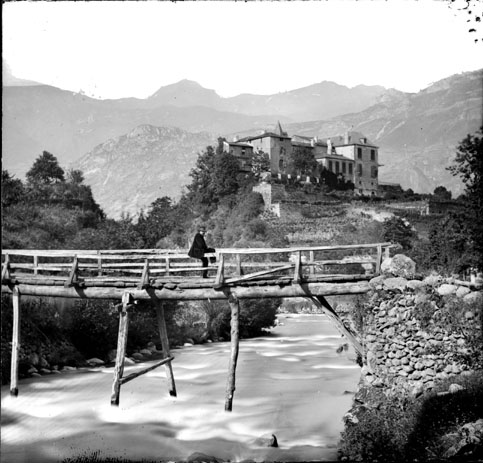
The château de Gudanes, taken prior to 1910.

New laws stripped the local population of their right to make use of the forest resources, such as collecting firewood and grazing their livestock. This led to a series of uprisings known as the "War of the Maidens", in which masked men, sometimes disguised as women, protested against the wealthy landowners. The protesters targeted Château de Gudanes, pillaging it on 7 and 10 August 1830.

Jérome-Stanislas d'Astrié de Gudanes died in 1843, and the Château de Gudanes passed to his eldest daughter, Charlotte, and her husband, the politician Charles de Limairac. The Limairacs made several changes, placing their family crest over the front entrance, and installed new wrought iron balconies that included the monogram of Charlotte d'Astrié de Limairac.

Charles de Limairac died in 1860 and Charlotte died in 1871, leaving the château to their eldest son, Adolphe de Limairac. He made more renovations between 1870 and 1875. He died childless in 1884, leaving the château to his sister, Marie Baudon de Mony, who died in 1922. It is believed Marie's sons and grandchildren lived in the château during World War II. In 1963, the castle and surrounding land was purchased by the Tarn-et-Garonne department for use as holiday vacation spot. In the 1960s and 1970s, the château was used to host children's summer camps.

== Development plans and restoration ==
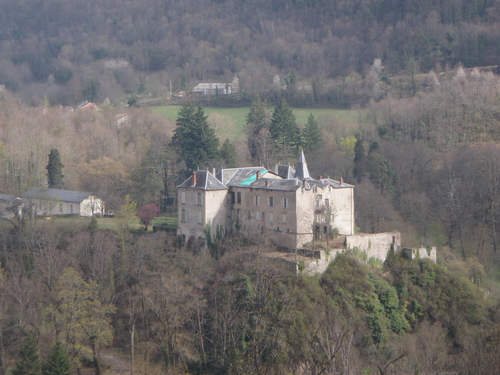
The château as seen in 2009

In 1989, the estate was bought by an English consortium, SCI Château de Gudanes, with the purpose of turning it into a luxury hotel. However, the renovation was delayed, and in 1994 the château was designated a national historical monument, causing administrative delays in planning permission and preventing desired renovations. SCI Château de Gudanes continued to fight for the project until 2009, when it abandoned the idea and put the building on the market. The house was in a dire condition by 2010, with the roof in danger of collapse.

In 2011, an Australian couple, Craig and Karina Waters from Perth, were looking for a vacation home in France, when they came across the Château de Gudanes online. They traveled to see it in person, and after two years of negotiations, they purchased it and decided to begin renovations

By the time their renovations began, the house was in serious decay: several floors had collapsed, the roof had fallen through in four places, trees were growing inside, and the floor was covered in a rubble of dirt, rotten wood, fallen plaster and mushrooms, and green mold covered the walls. The house had never been wired for heat or electricity. Much of the original interior remained, however, including artisan-carved woodwork, stained glass, gilt-framed mirrors and ornamental plaster.

The Waters have documented the restoration of the building online via a blog and social media accounts, sharing their progress and finds, including a fresco painting behind wallpaper, secret tunnels and ancient artifacts. The Waters, who had assumed that nothing remained of the original medieval fort, uncovered two of the fort's towers. They also discovered a hole in the floor 10 feet (3.0 m) deep, which lead to a previously unknown section of the basement, which they suspect may have been meant for safe passage during World War II.

== See also ==
- List of castles in France
