= Château-Verdun =

Commune in Occitanie, France

Château-Verdun Castèlverdun (Occitan)
- Commune
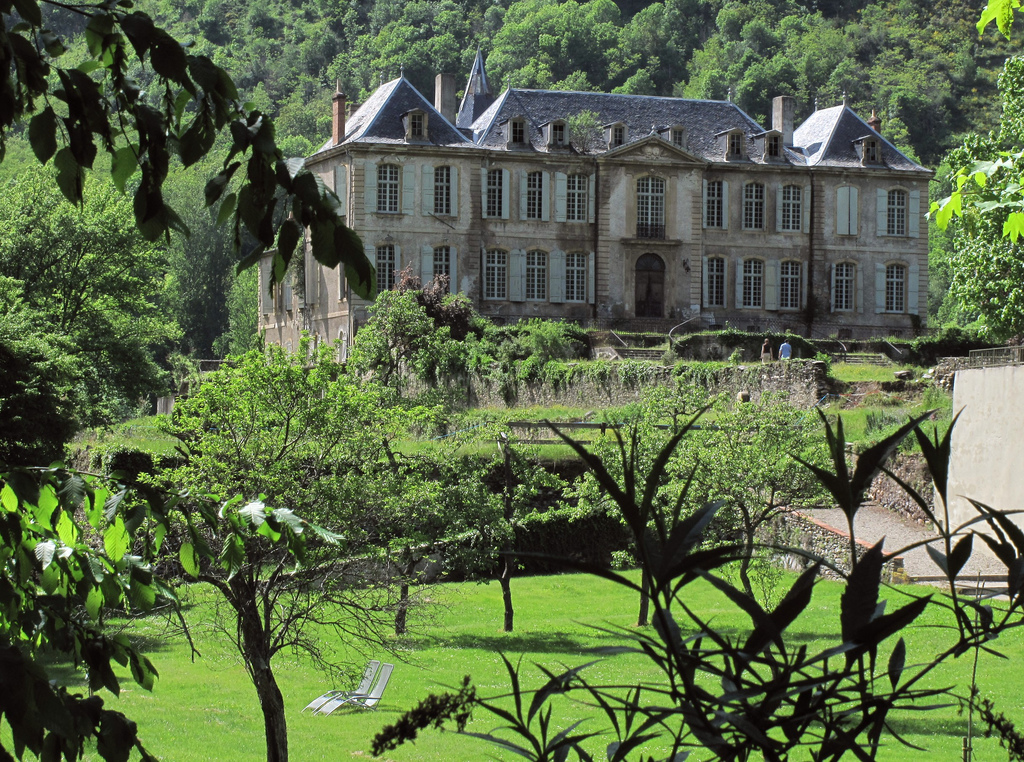
- Château de Gudanes
- Location of Château-Verdun
- Location within France Location within Occitanie
- Coordinates: 42°46′59″N 1°40′50″E
- Country: France
- Region: Occitania
- Department: Ariège
- Arrondissement: Foix
- Canton: Haute-Ariège

Government
  - Mayor (2020–2026): Thierry Boës
- Area^{1}: 0.7 km^{2} (0.27 sq mi)
- Elevation: 550 m (1,800 ft)
- Highest elevation: 766 m (2,513 ft)
- Lowest elevation: 529 m (1,736 ft)
- Population (2023): 41
  - Density: 59/km^{2} (150/sq mi)
- Time zone: UTC+01:00 (CET)
  - Summer (DST): UTC+02:00 (CEST)
- INSEE/Postal code: 09096 /09310
- ^{1} French Land Register data, which excludes lakes, ponds, glaciers > 1 km^{2} (0.386 sq mi or 247 acres) and river estuaries.

Château-Verdun (French: [ʃɑto vɛʁdœ̃]; Languedocien: Castèlverdun) is a commune in the Ariège department in southwestern France.

== Population ==
Historical population
Year	Pop.	±% p.a.
1968	63	—
1975	46	−4.39%
1982	44	−0.63%
1990	39	−1.50%
1999	39	+0.00%
2007	52	+3.66%
2012	39	−5.59%
2017	43	+1.97%
2023	41	−0.79%
Source: INSEE

== See also ==
- Communes of the Ariège department
