= Friedman =

Friedman, Friedmann, and Freedman are surnames of German origin, and from the 17th century were also adopted by Ashkenazi Jews (see Jewish surnames). It is the 9th most common surname in Israel (8th among Jews) and most common exclusively Ashkenazi name. Notable people with these surnames include:

== Artists ==
- Arnold Friedman (1879–1946), American painter
- Barnett Freedman (1901–1958), British painter and graphic artist
- Drew Friedman (cartoonist), American cartoonist
- Harold Freedman (1915–1999), artist public murals
- Jill Freedman (1939–2019), American photographer
- Ken Friedman (born 1949), Australian-American design researcher
- Tom Friedman (artist) (born 1965), American sculptor

== Business people ==
- Adena Friedman, President and CEO of Nasdaq, Inc.
- Ann Freedman, American art dealer
- Eugene Freedman (1925–2008), American entrepreneur and philanthropist
- George Friedman (born 1949), Hungarian-American geostrategist, founder of Stratfor
- Richard L. Friedman (born 1940), businessman and real estate developer
- Stephen Friedman (economist) (born 1937), American businessman and politician, former chairman and CEO of Goldman Sachs

== Economists, lawyers and politicians ==
- Benjamin M. Friedman (born 1944), American political economist
- Bernát Friedmann (1843–1925), Hungarian jurist and criminal lawyer
- Bernhard Friedmann (1932–2021), German politician
- Bernie Friedman, attorney in Hollywood, Florida
- Daniel Friedmann (born 1936), Israeli law professor and former Minister of Justice
- David D. Friedman (born 1945), American economist, physicist, legal scholar, and libertarian theorist, son of Milton Friedman
- David M. Friedman (born 1958), American bankruptcy lawyer and United States Ambassador to Israel
- Dawn Freedman (born 1942), British judge
- Don Friedman (Colorado politician) (1930–2013), American politician
- J. Isaac Friedman (1877–1949), American politician
- James Friedman, Professor of Law Emeritus at the University of Maine School of Law
- Jerome B. Friedman (born 1943), American judge
- Lawrence M. Friedman (born 1930), American law professor
- Lee M. Friedman (1871–1957), American lawyer and historian
- Leon Friedman (politician) (1886–1948), American politician
- Leon Friedman (legal scholar) (born 1933), American legal scholar
- Louis L. Friedman (1906–1997), New York politician and judge
- Martin Freedman, Canadian lawyer
- Michel Friedman (born 1956), German lawyer
- Milton Friedman (1912–2006), American economist and statistician, Nobel Memorial Prize winner
- Patri Friedman (born 1976), American libertarian activist and theorist of political economy
- Rose Friedman (1910–2009), American economist and law professor
- Samuel Freedman (1903–1993), lawyer, judge, and Chief Justice of the Province of Manitoba
- Stephen J. Friedman (born 1938), dean of Pace University School of Law
- Sylvan Friedman (1908–1979), American politician
- Wolfgang Friedmann – (1907 – 1972) German American legal scholar

== Musicians ==
- Adam Friedman (singer), American singer
- Amelia Freedman (1940–2025), clarinetist and arts administrator, Nash Ensemble
- Avery Friedman, American musician and singer-songwriter, signed to Audio Antihero.
- Avraham Fried, American composer and musical entertainer, also known as Avraham Friedman
- Benny Friedman (born 1985), American Hasidic Jewish singer
- Dean Friedman (born 1955), American singer-songwriter
- Debbie Friedman (1951–2011), American musician
- Don Friedman (1935–2016), American jazz pianist
- Eric Friedman, American musician and songwriter
- Erick Friedman (1939–2004), American violinist
- Gary William Friedman, American composer
- Harry Freedman (1922–2005), Canadian composer, musician and educator
- Ignaz Friedman (1882–1948), Polish-Austrian pianist, composer, also known as Ignacy Friedman
- Kinky Friedman (1944–2024), American country musician, candidate for the Texas gubernatorial election, 2006
- Marc Friedman (born 1977), electric bassist/multi-instrumentalist and composer
- Marty Friedman (born 1962), American-Japanese guitarist
- Matthew Friedman (musician), American musician, singer and performer
- Max C. Freedman, American songwriter and lyricist, best remembered for co-writing the song Rock Around the Clock
- Michael Friedman (1975–2017), American composer and lyricist
- Ross the Boss Friedman (1954–2026), American guitarist
- Tim Freedman (born 1964), Australian musician

== Philosophers ==
- Egon Friedell (1878–1938), Austrian philosopher, also known as Egon Friedmann
- Hermann Friedmann (1873–1957), Polish-German philosopher and jurist
- Michael Friedman (1947–2025), American philosopher of science

== Photographers ==
- Glen E. Friedman (born 1962), American photographer
- Robert Capa (1913–1954), Hungarian-American photographer born Endré Ernő Friedmann

== In religion ==
- Alexander Zusia Friedman (1897–1943), Polish rabbi, educator, activist and journalist
- Avrohom Yaakov Friedman (first Sadigura rebbe) (1820–1883)
- Avrohom Yaakov Friedman (third Sadigura rebbe) (1884–1964)
- Avrohom Yaakov Friedman (fifth Sadigura rebbe) (1928–2013)
- David Noel Freedman (1922–2008), biblical scholar
- Denes Friedmann (1903–1944), Hungarian writer and Chief Rabbi in Újpest
- Edwin Friedman (1932–1996), applied family systems theory to congregational leadership
- Israel Friedman of Ruzhyn (1796–1850), founder of the Hasidic dynasty of Ruzhin
- Manis Friedman (born 1946), biblical scholar, author, counselor and speaker
- Meïr ben Jeremiah Friedmann (1831–1908), Hungarian-Austrian scholar, Jewish theologian
- Mordechai Shlomo Friedman (1891–1971), Boyaner Rebbe of New York
- Richard Elliott Friedman (born 1946), scholar of biblical criticism
- William S. Friedman (1868–1944), American rabbi
- Yisrael Friedman (1923–2017), Pashkaner Rebbe
- Yitzchok Friedman (1850–1917), first Rebbe of Boyan

== Scientists and mathematicians ==
- Alexander Friedmann (1888–1925), mathematician and cosmologist
- Avner Friedman (born 1932), mathematician
- Daniel P. Friedman (born 1944), computer scientist and mathematician
- Elizebeth Smith Friedman (1892–1980), US Army cryptographer
- Harold Friedman (1923–2005), US physical chemist
- Harry Friedmann (1931–2018), Israeli chemist
- Harvey Friedman (mathematician) (born 1948), mathematical logician
- Herbert Friedman (1916–2000), American rocket scientist, solar physicist, aeronomist, and astronomist
- Herbert Friedmann (1900–1987), American ornithologist
- Irving Friedman (1920–2005), geochemist
- Jerome H. Friedman (born 1939), American statistician
- Jerome Isaac Friedman (born 1930), physicist
- Joyce Friedman (1928–2018), American mathematician, operations researcher, computer scientist, and computational linguist
- Lex Fridman, computer scientist, podcaster and writer
- Louis Friedman (born 1941), American astronautics engineer
- Maurice Friedman (1903–1991), reproductive-physiology researcher
- Meyer Friedman (1910–2001), medical scientist
- Michael Freedman (born 1951), American mathematician at Microsoft Research
- Nat Friedman (born 1977), programmer
- Richard A. Friedman, psychiatrist and professor
- Samuel O. Freedman (born 1928), clinical immunologist, professor
- Stanton T. Friedman (1934–2019), physicist and ufologist
- Stuart Freedman (1944–2012), physicist
- Sy Friedman (born 1953), logician
- William F. Friedman (1891–1969), US Army cryptographer

== Academic scholars ==
- Carl Freedman (born 1951), American writer and academic
- Eric Freedman (journalist), American journalist and professor at Michigan State University
- Eric M. Freedman, American legal scholar and professor at Hofstra University
- Georges Friedmann (1902–1977), French sociologist
- James O. Freedman (1935–2006), fifteenth president of Dartmouth College
- Jeffrey Friedman (political scientist), (1959–2022)
- Paul Freedman, historian
- Renée Friedman, American Egyptologist
- Tuviah Friedman (1922–2011), director of the Institute for the Documentation of Nazi War Crimes in Haifa
- Walter A. Friedman, American academic
- Yohanan Friedmann (born 1936), Israeli scholar of Islamic studies

== Sportspeople ==
- Adar Friedmann (born 2006), Israeli rhythmic gymnast
- Andrew Friedman (born 1976), American, became baseball General Manager of the Tampa Bay Rays at age 28
- Benny Friedman (1905–1982), American Hall of Fame NFL football quarterback
- Birgit Friedmann (born 1960), German runner and 1980 world champion
- Clara Friedman (1920–2015), Israeli chess master
- Dougie Freedman (born 1974), Scottish association football manager
- Gal Fridman (born 1975), Israeli windsurfer and Olympic gold medalist
- Lee Freedman (born 1956), Australian racehorse trainer
- Lennie Friedman (born 1976), American NFL football player for the Cleveland Browns
- Limor Friedman (born 1968), Israeli Olympic gymnast
- Mark Friedman (born 1995), Canadian National Hockey League player
- Marty Friedman (1889–1986), Hall of Fame NBA pro basketball player and coach
- Maxwell Friedman (born 1996), American professional wrestler
- Nicole Freedman (born 1972), American Olympic cyclist
- Ross Friedman (born 1992), American Major League Soccer player
- Spencer Freedman (born 1998), American college basketball player for the Harvard Crimson and NYU Violets
- Ze'ev Friedman (1944–1972), Israeli Olympic weightlifter and victim of the Munich massacre

== In television and film ==
- Albert Freedman (1922–2017), American television producer
- Budd Friedman (1932–2022), American actor and producer
- David F. Friedman (1923–2011), American filmmaker and producer
- Josh Friedman (born 1967), American screenwriter
- Maria Friedman (born 1961), musical theatre actress
- Mike Freedman, American pioneering cameraman
- Tal Friedman (born 1963), Israeli actor and comedian
- Vivi Friedman (1967–2012), Finnish filmmaker

== Writers ==
- Bruce Jay Friedman (1930–2020), novelist, screenwriter and playwright
- Celia S. Friedman (born 1957), science fiction novelist
- David Freedman (1898–1936), playwright and biographer
- David Friedman, a.k.a. Dafydd ab Hugh (born 1960), writer
- Esther Pauline Friedman (1918–2002), advice columnist also known as Ann Landers
- Frieda Friedman, author
- Hannah Friedman, writer, director and musician
- Jacques Frémontier (born surname Friedman; 1930–2020), French journalist and television producer
- David Gerrold (born 1944), science fiction author, also known as Jerrold David Friedman
- Mia Freedman (born 1971), former Editor of Australian Cosmopolitan magazine and blogger
- Michael Jan Friedman (born 1955), author
- Norman Friedman (born 1946), American author and analyst, strategist, and historian
- Pavel Friedmann (1921–1944), Jewish-Czechoslovak poet and victim of the Holocaust
- Rita Friedman, creator of The Letter People
- Samuel G. Freedman (born 1955), journalist
- Thomas Friedman (born 1953), columnist

== Other ==
- Benjamin H. Freedman (1890–1984), American businessman, Holocaust denier and anti-Zionist
- Elizebeth Smith Friedman (1892–1980), cryptanalyst and author
- Friedrich Franz Friedmann, tuberculosis charlatan
- Henryk Friedman (1903–1942), Polish chess master
- Hoshea Friedman, brigadier general in the IDF
- Joseph Friedman (1900–1982), inventor
- Judith Freedman, British solicitor and academic
- Karen Friedman (disambiguation), several people
- Ken Friedman (restaurateur)
- Maurice J. Freedman, (born 1939), librarian
- Morris Friedman, private stenographer
- Prahlad Friedman (born 1978), professional poker player
- Yehudit Friedman, burth name of Yehudit Nessyahu (1925–2003), Israeli Mossad agent

== Fictional characters ==
- Luke Friedman, a character in the Netflix series Grand Army
- Sally J. Freedman, protagonist in the Judy Blume novel Starring Sally J. Freedman as herself
- Sidney Freedman, psychiatrist in the television series M*A*S*H

== See also ==
- Friedemann, a German name
- Freedman, a former slave
- Fried (surname)
- Fridman
- Freeman (surname)
