= Aviad =

Name list

Aviad (Hebrew: אביעד is both a given name and surname of Hebrew origin.

== Given name ==
- Aviad Bourla (born 1993), Israeli footballer
- Aviad Frydman (born 1964), Israeli physicist
- Aviad Hacohen (born 1962), Israeli lawyer
- Aviad Kleinberg (born 1957), Israeli author and historian
- Aviad Meitar (born 1959), Israeli executive
- Aviad Raz, Israeli sociology professor
- Aviad Yafeh (1923–1977), Israeli politician

== Surname ==
- Janet Aviad (born 1943), American-born Israeli sociologist and educator
- Michal Aviad (born 1955), Israeli film director
