= Bourla =

Bourla is a surname. Notable people with the surname include:

- Albert Bourla (born 1961), Greek-American businessman
- Moisis Michail Bourlas (1918–2011), member of the Greek WWII Resistance
- Aviad Bourla (born 1993), Israeli footballer
- Pierre Bruno Bourla (1783–1866), Belgian architect
  - Bourla Theatre, theatre in Antwerp designed by Pierre
