= Fridman =

Fridman ([ˈfridman], Russian: Фри́дман) is a surname. Notable people with the surname include:

- Aleksandr Fridman

- Fridman (crater), the remains of a lunar crater on the far side of the Moon

- Alexey Maksimovich Fridman, a Russian/Soviet-Israeli physicist
- Daniel Fridman, Latvian: Daniels Frīdmans (born 1976, Riga), a Latvian-German chess master
- Gal Fridman, Israeli windsurfer and an Olympic gold medalist
- James Fridman, British graphic designer
- Lev Fridman (born 1969, Sverdlovsk), a Russian auto racing driver
- Lidia Fridman (born 1996), Russian operatic soprano
- Limor Fridman (born 1968), Israeli Olympic gymnast
- Mikhail Fridman, Russian businessman
- Olga Fridman (born 1998), Ukrainian-Israeli tennis player
- Yasmin Fridman (born 1973), Israeli politician
- Yonatan Fridman (born 2003), Israeli acrobatic gymnast
- Lex Fridman (born 1986), Russian-American computer scientist and podcast host.

== Fridmann ==
- Dave Fridmann

== Frydman ==
- Achilles Frydman (1905 - 1940), a Polish chess player
- Aviad Frydman (born 1964), Israeli professor of physics
- Benoît Frydman (born 1965)
- Gérald Frydman
- Jean Frydman (1925–2021), a French resistant and businessman
- Judith Frydman (fl. 2010s–2020s), American biochemist
- Lucio Frydman (born 1965), Israeli chemist
- Maurice Frydman, Polish: Maurycy Frydman(-Mor) (1901–1976)
- Monique Frydman (born 1943), French painter
- Pamela Frydman (fl. 2010s), American rabbi
- Paulino (Paulin) Frydman (1905–1982), a Polish chess player
- René Frydman (born 1943), French physician
- Roman Frydman (born 1948), a Polish-American economist
- Serge Frydman

== See also ==
- Freedman
- Friedmann (Friedman)
- Frydman (Slovak: Fridman, Hungarian: Frigyesvágása), a village in Poland
- Freeman (surname)
