= Richard Friedman =

Richard Friedman may refer to:

- Richard Friedman (filmmaker), American filmmaker
- Richard L. Friedman (born 1940), businessman and real estate developer
- Richard C. Friedman (1941–2020) medical doctor who conducted research on the psychodynamics of male homosexuality
- Kinky Friedman (born 1944), Richard S. Friedman, songwriter and novelist
- Richard Elliott Friedman (born 1946), biblical scholar
- Richard A. Friedman (born 1950s), American psychiatrist

== See also ==
- Richard Freeman (disambiguation)
- Richard Feynman American theoretical physicist and Nobel Laureate
