= List of presidential trips made by Bill Clinton (1997) =

This is a list of presidential trips made by Bill Clinton during 1997, the fifth year of his presidency as the 42nd president of the United States. International trips are highlighted in blue.

This list excludes trips made within Washington, D.C., the U.S. federal capital in which the White House, the official residence and principal workplace of the president, is located. It also excludes the capital's immediate surroundings in Maryland and Virginia, such as Andrews Air Force Base in Maryland, where the president typically boards Air Force One for all trips outside the area. Also excluded are trips to Camp David, the country residence of the president.

== January ==
State or country	Areas visited	Dates	Details
South Carolina	Hilton Head	December 30–January 1	Holiday vacation.
U.S. Virgin Islands	St. Thomas	January 1–5	Holiday vacation.
Illinois	Northbrook	January 22	Visited Stanley Field Middle School. Addressed the First in the World Consortium at Glenbrook North High School.

== February ==
State or country	Areas visited	Dates	Details
Georgia	Augusta	February 5	Spoke about education policy at Augusta State University's Physical Education Athletic Complex.
Maryland	Annapolis	February 10	Addressed a joint session of the Maryland General Assembly at the State House.
New York	New York	February 18	Participated in a roundtable discussion on welfare reform at Riverside Church. Attended the Business Enterprise Awards Luncheon at the New York Public Library Main Branch. Attended a DSCC dinner at Shelby Bryan's home.
Massachusetts	Boston	February 18–19	Participated in a roundtable discussion on juvenile crime at the John W. McCormack State Office Building. Spoke at the University of Massachusetts Boston's Clark Athletic Center.

== March ==
State or country	Areas visited	Dates	Details
New York	New York	March 1–2	Celebrated his daughter Chelsea Clinton's 17th birthday. Stayed at the Waldorf Astoria New York. Saw Chicago at the Shubert Theatre and Rent at the Nederlander Theatre.
Arkansas	Little Rock, Arkadelphia, College Station	March 4	Surveyed damage from the March 1997 tornado outbreak.
Michigan	Lansing	March 6	Addressed a joint session of the Michigan Legislature at the State Capitol.
North Carolina	Raleigh	March 13	Addressed a joint session of the North Carolina General Assembly at the Legislative Building.
Florida	Aventura, Miami, West Palm Beach	March 13–14	Attended a DSCC dinner at Turnberry Isle Resort and Club, and a Saxophone Club reception at the Sheraton Bal Harbour Hotel. Stayed at Greg Norman's home in Miami, where Clinton fell on a flight of stairs and injured his knee. He was taken to St. Mary's Medical Center in West Palm Beach for treatment, and an operation was performed at the National Naval Medical Center after Clinton returned to Washington. The injury forced Clinton to cancel a planned visit on the morning of March 14 to Lighthouse Elementary School in Jupiter, and he instead spoke to the students by telephone from aboard Air Force One.
Finland	Helsinki	March 20–21	Summit meeting with Russian president Boris Yeltsin. Also met with President Martti Ahtisaari.

== April ==
State or country	Areas visited	Dates	Details
New York	New York	April 15	Observed the Kick Butts Day anti-smoking campaign during a visit to Andries Hudde Junior High School in Midwood, Brooklyn. Attended a DCCC luncheon at the Brooklyn Botanic Garden. Attended a New York Mets–Los Angeles Dodgers game at Shea Stadium which commemorated the 50th anniversary of Jackie Robinson becoming the first Black player in Major League Baseball.
North Dakota	Grand Forks	April 22	Surveyed damage from the 1997 Red River flood. Spoke about recovery at Grand Forks Air Force Base.
Pennsylvania	Philadelphia	April 27–28	Participated in AmeriCorps volunteer work in the Germantown neighborhood. Stayed at the Wyndham Hotel. Attended the opening ceremony of the Presidents' Summit For America's Future at Marcus Foster Memorial Stadium, followed by a luncheon at the Benjamin Franklin Hotel and an event at George Washington Nebinger Elementary School.

== May ==
State or country	Areas visited	Dates	Details
Maryland	Baltimore	May 2	Attended a Senate Democratic caucus retreat at the Harbour Court Hotel, where he announced an agreement on the 1998 United States federal budget.
Mexico	Mexico City, Tlaxcala	May 5–7	State visit. Met with President Ernesto Zedillo. Visit originally planned for April 11–12, but postponed due to Clinton's knee injury on March 13.
Costa Rica	San José	May 7–9	Attended the Summit Meeting of Presidents of the Central American Republics. Met President José María Figueres and travelled to Braulio Carrillo National Park.
Barbados	Bridgetown	May 9–11	Attended the U.S.-Caribbean Community summit meeting. Signed the Partnership for Prosperity and Security in the Caribbean pact.
Maryland	Baltimore	May 18	Gave the commencement address at Morgan State University's Hughes Field.
West Virginia	Clarksburg	May 22	Participated in a townhall meeting on education at Robert C. Byrd High School.
France	Paris	May 26–27	Attended the NATO Summit Meeting and the signing of the NATO-Russia Founding Act.
Netherlands	The Hague, Rotterdam	May 27–28	Attended the U.S.-EU Summit Meeting. Attended the 50th anniversary of the Marshall Plan.
United Kingdom	London	May 28–29	Met with Prime Minister Tony Blair. Attended a Cabinet meeting.
New York	West Point	May 31	Gave the commencement address at the United States Military Academy's Michie Stadium.

== June ==
State or country	Areas visited	Dates	Details
California	San Diego	June 13	Gave the commencement address at the University of California, San Diego's RIMAC complex.
Colorado	Littleton, Denver	June 19–22	Visited the National Digital Television Center in Littleton. Hosted the 23rd G8 summit at Denver Central Library. Stayed at the Brown Palace Hotel.
California	San Francisco, Los Angeles	June 22–23	Addressed the United States Conference of Mayors meeting at the Fairmont San Francisco. Campaigned for Senator Barbara Boxer at the Hyatt Regency San Francisco. Visited Mar Vista Elementary School in Los Angeles. Attended a DSCC dinner at The Beverly Hilton and a Saxophone Club reception at Billboard Live.
Tennessee	Nashville	June 25	Addressed the Family Re-Union conference at Vanderbilt University's Langford Auditorium.
Illinois	Chicago	June 25	Campaigned for Senator Carol Moseley Braun at the Sheraton Hotel.
Arkansas	Hope, Texarkana	June 25–26	Attended the funeral of his great-uncle Henry Oren Grisham at the Brazzel/Oak Crest Chapel.
New York	New York	June 26–27	Addressed the United Nations Special Session on Environment and Development.
Massachusetts	Boston	June 30	Attended the New England Presidential Luncheon at the Copley Plaza Hotel.
New York	New York	June 30	Saw a revival of A Funny Thing Happened on the Way to the Forum at the St. James Theatre. Attended a DNC dinner at the Plaza Hotel.

== July ==
State or country	Areas visited	Dates	Details
Maryland	Baltimore	July 2	Attended a Baltimore Orioles–Philadelphia Phillies game at Oriole Park at Camden Yards, as part of a Public Service Campaign for Educational Excellence event.
Spain	Palma de Majorca, Madrid, Granada	July 4–10	Vacationed with King Juan Carlos I and Queen Sophia. Attended the NATO Summit Meeting in Madrid.
Poland	Warsaw	July 10–11	Met with President Aleksander Kwaśniewski and former president Lech Wałęsa.
Romania	Bucharest	July 11	Met with President Emil Constantinescu and Romanian political leaders.
Denmark	Copenhagen	July 11–12	Met with Queen Margrethe II and Prime Minister Poul Nyrup Rasmussen. Visit originally planned for March 21, but postponed due to Clinton's knee injury on March 13.
Pennsylvania	Pittsburgh	July 17	Addressed the NAACP National Convention at the David L. Lawrence Convention Center.
Illinois	Chicago	July 17	Took questions from the National Association of Black Journalists convention at the Hyatt Regency Chicago.
Arkansas	Harrison, Jasper	July 17–18	Attended the funeral of Hilary Jones, who had mentored Clinton in Arkansas politics, at Jasper First Baptist Church.
Nevada	Incline Village	July 26	Hosted the Lake Tahoe Presidential Forum at the Hyatt hotel. Participated in water clarity testing aboard a University of California, Davis research vessel on Lake Tahoe.
California	Westwood	July 26–28	Attended a DCCC dinner at the Regency Club.
Nevada	Las Vegas	July 28	Addressed the National Governors Association conference at The Mirage.
Virginia	Bowling Green	July 30	Addressed the National Boy Scout Jamboree at Fort A.P. Hill.

== August ==
State or country	Areas visited	Dates	Details
Missouri	St. Louis	August 12	Toured a local business, Midwest Technology Corporation. Addressed the Democratic Business Council at Windows on Washington restaurant.
Rhode Island	Block Island	August 17	Visited Block Island Southeast Light.
Massachusetts	Martha's Vineyard	August 17–September 7	Summer vacation, staying at Richard L. Friedman's home. Spoke about education policy at Oak Bluffs School.

== September ==
State or country	Areas visited	Dates	Details
Maryland	Gambrills	September 8	Toured Four Seasons Elementary School.
California	Palo Alto, San Carlos, San Francisco	September 18–20	Moved his daughter Chelsea into her dorm room at Stanford University. Stayed at the Hyatt Rickey's Hotel in Palo Alto. Participated in a roundtable discussion on charter schools at the San Carlos Charter Learning Center, California's first charter school. Attended DNC receptions at the Prescott Hotel and Halsey Minor's home in San Francisco, and a Saxophone Club reception at the Fairmont San Francisco. Briefly dropped in on a party for Robin Williams' mother Laurie's 75th birthday at Williams' home in San Francisco.
New York	New York	September 21–22	Attended the opening of the 52nd United Nations General Assembly at United Nations Headquarters. Stayed at the Waldorf Astoria. Attended a performance of Carmen at the Metropolitan Opera House.
Pennsylvania	Pittsburgh	September 24	Addressed the AFL-CIO convention at the David L. Lawrence Convention Center. Attended a DNC luncheon at the Duquesne Club.
Arkansas	Little Rock	September 24–26	Stayed with his mother-in-law, Dorothy Howell Rodham. Commemorated the 40th anniversary of the desegregation of Little Rock Central High School. Addressed the Congressional Medal of Honor Society of the United States of America at the Little Rock National Airport Aerospace Education Center.
Texas	Houston	September 26	Visited San Jacinto Community College. Attended a DNC dinner at a private residence.
Arkansas	Little Rock, Hot Springs	September 26–28	Attended his class reunion at Hot Springs High School. Attended an Arkansas Razorbacks football game at War Memorial Stadium. Attended an Arkansas Democratic Party at Ray Winder Field. Visited a candlelight vigil honoring the students who desegregated Little Rock Central High School at Philander Smith College.

== October ==
State or country	Areas visited	Dates	Details
New Jersey	Newark, West Orange, Florham Park	October 8	Spoke at Metropolitan Baptist Church in Newark. Campaigned for Jim McGreevey for governor at Mayfair Farms in West Orange. Attended a DNC reception at Kushner Companies offices.
Pennsylvania	Philadelphia	October 8	Attended a Young Democrats Council and Saxophone Club reception at CoreStates Center, followed by a DNC dinner at the Victors Restaurant within the arena.
Venezuela	Caracas	October 12–13	Met with President Rafael Caldera. Visit originally scheduled for May 6–13, but postponed due to Clinton's knee injury on March 13.
Brazil	Brasília, São Paulo, Rio de Janeiro	October 13–15	Met with President Fernando Henrique Cardoso. Delivered several public addresses. Visit originally scheduled for May 6–13, but postponed due to Clinton's knee injury on March 13.
Argentina	Buenos Aires, San Carlos de Bariloche	October 15–18	Met with President Carlos Menem. Delivered several public addresses. Visit originally scheduled for May 6–13, but postponed due to Clinton's knee injury on March 13.
Illinois	Chicago	October 27–28	Celebrated his wife Hillary Clinton's 50th birthday at the Chicago Cultural Center. Stayed at the Ritz-Carlton Chicago. Visited Oscar Mayer Elementary School.
Florida	Palm Beach, Jupiter, Boca Raton, Amelia Island, Jacksonville	October 31–November 2	Toured a local business in Palm Beach, Tropical Shipping Company. Visited Lighthouse Elementary School in Jupiter, the school where he had been forced to cancel his previous planned visit on March 14 after suffering a knee injury. Attended a DNC luncheon at a private residence in Palm Beach. Attended a DCCC dinner at a private residence in Boca Raton. Attended the DNC's Autumn Retreat on Amelia Island.

== November ==
State or country	Areas visited	Dates	Details
New Jersey	Newark, Edison	November 2	Campaigned for Jim McGreevey at the Middlesex County Community College gymnasium.
New York	New York	November 2	Campaigned for Eric N. Vitaliano for Congress at the College of Staten Island athletic center. Campaigned for Ruth Messinger for mayor at the Sheraton New York Times Square Hotel.
Texas	College Station	November 6	Attended the grand opening and dedication of the George Bush Presidential Library.
Nevada	Las Vegas	November 14–15	Addressed the Women's Leadership Forum at the Sheraton Desert Inn. Attended a DNC dinner at a private residence.
California	Davis, Sacramento, Malibu, Beverly Hills, Los Angeles	November 15–17	Toured the Yolo Bypass Wildlife Area. Attended a DNC luncheon at the Sacramento Capital Club. Stayed at Jeffrey Katzenberg's home in Malibu. Attended a Rock the Vote reception at Spago. Attended a DNC dinner at Haim Saban's home in Los Angeles.
Kansas	Wichita	November 17	Toured the Cessna Aircraft Company's 21st Street Campus facility.
Missouri	St. Louis	November 17	Campaigned for Jay Nixon for Senate at the Fox Theatre.
Colorado	Denver	November 22	Attended DNC receptions at the Phipps Mansion. Met with Daisy Anderson, the last surviving widow of a Civil War veteran.
Washington	Medina, Seattle	November 22	Campaigned for Senator Patty Murray at a private residence in Medina and at the Seattle Center.
Canada	Vancouver	November 23–25	Attended the APEC Summit Meeting.

== December ==
State or country	Areas visited	Dates	Details
Ohio	Akron	December 3	Participated in a townhall meeting on race at the University of Akron's E. J. Thomas Hall. Spoke at the James A. Rhodes Arena.
Illinois	Chicago	December 3	Spoke at a joint Illinois Democratic Party–DCCC reception at Navy Pier Festival Hall. Addressed the Democratic Business Council at Lino's Restaurant.
New York	New York	December 9–10	Commemorated the 49th anniversary of the Universal Declaration of Human Rights at the Museum of Jewish Heritage. Spoke at the Madison Square Boys & Girls Club. Attended a DCCC dinner at the Waldorf Astoria Empire Room, and a DNC Hispanic dinner at the Rainbow Room.
Florida	Miami, Coral Gables	December 11	Visited Coast Guard Air Station Miami. Campaigned for Buddy MacKay at the Radisson Mart Plaza Hotel. Attended DNC receptions at the Miami Biltmore Hotel and Chris Korge's home.
Italy	Aviano Air Base	December 22	Stopped en route to Bosnia-Herzegovina.
Bosnia and Herzegovina	Sarajevo, Tuzla	December 22	Met with the Bosnian Collective Presidency and Bosnian Serb President Biljana Plavšić. Visited U.S. military personnel.
Italy	Aviano Air Base	December 22	Stopped during return to Washington D.C..
South Carolina	Hilton Head	December 30–January 1	Attended a Renaissance Weekend Institute New Year's Eve dinner at the Hyatt Regency hotel.
