= Friedemann =

- Gender: male

Origin
- Meaning: peace-man

Other names
- Related names: Friedmann, Friedman

Friedemann is a German given name meaning "peace man".

- Wilhelm Friedemann Bach, German composer and eldest son of Johann Sebastian Bach
- Friedemann Friese, a German board game designer
- Friedemann Schulz von Thun, German psychologist

Friedemann (surname)

- Nancy Friedemann-Sánchez, a Colombian–American visual artist based in Lincoln, Nebraska.

== See also ==
- Friedman
