= Eric Freedman =

Eric Freedman may refer to:

- Eric Freedman (journalist), American journalist and professor at Michigan State University
- Eric M. Freedman, American legal scholar and professor at Hofstra University
- Eric Friedman, American musician and songwriter
- Erick Friedman (1939–2004), violinist
