= Richard Freeman =

Richard Freeman may refer to:

- Richard Freeman (bridge) (1933–2009), bridge player
- Richard Freeman (cryptozoologist) (born 1970), cryptozoologist and author
- Richard Freeman (Irish judge) (1646–1710), Lord Chancellor of Ireland
- R. Austin Freeman (1862–1943), British writer of detective stories
- Richard B. Freeman (born 1943), American economist
- Richard Cameron Freeman (1926–1999), U.S. federal judge
- Richard P. Freeman (1869–1944), U.S. representative from Connecticut
- R. B. Freeman (1915–1986), Darwin bibliographer
- Richard Knill Freeman (1840–1904), British architect
- Richard Freeman (physician) (born 1959/1960), sports physician and doctor
- Richard R. Freeman (1944–2024), American physicist, researcher and author
- Richard Shafle Freeman (1907–1941), United States Army Air Corps officer and pilot

== See also ==
- Richard Friedman (disambiguation) (pronounced Freedman)
