= Ruppin Academic Center =

College in central Israel

Ruppin Academic Center: המרכז האקדמי רופין (Hebrew)
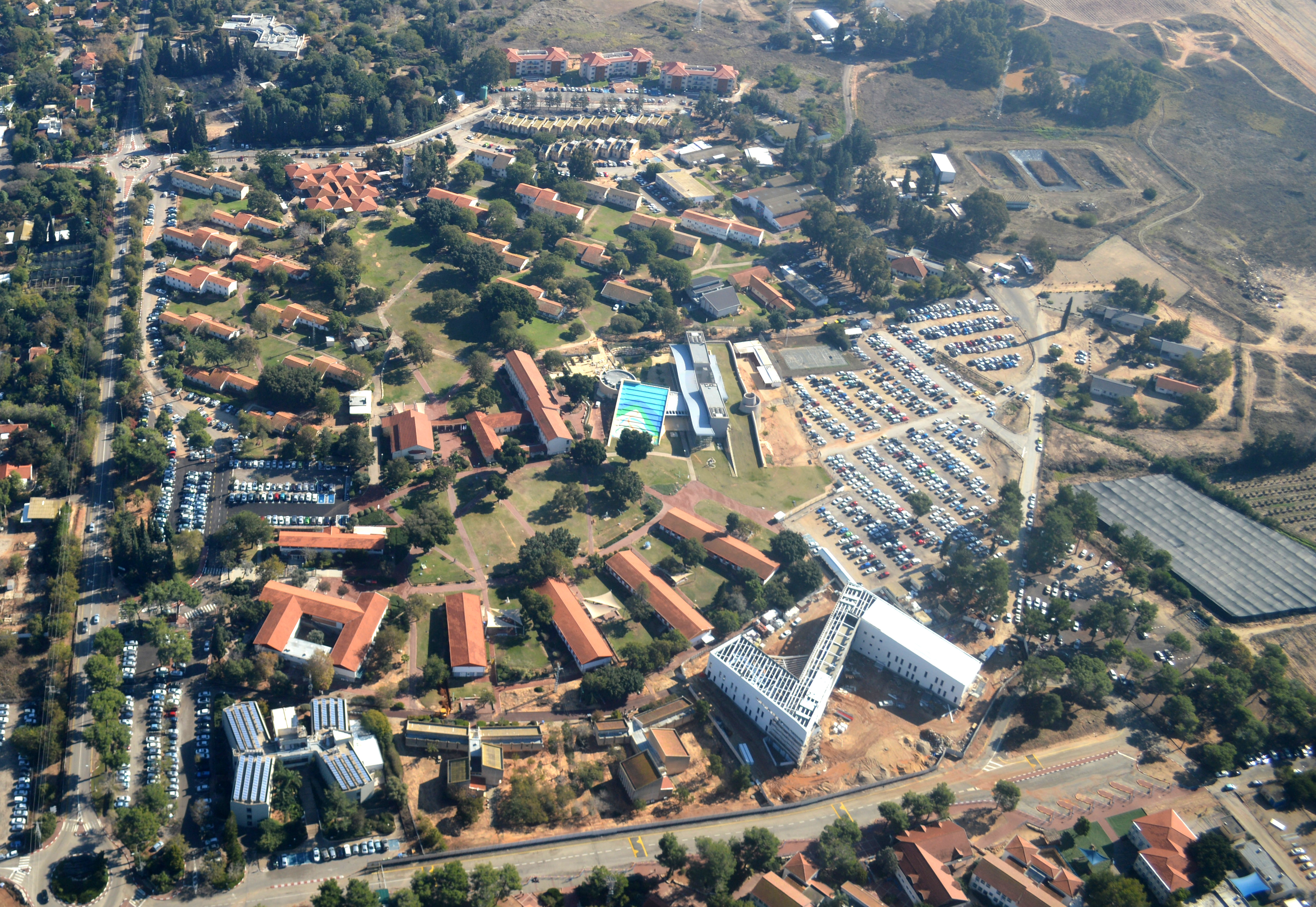

- Location within Central Israel
- Coordinates: 32°20′35″N 34°54′43″E
- Country: Israel
- District: Central
- Subdistrict: HaSharon
- Council: Hefer Valley
- Population (2024): 294
- Website: www.ruppin.ac.il

Ruppin Academic Center (Hebrew: הַמֶרְכָּז הַאָקָדֶמִי רוּפִּין), also known as Ruppin College, is a college in Israel, which has the status of an institutional settlement. It was established in 1949, is named after Arthur Ruppin, and is located near the moshav Kfar Monash, and within the Hefer Valley Regional Council area. In 2015, it had 4,500 students, whilst the village had a population of 294 in 2024.

== History ==
It was originally called "Midreshet Ruppin" and the "Ruppert School", and was established to provide management education in the area of agriculture, the kibbutz, and the moshav. In 2001, it became a public school.

In 2013, Ruppin and Tel Aviv University created a joint multi-disciplinary center with the purpose of training students, with a focus on environmental issues in the Mediterranean Sea. In October 2014, it was announced that Noble Energy would establish a center to train technicians in the energy and natural gas industry at Ruppin with a grant of NIS 12 million.

It has four schools (economics and business administration, social and communal sciences, engineering, and marine sciences) and 15 academic departments, and awards bachelor's and master's degrees.

In 2021 Prof. Aviad Kleinberg was announced Ruppin Academic Center president, replacing Professor Galia Sabar. From October 2025 Professor Mimi Ajzenstadt is the Ruppin Academic Center president.

== Research ==
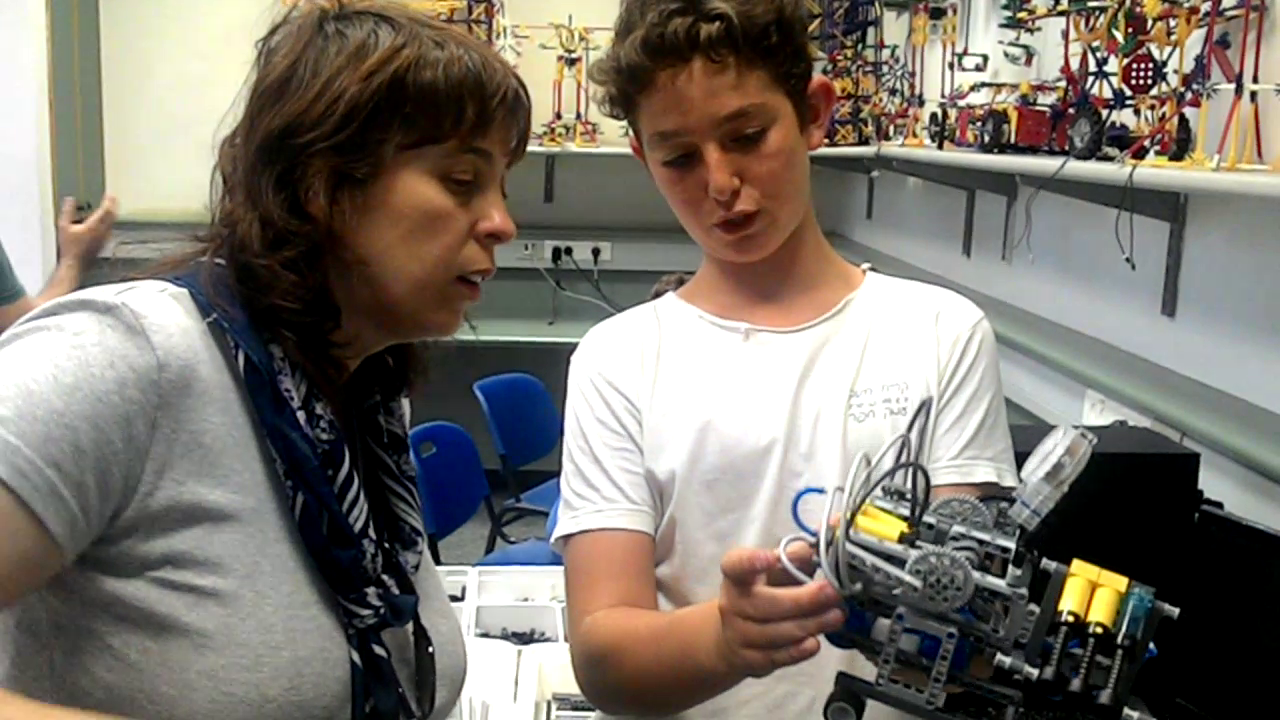
Prof. Dr. Rina Zviel-Girshin Head of Knowledge Engineering and Robotics AI Lab with next generation roboticists

Research laboratories of Ruppin Academic Center:

- Knowledge Engineering and Robotics Lab
- Cognition Lab
- Electro-Optics
- Judgement and Decision Making
- The study of personality and psychopathology
- Laboratory of loss and emotional pain
- Marine Science Laboratories
- The laboratory of materials and neuro-physiological nature and behavior of Cephalopoda

== Marine College of Israel ==
=== History of the School ===
The School of Marine Sciences at the Ruppin Academic Center was founded in 1997 and originally known as the Marine College of Israel. It operated under the academic auspices of the Hebrew University of Jerusalem and its alumni received an undergraduate degree from Hebrew University until 2001. The college was established by Emek Hefer Regional Council Head Rani Idan, former vice president of the Technion, Professor Danny Wolf, Professor Micha Spira of Hebrew University and Daphna Pergament, who headed its administration until 2007. A nonprofit organization operated alongside the college to raise funds for it and guide it toward its goals. The organization's members were experts in various aspects of oceanography hailing from industry, academia, and the military.

In 2003, the college became the third school of the Ruppin Academic Center, joining what were then the School of Social Sciences and Management and the School of Engineering. At that point, its name changed to the School of Marine Sciences and it became an integral part of this public college approved by the Israeli Council for Higher Education (CHE). It receives subsidy through the council's Planning and Budgeting Committee (PBC). The School of Marine Sciences at the Ruppin Academic Center is the only institution in Israel that grants a BSc in marine sciences.

=== School of Marine Sciences at Mikhmoret ===
The school offers two undergraduate programs with CHE accreditation, a BSc in Marine Sciences and Marine Environment and a BSc in Marine Biotechnology. The school also offers two graduate programs with CHE accreditation, an MSc in Marine Sciences and an MA in Marine Resource Management.

== Notable alumni ==
- Danny Ionescu, aquatic microbial ecologist
- Or Sasson (born 1990), judoka
