= Karen Friedman =

Karen Friedman may refer to:

- Karen Friedman Agnifilo (born 1966), American attorney
- Karen Friedman Hill (born 1946), wife of American mobster Henry Hill

== See also ==
- Karen (given name)
- Friedman (surname)
