= Dénes Friedmann =

Hungarian rabbi

Dénes Friedmann (1903–1944) was a Hungarian writer and Chief Rabbi in Újpest (today part of Budapest), Hungary.

He was co-editor of Magyar Zsidó Szemle.

The Nazis killed Friedmann's son in his presence after which he was deported to the Auschwitz concentration camp where he was killed.
