= Aviad Meitar =

Romanian Chairman of Quadrant European Beverages Limited (born 1959)

Aviad Meitar (Hebrew: אביעד מיתר; born 1959) is the Chairman of Quadrant European Beverages Limited, the Pepsi bottler for Bulgaria. He served as Chairman of Quadrant Amorq Bottling Company Limited (QABCL), the exclusive PepsiCo licensee for Romania and Moldova, until its successful sale to PepsiAmericas, the second largest PepsiCo bottler in the world, in July 2006.

Meitar set up QABCL's operation (Pepsi venture) in Romania in 1991 and has had oversight managerial responsibility for the company's operations since.

He has been a senior executive with Quadrant Management, the New York City-based management arm of a private investment fund, for close to 18 years. Prior to setting up QABCL he was responsible for other investments of the fund, and for the review of acquisition candidates.

== Biography ==
Meitar grew up in a small town called Kiryat Ono, in Israel. During his childhood years he studied in the local conservatory and played the french horn in its concert band. This made music a special part of his life and, although he chose a different profession, he has been actively playing with concert bands and symphonic orchestras all these years.

He has a Bachelor of Laws degree from Tel Aviv University School of Law and an MBA from Boston University Graduate School of Management.

Meitar lives in Israel with his wife Ravit and has three children, Yigal, Ayal and Yiftach.
