= Aviad Raz =

Israeli professor of sociology

Aviad Raz (Hebrew: אביעד רז) is an Israeli professor of sociology at Ben-Gurion University of the Negev.

== Academic career ==
Aviad Raz earned his B.Sc. and Ph.D. from Tel-Aviv University. He was a Post-doctoral Fellow at Harvard and held fellowships from the Japan Foundation and the Israeli Academy of Sciences. Aviad Raz was a Visiting AICE Professor at the Department of Sociology, University of California, San Diego in 2012-13.

== Published works ==
- Riding the Black Ship: Japan and Tokyo Disneyland, Harvard University Press (1999). ISBN 978-0-674-76893-2
- Emotions at Work: Normative Control, Organizations, and Culture in Japan and America, Harvard University Press (2002). ISBN 978-0-674-00858-8
- Organizational culture, The Open University of Israel (2004)
- The Gene And The Genie: Tradition, Medicalization, and Genetic Counseling in a Bedouin Community in Israel, Carolina Academic Press (2005). ISBN 978-0-89089-448-4
- Community genetics and genetic alliances: eugenics, carrier testing and networks of risk (Genetics and Society) (2009), Routledge, ISBN 978-0-415-49618-6
