= Bernát Friedmann =

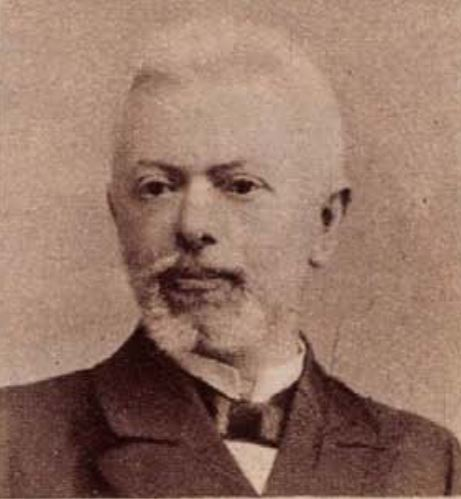
Friedmann Bernát

Bernhard Friedmann, or Friedmann Bernát (10 October 1843 in Oradea – 14 October 1925 in Budapest) was a Hungarian Jewish jurist and criminal lawyer.

He studied law at the "Rechtsakademie" there and at the University of Budapest. He won general sympathy through his manly conduct in connection with the notorious Tisza-Eszlár trial.

== Literary works ==
- Hazai Bányászatunk Nemzetgazdasági és Statisztikai Szempontból, Budapest, 1866;
- A Népbirák és Esküdtszèkek Intezménye, ib. 1876 (which won the grand academical prize);
- A Felebbvitel Bünügyekben Tekintettel a Közvetlen Szóbelisègre, ib. 1878;
- Eszrevètelek a Magyar Bünvádi Eljarási Javaslat Iranyeszméi Felett, 1889;
