= Bourla Theatre =

Theatre in Antwerp

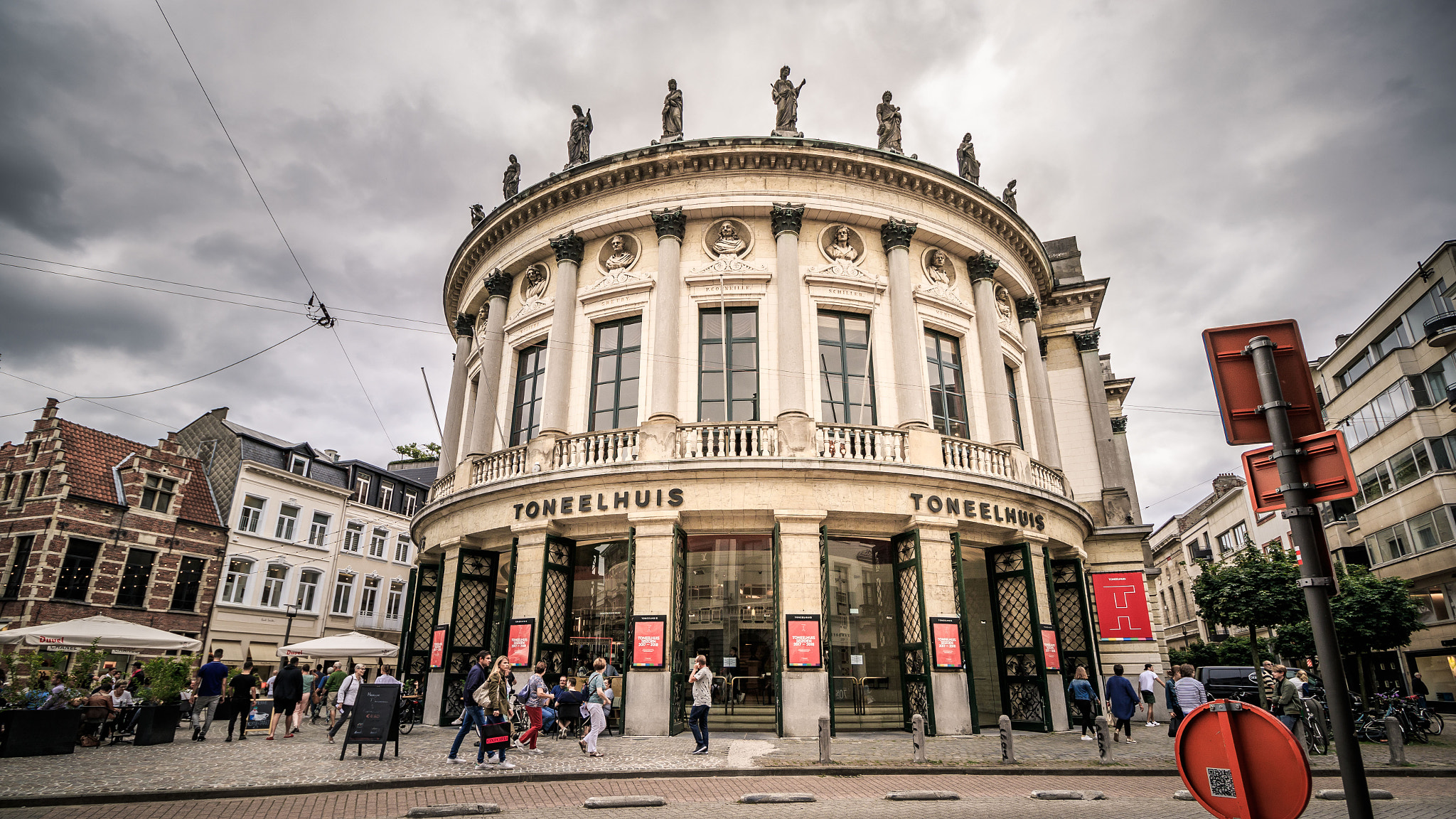
- Interactive map of Bourla Theatre
- Location: Antwerp, Belgium
- Coordinates: 51°12′57″N 4°24′26″E

Construction
- Opened: 1834

Website
- Official website

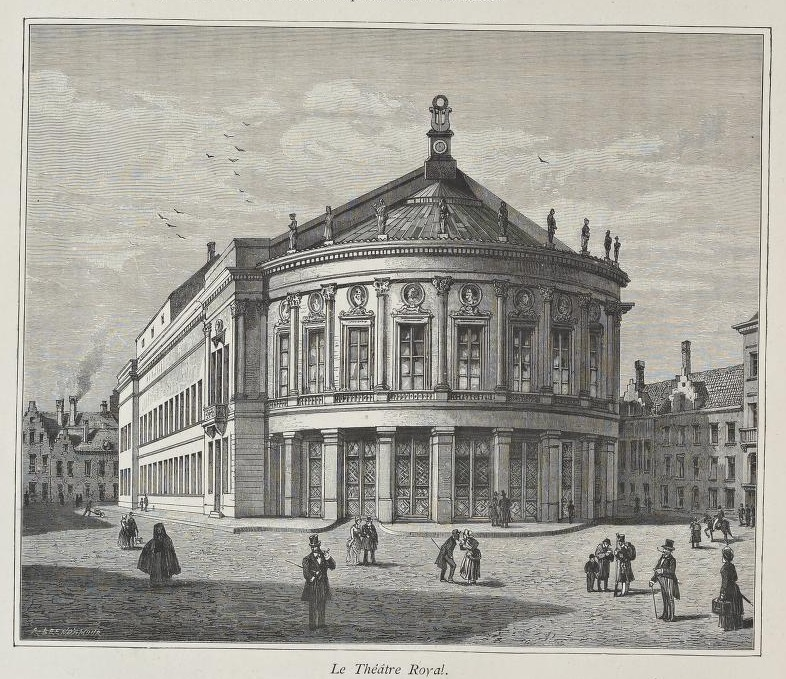
Theatre in 1885

Bourla Theatre (also known as Bourlaschouwburg) is a theatre located in Antwerp that seats around 900. The building is designed in a neoclassical style on the site of the former Tapissierspand tapestry market. The theatre was designed on request from the city in 1827 by the city architect Pierre Bourla. Construction began in 1829, but was delayed due to the Belgian Revolution. The theatre was finally finished in 1834 and opened under the name, Grand Théâtre or Théâtre Royal Français, on account of its ownership by a French company. Presently, the Bourla houses the theatre company Het Toneelhuis, which is a merger of the companies, Koninklijke Nederlandse Schouwburg and Blauwe Maandag Compagnie.

The Bourla is the last remaining municipal theatre in Europe with original stage machinery, which fill five levels above and below the stage. The building has been named a protected building since 1938, and therefore is regarded among the most important historic buildings in Belgium.
