= Pierre Bruno Bourla =

Paris-born Belgian architect

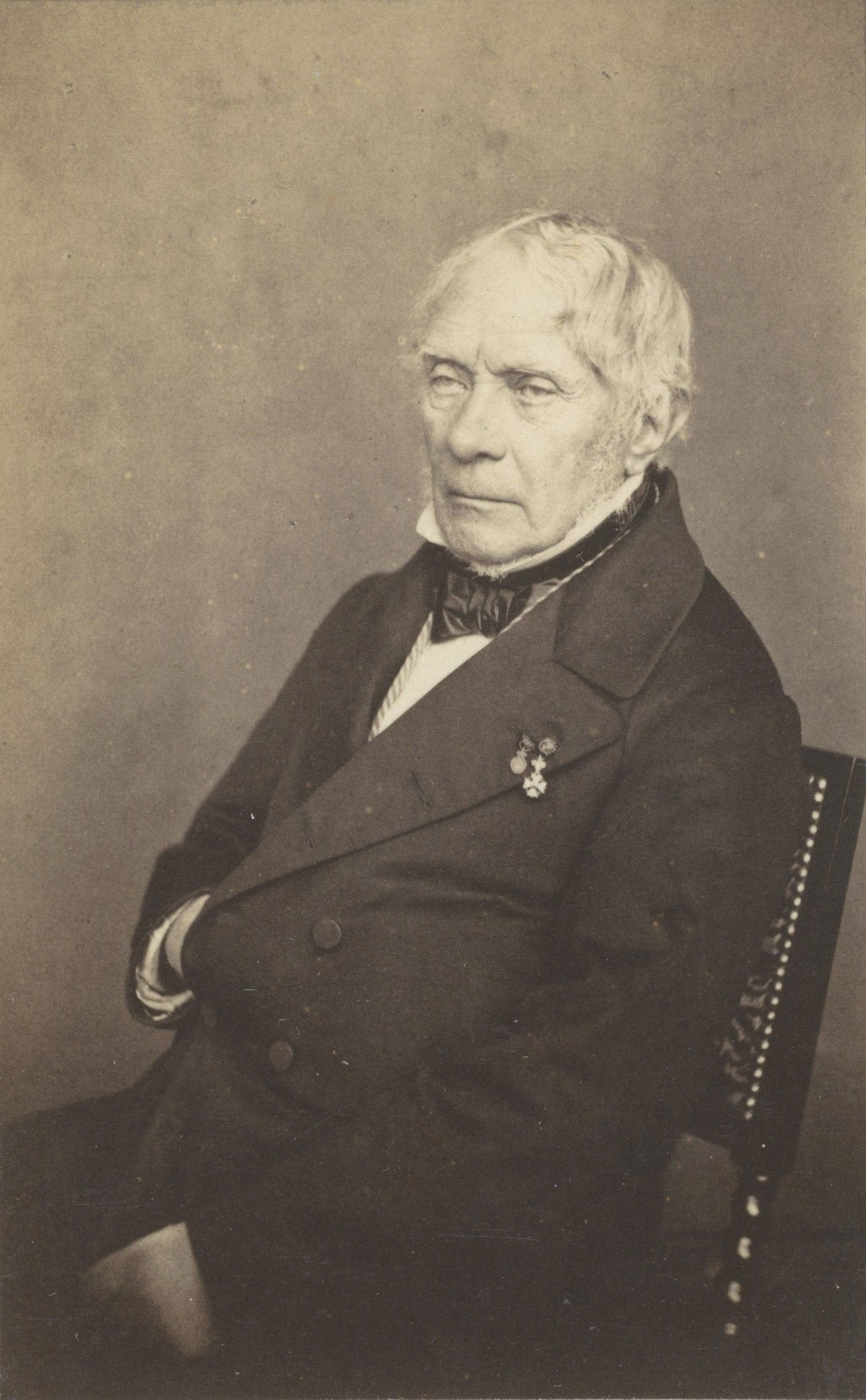
Bourla

Pierre Bruno Bourla (19 December 1783 – 31 December 1866) was a Paris-born Belgian architect. He was the city architect in Antwerp from 1819 to 1861, and a professor of architecture at the Royal Academy of Fine Arts Antwerp. His most famous work is the Royal Theatre built between 1827 and 1834, known popularly after him as the Bourla theatre. He also designed new buildings for the Antwerp Academy, built the entrance gate to the city's botanical gardens, expanded the St. Elizabeth's hospital, restored the cathedral, and renovated the town hall.

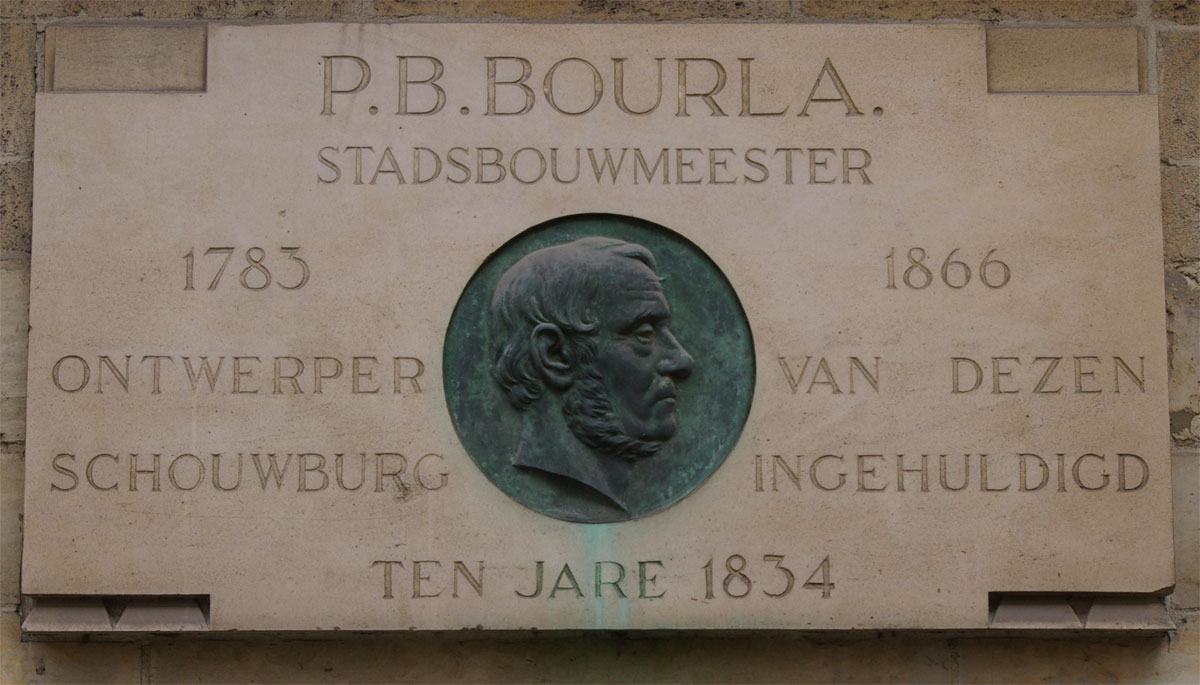
Plaque dedicated to Pierre Bruno Bourla on the south side of his Neoclassical Royal Theatre in Antwerp, built between 1827 and 1834. It is known as the "Bourla theatre" (Bourla Schouwburg)

He died in Antwerp in 1866, and was buried at St. Lawrence's. His body was transferred to the Schoonselhof cemetery in 1930.

== Honours ==
- 1846: Member of the Royal Academy of Science, Letters and Fine Arts of Belgium
- 1840: Knight of the Order of Leopold.

== Gallery ==
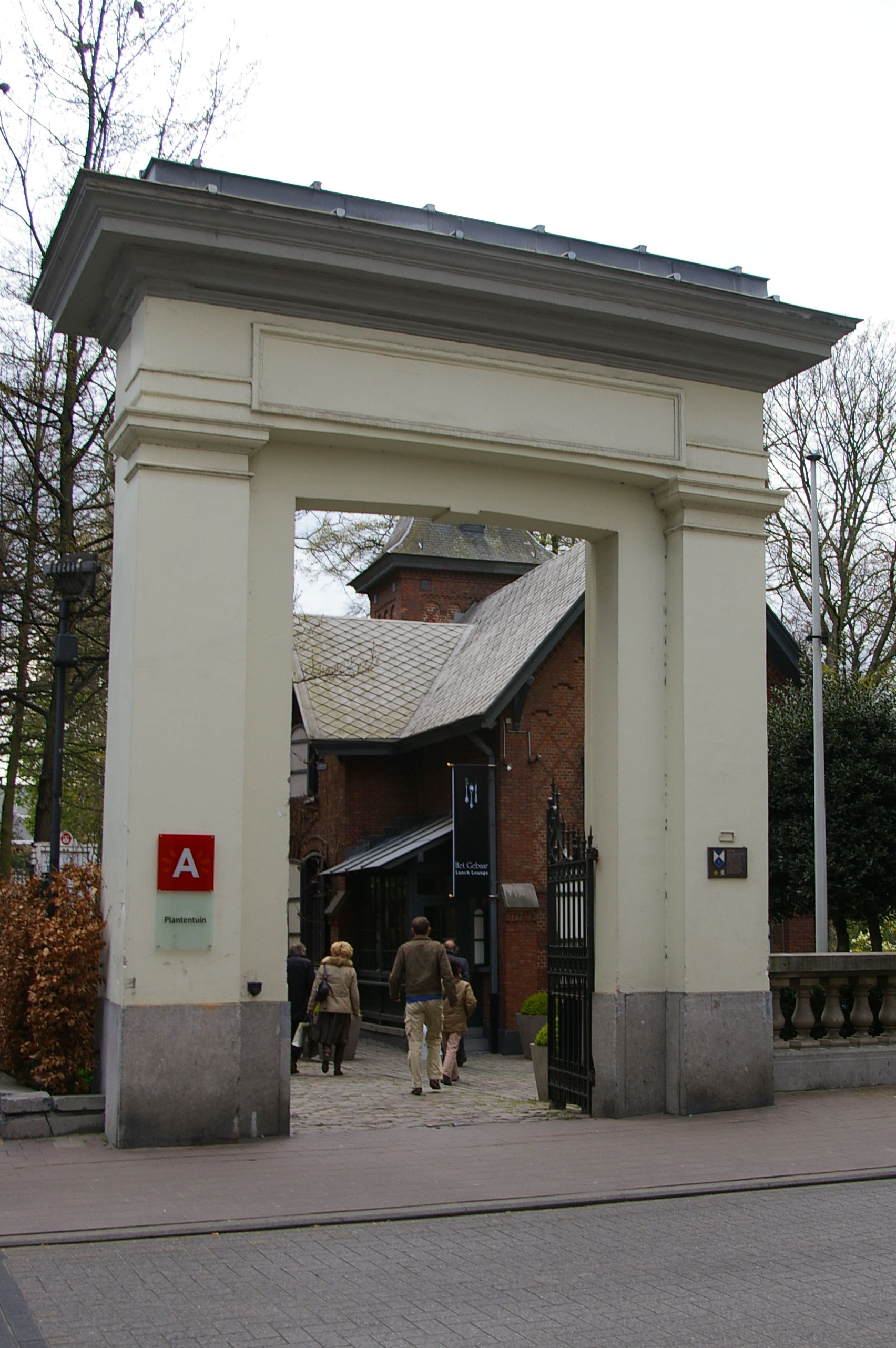
Botanical gardens entrance gate

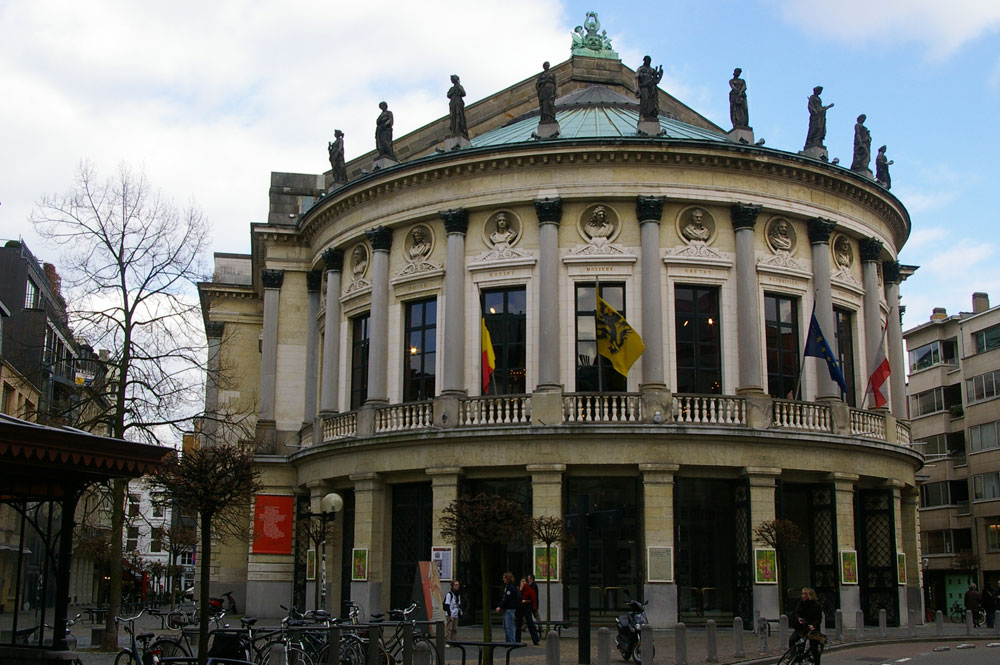
Bourla theatre

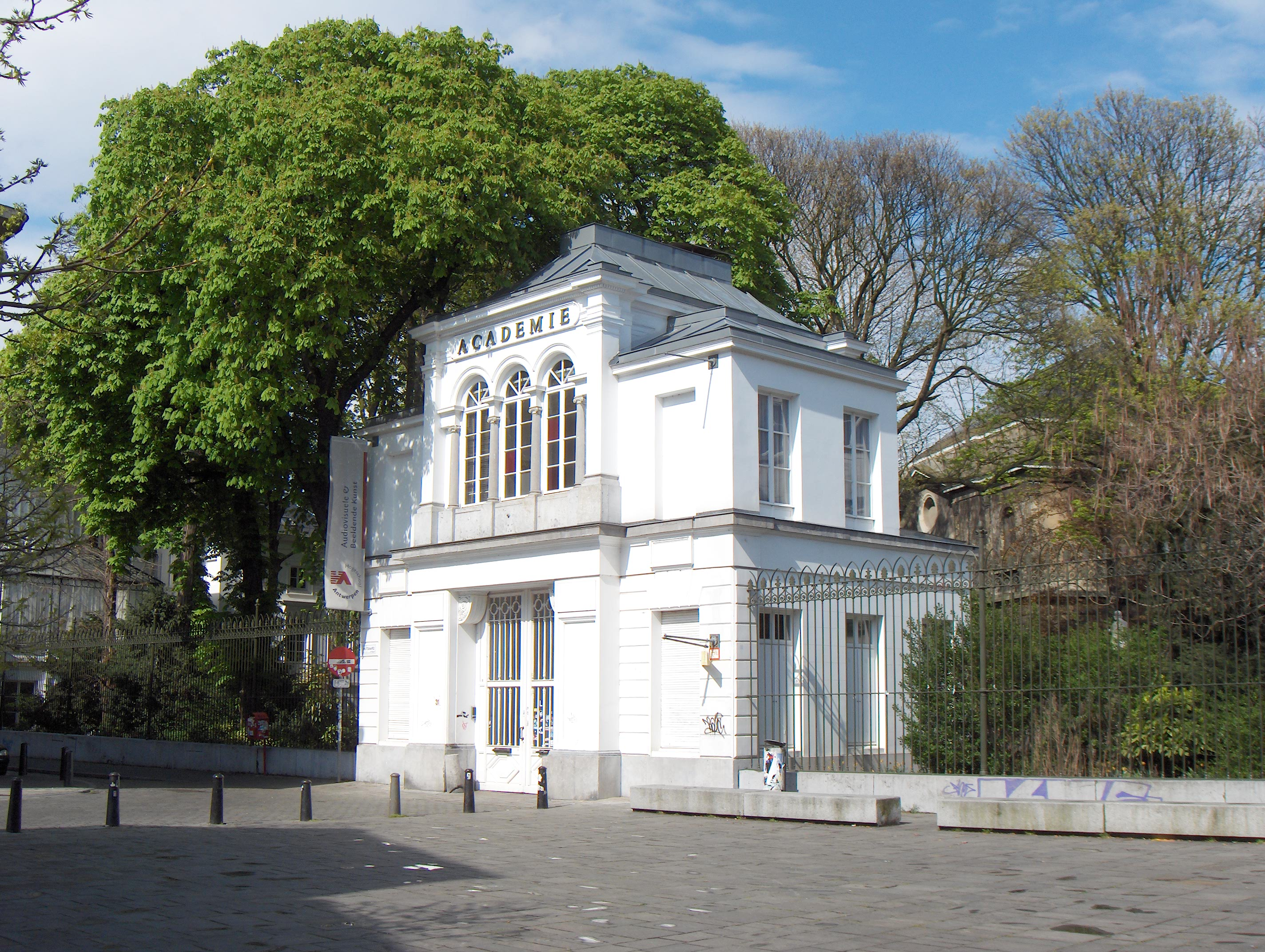
Academy of Fine Arts entrance gate
