= Frieda Friedman =

American author

- Born: 1905; Syracuse, New York
- Education: New York University
- Occupations: Author, editor
- Spouse: Unmarried
- Writing career
- Language: English
- Period: 1946–1969
- Genre: Children's literature
- Notable awards: See text

Frieda Friedman (born 1905, date of death unknown) was a writer of children's literature who, from the mid-1940s to the late 1960s, published several short, illustrated novels primarily intended for preteen and adolescent girls. Her works enjoyed republication and numerous printings through the 1970s, and in some cases until the late 1980s.

== Biography ==
Friedman was born in Syracuse in 1905. After earning a B.S. from New York University, Friedman entered into graduate study at Columbia University and New York University. In the course of her professional career, she was employed by New York American and several other newspapers and magazines. In 1930 she began writing poetry for the Norcross Greeting Card Company, and was eventually promoted to editor.

Friedman lived in New York City, and set some of her fiction there. She wrote often about girls in supportive, working-class or middle-class families. Illustrators of Friedman's work include Valeria Patterson, Carolyn Haywood, Mary Barton, Mary Stevens, Jacqueline Tomes, Vivienne Blake, Ulrike Zehe-Weinberg, Erich Hölle, Leonard Shortall, and (the pseudonymous) Emmo. On three occasions, the New York Herald Tribune Spring Book Festival recognized her work in adolescent fiction with an Honor Choice award: in 1947 for Dot for Short; in 1949 for A Sundae with Judy; and in 1956 for The Janitor's Girl.

Franz Schneider Verlag of Munich published German localisations of some of her titles. Auf Dotty ist Verlaß (1959) is based on Dot for Short (1947), and has new illustrations by Ulrike Zehe-Weinberg; Ellen hat die besten Freunde (1965), illustrated by Erich Hölle, derives from Ellen and the Gang (1963). Scholastic Book Services republished Dot for Short, Carol from the Country, and The Janitor's Girl with new illustrations by Mary Stevens; Carol from the Country is retitled Carol.

== Bibliography ==
1. Bobbie Had a Nickel. A Bonnie Book. Illustrated by Emmo. Kenosha: John Martin's House. 1946. OCLC 7599280.
2. Dot for Short. Illustrated by Carolyn Haywood. New York: William Morrow and Company. 1947. OCLC 1013966.
3. Peppy, the Lonely Little Puppy. Illustrated by Vivienne Blake. Chicago: Rand McNally. 1947. OCLC 1652203.
4. Some Day. A Bonnie Book. Illustrated by Valeria Patterson. Kenosha: Samuel Lowe Company. 1948. OCLC 18377093.
5. Make Believe. A Bonnie Book. Illustrated by Valeria Patterson. Kenosha: John Martin's House. 1948. OCLC 7599273.
6. A Sundae with Judy. A Bonnie Book. Illustrated by Carolyn Haywood. Kenosha: William Morrow and Company. 1949. OCLC 1862567.
7. Carol from the Country. A Bonnie Book. Illustrated by Mary Barton. Kenosha: William Morrow and Company. 1950. OCLC 2353570.
8. Pat and Her Policeman. Morrow Junior Books. Illustrated by Mary Barton. Kenosha: William Morrow and Company. 1953. OCLC 1652476.
9. The Janitor's Girl. Morrow Junior Books. Illustrated by Mary Stevens. Kenosha: William Morrow and Company. 1956. OCLC 300885.
10. Let's Pretend. Kenosha: Samuel Lowe Company. 1959.
11. Ellen and the Gang. Morrow Junior Books. Illustrated by Jacqueline Tomes. Kenosha: William Morrow and Company. 1963. OCLC 300886.
12. Now That You Are 10. Illustrated by Leonard Shortall. New York: Association Press. 1963. OCLC 4861600.
13. When I Grow Up. Kenosha: Samuel Lowe Company. 1969.
