= Nancy Friedemann-Sánchez =

Colombian-American contemporary artist

- Born: 1961 (age 64–65); Bogotá, Colombia
- Other name: Nancy Friedemann
- Education: Universidad de los Andes, Otis College of Art and Design, New York University

Nancy Friedemann-Sánchez (born 1961) is a Colombian-American contemporary artist. She creates works that primarily focus on the nature of human identity and cultural memory, more specifically through the lens of feminism. She is based in Lincoln, Nebraska.

== Biography ==
Friedemann-Sánchez was born to an American father and a Colombian mother in Bogotá, Colombia. Growing up, she recognized the struggles of being bicultural from an early age: "When you’re a child you relate in a feeling kind of way, not so much knowing exactly what is going on. I felt that I belonged and that I didn’t." She learned to apply these feelings into her work later in life.

Friedemann-Sánchez attended La Universidad de los Andes in Bogotá, Colombia from 1982 to 1985. After increasing tensions due to an unnamed civil war, Friedemann-Sánchez left Colombia and moved to the United States. She went on to receive a B.F.A. degree from the Otis Art Institute in Los Angeles, California (1986–94), and an M.F.A. degree from New York University (1997).

She lived in New York City, New York for 21 years, and in 2011 she moved to Lincoln, Nebraska where she is currently based.
