= Pamela Frydman =

- Title: Rabbi

Religious life
- Religion: Judaism
- Organisation: Or Shalom Jewish Community

Pamela Frydman is an American rabbi. She is the founding rabbi of Or Shalom Jewish Community, a San Francisco Jewish Renewal congregation.

== Career ==
Frydman was the first female president of OHALAH (Association of Rabbis for Jewish Renewal).

In 2010, she organized a letter signed by more than 400 rabbis, asking Jerusalem police to protect women at the Western Wall who want to pray and read the Torah together, one year after Nofrat Frenkel was arrested for taking out a Torah in the women's section of the Western Wall Plaza. Frydman is one of the international co-chairs for Rabbis for Women of the Wall.

She is also the director of the Holocaust Education Project at the Academy for Jewish Religion in California.

== See also ==
- Timeline of women rabbis
