= James Friedman =

James Friedman was Professor of Law Emeritus at the University of Maine School of Law.

Friedman, a graduate of Brown University and the University of Chicago Law School, served as a visiting professor at the United States Military Academy at West Point; and the Faculty of Law, University College, Galway Ireland. He was a visiting scholar at the Hebrew University of Jerusalem. In addition he was a post-doctoral fellow and research associate on energy and environmental issues at The Woods Hole Oceanographic Institution, Woods Hole, MA., for three years. He began his teaching career as an assistant professor in the Law and Philosophy Honors Program at Brown University with interests in constitutional law, political philosophy, and philosophy of science.

Friedman's areas of specialty as a law professor included American Constitutional Law, law and philosophy, and legal and ethical issues posed by counterterrorism. Friedman studied British, Irish, Israeli, as well as American responses to terrorist attacks.

In 1988 Trinity College Dublin published Friedman's criticism of the Supreme Court of Ireland for prohibiting a woman's clinic from providing information concerning abortion in England. Friedman argued that the judicial injunction in question violated free speech. See "On the Dangers of Moral Certainty and Sacred Trusts," Dublin University Law Journal (1988).

Friedman published 'Arendt in Jerusalem, Jackson at Nuremberg: Presuppositions of the Nazi War Crimes Trials," in The Israel Law Review, Vol. 28, No. 4, Autumn 1994.

On November 13, 2006, Friedman published a criticism of the Bush administration's argument that it could prevent Guantanamo detainees from testifying in court about the interrogation techniques to which they had been subjected.

In October 2007, Friedman argued in a speech to the New England Conference of Appellate Judges that Congress' Suspension of Habeas Corpus in the Military Commissions Act of 2006 was unconstitutional. In June 2008, The United States Supreme Court upheld this position in Boumediene v. Bush.

On August 14, 2009, Friedman published "Nuremberg and the Torture Memos: An American Dilemma" in JURIST. Friedman argued that U.S. Justice Department lawyers who authored memos justifying torture of American detainees had acted contrary to basic, American values and in violation of principles espoused by the United States at the Nuremberg Trials which followed World War II.

In 2011, Friedman criticized an Israeli anti-boycott law as a violation of free speech. He also returned to research concerning the European Theater of Operations in World War II and to a long-standing interest in Spinoza's Theological-Political Treatise.

Friedman received the Commander's Award for Public Service from the United States Army for his service at West Point, an uncommon award for a visiting professor.

In 2014 Friedman was named professor emeritus by the University of Maine School of Law.
