= Harold Friedman =

Harold Leo Friedman (born 24 March 1923 in Manhattan, New York City; died 16 September 2005 in Stony Brook, Long Island, New York) was an American physical chemist who contributed to the study of thermodynamic properties of fluids with applications in oceanography and physiology.

He received his undergraduate degree and Ph.D in chemistry from the University of Chicago.

He taught at the University of Southern California and worked for I.B.M.'s research center in Yorktown Heights, N.Y before moving to teach at Stony Brook University in 1965. He was chairman of Stony Brook's chemistry department during the 1970s, retiring as a professor emeritus in 1994.Dr. Francis T. Bonner, chairman of Stony Brook's chemistry department from 1958 to 1970, noted the significance of Dr. Friedman's research in understanding the actions of electrolytes.

For thirty years, Dr. Friedman was a chemistry professor at the State University of New York at Stony Brook. He was fascinated with the composition of water as well as the movement of particles and electrical charges in chemical solutions known as electrolytes. Among other disciplines and applications, the literature on physiology and oceanography regarded his findings as crucial. In 1962, he published a book named Ionic Solution Theory, which detailed his research.

In 1987 he was elected a Fellow of the American Physical Society "for pioneering work in the theory of the statistical mechanics of ionic solutions and in the application of the theory of experimental observables". In 1988, he was awarded the Robinson Medal of the Royal Society of Chemistry's Faraday Division.

On September 16, 2005, Harold L. Friedman died of Parkinson's disease complications, aged 82, in the Long Island State Veterans Home in Stony Brook, New York.

== Works ==
- Ionic Solution Theory, ISBN 978-0470280508,1962
- A Course In Statistical Mechanics, ISBN 978-0131845657, 1988
