= Friedrich Franz Friedmann =

German medical researcher (1876–1953)

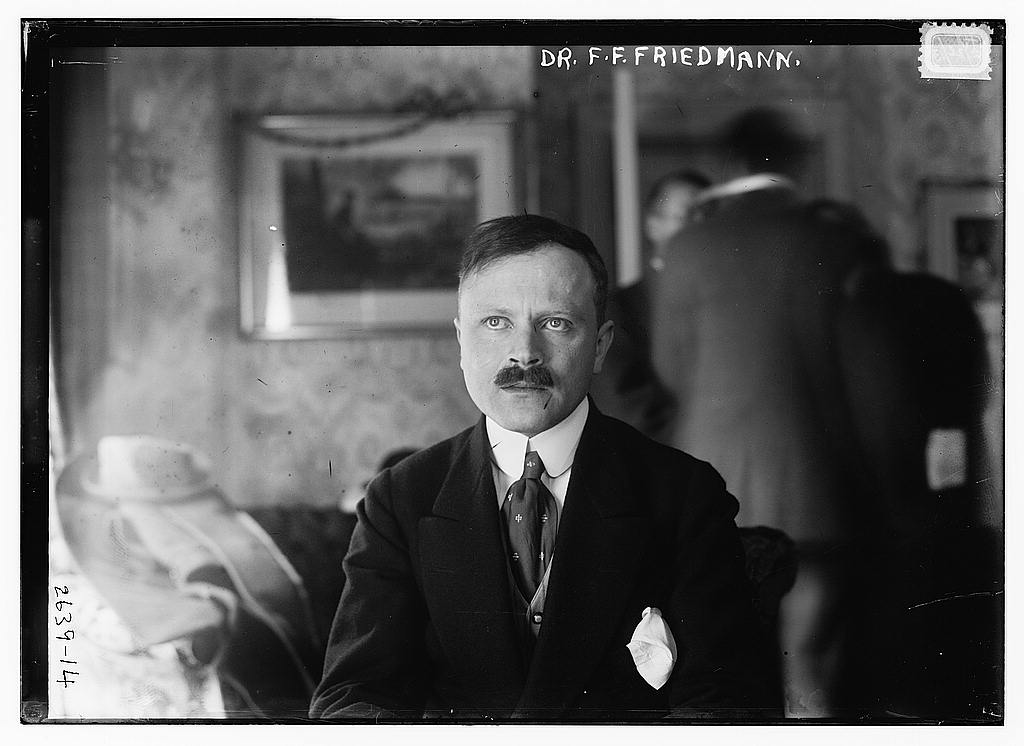
Friedmann in 1913

Friedrich Franz Friedmann (October 26, 1876 – February 19, 1953) was a tuberculosis researcher in Berlin who came to New York City to give what he called the "turtle vaccine" to people who came to his clinic in 1913. He claimed to have developed a strain capable of providing immunity, by passing the strain through turtles.

== Biography ==
He was born on October 26, 1876, in Berlin. He arrived in the United States in 1913 with his secretary, Charles de Vidal Hundt, his assistant, Dr. Harry Benjamin, and his brother, Arthur C. H. Friedmann. He sold the American rights to the cure for $125,000 in cash to set up thirty-six Friedrich F. Friedmann Institutes that were to be in thirty-six states. The New York City Board of Health rejected his claims and the clinic was closed. He died on February 19, 1953, in Monte Carlo.
