= Aviad Kleinberg =

Israeli professor and historian (born 1957)

- אביעד קליינברג
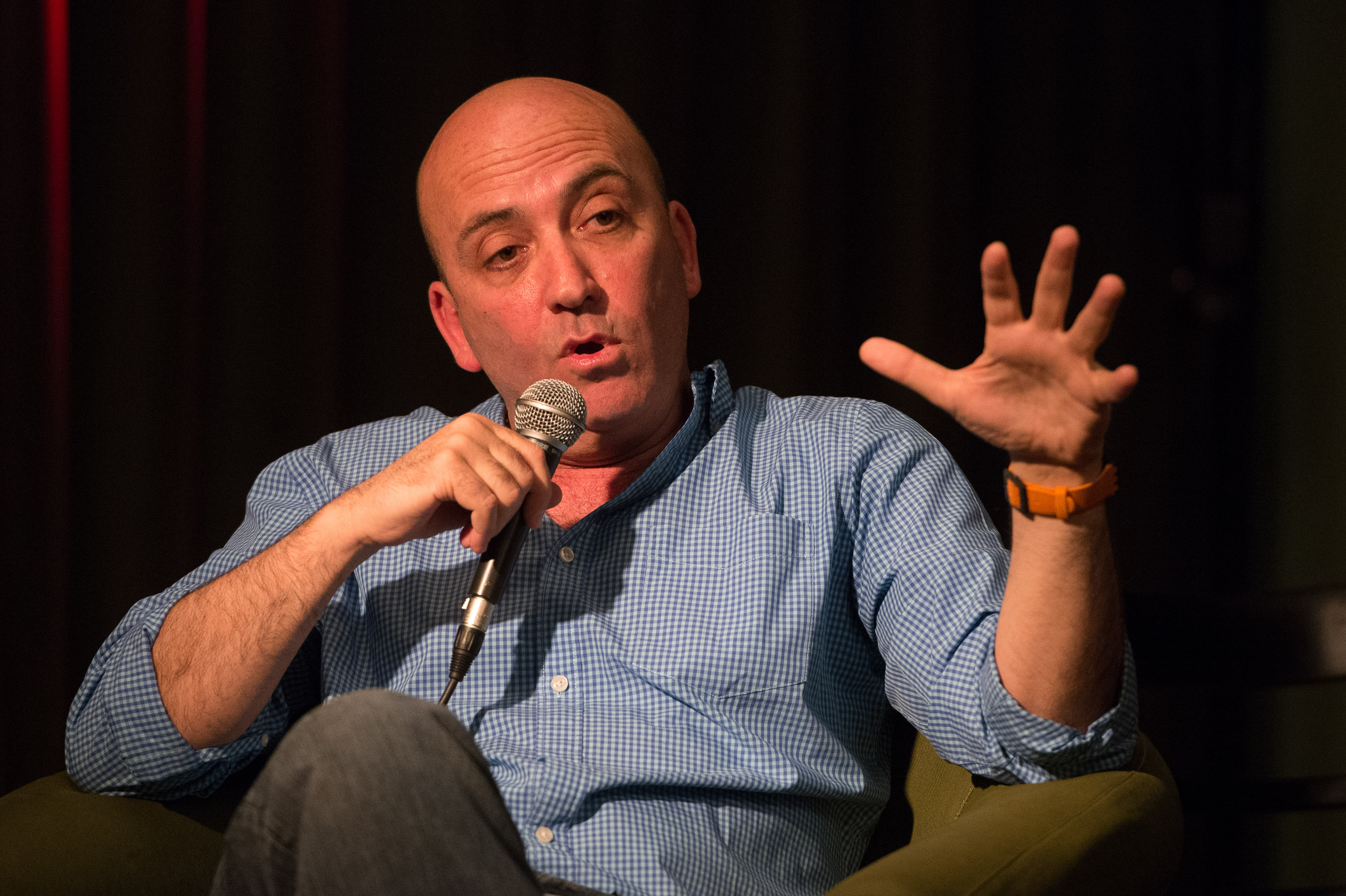
- Kleinberg in 2014
- Born: 25 November 1957 (age 68); Beersheba
- Occupations: Israeli historian & President of the Ruppin Academic Center

Aviad Kleinberg (Hebrew: אביעד קליינברג; born November 25, 1957) is an Israeli historian whose academic work focuses on religious phenomena from Late Antiquity to the Reformation.

As of 2023, he is president of the Ruppin Academic Center in Israel.

He is the member of Dan David Prize Board. The award is administered by Tel Aviv University.

== Early life and education ==
Born and raised in Beersheba, Aviad Kleinberg completed his BA in history at Tel Aviv University (1982) and his PhD in medieval studies at the University of Toronto. His doctoral thesis, under the supervision of Brian Stock, studied the making of saintly reputation from the 12th-15th centuries.

== Academic career ==
From 1990 to 2021, he was professor of medieval history at the department of History, Tel Aviv University.

Between 2015 and 2019, he was head of the Zvi Yavetz School of Historical Studies.

Between 2001 and 2021, he was Director of Tel Aviv University Press.

In 2021, he was elected president of the Ruppin Academic Center.

== Publishing career ==
His first book, Prophets in Their Own Country (1992) is based on his thesis. It examines the interaction between would-be saints and their audiences. He argues that sainthood as a social fact is found in the dynamic dialogue between a claimant and his or her interlocutors and is not a personal quality that can be understood outside what he calls "the saintly interaction".

In a later book, Flesh Made Word (2008), he moved from studying live interactions to the role of stories in creating a saintly repertoire. He argued that saints' stories are often used to "domesticate" living saints, by offering an impossibly successful model of sainthood. No saint can live up to the expectations created by hagiography, hence the saint is driven to collaborate with hagiographical creators who can strengthen his or her reputation by making him fit the inflated model. This creates a "debt" that can be used by the producers of stories in their interactions with saintly aspirants. The book also looks at the phenomenon of the tendency of stories to stretch the limits of "orthodox" sainthood.

Other major works include A Guide for the Non Believer (2019) and A Short Guide to the Western Middle Ages (2020).

Kleinberg is a public intellectual who often expresses himself on public issues. For many years he has written a weekly column in "Yedioth Ahronoth", a national newspaper in Israel, and also in haaretz. He also publishes a blog called "Shock hametziut" (Reality Shock).

== Publications ==
- A Short Guide to the Western Middle Ages (2020)
- A Guide for the Non Believer (2019)
- The Sensual God: How the Senses Make the Almighty Senseless (NY, Columbia University Press, 2015).
- Le Dieu sensible. Bibliothèque des Idées. Gallimard, 2018.
- Flesh Made Word: Saints' Stories and the Western Imagination (Cambridge, Mas. Harvard U. P., Belnknap, 2008)
- Histoires de Saints: Leur rôle dans la formation de l'Occident. Bibliothèque des Histoires. Gallimard, Paris, 2005, 358 pp.
- Seven Deadly Sins: A Very Partial List (Cambridge Mas. Harvard U. P., Belknap, 2008).
- Prophets in Their Own Country: Living Saints and the Making of Sainthood in the Later Middle Ages. Chicago, The University of Chicago Press, 1992. (paperback, 1997)
- A Hebrew Translation of St. Augustine's Confessions, Tel Aviv, 2001.
- Resurrection: Israel's First Fifty Years [Hebrew] Tel Aviv, 1998
- Christianity: A Study of Its History from Its Beginning to the Reformation. (Hebrew) Tel Aviv, 1995.
