= Aviad Frydman =

Israeli physicist

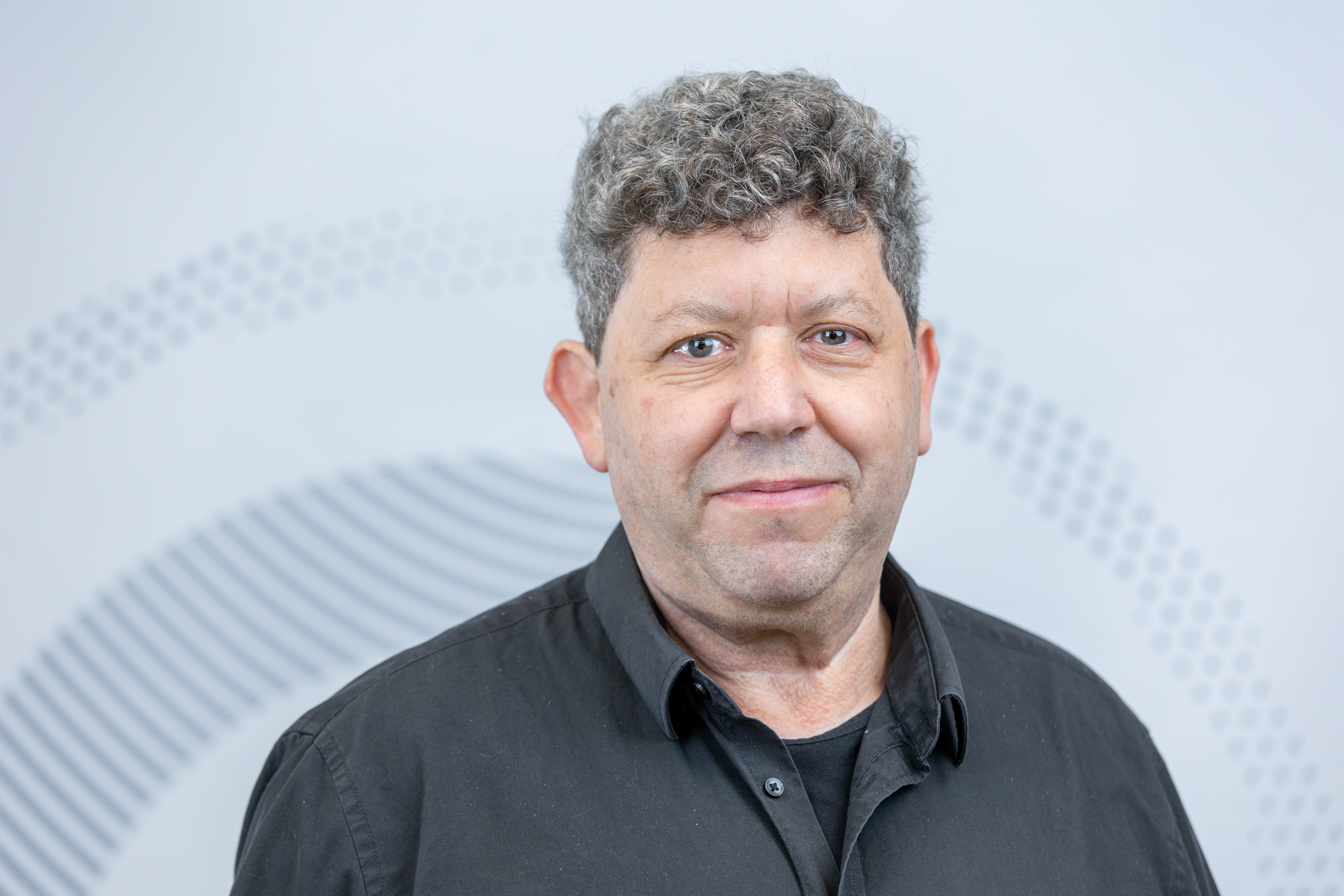
Aviad Frydman

Aviad Frydman (Hebrew: אביעד פרידמן; born February 9, 1964) is a professor in the Department of Physics, Bar-Ilan University, Ramat-Gan, Israel. He was Chairman of the Department of Physics between 2022 and 2025, and is Dean of the Faculty of Exact Sciences since 2025.

His research focuses on the experimental study of electronic properties in low dimensional and disordered systems.

== Biography ==
Aviad Frydman was born in Melbourne, Australia. He graduated from the Hebrew University of Jerusalem with Highest Distinction. He performed his postdoctoral research at the University of California, San Diego, working with Robert C. Dynes. In 1999 he obtained an academic position at Bar-Ilan University where he became a full professor in 2013. During 2006 and 2007 he was a visiting professor in Yale University. From 2012 to 2013 he served as a visiting professor in the Institut Néel, France, and in 2021 to 2022 he was a visiting professor at Cambridge University in the UK. During 2015 to 2017 he served as a chair of excellence, LANEF, Grenoble. In 2022 he was elected as chair of the Physics Department at Bar-Ilan University. In 2025 he was elected dean of the Faculty of Exact Sciences in the same university.

== Research interests ==
Aviad Frydman's research group focuses on the electronic properties of low dimensional disordered systems.

Electrons in solids behave as quantum waves which may interact and interfere. The quantum electronic nature, which becomes important in reduced dimensionality and low temperatures, has a significant influence on properties such as electric conductivity, magneto-transport and density of states. Frydman's lab studies the interplay between geometry, dimensionality, disorder and electronic properties of solid state systems. Using advanced nano-fabrication techniques, high precision electric measurements and low temperature techniques they study the properties of different nano-systems such as ultrathin films, nanowires, granular films and quantum dots focusing on disordered metals, Superconductors and ferromagnets.

== Main contributions ==
Frydman has made several major contributions to the understanding of the electronic properties of disordered systems in two main areas. The first is the field of "disordered superconductors". In 2013 his group were the first to measure a superconducting gap in the insulating phase of disordered systems. In 2015, Frydman's group, together with collaborators from Germany, US, India and Israel, identified the superconducting analogue of the "Higgs Particle" (The god particle). This work received much attention as it offered a low-cost laboratory experiment for understanding one of the great discoveries of the past decade. In 2017, together with French collaborators, Frydman's group conducted the most sensitive thermal measurements on low dimension superconductors. Using a "nano-trampoline" they were able to study quantum criticality at ultra-low temperatures. This was followed by a seminal work in 2018 in which Frydman and Kalisky from Bar Ilan University succeeded in "viewing" quantum fluctuations (bubbles) using an ultra-sensitive magnetic imaging device.

The second research focus has been "strongly interacting electronic insulators" about which he wrote a book titled The Electron Glass together with Michael Pollak and Miguel Ortuno. Frydman's group also identified a new multi-period structure in nanoparticle based quantum dots which makes them potential elements for future nano-sized circuit elements.
