= Richard A. Friedman =

American clinical psychiatrist

Richard Alan Friedman is professor of clinical psychiatry at Weill Cornell Medical College, attending psychiatrist at NewYork–Presbyterian Hospital and director of psychopharmacology at the Payne Whitney Psychiatric Clinic. He is an expert in the pharmacologic treatment of personality, mood and anxiety disorders, obsessive–compulsive disorder, PTSD and refractory depression.

== Career ==
Friedman earned a B.A. in 1978 from Duke University and his M.D. in 1982 from Robert Wood Johnson Medical School of the University of Medicine and Dentistry of New Jersey.

In the 1980s, he was a psychiatrist at Payne Whitney Psychiatric Clinic and is a professor at Weill Cornell Medical College.

== Research ==
Friedman has authored publications in the American Journal of Psychiatry, The New England Journal of Medicine and the Journal of the American Medical Association, among others.

In 2014, Friedman's research activity was in the field of chronic depression, evaluating antidepressant medications, studying the effectiveness of long-term treatment; neurobiology and the social and occupational impairments. He conducted a clinical study of medication for "double depression" (dysthymia with major depression), and evaluated the role of serotonin in chronic depression. He plans a study simultaneously examining brain activity with MRI, behavior, and serotonin functions in patients with chronic depression.

== Journalism ==
Since spring 2015, Friedman has been a contributing op-ed writer at The New York Times, writing about mental health, addiction, human behavior and neuroscience. He has also been a longstanding contributor to the science section of The New York Times since 2002. In 2011, he contributed to The New York Review of Books.

== Personal life ==
In 2014, the Financial Times reported that Friedman had been practicing transcendental meditation technique for three years. He was quoted as saying, "I am less reactive to small things that would have bothered and upset me in the past. ... I'm more easygoing."
