= Aviad Bourla =

Israeli footballer

Aviad Bourla אביעד בורלא
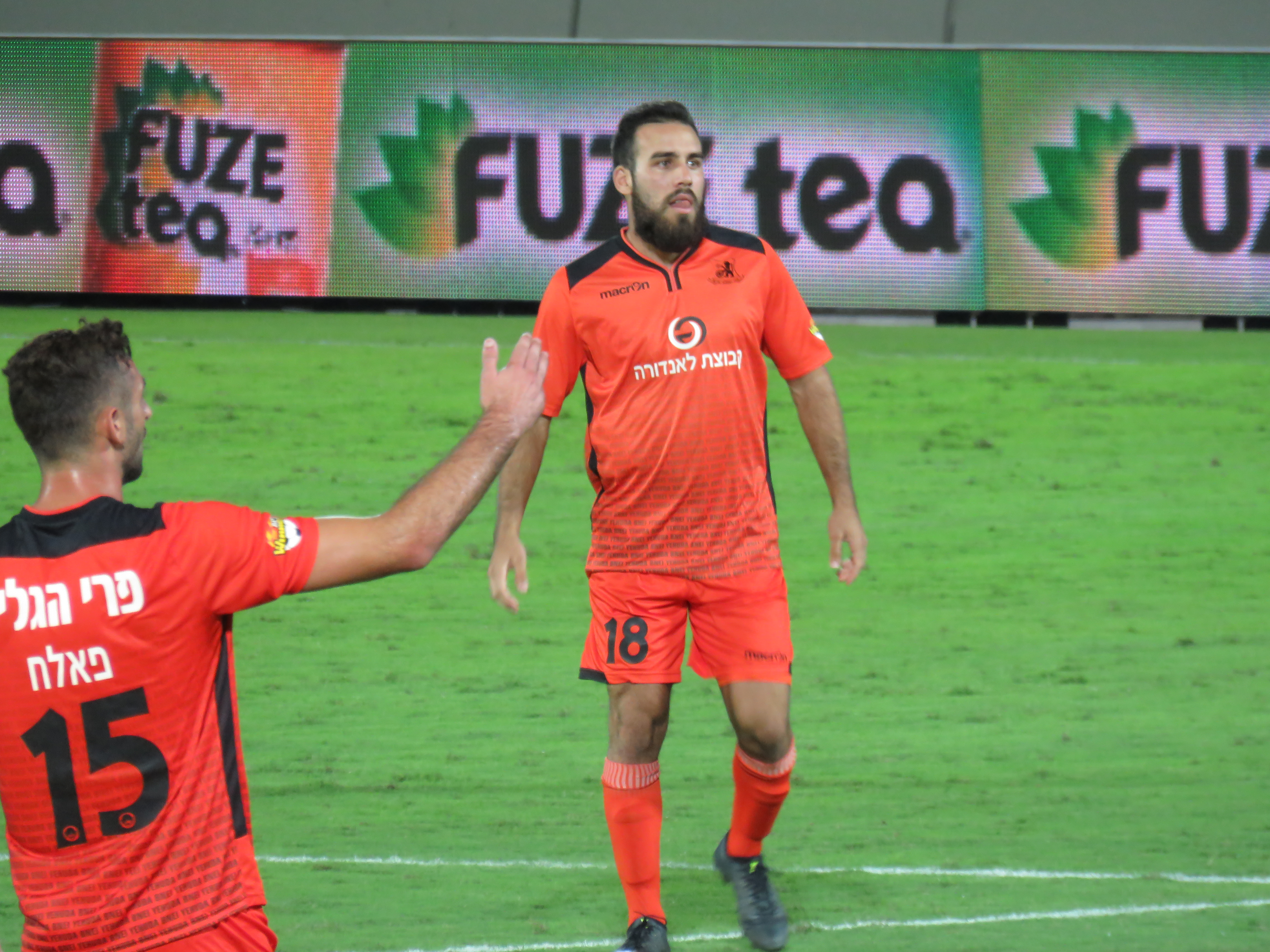
- Bourla playing for Bnei Yehuda in 2015

Personal information
- Full name: Aviad Bourla
- Date of birth: December 13, 1993 (age 32)
- Place of birth: Holon, Israel
- Position: Defensive midfielder

Youth career
- Bnei Yehuda Tel Aviv

Senior career*
| Years | Team | Apps | (Gls) |
| 2012–2017 | Bnei Yehuda | 57 | (1) |
| 2016 | → Maccabi Netanya | 6 | (0) |
| 2016–2017 | → Hapoel Petah Tikva | 27 | (2) |
| 2018–2020 | Hapoel Marmorek | 43 | (2) |
| 2020 | Maccabi Herzliya | 15 | (0) |
- * Club domestic league appearances and goals

Aviad Bourla (Hebrew: אביעד בורלא) is an Israeli footballer playing for Maccabi Herzliya.
