= Eric M. Freedman =

American legal scholar

Eric Mark Freedman

Academic background
- Education: Yale University (BA, JD); Victoria University of Wellington (MA)

Eric Mark Freedman is an American legal scholar and Siggi B. Wilzig Distinguished Professor of Constitutional Rights at Hofstra University. Previously he was Maurice A. Deane Distinguished Professor of Constitutional Law.

== Education ==
- Yale Law School, 1977 - 1979. J.D., 1979.
- Columbia University Law School, 1976 - 1977.
- Victoria University of Wellington (New Zealand), 1976. Wrote thesis on the history of New Zealand pension law. M.A. in History awarded 1977.
- Yale University, 1972 - 1975. B.A., 1975. Double major in History and English.
- Princeton University, 1971 - 1972.
- The Phillips Exeter Academy, 1968 - 1971. Classical Diploma, 1971.
