= Richard L. Friedman =

American real estate developer

- Born: 1940
- Other name: Dick Friedman
- Education: B.A. Dartmouth College
- Occupation: Real estate developer
- Children: 2

Richard L. Friedman is a United States real estate developer involved in multiple business, civic, and charitable endeavors. Friedman is the president and CEO of Carpenter & Company, Inc. of Cambridge, Massachusetts, a private firm involved in real estate and private investments. Carpenter specializes in hotel development.

In 2000, President Bill Clinton appointed Friedman as chairman of the National Capital Planning Commission. In 2010, Friedman was appointed by President Barack Obama to the President’s Export Council. From May 2013 until January 1, 2020, Friedman was a director of Four Seasons Hotels and Resorts. In June 2014, The Boston Globe reported that Friedman was developing a $700 million, 61-story Four Seasons Hotel and Private Residences One Dalton Street in Boston's Back Bay. The building is the tallest building to be built in New England in the last 40 years.

== Early life and education ==
Friedman was born in 1940 and raised in Brookline, Massachusetts, In 1963, Friedman graduated from Dartmouth College where he was a member of the ski team. After graduating, Friedman served as a Second Lieutenant in the Signal Corps the United States Army. From 1965 to 1971, he was the head coach of the Harvard College ski team.

== Career ==
Friedman is the president and the chief executive officer of Carpenter and Company, Inc. At Carpenter, Friedman has developed dozens of real estate projects, including hotels, office buildings, and shopping centers. One of Friedman's most notable projects is the development of the Liberty Hotel in Boston, Massachusetts, located in the former Charles Street Jail, and a historic landmark listed on the National Register of Historic Places. Other notable projects include the St. Regis Hotel San Francisco, Charles Square and the Charles Hotel in Harvard Square, the Brookline Marriott Courtyard in Brookline, Massachusetts, and numerous Hyatt hotels. Friedman was appointed by President Clinton as chairman of the National Capital Planning Commission and led its Interagency Security Task Force. The National Capital Planning Commission is the federal government’s central planning agency for Washington, D.C. and portions of Maryland and Virginia. In 2010, Friedman was appointed by President Obama to the President’s Export Council, where he served as the Vice Chairman of the Subcommittee on Manufacturing and Services.

Friedman has also been extensively involved in civic and charitable endeavors including the Steppingstone Foundation, Mount Auburn Foundation, and the John F. Kennedy Presidential Library & Museum.

The Boston Globe reported in June, 2014 that Friedman was building a new Four Seasons Hotel and Private Residences One Dalton Street project in Boston. One Dalton is New England's tallest residential building and has transformed the Boston skyline.

In March 2015, a team led by Friedman was selected to redevelop the former New Orleans World Trade Center into the Four Seasons Hotel and Private Residences New Orleans.

Friedman's firm, Carpenter, is currently developing a 250-room, $160 million EDITION Hotel in Reykjavik, Iceland.

== Liberty Hotel and Charles Hotel ==
The Liberty project has received numerous accolades including:

- Modernization Awards Grand Prize, Building magazine
- Gold Key for Excellence, Interior Design and HOTELS magazines
- Preservation Award, Massachusetts Historical Commission
- Preservation Award, Bostonian Society
- Achievement Award, Boston Preservation Alliance
- Preservation Award, Victorian Society of America
- Judges’ Award, National Housing & Rehabilitation Association
- Awards for Excellence Finalist, Urban Land Institute
- Development of the Year Finalist, Americas Lodging Investment Summit
- Gold List, Conde Nast Traveler
- Best Business Hotel, Travel + Leisure
- Reader’s Choice Award: Top Hotels, Conde Nast Traveller
- Best New Business Hotels, Fortune magazine
- Hot List, Conde Nast Traveller
- Sexiest Hotels in America, ForbesTraveller

== Honors, affiliations, and awards ==
- From 2000-2004, Friedman served as chairman of the National Capital Planning Commission
- In 2010, Friedman was appointed as co-chairman of the President's Export Council by President Barack Obama
- Friedman was a longtime member of the U.S. House of Representatives speaker Nancy Pelosi’s Speakers Cabinet
- Friedman served as the national finance co-chair for the Chris Dodd for President Campaign
- Friedman is an overseer of the Mount Auburn Hospital located in Cambridge, Massachusetts
- Friedman’s St. Regis San Francisco project was named Development of the Year (2005)by the Americas Lodging Investment Summit
- Friedman was named Man of the Year by the Boston Preservation Alliance
- Friedman was named Real Estate Executive of the Year by the New England Real Estate Journal
- Friedman was named Man of the Year by the Steppingstone Foundation
- Friedman received the Good Scout Award from Boston Minuteman Council of the Boy Scouts of America
- Friedman was the Man of the Year of the Rogerson Communities
- Friedman received a Certificate of Appreciation Award from the Dean of Harvard Business School in recognition of his support of the 2019 MBA Immersive FIELD Course in Boston.
- In March 2020, Friedman received the first Icon Award from Boston University School of Hospitality.

== Personal life ==
Boston Magazine listed Friedman as one of Boston’s most powerful people. Friedman’s summer home on Martha's Vineyard served as the summer White House for President Clinton and family for eight visits between 1993 and 2000. He has two children. Friedman is a member of the Screen Actors Guild and has performed in a number of Hollywood movies.
