= Andorra–France border =

International border

Border between Andorra, France and Spain.

The Andorra–France border extends for 57 km (35 mi) in southern France (Ariège and Pyrenees-Orientales départements) and northern and north-eastern Andorra.

The border is France's third-shortest, after its borders with Monaco and the Kingdom of the Netherlands (the latter on the Caribbean island of Saint Martin).

== Specifications ==
The border's western extremity starts at the western Andorra–Spain–France tripoint, located at the summit of the Pic de Médécourbe (42°36'13"N 1°26'33" E). It then follows a general north-east direction before switching south-eastwards to the eastern Andorra–Spain–France tripoint 42°30'09"N 1°43'33" E).

Most of the Franco-Andorran border is determined by custom – there is no international treaty formally fixing the course of the border, except for the cases below.

In 2001, a bilateral treaty between France and Andorra rectified and amended the border slightly. It provided for the exchange of two equal plots of land of 15,925 m^{2} (4 acres) each, to enable Andorra to construct on its assigned plot a viaduct linking the Envalira tunnel to the French RN22.

The French town of Porta, in the Pyrénées-Orientales département, challenged the land swap at the Judicial Division of the French Council of State, contesting that it was contrary to French Constitution: it claimed not to have been consulted before the border treaty was drafted and approved. The Council of State dismissed the application, ruling that the treaty had been ratified by law and that therefore it was not for the Council to rule on the legality of the law. Moreover, there is no legal requirement for the state to consult with municipalities adjoining a border when adjusting the border. In May 2015 the European Commission adopted a cooperation programme to improve environmental protection along Andorra's borders with Spain and France.

== Border controls ==
There are some, probably minor, checks at the border, as Andorra is neither in the Schengen Area nor in the European Union. Prior to 2017, most European passport holders were subject only to minimum visual passport checks when entering and leaving the Schengen Area, taking less than 5 seconds. Following several terrorist attacks in Europe, the Schengen Borders Code was amended in 2017 to require that the passports of all travellers (including those entitled to free movement between the two countries concerned) be machine-scanned upon entering and leaving the Schengen Area to check against various criminal databases. This process can take up to 30 seconds per traveller and has led to long delays at all borders between Schengen and non-Schengen countries, both at airports and at road and rail borders.

The only road border between the two countries is east of Pas de la Casa, at nearly 2,000 metres (6,600 ft) above sea level. Here it may be possible to get a souvenir passport stamp if one asks at the Andorra border post. There is no rail crossing point, though a bus service connects the Pas de la Casa to the train station in the French border town of L'Hospitalet-près-l'Andorre).

Helicopters may fly between Andorra and non-Andorran airports with international border control facilities. The most frequent flights connect Andorra with the airports in Barcelona and Toulouse.

There is an agreement signed in 2003 between France, Spain and Andorra on the movement and residence in Andorra of citizens of third countries. It stipulates that the three countries must coordinate their visa requirements (in practice, that Andorra adopt the Schengen visa requirements already adhered to by both France and Spain) and that Andorra accept entry only of those who have right of entry of Spain or France. Andorra is allowed to permit long stays for any person. Travellers requiring a Schengen visa to enter the Schengen Area may enter Andorra using this visa, but it must be a multiple-entry visa, as entering Andorra entails leaving the Schengen Area.

== French communes and Andorran parishes along the border ==
From west to east:

French side – 9 towns:

7 in Ariège: Auzat, Lercoul, Siguer, Gestiès, Aston, Mérens-les-Vals and L'Hospitalet-près-l'Andorre; 2 in Pyrénées-Orientales: Porté-Puymorens and Porta.

Andorran side – 4 parishes:

La Massana, Ordino, Canillo and Encamp.

== See also ==
- Andorra–Spain border
- France–Spain border
