= Soul Mates (2023 French film) =

- Theatrical release poster
- Directed by: André Téchiné
- Written by: André Téchiné; Cédric Anger
- Produced by: Olivier Delbosc
- Starring: Benjamin Voisin; Noémie Merlant
- Cinematography: George Lechaptois
- Edited by: Albertine Lastera
- Music by: Mathieu Lamboley
- Production companies: Curiosa Films; Arte France Cinéma; Legato Films; HBB 26; Ad Vitam
- Distributed by: Ad Vitam
- Release date: 12 April 2023 (France)
- Running time: 100 minutes
- Country: France
- Language: French
- Box office: $480,762

Soul Mates (French: Les Âmes sœurs) is 2023 French drama film directed by André Téchiné from a screenplay he co-wrote with Cédric Anger. Starring Benjamin Voisin and Noémie Merlant, it is about a soldier who returns home after the war in Mali and has PTSD.

== Plot ==
A soldier of the French forces engaged in Mali is seriously burned during an explosion. Repatriated to intensive care in France, he has amnesia and begins a long convalescence with his sister in their family home in the Pyrenees.

== Cast ==
- Benjamin Voisin as David Faber
- Noémie Merlant as Jeanne
- Audrey Dana as Rachel
- André Marcon as Marcel
- Alexis Loret as Dr. Fanch-Tanguy
- Sya Rachedi as Nadja
- Mama Prassinos as The Military Wife
- Jean Fornerod as Bruno Vogel
- Stéphane Bak as Franck Dawaga

== Production ==
Filming began in June 2021 in the Ariège department, including Orgeix, Ax-les-Thermes and Orlu. Filming also took place in the Aude department and in Paris. It was also partly shot in Pyrénées-Orientales. Filming resumed at the start of 2022 for scenes at the Bédeilhac Cave in Bédeilhac-et-Aynat and at the Prehistoric Park in Tarascon-sur-Ariège.

== Critical response ==
On AlloCiné, the film received an average rating of 3.6 out of 5, based on 27 reviews from French critics.
