= Arnave =

Commune in Occitanie, France

- Commune
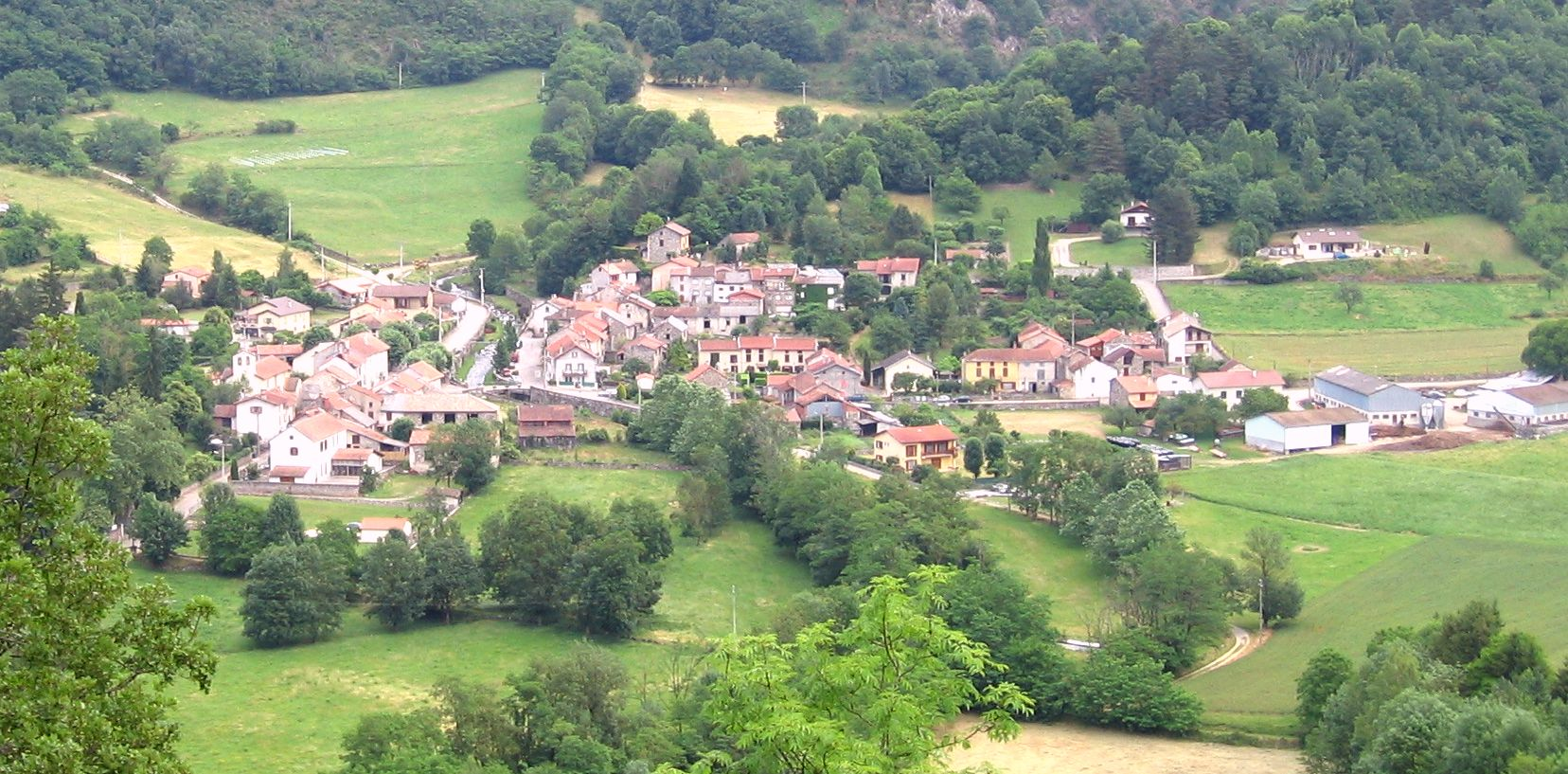
- A general view of Arnave
- Location of Arnave
- Location within France Location within Occitanie
- Coordinates: 42°51′15″N 1°38′54″E
- Country: France
- Region: Occitania
- Department: Ariège
- Arrondissement: Foix
- Canton: Sabarthès
- Intercommunality: CC Pays Tarascon

Government
  - Mayor (2020–2026): Bernard Farandou
- Area^{1}: 8.38 km^{2} (3.24 sq mi)
- Elevation: 650 m (2,130 ft)
- Highest elevation: 1,303 m (4,275 ft)
- Lowest elevation: 514 m (1,686 ft)
- Population (2023): 208
  - Density: 24.8/km^{2} (64.3/sq mi)
- Time zone: UTC+01:00 (CET)
  - Summer (DST): UTC+02:00 (CEST)
- INSEE/Postal code: 09016 /09400
- ^{1} French Land Register data, which excludes lakes, ponds, glaciers > 1 km^{2} (0.386 sq mi or 247 acres) and river estuaries.

Arnave (French pronunciation: [aʁnav]; Occitan: Arnava) is a commune in the Ariège department of southwestern France.

== Geography ==
Arnave is situated in the Pyrenees and is served by Highway D20. The town sits in a deep valley between mountain peaks, the tallest of which is 1,300 metres (4,300 ft) above sea level.

Arnave was built on the banks of a stream by the same name. The source of this stream is at an approximate altitude of 1,700 metres (5,600 ft), at the foot of Mount Fourcat 2,001 metres (6,565 ft). It is fed by two other streams, the Ruisseau de la Sécaille and, further downstream, the Ruisseau de la Montagne. The former descends by way of Cazenave-Serres-et-Allens and its source is at 1,818 metres (5,965 ft) the base of le Pic du Han (2,074 metres (6,804 ft)). The source of the latter is further to the north and on the other side of the Cazenave mountain, at the Lauzate peak. The Arnave stream is also fed by other smaller streams and springs. The Arnave stream itself empties into the river Ariège four kilometres downstream from the town of Arnave, at the site of Bompas, Ariège.

The Arnave stream winds through high valleys with many waterfalls, some of which are impressive. One in particular is known as "la poêle" (the "stovetop" or "frying pan") for its being difficult to access.

== Population ==
Historical population
Year	Pop.	±% p.a.
1968	146	—
1975	109	−4.09%
1982	123	+1.74%
1990	153	+2.77%
1999	168	+1.04%
2007	206	+2.58%
2012	213	+0.67%
2017	207	−0.57%
2023	208	+0.08%
Source: INSEE

Inhabitants of Arnave are called Arnavais in French.

== Sites and monuments ==
The Chapel Saint-Paul d'Arnave is an example of Romanesque Architecture and is considered one of the oldest in the department. The building dates to the 10th and 11th centuries. Jules d'Ancelin, the baron of Labaume, is interred here. The chapel was part of the Labaume Barony until the mid-20th century, when it was ceded to the town for restoration. The site is also known for its black stone, believed to cure "Haut-Mal", or epilepsy, when the afflicted sleeps an entire night with his head beneath it. The site was a longtime pilgrimage destination thanks to legends of miraculous cures.

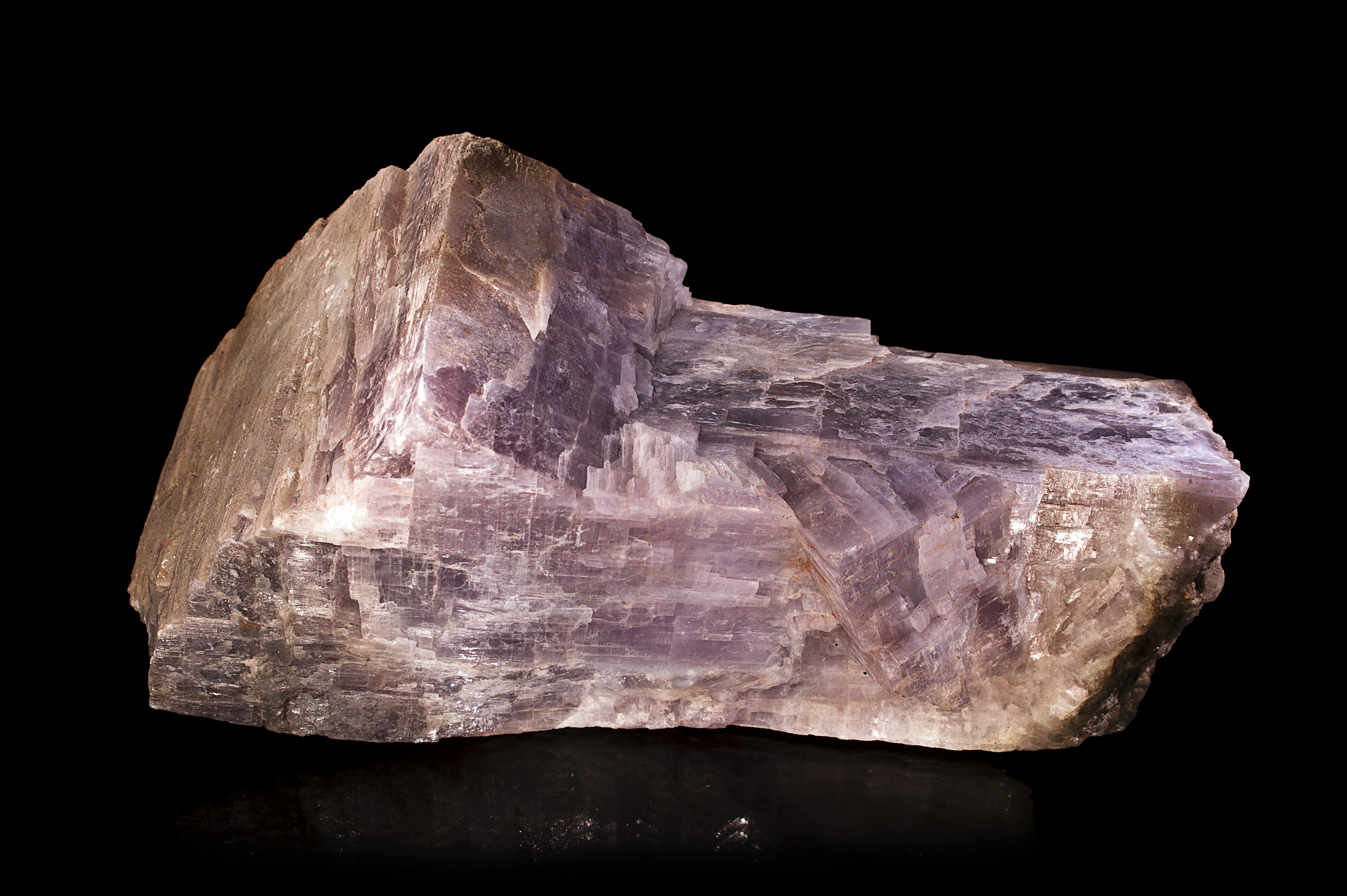
Anhydrite from the former gypsum quarry at Arnave

A gypsum quarry from the last century is known for anhydrite specimens.
