= Pic Negre d'Envalira =

Mountain located on the border of France and Andorra

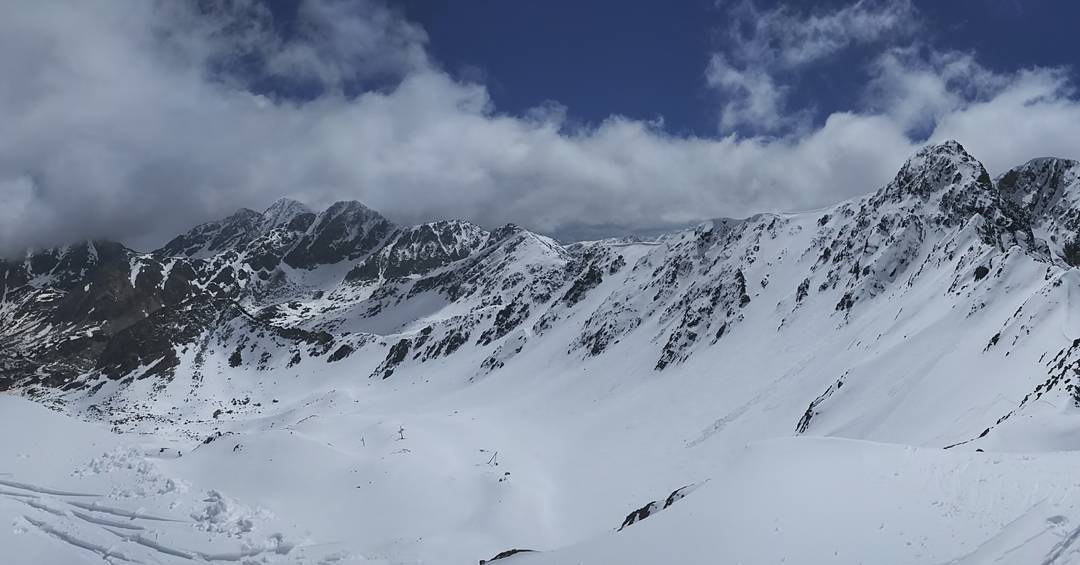

Highest point
- Elevation: 2,823 m (9,262 ft)
- Coordinates: 42°31′2″N 1°43′17″E

Geography
- Location: Encamp, Andorra; Porta, Pyrénées-Orientales, France
- Parent range: Pyrenees

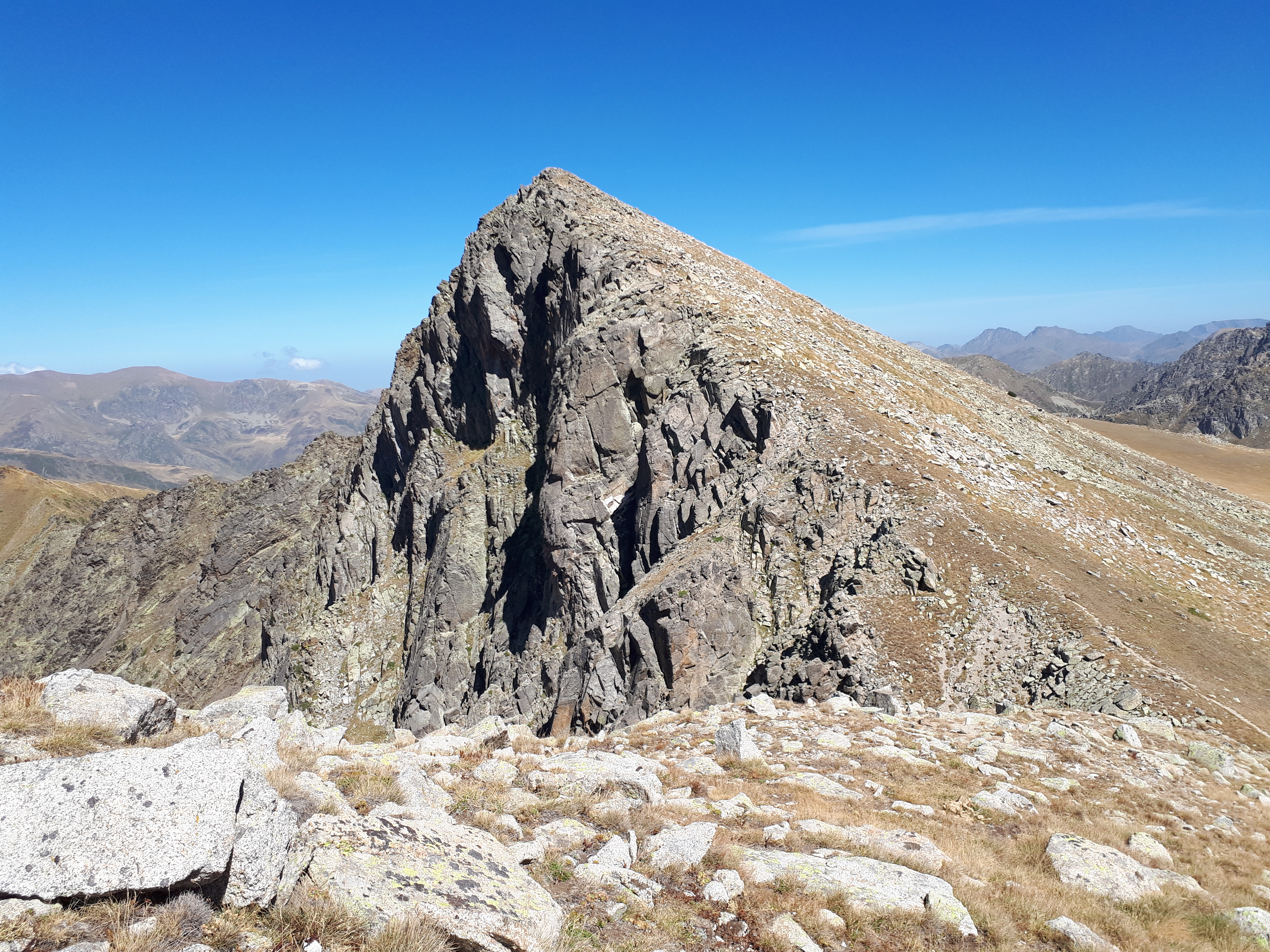
View looking north to the summit of Pic Negra d'Envalira. Granite boulders in the foreground. Metasediments of Cambrian-Ordovician age in the cliffs to the left of the summit.

Pic Negre d'Envalira is a mountain of the eastern Pyrenees. Administratively, it is located on the border between Andorra (parish of Encamp), and France (municipality of Porta, department of Pyrénées-Orientales).

Pic Negre d'Envalira is bordered by the Pics Orientaux de Font Nègre (2878 m) to the east, Pic de Peyrefourque (2647 m) and Puigpedrós (2914 m) to the southeast and the Pic de Camp Colomer (2869 m) to the south. Between Pic Nègre d'Envalira and Pic de Camp Colomer, there is the Portella Blanca pass (2517 m above sea level). On the eastern slopes of the peak, the Ribera de Campcardós stream has its source, while to the south of it, the Riu d'Engaït stream begins its course.

The mountain is situated close to the northern edge of the Mont-Louis - Andorra Hercynian granite pluton. A zone of Cambrian and Ordovician metasediments (quartzites, conglomerates, schists, etc) extends to the north.

Pic Negre d'Envalira should not be confused with the Pic Negre d'Urgell mountain, located at the tripoint of two Andorran parishes, Escaldes-Engordany and Sant Julià de Lòria and the Spanish province of Lleida.
