= Bompas =

Bompas is the name of the following communes in France:

- Bompas, Ariège, in the Ariège department
- Bompas, Pyrénées-Orientales, in the Pyrénées-Orientales department
