= Pic Negre d'Urgell =

Highest point
- Elevation: 2,644 m (8,675 ft)
- Coordinates: 42°27′32″N 1°33′40″E

Geography
- Location: Escaldes–Engordany and Sant Julià de Lòria, Andorra; Province of Lleida, Catalonia, Spain
- Parent range: Pyrenees

Pic Negre d'Urgell is a mountain of the eastern Pyrenees. Administratively, it is located at the tripoint of two Andorran parishes, Escaldes–Engordany and Sant Julià de Lòria and the Spanish province of Lleida.

Pic Negre d'Urgell is bordered by the Pic de Monturull (2754 m) to the west, Torre dels Soldats (2761 m) to the southeast, Obaga de Nou Fonts (2606 m) to the northwest, and Port Negre d'Urgell (2665 m) to the west. The stream Torrent de Port Negre has its source on the southern slopes of Pic Negre d'Urgell.

Pic Negre d'Urgell should not be confused with the Pic Negre d'Envalira mountain, located about 20 km to the northeast, on the border between Andorra (parish of Encamp) and France (municipality of Porta, department of Hautes-Pyrénées).

== See also ==
- List of mountains in Catalonia
