= Étangs de Neych =

Group of ponds in France

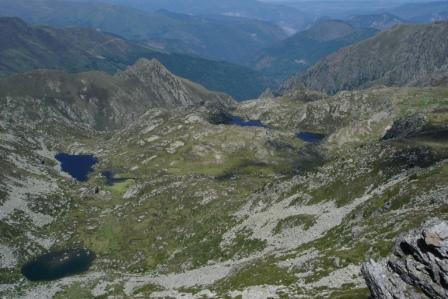

- Location within France
- Location: Siguer, Ariège
- Coordinates: 42°42′10″N 01°32′50″E
- Basin countries: France
- Surface elevation: 2,000 m (6,600 ft)

Étangs de Neych are a group of ponds at Siguer in the Ariège department, France.
