= Rabat-les-Trois-Seigneurs =

Commune in Occitanie, France

Rabat-les-Trois-Seigneurs Ravat (Occitan)
- Commune
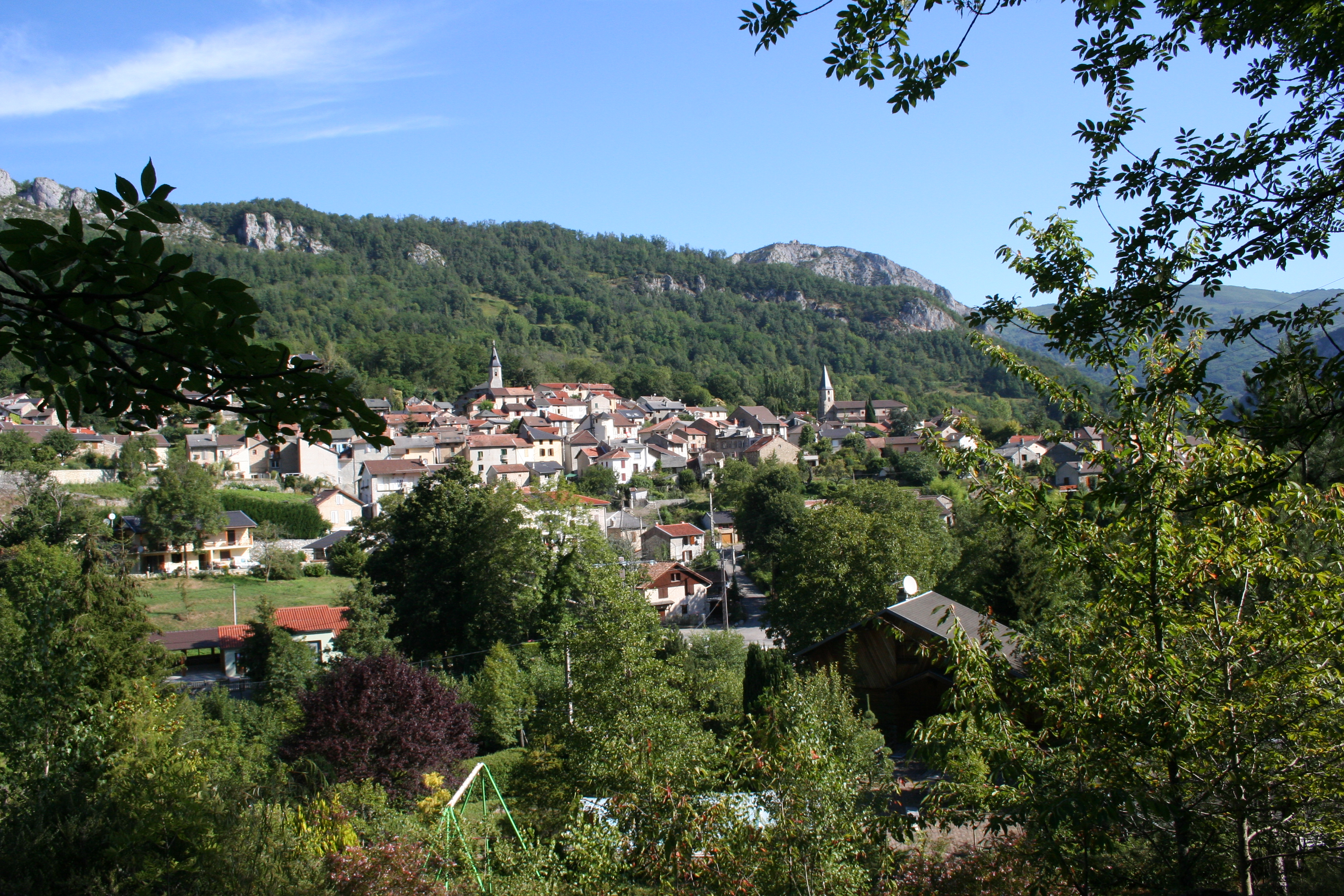
- A general view of Rabat-les-Trois-Seigneurs
- Location of Rabat-les-Trois-Seigneurs
- Location within France Location within Occitanie
- Coordinates: 42°51′24″N 1°33′13″E
- Country: France
- Region: Occitania
- Department: Ariège
- Arrondissement: Foix
- Canton: Sabarthès
- Intercommunality: Pays de Tarascon

Government
  - Mayor (2020–2026): Yolande Denjean
- Area^{1}: 26.96 km^{2} (10.41 sq mi)
- Elevation: 625 m (2,051 ft)
- Highest elevation: 2,196 m (7,205 ft)
- Lowest elevation: 548 m (1,798 ft)
- Population (2023): 379
  - Density: 14.1/km^{2} (36.4/sq mi)
- Time zone: UTC+01:00 (CET)
  - Summer (DST): UTC+02:00 (CEST)
- INSEE/Postal code: 09241 /09400
- ^{1} French Land Register data, which excludes lakes, ponds, glaciers > 1 km^{2} (0.386 sq mi or 247 acres) and river estuaries.

Rabat-les-Trois-Seigneurs (French pronunciation: [ʁaba le tʁwɑ sɛɲœʁ]; Occitan: Ravat los Tres Senhors) is a commune in the Ariège department in the Occitanie region in southwestern France.

== Name ==
The real name of the village is Rabat, but since 1931 the French post office administration has decided that the name has to be labelled as Rabat-les-Trois-Seigneurs to avoid a confusion with the city of Rabat in Morocco. Note that the village was called Rabat since Charlemagne in the 8th century, four centuries before Rabat in Morocco that was founded only in 1150.

The expression "les trois seigneurs" means in French "of the three lords". It is a reference to a mountain called "Le pic des trois seigneurs" that close the Courbière valley in which Rabat is settled. The name come from the fact that three valleys (Courbière, Vicdessos, Couserans) are closed by this peak. As each of the valleys has a different lord, the peak is a place common to three lords and so is called "Peak of the three lords". A legend said that every year in summer, the three lords met on the flat stone at the top of the peak and discussed together.

The inhabitants of Rabat are called Rabatols in Occitan (the historical local language) or Rabatois.

== Population ==
Historical population
Year	Pop.	±% p.a.
1968	260	—
1975	287	+1.42%
1982	311	+1.15%
1990	298	−0.53%
1999	264	−1.34%
2007	293	+1.31%
2012	330	+2.41%
2017	356	+1.53%
2023	379	+1.05%
Source: INSEE

== Geography ==
The village of Rabat is settled in the valley of the Courbière, a mountain river. Most of the 15 km of the river are on the village territory.

== History ==
Man has settled in the valley of the Courbière since more than 17,000 years. Many archaeological artifacts from the Magdalenian period have been found in the valley (cavern of Bédheilac).

== Sights ==
Rabat church's older portion was built in the 10th century and has a famous wooden altarpiece.

== Personalities ==
- Corbeyran de Rabat (1321-1402), Hofmeister of Gaston Fébus
- Catherine de Rabat, mistress of Gaston Fébus who had four children with him.

== Gallery ==
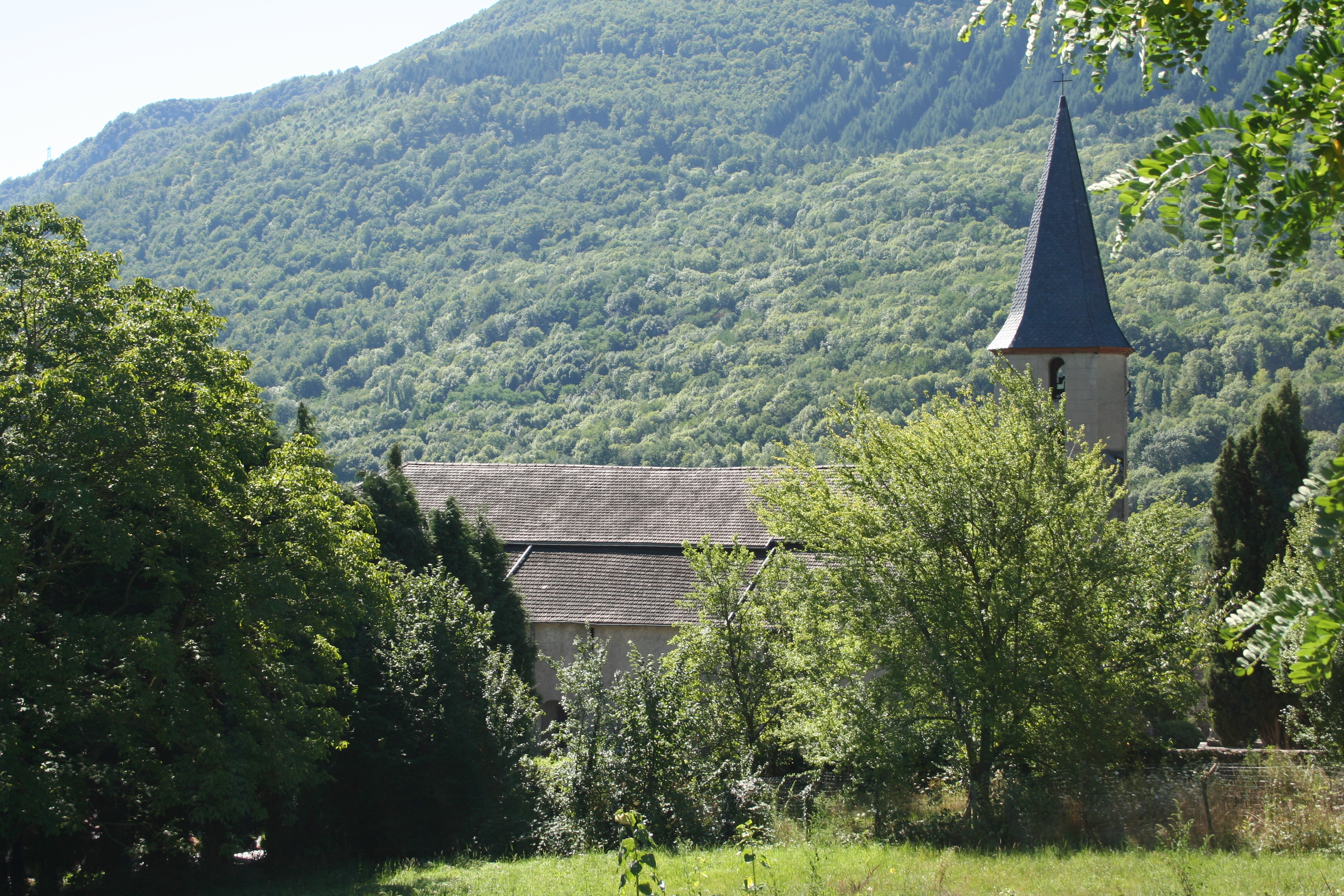
Church of Rabat as seen from the road to Bédeilhac

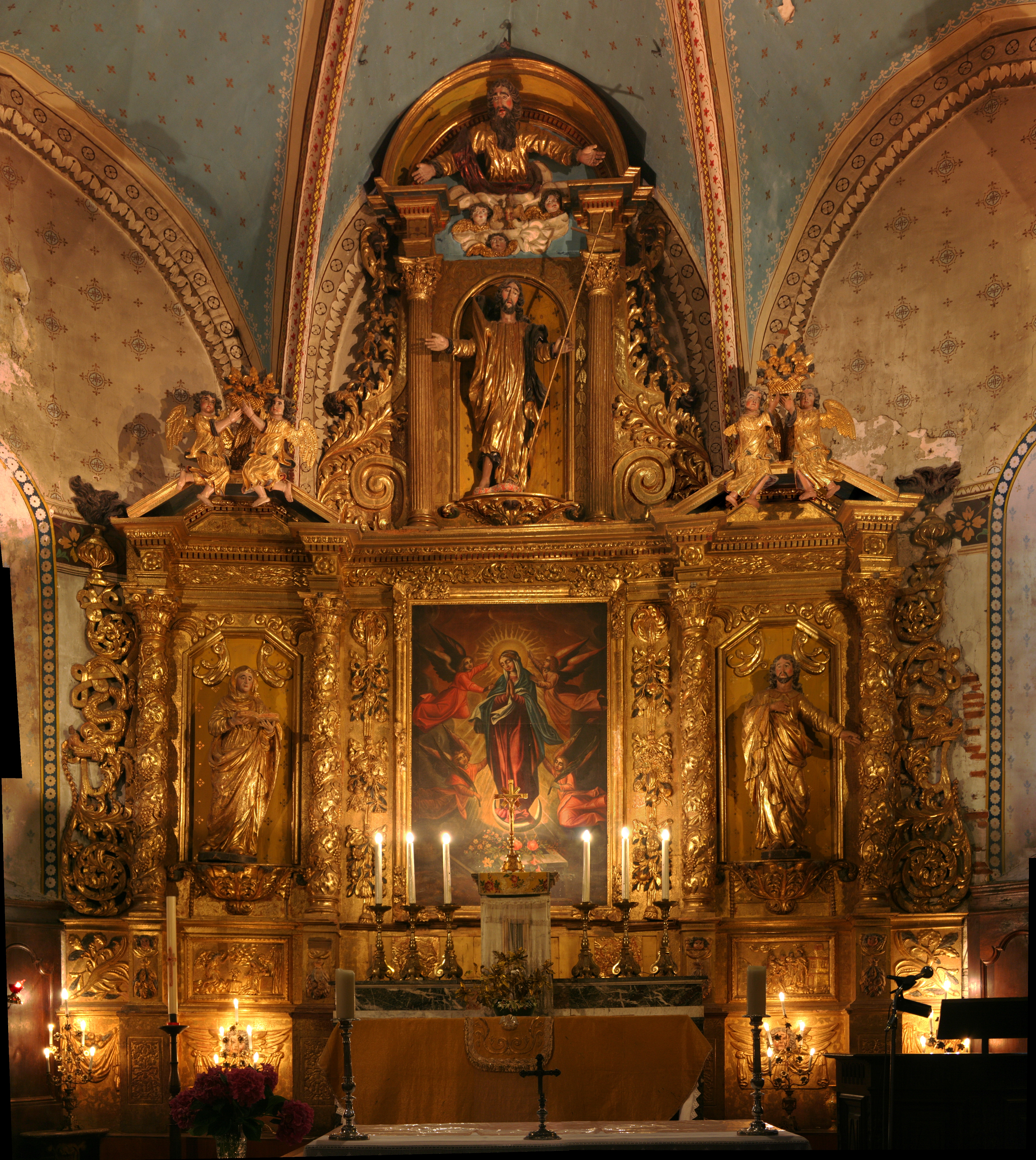
Church of Rabat altarpiece

== See also ==
- Communes of the Ariège department
