= Celles, Ariège =

Commune in Occitanie, France

Celles
- Commune
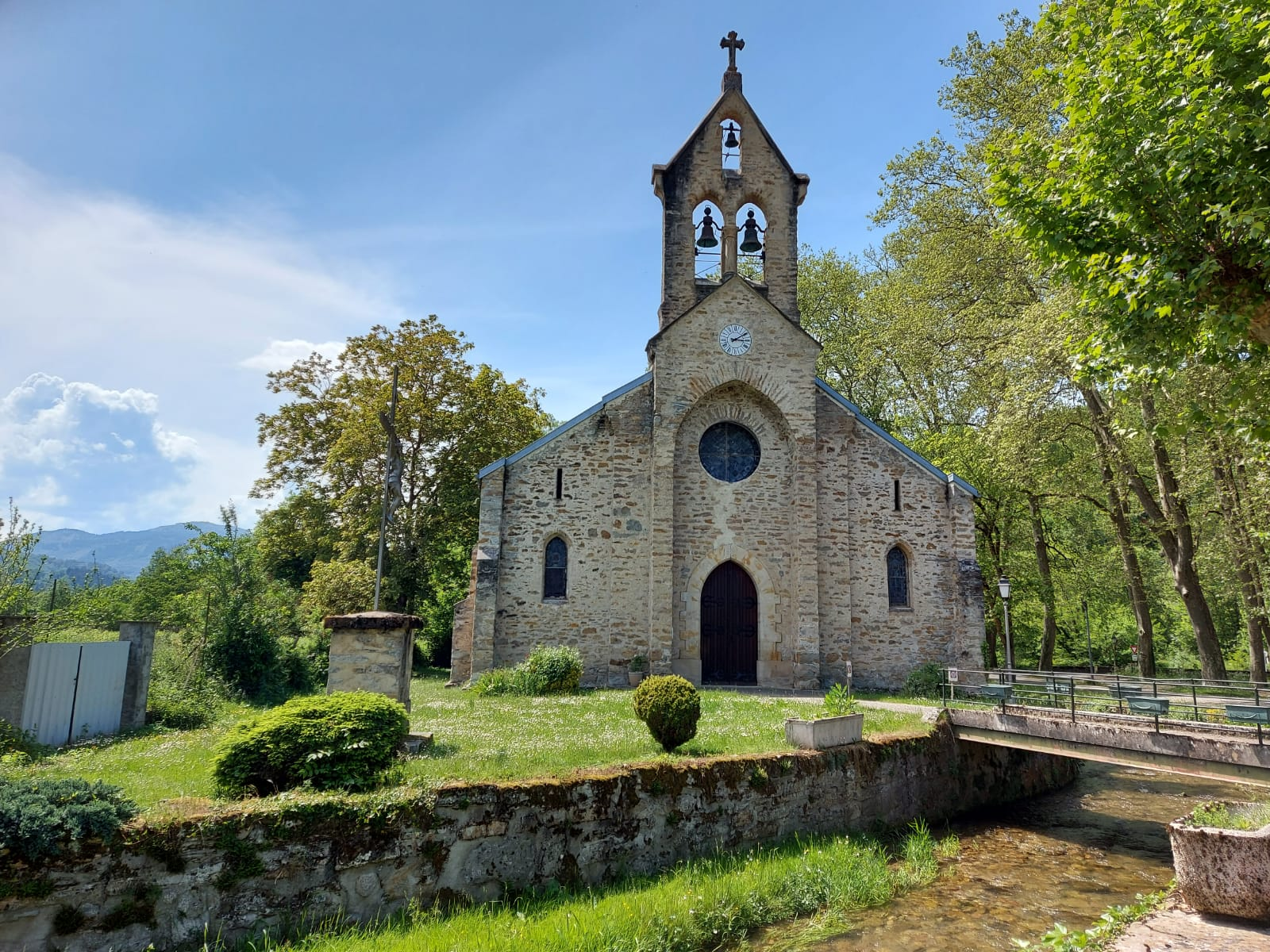
- Église Saint Michel
- Location of Celles
- Location within France Location within Occitanie
- Coordinates: 42°55′04″N 1°41′15″E
- Country: France
- Region: Occitania
- Department: Ariège
- Arrondissement: Foix
- Canton: Sabarthès
- Intercommunality: CA Pays Foix-Varilhes

Government
  - Mayor (2020–2026): René-Bernard Authié
- Area^{1}: 10.27 km^{2} (3.97 sq mi)
- Elevation: 425 m (1,394 ft)
- Highest elevation: 1,093 m (3,586 ft)
- Lowest elevation: 470 m (1,540 ft)
- Population (2023): 143
  - Density: 13.9/km^{2} (36.1/sq mi)
- Time zone: UTC+01:00 (CET)
  - Summer (DST): UTC+02:00 (CEST)
- INSEE/Postal code: 09093 /09000
- ^{1} French Land Register data, which excludes lakes, ponds, glaciers > 1 km^{2} (0.386 sq mi or 247 acres) and river estuaries.

Celles (French pronunciation: [sɛl]; Occitan: Cèlas) is a commune in the Ariège department in southwestern France.

== Population ==
Historical population
Year	Pop.	±% p.a.
1968	138	—
1975	122	−1.75%
1982	135	+1.46%
1990	127	−0.76%
1999	134	+0.60%
2007	115	−1.89%
2012	119	+0.69%
2017	148	+4.46%
2023	143	−0.57%
Source: INSEE

== See also ==
- Communes of the Ariège department
