= Prayols =

Commune in Occitanie, France

- Commune
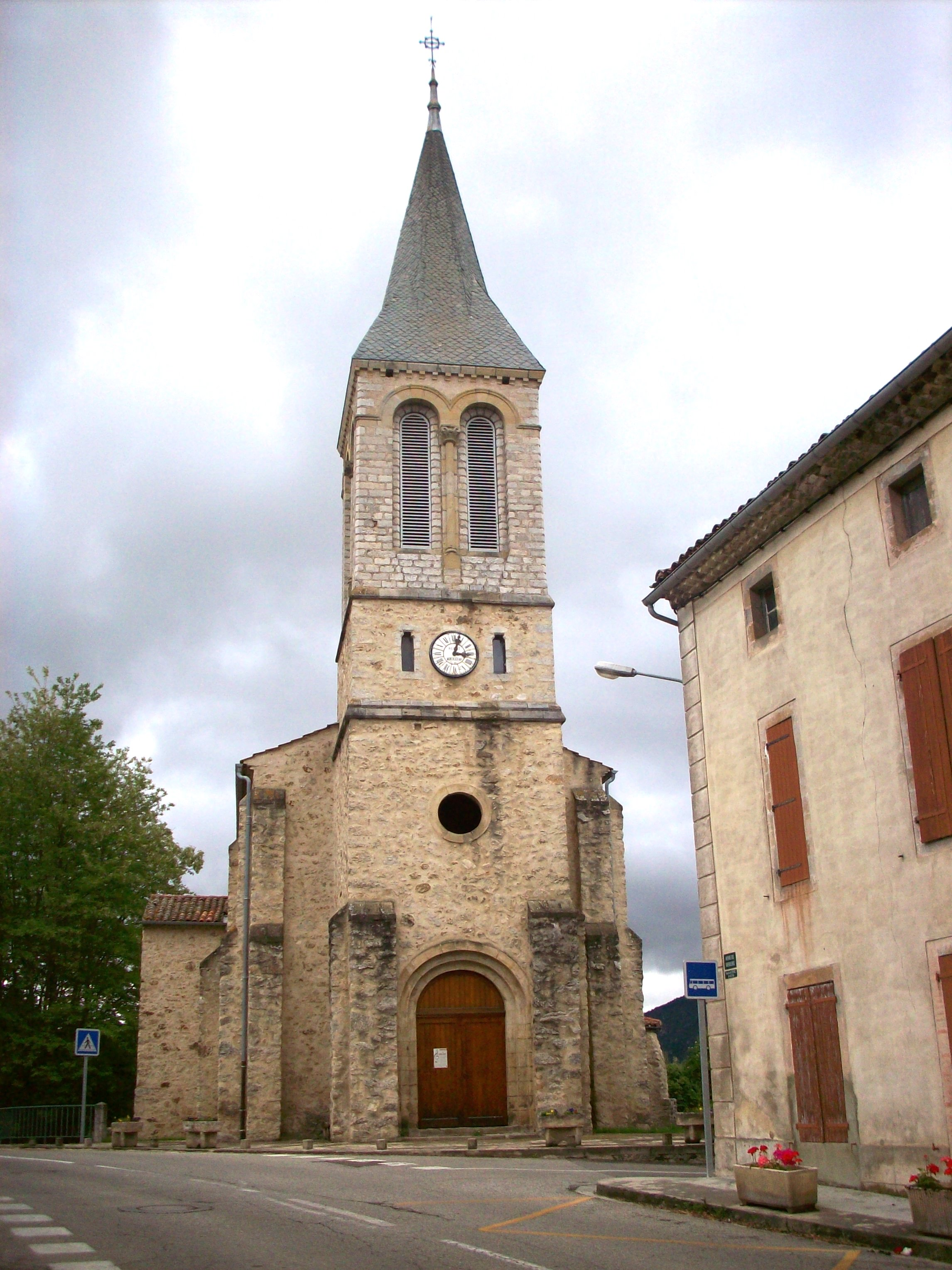
- The church in Prayols
- Location of Prayols
- Location within France Location within Occitanie
- Coordinates: 42°55′42″N 1°37′28″E
- Country: France
- Region: Occitania
- Department: Ariège
- Arrondissement: Foix
- Canton: Sabarthès
- Intercommunality: CA Pays Foix-Varilhes

Government
  - Mayor (2020–2026): Francis Laguerre
- Area^{1}: 7.76 km^{2} (3.00 sq mi)
- Elevation: 435 m (1,427 ft)
- Highest elevation: 1,403 m (4,603 ft)
- Lowest elevation: 399 m (1,309 ft)
- Population (2023): 364
  - Density: 46.9/km^{2} (121/sq mi)
- Time zone: UTC+01:00 (CET)
  - Summer (DST): UTC+02:00 (CEST)
- INSEE/Postal code: 09236 /09000
- ^{1} French Land Register data, which excludes lakes, ponds, glaciers > 1 km^{2} (0.386 sq mi or 247 acres) and river estuaries.

Prayols (French pronunciation: [pʁajɔl]; Occitan: Praiòls) is a commune in the Ariège department in southwestern France.

== Population ==
Inhabitants of Prayols are called Prayolais in French.

Historical population
Year	Pop.	±% p.a.
1968	150	—
1975	159	+0.84%
1982	186	+2.27%
1990	205	+1.22%
1999	305	+4.51%
2007	353	+1.84%
2012	376	+1.27%
2017	371	−0.27%
2023	364	−0.32%
Source: INSEE

== See also ==
- Communes of the Ariège department
