= Orus, Ariège =

Commune in Occitanie, France

Orus
- Commune
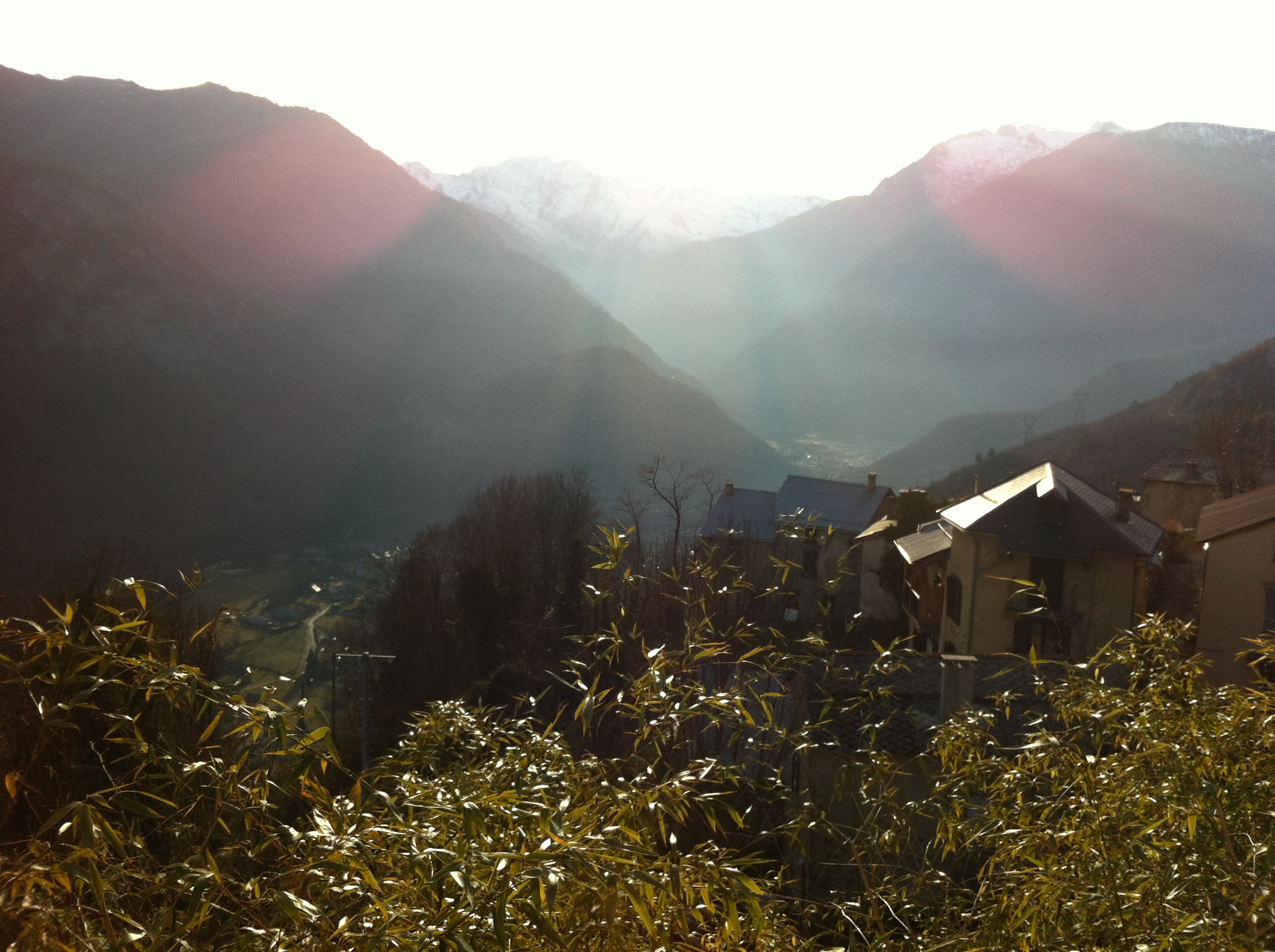
- A view of the Pyrenees from Orus.
- Location of Orus
- Location within France Location within Occitanie
- Coordinates: 42°46′59″N 1°30′29″E
- Country: France
- Region: Occitania
- Department: Ariège
- Arrondissement: Foix
- Canton: Sabarthès

Government
  - Mayor (2020–2026): Éric Delpy
- Area^{1}: 9.12 km^{2} (3.52 sq mi)
- Elevation: 981 m (3,219 ft)
- Highest elevation: 1,980 m (6,500 ft)
- Lowest elevation: 819 m (2,687 ft)
- Population (2023): 23
  - Density: 2.5/km^{2} (6.5/sq mi)
- Time zone: UTC+01:00 (CET)
  - Summer (DST): UTC+02:00 (CEST)
- INSEE/Postal code: 09222 /09220
- ^{1} French Land Register data, which excludes lakes, ponds, glaciers > 1 km^{2} (0.386 sq mi or 247 acres) and river estuaries.

Orus is a commune in the Ariège department in southwestern France.

== Population ==
Inhabitants of Orus are called Orusiens in French.

Historical population
Year	Pop.	±% p.a.
1968	15	—
1975	11	−4.33%
1982	13	+2.42%
1990	20	+5.53%
1999	18	−1.16%
2007	20	+1.33%
2012	30	+8.45%
2017	25	−3.58%
2023	23	−1.38%
Source: INSEE

== See also ==
- Communes of the Ariège department
