= Lapège =

Commune in Occitanie, France

- Commune
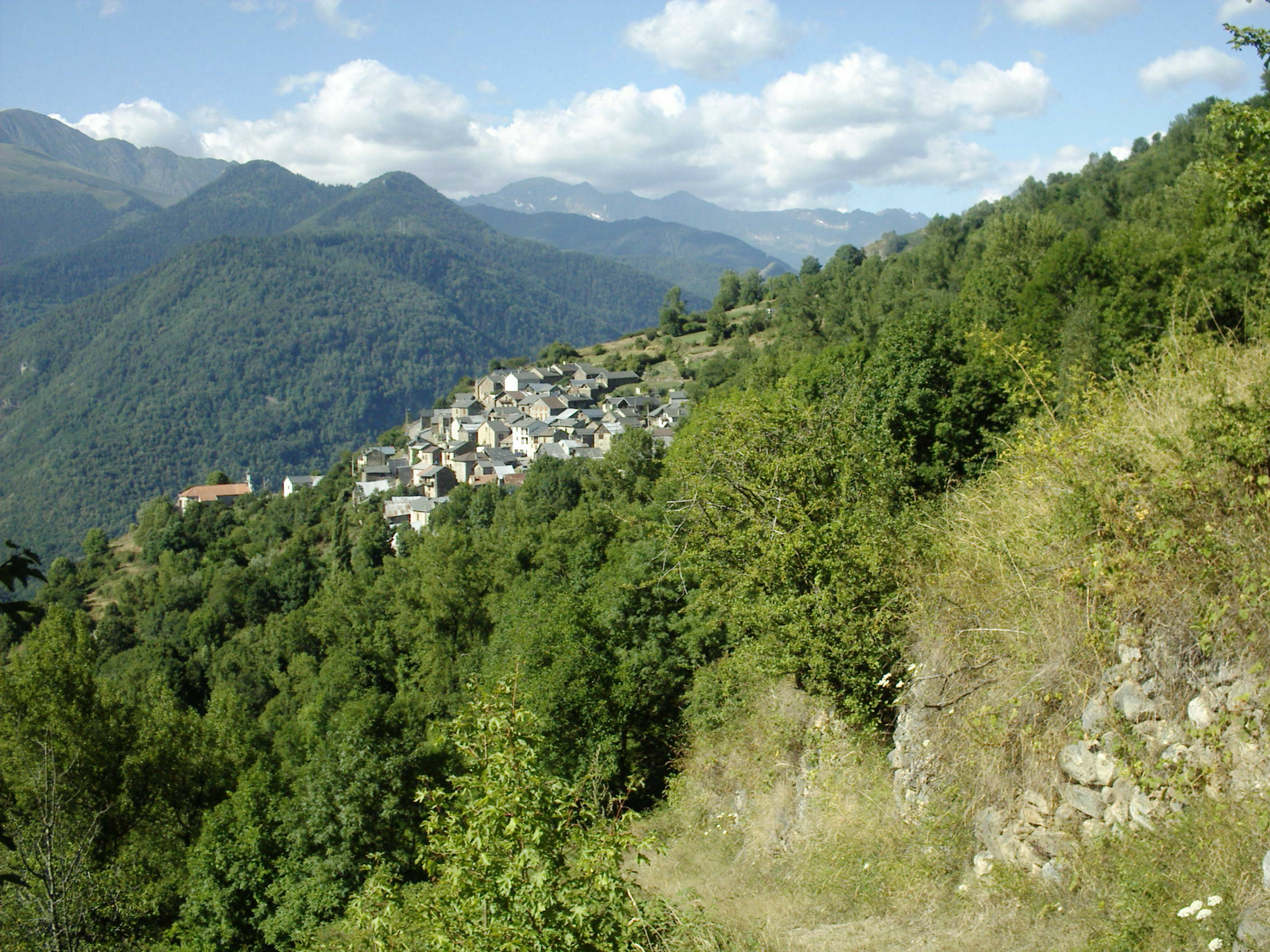
- A general view of Lapège
- Location of Lapège
- Location within France Location within Occitanie
- Coordinates: 42°48′06″N 1°34′23″E
- Country: France
- Region: Occitania
- Department: Ariège
- Arrondissement: Foix
- Canton: Sabarthès
- Intercommunality: Pays de Tarascon

Government
  - Mayor (2020–2026): Jean-Claude Claustres
- Area^{1}: 8.29 km^{2} (3.20 sq mi)
- Elevation: 991 m (3,251 ft)
- Highest elevation: 1,805 m (5,922 ft)
- Lowest elevation: 702 m (2,303 ft)
- Population (2023): 17
  - Density: 2.1/km^{2} (5.3/sq mi)
- Time zone: UTC+01:00 (CET)
  - Summer (DST): UTC+02:00 (CEST)
- INSEE/Postal code: 09152 /09400
- ^{1} French Land Register data, which excludes lakes, ponds, glaciers > 1 km^{2} (0.386 sq mi or 247 acres) and river estuaries.

Lapège (French pronunciation: [lapɛʒ]; Occitan: La Puèja) is a commune in the Ariège department in southwestern France.

== Population ==
Historical population
Year	Pop.	±% p.a.
1968	84	—
1975	92	+1.31%
1982	63	−5.27%
1990	46	−3.85%
1999	34	−3.30%
2007	29	−1.97%
2012	25	−2.92%
2017	29	+3.01%
2023	17	−8.52%
Source: INSEE

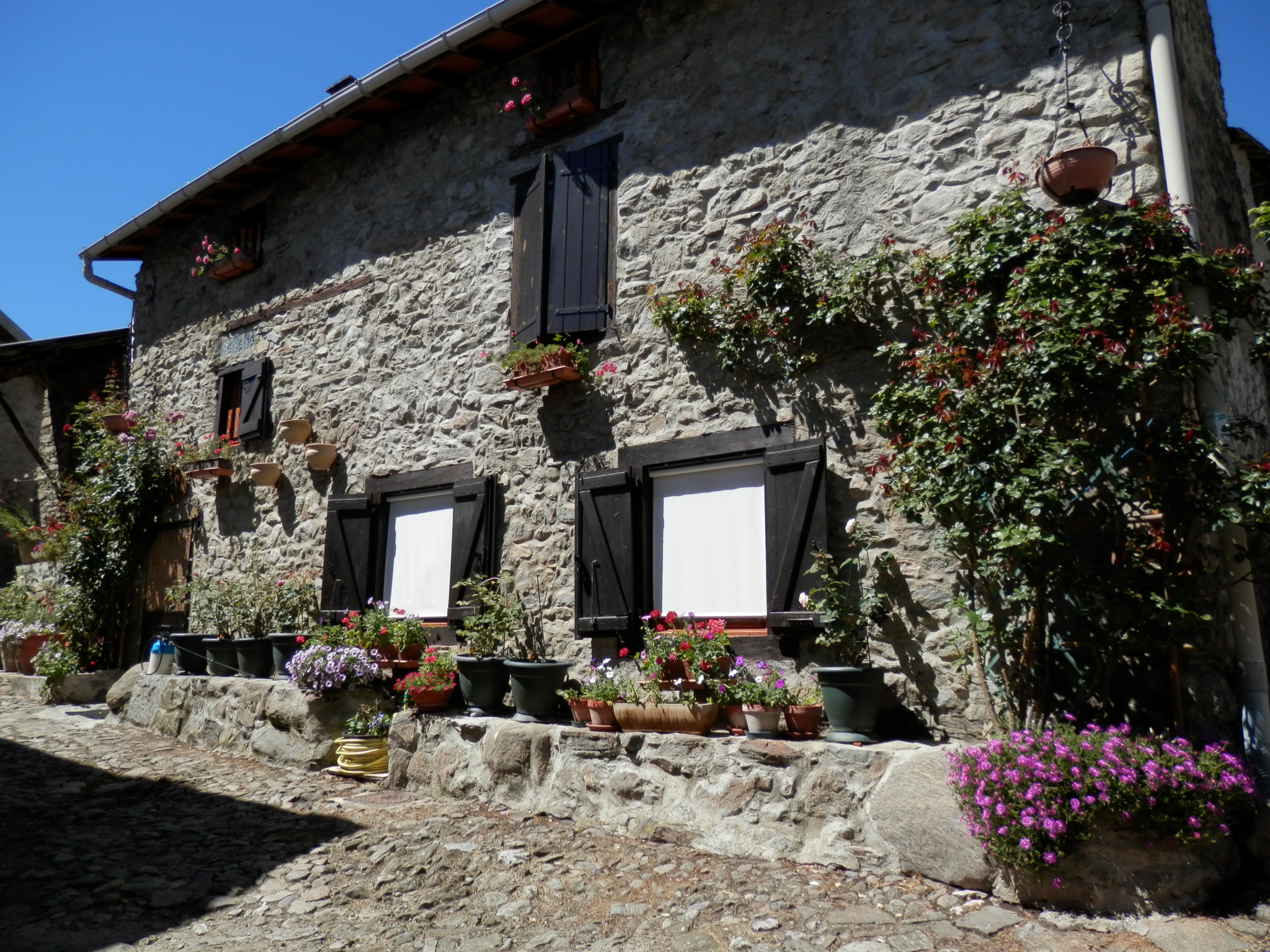

== See also ==
- Communes of the Ariège department
