= Alliat =

Commune in Occitanie, France

- Commune
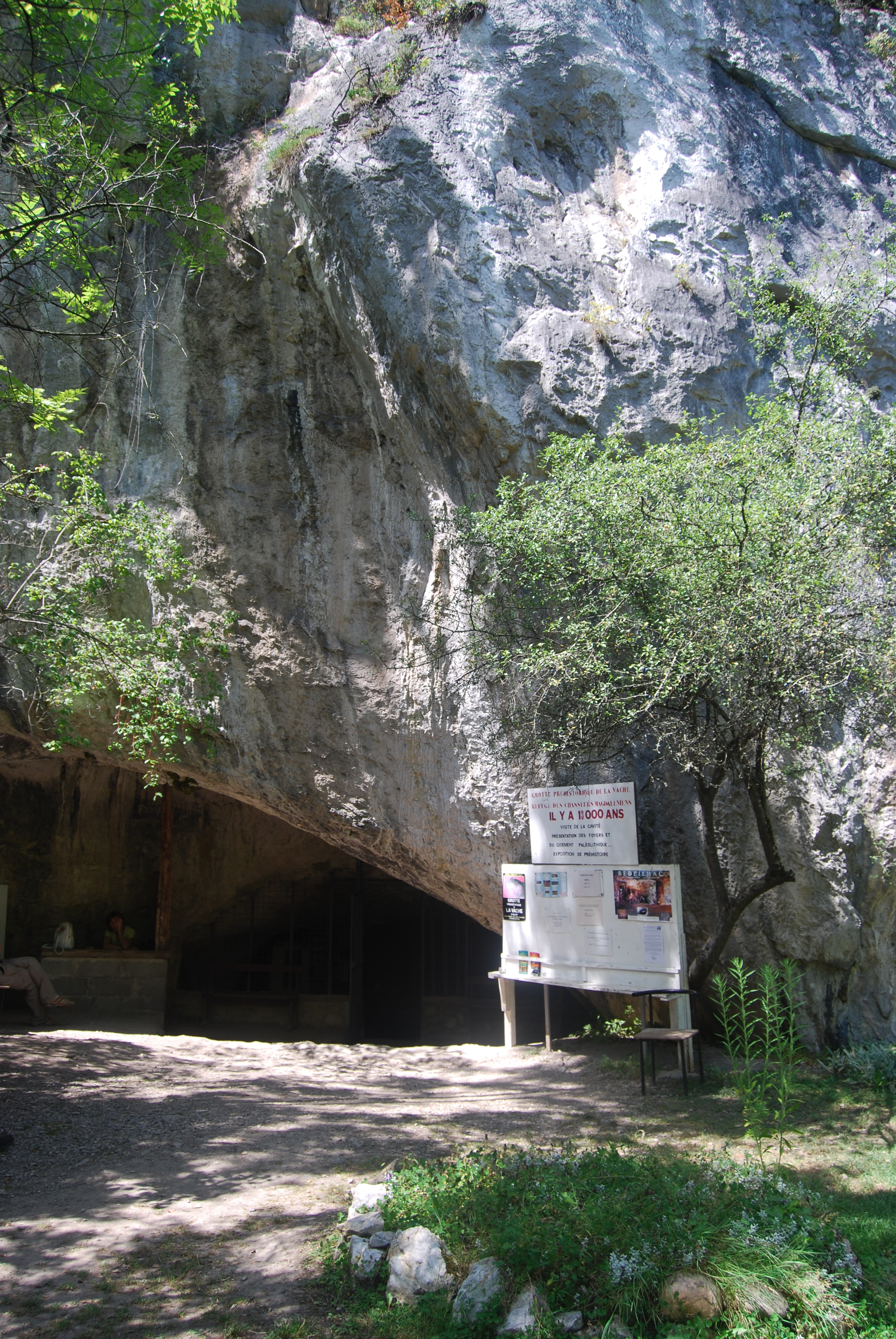
- The entrance to the La Vache Cave
- Location of Alliat
- Location within France Location within Occitanie
- Coordinates: 42°49′05″N 1°35′14″E
- Country: France
- Region: Occitania
- Department: Ariège
- Arrondissement: Foix
- Canton: Sabarthès
- Intercommunality: Pays de Tarascon

Government
  - Mayor (2020–2026): Marie-Françoise Kalandadze
- Area^{1}: 3.46 km^{2} (1.34 sq mi)
- Elevation: 560 m (1,840 ft)
- Highest elevation: 1,268 m (4,160 ft)
- Lowest elevation: 500 m (1,600 ft)
- Population (2023): 57
  - Density: 16/km^{2} (43/sq mi)
- Time zone: UTC+01:00 (CET)
  - Summer (DST): UTC+02:00 (CEST)
- INSEE/Postal code: 09006 /09400
- ^{1} French Land Register data, which excludes lakes, ponds, glaciers > 1 km^{2} (0.386 sq mi or 247 acres) and river estuaries.

Alliat (French pronunciation: [alja]; Occitan: Aliat) is a commune in the Ariège department and Occitanie region in southwestern France.

== Geography ==
Commune in the "Haute-Ariège" part of the Pyrenees located 15 km from the city of Foix and 5 km from the city of Tarascon-sur-Ariège, in the "Parc naturel régional des Pyrénées ariégeoises".

== Population ==
Inhabitants of Alliat are called Alliatois in French.

Historical population
Year	Pop.	±% p.a.
1968	71	—
1975	68	−0.61%
1982	65	−0.64%
1990	55	−2.07%
1999	62	+1.34%
2007	66	+0.78%
2012	58	−2.55%
2017	51	−2.54%
2023	57	+1.87%
Source: INSEE

== Sights ==
- The "cave of the cow" (grotte de La Vache): with distinctive archeological strata discovered in its entrance and in the "salle Monique", opened to the public in 1979. It produced a remarkably rich collection of prehistorical objects from the Magdalenian era (12,000 to 14,000 years old), including a large number of harpoons and assegai points as well as more than 200 pieces of art: bones, engraved reindeer and red deer antlers, sculpture of animals, sometimes of humans, as well as rare species for that period: panther, bear, wolves, Saiga antelope, birds and salmon.

It was one of the first caves explored in Ariège (Félix Garrigou, in 1866). A second salle was discovered in 1952 and was explored by its discoverer, Romain Robert, until 1964.

- Fortified cave Spoulgas d’Alliat: located 100 m south of the cave of the cow.

== Activities ==
- Rock climbing around the caves
- Horse riding

== See also ==
- Communes of the Ariège department
