= Arignac =

Commune in Occitanie, France

- Commune
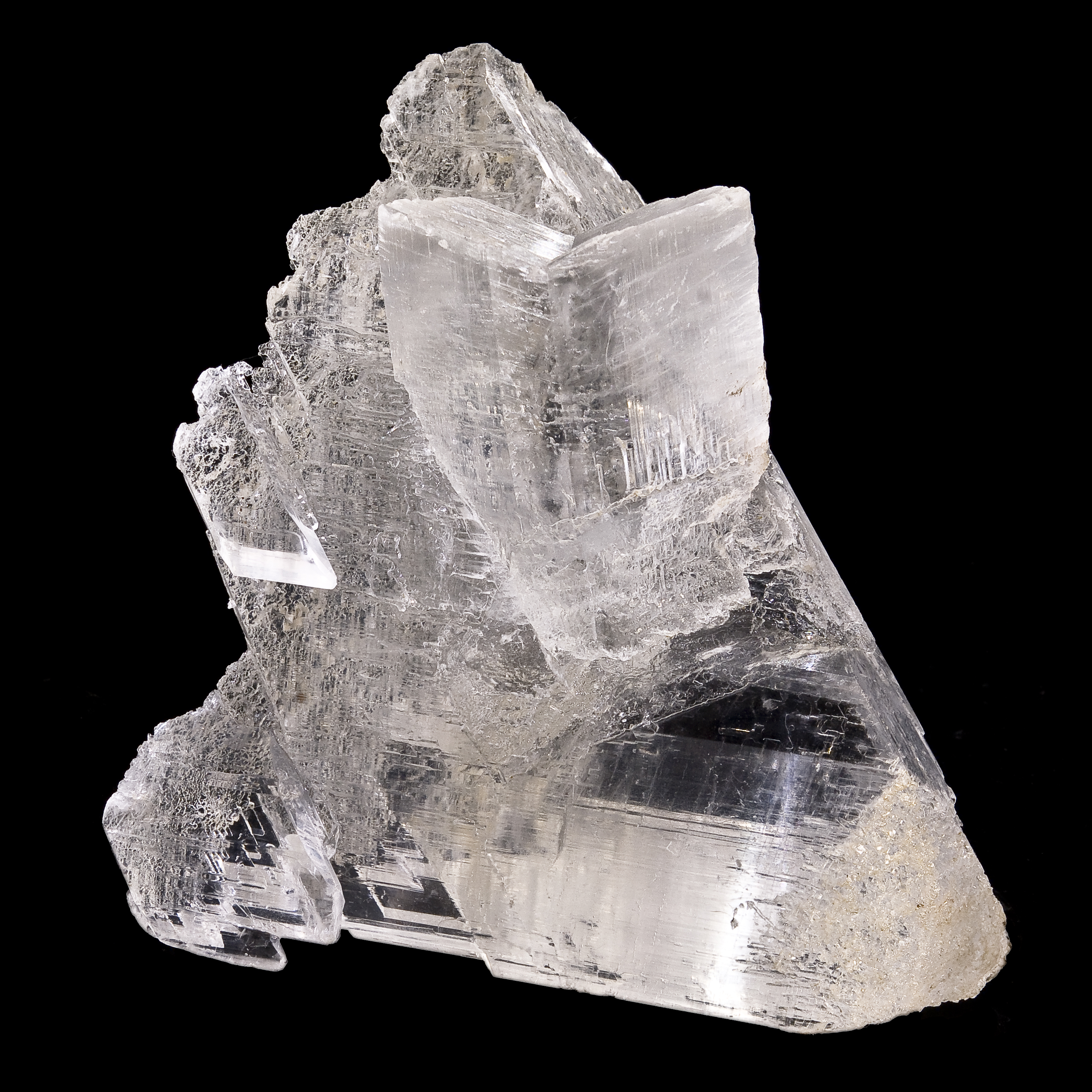
- Gypsum from Arignac
- Location of Arignac
- Location within France Location within Occitanie
- Coordinates: 42°52′19″N 1°36′05″E
- Country: France
- Region: Occitania
- Department: Ariège
- Arrondissement: Foix
- Canton: Sabarthès
- Intercommunality: CC Pays Tarascon

Government
  - Mayor (2020–2026): Philippe Pujol
- Area^{1}: 8.84 km^{2} (3.41 sq mi)
- Elevation: 470 m (1,540 ft)
- Highest elevation: 1,371 m (4,498 ft)
- Lowest elevation: 467 m (1,532 ft)
- Population (2023): 719
  - Density: 81.3/km^{2} (211/sq mi)
- Time zone: UTC+01:00 (CET)
  - Summer (DST): UTC+02:00 (CEST)
- INSEE/Postal code: 09015 /09400
- ^{1} French Land Register data, which excludes lakes, ponds, glaciers > 1 km^{2} (0.386 sq mi or 247 acres) and river estuaries.

Arignac (French pronunciation: [aʁiɲak]; Occitan: Arnhac) is a commune in the Ariège department in the Occitanie region of south-western France.

== Geography ==
Arignac is located 2 km north of Tarascon-sur-Ariège and some 11 km south of Foix. Access to the commune is by road D88 from Tarascon-sur-Ariège in the south passing through the village and continuing north-east to join National Highway N20 at Exit 14. The N20 passes through the south-east of the commune but the nearest exit is Exit 14 just east of the commune. The town covers about 10% of the commune with the rest mostly forest and hill country with a few farms in the south.

The Ariège river forms the south-eastern border of the commune and the Saurat flows south through the commune and the town to join the Ariège.

== Administration ==
List of successive mayors

From	To	Name
1900	1919	Louis Philippe
2001	2026	Philippe Pujol

== Demography ==
The inhabitants of the commune are known as Arignacois or Arignacoises in French.

Historical population

Year	Pop.	±% p.a.
1793	580	—
1800	508	−1.88%
1806	612	+3.15%
1821	596	−0.18%
1831	789	+2.84%
1836	751	−0.98%
1841	781	+0.79%
1846	813	+0.81%
1851	860	+1.13%
1856	800	−1.44%
1861	818	+0.45%
1866	803	−0.37%
1872	729	−1.60%
1876	780	+1.70%
1881	800	+0.51%
1886	820	+0.50%
1891	778	−1.05%
1896	786	+0.20%
1901	712	−1.96%

Year	Pop.	±% p.a.
1906	684	−0.80%
1911	613	−2.17%
1921	509	−1.84%
1926	549	+1.52%
1931	528	−0.78%
1936	506	−0.85%
1946	481	−0.51%
1954	494	+0.33%
1962	464	−0.78%
1968	502	+1.32%
1975	532	+0.83%
1982	683	+3.63%
1990	626	−1.08%
1999	583	−0.79%
2007	694	+2.20%
2012	723	+0.82%
2017	707	−0.45%
2023	719	+0.28%

Source: EHESS and INSEE

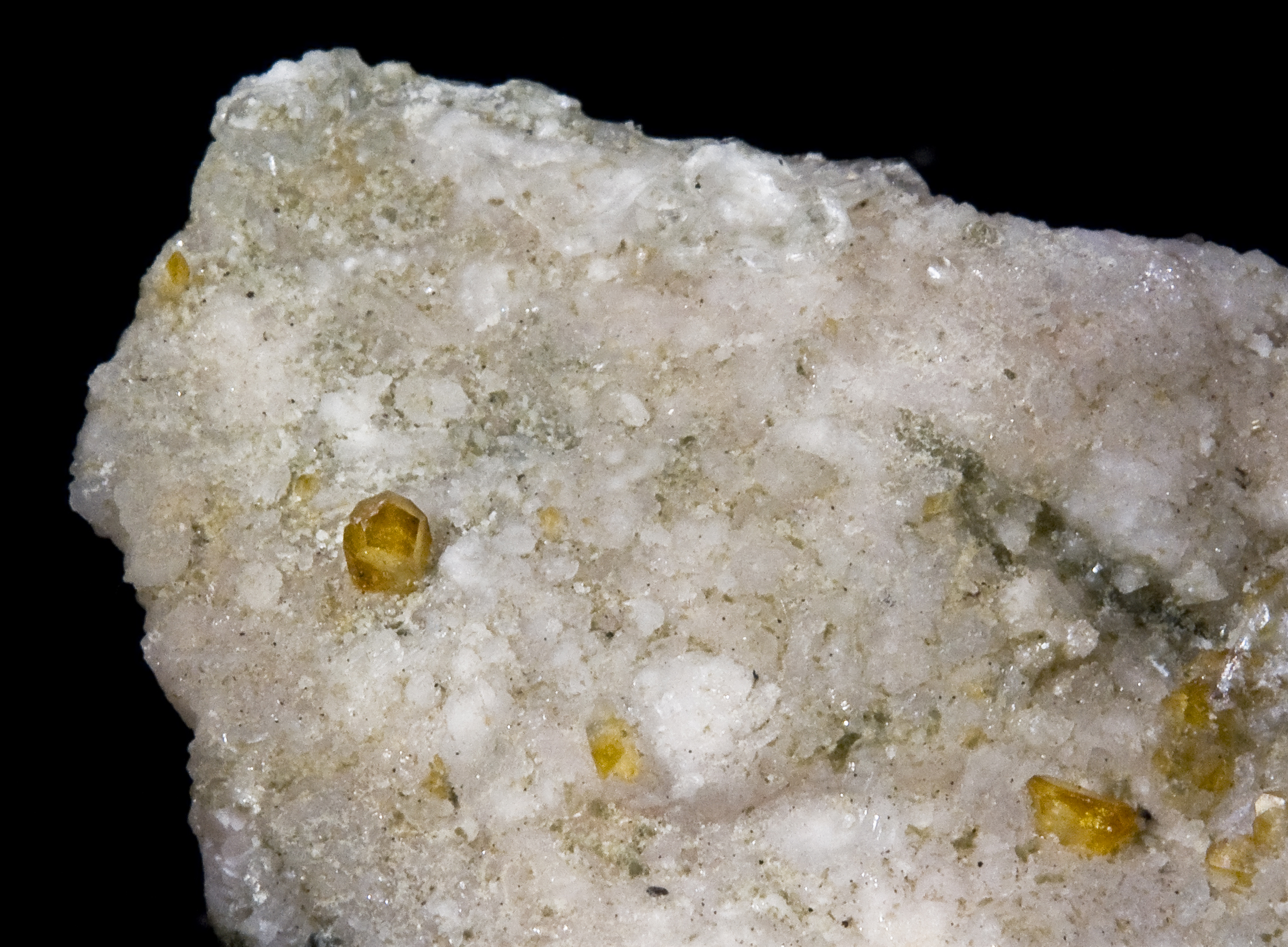
Celestine from Arignac

== See also ==
- Communes of the Ariège department
