= Génat =

Commune in Occitanie, France

- Commune
- Location of Génat
- Location within France Location within Occitanie
- Coordinates: 42°49′28″N 1°34′27″E
- Country: France
- Region: Occitania
- Department: Ariège
- Arrondissement: Foix
- Canton: Sabarthès
- Intercommunality: Pays de Tarascon

Government
  - Mayor (2020–2026): Jean-Paul Rouquier
- Area^{1}: 8.21 km^{2} (3.17 sq mi)
- Elevation: 900 m (3,000 ft)
- Highest elevation: 1,477 m (4,846 ft)
- Lowest elevation: 781 m (2,562 ft)
- Population (2023): 24
  - Density: 2.9/km^{2} (7.6/sq mi)
- Time zone: UTC+01:00 (CET)
  - Summer (DST): UTC+02:00 (CEST)
- INSEE/Postal code: 09133 /09400
- ^{1} French Land Register data, which excludes lakes, ponds, glaciers > 1 km^{2} (0.386 sq mi or 247 acres) and river estuaries.

Génat is a commune in the Ariège department in southwestern France.

== Population ==
Historical population
Year	Pop.	±% p.a.
1968	40	—
1975	26	−5.97%
1982	27	+0.54%
1990	20	−3.68%
1999	26	+2.96%
2007	32	+2.63%
2012	22	−7.22%
2017	21	−0.93%
2023	24	+2.25%
Source: INSEE

== See also ==
- Communes of the Ariège department
