= Gourbit =

Commune in Occitanie, France

- Commune
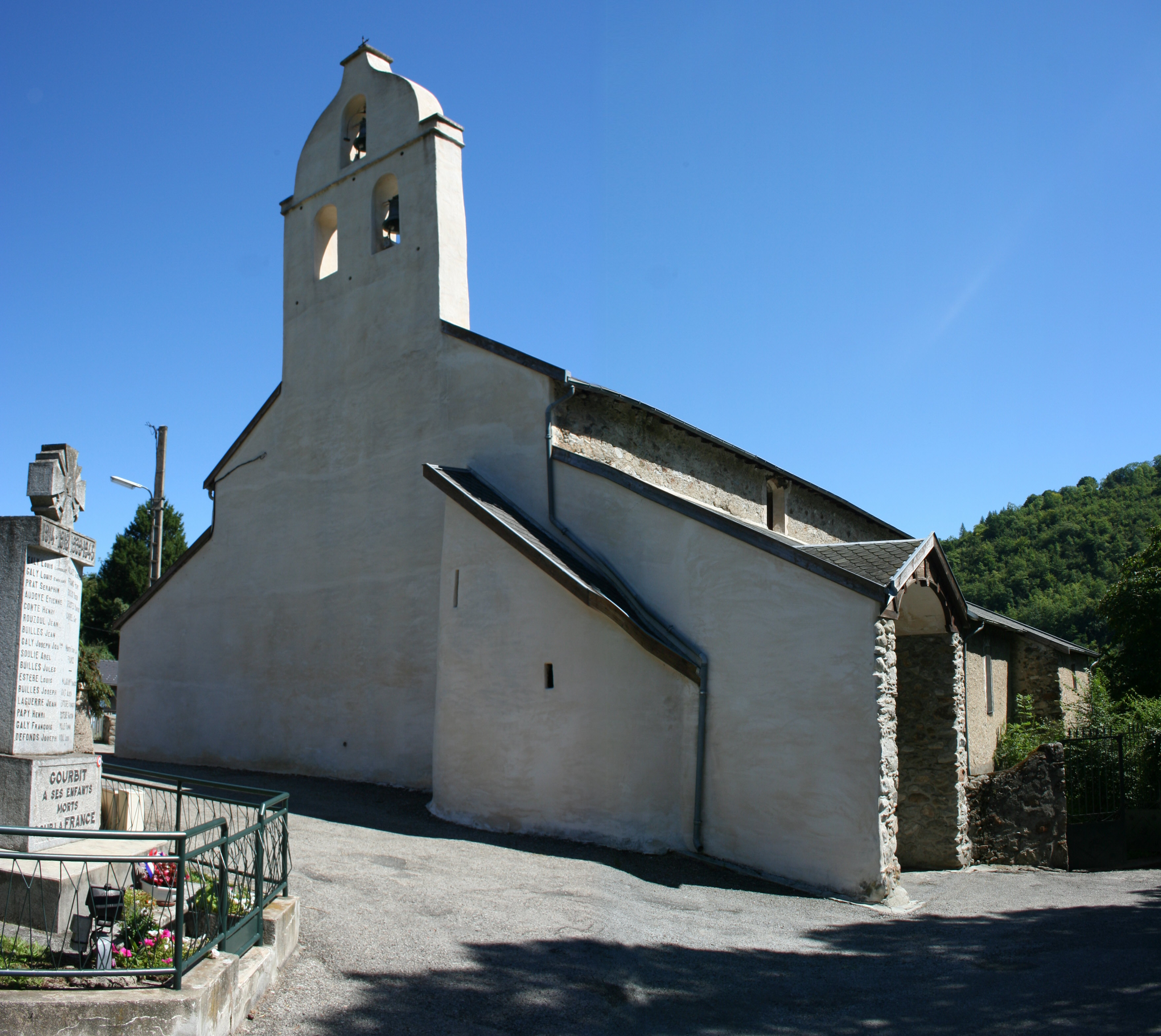
- The church in Gourbit
- Location of Gourbit
- Location within France Location within Occitanie
- Coordinates: 42°50′41″N 1°32′01″E
- Country: France
- Region: Occitania
- Department: Ariège
- Arrondissement: Foix
- Canton: Sabarthès
- Intercommunality: Pays de Tarascon

Government
  - Mayor (2020–2026): Bernard Deffarges
- Area^{1}: 17.95 km^{2} (6.93 sq mi)
- Elevation: 800 m (2,600 ft)
- Highest elevation: 2,162 m (7,093 ft)
- Lowest elevation: 671 m (2,201 ft)
- Population (2023): 82
  - Density: 4.6/km^{2} (12/sq mi)
- Time zone: UTC+01:00 (CET)
  - Summer (DST): UTC+02:00 (CEST)
- INSEE/Postal code: 09136 /09400
- ^{1} French Land Register data, which excludes lakes, ponds, glaciers > 1 km^{2} (0.386 sq mi or 247 acres) and river estuaries.

Gourbit (French pronunciation: [ɡuʁbit]; Occitan: Gorbit) is a commune in the Ariège department in southwestern France.

== Population ==
Historical population
Year	Pop.	±% p.a.
1968	71	—
1975	87	+2.95%
1982	82	−0.84%
1990	69	−2.13%
1999	61	−1.36%
2007	91	+5.13%
2012	95	+0.86%
2017	76	−4.36%
2023	82	+1.27%
Source: INSEE

== See also ==
- Communes of the Ariège department
