= Capoulet-et-Junac =

Commune in Occitanie, France

- Commune
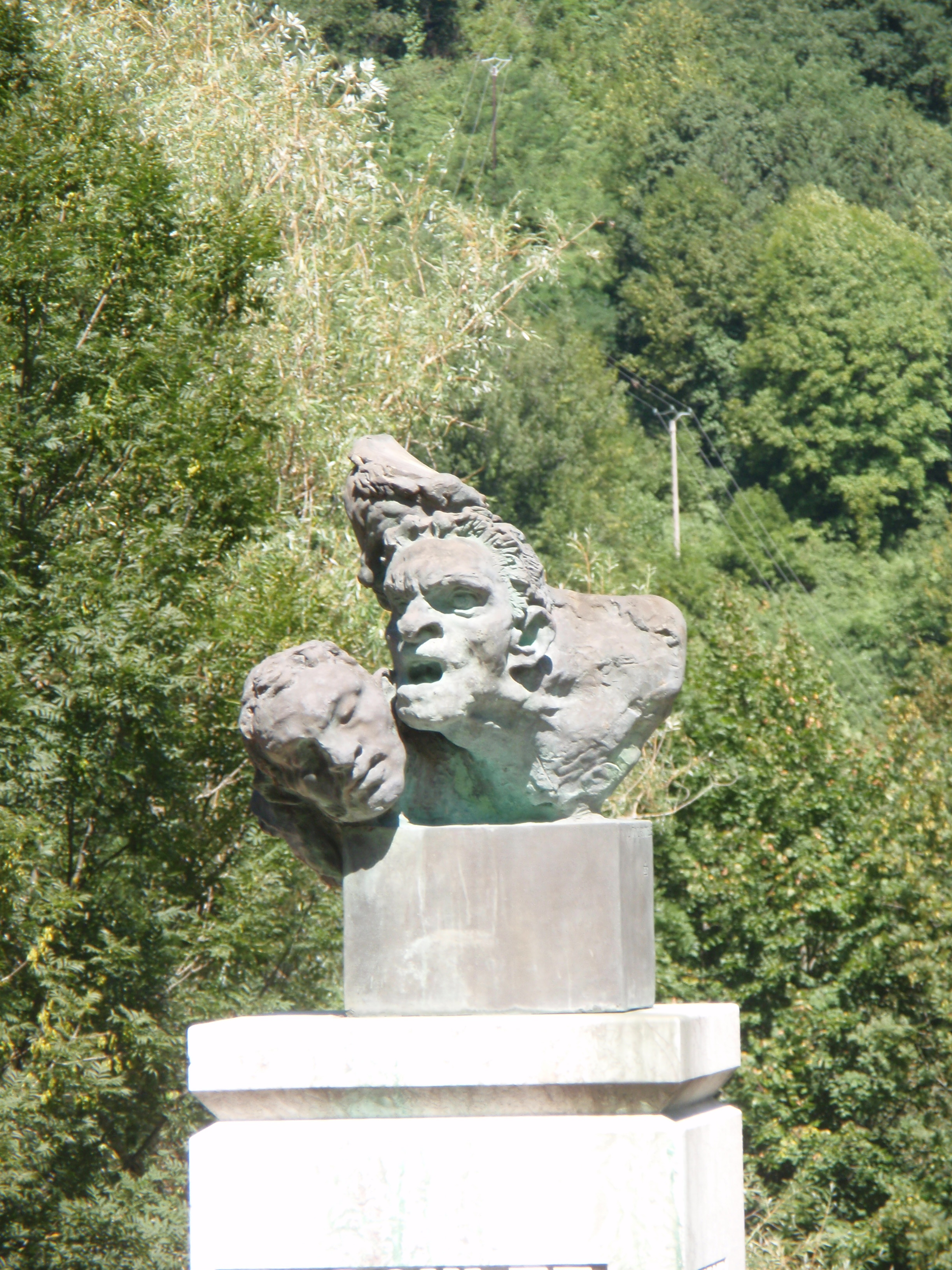
- War memorial, sculptor Antoine Bourdelle
- Location of Capoulet-et-Junac
- Location within France Location within Occitanie
- Coordinates: 42°47′48″N 1°35′11″E
- Country: France
- Region: Occitania
- Department: Ariège
- Arrondissement: Foix
- Canton: Sabarthès

Government
  - Mayor (2020–2026): Christian Lacassin
- Area^{1}: 2.78 km^{2} (1.07 sq mi)
- Elevation: 590 m (1,940 ft)
- Highest elevation: 933 m (3,061 ft)
- Lowest elevation: 559 m (1,834 ft)
- Population (2023): 191
  - Density: 68.7/km^{2} (178/sq mi)
- Time zone: UTC+01:00 (CET)
  - Summer (DST): UTC+02:00 (CEST)
- INSEE/Postal code: 09077 /09400
- ^{1} French Land Register data, which excludes lakes, ponds, glaciers > 1 km^{2} (0.386 sq mi or 247 acres) and river estuaries.

Capoulet-et-Junac (French pronunciation: [kapulɛ e ʒynak]; Occitan: Capoleg e Junac) is a commune in the Ariège department in southwestern France.

== Population ==
Historical population
| Year | Pop. | ±% p.a. |
|---|---|---|
| 1968 | 189 | — |
| 1975 | 173 | −1.26% |
| 1982 | 158 | −1.29% |
| 1990 | 194 | +2.60% |
| 1999 | 194 | +0.00% |
| 2007 | 175 | −1.28% |
| 2012 | 184 | +1.01% |
| 2017 | 168 | −1.80% |
| 2023 | 191 | +2.16% |
Source: INSEE

== See also ==
- Communes of the Ariège department
