= Surba =

Commune in Occitanie, France

- Commune
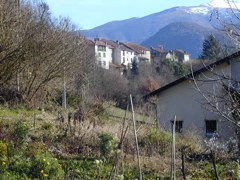
- A general view of Surba
- Location of Surba
- Location within France Location within Occitanie
- Coordinates: 42°51′35″N 1°34′33″E
- Country: France
- Region: Occitania
- Department: Ariège
- Arrondissement: Foix
- Canton: Sabarthès
- Intercommunality: Pays de Tarascon

Government
  - Mayor (2020–2026): Henri Aychet
- Area^{1}: 2.22 km^{2} (0.86 sq mi)
- Elevation: 558 m (1,831 ft)
- Highest elevation: 1,064 m (3,491 ft)
- Lowest elevation: 469 m (1,539 ft)
- Population (2023): 340
  - Density: 150/km^{2} (400/sq mi)
- Time zone: UTC+01:00 (CET)
  - Summer (DST): UTC+02:00 (CEST)
- INSEE/Postal code: 09303 /09400
- ^{1} French Land Register data, which excludes lakes, ponds, glaciers > 1 km^{2} (0.386 sq mi or 247 acres) and river estuaries.

Surba (French pronunciation: [syʁba]; Occitan: Surban) is a commune in the Ariège department in southwestern France.

== Population ==
Inhabitants of Surba are called Surbatois in French.

Historical population
Year	Pop.	±% p.a.
1968	179	—
1975	234	+3.90%
1982	320	+4.57%
1990	381	+2.20%
1999	345	−1.10%
2007	350	+0.18%
2012	350	+0.00%
2017	325	−1.47%
2023	340	+0.75%
Source: INSEE

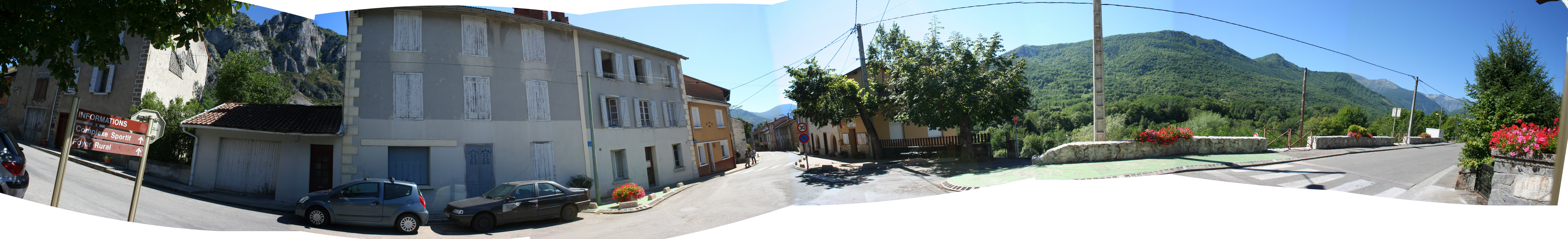
Center of the village

== See also ==
- Communes of the Ariège department
