= Illier-et-Laramade =

Commune in Occitanie, France

- Commune
- Location of Illier-et-Laramade
- Location within France Location within Occitanie
- Coordinates: 42°47′18″N 1°32′25″E
- Country: France
- Region: Occitania
- Department: Ariège
- Arrondissement: Foix
- Canton: Sabarthès

Government
  - Mayor (2020–2026): André Dupuy
- Area^{1}: 5.02 km^{2} (1.94 sq mi)
- Elevation: 850 m (2,790 ft)
- Highest elevation: 1,804 m (5,919 ft)
- Lowest elevation: 621 m (2,037 ft)
- Population (2023): 39
  - Density: 7.8/km^{2} (20/sq mi)
- Time zone: UTC+01:00 (CET)
  - Summer (DST): UTC+02:00 (CEST)
- INSEE/Postal code: 09143 /09220
- ^{1} French Land Register data, which excludes lakes, ponds, glaciers > 1 km^{2} (0.386 sq mi or 247 acres) and river estuaries.

Illier-et-Laramade (French pronunciation: [ilje e laʁamad]; Occitan: Ilièr e la Ramada) is a commune in the Ariège department in southwestern France.

== Population ==
Historical population
Year	Pop.	±% p.a.
1968	36	—
1975	30	−2.57%
1982	36	+2.64%
1990	31	−1.85%
1999	20	−4.75%
2007	21	+0.61%
2012	20	−0.97%
2017	25	+4.56%
2023	39	+7.69%
Source: INSEE

== See also ==
- Communes of the Ariège department
