= Canton of Sabarthès =

Coordinates: 42.85°N 1.60°E

Canton of Portes du Sabarthès
- Canton
- Situation of the canton of Sabarthès in the department of Ariège
- Country: France
- Region: Occitania
- Department: Ariège
- No. of communes: {{{nbcomm}}}
- Population (2023): 11,720
- INSEE code: 0912

The canton of Sabarthès is an administrative division of the Ariège department, southern France. It was created at the French canton reorganisation which came into effect in March 2015. Its seat is in Tarascon-sur-Ariège.

It consists of the following communes:

1. Alliat
2. Arignac
3. Arnave
4. Auzat
5. Bédeilhac-et-Aynat
6. Bompas
7. Capoulet-et-Junac
8. Cazenave-Serres-et-Allens
9. Celles
10. Génat
11. Gestiès
12. Gourbit
13. Illier-et-Laramade
14. Lapège
15. Lercoul
16. Mercus-Garrabet
17. Miglos
18. Montoulieu
19. Niaux
20. Orus
21. Prayols
22. Quié
23. Rabat-les-Trois-Seigneurs
24. Saint-Paul-de-Jarrat
25. Saurat
26. Siguer
27. Surba
28. Tarascon-sur-Ariège
29. Val-de-Sos
