= Quié =

Commune in Occitanie, France

- Commune
- Location of Quié
- Location within France Location within Occitanie
- Coordinates: 42°50′49″N 1°35′42″E
- Country: France
- Region: Occitania
- Department: Ariège
- Arrondissement: Foix
- Canton: Sabarthès
- Intercommunality: Pays de Tarascon

Government
  - Mayor (2020–2026): Jean-Bernard Fournie
- Area^{1}: 2.51 km^{2} (0.97 sq mi)
- Elevation: 490 m (1,610 ft)
- Highest elevation: 1,040 m (3,410 ft)
- Lowest elevation: 475 m (1,558 ft)
- Population (2023): 297
  - Density: 118/km^{2} (306/sq mi)
- Time zone: UTC+01:00 (CET)
  - Summer (DST): UTC+02:00 (CEST)
- INSEE/Postal code: 09240 /09400
- ^{1} French Land Register data, which excludes lakes, ponds, glaciers > 1 km^{2} (0.386 sq mi or 247 acres) and river estuaries.

Quié (French pronunciation: [kje]; Occitan: Quièr) is a commune in the Ariège department in southwestern France.

== Population ==
Inhabitants are called Quiétois in French.

Historical population
Year	Pop.	±% p.a.
1968	382	—
1975	421	+1.40%
1982	411	−0.34%
1990	387	−0.75%
1999	346	−1.24%
2007	340	−0.22%
2012	288	−3.27%
2017	302	+0.95%
2023	297	−0.28%
Source: INSEE

== See also ==
- Communes of the Ariège department
