= Gestiès =

Commune in Occitanie, France

- Commune
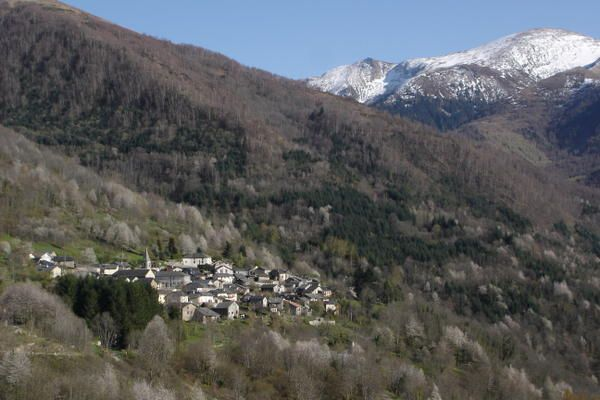
- A general view of Gestiès
- Location of Gestiès
- Location within France Location within Occitanie
- Coordinates: 42°46′00″N 1°34′28″E
- Country: France
- Region: Occitania
- Department: Ariège
- Arrondissement: Foix
- Canton: Sabarthès

Government
  - Mayor (2020–2026): Alain Marfaing
- Area^{1}: 27.46 km^{2} (10.60 sq mi)
- Elevation: 940 m (3,080 ft)
- Highest elevation: 2,742 m (8,996 ft)
- Lowest elevation: 827 m (2,713 ft)
- Population (2023): 38
  - Density: 1.4/km^{2} (3.6/sq mi)
- Time zone: UTC+01:00 (CET)
  - Summer (DST): UTC+02:00 (CEST)
- INSEE/Postal code: 09134 /09220
- ^{1} French Land Register data, which excludes lakes, ponds, glaciers > 1 km^{2} (0.386 sq mi or 247 acres) and river estuaries.

Gestiès (French pronunciation: [ʒɛstjɛs]; Occitan: Gestièrs) is a commune in the Ariège department in southwestern France.

== Population ==
Inhabitants of Gestiès are called Gestiérois.

Historical population
Year	Pop.	±% p.a.
1968	42	—
1975	41	−0.34%
1982	34	−2.64%
1990	21	−5.85%
1999	10	−7.91%
2007	9	−1.31%
2012	17	+13.56%
2017	28	+10.49%
2023	38	+5.22%
Source: INSEE

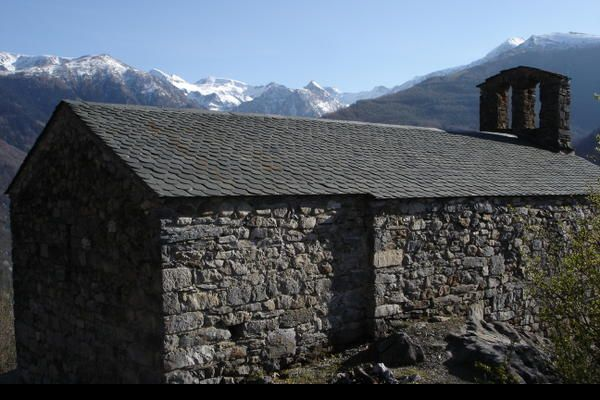
Chapel of Saint Nicholas

== See also ==
- Communes of the Ariège department
