= Bédeilhac Cave =

Cave in France containing Paleolithic paintings

- Grotte de Bédeilhac (French)
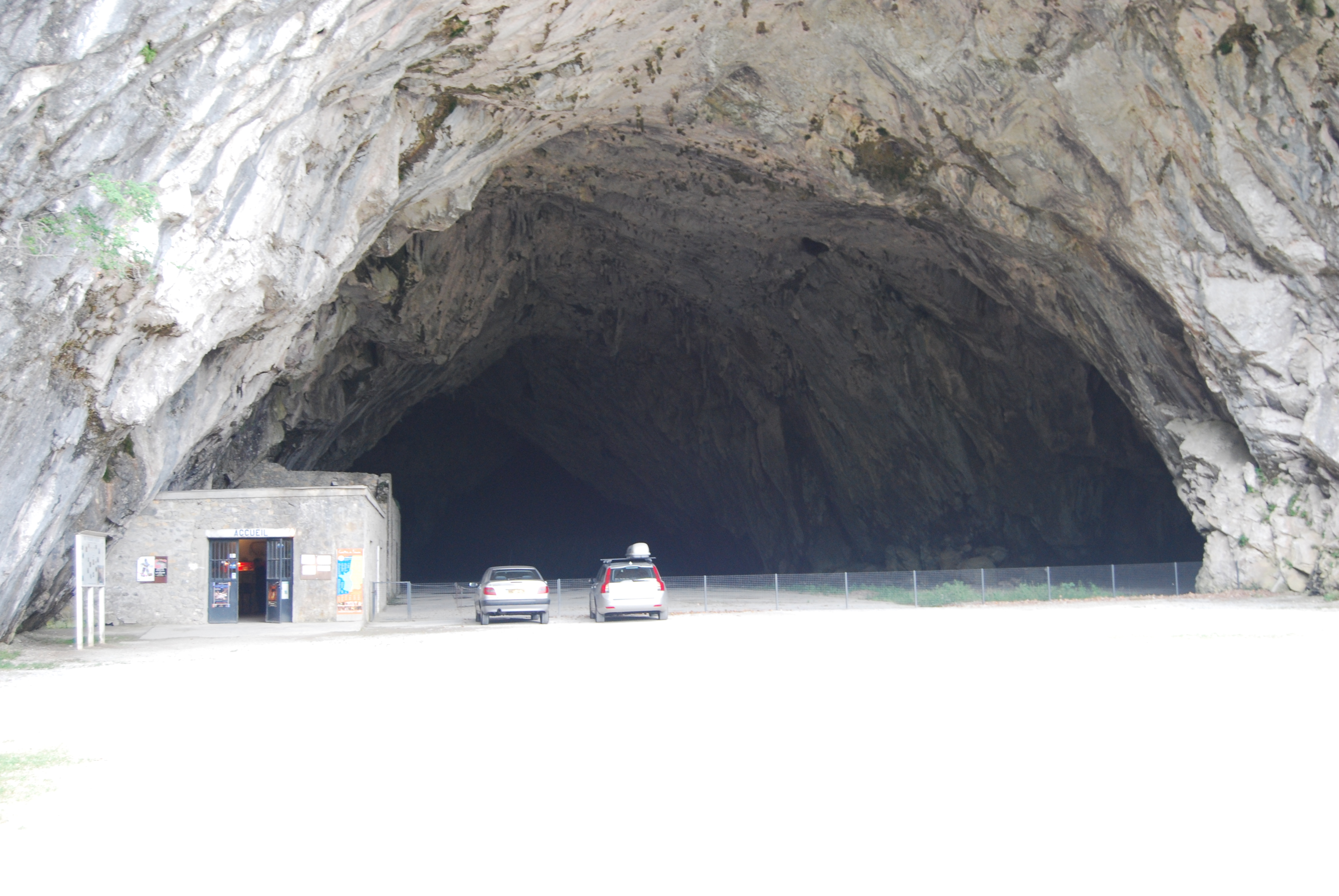
- Cave entrance

- Location in Occitania, France
- 42.871389°N 1.570556°E
- Periods: Palaeolithic
- Location: Bédeilhac-et-Aynat
- Region: Ariège

Site notes
- Elevation: 690 m (2,260 ft)
- Length: 2,240 m (7,350 ft)

The Bédeilhac Cave (French: Grotte de Bédeilhac) is a large decorated cave located in the commune of Bédeilhac-et-Aynat in Ariège, France. It is part of the network of decorated caves in the Pyrenees-Cantabrian Mountains chain.

== Speleology ==
The cumulative length of the interconnected galleries that make up the underground network is 2,240 m.

== Geography and geological context ==
The Bédeilhac Cave is located in the Saurat Valley, in the commune of Bédeilhac-et-Aynat, near Tarascon-sur-Ariège, at an altitude of 690 m. It opens onto the mountainside and extends 750 m into the Soudour massif. The cave is carved into Lower Cretaceous limestone.

== History ==
=== Inhabitation ===
Humans have known and frequented the prehistoric cave of Bédeilhac for at least 15,000 years.

=== Modern discovery ===
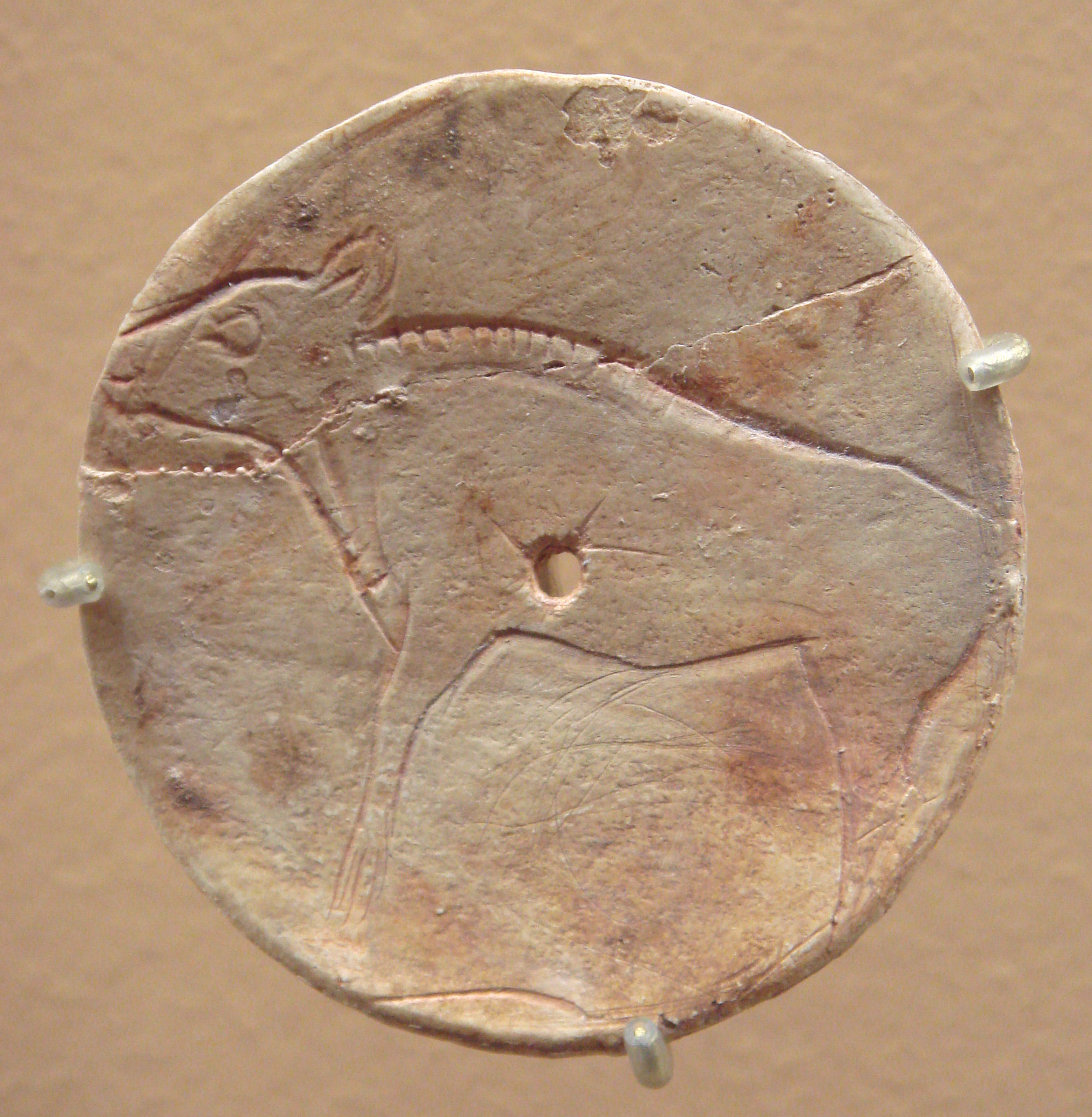
Magdalenian engraved plaque showing a young European bison (Bison bonasus).

The cave, known for millennia, was visited and described as early as 1773 by Marcorelle.

In July 1906, a Paleolithic cave painting was discovered and authenticated by Abbé Henri Breuil, the first in the Ariège department.

The cave was explored several times, and Messrs. Cartailhac, Vidal, and Mandement made discoveries there. Following the discovery of several paintings, engravings, and clay sculptures, the cave was listed as a Historic Monument in 1929.

=== The German aircraft legend ===
Due to its large size, the cave was used as a warehouse during the Second World War. Legend has it that the German Air Force set up an airfield there; however, this rumour is contradicted by the historical facts.

In fact, the cave was requisitioned from 1 June 1940 for the Dewoitine aeronautical factories, which constructed the path which leads to the cave, and began to level its entrance with the aim of installing workshops there to produce parts for its aircraft. The defeat of the French army put an end to this enterprise: the factory was dismantled at the beginning of July of the same year. The German occupation troops took up the idea again and took control of the cave from May 1944 for the restoration of their Junkers aircraft: they continued the levelling and concreting of the entrance started by Dewoitine to install their machine tools there. The Germans abandoned the site on 15 August 1944, leaving eight Junker carcasses, the tools and the barracks installed for the personnel.

The Bédeilhac Cave was the scene of an event on 1 July 1972. Test pilot Georges Bonnet, at the controls of a small tourist plane (Morane type), succeeded in landing in the cave. He repeated his feat in 1974, during the filming of the film Le Passe Montagne, based on a novel by Christian Bernadac. A replica of this plane is located at the beginning of the visitor route.

=== Media firsts ===
The site was the subject of one of the first films shot underground in 1929. In 1958, caver Norbert Casteret and his daughter Raymonde, as well as José Bidegain, Joseph Delteil and Georges Lépineux, took part in the first live television report from a cave from Bédeilhac, presented by Georges de Caunes.

== Description of the cave ==
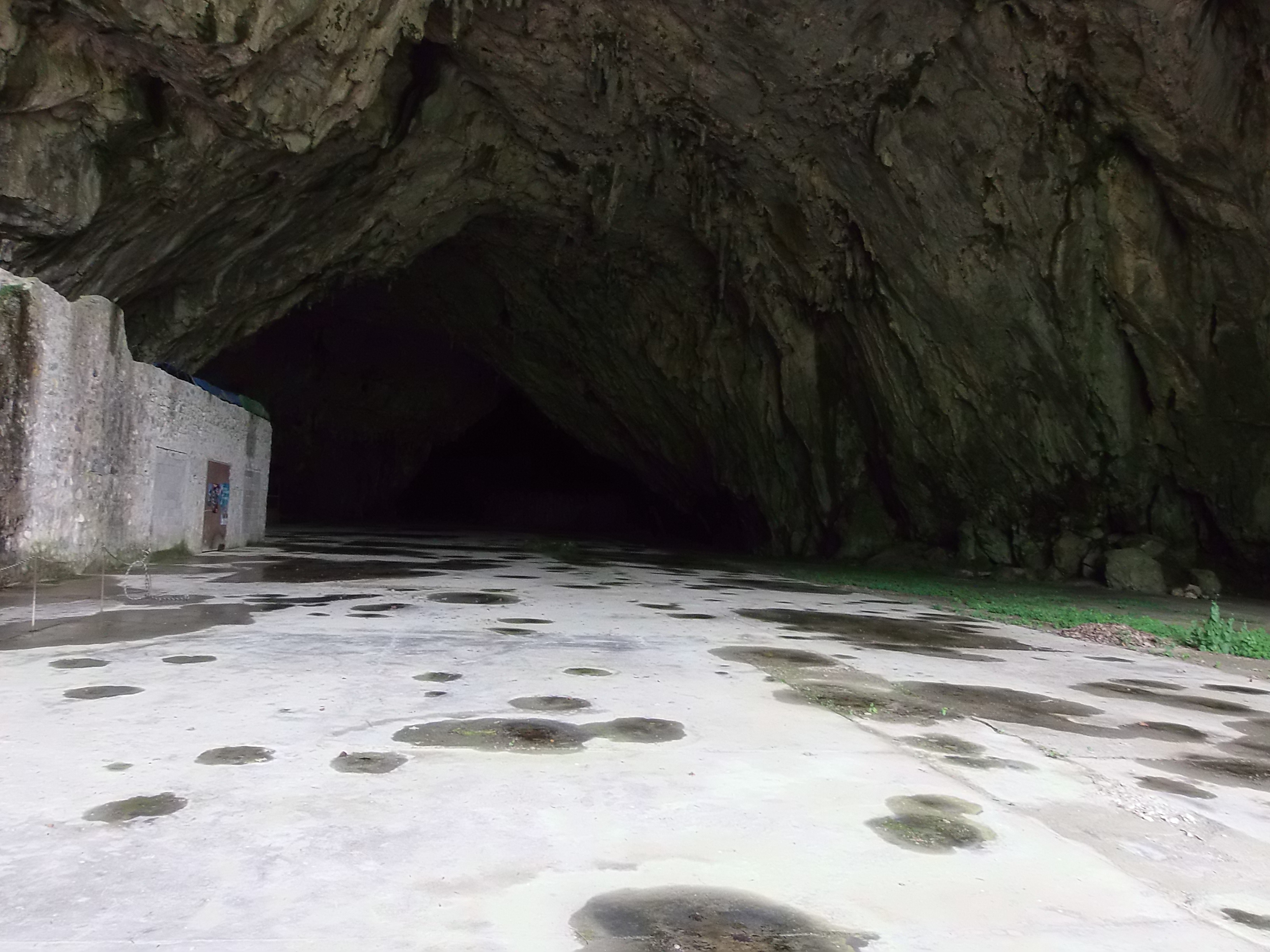
Entrance to Bédeilhac Cave.

The prehistoric cave of Bédeilhac is very large, with an opening 40 m wide extending for over 1 km, and whose vault sometimes rises up to 80 m above the ground. The entrance to the cave has been levelled for approximately 350 m.

The site includes stalagmites, and prehistoric works from the Magdalenian period, distributed in several rooms: a large gallery, the room with the largest dimensions, a labyrinth, a gallery of sculptures, the Vidal gallery and a terminal room. The rock art of the cave illustrates the techniques known in other Magdalenian works.

In the large gallery are a stalagmitic concretion called the holy water font, a painted bison from the Magdalenian period, a large stalagmitic pillar, and positive handprints from the Magdalenian period. The labyrinth has a set of stalagmitic pillars. The gallery of sculptures includes clay models from the Magdalenian period, bas-reliefs modelled on clay, and a headless horse from the Magdalenian period. In the Vidal gallery is a bison head from the Magdalenian period. The final room contains clay engravings from the Magdalenian period (bison, horse and a vulva traced with a finger), and a charcoal bison from the Magdalenian period.

There is also a fireplace location, as well as a number of objects including a perforated bead.

== Bibliography ==
- G. Vidal, L'art dans les cavernes de Tarascon-sur-Ariège, Bull. Soc. Ariégeoise Sciences, Lettres et Arts, t. XVIII, 1932, p. 54-77.
- M. Barbaza, Bédeilhac-et-Aynat - Grotte de Bédeilhac, Bilan Scientifique, SRA, DRAC Midi-Pyrénées, 1993, p. 28.
- M. Barbaza et S. Lacombes, Bédeilhac-et-Aynat - Grotte de Bédeilhac, Bilan Scientifique, SRA, DRAC Midi-Pyrénées, 1994, p. 28-29.
- Antonio Beltràn, Romain Robert et René Gailli, La cueva de Bédeilhac, Zaragoza, Departamento de Prehistoria y Arqueologia, coll. Monografias arqueologicas (no. 2), 1967, 146 p..
- René Gailli, N. Pailhaugue et F. Rouzaud, Grotte de Bédeilhac, dans L'Art des cavernes, Paris, Ministère de la Culture, 1984, p. 369-375.
- René Gailli et Jean-Pierre Duhard, Les représentations humaines de la grotte magdalénienne de Bédeilhac, dans Pyrénées préhistoriques : arts et société (actes du 118e congrès national des sociétés savantes (Pau, 1993)), Paris, éd. du Comité des travaux historiques et scientifiques, 1996, p. 403-413.

== See also ==
- Nearby prehistoric caves:
  - Grotte de La Vache
  - Lombrives caves
  - Grotte de Sabart
  - Niaux Cave
- Magdalenian
- List of caves in France
