= Cazenave-Serres-et-Allens =

Commune in Occitanie, France

- Commune
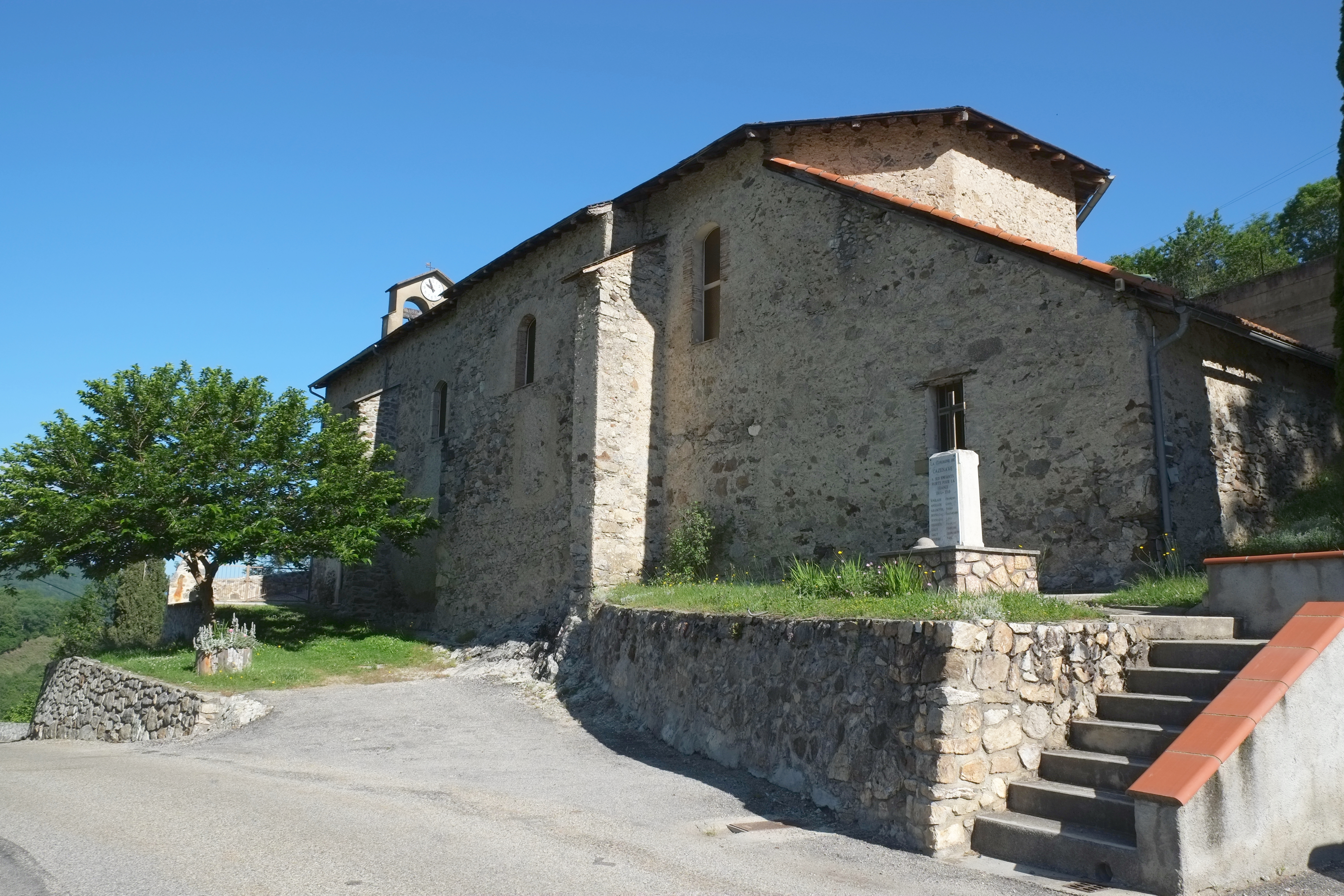
- The church in Cazenave-Serres-et-Allens
- Location of Cazenave-Serres-et-Allens
- Location within France Location within Occitanie
- Coordinates: 42°50′28″N 1°40′24″E
- Country: France
- Region: Occitania
- Department: Ariège
- Arrondissement: Foix
- Canton: Sabarthès
- Intercommunality: Pays de Tarascon

Government
  - Mayor (2020–2026): François Vermont
- Area^{1}: 16.15 km^{2} (6.24 sq mi)
- Highest elevation: 2,001 m (6,565 ft)
- Lowest elevation: 714 m (2,343 ft)
- Population (2023): 66
  - Density: 4.1/km^{2} (11/sq mi)
- Time zone: UTC+01:00 (CET)
  - Summer (DST): UTC+02:00 (CEST)
- INSEE/Postal code: 09092 /09400
- ^{1} French Land Register data, which excludes lakes, ponds, glaciers > 1 km^{2} (0.386 sq mi or 247 acres) and river estuaries.

Cazenave-Serres-et-Allens (Occitan: Transportador Estanhs e Allens) is a commune in the Ariège department in southwestern France.

== Population ==
Historical population
Year	Pop.	±% p.a.
1968	38	—
1975	25	−5.81%
1982	28	+1.63%
1990	30	+0.87%
1999	49	+5.60%
2007	52	+0.75%
2012	44	−3.29%
2017	51	+3.00%
2023	66	+4.39%
Source: INSEE

== See also ==
- Communes of the Ariège department
