= Lercoul =

Commune in Occitanie, France

- Commune
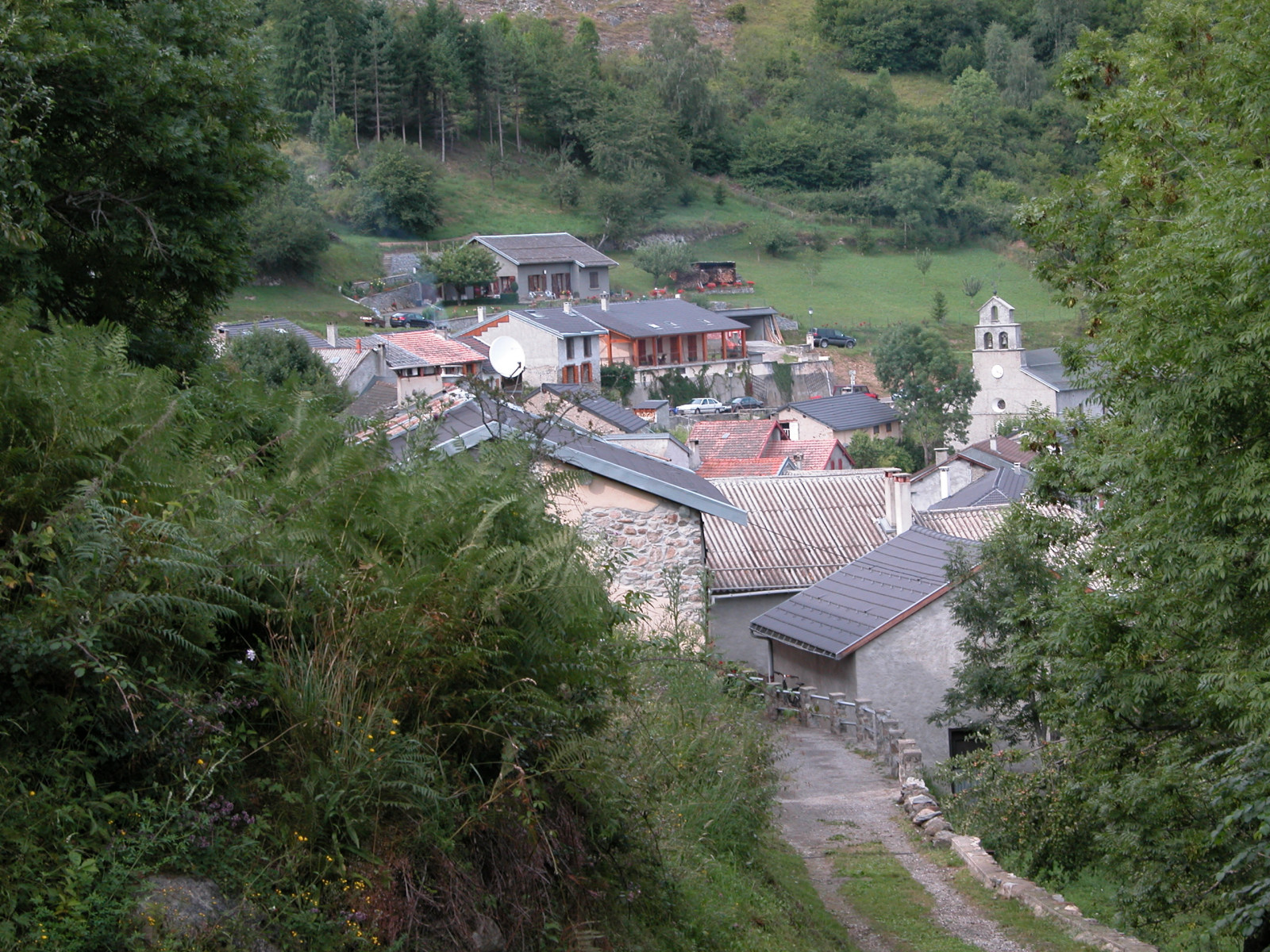
- A general view of Lercoul
- Location of Lercoul
- Location within France Location within Occitanie
- Coordinates: 42°46′14″N 1°32′47″E
- Country: France
- Region: Occitania
- Department: Ariège
- Arrondissement: Foix
- Canton: Sabarthès

Government
  - Mayor (2020–2026): François Lafon
- Area^{1}: 19.01 km^{2} (7.34 sq mi)
- Elevation: 1,158 m (3,799 ft)
- Highest elevation: 2,876 m (9,436 ft)
- Lowest elevation: 826 m (2,710 ft)
- Population (2023): 11
  - Density: 0.58/km^{2} (1.5/sq mi)
- Time zone: UTC+01:00 (CET)
  - Summer (DST): UTC+02:00 (CEST)
- INSEE/Postal code: 09162 /09220
- ^{1} French Land Register data, which excludes lakes, ponds, glaciers > 1 km^{2} (0.386 sq mi or 247 acres) and river estuaries.

Lercoul (French pronunciation: [lɛʁkul]; Occitan: Lercol) is a commune in the Ariège department in southwestern France.

== Population ==
Historical population
Year	Pop.	±% p.a.
1968	8	—
1975	5	−6.49%
1982	19	+21.01%
1990	21	+1.26%
1999	18	−1.70%
2007	30	+6.59%
2012	24	−4.36%
2017	22	−1.73%
2023	11	−10.91%
Source: INSEE

== See also ==
- Communes of the Ariège department
