= Siguer =

Commune in Occitanie, France

- Commune
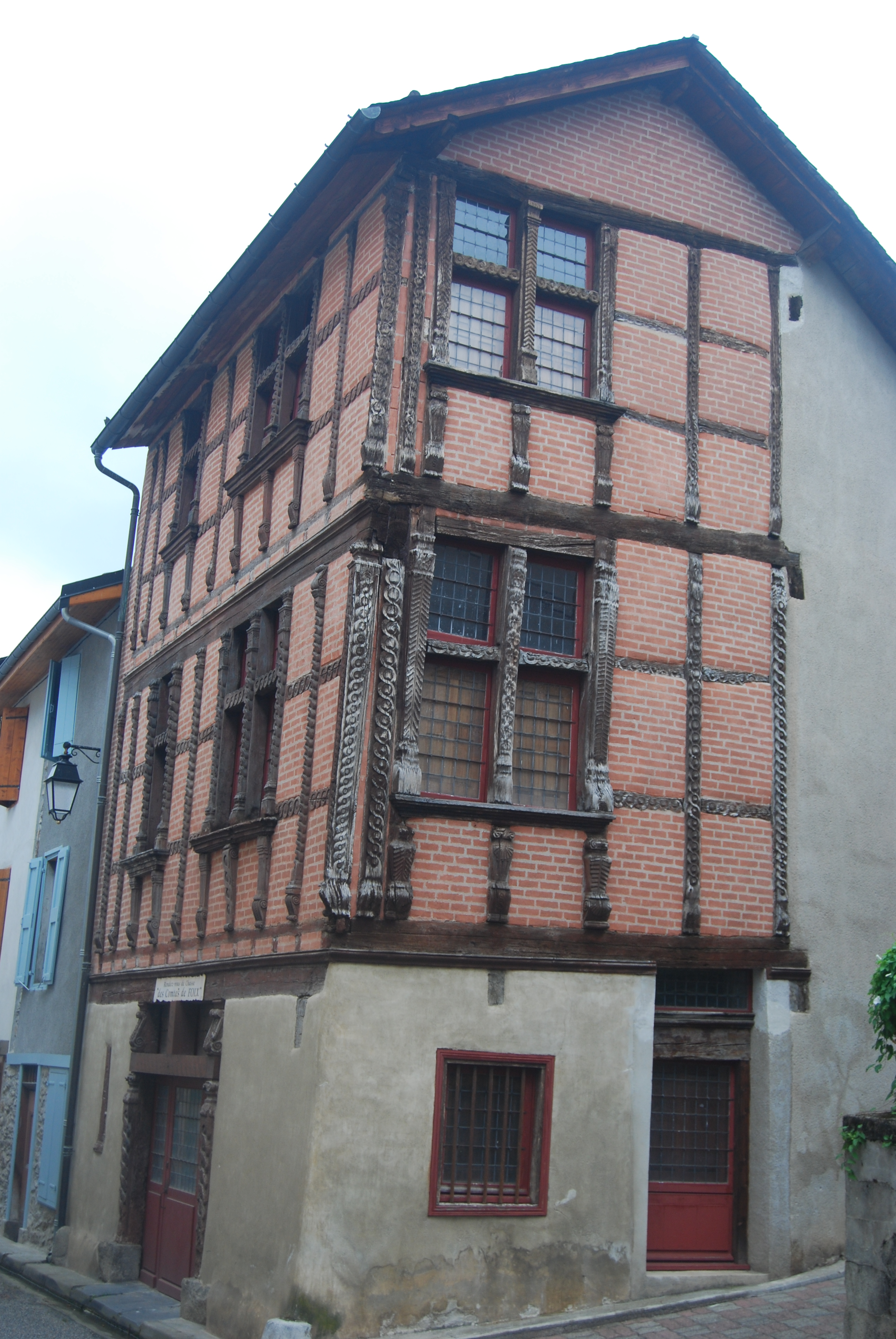
- Home of the counts of Foix

- Coat of arms
- Location of Siguer
- Location within France Location within Occitanie
- Coordinates: 42°45′55″N 1°33′59″E
- Country: France
- Region: Occitania
- Department: Ariège
- Arrondissement: Foix
- Canton: Sabarthès

Government
  - Mayor (2020–2026): Marie-Line Caujolle
- Area^{1}: 38.73 km^{2} (14.95 sq mi)
- Elevation: 745 m (2,444 ft)
- Highest elevation: 2,902 m (9,521 ft)
- Lowest elevation: 615 m (2,018 ft)
- Population (2023): 96
  - Density: 2.5/km^{2} (6.4/sq mi)
- Time zone: UTC+01:00 (CET)
  - Summer (DST): UTC+02:00 (CEST)
- INSEE/Postal code: 09295 /09220
- ^{1} French Land Register data, which excludes lakes, ponds, glaciers > 1 km^{2} (0.386 sq mi or 247 acres) and river estuaries.

Siguer (French pronunciation: [siɡɛʁ]; Occitan: Siguèr) is a commune in the Ariège department in southwestern France.

== Population ==
Historical population
Year	Pop.	±% p.a.
1968	89	—
1975	76	−2.23%
1982	93	+2.93%
1990	65	−4.38%
1999	96	+4.43%
2007	87	−1.22%
2012	104	+3.63%
2017	98	−1.18%
2023	96	−0.34%
Source: INSEE

Inhabitants of Siguer are called Siguerois in French.

== See also ==
- Communes of the Ariège department
