= Bompas, Ariège =

Commune in Occitanie, France

Bompas
- Commune
- Coat of arms
- Location of Bompas
- Location within France Location within Occitanie
- Coordinates: 42°51′56″N 1°37′05″E
- Country: France
- Region: Occitania
- Department: Ariège
- Arrondissement: Foix
- Canton: Sabarthès
- Intercommunality: Pays de Tarascon

Government
  - Mayor (2020–2026): Joseph Goncalves
- Area^{1}: 2.75 km^{2} (1.06 sq mi)
- Elevation: 375 m (1,230 ft)
- Highest elevation: 884 m (2,900 ft)
- Lowest elevation: 466 m (1,529 ft)
- Population (2023): 206
  - Density: 74.9/km^{2} (194/sq mi)
- Time zone: UTC+01:00 (CET)
  - Summer (DST): UTC+02:00 (CEST)
- INSEE/Postal code: 09058 /09400
- ^{1} French Land Register data, which excludes lakes, ponds, glaciers > 1 km^{2} (0.386 sq mi or 247 acres) and river estuaries.

Bompas (French pronunciation: [bɔ̃pas]; Occitan: Bompàs) is a commune in the Ariège department of southwestern France.

== Population ==
Historical population
Year	Pop.	±% p.a.
1968	159	—
1975	155	−0.36%
1982	145	−0.95%
1990	214	+4.99%
1999	198	−0.86%
2007	202	+0.25%
2012	205	+0.30%
2017	195	−1.00%
2023	206	+0.92%
Source: INSEE

Inhabitants of Bompas are called Bompasais in French.

== See also ==
- Communes of the Ariège department
