= Bédeilhac-et-Aynat =

Commune in Occitanie, France

- Commune
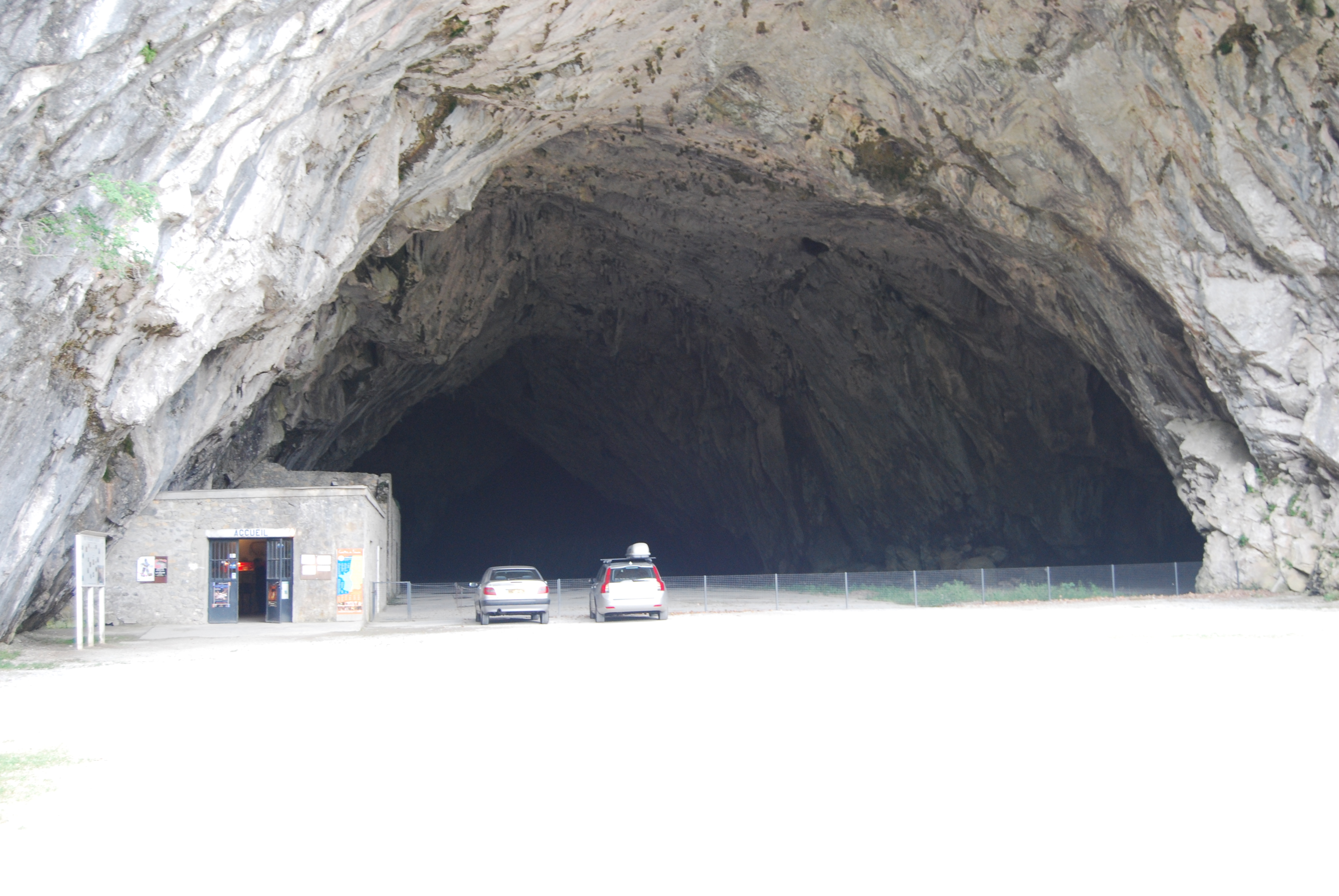
- Entrance to the Bédeilhac Cave
- Location of Bédeilhac-et-Aynat
- Location within France Location within Occitanie
- Coordinates: 42°52′24″N 1°33′55″E
- Country: France
- Region: Occitania
- Department: Ariège
- Arrondissement: Foix
- Canton: Sabarthès
- Intercommunality: Pays de Tarascon

Government
  - Mayor (2020–2026): Michel Anquet
- Area^{1}: 6.38 km^{2} (2.46 sq mi)
- Elevation: 625 m (2,051 ft)
- Highest elevation: 1,424 m (4,672 ft)
- Lowest elevation: 549 m (1,801 ft)
- Population (2023): 178
  - Density: 27.9/km^{2} (72.3/sq mi)
- Time zone: UTC+01:00 (CET)
  - Summer (DST): UTC+02:00 (CEST)
- INSEE/Postal code: 09045 /09400
- ^{1} French Land Register data, which excludes lakes, ponds, glaciers > 1 km^{2} (0.386 sq mi or 247 acres) and river estuaries.

Bédeilhac-et-Aynat (French pronunciation: [bedɛjak e ɛjna]; Occitan: Vedelhac e Ainat) is a commune in the Ariège department of southwestern France.

== Population ==
Historical population
Year	Pop.	±% p.a.
1968	126	—
1975	120	−0.69%
1982	119	−0.12%
1990	136	+1.68%
1999	150	+1.09%
2007	175	+1.95%
2012	200	+2.71%
2017	192	−0.81%
2023	178	−1.25%
Source: INSEE

Inhabitants of Bédeilhac-et-Aynat are called Bédeinatois in French.

== See also ==
- Communes of the Ariège department
