= Porta, Pyrénées-Orientales =

Porta
- Commune
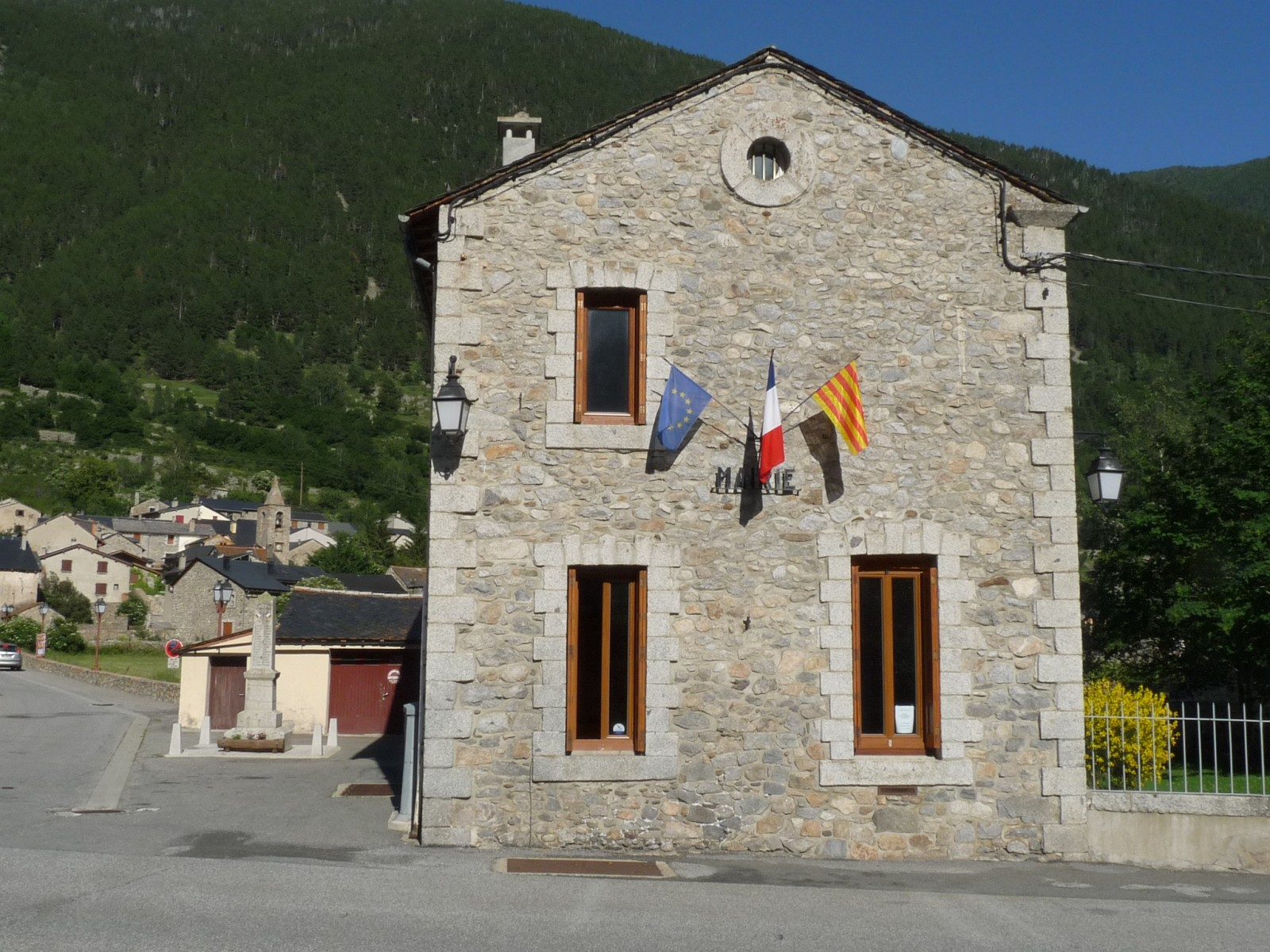
- The town hall in Porta
- Location of Porta
- Location within France Location within Occitanie
- Coordinates: 42°31′38″N 1°49′36″E
- Country: France
- Region: Occitania
- Department: Pyrénées-Orientales
- Arrondissement: Prades
- Canton: Les Pyrénées catalanes

Government
  - Mayor (2020–2026): Marius Hugon
- Area^{1}: 65.19 km^{2} (25.17 sq mi)
- Elevation: 1,510 m (4,950 ft)
- Highest elevation: 2,907 m (9,537 ft)
- Lowest elevation: 1,325 m (4,347 ft)
- Population (2023): 94
  - Density: 1.4/km^{2} (3.7/sq mi)
- Time zone: UTC+01:00 (CET)
  - Summer (DST): UTC+02:00 (CEST)
- INSEE/Postal code: 66146 /66760
- ^{1} French Land Register data, which excludes lakes, ponds, glaciers > 1 km^{2} (0.386 sq mi or 247 acres) and river estuaries.

Porta (French pronunciation: [pɔʁta]; Catalan: Porta) is a commune in the Pyrénées-Orientales department in southern France.

== Geography ==
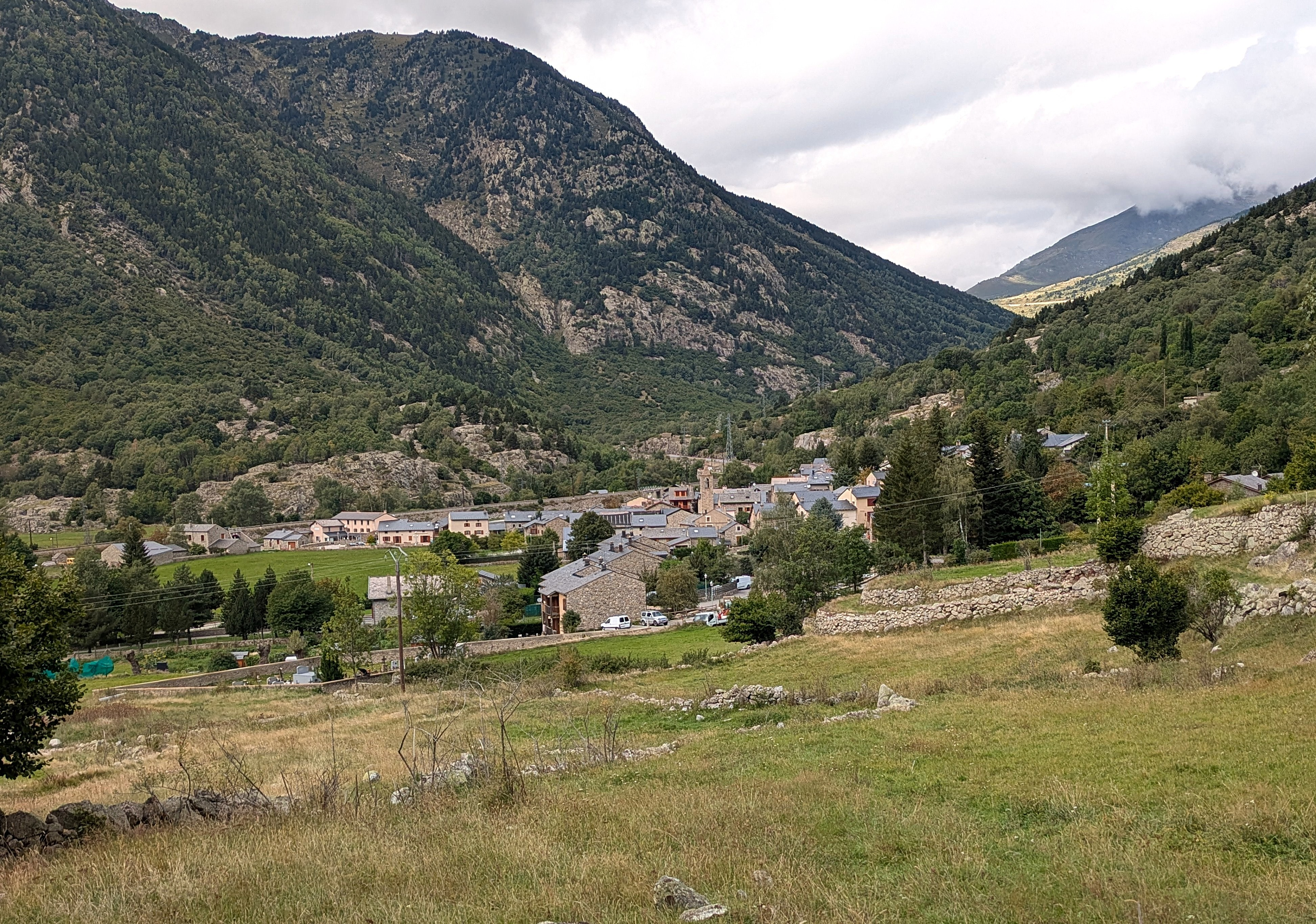
Porta village, in the Carol (or Querol) valley.

Porta is located in the canton of Les Pyrénées catalanes and in the arrondissement of Prades.

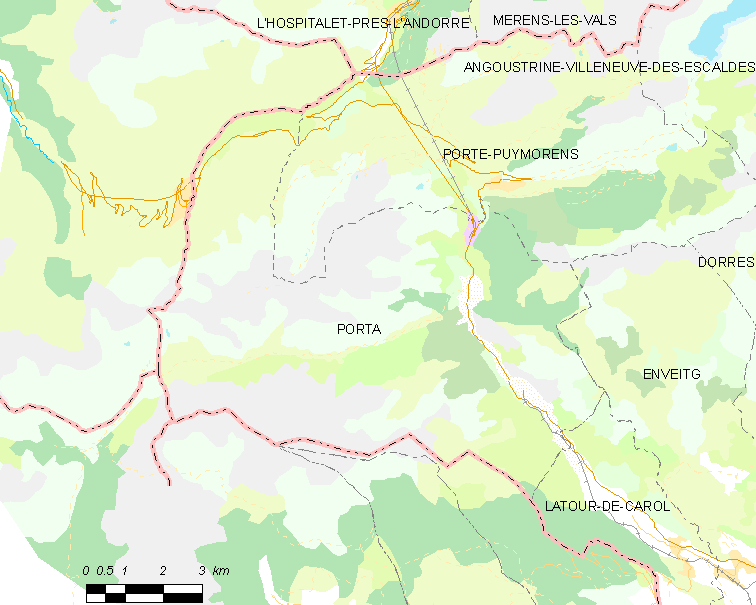
Map of Porta and its surrounding communes

== Population ==
Historical population
Year	Pop.	±% p.a.
1968	96	—
1975	79	−2.75%
1982	91	+2.04%
1990	71	−3.05%
1999	98	+3.65%
2007	134	+3.99%
2012	132	−0.30%
2017	116	−2.55%
2023	94	−3.44%
Source: INSEE

== See also ==
- Communes of the Pyrénées-Orientales department
