= Alice Taglioni =

French actress (born 1976)

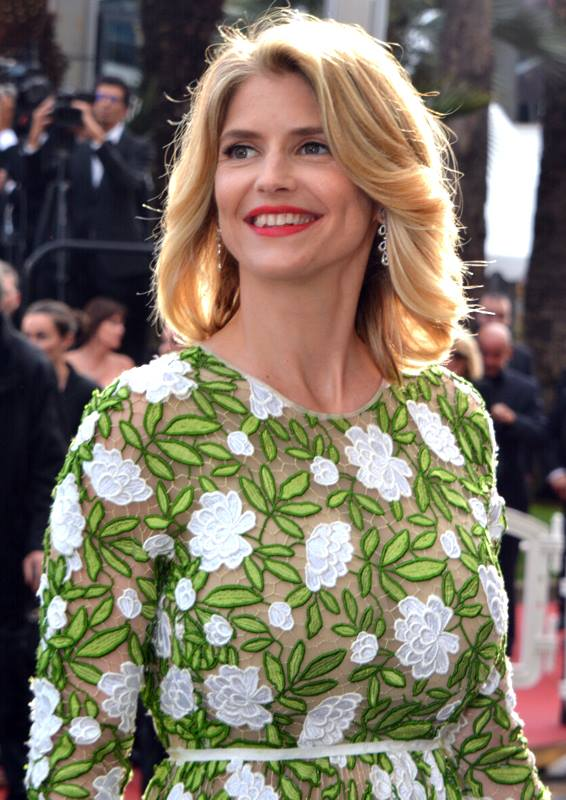
- Taglioni at the 2016 Cannes Film Festival
- Born: 26 July 1976 (age 49); Ermont, Val-d'Oise, France
- Occupation: Actress
- Partner(s): Jocelyn Quivrin (2003–2009; his death); Laurent Delahousse (2012–)
- Children: Charlie (with Jocelyn Quivrin)

Alice Taglioni (born 26 July 1976) is a French actress.

== Personal life ==
Alice Taglioni was born in Ermont, Val-d'Oise. She is the daughter of an Italian man from Lombardy. She was Miss Corsica in 1996, but refused to participate in the election of Miss France.

She met French actor Jocelyn Quivrin when they co-starred in Grande École in 2004. Their son, Charlie, was born in March 2009. Six months later, Quivrin died in a car accident.

== Filmography ==
Year	Title	Role	Director	Notes
1994	Hélène et les garçons	A fan	Gérard Espinasse	
2001	Quatre copains	Bart's friend	Stéphane Kurc	TV movie
2001	Premier nu		Jérôme Debusschère	Short
2002	Le joug		Damien Odoul	Short
2002	La bande du drugstore	Nathalie Meissonier	François Armanet	
2002	P.J.	Virginie Sonneville	Gérard Vergez	TV series (1 episode)
2002	La vie devant nous	Irène	Vincenzo Marano	TV series
2002	Jet Lag	Ground Hostess	Danièle Thompson	
2002	Ton tour viendra	Laurence	Harry Cleven	TV movie
2003	Frank Riva	Marie Forlo	Patrick Jamain	TV series (1 episode)
2003	Brocéliande	Léa	Doug Headline	
2003	Le pharmacien de garde	Christine	Jean Veber	
2003	Le Cœur des hommes	Annette	Marc Esposito	
2003	Adventure Inc.	Florence Minguet	Dennis Berry	TV series (1 episode)
2003	Rien que du bonheur	Cerise Bugues	Denis Parent	
2003	Les enquêtes d'Éloïse Rome	Joanna	Christophe Douchand	TV series (1 episode)
2004	Grande École	Agnès	Robert Salis	
2004	The Story of My Life	Claire	Laurent Tirard	
2005	L'ultimatum	Camille	Sébastien Lafarge	Short
2005	Sky Fighters	Captain Estelle 'Pitbull' Kass	Gérard Pirès	
2005	Le cactus	Justine	Gérard Bitton, Michel Munz	
2006	The Pink Panther	Female Reporter	Shawn Levy	
2006	The Valet	Elena Simonsen	Francis Veber	NRJ Ciné Awards - Actress of the Year
2007	L'île aux trésors	Evangeline Trelawney	Alain Berbérian	
2007	Acteur		Jocelyn Quivrin	Short
2007	Game of Four	Carole	Bruno Dega	
2008	Notre univers impitoyable	Lawyer Margot Dittermann	Léa Fazer	
2008	The Easy Way	Julia	Jean-Paul Rouve	
2008	Cash	Garance	Éric Besnard	
2009	Palizzi	Inès's sister	Jean Dujardin	TV series (1 episode)
2011	La Proie	Claire Linné	Eric Valette	
2012	Paris Manhattan	Alice	Sophie Lellouche	
2012	Zaytoun	Leclair	Eran Riklis	
2013	Cookie	Adeline	Léa Fazer (2)	
2013	Crossing Lines	Dominique Claire	Eric Valette (2)	TV series (1 episode)
2014	Sous les jupes des filles	Marie	Audrey Dana	
2014	Colt 45	Captain Isabelle Le Franc	Fabrice Du Welz	
2014	On a marché sur Bangkok	Natacha Bison	Olivier Baroux	
2015	Puerto Ricans in Paris	Colette	Ian Edelman	
2015	L'annonce	Annette	Julie Lopes-Curval	TV movie
2016	Heal the Living	Anne Guérande	Katell Quillévéré	
1994	Mystère au Louvre	Constance de Coulanges, 'Mercure'	Léa Fazer	Lead role
2018	Claire Darling	Young Claire Darling	Julie Bertuccelli	
2019	I Wish Someone Were Waiting for Me Somewhere	Juliette	Arnaud Viard	
2022	UFOs	Claire Carmignac		TV series
