= Alice Belaïdi =

French actress

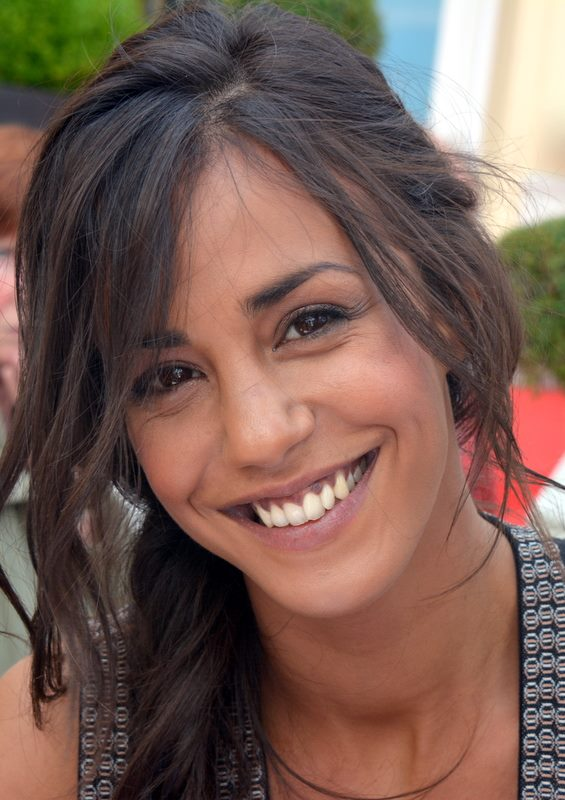
- Belaïdi at the 2014 Cabourg Film Festival
- Born: 18 March 1987 (age 39); Nîmes, France
- Occupation: Actress
- Years active: 2003–present

Alice Belaïdi (born 18 March 1987) is a French actress. She has appeared in more than 20 films and television shows since 2010.

== Theatre ==
Year	Title	Author	Director	Notes
2003	Nadia ou les malheurs d'une fille française	Corinne Levesque	Corinne Levesque	
2003	Le fantôme de Skakespeare	Philippe Avron	Philippe Avron	
2004	Mirèio	Frédéric Mistral	Gérard Gelas	
2004	Rire fragile	Philippe Avron	Philippe Avron	
2005	On ne badine pas avec l'amour	Alfred de Musset	Gérard Gelas	
2006	Contes du pays des neiges	Contes du Jataka	Gérard Gelas	
2007	Contes du toit du monde	Contes du Jataka	Gérard Gelas	
2007	Radio mon amour	Gérard Gelas	Gérard Gelas	
2008	The Moods of Marianne	Alfred de Musset	Françoise Chatôt	
2008	Mon ami Roger	Philippe Avron	Philippe Avron	
2008-11	Confidences à Allah	Saphia Azzedine	Gérard Gelas	Molière Award for Best Female Newcomer; Prix de la révélation théâtrale de l'année du Syndicat de la critique

== Filmography ==
Year	Title	Role	Director	Notes
2011	De l'huile sur le feu	Nadiya Chouffry	Nicolas Benamou	
2011	Les tribulations d'une caissière	Leïla	Pierre Rambaldi	
2011	The Bird	Latifa	Yves Caumon	
2012	Radiostars	Nassima	Romain Lévy	Alpe d'Huez International Comedy Film Festival - Coup de Coeur for Interpretation
2012	Flowers of Evil	Anahita	David Dusa	
2012	Porn in the Hood	Kadija	Franck Gastambide	
2012-2016	WorkinGirls	Sophie Marteauni	Sylvain Fusée	TV series (49 episodes)
2013	Fonzy	Sybille	Isabelle Doval	
2013	Hôtel Normandy	Sonia	Charles Nemes	
2014	Maestro	Pauline Vatel	Léa Fazer	
2014	French Women	Adeline	Audrey Dana	
2014	WorkinGirls : La grande évasion	Sophie Marteauni	Sylvain Fusée	TV movie
2014	Il était une fois... peut-être pas	Myriam	Charles Nemes	TV movie
2015	Les gorilles	Jal-Y	Tristan Aurouet	
2015	The Easy Way Out	Franette	Brice Cauvin	
2016	Odd Job	Anita	Pascal Chaumeil	
2016	Jailbirds	Samira Belhadj	Audrey Estrougo	
2016	Père fils thérapie !	Julie Benati	Émile Gaudreault	
2016	The Bureau	Sabrina Boumaza	Éric Rochant, Samuel Collardey, ...	TV series (5 episodes)
2017	The Climb	Nadia	Ludovic Bernard	
2017	If I Were a Boy	Marcelle	Audrey Dana	Alpe d'Huez International Comedy Film Festival - Supporting Performance
2018	Budapest	Cécile	Xavier Gens	
2018	La monnaie de leur pièce	Asia	Anne Le Ny	
2018	Le temps des égarés	Louise Elaoudi	Virginie Sauveur	TV movie
2018-2021	Hippocrate	Alyson Lévêque	Thomas Lilti	TV series (16 episodes); Nominated - ACS Award for Best Actress (2019); Nominated - ACS Award for Best Actress (2021); Nominated - Globe de Cristal Award for Best Actress - Television Series or Mini-Series (2020)
2019	Victor et Célia	Célia	Pierre Jolivet	
2020	Terrible jungle	Albertine	Hugo Benamozig & David Caviglioli	
2021	Hommes au bord de la crise de nerfs	Isis	Audrey Dana	
2022	Le Nouveau Jouet	Alice	James Huth	
