= Natalia Doco =

Argentine-French singer

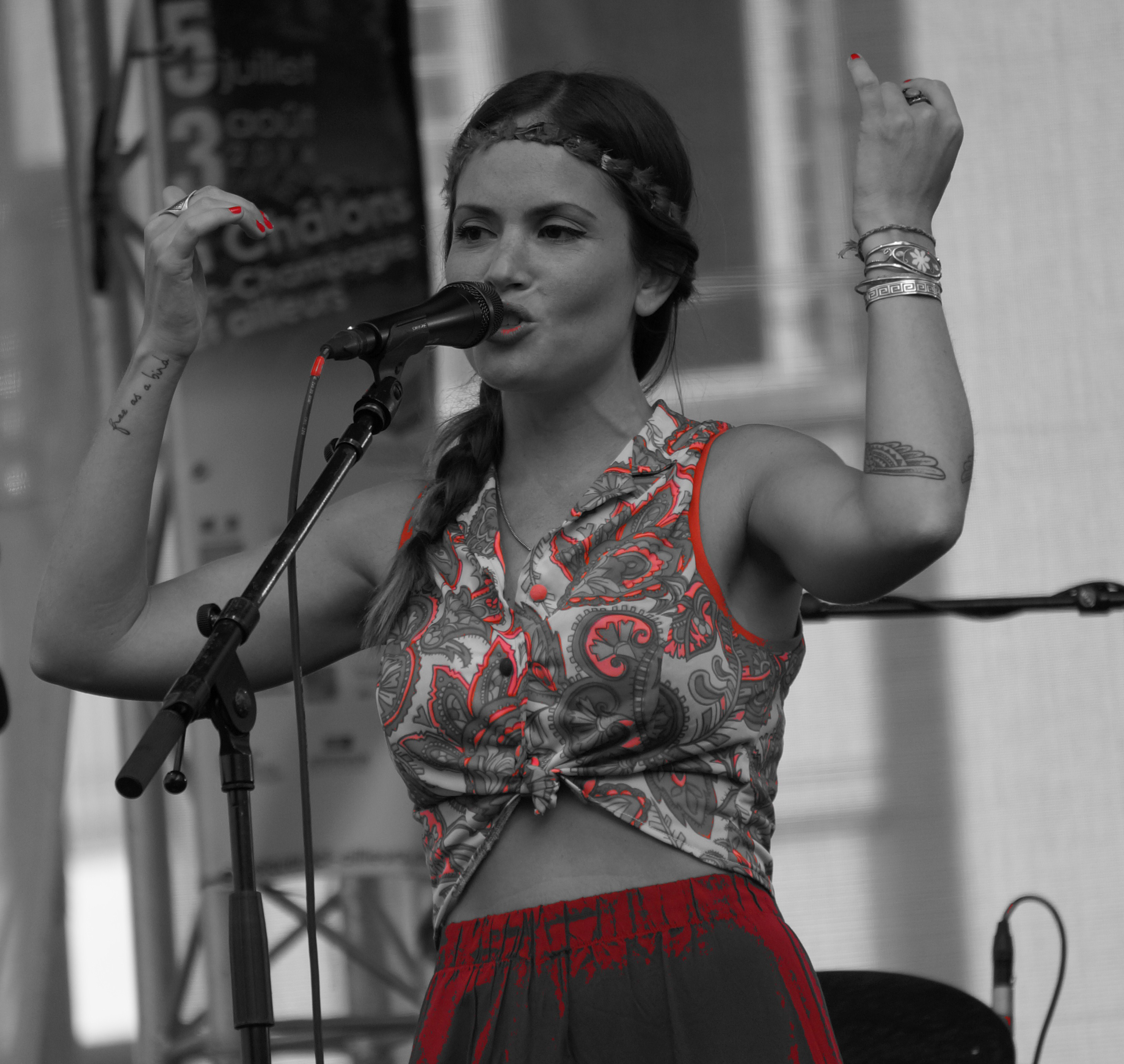
- Natalia Doco performing at the Festival Musiques d'ici et d'ailleurs in Châlons-en-Champagne in 2014
- Born: Natalia Marina Collado; 2 September 1982 (age 43); Buenos Aires, Argentina
- Occupations: Singer; songwriter
- Partner: Florian Delavega
- Children: 1

Natalia Doco (born 6 September 1982, Buenos Aires, Argentina) is an Argentine singer and musician currently based in France.

== Life ==
Natalia Doco was born in Buenos Aires on 6 September 1982.

She began to make herself known by performing and singing in bars. In 2004, Natalia Doco was a candidate on the program Operación Triunfo, the Argentine version of Star Academy. Due to little success and a bad experience on the show, she left for several years in Mexico (five or six years) to step back and learn the profession of singer, performing traditional and popular songs in clubs and festivals.

She made a trip to Europe in 2011, and decided to settle in Paris after meeting Florian Delavega, with whom she formed a relationship.

In May 2014, she released an EP, Freezing, then in June her first album, Mucho Chino. Sung in Spanish and English, this album includes three covers: Et Pourtant by Charles Aznavour, And I Love Her by the Beatles and La Celestina by Lhasa de Sela. Her single Respira was released in June 2015. She performed as the warm up act for several artists, including Gilberto Gil.

Also in 2014, Imany used her as one of the voices of the soundtrack of Audrey Dana's film Under the skirts of girls. Imany then invited her to participate in concerts organized for the fight against endometriosis in 2015, and 2016.

In spite of some success, she thought that her first album does not reflect her style enough, and created her own label alongside her manager and her companion. For her new project, she contacted Argentinian musician Axel Krygier. After a remote collaboration, Natalia Doco leaves to record her second album, in Argentina in October 2015. Entitled El Buen Gualicho, sung in Spanish and French, this album was released in September 2017. El Buen Gualicho received in particular positive reviews in Le Monde and Madmoizelle. Announcing the release of this album on Instagram, she also publicly revealed her pregnancy. In January 2018, Natalia announced she had given birth to a boy.

== Discography ==
Albums

- 2014 : Mucho Chino (Belleville Music)
- 2017 : El Buen Gualicho (Casa Del Árbol)
- 2023 : La Sagrada (Casa Del Árbol)

Single and EP

- 2014 : Freezing
- 2015 : Respira

Participation

- 2014 : Sous les jupes des filles (bande originale)

== Awards ==
- Prix Talents W9 2015 : nomination
