= Claire Darling =

2018 film

- La Dernière Folie de Claire Darling
- Directed by: Julie Bertuccelli
- Written by: Julie Bertuccelli; Marion Doussot; Mariette Désert; Sophie Fillières; Lynda Rutledge
- Based on: Faith Bass Darling’s Last Garage Sale by Lynda Rutledge
- Produced by: Yael Fogiel; Laetitia Gonzalez
- Starring: Catherine Deneuve; Chiara Mastroianni; Alice Taglioni
- Cinematography: Irina Lubtchansky
- Edited by: François Gédigier
- Production companies: Les Films du Poisson; France 2 Cinéma; Pictanovo; Région Hauts-de-France; Uccelli Production; Centre National de la Cinématographie (CNC); Région Ile-de-France; Canal+ Ciné+ France Télévisions; Cofinova 14; SofiTVciné 5 Cinécap; Cinémage 12
- Distributed by: Pyramide Distribution
- Release dates: 19 October 2018 (Chicago International Film Festival); 2 June 2019 (France)
- Running time: 94 minutes
- Country: France
- Language: French
- Budget: $5.6 million
- Box office: $1 million

Claire Darling (French: La Dernière Folie de Claire Darling) is a 2018 French drama film directed by Julie Bertuccelli. This is the adaptation of Lynda Rutledge's novel Faith Bass Darling’s Last Garage Sale.

== Plot ==
In Verderonne, a small village in the Oise, it is the first day of summer and Claire Darling wakes up persuaded to live her last day. She then decides to empty her house and sells everything without distinction, Tiffany lamps with the pendulum collection. Her daughter, Marie, also comes back after 20 years.

== Cast ==
- Catherine Deneuve - Claire Darling
  - Alice Taglioni - Young Claire Darling
- Chiara Mastroianni - Marie Darling
- Samir Guesmi - Amir
- Laure Calamy - Martine Leroy
- Olivier Rabourdin - Claude Darling
- Johan Leysen - Father Georges
- Anne Benoît - Madame Hiram

== Production ==
The film was shot in the village of Verderonne in northern France.

== Response ==
=== Box office ===
Claire Darling grossed $0 in North America and a total worldwide of $1 million. With 85,000 spectators in France, the film is a heavy public failure.

=== Critical reception ===
On review aggregator website Rotten Tomatoes, the film holds an approval rating of 93%, based on 14 reviews, and an average rating of 6.3/10. On AlloCiné, the film has a score of 3 out of 5. Télérama gives 4 stars to this documentary and compliments Catherine Deneuve: "unfathomable, reign on this tale." Didier Péron de Libération found in contrast that "the film, or the filmmaker [...] draws no interesting part of the nature of the game Deneuve". CineSeries is mixed but leaves a positive opinion: "a moving portrait of a courageous woman and imperfect mother."
