= French Women (film) =

- Theatrical release poster
- French: Sous les jupes des filles
- Literally: Under the Skirts of Girls
- Directed by: Audrey Dana
- Written by: Audrey Dana; Raphaëlle Desplechin; Murielle Magellan
- Produced by: Olivier Delbosc; Marc Missonnier
- Starring: Isabelle Adjani; Alice Belaïdi; Laetitia Casta; Audrey Dana; Julie Ferrier; Audrey Fleurot; Marina Hands; Géraldine Nakache; Vanessa Paradis; Alice Taglioni; Sylvie Testud
- Cinematography: Giovanni Fiore Coltellacci
- Edited by: Hervé de Luze; Julien Leloup
- Music by: Imany
- Production companies: Fidélité Films; Wild Bunch; M6 Films
- Distributed by: Wild Bunch
- Release date: 4 June 2014
- Running time: 116 minutes
- Country: France
- Language: French
- Budget: $7.8 million
- Box office: $13.1 million

French Women (French: Sous les jupes des filles, lit. 'Under the Skirts of Girls') is a 2014 French comedy drama film and the directorial debut of Audrey Dana. The film tells the stories of eleven women in Paris and features an ensemble cast including Isabelle Adjani, Alice Belaïdi, Laetitia Casta, Audrey Dana, Julie Ferrier, Audrey Fleurot, Marina Hands, Géraldine Nakache, Vanessa Paradis, Alice Taglioni and Sylvie Testud.

== Plot ==
Story of 11 middle-aged women of different backgrounds find their lively distaff side within and outside the bonds of marriage, work and family life. The story is told through a prism of infidelity, insecurity, neurosis, boredom, frustration, menopause ...etc.

== Cast ==
- Isabelle Adjani as Lili
- Alice Belaïdi as Adeline
- Laetitia Casta as Agathe
- Audrey Dana as Jo
- Julie Ferrier as Fanny
- Audrey Fleurot as Sophie
- Marina Hands as Inès
- Géraldine Nakache as Ysis
- Vanessa Paradis as Rose
- Alice Taglioni as Marie
- Sylvie Testud as Sam
- Laure Calamy as Cathy Bento
- Stanley Weber as James Gordon
- Alex Lutz as Jacques, Inès's husband
- Guillaume Gouix as Ysis's husband

== Soundtrack ==
1. "The Seasons Lost Their Jazz" - Natalia Doco - 3:13
2. "The Good the Bad & the Crazy" - Imany - 2:48
3. "Try Again" (Theme) - Imany - 1:00
4. "Don't Be So Shy" - Sherika Sherard - 3:17
5. "Dropped Down" - Emilie Gassin - 3:10
6. "The Seasons Lost Their Jazz" (Theme) - Imany - 1:42
7. "Sitting on the Ground" - Axelle Rousseau - 3:16
8. "Try Again" - Imany, Emilie Gassin, Natalia Doco, Axelle Rousseau & Sherika Sherard - 3:19
9. "Don't Be so Shy" (Work in Progress) - Imany - 3:02
10. "The Good the Bad & the Crazy" (Jazz Theme) - Imany - 2:02
11. "The Seasons Lost Their Jazz" (Choral Version) - Imany, Natalia Doco, Axelle Rousseau & Sherika Sherard - 3:13
12. "The Good the Bad & the Crazy" (Movie Version) - Imany - 3:52
