= Julie Ferrier =

French actress, comedian, dancer and director

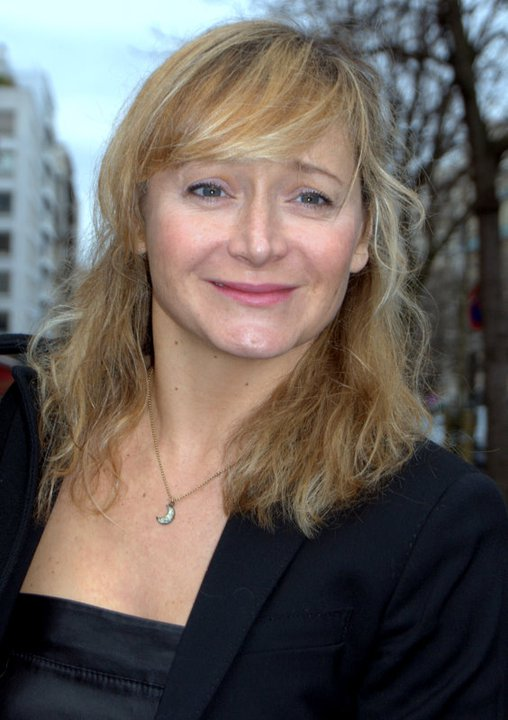
- Julie Ferrier in 2011
- Born: 5 December 1971 (age 54); Courbevoie, France
- Occupations: Actress, comedian

Julie Ferrier (born 5 December 1971) is a French actress, comedian, dancer, writer and theater director.

== Early life ==
Ferrier is in the eighth generation of actresses on the maternal side of her family. She was raised in a difficult housing project in the Seine-Saint-Denis town of Noisy Le Grand. In 1988, she entered the Conservatoire de Paris, then attended the circus school Académie Fratellini. She was first interested in dance, in which field she worked professionally for ten years, for choreographers such as Philippe Decouflé – she danced at the opening ceremony of the 1992 Winter Olympics at Albertville – and was a colleague of Kamel Ouali.

From 1996 to 1998 she took classes at L'École Internationale de Théâtre Jacques Lecoq, directed by Alain Mollot.

== Career ==
In 2001, she was in the Théâtre de la Jacquerie directed by Alain Mollot.

In 2004, she played Today is Ferrier in a mise en scène by Isabelle Nanty.

In 2006, her one-woman show Today is Ferrier was a public and critical success.

In 2007 she voiced the television animation Moot-Moot and put out the DVD of Today is Ferrier.

In 2008 she was the leading actress in Mademoiselle broadcast on France 2. This was the French adaptation of the German series Ladykracher based on absurd situations in the daily lives of women. She has also been on the posters of eight films.

In 2009 she was on the jury for the festival of short fantasy films Fantastic'Arts.

== Filmography ==
Year	Title	Role	Director	Notes
2006	Madame Irma	The seer	Didier Bourdon & Yves Fajnberg	
2006	Bataille natale	Valéry	Anne Deluz	TV movie
2007	Mr. Bean's Holiday	First AD	Steve Bendelack	
2008	Paris	Caroline	Cédric Klapisch	
2008	Notre univers impitoyable	Éléonore	Léa Fazer	
2008	15 ans et demi	Fiona	François Desagnat & Thomas Sorriaux	
2008	Agathe Cléry	The cop	Étienne Chatiliez	
2008	A Day at the Museum	The prospect guide	Jean-Michel Ribes	
2008	Ça se soigne?	Adrienne Bledish	Laurent Chouchan	
2008	Didine	Muriel	Vincent Dietschy	
2008	Un château en Espagne	The new neighbor	Isabelle Doval	
2009	Micmacs	Elastic Girl	Jean-Pierre Jeunet	
2010	Heartbreaker	Mélanie	Pascal Chaumeil	Nominated – César Award for Best Supporting Actress
2010	On Tour	Herself	Mathieu Amalric	
2010	Un divorce de chien	Lou	Lorraine Lévy	TV movie
2010	Le pas Petit Poucet	Maman Légère	Christophe Campos	TV movie
2011	A Monster in Paris	Madame Carlotta	Bibo Bergeron	
2011	De l'huile sur le feu	The cop	Nicolas Benamou	
2011	Chez Maupassant	Céleste Luneau	Philippe Bérenger	TV series (1 episode)
2012	Sea, No Sex & Sun	Justine	Christophe Turpin	
2012	Le fil d'Ariane	Ariane	Marion Laine	TV movie
2013	For a Woman	Tania	Diane Kurys	
2013	The Stroller Strategy	Valérie	Clément Michel	
2013	À votre bon coeur Mesdames	Pauline	Jean-Pierre Mocky	
2013	La fleur de l'âge	Zana Kotnic	Nick Quinn	
2013	Blanche nuit	Mrs. Klimt	Fabrice Sébille	
2013	La vie domestique	Betty	Isabelle Czajka	
2013	Clownwise	Fabienne	Viktor Taus	
2014	French Women	Fanny	Audrey Dana	
2014	Never on the First Night	Rose	Melissa Drigeard	
2014	Lou! Journal infime	Sophie	Julien Neel	
2014	La liste de mes envies	The psychologist	Didier Le Pêcheur	
2014	Bouboule	Brigitte Trichon	Bruno Deville	
2014	Le sang de la vigne	Sybille	Aruna Villiers	TV series (1 episode) du raffut à Saint Vivant
2015	The Night Watchman	Jeanne	Pierre Jolivet	
2015	Lettre à France	France	Stéphane Clavier	TV movie
2016	Puerto Ricans in Paris	Francesca	Ian Edelman	
2016	Père fils thérapie !	Gilberte Ménard	Émile Gaudreault	
2016	Les naufragés	Charlie	David Charhon	
2016	Deux escargots s'en vont	Voice	Jean-Pierre Jeunet & Romain Segaud	Short
2017	Everyone's Life	Nathalie Richer / Judith	Claude Lelouch	
2017	Les mystères de l'île	Solène	François Guérin	TV movie
2018	J'ai perdu Albert	Chloé	Didier Van Cauwelaert	
2018	Le Flic de Belleville	The consul	Rachid Bouchareb	
2018	La révolte des innocents	Joséphine Poliveau	Philippe Niang	TV movie

== Theatre ==
Year	Title	Author	Director	Theater
1992	Barnum	Mark Bramble, Michael Stewart & Cy Coleman	Jean-Paul Lucet	Théâtre des Célestins
1992	Kiss me Kate	Bella and Samuel Spewack & Cole Porter	Alain Marcel	Grand Théâtre de Genève; Théâtre Mogador
2004–2008	Aujourd'hui c'est Ferrier	Julie Ferrier	Isabelle Nanty	Théâtre de la Gaîté-Montparnasse; Casino de Paris
2014	En Mai c'est FERRIER ah la Gaîté !	Julie Ferrier	Julie Ferrier	Théâtre de la Gaîté-Montparnasse
