= Notre univers impitoyable =

- Film poster
- Directed by: Léa Fazer
- Written by: Léa Fazer
- Produced by: Carole Scotta; Caroline Benjo
- Starring: Alice Taglioni; Jocelyn Quivrin; Thierry Lhermitte
- Cinematography: Myriam Vinocour
- Edited by: François Gédigier
- Music by: Sébastien Schuller
- Production companies: Haut et Court; M6 Films
- Distributed by: Haut et Court
- Release dates: 16 January 2008 (Alpe d'Huez); 13 February 2008 (France)
- Running time: 87 minutes
- Country: France
- Language: French
- Budget: $4.5 million
- Box office: $1.4 million

Notre univers impitoyable (English title: What If...?) is a 2008 French film written and directed by Léa Fazer. The film stars Alice Taglioni, Jocelyn Quivrin, Thierry Lhermitte, Pascale Arbillot, Julie Ferrier and Scali Delpeyrat. The soundtrack was composed by Sébastien Schuller.

== Cast ==
- Alice Taglioni as Margot Dittermann
- Jocelyn Quivrin as Victor Bandini
- Thierry Lhermitte as Nicolas Bervesier
- Pascale Arbillot as Juliette
- Scali Delpeyrat as Bertrand Lavoisier
- Julie Ferrier as Éléonore
- Eliot Pasqualon as Antonin
- Denise Aron-Schropfer as Margot's mother
- Antonio Cauchois as Margot's father
- Léa Fazer as the jeweler
- Joe Sheridan as Goudal
