= If I Were a Boy (film) =

- Directed by: Audrey Dana
- Written by: Audrey Dana; Maud Ameline
- Starring: Audrey Dana; Christian Clavier; Éric Elmosnino; Alice Belaïdi; Joséphine Draï
- Production companies: Fidélité Films; Curiosa Films; Moana Films
- Release date: 2017
- Running time: 95 minutes
- Country: France
- Language: French
- Box office: $1,162,912

If I Were a Boy (French: Si j'étais un homme) is a 2017 film directed by Audrey Dana and starring Audrey Dana, Christian Clavier, Éric Elmosnino, Alice Belaïdi and Joséphine Draï. The film is about a woman who grows a penis.

== Synopsis ==
Dumped by her husband who wants to start a new life with another woman, Jeanne, 38 and mother of two children, decides to no longer live with a man. While she wakes up at dawn to go to the toilet, she does her business standing up without realizing it until she goes back to bed and discovers that she has a penis. Between fits of laughter with her friend Marcelle and panic attacks at her gynecologist, Jeanne tries as best she can to live with this new situation. But things get more complicated when her colleague Merlin falls in love with her.

== Cast ==
- Audrey Dana : Jeanne
- Christian Clavier : Dr. Pace
- Éric Elmosnino : Merlin
- Alice Belaïdi : Marcelle
- Joséphine Draï : Joe
- Victoire Brunelle-Remy : Lou
- Antoine Gouy : Anton
- Lee El Mechri : Paul
- Jézabel Marques : Cécile
- Johanne Toledano : la secrétaire du docteur
- Guillaume Delaunay : Monsieur Kracovik
- Jérôme Paquatte : le chef des ouvriers
- Jérôme Pouly : le patron
- Bertrand Usclat : un collègue
- Johann Cuny : un collègue
- Gilles Lemaire : Adam
- Katia Hunsinger : Sidonie

== Reception ==
The film was critically panned and flopped at the box office.
