= Don't Be So Shy =

2015 single by Imany

Single by Imany

from the album The Wrong Kind of War
- Released: 18 September 2015
- Genre: Deep house
- Length: 3:10
- Songwriters: Nadia Mladjao; Stéfane Goldman

Imany singles chronology
"The Good the Bad & the Crazy" (2014)	"Don't Be So Shy" (2015)	"There Were Tears" (2016)

"Don't Be So Shy" is a song by French singer Imany. The song was written by Imany and music by Nadia Mladjao (Imany) and Stéfane Goldman. A remixed version by Filatov & Karas became a pan-European and international hit for Imany and her biggest hit.

It was used in the soundtrack of the 2014 film Sous les jupes des filles (also known by the English title French Women), where two versions are used, one by Sherika Sherard and the other by Imany dubbed "Don't Be so Shy (Work in Progress)".

== Filatov & Karas remix ==
In August 2015, the song was remixed by the Russian DJ duo Filatov & Karas. This version became a hit across Europe, topping the charts in Slovenia, Russia, Poland, France, Germany and Austria and charting highly on other European singles charts.

This version later appeared on Imany's album The Wrong Kind of War, released on 26 August 2016.

== Don't Be So Shy Remixes ==
Imany also released a separate EP of remixes of the song.

=== Track listing ===
1. "Don't Be So Shy" (Filatov & Karas Remix) – 3:10
2. "Don't Be So Shy" (Ruslan Nigmatullin Remix) – 3:46
3. "Don't Be So Shy" (Work in Progress)" – 3:02

== Charts ==
=== Weekly charts ===
2015–2017 weekly chart performance for "Don't Be So Shy" (Filatov & Karas Remix)
Chart (2015–2017)	Peak position
Australia (ARIA)	9
Austria (Ö3 Austria Top 40)	1
Belarus Airplay (Eurofest)	50
Belgium (Ultratop 50 Flanders)	5
Belgium (Ultratop 50 Wallonia)	3
Bulgaria Airplay (PROPHON)	1
Canada Hot 100 (Billboard)	94
CIS Airplay (TopHit)	1
Czech Republic Airplay (ČNS IFPI)	20
Denmark (Tracklisten)	16
Finland (Suomen virallinen lista)	5
France (SNEP)	1
Germany (GfK)	1
Greece Digital (Billboard)	1
Hungary (Dance Top 40)	1
Hungary (Rádiós Top 40)	2
Hungary (Single Top 40)	2
Italy (FIMI)	22
Lebanon (Lebanese Top 20)	6
Netherlands (Dutch Top 40)	7
Netherlands (Global Top 40)	21
Netherlands (Single Top 100)	17
Norway (VG-lista)	17
Poland Airplay (ZPAV)	1
Poland Dance (ZPAV)	1
Portugal (AFP)	97
Romania (Airplay 100)	1
Romania TV Airplay (Media Forest)	1
Russia Airplay (TopHit)	1
Slovakia Airplay (ČNS IFPI)	1
Slovakia Singles Digital (ČNS IFPI)	11
Slovenia Airplay (SloTop50)	1
Spain (Promusicae)	6
Sweden (Sverigetopplistan)	10
Switzerland (Schweizer Hitparade)	3
Switzerland (Media Control Romandy)	1
Turkey International Airplay (MusicTopTR)	1
Ukraine Airplay (TopHit)	1

2018 weekly chart performance for "Don't Be So Shy" (Filatov & Karas Remix)
Chart (2018)	Peak position
Ukraine Airplay (TopHit)	192

2019 weekly chart performance for "Don't Be So Shy" (Filatov & Karas Remix)
Chart (2019)	Peak position
CIS Airplay (TopHit)	178
Ukraine Airplay (TopHit)	31

2020 weekly chart performance for "Don't Be So Shy" (Filatov & Karas Remix)
Chart (2020)	Peak position
Finland Airplay (Radiosoittolista)	59
Ukraine Airplay (TopHit)	103

2021 weekly chart performance for "Don't Be So Shy" (Filatov & Karas Remix)
Chart (2021)	Peak position
Finland Airplay (Radiosoittolista)	78

2023 Weekly chart performance for "Don't Be So Shy" (Filatov & Karas Remix)
Chart (2023)	Peak position
Belarus Airplay (TopHit)	157
Kazakhstan Airplay (TopHit)	83
Moldova Airplay (TopHit)	200
Romania Airplay (TopHit)	80

2024 Weekly chart performance for "Don't Be So Shy" (Filatov & Karas Remix)
Chart (2024)	Peak position
Estonia Airplay (TopHit)	83
Kazakhstan Airplay (TopHit)	26
Moldova Airplay (TopHit)	95
Romania Airplay (TopHit)	105

2025 Weekly chart performance for "Don't Be So Shy" (Filatov & Karas Remix)
Chart (2025)	Peak position
Belarus Airplay (TopHit)	187
Estonia Airplay (TopHit)	159
Finland Airplay (Radiosoittolista)	97
Kazakhstan Airplay (TopHit)	76
Romania Airplay (TopHit)	83

2026 weekly chart performance for "Don't Be So Shy" (Filatov & Karas Remix)
Chart (2026)	Peak position
Finland Airplay (Radiosoittolista)	82
Kazakhstan Airplay (TopHit)	78
Poland (Polish Airplay Top 100)	43
Romania Airplay (TopHit)	94

=== Monthly charts ===
2015 monthly chart performance for "Don't Be So Shy" (Filatov & Karas Remix)
Chart (2015)	Peak position
CIS Airplay (TopHit)	1
Russia Airplay (TopHit)	1
Ukraine Airplay (TopHit)	3

2016 monthly chart performance for "Don't Be So Shy" (Filatov & Karas Remix)
Chart (2016)	Peak position
CIS Airplay (TopHit)	1
Russia Airplay (TopHit)	1
Ukraine Airplay (TopHit)	1

2017 monthly chart performance for "Don't Be So Shy" (Filatov & Karas Remix)
Chart (2017)	Peak position
Ukraine Airplay (TopHit)	39

2019 monthly chart performance for "Don't Be So Shy" (Filatov & Karas Remix)
Chart (2019)	Peak position
Ukraine Airplay (TopHit)	62

2023 monthly chart performance for "Don't Be So Shy" (Filatov & Karas Remix)
Chart (2023)	Peak position
Romania Airplay (TopHit)	96

2024 monthly chart performance for "Don't Be So Shy" (Filatov & Karas Remix)
Chart (2024)	Peak position
Kazakhstan Airplay (TopHit)	33

2025 monthly chart performance for "Don't Be So Shy" (Filatov & Karas Remix)
Chart (2025)	Peak position
Kazakhstan Airplay (TopHit)	88
Romania Airplay (TopHit)	95

=== Year-end charts ===
2015 year-end chart performance for "Don't Be So Shy" (Filatov & Karas Remix)
Chart (2015)	Position
CIS Airplay (TopHit)	27
Russia Airplay (TopHit)	28
Ukraine Airplay (TopHit)	49

2016 year-end chart performance for "Don't Be So Shy" (Filatov & Karas Remix)
Chart (2016)	Position
Australia (ARIA)	83
Austria (Ö3 Austria Top 40)	6
Belgium (Ultratop Flanders)	26
Belgium (Ultratop Wallonia)	8
CIS Airplay (TopHit)	3
Denmark (Tracklisten)	76
France (SNEP)	10
Germany (Official German Charts)	4
Hungary (Dance Top 40)	2
Hungary (Rádiós Top 40)	7
Hungary (Single Top 40)	2
Iceland (Plötutíóindi)	46
Italy (FIMI)	46
Israel International Airplay (Media Forest)	21
Netherlands (Dutch Top 40)	41
Poland (ZPAV)	6
Romania (Airplay 100)	1
Russia Airplay (TopHit)	9
Slovenia Airplay (SloTop50)	14
Sweden (Sverigetopplistan)	64
Switzerland (Schweizer Hitparade)	10
Ukraine Airplay (TopHit)	4

2017 year-end chart performance for "Don't Be So Shy" (Filatov & Karas Remix)
Chart (2017)	Position
CIS Airplay (TopHit)	164
France (SNEP)	174
Hungary (Dance Top 40)	13
Hungary (Rádiós Top 40)	7
Hungary (Single Top 40)	35
Slovenia Airplay (SloTop50)	29
Ukraine Airplay (TopHit)	51

2022 year-end chart performance for "Don't Be So Shy" (Filatov & Karas Remix)
Chart (2022)	Position
Hungary (Rádiós Top 40)	58

2023 year-end chart performance for "Don't Be So Shy" (Filatov & Karas Remix)
Chart (2023)	Position
Hungary (Rádiós Top 40)	75
Kazakhstan Airplay (TopHit)	128
Romania Airplay (TopHit)	157

2024 year-end chart performance for "Don't Be So Shy" (Filatov & Karas Remix)
Chart (2024)	Position
Hungary (Rádiós Top 40)	77
Kazakhstan Airplay (TopHit)	48
Poland (Polish Airplay Top 100)	94

2025 year-end chart performance for "Don't Be So Shy" (Filatov & Karas Remix)
Chart (2025)	Position
Kazakhstan Airplay (TopHit)	77
Poland (Polish Airplay Top 100)	85
Romania Airplay (TopHit)	174

=== Decade-end charts ===
10s Decade-end chart performance for "Don't Be So Shy" (Filatov & Karas Remix)
Chart (2010–2019)	Position
CIS Airplay (TopHit)	5
Russia Airplay (TopHit)	13
Ukraine Airplay (TopHit)	18

20s Decade-end chart performance for "Don't Be So Shy" (Filatov & Karas Remix)
Chart (2020–2025)	Position
Belarus Airplay (TopHit)	192
Kazakhstan Airplay (TopHit)	133
Romania Airplay (TopHit)	141

== Certifications ==
Certifications for "Don't Be So Shy"
Region	Certification	Certified units/sales
Australia (ARIA)	Platinum	70,000^{‡}
Austria (IFPI Austria)	Gold	15,000^{‡}
Belgium (BRMA)	Platinum	20,000^{‡}
Canada (Music Canada)	Platinum	80,000^{‡}
Denmark (IFPI Danmark)	2× Platinum	180,000^{‡}
France (SNEP)	Diamond	233,333^{‡}
Germany (BVMI)	Diamond	1,000,000^{‡}
Italy (FIMI)	3× Platinum	150,000^{‡}
Norway (IFPI Norway)	Platinum	40,000^{‡}
Poland (ZPAV)	Diamond	100,000^{‡}
Spain (Promusicae)	Gold	30,000^{‡}
Sweden (GLF)	Platinum	40,000^{‡}
Switzerland (IFPI Switzerland)	2× Platinum	60,000^{‡}
United Kingdom (BPI)	Silver	200,000^{‡}
^{‡} Sales+streaming figures based on certification alone.

== See also ==
- List of Airplay 100 number ones of the 2010s
