= Puerto Ricans in Paris =

2015 American comedy film

- Theatrical release poster
- Directed by: Ian Edelman
- Written by: Neel Shah; Ian Edelman
- Produced by: Joseph Zolfo
- Starring: Luis Guzmán; Edgar Garcia; Alice Taglioni; Miriam Shor; Frédéric Anscombre; Rosario Dawson; Rosie Perez
- Cinematography: Damian Acevedo
- Edited by: Justin Krohn
- Music by: Jonathan Sadoff
- Production company: PRIP Productions
- Distributed by: Focus World
- Release dates: June 12, 2015 (Los Angeles Film Festival); June 10, 2016 (United States)
- Running time: 81 minutes
- Country: United States
- Language: English
- Box office: $102,890

Puerto Ricans in Paris is a 2015 American comedy film directed by Ian Edelman and written by Neel Shah and Ian Edelman. The film stars Luis Guzmán, Edgar Garcia, Alice Taglioni, Miriam Shor, Frédéric Anscombre, Rosario Dawson and Rosie Perez. The film was released on June 10, 2016, by Focus World.

== Plot ==
Luis and Eddie are police detectives and long-time partners. Eddie is married to Luis's sister Gloria and struggles to support their family. He yearns to give Gloria a better life. Meanwhile, Luis has been with his girlfriend Vanessa for a long time, but constantly flirts with other women.

One day the two are visited by Colette, a famous Parisian fashion designer, and Vincent, one of her executives. One of Colette's purse designs has been stolen and held for a high ransom. She believes the French police won't act in time to recover it, so she has traveled to New York City to hire NYPD detectives, whom she feels would do better. The two Puerto Rican detectives go to Paris to find the prototype for the designs.

Upon arriving in Paris, the two detectives don various disguises to interview the various suspects, offering each of them large bribes for the stolen bag. One by one, all of the suspects turn out to be innocent. Meanwhile, Luis, unsuccessful at finding someone to sleep with in Paris, accuses Eddie of cheating on Gloria with Colette. The two fight after a night of heavy partying and agree to end their partnership. Luis goes to the corporate offices and informs Vincent that Colette stole her own design to get the ransom. As he leaves, he steals a pair of sunglasses from Vincent's desk.

Vincent goes to Colette's studio and informs her that her company has fired her for incompetence. She intercepts Luis and Eddie on their way to the airport and asks for their help. Seeing the sunglasses, she realizes that Vincent was behind the theft. She takes the two detectives to her corporate office, where the board is meeting with Vincent to discuss producing cheap merchandise with Colette's name on it. Eddie realizes where the bag is hidden, and Colette is vindicated. Eddie has also proven that he is at least Luis’ equal.

The two detectives return to New York. Eddie surprises Gloria with a gift she loves. Luis, realizing he belongs with Vanessa, proposes to her with a large engagement ring.

== Cast ==
- Luis Guzmán as Luis
- Edgar Garcia as Eddie
- Alice Taglioni as Colette
- Miriam Shor as Sergeant Nora
- Frédéric Anscombre as Vincent
- Rosario Dawson as Vanessa
- Rosie Perez as Gloria
- Ravi Patel as Hassan
- Jessica Boone as Vincent's Secretary
- Paulina Singer as Lexi
- Charlotte Mangel as Ludivine
- Julie Ferrier as Francesca
- Lilou Fogli as Kate
- Michaël Cohen as Jerome
- Brian Tyree Henry as Spencer
- Xavier Dumont as Daniel

== Release ==
The film premiered at the Los Angeles Film Festival on June 12, 2015. The film was released on June 10, 2016, by Focus World.

== Reception ==
Puerto Ricans in Paris received mixed reviews from critics. As of June 2020, the film holds a 36% approval rating on Rotten Tomatoes, based on 22 reviews with an average rating of 4.5/10. On Metacritic, the film has a score of 47 out of 100, based on 12 critics, indicating "mixed or average reviews".
