= J'ai perdu Albert =

- Directed by: Didier Van Cauwelaert
- Written by: Didier Van Cauwelaert
- Produced by: Virginie Visconti
- Starring: Stéphane Plaza; Julie Ferrier; Josiane Balasko; Virginie Visconti; Bernard Le Coq
- Cinematography: Michel Amathieu
- Edited by: Sylvie Gadmer
- Music by: Michel Legrand
- Production companies: Angélus Productions; Climax Films
- Distributed by: StudioCanal
- Release date: 12 September 2018
- Country: France
- Language: French
- Box office: $373.000

J'ai perdu Albert (lit. 'I lost Albert') is a French comedy directed and written by Didier Van Cauwelaert. It is the final film composed by Michel Legrand before his death in 2019.

== Plot ==
Chloe, a young medium that the great business leaders, politicians and the jet set snapped up, shelters in her since childhood the spirit of Albert Einstein. Overworked, the information does not "pass" anymore. So Albert decides to move ... For better or for worse, he settles in Zac, a depressive Cartesian, beekeeper routed and waiter. Become inseparable and complementary, because one has the "genius" and the other his instructions, Zac and Chloe, these two beings who are dissimilar in everything, will live in 48 hours the most hallucinating "households for three" ...

== Cast ==
- Stéphane Plaza: Zac
- Julie Ferrier: Chloé
- Josiane Balasko: Madame Le Couidec
- Bernard Le Coq: Georges
- Virginie Visconti: Nelly
- Etienne Draber: Albert Einstein
- Philippe du Janerand: Roland Buech
- Jean-Noël Cnokaert: Olivier
- Alex Vizorek: Damien
- Patrick Préjean: The priest
- Denis Mpunga: Général Beck
- Daniel Benoin: Surgeon Moulin
- Michael Cambier: Guillaume

== Production ==
Principal photography on the film October 2017 in Nice.
