= Jessica Boone =

American actress

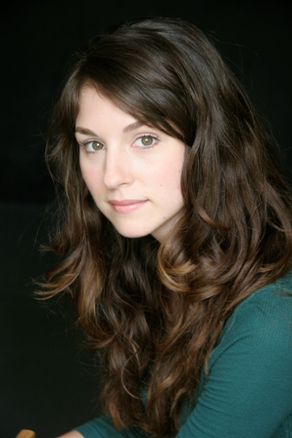
- Born: Texas, U.S.
- Occupation: Actress
- Years active: 1992–present
- Website: www.jessicaboone.net

Jessica Boone is an American actress. Her earlier career while she lived in Houston involved work primarily for Japanese anime series and video games. She has since focused more on theatre work, including both Shakespeare and musical theatre.

== Career ==
Boone has been a leading player with the Houston Shakespeare Festival, and is co-CEO and an associate artist for Prague Shakespeare Company, the Czech Republic's professional English-language theater, where her roles have included Rosalind, Juliet, Helena, Regan, Ophelia, Innogen, and Lady Macbeth. Boone is also an accomplished voice actress, known throughout the anime world for her work voicing hundreds of characters in Japanese animated series such as Mimmy in Hello Kitty, Misaki Suzuhara in Angelic Layer, Chiyo Mihama in Azumanga Daioh, Fuki in Mushishi from Episode 19, and Sheele in Akame ga Kill. Her film and TV work includes feature films Unlocked directed by Michael Apted, starring Michael Douglas, Orlando Bloom, Noomi Rapace, and John Malkovich and Puerto Ricans in Paris starring Rosario Dawson, Rosie Perez, and Luis Guzman.

Boone also appeared on Disney-ABC Television Group as Rabia in Missing starring Ashley Judd, Sean Bean, and Cliff Curtis.

She currently lives in Prague, Czech Republic, and has occasionally returned to the Houston area.

== Filmography ==
=== Live action ===
- Spectrauma (2011) – Isabelle
- Missing (2012) – Rabia
- Meet the Engineer (2012 web series for Škoda Auto) – Sophie
- Puerto Ricans in Paris – Vincent's Secretary (2015)
- Unlocked – Romley's Assistant (2016)
- The Wheel of Time (2023) - Alwhin

=== Anime ===
- Air Gear – Ine Makigami, Ishiwatari
- Akame ga Kill! - Sheele
- All Purpose Cultural Cat Girl Nuku Nuku – Chieko, Yoshimi (OVA) (Debut role)
- Angel Beats! – Hisako, Hatsune Otonashi
- Angelic Layer – Misaki Suzuhara
- Another – Izumi Akazawa
- Azumanga Daioh – Chiyo Mihama
- Best Student Council – Kotoha Kutsugi, Yuko Kimizuka
- The Book of Bantorra – Lully, Yuri
- Canaan – Liang Qi
- Le Chevalier D'Eon – Ekaterina
- Chrono Crusade – Azmaria Hendric
- Clannad After Story – Sugisaka (Ep. 13–14), Kimura (Ep. 23), Yuu's Sister (Ep. 7–8)
- Coyote Ragtime Show – October, November, December
- Cyber Team in Akihabara – Miyama Soshigaya
- D.N.Angel – Mio Hio
- Demon King Daimao – Yuri Hoshino/Yuko Hattori
- Devil Survivor 2: The Animation – Io Nitta
- Divergence Eve – Kiri Marialate
- Dusk Maiden of Amnesia – Kirie Kanoe, Yukariko Kanoe (Young, Ep. 10)
- Elfen Lied – Arakawa
- Full Metal Panic! – President's Daughter
- Full Metal Panic? Fumoffu – Mizuki Inaba
- Gantz – Masaru Kato (young), Additional Voices
- Gate - Princess Piña Co Lada
- Golgo 13 – Celia Irving (Ep. 35), Karen (Ep. 23)
- Gravion – Ena
- The Guin Saga – Queen Tonya
- Hakugei: Legend of the Moby Dick – Marie
- Hello Kitty's Animation Theater – Mimmy
- Highschool of the Dead – Rei Miyamoto
- Horizon in the Middle of Nowhere II – Thomas Shakespeare
- Innocent Venus – Sana Nobuto
- Jinki:EXTEND – Akao Hiiragi
- Kaleido Star – Julie, Sophie Oswald
- Kanon – Nayuki Minase
- Kiba – Kira
- Kurau: Phantom Memory – Christmas
- Legend of the Mistical Ninja – Yae
- Maburaho – Yuna Miyama
- Magical Shopping Arcade Abenobashi – Arumi Asahina
- Magikano – Ayumi Mamiya
- Megazone 23 Part III – Ryo
- Mezzo DSA – Kanako
- Momo: The Girl God of Death – Momo, Matsumoto's Girlfriend (Ep. 6)
- Mushishi – Fuki (Ep. 19)
- Nadesico: Prince of Darkness – Hisagon, Sayuri
- Najica Blitz Tactics – Fuyuki, Koharu
- Nanaka 6/17 – Satsuki Arashiyama
- Needless – Setsuna, Keiko
- Neo Ranga – Aya, Elina
- No Game No Life: Zero - Think Nilvalen
- Nurse Witch Komugi – Megumi Akiba
- Pani Poni Dash! – Akira Miyata
- Papuwa – Nakamura, Cocoa Queen
- PeaceMaker Kurogane – Hotaru
- The Place Promised in Our Early Days – Sayuri Sawatari
- Princess Tutu – Rue/Princess Kraehe
- Puni Puni Poemy – Mitsuki Aasu
- Red Garden – Jessica
- Rune Soldier – Gannet
- Samurai Bride – Ginsen Yagyu (credited as Circe Nightmare)
- Science Ninja Team Gatchaman – Julia (Ep. 43; ADV dub)
- Shattered Angels – Kozue Sato
- Sister Princess – Shirayuki
- Super GALS! – Rie Aihara, Minigal White, Maki Komine
- Tactics (manga) – Suzu Edogawa
- This Ugly Yet Beautiful World – Akari
- Those Who Hunt Elves – Mer-Elf, Elven Hunter #1, Pulana
- The Wallflower – Noi Kasahara
- Tokyo Magnitude 8.0 – Yamaji
- Towa no Quon – Yuriko Akatsuki
- A Tree of Palme – Popo
- UFO Ultramaiden Valkyrie – Inarba
- The World God Only Knows – Haqua
- Vinland Saga – Anne
- Xam'd Lost Memories – Kobako, Kujireika
- Xenosaga: The Animation – Mary Godwin, Shelley Godwin
- Yumeria – Kuyou Senjyou, Koneko

=== Video games ===
- Unlimited Saga – Ruby
- Dex – Dex

=== Other media ===
- Spider-Woman: Agent of S.W.O.R.D (Motion Comic) – Zhang Lee

=== Theatre ===
- Or – Lady Davenant (Main Street Theater - 2011)
- A Christmas Carol – Martha Cratchit (Alley Theatre)
- Romeo and Juliet – Juliet (Houston Shakespeare Festival - 2007)
- Cymbeline – Innogen (Houston Shakespeare Festival - 2008)
- Pericles – Thaisa (Houston Shakespeare Festival - 2009)
- A Midsummer Night's Dream – Helena (Houston Shakespeare Festival - 2010)
- King Lear – Regan (Prague Shakespeare Festival/Classical Theatre Company in Houston and Prague - 2011)
- As You Like It – Rosalind (Prague Shakespeare Festival/Krumlov Shakespeare Festival - 2011)
- As You Like It – Rosalind (Prague Shakespeare Festival/Classical Theatre Company in Houston and Prague - 2011)
- The Coast of Utopia: Salvage – Natasha (Main Street Theater - 2012)
- The Coast of Utopia: Shipwreck – Natasha (Main Street Theater - 2012)
- Richard III – Lady Anne (Prague Shakespeare Festival/Main Street Theater - April 2012 in Houston and Prague)
- Hamlet – Ophelia (Prague Shakespeare Festival - October 2012)
- Henry V – Katherine/ Boy (Prague Shakespeare Company/ Main Street Theater - 2013)
- Cymbeline – Innogen (Prague Shakespeare Company - 2013)
- Macbeth – Lady Macbeth (Prague Shakespeare Company - 2013–2014)
- Venus in Fur – Vanda (Prague Shakespeare Company - 2014)
- Into The Woods - Cinderella (Prague Shakespeare Company - 2014)
- Much Ado About Nothing - Hero (Prague Shakespeare Company - 2015)
- Twelfth Night - Viola (Prague Shakespeare Company - 2015)
- The Winter's Tale - Hermione (Prague Shakespeare Company - 2016)
- Amadeus - Constanza Weber (Prague Shakespeare Company - 2017)
- The Revolutionists - Charlotte Corday (Prague Shakespeare Company - 2017)
- An Iliad - Muse (Prague Shakespeare Company - 2018)
- Troilus and Cressida and Trojan Women - Athena (Prague Shakespeare Company - 2018)
