= Since Otar Left =

Since Otar Left (Depuis qu'Otar est parti...)
- Film poster
- Directed by: Julie Bertuccelli
- Written by: Julie Bertuccelli; Bernard Renucci
- Produced by: Yael Fogiel
- Starring: Esther Gorintin; Nino Khomasuridze; Dinara Drukarova
- Cinematography: Christophe Pollock
- Edited by: Emmanuelle Castro
- Distributed by: Haut et Court
- Release dates: 20 May 2003 (Cannes); 17 September 2003 (France)
- Running time: 103 minutes
- Countries: Georgia; France; Belgium
- Languages: Georgian; French; Russian

Since Otar Left (original French title: Depuis qu'Otar est parti...) is a 2003 film by director Julie Bertuccelli, recounting the lives of three Georgian women in modern-day Tbilisi. It focuses on the attempts of a mother and daughter, Marina and Ada, to hide the death of Marina's brother in Paris from Marina and her brother's elderly mother, Eka. The film was widely well-received, and won the coveted Critics' Week Grand Prize at the Cannes Film Festival.

== Plot ==
The three women live in a run-down apartment in one of Tbilisi's oldest neighborhoods. They endure the realities of modern Georgian life, such as frequent power blackouts and a dilapidated infrastructure. Eka remains the matriarch. She retains an often fractious relationship with her daughter, Marina, but is close to her granddaughter, Ada. However, it is her son Otar that she is most attached to.

Otar Gogebashvili, although a doctor, has recently moved to France because of newly independent Georgia's difficult economic situation. In Paris, he works illegally in construction in order to support the three women. Eka eagerly awaits Otar's regular calls and the money he sends. The generational difference is apparent: Eka loves French culture, speaks perfect French but remains a staunch supporter of Stalin, even in 2002, whereas Ada is Westernized, and longs to follow her uncle's path to the West. Marina has a degree but, due to high unemployment, sells heirlooms at the market.

Their life changes drastically when Marina receives a call from Otar's friend, Niko, who had accompanied him to France. Niko bears bad news: Otar has been killed in an accident. Eka is elderly and fragile, and Marina and Ada agree that the shock could kill her. In a similar manner to the German film, Good Bye Lenin!, released in the same year, they decide to conceal Otar's death.

In order to maintain the charade, Ada forges letters from Otar. Eka grows worried about the lack of calls and absence of money in the letters, but the pair substitute excuses and initially succeed in allaying her worries. Other complications are dealt with, and Eka remains unaware of Otar's death.

After a while, Ada grows reluctant to continue, as she feels that lying to her grandmother is taking its toll. While Ada and Marina consider telling Eka the truth, the eccentric Eka decides that she wants to visit Otar. Before they can dissuade her, she sells her inherited rare French books to purchase plane tickets for them all. Unable to discourage her, Ada and Marina accompany her.

In France, Eka searches for her son. She finally locates his old apartment, and is told the truth by his neighbors. Eka breaks down with the shock, but recovers and meets Ada and Marina, who they are due to return to Georgia. Instead of confronting them, Eka offers them a gracious way out by pretending that she now believes Otar could not make a living in France and had decided to move to America. She suggests that he did not tell them in order to avoid admitting his failure of in France.

At the airport, Ada tells Eka and Marina to go ahead while she purchases a magazine. While they women pass through security, Ada remains behind, as it becomes clear that Ada intends to stay in France. The film ends with their tearful goodbye through the windows of the departure gate.

== Cast ==
- Esther Gorintin as Eka
- Nino Khomasuridze as Marina
- Dinara Drukarova as Ada
- Temur Kalandadze as Tengiz
- Rusudan Bolkvadze as Rusiko
- Sasha Sarishvili as Alexi
- Duta Skhirtladze as Niko

== Awards and nominations ==
Award / Film Festival	Category	Recipients and nominees	Result
Cannes Film Festival	Critics Week Grand Prize	Julie Bertuccelli	Won
Cannes Film Festival	Grand Golden Rail	Julie Bertuccelli	Won
César Awards	Best Debut in Fiction	Julie Bertuccelli	Won
César Awards	Best Original Screenplay or Adaptation	Julie Bertuccelli; Roger Bohbot; Bernard Renucci	Nominated
César Awards	Most Promising Actress	Dinara Drukarova	Nominated
European Film Awards	Best Director	Julie Bertuccelli	Nominated
