= The Stroller Strategy =

- Film poster
- French: La stratégie de la poussette
- Directed by: Clément Michel
- Written by: Clément Michel
- Produced by: Alain Benguigui; Thomas Verhaeghe
- Starring: Raphaël Personnaz; Charlotte Le Bon; Jérôme Commandeur; Camélia Jordana; Julie Ferrier
- Cinematography: Steeven Petitteville
- Edited by: Julie Dupré
- Music by: Sylvain Ohrel
- Release date: 2 January 2013
- Running time: 90 min.
- Country: France
- Language: French
- Budget: $5 million
- Box office: $2.4 million

The Stroller Strategy (French: La stratégie de la poussette) is a 2013 French comedy film directed by Clément Michel. The musical score was composed by Sylvain Ohrel. The film starring Raphaël Personnaz and Charlotte Le Bon in the lead roles.

== Cast ==
- Raphaël Personnaz : Thomas Platz
- Charlotte Le Bon : Marie Deville
- Jérôme Commandeur : Paul Bordinot
- Camélia Jordana : Mélanie
- Julie Ferrier : Valérie
- Baltazar Rizzo]: Felipe
- François Berléand : Jean-Luc Hamory
- François Rollin : Franck Del Rio
- Anne Charrier : Lorraine
- Yelle : Flore
- Guilaine Londez : The nurse
- François Civil : François
