= Sébastien Schuller =

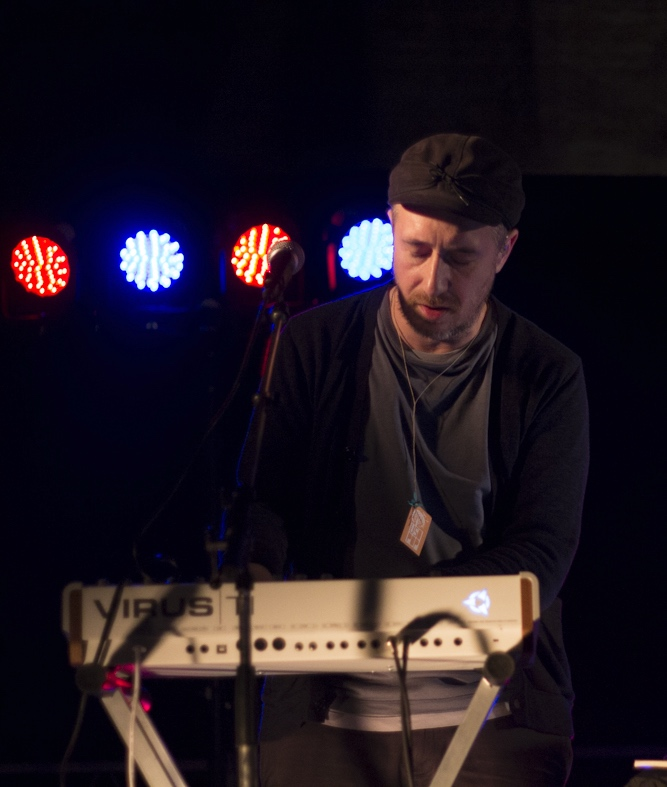
- Sébastien Schuller at Usopop festival, 2014

Background information
- Born: Jean-Sébastien Schuller; 26 August 1970 (age 55); Aubergenville, Yvelines, France
- Genres: Electronica, dream pop, trip hop, synthpop, indie pop, ambient
- Occupations: Singer-songwriter, record producer
- Instruments: Vocals, drums, synthesizer, piano, sampler, sequencer, laptop, percussion, guitar
- Years active: 1999–present
- Label: Sébastien Schuller
- Website: www.sebastienschuller.com

Sébastien Schuller (born 26 August 1970) is a French singer, songwriter and film score composer living in Philadelphia. His film scores include Toi et Moi, Notre univers impitoyable, Un Jour d'Été, One O One, High Society, The Night Eats the World.

== Discography ==
- 1999: Londres (EP, Warner Music France)
- 2002: Weeping Willow (EP, EMI Music France/Capitol Records)
- 2005: Happiness (LP, Catalogue Records/Wagram Music)
- 2005: Harmony (EP, Catalogue Records/Wagram Music)
- 2009: Evenfall (LP, PIAS France)
- 2014: Heat Wave (LP, self-produced)
- 2023: Introspection (LP, self-produced)
