= Alice and Martin =

Alice et Martin Alice and Martin
- Theatrical release poster
- Directed by: André Téchiné
- Written by: André Téchiné; Olivier Assayas; Gilles Taurand
- Produced by: Alain Sarde
- Starring: Juliette Binoche; Mathieu Amalric; Marthe Villalonga; Carmen Maura; Alexis Loret
- Cinematography: Caroline Champetier
- Edited by: Martine Giordano
- Music by: Philippe Sarde
- Production companies: Les Films Alain Sarde; France 2 Cinéma; France 3 Cinéma; Vertigo Films
- Distributed by: BAC Films (France); Vertigo Films (Spain)
- Release dates: 23 October 1998 (Spain); 4 November 1998 (France)
- Running time: 120 minutes
- Countries: France; Spain
- Language: French
- Budget: €9.1 million
- Box office: $3 million

Alice et Martin (US title: Alice and Martin) is a 1998 French film, a psychological drama, directed by André Téchiné. It stars Juliette Binoche and Alexis Loret. It is Téchiné's second collaboration with Binoche after the 1985 film Rendez-vous. The plot follows the two title characters, Martin, a male model, and Alice, a struggling violinist. Their romance is shattered when Martin's troubled past begins to haunt him.

== Plot ==
At age ten, Martin is living in Cahors with Jeanine, his hairdresser mother and her taxi-driver lover, Said. Martin is the illegitimate child of a successful business man, Victor Sauvagnac. Against the child’s wishes his mother sends Martin to live with his father, whom until then he does not know. Victor is married and has three sons older than Martin. The move is not a happy one and quickly Martin finds himself in conflict with his brash, cold father.

Ten years later, just after his twentieth birthday, Martin flees his home following his father's death. He disappears wandering across the country side and tries unsuccessfully to drown himself. Martin emerges weeks later at his half-brother Benjamin’s apartment in Paris. Benjamin is a struggling actor sharing living arrangements with his best friend Alice, a violinist in a local quintet that specializes in tango music. More outgoing than his younger brother, Benjamin, who is gay, has a close platonic relationship with Alice. Martin finds success quickly–within weeks he is a highly sought-after model. Alice is nervous and brittle, harboring her own private grief, the tragic death at age eleven of her gifted sister. At first Alice resents Martin's presence in the apartment and she is cold towards him. Though Alice does not like the brooding Martin much, he becomes obsessed with her and starts surreptitiously following her. Alice discovers it and confronts him. She is gradually captivated by his attentions, and the two begin a passionate love affair.

Leaving Benjamin behind, Alice accompanies Martin to Granada, Spain, on a modeling shoot. Their happiness is brief. During the trip Martin's behavior becomes erratic and he becomes more and more self-obsessed. When Alice reveals she is pregnant, his decline continues. Martin suffers a nervous breakdown and falls into coma. The doctors determine that his condition is psychosomatic. In an effort to restore his health, Alice rents a cabin by the sea in Spain’s south coast. Martin swims for hours each night, but remains withdrawn. He is haunted by his father’s death.

A flashback recounts the period preceding Victor Sauvagnac’s death. His relationship with his sons was problematic: the aimless and withdrawn Martin failed to please him; Benjamin irritated him and a reunion about the prospects of the family's business ended up in a fist fight between François and Frédéric, the two eldest siblings. Martin celebrates his 20th birthday with Benjamin, who comes from Paris for the occasion. Their reunion is interrupted by a phone call from François who commits suicide hanging himself in the family's factory. When Martin decides to leave for Paris an argument erupts and Martin pushes his father downs the stairs killing him. Unable to deal with what he has just done, Martin runs away.

After Martin reveals that he caused his father's death, unable to bear the guilt and pain any longer, he commits himself to a mental institution. Alice, following Martin’s wishes, travels to Cahors to talk to the Sauvagnac family. She befriends Martin's mother, but Lucie, Victor’s widow, is unsympathetic. Frédéric Sauvagnac, who is the town's major, is openly hostile. Benjamin comes to town in an effort to stop Alice interfering in his family affairs. However the two reconcile. Eventually Lucie decides to tell the authorities about Martin’s culpability in her husband’s death. Martin confesses his crime, surrenders to the authorities and goes to prison. Alice decides to have her baby. She appears playing her violin in a wedding. Martin is in prison but, in a letter to Alice, he seems to be finally at peace with himself.

== Cast ==
- Juliette Binoche as Alice
- Alexis Loret as Martin
- Mathieu Amalric as Benjamin
- Marthe Villalonga as Lucie Sauvagnac
- Pierre Maguelon as Victor Sauvagnac
- Carmen Maura as Jeanine
- Jean-Pierre Lorit as Frédéric Sauvagnac
- Erik Kreikenmayer as François Sauvagnac
- Franck de la Personne as The Examining Magistrate
- Jeremy Kreikenmayer as Martin as a child

== Production ==
The script was written by André Téchiné and his frequent scriptwriting partner Gilles Taurand with the help of Olivier Assayas. Filming took place on location in France (Paris and the southwest Cahors region and Duravel in the Lot valley) and Spain (Granada), where Martin's climactic breakdown occurs.

== Release ==
Alice et Martin had its world premiere at the 1998 Valladolid International Film Festival in the presence of André Téchiné, Juliette Binoche and Alain Sarde. The version screened ran at 114 mins, 10 mins shorter than the version that was released theatrically. The film premiered in France on 4 November 1998.

== Reception ==
Alice et Martin, Téchiné’s thirteenth film, came after a string of three critic and artistic successful films: My Favorite Season (1993) (Ma saison préférée); Wild Reeds (1994) (Les roseaux sauvages) and, Thieves (Les voleurs) (1996). In a general consensus, critics and audiences perceived Alice et Martin as a disappointment, particularly due to the grim nature of the plot. The star power of Juliette Binoche, who became known to the American public thanks her Oscar-winning performance in The English Patient, was not enough for the film to find a large audience. In France, the reviewer in Cahiers du cinéma raised doubts about the film’s narrative procedure and the incongruity of the epic sweep and the banal family narrative depicted.

A review in Sight and Sound described the "masterly dissection of male hysteria" in a film where "most of the major characters are scarred by family histories". The reviewer noted that though "dense and powerful in its emotional force", the film's melodrama is balanced by the lead performances; Loret "shifty, pale and sympathetic", Binoche developing her role "with a charged finesse", embarking on her path to adult love through her lover's growing self-realisation. The reviewer concluded that it was "literary film-making... from the richness of its characterisation to the acuity of its structure. Both a cold melodrama and a psyched-up Bressonian case study, Alice et Martin is a masterly opening-up of classical French intimiste themes".

Rotten Tomatoes reported that 62% of 42 sampled critics gave the film positive reviews. Andrew Sarris from The New York Observer called the film "not to be missed". Jonathan Rosenbaum from Chicago Reader commented that "The sheer neurotic intensity of Techine's characters -- characteristically stretching both backward and forward in time, as in a Faulkner novel--holds one throughout, as does Techine's masterful direction and many of the other performances".

A.O. Scott in The New York Times called Alice et Martin " A richly populated, observant film that suffers, forgivable, from an excess of curiosity about the world it depicts -- a surfeit of generosity, intelligence and art". Edward Guthmann in the San Francisco Chronicle saw the film as " heartfelt and passionate and brave in what it attempts to explore. It is only a qualified success". In his review for Los Angeles Times, Kevin Thomas described it as " Boldly structured, intensely focused and briskly paced, Alice and Martin has a tremendous emotional density that places the utmost demands upon its actors--and asks a lot of audiences, too." While in a disagreeing note Lisa Schwarzbaum from Entertainment Weekly said that "It's as if, in exploring the scars that shape these personalities, Téchiné has forgotten to color in the flesh."

== DVD release ==
Alice et Martin is available in Region 2 DVD. Audio in French and English subtitles. The only extra feature Is the film's trailer. There is no Region 1 DVD available.

A blu-ray disc of the film was released in 2010 by Studio Canal, which included a 28-minute feature entitled 'Autour d'un amour impossible, la petite musique d'André Téchiné'.
