= Alexis Loret =

French actor

- Born: 10 January 1975 (age 51); Saint Lô, Manche, France
- Occupation: Actor
- Years active: 1995–present

Alexis Loret (French pronunciation: [alɛksi lɔʁɛ]; born 10 January 1975) is a French film and television actor.

Devoting himself initially to cabinetmaking, he became a model, and was noticed by André Téchiné.

== Selected filmography ==
- Alice et Martin (Alice and Martin) (1998)
- Le Jour de grâce (short, 2000)
- Sans plomb (Unleaded) (2000)
- Gamer (2001)
- Toutes les nuits (2001)
- Les Visiteurs en Amérique (2001)
- Backstage (short, 2001)
- Le Nom du feu (short, 2002)
- Brocéliande (2002)
- The Assassinated Sun (2002)
- Le Monde vivant (The Living World) (2003)
- Mariages! (2004)
- Marseille (2004)
- Le Pont des Arts (2004)
- UV (2007)
- L'Année suivante (2007)
- Impardonnables (Unforgivable) (2011)
- Qui vive (Insecure) (2014)
- Mon Amie Victoria (2014)
- En équilibre (2015)
- Quand on a 17 ans (Being 17) (2016)
- Transferts (2017)
- Soul Mates (2023)

== Television ==
- La philo selon Philippe (5 episodes, 1995–1996)
- Louis la brocante (1 episode, 1999)
- Les Déracinés (2001)
- L' Algérie des chimères (2001)
- Nestor Burma (1 episode, 2002)
- Pierre et Jean (2004)
- Mademoiselle Gigi (2004)
- SoeurThérèse.com (1 episode, 2006)
- Sartre, l'âge des passions (2006)
- Au nom des fils (TV film, 2015)
- Les Innocents (TV series, 2018)
