= Stéphane Plaza =

French television presenter and estate agent

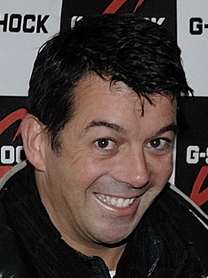
- Plaza in 2009
- Born: Stéphane Gilles Plaza; 9 June 1970 (age 55); Suresnes, France
- Occupations: Television presenter Estate agent
- Years active: 2006–present
- Employer: M6
- Known for: Recherche appartement ou maison Maison à vendre

Stéphane Gilles Plaza (born 9 June 1970) is a French television presenter and an estate agent. He hosts the television shows Recherche appartement ou maison (since 2006) and Maison à vendre (since 2007), both broadcast on M6. He has explained that he became a television presenter after a casting by Reservoir Prod.

== Filmography ==
- 2018: J'ai perdu Albert

== Bibliography ==
- Stéphane Plaza, Recherche appartement ou maison, Hachette Pratique editions, 191 pages

== Biography ==
Stéphane Plaza was born to Raymond Plaza, who had been a champion cyclist as a youth, but who abandoned that dream in order to work in a flower shop with a young woman, who became Stéphane's mother.

As a youth, Stéphane worked aboard the trains of SNCF before becoming involved in real estate sales and leasing.

Stéphane was asked by an interviewer if he was living with someone. He replied in the affirmative, but declined to give further details.
