= Imany =

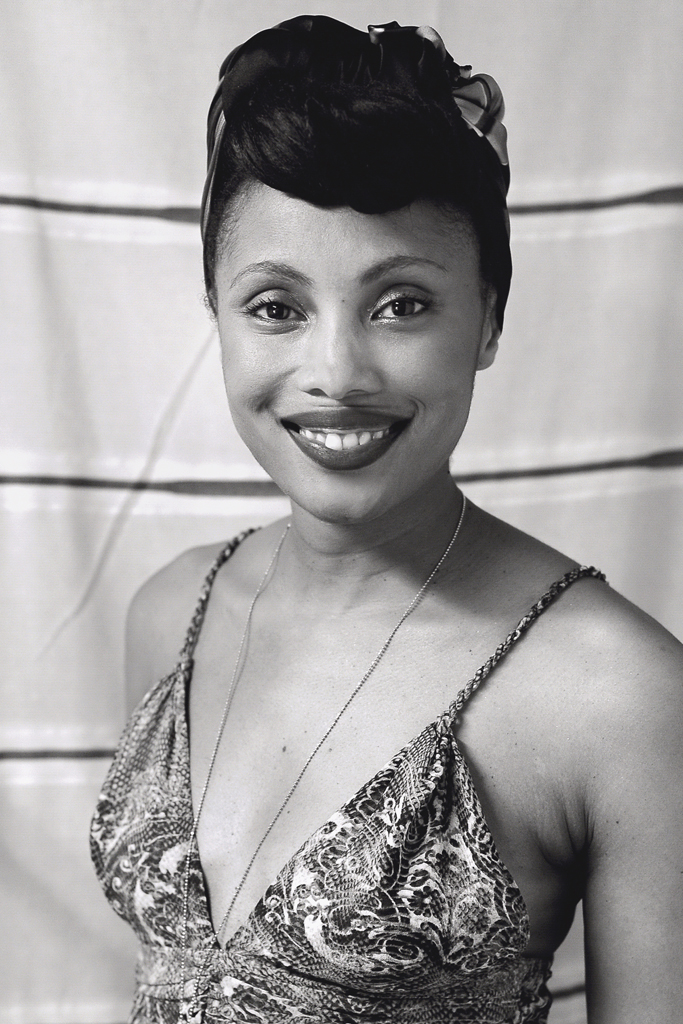
- Imany in September 2011

Background information
- Born: Nadia Mladjao; 5 April 1979 (age 47); Martigues, Bouches-du-Rhône, France
- Genres: Folk; soul; blues; pop
- Occupation: Singer-songwriter
- Years active: 2008–present
- Labels: Think Zik!; Sony

Nadia Mladjao (born 5 April 1979), better known by her stage name Imany (/ˈɪməni/ IM-ə-nee), is a French pop-soul recording artist of Comorian descent. Her debut album, The Shape of a Broken Heart, which was released in 2011, reached platinum status in France, Greece and triple platinum in Poland.

Imany’s work frequently engages themes of resilience, emotional struggle, personal autonomy, and the search for meaning. Critics and interviewers note her emphasis on narrative clarity and emotional sincerity; she often describes her songwriting as a process rooted in storytelling and melodic exploration. Her performances are marked by a combination of vocal intensity and restrained acoustic accompaniment, a stylistic choice that underscores her preference for directness over ornamentation.

== Early life ==
She was born in Martigues near Marseille, in a family from the Comoros in 1979. Her stage name, Imany (Imani) means faith in Swahili (from Arabic إيمان - imaan). As a youth, she was an athlete, doing high jump.

== Career ==
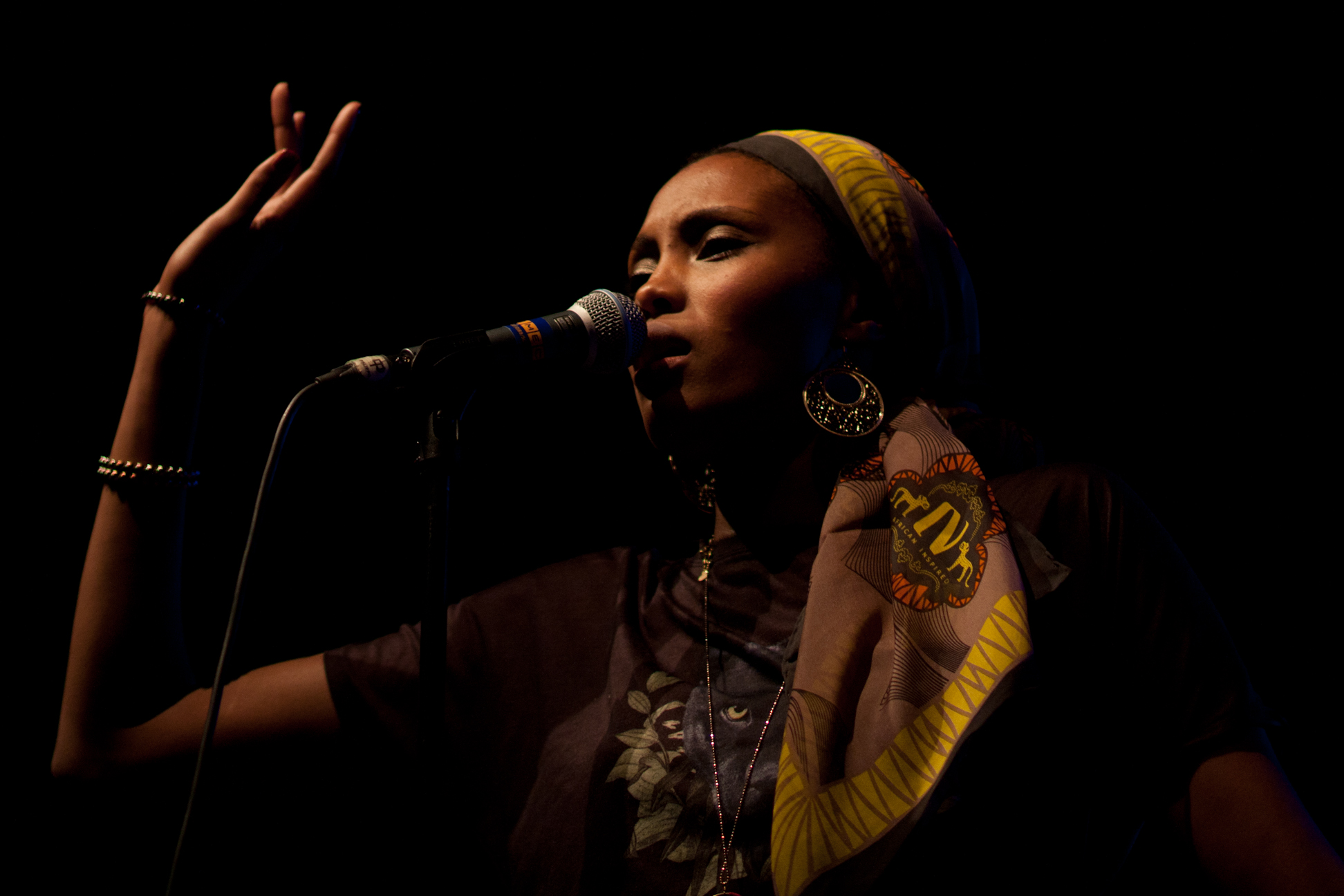
Imany in Brussels in 2011

She became a model for Ford Models Europe. She went to the United States for seven years, before coming back to France, when she started her singing career.

In 2008, she began singing. She performed at the Beau Lounge, at the Réservoir, at the Bellevilloise, and at the China Club.

Imany’s first album, The Shape of a Broken Heart, which was named after a drawing she made with closed eyes, contains twelve songs written in English.

Imany produced the soundtrack for the 2014 film French Women by Audrey Dana.

In 2016 the Filatov & Karas remix of her song "Don't Be So Shy" became a Europe-wide hit, topping the charts in Austria, France, Germany, Poland and Russia.

== Activism ==
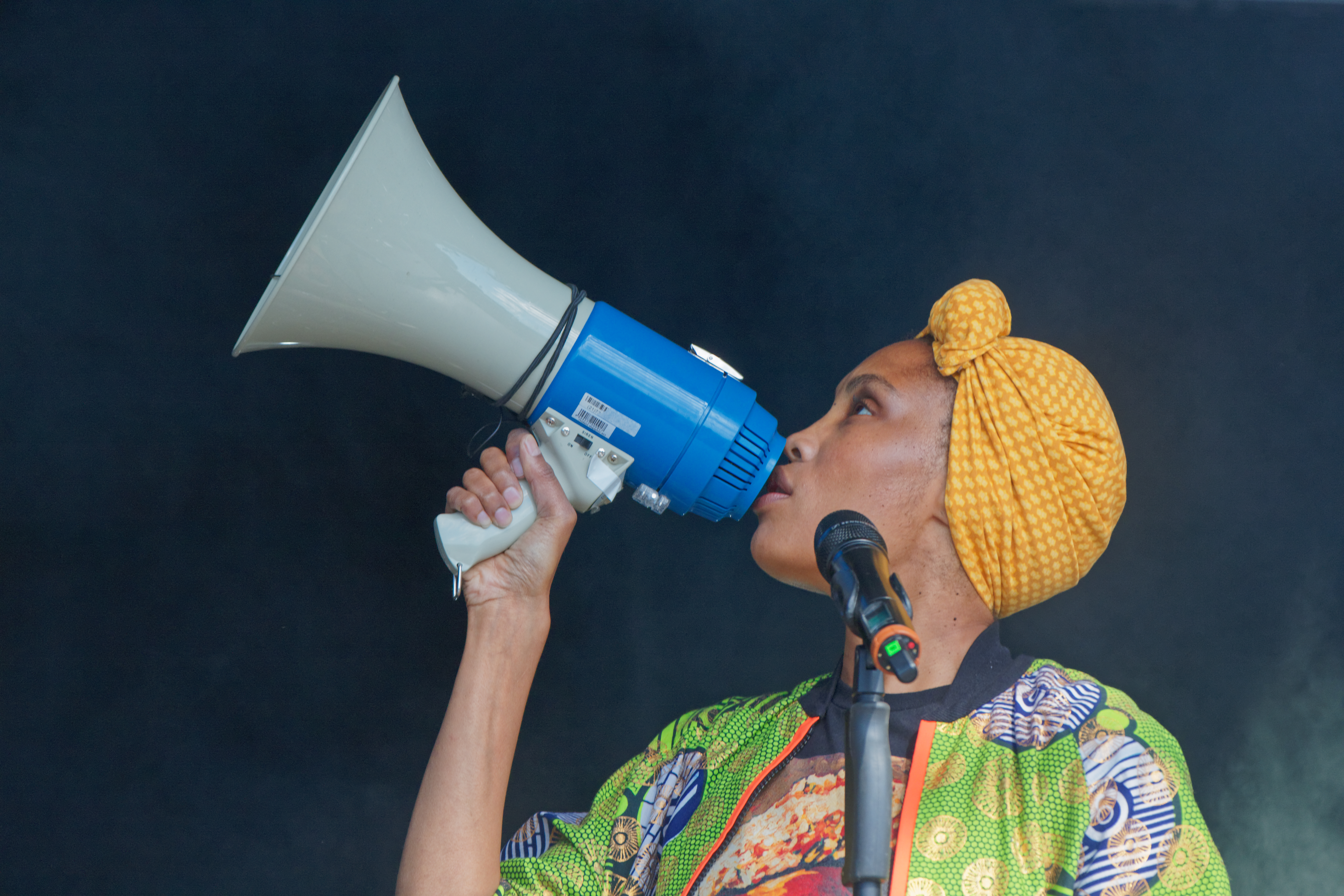
Imany at a festival in 2017

Her public presence often merges artistic and social concerns. Performances and public commentary consistently situate her as a cultural figure attentive to questions of gender justice, lived experience, and emotional wellbeing—an alignment evident in later works such as her project Women Deserve Rage (2025), which explores themes of empowerment, anger, and self‑assertion through a feminist lens. Beyond her musical output, Imany is involved in health advocacy, particularly through her work with ENDOmind, an organization focused on raising awareness about endometriosis, a condition affecting millions of women worldwide. Her participation in this initiative reflects a broader engagement with issues of bodily autonomy, women’s health, and social visibility.

== Awards and nominations ==
Award	Year	Nominee(s)	Category	Result	Ref.
Echo Music Prize	2017	Imany	Best International Newcomer	Nominated	
Echo Music Prize	2017	Imany	Best International Female	Nominated	
Echo Music Prize	2017	"Don't Be So Shy"	Hit of the Year	Nominated	

== Discography ==
=== Studio albums ===
List of albums, with selected chart positions and certifications
Title	Album details	Peak chart positions								Certifications
Title	Album details	FRA	AUT	BEL (Fl)	BEL (Wa)	GER	ITA	POL	SWI	Certifications
The Shape of a Broken Heart	Released: 9 May 2011; Label: Think Zik!; Formats: CD, digital download	19	—	55	47	47	10	4	36	FRA: Platinum; ZPAV: 3× Platinum
The Wrong Kind of War	Released: 26 August 2016; Label: Think Zik!; Formats: CD, digital download	7	23	49	19	19	40	10	9	FRA: Platinum; ZPAV: Gold
Voodoo Cello	Released: 3 September 2021; Label: Think Zik!; Formats: CD, digital download	24	—	—	92	34	—	34	47	
"—" denotes a recording that did not chart or was not released in that territory.

=== Extended plays ===
List of EPs
Title	EP details
Acoustic Sessions	Released: 15 October 2010; Label: Think Zik!; Formats: digital download
There Were Tears	Released: 26 April 2016; Label: Think Zik!; Formats: CD, digital download
No Reason No Rhyme	Released: 14 April 2017; Label: Think Zik!; Formats: digital download
Time Only Moves	Released: 25 October 2019; Label: Think Zik!; Formats: CD, digital download

=== Soundtracks ===
List of albums, with selected chart positions and certifications
Title	Album details	Peak chart positions			Certifications
Title	Album details	FRA	BEL (Wa)	POL	Certifications
Sous les jupes des filles (soundtrack - Imany and various artists)	Released: 26 May 2014; Label: Think Zik!; Formats: CD, digital download	84	120	16	ZPAV: Gold

=== Singles ===
==== As lead artist ====
List of singles, with chart positions and certifications, showing year released and album name
Single	Year	Peak chart positions										Certifications	Album
Single	Year	FRA	AUS	AUT	BEL (Wa)	GER	ITA	JPN	POL	RUS	SWI	Certifications	Album
"You Will Never Know"	2011	26	—	—	— (Note: "You Will Never Know" did not enter the Wallonia Ultratop 50, but peaked at number 20 on the Ultratip chart.)	—	2	—	5	1	—	FIMI: 2× Platinum	The Shape of a Broken Heart
"Please and Change"	2011	—	—	—	—	—	—	56	—	—	—		The Shape of a Broken Heart
"The Good the Bad & the Crazy"	2014	79	—	—	— (Note: "The Good the Bad & the Crazy" did not enter the Wallonia Ultratop 50, but peaked at number 42 on the Ultratip chart.)	—	—	—	—	1	—		Sous les jupes des filles soundtrack
"Don't Be So Shy" (Filatov & Karas remix)	2015	1	9	1	3	1	22	—	1	1	3	ARIA: Platinum; BEA: Gold; BVMI: Diamond; FIMI: 3× Platinum; IFPI AUT: Gold; IFPI SWI: 2× Platinum; ZPAV: Diamond	The Wrong Kind of War
"There Were Tears"	2016	50	—	—	—	—	—	—	38	—	—		The Wrong Kind of War
"Silver Lining (Clap Your Hands)"	2016	38	—	—	— (Note: "Silver Lining (Clap Your Hands)" did not enter the Wallonia Ultratop 50, but peaked at number 6 on the Ultratip chart.)	—	—	—	—	—	—		The Wrong Kind of War
"Nothing to Save"	2016	179	—	—	—	—	—	—	—	—	—		The Wrong Kind of War
"No Reason No Rhyme"	2017	171	—	—	—	—	—	—	—	—	—		The Wrong Kind of War
"Hey Little Sister"	2019	—	—	—	—	—	—	—	—	—	—		Time Only Moves
"Wonderful Life (Stream Jockey Rework)"	2021	—	—	—	—	—	—	—	19	—	—		Voodoo Cello
"The A Team"	2021	—	—	—	—	—	—	—	—	—	—		Voodoo Cello
"Like a Prayer"	2021	—	—	—	—	—	—	—	—	—	—		Voodoo Cello
"—" denotes a recording that did not chart or was not released in that territory.

==== As featured artist ====
Single	Year	Peak chart positions		Album
Single	Year	FRA	BEL (Wa)	Album
"Le mystère féminin" (Kery James featuring Imany)	2013	120	— (Note: "Le mystère féminin" did not enter the Wallonia Ultratop 50, but peaked at number 10 on the Ultratip chart.)	Dernier MC
