= Hippocrate (TV series) =

2018 television medical drama series

- Genre: Medical drama
- Created by: Thomas Lilti
- Written by: Thomas Lilti; Anaïs Carpita; Claude Le Pape
- Directed by: Thomas Lilti
- Starring: Louise Bourgoin; Alice Belaïdi; Karim Leklou; Zacharie Chasseriaud; Anne Consigny; Éric Caravaca
- Original language: French
- No. of seasons: 3
- No. of episodes: 22

Production
- Running time: 50–55 minutes

Original release
- Network: Canal+
- Release: 26 November 2018

Related
- Hippocrate

Hippocrate (English: Interns) is a French television medical drama series, which was broadcast from 26 November 2018 on Canal+. It was created and directed by former medical doctor Thomas Lilti as a spin-off from his 2014 film of the same name. The series is set in the Raymond Poincaré Hospital and follows three interns, Chloé (Louise Bourgoin), Alyson (Alice Belaïdi) and Hugo (Zacharie Chasseriaud), as well as forensic pathologist Arben (Karim Leklou). All four are assigned as ward doctors to the Internal Medicine department when the usual doctors on duty have been home quarantined due to an unknown infection. Hippocrate's first season of eight episodes was co-written by Lilti, Anaïs Carpita and Claude Le Pape. Hospital scenes were filmed in a disused wing of the Centre Hospitalier Robert Ballanger (Robert Ballanger Hospital Centre) using equipment from the associated hospital.

Lilti announced in November 2018 that shooting the second season was due to begin in late 2019. Filming of that season began in January 2020 but was interrupted due to the COVID-19 pandemic in France. During France's first nation-wide lockdown, from March to May 2020, Lilti resumed medical duties to assist hospital staff where he had been filming and also provided medical equipment, which had been purchased for the series. The second season was broadcast from 5 April 2021 with Bourgoin, Belaïdi, Leklou and Chasseriaud reprising their roles. For this series the hospital's Emergency Department is flooded and patients are transferred to Internal Medicine where the team deal with greater workloads and personal issues. All 16 episodes of both seasons were streamed in Australia via SBS on Demand from 8 September 2022. In June 2021 Lilti announced plans for a third season, filming started in March 2023 with broadcasting due in September 2024.

== Plot ==
Raymond Poincaré Hospital's Internal Medicine's staff are sent home to quarantine after a patient died of an unknown pathogen. Only three interns are available to treat the ward's patients: Chloé, Alyson and Hugo. They work with reduced nursing staff. Head of their department, Manuel monitors them from his home; he is Chloé's secret lover. Pathologist Arben is reassigned to Internal Medicine and has not treated a live patient in five years. Chloé hides her heart valve operation from others and aspires to become an Intensive Care Unit (ICU) doctor. Hugo's mother, Muriel, heads ICU and had mentored Chloé. Hugo seeks popularity with his peers and over-estimates his abilities. He initially lies about his mistake with an attempted suicide patient, Marion. Alyson and Hugo become lovers. With hospital administrator Nathalie's permission the interns reduce patient numbers to lighten their workload. Muriel opportunistically moves her post-ICU patients into Internal Medicine's newly vacated rooms. Alyson, who is hesitant and lacking confidence, acknowledges her mistake when she tested Marion. Chloé collapses and administration's lawyers prepare to foist blame for Marion's death onto her. Alyson, Arben and Hugo rally to support Chloé and apprise Marion's parents of the ward's dire conditions. Quarantine is lifted with the pathogen partly identified as a tropical, mosquito-borne virus. Manuel and other doctors resume work.

Manuel has been transferred to Lyon. Poincaré's Emergency Department (ED) is flooded when a frozen pipe bursts. Equipment, patients and personnel are transferred to Internal Medicine with Olivier and Saïd reassigning Chloé, Alyson and Hugo to join Igor in handling ED patients. Chloé's damaged left arm restricts her to lighter cases. Hugo works with Fred in triage. Arben is now an Order of Malta ambulance driver-paramedic until he brings carbon monoxide poisoning victims to Poincaré. After a rocky start Alyson responds positively to ED's challenging cases. With Olivier's consent, Arben starts practising medicine again despite Nathalie's concerns about his certification. Igor overworks, which results in memory lapses and a patient's test scans are forgotten. Arben finds the patient collapsed in an isolation room. Once the patient's scan shows up, Olivier and Saïd sort out Igor's other patients and reassign active cases to Alyson and Chloé. With growing confidence Chloé diagnoses cases for Olivier and Muriel. Hugo finds Igor collapsed in ICU's open high pressure chamber. Initially reviving Igor the team try to find whether he attempted suicide. Chloé uses computer search results and Igor's vitals to deduce his chloroquine overdose but Igor dies. During the early stages of COVID-19 pandemic in France, Chloé works in ICU while Alyson is in ED. Manuel returns to look after hospital's infected geriatrics. Arben's documentation is up-to-date and he asks to help Olivier in ED.

== Cast and characters ==
=== Main cast ===
- Louise Bourgoin as Chloé Antovska: fourth year intern, Manuel's domestic partner, Muriel's former protégé, treats female-to-male (FtoM) and post-ICU patients. Hides her aortic valve replacement operation, which causes heart problems, she collapses. Upon recovery she has lost use of her left arm, assigned to sorting and archiving files. After ED's flooding, reassigned to minor ED cases
- Alice Belaïdi as Alyson Lévêque: newly appointed first year intern, assigned to Geriatrics, becomes Hugo's lover. Reassigned to ED patients
- Karim Leklou as Arben Bascha: Albanian-born forensic pathologist, former gastroenterologist, reassigned to Internal Medicine. Later works as a paramedic-ambulance driver for Order of Malta.
- Zacharie Chasseriaud as Hugo Wagner: first year intern, Muriel's son, becomes Alyson's lover. Reassigned to ED patients
- Anne Consigny as Muriel Wagner: head of Intensive care unit (ICU), Hugo's mother
- Éric Caravaca as Manuel Simoni: head of Internal Medicine, home quarantined with unknown infection, Chloé's domestic partner. (season 1) Transferred to Lyon (off-screen); returns when COVID-19 pandemic occurs.
- Bouli Lanners as Olivier Brun (season 2): head of Emergency Department (ED), keeps a Flemish Giant rabbit in a ward's storeroom

=== Additional cast ===
- Bellamine Abdelmalek as Lazare Pintao: ICU intern, Hugo's contemporary
- Sylvie Lachat as Martine Bogossian: Internal Medicine head nurse
- Théo Navarro-Mussy as Igor Jurozak: ED intern
- Mustapha Abourachid as Saïd Larouchi: ED doctor, Igor's supervisor
- Géraldine Nakache as Nathalie Ferrand: hospital administrator
- Oussama Kheddam as Rachid Bensadi: nurse in Hugo's sector
- Paul Delbreil as Nadi: ICU nurse, works with Lazare
- Christophe Ntakabanyura as Marcel Diop: nurse
- Géraldine Schitter as Dorothée Rummel: nurse in Arben's sector
- Laurette Tessier as Laura Millon: nurse
- Pierre Cévaër as Kim: neonatal intern, Hugo's contemporary
- Fabrice Robin as Fabrice/Infirmier réa (English: "nurse"): ED nurse
- Blanche Cluzet as Stéphanie Guenolec: ICU nurse, monitors high pressure chamber
- Lucile Chevalier as Louise Blachet: radiology nurse, works for Neuville
- Régis Iacono as Radiologue (English: "Radiologist")/Simon Neuville: head of radiology
- Philippe Bertin as Yves Genton: pathologist, Arben's colleague
- Marie Petiot as Stella Magrou: nurse
- Hubert Myon as Dominique: administrative assistant
- Michel Masiero as Jacques Drobert: patient, owns dog Timi
- Amir El Kacem as Samir: Alyson's boyfriend, school teacher; breaks up with Alyson
- Luc Leclerc du Sablon as Docteur (English: Doctor) Cohen: Internal Medicine doctor, home quarantined; becomes Alyson's supervisor before she joins ED team
- Hélèna Guihard as Marion Riviere: 17-year-old attempted suicide patient, later dies
- Shawn Delair as Fred Laurin (formerly Vanessa Laurin): Chloé's FtoM mastectomy patient
- Michaël Perez as Fred Iao: ED triage nurse, sets up in Manuel's former office
- Jackie Berroyer as Jean-Pierre Bayle: short-term replacement doctor, former GP
- Valentin Papoudof as Pierre: nurse
- Cécile Gallissaires as Mme Marciano/Josiane Marchiano: brain hemorrhage patient found in isolation room
- Séverine Mollet as Infirmière urgences (English: "Emergency Nurse")/Maëlle: ED nurse
- Jeanne Buchard as Anna Jurozak: Igor's sister, nurse, becomes an extern in Pediatrics
- Myra Bitout as Florence Molina: bruised and battered patient
- Philippe Cariou as Arnaud Colin: head of Emergency department
- Armand Antonioli as Dr. Lanthier: Geriatrics doctor, home quarantined
- Leticia Guttierez as Dr. Zerbib: dermatologist, home quarantined

== Episodes ==
=== Season one ===
No. overall	No. in season	Title	Directed by	Written by	Original release date
1	1	"Episode 1"	Thomas Lilti	Thomas Lilti, Anaïs Carpita, Claude Le Pape, Julien Lilti	26 November 2018
Martine introduces Alyson to Chloé and Hugo. Chloé assigns Alyson to Geriatrics. Ward's doctors are quarantined at home. Nathalie informs Arben that he will not perform autopsy on infected patient. Hugo accepts Marion's transfer. Chloé, via phone, updates Manuel. Martine advises Alyson to commence rounds. Alyson's first patient's already dead. Chloé observes Alyson's hesitancy and inefficiency. Muriel refuses Chloé's request to swap out Alyson. Chloé berates Hugo for accepting Marion without consulting her. Hugo attends an amputee. Chloé informs Alyson that they must remain overnight. Alyson's unable to answer questions from dead patient's family. Alyson take's corpse to morgue. Martine introduces Jacques to Chloé. Manuel confirms Jacques requires an abdominal puncture. Hugo and Alyson begin but Hugo's called to tend Marion. Alyson completes puncture but Chloé notices Jacques's adverse reaction; Jacques was infected. Samir arrives with Alyson's dinner. Chloé sleeps in ward bed. Hugo gives Marion her phone but leaves her cabinet unlocked. Hugo's satisfied by Jacques's biopsy, but Chloé realises it's anomalous. Jacques has ruptured foodtube veins. Marion overdoses with pills; returned to ICU. Hugo asks Arben to treat Jacques. Chloé informs Manuel of Arben's operation on Jacques. Chloé has a heart operation scar.
2	2	"Episode 2"	Thomas Lilti	Thomas Lilti, Anaïs Carpita, Claude Le Pape, Julien Lilti	3 December 2018
Nathalie informs ward staff that doctors' quarantine continues pending pathogen's identification. Arben tends his sector with Dorothée. Marion's in a coma. ED overflow leaves patient John in Chloé's sector. John starts thrashing and Alyson assigns him to Arben. Nathalie consults Chloé, Manuel, Arnaud and Muriel. They adopt "summer mode": send some patients home and transfer others to nearby hospitals. Manuel and colleagues isolate in hotel rooms. Each intern determines which patients are to be sent home or elsewhere thereby freeing up one ward sector. Muriel asks for description of Marion's overdose. Hugo claims cabinet was open with key in door; pills on Marion's bed. Hugo suggests Marion retrieved keys herself. John has a psychotic fit; Chloé injects a sedative with psychiatrist's approval. Hugo, Chloé and Arben help Alyson find patient Jeanette's dentures in trash. Hugo and Chloé determine that John's penile abscess, from his piercing, blocked urination and distended his bladder. Initially Marion states Hugo left cabinet door open. Hugo convinces Marion to claim she took cabinet key. Arben and team clear their ward sector. Arben takes on night duty. Chloé checks Manuel's flat for him. Muriel moves her post-ICU patients into Internal Medicine's freed sector.
3	3	"Episode 3"	Thomas Lilti	Thomas Lilti, Anaïs Carpita, Claude Le Pape, Julien Lilti	10 December 2018
Alyson plans to change hospitals. Muriel ignores Hugo, Chloé and Arben's complaints about foisting post-ICU patients onto their ward. Manuel supports their cause. Alyson arrives late. Arben scolds Jacques, who denies drinking alcohol despite his BAC of 2.15‰. Hugo tells dermatology patient Patricia that her rash has gone and she can leave. Chloé cautions Hugo to wait for full diagnosis. Patricia starts fitting, Hugo has to drain Patricia's lungs with a fluid build-up. Arben's multiple sclerosis patient refuses to notify his sister. Lazare shuns Hugo over Marion's condition worsening: Marion now requires liver transplant. Chloé informs Manuel that Muriel's becoming abrasive. Arben notices Fred's sepsis but cannot contact Chloé; Fred sent to ICU. After body scans, Hugo and Alyson notify Patricia that she has a chest lymphoma. Chloé returns from heart valve check-up. She treats Fred's convulsions with Muriel's assent. Hugo announces Alyson's leaving hospital to Arben and Chloé. Fred recovers and returns to Internal Medicine. Alyson discovers her new supervisor uses passive learning techniques; she leaves. Hugo gains popularity against rivals, Kim and Lazare, to become cafeteria's bursar. Alyson reverts to Internal Medicine. Chloé's cardiologist orders her to take sick leave and rest.
4	4	"Episode 4"	Thomas Lilti	Thomas Lilti, Anaïs Carpita, Claude Le Pape, Julien Lilti	17 December 2018
Chloé's sector has post-ICU patients; she updates their condition to Muriel. Lavare brings Marion into Chloé's care. Manuel's upset that Chloé caved-in on Muriel's offloading patients. Hugo and Alyson attend heart patient, Philippe. Nurses are annoyed by Chloé's frosty attitude. New FtoM patient notices Chloé's unfocussed nature. Chloé scans her own heart, asks cardiologist's opinion but he wants to see the patient. Arben and Marcel treat burns victim. For Alyson's first overnight on call, Chloé asks her to look after FtoM patient. Alyson stalls Samir, while noticing Hugo and Laura flirting. Marcel alerts Alyson to Philippe's emergency; he's had severe stroke. Arben asks Nathalie to lift quarantine, however she's not authorised. Chloé determines Phillippe's unresponsiveness, refers him to neurosurgery. Arben's concerned for Chloé's welfare, but she denies any problems. Hugo and Alyson are confused by Phillippe's two wives, Valérie and Sandrine. Virologists found an unidentified tropical arbovirus but cannot lift quarantine. Chloé tends Marion; leaves for burns victim and suggests ketamine. Alyson takes Marion's blood samples. Nathalie scolds Arben for querying virologists. Trains are cancelled, Alyson stays with Hugo: they have sex. Marion has cardiac arrest, Chloé uses Defibrillator, applies CPR and adrenaline but Marion dies. Muriel sees Alyson leaving Hugo's bed. Arben comforts Chloé.
5	5	"Episode 5"	Thomas Lilti	Thomas Lilti, Anaïs Carpita, Claude Le Pape, Julien Lilti	24 December 2018
Alyson and Hugo learn of Marion's death. Nathalie notifies Marion's parents. Nathalie queries why Chloé was tending Marion, who was an ICU patient. Arben attends muscle weakness patient Sarah. Hugo faints while treating Jacques. Manuel admonishes Chloé for working while on sick leave. Replacement doctors, Guillemain and Jean, start shifts alongside Alyson and Hugo. Nathalie assigns Arben to Marion's autopsy and requires his tenure application. Hugo and Jean acquire Arben's patients. Hugo admits to Lavare leaving Marion's cabinet unlocked. Guillemain explains to Alyson that a patient has an autoimmune disorder but Guillemain has misdiagnosed symptoms. Arben and Yves check Marion's medications: did Chloé prescribe too much antibiotic? Samir picks up Alyson, asks Hugo to join them for drinks. Chloé ignores Manuel's calls. Guillemain supervises Chloé when she attends Fred. Jean analyses Sarah's muscles. Guillemain displays transgender discrimination to Fred. With the help of an interpreter, Alyson diagnoses Lyme disease instead of autoimmune disorder, which is confirmed by biopsy. Jean falls asleep at his computer. Muriel advises Hugo not to inform Marion's parents of his error. Realising his mistakes, Guillemain leaves in mid-shift. Marion's antibiotics are okay, but she had high potassium levels. Manuel threatens to tell Muriel about Chloé's condition.
6	6	"Episode 6"	Thomas Lilti	Thomas Lilti, Anaïs Carpita, Claude Le Pape, Julien Lilti	31 December 2018
Nathalie asks Arben to fill-in due to Guillemain's absence. Hugo attends Florence, who was hit by a bicycle. When Alyson's patient Augustin begins fitting on his bed, she treats him for epilepsy. Jean arrives too late to assist. Dominique cannot find Arben's diploma for his tenure application. Chloé delays Fred's discharge due to his transitioning concerns. Augustin starts hallucinating before fitting, again; his scans indicate possible meningitis. Yves found there was a blood-sampling error in Marion's pre-CPR test. Arben queries Chloé about Marion's sampling. Arben and Chloé review Alyson's technique; Alyson did not purge Marion's catheter first, which falsified hers analysis. Alyson becomes distraught and returns home. Arben lies to Muriel: claiming he does not have Yves's findings. Arben and Chloé resolve to say nothing about Alyson's sampling. Florence wakes up crying; she has kidney pain. Arben speaks to Albanian authorities for his diploma. Fred discharged from the ward. Alyson confesses to Hugo about her sampling error. Arben and Hugo check Florence's ultrasound: she's pregnant and transferred to obstetrics. Jean deduces that Augustin has long-term latent syphilis. Alyson wants to tell authorities but Chloé's against it as this puts the ward at risk. In the carpark, Chloé slumps in her car.
7	7	"Episode 7"	Thomas Lilti	Thomas Lilti, Anaïs Carpita, Claude Le Pape, Julien Lilti	7 January 2019
Passerby and Alyson break into Chloé's car. Alyson starts CPR, ED team arrive and discover Chloé's operation scar. Chloé's taken into ED with Alyson continuing CPR. Florence requests Hugo accompany her to Obstetrics; her child has fetal distress. Alyson's swapped out for CPR; Chloé's defibrillated. Alyson alerts Arben, neither knew of Chloé's heart condition. Florence's baby's not breathing. Chloé's heart resumes beating. Muriel arrives but cannot reach Manuel. Muriel sends Alyson and Hugo to Chloé's home. Muriel determines Chloé had aortic valve replacement. Chloé developed blood clot, which disrupted her valve; may require further surgery. Manuel arrives at ICU. Alyson and Hugo collect Chloé's documents; learning about Chloé's condition, sick leave and being Manuel's partner. Muriel finds that Manuel already knew but about Chloé's condition. Hugo sees Florence's baby's breathing but weak. Lazare tells Alyson about Hugo leaving Marion's cabinet open. Muriel tests Chloé before operating; they find another clot. Hugo tells Florence her baby's fine. Manuel authorises chemical breakdown of Chloé's clots, reducing them. Arben and Hugo dine together. Alyson describes reviving Chloé to Samir. Hugo records Florence's favourite song to soothe her baby. Martine asks Alyson, Arben and Hugo to return to their ward. Chloé wakes.
8	8	"Episode 8"	Thomas Lilti	Thomas Lilti, Anaïs Carpita, Claude Le Pape, Julien Lilti	14 January 2019
Chloé's scan shows she has frontal lobe disorder. Muriel advises cognitive tests to determine any intellectual problems and requests neurologist's analysis. Alyson, Arben and Hugo reorganise ward beds. Nathalie announces Marion's inquest by hospital's legal department. Chloé decides to be re-operated by her surgeon Massoudi. At inquest, Alyson admits her sampling error. Alyson, Arben and Hugo reaffirm they did not know of Chloé's sick leave nor her heart condition. Hospital's legal department plans to shift blame to Chloé: she could not become a doctor. Hugo checks Florence's baby: she's improving. However, Florence has left hospital. Manuel's unsurprised by inquest's outlook but focuses on Chloé's health. Muriel advises Alyson and Hugo to accept inquest's findings. Alyson, Argen and Hugo cannot allow Chloé to be scapegoat. They decide to inform Marion's parents of hospital's responsibility for their daughter's death. They first show their letter to Chloé, who co-signs it. Samir breaks up with Alyson. Hugo suggests naming Florence's baby: Camille. Quarantine has been lifted. Jean farewells Alyson and Arben. Arben returns to pathology pending his tenure and transfer request. Nathalie discovers that Arben never finished his doctorate in Albania. Chloé's transferred out. Marion's parents and lawyer arrives.

=== Season two ===
No. overall	No. in season	Title	Directed by	Written by	Original release date
9	1	"Episode 1"	Thomas Lilti	Thomas Lilti, Anaïs Carpita, Claude Le Pape, Julien Lilti	5 April 2021
Igor stitches man's eyebrow gash; room starts flooding. Frozen pipe has burst; Larouchi orders evacuation to Internal Medicine. Alyson and Hugo attempt to find room for ED patient influx. Igor and Olivier briskly attend patient, nearby Alyson. Olivier re-assigns Chloé, Alyson and Hugo to attend ED patients with Cohen's approval. Igor introduces interns to Fred and ED's priority system. Chloé attends her first patient in months: pierces thumbnail to relieve swelling. Olivier has Alyson assist inserting a tube into a woman's throat to relieve her respiratory distress. She is stabilised. Igor and Hugo are called-in from cafeteria. Chloé treats a kidney stone patient. Olivier advises Alyson to be more independent. When Alyson's patient has a low heart rate, Olivier wants them shifted to ICU but they are too full. Alyson brings in Chloé, who suggests blood thinner. Olivier and Alyson alternate CPR, while Fabrice administers medication. Hugo treats an exposed shinbone fracture. Igor takes over when Hugo becomes overwhelmed. Olivier acknowledges Hugo's good work on patients' casts. Numerous ambulances roll into hospital carpark, containing 40 carbon monoxide poisoning victims. Olivier orders all staff to immediately assemble in the carpark. Arben, driving an ambulance, hides from his former teammates.
10	2	"Episode 2"	Thomas Lilti	Thomas Lilti, Anaïs Carpita, Claude Le Pape, Julien Lilti	5 April 2021
Lazare informs Hugo of Arben's presence. Olivier emphasises all medics to correctly prioritise cases. Alyson works alongside Arben. She takes her patient Andrea, up to ward. Only three patients can access high pressure chamber at a time. Olivier's protocols determine which ones enter first. Andrea must wait for second batch. Arben has slight poisoning; he wears an oxygen mask. Olivier orders Hugo into chamber with first three patients. Arben becomes anxious upon return to Internal Medicine. Chloé and Olivier monitor various patients on oxygen. Muriel and Stéphanie control chamber's conditions. Hugo and patients are inside. Olivier justifies use of priority system despite Alyson's desperate plea on behalf of Andrea. Olivier advises Alyson to keep objective. Muriel returns to ICU duties. Hugo applies masks to patients; one patient's poorly sedated and starts fitting. Hugo has no syringes to sedate him. Stéphanie scrambles to find one. After the sedative, the patient calms but requires re-intubation. Chamber's de-pressurised, Muriel intubates patient before return to chamber. Alyson's worried by delay's effect on Andrea. Arben removes his mask and tubes but collapses. Olivier sternly orders Alyson to calm down. Alyson wheels Andrea into chamber, Igor exchanges with Hugo. Arben wakes in bed with Chloé monitoring him.
11	3	"Episode 3"	Thomas Lilti	Thomas Lilti, Anaïs Carpita, Claude Le Pape, Julien Lilti	5 April 2021
Chloé, Alyson and Hugo greet Arben, who says he left for a personal problem. Screening of carbon monoxide victims finishes. Olivier estimates ED remains with Internal Medicine for another week. Olivier and Muriel assign Hugo to triage with Fred. Hugo sorts files into priority categories. Arben's moved to recovery room. Neither Chloé nor Alyson know why Arben left. Alyson assists Igor with traffic accident patient. Igor holds patient's chest wound closed; Alyson cuts patient's chest to relieve lung pressure. Chloé sees Arben sitting beside homeless patients. Hugo's patient requires psychiatrist but none are available. Igor reorganises roster to reduce Alyson overworking. Hugo's patients become restless; Fred asks Hugo to speed up. Chloé diagnoses woman with flu. Chloé asks Hugo to transfer woman's baby, James, to pediatrics. Hugo hands James to Arben. Despite readings returning to normal Arben stays for James. Arben takes James back to Hugo; baby may have measles. Kim and Anna attend James. Alyson's enthusiastic to join ED but Olivier cautions her not to make hasty decisions. Patients squabble at reception. Arben informs Chloé of James's status; his mother has measles, too. A violent patient attacks Alyson and others. Arben chats with homeless man, Bernard. Arben discovers patient in Fred's isolation room.
12	4	"Episode 4"	Thomas Lilti	Thomas Lilti, Anaïs Carpita, Claude Le Pape, Julien Lilti	5 April 2021
Alyson crawls into room, discovers middle-aged woman Josiane. They call for Olivier, who stabilises her. Hugo remembers Josiane from the morning. Josiane's transferred to ICU. Olivier tries to find out more about Josiane from Hugo, Arben and Chloé. Arben collects supplies to treat Bernard. Olivier's displeased by staff's poor handling of patients' files. Martine finds Josiane's file. Muriel checks that Chloé's had no blackouts. Arben asks Chloé to assist with Bernard. Nathalie asks ED staff about Josiane. Olivier takes responsibility, Martine describes problems processing ED patients. Nathalie promises tmore staff, CCTVs and computers to address these problems. Hugo still takes too long per patient. Chloé returns with Bernard's results; Arben suggests antibiotics. Arben cautions Bernard that his necrotic toes will be removed. Alyson's patient has throat lump; at radiology Alyson tells Louise that Saïd sent her. Patient has infected inflammation and cellulitis. Louise books surgery for Alyson's patient. Doctor arrives for Bernard, concerned by Chloé's absence he asks Olivier to attend as Arben provides rundown of Bernard's symptoms and treatment. Olivier queries Arben, who explains he's paramedic for Order of Malta; no longer a doctor. Chloé confirms Bernard's antibiotics to Laura. Neuville queries Josiane's scan authorised by Igor.
13	5	"Episode 5"	Thomas Lilti	Thomas Lilti, Anaïs Carpita, Claude Le Pape, Julien Lilti	5 April 2021
Hugo takes phone to Olivier who attends wounded man. Neuville updates Olivier on Josiane's scan. Hugo informs Olivier that Igor's gone to surgery with a patient. Hugo finishes stitching another patient so Saïd can replace Olivier. Football coach wants his queasy players tested and treated prior to plane flight. Players start vomiting; Alyson and Chloé ask coach for their menus. Olivier requests Hugo collect Igor's files since ED shifted to Internal Medicine. Test results confirm that the players have food poisoning; their flight and game is cancelled. Olivier starts reviewing his patients' files with Igor. While Saïd supervises, Igor distributes his remaining active cases to Alyson or Chloé. Olivier explains to Hugo that Igor's memory lapses were probably due to poor sleep. Olivier asks Arben to join ED's night shift to replace Igor. Olivier learns his interns already worked with Arben. Arben monitors footballers. He tells Alyson to catch up on sleep. Chloé attends fight victim, Joachim, who has a lung infection. Arben has footballer, Yanis tested for muscle weakness against Olivier's instructions. Joachim kisses Chloé. Hugo push starts Igor's car. Nathalie tells Arben to go home but he refuses. Igor drives Hugo in his car in circles around carpark.
14	6	"Episode 6"	Thomas Lilti	Thomas Lilti, Anaïs Carpita, Claude Le Pape, Julien Lilti	5 April 2021
Hugo takes over when Igor asks for assistance with fitting patient Cyril. Igor has lost his confidence, become short-tempered. Hugo advises him to notify Olivier. Olivier and Saïd preview staff duties. Alyson discovers that Olivier's rabbit's missing. Hugo and Igor discuss Cyril's pain management with analgesics not working. Chloé suggests hypnotherapy or ICU drugs. Olivier asks Arben why he's treating Yanis for muscle weakness. Arben verifies his diagnosis and Yves determines its severity. Yves was concerned for Arben's unexplained absence. Muriel advises restraints for Cyril as ICU drugs are for emergencies. Yanis's distraught due to Arben's diagnosis. Cyril's fitting prevents his scans. Josiane's stabilised with brain hemorrhage. Joachim found collapsed in corridor; he shuns Chloé discovering his urination. While examining Joachim, Arben notices crack cocaine signs. Chloé castigates herself for not realising. Arben advises Yanis hide his condition and maintain his career. Cyril fits and injures himself. Hugo brings Muriel to see Cyril; she prescribes sedatives. Alyson captures Olivier's rabbit. Hugo stitches Cyril's wounds. Alyson apprises Olivier of rabbit's injury. Chloé notices Joachim's fractures; he lied about epilepsy. Nathalie tells Arben he cannot practice medicine without qualifications. Alyson agrees to Olivier changing her internship to ED. Hugo observes Alyson and Lazare leave cafeteria.
15	7	"Episode 7"	Thomas Lilti	Thomas Lilti, Anaïs Carpita, Claude Le Pape, Julien Lilti	5 April 2021
Chloé attends woman, Ella, with lower back pain, bleeding urine. Chloé recommends further tests. Ella believes she's growing wings. Muriel directs Chloé to Human Resources for interview. Nathalie refuses to reinstate Arben with his fake document. Hugo attends Massan, Arabic speaking, chemical burns victim. Massan's foreman, as translator, claims his hand's wound caused by caustic soda. Arben has Chloé demonstrate treating wound on patient claiming dog bit him. Chloé: bite does not match dog's teeth. Hugo discovers Massan's wounds extend across his chest. Olivier recommends Arben assist Hugo. Arben cuts away Massan's shirt; obtains burns unit's advice. Alyson helps Arben. Igor's late for work. Alyson understands Massan's mumbling. Chloé enlightens Ella to her kidney infection; recommends psychiatrist for her wings. Lavare speaks to Massan, who's afraid of losing his job. Arben describes burns inconsistent with soda but foreman maintains his claim. Chloé refuses Human Resources' redeploying to administrative duties. Chloé advises Hugo to cover for Igor's absence. After Chloé explains, psychiatrist speaks with Ella. Hugo explains Igor's problems to Olivier. Massan has cardiac problems. Chloé confirms Massan's not soda burns. Foreman's left hospital. Alyson tells Hugo about switching internship to ED. Hugo finds Igor collapsed inside pressure chamber; starts CPR.
16	8	"Episode 8"	Thomas Lilti	Thomas Lilti, Anaïs Carpita, Claude Le Pape, Julien Lilti	5 April 2021
Chloé brings Massan to Fabrice in ICU; they are called to pressure chamber. Chloé takes command, issuing instructions to Fabrice and Nadi on CPR, while querying Hugo about Igor. They get Igor's heart started, he's moved to ward. Muriel directs Nadi to use defibrillator on Igor. Arben and Chloé suspect its attempted suicide. Lazare informs interns that Igor's heart's beating. Muriel sends them back to ED. Olivier calls ward staff meeting; he's closing ED to new admissions. Olivier asks Chloé's opinion about Igor; she believes Igor will be adversely affected. Alyson and Hugo return to residences to sleep. Chloé and Arben check computer search histories. Chloé tests Igor's reflexes and brain activity. Staff await news of Igor's condition. Chloé explains Igor's chloroquine overdose to Muriel. Hospital CEO outlines response to Igor's collapse. Chloé tells Alyson that Igor's likely to die. Arben informs Chloé he wants to practice medicine. Igor has died. Hugo reads Igor's suicide note on residence wall; he despairs of being good enough. COVID-19 pandemic Hugo works at GP clinic and hospital. Chloé's in ICU and Alyson in ED. Manuel returns to look after hospital's infected geriatrics. Arben's documentation is now up-to-date; he asks Olivier to help in ED.
