= Insecure (film) =

- Film poster
- Directed by: Marianne Tardieu
- Written by: Nadine Lamari; Marianne Tardieu
- Produced by: Christophe Delsaux; Céline Maugis
- Starring: Reda Kateb; Adèle Exarchopoulos; Rashid Debbouze
- Cinematography: Jordane Chouzenoux
- Edited by: Thomas Marchand
- Music by: Sayem
- Production companies: La Vie est Belle Films Associés; Oriflamme Films
- Distributed by: Rézo Films
- Release dates: 16 May 2014 (Cannes); 12 November 2014 (France)
- Running time: 83 minutes
- Country: France
- Language: French

Insecure (French: Qui vive) is a 2014 French drama film directed by Marianne Tardieu. It was screened in the ACID section at the 2014 Cannes Film Festival.

== Cast ==
- Reda Kateb as Chérif Arezki
- Adèle Exarchopoulos as Jenny
- Rashid Debbouze as Dedah
- Moussa Mansaly as Abdou
- Serge Renko as Claude Gilles
- Alexis Loret as L'enquêteur
- Hassan N'Dibona as Djim
- Mohamed Mouloudi as Walid
- Guillaume Verdier as Fred
- Medanie Boussaïd as Sami
