= Brocéliande (film) =

- Official teaser poster
- Directed by: Doug Headline
- Written by: Benoît Lestang; Doug Headline
- Produced by: Éric Névé
- Starring: André Wilms; Alice Taglioni; Alexis Loret
- Cinematography: Guillaume Schiffman
- Edited by: Sébastien Prangère
- Music by: Sarry Long
- Production companies: Canal+ Gimages 6 Gimages Développement; La Chauve Souris; Natexis Banques Populaires Images 3 Pathé Renn Production; Pathé; TF1 Films Production
- Distributed by: Pathé
- Release date: 8 January 2003
- Running time: 95 minutes
- Country: France
- Language: French
- Box office: $1.1 million

Brocéliande is a French horror film written by Doug Headline and Benoît Lestang, directed by Doug Headline, and starring André Wilms, Alice Taglioni and Alexis Loret.

== Plot ==
Chloe Severin, a student of archaeology in the first semester, is participating in an excavation under the direction of Professor Vernet. According to legend, the heavily wooded location, Brocéliande, is the burial site of King Arthur and the wizard Merlin. Soon after their arrival, a series of mysterious murders begins to thin the ranks of the participants, all victims brandishing wounds from Druids sickles. Upon pursuing the mystery and the excavation, Chloe encounters a very lively pagan cult and its horned priest.

== Cast ==
- Elsa Kikoïne as Chloé Severin
- Cylia Malki as Iris
- Alice Taglioni as Léa
- Mathieu Simonet as Erwann
- Cédric Chevalme as Gilles
- Alexis Loret as Thomas
- André Wilms as Vernet
- Vernon Dobtcheff as Brennos
- Edwin Kruger as Druid
- Thierry Nzeutem as Morregane

== Release ==
The film premiered on 2 November 2002 as part of the Semana de Cine Fantástico y de Terror de San Sebastián and was released in French cinemas on 8 January 2003.

== Soundtrack ==
The soundtrack was composed by French musician Sarry Long.
