= Roman de Gare =

- Directed by: Claude Lelouch
- Written by: Claude Lelouch; Pierre Uytterhoeven
- Produced by: Claude Lelouch
- Starring: Dominique Pinon; Fanny Ardant; Audrey Dana; Zinedine Soualem; Myriam Boyer; Michèle Bernier
- Cinematography: Gerard de Battista
- Edited by: Jean Gargonne; Stephane Mazalaigue
- Music by: Gilbert Becaud; Alex Jaffray
- Distributed by: Samuel Goldwyn Company (U.S.)
- Release dates: 27 June 2007 (France); 18 April 2008 (United States)
- Running time: 103 min.
- Country: France
- Box office: $4,826,734

Crossed Tracks (French: Roman de gare) is a 2007 French film directed by Claude Lelouch (who appears in credits as Hervé Picard). The film follows a novelist, her ghost writer, and a wayward young woman as a chance encounter at a rest stop interrupts the delicate balance of their lives. French actor Dominique Pinon received wide praise for his rare turn as the film's leading man.

The title is French slang for "trashy novel one reads in a train or train station" similar to the English phrase "airport novel".

== Plot ==
As the movie opens, a woman writer with a recently bestselling novel is being questioned about a murder. The story cuts to a young woman abandoned by her traveling companion at a roadside rest stop. A helpful man offers to give her a ride.

The story turns on a series of mysterious identities. There is an escaped rapist-killer with a penchant for magic tricks. There is a man who has abandoned his family. And there is a writer's assistant. Which of these three is the helpful stranger?

He is especially suspicious as he begins secretly dictating into a recorder a story about a woman in danger. The man and woman travel from the rest stop to her parents’ home, where her daughter is also living. (The woman herself lives in Paris and claims to be a hairdresser.) The man bonds with the daughter and disappears with her for several hours...

By the end of the movie, the plot threads come together and the audience identifies each of the three mysterious characters, as well as the role of the woman writer.

== Cast ==
- Dominique Pinon : Pierre Laclos / Louis
- Fanny Ardant : Judith Ralitzer
- Audrey Dana : Huguette
- Michèle Bernier : Florence
- Myriam Boyer : Huguette's mother
- Zinedine Soualem : Commissaire Leroux

== Publicity ==
During the film's production, the press was duped into thinking that a new young filmmaker named Hervé Picard was making the project as his debut film. Initial screenings ran without credits and perpetuated the hoax. It was only on the eve of its Cannes debut that Lelouch took credit for directing the film, and revealed that the aforementioned Picard was merely his tennis coach. Having suffered bad reviews on a few films released previous to this, Lelouch wanted to see if his film would get a more positive greeting from critics if they did not think he had made it. The deception also mirrored one of the film's key story hooks, which involved one person taking public credit for another's writing, under the belief the actual creator would not be as well received. Critics also noted that in the 1947 Henri-Georges Clouzot film Quai des Orfèvres, the investigating detective is named Antoine Picard, and a crucial plot reveal takes place in a building clearly labeled "Quai des Orfèvres."

== Reception ==
Roman de Gare was released in the United States in April 2008 to positive reviews, earning an 87% rating on the review website Rotten Tomatoes.
