= Verderonne =

- Commune
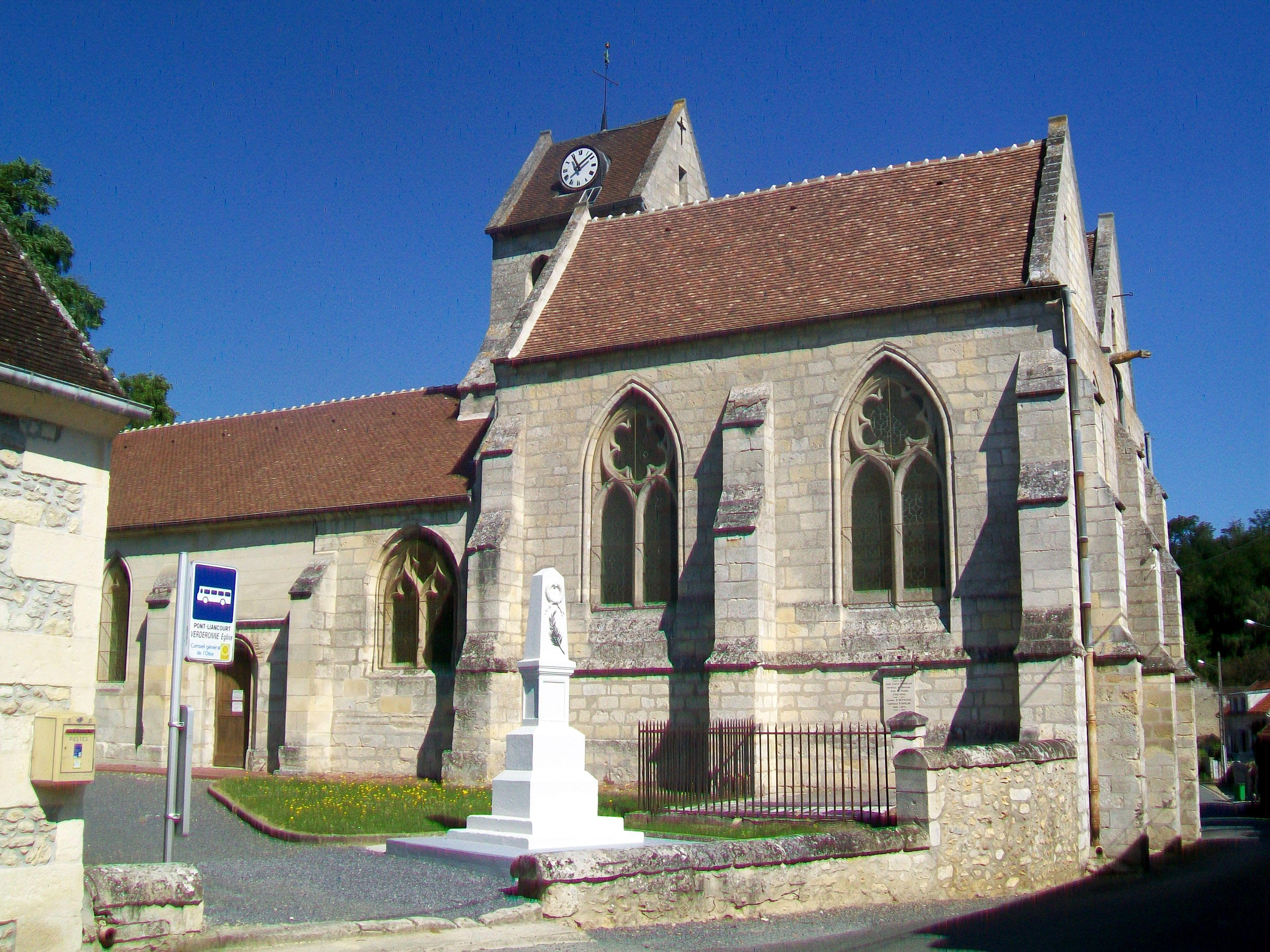
- The church in Verderonne
- Location of Verderonne
- Location within France Location within Hauts-de-France
- Coordinates: 49°19′48″N 2°29′57″E
- Country: France
- Region: Hauts-de-France
- Department: Oise
- Arrondissement: Clermont
- Canton: Clermont
- Intercommunality: Liancourtois

Government
  - Mayor (2020–2026): Philippe Lepori
- Area^{1}: 3.33 km^{2} (1.29 sq mi)
- Highest elevation: 138 m (453 ft)
- Lowest elevation: 48 m (157 ft)
- Population (2023): 483
  - Density: 145/km^{2} (376/sq mi)
- Time zone: UTC+01:00 (CET)
  - Summer (DST): UTC+02:00 (CEST)
- INSEE/Postal code: 60669 /60140
- ^{1} French Land Register data, which excludes lakes, ponds, glaciers > 1 km^{2} (0.386 sq mi or 247 acres) and river estuaries.

Verderonne (French pronunciation: [vɛʁdəʁɔn]) is a commune in the Oise department in northern France.

== See also ==
- Communes of the Oise department
