= Julie Bertuccelli =

French film director

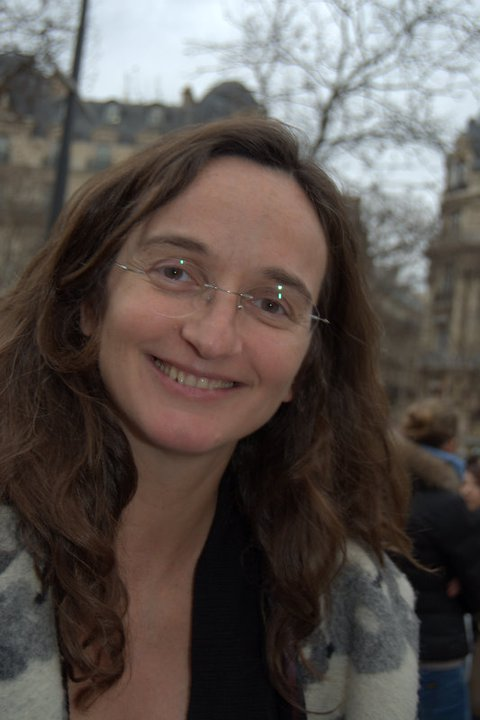
Julie Bertuccelli.

Julie Mathilde Charlotte Claire Bertuccelli is a French director born February 12, 1968, in Boulogne-Billancourt.

She is particularly known for her documentary La Cour de Babel released in 2014 and the feature film L'Arbre released in 2010.

== Biography ==
After studies in hypokhâgne, then khâgne, and a master of philosophy, Julie Bertuccelli became, for ten years, assistant director on many feature films, TV movies and short films with Otar Iosseliani, Rithy Panh, Krzysztof Kieślowski, Emmanuel Finkiel, Bertrand Tavernier, Jean-Louis Bertuccelli, Christian de Chalonge, René Féret, and Pierre Étaix.

Following an introduction to documentary filmmaking in 1993 at Ateliers Varan, she directed fifteen documentaries for Arte, France 3 and France 5, including Une Liberté!, La Fabrique des Judges, Welcome to the Department Store, A World in Fusion, Otar Iosseliani, the Whistling Blackbird, The Glasberg Mystery, Antoinette Fouque, What is a Woman?, among others.

Her first feature film Since Otar Left has been crowned by twenty awards in France and abroad, including the Grand Prize of the Critics' Week at the 2003 Cannes Film Festival, the César de la meilleur first work in 2004, the Marguerite Duras Prize 2003 and the Michel d'Ornano Award 2003 in Deauville.

L'Arbre is her second feature film. It was nominated for three Césars.

Her documentary The Court of Babel, released in theaters in March 2014, has been selected in several festivals, including those of New York, Rome, Abu Dhabi, Sheffield, Rio, Montreal, Tokyo, Cairo, and San Francisco.

Her documentary Latest News from the Cosmos (November 2016), received the Audience Award from the Rencontres du Cinéma Documentaire in Montreuil and the FIFA Grand Prix in Montreal (2018).

Her last feature film, Claire Darling with Catherine Deneuve and Chiara Mastroianni, released in French theaters in February 2019 Claire Darling grossed $0 in North America and a total worldwide of $1 million. With 85 000 spectators in France, the film is a heavy public failure.

Julie Bertuccelli has chaired the Société Civile des Auteurs Multimédia (SCAM) since June 2017, having been the first woman elected to this position in 2013, as well as the brand new Cinematheque of the documentary she created with SCAM (with which she also created the Eye of 'Or, the Documentary Prize at the Cannes Film Festival in 2015). She was co-chair with Michel Hazanavicius of the Civil Society of Producers' Authors Producers (ARP) in 2016.

She is the daughter of the director Jean-Louis Bertuccelli and the widow of cinematographer Christophe Pollock.

== Filmography ==
=== Director ===
==== Documentaries ====
- 1993: Un métier comme un autre
- 1994: Une liberté !
- 1995: Un dimanche en champagne
- 1995: Le Jongleur de Notre-Dame
- 1996: Trait d'union
- 1996: Saint-Denis, les couleurs de la ville
- 1997: La Fabrique des juges
- 1999: Bienvenue au grand magasin
- 2000: Les Îles éoliennes (coll. Voyages, Voyages)
- 2006: Un monde en fusion
- 2006: Otar Iosseliani, le merle siffleur (Coll. Cinéastes de notre temps)
- 2007: Stage Les chantiers nomades: l'acteur concret au cinéma, autour des objets
- 2008: Le Mystère Glasberg
- 2008: Antoinette Fouque, qu'est-ce qu'une femme (Coll. Empreintes)
- 2014: La Cour de Babel
- 2016: Dernières nouvelles du cosmos

==== Feature films ====
- 2003: Depuis qu'Otar est parti…
- 2010: L'Arbre
- 2018: Claire Darling

=== Scriptwriter ===
- 2002: Depuis qu'Otar est parti…
- 2010: L'Arbre
- 2018: Claire Darling

=== Assistant director ===
- 1988–1990: Divers série: Salut les homards, Les six compagnons, Souris noire from Pierre Étaix
- 1990: Aujourd'hui peut-être from Jean-Louis Bertuccelli
- 1990: Kaminsky, un flic à Moscou from Stéphane Kurc
- 1991: Promenades d'été from René Féret
- 1991: La Chasse aux papillons from Otar Iosseliani
- 1992: Precheur en eau trouble from Georges Lautner
- 1992: Trois couleurs: Bleu from Krzysztof Kieślowski
- 1992: Trois couleurs: Blanc from Krzysztof Kieślowski
- 1993: Les Dessous du Moulin Rouge from Nils Tavernier
- 1994: Le Clandestin from Jean-Louis Bertuccelli
- 1994: Madame Jacques sur la Croisette from Emmanuel Finkiel
- 1995: The Bait (L'Appât) from Bertrand Tavernier
- 1995: Le Bel Été 1914 from Christian de Chalonge
- 1996: Brigands, chapitre VII from Otar Iosseliani
- 1997: Un soir après la guerre from Rithy Panh

== See also ==
- List of female film and television directors
