= Audrey Dana =

French actress and film director (born 1977)

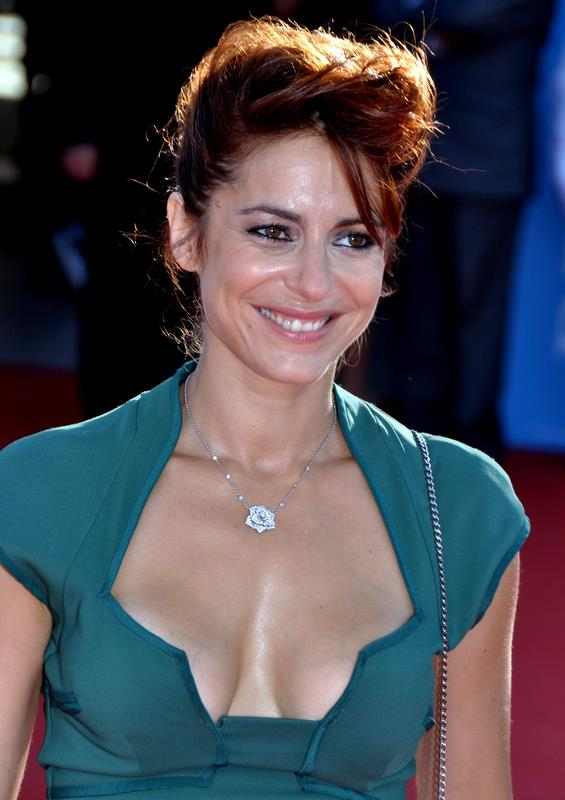
- Dana in 2012
- Born: 21 September 1977 (age 49); Rueil-Malmaison, France
- Occupations: Actress, film director, screenwriter
- Spouse: Olivier Delbosc (m. 2015)
- Website: www.AudreyDana.com

Audrey Dana (born 21 September 1977) is a French actress and film director.

== Life and career ==
Dana studied drama in Orléans and Paris. After two years in New York City, she went back to France where she acted in various plays, including Nos amis, les humains by Bernard Werber. She was also cast in the movie adaptations Nos amis les Terriens, and Roman de Gare by Claude Lelouch. In 2008, she was nominated for the César Award for Most Promising Actress and was awarded the Prix Romy Schneider. Dana and her ex-husband, French film director Mabrouk El Mechri, have a son Lee who was born in 2008. She is also the mother of Lucca Coulon-Dana, born in 2000, from a previous union, who plays in her film, Sous les jupes des filles.

Her directorial debut French Women was released on 4 June 2014.

== Filmography ==
=== As actress ===
- Le Faucon by Paul Boujenah (1983)
- Slices of Life by François Leterrier (1985)
- Joséphine, ange gardien TV Series (1 Episode : "Un passé pour l'avenir") (2006)
- Our Earthmen Friends by Bernard Werber (2006)
- Roman de gare by Claude Lelouch (2007)
- The Cinema Around the Corner (in the anthology To Each His Own Cinema), short film by Claude Lelouch (2007)
- Ce soir je dors chez toi by Olivier Baroux (2007)
- Ah! La libido by Michèle Rosier (2009)
- Welcome by Philippe Lioret (2009)
- La différence, c'est que c'est pas pareil by Pascal Laëthier (2009)
- Tellement proches by Éric Toledano and Olivier Nakache (2009)
- Nous trois de Renaud Bertrand (2010)
- 600 kilos d'or pur by Éric Besnard (2010)
- The Clink of Ice by Bertrand Blier (2010)
- What War May Bring by Claude Lelouch (2010)
- Torpedo by Matthieu Donck (2012)
- Le Secret de l'enfant fourmi by Christine François (2012)
- Les Jeux des nuages et de la pluie by Benjamin de Lajarte (2013)
- Denis by Lionel Bailliu (2013)
- Paris Follies by Marc Fitoussi (2014)
- French Women by Audrey Dana (2014)
- Boomerang by François Favrat (2015)
- French Cuisine by Florent Siri (2015)
- If I Were a Boy by Audrey Dana (2017)
- The Midwife by Martin Provost (2017)
- Knock by Lorraine Lévy (2017)
- Heavy Duty by Bertrand Blier (2019)
- La Vérité si je mens ! Les débuts by Michel Munz and Gérard Bitton (2019)
- Profession du père by Jean-Pierre Améris (2020)
- The Accusation by Yvan Attal (2021)
- Soul Mates by André Téchiné (2023)

=== As director ===
- 5 à 7 (Short film) (2009)
- French Women (2014)
- If I Were a Boy (2017)
- Hommes au bord de la crise de nerfs (2022)
