= List of French films of 1993 =

A list of films produced in France in 1993.

Title	Director	Cast	Genre	Notes
L'Arbre, le maire et la médiathèque	Éric Rohmer		Comedy	1 win
François Truffaut: Stolen Portraits	Michel Pascal, Serge Toubiana		Documentary	Screened at the 1993 Cannes Film Festival
Germinal		Gérard Depardieu	Epic	Based on Émile Zola novel set in nineteenth century
Le Jeune Werther	Jacques Doillon			Entered into the 43rd Berlin International Film Festival
Libera me	Alain Cavalier			Entered into the 1993 Cannes Film Festival
Louis, the Child King	Roger Planchon			Entered into the 1993 Cannes Film Festival
The Little Apocalypse	Costa-Gavras			Entered into the 43rd Berlin International Film Festival
Mazeppa	Bartabas			Entered into the 1993 Cannes Film Festival
Me Ivan, You Abraham	Yolande Zauberman			Won the Golden St. George at Moscow
Opera Imaginaire	José Abel, Hilary Audus	Ana Lucia Alves, Sébastien Chollet, Alain de Greffe	Animated musical	Made for TV
The Scent of Green Papaya	Tran Anh Hung	Tran Nu Yên-Khê	Drama	
Smoking/No Smoking	Alain Resnais	Sabine Azéma, Pierre Arditi	Comedy	8 wins & 6 nominations
Three Colors: Blue	Krzysztof Kieślowski	Juliette Binoche	Drama / Music	Nomin. for 3 Golden Globes, +13 wins, +6 nom.
Vent d'est	Robert Enrico	Malcolm McDowell, Pierre Vaneck, Jean-François Balmer	Drama	
Les Visiteurs	Jean-Marie Poiré	Jean Reno, Christian Clavier	Fantasy / Comedy	1 win & 8 nominations
The Young Girls Turn 25	Agnès Varda			Screened at the 1993 Cannes Film Festival
