= Jocelyn Quivrin =

French actor (1979–2009)

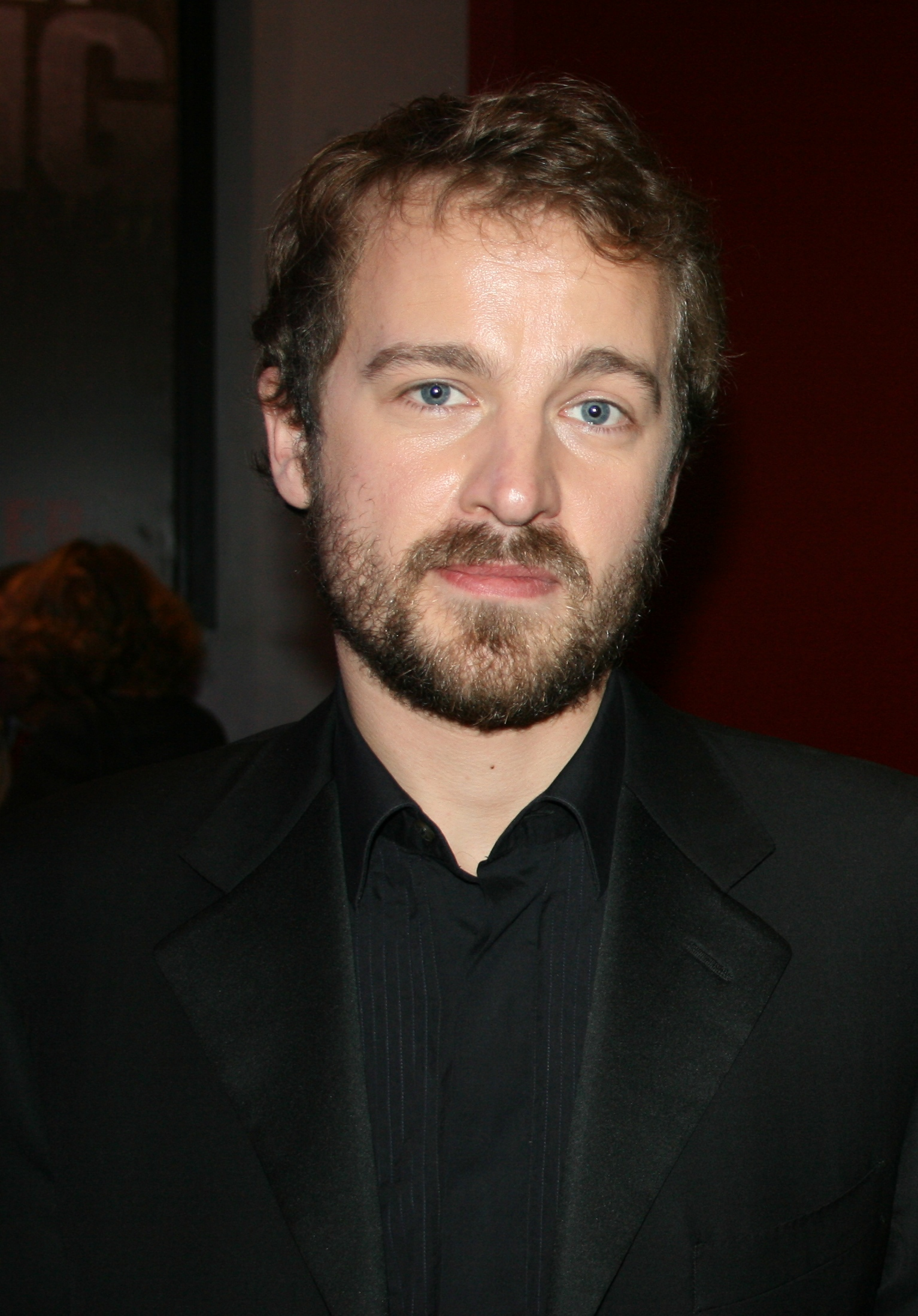
- Quivrin in Paris in February 2008
- Born: 14 February 1979; Dijon, Côte-d'Or, France
- Died: 15 November 2009 (aged 30); Saint-Cloud, Hauts-de-Seine, France
- Occupation: Actor
- Partner: Alice Taglioni (2003–2009)
- Children: Charlie

Jocelyn Quivrin (14 February 1979 – 15 November 2009) was a French actor. He had a supporting role in the film Syriana.

== Early life ==
Jocelyn Quivrin was born in Dijon on 14 February 1979. His father, Vincent Beaufils, was an anaesthetist for SAMU (a mobile accident unit).

Quivrin studied film and broadcasting at Hector Berlioz college in Vincennes, before obtaining his Baccalaureat in literature and taking a course in film studies at Nanterre University. However, he soon gave up his studies in favour of launching his professional career. He spent several months at the 'Ecole des Enfants Terribles' drama school and took some further education courses. In spite of this, he always considered himself as having been self-taught.

== Career ==
Quivrin's film debut came at a young age, when he played the Duke of Anjou, one of the main characters, in Roger Planchon's Louis, enfant roi (1992). The film was selected for the 1993 Cannes Festival, where Quivrin was introduced to his first agent. He appeared in several costume dramas, including Lautrec by Roger Planchon and Daniel Vigne's L'enfant des lumières in 2002, opposite Nathalie Baye. He also played the Count of Nansac in Jacquou le crocant, a film by Laurent Boutonnat, set in the nineteenth century. In 2007 he played the young Louis IX in Jean de la fontaine, le defi.

Quivrin then appeared in L'Outremangeur and in Grande Ecole. In 2005 he landed the part of Detective Nerteaux in the big-budget film L'empire des loups alongside Jean Reno. It was a huge commercial success and boosted Quivrin's career.

Quivrin made his first television appearance as Babar in Les compagnons de l'aventure: Lola et les sardines, which featured a group of children on holiday in the 1990s.

In 2001 he gained a certain notoriety in the eyes of the French public, playing the title role in Rastignac ou les ambitieux, Alain Tasma's TV adaptation of the novel by Honoré de Balzac. Quivrin's performance was highly acclaimed and the newspapers were full of praise. Le Figaro called him “flamboyant” while Le Monde found him “extremely seductive”. He consequently received the award for Best Actor at the Television film festival in Luchon.

At the same time as pursuing his career in television and film, Quivrin was also acting on stage. In 2003 he played Lord Darlington in Lady Windermere's Fan by Oscar Wilde, along with Caroline Cellier and Melanie Doutey, directed by François-Louis Tilly. He appeared at the 2008 Avignon Festival in Do you love me? a play by Redjep Mitrovistas.

Quivrin had supporting roles in two internationally successful, Oscar-winning films: Elizabeth (1998) and Syriana (2005). In 99 francs, Jan Kounen's adaptation of the eponymous novel by Frédéric Beigbeder, Quivrin tackled his first comedy role. He played the colleague of Jean Dujardin, an arrogant, depressive advertising executive. His performance was deemed “excellent” by Le Monde and earned him the Lumière Award for Most Promising Male Newcomer, the Patrick Dewaere prize and a César nomination for Most Promising Male Newcomer in 2008.

In 2006, Quivrin wrote and directed a short film entitled Acteur, which was intended to be both anecdotal and representative of the life of an actor. The film is centred on a conversation between a female director and an auditioning actor and, according to Quivrin, deals with “the clear separation you have to make between your personal and professional lives”. The character of the director, played by Nathalie Baye, was inspired by Catherine Breillat, whom he had met at several auditions.

In 2007, he played "The Nansac's Count" in the film Jacquou Le Croquant, realised by Laurent Boutonnat.

In 2008, Quivrin appeared in the film LOL with Sophie Marceau, Christa Theret and Jérémy Kapone and, a year later, in À l'aventure by Jean-Claude Brisseau and Incognito with the singer Bénabar and the actor Franck Dubosc. Quivrin's penultimate film, La famille Wolberg was released in France in December 2009. His final film, Ensemble, c'est trop by Léa Fazer, was released in France in February 2010.

=== Death ===
Quivrin died in a car accident on Autoroute A13 on the evening of Sunday 15 November 2009. He had lost control of his Ariel Atom (a small but powerful open-topped, two-seater car) at the entrance of the Saint-Cloud tunnel. The speedometer was found stopped at 230 km/h (143 mph), although it is not known whether he was actually driving at this speed or it was a consequence of the violent impact. French television and newspapers have reported that the road was wet from rain at the time of the accident.

His funeral took place on 21 November 2009 at the Reformed church on the Avenue de la Grande-Armée in Paris. It was attended by Quivrin's close family and friends, as well as by many stars of stage and screen.

Quivrin was buried at the Père-Lachaise cemetery in Paris.

== Personal life ==
He met his partner, Alice Taglioni, during the filming of Grande École. Their son, Charlie, was born in March 2009.

== Selected filmography ==
- Louis, the Child King (1993)
- Clément (2001)
- Syriana (2005)
- Jacquou Le Croquant (2007)
- 99 Francs (2007)
- Incognito (2009)
- LOL (Laughing Out Loud) (2008)
- Maestro (2014) - original concept, screenplay
