= 1993 Cannes Film Festival =

- Official poster of the 46th Cannes Film Festival, featuring still of Cary Grant and Ingrid Bergman from Alfred Hitchcock's Notorious.
- Opening film: My Favorite Season
- Closing film: Toxic Affair
- Location: Cannes, France
- Founded: 1946
- Awards: Palme d'Or: Farewell My Concubine; The Piano
- Hosted by: Jeanne Moreau
- No. of films: 23 (In Competition)
- Festival date: 13 May 1993 – 24 May 1993
- Website: festival-cannes.com/en

Cannes Film Festival
- 1994 1992

The 46th Cannes Film Festival took place from 13 to 24 May 1993. French filmmaker Louis Malle served as jury president for the main competition. French actress Jeanne Moreau hosted the opening and closing ceremonies.

The Palme d'Or was jointly award to Chinese filmmaker Chen Kaige for the drama film Farewell My Concubine and New Zealand filmmaker Jane Campion for the drama film The Piano. Campion became the first woman to ever win the festival's top prize.

The festival opened with My Favorite Season by André Téchiné, and closed with Toxic Affair by Philomène Esposito.

== Juries ==
=== Main competition ===
- Louis Malle, French filmmaker - Jury President
- Claudia Cardinale, Italian actress
- Inna Churikova, Russian actress
- Judy Davis, Australian actress
- Abbas Kiarostami, Iranian filmmaker
- Emir Kusturica, Bosnian filmmaker
- William Lubtchansky, French cinematographer
- Tom Luddy, American producer
- Gary Oldman, British actor
- Augusto M. Seabra, Portuguese film critic

=== Camera d'Or ===
- Micheline Presle, French actress - Jury President
- Gabriel Auer, French director
- Anne De Gasperi, French journalist
- Attilio D’Onofrio, Italian film critic
- Rémy Pages, French film critic
- Tony Rayns, British film critic and screenwriter
- Lia Somogyi, Hungarian film critic
- Aruna Vasudev, Indian film critic, author, editor, painter and filmmaker

== Official selection ==
=== In Competition ===
The following feature films competed for the Palme d'Or:

English title	Original title	Director(s)	Production Country
Body Snatchers		Abel Ferrara	United States
Broken Highway		Laurie McInnes	Australia
Dyuba-Dyuba	Дюба-Дюба	Aleksandr Khvan	Russia
The Escort	La scorta	Ricky Tognazzi	Italy
Falling Down		Joel Schumacher	United States
Faraway, So Close!	In weiter Ferne, so nah!	Wim Wenders	Germany
Farewell My Concubine	霸王别姬	Chen Kaige	Hong Kong
Fiorile		Paolo and Vittorio Taviani	Italy, France, Germany
Frauds		Stephan Elliott	Australia
Friends		Elaine Proctor	South Africa
King of the Hill		Steven Soderbergh	United States
Libera me		Alain Cavalier	France
Louis, the Child King	Louis, enfant roi	Roger Planchon	France
Magnificat		Pupi Avati	Italy
The Man by the Shore	L'Homme sur les quais	Raoul Peck	Haiti, France, Germany, Canada
Mazeppa		Bartabas	France
Much Ado About Nothing		Kenneth Branagh	United Kingdom, United States
My Favorite Season (opening film)	Ma saison préférée	André Téchiné	France
Naked		Mike Leigh	United Kingdom
The Piano		Jane Campion	New Zealand, Australia, France
The Puppetmaster	戲夢人生	Hou Hsiao-hsien	Taiwan
Raining Stones		Ken Loach	United Kingdom
Splitting Heirs		Robert Young	United Kingdom

=== Un Certain Regard ===
The following films were selected for Un Certain Regard section:

English title	Original title	Director(s)	Production Country
The Act in Question	El Acto en cuestión	Alejandro Agresti	Argentina
Anchoress		Chris Newby	United Kingdom
Bedevil		Tracey Moffatt	Australia
The Bird of Happiness	El Pájaro de la Felicidad	Pilar Miró	Spain
Bodies, Rest & Motion		Michael Steinberg	United States
Charlie and the Doctor		Ralph C. Parsons	France
Derailment	Avsporing	Unni Straume	Norway, France
Desperate Remedies		Stewart Main and Peter Wells	New Zealand
The End of the World	O Fim do Mundo	João Mário Grilo	Portugal
Excursion to the Bridge of Friendship		Christina Andreef	Australia
Foreboding	Şi va fi...	Valeriu Jereghi	Russia, Romania
François Truffaut: Stolen Portraits	François Truffaut: Portraits volés	Serge Toubiana and Michel Pascal	France
The Great Pumpkin	Il grande cocomero	Francesca Archibugi	Italy
Latcho Drom		Tony Gatlif	France
Moving	お引越し	Shinji Sōmai	Japan
The Music of Chance		Philip Haas	United States
October	Oktyabr	Abderrahmane Sissako	France, Mauritania
Remote Control	Sódóma Reykjavík	Óskar Jónasson	Iceland
The Scent of Green Papaya	Mùi đu đủ xanh	Tran Anh Hung	France, Vietnam
Sonatine	ソナチネ	Takeshi Kitano	Japan
Stroke		Mark Sawers	Canada
The Young Girls Turn 25	Les demoiselles ont eu 25 ans	Agnès Varda	France
Wendemi, The Good Lord's Child	Wendemi, l'enfant du bon Dieu	Saint Pierre Yaméogo	Burkina Faso, France
The Wrong Man		Jim McBride	United States

=== Out of Competition ===
The following films were selected to be screened out of competition:

English title	Original title	Director(s)	Production Country
The Baby of Mâcon		Peter Greenaway	United Kingdom, France, Germany, Belgium, Netherlands
Cliffhanger		Renny Harlin	United States
Mad Dog and Glory		John McNaughton	United States
Madadayo	まあだだよ	Akira Kurosawa	Japan
Toxic Affair (closing film)		Philomène Esposito	France

=== Short film competition ===
The following short films competed for the Short Film Palme d'Or:

- Ævintýri á okkar tímum by Inga Lísa Middleton
- Coffee and Cigarettes III by Jim Jarmusch
- De 4 jaargetijden by Maarten Koopman
- Le goût du fer by Rémi Bernard
- Lenny Minute 1: Lenny Meets the Giant Blue Sheila Doll by Glenn Standring
- Mama Said by Michael Costanza
- Me voy a escapar by Juan Carlos de Llaca
- Robokip by Rudolf Mestdagh
- The Singing Trophy by Grant Lahood
- Der Sortierer by Stephan Puchner

== Parallel sections ==
=== International Critics' Week ===
The following films were screened for the 32nd International Critics' Week (32e Semaine de la Critique):

Feature film competition

- Cronos by Guillermo del Toro (Mexico)
- Faut-il aimer Mathilde? by Edwin Baily (France)
- Requiem for a Handsome Bastard (Requiem pour un beau sans cœur) by Robert Morin (Canada)
- Combination Platter by Tony Chan (United States)
- Don't Call Me Frankie by Thomas A. Fucci (United States)
- Abissinia by Francesco Martinotti (Italy)
- Les histoires d’amour finissent mal... en général by Anne Fontaine (France)

Short film competition

- The Debt by Bruno de Almeida (United States)
- Take My Breath Away by Andrew Shea (United States)
- Passage à l’acte by Martin Arnold (Austria)
- Sotto le unghie by Stefano Sollima (Italy)
- Falstaff on the Moon by Robinson Savary (France)
- Springing Lenin by Andrei Nekrasov (United Kingdom)
- Schwarzfahrer by Pepe Danquart (Germany)

=== Directors' Fortnight ===
The following films were screened for the 1993 Directors' Fortnight (Quinzaine des Réalizateurs):

- Vaterland by Yevgeniy Lungin
- Sundays on Leave (È pericoloso sporgersi) by Nae Caranfil
- Fausto by Rémy Duchemin
- Grand bonheur by Hervé Le Roux
- Child Murders (Gyekgyilkossagok) by Ildikó Szabó
- I Love a Man in Uniform by David Wellington
- Je m'appelle Victor by Guy Jacques
- La Ardilla Roja by Julio Medem
- La Place d’un autre by René Féret
- The Blue Kite (Lan Fengzeng) by Tian Zhuangzhuang
- Le Mari de Léon by Jean-Pierre Mocky
- Lolo by Francisco Athié
- Menace II Society by Albert Hughes, Allen Hughes
- Mi Vida Loca by Allison Anders
- Me Ivan, You Abraham (Moi Ivan, Toi Abraham) by Yolande Zauberman
- Padma Nadir Majhi by Goutam Ghose
- Pilkkuja ja pikkuhousuja (Lyrics and Lace) by Matti Ijäs
- Ruby in Paradise by Victor Nuñez
- Shadows in a Conflict (Sombras en una batalla) by Mario Camus
- The Snapper by Stephen Frears
- Abraham's Valley (Vale Abraão) by Manoel De Oliveira

Short films

- Comment font les gens by Pascale Bailly
- L'Exposé by Ismaël Ferroukhi
- José Jeannette by Bruno Nicolini
- Le Regard de l’autre by Bruno Rolland
- Qui est-ce qui a éteint la lumière? by Xavier Auradon
- Reste by Marie Vermillard
- Rives by Erick Zonca
- La Vis by Didier Flamand

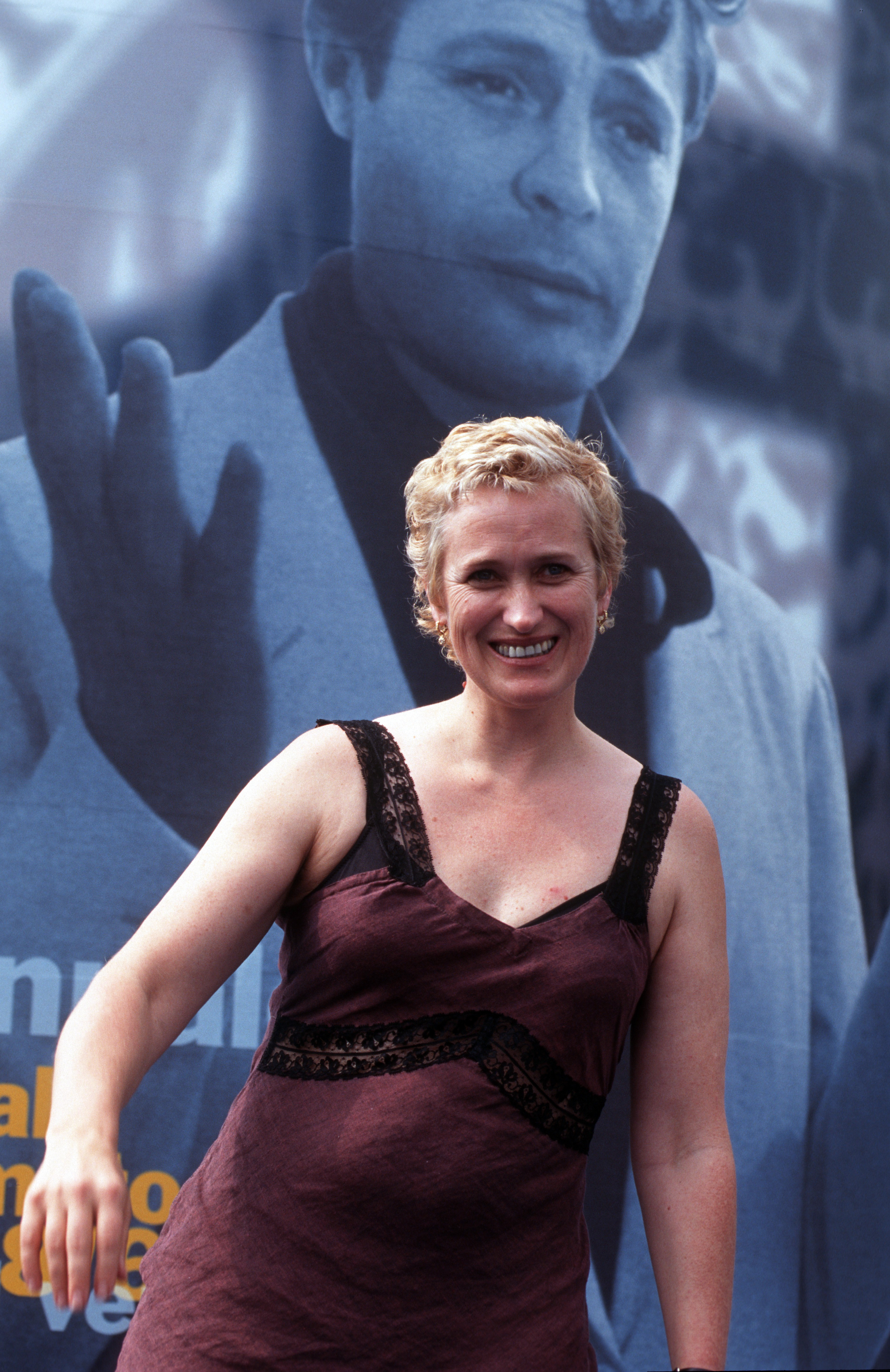
Jane Campion, winner of the Palme d'Or at the event.

== Official Awards ==
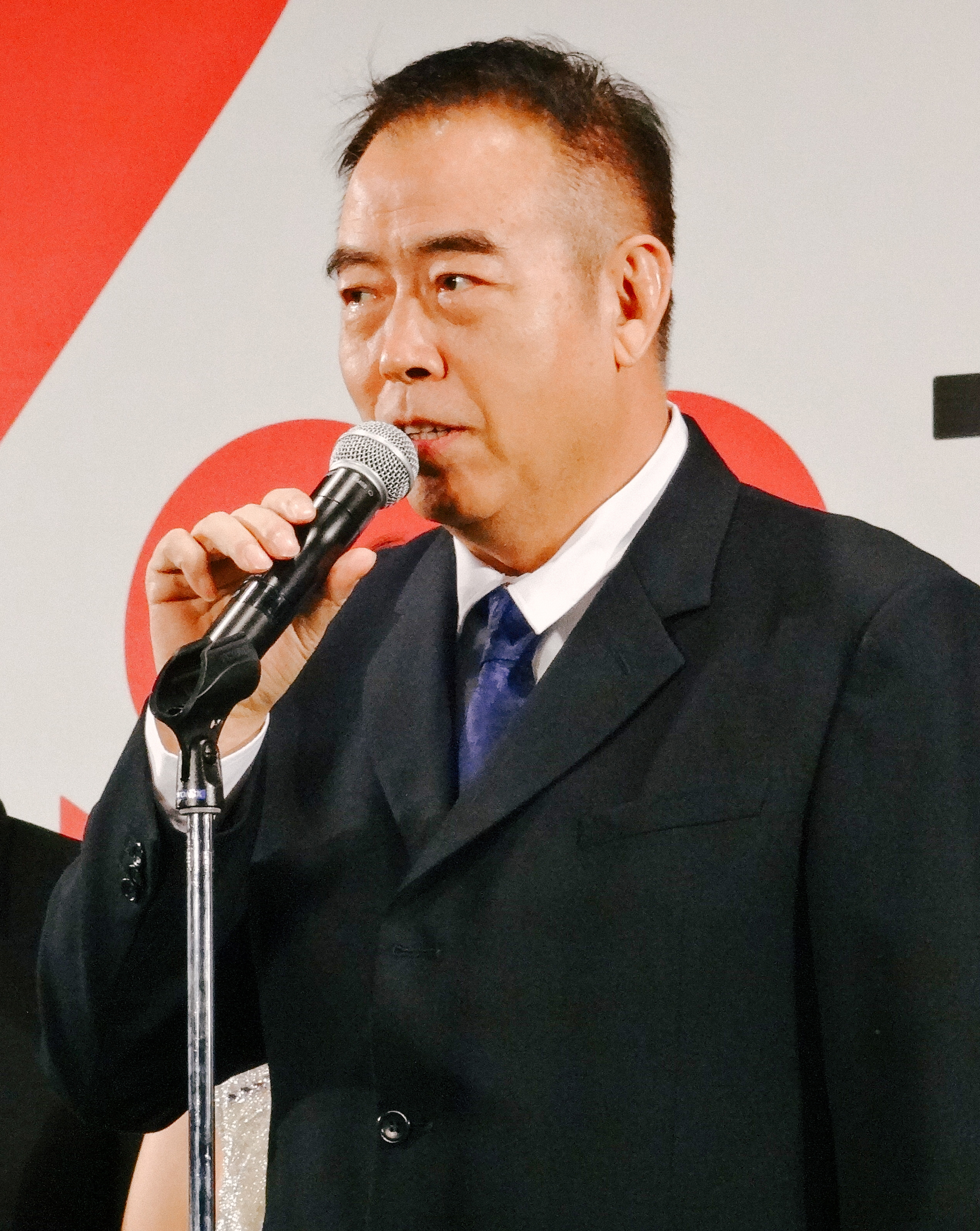
Chen Kaige, winner of the Palme d'Or at the event.

=== In Competition ===
- Palme d'Or:
  - Farewell My Concubine by Chen Kaige
  - The Piano by Jane Campion
- Grand Prize of the Jury: Faraway, So Close! by Wim Wenders
- Best Director: Mike Leigh for Naked
- Best Actress: Holly Hunter for The Piano
- Best Actor: David Thewlis for Naked
- Jury Prize:
  - Raining Stones by Ken Loach
  - The Puppetmaster by Hou Hsiao-hsien

=== Caméra d'Or ===
- The Scent of Green Papaya by Tran Anh Hung
  - Special Mention: Friends by Elaine Proctor

=== Short Film Palme d'Or ===
- Coffee and Cigarettes by Jim Jarmusch

== Independent Awards ==
=== FIPRESCI Prizes ===
- Farewell My Concubine by Chen Kaige (In competition)
- Child Murders by Ildikó Szabó (Directors' Fortnight)

=== Commission Supérieure Technique ===
- Technical Grand Prize: Jean Gargonne and Vincent Arnardi (for technical achievements in images and sound) for Mazeppa
  - Special Mention: Grant Lahood (for technical achievements in images and sound) for The Singing Trophy

=== Prize of the Ecumenical Jury ===
- Libera me by Alain Cavalier
  - Special Mention: The Great Pumpkin by Francesca Archibugi

=== Award of the Youth ===
- Foreign Film: The Red Squirrel by Julio Médem
- French Film:
  - Me Ivan, You Abraham by Yolande Zauberman
  - The Scent of Green Papaya by Tran Anh Hung

=== International Critics' Week ===
- Mercedes-Benz Award: Cronos by Guillermo del Toro
- Canal+ Award: The Debt by Bruno de Almeida
- Kodak Short Film Award: L'Exposé by Ismaël Ferroukhi

== Media ==
- INA: Opening of the 1993 Festival (commentary in French)
- INA: List of winners of the 1993 festival (commentary in French)
