= Rue des Marronniers =

Street in Lyon, France

Coordinates: 45°45′26″N 4°50′05″E

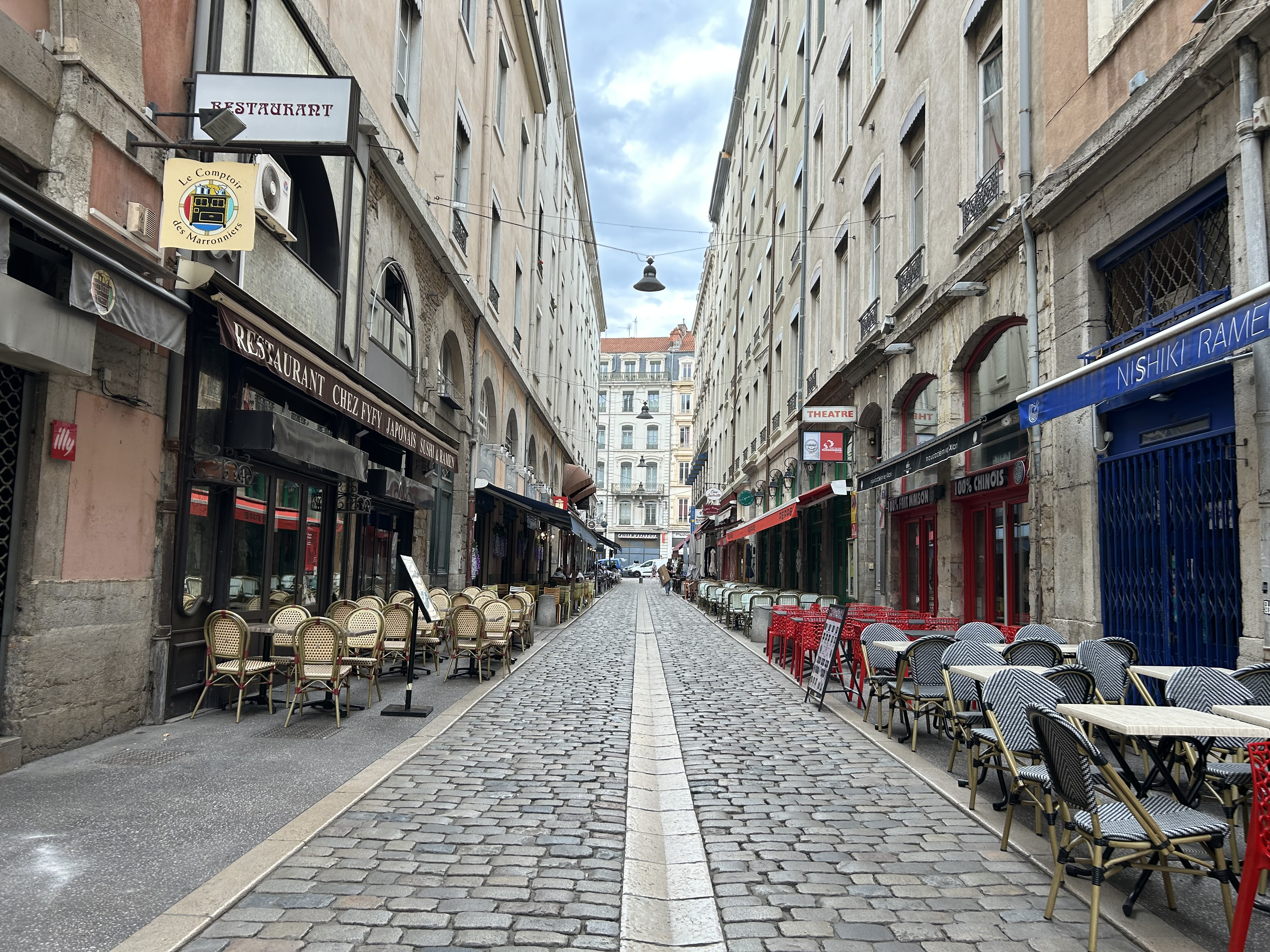
- The Marronniers street in 2025.
- Width: 8 m
- Location: 2nd arrondissement of Lyon, Lyon, France
- Postal code: 69002

Construction
- Construction start: 18th century

The Rue des Marronniers (French pronunciation: [ʁy de maʁɔnje]) is a street located in the Bellecour quarter, in the 2nd arrondissement of Lyon. It is a small paved pedestrian street famous for its many bouchons. It is served by the metro station Bellecour and many buses. The street belongs to a zone classified as a World Heritage Site by UNESCO.

== History ==
Located near the Place Bellecour and the Place Antonin-Poncet, the street was named after the trees that lined the square (they have since been removed) on its eastern side until the eighteenth century, after being named Rue de Jérusalem, then Rue Neuve des Basses-brayes. Its current name was chosen by consular decree of 30 September 1723. It was drawn in the early eighteenth century, during the construction of buildings to the east of the Place Bellecour.

Mayor of Lyon and member of the National Assembly Démophile Laforest lived here in the 1849. Many architects participated in the construction of buildings, including Pierre Gauthier (No. 1), Marc-Antoine Trollier (No. 5), Melchior Munet (No. 7), Gabriel Rigod (No. 11). Even numbers 2 to 10 were built in 1714, demolished in 1793 and rebuilt in 1810.

The street became pedestrian in the late twentieth century.

== Architecture and notable monuments ==
The Théâtre des Marronniers is the most famous monument of the street.

In 1952, Roger Planchon created the Théâtre de la Comédie at number 3 bis, a former locksmith's workshop. When he left Lyon for Villeurbanne, Marcel Maréchal succeeded him and installed the Théâtre du Cothurne. Many famous actors did their training here (Pierre Arditi, Catherine Arditi, Marcel Bozonnet, Maurice Bénichou or Bernard Ballet). In 1986, the small theatre was turned into a cinema named CNP Bellecour, currently open on the Rue de la Barre.

As of 2008, there is still a Théâtre des Marronniers, but it is now at number 7.

The traboule at No. 3 bis crosses four buildings and has an interesting architecture. It starts with a porte-cochere and leads to the former Théâtre des Marronniers. It has two outputs: the first one ends with a semicircular gate, a paved floor and a Louis XVI-styled building, and the second one, blocked up, is in the same three-floor building but higher.
