= Place Antonin-Poncet =

Public square in Lyon, France

Coordinates: 45°45′23″N 4°50′05″E

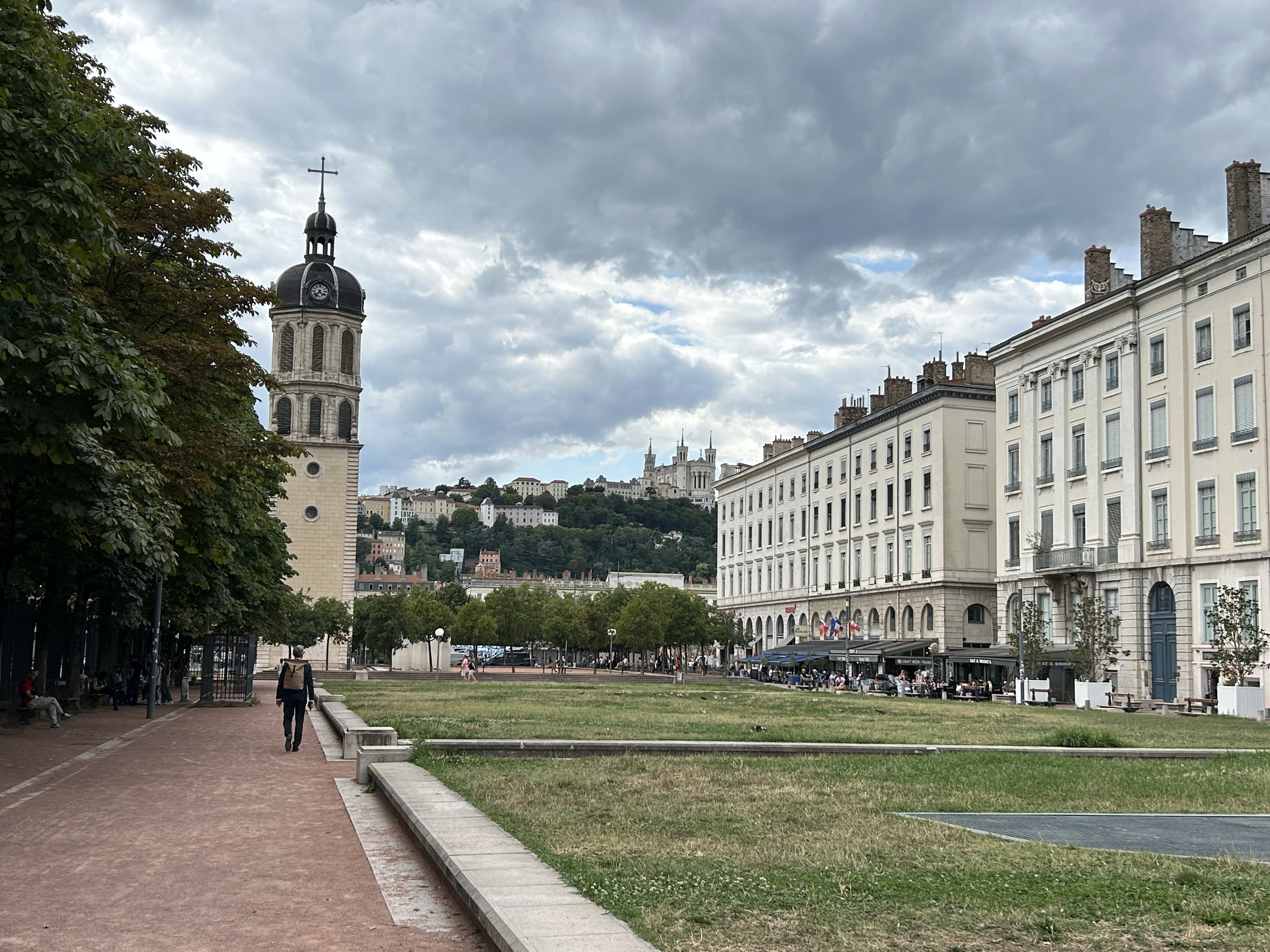
The Antonin-Poncet square viewed in 2025 from the Rhône; in the back, the Basilica of Notre-Dame de Fourvière.

The Place Antonin-Poncet (French pronunciation: [plas ɑ̃tɔnɛ̃ pɔ̃sɛ]) is a square located in the Bellecour quarter, near the Place Bellecour, in the 2nd arrondissement of Lyon, France. It is served by the metro station Bellecour of the lines A and D, and by many buses. The square belongs to the zone classified as World Heritage Site by UNESCO.

== Location and description ==
The square is in the Presqu'île, between the Place Bellecour and the Rhône. The Rue des Marronniers, a small pedestrian street famous for its many bouchons, can be reached from the square. It has also stairs leading down to the river of the Rhône.

The square was designed by landscaper Michel Bourne in 1990.

The square has a rectangular form from east to west. To the south, it is bordered by the post hotel with an architecture composed of long horizontal lines, which replaced in 1938 the Hôpital de la Charité, was designed under the supervision of architect Michel Roux Spitz between 1935 and 1938, in an almost identical style to the classical 18th century facades of the north of the square. The building is adorned with a 250-m^{2} wall painting by Louis Bouquet which evokes the "worldwide influence of Lyon through the exchange and waves". Around its entrances, there are bas-reliefs sculpted by Georges Salendre, JH Bardey and Renard. In the north, the buildings, made by JF Desarnod, have Lyon-styled facades and a ground floor composed of trades. The western part of the square, elevated (50 cm) in 1980, is bordered with rows of lime trees to the north and south and is the location of many events. There are lawns, fountains and benches.

The vegetation is mainly composed of horse chestnuts, maples and magnolias.

At the end of the square, next to the river, there is a giant bunch of flowers, that is a work of contemporary art created by Korean Jeong-Hwa Choi, entitled The Flower Tree.

== History and monuments ==
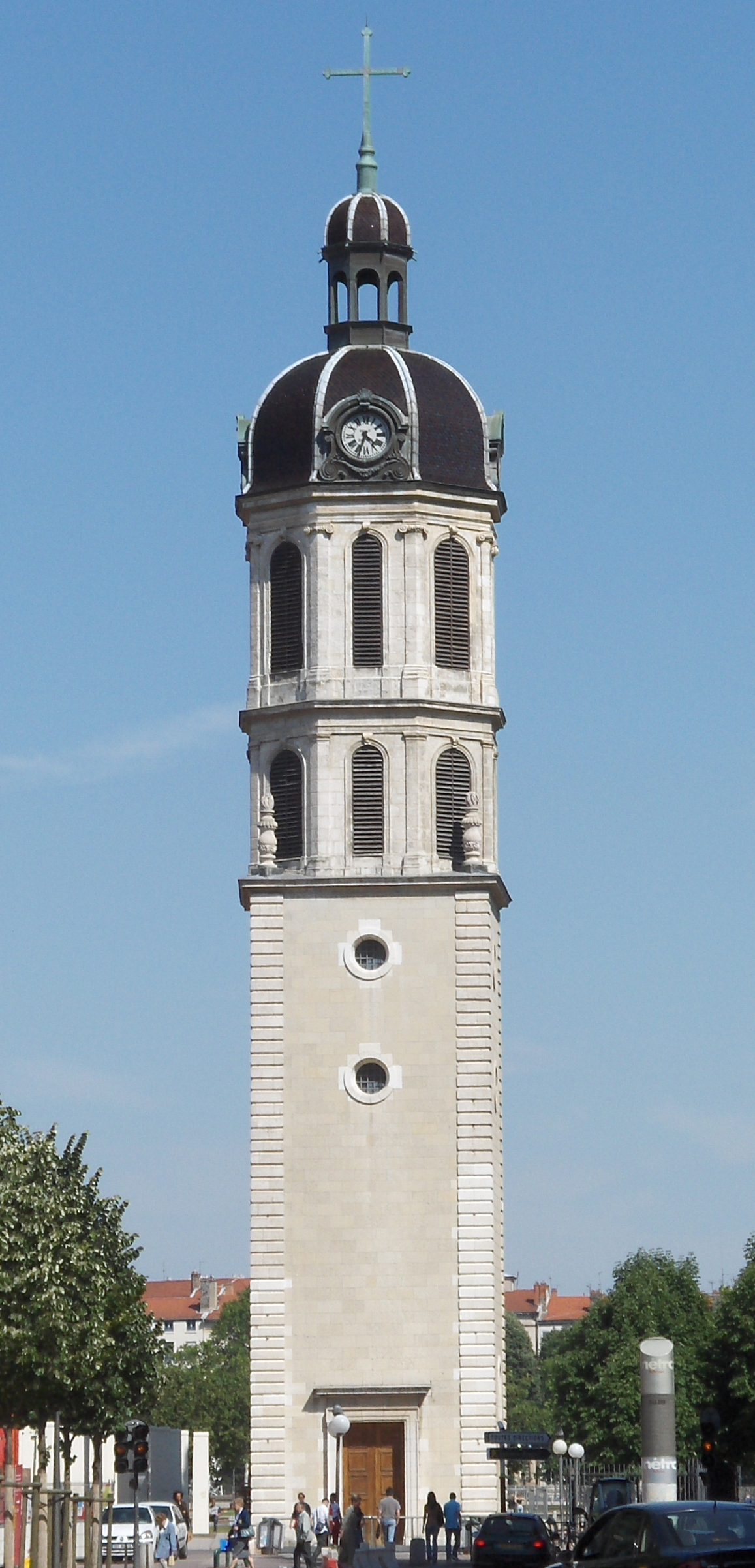
The bell tower viewed from the Place Bellecour. This is the only remaining part of the original hospital.

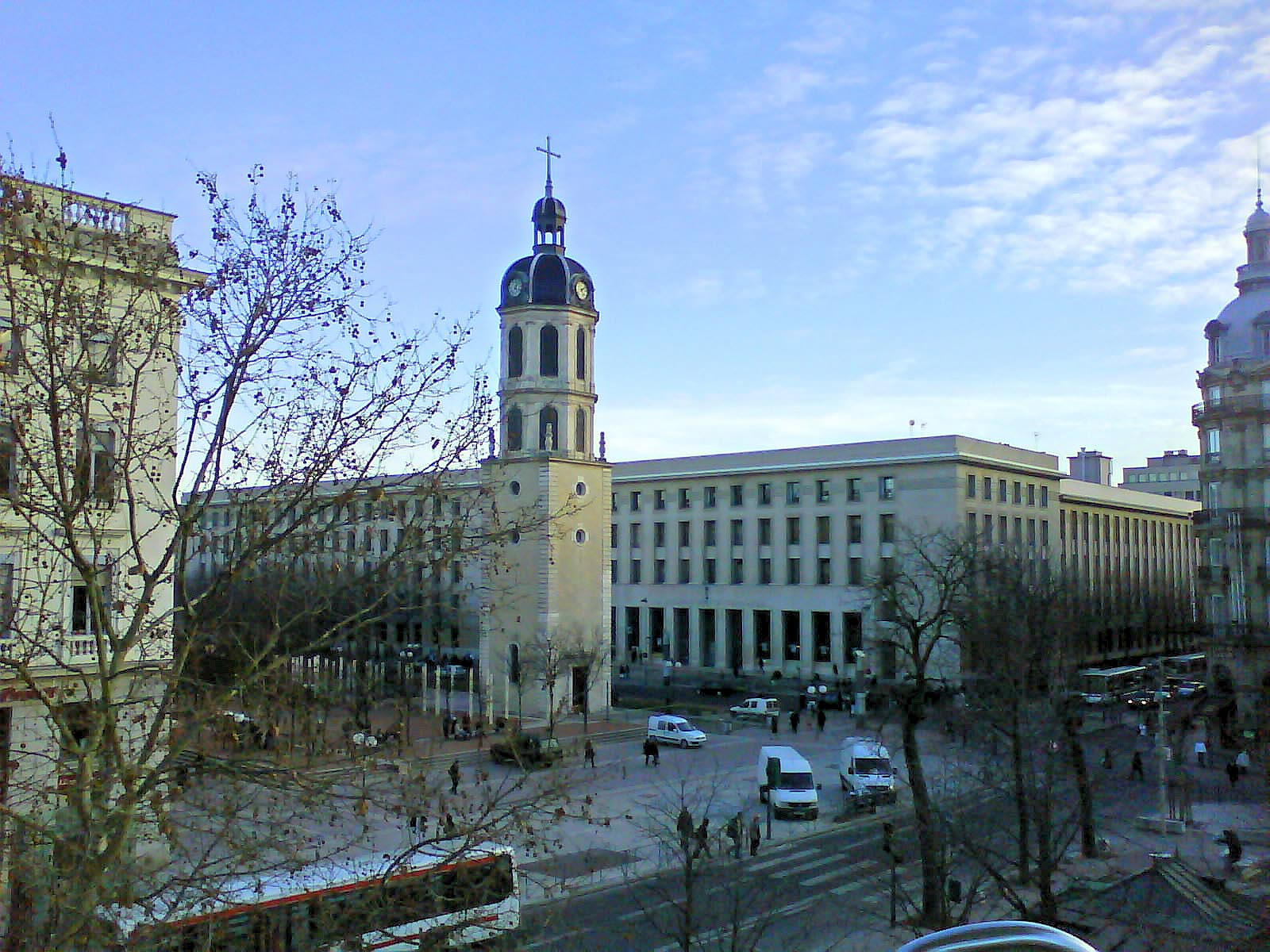
The bell tower and the Armenian memorial viewed from the Ferris wheel on the Place Bellecour

In 1816, a triumphal arch was erected on the square, Princess Caroline of Naples and Sicily went down it and listened to a welcome speech by the Lyon mayor. In 1858, the offices of Le Salut Public were located at No. 18. Among famous inhabitants of the square, there were the king's commissioner Pierre-Thomas Rambaud (1792) and the king's court adviser Devienne (1834).

On the Place Antonin-Poncet, there is the bell tower of the old Hôpital de la Charité. The hospital, designed in 1622 by the Jesuit architect Étienne Martellange, was destroyed in 1934. The bell tower, built in 1665-66 by J. Abraham, was the sole monument retained. At the time, it was the second largest hospital in Lyon after the Hôtel-Dieu de Lyon and was more of a hospice than a hospital.

The square is named after the doctor Antonin Poncet (1849, Lyon - 1913), who did not work at the Hôpital de la Charité, but at the Hôtel-Dieu. Before the deliberation of the municipal council on 29 December 1913, the square was called Place de la Charité.

During the period of the collaborationist Vichy regime, Number 7 was a hotbed of resistance activities. Gynecologist Dr. Jean Rousset aided British agent Virginia Hall in a number of ways. He used an insane asylum on the top floor to hide Allied pilots. On 7 November 1942, Rousset was arrested by the Germans and tortured but survived the war.

On the square, a monument composed of two steel plates of two meters high is a tribute to victims of Armenian genocide, and was inaugurated on 24 April 2006.

== Major events ==
Every winter, a 60-metre Ferris wheel is installed. However, since 2006, due to major work on the square, the wheel is located a few metres further, on the Place Bellecour.

== Civic initiative ==
The Amis de la place Antonin Poncet ("Friends of the Antonin Poncet plaza") non for profit organization was created on January 8, 2016. Its mission is to promote the heritage and beauty of the plaza in order to preserve this exceptional public space, which serves as a unique doorway to the city of Lyon and as a symbol of the "Art of Living" in Lyon. The organization carries out its mission in a helpful and friendly manner in order to protect, maintain, and keep the plaza attractive. Les Amis de la place Antonin Poncet collaborates with all public authorities. The organization brings together a group of citizens, including residents, firms, businesses, and professionals who live on or near the plaza, as well as all of those who love the plaza, a place that is part of Lyon's identity as a city.
