= Elaine Proctor =

South African film director (born 1960)

- Born: 1960 (age 65–66); Johannesburg, South Africa
- Citizenship: South African
- Occupations: Novelist, film director, screenwriter, actor
- Years active: 1979–present
- Notable work: Friends; Game for Vultures

Elaine Proctor (born 1960) is a South African film director, screenwriter, novelist, and actress. Her film Friends was entered into the 1993 Cannes Film Festival, where it won the Caméra d'Or Special Distinction.

Proctor attended the National Film and Television School, where she studied under director Mike Leigh. Her graduation film, On the Wire, won the school's Sutherland Trophy. Proctor has also written two novels. Her second novel, Savage Hour, was shortlisted for the 2015 Barry Ronge Fiction Prize.

== Filmography ==
- Game for Vultures (1979)
- Sharpeville Spirit (1986)
- We Will See/Re tla bona (1987)
- On the Wire (1990)
- Friends (1993)
- Kin (2000)

== Fiction ==
- Rhumba (2011)
- Savage Hour (2015)
