= Friends (1993 film) =

1993 film by Elaine Proctor

- VHS cover
- Directed by: Elaine Proctor
- Written by: Elaine Proctor
- Produced by: Judith Hunt
- Starring: Kerry Fox; Dambisa Kente; Michele Burgers
- Cinematography: Dominique Chapuis
- Edited by: Tony Lawson
- Music by: Rachel Portman
- Production company: Chrysalide Film
- Distributed by: Haut et Court (France); BBC Two (UK)
- Release date: 15 September 1993
- Running time: 105 minutes
- Country: South Africa
- Language: English

Friends is a 1993 South African independent drama film directed by Elaine Proctor. It was entered into the 1993 Cannes Film Festival, where it won an award for Caméra d'Or Special Distinction. The film is set during apartheid in Johannesburg and follows three friends who each represent a different faction of South African society.

== Plot ==
Three young women live together in apartheid-era Johannesburg, with each of them dealing with apartheid in different ways. Thoko, a Black woman, works as a schoolteacher and practices non-violent passive resistance. Aninka, an Afrikaner, is an archeologist who rejects her family’s pro-apartheid politics. Sophie, who is from a British family, is a librarian but secretly belongs to an anti-apartheid terrorist organisation. Sophie plants bombs in public places on behalf of the organisation. One day, a bomb she leaves at an airport explodes and kills innocent bystanders, including an elderly Black woman. The tragic incident fractures the women’s friendships and loyalties.

== Cast ==
- Kerry Fox as Sophie
- Dambisa Kente as Thoko
- Michele Burgers as Aninka
- Marius Weyers as Johan
- Tertius Meintjes as Jeremy
- Dolly Rathebe as Innocentia
- Wilma Stockenström as Iris
- Carel Trichardt as Rheinhart
- Anne Curteis as Sophie's mother
- Ralph Draper as Sophie's father
- Mary Twala as Grace
- Maphiki Mabohi as Daphne
- Job Kubatsi as Maurondile
- Vanessa Cooke as Prison's warden
- Jerry Mofokeng as Thomi
- Trevi Jean Le Pere as Jeremy's lover

== Reception ==
David Stratton of Variety wrote "The tense, divided realities of life in contemporary South Africa are vividly brought to the screen in 'Friends,' a provocative pic from first-time writer-director Elaine Proctor. Despite intriguing characters and good performances, however, the film is saddled with a schematic screenplay that leaves many questions unanswered and problems unaddressed." Stratton contended though the screenplay has "many rough edges and contrivances", Friends "is so well-acted that the occasional flaws can be easily overlooked." He concluded "Proctor’s depiction of the uneasy atmosphere of Johannesburg between 1985 and 1990 is so vivid that audiences should be completely caught up in the drama."

Writing for the San Francisco Chronicle, Leah Garchik said, "'Friends' is a movie about politics, but without political diatribe; about relationships, but without a single touchy-feely frame; about women, but without a feminist agenda; and about South Africa without bias from right or left." Barbara Shulgasser, writing for the San Francisco Examiner, was more critical, stating, "Fox and Kente give stirring performances and Procter's depiction of South Africa's institutionalized prejudice is chilling. But the film never arrives at the emotional punch it seems to be moving toward and that is a disappointment."

Friends was shown in competition at the 1993 Cannes Film Festival, where it won a Prix de Camera D’Or - Special Mention honor.
