= Francesco Gagliardi =

Italian director

Francesco Gagliardi (born 27 August 1974) is an Italian film director, screenwriter and film producer.

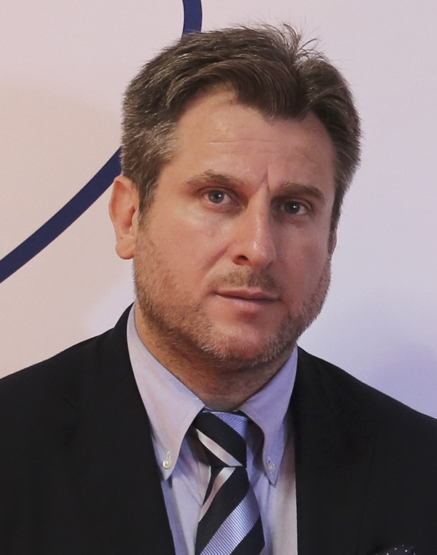
Francesco Gagliardi at 75th Cinema Exhibition in Venice 2018

After completing the high school studies, he won the competition in the Academy of Genio Ferrovieri of the Italian Army based in Turin, attending it from 1992 to 1997. In 1998 he wrote and directed his first short film, Saturday night which, thanks to the social issues treated, such as alcohol, drugs and speed, the causes of Saturday night massacres, is presented in many high schools in the Campania region.

In June 2008, he founded in Rome FG Pictures, a film production company.

At the 63rd Salerno Film Festival, he was awarded "Best Newcomer Producer" for Prigioniero di un segreto, and in the same year he was responsible for distribution of Valeriu Jereghi's Arrivederci, which also received an award at the festival, for its important social themes. In July 2015, he directs the documentary-film with the title Mediterranean diet example to the world, of which he is the co-author. Sponsored by CICT UNESCO, the documentary, filmed in Italy, in the Region of Campania, and Africa, talks about the lifestyle of the Mediterranean diet throughout a trip of a wise old man, interpreted by Franco Nero.

In 2009 he produced the film Prigioniero di un segreto directed by Carlo Fusco and distributed by Iris Film Distribution, receiving the award as "Best debut producer" at the 63rd Salerno International Film Festival. In the same year, he has distributed Arrivederci, directed by Valeriu Jereghi, also awarded in Salerno for having treated with style and elegance the tragedy of two brothers.

From 2010 to 2012, he attended the academic cycle of filmmakers in Rome at the ACT Multimedia, Academy of Film and Television, in Cinecittà Studios, directed by Vittorio Giacci, specializing in film direction under the guidance of director Carlo Lizzani.

In 2015 he wrote the subject and the screenplay of the short film La casa dei sogni. In the same year he has been co-author and director of Mediterranean diet example to the world, a documentary with Franco Nero, on the Mediterranean diet. Created in collaboration with Rai Cinema and presented in world premiere at the Milan EXPO, for its high socio-cultural value, the film has been screened at the UNESCO headquarters in Paris and, selected in competition at the 72nd Salerno International Film Festival, won the "Best Film" category award in the "Discovery Campania" section.

In 2018 he has written and directed the comedy Mò Vi Mento - Lira di Achille, presented at the 75th Venice Film Festival in the section "Venice Production Bridge", at the 20th edition of the Naples Film Festival in the section "Close Encounters" and winner as "Best Film" at the 72nd Salerno International Film Festival. The film will be released in Italian theaters in April 2019 by Europictures and Hum Distribution. Starting from the screenplay, he writes the homonymous novel published by the Italian publisher Armando Curcio Editore.

== Sources ==
- Francesco Gagliardi at Mymovies.it (in Italian)
