= Valeriu Jereghi =

Valeriu Jereghi OR
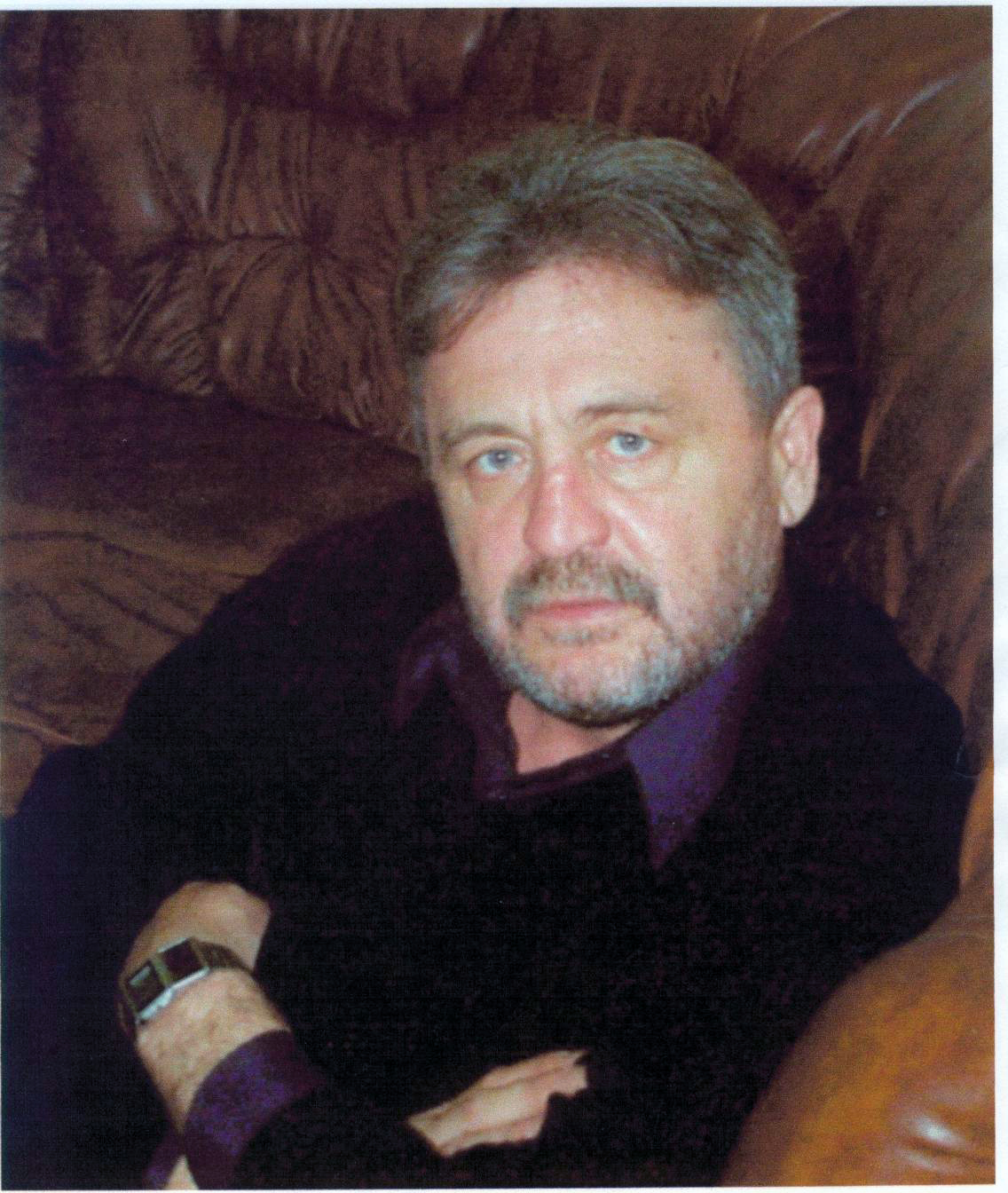
- Jereghi in 2006
- Born: October 19, 1948 (age 77); Strășeni, Moldavian SSR, Soviet Union
- Education: Gerasimov Institute of Cinematography, (VGIK) Moscow
- Occupations: Filmmaker, scriptwriter, actor
- Years active: 1972–present

Valeriu Jereghi (born 19 October 1948) is a Moldovan film director and screenwriter, the member of the Union of Cinematographers of Moldova and Russia since 1978, “MAESTRU IN ARTE”.

He graduated from the Chisinau Institute of Arts, Department of Film Direction in 1970 and the Gerasimov Institute of Cinematography, (VGIK, Moscow), Department of Film Direction in 1975. He has worked with the international studios, such as Moldova-Film, France-RTR K-2, and Nikita Mikhalkov’s studio in TRI-TE.

His feature film “Predchuvstviye” (in English: Presentiment) was selected in the Un Certain Regard section at the 1993 Cannes Film Festival.

His experimental black and white feature film “Arrivederci”, written and produced within 12 days, was screened at the European Parliament in 2008 and received Erasmus EuroMedia Award and many other international awards for its important social themes. The film has been distributed also in Italy from Francesco Gagliardi.

In 2013 Valeriu Jereghi founded The Association of Young Cinematographers of Moldova.

Valeriu Jereghi presents Moldova as a peace-oriented and hard working country. His films and books often reflect social reality in Moldova evoking the feelings of hope and love. Besides working as director and writer he also teaches and promotes young filmmakers from Moldova.

== Filmography ==
- MORNING,(1975), (VGIK Thesis Film) Scriptwriter and director-Producer
- STORK, Аист (фильм), (1978), (MOLDOVA-FILM), Scriptw riter and director-Producer,
  - Awards in Mannheim, Germany and Salonika, Greece
- EVERYTHING COULD BE DIFFERENT, Всё могло быть иначе,(1983), (MOLDOVA-FILM)Co-script, Director-Producer.
  - The Second Prize of the All-Union Film Festival (Leningrad).
  - The First Prize of the All-Union Film Festival of Young Cinematographers The Silver Stork Award (Chisinau)
- GLEB, (1984), (MOLDOVA-FILM) Documentary Scriptwriter, Director
- WILD WIND, Дикий ветер (фильм),(1985),(MOLDOVA-FILM, Yugoslavia, USA) Co-director-Producer
- IONA, Иона (фильм) (1987), (MOLDOVA-FILM)Scriptwriter and director-Producer.
  - The Second Prize of the All-Union Film Festival (Tbilisi)
- DISSIDENT, Диссидент (фильм), (1990), (MOLDOVA-FILM, Austria, Hungary) Co-script and director-Producer
- PRESENTIMENT, Предчувствие (фильм, 1992), (1992) - Romanian ȘI VA FI (Russia, Romania)Scriptwriter and director-Producer.
  - Grand Prix and the award for the Best Female Role in Costinesti, Romania.
  - Special Jury Award in Saint Rafael, France.
  - “Un Certain Regard” Program, 1993 Cannes Film Festival
- HOMELESS CHILDREN, (1993), (Nikita Mikhalkov's TRI-TE Studio)Full-length Documentary. Co-script, Cinematographer, Director.
  - Bronze Knight Award (Tiraspol).
  - Law, Order and Society Festival Award (Moscow)
- ANNEGRET AND HER CHILDREN, (1994)(Germany) Full-length Documentary. Co-producer, Scriptwriter, Cinematographer, Director
- THIRD GENERATION, (1995), (France) Full-length Documentary. Producer, Cinematographer, Director
- SPIRITUAL HERITAGE, (1999), (Russia). Full-length Documentary. Scriptwriter, Cinematographer, Director
- KALUGA TERRITORY, (2000), (Russia) Full-length Documentary in two parts. Scriptwriter, Cinematographer, Director
- MAGPIE, (2001), (Moldova) Full-length Documentary, Scriptwriter, Cinematographer, Director
- KRASNODAR TERRITORY, EAGLET, (2002), (Russia)Full-length documentary. Scriptwriter, Cinematographer, Director
- KOLOMNA TERRITORY, (2003), (Russia) Full-length Documentary. Scriptwriter, Cinematographer, Director
- CREATION OF LOVE, Сотворение любви,(2006), Scriptwriter and director-Producer.
  - Awards for the Best Camera Work, Best Scenography and People's Choice(New Cinema- 21st Century International Film Festival)
- IN THE SNAKE'S SKIN, (2007), Theatrical Film in the Mihai Eminescu National Theatre of Moldova, Based on the Tennessee Williams play, "Orpheus Descending" Scriptwriter and director
- PRIM-PLAN STUDIO and VALERIU JEREGHI ACTORS'AGENCY, (2007), Founder and Artistic Director
- ARRIVEDERCI,Arrivederci (2008), (PRIM-PLAN STUDIO, Moldova) Director, Cinematographer, Producer.
  - Screening and Discussion at the European Parliament in Brussels, Belgium
  - GRAND-PRIX Award (The Eleventh Eurasian Teleforum in Moscow, Russia 2008).
  - ABSOLUTE PRIZE of the International Film Festival in Salerno, Italy (2009).
  - GRAND-PRIX and BEST PICTURE (Kinotur-2009 International Film Festival in Zhytomyr, Ukraine).
  - COUNTRY MEDAL and the SPONSORSHIP AWARD(Erasmus EuroMedia Awards in Vienna, Austria 2009).
  - GRAND-PRIX (Korona Karpat International Film Festival in Truskavec, Ukraine).
  - BEST DIRECTOR, BEST PICTURE, and SPECIAL JURY PRIZE “Hope of the Festival”(International Film Festival in Berdyansk, Ukraine 2009).
  - BEST DIRECTOR (International Rights Film Festival STEPS in Kharkov, Ukraine 2009)
  - SPECIAL JURY PRIZE (Algidus Art Film Festival in Rome, Italy).
  - EXCELLENCE IN CINEMATOGRAPHIC CREATION (Dream Fest Cinema International Festival in Slatina, Romania)
  - HONORED GUEST and the FIRST FILM SCREENED (MovieClub International Film Festival in Palestrina, Italy).
  - FIRST PRIZE (Identita Film Festival in Rome, Italy)
  - PREMIO ITALIA – 2011 (Rome, Italy). Decorated with one of the highest church awards of the Moldovan Metropoly – THE ORDER OF THE BLESSED PAISIUS VELICHKOVSKY
- BIRDS OF PASSAGE, (2010), Screenplay
- Co-founder of the First International Children’s Film Festival in Romania, (2011)
- AMORE E GUERA (LOVE AND WAR), (2011), Screenplay

Author of books "Cinema Shorts Stories” and “Amore e Guera”. Published in " Nistru", "Codri", "Tinerimea Moldovei", "Screen and Stage", "Art of the Cinema", and "Film Scripts" journals.
