= Mazeppa (1993 film) =

1993 film

- Film poster
- Directed by: Bartabas
- Written by: Bartabas; Claude-Henri Buffard
- Produced by: Yvon Crenn; Marin Karmitz
- Starring: Miguel Bosé
- Cinematography: Bernard Zitzermann
- Edited by: Joseph Licidé
- Release date: 13 October 1993
- Running time: 111 minutes
- Country: France
- Language: French

Mazeppa is a 1993 French drama film directed by Bartabas. It was entered into the 1993 Cannes Film Festival where it won the Technical Grand Prize. It is part of the cultural legacy of Mazeppa, a Ukrainian hero and a narrative poem by Lord Byron.

== Plot ==
Based loosely on French painter Théodore Géricault's life who met the famous equestrian Antonio Franconi, the director of the Cirque Olympique. Gericault decided to stay and live with the circus and painted only horses to try and understand the mystery of this animal. Mazeppa embodies a man carried away by his passion.

== Cast ==
- Miguel Bosé - Gericault
- Bartabas - Franconi
- Brigitte Marty - Mouste
- Eva Schakmundes - Alexandrine
- Fatima Aibout - Cascabelle
- Bakary Sangaré - Joseph
- Norman Calabrese - Ami de Géricault
- Henri Carballido - Ami de Géricault
- Frédéric Chavan - Ami de Géricault
- Patrick Kabakdjian - Ami de Géricault
- Michel Lacaille - Ami de Géricault
- Claire Leroy - Amie de Géricault
- Bernard Malandain - Ami de Géricault

== See also ==
- List of films about horses
