= The Young Girls Turn 25 =

1993 film

- Directed by: Agnès Varda
- Written by: Agnès Varda
- Cinematography: Agnès Varda
- Release date: May 1993
- Running time: 64 minutes
- Country: France
- Language: French

The Young Girls Turn 25 (French: Les demoiselles ont eu 25 ans) is a 1993 French documentary film directed by Agnès Varda, about Jacques Demy's 1967 film The Young Girls of Rochefort. It was screened in the Un Certain Regard section at the 1993 Cannes Film Festival.

== Cast ==
- Mag Bodard
- George Chakiris (archive footage)
- Danielle Darrieux (archive footage)
- Jacques Demy (archive footage)
- Catherine Deneuve
- Françoise Dorléac (archive footage)
- Bernard Evein
- Jean-Louis Frot
- Gene Kelly (archive footage)
- Michel Legrand
- Jacques Perrin
- Michel Piccoli (archive footage)
- Jacques Riberolles (archive footage)
- Bertrand Tavernier
- Grover Dale
