= Libera me (1993 film) =

- Film poster
- Directed by: Alain Cavalier
- Written by: Alain Cavalier; Bernard Crombey; Andree Fresco
- Starring: Louis Becker
- Cinematography: Patrick Blossier
- Edited by: Marie-Pomme Carteret
- Release date: 17 November 1993
- Running time: 75 minutes
- Country: France

Libera me is a 1993 French experimental film directed by Alain Cavalier. It was entered into the 1993 Cannes Film Festival.

== Synopsis ==
In a country ruled by a repressive regime, a network of resistance fighters uses all its ingenuity to overthrow the dictatorship. Despite torture and arrests, a resistance movement is born.

== Cast ==
- Louis Becker
- Catherine Caron
- Paul Chevillard
- Annick Concha as Mother
- Pierre Concha as Father
- François Cristophe
- Cécile Haas as Helper's girlfriend
- Michel Labelle as Butcher
- Thierry Labelle as Older son
- Jean Monot
- Michel Quenneville as Photographer
- Claire Séguin as Blonde woman
- Philippe Tardif as Helper
- Christophe Turrier as Younger son
