= Louis, the Child King =

1993 French drama film

- Directed by: Roger Planchon
- Written by: Roger Planchon
- Produced by: Margaret Ménégoz
- Starring: Maxime Mansion; Jocelyn Quivrin; Paolo Graziosi; Carmen Maura
- Cinematography: Gérard Simon
- Edited by: Isabelle Devinck
- Music by: Jean-Pierre Fouquey
- Distributed by: Les Films du Losange
- Release date: 21 April 1993
- Running time: 160 minutes
- Country: France
- Language: French
- Box office: $4 million

Louis, the Child King (French: Louis, enfant roi) is a 1993 French drama film directed by Roger Planchon, depicting the youth of King Louis XIV. It was entered into the 1993 Cannes Film Festival.

== Cast ==
- Carmen Maura - Anne d'Autriche
- Maxime Mansion - Louis XIV
- Paolo Graziosi - Cardinal Mazarin
- Jocelyn Quivrin - Philippe, Duc d'Anjou
- Hervé Briaux - Gaston d'Orléans
- Brigitte Catillon - Duchesse de Chevreuse
- Irina Dalle - Grande Mademoiselle
- Serge Dupire - Prince de Condé
- Isabelle Gélinas - Duchesse de Châtillon
- Michèle Laroque - Duchesse de Longueville
- Aurélien Recoing - Jean François Paul de Gondi
- Régis Royer - Prince de Conti
- Vanessa Wagner - Charlotte de Chevreuse
- Laurent Gamelon - Descouches
- Maurice Barrier - Guitaud
- Marco Bisson - Le duc de Nemours
- Carlo Brandt - Duc de la Rochefoucauld
- Charles Berling
