= Hervé Le Roux =

French film critic and director (1958–2017)

- Born: 1958
- Died: 26 July 2017 (aged 59); Poitiers, France
- Occupations: Film critic, director
- Employer: Cahiers du Cinéma

Hervé Le Roux (1958 – 26 July 2017) was a French film critic and director.

== Early life ==
Hervé Le Roux was born in 1958.

== Career ==
Le Roux began his career as a critic for Cahiers du Cinéma. In 1989, he was an assistant director to Alain Bergala's Incognito.

Le Roux directed three films. His first film, Grand Bonheur, was released in 1993. His second film, released in 1997, was a three-hour documentary called Reprise. The film showed the reactions of factory workers in Saint-Ouen, Seine-Saint-Denis who had to return to work at the end of the 1968 strikes. His third film, On appelle ça... le printemps, was released in 2001.

== Death ==
Le Roux died on 26 July 2017 in Poitiers at the age of 59.
