= Augusto M. Seabra =

Portuguese music and film critic (1955–2024)

Augusto Manuel Seabra (9 August 1955 – 5 September 2024) was a Portuguese music and film critic who was active from 1977. He wrote many articles to the Portuguese newspaper Público. Seabra had a regular presence at many film festivals, such as Cannes, San Sebastian and Turin. He was president of Saldanha Cultural Association and director of programme of Monumental Festivals 1995 and 1996. Seabra was also responsible for a lot of cinema cycles such as Riscos from Doclisboa, from 2007. He was also a music consultant for the Seixas Santos film E o tempo passa. He was also commissioner of OrquestrUtópica concerts – “Metropolis – Música e Política” e “BMC – NYC, Black Mountain College – New York City”. Seabra died on 5 September 2024, at the age of 69.
