= Bartabas =

French horse trainer

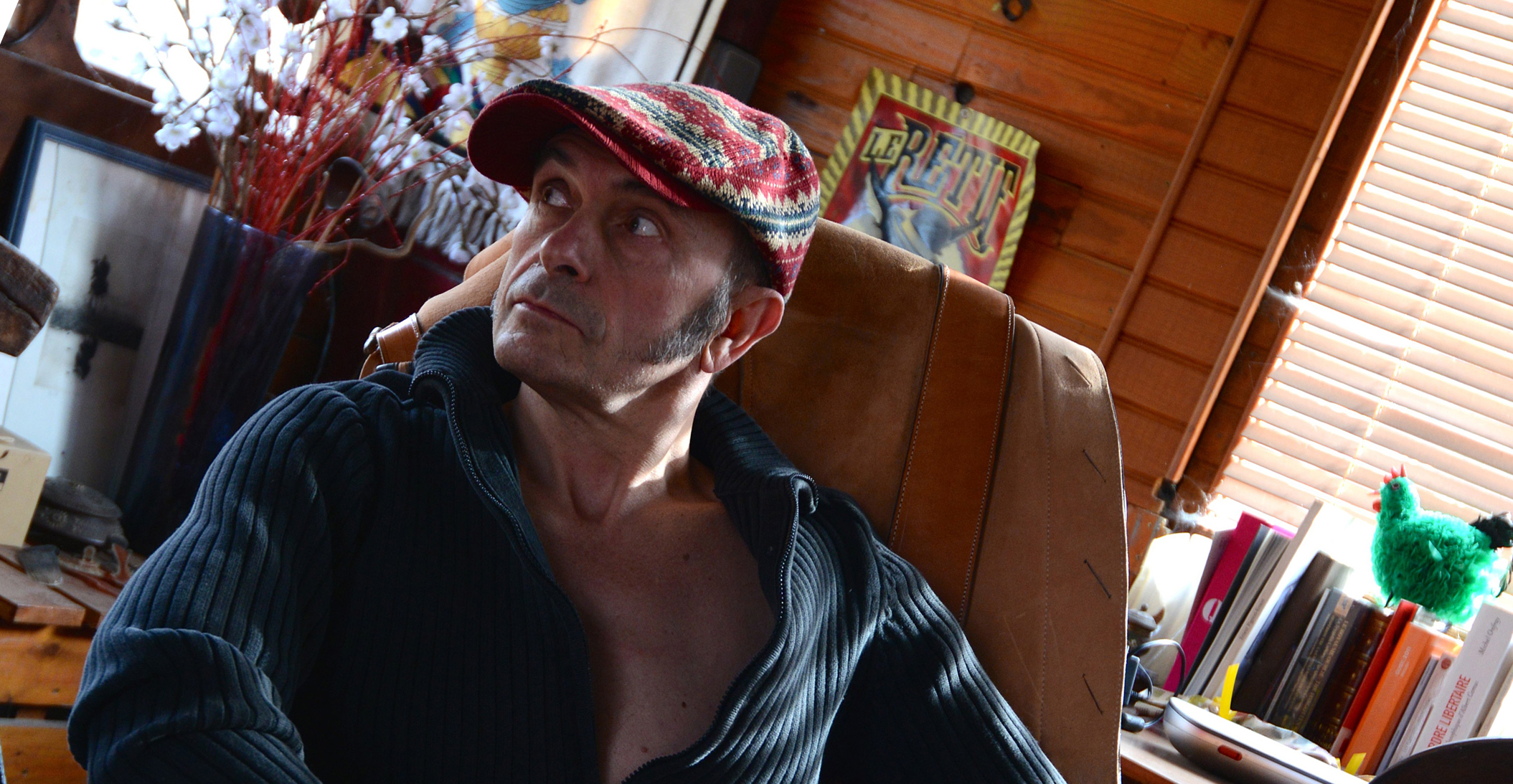
Bartabas

Bartabas (born Clément Marty, 2 June 1957) is the performing name of a French horse trainer, film producer and impresario. He created his first theater company at age seventeen, and later founded the performing troupe, Cirque Aligre. In 1984, he founded the equestrian performing show, Zingaro, which means "Gypsy". The name was taken from the name of his first horse, a Friesian horse who was also the star of his shows.

He also produced two movies: Mazeppa (1993) and Chamane (1995), both of which featured spectacular equestrian action. Mazeppa was entered into the 1993 Cannes Film Festival where it won the Technical Grand Prize.

Though he is not a household name in the United States, among those who know horses he is considered one of the most talented trainers currently living . In Japan, he is well known for his performances which blend equine acrobatics and explosive pyrotechnics. In 2002, he founded the Académie du Spectacle Équestre (Academy of Equestrian Arts) in the Grande Ecurie of the Palace of Versailles.
