= Roger Planchon =

French playwright and filmmaker (1931–2009)

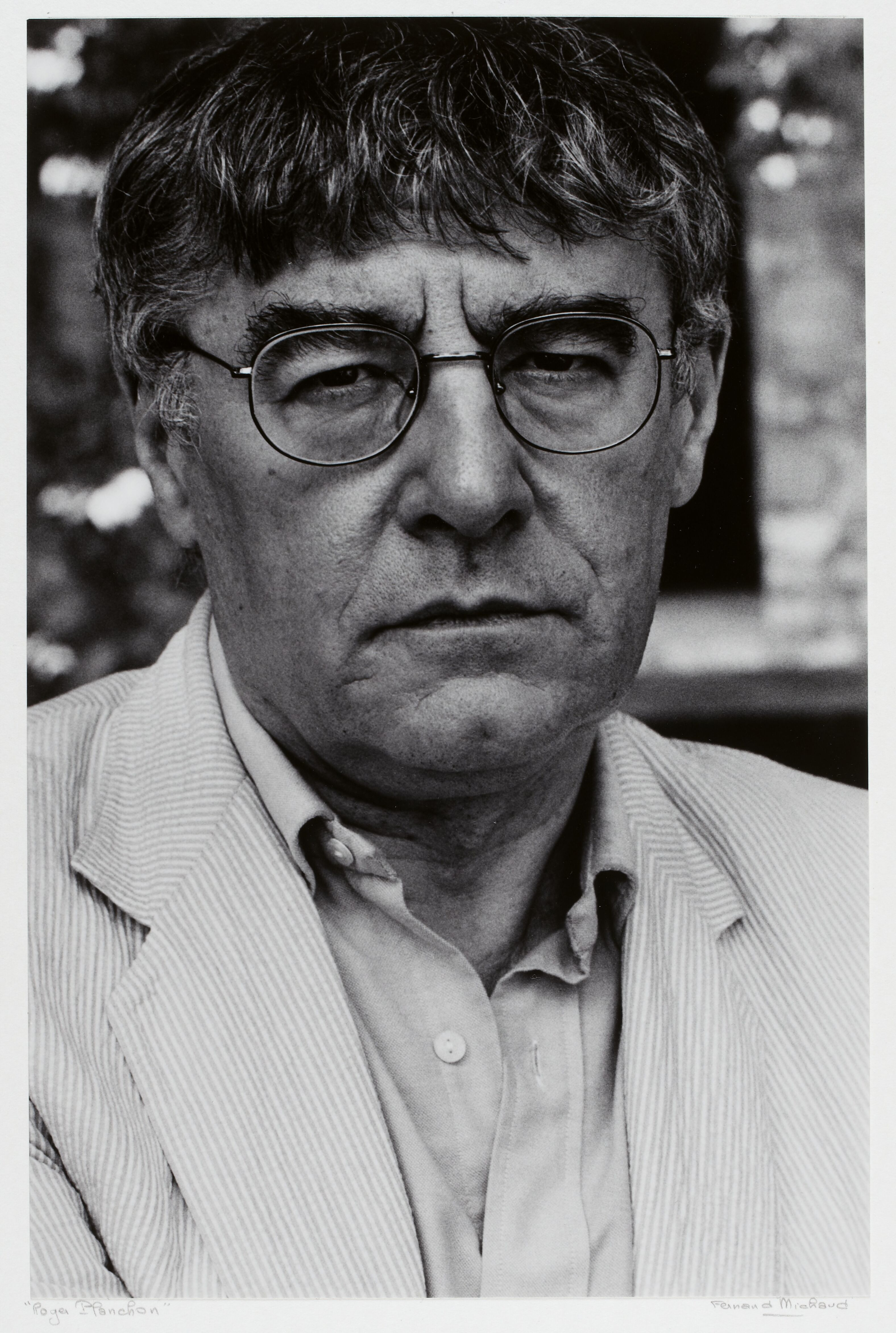
- Born: Roger Émile Planchon; 12 September 1931; Saint-Chamond, Loire
- Died: 12 May 2009 (aged 77); Paris
- Resting place: Père Lachaise Cemetery
- Occupations: Playwright, director, actor
- Years active: 1949–2000s

Roger Planchon (French pronunciation: [ʁɔʒe plɑ̃ʃɔ̃]; born 12 September 1931 in Saint-Chamond, Loire, died on 12 May 2009 in Paris), was a French playwright, director, and filmmaker.

== Biography ==
Roger Planchon spent his childhood in the Ardèche, notably in Dornas. He found its inspiration from his rural origins and this issue was a recurring theme in his writings.

He started on stage in 1949 after winning an amateur theater. In 1952, he founded the Théâtre de la Comédie, located in the rue des Marronniers, in Lyon. He was the director of the Théâtre de la Cité of Villeurbanne since 1957 (which became the Théâtre National Populaire in 1972).

Roger Planchon transposed many works by Brecht, Molière, Shakespeare, and many works of contemporary authors, including Arthur Adamov and Michel Vinaver, but also opened the Théâtre National Populaire to Patrice Chéreau, then Georges Lavaudant.

As films, he directed George Dandin ou le Mari confondu by Molière, Louis, enfant roi, which was entered at Cannes, and another one by Lautrec.

=== End of life ===
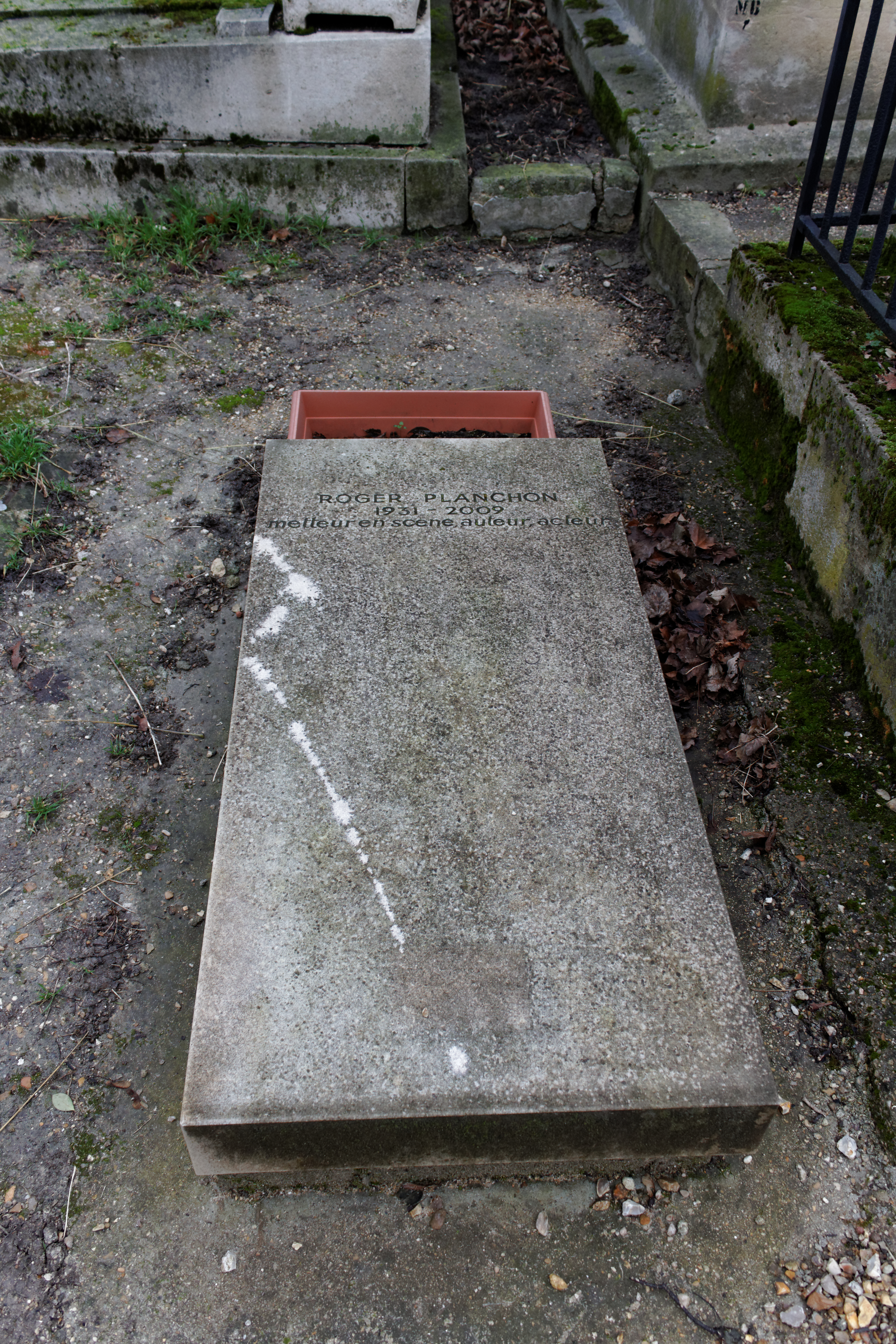
Planchon's grave in Père Lachaise Cemetery.

In 2002, Christian Schiaretti succeeded him as director of the TNP; he created his own company with which he continued to write and direct until his death.

He died on 12 May 2009 after a heart attack, he is buried in the Père Lachaise Cemetery (22nd division).

== Filmography ==
Year	Title	Role	Notes
1956	A Man Escaped	Le garde cycliste	
1973	George Who?	Victor Borie / Michel de Bourges, l'avocat	
1974	The Others	Alexis Artaxerxès	
1978	Roads to the South	L'avocat parisien	
1978	Dossier 51	Esculape 1	
1978	Molière	Colbert	
1979	I as in Icarus	Le professeur David Naggara	
1982	The Return of Martin Guerre	Jean de Coras	
1982	Légitime violence	Philippe Miller	
1982	The Big Brother	Inspecteur Valin	
1983	Danton	Fouquier-Tinville	
1984	A Strange Passion	L'évêque	
1984	La 7ème cible	Le commissaire Paillard	
1988	Dandin	Le tragédien	
1988	Camille Claudel	Morhardt	
1989	Radio Corbeau	Faber - le maire de Saint-Meyrand	
1990	Jean Galmot, aventurier	Castellane	
1991	L'année de l'éveil	Le Capitaine / The captain	
1993	Louis, the Child King	Le vieux domestique	
1993	Pétain	Narrator	Voice
1998	Lautrec	Le vieil acteur	
