= Teilhet =

Teilhet may refer to:

- Teilhet, Ariège, a commune in the Ariège department, France
- Teilhet, Puy-de-Dôme, a commune in the Puy-de-Dôme department, France
- Teilhet (surname)
