= Arrondissement of Pamiers =

Coordinates: 43°07′N 1°37′E

Pamiers
- Arrondissement
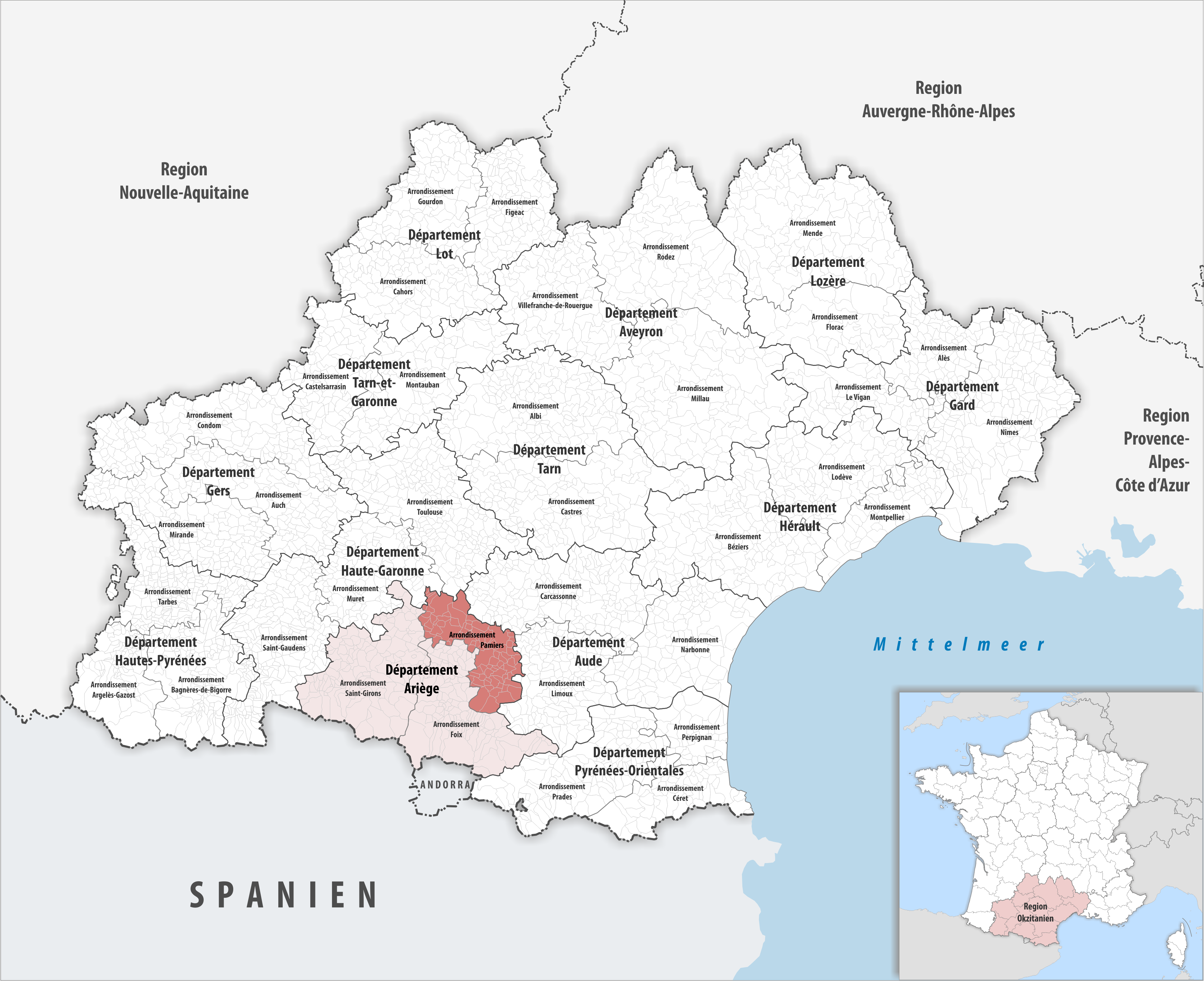
- Location within the region Occitanie
- Country: France
- Region: Occitania
- Department: Ariège
- No. of communes: {{{nbcomm}}}
- Area: 1,076.9 km^{2} (415.8 sq mi)
- Population (2023): 66,001
  - Density: 61.288/km^{2} (158.74/sq mi)
- INSEE code: 092

The arrondissement of Pamiers is an arrondissement of France in the Ariège department in the Occitanie region. It has 91 communes. Its population is 65,785 (2021), and its area is 1,076.9 km^{2} (415.8 sq mi).

== Composition ==
The communes of the arrondissement of Pamiers, and their INSEE codes, are:

1. Aigues-Vives (09002)
2. L'Aiguillon (09003)
3. Arvigna (09022)
4. La Bastide-de-Bousignac (09039)
5. La Bastide-de-Lordat (09040)
6. La Bastide-sur-l'Hers (09043)
7. Bélesta (09047)
8. Belloc (09048)
9. Benagues (09050)
10. Bénaix (09051)
11. Besset (09052)
12. Bézac (09056)
13. Bonnac (09060)
14. Brie (09067)
15. Camon (09074)
16. Canté (09076)
17. Carla-de-Roquefort (09080)
18. Le Carlaret (09081)
19. Cazals-des-Baylès (09089)
20. Coutens (09102)
21. Dreuilhe (09106)
22. Dun (09107)
23. Esclagne (09115)
24. Escosse (09116)
25. Esplas (09117)
26. Fougax-et-Barrineuf (09125)
27. Freychenet (09126)
28. Gaudiès (09132)
29. Ilhat (09142)
30. Les Issards (09145)
31. Justiniac (09146)
32. Labatut (09147)
33. Lagarde (09150)
34. Lapenne (09153)
35. Laroque-d'Olmes (09157)
36. Lavelanet (09160)
37. Léran (09161)
38. Lescousse (09163)
39. Lesparrou (09165)
40. Leychert (09166)
41. Lieurac (09168)
42. Limbrassac (09169)
43. Lissac (09170)
44. Ludiès (09175)
45. Madière (09177)
46. Malegoude (09178)
47. Manses (09180)
48. Mazères (09185)
49. Mirepoix (09194)
50. Montaut (09199)
51. Montbel (09200)
52. Montferrier (09206)
53. Montségur (09211)
54. Moulin-Neuf (09213)
55. Nalzen (09215)
56. Pamiers (09225)
57. Péreille (09227)
58. Le Peyrat (09229)
59. Pradettes (09233)
60. Les Pujols (09238)
61. Raissac (09242)
62. Régat (09243)
63. Rieucros (09244)
64. Roquefixade (09249)
65. Roquefort-les-Cascades (09250)
66. Roumengoux (09251)
67. Saint-Amadou (09254)
68. Sainte-Foi (09260)
69. Saint-Félix-de-Tournegat (09259)
70. Saint-Jean-d'Aigues-Vives (09262)
71. Saint-Jean-du-Falga (09265)
72. Saint-Julien-de-Gras-Capou (09266)
73. Saint-Martin-d'Oydes (09270)
74. Saint-Michel (09271)
75. Saint-Quentin-la-Tour (09274)
76. Saint-Quirc (09275)
77. Saint-Victor-Rouzaud (09276)
78. Sautel (09281)
79. Saverdun (09282)
80. Tabre (09305)
81. Teilhet (09309)
82. La Tour-du-Crieu (09312)
83. Tourtrol (09314)
84. Trémoulet (09315)
85. Troye-d'Ariège (09316)
86. Unzent (09319)
87. Vals (09323)
88. Le Vernet (09331)
89. Villeneuve-d'Olmes (09336)
90. Villeneuve-du-Paréage (09339)
91. Viviès (09341)

== History ==
The arrondissement of Pamiers was created in 1800, disbanded in 1926 and restored in 1942. At the January 2017 reorganization of the arrondissements of Ariège, it lost 18 communes to the arrondissement of Foix and 27 communes to the arrondissement of Saint-Girons, and it gained 21 communes from the arrondissement of Foix.

As a result of the reorganisation of the cantons of France which came into effect in 2015, the borders of the cantons are no longer related to the borders of the arrondissements. The cantons of the arrondissement of Pamiers were, as of January 2015:

1. Le Fossat
2. Le Mas-d'Azil
3. Mirepoix
4. Pamiers-Est
5. Pamiers-Ouest
6. Saverdun
7. Varilhes
