= Regat =

Regat may refer to:

- Régat, a commune in southwestern France
- Romanian Old Kingdom, Regat in Romanian and German languages
