= Cazals =

Cazals may refer to:

== Geographical ==
Cazals is the name or part of the name of several communes in France:

- Cazals, in the Lot department
- Cazals, in the Tarn-et-Garonne department
- Cazals-des-Baylès, in the Ariège department

== Music ==
- Cazals (band), a rock band from London, England
