= Leychert =

Commune in Occitanie, France

- Commune
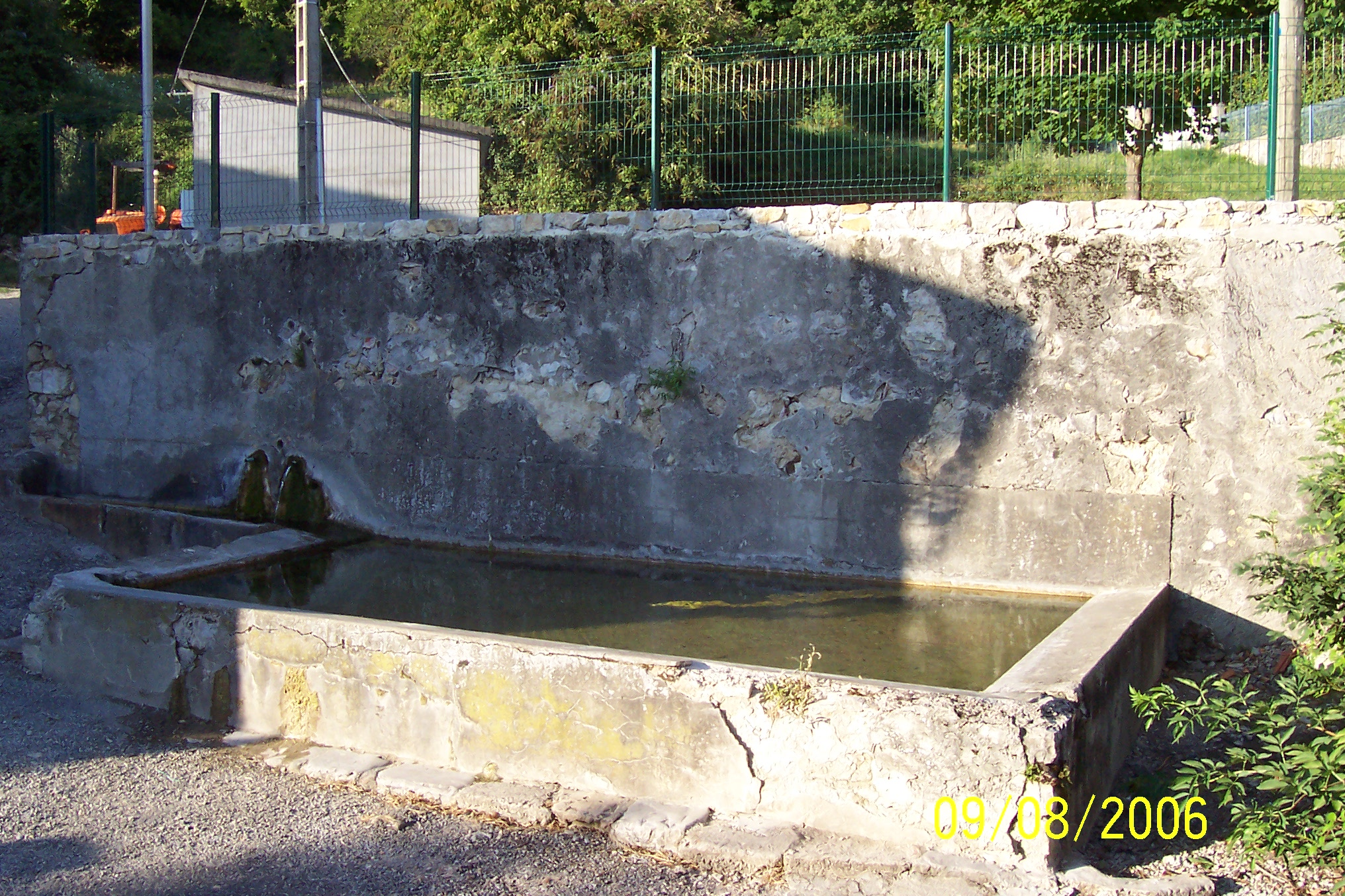
- The watering trough in Leychert
- Location of Leychert
- Location within France Location within Occitanie
- Coordinates: 42°56′43″N 1°43′48″E
- Country: France
- Region: Occitania
- Department: Ariège
- Arrondissement: Pamiers
- Canton: Pays d'Olmes
- Intercommunality: Pays d'Olmes

Government
  - Mayor (2023–2026): Bernard Voegeli
- Area^{1}: 5.77 km^{2} (2.23 sq mi)
- Elevation: 607 m (1,991 ft)
- Highest elevation: 934 m (3,064 ft)
- Lowest elevation: 516 m (1,693 ft)
- Population (2023): 114
  - Density: 19.8/km^{2} (51.2/sq mi)
- Time zone: UTC+01:00 (CET)
  - Summer (DST): UTC+02:00 (CEST)
- INSEE/Postal code: 09166 /09300
- ^{1} French Land Register data, which excludes lakes, ponds, glaciers > 1 km^{2} (0.386 sq mi or 247 acres) and river estuaries.

Leychert is a commune in the Ariège department in southwestern France.

== History ==
Etymology based on 2 assumptions: dry lake or forest cleared (comes from the name of the old domain "les eychartelles" which once included a forest)

The story depends Leychert until 1789 that of Roquefixade. Having belonged to the Count of Toulouse and the lord of Saint Paul Bernard Amiel de Pailhès, Leychert be included, since half of the 13th century, in the province of Languedoc, and not in the County of Foix (the limit being at In River, on the town's current Soula).

The village was part of the castellany Roquefixade (and Nalzen, Soula, Saint Cirac and river). It was in the King of France. The Lord of Those was the master of the late 17th century until the Revolution.

The church at Leychert was an annex of Roquefixade with a vicar. The church is dedicated to St. Anne, at least in 1633 (however, a church of Saint Pierre Leychert is regularly mentioned in the deeds of the 17th century). After years of disrepair, the church was restored in the mid-1990s and is classified as a historical monument.

== Population ==
Historical population
Year	Pop.	±% p.a.
1968	73	—
1975	49	−5.54%
1982	57	+2.18%
1990	65	+1.66%
1999	100	+4.90%
2007	105	+0.61%
2012	103	−0.38%
2017	99	−0.79%
2023	114	+2.38%
Source: INSEE

== See also ==
- Communes of the Ariège department
