= Ilhat =

Commune in Occitanie, France

- Commune
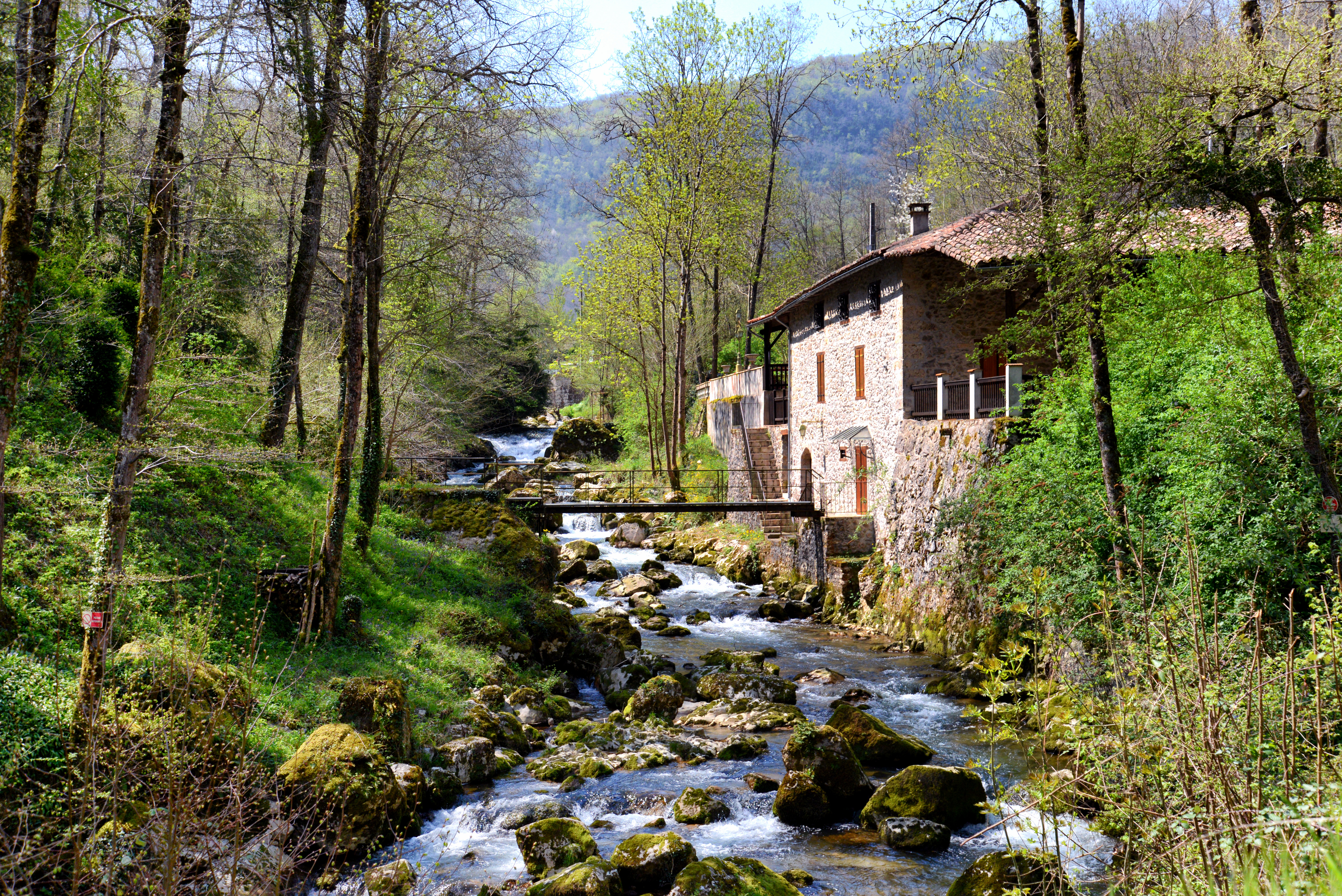
- The Douctouyre at Rapy, in Ilhat

- Coat of arms
- Location of Ilhat
- Location within France Location within Occitanie
- Coordinates: 42°57′28″N 1°47′06″E
- Country: France
- Region: Occitania
- Department: Ariège
- Arrondissement: Pamiers
- Canton: Pays d'Olmes
- Intercommunality: Pays d'Olmes

Government
  - Mayor (2020–2026): Christian Poplineau
- Area^{1}: 6.89 km^{2} (2.66 sq mi)
- Elevation: 434 m (1,424 ft)
- Highest elevation: 770 m (2,530 ft)
- Lowest elevation: 397 m (1,302 ft)
- Population (2023): 122
  - Density: 17.7/km^{2} (45.9/sq mi)
- Time zone: UTC+01:00 (CET)
  - Summer (DST): UTC+02:00 (CEST)
- INSEE/Postal code: 09142 /09300
- ^{1} French Land Register data, which excludes lakes, ponds, glaciers > 1 km^{2} (0.386 sq mi or 247 acres) and river estuaries.

Ilhat (before 1987: Illat) is a commune in the Ariège department in southwestern France.

== Population ==
Historical population
Year	Pop.	±% p.a.
1968	89	—
1975	72	−2.98%
1982	92	+3.56%
1990	97	+0.66%
1999	107	+1.10%
2007	123	+1.76%
2012	127	+0.64%
2017	111	−2.66%
2023	122	+1.59%
Source: INSEE

== See also ==
- Communes of the Ariège department
