= Raissac =

Commune in Occitanie, France

- Commune
- Location of Raissac
- Location within France Location within Occitanie
- Coordinates: 42°56′33″N 1°48′49″E
- Country: France
- Region: Occitania
- Department: Ariège
- Arrondissement: Pamiers
- Canton: Pays d'Olmes
- Intercommunality: Pays d'Olmes

Government
  - Mayor (2020–2026): François Hoareau
- Area^{1}: 3.84 km^{2} (1.48 sq mi)
- Elevation: 582 m (1,909 ft)
- Highest elevation: 823 m (2,700 ft)
- Lowest elevation: 535 m (1,755 ft)
- Population (2023): 43
  - Density: 11/km^{2} (29/sq mi)
- Time zone: UTC+01:00 (CET)
  - Summer (DST): UTC+02:00 (CEST)
- INSEE/Postal code: 09242 /09300
- ^{1} French Land Register data, which excludes lakes, ponds, glaciers > 1 km^{2} (0.386 sq mi or 247 acres) and river estuaries.

Raissac (French pronunciation: [ʁɛsak]) is a commune in the Ariège department in southwestern France.

== Population ==
Inhabitants are called Raissacois in French.

Historical population
| Year | Pop. | ±% p.a. |
|---|---|---|
| 1968 | 55 | — |
| 1975 | 42 | −3.78% |
| 1982 | 43 | +0.34% |
| 1990 | 36 | −2.20% |
| 1999 | 51 | +3.95% |
| 2007 | 43 | −2.11% |
| 2012 | 43 | +0.00% |
| 2017 | 48 | +2.22% |
| 2023 | 43 | −1.82% |
Source: INSEE

== See also ==
- Communes of the Ariège department
