= Coutens =

Commune in Occitanie, France

- Commune
- Coat of arms
- Location of Coutens
- Location within France Location within Occitanie
- Coordinates: 43°04′33″N 1°49′27″E
- Country: France
- Region: Occitania
- Department: Ariège
- Arrondissement: Pamiers
- Canton: Mirepoix

Government
  - Mayor (2020–2026): André Carbonnel
- Area^{1}: 4.19 km^{2} (1.62 sq mi)
- Elevation: 287 m (942 ft)
- Highest elevation: 480 m (1,570 ft)
- Lowest elevation: 278 m (912 ft)
- Population (2023): 179
  - Density: 42.7/km^{2} (111/sq mi)
- Time zone: UTC+01:00 (CET)
  - Summer (DST): UTC+02:00 (CEST)
- INSEE/Postal code: 09102 /09500
- ^{1} French Land Register data, which excludes lakes, ponds, glaciers > 1 km^{2} (0.386 sq mi or 247 acres) and river estuaries.

Coutens is a commune in the Ariège department in southwestern France.

== Population ==
Historical population
Year	Pop.	±% p.a.
1968	128	—
1975	127	−0.11%
1982	135	+0.88%
1990	151	+1.41%
1999	148	−0.22%
2007	151	+0.25%
2012	162	+1.42%
2017	172	+1.21%
2023	179	+0.67%
Source: INSEE

== See also ==
- Communes of the Ariège department
