= Vals, Ariège =

Commune in Occitanie, France

Vals
- Commune
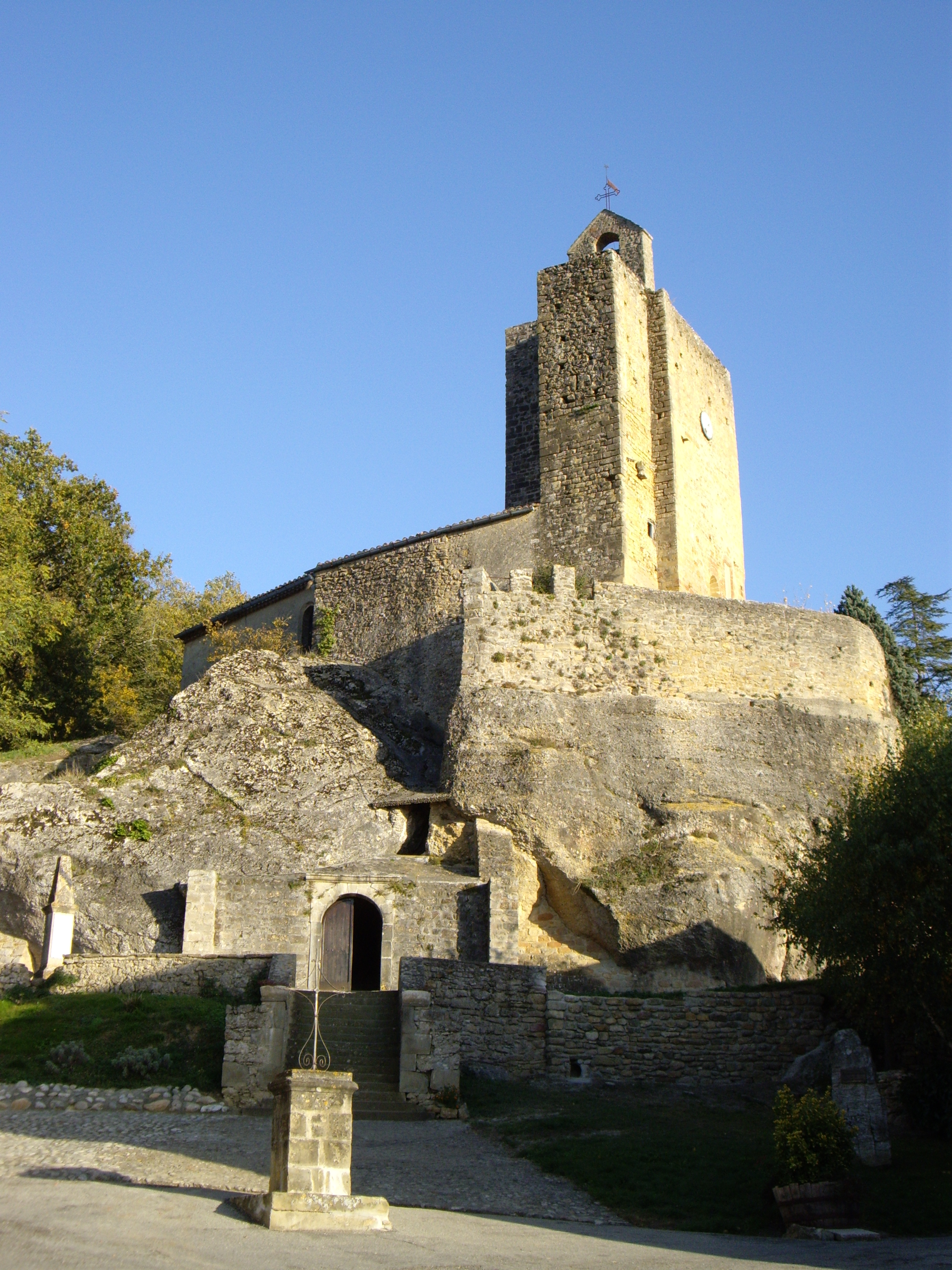
- The church in Vals

- Coat of arms
- Location of Vals
- Location within France Location within Occitanie
- Coordinates: 43°05′49″N 1°45′41″E
- Country: France
- Region: Occitania
- Department: Ariège
- Arrondissement: Pamiers
- Canton: Mirepoix

Government
  - Mayor (2020–2026): Emmanuel Fabre
- Area^{1}: 4.13 km^{2} (1.59 sq mi)
- Elevation: 270 m (890 ft)
- Highest elevation: 390 m (1,280 ft)
- Lowest elevation: 255 m (837 ft)
- Population (2023): 92
  - Density: 22/km^{2} (58/sq mi)
- Time zone: UTC+01:00 (CET)
  - Summer (DST): UTC+02:00 (CEST)
- INSEE/Postal code: 09323 /09500
- ^{1} French Land Register data, which excludes lakes, ponds, glaciers > 1 km^{2} (0.386 sq mi or 247 acres) and river estuaries.

Vals is a commune in the Ariège department in southwestern France.

It is known for the church "Eglise Rupestre de Vals" which is built into the giant rocks that make up its foundation. Picturesque in itself, it has a view of the valley spread out before it.

== Population ==
Inhabitants of Vals are called Valséens in French.

Historical population
Year	Pop.	±% p.a.
1968	54	—
1975	46	−2.26%
1982	45	−0.31%
1990	59	+3.44%
1999	67	+1.42%
2007	81	+2.40%
2012	93	+2.80%
2017	98	+1.05%
2023	92	−1.05%
Source: INSEE

== See also ==
- Communes of the Ariège department
