= Saint-Félix-de-Tournegat =

Commune in Occitanie, France

- Commune
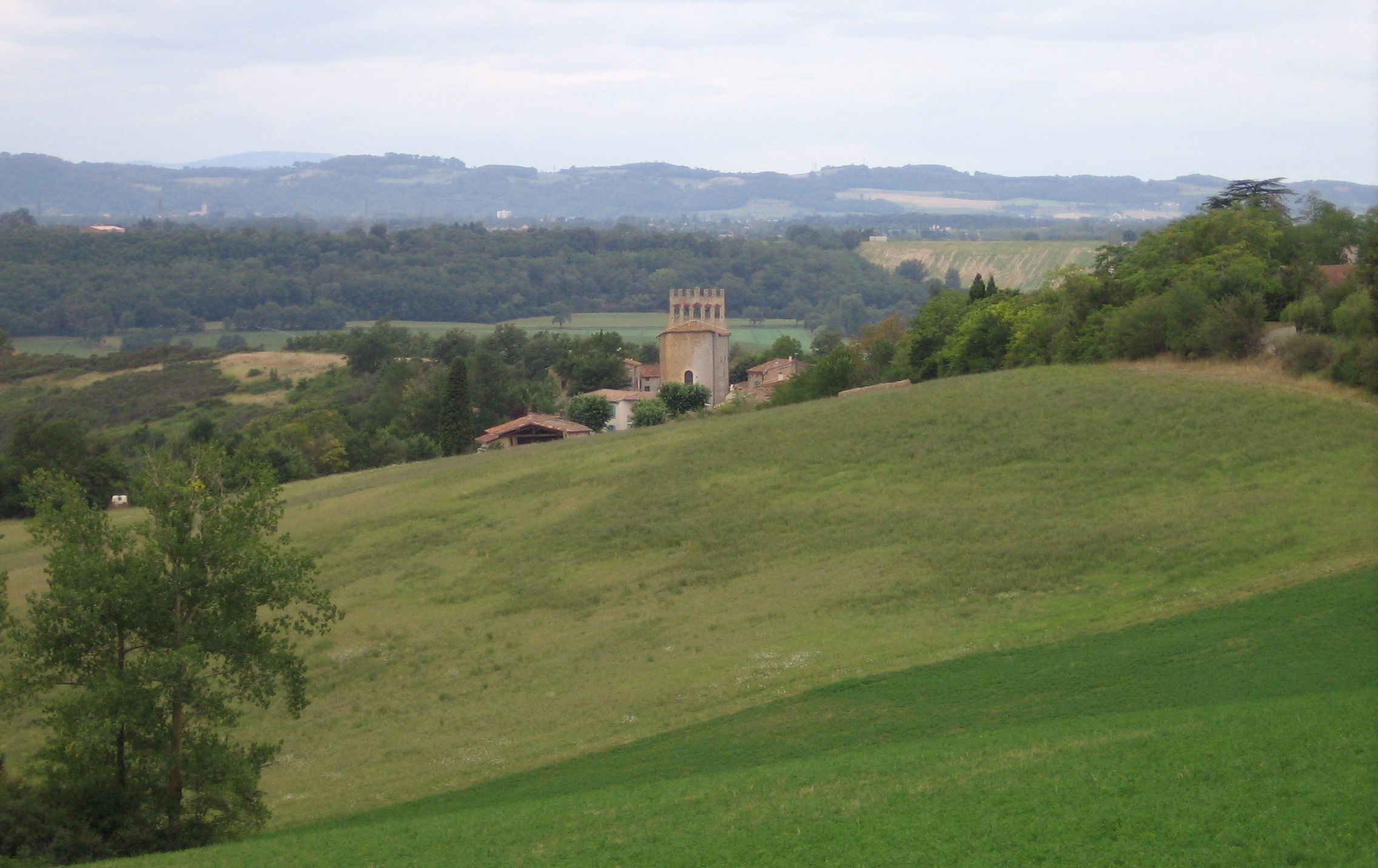
- A view towards Saint-Félix-de-Tournegat

- Coat of arms
- Location of Saint-Félix-de-Tournegat
- Location within France Location within Occitanie
- Coordinates: 43°07′55″N 1°44′57″E
- Country: France
- Region: Occitania
- Department: Ariège
- Arrondissement: Pamiers
- Canton: Mirepoix

Government
  - Mayor (2020–2026): Sébastien Durand
- Area^{1}: 10.51 km^{2} (4.06 sq mi)
- Elevation: 330 m (1,080 ft)
- Highest elevation: 410 m (1,350 ft)
- Lowest elevation: 249 m (817 ft)
- Population (2023): 155
  - Density: 14.7/km^{2} (38.2/sq mi)
- Time zone: UTC+01:00 (CET)
  - Summer (DST): UTC+02:00 (CEST)
- INSEE/Postal code: 09259 /09500
- ^{1} French Land Register data, which excludes lakes, ponds, glaciers > 1 km^{2} (0.386 sq mi or 247 acres) and river estuaries.

Saint-Félix-de-Tournegat (Languedocien: Sant Felitz de Tornagat) is a commune in the Ariège department in southwestern France.

St-Félix-de-Tournegat is a small and rural hilltop village. St Félix de Tournegat includes the hamlets and farms of Barthès, Bel-Fort, Escapat, La Pujolle, Le Paradis, Les Seigneuries, Marvielle, Montagnac, Rigail, and Villerousse.

The village dates from the Iron Age and was occupied during Roman times. The Roman fortified church, dedicated to St Félix in the 13th Century has been beautifully restored, and is now a Classified Historic Monument.

== Population ==
Inhabitants are called Saint-Félixans in French.

Historical population
Year	Pop.	±% p.a.
1968	131	—
1975	88	−5.53%
1982	97	+1.40%
1990	104	+0.87%
1999	117	+1.32%
2007	134	+1.71%
2012	137	+0.44%
2017	142	+0.72%
2023	155	+1.47%
Source: INSEE

== Sights ==
Just outside the village is the Domaine de Montagnac, a converted farm and former Equestrian Centre. Situated in its own private park (with private swimming pool), and with 135 acres (0.55 km^{2}) of land all around, nowadays it has been converted into luxury accommodations.

== See also ==
- Communes of the Ariège department
