= Moulin-Neuf, Ariège =

Commune in Occitanie, France

Moulin-Neuf
- Commune
- Coat of arms
- Location of Moulin-Neuf
- Location within France Location within Occitanie
- Coordinates: 43°04′30″N 1°56′43″E
- Country: France
- Region: Occitania
- Department: Ariège
- Arrondissement: Pamiers
- Canton: Mirepoix
- Intercommunality: Pays de Mirepoix

Government
  - Mayor (2020–2026): Céline Baquer
- Area^{1}: 2.62 km^{2} (1.01 sq mi)
- Elevation: 326 m (1,070 ft)
- Highest elevation: 480 m (1,570 ft)
- Lowest elevation: 307 m (1,007 ft)
- Population (2023): 232
  - Density: 88.5/km^{2} (229/sq mi)
- Time zone: UTC+01:00 (CET)
  - Summer (DST): UTC+02:00 (CEST)
- INSEE/Postal code: 09213 /09500
- ^{1} French Land Register data, which excludes lakes, ponds, glaciers > 1 km^{2} (0.386 sq mi or 247 acres) and river estuaries.

Moulin-Neuf (French pronunciation: [mulɛ̃ nœf]; Occitan: Molin Nòu) is a commune in the Ariège department in southwestern France.

== Population ==
Historical population
Year	Pop.	±% p.a.
1968	172	—
1975	168	−0.34%
1982	135	−3.08%
1990	149	+1.24%
1999	183	+2.31%
2007	191	+0.54%
2012	220	+2.87%
2017	238	+1.59%
2023	232	−0.42%
Source: INSEE

== See also ==
- Communes of the Ariège department
