= Manses =

Commune in Occitanie, France

- Commune
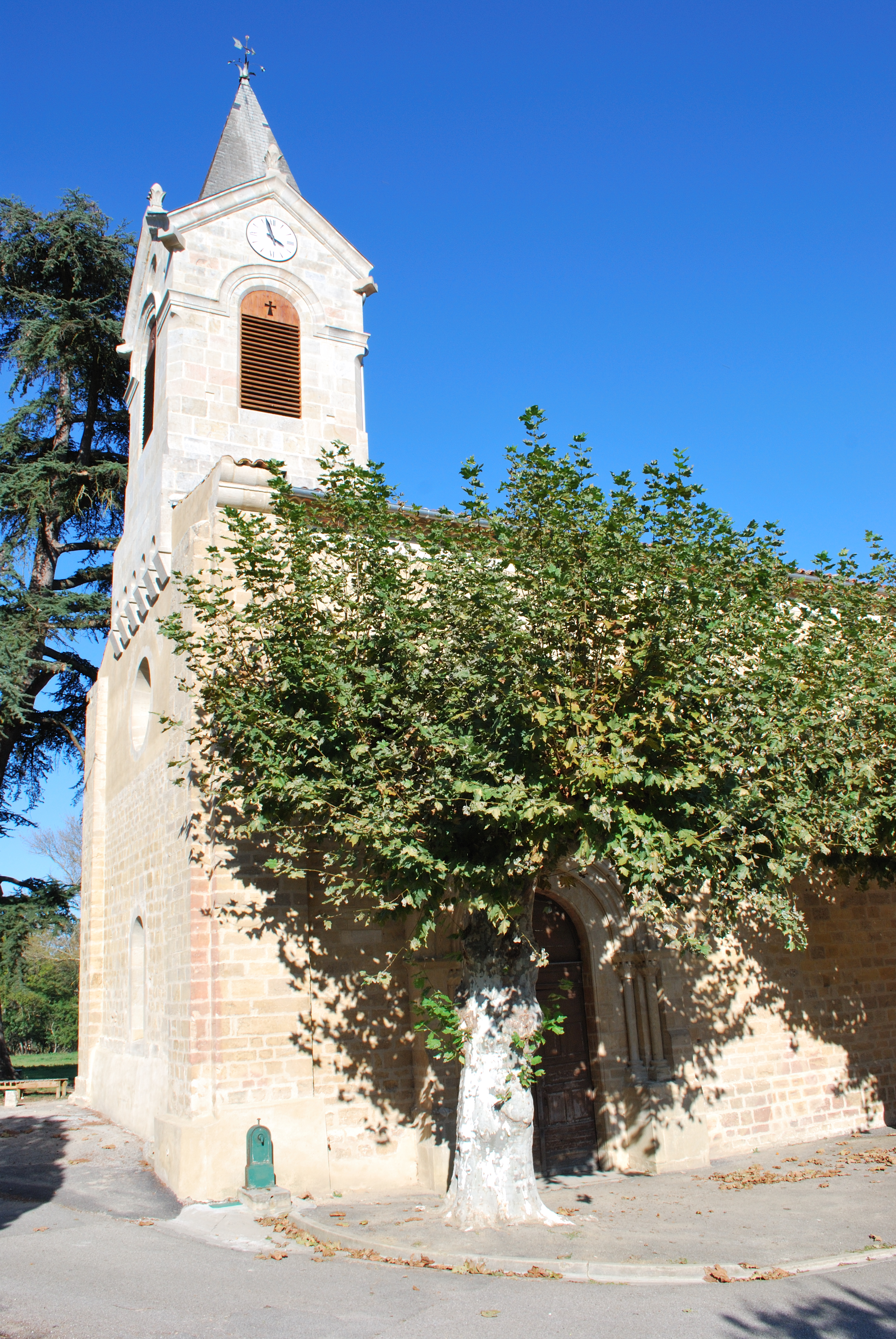
- The church in Manses

- Coat of arms
- Location of Manses
- Location within France Location within Occitanie
- Coordinates: 43°06′04″N 1°48′45″E
- Country: France
- Region: Occitania
- Department: Ariège
- Arrondissement: Pamiers
- Canton: Mirepoix
- Intercommunality: Pays de Mirepoix

Government
  - Mayor (2020–2026): Simone Verdier
- Area^{1}: 15.36 km^{2} (5.93 sq mi)
- Elevation: 240 m (790 ft)
- Highest elevation: 470 m (1,540 ft)
- Lowest elevation: 274 m (899 ft)
- Population (2023): 130
  - Density: 8.5/km^{2} (22/sq mi)
- Time zone: UTC+01:00 (CET)
  - Summer (DST): UTC+02:00 (CEST)
- INSEE/Postal code: 09180 /09500
- ^{1} French Land Register data, which excludes lakes, ponds, glaciers > 1 km^{2} (0.386 sq mi or 247 acres) and river estuaries.

Manses (French pronunciation: [mɑ̃s]; Occitan: Mansas) is a commune in the Ariège department in southwestern France.

== Population ==
Historical population
Year	Pop.	±% p.a.
1968	155	—
1975	139	−1.54%
1982	127	−1.28%
1990	138	+1.04%
1999	123	−1.27%
2007	122	−0.10%
2012	129	+1.12%
2017	126	−0.47%
2023	130	+0.52%
Source: INSEE

== See also ==
- Communes of the Ariège department
