= Saint-Julien-de-Gras-Capou =

Commune in Occitanie, France

- Commune
- Location of Saint-Julien-de-Gras-Capou
- Location within France Location within Occitanie
- Coordinates: 43°02′17″N 1°51′23″E
- Country: France
- Region: Occitania
- Department: Ariège
- Arrondissement: Pamiers
- Canton: Mirepoix
- Intercommunality: Pays de Mirepoix

Government
  - Mayor (2020–2026): Mathilde Deramond
- Area^{1}: 6.14 km^{2} (2.37 sq mi)
- Elevation: 363 m (1,191 ft)
- Highest elevation: 470 m (1,540 ft)
- Lowest elevation: 323 m (1,060 ft)
- Population (2023): 85
  - Density: 14/km^{2} (36/sq mi)
- Time zone: UTC+01:00 (CET)
  - Summer (DST): UTC+02:00 (CEST)
- INSEE/Postal code: 09266 /09500
- ^{1} French Land Register data, which excludes lakes, ponds, glaciers > 1 km^{2} (0.386 sq mi or 247 acres) and river estuaries.

Saint-Julien-de-Gras-Capou (Languedocien: Sant Jolian de Gras Capon) is a commune in the Ariège department in southwestern France.

== Population ==
Inhabitants are called Saint-Julianois in French.

Historical population
Year	Pop.	±% p.a.
1968	84	—
1975	55	−5.87%
1982	56	+0.26%
1990	53	−0.69%
1999	60	+1.39%
2007	70	+1.95%
2012	60	−3.04%
2017	54	−2.09%
2023	85	+7.85%
Source: INSEE

== See also ==
- Communes of the Ariège department
