= Belloc =

- Commune
- Coat of arms
- Location of Belloc
- Location within France Location within Occitanie
- Coordinates: 43°00′51″N 1°55′53″E
- Country: France
- Region: Occitania
- Department: Ariège
- Arrondissement: Pamiers
- Canton: Mirepoix
- Intercommunality: Pays de Mirepoix

Government
  - Mayor (2020–2026): Éric Alard
- Area^{1}: 9.54 km^{2} (3.68 sq mi)
- Elevation: 400 m (1,300 ft)
- Highest elevation: 491 m (1,611 ft)
- Lowest elevation: 345 m (1,132 ft)
- Population (2023): 84
  - Density: 8.8/km^{2} (23/sq mi)
- Time zone: UTC+01:00 (CET)
  - Summer (DST): UTC+02:00 (CEST)
- INSEE/Postal code: 09048 /09600
- ^{1} French Land Register data, which excludes lakes, ponds, glaciers > 1 km^{2} (0.386 sq mi or 247 acres) and river estuaries.

Belloc (French pronunciation: [bɛlɔk]; Occitan: Bèllòc) is a commune in the Ariège department of southwestern France.

It is located between Mirepoix and Foix and sits in the midst of a vast agricultural area.

== Cuisine ==
The region features a robust cuisine including cassoulet and confit de canard and wines including the corbieres, minervois and malepere. The semi-hard ewe's milk cheese Abbaye de Belloc was first made here in the monastery of Notre-Dame de Belloc.

== Population ==
Historical population
Year	Pop.	±% p.a.
1968	54	—
1975	33	−6.79%
1982	55	+7.57%
1990	44	−2.75%
1999	62	+3.88%
2007	65	+0.59%
2012	64	−0.31%
2017	76	+3.50%
2023	84	+1.68%
Source: INSEE

Inhabitants of Belloc are called Bellocois in French.

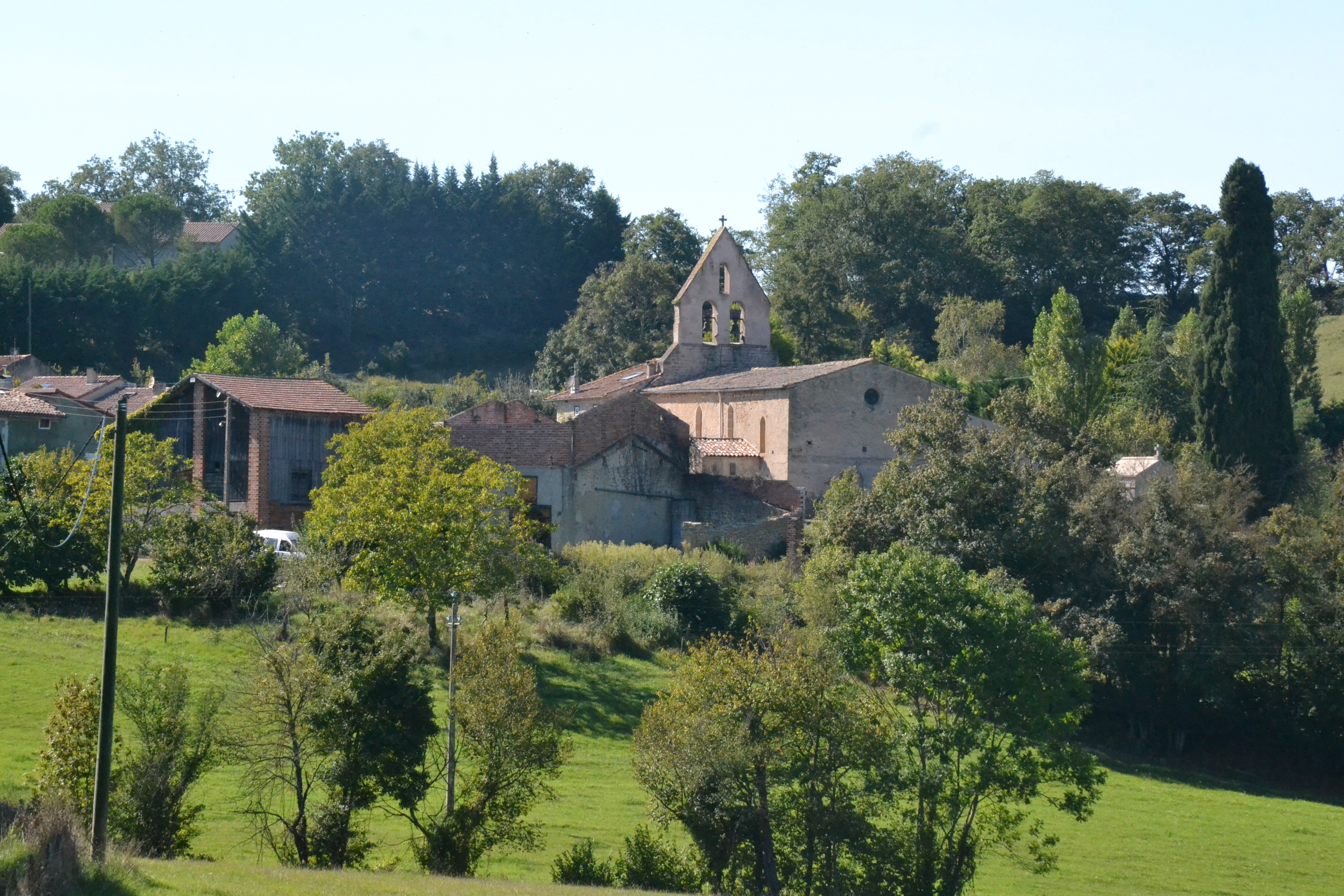
Belloc

== See also ==
- Communes of the Ariège department
