= Viviès =

Commune in Occitanie, France

- Commune
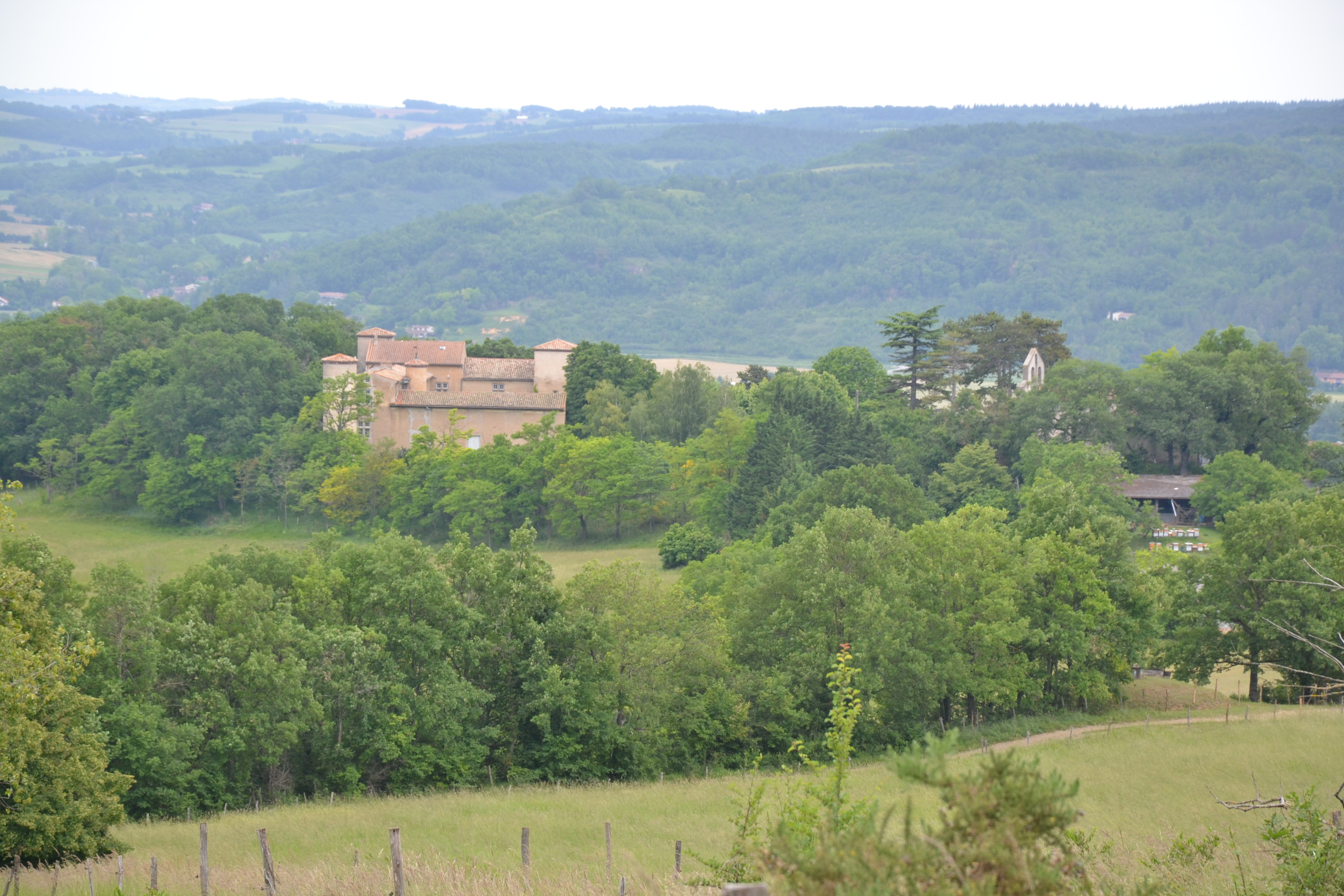
- The Gargas Castle, in Viviès

- Coat of arms
- Location of Viviès
- Location within France Location within Occitanie
- Coordinates: 43°03′52″N 1°47′01″E
- Country: France
- Region: Occitania
- Department: Ariège
- Arrondissement: Pamiers
- Canton: Mirepoix
- Intercommunality: Pays de Mirepoix

Government
  - Mayor (2020–2026): René Dedieu
- Area^{1}: 4.4 km^{2} (1.7 sq mi)
- Elevation: 399 m (1,309 ft)
- Highest elevation: 476 m (1,562 ft)
- Lowest elevation: 291 m (955 ft)
- Population (2023): 150
  - Density: 34/km^{2} (88/sq mi)
- Time zone: UTC+01:00 (CET)
  - Summer (DST): UTC+02:00 (CEST)
- INSEE/Postal code: 09341 /09500
- ^{1} French Land Register data, which excludes lakes, ponds, glaciers > 1 km^{2} (0.386 sq mi or 247 acres) and river estuaries.

Viviès (French pronunciation: [vivjɛs]; Occitan: Vivièrs) is a commune in the Ariège department in southwestern France.

== Population ==
Inhabitants of Viviès are called Viviésois in French.

Historical population
Year	Pop.	±% p.a.
1968	59	—
1975	56	−0.74%
1982	63	+1.70%
1990	62	−0.20%
1999	84	+3.43%
2007	104	+2.71%
2012	130	+4.56%
2017	124	−0.94%
2023	150	+3.22%
Source: INSEE

== See also ==
- Communes of the Ariège department
