= Tabre =

Commune in Occitanie, France

- Commune
- Coat of arms
- Location of Tabre
- Location within France Location within Occitanie
- Coordinates: 42°59′25″N 1°51′36″E
- Country: France
- Region: Occitania
- Department: Ariège
- Arrondissement: Pamiers
- Canton: Mirepoix
- Intercommunality: Pays d'Olmes

Government
  - Mayor (2020–2026): Pascal Serre
- Area^{1}: 2.83 km^{2} (1.09 sq mi)
- Elevation: 450 m (1,480 ft)
- Highest elevation: 641 m (2,103 ft)
- Lowest elevation: 427 m (1,401 ft)
- Population (2023): 351
  - Density: 124/km^{2} (321/sq mi)
- Time zone: UTC+01:00 (CET)
  - Summer (DST): UTC+02:00 (CEST)
- INSEE/Postal code: 09305 /09600
- ^{1} French Land Register data, which excludes lakes, ponds, glaciers > 1 km^{2} (0.386 sq mi or 247 acres) and river estuaries.

Tabre (French pronunciation: [tabʁ]) is a commune in the Ariège department in southwestern France.

== Population ==
Inhabitants of Tabre are called Tabréens in French.

Historical population
Year	Pop.	±% p.a.
1968	42	—
1975	57	+4.46%
1982	299	+26.72%
1990	436	+4.83%
1999	387	−1.32%
2007	355	−1.07%
2012	358	+0.17%
2017	368	+0.55%
2023	351	−0.79%
Source: INSEE

== See also ==
- Communes of the Ariège department
