= Sautel =

Commune in Occitanie, France

- Commune
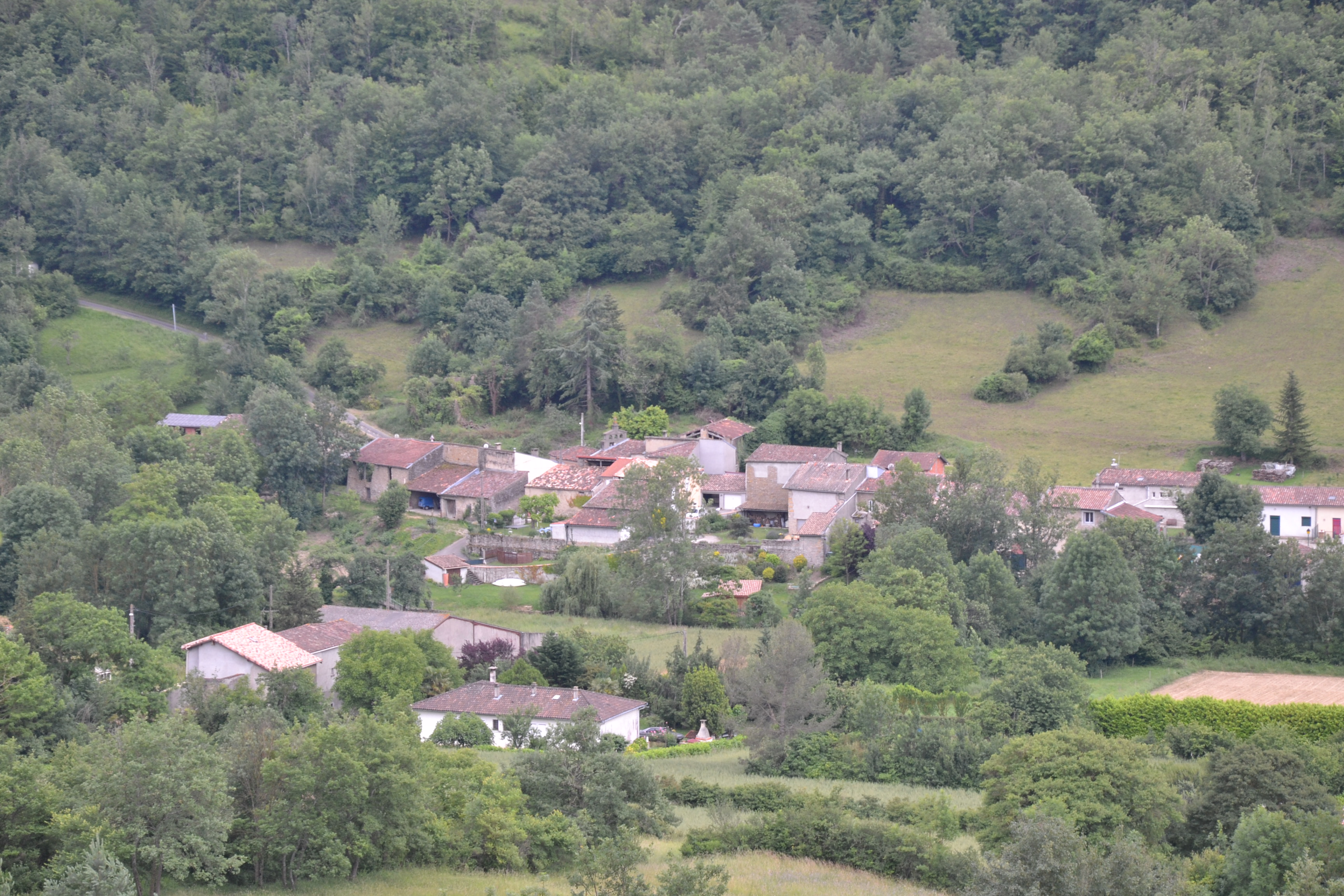
- The view of the village of Sautel

- Coat of arms
- Location of Sautel
- Location within France Location within Occitanie
- Coordinates: 42°58′37″N 1°48′39″E
- Country: France
- Region: Occitania
- Department: Ariège
- Arrondissement: Pamiers
- Canton: Pays d'Olmes
- Intercommunality: Pays d'Olmes

Government
  - Mayor (2020–2026): Richard Moretto
- Area^{1}: 9.13 km^{2} (3.53 sq mi)
- Elevation: 375 m (1,230 ft)
- Highest elevation: 823 m (2,700 ft)
- Lowest elevation: 375 m (1,230 ft)
- Population (2023): 123
  - Density: 13.5/km^{2} (34.9/sq mi)
- Time zone: UTC+01:00 (CET)
  - Summer (DST): UTC+02:00 (CEST)
- INSEE/Postal code: 09281 /09300
- ^{1} French Land Register data, which excludes lakes, ponds, glaciers > 1 km^{2} (0.386 sq mi or 247 acres) and river estuaries.

Sautel (French pronunciation: [sotɛl]; Occitan: Le Sautèlh) is a commune in the Ariège department in southwestern France.

== Population ==
Inhabitants of Sautel are called Sautelois in French.

Historical population
Year	Pop.	±% p.a.
1968	82	—
1975	85	+0.51%
1982	92	+1.14%
1990	105	+1.67%
1999	99	−0.65%
2007	118	+2.22%
2012	122	+0.67%
2017	109	−2.23%
2023	123	+2.03%
Source: INSEE

== See also ==
- Communes of the Ariège department
