= Saint-Jean-du-Falga =

Commune in Occitanie, France

- Commune
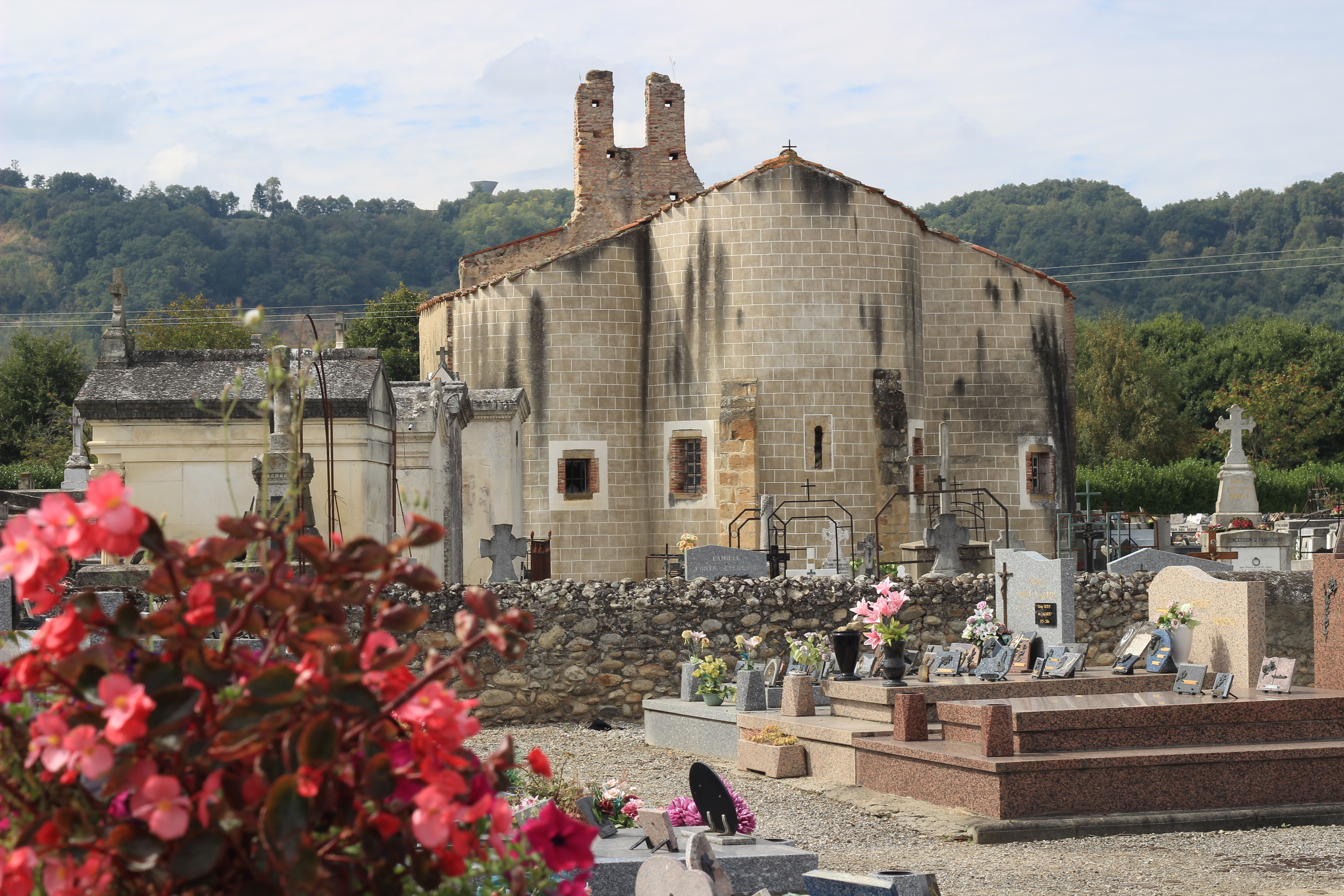
- The chapel in Saint-Jean-du-Falga

- Coat of arms
- Location of Saint-Jean-du-Falga
- Location within France Location within Occitanie
- Coordinates: 43°05′15″N 1°37′44″E
- Country: France
- Region: Occitania
- Department: Ariège
- Arrondissement: Pamiers
- Canton: Pamiers-1

Government
  - Mayor (2020–2026): Michel Doussat
- Area^{1}: 4.03 km^{2} (1.56 sq mi)
- Elevation: 320 m (1,050 ft)
- Highest elevation: 324 m (1,063 ft)
- Lowest elevation: 289 m (948 ft)
- Population (2023): 2,851
  - Density: 707/km^{2} (1,830/sq mi)
- Time zone: UTC+01:00 (CET)
  - Summer (DST): UTC+02:00 (CEST)
- INSEE/Postal code: 09265 /09100
- ^{1} French Land Register data, which excludes lakes, ponds, glaciers > 1 km^{2} (0.386 sq mi or 247 acres) and river estuaries.

Saint-Jean-du-Falga (French pronunciation: [sɛ̃ ʒɑ̃ dy falɡa]; Languedocien: Sant Joan del Falgar) is a commune in the Ariège department in southwestern France.

== Population ==
Inhabitants are called Saint-Jeantais in French.

Historical population
Year	Pop.	±% p.a.
1968	1,071	—
1975	2,011	+9.42%
1982	2,153	+0.98%
1990	2,263	+0.62%
1999	2,276	+0.06%
2007	2,591	+1.63%
2012	2,714	+0.93%
2017	2,934	+1.57%
2023	2,851	−0.48%
Source: INSEE

== See also ==
- Communes of the Ariège department
