= Camon, Ariège =

Commune in Occitanie, France

Camon
- Commune
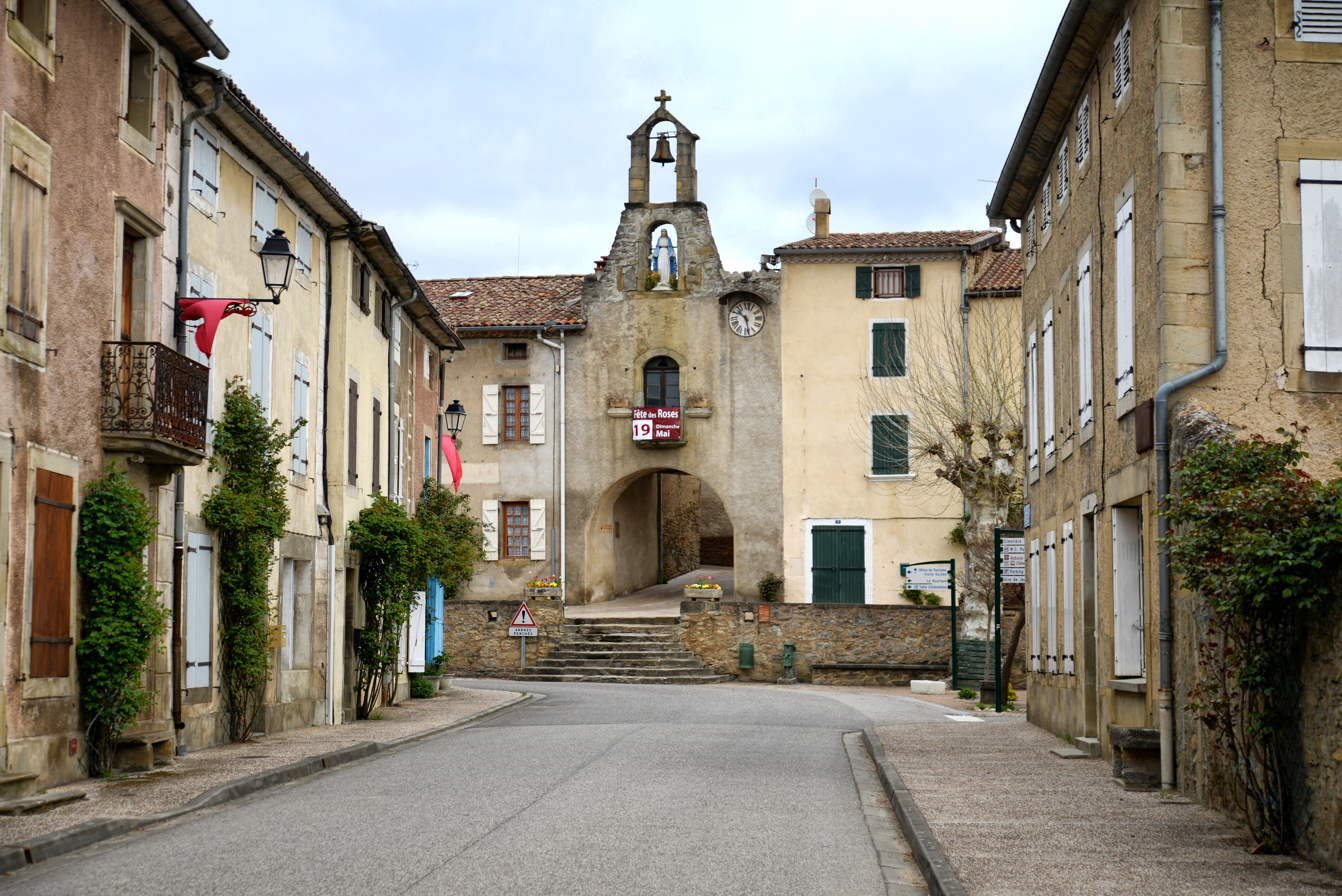
- The main entrance to Camon village

- Coat of arms
- Location of Camon
- Location within France Location within Occitanie
- Coordinates: 43°01′20″N 1°58′03″E
- Country: France
- Region: Occitania
- Department: Ariège
- Arrondissement: Pamiers
- Canton: Mirepoix
- Intercommunality: Pays de Mirepoix

Government
  - Mayor (2020–2026): Sylvie Czeczotka
- Area^{1}: 10.25 km^{2} (3.96 sq mi)
- Highest elevation: 582 m (1,909 ft)
- Lowest elevation: 326 m (1,070 ft)
- Population (2023): 151
  - Density: 14.7/km^{2} (38.2/sq mi)
- Time zone: UTC+01:00 (CET)
  - Summer (DST): UTC+02:00 (CEST)
- INSEE/Postal code: 09074 /09500
- ^{1} French Land Register data, which excludes lakes, ponds, glaciers > 1 km^{2} (0.386 sq mi or 247 acres) and river estuaries.

Camon (French pronunciation: [kamɔ̃]; Occitan: Camon) is a commune in the Ariège department in southwestern France. Nicknamed Little Carcassonne, it is a member of Les Plus Beaux Villages de France (The Most Beautiful Villages of France) Association.

== Population ==
The inhabitants of the town of Camon are called Camonais in French.

Historical population
Year	Pop.	±% p.a.
1968	147	—
1975	116	−3.33%
1982	110	−0.76%
1990	125	+1.61%
1999	144	+1.58%
2007	162	+1.48%
2012	159	−0.37%
2017	143	−2.10%
2023	151	+0.91%
Source: INSEE

== See also ==
- Communes of the Ariège department
