= Escosse =

Commune in Occitanie, France

- Commune
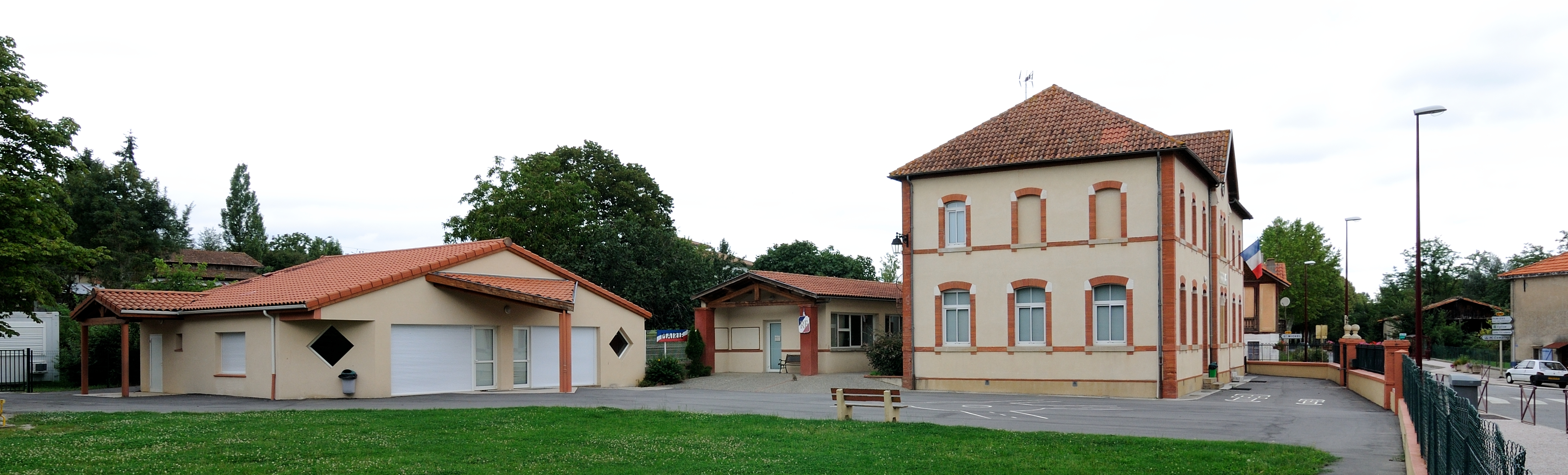
- Town hall and school
- Location of Escosse
- Location within France Location within Occitanie
- Coordinates: 43°07′30″N 1°33′01″E
- Country: France
- Region: Occitania
- Department: Ariège
- Arrondissement: Pamiers
- Canton: Pamiers-1

Government
  - Mayor (2020–2026): Christian Barrière
- Area^{1}: 14.83 km^{2} (5.73 sq mi)
- Elevation: 288 m (945 ft)
- Highest elevation: 416 m (1,365 ft)
- Lowest elevation: 269 m (883 ft)
- Population (2023): 356
  - Density: 24.0/km^{2} (62.2/sq mi)
- Time zone: UTC+01:00 (CET)
  - Summer (DST): UTC+02:00 (CEST)
- INSEE/Postal code: 09116 /09100
- ^{1} French Land Register data, which excludes lakes, ponds, glaciers > 1 km^{2} (0.386 sq mi or 247 acres) and river estuaries.

Escosse (French pronunciation: [ɛskɔs]; Occitan: Escòça) is a commune in the Ariège department in southwestern France.

== Population ==
Inhabitants are called Escossais in French.

Historical population
Year	Pop.	±% p.a.
1968	350	—
1975	324	−1.10%
1982	338	+0.61%
1990	324	−0.53%
1999	348	+0.80%
2007	393	+1.53%
2012	422	+1.43%
2017	417	−0.24%
2023	356	−2.60%
Source: INSEE

== See also ==
- Communes of the Ariège department
