= Bénaix =

Commune in Occitanie, France

- Commune
- Coat of arms
- Location of Bénaix
- Location within France Location within Occitanie
- Coordinates: 42°54′28″N 1°51′38″E
- Country: France
- Region: Occitania
- Department: Ariège
- Arrondissement: Pamiers
- Canton: Pays d'Olmes
- Intercommunality: Pays d'Olmes

Government
  - Mayor (2020–2026): Jean Barrau-Hillot
- Area^{1}: 14.68 km^{2} (5.67 sq mi)
- Elevation: 639 m (2,096 ft)
- Highest elevation: 980 m (3,220 ft)
- Lowest elevation: 517 m (1,696 ft)
- Population (2023): 152
  - Density: 10.4/km^{2} (26.8/sq mi)
- Time zone: UTC+01:00 (CET)
  - Summer (DST): UTC+02:00 (CEST)
- INSEE/Postal code: 09051 /09300
- ^{1} French Land Register data, which excludes lakes, ponds, glaciers > 1 km^{2} (0.386 sq mi or 247 acres) and river estuaries.

Bénaix is a commune in the Ariège department of southwestern France.

== Population ==
Historical population
Year	Pop.	±% p.a.
1968	130	—
1975	153	+2.35%
1982	150	−0.28%
1990	178	+2.16%
1999	164	−0.91%
2007	153	−0.86%
2012	153	+0.00%
2017	147	−0.80%
2023	152	+0.56%
Source: INSEE

Inhabitants of Bénaix are called Bénaixois in French.

== See also ==
- Communes of the Ariège department
