= Limbrassac =

Commune in Occitanie, France

- Commune
- Coat of arms
- Location of Limbrassac
- Location within France Location within Occitanie
- Coordinates: 43°01′07″N 1°50′41″E
- Country: France
- Region: Occitania
- Department: Ariège
- Arrondissement: Pamiers
- Canton: Mirepoix
- Intercommunality: Pays de Mirepoix

Government
  - Mayor (2020–2026): Frédéric Vuillen
- Area^{1}: 12.42 km^{2} (4.80 sq mi)
- Elevation: 400 m (1,300 ft)
- Highest elevation: 642 m (2,106 ft)
- Lowest elevation: 360 m (1,180 ft)
- Population (2023): 117
  - Density: 9.42/km^{2} (24.4/sq mi)
- Time zone: UTC+01:00 (CET)
  - Summer (DST): UTC+02:00 (CEST)
- INSEE/Postal code: 09169 /09600
- ^{1} French Land Register data, which excludes lakes, ponds, glaciers > 1 km^{2} (0.386 sq mi or 247 acres) and river estuaries.

Limbrassac (French pronunciation: [lɛ̃bʁasak]) is a commune in the Ariège department in southwestern France.

== Population ==
Historical population
Year	Pop.	±% p.a.
1968	63	—
1975	60	−0.69%
1982	80	+4.20%
1990	80	+0.00%
1999	98	+2.28%
2007	115	+2.02%
2012	106	−1.62%
2017	133	+4.64%
2023	117	−2.11%
Source: INSEE

== See also ==
- Communes of the Ariège department
