= Dun, Ariège =

Commune in Occitanie, France

Dun
- Commune
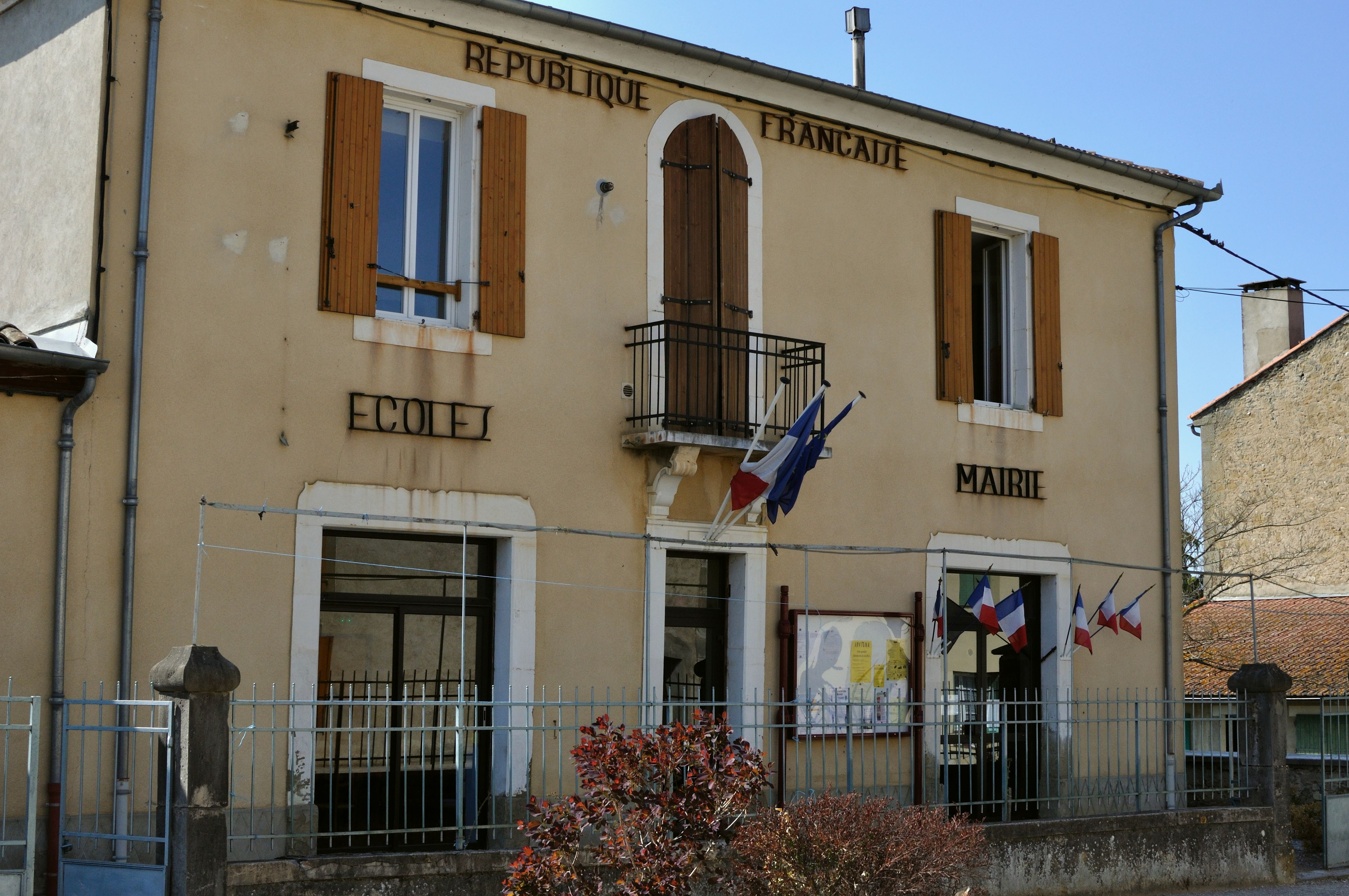
- School and town hall

- Coat of arms
- Location of Dun
- Location within France Location within Occitanie
- Coordinates: 43°01′42″N 1°47′59″E
- Country: France
- Region: Occitania
- Department: Ariège
- Arrondissement: Pamiers
- Canton: Mirepoix
- Intercommunality: Pays de Mirepoix

Government
  - Mayor (2020–2026): Florent Pauly
- Area^{1}: 41.41 km^{2} (15.99 sq mi)
- Elevation: 331 m (1,086 ft)
- Highest elevation: 648 m (2,126 ft)
- Lowest elevation: 303 m (994 ft)
- Population (2023): 657
  - Density: 15.9/km^{2} (41.1/sq mi)
- Time zone: UTC+01:00 (CET)
  - Summer (DST): UTC+02:00 (CEST)
- INSEE/Postal code: 09107 /09600
- ^{1} French Land Register data, which excludes lakes, ponds, glaciers > 1 km^{2} (0.386 sq mi or 247 acres) and river estuaries.

Dun (French pronunciation: [dœ̃]) is a commune in the Ariège department in the Occitanie region in southwestern France. In 1973, the commune Dun was expanded with the former communes Merviel, Engraviès and Senesse-de-Senabugue.

== Population ==
Historical population
Year	Pop.	±% p.a.
1968	429	—
1975	394	−1.21%
1982	401	+0.25%
1990	394	−0.22%
1999	491	+2.48%
2007	566	+1.79%
2012	558	−0.28%
2017	586	+0.98%
2023	657	+1.92%
Source: INSEE

== See also ==
- Communes of the Ariège department
