= Les Issards =

Commune in Occitanie, France

- Commune
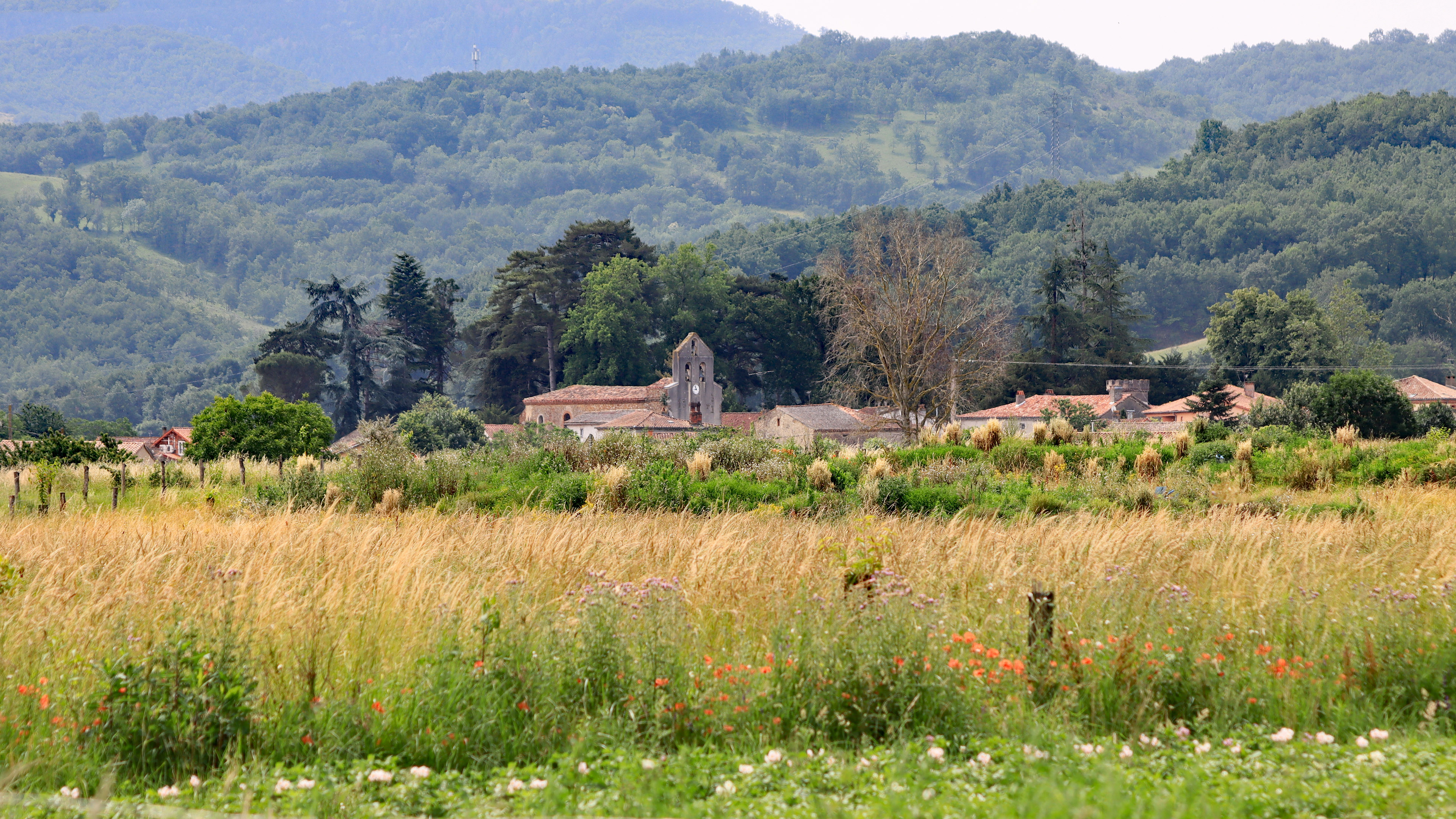
- View of the village of Issards

- Coat of arms
- Location of Les Issards
- Location within France Location within Occitanie
- Coordinates: 43°04′46″N 1°44′11″E
- Country: France
- Region: Occitania
- Department: Ariège
- Arrondissement: Pamiers
- Canton: Pamiers-2
- Intercommunality: Portes d'Ariège Pyrénées

Government
  - Mayor (2020–2026): Serge Robert
- Area^{1}: 3.81 km^{2} (1.47 sq mi)
- Elevation: 300 m (980 ft)
- Highest elevation: 383 m (1,257 ft)
- Lowest elevation: 270 m (890 ft)
- Population (2023): 250
  - Density: 66/km^{2} (170/sq mi)
- Time zone: UTC+01:00 (CET)
  - Summer (DST): UTC+02:00 (CEST)
- INSEE/Postal code: 09145 /09100
- ^{1} French Land Register data, which excludes lakes, ponds, glaciers > 1 km^{2} (0.386 sq mi or 247 acres) and river estuaries.

Les Issards (French pronunciation: [le.z‿isaʁ]; Occitan: Les Eissarts) is a commune in the Ariège department in southwestern France.

== Population ==
Historical population
Year	Pop.	±% p.a.
1968	152	—
1975	144	−0.77%
1982	147	+0.29%
1990	186	+2.99%
1999	189	+0.18%
2007	238	+2.92%
2012	258	+1.63%
2017	236	−1.77%
2023	250	+0.97%
Source: INSEE

== See also ==
- Communes of the Ariège department
