= Roumengoux =

Commune in Occitanie, France

- Commune
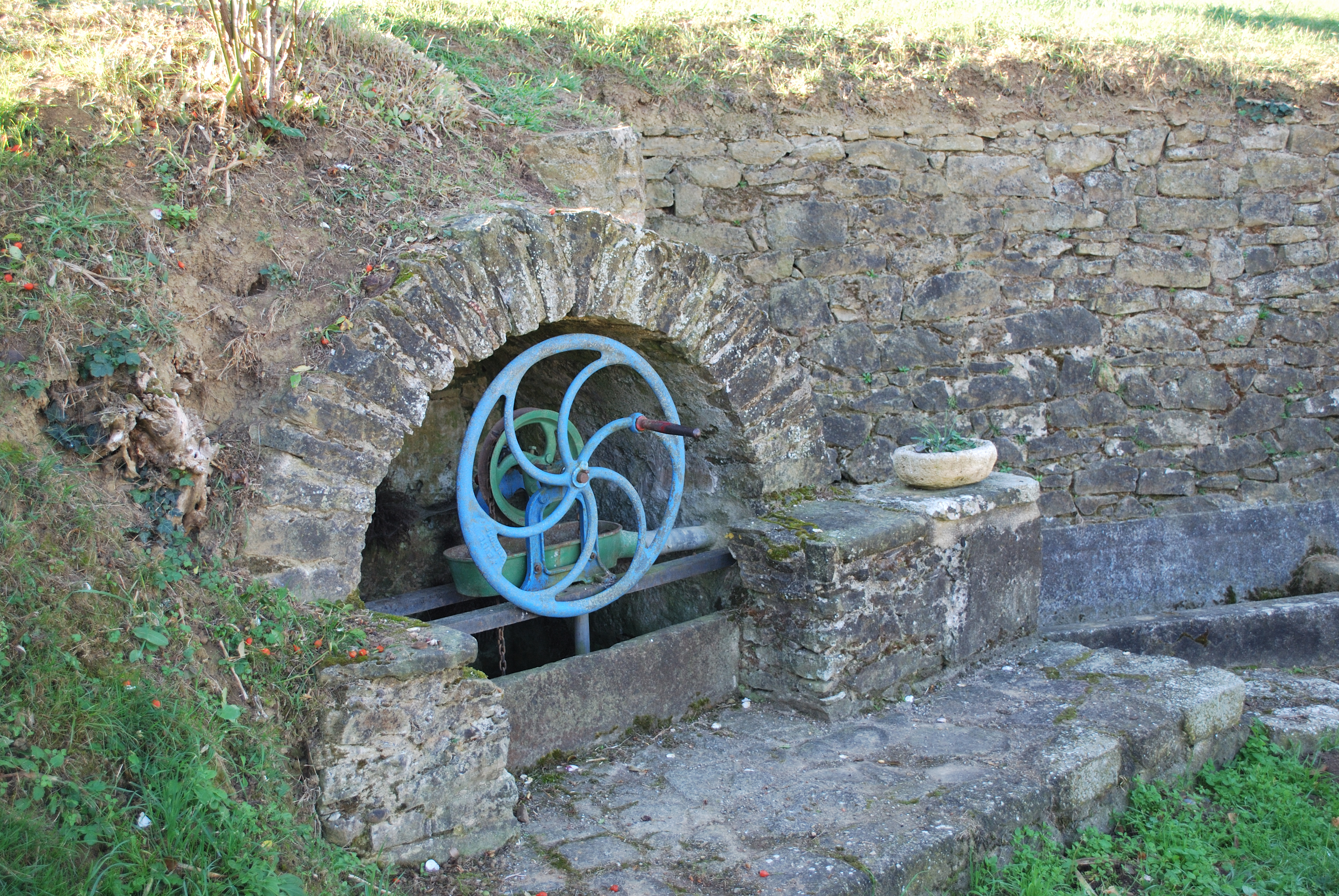
- The fountain in Roumengoux
- Location of Roumengoux
- Location within France Location within Occitanie
- Coordinates: 43°04′21″N 1°56′06″E
- Country: France
- Region: Occitania
- Department: Ariège
- Arrondissement: Pamiers
- Canton: Mirepoix
- Intercommunality: Pays de Mirepoix

Government
  - Mayor (2020–2026): Anthony Crouzet
- Area^{1}: 6.87 km^{2} (2.65 sq mi)
- Elevation: 319 m (1,047 ft)
- Highest elevation: 461 m (1,512 ft)
- Lowest elevation: 304 m (997 ft)
- Population (2023): 172
  - Density: 25.0/km^{2} (64.8/sq mi)
- Time zone: UTC+01:00 (CET)
  - Summer (DST): UTC+02:00 (CEST)
- INSEE/Postal code: 09251 /09500
- ^{1} French Land Register data, which excludes lakes, ponds, glaciers > 1 km^{2} (0.386 sq mi or 247 acres) and river estuaries.

Roumengoux is a commune in the Ariège department in southwestern France.

== Population ==
Inhabitants of Roumengoux are called Roumengosiens in French.

Historical population
Year	Pop.	±% p.a.
1968	121	—
1975	78	−6.08%
1982	116	+5.83%
1990	115	−0.11%
1999	127	+1.11%
2007	145	+1.67%
2012	167	+2.87%
2017	166	−0.12%
2023	172	+0.59%
Source: INSEE

== See also ==
- Communes of the Ariège department
