= Le Peyrat =

Commune in Occitanie, France

- Commune
- Coat of arms
- Location of Le Peyrat
- Location within France Location within Occitanie
- Coordinates: 42°57′27″N 1°55′17″E
- Country: France
- Region: Occitania
- Department: Ariège
- Arrondissement: Pamiers
- Canton: Mirepoix
- Intercommunality: Pays de Mirepoix

Government
  - Mayor (2020–2026): Alain Boulbes
- Area^{1}: 6.13 km^{2} (2.37 sq mi)
- Elevation: 450 m (1,480 ft)
- Highest elevation: 763 m (2,503 ft)
- Lowest elevation: 406 m (1,332 ft)
- Population (2023): 495
  - Density: 80.8/km^{2} (209/sq mi)
- Time zone: UTC+01:00 (CET)
  - Summer (DST): UTC+02:00 (CEST)
- INSEE/Postal code: 09229 /09600
- ^{1} French Land Register data, which excludes lakes, ponds, glaciers > 1 km^{2} (0.386 sq mi or 247 acres) and river estuaries.

Le Peyrat is a commune in the Ariège department in southwestern France.

== Population ==
Inhabitants of Le Peyrat are called Peyratais in French.

Historical population
Year	Pop.	±% p.a.
1968	373	—
1975	353	−0.78%
1982	410	+2.16%
1990	401	−0.28%
1999	456	+1.44%
2007	479	+0.62%
2012	482	+0.12%
2017	473	−0.38%
2023	495	+0.76%
Source: INSEE

== See also ==
- Communes of the Ariège department
