= Pradettes =

Commune in Occitanie, France

- Commune
- Coat of arms
- Location of Pradettes
- Location within France Location within Occitanie
- Coordinates: 42°59′27″N 1°49′15″E
- Country: France
- Region: Occitania
- Department: Ariège
- Arrondissement: Pamiers
- Canton: Mirepoix
- Intercommunality: Pays de Mirepoix

Government
  - Mayor (2020–2026): Francis Bonnet
- Area^{1}: 3.52 km^{2} (1.36 sq mi)
- Elevation: 526 m (1,726 ft)
- Highest elevation: 582 m (1,909 ft)
- Lowest elevation: 417 m (1,368 ft)
- Population (2023): 43
  - Density: 12/km^{2} (32/sq mi)
- Time zone: UTC+01:00 (CET)
  - Summer (DST): UTC+02:00 (CEST)
- INSEE/Postal code: 09233 /09600
- ^{1} French Land Register data, which excludes lakes, ponds, glaciers > 1 km^{2} (0.386 sq mi or 247 acres) and river estuaries.

Pradettes (French pronunciation: [pʁadɛt]; Occitan: Pradetas) is a commune in the Ariège department in southwestern France.

== Population ==
Inhabitants are called Pradettois in French.

Historical population
Year	Pop.	±% p.a.
1968	11	—
1975	7	−6.25%
1982	29	+22.51%
1990	42	+4.74%
1999	37	−1.40%
2007	36	−0.34%
2012	41	+2.64%
2017	50	+4.05%
2023	43	−2.48%
Source: INSEE

== See also ==
- Communes of the Ariège department
