= Esclagne =

Commune in Occitanie, France

- Commune
- Coat of arms
- Location of Esclagne
- Location within France Location within Occitanie
- Coordinates: 42°58′54″N 1°50′56″E
- Country: France
- Region: Occitania
- Department: Ariège
- Arrondissement: Pamiers
- Canton: Mirepoix
- Intercommunality: Pays de Mirepoix

Government
  - Mayor (2020–2026): Mariette Rouge
- Area^{1}: 3.52 km^{2} (1.36 sq mi)
- Elevation: 420 m (1,380 ft)
- Highest elevation: 565 m (1,854 ft)
- Lowest elevation: 444 m (1,457 ft)
- Population (2023): 119
  - Density: 33.8/km^{2} (87.6/sq mi)
- Time zone: UTC+01:00 (CET)
  - Summer (DST): UTC+02:00 (CEST)
- INSEE/Postal code: 09115 /09600
- ^{1} French Land Register data, which excludes lakes, ponds, glaciers > 1 km^{2} (0.386 sq mi or 247 acres) and river estuaries.

Esclagne (French pronunciation: [ɛsklaɲ]; Occitan: Esclanha) is a commune in the Ariège department in southwestern France.

== Population ==
Historical population
Year	Pop.	±% p.a.
1968	77	—
1975	70	−1.35%
1982	116	+7.48%
1990	155	+3.69%
1999	142	−0.97%
2007	109	−3.25%
2012	112	+0.54%
2017	146	+5.45%
2023	119	−3.35%
Source: INSEE

== See also ==
- Communes of the Ariège department
