= Saint-Jean-d'Aigues-Vives =

Commune in Occitanie, France

- Commune
- Location of Saint-Jean-d'Aigues-Vives
- Location within France Location within Occitanie
- Coordinates: 42°55′31″N 1°52′12″E
- Country: France
- Region: Occitania
- Department: Ariège
- Arrondissement: Pamiers
- Canton: Pays d'Olmes
- Intercommunality: Pays d'Olmes

Government
  - Mayor (2020–2026): Jean-Louis Rossi
- Area^{1}: 4.52 km^{2} (1.75 sq mi)
- Elevation: 555 m (1,821 ft)
- Highest elevation: 767 m (2,516 ft)
- Lowest elevation: 482 m (1,581 ft)
- Population (2023): 367
  - Density: 81.2/km^{2} (210/sq mi)
- Time zone: UTC+01:00 (CET)
  - Summer (DST): UTC+02:00 (CEST)
- INSEE/Postal code: 09262 /09300
- ^{1} French Land Register data, which excludes lakes, ponds, glaciers > 1 km^{2} (0.386 sq mi or 247 acres) and river estuaries.

Saint-Jean-d'Aigues-Vives (French pronunciation: [sɛ̃ ʒɑ̃ dɛɡ viv]; Languedocien: Sant Joan d'Aigasvivas) is a commune in the Ariège department in southwestern France.

== Population ==
Inhabitants are called Saint-Jeantéens in French.

Historical population
Year	Pop.	±% p.a.
1968	102	—
1975	171	+7.66%
1982	393	+12.62%
1990	477	+2.45%
1999	430	−1.15%
2007	408	−0.65%
2012	405	−0.15%
2017	387	−0.91%
2023	367	−0.88%
Source: INSEE

== See also ==
- Communes of the Ariège department
