= Rieucros =

Commune in Occitanie, France

- Commune
- Coat of arms
- Location of Rieucros
- Location within France Location within Occitanie
- Coordinates: 43°05′07″N 1°46′04″E
- Country: France
- Region: Occitania
- Department: Ariège
- Arrondissement: Pamiers
- Canton: Mirepoix

Government
  - Mayor (2020–2026): André Roques
- Area^{1}: 5.57 km^{2} (2.15 sq mi)
- Elevation: 281 m (922 ft)
- Highest elevation: 433 m (1,421 ft)
- Lowest elevation: 263 m (863 ft)
- Population (2023): 718
  - Density: 129/km^{2} (334/sq mi)
- Time zone: UTC+01:00 (CET)
  - Summer (DST): UTC+02:00 (CEST)
- INSEE/Postal code: 09244 /09500
- ^{1} French Land Register data, which excludes lakes, ponds, glaciers > 1 km^{2} (0.386 sq mi or 247 acres) and river estuaries.

Rieucros (French pronunciation: [ʁjœkʁɔs]; Occitan: Riucròs) is a commune in the Ariège department in southwestern France.

== Population ==
Inhabitants are called Rieucrosains in French.

Historical population
Year	Pop.	±% p.a.
1968	363	—
1975	354	−0.36%
1982	387	+1.28%
1990	403	+0.51%
1999	437	+0.90%
2007	564	+3.24%
2012	648	+2.82%
2017	702	+1.61%
2023	718	+0.38%
Source: INSEE

== See also ==
- Communes of the Ariège department
