= Communes of the Ariège department =

The following is a list of the 325 communes of the Ariège department of France.

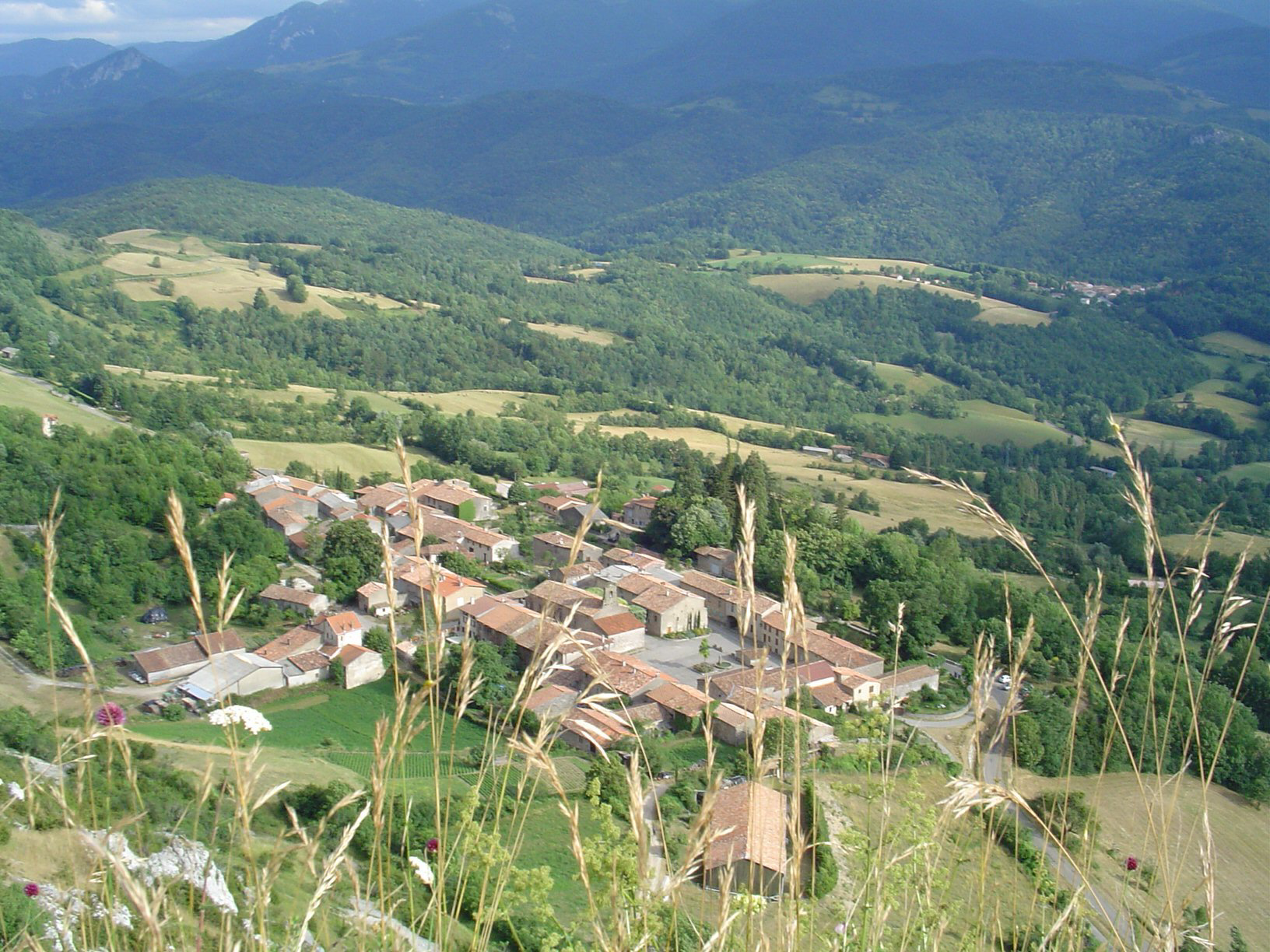

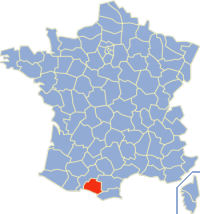

The communes cooperate in the following intercommunalities (as of 2025):

- Communauté d'agglomération Pays Foix-Varilhes
- Communauté de communes Arize Lèze
- Communauté de communes Couserans-Pyrénées
- Communauté de communes de la Haute-Ariège
- Communauté de communes du Pays de Mirepoix
- Communauté de communes du Pays d'Olmes
- Communauté de communes du Pays de Tarascon
- Communauté de communes des Portes d'Ariège Pyrénées

INSEE	Postal	Commune
09001	09240	Aigues-Juntes
09002	09600	Aigues-Vives
09003	09300	L'Aiguillon
09004	09310	Albiès
09005	09320	Aleu
09006	09400	Alliat
09007	09240	Allières
09008	09200	Alos
09009	09240	Alzen
09011	09800	Antras
09012	09250	Appy
09013	09000	Arabaux
09014	09800	Argein
09015	09400	Arignac
09016	09400	Arnave
09017	09800	Arrien-en-Bethmale
09018	09800	Arrout
09019	09130	Artigat
09020	09460	Artigues
09021	09120	Artix
09022	09100	Arvigna
09023	09110	Ascou
09024	09310	Aston
09025	09800	Aucazein
09026	09800	Audressein
09027	09800	Augirein
09296	09310	Aulos-Sinsat
09029	09140	Aulus-les-Bains
09030	09220	Auzat
09031	09250	Axiat
09032	09110	Ax-les-Thermes
09033	09230	Bagert
09034	09800	Balacet
09035	09800	Balaguères
09037	09230	Barjac
09038	09350	La Bastide-de-Besplas
09039	09500	La Bastide-de-Bousignac
09040	09700	La Bastide-de-Lordat
09042	09240	La Bastide-de-Sérou
09041	09160	La Bastide-du-Salat
09043	09600	La Bastide-sur-l'Hers
09044	09000	Baulou
09045	09400	Bédeilhac-et-Aynat
09046	09230	Bédeille
09047	09300	Bélesta
09048	09600	Belloc
09049	09000	Bénac
09050	09100	Benagues
09051	09300	Bénaix
09052	09500	Besset
09053	09250	Bestiac
09054	09160	Betchat
09055	09800	Bethmale
09056	09100	Bézac
09057	09320	Biert
09058	09400	Bompas
09059	09800	Bonac-Irazein
09060	09100	Bonnac
09061	09350	Les Bordes-sur-Arize
09062	09800	Bordes-Uchentein
09063	09000	Le Bosc
09064	09310	Bouan
09065	09320	Boussenac
09066	09000	Brassac
09067	09700	Brie
09068	09000	Burret
09069	09800	Buzan
09070	09310	Les Cabannes
09071	09240	Cadarcet
09072	09120	Calzan
09073	09290	Camarade
09074	09500	Camon
09075	09350	Campagne-sur-Arize
09076	09700	Canté
09077	09400	Capoulet-et-Junac
09078	09460	Carcanières
09079	09130	Carla-Bayle
09080	09300	Carla-de-Roquefort
09081	09100	Le Carlaret
09082	09420	Castelnau-Durban
09083	09130	Castéras
09084	09350	Castex
09085	09800	Castillon-en-Couserans
09086	09160	Caumont
09087	09250	Caussou
09088	09250	Caychax-et-Senconac
09089	09500	Cazals-des-Baylès
09090	09120	Cazaux
09091	09160	Cazavet
09092	09400	Cazenave-Serres-et-Allens
09093	09000	Celles
09094	09230	Cérizols
09095	09800	Cescau
09096	09310	Château-Verdun
09097	09420	Clermont
09098	09230	Contrazy
09099	09000	Cos
09100	09140	Couflens
09101	09120	Coussa
09102	09500	Coutens
09103	09120	Crampagna
09104	09120	Dalou
09105	09350	Daumazan-sur-Arize
09106	09300	Dreuilhe
09107	09600	Dun
09108	09240	Durban-sur-Arize
09109	09130	Durfort
09110	09200	Encourtiech
09111	09800	Engomer
09113	09140	Ercé
09114	09200	Erp
09115	09600	Esclagne
09116	09100	Escosse
09117	09700	Esplas
09118	09420	Esplas-de-Sérou
09119	09200	Eycheil
09120	09230	Fabas
09121	09000	Ferrières-sur-Ariège
09122	09000	Foix
09123	09350	Fornex
09124	09130	Le Fossat
09125	09300	Fougax-et-Barrineuf
09126	09300	Freychenet
09127	09290	Gabre
09128	09190	Gajan
09129	09800	Galey
09130	09000	Ganac
09131	09250	Garanou
09132	09700	Gaudiès
09133	09400	Génat
09134	09220	Gestiès
09136	09400	Gourbit
09137	09120	Gudas
09138	09000	L'Herm
09139	09390	L'Hospitalet-près-l'Andorre
09140	09110	Ignaux
09142	09300	Ilhat
09141	09800	Illartein
09143	09220	Illier-et-Laramade
09145	09100	Les Issards
09146	09700	Justiniac
09147	09700	Labatut
09148	09160	Lacave
09149	09200	Lacourt
09150	09500	Lagarde
09151	09130	Lanoux
09152	09400	Lapège
09153	09500	Lapenne
09154	09240	Larbont
09155	09310	Larcat
09156	09310	Larnat
09157	09600	Laroque-d'Olmes
09158	09230	Lasserre
09159	09310	Lassur
09160	09300	Lavelanet
09161	09600	Léran
09162	09220	Lercoul
09163	09100	Lescousse
09164	09420	Lescure
09165	09300	Lesparrou
09166	09300	Leychert
09167	09210	Lézat-sur-Lèze
09168	09300	Lieurac
09169	09600	Limbrassac
09170	09700	Lissac

INSEE	Postal	Commune
09171	09250	Lordat
09289	09190	Lorp-Sentaraille
09172	09350	Loubaut
09173	09120	Loubens
09174	09000	Loubières
09175	09100	Ludiès
09176	09250	Luzenac
09177	09100	Madière
09178	09500	Malegoude
09179	09120	Malléon
09180	09500	Manses
09181	09290	Le Mas-d'Azil
09182	09320	Massat
09183	09160	Mauvezin-de-Prat
09184	09230	Mauvezin-de-Sainte-Croix
09185	09270	Mazères
09186	09350	Méras
09187	09160	Mercenac
09188	09400	Mercus-Garrabet
09189	09110	Mérens-les-Vals
09190	09230	Mérigon
09192	09400	Miglos
09193	09460	Mijanès
09194	09500	Mirepoix
09195	09130	Monesple
09196	09240	Montagagne
09197	09110	Montaillou
09198	09230	Montardit
09199	09700	Montaut
09200	09600	Montbel
09201	09200	Montégut-en-Couserans
09202	09120	Montégut-Plantaurel
09203	09240	Montels
09204	09200	Montesquieu-Avantès
09205	09350	Montfa
09206	09300	Montferrier
09207	09330	Montgailhard
09208	09160	Montgauch
09209	09200	Montjoie-en-Couserans
09210	09000	Montoulieu
09211	09300	Montségur
09212	09240	Montseron
09213	09500	Moulin-Neuf
09214	09200	Moulis
09215	09300	Nalzen
09216	09240	Nescus
09217	09400	Niaux
09218	09110	Orgeix
09219	09800	Orgibet
09220	09110	Orlu
09221	09400	Ornolac-Ussat-les-Bains
09222	09220	Orus
09223	09140	Oust
09224	09130	Pailhès
09225	09100	Pamiers
09226	09310	Pech
09227	09300	Péreille
09228	09110	Perles-et-Castelet
09229	09600	Le Peyrat
09230	09460	Le Pla
09231	09320	Le Port
09232	09110	Prades
09233	09600	Pradettes
09234	09000	Pradières
09235	09160	Prat-Bonrepaux
09236	09000	Prayols
09237	09460	Le Puch
09238	09100	Les Pujols
09239	09460	Quérigut
09240	09400	Quié
09241	09400	Rabat-les-Trois-Seigneurs
09242	09300	Raissac
09243	09600	Régat
09244	09500	Rieucros
09245	09120	Rieux-de-Pelleport
09246	09420	Rimont
09247	09200	Rivèrenert
09249	09300	Roquefixade
09250	09300	Roquefort-les-Cascades
09251	09500	Roumengoux
09252	09460	Rouze
09253	09350	Sabarat
09254	09100	Saint-Amadou
09256	09120	Saint-Bauzeil
09257	09230	Sainte-Croix-Volvestre
09260	09500	Sainte-Foi
09342	09130	Sainte-Suzanne
09258	09120	Saint-Félix-de-Rieutord
09259	09500	Saint-Félix-de-Tournegat
09261	09200	Saint-Girons
09262	09300	Saint-Jean-d'Aigues-Vives
09264	09000	Saint-Jean-de-Verges
09263	09800	Saint-Jean-du-Castillonnais
09265	09100	Saint-Jean-du-Falga
09266	09500	Saint-Julien-de-Gras-Capou
09267	09800	Saint-Lary
09268	09190	Saint-Lizier
09269	09000	Saint-Martin-de-Caralp
09270	09100	Saint-Martin-d'Oydes
09271	09100	Saint-Michel
09272	09000	Saint-Paul-de-Jarrat
09273	09000	Saint-Pierre-de-Rivière
09274	09500	Saint-Quentin-la-Tour
09275	09700	Saint-Quirc
09276	09100	Saint-Victor-Rouzaud
09277	09210	Saint-Ybars
09279	09800	Salsein
09280	09400	Saurat
09281	09300	Sautel
09282	09700	Saverdun
09283	09110	Savignac-les-Ormeaux
09284	09120	Ségura
09285	09140	Seix
09290	09800	Sentein
09292	09240	Sentenac-de-Sérou
09291	09140	Sentenac-d'Oust
09293	09000	Serres-sur-Arget
09294	09130	Sieuras
09295	09220	Siguer
09297	09800	Sor
09298	09110	Sorgeat
09299	09140	Soueix-Rogalle
09300	09000	Soula
09301	09320	Soulan
09303	09400	Surba
09304	09240	Suzan
09305	09600	Tabre
09306	09400	Tarascon-sur-Ariège
09307	09160	Taurignan-Castet
09308	09190	Taurignan-Vieux
09309	09500	Teilhet
09310	09350	Thouars-sur-Arize
09311	09110	Tignac
09312	09100	La Tour-du-Crieu
09313	09230	Tourtouse
09314	09500	Tourtrol
09315	09700	Trémoulet
09316	09500	Troye-d'Ariège
09318	09250	Unac
09319	09100	Unzent
09320	09310	Urs
09321	09400	Ussat
09322	09140	Ustou
09334	09220	Val-de-Sos
09323	09500	Vals
09324	09120	Varilhes
09325	09110	Vaychis
09326	09310	Vèbre
09327	09120	Ventenac
09328	09310	Verdun
09329	09000	Vernajoul
09330	09250	Vernaux
09331	09700	Le Vernet
09332	09340	Verniolle
09335	09800	Villeneuve
09336	09300	Villeneuve-d'Olmes
09338	09130	Villeneuve-du-Latou
09339	09100	Villeneuve-du-Paréage
09340	09120	Vira
09341	09500	Viviès
