= Unzent =

Commune in Occitanie, France

- Commune
- Location of Unzent
- Location within France Location within Occitanie
- Coordinates: 43°10′32″N 1°31′43″E
- Country: France
- Region: Occitania
- Department: Ariège
- Arrondissement: Pamiers
- Canton: Pamiers-1

Government
  - Mayor (2020–2026): Bernard Séjourné
- Area^{1}: 7.9 km^{2} (3.1 sq mi)
- Elevation: 325 m (1,066 ft)
- Highest elevation: 410 m (1,350 ft)
- Lowest elevation: 265 m (869 ft)
- Population (2023): 122
  - Density: 15/km^{2} (40/sq mi)
- Time zone: UTC+01:00 (CET)
  - Summer (DST): UTC+02:00 (CEST)
- INSEE/Postal code: 09319 /09100
- ^{1} French Land Register data, which excludes lakes, ponds, glaciers > 1 km^{2} (0.386 sq mi or 247 acres) and river estuaries.

Unzent is a commune in the Ariège department in southwestern France.

== Population ==
Historical population
| Year | Pop. | ±% p.a. |
|---|---|---|
| 1968 | 101 | — |
| 1975 | 94 | −1.02% |
| 1982 | 82 | −1.93% |
| 1990 | 109 | +3.62% |
| 1999 | 120 | +1.07% |
| 2007 | 123 | +0.31% |
| 2012 | 126 | +0.48% |
| 2017 | 117 | −1.47% |
| 2023 | 122 | +0.70% |
Source: INSEE

== See also ==
- Communes of the Ariège department
