= Nalzen =

Commune in Occitanie, France

- Commune
- Location of Nalzen
- Location within France Location within Occitanie
- Coordinates: 42°55′06″N 1°45′32″E
- Country: France
- Region: Occitania
- Department: Ariège
- Arrondissement: Pamiers
- Canton: Pays d'Olmes
- Intercommunality: Pays d'Olmes

Government
  - Mayor (2020–2026): Patrick Ferrie
- Area^{1}: 5.5 km^{2} (2.1 sq mi)
- Elevation: 633 m (2,077 ft)
- Highest elevation: 969 m (3,179 ft)
- Lowest elevation: 520 m (1,710 ft)
- Population (2023): 110
  - Density: 20/km^{2} (52/sq mi)
- Time zone: UTC+01:00 (CET)
  - Summer (DST): UTC+02:00 (CEST)
- INSEE/Postal code: 09215 /09300
- ^{1} French Land Register data, which excludes lakes, ponds, glaciers > 1 km^{2} (0.386 sq mi or 247 acres) and river estuaries.

Nalzen is a commune in the Ariège department in southwestern France.

== Population ==
Historical population
Year	Pop.	±% p.a.
1968	164	—
1975	180	+1.34%
1982	159	−1.76%
1990	148	−0.89%
1999	141	−0.54%
2007	131	−0.92%
2012	127	−0.62%
2017	136	+1.38%
2023	110	−3.47%
Source: INSEE

== See also ==
- Communes of the Ariège department
