= Tourtrol =

Commune in Occitanie, France

- Commune
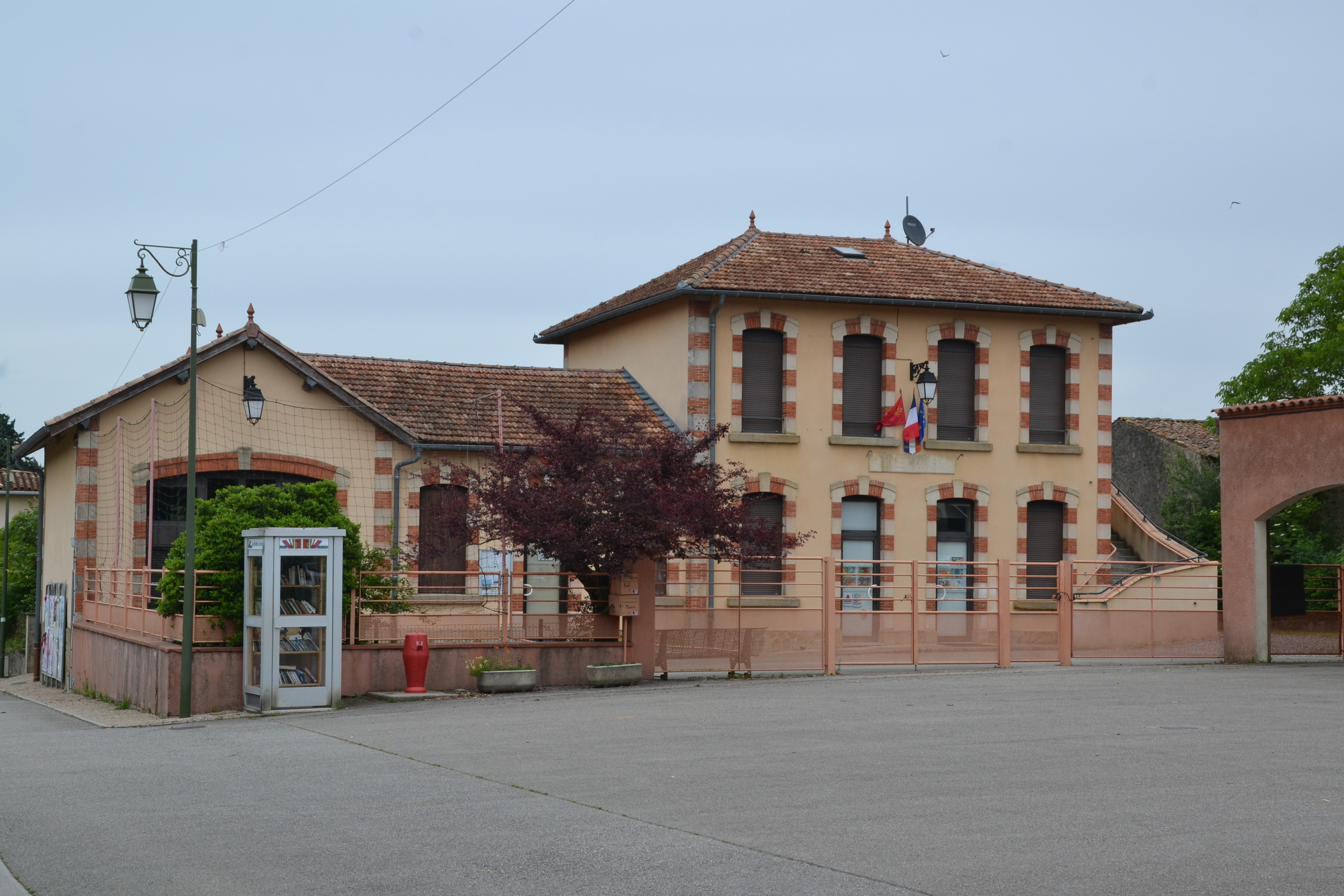
- Tourtrol Town Hall

- Coat of arms
- Location of Tourtrol
- Location within France Location within Occitanie
- Coordinates: 43°04′12″N 1°47′57″E
- Country: France
- Region: Occitania
- Department: Ariège
- Arrondissement: Pamiers
- Canton: Mirepoix
- Intercommunality: Pays de Mirepoix

Government
  - Mayor (2020–2026): Michel Biard
- Area^{1}: 4.97 km^{2} (1.92 sq mi)
- Elevation: 289 m (948 ft)
- Highest elevation: 471 m (1,545 ft)
- Lowest elevation: 269 m (883 ft)
- Population (2023): 238
  - Density: 47.9/km^{2} (124/sq mi)
- Time zone: UTC+01:00 (CET)
  - Summer (DST): UTC+02:00 (CEST)
- INSEE/Postal code: 09314 /09500
- ^{1} French Land Register data, which excludes lakes, ponds, glaciers > 1 km^{2} (0.386 sq mi or 247 acres) and river estuaries.

Tourtrol (French pronunciation: [tuʁtʁɔl]; Occitan: Tortròl) is a commune in the Ariège department located in southwestern France.

== Population ==
Inhabitants of Tourtrol are called Tourtroléens in French.

Historical population
Year	Pop.	±% p.a.
1968	165	—
1975	175	+0.84%
1982	187	+0.95%
1990	194	+0.46%
1999	204	+0.56%
2007	242	+2.16%
2012	236	−0.50%
2017	298	+4.78%
2023	238	−3.68%
Source: INSEE

== See also ==
- Communes of the Ariège department
