= Dreuilhe =

Commune in Occitanie, France

- Commune
- Location of Dreuilhe
- Location within France Location within Occitanie
- Coordinates: 42°56′52″N 1°51′38″E
- Country: France
- Region: Occitania
- Department: Ariège
- Arrondissement: Pamiers
- Canton: Pays d'Olmes
- Intercommunality: Pays d'Olmes

Government
  - Mayor (2020–2026): Jacques Carol
- Area^{1}: 6.93 km^{2} (2.68 sq mi)
- Elevation: 494 m (1,621 ft)
- Highest elevation: 765 m (2,510 ft)
- Lowest elevation: 464 m (1,522 ft)
- Population (2023): 360
  - Density: 52/km^{2} (130/sq mi)
- Time zone: UTC+01:00 (CET)
  - Summer (DST): UTC+02:00 (CEST)
- INSEE/Postal code: 09106 /09300
- ^{1} French Land Register data, which excludes lakes, ponds, glaciers > 1 km^{2} (0.386 sq mi or 247 acres) and river estuaries.

Dreuilhe (French pronunciation: [dʁœj]; Occitan: Drulha) is a commune in the Ariège department in southwestern France.

== Population ==
Historical population
Year	Pop.	±% p.a.
1968	310	—
1975	308	−0.09%
1982	330	+0.99%
1990	389	+2.08%
1999	326	−1.94%
2007	380	+1.93%
2012	362	−0.97%
2017	355	−0.39%
2023	360	+0.23%
Source: INSEE

== See also ==
- Communes of the Ariège department
