= Sainte-Foi =

Commune in Occitanie, France

- Commune
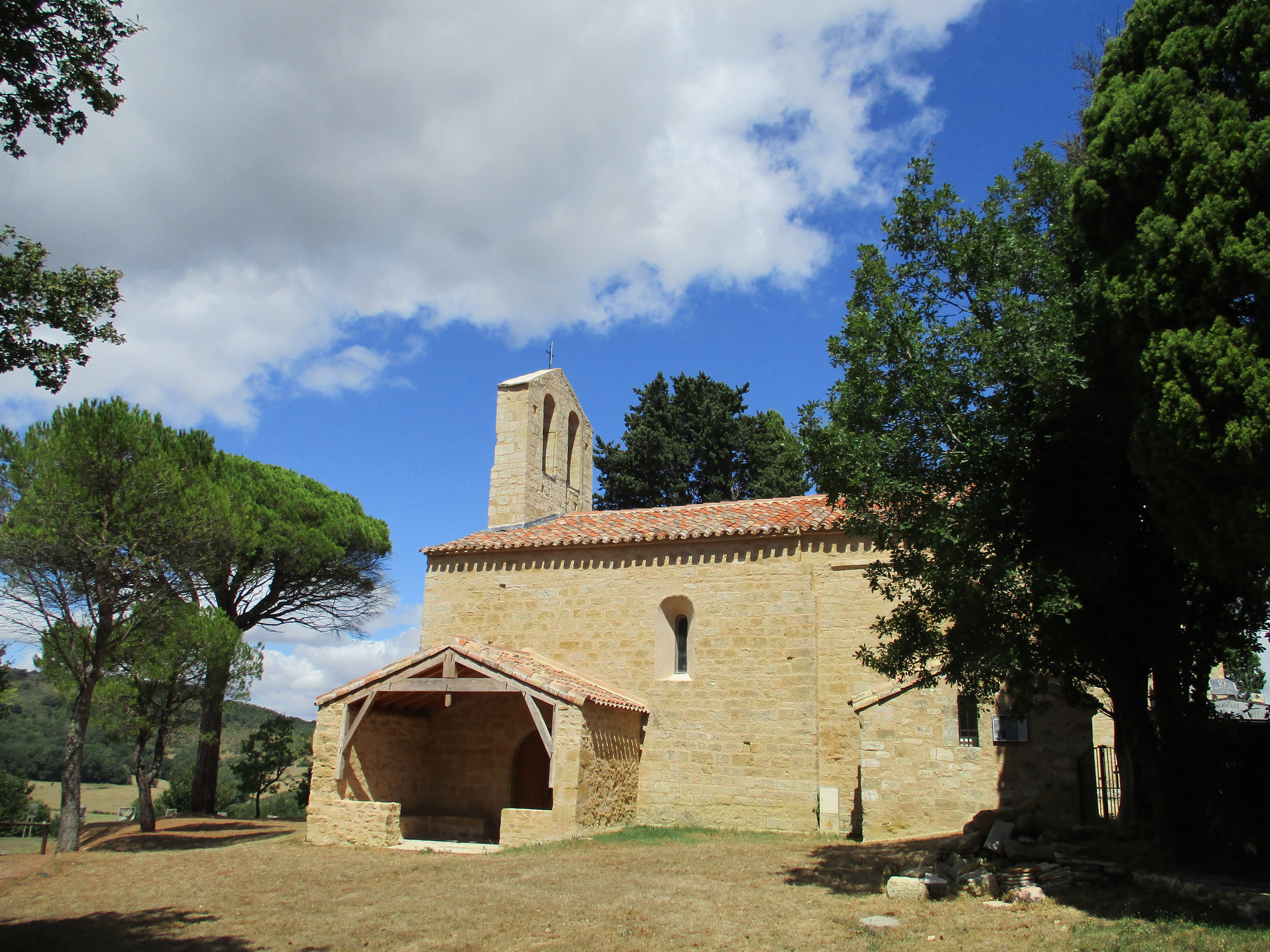
- Chapel Sainte-Foi

- Coat of arms
- Location of Sainte-Foi
- Location within France Location within Occitanie
- Coordinates: 43°07′48″N 1°54′55″E
- Country: France
- Region: Occitania
- Department: Ariège
- Arrondissement: Pamiers
- Canton: Mirepoix
- Intercommunality: Pays de Mirepoix

Government
  - Mayor (2020–2026): Daniel Gaillard
- Area^{1}: 2.41 km^{2} (0.93 sq mi)
- Elevation: 417 m (1,368 ft)
- Highest elevation: 451 m (1,480 ft)
- Lowest elevation: 337 m (1,106 ft)
- Population (2023): 29
  - Density: 12/km^{2} (31/sq mi)
- Time zone: UTC+01:00 (CET)
  - Summer (DST): UTC+02:00 (CEST)
- INSEE/Postal code: 09260 /09500
- ^{1} French Land Register data, which excludes lakes, ponds, glaciers > 1 km^{2} (0.386 sq mi or 247 acres) and river estuaries.

Sainte-Foi (French pronunciation: [sɛ̃t fwa]; Occitan: Santa Fe) is a commune in the Ariège department in southwestern France.

== Population ==
Inhabitants of Sainte-Foi are called Fidésiens in French.

Historical population
Year	Pop.	±% p.a.
1968	15	—
1975	19	+3.43%
1982	19	+0.00%
1990	20	+0.64%
1999	22	+1.06%
2007	28	+3.06%
2012	24	−3.04%
2017	26	+1.61%
2023	29	+1.84%
Source: INSEE

== See also ==
- Communes of the Ariège department
