= Troye-d'Ariège =

Commune in Occitanie, France

- Commune
- Coat of arms
- Location of Troye-d'Ariège
- Location within France Location within Occitanie
- Coordinates: 43°01′41″N 1°52′44″E
- Country: France
- Region: Occitania
- Department: Ariège
- Arrondissement: Pamiers
- Canton: Mirepoix
- Intercommunality: Pays de Mirepoix

Government
  - Mayor (2020–2026): Marcel Esquerrer
- Area^{1}: 8.15 km^{2} (3.15 sq mi)
- Elevation: 420 m (1,380 ft)
- Highest elevation: 549 m (1,801 ft)
- Lowest elevation: 359 m (1,178 ft)
- Population (2023): 110
  - Density: 13/km^{2} (35/sq mi)
- Time zone: UTC+01:00 (CET)
  - Summer (DST): UTC+02:00 (CEST)
- INSEE/Postal code: 09316 /9500
- ^{1} French Land Register data, which excludes lakes, ponds, glaciers > 1 km^{2} (0.386 sq mi or 247 acres) and river estuaries.

Troye-d'Ariège (Occitan: Troia d'Arièja) is a commune in the Ariège department in southwestern France.

== Population ==
Inhabitants of Troye-d'Ariège are called Troyens in French.

Historical population
Year	Pop.	±% p.a.
1968	66	—
1975	53	−3.09%
1982	64	+2.73%
1990	84	+3.46%
1999	93	+1.14%
2007	81	−1.71%
2012	95	+3.24%
2017	86	−1.97%
2023	110	+4.19%
Source: INSEE

== See also ==
- Communes of the Ariège department
