= Freychenet =

Commune in Occitanie, France

- Commune
- Location of Freychenet
- Location within France Location within Occitanie
- Coordinates: 42°54′34″N 1°43′16″E
- Country: France
- Region: Occitania
- Department: Ariège
- Arrondissement: Pamiers
- Canton: Pays d'Olmes

Government
  - Mayor (2020–2026): Michel Moréreau
- Area^{1}: 24.69 km^{2} (9.53 sq mi)
- Elevation: 803 m (2,635 ft)
- Highest elevation: 2,001 m (6,565 ft)
- Lowest elevation: 557 m (1,827 ft)
- Population (2023): 82
  - Density: 3.3/km^{2} (8.6/sq mi)
- Time zone: UTC+01:00 (CET)
  - Summer (DST): UTC+02:00 (CEST)
- INSEE/Postal code: 09126 /09300
- ^{1} French Land Register data, which excludes lakes, ponds, glaciers > 1 km^{2} (0.386 sq mi or 247 acres) and river estuaries.

Freychenet is a commune in the Ariège department in southwestern France.

== Population ==
Historical population
Year	Pop.	±% p.a.
1968	94	—
1975	83	−1.76%
1982	76	−1.25%
1990	66	−1.75%
1999	83	+2.58%
2007	99	+2.23%
2012	98	−0.20%
2017	90	−1.69%
2023	82	−1.54%
Source: INSEE

== See also ==
- Communes of the Ariège department
