= Saint-Quentin-la-Tour =

Commune in Occitanie, France

- Commune
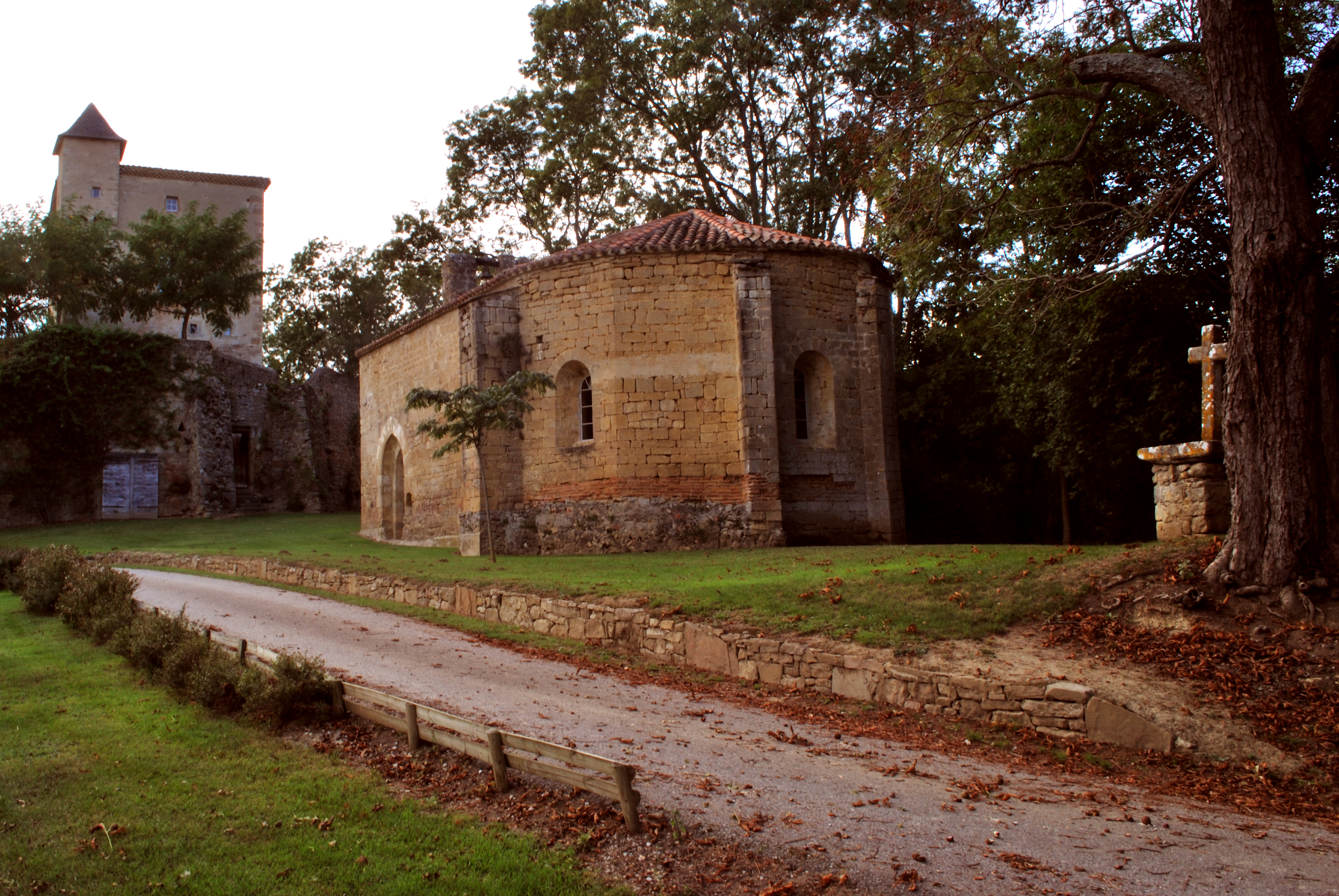
- The church in Saint-Quentin-la-Tour

- Coat of arms
- Location of Saint-Quentin-la-Tour
- Location within France Location within Occitanie
- Coordinates: 43°02′03″N 1°53′59″E
- Country: France
- Region: Occitania
- Department: Ariège
- Arrondissement: Pamiers
- Canton: Mirepoix
- Intercommunality: Pays de Mirepoix

Government
  - Mayor (2020–2026): Alain Tomeo
- Area^{1}: 9.02 km^{2} (3.48 sq mi)
- Elevation: 359 m (1,178 ft)
- Highest elevation: 463 m (1,519 ft)
- Lowest elevation: 334 m (1,096 ft)
- Population (2023): 311
  - Density: 34.5/km^{2} (89.3/sq mi)
- Time zone: UTC+01:00 (CET)
  - Summer (DST): UTC+02:00 (CEST)
- INSEE/Postal code: 09274 /09500
- ^{1} French Land Register data, which excludes lakes, ponds, glaciers > 1 km^{2} (0.386 sq mi or 247 acres) and river estuaries.

Saint-Quentin-la-Tour (French pronunciation: [sɛ̃ kɑ̃tɛ̃ la tuʁ]; Languedocien: Sant Quentin) is a commune in the Ariège department in southwestern France.

== Population ==
Inhabitants of Saint-Quentin-la-Tour are called Saint-Quentinois in French.

Historical population
Year	Pop.	±% p.a.
1968	255	—
1975	250	−0.28%
1982	278	+1.53%
1990	306	+1.21%
1999	297	−0.33%
2007	316	+0.78%
2012	325	+0.56%
2017	337	+0.73%
2023	311	−1.33%
Source: INSEE

== See also ==
- Communes of the Ariège department
