= Malegoude =

Commune in Occitanie, France

- Commune
- Coat of arms
- Location of Malegoude
- Location within France Location within Occitanie
- Coordinates: 43°06′48″N 1°56′22″E
- Country: France
- Region: Occitania
- Department: Ariège
- Arrondissement: Pamiers
- Canton: Mirepoix
- Intercommunality: Pays de Mirepoix

Government
  - Mayor (2020–2026): Marie Lopez-Nayrac
- Area^{1}: 6.14 km^{2} (2.37 sq mi)
- Elevation: 412 m (1,352 ft)
- Highest elevation: 425 m (1,394 ft)
- Lowest elevation: 315 m (1,033 ft)
- Population (2023): 36
  - Density: 5.9/km^{2} (15/sq mi)
- Time zone: UTC+01:00 (CET)
  - Summer (DST): UTC+02:00 (CEST)
- INSEE/Postal code: 09178 /09500
- ^{1} French Land Register data, which excludes lakes, ponds, glaciers > 1 km^{2} (0.386 sq mi or 247 acres) and river estuaries.

Malegoude (French pronunciation: [malɡud]; Occitan: Malagoda) is a commune in the Ariège department in southwestern France.

== Population ==
Historical population
Year	Pop.	±% p.a.
1968	49	—
1975	52	+0.85%
1982	49	−0.85%
1990	66	+3.79%
1999	66	+0.00%
2007	62	−0.78%
2012	41	−7.94%
2017	46	+2.33%
2023	36	−4.00%
Source: INSEE

== See also ==
- Communes of the Ariège department
