= Cazals-des-Baylès =

Commune in Occitanie, France

- Commune
- Coat of arms
- Location of Cazals-des-Baylès
- Location within France Location within Occitanie
- Coordinates: 43°05′18″N 1°56′53″E
- Country: France
- Region: Occitania
- Department: Ariège
- Arrondissement: Pamiers
- Canton: Mirepoix

Government
  - Mayor (2020–2026): Luc Trindade
- Area^{1}: 4.71 km^{2} (1.82 sq mi)
- Elevation: 300 m (980 ft)
- Highest elevation: 421 m (1,381 ft)
- Lowest elevation: 305 m (1,001 ft)
- Population (2023): 57
  - Density: 12/km^{2} (31/sq mi)
- Time zone: UTC+01:00 (CET)
  - Summer (DST): UTC+02:00 (CEST)
- INSEE/Postal code: 09089 /09500
- ^{1} French Land Register data, which excludes lakes, ponds, glaciers > 1 km^{2} (0.386 sq mi or 247 acres) and river estuaries.

Cazals-des-Baylès is a commune in the Ariège department in southwestern France.

== Population ==
Historical population
Year	Pop.	±% p.a.
1968	50	—
1975	55	+1.37%
1982	37	−5.51%
1990	31	−2.19%
1999	36	+1.68%
2007	39	+1.01%
2012	49	+4.67%
2017	56	+2.71%
2023	57	+0.30%
Source: INSEE

== See also ==
- Communes of the Ariège department
