= Canton of Mirepoix =

Coordinates: 43.09°N 1.87°E

- Canton
- Location of the Canton of Mirepoix in the Ariège department.
- Country: France
- Region: Occitania
- Department: Ariège
- No. of communes: {{{nbcomm}}}
- Established: before 1833

Government
  - Representatives (2021–2028): Nicole Quillien; Alain Tomeo
- Area: 350.94 km^{2} (135.50 sq mi)
- Population (2023): 13,443
  - Density: 38.306/km^{2} (99.211/sq mi)
- INSEE code: 09 06

The canton of Mirepoix (French: Canton de Mirepoix) is an administrative division of the Ariège department, southern France. Its borders were not modified at the French canton reorganisation which came into effect in March 2015. Its seat is in Mirepoix.

== Composition ==
As of 2015, the canton consists of the 35 following communes:

List of the 35 communes of the Canton of Mirepoix on 1 January 2020
Name	Code INSEE	Intercommunality	Area (km^{2})	Population (2017)	Density (per km^{2})
Mirepoix (Seat)	09194	CC du Pays de Mirepoix	47.28	3,158	67
Aigues-Vives	09002	CC du Pays de Mirepoix	5.16	666	129
Belloc	09048	CC du Pays de Mirepoix	9.54	76	8.0
Besset	09052	CC du Pays de Mirepoix	8.13	164	20
Camon	09074	CC du Pays de Mirepoix	10.25	143	14
Cazals-des-Baylès	09089	CC du Pays de Mirepoix	4.71	56	12
Coutens	09102	CC du Pays de Mirepoix	4.19	172	41
Dun	09107	CC du Pays de Mirepoix	41.41	586	14
Esclagne	09115	CC du Pays de Mirepoix	3.52	146	41
La Bastide-de-Bousignac	09039	CC du Pays de Mirepoix	12.53	338	27
La Bastide-sur-l'Hers	09043	CC du Pays de Mirepoix	4.77	678	142
Lagarde	09150	CC du Pays de Mirepoix	11.93	194	16
Lapenne	09153	CC du Pays de Mirepoix	21.57	127	5.9
Laroque-d'Olmes	09157	CC du Pays d'Olmes	14.36	2,433	169
Le Peyrat	09229	CC du Pays de Mirepoix	6.13	473	77
Léran	09161	CC du Pays de Mirepoix	11.92	591	50
Limbrassac	09169	CC du Pays de Mirepoix	12.42	133	11
Malegoude	09178	CC du Pays de Mirepoix	6.14	46	7.5
Manses	09180	CC du Pays de Mirepoix	15.36	126	8.2
Montbel	09200	CC du Pays de Mirepoix	17.36	110	6.3
Moulin-Neuf	09213	CC du Pays de Mirepoix	2.62	238	91
Pradettes	09233	CC du Pays de Mirepoix	3.52	50	14
Régat	09243	CC du Pays de Mirepoix	2.16	85	39
Rieucros	09244	CC du Pays de Mirepoix	5.57	702	126
Roumengoux	09251	CC du Pays de Mirepoix	6.87	166	24
Saint-Félix-de-Tournegat	09259	CC du Pays de Mirepoix	10.51	142	14
Saint-Julien-de-Gras-Capou	09266	CC du Pays de Mirepoix	6.14	54	8.8
Saint-Quentin-la-Tour	09274	CC du Pays de Mirepoix	9.02	337	37
Sainte-Foi	09260	CC du Pays de Mirepoix	2.41	26	11
Tabre	09305	CC du Pays d'Olmes	2.83	368	130
Teilhet	09309	CC du Pays de Mirepoix	8.96	154	17
Tourtrol	09314	CC du Pays de Mirepoix	4.97	298	60
Troye-d'Ariège	09316	CC du Pays de Mirepoix	8.15	86	11
Vals	09323	CC du Pays de Mirepoix	4.13	98	24
Viviès	09341	CC du Pays de Mirepoix	4.40	124	28
Canton de Mirepoix	09 06		350.94	13,344	38
