= Teilhet, Ariège =

Commune in Occitanie, France

Teilhet
- Commune
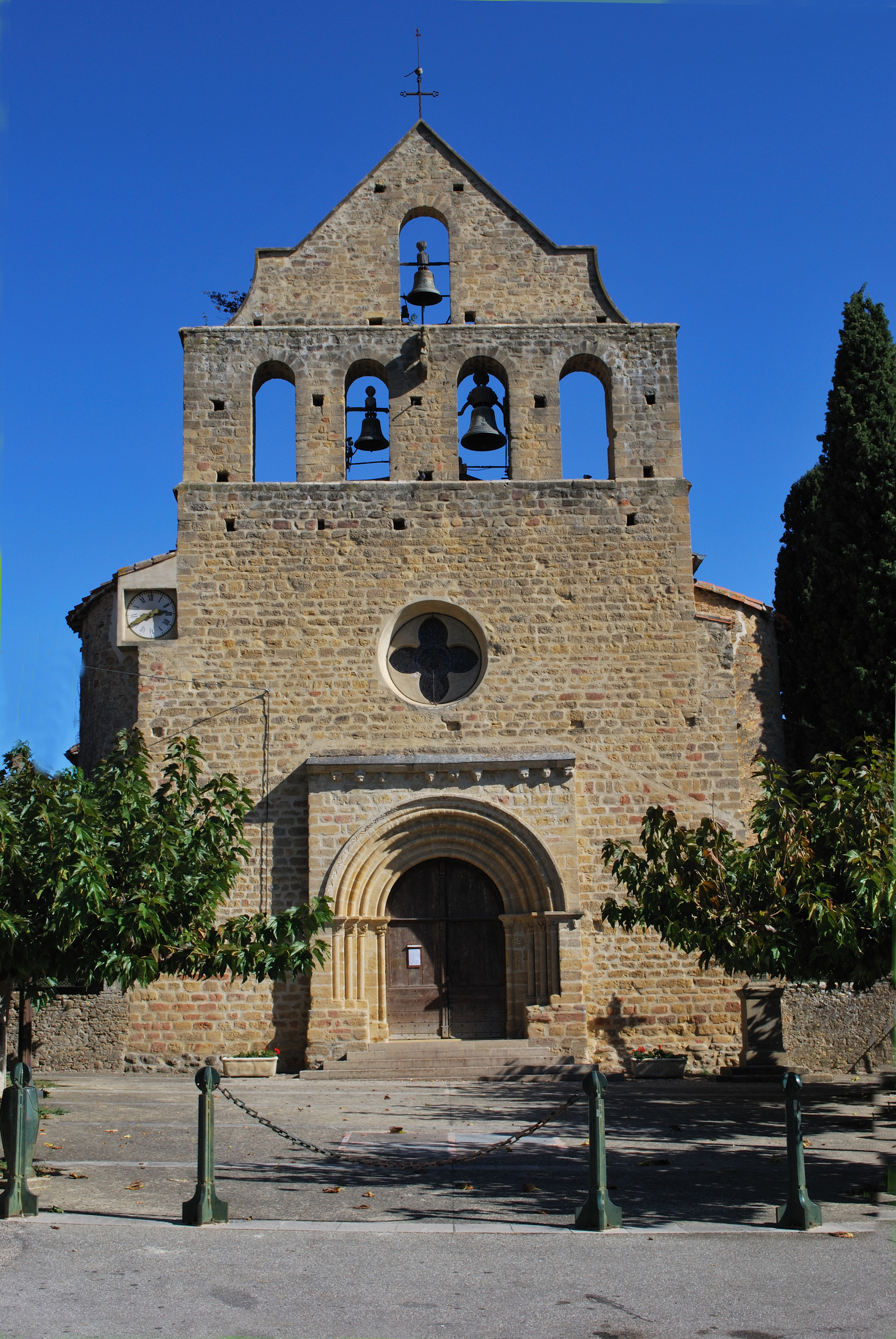
- The church in Teilhet

- Coat of arms
- Location of Teilhet
- Location within France Location within Occitanie
- Coordinates: 43°05′36″N 1°46′48″E
- Country: France
- Region: Occitania
- Department: Ariège
- Arrondissement: Pamiers
- Canton: Mirepoix

Government
  - Mayor (2020–2026): Francis Chauvry
- Area^{1}: 8.96 km^{2} (3.46 sq mi)
- Elevation: 290 m (950 ft)
- Highest elevation: 424 m (1,391 ft)
- Lowest elevation: 262 m (860 ft)
- Population (2023): 162
  - Density: 18.1/km^{2} (46.8/sq mi)
- Time zone: UTC+01:00 (CET)
  - Summer (DST): UTC+02:00 (CEST)
- INSEE/Postal code: 09309 /09500
- ^{1} French Land Register data, which excludes lakes, ponds, glaciers > 1 km^{2} (0.386 sq mi or 247 acres) and river estuaries.

Teilhet (French pronunciation: [tɛjɛ]; Occitan: Telhet) is a commune in the Ariège department in southwestern France.

== Population ==
Inhabitants of Teilhet are called Teilhetois in French.

Historical population
Year	Pop.	±% p.a.
1968	135	—
1975	93	−5.18%
1982	112	+2.69%
1990	125	+1.38%
1999	152	+2.20%
2007	182	+2.28%
2012	161	−2.42%
2017	154	−0.89%
2023	162	+0.85%
Source: INSEE

== See also ==
- Communes of the Ariège department
