= Teilhet (surname) =

Teilhet is a surname. Notable people with the surname include:

- Darwin Teilhet (1904–1964), American mystery novelist, advertising executive, journalist, and film screenwriter
- Rob Teilhet (fl. 1996–2011), American politician
