= Régat =

Commune in Occitanie, France

- Commune
- Coat of arms
- Location of Régat
- Location within France Location within Occitanie
- Coordinates: 42°59′23″N 1°53′11″E
- Country: France
- Region: Occitania
- Department: Ariège
- Arrondissement: Pamiers
- Canton: Mirepoix
- Intercommunality: Pays de Mirepoix

Government
  - Mayor (2020–2026): Michel Morell
- Area^{1}: 2.16 km^{2} (0.83 sq mi)
- Elevation: 318 m (1,043 ft)
- Highest elevation: 524 m (1,719 ft)
- Lowest elevation: 403 m (1,322 ft)
- Population (2023): 99
  - Density: 46/km^{2} (120/sq mi)
- Time zone: UTC+01:00 (CET)
  - Summer (DST): UTC+02:00 (CEST)
- INSEE/Postal code: 09243 /09600
- ^{1} French Land Register data, which excludes lakes, ponds, glaciers > 1 km^{2} (0.386 sq mi or 247 acres) and river estuaries.

Régat is a commune in the Ariège department in southwestern France.

== Population ==
Inhabitants are called Régatois in French.

Historical population
Year	Pop.	±% p.a.
1968	29	—
1975	29	+0.00%
1982	50	+8.09%
1990	56	+1.43%
1999	62	+1.14%
2007	78	+2.91%
2012	91	+3.13%
2017	85	−1.35%
2023	99	+2.57%
Source: INSEE

== See also ==
- Communes of the Ariège department
