= La Bastide-de-Sérou =

Commune in Occitanie, France

- Commune
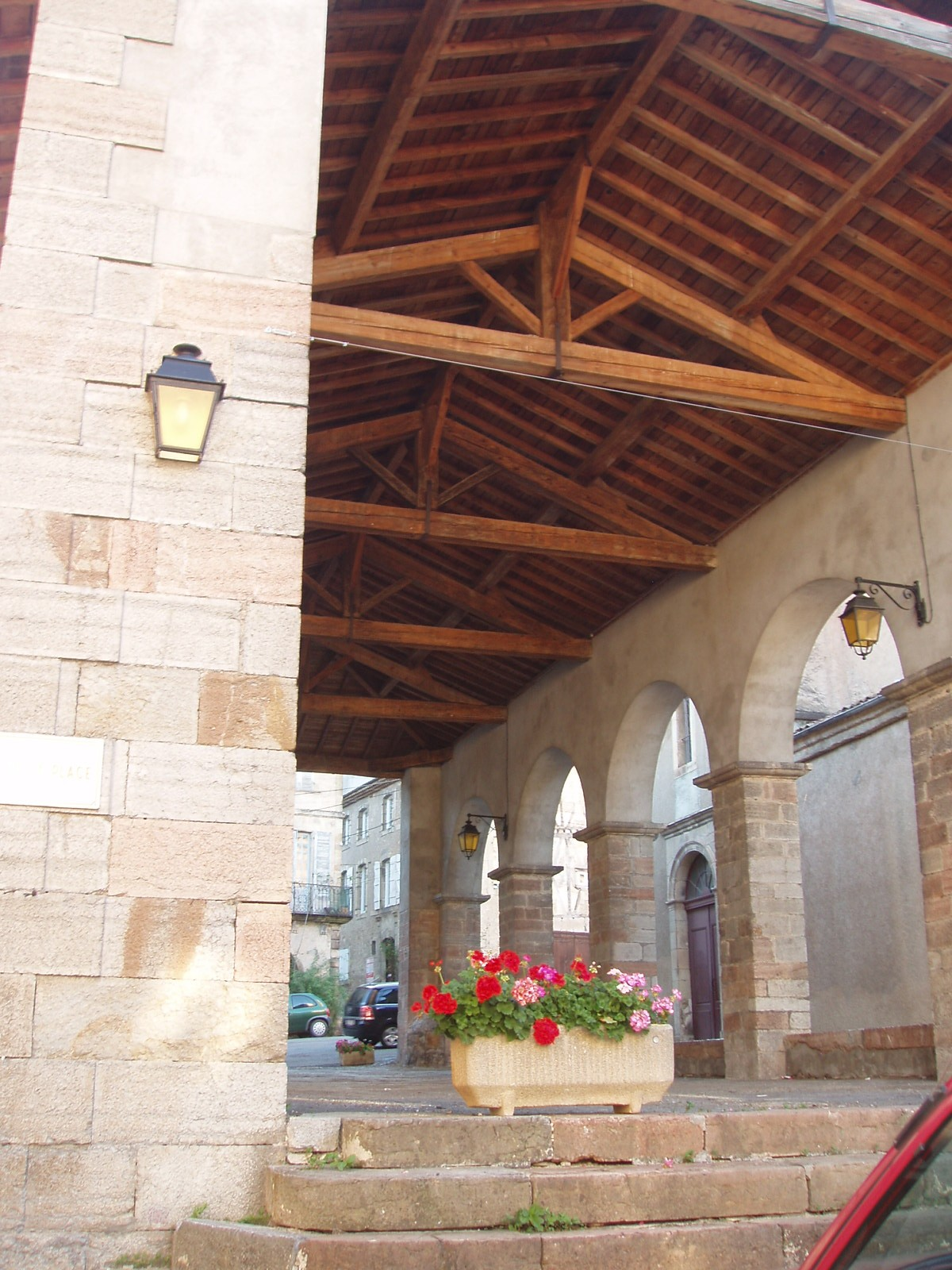
- The covered market

- Coat of arms
- Location of La Bastide-de-Sérou
- Location within France Location within Occitanie
- Coordinates: 43°00′46″N 1°25′43″E
- Country: France
- Region: Occitania
- Department: Ariège
- Arrondissement: Saint-Girons
- Canton: Couserans Est
- Intercommunality: Couserans-Pyrénées

Government
  - Mayor (2020–2026): Christophe Pillon
- Area^{1}: 43.62 km^{2} (16.84 sq mi)
- Elevation: 406 m (1,332 ft)
- Highest elevation: 692 m (2,270 ft)
- Lowest elevation: 354 m (1,161 ft)
- Population (2023): 965
  - Density: 22.1/km^{2} (57.3/sq mi)
- Time zone: UTC+01:00 (CET)
  - Summer (DST): UTC+02:00 (CEST)
- INSEE/Postal code: 09042 /09240
- ^{1} French Land Register data, which excludes lakes, ponds, glaciers > 1 km^{2} (0.386 sq mi or 247 acres) and river estuaries.

La Bastide-de-Sérou (French pronunciation: [la bastid də seʁu]; Occitan: La Bastida de Seron) is a commune in the Ariège department in the Occitanie region of south-western France.

== Geography ==
La Bastide-de-Sérou is a commune in the Pre-Pyrenees some 15 km south-west of Pamiers and 15 km west by north-west of Foix. It has the odd characteristic of another small commune, Suzan, fully enclosed in the commune. Access to the commune is by the D117 road from Montels in the east which passes through the south of the commune and the village continuing west to Castelnau-Durban. The D49 branches off the D117 in the commune and goes north-west to Allières. The D211 also branches off the D117 in the commune and goes north-east in a circular route back to the D117 via Cadarcet. The D501 goes north from the village to Suzan then continues north to join the D1A east of Gabre. The D42 branches off the D117 in the commune and goes south to Larbont. The D15 goes south-east from the village to Nescus. Apart from the village there are the hamlets of Aron and Brouzenac. The commune is mainly farmland but has forested foothills of the Pyrenees in the north.

The Arize river flows through the south of the commune and the village from east to west to eventually join the Garonne at Carbonne. The Lèze, tributary of the Ariège, has its source in the north-eastern part of the commune and flows north-westwards forming part of the commune's northern border with the lac de Mondely (Mondely lake). Several tributaries rise in the commune and flow into the Lèze including the: Goute des Labadous, Goute du Saou, and Le Gouteret on the left bank and the: Goute du Ribe and Goute des Mouliniers on the right bank. The Ruisseau de Pézegues, Ruisseau de Chichorie, and the Ruisseau de Fourmintas all flow from the south, the first two joining into the Ruisseau de Vic and all join the Arize on the left bank.

== History ==
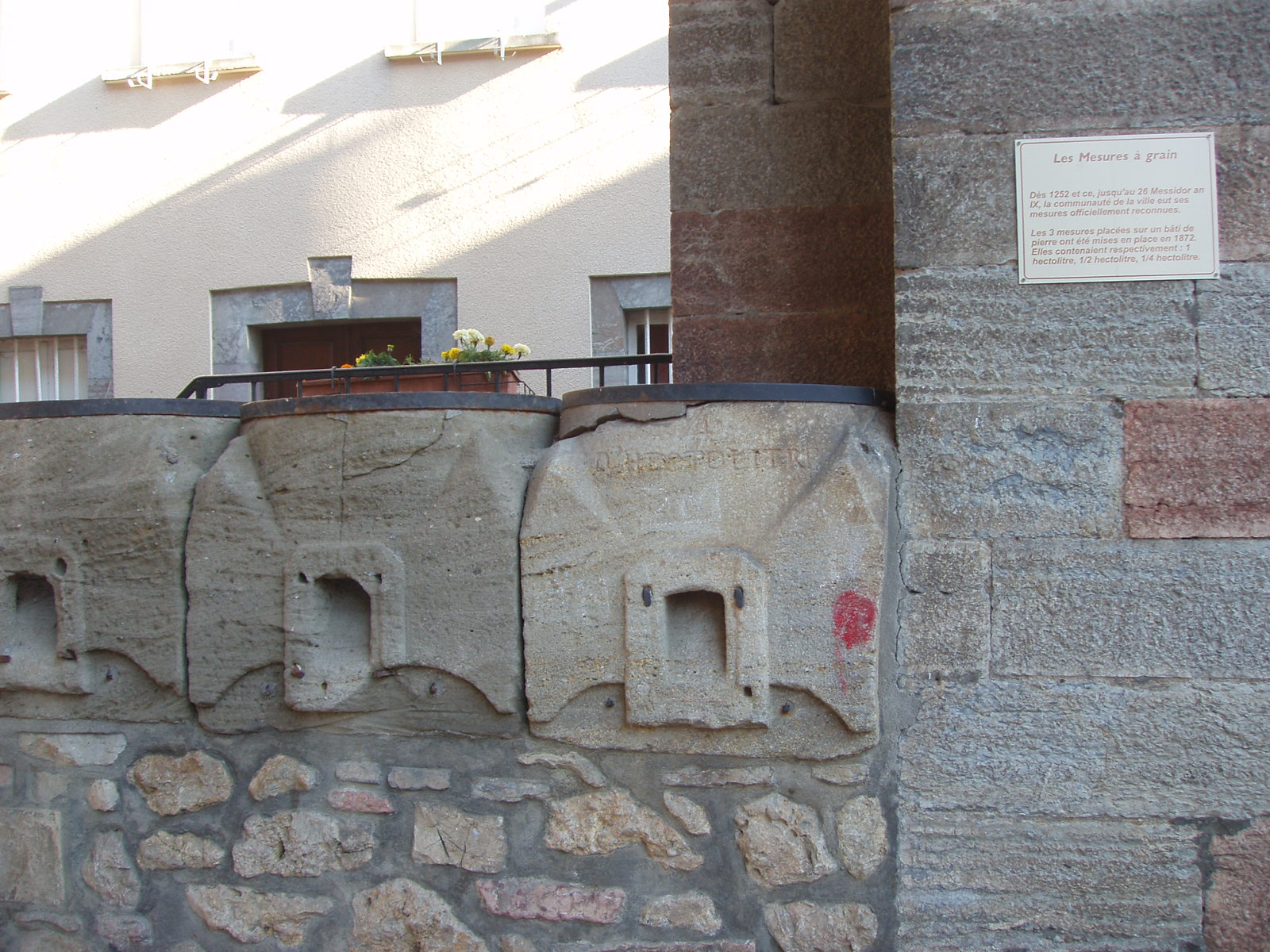
The old Grain measures in the covered market

The Pays des Serones was originally populated with Gallic tribes.

In the Middle Ages, La Bastide-de-Sérou was the capital of one of the sixteen castellanies of the County of Foix. Remains are still visible (Some Amphora at Nescus, the dry lake of Alzen, the Atiels mine, a Gallo-Roman path towards Castelnau-Durban).

In 1150 La Bastide-de-Serou was called Montesquieu (Mount Farouche) and was then composed of the districts of Noir and Faurie.

In 1246 Montesquieu became La Bastide d'Antuzan.

In 1252 the commune came under the charter of Roger IV, Count of Foix, that challenged the monopoly of the mills and forges. Instead the place returned to its old name and Roger IV surrounded it with a circle of walls with four doors: the Porte du Mas, Porte de Foix, Porte d'Arize, and Porte de la Faurie.

It was in the 14th century that the town took its current name. The castle, mentioned in 1255, was razed on the order of Louis XIII. It housed a garrison of the Count of Foix and a prison. Its imposing walls were encircled by a walkway. The city was still walled in 1672.

Gaston I, Count of Foix, who had married Ferdinande of Negroponte, was called to the court of Philip the Fair. This encouraged a love affair between Gaston I and his niece, Jeanne d'Artois, at the expense of Ferdinande Negroponte. Gaston I sent an envoy to the pope to request a repudiation authorization against Ferdinande. This was refused. Philip the Fair overruled the refusal and forced his chaplain to sanctify the new marriage. Ferdinande took refuge in the castle of La Bastide-de-Serou. Their relationship lasted nevertheless and Ferdinande became pregnant. She settled in "the tower" at La Bastide-de-Serou where she gave birth to a boy, Lou. ("The Tour de Lou" has now become "La tour du Loup" meaning "The Wolf Tower"). Gaston I built the Abbey of Salenques at Les Bordes-sur-Arize for Ferdinande.

The title of mayor appeared for the first time in 1745. Like many towns in the region, women and men were equal in making decisions.

The events of 1789 became known later and led to the confiscation of arms of the nobility, priests hiding in fear, and the closure of the church where six of the bells were melted down.

The tree of Liberty was erected at the top of the square and was replanted in 1848. It gave birth to a song: Aquet arbré, aro l'aben arrapat …

In 1823, the Parade ground was planted with Elm trees (which were replaced by plane trees in 1836). Also in 1823, the municipality bought a building in the Church Square for a hospice.

The current covered market dates to 1829-1830 and replaced an old one whose roof had rested on 21 stone pillars. The grain measures date to 1872.

Around 1843 the streets were lit by twelve street lights. A terrible epidemic of cholera struck the town in 1854 and resulted in many deaths. The majority were buried in the new chapel.

Inside the walls, people always possessed houses where animals also lived. La Bastide-de-Sérou has long lacked water inside its walls. After 1858 water was stored in the Tower of Loli to feed water fountains.

The savings bank was founded in 1862 then, in 1864, the telegraph office was built. Around 1870 there were four fairs a year, each lasting two days. The town hall was at the corner of Rue de Foix and Rue de la Rose. The Franciscan convent, which dates from 1222, housed a farm since 1882.

La Bastide-de-Sérou appears as La Bastide de Seron on the 1750 Cassini Map and as LA BASTIDE on the 1790 version.

=== Heraldry ===
Arms of La Bastide-de-Sérou	The official status of the blazon remains to be determined. Blazon: Azure, a Tower Or on a terrace in base Vert.

== Administration ==
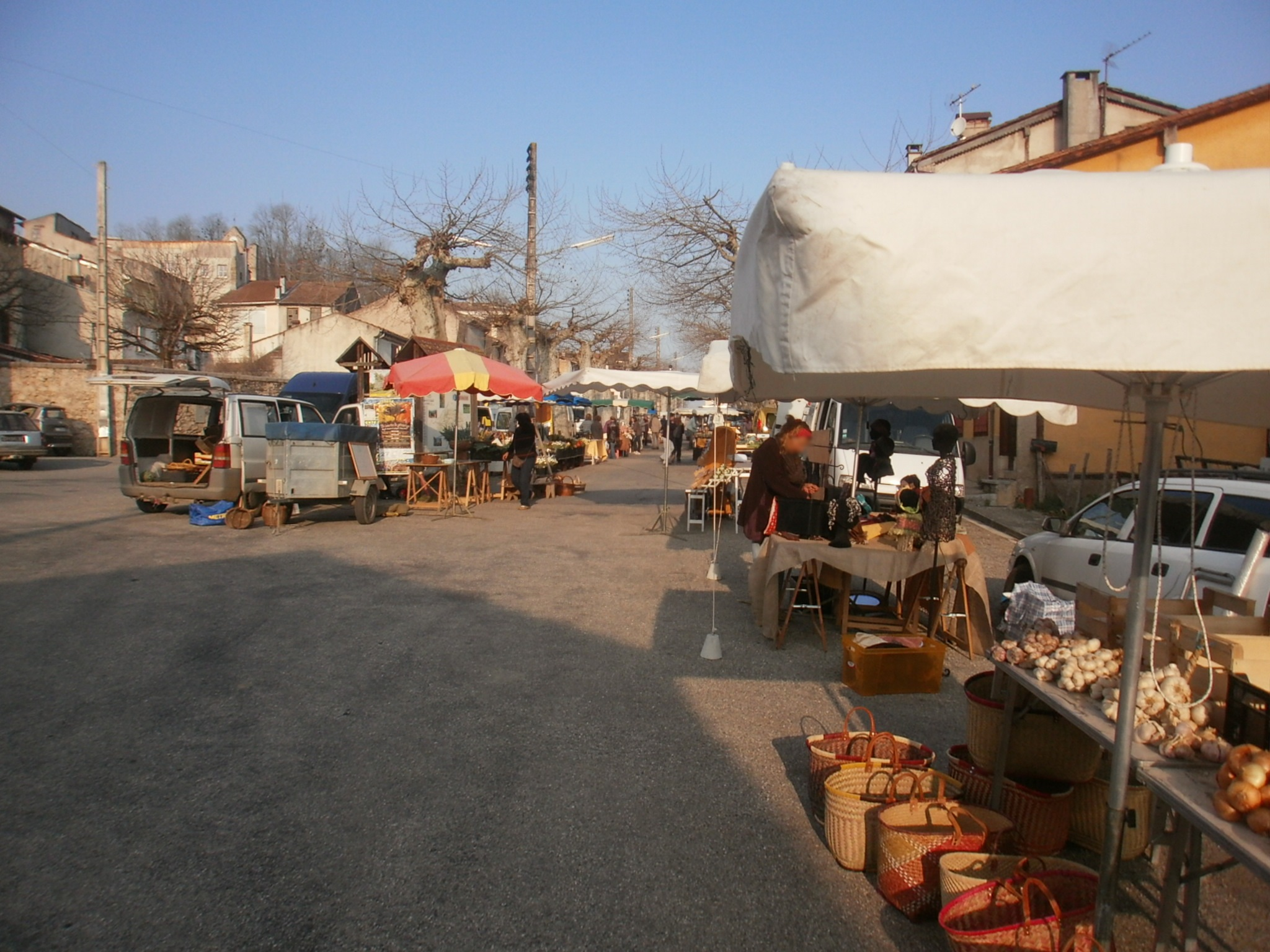
The Thursday market

List of Successive Mayors

Mayors from the French Revolution to 1935

From	To	Name
1790	1791	Jean Hyacinthe de Bertrand
1791	1792	Jean Corneil
1793	1795	Pierre Delenny Saint Martin
1795	1796	Pierre Delaing
1796	1800	Jean Lamayran
1800	1804	Pierre Borrelly
1804	1808	Jean Baptiste Saint Martin
1808	1816	Jean Barthélémy Durrieu
1816	1830	Jean Baptiste Saint Martin
1830	1830	Jean Marie Ferdinand de Morteaux
1830	1836	Léon Lagarde
1836	1837	François Joseph Pujol
1837	1838	François Orsalin Rumeau
1838	1846	Barthélémy Augustin Durrieu
1846	1848	Paul Gauzence
1848	1852	Léon Lagarde
1852	1858	Auguste Durrieu
1858	1865	Paul Troy
1865	1870	Ferdinand de Morteaux
1870	1871	Antoine Bellondrade
1871	1875	Ferdinand de Morteaux
1875	1878	Edouard de Morteaux
1878	1884	Cyprien de Bellison
1884	1884	Henri Lazerges
1884	1892	Edouard de Morteaux
1892	1905	Jean Pierre Devèze
1905	1915	Louis Charles
1915	1919	Célestin Berné
1919	1929	Louis Charles
1929	1931	Paul Gardel
1931	1935	Charles Marcaillou

Mayors from 1935

From	To	Name
1935	1944	Marius Cougoureux
1944	1944	Abel Seguela
1944	1947	Marius Cougoureux
1947	1959	Abel Seguela
1959	1971	Louis Dejean
1971	1983	Jean Nayrou
1983	1989	Fernand Eychenne
1989	2001	Henri Nayrou
2001	2020	Alain Metge
2020	2026	Christophe Pillon

=== Education ===
The commune has a primary school.

== Demography ==
The inhabitants of the commune are known as Bastidiens or Bastidiennes in French.

Historical population

Year	Pop.	±% p.a.
1793	2,132	—
1800	1,830	−2.16%
1806	2,600	+6.03%
1821	2,669	+0.17%
1831	2,911	+0.87%
1836	2,858	−0.37%
1841	2,865	+0.05%
1846	2,944	+0.55%
1851	2,987	+0.29%
1856	2,710	−1.93%
1861	2,717	+0.05%
1866	2,781	+0.47%
1872	2,889	+0.64%
1876	2,865	−0.21%
1881	2,671	−1.39%
1886	2,591	−0.61%
1891	2,504	−0.68%
1896	2,505	+0.01%
1901	2,539	+0.27%

Year	Pop.	±% p.a.
1906	2,519	−0.16%
1911	2,528	+0.07%
1921	1,704	−3.87%
1926	1,634	−0.84%
1931	1,398	−3.07%
1936	1,334	−0.93%
1946	1,190	−1.14%
1954	1,149	−0.44%
1962	1,028	−1.38%
1968	962	−1.10%
1975	941	−0.31%
1982	962	+0.32%
1990	933	−0.38%
1999	907	−0.31%
2007	961	+0.73%
2012	957	−0.08%
2017	957	+0.00%
2023	965	+0.14%

Source: EHESS and INSEE

== Culture and heritage ==
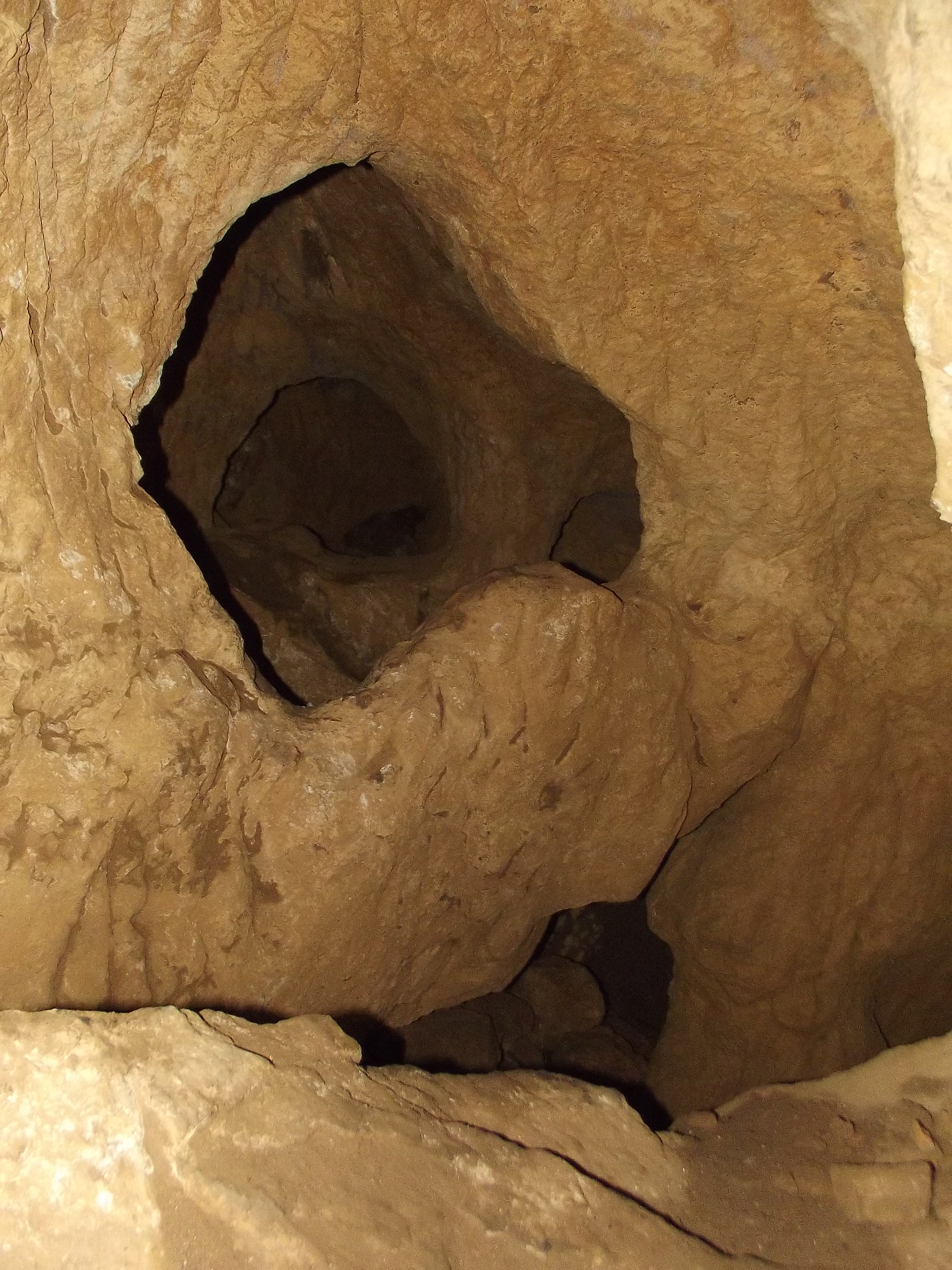
The old Copper mine

=== Civil heritage ===
The commune has a number of buildings and sites that are registered as historical monuments:

- The Tour du Loup (13th century)
- An Old Copper Mine (Gallo-Roman)
- The Chateau of Castelmir Pleasure Garden

=== Religious heritage ===
- The Church of Aron contains two items that are registered as historical objects:
  - A Chalice (18th century)
  - A Bust-Reliquary of Saint Valier (18th century)
- The Church of Vic contains two items that are registered as historical objects:
  - A Chalice (18th century)
  - A Chalice (19th century)
- The Parish Church of Saint John the Baptist contains several items that are registered as historical objects:
  - 6 Candlesticks (18th century)
  - A Bronze Bell (14th century)
  - A Bas-relief: Virgin of Pity (18th century)
  - A Group Sculpture: Virgin of Pity (15th century)
  - 2 Chandeliers (18th century)
  - A Tabernacle (18th century)
  - A Statue: Christ on the Cross (15th century)
  - A Processional Statue: Virgin and child (18th century)

The Church of Unjat is registered as an historical monument. The Church contains a Mural Painting (17th century) which is registered as an historical object.

== See also ==
- Communes of the Ariège department
