= War of the Maidens =

French rebellion

The War of the Maidens (French: Guerre des demoiselles) was a rebellion that took place in the French department of Ariège from 1829 to 1832, and continued in a less intense fashion until 1872. It was the most well-known struggle among those that developed in the Pyrenees in the 19th century.

A demoiselle is a young woman. The name guerre des demoiselles comes from the fact that the countrymen disguised themselves as women, with long white shirts or sheep skins, scarves or wigs, and blacked or concealed faces. This disguise was for attacking—mostly at night—large property owners, forest guards and gendarmes, ironmasters, and charcoal burners.

== Cause ==
The rebellion was due to the passing, on 27 May 1827, of a new forestry code, which was applied from 1829 onwards. This new code imposed "new regulations of forest usage, in particular concerning gathering of wood, wood cutting, and above all pasturing (forbidden from now on), the rights of marronage, hunting, fishing, and gathering." These regulations prohibited what the local people saw as their traditional right to use the forest for pasturing their animals and gathering food. This led to a campaign of civil disobedience in which men dressed as women to hide their identities and which came to be known as the War of the Maidens (la guerre des demoiselles).

== Unfolding ==
=== Castillonnais and the Massat valley (1829–1830) ===
Between spring 1829 and spring 1830, the revolts were very numerous (between 300 and 400 individuals, according to the procès-verbal) and the Maidens came out very frequently. The troubles were concentrated in 2 regions: first the Castillonnais to the south-west of Saint-Girons, until December 1829; and afterwards the valley of Massat, in January 1830. From spring 1830, the revolt extended to the entirety of the department. During this period, the Maidens did not make any claims of a social character. They took issue with everyone who prevented their free use of the forest—guards, gendarmes, and charcoal burners. Resistance to livestock seizures (in guarded areas of the forest) was the first large scale activity of the Maidens.

Despite the efforts of Castillonnais municipal councils to defend the peasants' rights through the legal process, on May 22, 1829, the Maidens chased forest guards out of their homes with shouting and gunfire. They appeared again during a seizure operation, in the forest of Saint-Lary, between May 25–30, 1829. Twenty forest guards, having surprised six trespassing shepherds with their flocks, wanted to seize the livestock; but they quickly found themselves facing a crowd of a hundred disguised and armed countrymen who insulted them, threw stones at them, and even shot at them. Terrified and powerless, the guards retreated.

In July 1829, incidents of this type multiplied and gendarme reinforcements—four brigades, two patrolling Castillonnais and Bellongue, two patrolling Saint-Gironnais—did not prevent the insurrection from spreading. The revolts used guerilla tactics consisting of avoiding direct engagement with the enemy in favor of skirmishes with forest guards.

In mid-August 1829, a new attempt to seize livestock in Bellongue, close to the small village of Buzan, caused one of the largest confrontations of the year. On the 16th of this month, an inspector, two surveyors, and many guards and forest agents coming to mark out an area in the Buzan forest, discovered two flocks of sheep trespassing. Their shepherds refused to give their identity and were tied up to be sent to jail. Soon, many inhabitants of neighboring villages and communities, who were present during the altercation, aggressively demonstrated their discontent. Church bells were rung, alerting neighboring inhabitants. A furious army of Maidens, armed with batons, scythes and guns, intervened and freed the prisoners. A few days later, when the gendarmes arrived to arrest the two shepherds, a new and more menacing rebel army forced them back.

During spring 1829, the Maidens also confronted charcoal burners, accused of exploiting trees. In June, charcoal burners were the target of violence in Sentein, in the Biros valley; and afterwards in July in Ustou, in the south of Saint-Gironnais. Charcoal burner lodges were burned, their cabins and their objects destroyed, and they suffered multiple gunshots. In the night of August 29, the Maidens invaded the forest of Augirein, in Bellelongue, used by charcoal burners of the Engomer forge. In November, a sign warned Buzan charcoal burners to leave the forest or face the consequences. The hostility of the Maidens continued until spring 1830, when in the April of that year some 30 charcoal burners were injured and forced to flee in the forest of Saint-Lary.

Forest guards, insulted, abused, and terrorized, were equally the target of Maidens. On December 17, 1829, guards of the Autrech valley, in the Saint-Lary commune, decided to cease their service after being threatened by 15 Maidens armed with axes. On January 21, 1830, a guard from the Lafont de Sentenac family was injured by a blow to the head with an axe, and threats against forest guards increased in intensity. The revolt started to spread from Massat to the massif of Arize. Also, a band of Maidens surrounded the house of Delpla-Roquemaurel and chased their private guards out. From January to May 1830, their actions multiplied. On January 27, the Maidens plundered the Laffon tower, at Boussenac, that served as a shelter for guards. On February 17, they wrecked the home of one of them at Bernède. On March 29, 200 Maidens summoned the mayor of Rivèrenert to deliver the guards to them. At last, in the night of May 10–11, a hundred Maidens shot at the house of a guard at Saleich, 10 km south of Sailes-du-Salat, in Haute-Garonne. The guard shot and killed a 20 year old attacker. These simple and direct actions, brought against all who infringed on their free use of the forest, became popular very quickly, and the movement was not slow to spread to the neighboring regions in the Ariège department.

=== Propagation of the revolt (1830–1832) ===
Encouraged by the success of the first guerilla actions, the revolt propagated in the Arbas valley (in Haute-Garonne), and in Ariège (in the Cabannes canton and the Ax region). From the beginning of January 1830, a good part of the Ariège department was in unrest, and the Maidens carried out many shows of force. On January 24, at Balaguères (Castillonnais), the day of the local festival, they paraded in the streets armed with axes and guns to the sound of an oboe and a drum. Three days later, 400–500 Maidens paraded at Massat while crying "Down with forest guards!" On February 17, their numbers nearly doubled and the mayor barely avoided a confrontation.

These demonstrations show the support that the Maidens had among the population and local authorities, such as mayors. Troops sent to suppress them were ineffective, because the guerilla actions were sporadic and occurred in mountainous, poorly known territory. In 1829 and 1830, the authorities were barely alarmed by this revolt, because the Maidens’ demands did not seem exorbitant. From summer 1830, the Maidens’ actions became more violent and extended to the entirety of Ariège. They were directed mainly at ironmasters.

On September 27, a departmental forest commission was put in place. The troubles ceased. They restarted in November and continued until March 1831. In May 1832, new violence erupted in Ustou.

=== Sporadic troubles (1833–1872) ===
The troubles continued in a sporadic manner in the following years, until 1872.

== Studies ==
Many studies have been done on this subject. The earliest was that of Prosper Barousse, published in 1839. More poet than historian, Barousse described the legends that surrounded the Maidens’ exploits from an early date. Due to their widespread use of horns and their communication by smoke signals, the Ariège rebels were described as truly organized and disciplined forces obeying warlords. Barousse contributed to popularizing the myth of Jean Vidalou, the poor shepherd who became the great general of the Maidens. The Maidens supposedly received their instructions from a mysterious person with whom they met during the night. Barousse, who took serious liberties with history, thus forged an image of a leader who was out of the ordinary. However, he was not the first to exploit the Ariège revolt for literary ends.

The first truly historic study on this subject was that of Michel Dubedat, in 1900. Short and incomplete, little different from the spirit of its predecessor, it nevertheless brought a global perspective of the events.

Around 1930, René Dupont took up the subject again with the goal of doing a rigorously historic study by scrutinizing the departmental archives of Ariège. He succeeded in reconstructing in great detail the chronology of the troubles and in presenting an interpretation for them. His work was abundantly reused in the studies which followed. Also, a doctoral thesis titled "Délits forestiers et troubles politiques dans les Pyrénées centrales de 1827 à 1851" ("Forestry offences and political troubles in the central Pyrenees from 1827 to 1851"), relying on new evidence from the National Archives, was written by Louis Clarenc at the University of Toulouse.

In 1969, François Baby studied one aspect of this revolt: the role of folklore. The result of his study was a memoir published in 1972.

Jean-François Soulet placed the War of the Maidens in a popular protest movement of the Pyrenees world. He cast the revolt in new light by considering it as one of the protests, already ancient, of civil society against the centralizing enterprise of the state. His work showed that the War of the Maidens should be considered as "one link in a long chain of revolts starting well before 1829, continuing well after 1831, and engaging at one moment or another almost all of the Pyrenean valleys."

== Theater and cinema ==
This rebellion inspired, in 1830, the play Le Drame des Demoiselles, which played in the Théâtre des Variétés in Paris.

In 1983, Jacques Nichet directed a 90-minute feature film entitled La Guerre des Demoiselles.

In 1976, Gerard Guillaume and Jeanne Labrune directed a feature film (two episodes) entitled La Guerre des Demoiselles, set in Massat with professional actors and local contributors. It was at once an essay on collective memory and an activist voice against the Haute-Ariège national park bill. The film was only broadcast once, but it was enthusiastically received among locals during private screenings following animated debates. The thesis of Francois Baby was the historic thread establishing a parallel between the revolt of countrymen in the 19th century and the current trend of protest, dominated by occitanistes, with its epicenter in Larzac. The film is available in the archives of the Institut national de l'audiovisuel.
