= Louise Astoud-Trolley =

French sculptor and painter (1817–1883)

- Born: Louise Pauline Marie Astoud; August 1817; Paris, France
- Died: 15 January 1883 (aged 65); Caen, France
- Education: Jean-Jacques Monanteuil
- Known for: Sculpture and painting

Louise Astoud-Trolley (August 1817 – 15 January 1883) was a French sculptor and painter.

== Biography ==
Born in Paris, Louise Pauline Marie Astoud became a student of her mother and of the painter Jean-Jacques Monanteuil. She exhibited in the Paris Salon from 1865 to 1878. She was the secretary of the artist's society founded by Isidore Taylor. She married François Alfred Trolley de Prévaux, a professor in the faculty of law at the University of Caen, and chevalier of the French Légion d'honneur.

== Works ==
=== Sculpture ===
- Auguste Préault, Salon of 1865, bronze medaillon. Collection of the musée d'Orsay, Paris
- Elie Sorin, bas-relief, musée des beaux-arts d'Angers
- La Vierge et l'Enfant entourés de saint Julien et saint Nicolas de Myre, oil on canvas, after the work of Lorenzo di Credi (1494), Allières. église paroissiale Saint-Roch

=== Painting ===
- Jesucrist aparegut a la Magdalena, 1866.
- Retrat de l'emperadriu Eugenia de Montijo (1869) replica from the original by Franz Xaver Winterhalter.
- La Verge amb el Nen i Sant Julià i Sant Nicolau de Mira, painting. Parochial Church of Saint-Roque, Allières·. copied from the original 1994 work by the Florentine painter Lorenzo di Credi.
