= Massat =

Commune in Occitanie, France

- Commune
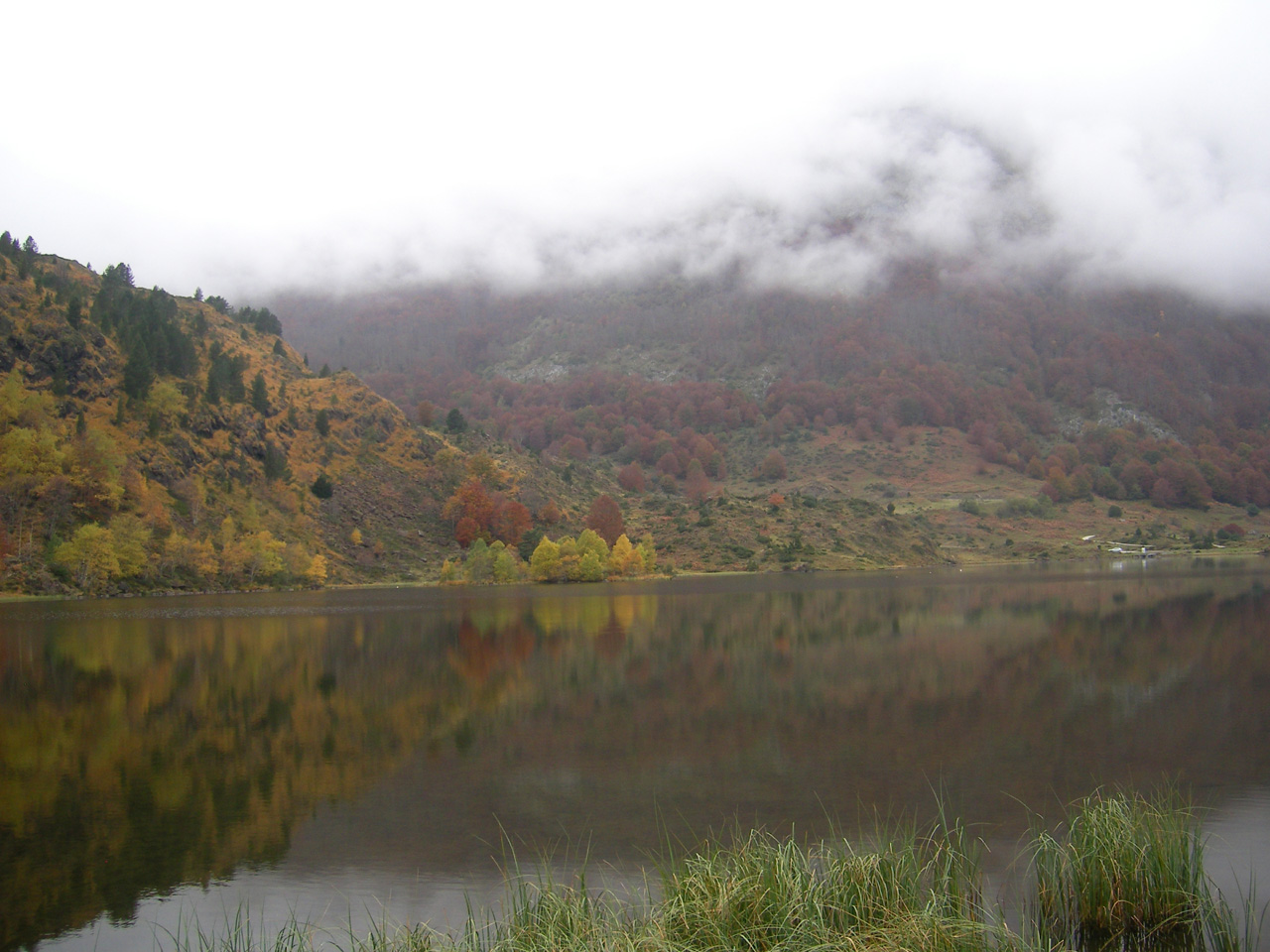
- Étang de Lers

- Coat of arms
- Location of Massat
- Location within France Location within Occitanie
- Coordinates: 42°53′23″N 1°20′55″E
- Country: France
- Region: Occitania
- Department: Ariège
- Arrondissement: Saint-Girons
- Canton: Couserans Est

Government
  - Mayor (2020–2026): Michel Loubet dit Gajol
- Area^{1}: 44.71 km^{2} (17.26 sq mi)
- Elevation: 651 m (2,136 ft)
- Highest elevation: 1,941 m (6,368 ft)
- Lowest elevation: 598 m (1,962 ft)
- Population (2023): 749
  - Density: 16.8/km^{2} (43.4/sq mi)
- Time zone: UTC+01:00 (CET)
  - Summer (DST): UTC+02:00 (CEST)
- INSEE/Postal code: 09182 /09320
- ^{1} French Land Register data, which excludes lakes, ponds, glaciers > 1 km^{2} (0.386 sq mi or 247 acres) and river estuaries.

Massat (French pronunciation: [masat]) is a commune in the Ariège department in southwestern France. It is situated on the former Route nationale 618, the "Route of the Pyrenees".

== History ==
The area dates back to Paleolithic times, when tribes left some traces in painted caves in the Ker valleys of Massat. The village later became a territory used by the Lords of Lomagne to disperse the population to, overcoming a serious problem of overpopulation. Several charters dating from 1146 specify the reciprocal rights of the inhabitants and the lords.

The valley was directed towards an industrial activity lasting almost seven centuries. This included the manufacture of charcoal and cast iron of iron ores in five forging mills operated by Catalan women. From 1820, with the discovery of the means of melting iron with coal, the industrial prosperity of the valley disappeared. Later in the 19th century, agricultural, primarily pastoral farming became the main source for the Massat economy, particularly the production of butter. With a very strong rural migration, amplified by World War I, the commune depopulated quickly, falling dramatically from 9,322 inhabitants in 1831 to 589 in 1999.

== Population ==
In 1851 the communes Biert and Le Port were created from part of the commune of Massat.

Historical population

Year	Pop.	±% p.a.
1793	7,073	—
1806	7,638	+0.59%
1821	8,474	+0.69%
1831	9,322	+0.96%
1836	7,180	−5.09%
1841	9,001	+4.62%
1846	8,863	−0.31%
1851	3,922	−15.05%
1856	3,862	−0.31%
1861	4,031	+0.86%
1866	4,140	+0.54%
1872	4,157	+0.07%
1876	4,084	−0.44%
1881	4,088	+0.02%
1886	3,912	−0.88%
1891	3,704	−1.09%
1896	3,540	−0.90%
1901	3,014	−3.17%

Year	Pop.	±% p.a.
1906	3,267	+1.63%
1911	3,058	−1.31%
1921	2,537	−1.85%
1926	2,544	+0.06%
1931	2,005	−4.65%
1936	1,750	−2.68%
1946	1,414	−2.11%
1954	1,057	−3.57%
1962	849	−2.70%
1968	746	−2.13%
1975	711	−0.68%
1982	598	−2.44%
1990	624	+0.53%
1999	589	−0.64%
2007	722	+2.58%
2012	689	−0.93%
2017	659	−0.89%
2023	749	+2.16%

Source: EHESS and INSEE

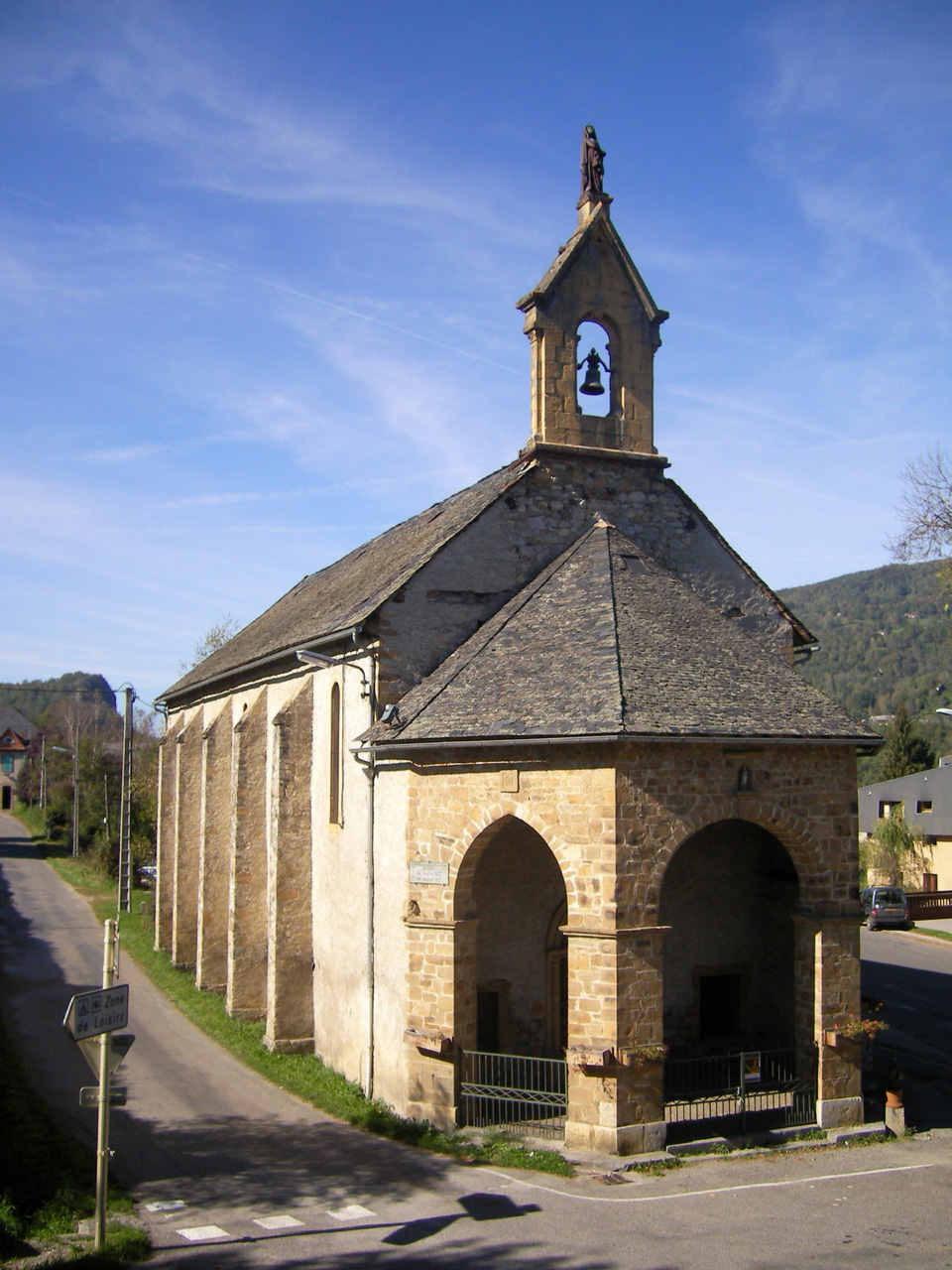
Chapel of Ave Maria

== See also ==
- Communes of the Ariège department
- Col de Port
