= Adolphe d'Assier =

French mathematician, linguist, explorer, and author

- Born: 9 March 1827; La Bastide-de-Sérou, France
- Died: 17 February 1889 (aged 61); Aulus-les-Bains, France
- Occupations: Mathematician, linguist, explorer, writer

Adolphe d'Assier (9 March 1827 – 17 February 1889) was a French mathematician, linguist, explorer, and writer. He is noted for his studies of Brazil and for his works regarding linguistics and spiritism from a positivist framework.

== Biography ==
D'Assier was born in La Bastide-de-Sérou in the Ariège department of southwestern France. He originally worked as a mathematics professor. In 1858, he chose to travel to South America to explore Brazil. He spent two years in the country studying its culture and social structure. These experiences resulted in the publication of his book, Le Brésil contemporain (Contemporary Brazil) in 1867.

He was elected a member of the Academy of Sciences, Fine Arts and Letters of Bordeaux and held a position as the director of the journal Revue d'Aquitaine. He later moved back to his native region of Ariège in 1870. There, he took over the management of the local newspaper La Patrie en danger. D'Assier died at Aulus-les-Bains in 1889 at the age of 61.

== Selected works ==
- Le Brésil contemporain (1867)
- Physiologie du langage graphique (1868)
- Essai sur l'humanité posthume et le spiritisme par un positiviste (1883)
- Essai de philosophie naturelle: le ciel, la terre, l'homme (1886)
