= Alos, Ariège =

Commune in Occitanie, France

Alos
- Commune
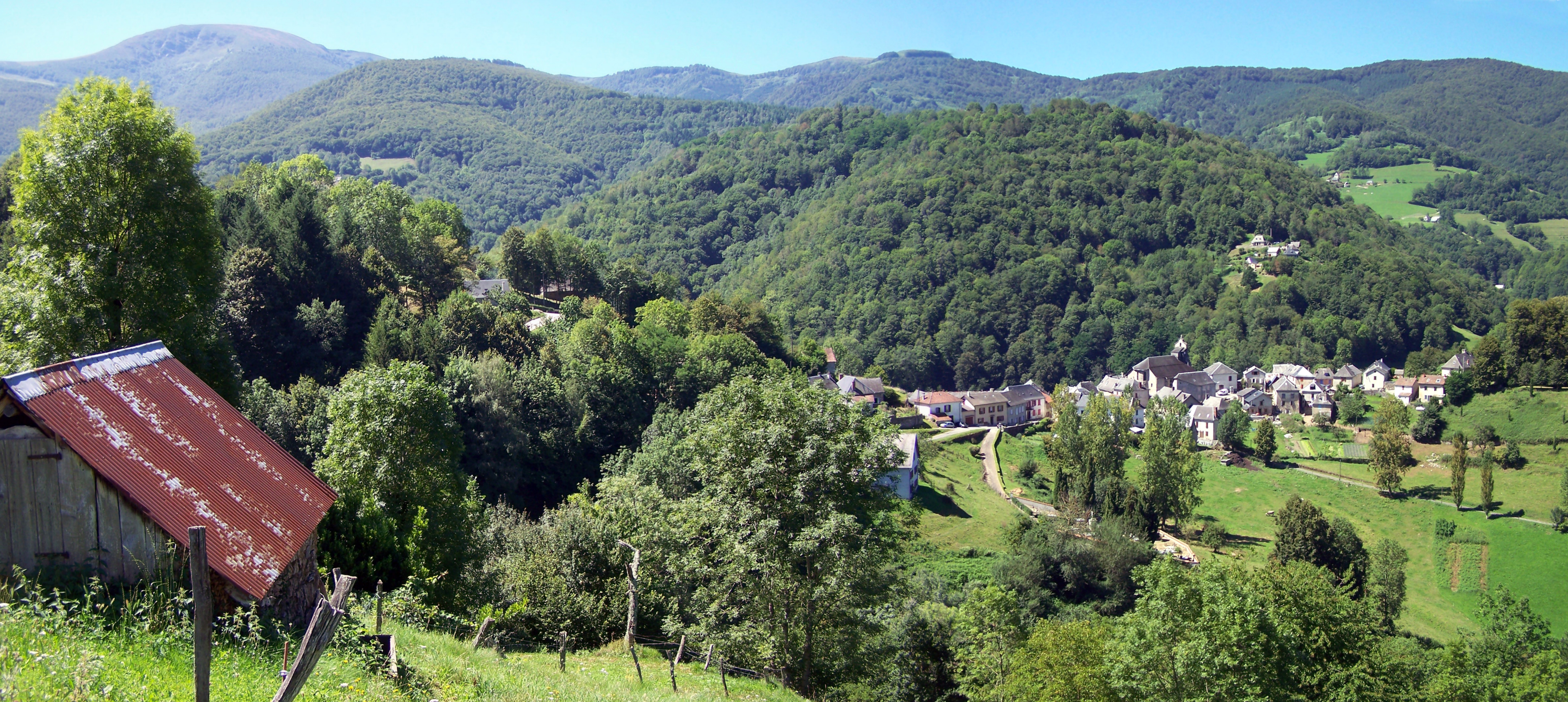
- A general view of Alos
- Location of Alos
- Location within France Location within Occitanie
- Coordinates: 42°54′33″N 1°08′45″E
- Country: France
- Region: Occitania
- Department: Ariège
- Arrondissement: Saint-Girons
- Canton: Couserans Est
- Intercommunality: Couserans-Pyrénées

Government
  - Mayor (2020–2026): Alain Tortet
- Area^{1}: 24.26 km^{2} (9.37 sq mi)
- Elevation: 650 m (2,130 ft)
- Highest elevation: 1,874 m (6,148 ft)
- Lowest elevation: 553 m (1,814 ft)
- Population (2023): 116
  - Density: 4.78/km^{2} (12.4/sq mi)
- Time zone: UTC+01:00 (CET)
  - Summer (DST): UTC+02:00 (CEST)
- INSEE/Postal code: 09008 /09200
- ^{1} French Land Register data, which excludes lakes, ponds, glaciers > 1 km^{2} (0.386 sq mi or 247 acres) and river estuaries.

Alos (Occitan: Alòs) is a commune in the Ariège department in the Occitanie region of southwestern France.

== Geography ==
Alos is located some 100 km south by south-west of Toulouse, about 40 km west of Foix, and about 10 km north of the Spanish border. It is a high mountain commune with only three tortuous access roads: the D37 branching west from the D3 south of Lacourt enters the commune in the northeast and continues to the village before continuing south-east to join the D17 road north of Seix. There is also the D137 road coming south-west from Moulis which enters the commune in the north and joins the D37 near the village. Apart from Alos there are the hamlets of Artiguenard and La Riviere in the commune. There are numerous small country roads throughout much of the commune which consists mainly of mountain slopes and forests.

The Riviere d'Alois flows out of the north-east to join the Salat river to the east. Numerous streams feed into the Alois including the Raven de Guerbrens which forms part of the eastern border and the Ruisseau de Argeniere which flows from the south of the commune. Many other streams flow into the Alois from all corners of the commune.

== Administration ==
List of Successive Mayors of Alos

From	To	Name
2001	2014	André Pujol
2014	2026	Alain Tortet

== Population ==
The inhabitants of the commune are known as Alosiens or Alosiennes in French.

Historical population
Year	Pop.	±% p.a.
1968	260	—
1975	212	−2.87%
1982	173	−2.86%
1990	136	−2.96%
1999	131	−0.42%
2007	119	−1.19%
2012	125	+0.99%
2017	117	−1.31%
2023	116	−0.14%
Source: INSEE

== See also ==
- Communes of the Ariège department
