= Alzen =

Commune in Occitanie, France

- Commune
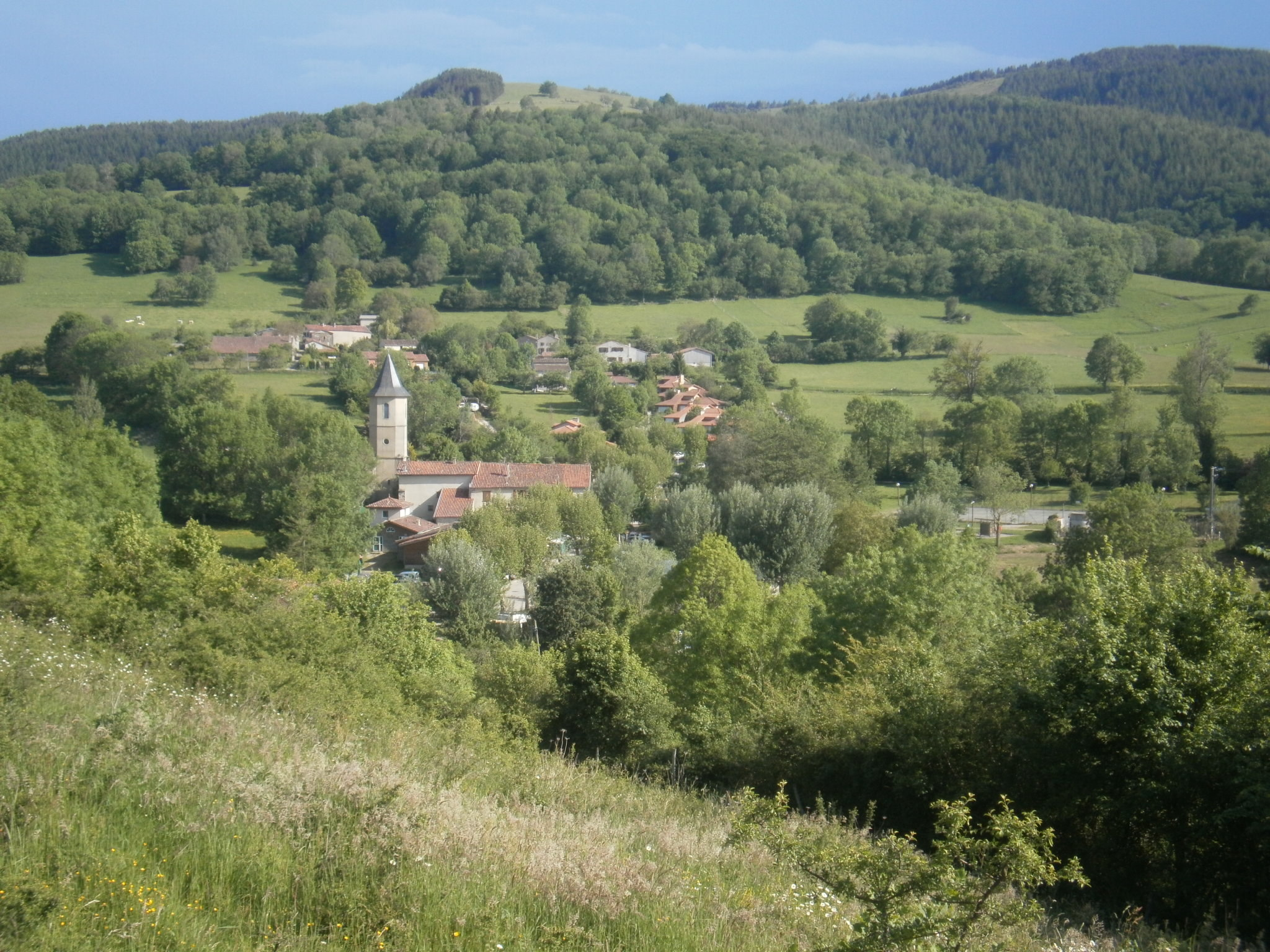
- A general view of Alzen
- Location of Alzen
- Location within France Location within Occitanie
- Coordinates: 42°59′25″N 1°28′23″E
- Country: France
- Region: Occitania
- Department: Ariège
- Arrondissement: Saint-Girons
- Canton: Couserans Est
- Intercommunality: Couserans-Pyrénées

Government
  - Mayor (2020–2026): Christian Gabet
- Area^{1}: 17.87 km^{2} (6.90 sq mi)
- Elevation: 650 m (2,130 ft)
- Highest elevation: 1,173 m (3,848 ft)
- Lowest elevation: 430 m (1,410 ft)
- Population (2023): 262
  - Density: 14.7/km^{2} (38.0/sq mi)
- Time zone: UTC+01:00 (CET)
  - Summer (DST): UTC+02:00 (CEST)
- INSEE/Postal code: 09009 /09240
- ^{1} French Land Register data, which excludes lakes, ponds, glaciers > 1 km^{2} (0.386 sq mi or 247 acres) and river estuaries.

Alzen (French pronunciation: [alzɛ̃]; Occitan: Alzenh) is a commune in the Ariège department in southwestern France.

== Population ==
Inhabitants of Alzen are called Alzenois in French.

Historical population
Year	Pop.	±% p.a.
1968	83	—
1975	63	−3.86%
1982	81	+3.66%
1990	113	+4.25%
1999	163	+4.15%
2007	209	+3.16%
2012	227	+1.67%
2017	260	+2.75%
2023	262	+0.13%
Source: INSEE

== See also ==
- Communes of the Ariège department
