= Encourtiech =

Commune in Occitanie, France

- Commune
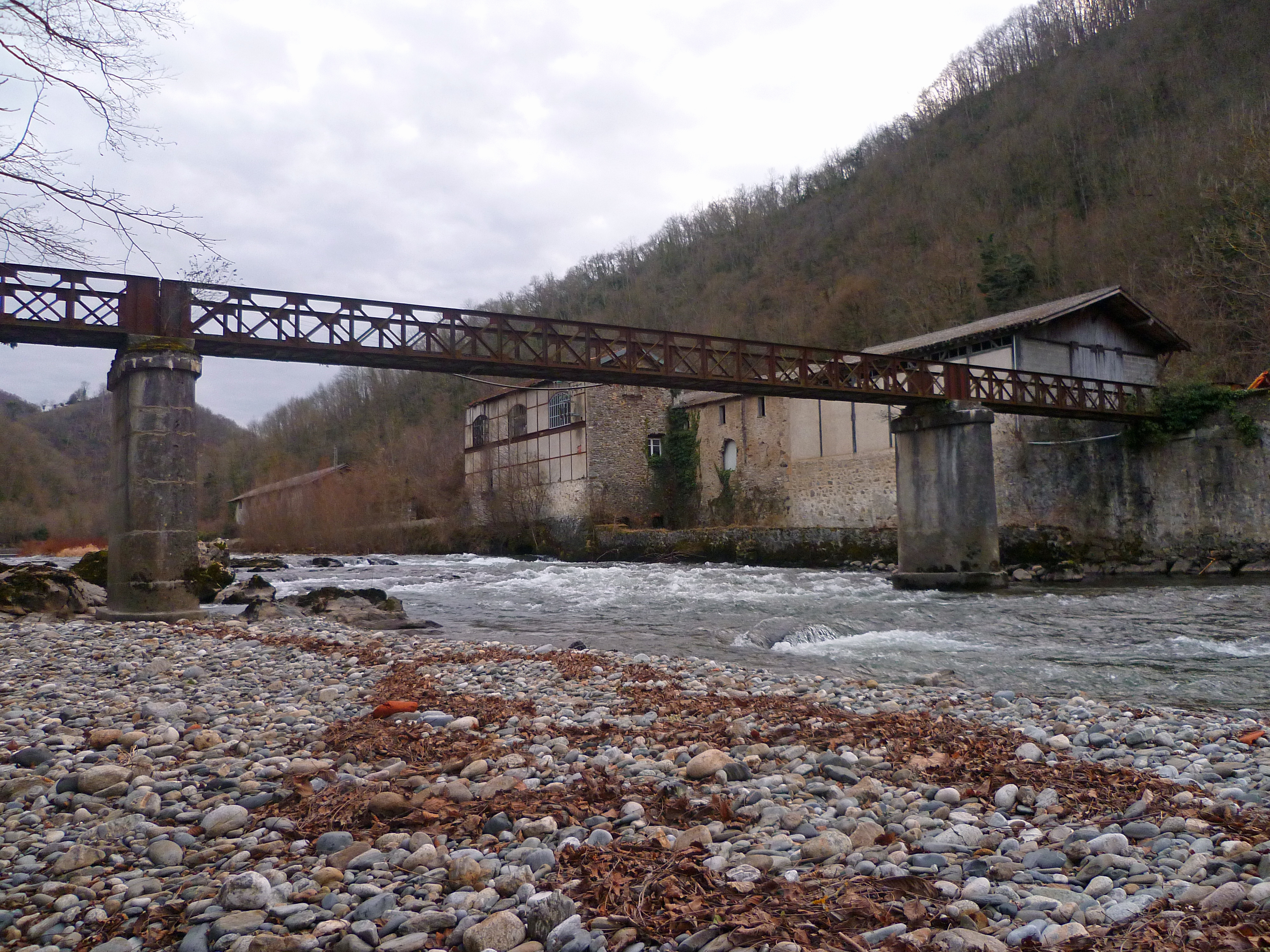
- A disused walkway over the Salat at La Borye, in Encourtiech
- Location of Encourtiech
- Location within France Location within Occitanie
- Coordinates: 42°57′37″N 1°10′59″E
- Country: France
- Region: Occitania
- Department: Ariège
- Arrondissement: Saint-Girons
- Canton: Couserans Est

Government
  - Mayor (2020–2026): Jean-Claude Dedieu
- Area^{1}: 4.78 km^{2} (1.85 sq mi)
- Elevation: 700 m (2,300 ft)
- Highest elevation: 858 m (2,815 ft)
- Lowest elevation: 409 m (1,342 ft)
- Population (2023): 100
  - Density: 21/km^{2} (54/sq mi)
- Time zone: UTC+01:00 (CET)
  - Summer (DST): UTC+02:00 (CEST)
- INSEE/Postal code: 09110 /09200
- ^{1} French Land Register data, which excludes lakes, ponds, glaciers > 1 km^{2} (0.386 sq mi or 247 acres) and river estuaries.

Encourtiech is a commune in the Ariège department in southwestern France.

== Population ==
Historical population
Year	Pop.	±% p.a.
1968	131	—
1975	102	−3.51%
1982	100	−0.28%
1990	91	−1.17%
1999	84	−0.89%
2007	101	+2.33%
2012	95	−1.22%
2017	90	−1.08%
2023	100	+1.77%
Source: INSEE

== See also ==
- Communes of the Ariège department
