= Montagagne =

Commune in Occitanie, France

- Commune
- Location of Montagagne
- Location within France Location within Occitanie
- Coordinates: 42°58′34″N 1°24′41″E
- Country: France
- Region: Occitania
- Department: Ariège
- Arrondissement: Saint-Girons
- Canton: Couserans Est

Government
  - Mayor (2020–2026): Céline Malgat
- Area^{1}: 7.06 km^{2} (2.73 sq mi)
- Elevation: 900 m (3,000 ft)
- Highest elevation: 1,386 m (4,547 ft)
- Lowest elevation: 469 m (1,539 ft)
- Population (2023): 82
  - Density: 12/km^{2} (30/sq mi)
- Time zone: UTC+01:00 (CET)
  - Summer (DST): UTC+02:00 (CEST)
- INSEE/Postal code: 09196 /09240
- ^{1} French Land Register data, which excludes lakes, ponds, glaciers > 1 km^{2} (0.386 sq mi or 247 acres) and river estuaries.

Montagagne (French pronunciation: [mɔ̃taɡaɲ]; Occitan: Montaganha) is a commune in the Ariège department in southwestern France.

== Population ==
Historical population
Year	Pop.	±% p.a.
1968	13	—
1975	9	−5.12%
1982	16	+8.57%
1990	19	+2.17%
1999	57	+12.98%
2007	43	−3.46%
2012	47	+1.79%
2017	76	+10.09%
2023	82	+1.27%
Source: INSEE

== See also ==
- Communes of the Ariège department
