= Esplas-de-Sérou =

Commune in Occitanie, France

- Commune
- Location of Esplas-de-Sérou
- Location within France Location within Occitanie
- Coordinates: 42°58′34″N 1°22′37″E
- Country: France
- Region: Occitania
- Department: Ariège
- Arrondissement: Saint-Girons
- Canton: Couserans Est

Government
  - Mayor (2022–2026): Nathalie Delort
- Area^{1}: 34.13 km^{2} (13.18 sq mi)
- Elevation: 700 m (2,300 ft)
- Highest elevation: 1,502 m (4,928 ft)
- Lowest elevation: 426 m (1,398 ft)
- Population (2023): 168
  - Density: 4.92/km^{2} (12.7/sq mi)
- Time zone: UTC+01:00 (CET)
  - Summer (DST): UTC+02:00 (CEST)
- INSEE/Postal code: 09118 /09420
- ^{1} French Land Register data, which excludes lakes, ponds, glaciers > 1 km^{2} (0.386 sq mi or 247 acres) and river estuaries.

Esplas-de-Sérou (Occitan: Esplas de Seru) is a commune in the Ariège department in southwestern France.

== Population ==
Historical population
Year	Pop.	±% p.a.
1968	133	—
1975	84	−6.35%
1982	120	+5.23%
1990	91	−3.40%
1999	143	+5.15%
2007	157	+1.17%
2012	165	+1.00%
2017	182	+1.98%
2023	168	−1.33%
Source: INSEE

== See also ==
- Communes of the Ariège department
