= Montseron =

Commune in Occitanie, France

- Commune
- Location of Montseron
- Location within France Location within Occitanie
- Coordinates: 43°01′10″N 1°19′31″E
- Country: France
- Region: Occitania
- Department: Ariège
- Arrondissement: Saint-Girons
- Canton: Couserans Est

Government
  - Mayor (2020–2026): Alain Pons
- Area^{1}: 8.88 km^{2} (3.43 sq mi)
- Elevation: 541 m (1,775 ft)
- Highest elevation: 580 m (1,900 ft)
- Lowest elevation: 335 m (1,099 ft)
- Population (2023): 100
  - Density: 11/km^{2} (29/sq mi)
- Time zone: UTC+01:00 (CET)
  - Summer (DST): UTC+02:00 (CEST)
- INSEE/Postal code: 09212 /09240
- ^{1} French Land Register data, which excludes lakes, ponds, glaciers > 1 km^{2} (0.386 sq mi or 247 acres) and river estuaries.

Montseron (French pronunciation: [mɔ̃səʁɔ̃]) is a commune in the Ariège department in southwestern France.

== Population ==
Historical population
Year	Pop.	±% p.a.
1968	105	—
1975	84	−3.14%
1982	85	+0.17%
1990	71	−2.22%
1999	66	−0.81%
2007	80	+2.43%
2012	79	−0.25%
2017	94	+3.54%
2023	100	+1.04%
Source: INSEE

== See also ==
- Communes of the Ariège department
