= Canton of Couserans Est =

Coordinates: 43.01°N 1.43°E

- Canton
- Situation of the canton of Couserans Est in the department of Ariège
- Country: France
- Region: Occitania
- Department: Ariège
- No. of communes: {{{nbcomm}}}
- Population (2023): 9,817
- INSEE code: 0903

The canton of Couserans Est is an administrative division of the Ariège department, southern France. It was created at the French canton reorganisation which came into effect in March 2015. Its seat is in La Bastide-de-Sérou.

It consists of the following communes:

1. Aigues-Juntes
2. Aleu
3. Allières
4. Alos
5. Alzen
6. Aulus-les-Bains
7. La Bastide-de-Sérou
8. Biert
9. Boussenac
10. Cadarcet
11. Castelnau-Durban
12. Clermont
13. Couflens
14. Durban-sur-Arize
15. Encourtiech
16. Ercé
17. Erp
18. Esplas-de-Sérou
19. Lacourt
20. Larbont
21. Lescure
22. Massat
23. Montagagne
24. Montels
25. Montseron
26. Nescus
27. Oust
28. Le Port
29. Rimont
30. Rivèrenert
31. Seix
32. Sentenac-d'Oust
33. Sentenac-de-Sérou
34. Soueix-Rogalle
35. Soulan
36. Suzan
37. Ustou
