= Soulan =

Commune in Occitanie, France

- Commune
- Location of Soulan
- Location within France Location within Occitanie
- Coordinates: 42°54′51″N 1°14′02″E
- Country: France
- Region: Occitania
- Department: Ariège
- Arrondissement: Saint-Girons
- Canton: Couserans Est

Government
  - Mayor (2020–2026): Michel Icart
- Area^{1}: 23.76 km^{2} (9.17 sq mi)
- Elevation: 607 m (1,991 ft)
- Highest elevation: 1,415 m (4,642 ft)
- Lowest elevation: 466 m (1,529 ft)
- Population (2023): 400
  - Density: 17/km^{2} (44/sq mi)
- Time zone: UTC+01:00 (CET)
  - Summer (DST): UTC+02:00 (CEST)
- INSEE/Postal code: 09301 /09320
- ^{1} French Land Register data, which excludes lakes, ponds, glaciers > 1 km^{2} (0.386 sq mi or 247 acres) and river estuaries.

Soulan (French pronunciation: [sulɑ̃]; Occitan: Solan de Coserans) is a commune in the Ariège department in southwestern France.

== Population ==
Inhabitants of Soulan are called Soulanais in French.

Historical population
Year	Pop.	±% p.a.
1968	411	—
1975	390	−0.75%
1982	335	−2.15%
1990	307	−1.09%
1999	324	+0.60%
2007	340	+0.60%
2012	361	+1.21%
2017	373	+0.66%
2023	400	+1.17%
Source: INSEE

== See also ==
- Communes of the Ariège department
