= Clermont, Ariège =

Commune in Occitanie, France

Clermont
- Commune
- Location of Clermont
- Location within France Location within Occitanie
- Coordinates: 43°02′25″N 1°18′07″E
- Country: France
- Region: Occitania
- Department: Ariège
- Arrondissement: Saint-Girons
- Canton: Couserans Est

Government
  - Mayor (2020–2026): Alex Mirouse
- Area^{1}: 7.41 km^{2} (2.86 sq mi)
- Elevation: 355 m (1,165 ft)
- Highest elevation: 571 m (1,873 ft)
- Lowest elevation: 344 m (1,129 ft)
- Population (2023): 117
  - Density: 15.8/km^{2} (40.9/sq mi)
- Time zone: UTC+01:00 (CET)
  - Summer (DST): UTC+02:00 (CEST)
- INSEE/Postal code: 09097 /09420
- ^{1} French Land Register data, which excludes lakes, ponds, glaciers > 1 km^{2} (0.386 sq mi or 247 acres) and river estuaries.

Clermont (French pronunciation: [klɛʁmɔ̃]; Occitan: Clarmont) is a commune in the Ariège department in southwestern France.

== Population ==
Historical population
Year	Pop.	±% p.a.
1968	102	—
1975	92	−1.46%
1982	90	−0.31%
1990	82	−1.16%
1999	101	+2.34%
2007	86	−1.99%
2012	104	+3.87%
2017	114	+1.85%
2023	117	+0.43%
Source: INSEE

== See also ==
- Communes of the Ariège department
