= Lescure, Ariège =

Commune in Occitanie, France

Lescure
- Commune
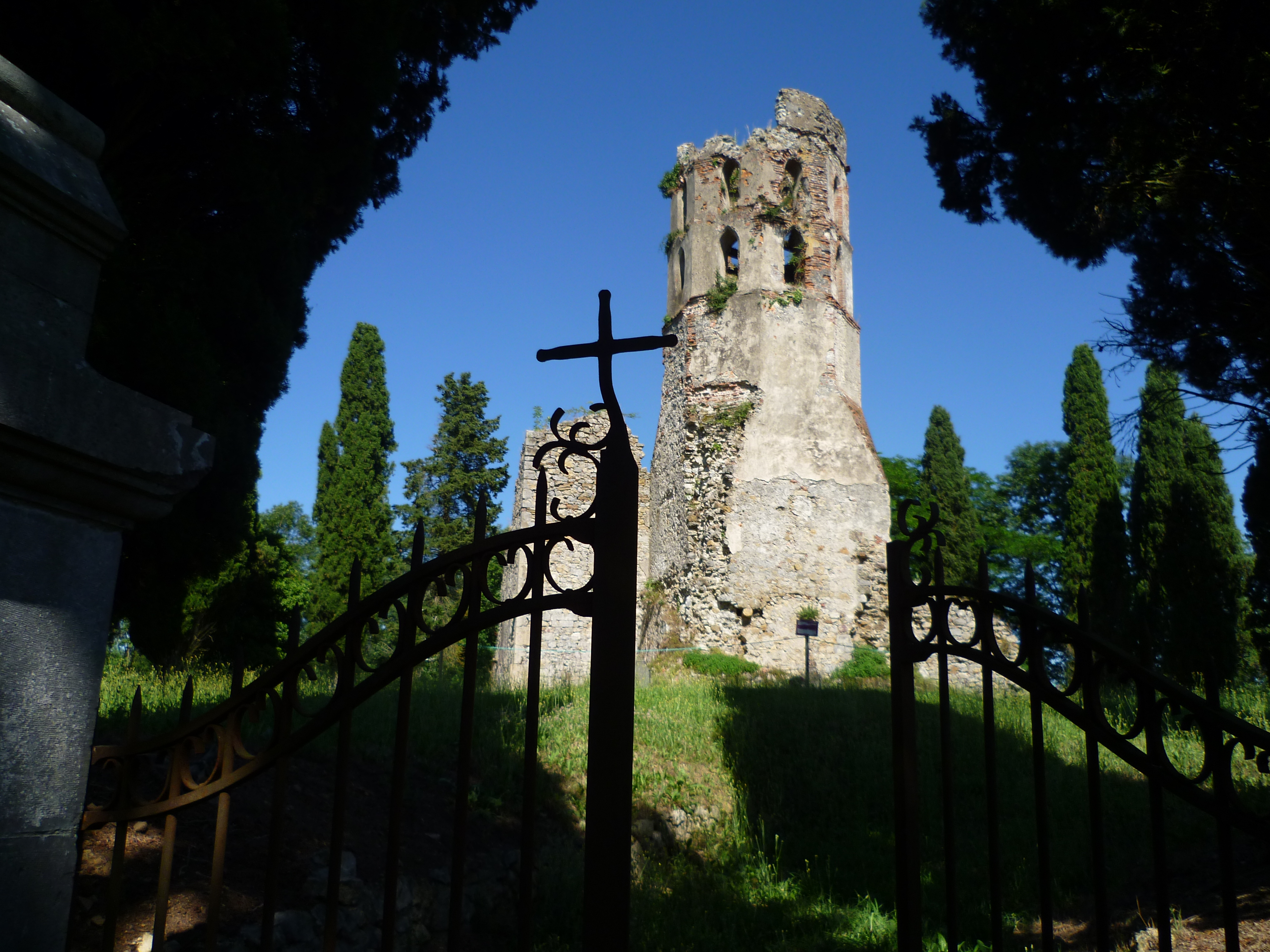
- The 12th Century church of Noguès

- Coat of arms
- Location of Lescure
- Location within France Location within Occitanie
- Coordinates: 43°00′05″N 1°14′03″E
- Country: France
- Region: Occitania
- Department: Ariège
- Arrondissement: Saint-Girons
- Canton: Couserans Est
- Intercommunality: Couserans-Pyrénées

Government
  - Mayor (2020–2026): Maryse Perigaud
- Area^{1}: 25.8 km^{2} (10.0 sq mi)
- Elevation: 493 m (1,617 ft)
- Highest elevation: 820 m (2,690 ft)
- Lowest elevation: 410 m (1,350 ft)
- Population (2023): 479
  - Density: 18.6/km^{2} (48.1/sq mi)
- Time zone: UTC+01:00 (CET)
  - Summer (DST): UTC+02:00 (CEST)
- INSEE/Postal code: 09164 /09420
- ^{1} French Land Register data, which excludes lakes, ponds, glaciers > 1 km^{2} (0.386 sq mi or 247 acres) and river estuaries.

Lescure (in Occitan Era Escura) is a commune, located in the department of Ariège in the region of Occitanie, in southern France.

Its inhabitants are called Escurois.

== Geography ==
Commune of the Pyrenees located in the urban area of Saint - Girons on the Baup . It is part of the Regional Natural Park of the Pyrenees ariégeoises .

== Politics and Administration ==
List of successive mayors
Term	Name	Party
2014–In progress	Maryse Perigaud	Ind.
2008–2014	Jean-Marie Monreysse	PS
2007–2008	Claude Pujol	PS
1984–2007	Michèle Eychenne	
1965–1984	Jean Dupuy	
1951–1965	Gaston Bareille	

== Demographics ==
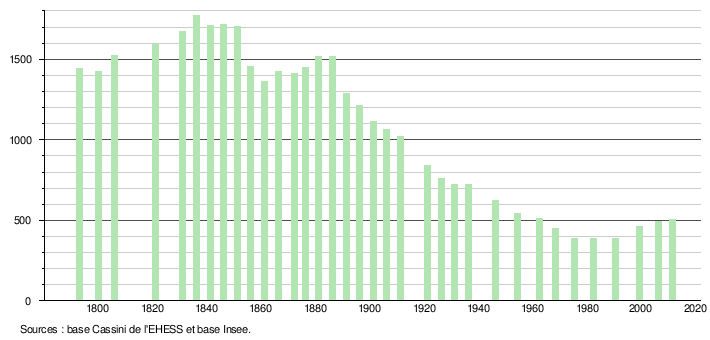
Lescure, Ariège demographics histogram

In 2014, the municipality had 501 inhabitants, a decrease of -1.18% compared with 2009 ( Ariège : 0.95%, France excluding Mayotte : 2.49%).

== Places and monuments ==
The bell tower of Nogues of the thirteenth century is located on the road to Santiago de Compostela. Place currently preserved by the association "Les Amis du Clocher de Nogues". The remains of this ancient church were listed historic monument by decree of June 6, 2012 .

== Personalities related to the commune ==
- Robert Redeker (born 1954), philosopher and writer
- Thierry Escaich (born 1965), organist and composer, born in Nogent-sur-Marne but part of the family of which is attached to Lescure.
- Raoul Béteille (1924-2015), magistrate

== See also ==
- Communes of the Ariège department
