= Rimont =

Commune in Occitanie, France

- Commune
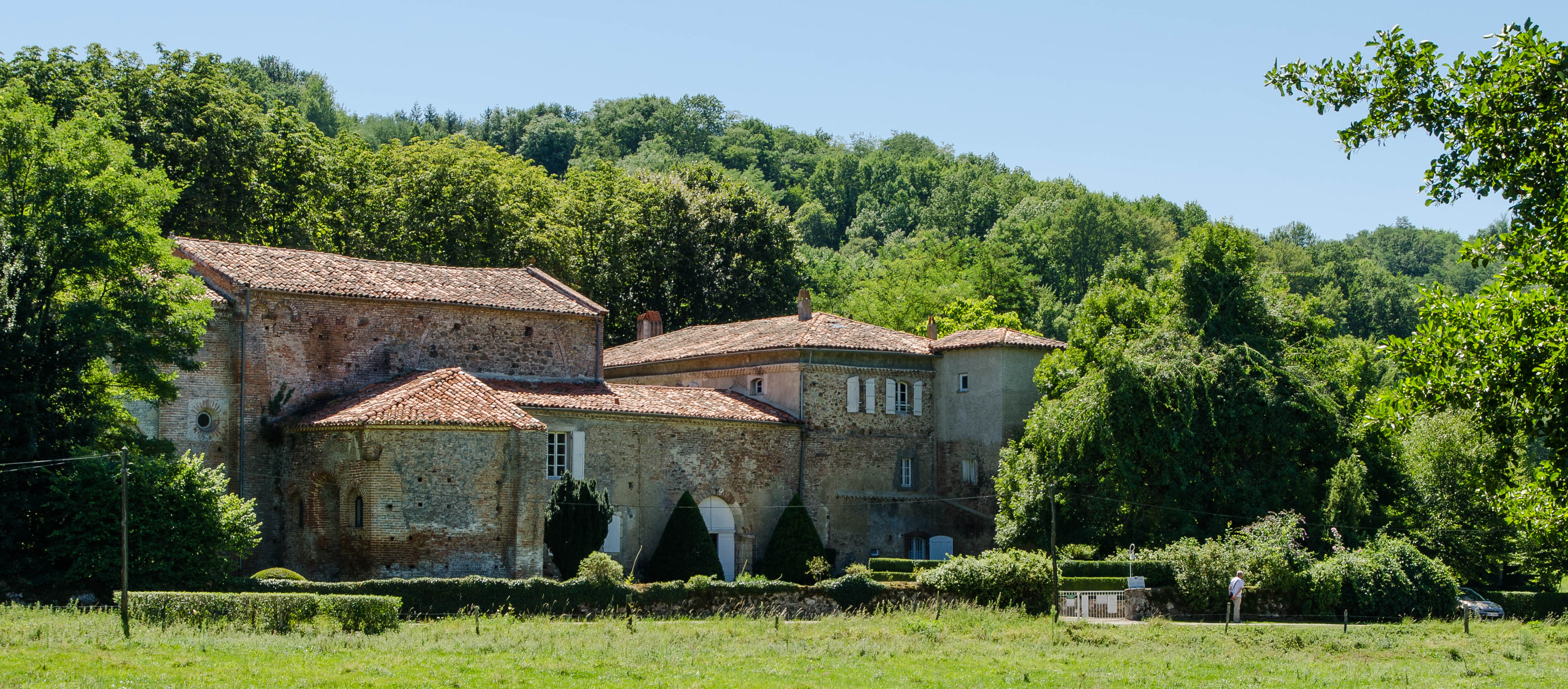
- Abbey of Combelongue

- Coat of arms
- Location of Rimont
- Location within France Location within Occitanie
- Coordinates: 42°59′47″N 1°17′01″E
- Country: France
- Region: Occitania
- Department: Ariège
- Arrondissement: Saint-Girons
- Canton: Couserans Est

Government
  - Mayor (2020–2026): Frédéric Bonnel
- Area^{1}: 28.4 km^{2} (11.0 sq mi)
- Elevation: 525 m (1,722 ft)
- Highest elevation: 1,059 m (3,474 ft)
- Lowest elevation: 386 m (1,266 ft)
- Population (2023): 542
  - Density: 19.1/km^{2} (49.4/sq mi)
- Time zone: UTC+01:00 (CET)
  - Summer (DST): UTC+02:00 (CEST)
- INSEE/Postal code: 09246 /09420
- ^{1} French Land Register data, which excludes lakes, ponds, glaciers > 1 km^{2} (0.386 sq mi or 247 acres) and river estuaries.

Rimont (French pronunciation: [ʁimɔ̃]) is a commune in the Ariège department in southwestern France.

== Population ==
Inhabitants of Rimont are called Rimontais in French.

Historical population
Year	Pop.	±% p.a.
1968	554	—
1975	519	−0.93%
1982	504	−0.42%
1990	513	+0.22%
1999	501	−0.26%
2007	531	+0.73%
2012	566	+1.28%
2017	530	−1.31%
2023	542	+0.37%
Source: INSEE

== See also ==
- Communes of the Ariège department
