= Sentenac-de-Sérou =

Commune in Occitanie, France

- Commune
- Location of Sentenac-de-Sérou
- Location within France Location within Occitanie
- Coordinates: 42°58′20″N 1°23′23″E
- Country: France
- Region: Occitania
- Department: Ariège
- Arrondissement: Saint-Girons
- Canton: Couserans Est

Government
  - Mayor (2020–2026): Anaïs Teychenné
- Area^{1}: 13.53 km^{2} (5.22 sq mi)
- Elevation: 825 m (2,707 ft)
- Highest elevation: 1,615 m (5,299 ft)
- Lowest elevation: 492 m (1,614 ft)
- Population (2023): 42
  - Density: 3.1/km^{2} (8.0/sq mi)
- Time zone: UTC+01:00 (CET)
  - Summer (DST): UTC+02:00 (CEST)
- INSEE/Postal code: 09292 /09240
- ^{1} French Land Register data, which excludes lakes, ponds, glaciers > 1 km^{2} (0.386 sq mi or 247 acres) and river estuaries.

Sentenac-de-Sérou (Occitan: Sentenac de Seru) is a commune in the Ariège department in southwestern France.

== Population ==
Historical population
Year	Pop.	±% p.a.
1968	22	—
1975	37	+7.71%
1982	40	+1.12%
1990	25	−5.71%
1999	41	+5.65%
2007	35	−1.96%
2012	36	+0.57%
2017	52	+7.63%
2023	42	−3.50%
Source: INSEE

Inhabitants of Sentenac-de-Sérou are called Sentenacois in French.

== See also ==
- Communes of the Ariège department
