= Couflens =

Commune in Occitanie, France

- Commune
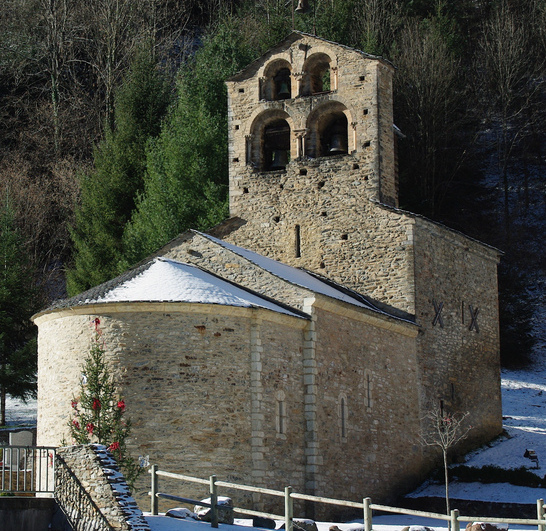
- The church in Salau
- Location of Couflens
- Location within France Location within Occitanie
- Coordinates: 42°47′17″N 1°11′14″E
- Country: France
- Region: Occitania
- Department: Ariège
- Arrondissement: Saint-Girons
- Canton: Couserans Est
- Intercommunality: Couserans-Pyrénées

Government
  - Mayor (2020–2026): Henry Richl
- Area^{1}: 56.26 km^{2} (21.72 sq mi)
- Elevation: 702 m (2,303 ft)
- Highest elevation: 2,865 m (9,400 ft)
- Lowest elevation: 559 m (1,834 ft)
- Population (2023): 100
  - Density: 1.8/km^{2} (4.6/sq mi)
- Time zone: UTC+01:00 (CET)
  - Summer (DST): UTC+02:00 (CEST)
- INSEE/Postal code: 09100 /09140
- ^{1} French Land Register data, which excludes lakes, ponds, glaciers > 1 km^{2} (0.386 sq mi or 247 acres) and river estuaries.

Couflens (Occitan: Conflenç) is a commune in the Ariège department in southwestern France.

== Population ==
Historical population
Year	Pop.	±% p.a.
1968	113	—
1975	371	+18.51%
1982	262	−4.85%
1990	70	−15.21%
1999	63	−1.16%
2007	81	+3.19%
2012	80	−0.25%
2017	86	+1.46%
2023	100	+2.55%
Source: INSEE

== Tourism and heritage ==
The commune has been awarded the “Commune à découvrir” label. (1.5 clocks in 2024)

== See also ==
- Communes of the Ariège department
