= Durban-sur-Arize =

Commune in Occitanie, France

- Commune
- Coat of arms
- Location of Durban-sur-Arize
- Location within France Location within Occitanie
- Coordinates: 43°01′13″N 1°20′42″E
- Country: France
- Region: Occitania
- Department: Ariège
- Arrondissement: Saint-Girons
- Canton: Couserans Est

Government
  - Mayor (2020–2026): Hervé Claustres
- Area^{1}: 6.75 km^{2} (2.61 sq mi)
- Elevation: 490 m (1,610 ft)
- Highest elevation: 622 m (2,041 ft)
- Lowest elevation: 335 m (1,099 ft)
- Population (2023): 181
  - Density: 26.8/km^{2} (69.5/sq mi)
- Time zone: UTC+01:00 (CET)
  - Summer (DST): UTC+02:00 (CEST)
- INSEE/Postal code: 09108 /09240
- ^{1} French Land Register data, which excludes lakes, ponds, glaciers > 1 km^{2} (0.386 sq mi or 247 acres) and river estuaries.

Durban-sur-Arize (French pronunciation: [dyʁbɑ̃ syʁ aʁiz], literally Durban on Arize; Occitan: Durban d'Arisa) is a commune in the Ariège department in southwestern France.

== Population ==
Historical population
Year	Pop.	±% p.a.
1968	183	—
1975	154	−2.43%
1982	135	−1.86%
1990	142	+0.63%
1999	135	−0.56%
2007	152	+1.49%
2012	178	+3.21%
2017	185	+0.77%
2023	181	−0.36%
Source: INSEE

== See also ==
- Communes of the Ariège department
