= Sentenac-d'Oust =

Commune in Occitanie, France

- Commune
- Location of Sentenac-d'Oust
- Location within France Location within Occitanie
- Coordinates: 42°52′36″N 1°10′43″E
- Country: France
- Region: Occitania
- Department: Ariège
- Arrondissement: Saint-Girons
- Canton: Couserans Est

Government
  - Mayor (2023–2026): Damien Duran
- Area^{1}: 18.38 km^{2} (7.10 sq mi)
- Elevation: 760 m (2,490 ft)
- Highest elevation: 2,304 m (7,559 ft)
- Lowest elevation: 592 m (1,942 ft)
- Population (2023): 110
  - Density: 6.0/km^{2} (16/sq mi)
- Time zone: UTC+01:00 (CET)
  - Summer (DST): UTC+02:00 (CEST)
- INSEE/Postal code: 09291 /09140
- ^{1} French Land Register data, which excludes lakes, ponds, glaciers > 1 km^{2} (0.386 sq mi or 247 acres) and river estuaries.

Sentenac-d'Oust is a commune in the Ariège department in southwestern France.

== Population ==
Inhabitants of Sentenac-d'Oust are called Sentenacais in French.

Historical population
Year	Pop.	±% p.a.
1968	148	—
1975	123	−2.61%
1982	98	−3.19%
1990	98	+0.00%
1999	96	−0.23%
2007	87	−1.22%
2012	99	+2.62%
2017	108	+1.76%
2023	110	+0.31%
Source: INSEE

== See also ==
- Communes of the Ariège department
