= Erp, Ariège =

Commune in Occitanie, France

Erp
- Commune
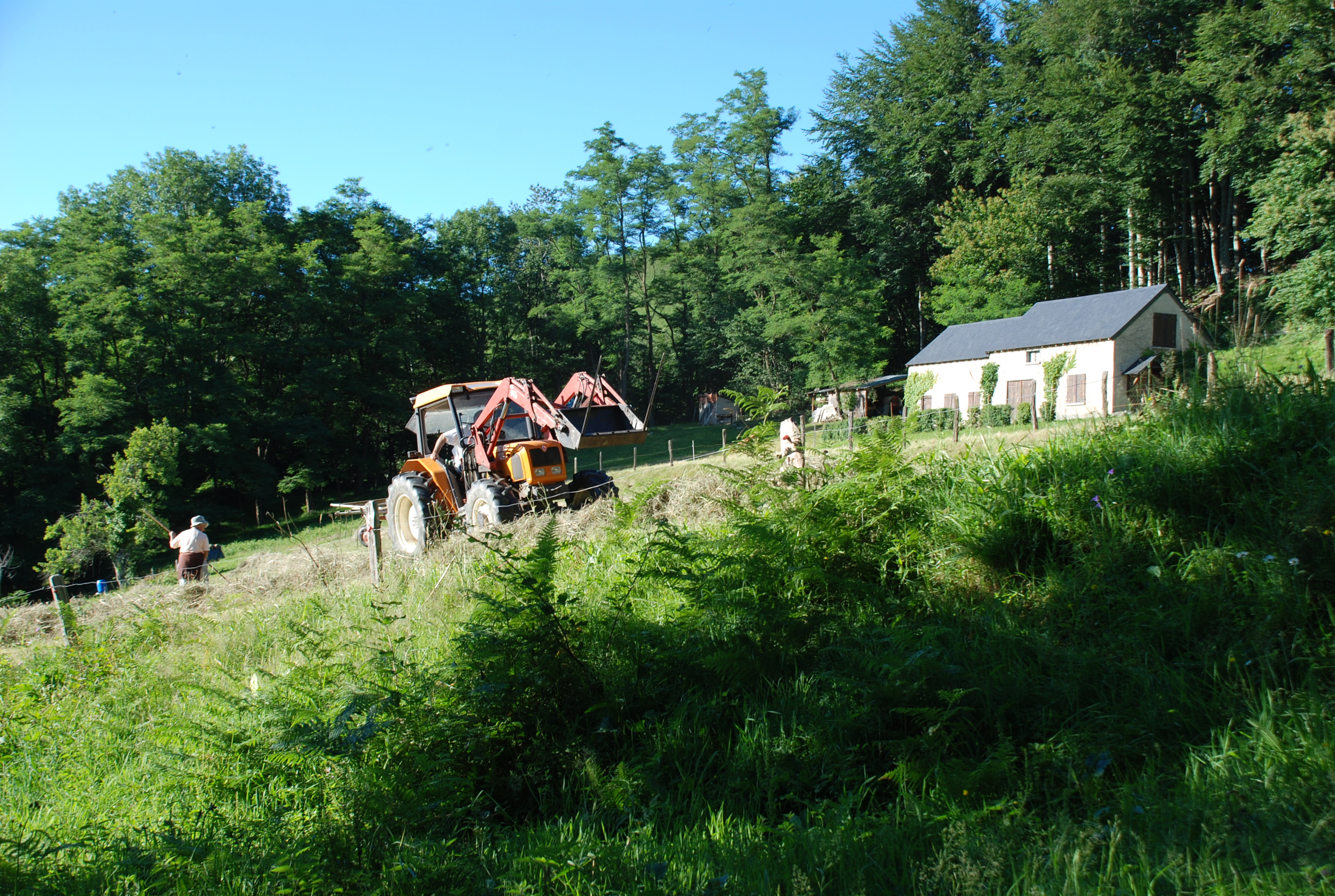
- Haymaking in Erp
- Location of Erp
- Location within France Location within Occitanie
- Coordinates: 42°56′33″N 1°12′04″E
- Country: France
- Region: Occitania
- Department: Ariège
- Arrondissement: Saint-Girons
- Canton: Couserans Est

Government
  - Mayor (2020–2026): Jean-Claude Déga
- Area^{1}: 9.24 km^{2} (3.57 sq mi)
- Elevation: 700 m (2,300 ft)
- Highest elevation: 1,208 m (3,963 ft)
- Lowest elevation: 428 m (1,404 ft)
- Population (2023): 142
  - Density: 15.4/km^{2} (39.8/sq mi)
- Time zone: UTC+01:00 (CET)
  - Summer (DST): UTC+02:00 (CEST)
- INSEE/Postal code: 09114 /09200
- ^{1} French Land Register data, which excludes lakes, ponds, glaciers > 1 km^{2} (0.386 sq mi or 247 acres) and river estuaries.

Erp (French pronunciation: [ɛʁp]; Occitan: Èrp) is a commune in the Ariège department in southwestern France.

== Population ==
Inhabitants are called Erpois in French.

Historical population
Year	Pop.	±% p.a.
1968	109	—
1975	114	+0.64%
1982	105	−1.17%
1990	88	−2.18%
1999	102	+1.65%
2007	120	+2.05%
2012	141	+3.28%
2017	121	−3.01%
2023	142	+2.70%
Source: INSEE

== See also ==
- Communes of the Ariège department
