= Soueix-Rogalle =

Commune in Occitanie, France

- Commune
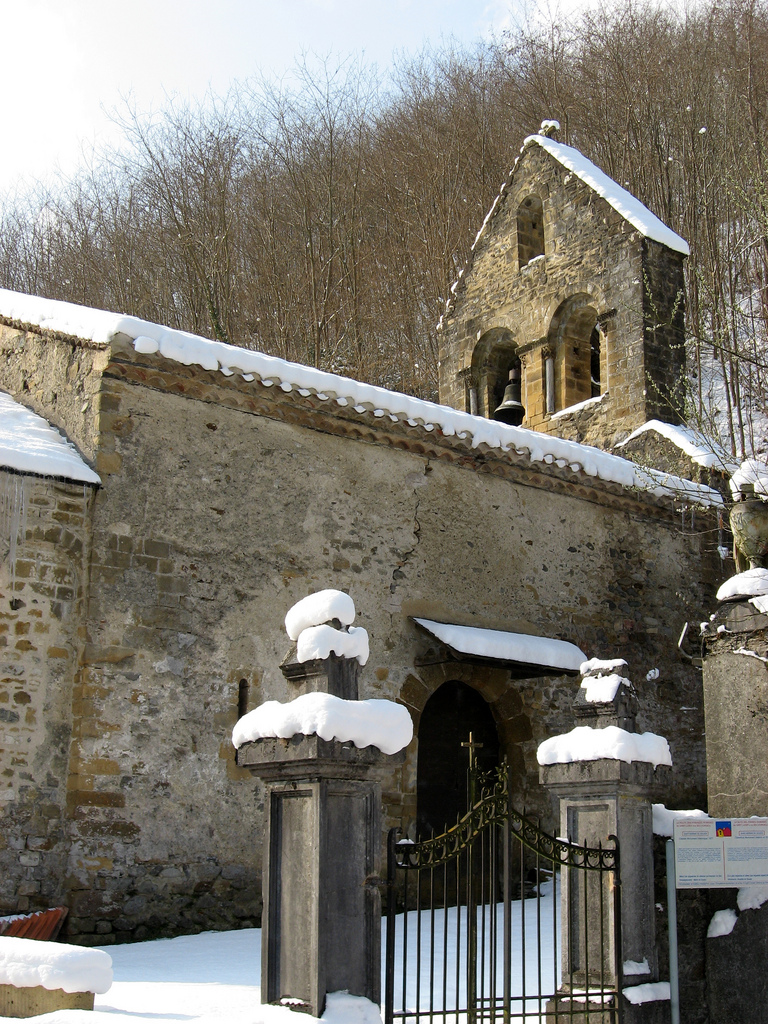
- The chapel in Soueix-Rogalle
- Location of Soueix-Rogalle
- Location within France Location within Occitanie
- Coordinates: 42°53′39″N 1°12′44″E
- Country: France
- Region: Occitania
- Department: Ariège
- Arrondissement: Saint-Girons
- Canton: Couserans Est

Government
  - Mayor (2020–2026): Christiane Bonté
- Area^{1}: 13.65 km^{2} (5.27 sq mi)
- Elevation: 483 m (1,585 ft)
- Highest elevation: 1,120 m (3,670 ft)
- Lowest elevation: 463 m (1,519 ft)
- Population (2023): 421
  - Density: 30.8/km^{2} (79.9/sq mi)
- Time zone: UTC+01:00 (CET)
  - Summer (DST): UTC+02:00 (CEST)
- INSEE/Postal code: 09299 /09140
- ^{1} French Land Register data, which excludes lakes, ponds, glaciers > 1 km^{2} (0.386 sq mi or 247 acres) and river estuaries.

Soueix-Rogalle (French pronunciation: [swɛks ʁɔɡal]; Occitan: Soèish e Rogala, before 1992: Soueix) is a commune in the Ariège department in southwestern France. It was created in 1973 by the merger of two former communes: Soueix and Rogalle.

== Population ==
Inhabitants of Soueix-Rogalle are called Soueissois in French.

Historical population
Year	Pop.	±% p.a.
1968	345	—
1975	347	+0.08%
1982	312	−1.51%
1990	348	+1.37%
1999	361	+0.41%
2007	360	−0.03%
2012	405	+2.38%
2017	418	+0.63%
2023	421	+0.12%
Source: INSEE

== See also ==
- Communes of the Ariège department
