= Nescus =

Commune in Occitanie, France

- Commune
- Location of Nescus
- Location within France Location within Occitanie
- Coordinates: 42°59′35″N 1°25′58″E
- Country: France
- Region: Occitania
- Department: Ariège
- Arrondissement: Saint-Girons
- Canton: Couserans Est

Government
  - Mayor (2020–2026): Geneviève Amardeilh
- Area^{1}: 3 km^{2} (1.2 sq mi)
- Elevation: 416 m (1,365 ft)
- Highest elevation: 680 m (2,230 ft)
- Lowest elevation: 415 m (1,362 ft)
- Population (2023): 59
  - Density: 20/km^{2} (51/sq mi)
- Time zone: UTC+01:00 (CET)
  - Summer (DST): UTC+02:00 (CEST)
- INSEE/Postal code: 09216 /09240
- ^{1} French Land Register data, which excludes lakes, ponds, glaciers > 1 km^{2} (0.386 sq mi or 247 acres) and river estuaries.

Nescus is a commune in the Ariège department in southwestern France.

== Population ==
Historical population
Year	Pop.	±% p.a.
1968	41	—
1975	41	+0.00%
1982	38	−1.08%
1990	40	+0.64%
1999	61	+4.80%
2007	69	+1.55%
2012	66	−0.89%
2017	62	−1.24%
2023	59	−0.82%
Source: INSEE

Inhabitants are called Nescuséens in French.

== See also ==
- Communes of the Ariège department
