= Boussenac =

Commune in Occitanie, France

- Commune
- Location of Boussenac
- Location within France Location within Occitanie
- Coordinates: 42°54′18″N 1°22′12″E
- Country: France
- Region: Occitania
- Department: Ariège
- Arrondissement: Saint-Girons
- Canton: Couserans Est

Government
  - Mayor (2023–2026): Claudine Couplan
- Area^{1}: 26 km^{2} (10 sq mi)
- Elevation: 795 m (2,608 ft)
- Highest elevation: 1,645 m (5,397 ft)
- Lowest elevation: 636 m (2,087 ft)
- Population (2023): 246
  - Density: 9.5/km^{2} (25/sq mi)
- Time zone: UTC+01:00 (CET)
  - Summer (DST): UTC+02:00 (CEST)
- INSEE/Postal code: 09065 /09320
- ^{1} French Land Register data, which excludes lakes, ponds, glaciers > 1 km^{2} (0.386 sq mi or 247 acres) and river estuaries.

Boussenac is a commune in the Ariège department of southwestern France.

== Population ==
Historical population
| Year | Pop. | ±% p.a. |
|---|---|---|
| 1968 | 306 | — |
| 1975 | 227 | −4.18% |
| 1982 | 213 | −0.91% |
| 1990 | 172 | −2.64% |
| 1999 | 184 | +0.75% |
| 2007 | 188 | +0.27% |
| 2012 | 190 | +0.21% |
| 2017 | 214 | +2.41% |
| 2023 | 246 | +2.35% |
Source: INSEE

Inhabitants of Boussenac are called Boussenacais in French.

== See also ==
- Communes of the Ariège department
