= Lacourt =

Commune in Occitanie, France

- Commune
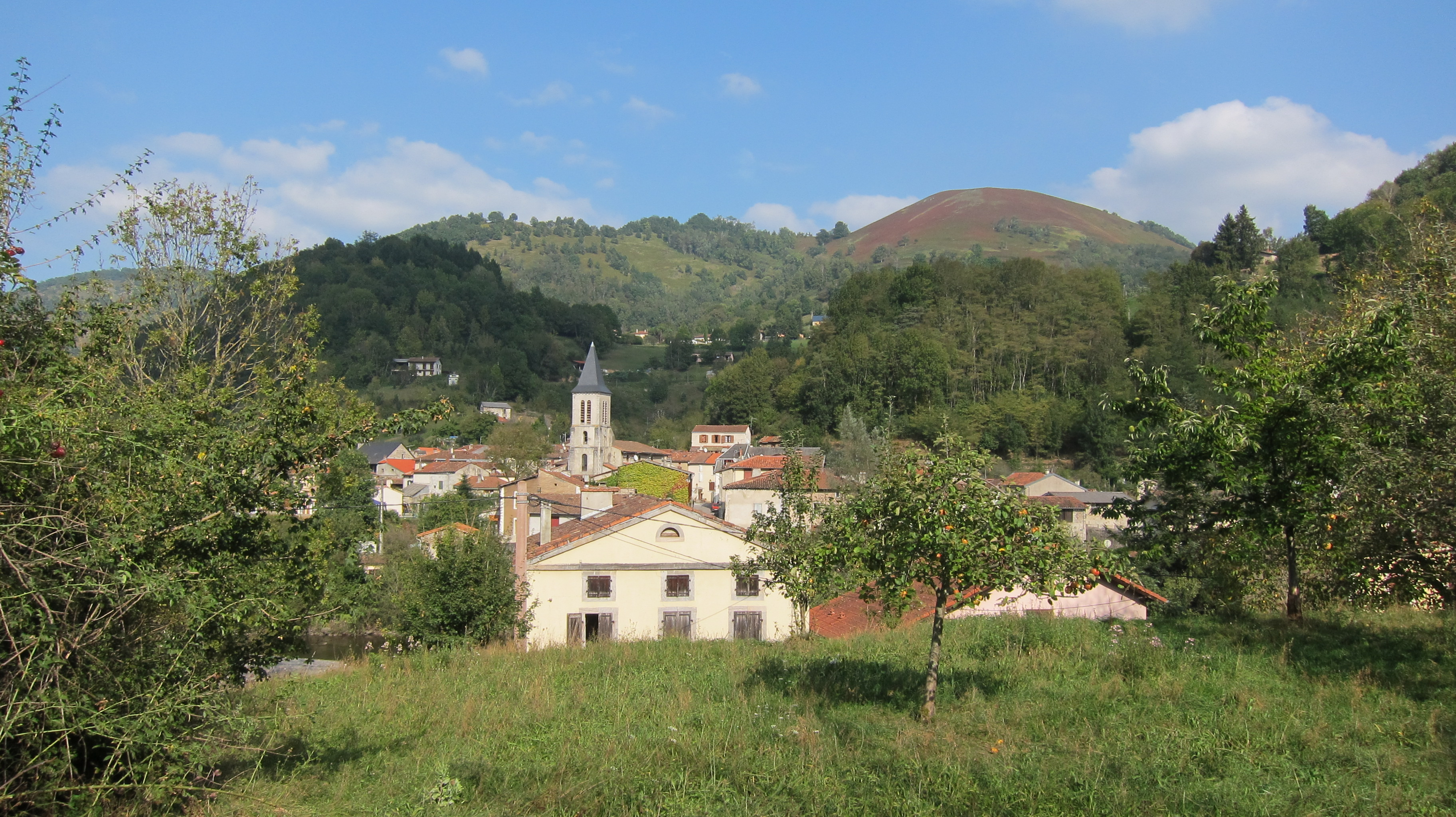
- A general view of Lacourt
- Location of Lacourt
- Location within France Location within Occitanie
- Coordinates: 42°56′49″N 1°10′32″E
- Country: France
- Region: Occitania
- Department: Ariège
- Arrondissement: Saint-Girons
- Canton: Couserans Est

Government
  - Mayor (2020–2026): Richard Petitalot
- Area^{1}: 16.5 km^{2} (6.4 sq mi)
- Elevation: 420 m (1,380 ft)
- Highest elevation: 1,232 m (4,042 ft)
- Lowest elevation: 411 m (1,348 ft)
- Population (2023): 205
  - Density: 12.4/km^{2} (32.2/sq mi)
- Time zone: UTC+01:00 (CET)
  - Summer (DST): UTC+02:00 (CEST)
- INSEE/Postal code: 09149 /09200
- ^{1} French Land Register data, which excludes lakes, ponds, glaciers > 1 km^{2} (0.386 sq mi or 247 acres) and river estuaries.

Lacourt (French pronunciation: [lakuʁ]; Occitan: La Cort) is a commune in the Ariège department in southwestern France.

== Population ==
Historical population
Year	Pop.	±% p.a.
1968	429	—
1975	356	−2.63%
1982	361	+0.20%
1990	279	−3.17%
1999	264	−0.61%
2007	203	−3.23%
2012	197	−0.60%
2017	196	−0.10%
2023	205	+0.75%
Source: INSEE

== See also ==
- Communes of the Ariège department
