= Larbont =

Commune in Occitanie, France

- Commune
- Location of Larbont
- Location within France Location within Occitanie
- Coordinates: 42°59′33″N 1°24′07″E
- Country: France
- Region: Occitania
- Department: Ariège
- Arrondissement: Saint-Girons
- Canton: Couserans Est

Government
  - Mayor (2020–2026): Jean-Louis Eychenne
- Area^{1}: 6.17 km^{2} (2.38 sq mi)
- Elevation: 618 m (2,028 ft)
- Highest elevation: 722 m (2,369 ft)
- Lowest elevation: 409 m (1,342 ft)
- Population (2023): 60
  - Density: 9.7/km^{2} (25/sq mi)
- Time zone: UTC+01:00 (CET)
  - Summer (DST): UTC+02:00 (CEST)
- INSEE/Postal code: 09154 /09240
- ^{1} French Land Register data, which excludes lakes, ponds, glaciers > 1 km^{2} (0.386 sq mi or 247 acres) and river estuaries.

Larbont (French pronunciation: [laʁbɔ̃]) is a commune in the Ariège department in southwestern France.

== Population ==
Historical population
Year	Pop.	±% p.a.
1968	53	—
1975	38	−4.64%
1982	24	−6.35%
1990	43	+7.56%
1999	47	+0.99%
2007	40	−2.00%
2012	44	+1.92%
2017	57	+5.31%
2023	60	+0.86%
Source: INSEE

== See also ==
- Communes of the Ariège department
