= Le Port, Ariège =

Commune in Occitanie, France

Le Port
- Commune
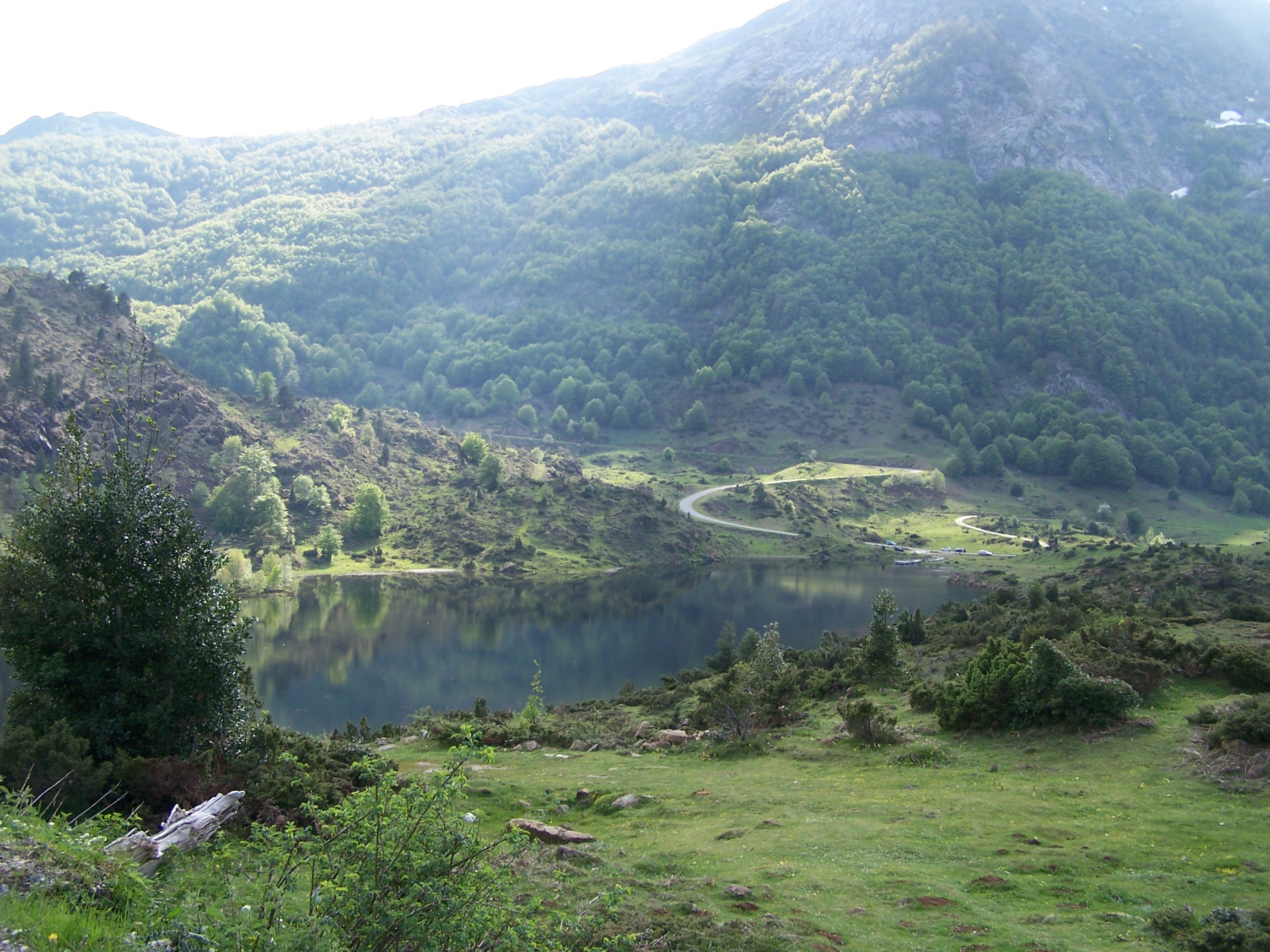
- The Étang de Lers, in Le Port
- Location of Le Port
- Location within France Location within Occitanie
- Coordinates: 42°52′12″N 1°22′25″E
- Country: France
- Region: Occitania
- Department: Ariège
- Arrondissement: Saint-Girons
- Canton: Couserans Est
- Intercommunality: Couserans-Pyrénées

Government
  - Mayor (2020–2026): Noëlle Moralès
- Area^{1}: 49.87 km^{2} (19.25 sq mi)
- Elevation: 710 m (2,330 ft)
- Highest elevation: 2,196 m (7,205 ft)
- Lowest elevation: 666 m (2,185 ft)
- Population (2023): 169
  - Density: 3.39/km^{2} (8.78/sq mi)
- Time zone: UTC+01:00 (CET)
  - Summer (DST): UTC+02:00 (CEST)
- INSEE/Postal code: 09231 /09320
- ^{1} French Land Register data, which excludes lakes, ponds, glaciers > 1 km^{2} (0.386 sq mi or 247 acres) and river estuaries.

Le Port (French pronunciation: [lə pɔʁ]; Occitan: Le Pòrt) is a commune in the Ariège department in southwestern France.

== Population ==
Inhabitants of Le Port are called Portais in French.

Historical population
Year	Pop.	±% p.a.
1968	211	—
1975	188	−1.64%
1982	198	+0.74%
1990	183	−0.98%
1999	190	+0.42%
2007	201	+0.71%
2012	190	−1.12%
2017	154	−4.11%
2023	169	+1.56%
Source: INSEE

== See also ==
- Communes of the Ariège department
