= Rivèrenert =

Commune in Occitanie, France

- Commune
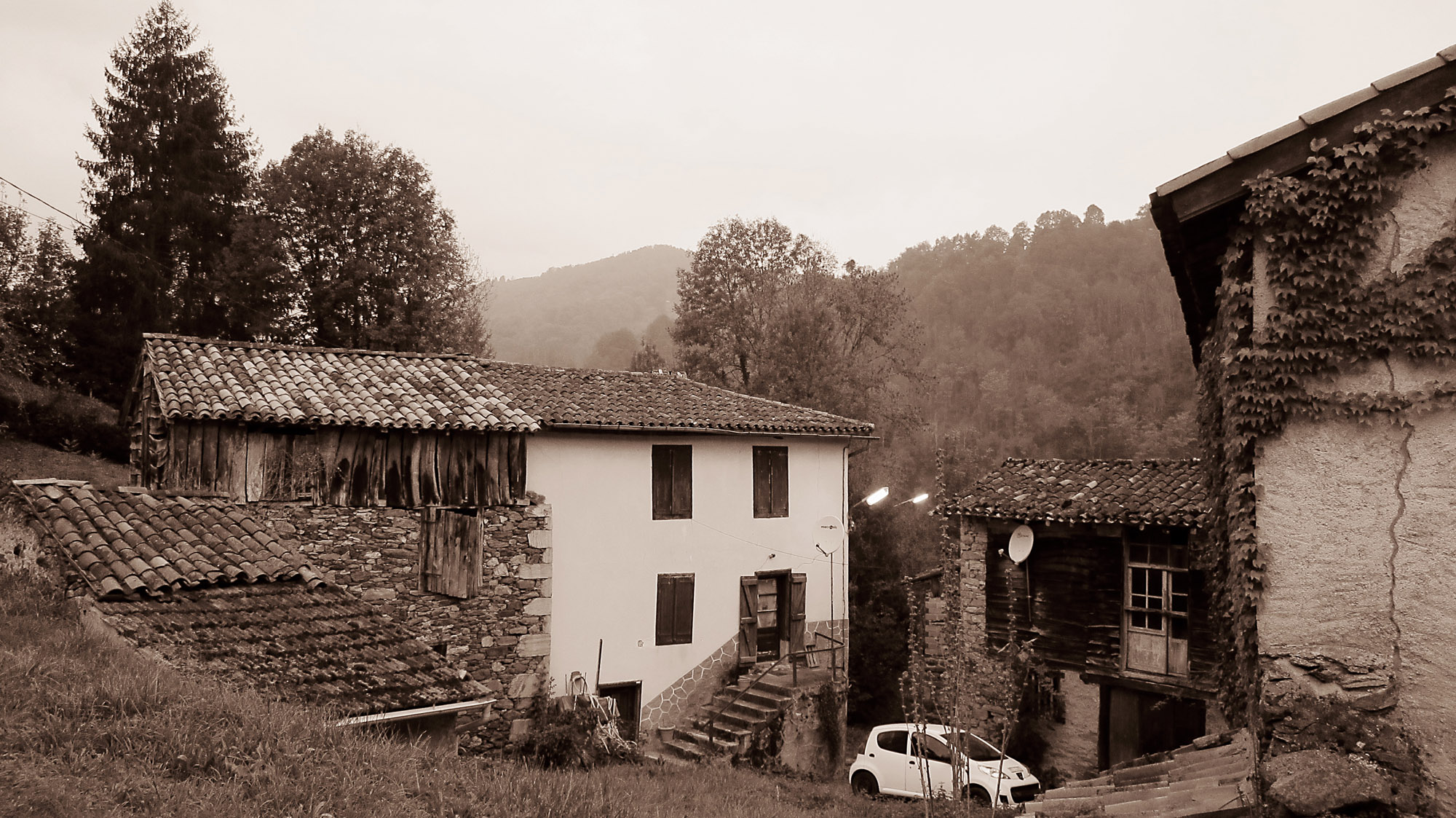
- The centre of Rivèrenert
- Location of Rivèrenert
- Location within France Location within Occitanie
- Coordinates: 42°57′28″N 1°13′46″E
- Country: France
- Region: Occitania
- Department: Ariège
- Arrondissement: Saint-Girons
- Canton: Couserans Est

Government
  - Mayor (2020–2026): Richard Meynard
- Area^{1}: 28.81 km^{2} (11.12 sq mi)
- Elevation: 480 m (1,570 ft)
- Highest elevation: 1,415 m (4,642 ft)
- Lowest elevation: 462 m (1,516 ft)
- Population (2023): 208
  - Density: 7.22/km^{2} (18.7/sq mi)
- Time zone: UTC+01:00 (CET)
  - Summer (DST): UTC+02:00 (CEST)
- INSEE/Postal code: 09247 /09200
- ^{1} French Land Register data, which excludes lakes, ponds, glaciers > 1 km^{2} (0.386 sq mi or 247 acres) and river estuaries.

Rivèrenert (French pronunciation: [ʁivɛʁnɛʁ]; Occitan: Ribèra Nert) is a commune in the Ariège department in southwestern France.

== Population ==
Inhabitants are called Rivèrenertais in French.

Historical population
Year	Pop.	±% p.a.
1968	298	—
1975	218	−4.37%
1982	174	−3.17%
1990	156	−1.36%
1999	135	−1.59%
2007	179	+3.59%
2012	189	+1.09%
2017	170	−2.10%
2023	208	+3.42%
Source: INSEE

== See also ==
- Communes of the Ariège department
