= Biert =

Commune in Occitanie, France

- Commune
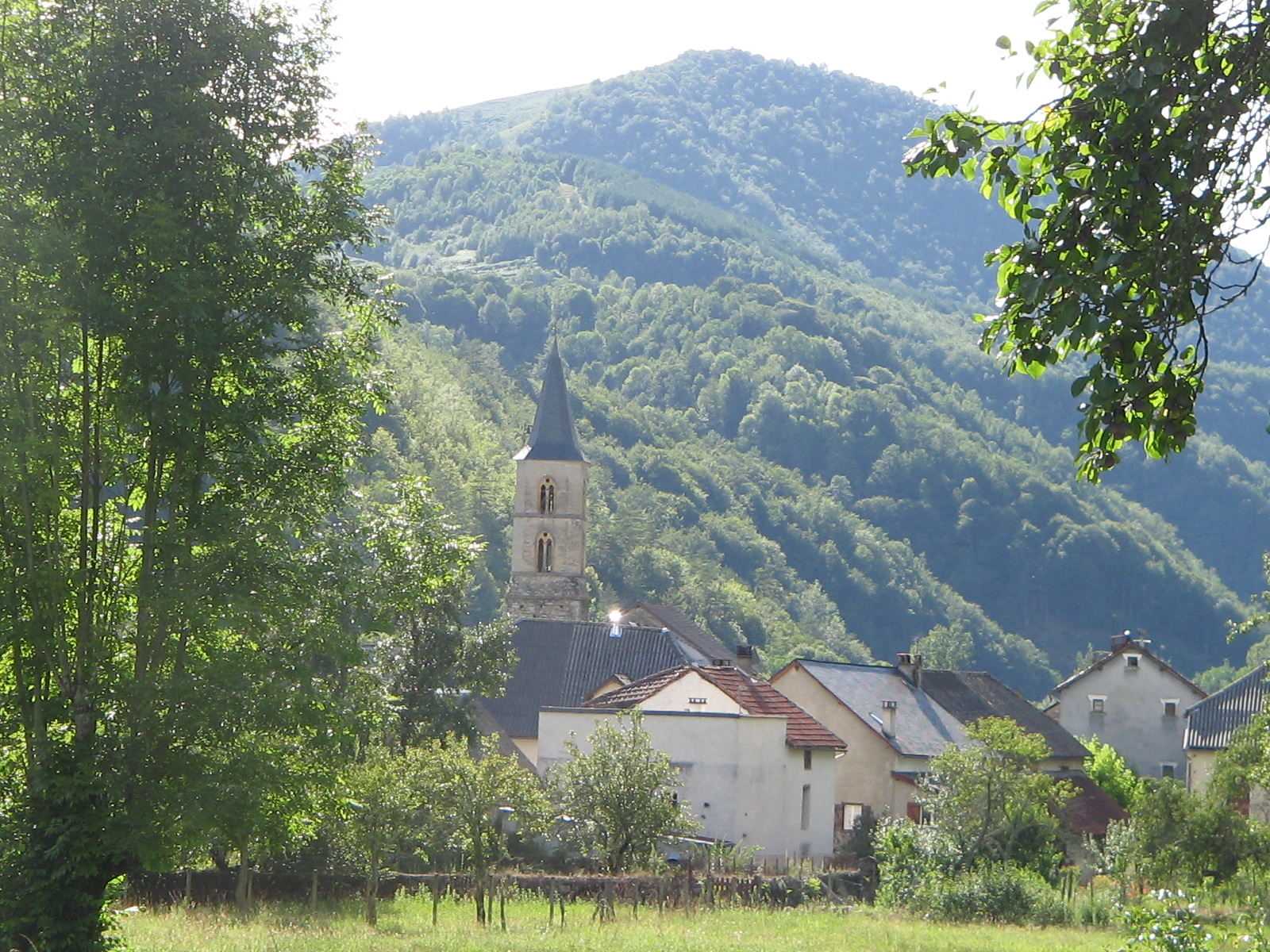
- A general view of Biert

- Coat of arms
- Location of Biert
- Location within France Location within Occitanie
- Coordinates: 42°53′59″N 1°18′59″E
- Country: France
- Region: Occitania
- Department: Ariège
- Arrondissement: Saint-Girons
- Canton: Couserans Est
- Intercommunality: Couserans-Pyrénées

Government
  - Mayor (2020–2026): Gilbert Lazaroo
- Area^{1}: 23.51 km^{2} (9.08 sq mi)
- Elevation: 588 m (1,929 ft)
- Highest elevation: 1,371 m (4,498 ft)
- Lowest elevation: 559 m (1,834 ft)
- Population (2023): 303
  - Density: 12.9/km^{2} (33.4/sq mi)
- Time zone: UTC+01:00 (CET)
  - Summer (DST): UTC+02:00 (CEST)
- INSEE/Postal code: 09057 /09320
- ^{1} French Land Register data, which excludes lakes, ponds, glaciers > 1 km^{2} (0.386 sq mi or 247 acres) and river estuaries.

Biert (French pronunciation: [bjɛʁt]; Occitan: Bièrt) is a commune in the Ariège department of southwestern France.

== Population ==
Historical population
Year	Pop.	±% p.a.
1968	334	—
1975	264	−3.30%
1982	243	−1.18%
1990	286	+2.06%
1999	284	−0.08%
2007	293	+0.39%
2012	305	+0.81%
2017	316	+0.71%
2023	303	−0.70%
Source: INSEE

Inhabitants of Biert are called Biertois in French.

== See also ==
- Communes of the Ariège department
