= Castelnau-Durban =

Commune in Occitanie, France

- Commune
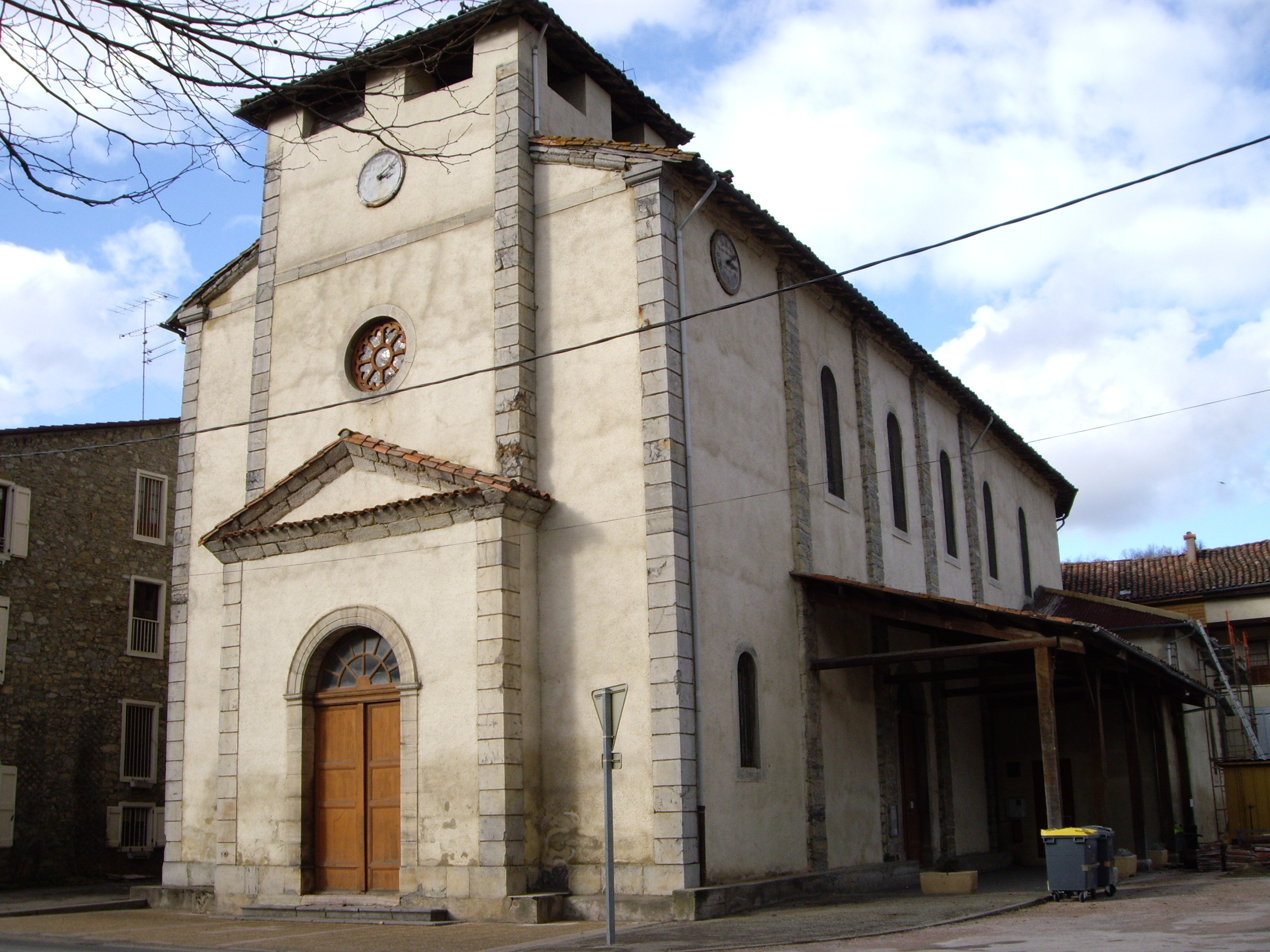
- The church in Castelnau-Durban
- Location of Castelnau-Durban
- Location within France Location within Occitanie
- Coordinates: 43°00′07″N 1°20′33″E
- Country: France
- Region: Occitania
- Department: Ariège
- Arrondissement: Saint-Girons
- Canton: Couserans Est

Government
  - Mayor (2020–2026): Marie-Pierre Eychenne
- Area^{1}: 13.18 km^{2} (5.09 sq mi)
- Elevation: 410 m (1,350 ft)
- Highest elevation: 931 m (3,054 ft)
- Lowest elevation: 361 m (1,184 ft)
- Population (2023): 458
  - Density: 34.7/km^{2} (90.0/sq mi)
- Time zone: UTC+01:00 (CET)
  - Summer (DST): UTC+02:00 (CEST)
- INSEE/Postal code: 09082 /09420
- ^{1} French Land Register data, which excludes lakes, ponds, glaciers > 1 km^{2} (0.386 sq mi or 247 acres) and river estuaries.

Castelnau-Durban (French pronunciation: [kastɛlno dyʁbɑ̃]; Occitan: Castèthnau de Durban) is a commune in the Ariège department in southwestern France.

== Population ==
Historical population
Year	Pop.	±% p.a.
1968	550	—
1975	522	−0.74%
1982	479	−1.22%
1990	437	−1.14%
1999	423	−0.36%
2007	415	−0.24%
2012	438	+1.08%
2017	449	+0.50%
2023	458	+0.33%
Source: INSEE

== See also ==
- Communes of the Ariège department
