= Montels, Ariège =

Commune in Occitanie, France

Montels
- Commune
- Location of Montels
- Location within France Location within Occitanie
- Coordinates: 43°00′21″N 1°28′25″E
- Country: France
- Region: Occitania
- Department: Ariège
- Arrondissement: Saint-Girons
- Canton: Couserans Est

Government
  - Mayor (2021–2026): Thierry Respaud
- Area^{1}: 3.73 km^{2} (1.44 sq mi)
- Elevation: 430 m (1,410 ft)
- Highest elevation: 544 m (1,785 ft)
- Lowest elevation: 413 m (1,355 ft)
- Population (2023): 164
  - Density: 44.0/km^{2} (114/sq mi)
- Time zone: UTC+01:00 (CET)
  - Summer (DST): UTC+02:00 (CEST)
- INSEE/Postal code: 09203 /09240
- ^{1} French Land Register data, which excludes lakes, ponds, glaciers > 1 km^{2} (0.386 sq mi or 247 acres) and river estuaries.

Montels is a commune in the Ariège department in southwestern France.

== Population ==
Historical population
Year	Pop.	±% p.a.
1968	143	—
1975	110	−3.68%
1982	118	+1.01%
1990	126	+0.82%
1999	124	−0.18%
2007	151	+2.49%
2012	161	+1.29%
2017	158	−0.38%
2023	164	+0.62%
Source: INSEE

== See also ==
- Communes of the Ariège department
