= Suzan, France =

Commune in Occitanie, France

Suzan
- Commune
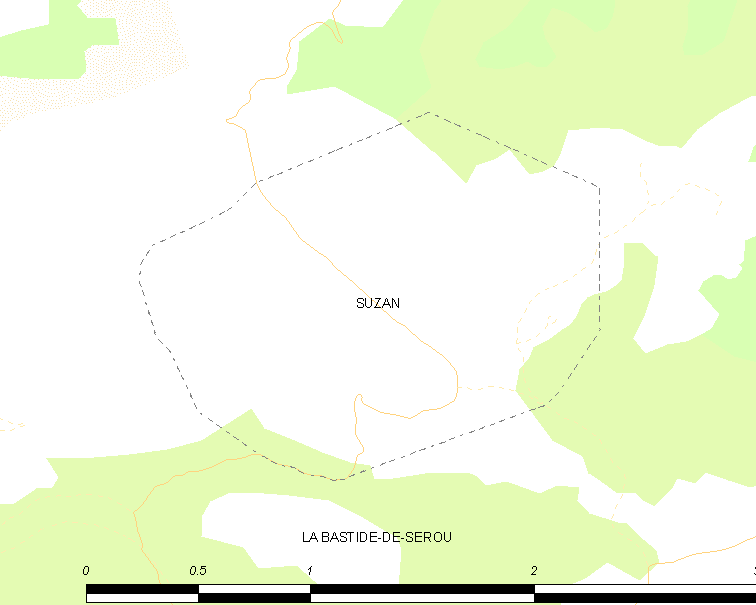
- Map commune
- Location of Suzan
- Location within France Location within Occitanie
- Coordinates: 43°02′07″N 1°26′34″E
- Country: France
- Region: Occitania
- Department: Ariège
- Arrondissement: Saint-Girons
- Canton: Couserans Est

Government
  - Mayor (2020–2026): Gabriel Fauré
- Area^{1}: 3.05 km^{2} (1.18 sq mi)
- Elevation: 590 m (1,940 ft)
- Highest elevation: 631 m (2,070 ft)
- Lowest elevation: 436 m (1,430 ft)
- Population (2023): 26
  - Density: 8.5/km^{2} (22/sq mi)
- Time zone: UTC+01:00 (CET)
  - Summer (DST): UTC+02:00 (CEST)
- INSEE/Postal code: 09304 /09240
- ^{1} French Land Register data, which excludes lakes, ponds, glaciers > 1 km^{2} (0.386 sq mi or 247 acres) and river estuaries.

Suzan (French pronunciation: [syzɑ̃]; Occitan: Susan) is a commune in the Ariège department in southwestern France.

== Population ==
Historical population
Year	Pop.	±% p.a.
1968	24	—
1975	23	−0.61%
1982	19	−2.69%
1990	17	−1.38%
1999	17	+0.00%
2007	22	+3.28%
2012	23	+0.89%
2017	16	−7.00%
2023	26	+8.43%
Source: INSEE

Inhabitants of Suzan are called Suzanois in French.

== See also ==
- Communes of the Ariège department
