= Cadarcet =

Commune in Occitanie, France

- Commune
- Location of Cadarcet
- Location within France Location within Occitanie
- Coordinates: 43°00′43″N 1°30′00″E
- Country: France
- Region: Occitania
- Department: Ariège
- Arrondissement: Saint-Girons
- Canton: Couserans Est

Government
  - Mayor (2020–2026): Michel Bouche
- Area^{1}: 11.01 km^{2} (4.25 sq mi)
- Elevation: 507 m (1,663 ft)
- Highest elevation: 917 m (3,009 ft)
- Lowest elevation: 386 m (1,266 ft)
- Population (2023): 211
  - Density: 19.2/km^{2} (49.6/sq mi)
- Time zone: UTC+01:00 (CET)
  - Summer (DST): UTC+02:00 (CEST)
- INSEE/Postal code: 09071 /09240
- ^{1} French Land Register data, which excludes lakes, ponds, glaciers > 1 km^{2} (0.386 sq mi or 247 acres) and river estuaries.

Cadarcet is a commune in the Ariège department in southwestern France.

== Population ==
Historical population
Year	Pop.	±% p.a.
1968	220	—
1975	197	−1.57%
1982	197	+0.00%
1990	167	−2.04%
1999	215	+2.85%
2007	227	+0.68%
2012	236	+0.78%
2017	224	−1.04%
2023	211	−0.99%
Source: INSEE

== See also ==
- Communes of the Ariège department
