= Allières =

Commune in Occitanie, France

- Commune
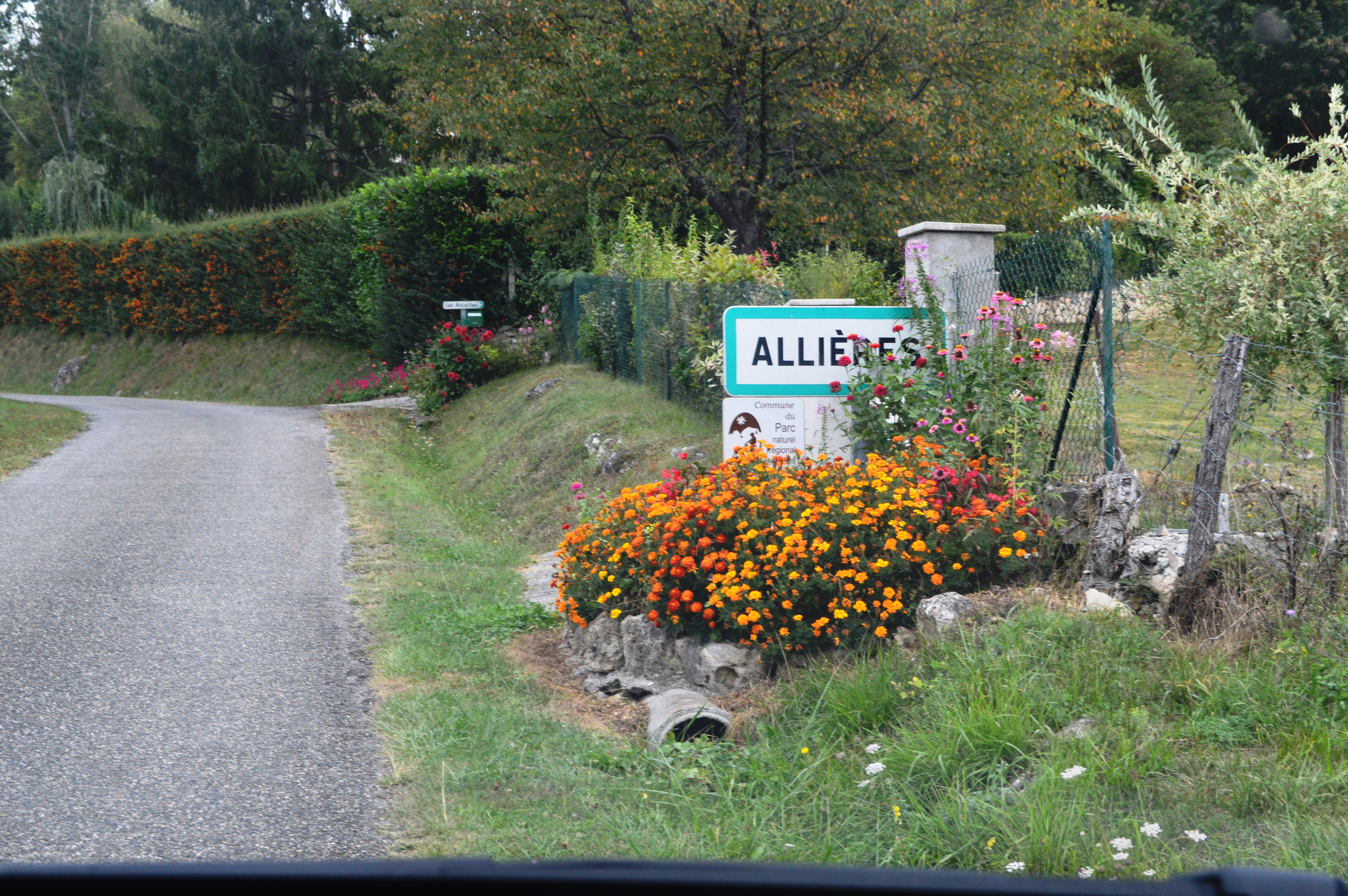
- The road into Allières
- Location of Allières
- Location within France Location within Occitanie
- Coordinates: 43°02′14″N 1°22′00″E
- Country: France
- Region: Occitania
- Department: Ariège
- Arrondissement: Saint-Girons
- Canton: Couserans Est
- Intercommunality: Couserans-Pyrénées

Government
  - Mayor (2020–2026): Denis Puech
- Area^{1}: 9.1 km^{2} (3.5 sq mi)
- Elevation: 550 m (1,800 ft)
- Highest elevation: 652 m (2,139 ft)
- Lowest elevation: 347 m (1,138 ft)
- Population (2023): 76
  - Density: 8.4/km^{2} (22/sq mi)
- Time zone: UTC+01:00 (CET)
  - Summer (DST): UTC+02:00 (CEST)
- INSEE/Postal code: 09007 /09240
- ^{1} French Land Register data, which excludes lakes, ponds, glaciers > 1 km^{2} (0.386 sq mi or 247 acres) and river estuaries.

Allières (French pronunciation: [aljɛʁ]; Occitan: Alhèras) is a commune in the Ariège department in the Occitanie region of southwestern France.

== Geography ==
Allières is located in the Plantaurel mountains in the Natural Regional Park of Pyrénées ariégeoises some 22 km west by north-west of Foix and some 70 km south of Toulouse. Access to the commune is by the minor D49 road which runs north from the D117 road through the commune and the village and continuing north across the mountains to join the D119 near Maury. There is also access by a minor road from the east. Apart from the village there is also the hamlet of Escougnale. The commune is heavily forested with a few farms.

Numerous streams rise in the commune mostly flowing north to the Ruisseau de Mourisse which forms the northern border of the commune and flows west to join the Arize river near Maury. There is also the Ruisseau de Peydalières rising in the west of the commune which flows west also to join the Arize.

== Administration ==
List of Successive Mayors

From	To	Name
2001	2026	Denis Puech

== Population ==
The inhabitants of the commune are known as Alliérasois or Alliérasoises in French.

Historical population
Year	Pop.	±% p.a.
1968	55	—
1975	45	−2.83%
1982	40	−1.67%
1990	57	+4.53%
1999	65	+1.47%
2007	65	+0.00%
2012	71	+1.78%
2017	71	+0.00%
2023	76	+1.14%
Source: INSEE

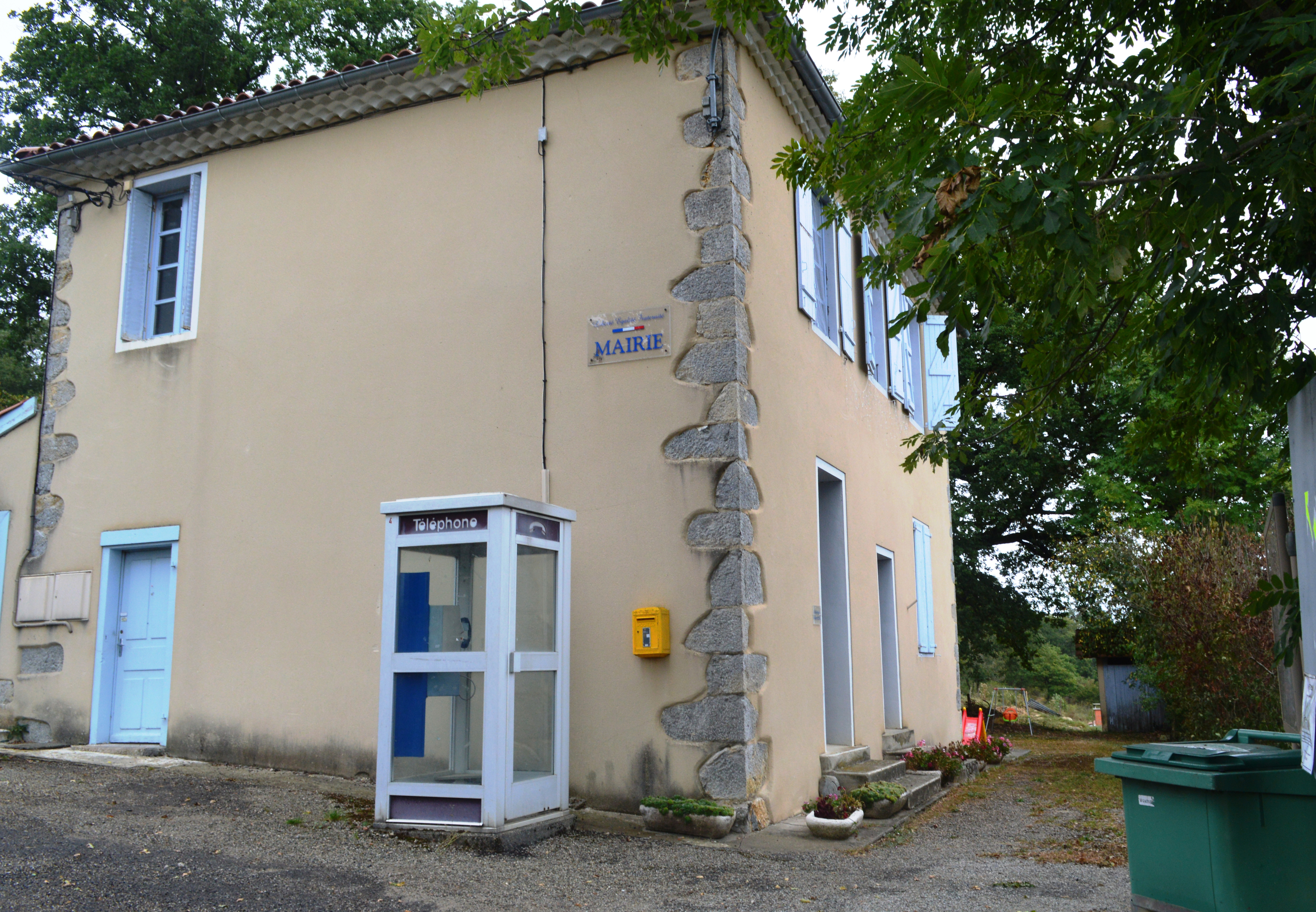
The Town Hall

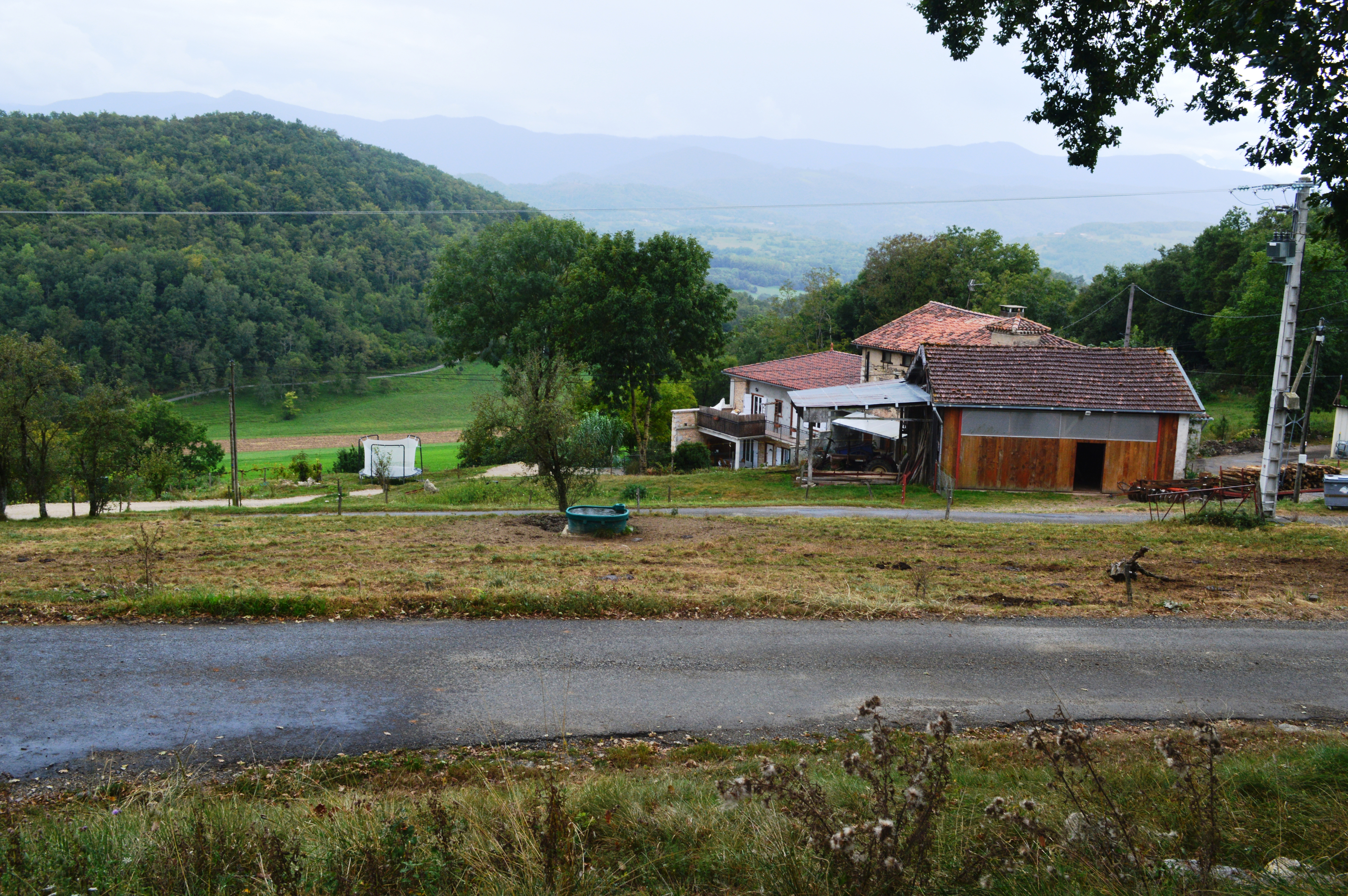
General View of Allières

== Culture and heritage ==
=== Religious heritage ===
The Parish Church of Saint Roche contains two items that are registered as historical objects:

- A Painting with frame: Presentation at the temple of the child Jesus with a saint bishop (17th century)
- A Painting with frame: Virgin and child surrounded by Saint Julien and Saint Nicolas de Myre (1871)

== Notable people linked to the commune ==
The Falentin Saintenac family has many dead in their chapel adjoining the church.

== See also ==
- Communes of the Ariège department
