= Mauvezin =

Mauvezin may refer to several communes in France:

- Mauvezin, Haute-Garonne
- Mauvezin, Gers
- Mauvezin, Hautes-Pyrénées
- Mauvezin-d'Armagnac, in the Landes department
- Mauvezin-de-Prat, in the Ariège department
- Mauvezin-de-Sainte-Croix, in the Ariège department
- Mauvezin-sur-Gupie, in the Lot-et-Garonne department
