= La Bastide-du-Salat =

Commune in Occitanie, France

- Commune
- Location of La Bastide-du-Salat
- Location within France Location within Occitanie
- Coordinates: 43°03′24″N 0°59′14″E
- Country: France
- Region: Occitania
- Department: Ariège
- Arrondissement: Saint-Girons
- Canton: Portes du Couserans
- Intercommunality: Couserans-Pyrénées

Government
  - Mayor (2020–2026): Véronique Rousseau
- Area^{1}: 6.6 km^{2} (2.5 sq mi)
- Elevation: 370 m (1,210 ft)
- Highest elevation: 464 m (1,522 ft)
- Lowest elevation: 295 m (968 ft)
- Population (2023): 203
  - Density: 31/km^{2} (80/sq mi)
- Time zone: UTC+01:00 (CET)
  - Summer (DST): UTC+02:00 (CEST)
- INSEE/Postal code: 09041 /09160
- ^{1} French Land Register data, which excludes lakes, ponds, glaciers > 1 km^{2} (0.386 sq mi or 247 acres) and river estuaries.

La Bastide-du-Salat (French pronunciation: [la bastid dy salat]; Occitan: Era Bastida deth Salat) is a commune in the Ariège department in the Occitanie region of south-western France.

== Geography ==
La Bastide-du-Salat is located some 22 km east by south-east of Saint-Gaudens and 12 km north-west of Saint-Girons. The northern and western borders of the commune are also the departmental border with Haute-Garonne. Access to the commune is by the D134 road from Lacave in the south. The D134A continues north from the village becoming the D83H at the departmental border and on to Touille. The D60F goes west from the village across the Salat to Castagnède. The western third of the commune is farmland while the rest is heavily forested.

The Salat river forms the entire western border of the commune as it flows north to join the Garonne at Roquefort-sur-Garonne. The Ruisseau de la Monge rises in the far east of the commune and flows north-east to join the Lavin west of Betchat.

== History ==
Founded in 1250 by Raymon-Athon, Lord of Prat, for two centuries it was called Bastida Raimondi-Athonis de Aspello.

La Bastide-du-Salat appears as la Baftide du Salat on the 1750 Cassini Map and la Basudo on the 1790 version.

== Administration ==
List of Successive Mayors

From	To	Name
2001	2014	Bernard Soum
2014	2020	Michèle Colin
2020	2026	Véronique Rousseau

== Demography ==
The inhabitants of the commune are known as Salatois or Salatoises in French.

Historical population

Year	Pop.	±% p.a.
1793	412	—
1821	459	+0.39%
1846	535	+0.61%
1872	407	−1.05%
1901	335	−0.67%
1921	294	−0.65%
1936	244	−1.24%
1946	209	−1.54%
1962	220	+0.32%

Year	Pop.	±% p.a.
1968	218	−0.15%
1975	180	−2.70%
1982	160	−1.67%
1990	147	−1.05%
1999	171	+1.69%
2007	193	+1.52%
2012	198	+0.51%
2017	182	−1.67%
2023	203	+1.84%

Source: EHESS and INSEE

== Culture and heritage ==
=== Religious heritage ===
The Parish Church of Notre-Dame-de-l'Assomption contains several items that are registered as historical objects:

- 6 Candlesticks (18th century)
- A Ciborium (19th century)
- A Statue: Christ on the Cross (16th century)
- A Painting: Christ in the Tomb (1842)

== Notable people linked to the commune ==
- André Cantenys, French filmmaker, born in La Bastide-du-Salat in 1920.

== See also ==
- Communes of the Ariège department
- Couserans
