= Bagert =

Commune in Occitanie, France

- Commune
- Location of Bagert
- Location within France Location within Occitanie
- Coordinates: 43°04′41″N 1°04′50″E
- Country: France
- Region: Occitania
- Department: Ariège
- Arrondissement: Saint-Girons
- Canton: Portes du Couserans
- Intercommunality: Couserans-Pyrénées

Government
  - Mayor (2020–2026): Angel Nunes
- Area^{1}: 3.28 km^{2} (1.27 sq mi)
- Elevation: 500 m (1,600 ft)
- Highest elevation: 563 m (1,847 ft)
- Lowest elevation: 340 m (1,120 ft)
- Population (2023): 46
  - Density: 14/km^{2} (36/sq mi)
- Time zone: UTC+01:00 (CET)
  - Summer (DST): UTC+02:00 (CEST)
- INSEE/Postal code: 09033 /09230
- ^{1} French Land Register data, which excludes lakes, ponds, glaciers > 1 km^{2} (0.386 sq mi or 247 acres) and river estuaries.

Bagert (French pronunciation: [baʒɛʁ]) is a commune in the department of Ariège in the Occitanie region of south-western France.

== Geography ==
The commune is situated in the former province of Volvestre some 16 km (9.9 mi) north-west of Saint-Girons and 6 km north of Mercenac. Access to the commune is by the D335 road which branches off the D35 east of Betchat and passes through the heart of the commune then continues south-east to join the D3. The commune is predominantly forest with some farmland.

The Ruisseau de Sournet forms the northern border of the commune as it flows west then north to join the Lens. The Ruisseau de Belloc forms part of the south-eastern border of the commune then flows north-west through the south of the commune to eventually join the Lens.

== Administration ==
List of Successive Mayors

From	To	Name
2001	2008	Alain Talarmin
2008	2014	André Marsan
2014	2020	Jean-Claude Dubois
2020	2026	Angel Nunes

== Demography ==
The inhabitants of the commune are known as Bagertois or Bagertoises in French.

Historical population

Year	Pop.	±% p.a.
1793	233	—
1821	209	−0.39%
1846	321	+1.73%
1872	266	−0.72%
1901	202	−0.94%
1926	161	−0.90%
1946	112	−1.80%
1962	92	−1.22%
1968	65	−5.63%

Year	Pop.	±% p.a.
1975	59	−1.37%
1982	56	−0.74%
1990	45	−2.70%
1999	54	+2.05%
2007	58	+0.90%
2012	49	−3.32%
2017	38	−4.96%
2023	46	+3.24%

Source: EHESS and INSEE

== See also ==
- Communes of the Ariège department
