= Barjac =

Barjac is the name of several communes in France:

- Barjac, Ariège, in the Ariège department
- Barjac, Gard, in the Gard department
- Barjac, Lozère, in the Lozère department
