= Castagnède =

Castagnède is the name of the following communes in France:

- Castagnède, Haute-Garonne, in the Haute-Garonne department
- Castagnède, Pyrénées-Atlantiques, in the Pyrénées-Atlantiques department
