= Bédeille =

Bédeille is the name of the following communes in France:

- Bédeille, Ariège, in the Ariège department
- Bédeille, Pyrénées-Atlantiques, in the Pyrénées-Atlantiques department
