= Lacave =

Lacave is the name of 2 communes in France:

- Lacave, Ariège, in the Ariège department
- Lacave, Lot, in the Lot department
