= Basile Sauné =

French flying ace

Basile Félicien Sauné
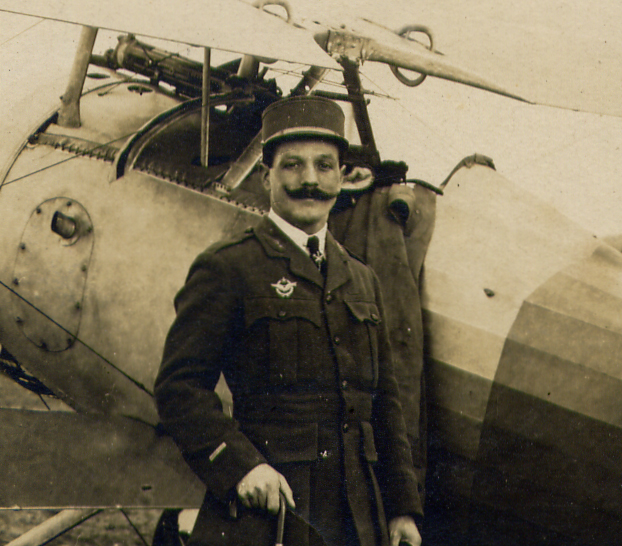
- asile Félicien Sauné
- Born: 1 January 1887; La Bastide-du-Salat, France
- Died: 20 June 1918 (aged 31)
- Military career
- Allegiance: France
- Branch: Aviation
- Rank: Sous lieutenant
- Units: Escadrille MF.85; Escadrille N.531
- Awards: Croix de Guerre; Unspecified Serbian and Greek awards

Sous lieutenant Basile Félicien Sauné was a French World War I flying ace credited with five aerial victories.

== Biography ==
See also Aerial victory standards of World War I

Basile Félicien Sauné was born in La Bastide-du-Salat, France on 1 January 1887.

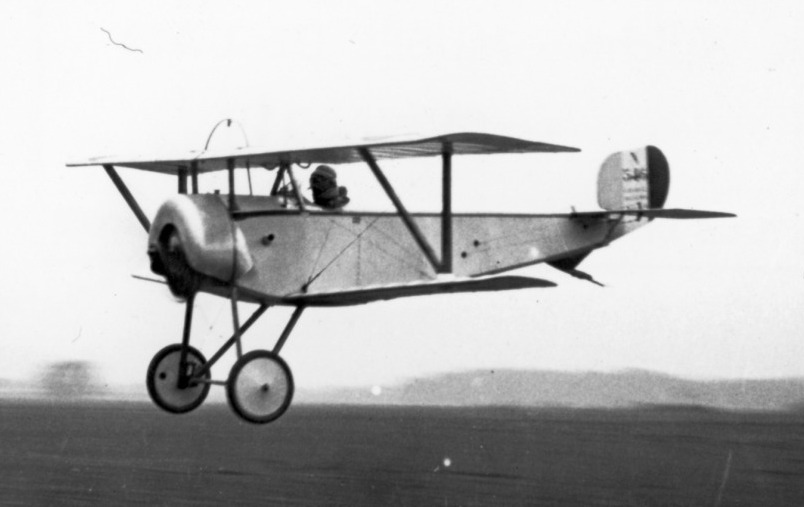
The Nieuport 11 was the weapon Basile Sauné used to shoot down five enemy airplanes.

In 1917, he served his mandatory military service as an infantryman and was released to the reserves. On 2 August 1914, he was recalled for World War I. After serving over a year's trench duty, he transferred to aviation. He received his Military Pilot's Brevet on 21 August 1916 when he graduated primary training. After advanced training, he was shipped off to l'Armee Orient. He scored no victories with Escadrille MF.85, but once transferred to Escadrille 531 to fly a Nieuport 11 "Bebe", he shot down five enemy airplanes between 30 April and 13 June 1918 to become an ace.

Basile Félicien Sauné was killed in action in a dogfight with several enemy airplanes a week after his last victory, on 20 June 1918.

For his valor, he had been granted Serbian and Greek awards, in addition to his native France's Croix de Guerre.

== Early life and military service ==
Before World War I, Sauné worked as a civilian, but his military career became notable during the war when he joined the French Air Service as a pilot. He eventually rose to the rank of Sous-Lieutenant, serving as a fighter pilot during a critical phase of the conflict. After receiving his pilot's brevet on 31 August 1916, he underwent further flight and weapons training before deployment.

Sauné was assigned to Escadrille MF.85 on the Army of the Orient and later to Escadrille N.531, where he flew a Nieuport fighter. He achieved five confirmed aerial victories between 30 April and 13 June 1918, earning his status as a flying ace.

Promoted to Sous‑Lieutenant, he continued flying combat missions until he was killed in action on 20 June 1918.
