= Fabas =

Fabas is the name of several communes in France:

- Fabas, Ariège, in the Ariège department
- Fabas, Haute-Garonne, in the Haute-Garonne department
- Fabas, Tarn-et-Garonne, in the Tarn-et-Garonne department
