= Bethmale =

Commune in Occitanie, France

- Commune
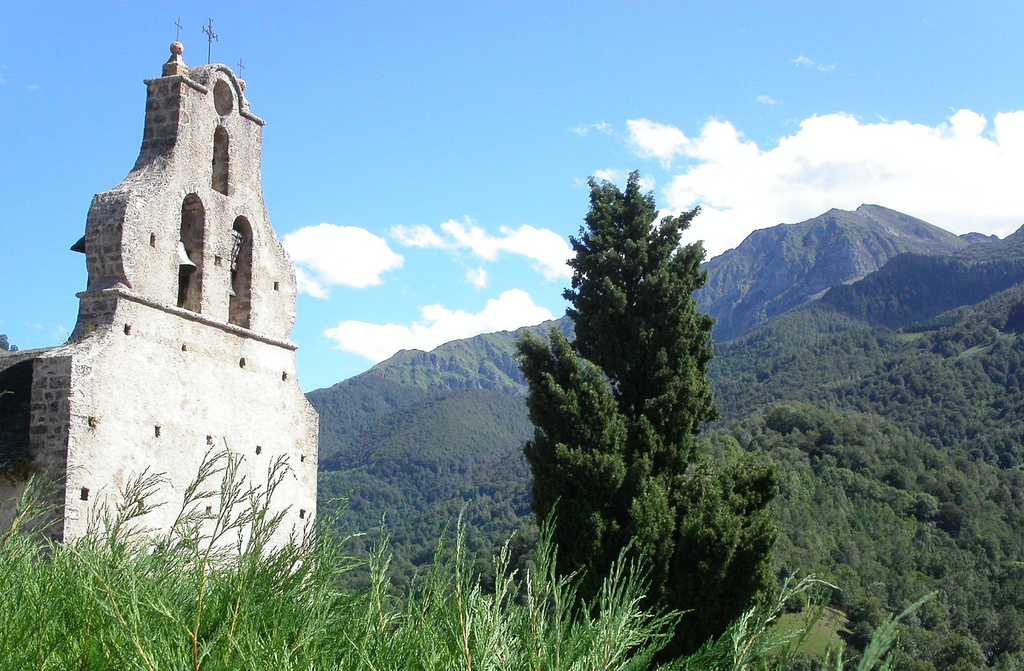
- The church in Bethmale
- Location of Bethmale
- Location within France Location within Occitanie
- Coordinates: 42°53′24″N 1°03′29″E
- Country: France
- Region: Occitania
- Department: Ariège
- Arrondissement: Saint-Girons
- Canton: Couserans Ouest

Government
  - Mayor (2020–2026): Sylvie Domenc
- Area^{1}: 31.61 km^{2} (12.20 sq mi)
- Elevation: 750 m (2,460 ft)
- Highest elevation: 2,838 m (9,311 ft)
- Lowest elevation: 638 m (2,093 ft)
- Population (2023): 108
  - Density: 3.42/km^{2} (8.85/sq mi)
- Time zone: UTC+01:00 (CET)
  - Summer (DST): UTC+02:00 (CEST)
- INSEE/Postal code: 09055 /09800
- ^{1} French Land Register data, which excludes lakes, ponds, glaciers > 1 km^{2} (0.386 sq mi or 247 acres) and river estuaries.

Bethmale (French pronunciation: [bɛtmal]; Occitan: Vathmala) is a commune in the Ariège department of southwestern France.

== Name ==
The name is of Gascon origin: "Beth" (beautiful) and "Malh" (mountain, mountain side).

== Organization ==
The valley contains six villages in two communes:

Commune de Bethmale

- Ayet
- Samortein

Commune d'Arrien-en-Bethmale

- Aret
- Arrien
- Tournac
- Villargein

Located in the former province of Couserans, it is well known for its local culture, and for a cheese they produce, a semi-hard cow's milk cheese traditionally made from raw milk.

== History ==
The valley is characterized by a strong sense of local identity, expressed in the traditional costumes of the area, which includes the famous Bethmale clogs.

== Population ==
Historical population
Year	Pop.	±% p.a.
1968	187	—
1975	149	−3.19%
1982	96	−6.09%
1990	96	+0.00%
1999	83	−1.60%
2007	95	+1.70%
2012	98	+0.62%
2017	95	−0.62%
2023	108	+2.16%
Source: INSEE

Inhabitants of Bethmale are called Bethmalais in French.

== See also ==
- Communes of the Ariège department
