= Arrien-en-Bethmale =

Commune in Occitanie, France

- Commune
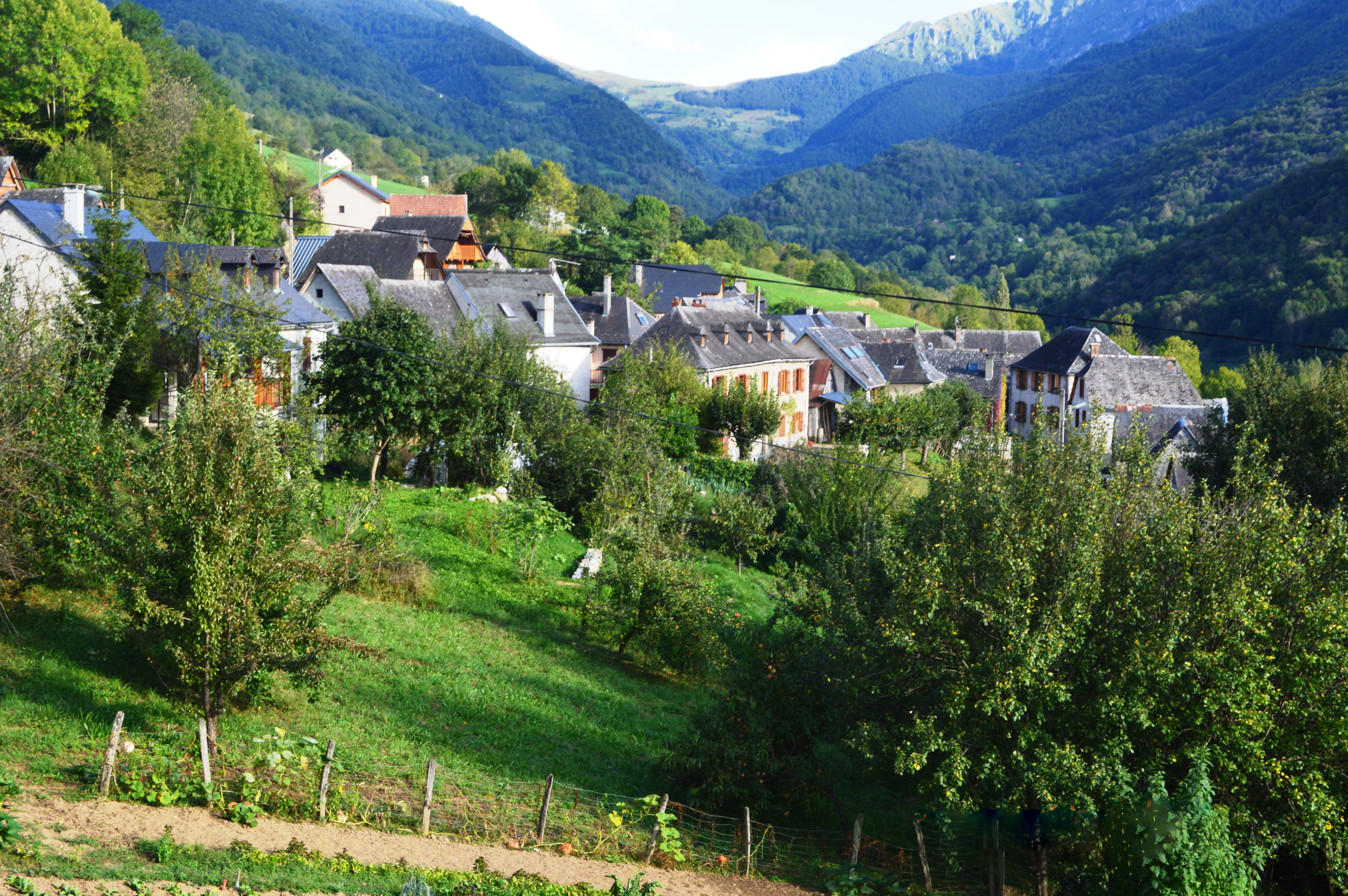
- A general view of Arrien-en-Bethmale
- Location of Arrien-en-Bethmale
- Location within France Location within Occitanie
- Coordinates: 42°53′51″N 1°02′32″E
- Country: France
- Region: Occitania
- Department: Ariège
- Arrondissement: Saint-Girons
- Canton: Couserans Ouest
- Intercommunality: CC Couserans - Pyrénées

Government
  - Mayor (2020–2026): Jean-Pierre Gaston
- Area^{1}: 14.59 km^{2} (5.63 sq mi)
- Elevation: 620 m (2,030 ft)
- Highest elevation: 2,085 m (6,841 ft)
- Lowest elevation: 598 m (1,962 ft)
- Population (2023): 134
  - Density: 9.18/km^{2} (23.8/sq mi)
- Time zone: UTC+01:00 (CET)
  - Summer (DST): UTC+02:00 (CEST)
- INSEE/Postal code: 09017 /09800
- ^{1} French Land Register data, which excludes lakes, ponds, glaciers > 1 km^{2} (0.386 sq mi or 247 acres) and river estuaries.

Arrien-en-Bethmale (French pronunciation: [aʁjɛ̃ ɑ̃ bɛtmal]; Occitan: Arrienh de Vathmala) is a commune in the Ariège department in the Occitanie region of south-western France.

== Geography ==
Arrien-en-Bethmale consists of the villages of Aret, Arrian, Tournac, and Villargein, all located in the Pyrenees mountains in the Bethmale valley in the former province of Couserans some 12 km south-west of Saint-Girons and 3 km south of Castillon-en-Couserans. It is part of the Regional Natural Park of Pyrenees Ariège. Access to the commune is by the D17 road from Les Bordes-sur-Lez in the north-west passing through the commune and the village and continuing south-east to Bethmale. The commune is a rugged alpine commune heavily forested in many parts.

The Ruisseau de Cournelliere and the De Leaude rise north-east of the village and flow down to the south-west to join the Balamet river which flows down the valley to join the Lez north-west of the commune just south of Les Bordes-sur-Lez. The Ruisseau de Mourtis flows through the south of the commune also into the Lez.

== History ==
The commune was created in 1931 when it separated from the commune of Bethmale.

Arrien-en-Bethmale has a very ancient history, as evidenced by the discovery of a funerary inscription dating probably from the 1st century.

== Administration ==
List of Successive Mayors

From	To	Name
2001	2008	Robert Soubie
2008	2020	Gérard Pons
2020	2026	Jean-Pierre Gaston

== Demography ==
The inhabitants of the commune are known as Arrienois or Arrienoises in French.

Historical population

Year	Pop.	±% p.a.
1931	551	—
1936	430	−4.84%
1946	358	−1.82%
1954	273	−3.33%
1962	242	−1.50%
1968	186	−4.29%
1975	143	−3.69%

Year	Pop.	±% p.a.
1982	89	−6.55%
1990	89	+0.00%
1999	110	+2.38%
2007	102	−0.94%
2012	106	+0.77%
2017	111	+0.93%
2023	134	+3.19%

Source: EHESS and INSEE

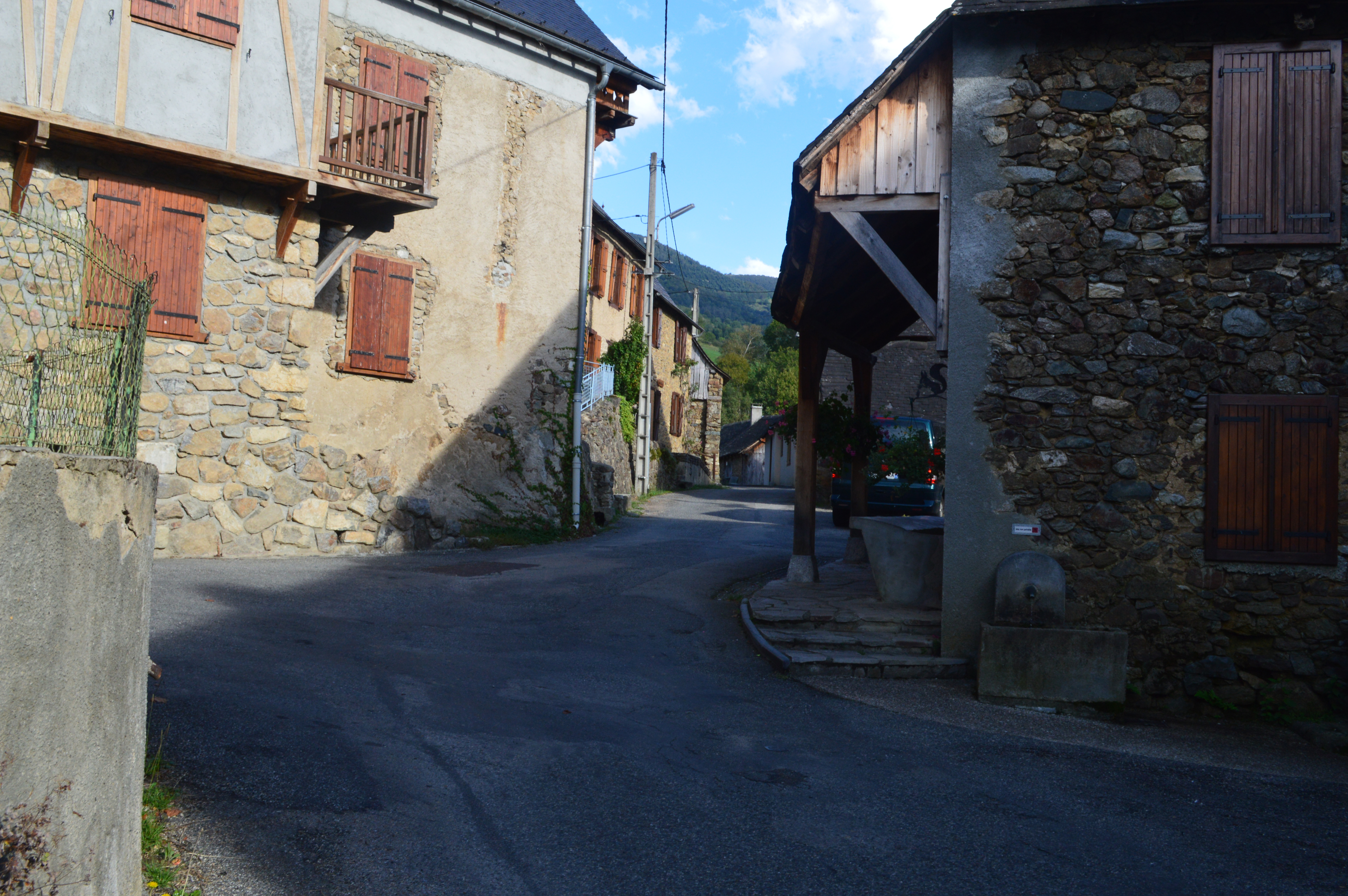
A Street in Arrien-en-Bethmale

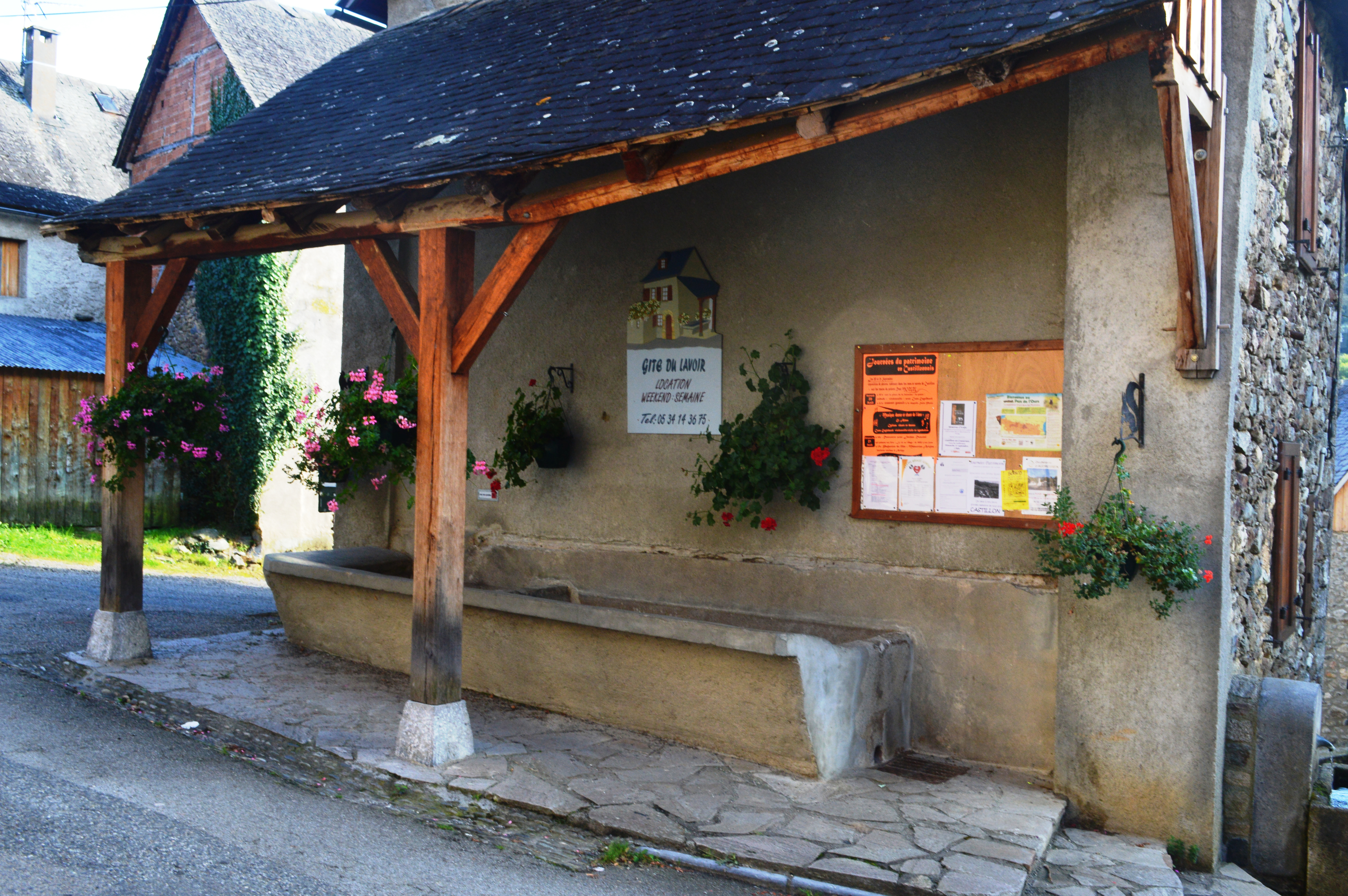
The Lavoir (Public Laundry)

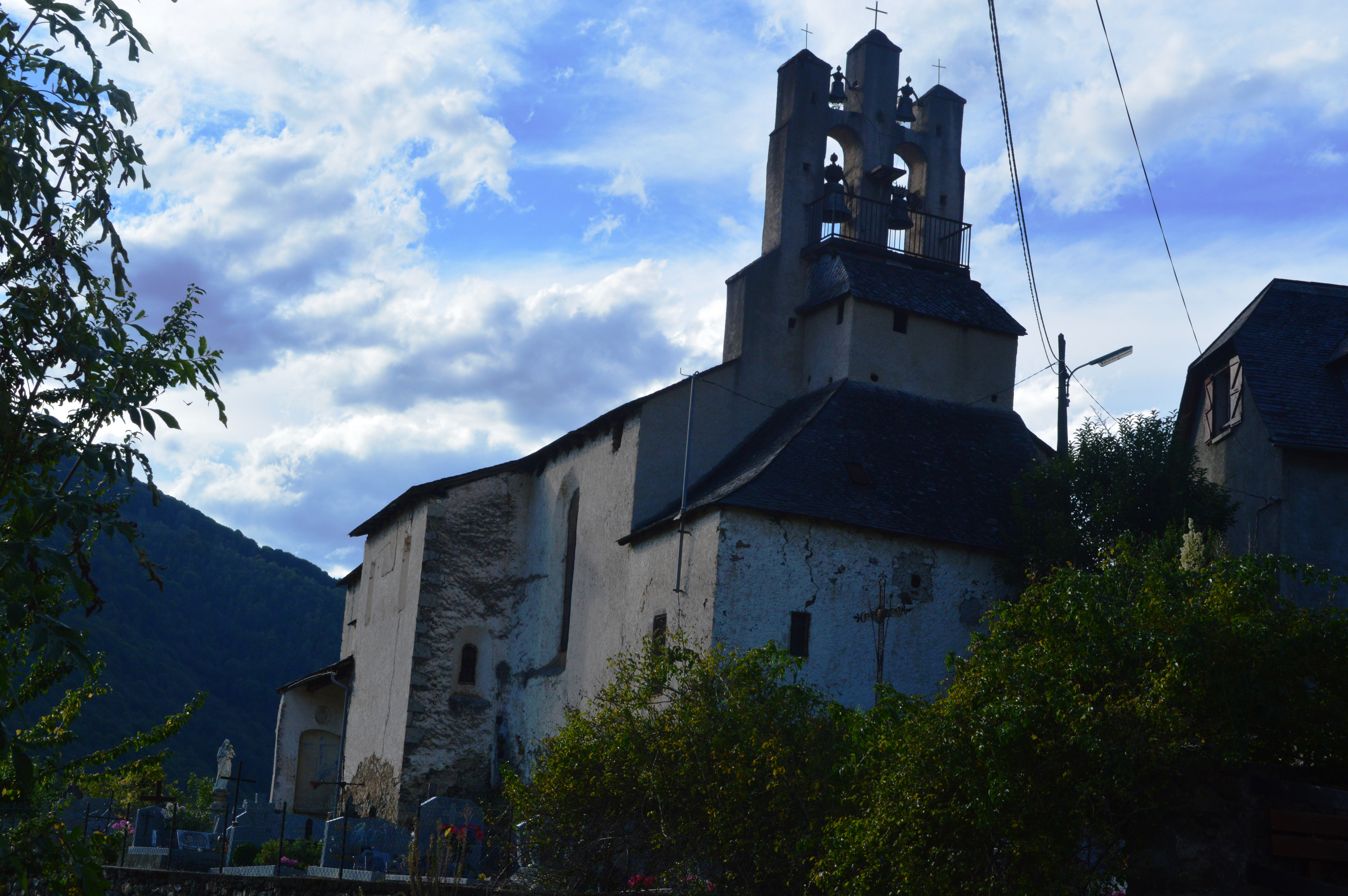
The Church

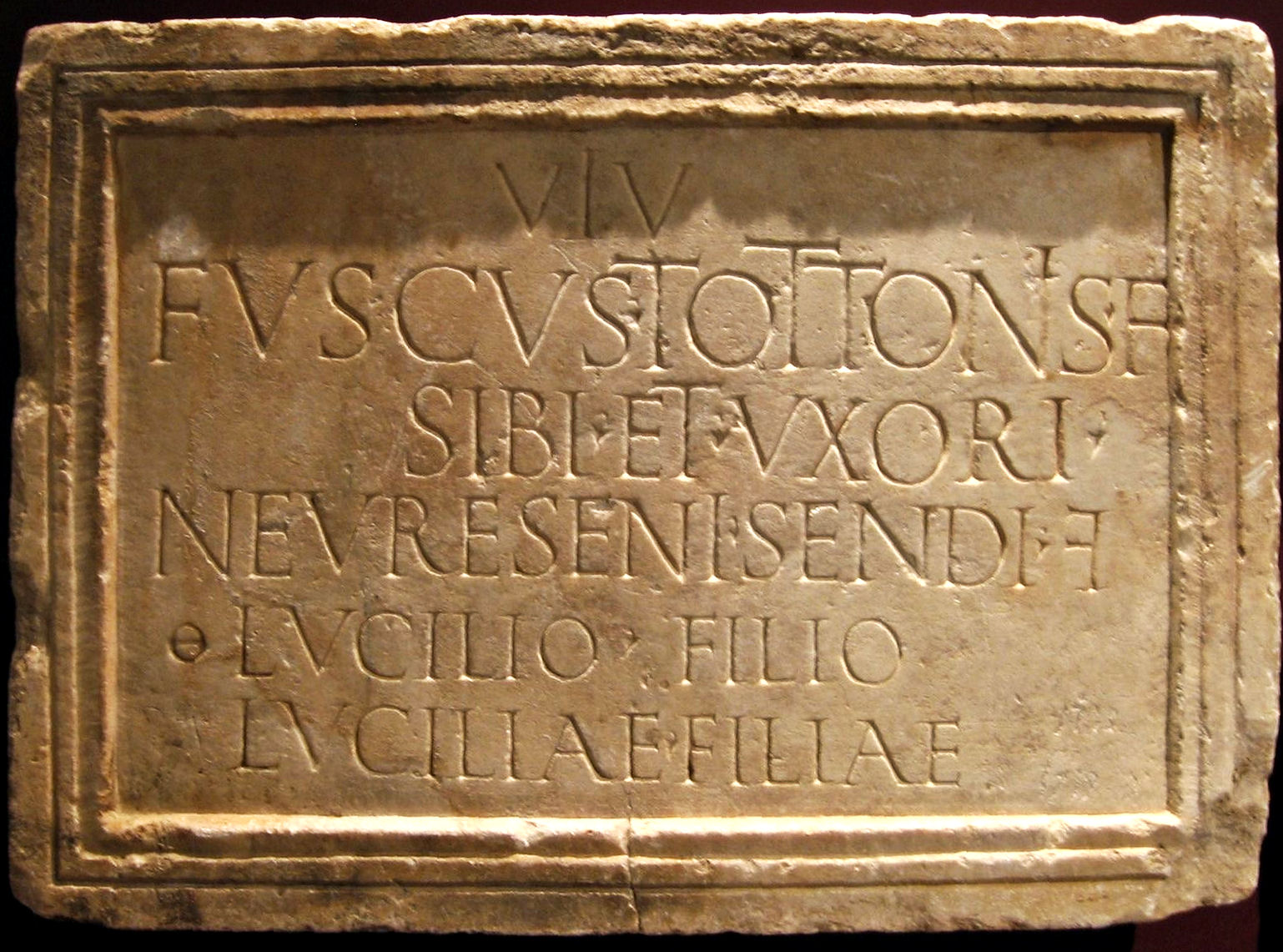
Funerary inscription of Fuscus (1st century) found in Arrien-en-Bethmale

== Culture and heritage ==
=== Religious heritage ===
The Church contains several items that are registered as historical objects:

- An Altar, Retable, Tabernacle, 3 Statues, and a Painting (18th century)
- 2 Candlesticks (18th century)
- An Altar, Retable, Tabernacle, 2 Paintings, and 2 Bas-Reliefs (18th century)
- An Altar, Retable, Tabernacle, 3 Statues, and a Painting (18th century)

== Notable people linked to the commune ==
- Roman Caramalli as monk for the Parish from 1999 to 2005 contributed to the recognition of the commune by promoting local culture.

== See also ==
- Communes of the Ariège department
