= Cérizols =

Commune in Occitanie, France

- Commune
- Location of Cérizols
- Location within France Location within Occitanie
- Coordinates: 43°07′47″N 1°03′43″E
- Country: France
- Region: Occitania
- Department: Ariège
- Arrondissement: Saint-Girons
- Canton: Portes du Couserans

Government
  - Mayor (2020–2026): Marie-Léone Blain
- Area^{1}: 14.34 km^{2} (5.54 sq mi)
- Elevation: 360 m (1,180 ft)
- Highest elevation: 587 m (1,926 ft)
- Lowest elevation: 309 m (1,014 ft)
- Population (2023): 138
  - Density: 9.62/km^{2} (24.9/sq mi)
- Time zone: UTC+01:00 (CET)
  - Summer (DST): UTC+02:00 (CEST)
- INSEE/Postal code: 09094 /09230
- ^{1} French Land Register data, which excludes lakes, ponds, glaciers > 1 km^{2} (0.386 sq mi or 247 acres) and river estuaries.

Cérizols is a commune in the Ariège department in southwestern France.

== Population ==
Historical population
Year	Pop.	±% p.a.
1968	190	—
1975	175	−1.17%
1982	156	−1.63%
1990	145	−0.91%
1999	138	−0.55%
2007	153	+1.30%
2012	156	+0.39%
2017	142	−1.86%
2023	138	−0.48%
Source: INSEE

== See also ==
- Communes of the Ariège department
