= Arrondissement of Saint-Girons =

Coordinates: 42.98°N 1.15°E

Saint-Girons
- Arrondissement
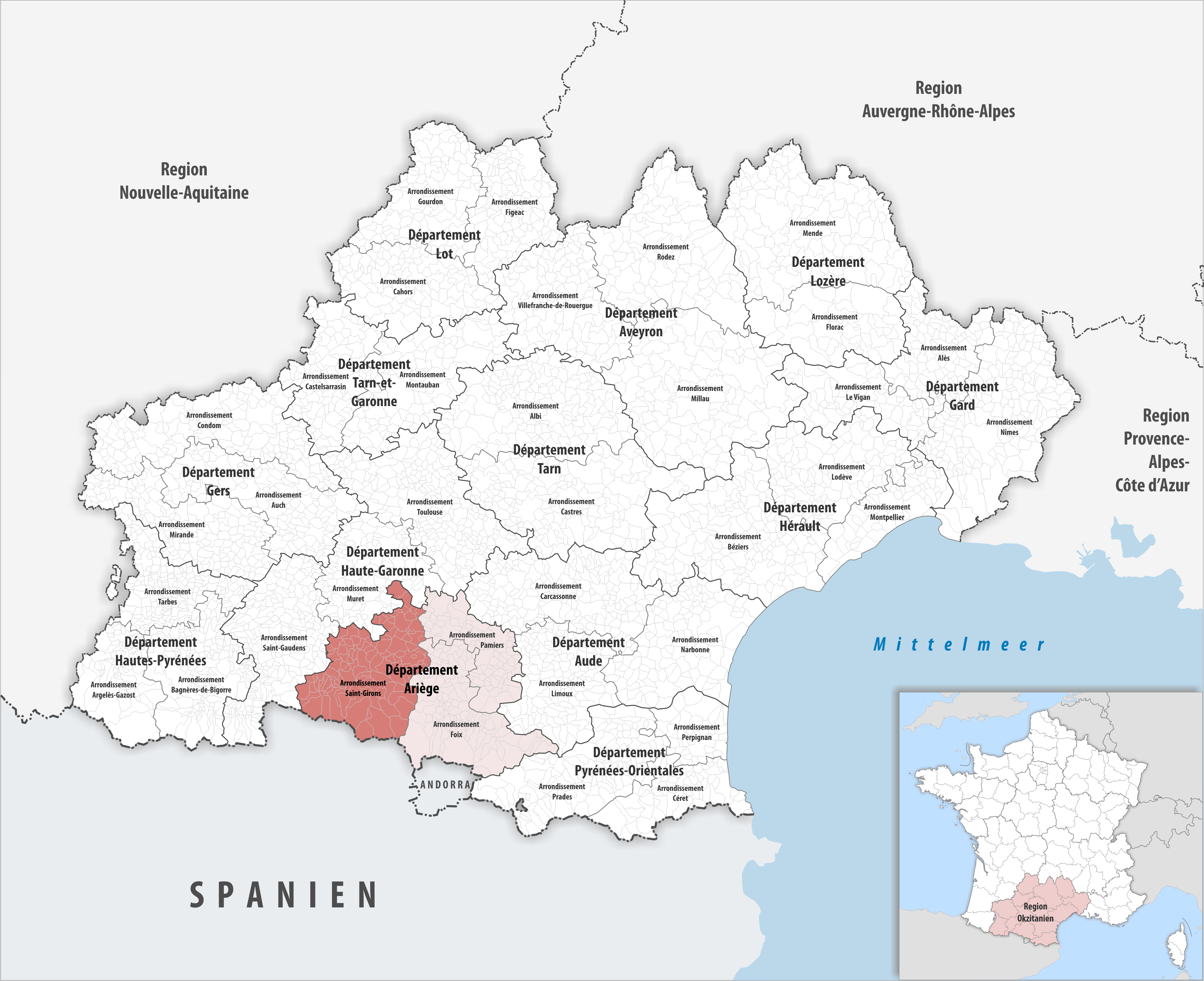
- Location within the region Occitanie
- Country: France
- Region: Occitania
- Department: Ariège
- No. of communes: {{{nbcomm}}}
- Area: 2,019.3 km^{2} (779.7 sq mi)
- Population (2023): 41,146
  - Density: 20.376/km^{2} (52.775/sq mi)
- INSEE code: 093

The arrondissement of Saint-Girons is an arrondissement of France in the Ariège department in the Occitanie region. It has 121 communes. Its population is 41,017 (2021), and its area is 2,019.3 km^{2} (779.7 sq mi).

== Composition ==
The communes of the arrondissement of Saint-Girons, and their INSEE codes, are:

1. Aigues-Juntes (09001)
2. Aleu (09005)
3. Allières (09007)
4. Alos (09008)
5. Alzen (09009)
6. Antras (09011)
7. Argein (09014)
8. Arrien-en-Bethmale (09017)
9. Arrout (09018)
10. Artigat (09019)
11. Aucazein (09025)
12. Audressein (09026)
13. Augirein (09027)
14. Aulus-les-Bains (09029)
15. Bagert (09033)
16. Balacet (09034)
17. Balaguères (09035)
18. Barjac (09037)
19. La Bastide-de-Besplas (09038)
20. La Bastide-du-Salat (09041)
21. La Bastide-de-Sérou (09042)
22. Bédeille (09046)
23. Betchat (09054)
24. Bethmale (09055)
25. Biert (09057)
26. Bonac-Irazein (09059)
27. Les Bordes-sur-Arize (09061)
28. Bordes-Uchentein (09062)
29. Boussenac (09065)
30. Buzan (09069)
31. Cadarcet (09071)
32. Camarade (09073)
33. Campagne-sur-Arize (09075)
34. Carla-Bayle (09079)
35. Castelnau-Durban (09082)
36. Castéras (09083)
37. Castex (09084)
38. Castillon-en-Couserans (09085)
39. Caumont (09086)
40. Cazavet (09091)
41. Cérizols (09094)
42. Cescau (09095)
43. Clermont (09097)
44. Contrazy (09098)
45. Couflens (09100)
46. Daumazan-sur-Arize (09105)
47. Durban-sur-Arize (09108)
48. Durfort (09109)
49. Encourtiech (09110)
50. Engomer (09111)
51. Ercé (09113)
52. Erp (09114)
53. Esplas-de-Sérou (09118)
54. Eycheil (09119)
55. Fabas (09120)
56. Fornex (09123)
57. Le Fossat (09124)
58. Gabre (09127)
59. Gajan (09128)
60. Galey (09129)
61. Illartein (09141)
62. Lacave (09148)
63. Lacourt (09149)
64. Lanoux (09151)
65. Larbont (09154)
66. Lasserre (09158)
67. Lescure (09164)
68. Lézat-sur-Lèze (09167)
69. Lorp-Sentaraille (09289)
70. Loubaut (09172)
71. Le Mas-d'Azil (09181)
72. Massat (09182)
73. Mauvezin-de-Prat (09183)
74. Mauvezin-de-Sainte-Croix (09184)
75. Méras (09186)
76. Mercenac (09187)
77. Mérigon (09190)
78. Monesple (09195)
79. Montagagne (09196)
80. Montardit (09198)
81. Montégut-en-Couserans (09201)
82. Montels (09203)
83. Montesquieu-Avantès (09204)
84. Montfa (09205)
85. Montgauch (09208)
86. Montjoie-en-Couserans (09209)
87. Montseron (09212)
88. Moulis (09214)
89. Nescus (09216)
90. Orgibet (09219)
91. Oust (09223)
92. Pailhès (09224)
93. Le Port (09231)
94. Prat-Bonrepaux (09235)
95. Rimont (09246)
96. Rivèrenert (09247)
97. Sabarat (09253)
98. Sainte-Croix-Volvestre (09257)
99. Sainte-Suzanne (09342)
100. Saint-Girons (09261)
101. Saint-Jean-du-Castillonnais (09263)
102. Saint-Lary (09267)
103. Saint-Lizier (09268)
104. Saint-Ybars (09277)
105. Salsein (09279)
106. Seix (09285)
107. Sentein (09290)
108. Sentenac-d'Oust (09291)
109. Sentenac-de-Sérou (09292)
110. Sieuras (09294)
111. Sor (09297)
112. Soueix-Rogalle (09299)
113. Soulan (09301)
114. Suzan (09304)
115. Taurignan-Castet (09307)
116. Taurignan-Vieux (09308)
117. Thouars-sur-Arize (09310)
118. Tourtouse (09313)
119. Ustou (09322)
120. Villeneuve (09335)
121. Villeneuve-du-Latou (09338)

== History ==
The arrondissement of Saint-Girons was created in 1800. At the January 2017 reorganization of the arrondissements of Ariège, it gained 13 communes from the arrondissement of Foix and 27 communes from the arrondissement of Pamiers.

As a result of the reorganisation of the cantons of France which came into effect in 2015, the borders of the cantons are no longer related to the borders of the arrondissements. The cantons of the arrondissement of Saint-Girons were, as of January 2015:

1. Castillon-en-Couserans
2. Massat
3. Oust
4. Sainte-Croix-Volvestre
5. Saint-Girons
6. Saint-Lizier
