= Taurignan-Vieux =

Commune in Occitanie, France

- Commune
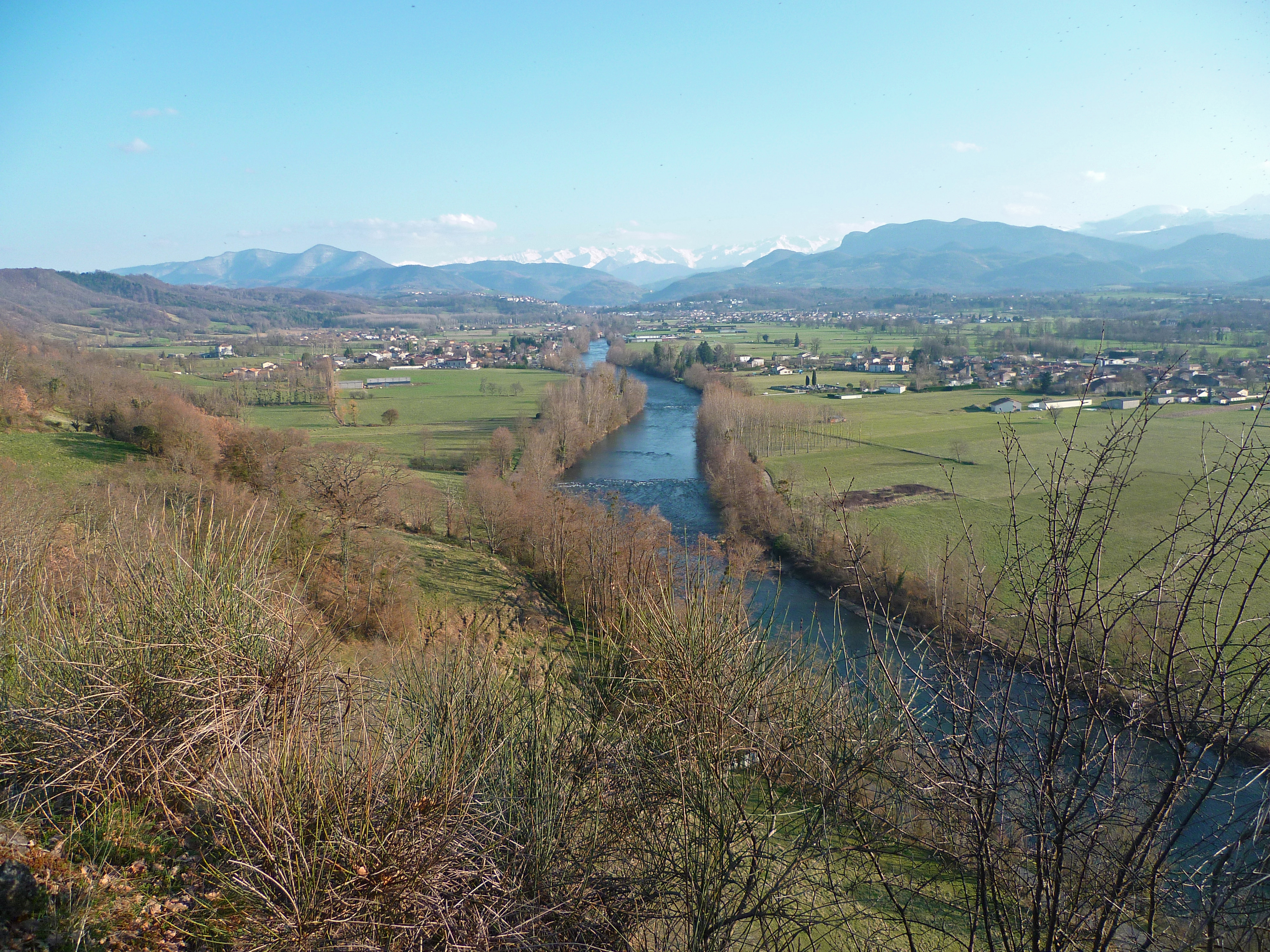
- The Rocher de Roquelaure in Taurignan-Vieux
- Location of Taurignan-Vieux
- Location within France Location within Occitanie
- Coordinates: 43°01′45″N 1°06′53″E
- Country: France
- Region: Occitania
- Department: Ariège
- Arrondissement: Saint-Girons
- Canton: Portes du Couserans

Government
  - Mayor (2020–2026): Magalie Bernère
- Area^{1}: 5.86 km^{2} (2.26 sq mi)
- Elevation: 364 m (1,194 ft)
- Highest elevation: 570 m (1,870 ft)
- Lowest elevation: 355 m (1,165 ft)
- Population (2023): 204
  - Density: 34.8/km^{2} (90.2/sq mi)
- Time zone: UTC+01:00 (CET)
  - Summer (DST): UTC+02:00 (CEST)
- INSEE/Postal code: 09308 /09190
- ^{1} French Land Register data, which excludes lakes, ponds, glaciers > 1 km^{2} (0.386 sq mi or 247 acres) and river estuaries.

Taurignan-Vieux (French pronunciation: [toʁiɲɑ̃ vjø]; Occitan: Taurinhan eth Vielh) is a commune in the Ariège department in southwestern France.

== Population ==
Inhabitants of Taurignan-Vieux are called Taurignanais in French.

Historical population
Year	Pop.	±% p.a.
1968	202	—
1975	183	−1.40%
1982	185	+0.16%
1990	190	+0.33%
1999	209	+1.06%
2007	214	+0.30%
2012	210	−0.38%
2017	206	−0.38%
2023	204	−0.16%
Source: INSEE

== See also ==
- Communes of the Ariège department
