= Contrazy =

Commune in Occitanie, France

- Commune
- Location of Contrazy
- Location within France Location within Occitanie
- Coordinates: 43°03′38″N 1°12′53″E
- Country: France
- Region: Occitania
- Department: Ariège
- Arrondissement: Saint-Girons
- Canton: Portes du Couserans

Government
  - Mayor (2020–2026): Christian Torrell
- Area^{1}: 8.27 km^{2} (3.19 sq mi)
- Elevation: 540 m (1,770 ft)
- Highest elevation: 693 m (2,274 ft)
- Lowest elevation: 387 m (1,270 ft)
- Population (2023): 76
  - Density: 9.2/km^{2} (24/sq mi)
- Time zone: UTC+01:00 (CET)
  - Summer (DST): UTC+02:00 (CEST)
- INSEE/Postal code: 09098 /09230
- ^{1} French Land Register data, which excludes lakes, ponds, glaciers > 1 km^{2} (0.386 sq mi or 247 acres) and river estuaries.

Contrazy (French pronunciation: [kɔ̃tʁazi]; Occitan: Contrasi) is a commune in the Ariège department in southwestern France.

== Population ==
Its inhabitants are called Contrasiens in French.

Historical population
Year	Pop.	±% p.a.
1968	105	—
1975	84	−3.14%
1982	82	−0.34%
1990	90	+1.17%
1999	83	−0.90%
2007	66	−2.82%
2012	68	+0.60%
2017	69	+0.29%
2023	76	+1.62%
Source: INSEE

== See also ==
- Communes of the Ariège department
