= Montardit =

Commune in Occitanie, France

- Commune
- Location of Montardit
- Location within France Location within Occitanie
- Coordinates: 43°04′11″N 1°11′42″E
- Country: France
- Region: Occitania
- Department: Ariège
- Arrondissement: Saint-Girons
- Canton: Portes du Couserans

Government
  - Mayor (2020–2026): Éric Couzinet
- Area^{1}: 7.26 km^{2} (2.80 sq mi)
- Elevation: 400 m (1,300 ft)
- Highest elevation: 564 m (1,850 ft)
- Lowest elevation: 340 m (1,120 ft)
- Population (2023): 224
  - Density: 30.9/km^{2} (79.9/sq mi)
- Time zone: UTC+01:00 (CET)
  - Summer (DST): UTC+02:00 (CEST)
- INSEE/Postal code: 09198 /09230
- ^{1} French Land Register data, which excludes lakes, ponds, glaciers > 1 km^{2} (0.386 sq mi or 247 acres) and river estuaries.

Montardit (French pronunciation: [mɔ̃taʁdi]) is a commune in the Ariège department in southwestern France.

== Population ==
Historical population
Year	Pop.	±% p.a.
1968	202	—
1975	198	−0.29%
1982	163	−2.74%
1990	135	−2.33%
1999	145	+0.80%
2007	181	+2.81%
2012	196	+1.61%
2017	190	−0.62%
2023	224	+2.78%
Source: INSEE

== See also ==
- Communes of the Ariège department
