= Tourtouse =

Commune in Occitanie, France

- Commune
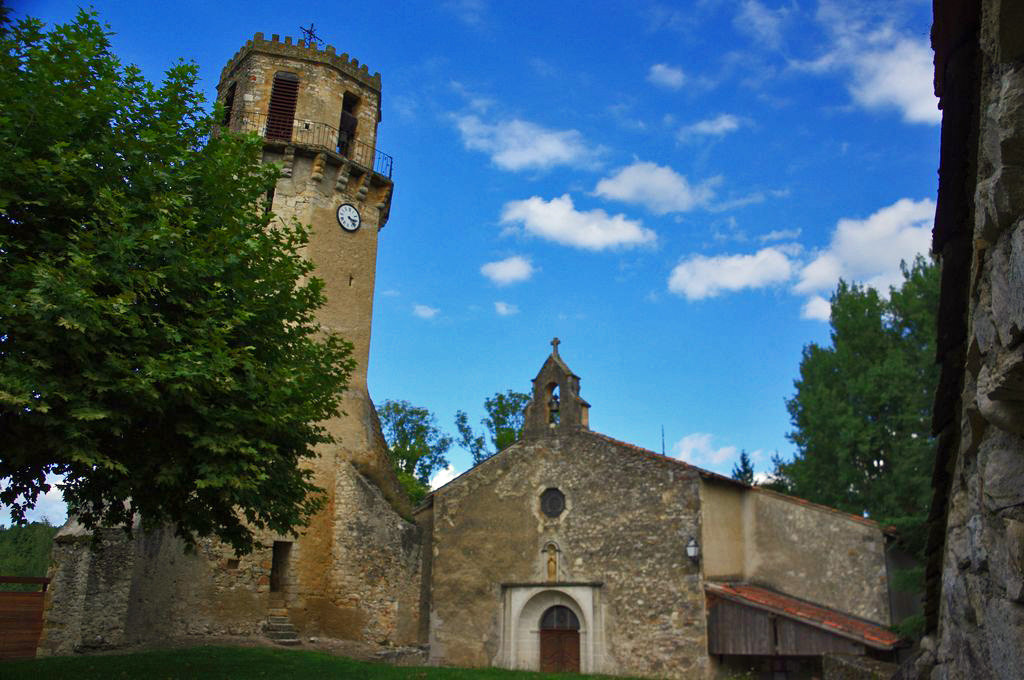
- The church in Tourtouse.
- Location of Tourtouse
- Location within France Location within Occitanie
- Coordinates: 43°05′38″N 1°07′30″E
- Country: France
- Region: Occitania
- Department: Ariège
- Arrondissement: Saint-Girons
- Canton: Portes du Couserans

Government
  - Mayor (2020–2026): Jacqueline Mauran
- Area^{1}: 11.87 km^{2} (4.58 sq mi)
- Elevation: 355 m (1,165 ft)
- Highest elevation: 560 m (1,840 ft)
- Lowest elevation: 346 m (1,135 ft)
- Population (2023): 169
  - Density: 14.2/km^{2} (36.9/sq mi)
- Demonym(s): Tourtousain, Tourtousaine
- Time zone: UTC+01:00 (CET)
  - Summer (DST): UTC+02:00 (CEST)
- INSEE/Postal code: 09313 /09230
- ^{1} French Land Register data, which excludes lakes, ponds, glaciers > 1 km^{2} (0.386 sq mi or 247 acres) and river estuaries.

Tourtouse (French pronunciation: [tuʁtuz]; Occitan: Tortosa) is a commune in the Ariège department and the administrative region of Occitania, France.

== Population ==
Inhabitants of Tourtouse are known as the Tourtousains (feminine: Tourtousaines) in French.

Historical population
Year	Pop.	±% p.a.
1968	224	—
1975	212	−0.78%
1982	201	−0.76%
1990	174	−1.79%
1999	169	−0.32%
2007	163	−0.45%
2012	151	−1.52%
2017	146	−0.67%
2023	169	+2.47%
Source: INSEE

== See also ==
- Communes of the Ariège department
