= Caumont, Ariège =

Commune in Occitanie, France

Caumont
- Commune
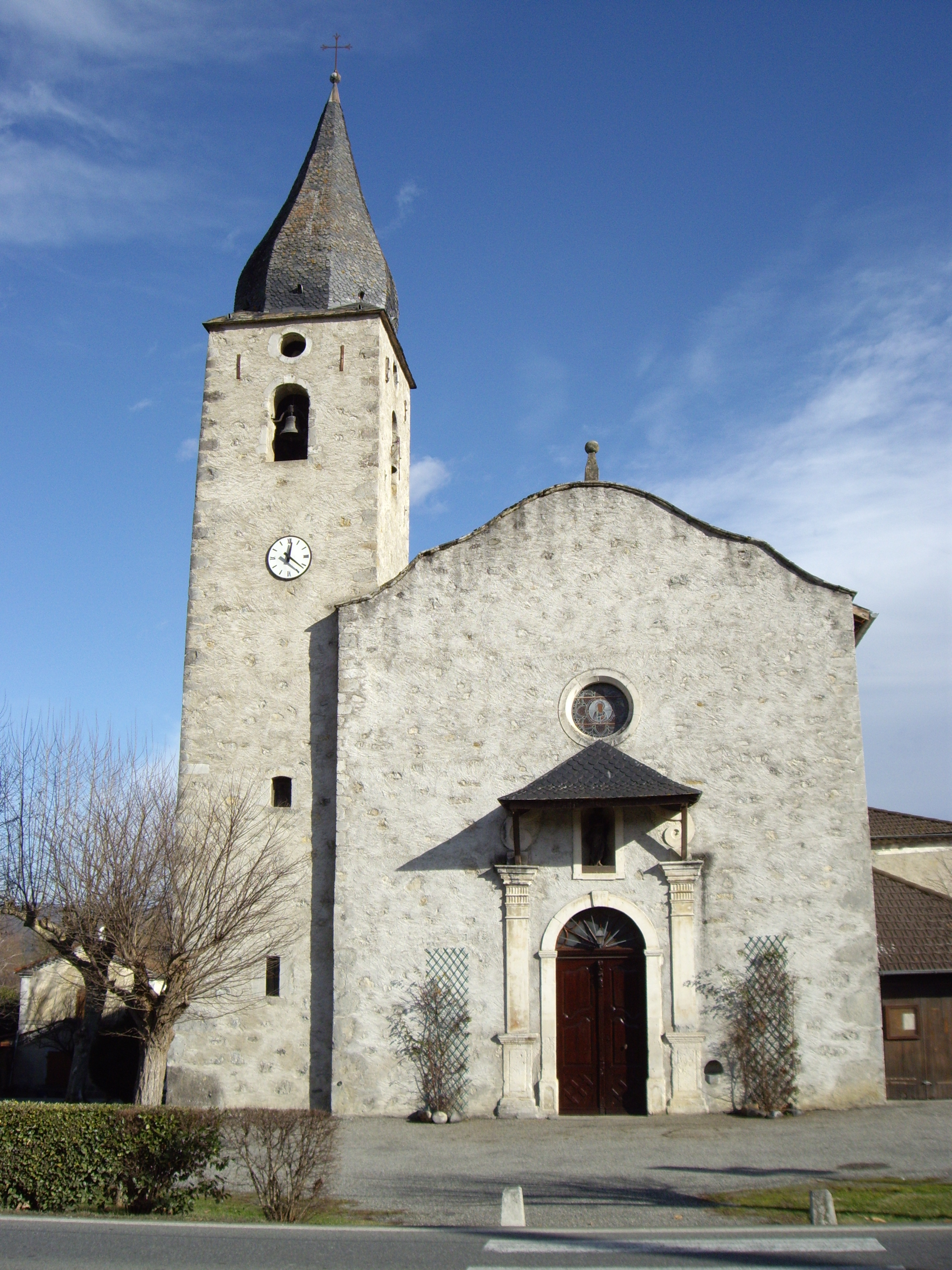
- The church in Caumont
- Location of Caumont
- Location within France Location within Occitanie
- Coordinates: 43°01′53″N 1°05′11″E
- Country: France
- Region: Occitania
- Department: Ariège
- Arrondissement: Saint-Girons
- Canton: Portes du Couserans

Government
  - Mayor (2020–2026): Jean-Jacques Méric
- Area^{1}: 9.22 km^{2} (3.56 sq mi)
- Elevation: 450 m (1,480 ft)
- Highest elevation: 528 m (1,732 ft)
- Lowest elevation: 338 m (1,109 ft)
- Population (2023): 336
  - Density: 36.4/km^{2} (94.4/sq mi)
- Time zone: UTC+01:00 (CET)
  - Summer (DST): UTC+02:00 (CEST)
- INSEE/Postal code: 09086 /09160
- ^{1} French Land Register data, which excludes lakes, ponds, glaciers > 1 km^{2} (0.386 sq mi or 247 acres) and river estuaries.

Caumont (French pronunciation: [komɔ̃]) is a commune in the Ariège department of southwestern France.

== Population ==
Historical population
Year	Pop.	±% p.a.
1968	292	—
1975	250	−2.19%
1982	255	+0.28%
1990	287	+1.49%
1999	313	+0.97%
2007	313	+0.00%
2012	307	−0.39%
2017	326	+1.21%
2023	336	+0.50%
Source: INSEE

== See also ==
- Communes of the Ariège department
