= Gajan, Ariège =

Commune in Occitanie, France

Gajan
- Commune
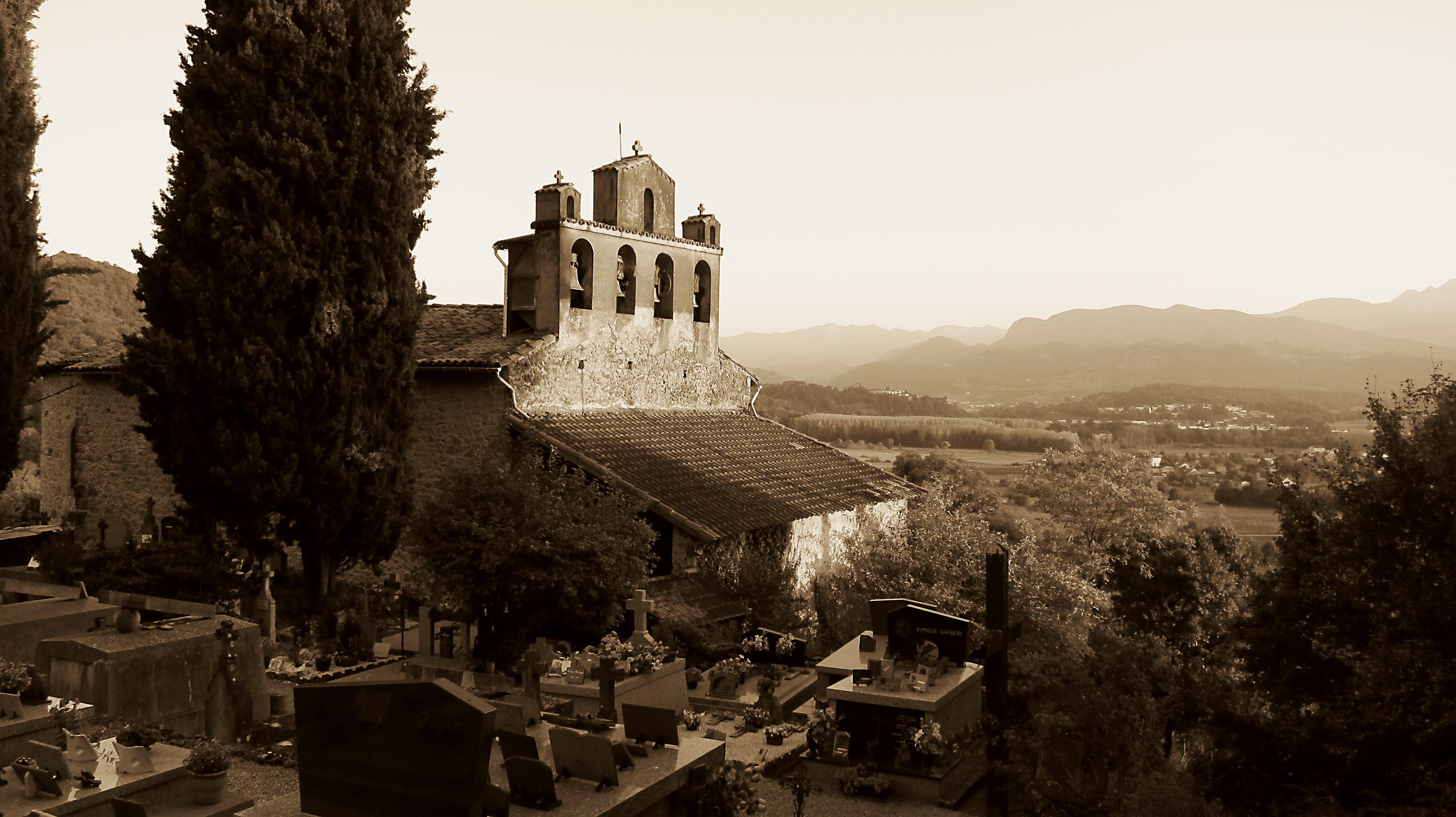
- The church in Gajan
- Location of Gajan
- Location within France Location within Occitanie
- Coordinates: 43°02′01″N 1°07′39″E
- Country: France
- Region: Occitania
- Department: Ariège
- Arrondissement: Saint-Girons
- Canton: Portes du Couserans

Government
  - Mayor (2020–2026): Nathalie Auriac
- Area^{1}: 8.17 km^{2} (3.15 sq mi)
- Elevation: 550 m (1,800 ft)
- Highest elevation: 600 m (2,000 ft)
- Lowest elevation: 365 m (1,198 ft)
- Population (2023): 340
  - Density: 42/km^{2} (110/sq mi)
- Time zone: UTC+01:00 (CET)
  - Summer (DST): UTC+02:00 (CEST)
- INSEE/Postal code: 09128 /09190
- ^{1} French Land Register data, which excludes lakes, ponds, glaciers > 1 km^{2} (0.386 sq mi or 247 acres) and river estuaries.

Gajan (French pronunciation: [ɡaʒɑ̃]) is a commune in the Ariège department in southwestern France.

== Population ==
Historical population
Year	Pop.	±% p.a.
1968	180	—
1975	201	+1.59%
1982	210	+0.63%
1990	281	+3.71%
1999	290	+0.35%
2007	296	+0.26%
2012	305	+0.60%
2017	309	+0.26%
2023	340	+1.61%
Source: INSEE

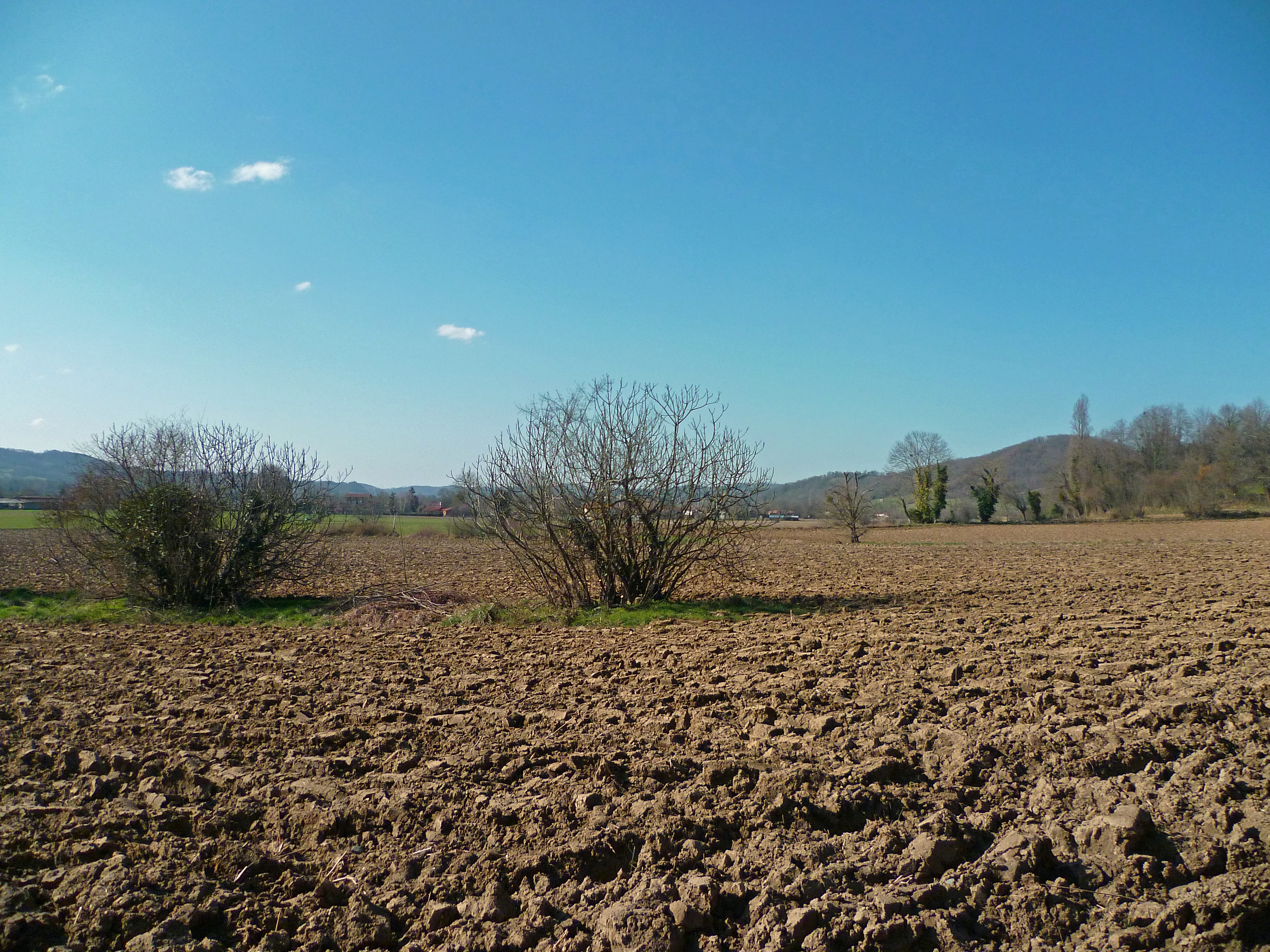
Ficus carica on a Gajan field

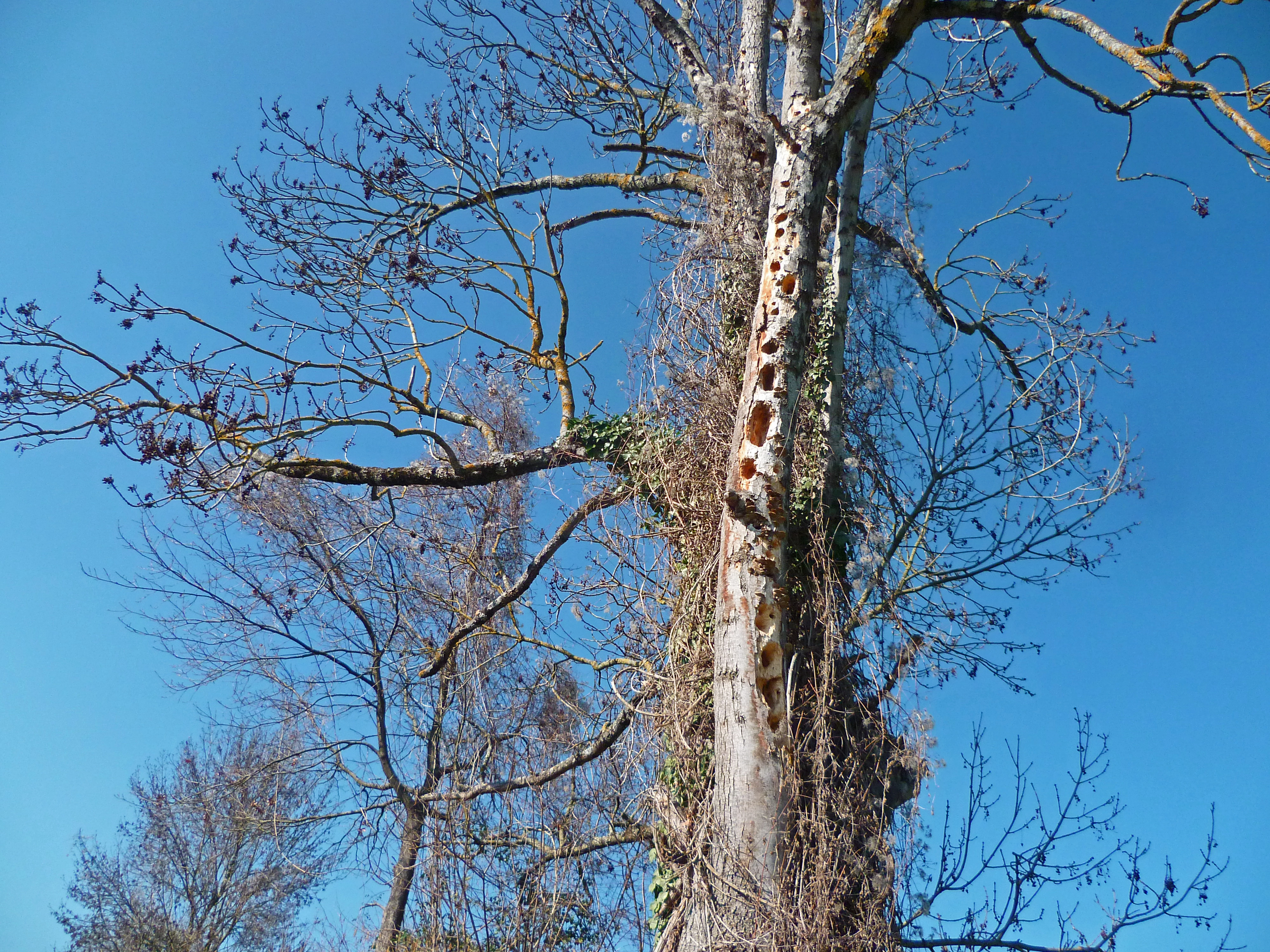
Fraxinus excelsior perforated by woodpeckers

== See also ==
- Communes of the Ariège department
