= Lorp-Sentaraille =

Commune in Occitanie, France

- Commune
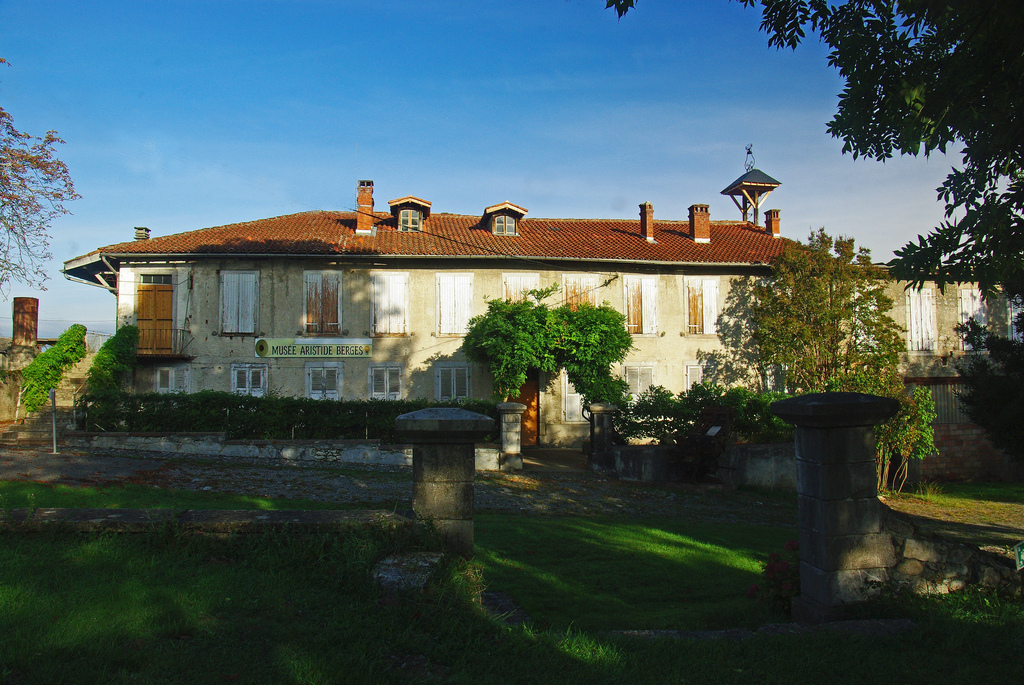
- The birthplace of Aristide Bergès, in Lorp-Sentaraille
- Location of Lorp-Sentaraille
- Location within France Location within Occitanie
- Coordinates: 43°00′36″N 1°07′13″E
- Country: France
- Region: Occitania
- Department: Ariège
- Arrondissement: Saint-Girons
- Canton: Portes du Couserans

Government
  - Mayor (2020–2026): Bernard Lamary
- Area^{1}: 6.15 km^{2} (2.37 sq mi)
- Elevation: 365 m (1,198 ft)
- Highest elevation: 418 m (1,371 ft)
- Lowest elevation: 354 m (1,161 ft)
- Population (2023): 1,381
  - Density: 225/km^{2} (582/sq mi)
- Time zone: UTC+01:00 (CET)
  - Summer (DST): UTC+02:00 (CEST)
- INSEE/Postal code: 09289 /09190
- ^{1} French Land Register data, which excludes lakes, ponds, glaciers > 1 km^{2} (0.386 sq mi or 247 acres) and river estuaries.

Lorp-Sentaraille (French pronunciation: [lɔʁp sɑ̃taʁaj]; Occitan: Lòrp e Senta Aralha) is a commune in the Ariège department in southwestern France.

== Population ==
Historical population
Year	Pop.	±% p.a.
1968	697	—
1975	852	+2.91%
1982	944	+1.48%
1990	1,092	+1.84%
1999	1,138	+0.46%
2007	1,239	+1.07%
2012	1,354	+1.79%
2017	1,467	+1.62%
2023	1,381	−1.00%
Source: INSEE

== See also ==
- Communes of the Ariège department
