= Mérigon =

Commune in Occitanie, France

- Commune
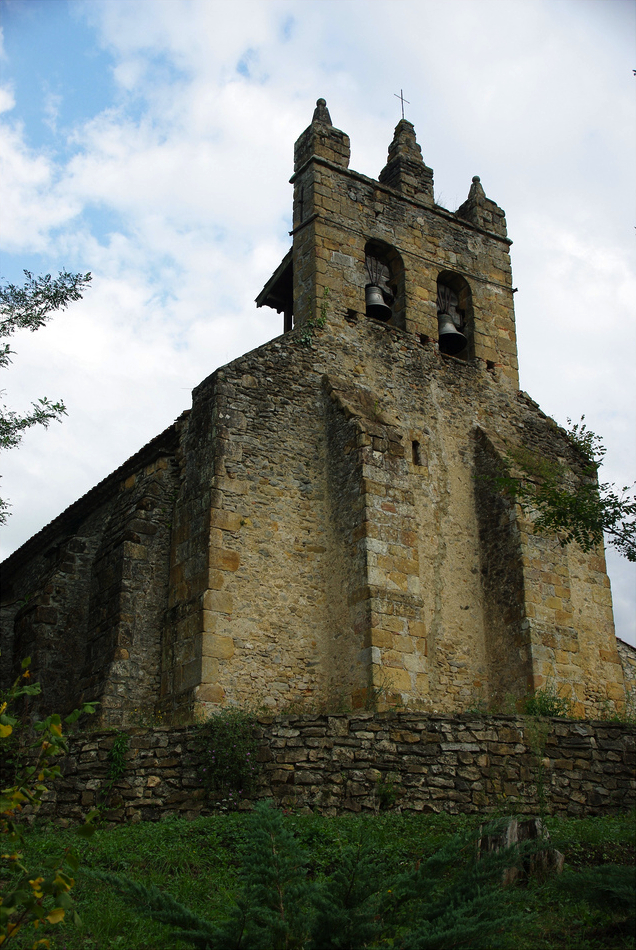
- The church in Mérigon
- Location of Mérigon
- Location within France Location within Occitanie
- Coordinates: 43°05′19″N 1°11′41″E
- Country: France
- Region: Occitania
- Department: Ariège
- Arrondissement: Saint-Girons
- Canton: Portes du Couserans

Government
  - Mayor (2020–2026): Yvan Gros
- Area^{1}: 6.33 km^{2} (2.44 sq mi)
- Elevation: 356 m (1,168 ft)
- Highest elevation: 554 m (1,818 ft)
- Lowest elevation: 319 m (1,047 ft)
- Population (2023): 114
  - Density: 18.0/km^{2} (46.6/sq mi)
- Time zone: UTC+01:00 (CET)
  - Summer (DST): UTC+02:00 (CEST)
- INSEE/Postal code: 09190 /09230
- ^{1} French Land Register data, which excludes lakes, ponds, glaciers > 1 km^{2} (0.386 sq mi or 247 acres) and river estuaries.

Mérigon (French pronunciation: [meʁiɡɔ̃]; Occitan: Merigon) is a commune in the Ariège department in southwestern France.

== Population ==
Historical population
Year	Pop.	±% p.a.
1968	131	—
1975	105	−3.11%
1982	97	−1.13%
1990	98	+0.13%
1999	103	+0.55%
2007	122	+2.14%
2012	115	−1.17%
2017	115	+0.00%
2023	114	−0.15%
Source: INSEE

== See also ==
- Communes of the Ariège department
