= Montgauch =

Commune in Occitanie, France

- Commune
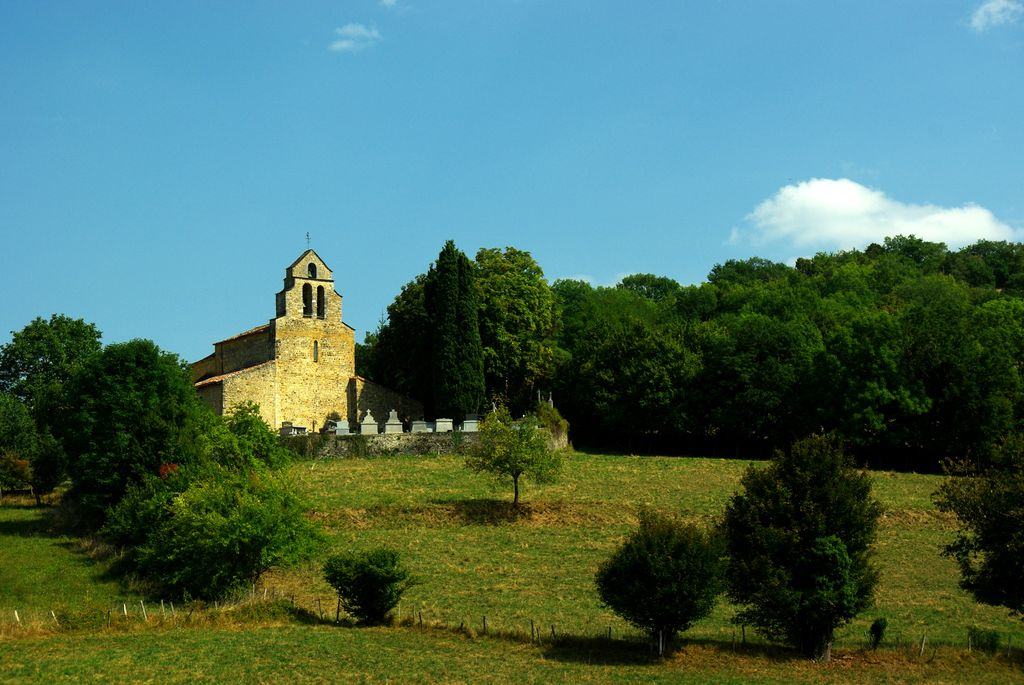
- The church in Montgauch
- Location of Montgauch
- Location within France Location within Occitanie
- Coordinates: 43°00′05″N 1°04′34″E
- Country: France
- Region: Occitania
- Department: Ariège
- Arrondissement: Saint-Girons
- Canton: Portes du Couserans

Government
  - Mayor (2020–2026): Guy Icart
- Area^{1}: 9.15 km^{2} (3.53 sq mi)
- Elevation: 500 m (1,600 ft)
- Highest elevation: 1,151 m (3,776 ft)
- Lowest elevation: 376 m (1,234 ft)
- Population (2023): 112
  - Density: 12.2/km^{2} (31.7/sq mi)
- Time zone: UTC+01:00 (CET)
  - Summer (DST): UTC+02:00 (CEST)
- INSEE/Postal code: 09208 /09160
- ^{1} French Land Register data, which excludes lakes, ponds, glaciers > 1 km^{2} (0.386 sq mi or 247 acres) and river estuaries.

Montgauch is a commune in the Ariège department in southwestern France.

== Population ==
Historical population
Year	Pop.	±% p.a.
1968	157	—
1975	150	−0.65%
1982	116	−3.61%
1990	125	+0.94%
1999	129	+0.35%
2007	117	−1.21%
2012	122	+0.84%
2017	122	+0.00%
2023	112	−1.42%
Source: INSEE

== See also ==
- Communes of the Ariège department
