= Sainte-Croix-Volvestre =

Commune in Occitanie, France

- Commune
- Location of Sainte-Croix-Volvestre
- Location within France Location within Occitanie
- Coordinates: 43°07′36″N 1°10′30″E
- Country: France
- Region: Occitania
- Department: Ariège
- Arrondissement: Saint-Girons
- Canton: Portes du Couserans

Government
  - Mayor (2020–2026): Jean Doussain
- Area^{1}: 19.66 km^{2} (7.59 sq mi)
- Elevation: 300 m (980 ft)
- Highest elevation: 525 m (1,722 ft)
- Lowest elevation: 266 m (873 ft)
- Population (2023): 649
  - Density: 33.0/km^{2} (85.5/sq mi)
- Time zone: UTC+01:00 (CET)
  - Summer (DST): UTC+02:00 (CEST)
- INSEE/Postal code: 09257 /09230
- ^{1} French Land Register data, which excludes lakes, ponds, glaciers > 1 km^{2} (0.386 sq mi or 247 acres) and river estuaries.

Sainte-Croix-Volvestre (Languedocien: Senta Crotz de Volvèstre) is a commune in the Ariège department in southwestern France.

== Population ==
Inhabitants of Sainte-Croix-Volvestre are called Croissants in French.

Historical population
Year	Pop.	±% p.a.
1968	502	—
1975	512	+0.28%
1982	520	+0.22%
1990	585	+1.48%
1999	611	+0.48%
2007	661	+0.99%
2012	641	−0.61%
2017	626	−0.47%
2023	649	+0.60%
Source: INSEE

== See also ==
- Communes of the Ariège department
