= Taurignan-Castet =

Commune in Occitanie, France

- Commune
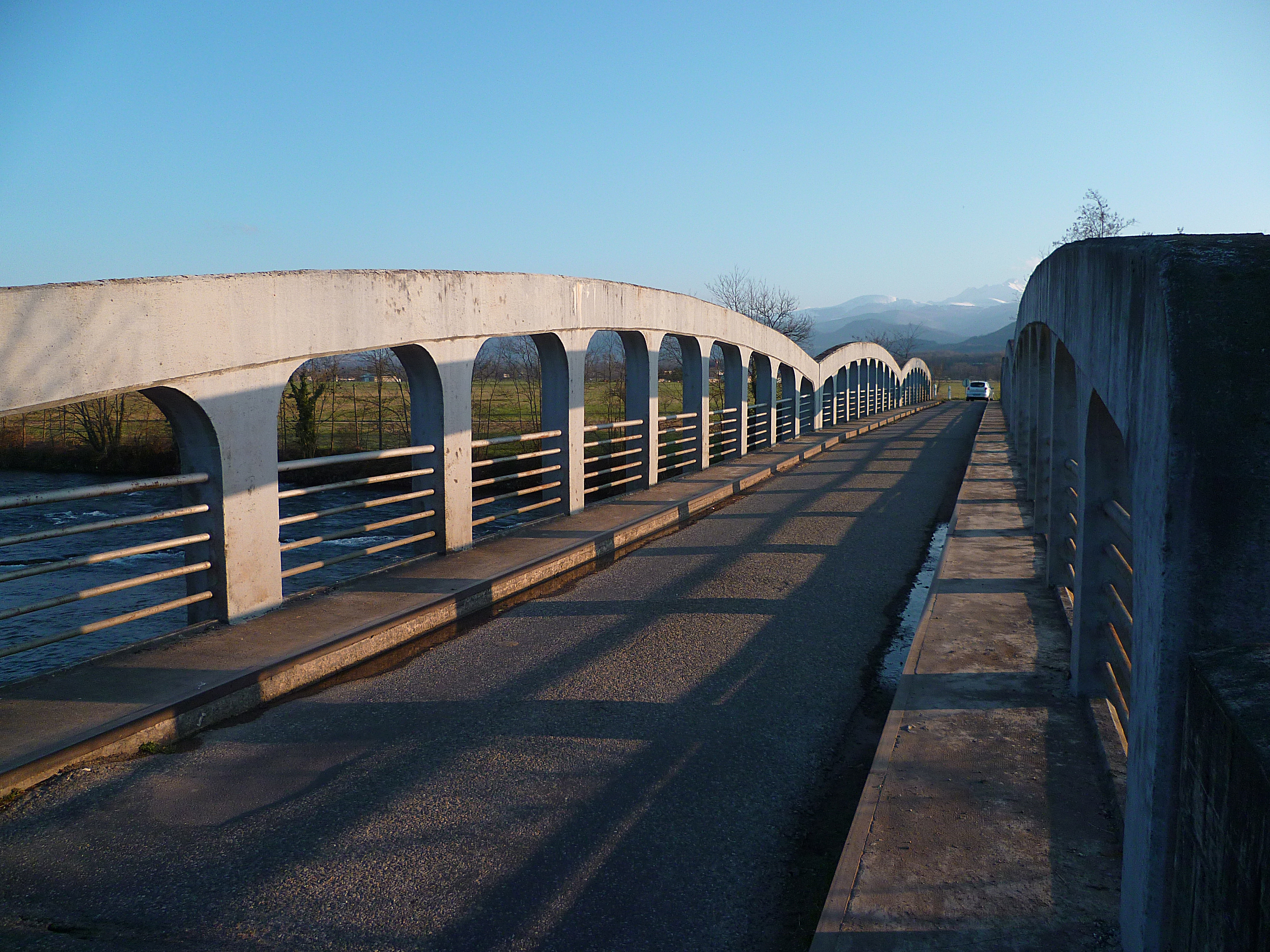
- The bridge in Taurignan-Castet
- Location of Taurignan-Castet
- Location within France Location within Occitanie
- Coordinates: 43°02′27″N 1°05′30″E
- Country: France
- Region: Occitania
- Department: Ariège
- Arrondissement: Saint-Girons
- Canton: Portes du Couserans

Government
  - Mayor (2020–2026): Jean-Paul Falguié
- Area^{1}: 6.78 km^{2} (2.62 sq mi)
- Elevation: 326 m (1,070 ft)
- Highest elevation: 584 m (1,916 ft)
- Lowest elevation: 354 m (1,161 ft)
- Population (2023): 163
  - Density: 24.0/km^{2} (62.3/sq mi)
- Time zone: UTC+01:00 (CET)
  - Summer (DST): UTC+02:00 (CEST)
- INSEE/Postal code: 09307 /09160
- ^{1} French Land Register data, which excludes lakes, ponds, glaciers > 1 km^{2} (0.386 sq mi or 247 acres) and river estuaries.

Taurignan-Castet is a commune in the Ariège department in southwestern France.

== Population ==
Inhabitants of Taurignan-Castet are called Taurignanois in French.

Historical population
Year	Pop.	±% p.a.
1968	191	—
1975	179	−0.92%
1982	150	−2.49%
1990	144	−0.51%
1999	152	+0.60%
2007	155	+0.24%
2012	178	+2.81%
2017	165	−1.51%
2023	163	−0.20%
Source: INSEE

== See also ==
- Communes of the Ariège department
