= Montjoie-en-Couserans =

Commune in Occitanie, France

- Commune
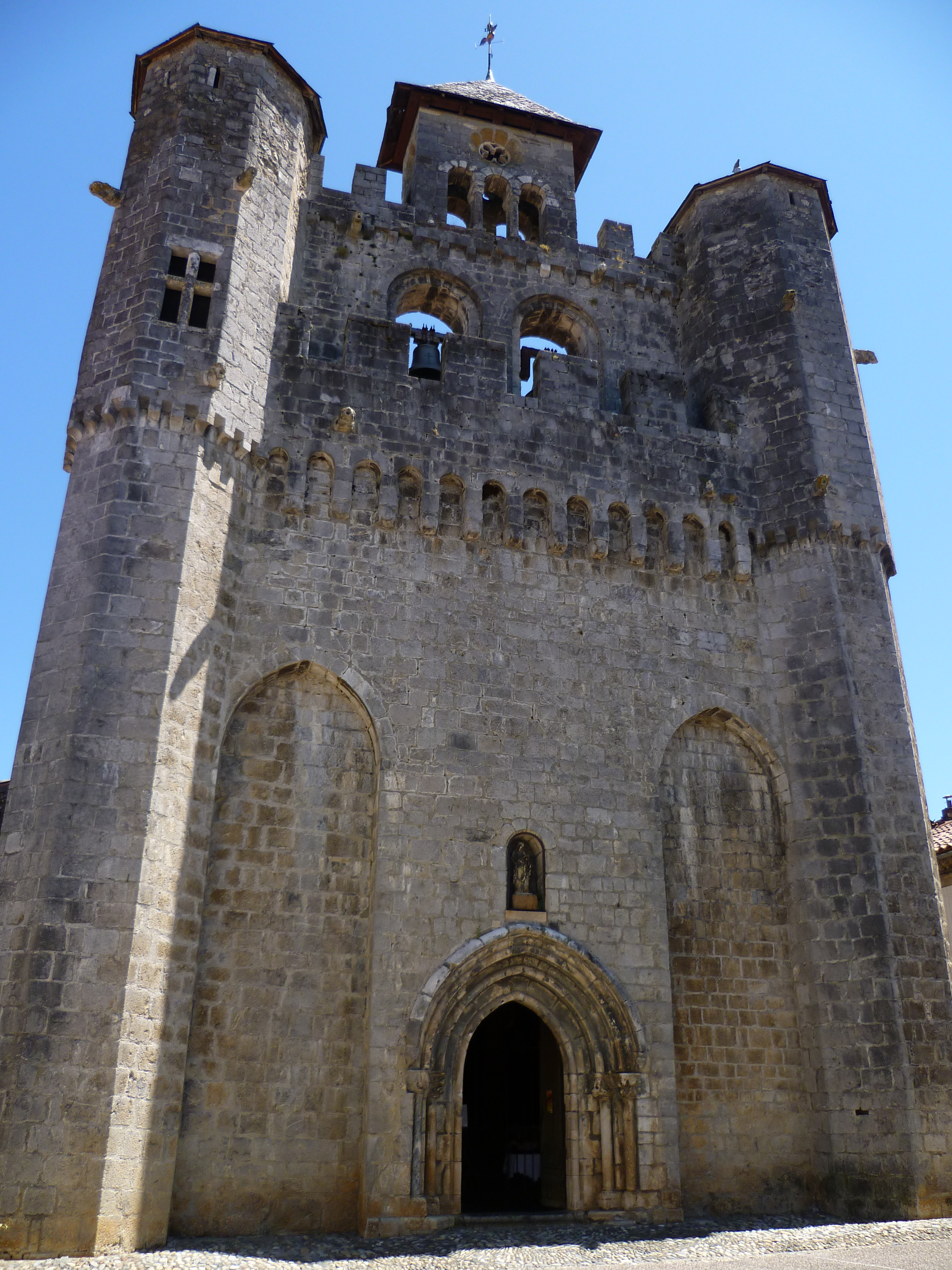
- The church in Montjoie-en-Couserans
- Location of Montjoie-en-Couserans
- Location within France Location within Occitanie
- Coordinates: 43°00′09″N 1°09′36″E
- Country: France
- Region: Occitania
- Department: Ariège
- Arrondissement: Saint-Girons
- Canton: Portes du Couserans

Government
  - Mayor (2020–2026): Ginette Busca
- Area^{1}: 29.63 km^{2} (11.44 sq mi)
- Elevation: 450 m (1,480 ft)
- Highest elevation: 677 m (2,221 ft)
- Lowest elevation: 393 m (1,289 ft)
- Population (2023): 992
  - Density: 33.5/km^{2} (86.7/sq mi)
- Time zone: UTC+01:00 (CET)
  - Summer (DST): UTC+02:00 (CEST)
- INSEE/Postal code: 09209 /09200
- ^{1} French Land Register data, which excludes lakes, ponds, glaciers > 1 km^{2} (0.386 sq mi or 247 acres) and river estuaries.

Montjoie-en-Couserans (French pronunciation: [mɔ̃ʒwa ɑ̃ kuzʁɑ̃], literally Montjoie in Couserans; Occitan: Montjòi de Coserans) is a commune in the Ariège department in southwestern France, in the northwest of the Ariège department, in the Occitanie region. Historically and culturally, the town is part of Couserans, an area with Gascon roots structured by the course of the Salat.

Exposed to an altered oceanic climate, the commune is drained by the Volp, the Baup, the Badech, the Birosse, and several other minor streams. Located within the Ariège Pyrenees Regional Natural Park, its protected natural areas include a conservation zone for crayfish streams (spanning Artix, Moulicot, and Volp) alongside six designated zones recognized for their ecological, faunal, and floral significance.

Montjoie-en-Couserans is a rural commune which had 992 inhabitants in 2023, after having experienced a sharp increase in population since 1975. It is part of the Saint-Girons catchment area. Its inhabitants are called Montjoliens or Montjoliennes.

The architectural heritage of the town includes two buildings protected as historic monuments: the Notre-Dame-de-l'Assomption church, listed in 1901, and the City Gate, listed in 1965.

== Population ==
Historical population
Year	Pop.	±% p.a.
1968	801	—
1975	774	−0.49%
1982	857	+1.47%
1990	926	+0.97%
1999	977	+0.60%
2007	1,047	+0.87%
2012	1,053	+0.11%
2017	1,082	+0.54%
2023	992	−1.44%
Source: INSEE

== History ==
The Bastide of Montjoie was founded in 1268 by Alphonse de Poitiers, a prince of royal blood, the brother of Louis IX under a landscaping contract with the Bishop of Couserans.

== See also ==
- Communes of the Ariège department
