= Cazavet =

Commune in Occitanie, France

- Commune
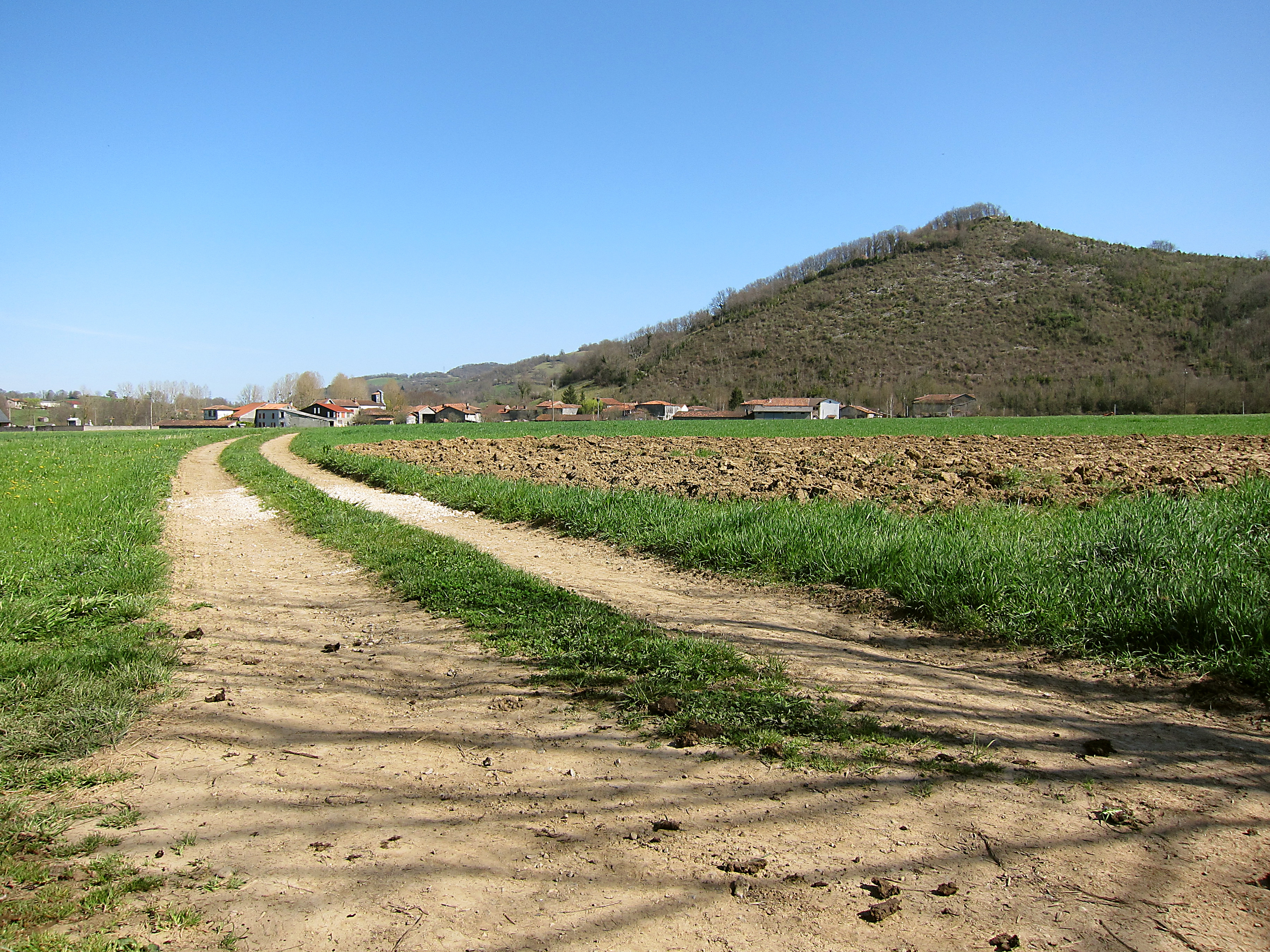
- A general view of Cazavet
- Location of Cazavet
- Location within France Location within Occitanie
- Coordinates: 43°00′10″N 1°02′39″E
- Country: France
- Region: Occitania
- Department: Ariège
- Arrondissement: Saint-Girons
- Canton: Portes du Couserans

Government
  - Mayor (2020–2026): Geneviève Osmond
- Area^{1}: 17.93 km^{2} (6.92 sq mi)
- Elevation: 428 m (1,404 ft)
- Highest elevation: 1,247 m (4,091 ft)
- Lowest elevation: 367 m (1,204 ft)
- Population (2023): 204
  - Density: 11.4/km^{2} (29.5/sq mi)
- Time zone: UTC+01:00 (CET)
  - Summer (DST): UTC+02:00 (CEST)
- INSEE/Postal code: 09091 /09160
- ^{1} French Land Register data, which excludes lakes, ponds, glaciers > 1 km^{2} (0.386 sq mi or 247 acres) and river estuaries.

Cazavet (French pronunciation: [kazavɛ]; Occitan: Casavèth) is a commune in the Ariège department in southwestern France.

== Population ==
Historical population
Year	Pop.	±% p.a.
1968	240	—
1975	199	−2.64%
1982	181	−1.35%
1990	185	+0.27%
1999	181	−0.24%
2007	190	+0.61%
2012	222	+3.16%
2017	223	+0.09%
2023	204	−1.47%
Source: INSEE

== See also ==
- Communes of the Ariège department
