= Canton of Portes du Couserans =

Coordinates: 43.00°N 1.14°E

- Canton
- Situation of the canton of Portes du Couserans in the department of Ariège
- Country: France
- Region: Occitania
- Department: Ariège
- No. of communes: {{{nbcomm}}}
- Population (2023): 9,610
- INSEE code: 0911

The canton of Portes du Couserans is an administrative division of the Ariège department, southern France. It was created at the French canton reorganisation which came into effect in March 2015. Its seat is in Saint-Lizier.

It consists of the following communes:

1. Bagert
2. Barjac
3. La Bastide-du-Salat
4. Bédeille
5. Betchat
6. Caumont
7. Cazavet
8. Cérizols
9. Contrazy
10. Fabas
11. Gajan
12. Lacave
13. Lasserre
14. Lorp-Sentaraille
15. Mauvezin-de-Prat
16. Mauvezin-de-Sainte-Croix
17. Mercenac
18. Mérigon
19. Montardit
20. Montesquieu-Avantès
21. Montgauch
22. Montjoie-en-Couserans
23. Prat-Bonrepaux
24. Sainte-Croix-Volvestre
25. Saint-Lizier
26. Taurignan-Castet
27. Taurignan-Vieux
28. Tourtouse
