= Lasserre, Ariège =

Commune in Occitanie, France

Lasserre
- Commune
- Location of Lasserre
- Location within France Location within Occitanie
- Coordinates: 43°04′13″N 1°10′16″E
- Country: France
- Region: Occitania
- Department: Ariège
- Arrondissement: Saint-Girons
- Canton: Portes du Couserans

Government
  - Mayor (2020–2026): Alain Bari
- Area^{1}: 8.47 km^{2} (3.27 sq mi)
- Elevation: 574 m (1,883 ft)
- Highest elevation: 576 m (1,890 ft)
- Lowest elevation: 360 m (1,180 ft)
- Population (2023): 252
  - Density: 29.8/km^{2} (77.1/sq mi)
- Time zone: UTC+01:00 (CET)
  - Summer (DST): UTC+02:00 (CEST)
- INSEE/Postal code: 09158 /09230
- ^{1} French Land Register data, which excludes lakes, ponds, glaciers > 1 km^{2} (0.386 sq mi or 247 acres) and river estuaries.

Lasserre (French pronunciation: [lasɛʁ]; Occitan: La Sèrra) is a commune in the Ariège department in southwestern France.

It was the home of Alexander Grothendieck for over ten years until his death.

== Population ==
Historical population
Year	Pop.	±% p.a.
1968	238	—
1975	196	−2.74%
1982	173	−1.77%
1990	162	−0.82%
1999	169	+0.47%
2007	185	+1.14%
2012	229	+4.36%
2017	247	+1.52%
2023	252	+0.33%
Source: INSEE

== See also ==
- Communes of the Ariège department
