= Prat-Bonrepaux =

Commune in Occitanie, France

- Commune
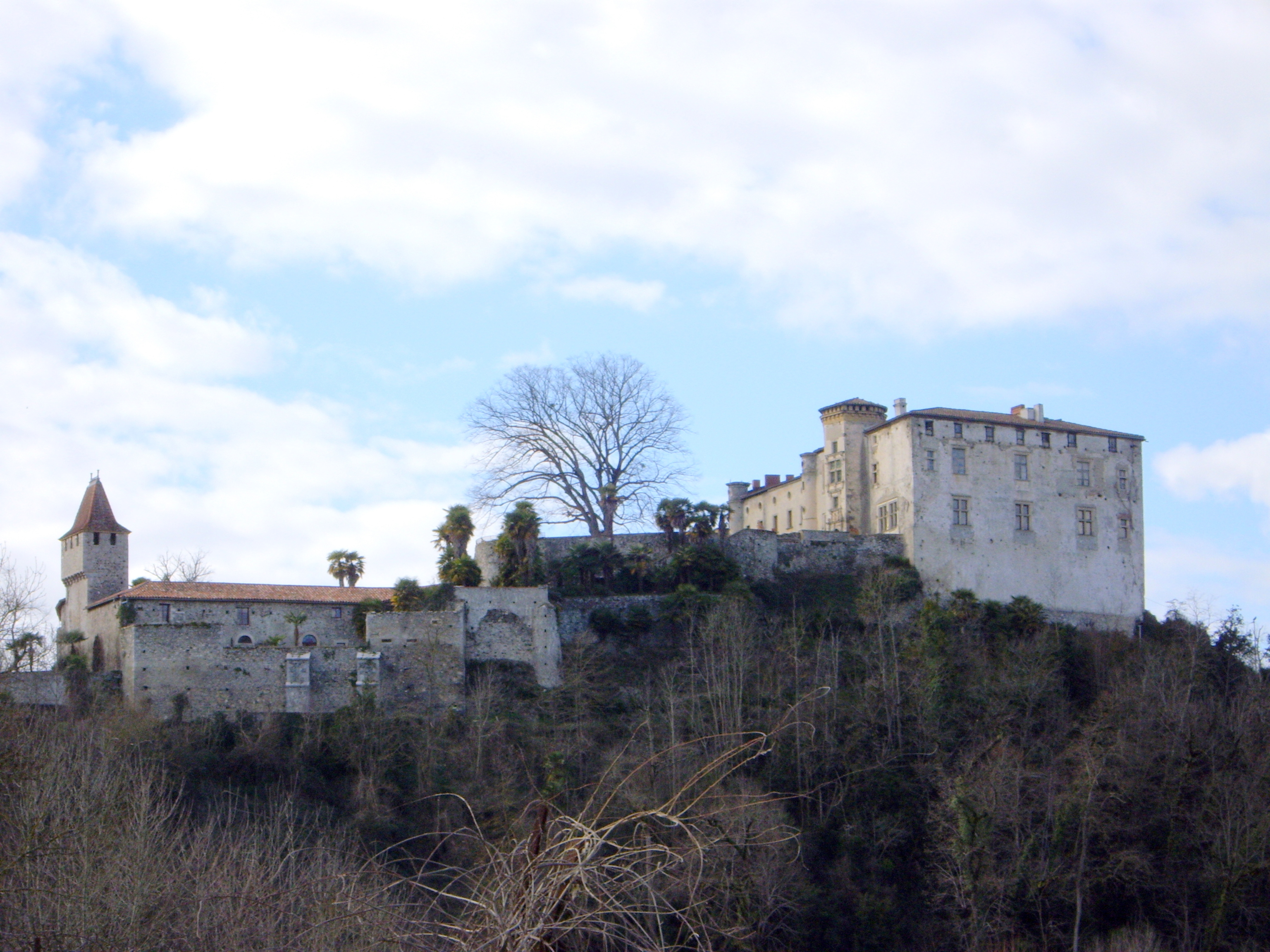
- The chateau in Prat
- Location of Prat-Bonrepaux
- Location within France Location within Occitanie
- Coordinates: 43°01′47″N 1°01′11″E
- Country: France
- Region: Occitania
- Department: Ariège
- Arrondissement: Saint-Girons
- Canton: Portes du Couserans

Government
  - Mayor (2020–2026): Emmanuel Cécile
- Area^{1}: 14.43 km^{2} (5.57 sq mi)
- Elevation: 375 m (1,230 ft)
- Highest elevation: 727 m (2,385 ft)
- Lowest elevation: 319 m (1,047 ft)
- Population (2023): 888
  - Density: 61.5/km^{2} (159/sq mi)
- Time zone: UTC+01:00 (CET)
  - Summer (DST): UTC+02:00 (CEST)
- INSEE/Postal code: 09235 /09160
- ^{1} French Land Register data, which excludes lakes, ponds, glaciers > 1 km^{2} (0.386 sq mi or 247 acres) and river estuaries.

Prat-Bonrepaux is a commune in the Ariège department in the Occitanie region of southwestern France.

== Population ==
Inhabitants are called Pratéens in French.

Historical population
Year	Pop.	±% p.a.
1968	861	—
1975	842	−0.32%
1982	778	−1.12%
1990	801	+0.36%
1999	809	+0.11%
2007	861	+0.78%
2012	850	−0.26%
2017	917	+1.53%
2023	888	−0.53%
Source: INSEE

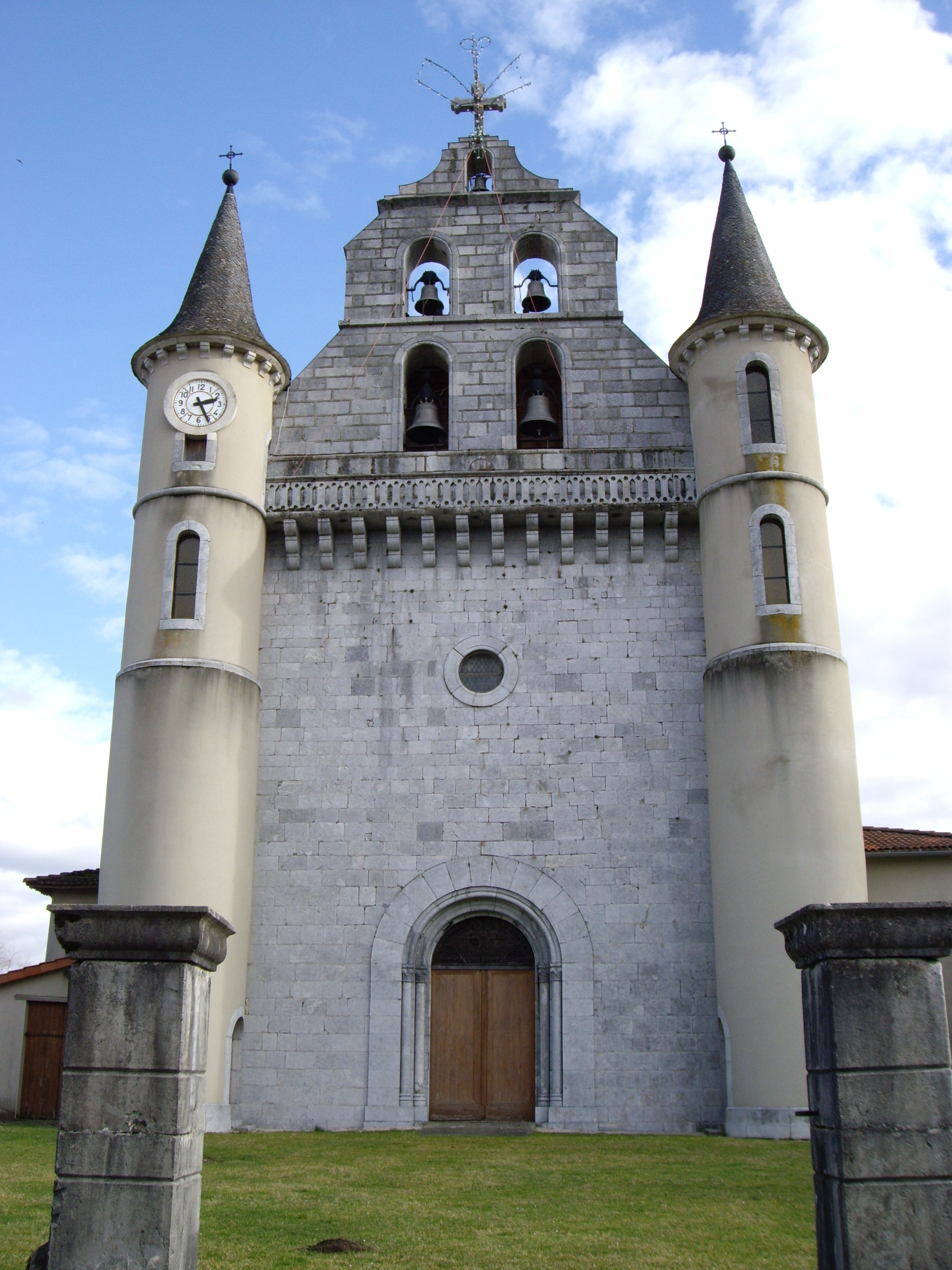

== See also ==
- Communes of the Ariège department
