= Bédeille, Ariège =

Commune in Occitanie, France

Bédeille
- Commune
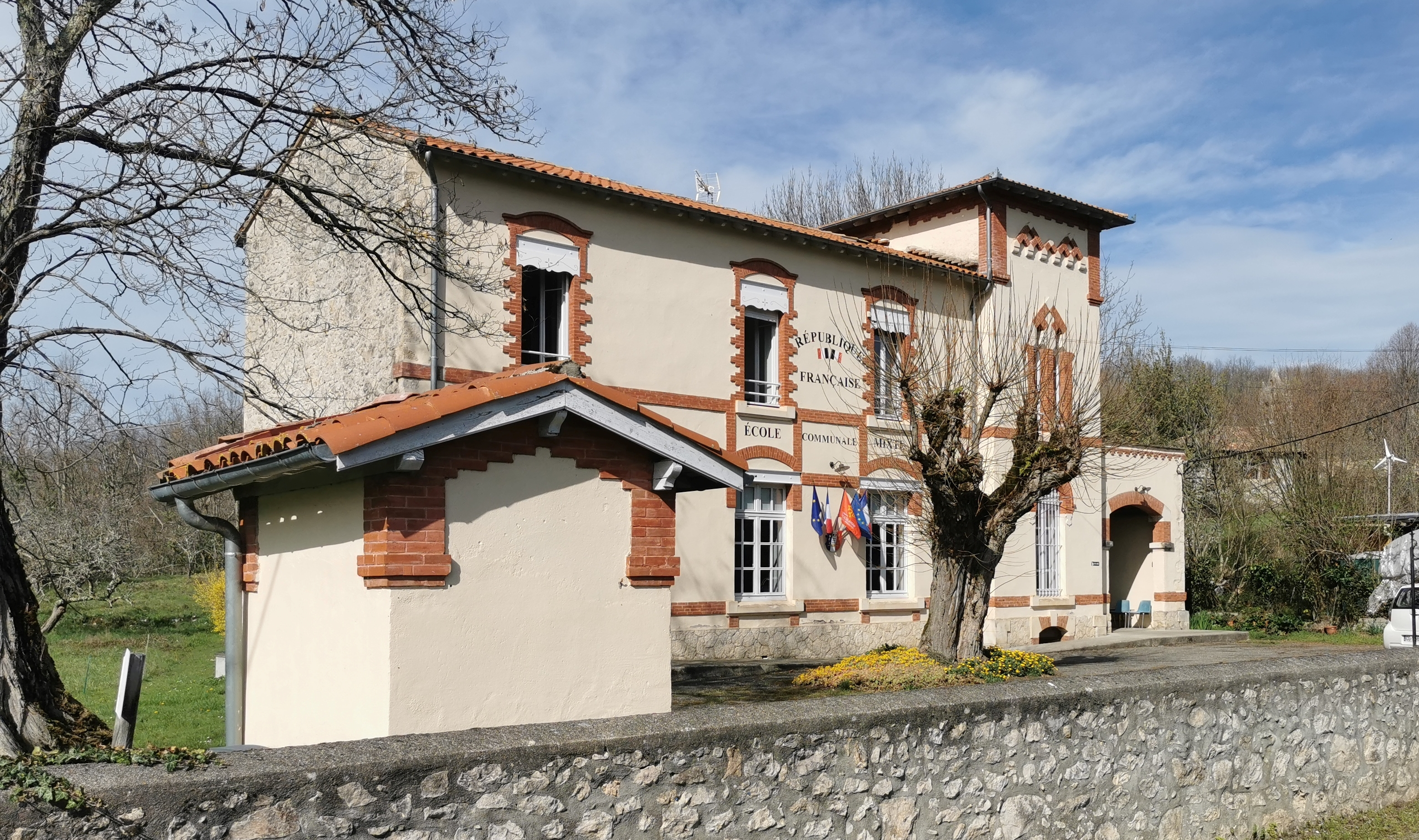
- Bédeille Town hall
- Location of Bédeille
- Location within France Location within Occitanie
- Coordinates: 43°05′19″N 1°06′16″E
- Country: France
- Region: Occitania
- Department: Ariège
- Arrondissement: Saint-Girons
- Canton: Portes du Couserans

Government
  - Mayor (2021–2026): Daniel Incamps
- Area^{1}: 9.46 km^{2} (3.65 sq mi)
- Elevation: 450 m (1,480 ft)
- Highest elevation: 590 m (1,940 ft)
- Lowest elevation: 330 m (1,080 ft)
- Population (2023): 81
  - Density: 8.6/km^{2} (22/sq mi)
- Time zone: UTC+01:00 (CET)
  - Summer (DST): UTC+02:00 (CEST)
- INSEE/Postal code: 09046 /09230
- ^{1} French Land Register data, which excludes lakes, ponds, glaciers > 1 km^{2} (0.386 sq mi or 247 acres) and river estuaries.

Bédeille (French pronunciation: [bedɛj]; Occitan: Vedelha) is a commune in the Ariège department of southwestern France.

== Population ==
Historical population
Year	Pop.	±% p.a.
1968	83	—
1975	73	−1.82%
1982	76	+0.58%
1990	56	−3.75%
1999	72	+2.83%
2007	80	+1.33%
2012	77	−0.76%
2017	70	−1.89%
2023	81	+2.46%
Source: INSEE

Inhabitants of Bédeille are called Bédeillais in French.

== See also ==
- Communes of the Ariège department
