= Mauvezin-de-Prat =

Commune in Occitanie, France

- Commune
- Location of Mauvezin-de-Prat
- Location within France Location within Occitanie
- Coordinates: 43°01′54″N 0°59′51″E
- Country: France
- Region: Occitania
- Department: Ariège
- Arrondissement: Saint-Girons
- Canton: Portes du Couserans

Government
  - Mayor (2020–2026): Alain Cau
- Area^{1}: 1.85 km^{2} (0.71 sq mi)
- Elevation: 362 m (1,188 ft)
- Highest elevation: 601 m (1,972 ft)
- Lowest elevation: 325 m (1,066 ft)
- Population (2023): 98
  - Density: 53/km^{2} (140/sq mi)
- Time zone: UTC+01:00 (CET)
  - Summer (DST): UTC+02:00 (CEST)
- INSEE/Postal code: 09183 /09160
- ^{1} French Land Register data, which excludes lakes, ponds, glaciers > 1 km^{2} (0.386 sq mi or 247 acres) and river estuaries.

Mauvezin-de-Prat (French pronunciation: [mov(ə)zɛ̃ də pʁa]; Occitan: Mauvedin de Prat) is a commune in the Ariège department in southwestern France.

== Population ==
Historical population
Year	Pop.	±% p.a.
1968	66	—
1975	57	−2.07%
1982	50	−1.85%
1990	52	+0.49%
1999	68	+3.03%
2007	77	+1.57%
2012	91	+3.40%
2017	102	+2.31%
2023	98	−0.66%
Source: INSEE

== See also ==
- Communes of the Ariège department
