= Mercenac =

Commune in Occitanie, France

- Commune
- Location of Mercenac
- Location within France Location within Occitanie
- Coordinates: 43°02′29″N 1°04′42″E
- Country: France
- Region: Occitania
- Department: Ariège
- Arrondissement: Saint-Girons
- Canton: Portes du Couserans

Government
  - Mayor (2020–2026): Raymond Coumes
- Area^{1}: 13.57 km^{2} (5.24 sq mi)
- Elevation: 350 m (1,150 ft)
- Highest elevation: 544 m (1,785 ft)
- Lowest elevation: 328 m (1,076 ft)
- Population (2023): 352
  - Density: 25.9/km^{2} (67.2/sq mi)
- Time zone: UTC+01:00 (CET)
  - Summer (DST): UTC+02:00 (CEST)
- INSEE/Postal code: 09187 /09160
- ^{1} French Land Register data, which excludes lakes, ponds, glaciers > 1 km^{2} (0.386 sq mi or 247 acres) and river estuaries.

Mercenac (French pronunciation: [mɛʁsənak]) is a commune in the Ariège department in southwestern France.

== Population ==
Historical population
Year	Pop.	±% p.a.
1968	266	—
1975	230	−2.06%
1982	178	−3.60%
1990	219	+2.62%
1999	251	+1.53%
2007	319	+3.04%
2012	381	+3.62%
2017	363	−0.96%
2023	352	−0.51%
Source: INSEE

== See also ==
- Communes of the Ariège department
