= Barjac, Ariège =

Commune in Occitanie, France

Barjac
- Commune
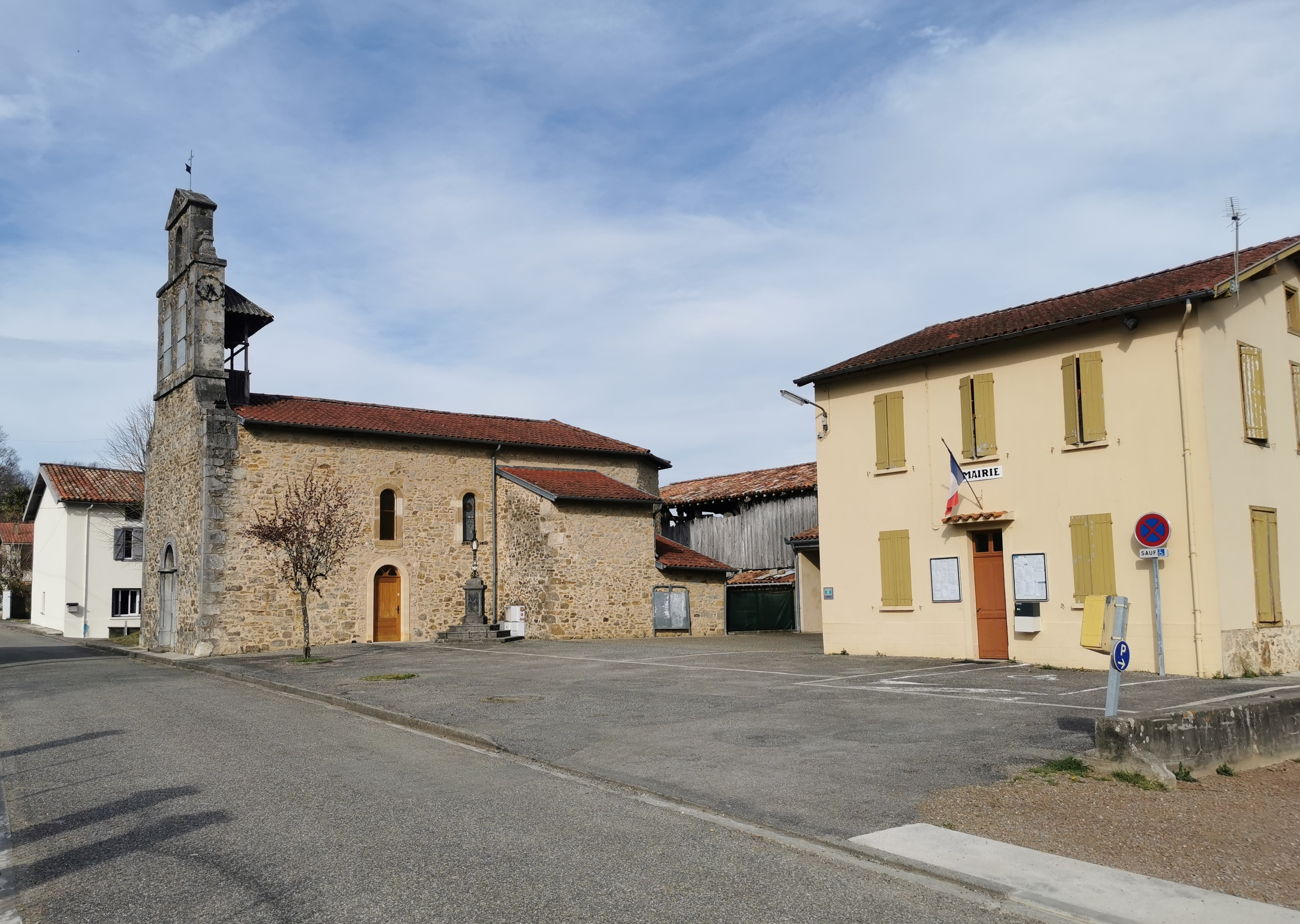
- Barjac Town hall

- Coat of arms
- Location of Barjac
- Location within France Location within Occitanie
- Coordinates: 43°04′00″N 1°08′06″E
- Country: France
- Region: Occitania
- Department: Ariège
- Arrondissement: Saint-Girons
- Canton: Portes du Couserans
- Intercommunality: Couserans-Pyrénées

Government
  - Mayor (2020–2026): Daniel Artaud
- Area^{1}: 2.78 km^{2} (1.07 sq mi)
- Elevation: 466 m (1,529 ft)
- Highest elevation: 603 m (1,978 ft)
- Lowest elevation: 404 m (1,325 ft)
- Population (2023): 45
  - Density: 16/km^{2} (42/sq mi)
- Time zone: UTC+01:00 (CET)
  - Summer (DST): UTC+02:00 (CEST)
- INSEE/Postal code: 09037 /09230
- ^{1} French Land Register data, which excludes lakes, ponds, glaciers > 1 km^{2} (0.386 sq mi or 247 acres) and river estuaries.

Barjac (French pronunciation: [baʁʒak]) is a commune in the Ariège department, Occitania, southwestern France.

== Geography ==
Barjac is located in the old Volvestre region of Languedoc some 10 km north of Saint-Girons and 60 km south by south-west of Toulouse. Access to the commune is by route D303A which branches off the D3 west of the commune and passes through the commune east then south to join the D303 to La Crouzette south-east of the commune. It is a part of the Natural Regional Park of Pyrénées ariégeoises. The commune is mixed forest and farmland.

The Grande Goutte stream forms the western border of the commune as it flows north to join Le Lens river north of the commune. Le Macaoude stream similarly forms the eastern border as it flows north to join Le Lens just north of the commune.

== History ==
Barzac appears as Barzac on the 1750 Cassini Map and the same on the 1790 version.

== Demography ==
The inhabitants of the commune are known as Barjacois or Barjacoises in French.

Historical population

Year	Pop.	±% p.a.
1793	248	—
1821	247	−0.01%
1846	288	+0.62%
1872	194	−1.51%
1901	118	−1.70%
1921	100	−0.82%
1936	76	−1.81%
1946	51	−3.91%
1954	34	−4.94%
1962	34	+0.00%

Year	Pop.	±% p.a.
1968	30	−2.06%
1975	26	−2.02%
1982	29	+1.57%
1990	29	+0.00%
1999	42	+4.20%
2007	39	−0.92%
2012	36	−1.59%
2017	42	+3.13%
2023	45	+1.16%

Source: EHESS and INSEE

== See also ==
- Communes of the Ariège department
