= Mauvezin-de-Sainte-Croix =

Commune in Occitanie, France

- Commune
- Location of Mauvezin-de-Sainte-Croix
- Location within France Location within Occitanie
- Coordinates: 43°04′47″N 1°13′45″E
- Country: France
- Region: Occitania
- Department: Ariège
- Arrondissement: Saint-Girons
- Canton: Portes du Couserans

Government
  - Mayor (2020–2026): Patricia Jean-Nouvelle
- Area^{1}: 5.2 km^{2} (2.0 sq mi)
- Elevation: 506 m (1,660 ft)
- Highest elevation: 693 m (2,274 ft)
- Lowest elevation: 387 m (1,270 ft)
- Population (2023): 52
  - Density: 10/km^{2} (26/sq mi)
- Time zone: UTC+01:00 (CET)
  - Summer (DST): UTC+02:00 (CEST)
- INSEE/Postal code: 09184 /09230
- ^{1} French Land Register data, which excludes lakes, ponds, glaciers > 1 km^{2} (0.386 sq mi or 247 acres) and river estuaries.

Mauvezin-de-Sainte-Croix (French pronunciation: [mov(ə)zɛ̃ də sɛ̃t kʁwa]; Occitan: Mauvesin de Senta Crotz) is a commune in the Ariège department in southwestern France.

== Population ==
Historical population
Year	Pop.	±% p.a.
1968	46	—
1975	49	+0.91%
1982	55	+1.66%
1990	45	−2.48%
1999	48	+0.72%
2007	43	−1.37%
2012	40	−1.44%
2017	36	−2.09%
2023	52	+6.32%
Source: INSEE

== See also ==
- Communes of the Ariège department
