= Fabas, Ariège =

Commune in Occitanie, France

Fabas
- Commune
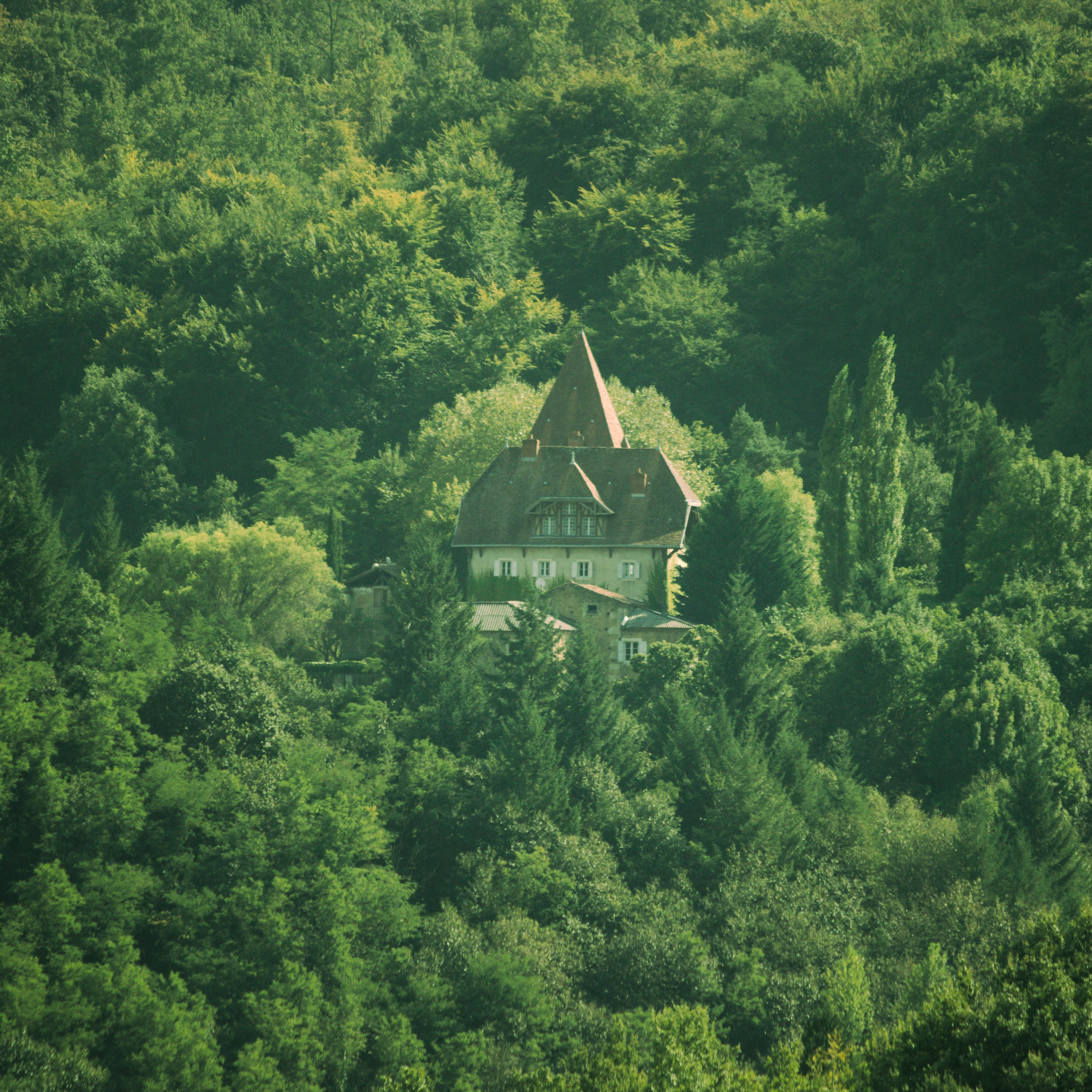
- The Chateau of Poudelay, in Fabas
- Location of Fabas
- Location within France Location within Occitanie
- Coordinates: 43°06′32″N 1°06′24″E
- Country: France
- Region: Occitania
- Department: Ariège
- Arrondissement: Saint-Girons
- Canton: Portes du Couserans
- Intercommunality: Couserans-Pyrénées

Government
  - Mayor (2020–2026): Jean-Pierre Saint-Germes
- Area^{1}: 23.04 km^{2} (8.90 sq mi)
- Elevation: 400 m (1,300 ft)
- Highest elevation: 560 m (1,840 ft)
- Lowest elevation: 288 m (945 ft)
- Population (2023): 354
  - Density: 15.4/km^{2} (39.8/sq mi)
- Time zone: UTC+01:00 (CET)
  - Summer (DST): UTC+02:00 (CEST)
- INSEE/Postal code: 09120 /09230
- ^{1} French Land Register data, which excludes lakes, ponds, glaciers > 1 km^{2} (0.386 sq mi or 247 acres) and river estuaries.

Fabas is a commune in the Ariège department in southwestern France.

== Population ==
Historical population
Year	Pop.	±% p.a.
1968	268	—
1975	310	+2.10%
1982	336	+1.16%
1990	327	−0.34%
1999	306	−0.73%
2007	318	+0.48%
2012	338	+1.23%
2017	351	+0.76%
2023	354	+0.14%
Source: INSEE

== See also ==
- Communes of the Ariège department
