= Betchat =

Commune in Occitanie, France

- Commune
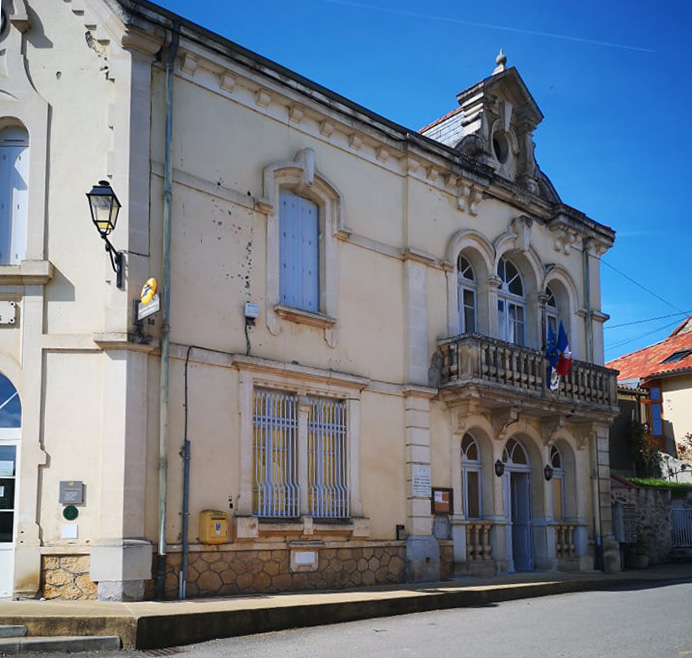
- Town hall
- Location of Betchat
- Location within France Location within Occitanie
- Coordinates: 43°05′35″N 1°00′46″E
- Country: France
- Region: Occitania
- Department: Ariège
- Arrondissement: Saint-Girons
- Canton: Portes du Couserans
- Intercommunality: Couserans-Pyrénées

Government
  - Mayor (2020–2026): Patrick Galy
- Area^{1}: 22 km^{2} (8.5 sq mi)
- Elevation: 431 m (1,414 ft)
- Highest elevation: 491 m (1,611 ft)
- Lowest elevation: 296 m (971 ft)
- Population (2023): 355
  - Density: 16/km^{2} (42/sq mi)
- Time zone: UTC+01:00 (CET)
  - Summer (DST): UTC+02:00 (CEST)
- INSEE/Postal code: 09054 /09160
- ^{1} French Land Register data, which excludes lakes, ponds, glaciers > 1 km^{2} (0.386 sq mi or 247 acres) and river estuaries.

Betchat (French pronunciation: [bɛtʃat]; Occitan: Bèthhag) is a commune in the Ariège department of southwestern France.

== Population ==
Historical population
| Year | Pop. | ±% p.a. |
|---|---|---|
| 1968 | 418 | — |
| 1975 | 386 | −1.13% |
| 1982 | 307 | −3.22% |
| 1990 | 314 | +0.28% |
| 1999 | 293 | −0.77% |
| 2007 | 356 | +2.46% |
| 2012 | 334 | −1.27% |
| 2017 | 333 | −0.06% |
| 2023 | 355 | +1.07% |
Source: INSEE

Inhabitants of Betchat are called Betchatois in French.

== See also ==
- Communes of the Ariège department
