= Lacave, Ariège =

Commune in Occitanie, France

Lacave
- Commune
- Location of Lacave
- Location within France Location within Occitanie
- Coordinates: 43°02′27″N 0°59′53″E
- Country: France
- Region: Occitania
- Department: Ariège
- Arrondissement: Saint-Girons
- Canton: Portes du Couserans

Government
  - Mayor (2020–2026): Stéphane Garnier
- Area^{1}: 4.5 km^{2} (1.7 sq mi)
- Elevation: 325 m (1,066 ft)
- Highest elevation: 466 m (1,529 ft)
- Lowest elevation: 318 m (1,043 ft)
- Population (2023): 128
  - Density: 28/km^{2} (74/sq mi)
- Time zone: UTC+01:00 (CET)
  - Summer (DST): UTC+02:00 (CEST)
- INSEE/Postal code: 09148 /09160
- ^{1} French Land Register data, which excludes lakes, ponds, glaciers > 1 km^{2} (0.386 sq mi or 247 acres) and river estuaries.

Lacave (French pronunciation: [lakav]; Occitan: Era Cava) is a commune in the Ariège department in southwestern France.

== Population ==
Historical population
Year	Pop.	±% p.a.
1968	135	—
1975	123	−1.32%
1982	148	+2.68%
1990	109	−3.75%
1999	116	+0.69%
2007	118	+0.21%
2012	130	+1.96%
2017	145	+2.21%
2023	128	−2.06%
Source: INSEE

== See also ==
- Communes of the Ariège department
