= Castagnède, Haute-Garonne =

Castagnède
- Commune
- Location of Castagnède
- Location within France Location within Occitanie
- Coordinates: 43°03′17″N 0°58′47″E
- Country: France
- Region: Occitania
- Department: Haute-Garonne
- Arrondissement: Saint-Gaudens
- Canton: Bagnères-de-Luchon
- Intercommunality: Cagire Garonne Salat

Government
  - Mayor (2020–2026): Martine Canal
- Area^{1}: 3.32 km^{2} (1.28 sq mi)
- Elevation: 330 m (1,080 ft)
- Highest elevation: 442 m (1,450 ft)
- Lowest elevation: 312 m (1,024 ft)
- Population (2023): 172
  - Density: 51.8/km^{2} (134/sq mi)
- Time zone: UTC+01:00 (CET)
  - Summer (DST): UTC+02:00 (CEST)
- INSEE/Postal code: 31112 /31260
- ^{1} French Land Register data, which excludes lakes, ponds, glaciers > 1 km^{2} (0.386 sq mi or 247 acres) and river estuaries.

Castagnède (French pronunciation: [kastaɲɛd]; Occitan: Castanheda) is a commune in the Haute-Garonne department in southwestern France.

== Population ==
Historical population
Year	Pop.	±% p.a.
1968	198	—
1975	210	+0.84%
1982	183	−1.95%
1990	175	−0.56%
1999	185	+0.62%
2007	175	−0.69%
2012	180	+0.57%
2017	189	+0.98%
2023	172	−1.56%
Source: INSEE

== See also ==
- Communes of the Haute-Garonne department
