= Marliac =

- Commune
- Location of Marliac
- Location within France Location within Occitanie
- Coordinates: 43°13′42″N 1°28′33″E
- Country: France
- Region: Occitania
- Department: Haute-Garonne
- Arrondissement: Muret
- Canton: Auterive

Government
  - Mayor (2020–2026): Pierre-Yves Caillat
- Area^{1}: 7.2 km^{2} (2.8 sq mi)
- Elevation: 260 m (850 ft)
- Highest elevation: 369 m (1,211 ft)
- Lowest elevation: 250 m (820 ft)
- Population (2023): 129
  - Density: 18/km^{2} (46/sq mi)
- Time zone: UTC+01:00 (CET)
  - Summer (DST): UTC+02:00 (CEST)
- INSEE/Postal code: 31319 /31550
- ^{1} French Land Register data, which excludes lakes, ponds, glaciers > 1 km^{2} (0.386 sq mi or 247 acres) and river estuaries.

Marliac (French pronunciation: [maʁljak]; Occitan: Marlhac) is a commune in the Haute-Garonne department in southwestern France.

== Geography ==
The commune is bordered by six communes, one in Haute-Garonne, and five in Ariège: Gaillac-Toulza to the northwest, and finally by the department of Ariège to the northeast, east, southeast, south, and southwest by the communes of Canté, Brie, Justiniac, Durfort, and Villeneuve-du-Latou.

== Population ==
Historical population
Year	Pop.	±% p.a.
1968	108	—
1975	80	−4.20%
1982	85	+0.87%
1990	79	−0.91%
1999	108	+3.54%
2007	95	−1.59%
2012	124	+5.47%
2017	145	+3.18%
2023	129	−1.93%
Source: INSEE

== See also ==
- Communes of the Haute-Garonne department
