= Gaillac-Toulza =

- Commune
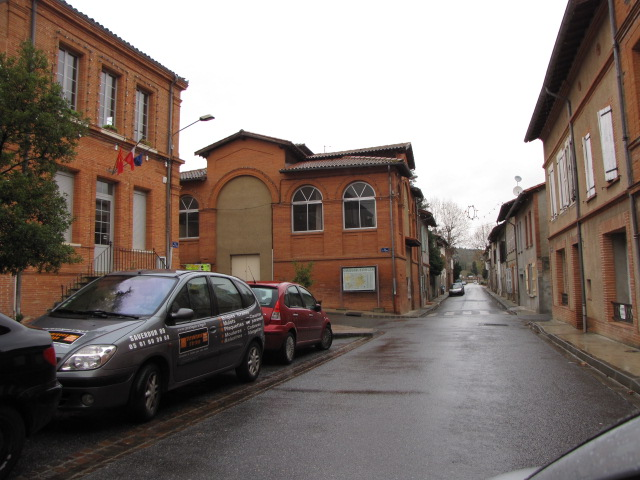
- Town hall

- Coat of arms
- Location of Gaillac-Toulza
- Location within France Location within Occitanie
- Coordinates: 43°15′20″N 1°28′18″E
- Country: France
- Region: Occitania
- Department: Haute-Garonne
- Arrondissement: Muret
- Canton: Auterive

Government
  - Mayor (2020–2026): Hubert Mesplié
- Area^{1}: 40.4 km^{2} (15.6 sq mi)
- Elevation: 225 m (738 ft)
- Highest elevation: 360 m (1,180 ft)
- Lowest elevation: 206 m (676 ft)
- Population (2023): 1,342
  - Density: 33.2/km^{2} (86.0/sq mi)
- Time zone: UTC+01:00 (CET)
  - Summer (DST): UTC+02:00 (CEST)
- INSEE/Postal code: 31206 /31550
- ^{1} French Land Register data, which excludes lakes, ponds, glaciers > 1 km^{2} (0.386 sq mi or 247 acres) and river estuaries.

Gaillac-Toulza (French pronunciation: [ɡajak tulza]; Occitan: Galhac Tolzan) is a commune in the Haute-Garonne department in southwestern France.

== Geography ==
The commune is bordered by eleven other communes, four of them is in Haute-Garonne, and seven of them is in Ariège: Caujac to the north, Cintegabelle to the northeast, Esperce to the northwest, and finally by the department of Ariège by the communes of Saint-Quirc to the northwest, Lissac and Labatut to the east, Canté to the east, Villeneuve-du-Latou to the southwest, Saint-Ybars to the west, and finally by Lézat-sur-Lèze to the northwest.

== Population ==
Historical population
Year	Pop.	±% p.a.
1968	747	—
1975	658	−1.80%
1982	610	−1.08%
1990	770	+2.95%
1999	910	+1.87%
2007	1,140	+2.86%
2012	1,244	+1.76%
2017	1,265	+0.34%
2023	1,342	+0.99%
Source: INSEE

== See also ==
- Communes of the Haute-Garonne department
