= Cintegabelle =

Cintegabelle Senta Gabèla (Occitan)
- Commune
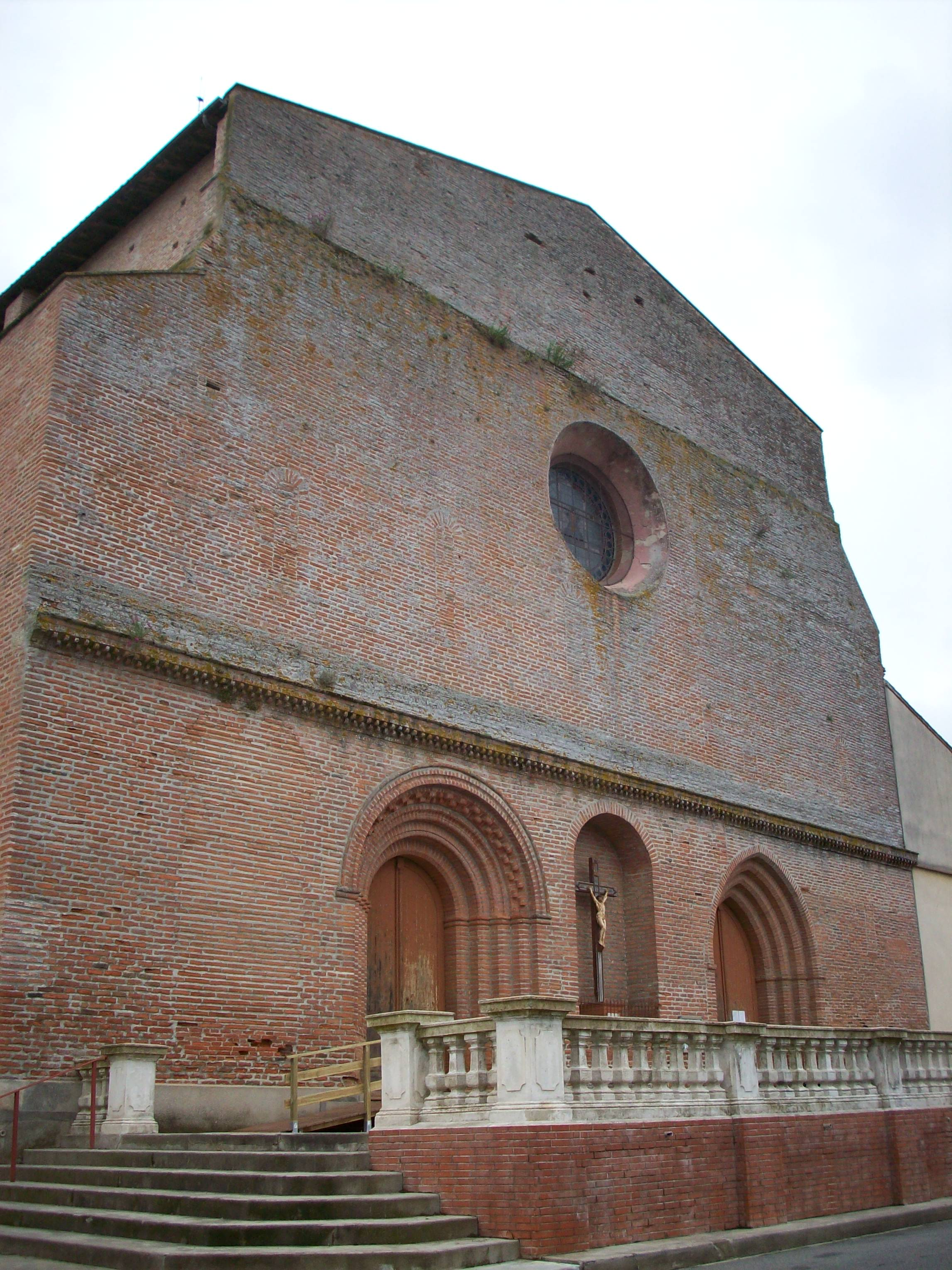
- The church in Cintegabelle

- Coat of arms
- Location of Cintegabelle
- Location within France Location within Occitanie
- Coordinates: 43°18′49″N 1°31′53″E
- Country: France
- Region: Occitania
- Department: Haute-Garonne
- Arrondissement: Muret
- Canton: Auterive

Government
  - Mayor (2022–2026): Monique Courbieres
- Area^{1}: 52.92 km^{2} (20.43 sq mi)
- Elevation: 247 m (810 ft)
- Highest elevation: 302 m (991 ft)
- Lowest elevation: 185 m (607 ft)
- Population (2023): 3,006
  - Density: 56.80/km^{2} (147.1/sq mi)
- Time zone: UTC+01:00 (CET)
  - Summer (DST): UTC+02:00 (CEST)
- INSEE/Postal code: 31145 /31550
- ^{1} French Land Register data, which excludes lakes, ponds, glaciers > 1 km^{2} (0.386 sq mi or 247 acres) and river estuaries.

Cintegabelle (French pronunciation: [sɛ̃tɡabɛl]; Occitan: Senta Gabèla, Occitan pronunciation: ['sentɔ ga'βɛlɔ]) is a commune in the Haute-Garonne department in southwestern France. Historically and culturally, the commune is in the Aganaguès region or Ariège plain, sometimes called lower Ariège, or Ariège foothills.

Exposed to an altered oceanic climate, it is mainly drained by the Ariège River and its tributary, the Hers, which flows into the Ariège within its boundaries. Various small rivers irrigate the commune, such as the Galage, the Jade, the Calers stream, the Aure de Canté, the Cornus stream, and the Palanquelle stream. The commune boasts a remarkable natural heritage: a Natura 2000 site ("Garonne, Ariège, Hers, Salat, Pique, and Neste"), a protected area ("Garonne, Ariège, Hers Vif, and Salat"), and six natural areas of ecological, faunal, and floristic interest.

Cintegabelle is a rural commune with 2,994 inhabitants in 2022, having experienced a significant population increase since 1975. It is part of the Toulouse catchment area. Its inhabitants are called Cintegabellois (French pronunciation: [sɛ̃tɡabɛlwa]) or Cintegabelloises (French pronunciation: [sɛ̃tɡabɛlwaz]).

The town's architectural heritage includes four buildings protected as historic monuments: the Bouyssou Dovecote, listed in 1946; Boulbonne Abbey, listed in 1981; Notre-Dame Church, listed in 1984; and Secourieu Park, listed in 1988.

== Etymology ==
The earliest known attestation of this name is the ipse alode de Sancta Gabella in the will of Hugh, Bishop of Toulouse (960). Devic and Vaissete, in their Histoire générale de Languedoc, even specify that Hugh had given one of his clerics, named Loup, the church of Sainte-Marie where the body of Saint Gabella was buried. They add, however, that nothing is known for certain about this saint.

In the current state of knowledge, it must be considered a hagiotoponym, but this saint appears nowhere other than in the work of Devic and Vaissete, who, moreover, cast doubt on her existence. She is most likely a saint imagined by the inhabitants of the region based on a common name. In the Middle Ages, in fact, proper names were attributed magical virtues. This is how the name of a saint was modified to make them the healer of an illness.

Dauzat and his successors linked this toponym to the gabela, "salt tax." However, this name is only attested in French from 1330 onward, and probably later in Occitan. It is therefore better to refer to the Occitan gavèla, "sheaf of wheat." The Occitan cincta is a remotivation, based on a pronunciation *sinta, a variant of santa/senta, as it only appears in the 16th century, nearly 300 years after the attestations with Santa/Sancta.

== Geography ==
The commune of Cintegabelle is located in the Haute-Garonne department, in the Occitanie region.

It is 33 km as the crow flies from Toulouse, the departmental prefecture, 23 km from Muret, the sub-prefecture, and 6 km from Auterive, the central office of the canton of Auterive, which has been the commune's administrative center for departmental elections since 2015. The commune is also part of the Auterive catchment area.

The nearest communes are: Saint-Quirc (4.7 km), Aignes (4.8 km), Mauvaisin (4.9 km), Lissac (5.1 km), Caujac (5.3 km), Labatut (5.8 km), Grazac (6.1 km), and Auterive (6.1 km).

Historically and culturally, Cintegabelle is part of the Aganaguès region or Ariège plain, sometimes called the lower Ariège or Ariège foothills. This region, whose origins probably date back to the Carolingian period, encompasses the Pamiers plain and, by extension, the Saverdun plain.

Cintegabelle borders ten other communes, five of which are in the Ariège department.

=== Geology and relief ===
The area of the commune is 5,292 hectares, making it the fourth largest area in Haute-Garonne; its altitude varies from 185 to 302 meters.

=== Hydrology ===
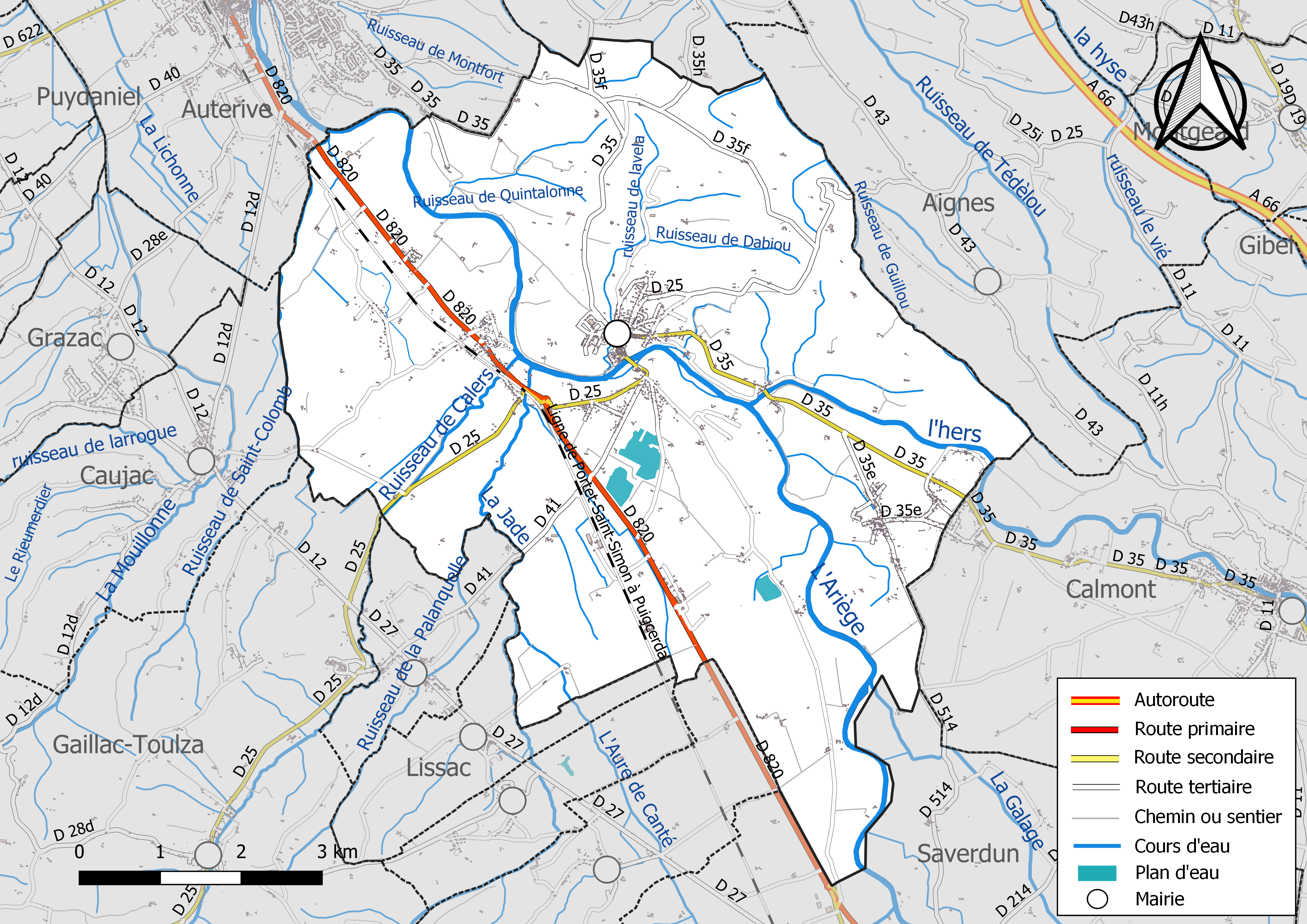
Hydrographic and road networks of Cintegabelle.

The commune is in the Garonne basin, within the Adour-Garonne hydrographic basin. It is drained by the Ariège, the Grand Hers, the Galage, the Jade, the Ruisseau de Calers, the Aure de Canté, the Cornus stream, the Palanquelle stream, the Saint-Colomb stream, a branch of the Ariège, Rec de la Garenne de Daban, the Blandin stream, the Dabiou stream, constituting a hydrographic network of 70 km in total length.

=== Climate ===
In 2010, the commune's climate was classified as a Southwest Basin climate, according to a study based on a series of data covering the period 1971–2000. In 2020, Météo-France published a typology of climates in metropolitan France, in which the commune is exposed to an altered oceanic climate and is located in the Aquitaine-Gascon climate region, characterized by abundant rainfall in spring and moderate rainfall in autumn, low sunshine in spring, hot summers (19.5°C), light winds, frequent fog in autumn and winter, and frequent thunderstorms in summer (15 to 20 days).

For the period 1971–2000, the average annual temperature was 13.1°C, with an annual temperature range of 15.7°C. The average annual cumulative precipitation is 735 mm, with 9.6 days of precipitation in January and 5.6 days in July. For the period 1991-2020, the average annual temperature observed at the nearest weather station, located in the commune of Ségreville 26 km away as the crow flies, is 13.4 °C and the average annual cumulative precipitation is 747.6 mm. For the future, the climatic parameters of the commune estimated for 2050 according to different greenhouse gas emission scenarios can be consulted on a dedicated site published by Météo-France in November 2022.

=== Natural environments and biodiversity ===
==== Protected areas ====
Regulatory protection is the most effective means of intervention to preserve remarkable natural spaces and their associated biodiversity.

The commune has one protected area: the "Garonne, Ariège, Hers Vif, and Salat" rivers, covered by a biotope protection order, covering an area of 1,658.7 hectares.

==== Natura 2002 Network ====
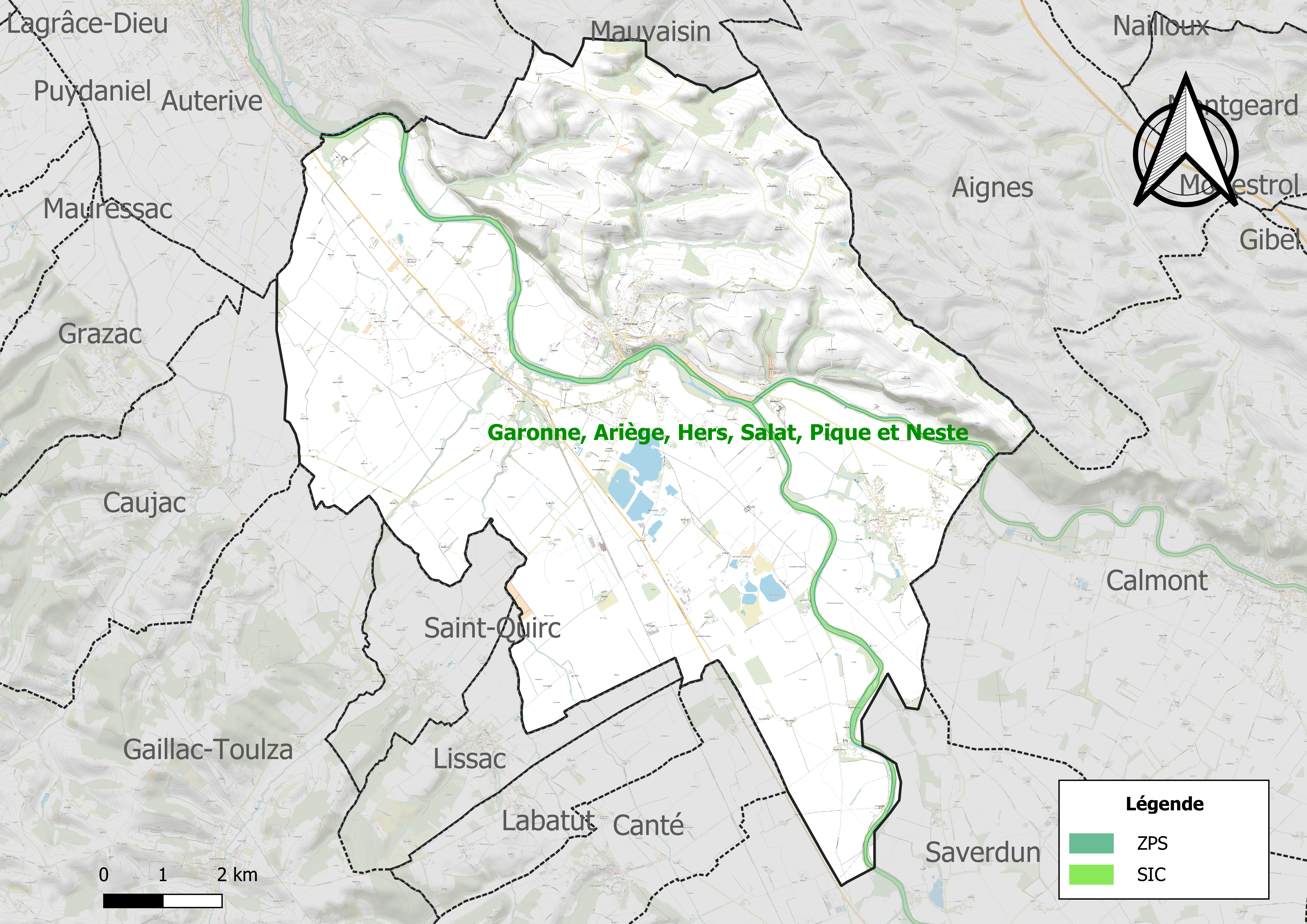
Natura 2000 site in the municipal area.

The Natura 2000 network is a European ecological network of natural sites of ecological interest developed from the habitats and birds directives, consisting of special areas of conservation (SAC) and special protection areas (SPA). A Natura 2000 site has been defined in the commune under the habitats directive: "Garonne, Ariège, Hers, Salat, Pique and Neste", with an area of 9,581 ha, a hydrographic network for migratory fish (active and potential spawning grounds important for salmon in particular which is the subject of regular stocking and whose adults already reach Foix on the Ariège.

==== Natural areas of ecological, faunal and floral interest ====
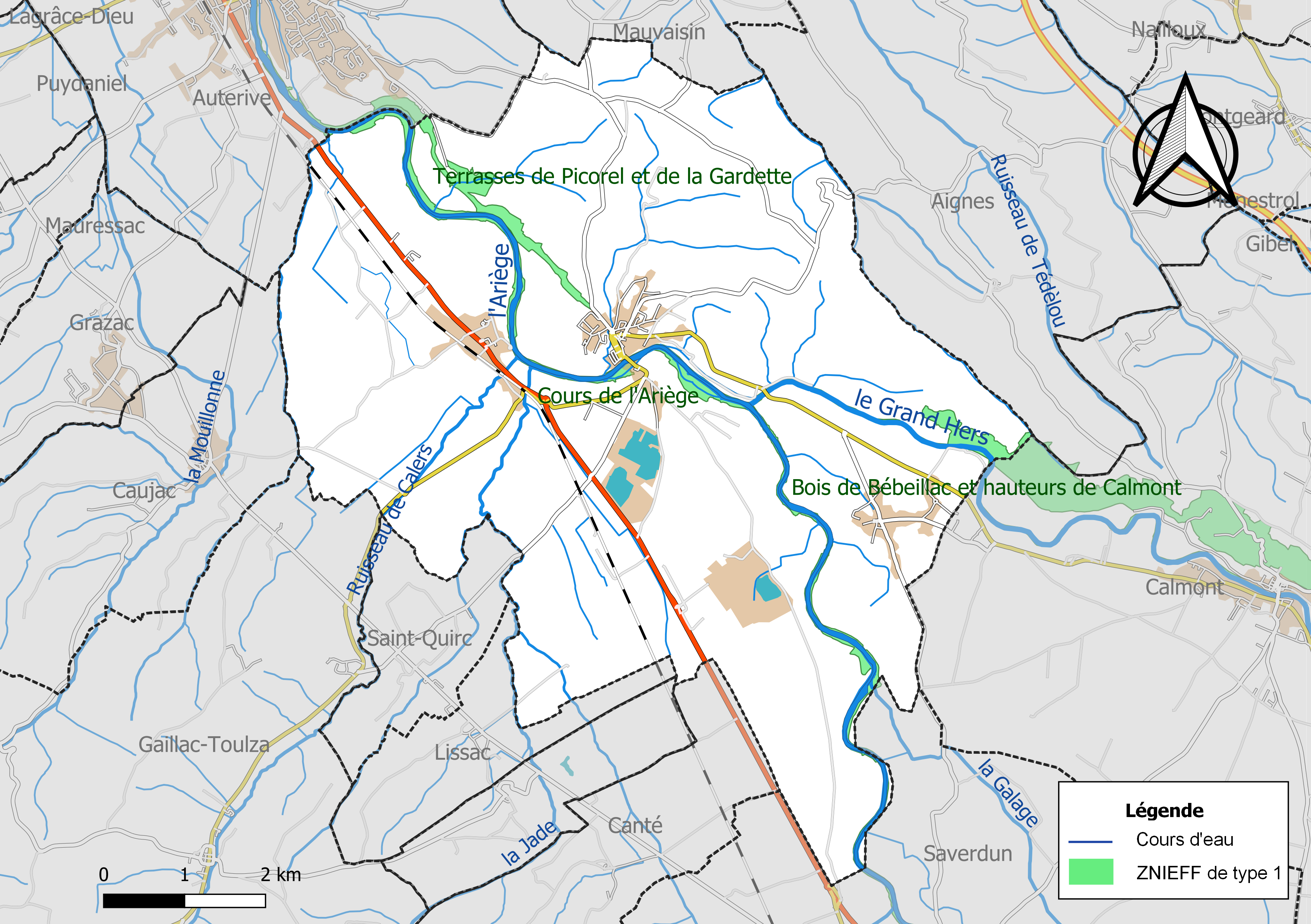
Map of type 1 ZNIEFFs located in the commune.

The inventory of natural areas of ecological, faunal, and floral interest (ZNIEFF) aims to cover the most ecologically interesting areas, primarily with a view to improving knowledge of the national natural heritage and providing various decision-makers with a tool to help them take the environment into account in land use planning. Four type 1 ZNIEFFs are listed in the commune:

- the "Bébeillac woods and Calmont heights" (262 ha), covering four communes, including one in Ariège and three in Haute-Garonne;
- the "Cours de l'Ariège" (1,341 ha), covering 56 communes, including 43 in Ariège and 13 in Haute-Garonne;
- the "Cours de l'Hers" (891 ha), covering 41 communes, including 32 in Ariège, seven in Aude, and two in Haute-Garonne;
- the "Terraces of Picorel and La Gardette" (50 ha), covering two communes in the department;

and two type 2 ZNIEFFs:

- "L'Ariège et riparian forests" (1,975 ha), covering 56 communes, including 43 in Ariège and 13 in Haute-Garonne;
- "L'Hers et riparian forests" (1,417 ha), covering 41 communes, including 32 in Ariège, seven in Aude, and two in Haute-Garonne.

== Urban planning ==
=== Typology ===
As of 1 January 2024, Cintegabelle is categorized as a rural commune with dispersed housing, according to the new seven-level municipal density grid defined by INSEE in 2022. It is located outside an urban unit. Furthermore, the commune is part of the Toulouse catchment area, of which it is a suburban commune. This area, which includes 527 communes, is categorized in areas of 700,000 inhabitants or more (excluding Paris).

=== Land use ===
The land use of the municipality, as shown in the European biophysical land use database Corine Land Cover (CLC), is marked by the importance of agricultural land (87.9% in 2018), a decrease compared to 1990 (90.6%). The detailed breakdown in 2018 is as follows: arable land (82.2%), forests (5.8%), heterogeneous agricultural areas (5.2%), urbanized areas (3.3%), continental waters (1.6%), mines, landfills and construction sites (1.2%), meadows (0.5%). The evolution of the land use of the commune and its infrastructure can be observed on the various cartographic representations of the territory: the Cassini map (18th century), the general staff map (1820-1866) and the IGN maps or aerial photos for the current period (1950 to today).

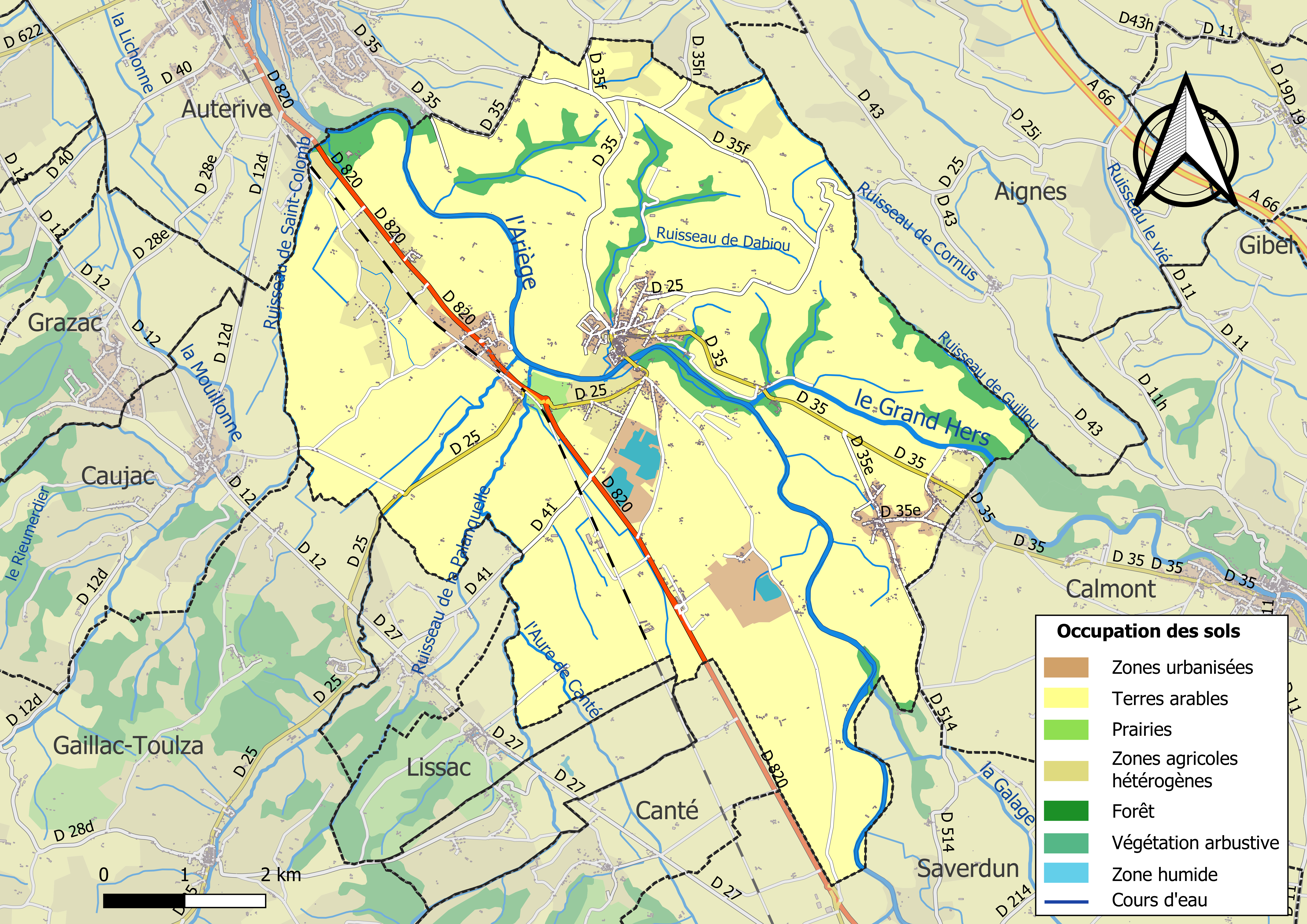
Map of infrastructure and land use in the commune in 2018 (CLC).

=== Place names and differences ===
Former parishes of Les Baccarets and Picarrou.

- Numerous hamlets and localities including Boulbonne (former abbey), Picarrou, Les Baccarets, Le Port and Fantou.

=== Communication routes and transport ===
- By road: former RN 20.
- By plane: Toulouse-Blagnac Airport.

Line 318 of the Arc-en-Ciel network connects Toulouse bus station from the city center.

Cintegabelle station, a train station located in the commune, is served by TER Occitanie trains, mainly connecting Toulouse-Matabiau, Foix, and Latour-de-Carol - Enveitg stations.

=== Major risks ===
The territory of the commune of Cintegabelle is vulnerable to various natural hazards: weather (storms, thunderstorms, snow, extreme cold, heatwaves or drought), floods, ground movements and earthquakes (very low seismicity). It is also exposed to a technological risk, the rupture of a dam. A site published by BRGM allows you to simply and quickly assess the risks of a property located either by its address or by its plot number.

==== Natural risks ====
Certain parts of the municipal territory are likely to be affected by the risk of flooding due to overflowing watercourses, notably the Hers-Vif, the Galage, the Jade and the Calers stream. The municipality has been declared to be in a state of natural disaster due to the damage caused by floods and mudslides that occurred in 1982, 1992, 1994, 1996, 1998, 1999, 2000, 2005, 2009, 2018 and 2022.

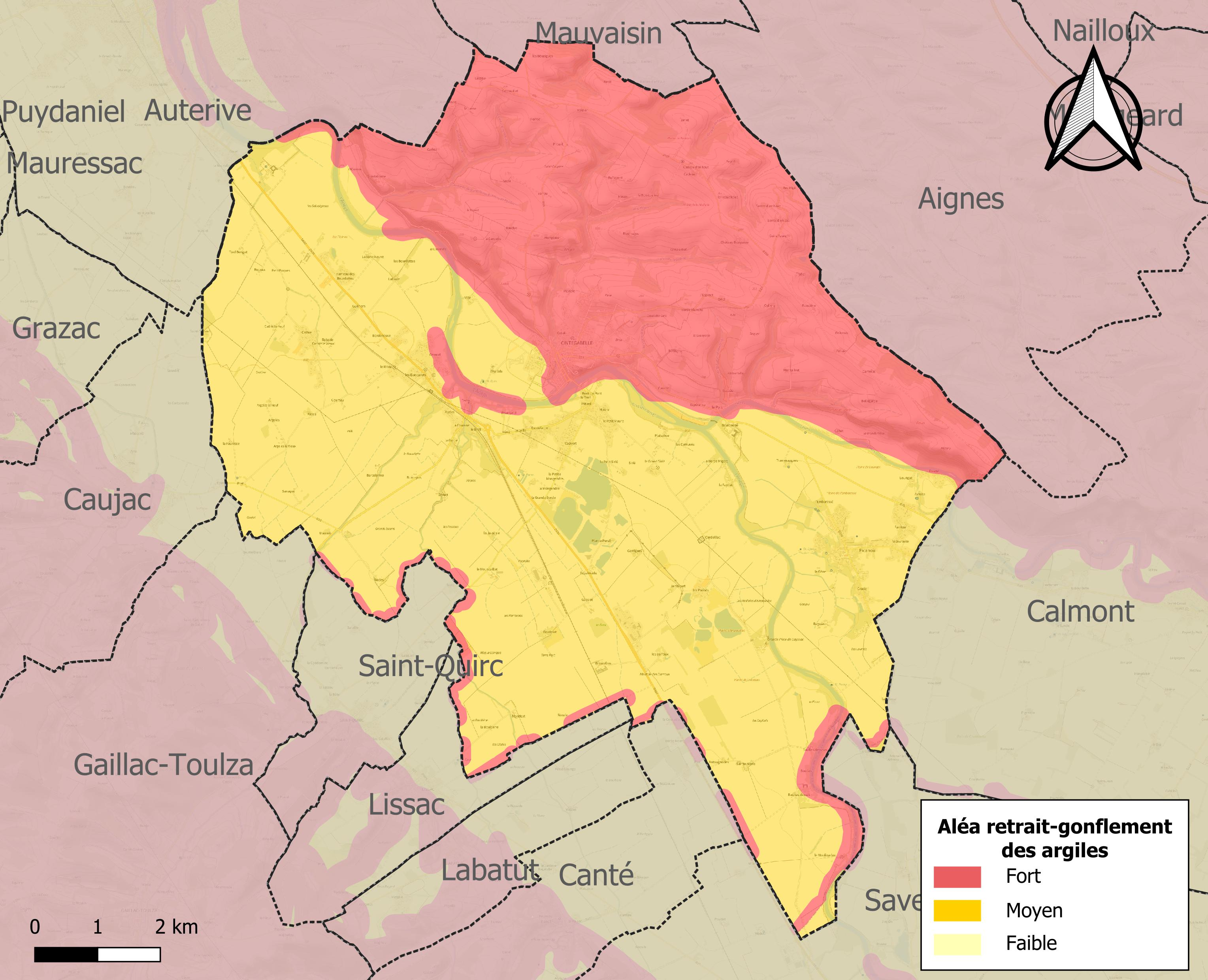
Map of the shrinkage-swelling hazard zones of the clay soils of Cintegabelle.

Cintegabelle is vulnerable to the risk of ground movement, mainly due to the shrinkage and swelling of clay soils. This hazard can cause significant damage to buildings in the event of alternating periods of drought and rain. The entire commune is at medium or high risk (88.8% at the departmental level and 48.5% at the national level). Of the 1,298 buildings counted in the municipality in 2019, 1,298 are at medium or high risk, i.e., 100%, compared to 98% at the departmental level and 54% at the national level. A map of the national territory's exposure to the shrinkage and swelling of clay soils is available on the BRGM website.

Furthermore, to better understand the risk of land subsidence, the national inventory of underground cavities allows us to locate those located in the commune.

Regarding land movements, the commune was recognized as being in a state of natural disaster due to damage caused by drought in 1990, 2003, 2012 and 2017 and by land movements in 1999.

==== Technological risks ====
The municipality is also located downstream from the dams of Montbel (Ariège), Gnioure, Naguilhes (Ariège), Laparan (Ariège) and Soulcem (Ariège). As such, it is likely to be affected by the flood wave following the rupture of one of these structures.

== History ==
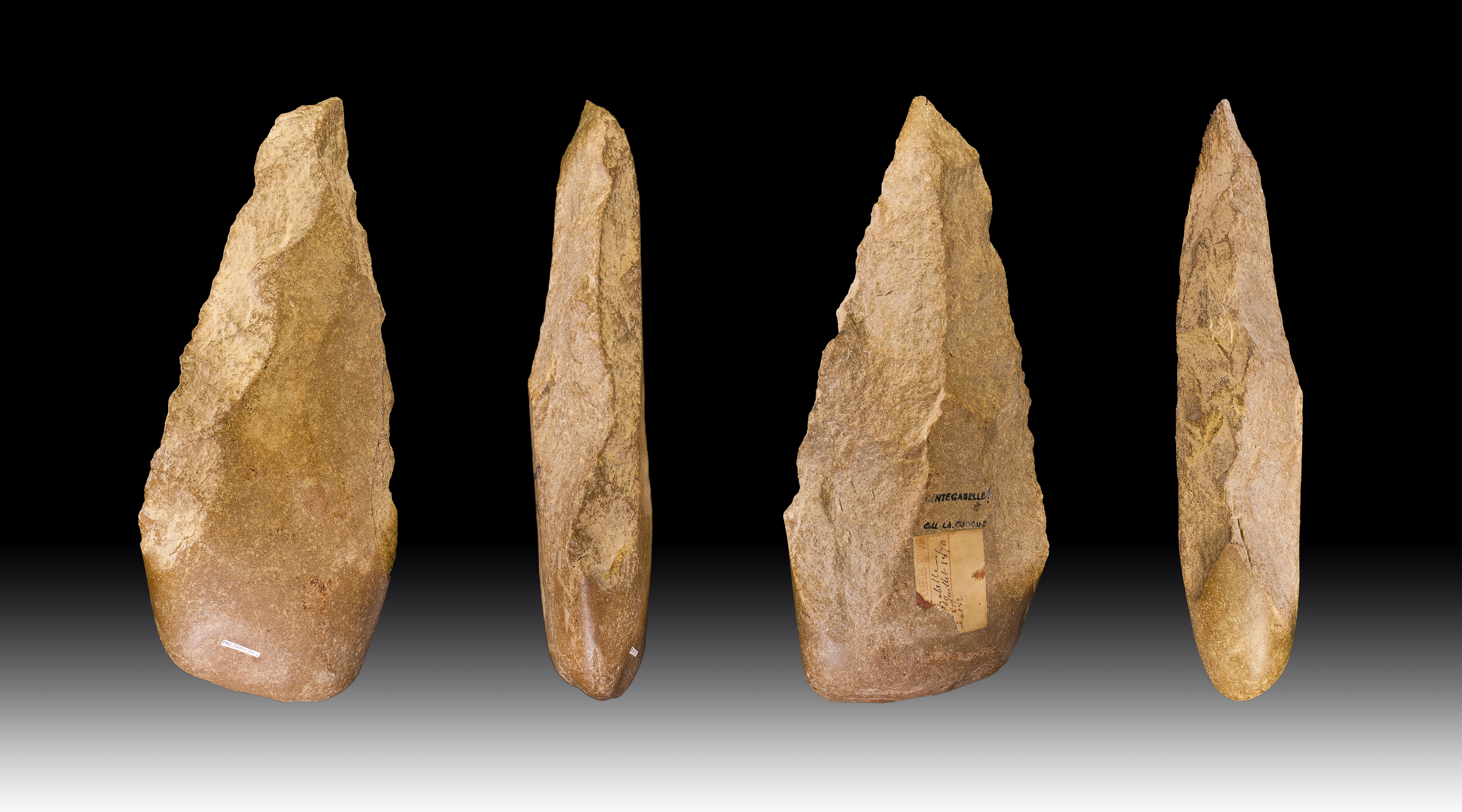
Cintegabelle handaxe - Muséum de Toulouse.

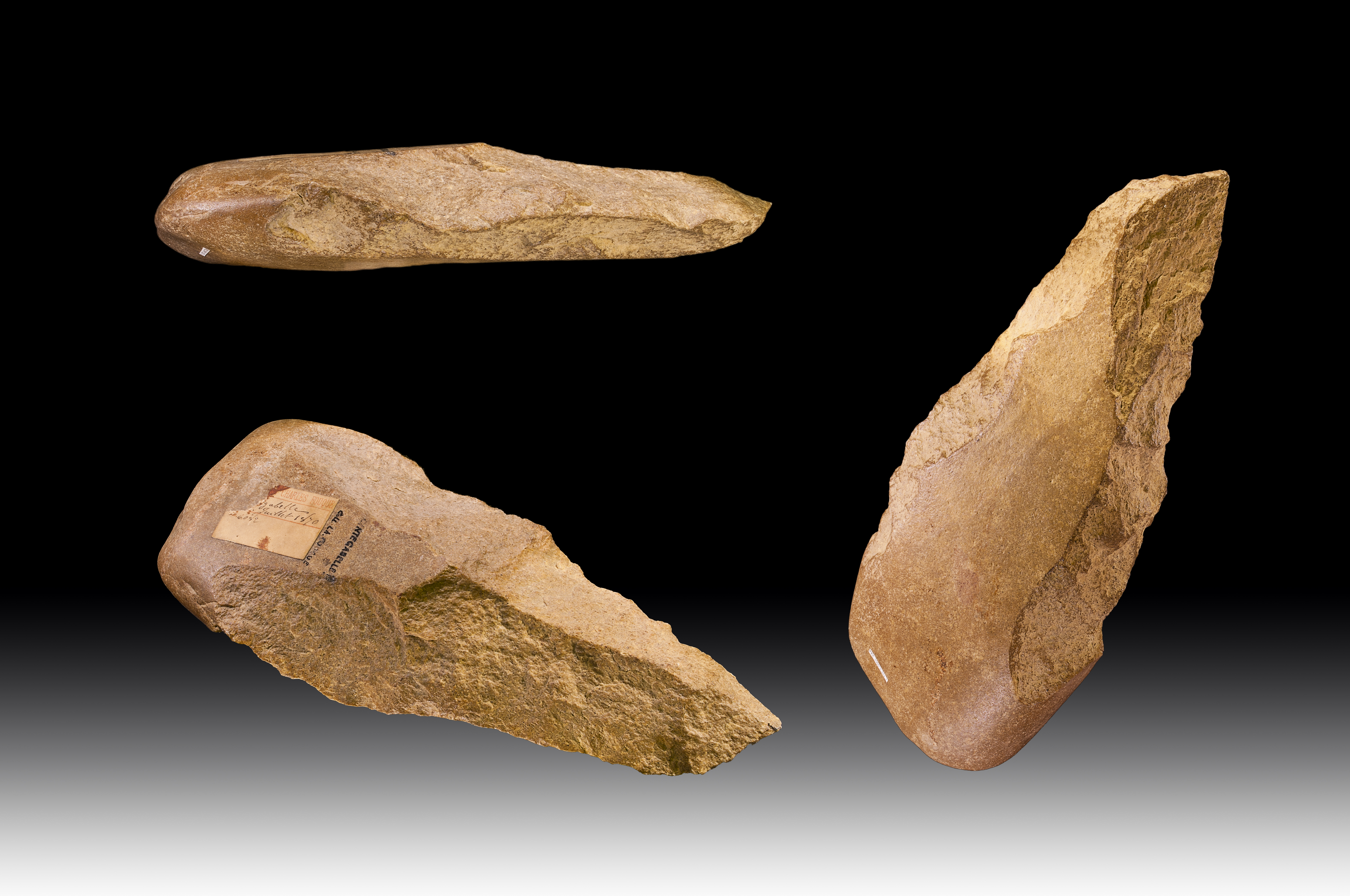
Cintegabelle handaxe - Muséum de Toulouse.
- The commune's territory has been populated since the Lower Paleolithic period.
- The 16th century was Cintegabelle's heyday, thanks to woad. There were as many as twenty-two woad mills.
- On 18 June 1999, an explosion damaged the Cintegabelle tax office and caused damage to nearby houses. The attack was claimed by the Breton Revolutionary Army.

== Politics and administration ==
=== Municipal administration ===
The number of inhabitants in the 2011 census being between 2,500 inhabitants and 3,499 inhabitants in the last census, the number of members of the municipal council is twenty-three.

=== Administrative and electoral affiliations ===
Commune forming part of the seventh constituency of Haute-Garonne, of the community of communes of Bassin Auterivain and of the canton of Auterive (before the departmental redistribution of 2014, Cintegabelle was the capital of the former canton of Cintegabelle).

== Demographics ==
The inhabitants of the commune are called Cintegabellois in French.

Historical population
Year	Pop.	±% p.a.
1968	1,818	—
1975	1,921	+0.79%
1982	2,061	+1.01%
1990	2,215	+0.90%
1999	2,341	+0.62%
2007	2,536	+1.01%
2012	2,696	+1.23%
2017	2,904	+1.50%
2023	3,006	+0.58%
Source: INSEE

=== Education ===
Cintegabelle is part of the Toulouse academy. Education is provided in the commune of Cintegabelle by the nursery, nursery and elementary schools. Since 2012 a Calandreta has offered Franco-Occitan education. A middle school opened in 2021.

=== Health ===
The commune has a community social action center, a solidarity center, nurses, doctors and pharmacy.

=== Cultural events and festivities ===
- Cintegabelle Festival

Every year, Cintegabelle hosts the local festival, organized by the Cintegabelle Festival Committee. This event takes place from Friday evening to Sunday evening, usually the first weekend of September. It offers various activities for all ages, with concerts, rides, convivial meals, and other festive activities designed to bring together locals and visitors.

- Picarrou Terraces Festival

Since 2010, the Picarrou Terraces Festival has been held every other Tuesday in June and July on Place Lucien-Canals in Picarrou. Each of the five free evenings, called "Terraces," addresses a different musical theme and features regional, national, and international artists. The festival's headliners have been Kent and Bombes 2 Bal in 2013, Murray Head in 2014, Bijou and Yves Jamait in 2015, Bill Deraime and Jean-Patrick Capdevielle in 2016, Art Mengo in 2017, Doolin' in 2018, and Michael Jones in 2019. The 11th edition was canceled due to the health situation. More intimate concerts called "Les Terrasses d'Hiver" are regularly held in October, February, and April at the "Le Préau de l'école" venue in Picarrou.

- Baccarets Festival is held every year at the end of August.
- Music schools, choirs, dance, theater, and many other associations are present.

=== Sports activities ===
Hunting, bowling, hiking, rugby union, football, tennis, judo, cycling, and many other spots are present there.

=== Energy transition ===
The commune hosts renewable energy projects that are of structural importance to the entire territory. These projects are in line with the objectives of the Territorial Climate Air Energy Plan (PCAET), a territorial sustainable development project led by the Pays Sud Toulousain.

By the end of 2023, 13.9 MWp (megawatt peak) of renewable electricity generation capacity will be in operation in the commune, based on three ground-mounted photovoltaic installations on uncultivated, non-agricultural municipal land. The first project was inaugurated on 13 April 2019. It is a small solar farm (0.5 ha), with a capacity of 250 kWp (kilowatt peak), led by the Enercoop Midi-Pyrénées cooperative. On 10 May 2022, a second solar farm, led by Neoen, was inaugurated. With a capacity of 4.98 MWp and a surface area of 7.2 hectares, it is also located on the site of the former gravel pit in Cap Vert. On 22 September 2023, Akuo inaugurated its second floating solar power plant in France: with a capacity of 8.7 MWp, the Cintegabelle power plant is located on Lake Cap Vert, a 19-hectare human-affected area submerged following the end of a gravel pit operation.

In addition, a wind power project with a total capacity of 12 MW was authorized by prefectural decree on 22 September 2022 and is expected to begin operating in the commune by 2028. Initiated in 2014, this wind project is unique in that it consists of two companies: Engie Green (three wind turbines), a subsidiary of Engie, and the local civic society Aganaguès (one wind turbine), created in April 2019 by 10 local residents, the association Les Energies d'Aganaguès, Energie Partagée Investissement, and the collective interest cooperative Enercoop Midi-Pyrénées. Winner of the 2018 "Cooperative and Citizen Energy" call for projects from Ademe and the Occitanie Region, Aganaguès is the first civic-minded wind turbine in Haute-Garonne.

Furthermore, a private methanization unit, Biogazd'Oc, has been producing biogas by injection since July 2023.

The municipality of Cintegabelle is therefore doing its part in the energy transition, producing far more than its needs and thus enabling the Toulouse metropolitan area to be supplied with carbon-free energy.

=== Biodiversity ===
At the beginning of 2024, more than 300 trees planted along the banks of the Ariège. On the left bank of the Ariège upstream and downstream of the D25 bridge, the plantings carried out will help to better maintain the banks of the Ariège, bring in younger age classes of trees and combat the japanese knotweed still present downstream of the bridge. The species planned for this location are native species that are part of the Natura 2000 procession such as the field maple or plane, the common ash, the narrow-leaved ash or the european black alder. An orchard of old fruit trees has been planted downstream of the bridge in the upper part. The rest of the plantings mainly concern the crest of the bank with a tree every 8 meters. Isolated trees have also been positioned throughout the site. A shrubby wetland hedge has been planted along the ditch upstream from the bridge.

Along the Lavela stream, from the municipal park to its confluence with the Ariège, enrichment plantings have been carried out in the clearings with native species from the Natura 2000 network (small-leaved lime, norway maple, english oak, wild service tree, etc.).

On the right bank of the Ariège and along the public river domain, to compensate for a lack of riparian vegetation and the absence of riparian forest, enrichment and natural regeneration plantations have been carried out with species from the Natura 2000 procession (Field maple, Norway maple, cpmmon and lxyphyllum osh, black alder, pedunculate and downy oak, wild cherry, wild service tree, small-leaved lime, service tree, etc.). In an edible forest approach, a small communal orchard has been set up in the large clearing downstream from the site.

=== Waste management ===
The collection and treatment of household and similar waste, as well as the protection and enhancement of the environment, are carried out within the framework of the Bassin Auterivain Haut-Garonnais community of communes.

A recycling center has existed in the commune since 1 January 2007.

== Economy ==
=== Income ===
In 2018 (Insee data published in September 2021), Cintegabelle had 1,212 tax households, comprising 2,936 people. The median disposable income per consumption unit is €21,300 (€23,140 in the department). 46% of tax households are taxed (55.3% in the department).

=== Employment ===
In 2018, the population aged 15 to 64 was 1,791, of which 77.2% were active (69.7% employed and 7.6% unemployed) and 22.8% were inactive. Since 2008, the municipal unemployment rate (as defined by the census) for 15-64 year-olds has been lower than that of France and the department.

The commune is part of the Toulouse catchment area, as at least 15% of the active population work in the area. It had 522 jobs in 2018, compared to 542 in 2013 and 476 in 2008. The number of employed people residing in the municipality is 1,258, representing an employment concentration indicator of 41.5% and an employment rate among those aged 15 or over of 59.2%.

Of these 1,258 employed people aged 15 or over, 222 work in the commune, representing 18% of the population. To get to work, 84.2% of residents use a personal or company four-wheeled vehicle, 7.8% use public transport, 3.5% travel by two-wheeler, bicycle, or on foot, and 4.4% do not need transport (working from home).

=== Non-agricultural activities ===
==== Sectors of activity ====
232 establishments were located in Cintegabelle as of 31 December 2019.

The wholesale and retail trade, transport, accommodation and catering sectors are predominant in the commune, representing 20.7% of the total number of establishments in the commune (48 out of the 232 companies located in Cintegabelle), compared to 25.9% at the departmental level.

==== Businesses and commerce ====
The five companies headquartered in the municipality that generated the most revenue in 2020 were:

- CTA Edwin, automotive technical inspection (€163,000);
- Abs Top Etudes - Abs-Te, engineering and technical studies (€126,000);
- Sofipar Hepta, holding company activities (€73,000);
- Regalon Xavier, intermediaries in furniture, household goods, and hardware (€41,000);
- CMC Coaching, business and other management consulting (€33,000).

Agriculture based on cereal cultivation (corn, wheat, etc.) still plays a significant role, but this trend is declining in favor of residential areas linked to the proximity of the Toulouse metropolitan area, since Cintegabelle is located within its urban area. Crafts and retail are well represented there.

=== Agriculture ===
The commune is in "les Vallées", a small agricultural region devoted to mixed farming on the alluvial plains and terraces which extend on either side of the furrows marked by the Garonne and the Ariège. In 2020, the technical-economic orientation of agriculture in the commune is the cultivation of cereals and/or oilseeds.

The number of active farms headquartered in the commune fell from 84 in the 1988 agricultural census to 58 in 2000, then to 39 in 2010 and finally to 39 in 2020, a drop of 54% in 32 years. The same trend is observed at the departmental level, which lost 57% of its farms during this period. The agricultural area used in the commune also decreased, from 3,542 ha in 1988 to 3,320 ha in 2020. At the same time, the average agricultural area used per farm increased, from 42 to 85 ha.

== Transport ==
- Cintegabelle station, on the line from Toulouse to Foix and Latour-de-Carol.

== Culture and local heritage ==
=== Boulbonne Abbey ===
Listed as a Historic Monument in 1981, Boulbonne Abbey dates back to the early 18th century. It should not be confused with the first Boulbonne Abbey, founded in the 12th century and destroyed by the Huguenots in 1567. The abbey, located in the commune of Cintegabelle, was sold during the Revolution, which explains why much of its furnishings can still be found in the parish church. But this is a small fraction of the abbey's wealth, which was enriched by numerous donations from the region's lords.

The abbey church no longer exists, but the facades, the chapter house, the refectory, and part of the cloister remain. Likewise, the dovecotes and stables are still there.

=== Notre-Dame Church ===
The Notre-Dame de Cintegabelle church is an imposing Toulouse brick church, a 15th-century renovation of an older building. It has been listed as a historic monument since 1984.

==== Art objects ====
Many interesting art objects are preserved there:

- Canvases by Jean-Baptiste Despax (1709-1773), who decorated the Carmelite Chapel in Toulouse, which are placed on either side of a Crucifixion (1700) by Jean Simon. These four paintings, placed in the pentagonal choir, have been classified as historical monuments since 1906. Other paintings by Despax are on display: The Vision of Saint Benedict (classified in 1914), The Holy Family (classified in 1908). These paintings come from Boulbonne Abbey, which the revolutionaries had emptied.
- From the same site, the 18th-century pulpit, classified in 1931;
- The extremely rare baptismal font is made of lead and dates from the 13th century. It features decorations on both sides. They were listed as early as 1901;
- A bronze bell dating from 1432 was listed in 1906.

==== The organ ====
The church of Cintegabelle is best known for its organ, whose original construction in 1742 is attributed to Christophe Moucherel. It was restored and completely rebuilt by Jean-François Lépine in 1754. This instrument comes from the Abbey of Boulbonne and was purchased during the French Revolution in 1798 by citizen Jacques Fageadet for 615 francs. Installation of the organ in the church gallery began in 1806 and was not completed until 1819.

The Louis XVI-style organcase itself is a masterpiece, classified as a historic monument in 1906. Its musical cherubs and gilded atlantes are imposing in this building, which was not originally designed to accommodate an instrument of this size.

The instrumental section (which was also classified in 1972) is no less remarkable, with its three manuals and a "French-style" pedalboard, comprising 34 stops. The last restoration (and largely reconstruction, since it involved returning to a classical-style organ, whereas the Cintegabelle organ had been modified numerous times over the years) dates back to 1989.

These organs have already been the subject of a substantial discography. On 28 May 2011, a stamp representing them was released.

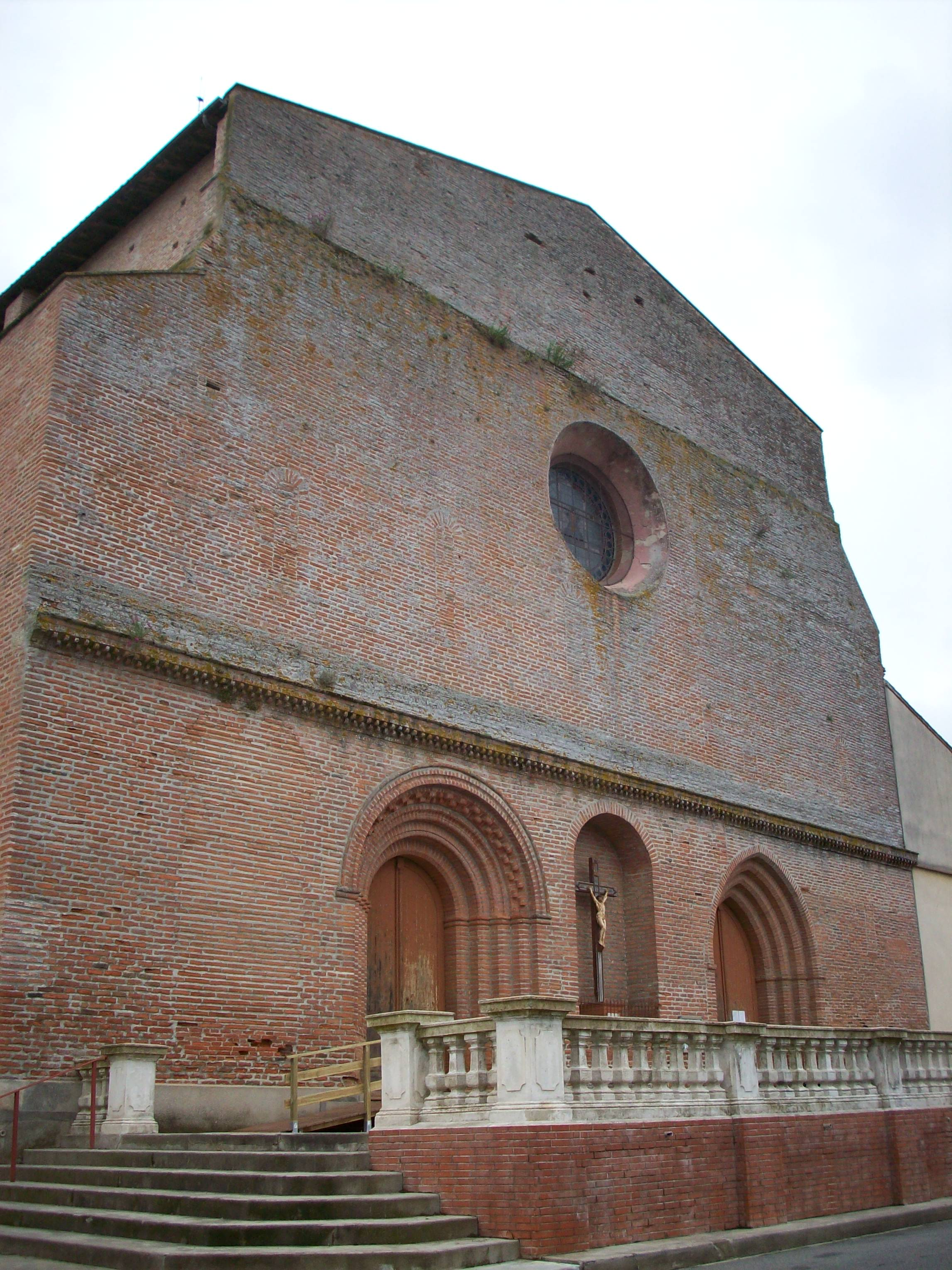
The Church of the Holy Virgin of the Nativity.

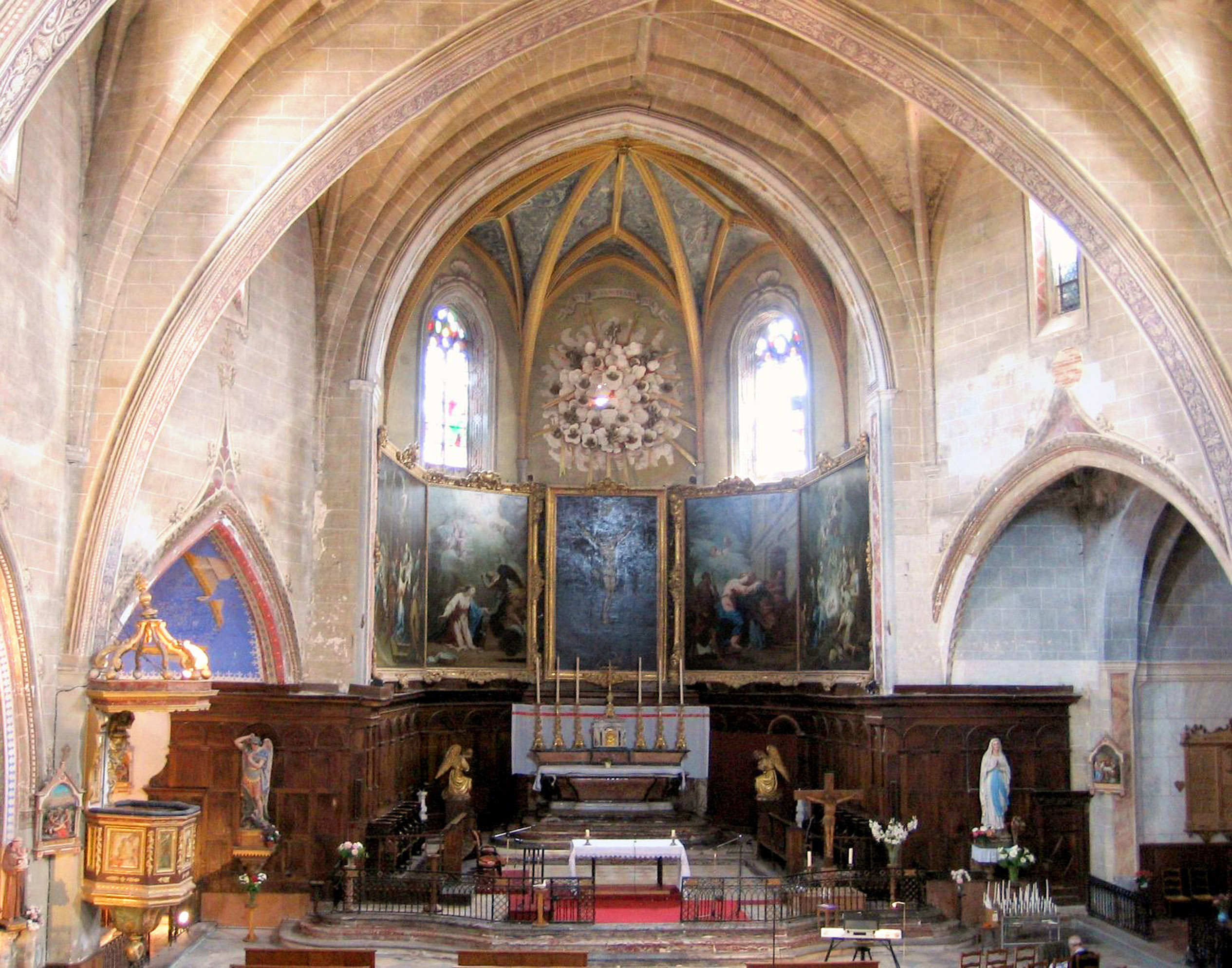
The church choir, with paintings by Jean-Baptiste Despax

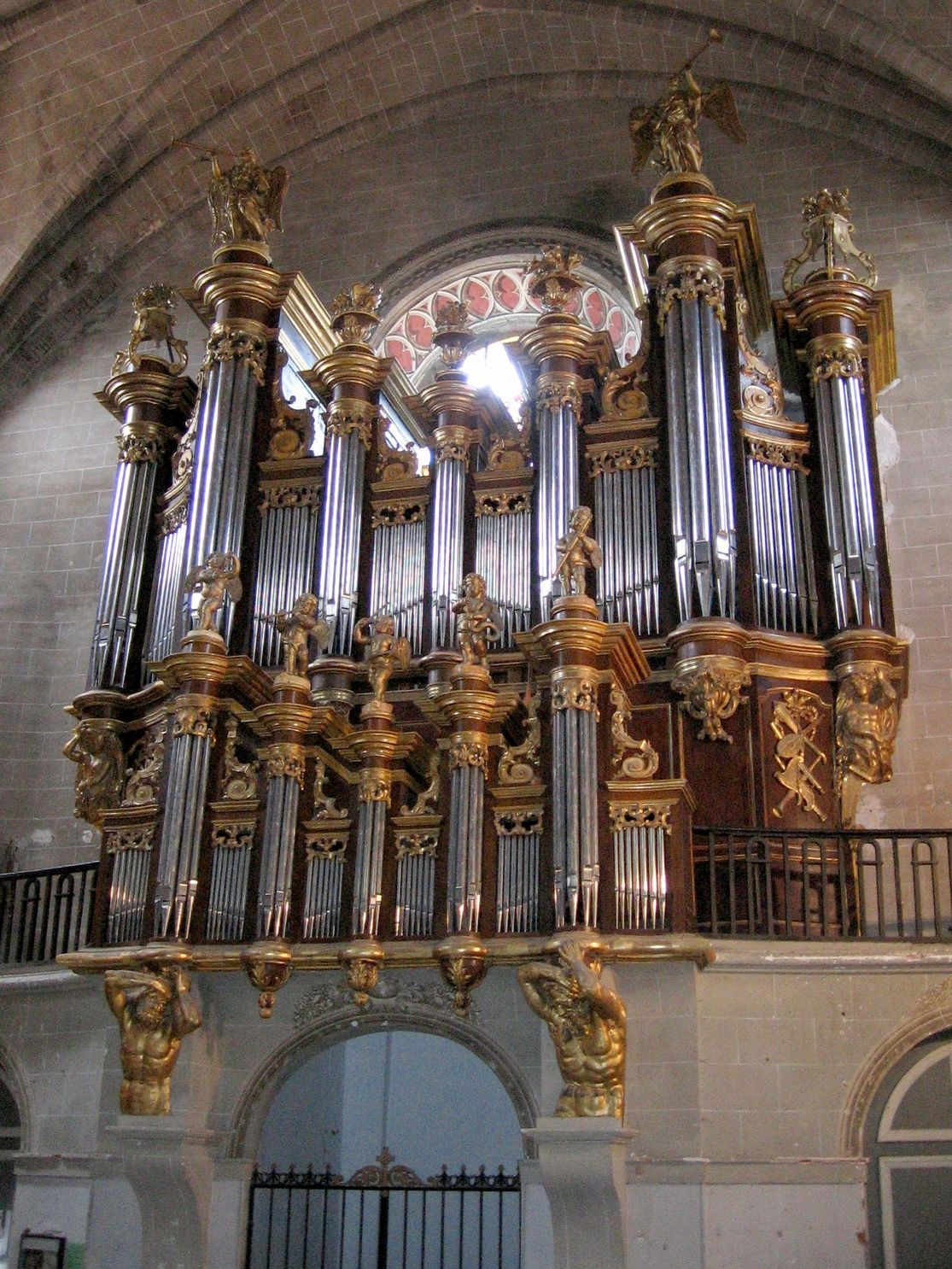
The organ case.

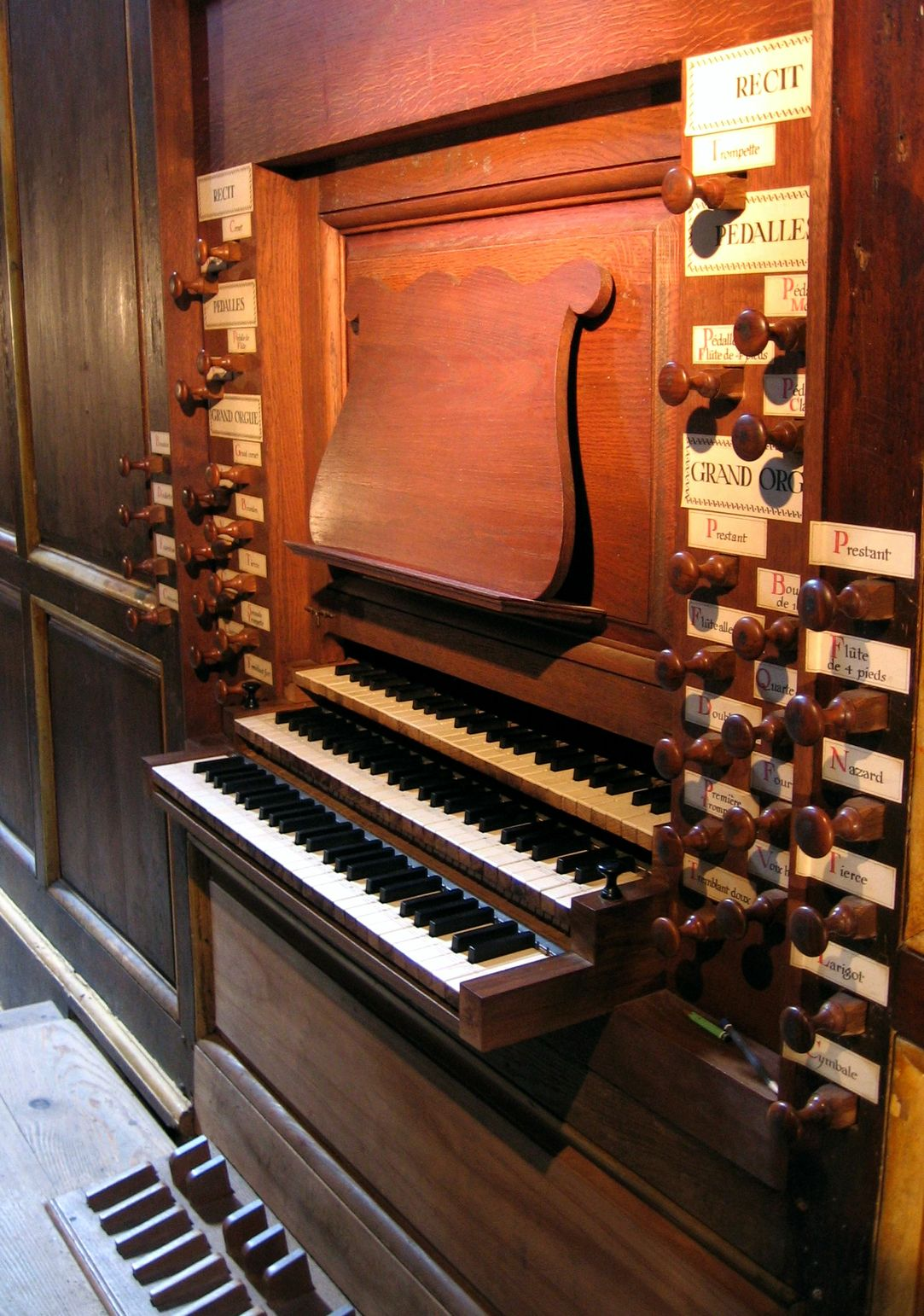
The organ keyboards.

=== Anecdotes ===
The Chevaliers du Fiel quote Cintegabelle in their bawdy song "La Simca 1000": "[...] We went dancing at Kilimanjaro Every two words you belched, But damn you were beautiful Like the town hall of Cintegabelle [...]".

== Heraldry ==
Coat of arms was existed since 16th century.

Arms of Cintegabelle	Azure with a sheaf of wheat or, with a chief sewn gules charged with three stars also or.

== See also ==
- Communes of the Haute-Garonne department

== Bibliography ==
=== For the archaeology concerning Cintegabelle ===
- Cf. Michel Labrousse in Gallia T. XXIV, 1966; Volume XXVI, 1968; Vol. XXVIII, 1970; T. XXX, 1972; Vol. XXXII, 1974; Vol. XXXIV, 1976; Vol. XXXVI, 1978.

Since 16 September 2012, an archaeology exhibition room has been open to visitors. It is located on the first floor of the town hall (opening hours). It traces the history of the first humans to populate the town, from prehistory to the medieval period.

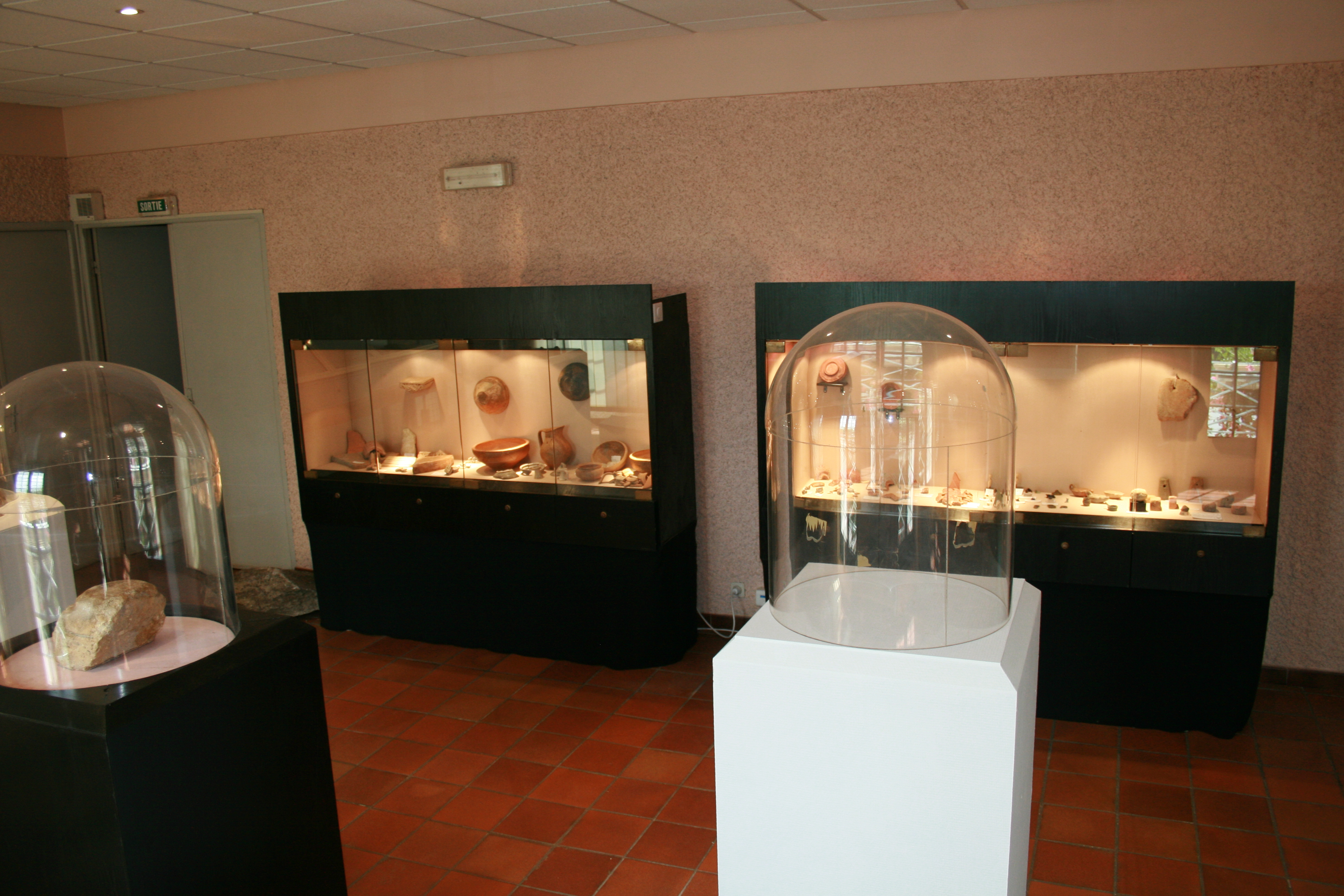
Museum display cases.

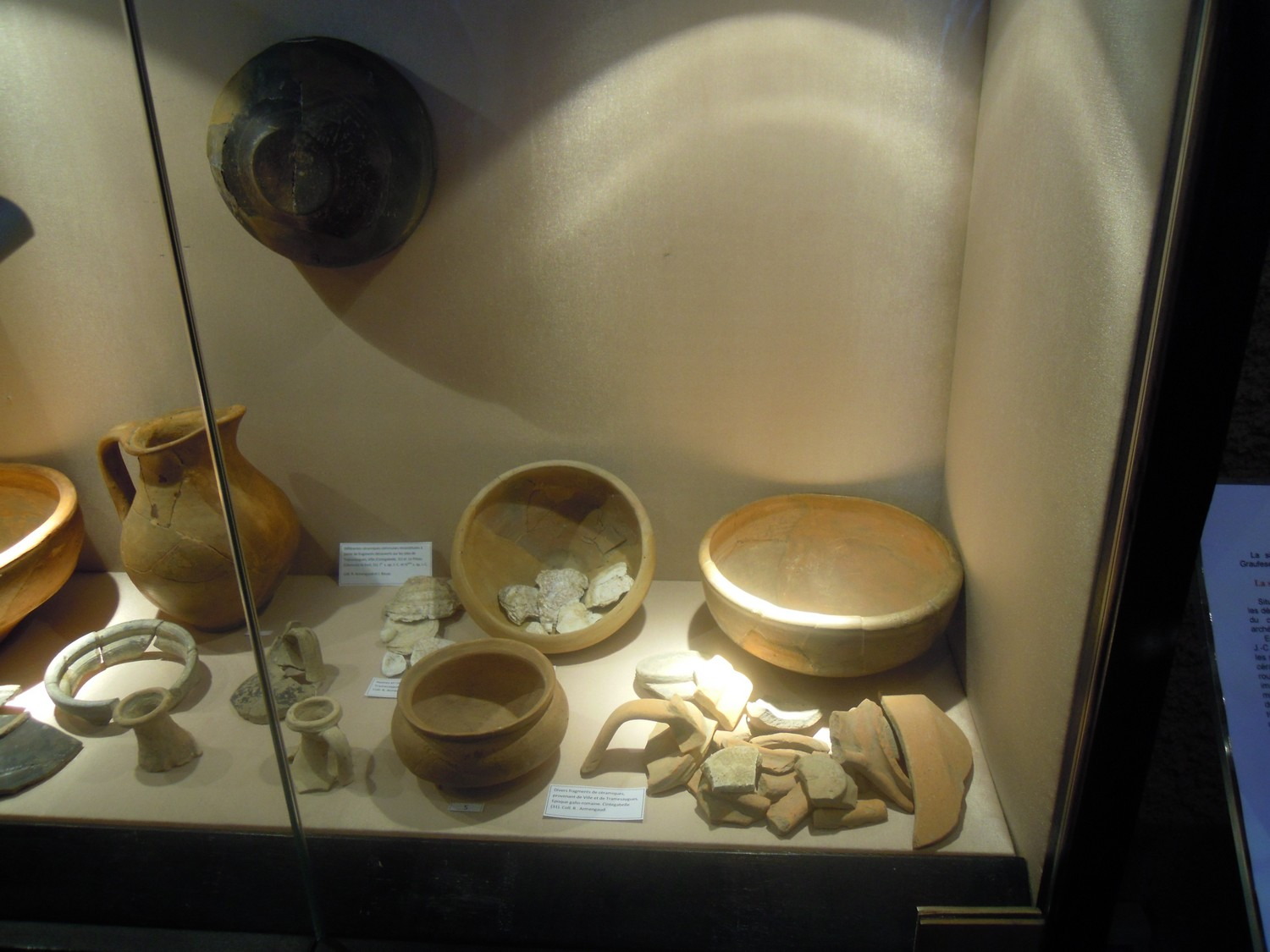
Common ceramics.

=== Works ===
- Armengaud, Roger, Ycart, Roger, Cintegabelle, châtellenie royale en pays toulousain, 1983
- Armengaud, Roger, Boulbonne. Le Saint-Denis des comtes de Foix, Mazères, Édité par l’Association pour le Développement du Tourisme de Mazères, 1993, 328 p.

=== Items ===
- Armengaud, Roger, "Une châtellenie royale en Lauragais : Cintegabelle", Archistra, 1975, n^{o} 16
- Armengaud, Roger, "Ampouillac : une grange de l’Abbaye de Boulbonne", Archistra, 1980, n^{o} 48, 1981, n^{o} 49.
- Armengaud, Roger, "Un terroir du pays toulousain de la colonisation romaine à la guerre des albigeois : Tramesaygues", Bulletin de la Société Ariégeoise Sciences Lettres et Arts, 1981, p. 5-74.
- Armengaud, Roger, "Boulbonne, une abbaye aux frontières des comtés de Foix et du Languedoc (1130-1790)", Revue de Comminges, Pyrénées Centrales, tome XCVII, 1984, p. 193-212.
- Armengaud, Roger, "Un tableau de Jean II Michel peintre des Capitouls", L’Auta, mai 1994, p. 151-152.
- Renoux, Guillaume, « Note épigraphique sur deux inscriptions en occitan à Cintegabelle (Haute-Garonne)», L’Auta, April 2025, p. 142-146.
- Renoux, Guillaume, « L’archéologie à Cintegabelle : Roger Armengaud vingt ans de recherches », L’Auta, 5° série, n°48, October 2013, p. 296-302.
- Renoux, Guillaume, « Une inscription lapidaire inédite du XVIe siècle : de Cintegabelle à Saint-Jacques de Compostelle, des Pères de l’Eglise aux guerres de religion », L'Auta, 2017, p. 65-72.
- Renoux, Guillaume, « Le meurtre du Baron de la tombelle à Cintegabelle en 1873 », Revue du Patrimoine du Muretain, number 24, 2022, p. 129-145.
- Renoux, Guillaume, « Le meurtre d’Ampouillac : les éléments d’une enquête », L’Auta, August-September 2019, p. 273-281.
- Renoux, Guillaume, « L’histoire du bureau de tabac de Cintegabelle : une chanson engagée du XIX~~^{e}~~ siècle », L’Auta, March 2019, p. 115-122.
- Renoux, Guillaume, « L’orgue de Cintegabelle : une histoire séculaire », Bulletin municipal de Cintegabelle, December 2022, p. 9
- Didier Catarina, Quand une abbaye défiait la Province : Boulbonne contre Cintegabelle, une querelle de frontière entre Foix et Languedoc au xviiie siècle, Toulouse, Amis des archives de la Haute-Garonne, coll. « Petite Bibliothèque / supplément à la Lettre des Amis n° 271 » (no 191), 2015, 48 p.
