= La Bastide-de-Lordat =

Commune in Occitanie, France

- Commune
- Coat of arms
- Location of La Bastide-de-Lordat
- Location within France Location within Occitanie
- Coordinates: 43°08′41″N 1°42′48″E
- Country: France
- Region: Occitania
- Department: Ariège
- Arrondissement: Pamiers
- Canton: Portes d'Ariège

Government
  - Mayor (2020–2026): Jacqueline Pagliarino Freyche
- Area^{1}: 5.97 km^{2} (2.31 sq mi)
- Elevation: 300 m (980 ft)
- Highest elevation: 315 m (1,033 ft)
- Lowest elevation: 249 m (817 ft)
- Population (2023): 330
  - Density: 55/km^{2} (140/sq mi)
- Time zone: UTC+01:00 (CET)
  - Summer (DST): UTC+02:00 (CEST)
- INSEE/Postal code: 09040 /09700
- ^{1} French Land Register data, which excludes lakes, ponds, glaciers > 1 km^{2} (0.386 sq mi or 247 acres) and river estuaries.

La Bastide-de-Lordat (French pronunciation: [la bastid də lɔʁda]; Occitan: La Bastida de Lordat) is a commune in the Ariège department in the Occitanie region of south-western France.

== Geography ==
La Bastide-de-Lordat is in the Pamiers urban area some 8 km east by north-east of Pamiers and 5 km north of Les Pujols. Access to the commune is by the D11 road from Pamiers which enters the west of the commune then turns north continuing to Belpech, changing to the D102 at the departmental border. Access to the village is by the D430 from Trémoulet in the north, by the D30 from Saint-Amadou in the south, and by the D6 from Lapenne in the east. The D30 continues past the village north-west to Montaut. The commune is almost entirely farmland with a few small patches of forest.

The Hers river forms the whole eastern border of the commune as it flows north to join the Ariege near Cintegabelle. The Estaut stream forms the whole western border of the commune as it flows north to join the Hers north-west of Belpech.

== History ==
La Bastide-de-Lordat appears as la Baftide Garderenoud on the 1750 Cassini Map and as la Bastide on the 1790 version.

=== Heraldry ===
| Arms of La Bastide-de-Lordat | Blazon: Or, a chevron fracted Sable. |

== Administration ==
List of Successive Mayors

| From | To | Name |
|---|---|---|
| 2001 | 2004 | Francis Olivetti |
| 2004 | 2008 | Marie-Claude Pagès |
| 2008 | 2014 | Frédéric Eychenne |
| 2014 | 2026 | Jacqueline Pagliarino Freyche |

== Demography ==
The inhabitants of the commune are known as Bastidiens or Bastidiennes in French.

Historical population

| Year | Pop. | ±% p.a. |
|---|---|---|
| 1793 | 348 | — |
| 1821 | 388 | +0.39% |
| 1846 | 458 | +0.67% |
| 1872 | 451 | −0.06% |
| 1901 | 356 | −0.81% |
| 1926 | 249 | −1.42% |
| 1946 | 237 | −0.25% |
| 1962 | 241 | +0.10% |
| 1968 | 211 | −2.19% |

| Year | Pop. | ±% p.a. |
|---|---|---|
| 1975 | 182 | −2.09% |
| 1982 | 145 | −3.19% |
| 1990 | 153 | +0.67% |
| 1999 | 213 | +3.74% |
| 2007 | 255 | +2.28% |
| 2012 | 271 | +1.22% |
| 2017 | 286 | +1.08% |
| 2023 | 330 | +2.41% |

Source: EHESS and INSEE

== Culture and heritage ==
The commune has a very large number of items that are registered as historical objects - mostly in the Church of Saint Etienne but with other objects in the Town Hall and the Cemetery.

=== Civil heritage ===
The War Memorial (1927) is registered as an historical monument.

=== Religious heritage ===
The commune has several religious buildings and sites that are registered as historical monuments:

- The Cemetery (19th century)
- The Delquié Family Funeral Chapel (19th century)
- The Astre Family Funeral Chapel (19th century)
- The Castel-Maury Family Tomb (19th century)
- The Parish Church of Saint-Etienne (1875)

== See also ==
- Communes of the Ariège department
