= Bonnacois =

Bonnacois may refer to:

- Bonnac, Ariège inhabitants
- Bonnac-la-Côte inhabitants
