= Bastidiens =

Bastidiens may refer to:

- La Bastide-de-Lordat inhabitants
- La Bastide-de-Sérou inhabitants
- La Bastide-sur-l'Hers inhabitants
