= Canton of Portes d'Ariège =

Coordinates: 43.23°N 1.58°E

- Canton
- Situation of the canton of Portes d'Ariège in the department of Ariège
- Country: France
- Region: Occitania
- Department: Ariège
- No. of communes: {{{nbcomm}}}
- Population (2023): 13,627
- INSEE code: 0910

The canton of Portes d'Ariège is an administrative division of the Ariège department, southern France. It was created at the French canton reorganisation which came into effect in March 2015. Its seat is in Saverdun.

It consists of the following communes:

1. La Bastide-de-Lordat
2. Bonnac
3. Brie
4. Canté
5. Esplas
6. Gaudiès
7. Justiniac
8. Labatut
9. Lissac
10. Mazères
11. Montaut
12. Saint-Quirc
13. Saverdun
14. Trémoulet
15. Le Vernet
16. Villeneuve-du-Paréage
