= Gaudiès =

Commune in Occitanie, France

- Commune
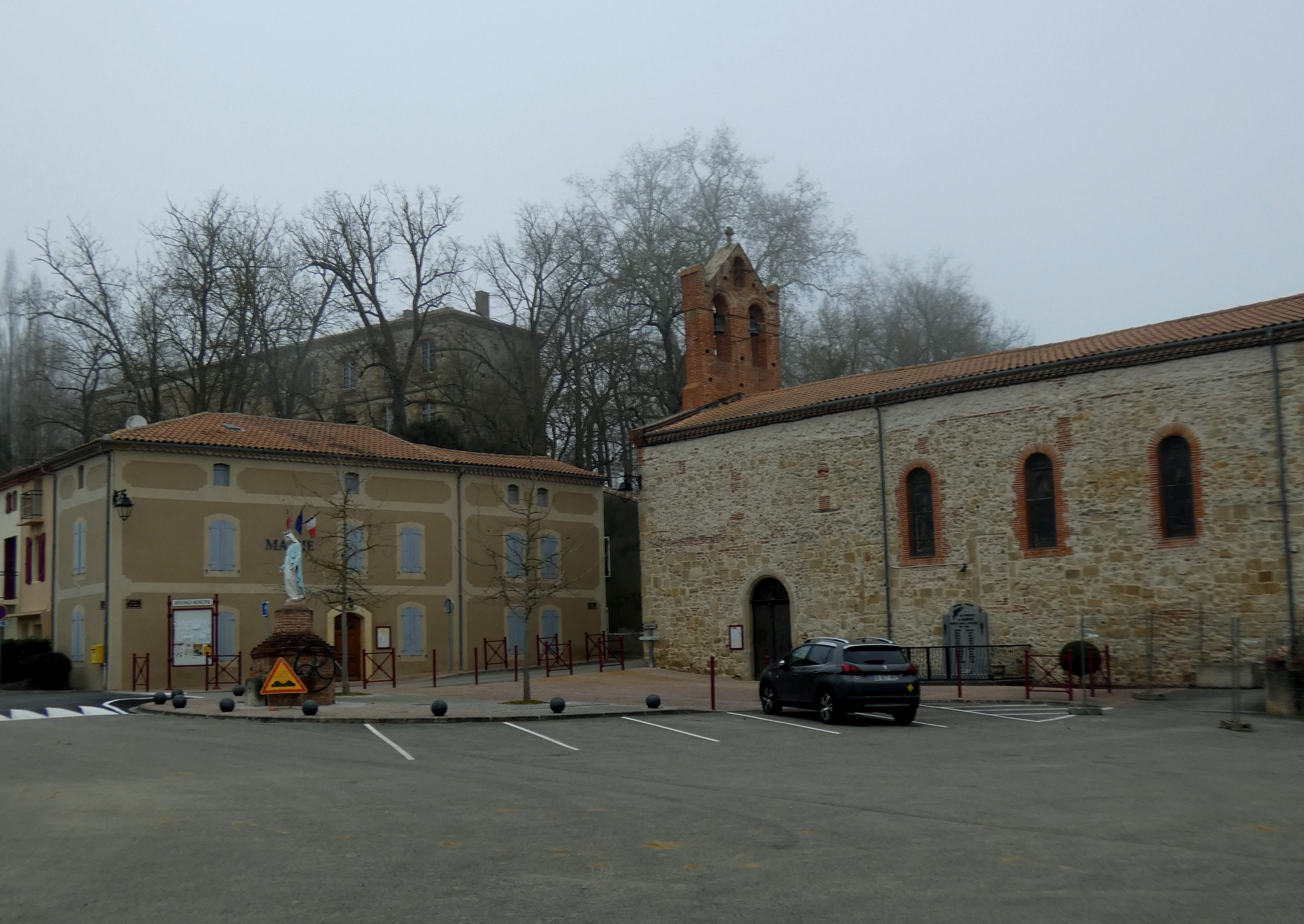

- Coat of arms
- Location of Gaudiès
- Location within France Location within Occitanie
- Coordinates: 43°10′34″N 1°43′55″E
- Country: France
- Region: Occitania
- Department: Ariège
- Arrondissement: Pamiers
- Canton: Portes d'Ariège

Government
  - Mayor (2020–2026): Philippe Vidal
- Area^{1}: 10.41 km^{2} (4.02 sq mi)
- Elevation: 259 m (850 ft)
- Highest elevation: 370 m (1,210 ft)
- Lowest elevation: 238 m (781 ft)
- Population (2023): 235
  - Density: 22.6/km^{2} (58.5/sq mi)
- Time zone: UTC+01:00 (CET)
  - Summer (DST): UTC+02:00 (CEST)
- INSEE/Postal code: 09132 /09700
- ^{1} French Land Register data, which excludes lakes, ponds, glaciers > 1 km^{2} (0.386 sq mi or 247 acres) and river estuaries.

Gaudiès (French pronunciation: [ɡodjɛs]; Occitan: Gaudièrs) is a commune in the Ariège department in southwestern France.

== Population ==
Historical population
Year	Pop.	±% p.a.
1968	204	—
1975	180	−1.77%
1982	162	−1.49%
1990	174	+0.90%
1999	200	+1.56%
2007	225	+1.48%
2012	209	−1.46%
2017	243	+3.06%
2023	235	−0.56%
Source: INSEE

== See also ==
- Communes of the Ariège department
