= Villeneuve-du-Paréage =

Commune in Occitanie, France

- Commune
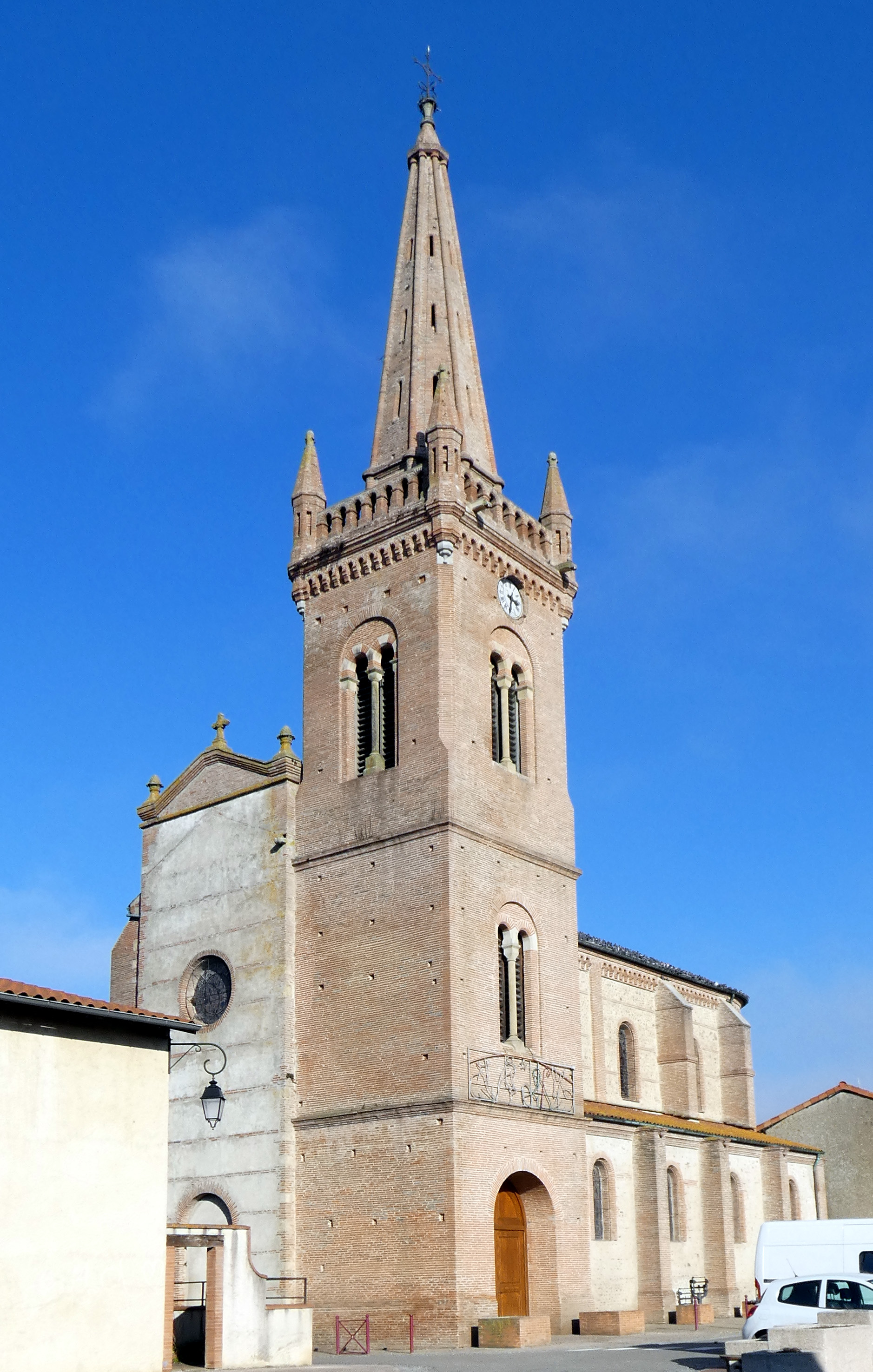
- The church of Saint-Blaise of Villeneuve-du-Paréage

- Coat of arms
- Location of Villeneuve-du-Paréage
- Location within France Location within Occitanie
- Coordinates: 43°09′20″N 1°38′18″E
- Country: France
- Region: Occitania
- Department: Ariège
- Arrondissement: Pamiers
- Canton: Portes d'Ariège

Government
  - Mayor (2020–2026): Jeanine Izaac
- Area^{1}: 11.47 km^{2} (4.43 sq mi)
- Elevation: 278 m (912 ft)
- Highest elevation: 290 m (950 ft)
- Lowest elevation: 266 m (873 ft)
- Population (2023): 739
  - Density: 64.4/km^{2} (167/sq mi)
- Time zone: UTC+01:00 (CET)
  - Summer (DST): UTC+02:00 (CEST)
- INSEE/Postal code: 09339 /09100
- ^{1} French Land Register data, which excludes lakes, ponds, glaciers > 1 km^{2} (0.386 sq mi or 247 acres) and river estuaries.

Villeneuve-du-Paréage (French pronunciation: [vilnœv dy paʁeaʒ]; Occitan: Vilanòva del Pariatge) is a commune in the Ariège department in southwestern France.

== Population ==
Inhabitants of Villeneuve-du-Paréage are called Villeneuvois in French.

Historical population
Year	Pop.	±% p.a.
1968	374	—
1975	358	−0.62%
1982	412	+2.03%
1990	489	+2.16%
1999	523	+0.75%
2007	627	+2.29%
2012	748	+3.59%
2017	765	+0.45%
2023	739	−0.57%
Source: INSEE

== See also ==
- Communes of the Ariège department
