= Mazères, Ariège =

Commune in Occitanie, France

Mazères
- Commune
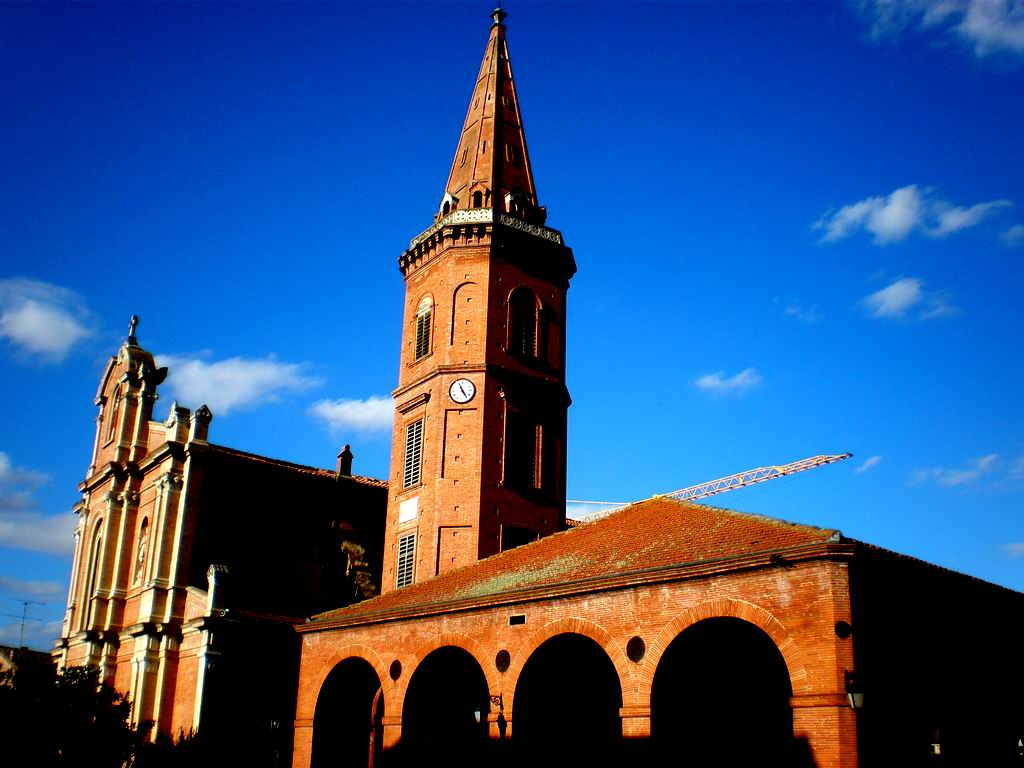
- The church in Mazères

- Coat of arms
- Location of Mazères
- Location within France Location within Occitanie
- Coordinates: 43°15′09″N 1°40′44″E
- Country: France
- Region: Occitania
- Department: Ariège
- Arrondissement: Pamiers
- Canton: Portes d'Ariège
- Intercommunality: Portes d'Ariège Pyrénées

Government
  - Mayor (2020–2026): Louis Marette
- Area^{1}: 44.04 km^{2} (17.00 sq mi)
- Elevation: 243 m (797 ft)
- Highest elevation: 333 m (1,093 ft)
- Lowest elevation: 218 m (715 ft)
- Population (2023): 3,852
  - Density: 87.47/km^{2} (226.5/sq mi)
- Time zone: UTC+01:00 (CET)
  - Summer (DST): UTC+02:00 (CEST)
- INSEE/Postal code: 09185 /09270
- ^{1} French Land Register data, which excludes lakes, ponds, glaciers > 1 km^{2} (0.386 sq mi or 247 acres) and river estuaries.

Mazères (French pronunciation: [mazɛʁ]; Occitan: Maseras) is a commune in the Ariège department in southwestern France.

== Population ==
Historical population
Year	Pop.	±% p.a.
1968	2,192	—
1975	2,071	−0.81%
1982	2,355	+1.85%
1990	2,519	+0.85%
1999	2,616	+0.42%
2007	3,287	+2.90%
2012	3,778	+2.82%
2017	3,877	+0.52%
2023	3,852	−0.11%
Source: INSEE

== See also ==
- Communes of the Ariège department
