= Esplas =

Commune in Occitanie, France

- Commune
- Location of Esplas
- Location within France Location within Occitanie
- Coordinates: 43°11′19″N 1°29′59″E
- Country: France
- Region: Occitania
- Department: Ariège
- Arrondissement: Pamiers
- Canton: Portes d'Ariège

Government
  - Mayor (2024–2026): Simon Herraiz
- Area^{1}: 7.64 km^{2} (2.95 sq mi)
- Elevation: 350 m (1,150 ft)
- Highest elevation: 370 m (1,210 ft)
- Lowest elevation: 259 m (850 ft)
- Population (2023): 104
  - Density: 13.6/km^{2} (35.3/sq mi)
- Time zone: UTC+01:00 (CET)
  - Summer (DST): UTC+02:00 (CEST)
- INSEE/Postal code: 09117 /09700
- ^{1} French Land Register data, which excludes lakes, ponds, glaciers > 1 km^{2} (0.386 sq mi or 247 acres) and river estuaries.

Esplas is a commune in the Ariège department in southwestern France.

== Population ==
Historical population
| Year | Pop. | ±% p.a. |
|---|---|---|
| 1968 | 96 | — |
| 1975 | 94 | −0.30% |
| 1982 | 104 | +1.45% |
| 1990 | 72 | −4.49% |
| 1999 | 93 | +2.88% |
| 2007 | 89 | −0.55% |
| 2012 | 95 | +1.31% |
| 2017 | 103 | +1.63% |
| 2023 | 104 | +0.16% |
Source: INSEE

== See also ==
- Communes of the Ariège department
