= Montaut, Ariège =

Commune in Occitanie, France

Montaut
- Commune
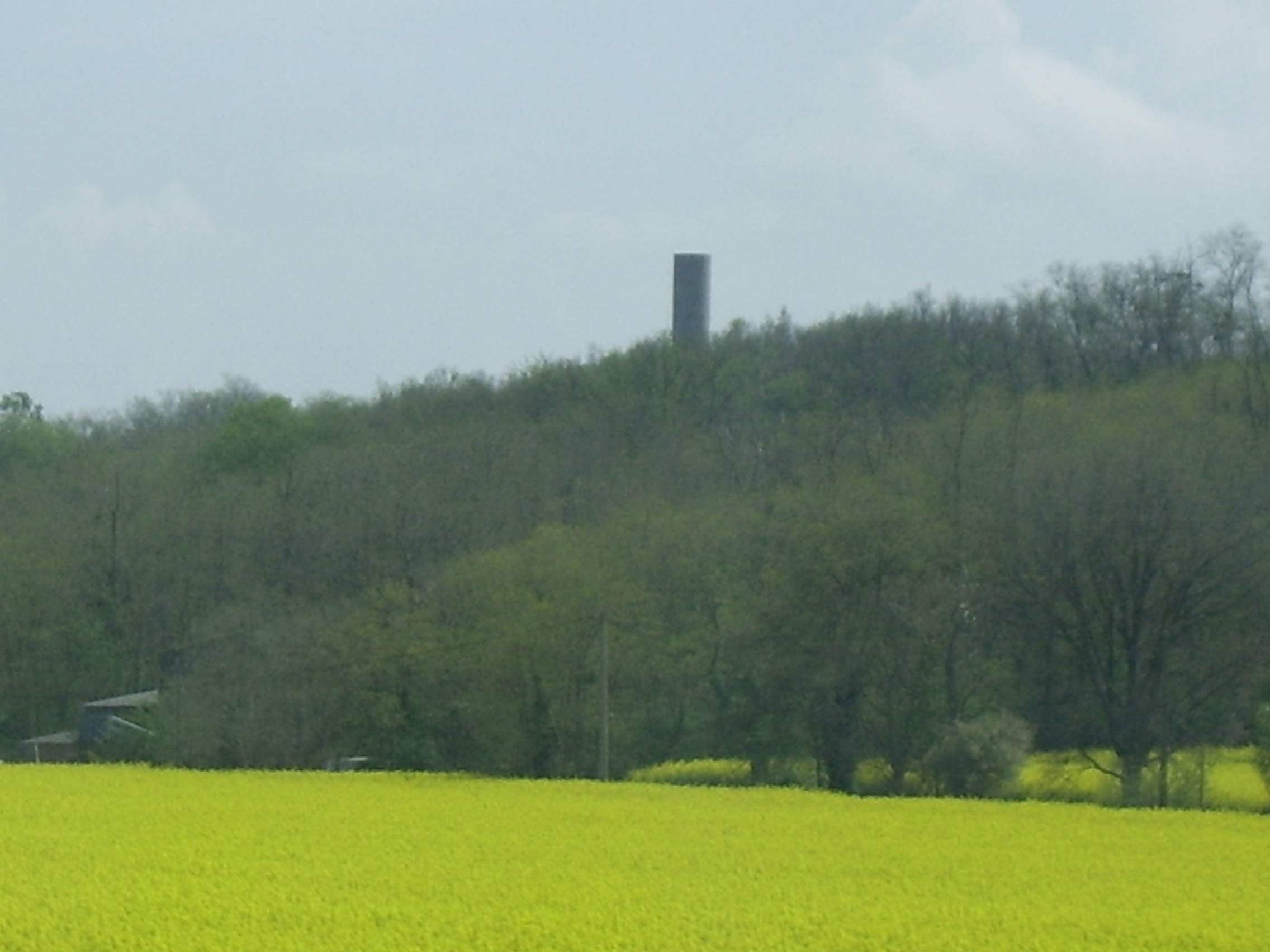
- The landscape of Montaut

- Coat of arms
- Location of Montaut
- Location within France Location within Occitanie
- Coordinates: 43°11′18″N 1°38′41″E
- Country: France
- Region: Occitania
- Department: Ariège
- Arrondissement: Pamiers
- Canton: Portes d'Ariège
- Intercommunality: Portes d'Ariège Pyrénées

Government
  - Mayor (2020–2026): Yannick Jousseaume
- Area^{1}: 35.03 km^{2} (13.53 sq mi)
- Elevation: 280 m (920 ft)
- Highest elevation: 295 m (968 ft)
- Lowest elevation: 241 m (791 ft)
- Population (2023): 707
  - Density: 20.2/km^{2} (52.3/sq mi)
- Time zone: UTC+01:00 (CET)
  - Summer (DST): UTC+02:00 (CEST)
- INSEE/Postal code: 09199 /09700
- ^{1} French Land Register data, which excludes lakes, ponds, glaciers > 1 km^{2} (0.386 sq mi or 247 acres) and river estuaries.

Montaut (French pronunciation: [mɔ̃to]) is a commune in the Ariège department in southwestern France.

== Population ==
Historical population
Year	Pop.	±% p.a.
1968	646	—
1975	551	−2.25%
1982	538	−0.34%
1990	554	+0.37%
1999	582	+0.55%
2007	669	+1.76%
2012	691	+0.65%
2017	715	+0.69%
2023	707	−0.19%
Source: INSEE

== See also ==
- Communes of the Ariège department
