= Wild cherry =

Wild cherry is a common name for species of cherries growing outside of cultivation, especially:

- Prunus avium, commonly known as "wild cherry" in the British Isles
- Prunus serotina, commonly known as "wild cherry" in North America
- Prunus cerasus, also called "sour cherry" or "tart cherry"

Wild cherry or Wild Cherry may also refer to:

== Other plants ==
- Antidesma bunius, native to Southeast Asia and northern Australia
- Exocarpos cupressiformis, native to southeastern Australia

== Places ==
- Wild Cherry, Arkansas, a community in the United States

== Entertainment ==
- Wild Cherry (band), an American rock band
  - Wild Cherry (album), self-titled album
- Wild Cherry (film) (2009), American film directed by Dana Lustig
- Wild Cherry (TV series), British television series created by Nicôle Lecky
