= Justiniac =

Commune in Occitanie, France

- Commune
- Location of Justiniac
- Location within France Location within Occitanie
- Coordinates: 43°12′47″N 1°29′34″E
- Country: France
- Region: Occitania
- Department: Ariège
- Arrondissement: Pamiers
- Canton: Portes d'Ariège
- Intercommunality: Portes d'Ariège Pyrénées

Government
  - Mayor (2020–2026): Christine Vallès
- Area^{1}: 4.56 km^{2} (1.76 sq mi)
- Elevation: 330 m (1,080 ft)
- Highest elevation: 363 m (1,191 ft)
- Lowest elevation: 264 m (866 ft)
- Population (2023): 57
  - Density: 13/km^{2} (32/sq mi)
- Time zone: UTC+01:00 (CET)
  - Summer (DST): UTC+02:00 (CEST)
- INSEE/Postal code: 09146 /09700
- ^{1} French Land Register data, which excludes lakes, ponds, glaciers > 1 km^{2} (0.386 sq mi or 247 acres) and river estuaries.

Justiniac (French pronunciation: [ʒystinjak]; Occitan: Justinhac) is a commune in the Ariège department in southwestern France.

== Population ==
Historical population
Year	Pop.	±% p.a.
1968	60	—
1975	46	−3.72%
1982	36	−3.44%
1990	53	+4.95%
1999	58	+1.01%
2007	51	−1.59%
2012	51	+0.00%
2017	55	+1.52%
2023	57	+0.60%
Source: INSEE

Inhabitants of Justiniac are called Justiniacois in French.

== See also ==
- Communes of the Ariège department
