= Saverdun =

Commune in Occitanie, France

- Commune
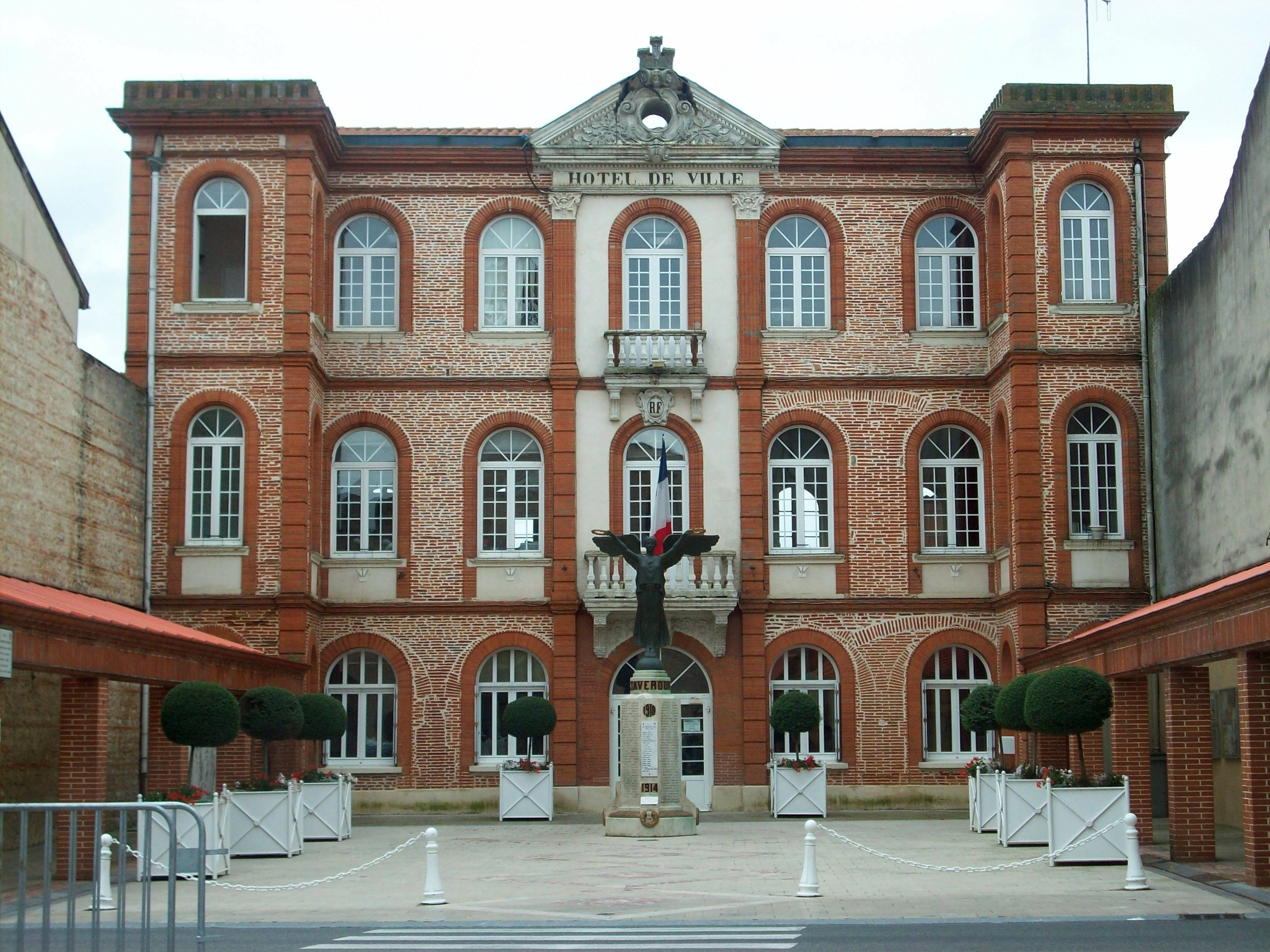
- Town hall

- Coat of arms
- Location of Saverdun
- Location within France Location within Occitanie
- Coordinates: 43°14′08″N 1°34′31″E
- Country: France
- Region: Occitania
- Department: Ariège
- Arrondissement: Pamiers
- Canton: Portes d'Ariège
- Intercommunality: Portes d'Ariège Pyrénées

Government
  - Mayor (2020–2026): Philippe Calleja
- Area^{1}: 61.47 km^{2} (23.73 sq mi)
- Elevation: 235 m (771 ft)
- Highest elevation: 374 m (1,227 ft)
- Lowest elevation: 209 m (686 ft)
- Population (2023): 4,808
  - Density: 78.22/km^{2} (202.6/sq mi)
- Time zone: UTC+01:00 (CET)
  - Summer (DST): UTC+02:00 (CEST)
- INSEE/Postal code: 09282 /09700
- ^{1} French Land Register data, which excludes lakes, ponds, glaciers > 1 km^{2} (0.386 sq mi or 247 acres) and river estuaries.

Saverdun (French pronunciation: [savɛʁdœ̃]; Languedocien: Savardun) is a commune in the Ariège department in southwestern France.

== Population ==
Inhabitants of Saverdun are called Saverdunois in French.

Historical population
Year	Pop.	±% p.a.
1968	3,916	—
1975	3,969	+0.19%
1982	3,639	−1.23%
1990	3,568	−0.25%
1999	3,589	+0.07%
2007	4,376	+2.51%
2012	4,526	+0.68%
2017	4,844	+1.37%
2023	4,808	−0.12%
Source: INSEE

== Name ==
Saverdun gave its name to the former city of Verdun, Quebec, Canada, now a borough of Montreal, which was founded in 1671 by Zacharie Dupuy, a native of Saverdun.

== History ==
Count Raymond VII of Toulouse surrendered Saverdun to Imbert de Beaujeu and Hugh of La Tour-du-Pin, royal agents, during the war of 1242.

== Transport ==
Saverdun station has rail connections to Toulouse, Foix and Latour-de-Carol.

== See also ==
- Communes of the Ariège department
