= Trémoulet =

Commune in Occitanie, France

- Commune
- Coat of arms
- Location of Trémoulet
- Location within France Location within Occitanie
- Coordinates: 43°09′27″N 1°43′10″E
- Country: France
- Region: Occitania
- Department: Ariège
- Arrondissement: Pamiers
- Canton: Portes d'Ariège

Government
  - Mayor (2020–2026): Jacques Alabert
- Area^{1}: 3.89 km^{2} (1.50 sq mi)
- Elevation: 270 m (890 ft)
- Highest elevation: 286 m (938 ft)
- Lowest elevation: 245 m (804 ft)
- Population (2023): 102
  - Density: 26.2/km^{2} (67.9/sq mi)
- Time zone: UTC+01:00 (CET)
  - Summer (DST): UTC+02:00 (CEST)
- INSEE/Postal code: 09315 /09700
- ^{1} French Land Register data, which excludes lakes, ponds, glaciers > 1 km^{2} (0.386 sq mi or 247 acres) and river estuaries.

Trémoulet (French pronunciation: [tʁemulɛ]; Occitan: Tremolet) is a commune in the Ariège department in southwestern France.

== Population ==
Inhabitants of Trémoulet are called Trémouletois in French.

Historical population
Year	Pop.	±% p.a.
1968	91	—
1975	96	+0.77%
1982	81	−2.40%
1990	69	−1.98%
1999	66	−0.49%
2007	83	+2.91%
2012	116	+6.92%
2017	125	+1.51%
2023	102	−3.33%
Source: INSEE

== See also ==
- Communes of the Ariège department
