= Brie, Ariège =

Commune in Occitanie, France

Brie
- Commune
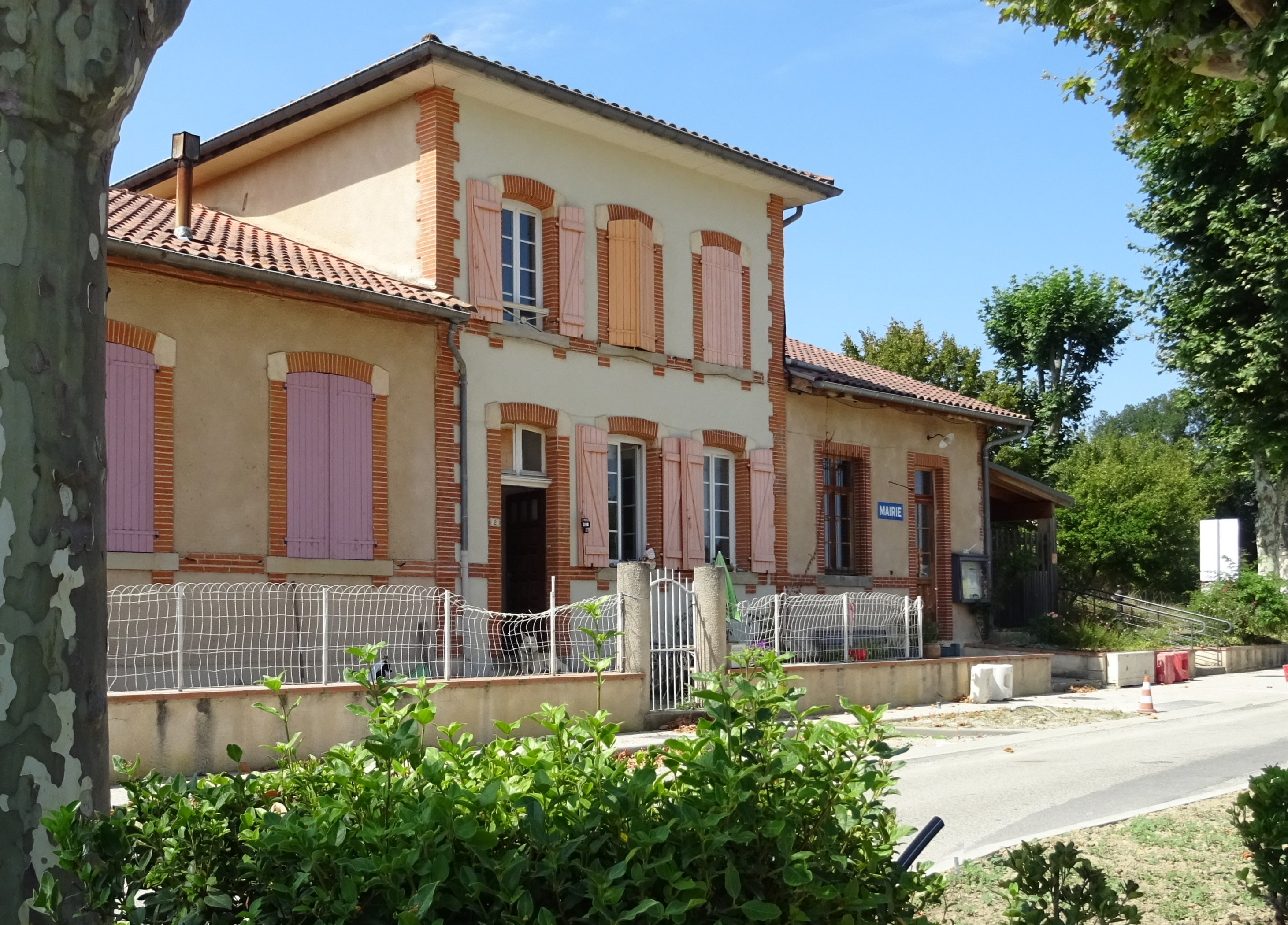
- Town hall
- Location of Brie
- Location within France Location within Occitanie
- Coordinates: 43°12′23″N 1°31′09″E
- Country: France
- Region: Occitania
- Department: Ariège
- Arrondissement: Pamiers
- Canton: Portes d'Ariège

Government
  - Mayor (2020–2026): Isabelle Peyrefitte
- Area^{1}: 7.06 km^{2} (2.73 sq mi)
- Elevation: 247 m (810 ft)
- Highest elevation: 363 m (1,191 ft)
- Lowest elevation: 255 m (837 ft)
- Population (2023): 207
  - Density: 29.3/km^{2} (75.9/sq mi)
- Time zone: UTC+01:00 (CET)
  - Summer (DST): UTC+02:00 (CEST)
- INSEE/Postal code: 09067 /09700
- ^{1} French Land Register data, which excludes lakes, ponds, glaciers > 1 km^{2} (0.386 sq mi or 247 acres) and river estuaries.

Brie (French pronunciation: [bʁi]; Occitan: Bria) is a commune in the Ariège department of southwestern France. The commune is located on the slopes between the rivers Ariège and Lèze. It borders the department of Haute-Garonne. The mayor is Isabelle Peyrefitte.

== Population ==
Inhabitants of Brie are called Briençais in French.

Historical population
Year	Pop.	±% p.a.
1968	133	—
1975	92	−5.13%
1982	80	−1.98%
1990	92	+1.76%
1999	150	+5.58%
2007	167	+1.35%
2012	193	+2.94%
2017	219	+2.56%
2023	207	−0.93%
Source: INSEE

== See also ==
- Communes of the Ariège department
