= Bonnac, Ariège =

Commune in Occitanie, France

Bonnac
- Commune
- Coat of arms
- Location of Bonnac
- Location within France Location within Occitanie
- Coordinates: 43°10′01″N 1°35′36″E
- Country: France
- Region: Occitania
- Department: Ariège
- Arrondissement: Pamiers
- Canton: Portes d'Ariège

Government
  - Mayor (2020–2026): Daniel Courneil
- Area^{1}: 9.63 km^{2} (3.72 sq mi)
- Elevation: 268 m (879 ft)
- Highest elevation: 413 m (1,355 ft)
- Lowest elevation: 237 m (778 ft)
- Population (2023): 801
  - Density: 83.2/km^{2} (215/sq mi)
- Time zone: UTC+01:00 (CET)
  - Summer (DST): UTC+02:00 (CEST)
- INSEE/Postal code: 09060 /09100
- ^{1} French Land Register data, which excludes lakes, ponds, glaciers > 1 km^{2} (0.386 sq mi or 247 acres) and river estuaries.

Bonnac (French pronunciation: [bɔnak]; Occitan: Bonac) is a commune in the Ariège department of southwestern France. It lies between the altitudes of 237 and 413 m. The village currently lies at the bottom of a hill but was previously located on the hill as evidence by remains of foundations. A castle, now ruined, lay on top of the hill and was itself built on top of Roman foundations. The most notable building is the Eglise Saint-Pierre which dates to the 12th century and houses a baptismal font dating back to the early Romanesque era.

== Population ==
Historical population
Year	Pop.	±% p.a.
1968	587	—
1975	581	−0.15%
1982	615	+0.82%
1990	646	+0.62%
1999	680	+0.57%
2007	708	+0.51%
2012	721	+0.36%
2017	733	+0.33%
2023	801	+1.49%
Source: INSEE

Inhabitants of Bonnac are called Bonnacois in French.

== See also ==
- Communes of the Ariège department

Bonnac is home to a number of companies, including Laines Paysannes, whose aim is to promote wool as a natural and sustainable resource. Laines Paysannes is committed to supporting a traceable, local wool industry. (https://laines-paysannes.fr)
