= Lissac, Ariège =

Commune in Occitanie, France

Lissac
- Commune
- Location of Lissac
- Location within France Location within Occitanie
- Coordinates: 43°16′13″N 1°30′43″E
- Country: France
- Region: Occitania
- Department: Ariège
- Arrondissement: Pamiers
- Canton: Portes d'Ariège
- Intercommunality: Portes d'Ariège Pyrénées

Government
  - Mayor (2020–2026): Monique Dupré-Godfrey
- Area^{1}: 3.77 km^{2} (1.46 sq mi)
- Elevation: 278 m (912 ft)
- Highest elevation: 334 m (1,096 ft)
- Lowest elevation: 212 m (696 ft)
- Population (2023): 237
  - Density: 62.9/km^{2} (163/sq mi)
- Time zone: UTC+01:00 (CET)
  - Summer (DST): UTC+02:00 (CEST)
- INSEE/Postal code: 09170 /09700
- ^{1} French Land Register data, which excludes lakes, ponds, glaciers > 1 km^{2} (0.386 sq mi or 247 acres) and river estuaries.

Lissac (French pronunciation: [lisak]) is a commune in the Ariège department in southwestern France.

== Population ==
Historical population
Year	Pop.	±% p.a.
1968	187	—
1975	199	+0.89%
1982	136	−5.29%
1990	164	+2.37%
1999	176	+0.79%
2007	202	+1.74%
2012	207	+0.49%
2017	246	+3.51%
2023	237	−0.62%
Source: INSEE

== See also ==
- Communes of the Ariège department
