= Labatut, Ariège =

Commune in Occitanie, France

Labatut
- Commune
- Location of Labatut
- Location within France Location within Occitanie
- Coordinates: 43°15′45″N 1°31′03″E
- Country: France
- Region: Occitania
- Department: Ariège
- Arrondissement: Pamiers
- Canton: Portes d'Ariège
- Intercommunality: Portes d'Ariège Pyrénées

Government
  - Mayor (2020–2026): Jean Crespy
- Area^{1}: 3.58 km^{2} (1.38 sq mi)
- Elevation: 241 m (791 ft)
- Highest elevation: 305 m (1,001 ft)
- Lowest elevation: 217 m (712 ft)
- Population (2023): 178
  - Density: 49.7/km^{2} (129/sq mi)
- Time zone: UTC+01:00 (CET)
  - Summer (DST): UTC+02:00 (CEST)
- INSEE/Postal code: 09147 /09700
- ^{1} French Land Register data, which excludes lakes, ponds, glaciers > 1 km^{2} (0.386 sq mi or 247 acres) and river estuaries.

Labatut is a commune in the Ariège department in southwestern France.

== Population ==
Historical population
| Year | Pop. | ±% p.a. |
|---|---|---|
| 1968 | 109 | — |
| 1975 | 84 | −3.65% |
| 1982 | 81 | −0.52% |
| 1990 | 80 | −0.16% |
| 1999 | 79 | −0.14% |
| 2007 | 114 | +4.69% |
| 2012 | 144 | +4.78% |
| 2017 | 176 | +4.10% |
| 2023 | 178 | +0.19% |
Source: INSEE

== See also ==
- Communes of the Ariège department
