= Villeneuve-du-Latou =

Commune in Occitanie, France

- Commune
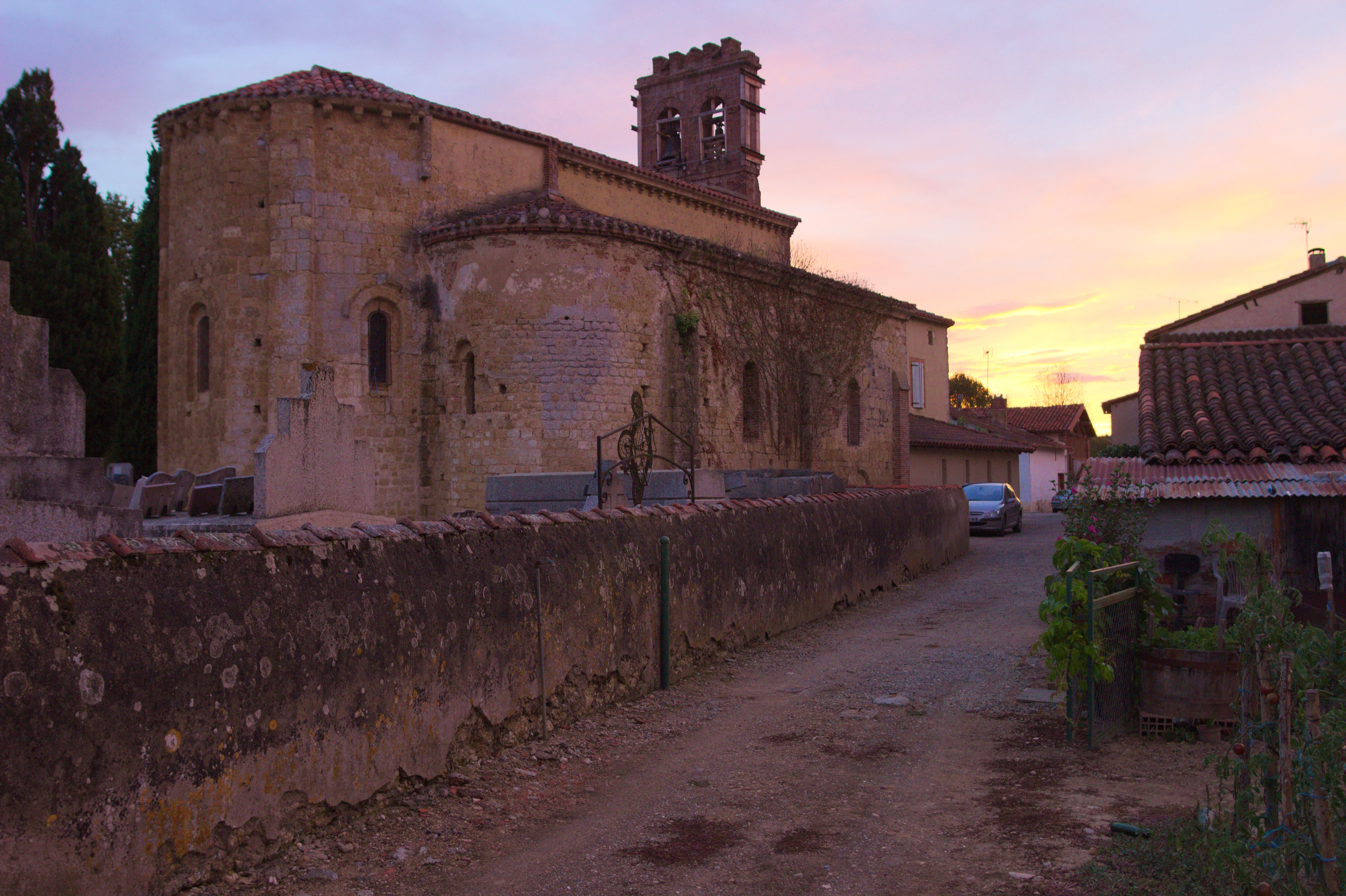
- The church in Villeneuve-du-Latou
- Location of Villeneuve-du-Latou
- Location within France Location within Occitanie
- Coordinates: 43°12′16″N 1°26′03″E
- Country: France
- Region: Occitania
- Department: Ariège
- Arrondissement: Saint-Girons
- Canton: Arize-Lèze

Government
  - Mayor (2020–2026): Philippe Jaloux
- Area^{1}: 6.52 km^{2} (2.52 sq mi)
- Elevation: 346 m (1,135 ft)
- Highest elevation: 369 m (1,211 ft)
- Lowest elevation: 232 m (761 ft)
- Population (2023): 154
  - Density: 23.6/km^{2} (61.2/sq mi)
- Time zone: UTC+01:00 (CET)
  - Summer (DST): UTC+02:00 (CEST)
- INSEE/Postal code: 09338 /09130
- ^{1} French Land Register data, which excludes lakes, ponds, glaciers > 1 km^{2} (0.386 sq mi or 247 acres) and river estuaries.

Villeneuve-du-Latou (French pronunciation: [vilnœv dy latu]; Occitan: Vilanava del Laton) is a commune in the Ariège department in southwestern France.

== Population ==
Inhabitants of Villeneuve-du-Latou are called Villeneuvoux in French.

Historical population
| Year | Pop. | ±% p.a. |
|---|---|---|
| 1968 | 135 | — |
| 1975 | 103 | −3.79% |
| 1982 | 113 | +1.33% |
| 1990 | 116 | +0.33% |
| 1999 | 112 | −0.39% |
| 2007 | 107 | −0.57% |
| 2012 | 141 | +5.67% |
| 2017 | 158 | +2.30% |
| 2023 | 154 | −0.43% |
Source: INSEE

== See also ==
- Communes of the Ariège department
