= Canté =

Commune in Occitanie, France

- Commune
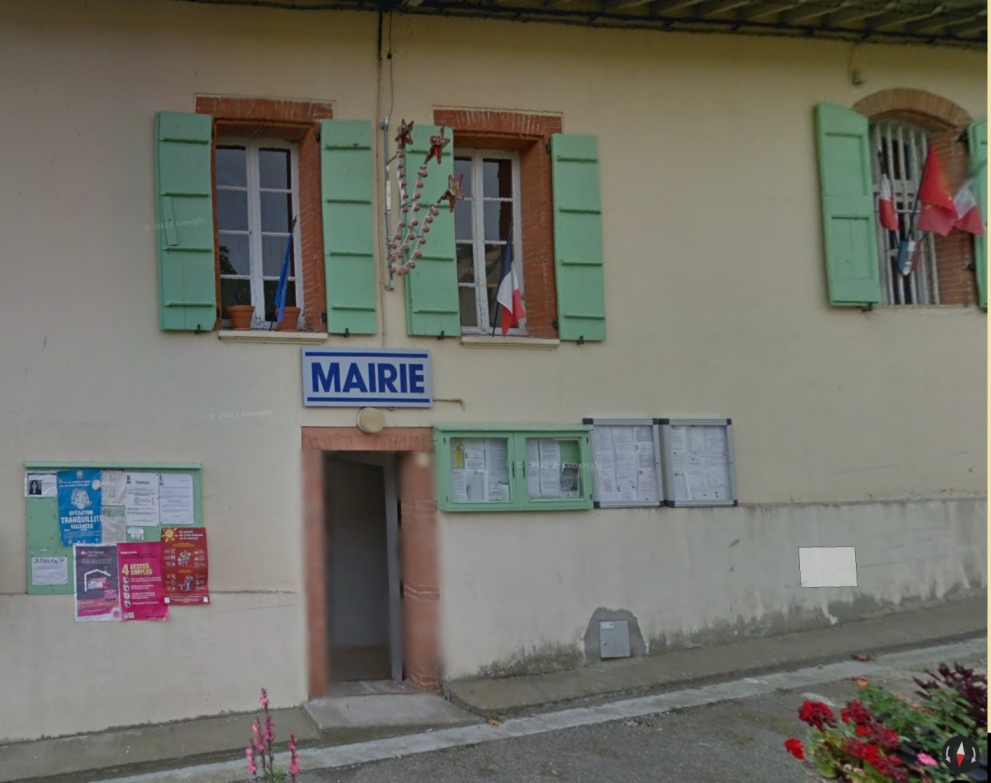
- Canté Town hall

- Coat of arms
- Location of Canté
- Location within France Location within Occitanie
- Coordinates: 43°15′20″N 1°31′56″E
- Country: France
- Region: Occitania
- Department: Ariège
- Arrondissement: Pamiers
- Canton: Portes d'Ariège
- Intercommunality: Portes d'Ariège Pyrénées

Government
  - Mayor (2020–2026): Eric Cancel
- Area^{1}: 9.8 km^{2} (3.8 sq mi)
- Elevation: 225 m (738 ft)
- Highest elevation: 352 m (1,155 ft)
- Lowest elevation: 216 m (709 ft)
- Population (2023): 222
  - Density: 23/km^{2} (59/sq mi)
- Time zone: UTC+01:00 (CET)
  - Summer (DST): UTC+02:00 (CEST)
- INSEE/Postal code: 09076 /09700
- ^{1} French Land Register data, which excludes lakes, ponds, glaciers > 1 km^{2} (0.386 sq mi or 247 acres) and river estuaries.

Canté (French pronunciation: [kɑ̃te]; Occitan: Cante) is a commune in the Ariège department in southwestern France.

== Population ==
Historical population
Year	Pop.	±% p.a.
1968	150	—
1975	158	+0.75%
1982	142	−1.51%
1990	164	+1.82%
1999	179	+0.98%
2007	201	+1.46%
2012	209	+0.78%
2017	205	−0.39%
2023	222	+1.34%
Source: INSEE

== See also ==
- Communes of the Ariège department
