= Saint-Quirc =

Commune in Occitanie, France

- Commune
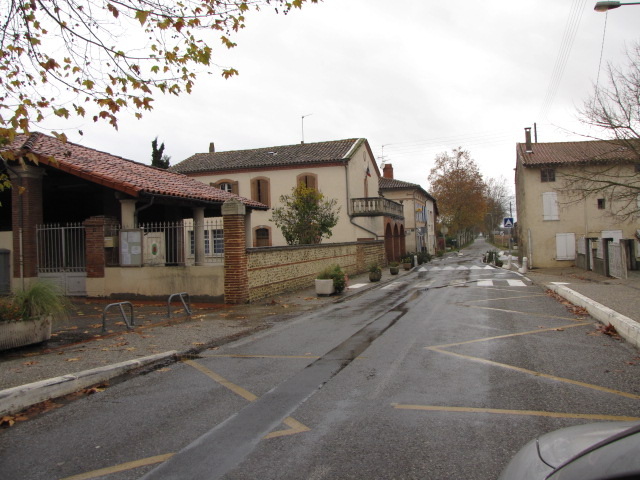
- A view within Saint-Quirc

- Coat of arms
- Location of Saint-Quirc
- Location within France Location within Occitanie
- Coordinates: 43°16′37″N 1°30′11″E
- Country: France
- Region: Occitania
- Department: Ariège
- Arrondissement: Pamiers
- Canton: Portes d'Ariège
- Intercommunality: Portes d'Ariège Pyrénées

Government
  - Mayor (2020–2026): Martine Le Lostec
- Area^{1}: 3.75 km^{2} (1.45 sq mi)
- Elevation: 217 m (712 ft)
- Highest elevation: 292 m (958 ft)
- Lowest elevation: 207 m (679 ft)
- Population (2023): 366
  - Density: 97.6/km^{2} (253/sq mi)
- Time zone: UTC+01:00 (CET)
  - Summer (DST): UTC+02:00 (CEST)
- INSEE/Postal code: 09275 /09700
- ^{1} French Land Register data, which excludes lakes, ponds, glaciers > 1 km^{2} (0.386 sq mi or 247 acres) and river estuaries.

Saint-Quirc (French pronunciation: [sɛ̃ kiʁk]; Occitan: Sent Quirc) is a commune in the Ariège department in southwestern France.

== Population ==
Inhabitants of Saint-Quirc are called Saint-Quircois in French.

Historical population
Year	Pop.	±% p.a.
1968	253	—
1975	250	−0.17%
1982	237	−0.76%
1990	221	−0.87%
1999	267	+2.12%
2007	346	+3.29%
2012	396	+2.74%
2017	368	−1.46%
2023	366	−0.09%
Source: INSEE

== See also ==
- Communes of the Ariège department
