= Yves Lambert =

French aerospace engineer (1936–2021)

- Born: Yves Maurice Lambert; 4 June 1936; Nancy, France
- Died: 27 March 2021 (aged 84); Paris, France
- Education: Aerospace engineer
- Alma mater: École polytechnique École nationale de l'aviation civile
- Occupation: Former head of Eurocontrol
- Known for: Director General of the Eurocontrol

Yves Maurice Lambert (4 June 1936 – 27 March 2021) was a French aerospace engineer. He was Director General of Eurocontrol from 1994 to 2000.

== Biography ==
A graduate of the École Polytechnique (1956) and the École nationale de l'aviation civile (French civil aviation University, promotion 1959), Lambert started his career as head of the technical department of the civil aviation in Algeria (1961). After that, he became director of the air safety organization Organisation de gestion et de sécurité in Algeria (1965–1968).

In 1972, he was nominated to be the French representative at the International Civil Aviation Organization. He became Secretary General of ICAO in 1976, a position he held until 1988. He returned to France to be air navigation director of Direction de la navigation aérienne now called Direction des Services de la navigation aérienne until 1993.

In 1994, he was nominated Director General of Eurocontrol, a position he held until his retirement in 2000.

Yves Lambert was a member of the Académie de l'air et de l'espace and the Royal Aeronautical Society. Lambert died in Paris, France on 27 March 2021, at the age of 84.

== Awards ==
- Officier of the Legion of Honour
- Commandeur of the Ordre national du Mérite
- Médaille de l'Aéronautique

== Bibliography ==
- Académie nationale de l'air et de l'espace and Lucien Robineau, Les français du ciel, dictionnaire historique, Le Cherche midi, June 2005, 782 p. (ISBN 2-7491-0415-7), p. 304, LAMBERT, Yves
