= Émile Allegret =

French soldier and member of the French Resistance

- Born: 24 April 1907; Dijon, France
- Died: 22 November 1990 (aged 83); Vaux-sur-Mer, France
- Education: École nationale de l'aviation civile
- Occupation: Soldier during World War II
- Known for: Companion of the Liberation
- Title: Captain (OF-2)

Émile Allegret (24 April 1907 – 22 November 1990) was a French soldier and member of the French Resistance during World War II.

== Biography ==
After secondary school, he joined the French Air Force in 1926 for five years. A non-commissioned officer, he followed the course for élève aspirant (training student) (EOR). He then graduated from the École nationale de l'aviation civile (French civil aviation university) and became an engineer and test pilot. A reserve officer, he was staying at Royan as a flight instructor when war was declared in September 1939. He heard the appeal of 18 June 1940 and, after the second Armistice at Compiègne, refused to fly for the German air force. Allegret quickly joined the French Resistance. Obliged to conceal his identity, he became an agent of the resistance movement Organisation civile et militaire. After joining the 6th arrondissement of Paris, he carried out information missions on the Atlantic coast and in particular at Royan, where he revealed the location of fortifications and coastal defense batteries. He succeeded in a mission to avoid weapons and ammunition stored in the basement of the City Hall of Royan. Hunted by the Gestapo, he had to leave France and succeeded, 24 December 1942, in joining Spain by crossing the Pyrenees.

He enlisted in the Free French Forces 25 January 1943 at the French mission at Gibraltar. Arriving in London, he was incorporated in the Free French Forces 13 February 1943, and on 5 March 1943 he joined the Bombardment Group "Lorraine", called "Squadron 342". He flew against German anti-aircraft 23 December 1943, and again 5 and 9 February 1944. During this time, in January 1944, the lieutenant Allegret took command of the squadron "Metz" and multiplied the bombing operations. Then, he participated in the historic mission of protection, smoke screening troops for Normandy landings on the Normandy coast 6 June 1944. He was seriously injured on duty, 27 January 1945. He ended the war with the rank of Captain, carrying out 55 bombings in total with "Lorraine", including several skim bombings.

After the war, Allegret started a career as an air navigation engineer. He joined the Secrétariat général de l'aviation civile (civil aviation department) in 1961 as an air navigation division engineer. He became head of the Toulouse-Blagnac Airport. He last job was head assistant at the Nice Côte d'Azur Airport before retiring in May 1968.

Allegret died 22 November 1990 (83 years old) at Vaux-sur-Mer.

== Honours ==
- Commandeur of the Légion d'honneur
- Companion of the Liberation - Decree of 8 May 1945
- Croix de guerre 1939–1945
- Médaille de la Résistance
- Croix du combattant volontaire de la Résistance
- Médaille des Évadés
- Médaille de l'Aéronautique
- Médaille commémorative des services volontaires dans la France libre
- Distinguished Flying Cross
- Service militaire volontaire argent
- Médaille de la France libérée
- European African middle eastern campaign medal

== Bibliography ==
- Académie nationale de l'air et de l'espace and Lucien Robineau, Les français du ciel, dictionnaire historique, Le Cherche midi, June 2005, 782 p. (ISBN 2-7491-0415-7), p. 29, ALLÉGRET, Émile
