= Denis Mercier =

Denis Mercier

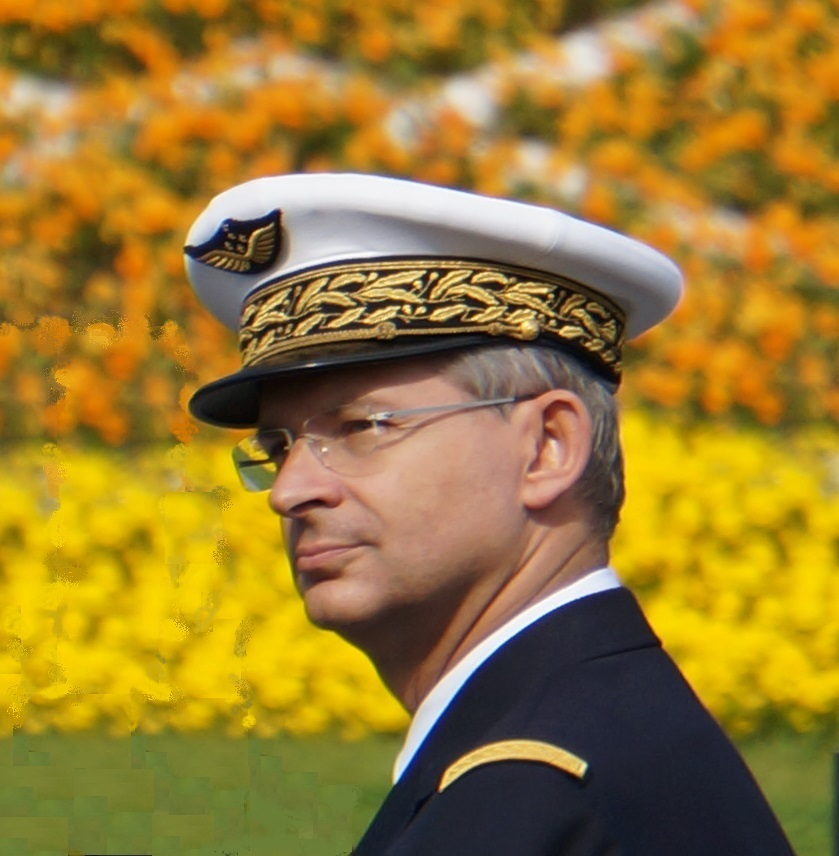
- General Denis Mercier, 2015
- Born: 4 October 1959 (age 66)
- Allegiance: France
- Branch: French Air Force
- Service years: 1983 – 2018
- Rank: Général d'armée aérienne
- Commands: Supreme Allied Commander Transformation NATO; Chief of Staff of the French Air Force; Major general of the French Air Force; Divisional General of the French Air Force; Commandant of the French Air Force base Cazaux Air Base (BA 120); Commandant of the French Air Force base Taverny Air Base (BA 921); Commandant of the French Air Force base Reims – Champagne Air Base (BA 112); Commandant of the French Air Force base Cambrai – Épinoy Air Base (BA 103)
- Conflicts: Operation Crécerelle; Operation Deny Flight
- Awards: Grand Officier de la Légion d’Honneur Officier de l’Ordre National du Mérite Medal of Aeronautics

Général d'armée aérienne Denis Mercier (born 4 October 1959) is a former Chief of Staff of the French Air Force. He was appointed on 17 September 2012. On September 30, 2015, he succeeded General Paloméros and became Supreme Allied Commander Transformation of NATO.

== Military career ==
He joined the French Air Force academy in 1979 where he completed a master's degree of Science in 1981. Qualified as a fighter pilot in 1983, he acquired extensive experience both as an operational commander and as a fighter pilot, having flown a total of more than 3000 flying hours primarily on Mirage F1C and Mirage 2000C aircraft, including 182 hours in combat missions.

Above all, NATO has been a constant throughout his career, at the tactical, operational and strategic level. Indeed, he commanded the 1/12 "Cambrésis" Fighter Squadron, a founding unit of the NATO Tiger association. He participated in numerous other NATO exercises and operations, including Operation Deny Flight over Bosnia-Herzegovina in 1994. Subsequently, he served in the NATO department of the French Joint Operational Planning Headquarters, working as a project officer for Exercise "Strong Resolve ’98", during which he embarked aboard USS Mount Whitney as director of Joint Fires. In 1999, he integrated the operational planning of French participation in NATO Operation Allied Force in Kosovo.

Posted from 1999 to 2002 as deputy head of the combined joint task force deputy branch at Regional Headquarters AFNORTH, in Brunssum (Netherlands), he contributed to the development of the Combined Joint Task Force (CJTF) concept. He was a member of the combined analysis team for Exercise "Allied Effort '01" and an evaluator of the CJTF HQ for Exercise "Strong Resolve '02". He also acted as liaison officer for the CJTF HQ COMSTRIKFLTLANT (Commander Striking Fleet Atlantic) stationed in Norfolk.

Back in France, he was appointed as the commander of Reims Air force base, integrating the Mirage F1CR squadrons under his command into ISAF in Afghanistan.

From 2004 to 2008 he was assigned to the French Air Force headquarters in Paris, as the head of the plans division and was nominated as a flag officer in 2007 as Acting Chief of Staff (ACOS) for budget and performance.

He then commanded the French Air Force Academy in Salon-de-Provence, where he was a transformative leader, fostering enduring partnerships with allies and prestigious universities.

Following his nomination as senior military advisor for the minister of Defence in 2010, General Mercier prepared and participated in all NATO ministerial meetings between 2010 and 2012, as well as the NATO summits of Lisbon and Chicago. Moreover, he was the minister's special advisor for Operation Unified Protector over Libya. He became the French Air Force Chief of Staff on September 17, 2012, which formalized his contact with Air Chiefs throughout the Alliance.

On 28 June 2013, he was named Commander of the French Legion of Honor.

He was confirmed by the North Atlantic Council as Supreme Allied Commander Transformation on 23 March 2015, date on which he has been awarded the rank of Grand Officer of the French Legion of Honor. He is also, among other distinctions, an officer of the National Order of Merit.

Mercier joined the board of German defence startup Helsing in 2022.

== Major military awards ==

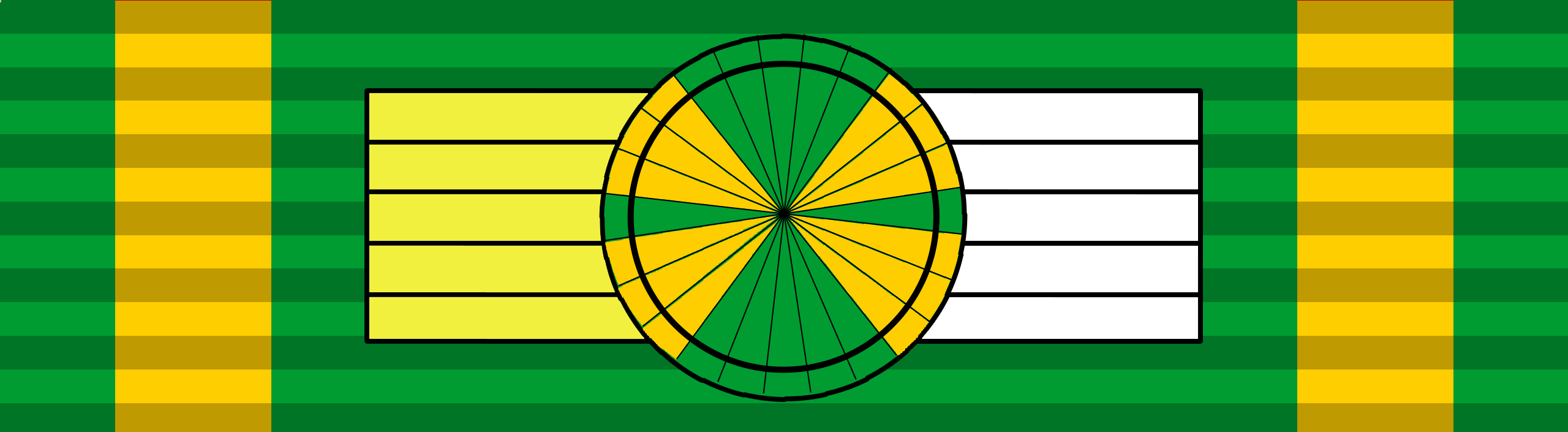

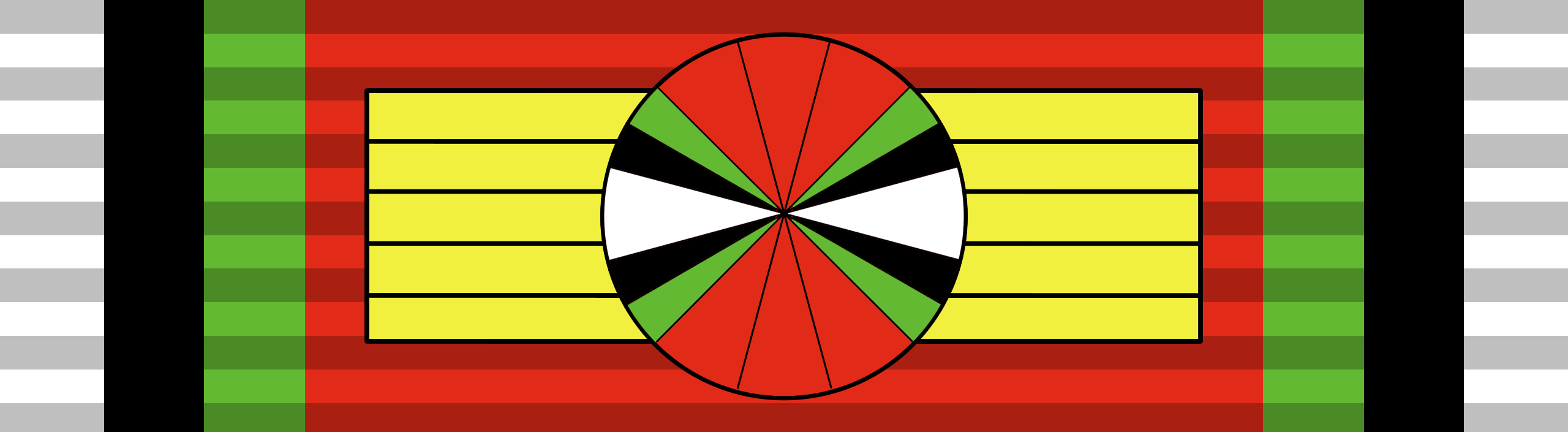

- Grand Officer of the Légion d'honneur (France)
- Officer of the Ordre national du Mérite (France)
- Médaille de l'Aéronautique (France)
- Croix du Combattant (France)
- Overseas Medal with two bars (France)
- National Defence Medal (gold grade) with bar (France)
- Medal of the Nation's Gratitude with bar (France)
- Médaille commémorative française with bar (France)
- Order of Abdulaziz al Saud, Second Class (Saudi Arabia)
- Commander of the Order of the Crown (Belgium)
- Unidentified decoration with gold disc and gold star
- Pingat Jasa Gemilang (Tentera) (Singapore)
- Meritorious Service Medal (Canada) (Military version)
- Polish Army Medal in bronze
- Military Merit Order, Grand Cross (United Arab Emirates)
- Grand Officer of the Order of Aeronautical Merit (Brazil)
- Bundeswehr Cross of Honour in Gold (Germany)
- Order of Merit of the Italian Republic, Grand Officer
- Cross of Aeronautical Merit, White Grand Cross (Spain)
- Unidentified
- NATO Meritorious Service Medal with bar

Military offices
Preceded by Jean-Paul Paloméros	Chief of Staff of the French Air Force; 17 September 2012 – 21 September 2015	Succeeded by André Lanata
Preceded by Jean-Paul Paloméros	Allied Command Transformation; 30 September 2015 – 11 September 2018	Succeeded by André Lanata
