= Jean-Loup Chrétien =

French astronaut (born 1938)

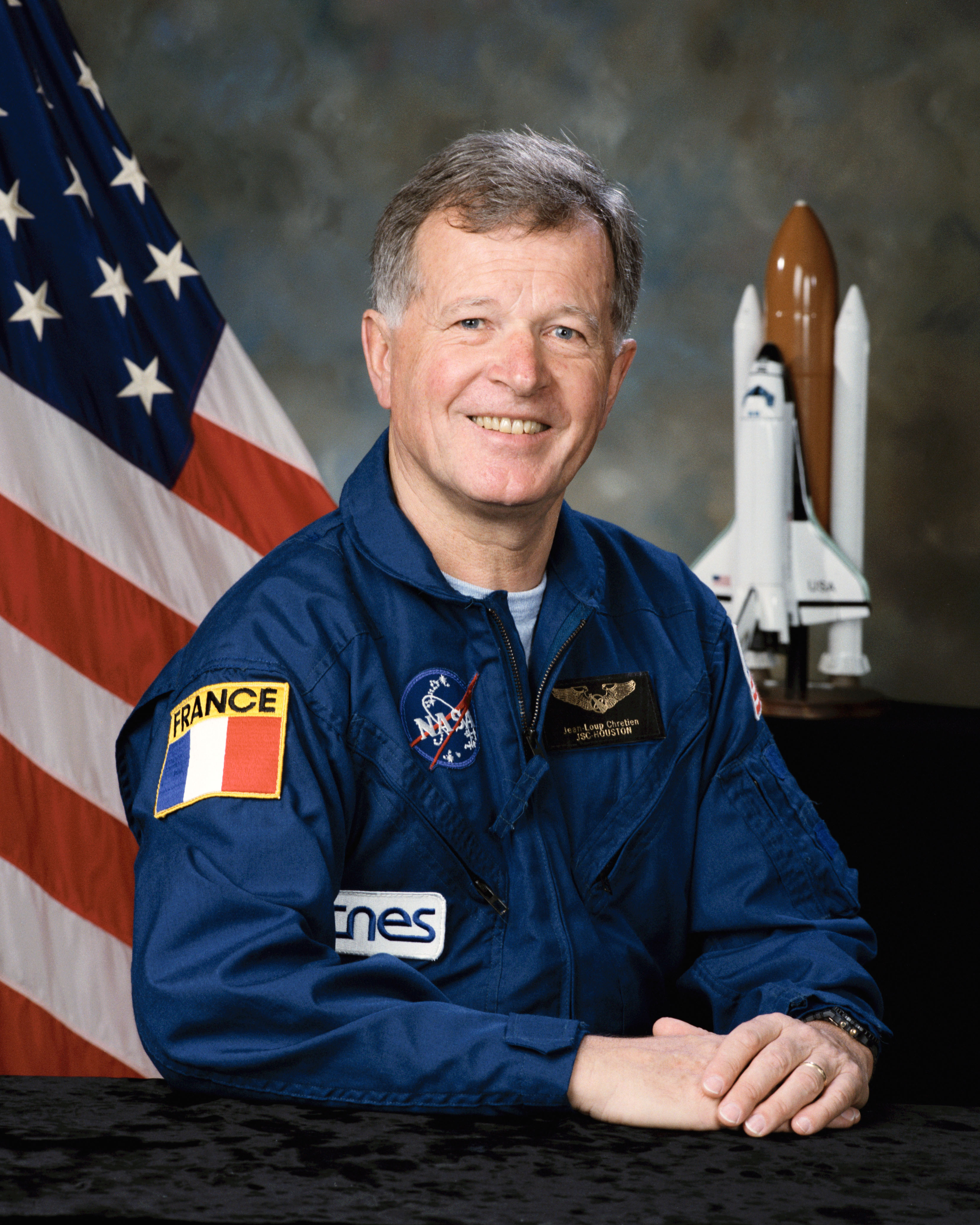
- Born: 20 August 1938 (age 88); La Rochelle, France
- Occupation: Fighter pilot
- Space career

CNES spationaut
- Status: Retired
- Rank: Général de Brigade, Armée de l'Air
- Time in space: 43d 11h 19min
- Selection: 1980 CNES Group 1, NASA Group 15 (1994)
- Total EVAs: 1
- Total EVA time: 5 hours, 57 minutes
- Missions: Soyuz T-6; Soyuz TM-7 / Mir Aragatz / Soyuz TM-6; STS-86
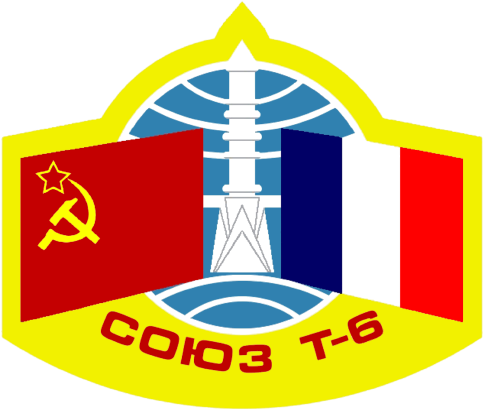
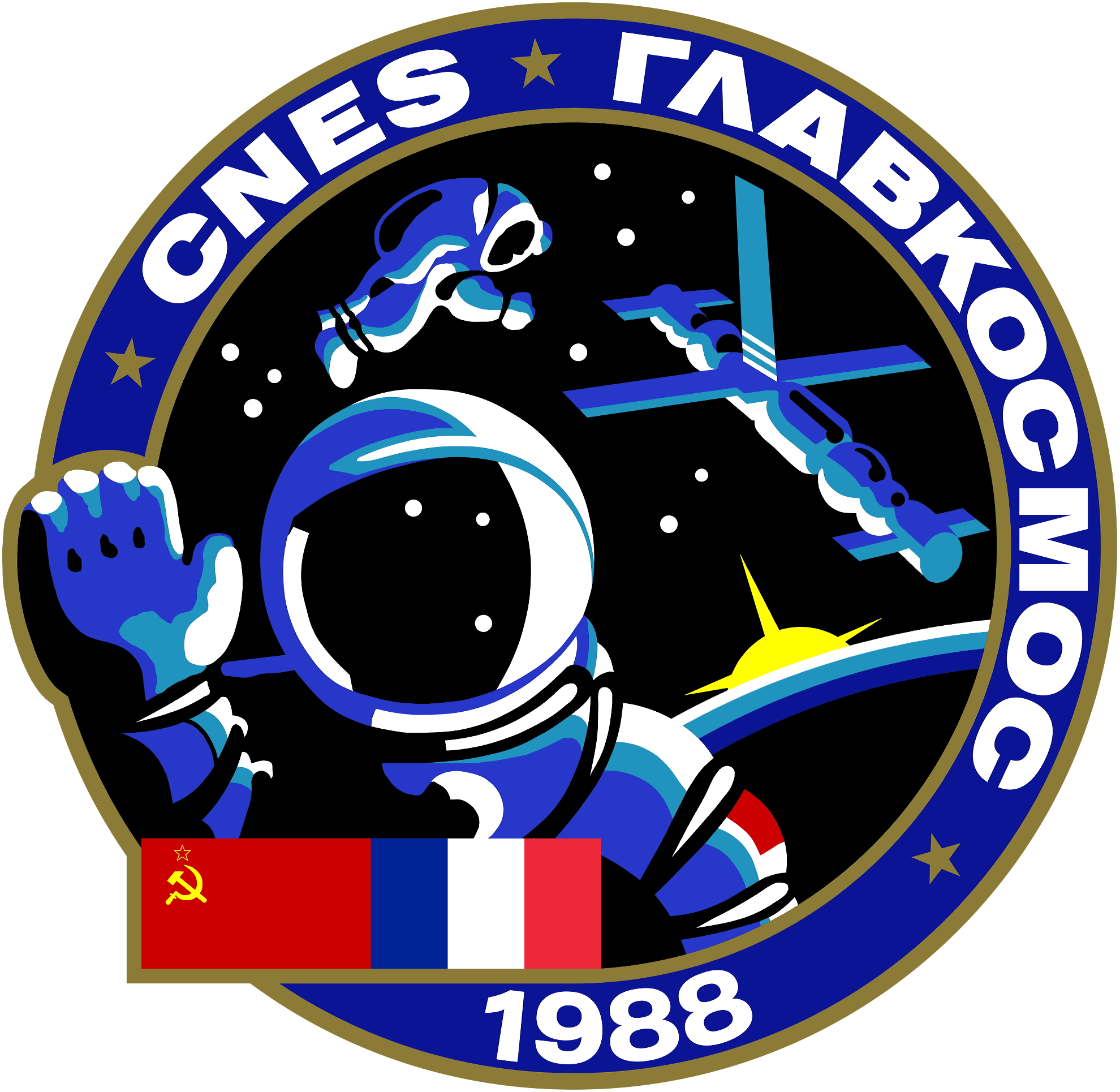
- Mission insignia

Jean-Loup Jacques Marie Chrétien (French: [ʒɑ̃ lup kʁetjɛ̃]; born 20 August 1938) is a French retired Général de Brigade (brigadier general) in the Armée de l'Air (French air force), and a former CNES spationaut. He flew on two Franco-Soviet space missions and a NASA Space Shuttle mission. Chrétien was the first Frenchman and the first western European in space.

== Personal life ==
Chrétien was born in the town of La Rochelle, France. He was married to and then divorced from Amy Kristine Jensen of New Canaan, Connecticut, and had five children. His father, Jacques, was a Navy sailor, and his mother, the former Marie-Blanche Coudurier, was a housewife. Chrétien is fluent in French, English and Russian.

== Education ==
Chrétien was educated at the École communale in Ploujean, the Collège Saint-Charles in Saint-Brieuc, and the Lycée de Morlaix. He entered the École de l'Air (the French Air Force Academy) at Salon-de-Provence and graduated in 1961, receiving a master's degree in aeronautical engineering.

== Organizations ==
- Member of the board of the Académie de l'air et de l'espace, and the Musée de l'air et de l'espace.
- Former counselor for Space Activities (Manned) to the President of Dassault Aviation.
- Member of the American Institute of Aeronautics and Astronautics, the International Academy of Astronautics, and the Association of Space Explorers.
- Member of the Board of Brit Air, an airline in his hometown, Morlaix.
- Honorary fellow of the Society of Experimental Test Pilots.

== Awards and honors ==
- Title of Hero of the Soviet Union (on 2 July 1982)
- Order of Lenin
- Order of the Red Banner of Labour
- Commandeur de la Légion d'Honneur (Commander of the Order of the Legion of Honour)
- Chevalier de l'Ordre National du Mérite (Knight of the National Order of Merit)
- Titulaire de la Médaille de l'Aéronautique (Holder of the Aeronautics Medal)
- Honorary citizenship of Arkalyk, Kazakhstan

== Career ==
Chrétien received his fighter pilot/pilot-engineer wings in 1962, after one year of training on Mystère IVs. He was promoted to lieutenant, and joined the 5th Fighter Wing in Orange, in the southeast of France, where he served for seven years as a fighter pilot in an operational squadron flying Super-Mystere B2 and then Mirage III interceptors. In 1970, he was assigned to the French test pilots school, EPNER (École du personnel navigant d'essais et de réception), then served as a test pilot at the Istres-Le Tubé Air Base for seven years. During that time he was responsible for supervising the flight test program for the Mirage F-1 fighter. In 1977–1978, he was appointed deputy commander of the South Air Defence Division in Aix-en-Provence, and he served in this position until his selection as a cosmonaut in June 1980. Chrétien remained a French Air Force officer but was placed on detachment to CNES for his space flight activities ensuring his availability for future flights with the Space Shuttle (NASA), Mir (Soviet Union) or Spacelab (ESA). He has accumulated over 8,000 hours of flying time in various aircraft, including Tupolev-154, MiG-25, Sukhoi Su-26, and Sukhoi Su-27. A veteran of three space flights, Chrétien was the tenth Interkosmos cosmonaut, and has spent a total of 43 days, 11 hours, 18 minutes, 42 seconds in space, including an extra-vehicular activity (EVA) of 5 hours, 57 minutes.

In April 1979, the Soviet Union offered France the opportunity to fly a cosmonaut on board a joint Soviet-French space flight, along the same lines as the agreement to fly non-Soviet cosmonauts from member countries of the Interkosmos program. The offer was accepted, and France began a spationaut selection process in September 1979. Chrétien was one of two finalists named on 12 June 1980. He started training at the Yuri Gagarin Cosmonaut Training Center in September 1980. The following year, he was named as the research cosmonaut for the prime crew of the Soyuz T-6 mission.

Soyuz T-6 was launched on 24 June 1982, and Chrétien, Vladimir Dzhanibekov and Aleksandr Ivanchenkov linked up with Salyut 7 and joined the crew of Anatoli Berezovoy and Valentin Lebedev already on board. They spent nearly seven days carrying out a program of joint Soviet-French experiments, including a series of French echography cardiovascular monitoring system experiments, before returning to Earth after a flight lasting 7 days, 21 hours, 50 minutes, and 42 seconds. This flight made him the first Western non-American to go to space, as well as the first Western European. Following the mission he was appointed chief of the CNES Astronaut Office.

Chrétien was selected as the back-up crew member for STS-51-G (Patrick Baudry, another CNES astronaut, flew on that mission). During 1984–1985, he participated in mission training at the Johnson Space Center.

Chrétien made his second space flight as a research cosmonaut on board Soyuz TM-7, which launched on 26 November 1988. Together with Alexander Alexandrovich Volkov and Sergei Krikalev, he linked up with Mir and joined the crew of Vladimir Titov, Musa Manarov and Valeriy Polyakov already on board. They spent 22 days carrying out a program of joint Soviet-French experiments, including a 5-hour, 57-minute, and 46 second EVA by Volkov and Chrétien during which the two men installed the French ERA experimental deployable structure and a panel of material samples. In making the EVA, he became the first non-American and non-Soviet to walk in space. In addition, he was the first non-Soviet cosmonaut to make a second space flight aboard a Soviet spacecraft. The mission lasted 24 days, 18 hours, and 7 minutes.

During 1990–1993, Chrétien participated in Buran spacecraft pilot training at the Moscow Joukovski Institute.

In 1994, he was selected as part of NASA Astronaut Group 15 to officially become an International Mission Specialist with NASA.

Chrétien attended ASCAN Training at the Johnson Space Center during 1995. He was initially assigned to work on technical issues for the Operations Planning Branch of the Astronaut Office. He served on the crew of STS-86 Atlantis (25 September to 6 October 1997) the seventh mission to rendezvous and dock with the Russian Space Station Mir. Highlights included the delivery of a Mir attitude control computer, the exchange of U.S. crew members Mike Foale and David Wolf, a spacewalk by Scott E. Parazynski and Vladimir Titov to retrieve four experiments first deployed on Mir during the STS-76 docking mission, the transfer to Mir of 4,700 kg (10,400 lb) of science and logistics, and the return of experiment hardware and results to Earth. Mission duration was 10 days, 19 hours, and 21 minutes.

In September 2000, while visiting a Home Depot store in Webster, Texas, he was hit by a 31 kg (68 lb) drill press that fell from a shelf more than 3 m (9.8 ft) above him. The injuries to his neck, head, and shoulders were severe enough that a NASA flight surgeon determined that Chrétien could no longer fly. He was forced to retire from the space program in 2001. He filed a US$15 million lawsuit against Home Depot several months after the accident. The company settled the suit in 2002. The terms of the settlement are protected by a confidentiality agreement. Chrétien is currently working for Tietronix Software as the vice president of research and development in Houston, Texas.

== Books ==
- Jean-Loup Chrétien, Patrick Baudry and Bernard Chabbert, Spatiale premier: the first French in space, Paris, Plon, 1982, 306 p. ISBN 978-2-259-00927-0
- Jean-Loup Chrétien, Sonata au clair de terre: Itinerary of a Frenchman in space, Paris, Denoël, coll. "Mediations", 1993, 232 p. ISBN 2-207-24153-X
- Jean-Loup Chrétien, Mission Mir: Logbook, Paris, Michel Lafon, coll. "Documents", 1998, ISBN 978-2-84098-374-3
- Jean-Loup Chrétien, Catherine Alric, Dreams of stars, Paris, Alphée, coll. "Documents", 2009, 236 p. ISBN 978-2-7538-0385-5 BnF 414559361
- Jean-Loup Chrétien, Roman Gurbanov, Programming with Python in Minecraft, Moscow, Litres, 2020, 148 p. ISBN 978-5-532-99551-2
- Jean-Loup Chrétien, Roman Gurbanov, Python from Scratch. Soyuz-T6 Space Expedition: 41st anniversary edition, Litres, 2023, 100 p. ISBN 979-8-22385-304-6
