= Jean-Paul Paloméros =

French general

Jean-Paul Paloméros

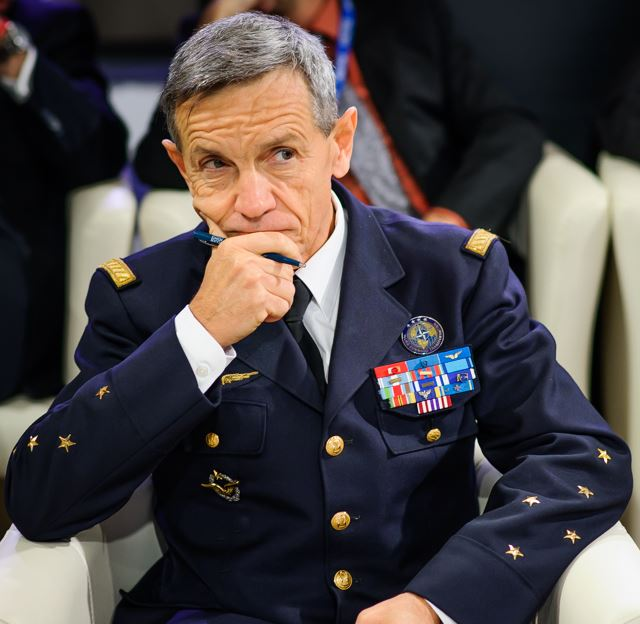
- Paloméros at the Halifax International Security Forum
- Born: 13 August 1953 (age 73); Paris, France
- Military career
- Allegiance: France
- Branch: French Air Force
- Service years: 1976 – 2015
- Rank: général d'armée aérienne
- Commands: Supreme Allied Commander Transformation NATO
- Conflicts: Opération Épervier; Operation Crécerelle; Operation Deny Flight
- Awards: Grand Officier de la Légion d'Honneur Grand-Croix de l'Ordre National du Mérite Médaille de l'Aéronautique

Jean-Paul Paloméros (born 13 August 1953 in Paris) is a retired general of the French Air Force and served as Supreme Allied Commander Transformation, a senior military post in NATO. Paloméros previously served as Chief of Staff of the French Air Force from 2009 to 2012.

== Air force career ==
In 1973, he joined l'École de l'Air, the French Air Force Academy and qualified as a fighter pilot in 1976. He acquired extensive experience both as an operational commander and as a fighter pilot, having flown 82 combat missions and more than 3,500 flying hours, mostly on Mirage F1C and Mirage 2000 aircraft.

He led the 2/12 Picardy Squadron in Cambrai for the 1987 Epervier operational deployment in Chad and in 1990 the 30th Fighter Wing in Reims.

In 1993, Palomeros graduated from the Royal Air Force Staff College, Bracknell in Britain, where he was awarded the Curtis Prize by Britain's Chief of the Air Staff.

From 1996 to 1998, he was appointed as Commander of Cazaux Air Base. This base hosts one of the main French flight test centres, several advanced French flying training squadrons and a permanently stationed Singaporean training Squadron.

Palomeros has also been deployed in Vicenza, Italy (1993) as Deputy Commander of the French Air Force during Operation "Crecerelle", as well as in Operation Deny Flight, and then in Kiseljak, Bosnia-Herzegovina (1995) where he was in charge of coordinating the air-ground campaign during Operation Deliberate Force.

He headed the "Studies and Strategic Plans" Department of the French Air Force Staff in 1998. After being promoted to Brigadier General in 2001, he was appointed as Chairman of the Capability Development Committee within the French Joint Staff and in August 2002 became the Head of the Plans and Program Division.

Paloméros was appointed Vice-Chief of Staff of the French Air Force, in April 2005. After being promoted general, he went on to serve as Air Force Chief of Staff from 2009 to 2012. At the end of his time in the senior French Air Force appointment, Paloméros was confirmed by the NATO Council as Supreme Allied Commander Transformation on 6 August 2012 and assumed Command in Norfolk, Virginia, on 28 September 2012.

== Major military awards ==

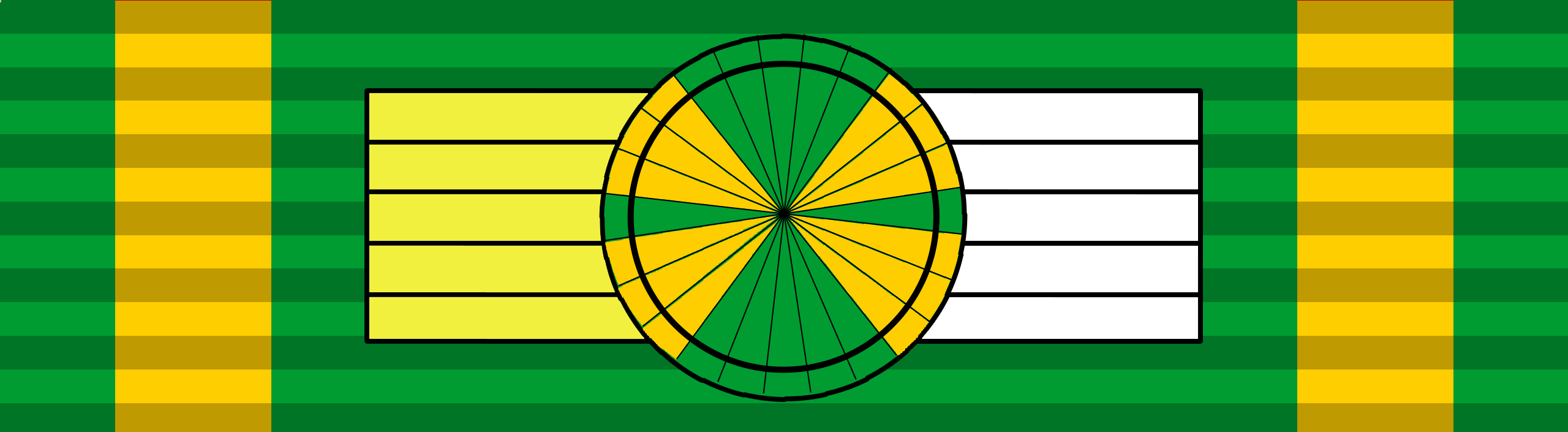

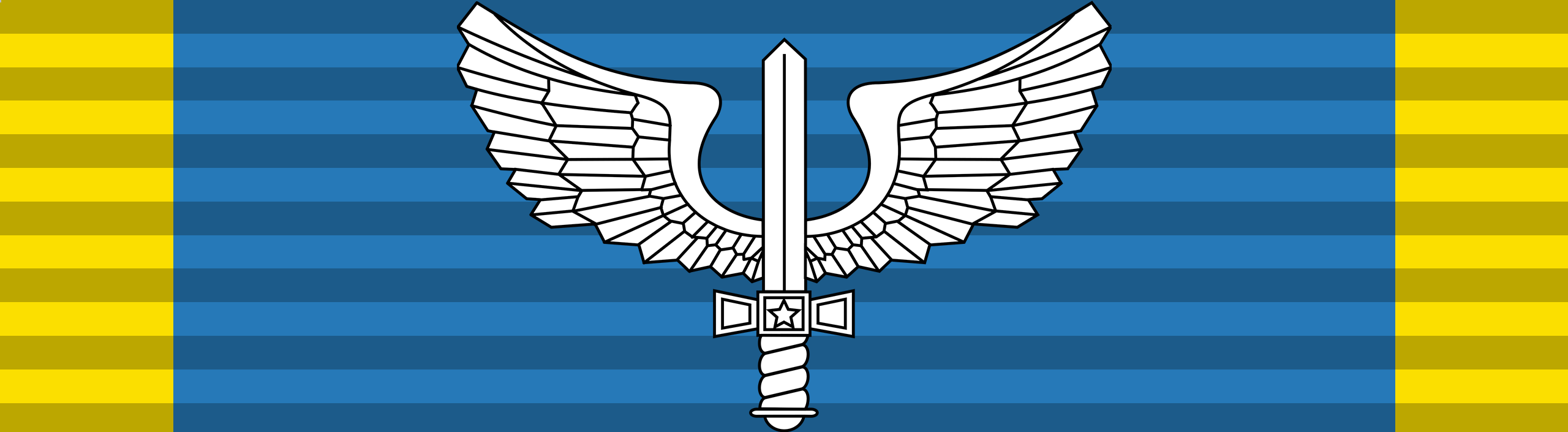

- Grand Officer of the Légion d'honneur (France, 2009)
- Grand Cross of the Ordre national du Mérite (France, 2016)
- Médaille de l'Aéronautique (France)
- Overseas Medal with bar (France)
- Médaille commémorative française with bar
- Médaille de la Jeunesse et des Sports in bronze (France)
- UN Medal Bosnia (UNPROFOR)
- NATO Medal with bar (Former Yugoslavia)
- Cross of Aeronautical Merit, White Grand Cross (Spain)
- Grand Cross of the Order of Rio Branco (Brazil)
- Order of Abdulaziz al Saud, First Class (Saudi Arabia)
- Meritorious Service Medal
- NATO Meritorious Service Medal
- Santos-Dumont Medal of Merit (Medalha do Mérito Santos Dumont), Brazilian Air Force
- Chilean Grand Cross of the Order of Aeronautical Merit
- Pingat Jasa Gemilang (Tentera) (Singapore)
- Romanian Honor Emblem
- Russian Order of Friendship of Peoples
- Allied Long Service Decoration (Hungary)
- PSA - The Presidential Sports Award (United States)

Military offices
Preceded by Stéphane Abrial	Chief of Staff of the French Air Force; 24 August 2009 – 16 September 2012	Succeeded by Denis Mercier
Preceded by Stéphane Abrial	Supreme Allied Commander Transformation; 28 September 2012 – 30 September 2015	Succeeded by Denis Mercier
