= École de l'air et de l'espace =

Air Force academy in Salon-de-Provence, France

Coordinates: 43°37′09″N 5°06′36″E

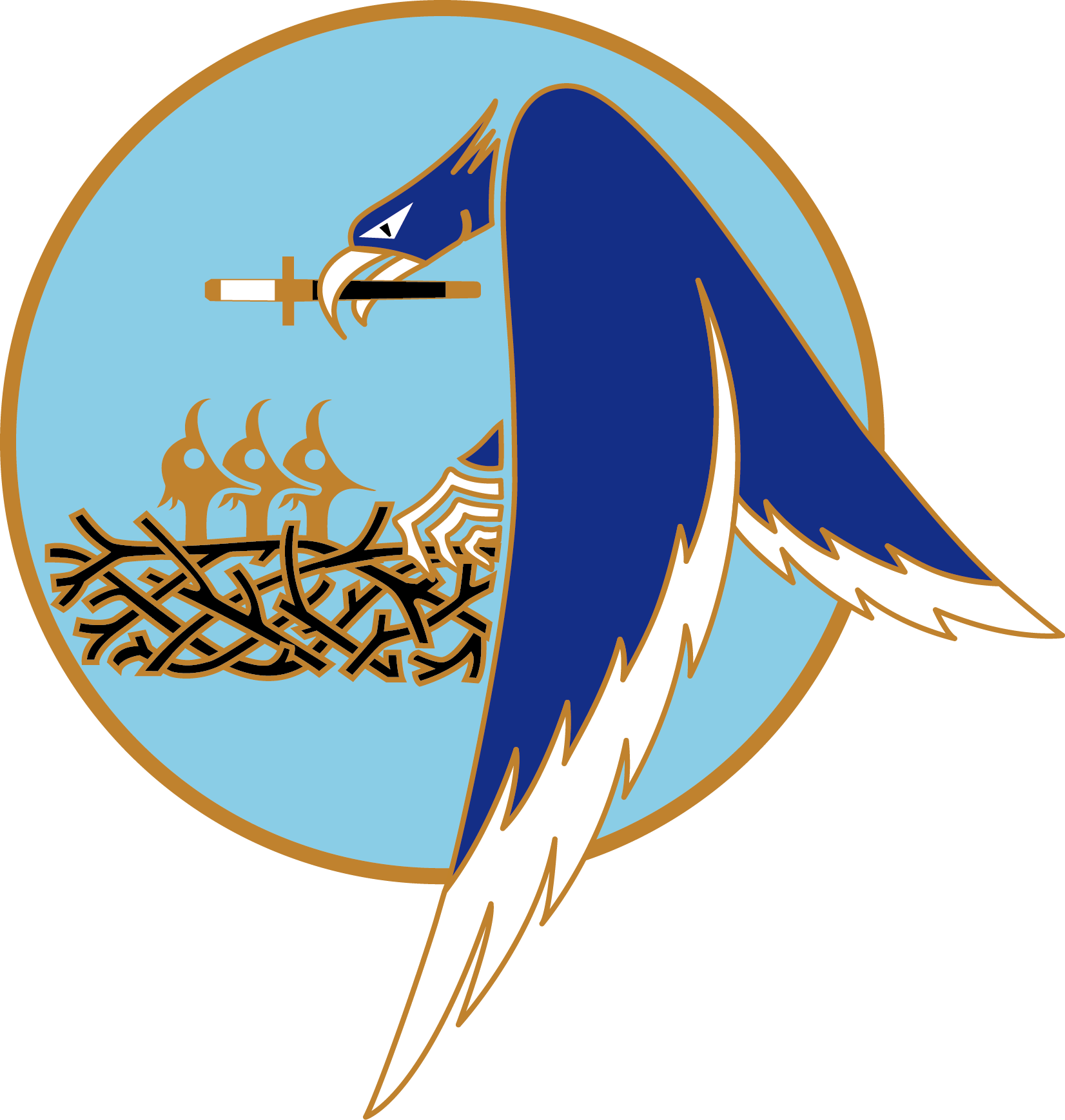
- School crest
- Other name: EAE
- Motto: « Faire face » (French) (also motto of the French Air and Space Force)
- Motto in English: « Face honestly, truthfully & correctly straight forward »
- Type: Air Force Academy, Grande École
- Established: 1933
- Affiliations: CDEFI, CGE, PEGASUS
- Rector: Brigadier General Pierre Réal
- Director: Brigadier General Pierre Réal
- Students: 500
- Location: Salon-de-Provence, Provence-Alpes-Côte d'Azur, France
- Website: www.ecole-air-espace.fr

The École de l'air et de l'espace (French pronunciation: [ekɔl də lɛʁ e də lɛspas]) is a military academy and grande école of French Air and Space Force to train its officers. It is located at Salon-de-Provence Air Base in Salon-de-Provence, France.

== History ==
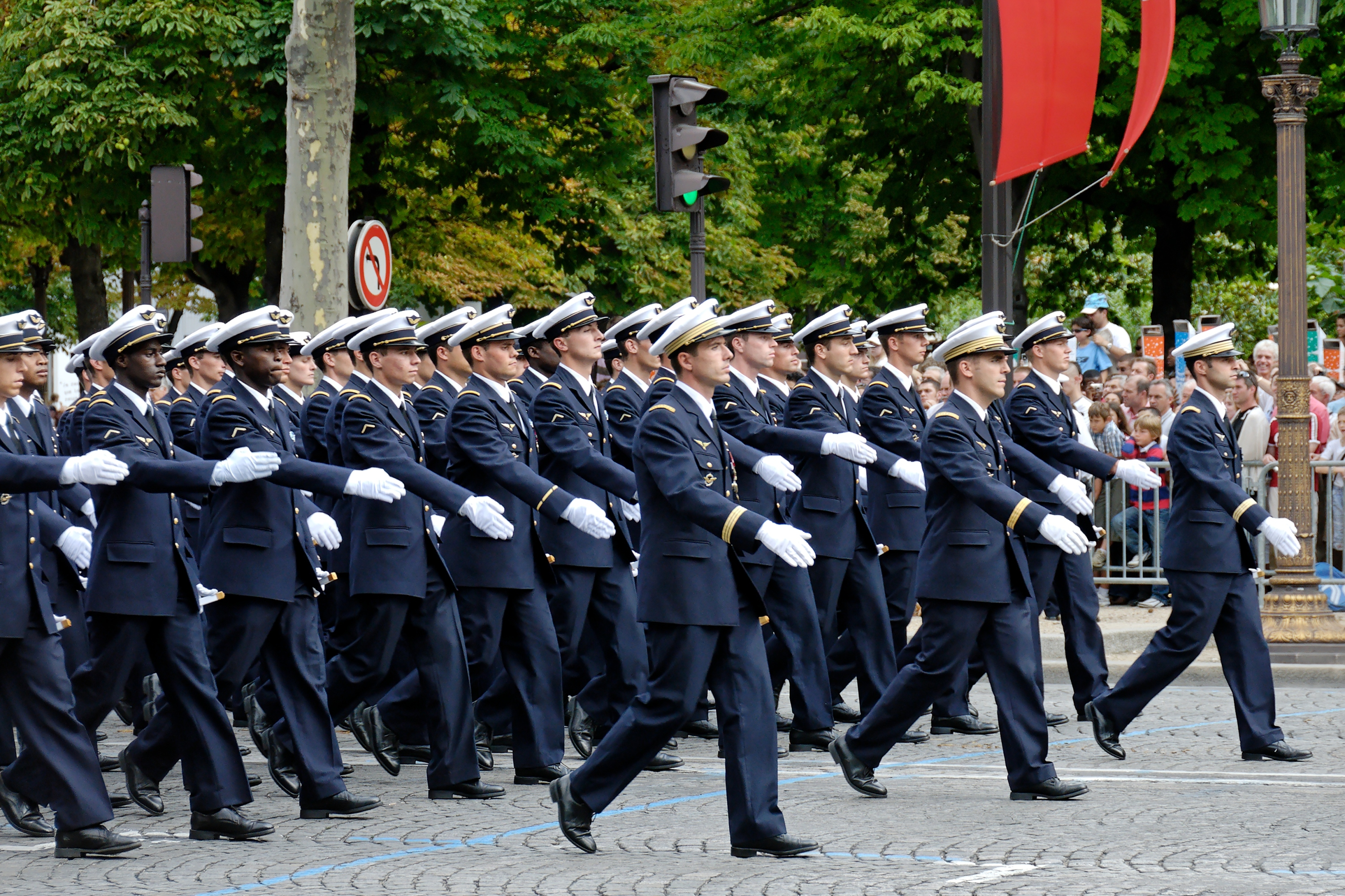
École de l'air et de l'espace students at Bastille Day 2007

In 1922, the École du génie (School of Engineering) of Versailles was entrusted with the mission to train all officers and aircrew in aeronautics.

The École militaire et d'application de l'Aéronautique (Military and Aeronautical School) was set up in 1925. The officer cadets from the non-commissioned officers' corps and young officers from the École Spéciale Militaire de Saint-Cyr and École Polytechnique attended training at Versailles for two years. For pilots, their training then continues at Avord and then Cazaux, where they train in aerial combat and bombing.

President Albert Lebrun created the École de l'air et de l'espace by Presidential decree in 1933. The school's first class began training November 4, 1935. The school's motto, Faire Face ("Overcoming") is a tribute to Capitaine Georges Guynemer, a World War I fighter ace.

In 1937, the school moved into still-unfinished buildings in Salon, Bouches-du-Rhône. The outbreak of World War II forced the school to relocate several times from 1939 to 1945, to sites including Bordeaux, Collioure, and Marrakesh. It was not until 1946 that the school returned to the now-completed campus at Salon. The school received the Legion of Honor and the Croix de Guerre from President Vincent Auriol in 1947.

Other specialized schools joined the École de l'air et de l'espace, including the École du commissariat de l'Air, which trains administrative, legal, and financial officers, in 1953, and the Cours Spécial de l'École de l'air (CSEA), which trains exchange cadets from French-speaking African countries, in 1973.

In 1969, the École de l'air began an exchange program with the United States Air Force Academy, for eight cadets per school each year.

The school first accepted women in 1976.

Since 2008, the École de l'air et de l'espace also proposes two mastères spécialisés courses in aviation safety aircraft airworthiness and aerospace project management in partnership with the École nationale de l'aviation civile and the Institut Supérieur de l'Aéronautique et de l'Espace.

In 2015, the École de l'air launched a MOOC titled Compréhension de l'Arme Aérienne (Understanding Air Power) on France Université Numérique's platform.

In 2021 the École de l'air was renamed École de l'air et de l'espace, following the renaming of the Armée de l'air to Armée de l'air et de l'espace.

== Notable alumni ==
- Stéphane Abrial, French General who is the previous Commander of Allied Command Transformation
- Caroline Aigle, first woman fighter pilot in the French Air Force
- Patrick Baudry, retired Lieutenant Colonel in the French Air Force and a former CNES astronaut
- Jean-Loup Chrétien, former CNES spationaut
- Olivier Dassault, former French politician and billionaire businessman, who served as a deputy in the National Assembly.
- Léopold Eyharts, ESA astronaut
- Jean-Pierre Haigneré, French Air Force officer and a former CNES spationaut
- Fleury Marius, French aviator
- Francis Pollet, Director of the Institut Polytechnique des Sciences Avancées
- Jacques Rosay, Vice President Chief Test Pilot of the aircraft manufacturer Airbus
- Michel Tognini, French test pilot, brigadier general in the French Air Force, and a former CNES and ESA astronaut
