= Louis Pailhas =

French public servant (1926–2021)

- Born: 2 March 1926; Foix
- Died: 6 February 2021 (aged 94); Muret
- Citizenship: French
- Education: Aerospace engineer
- Alma mater: Lycée Louis-le-Grand; École Polytechnique; École nationale de l'aviation civile
- Occupations: Councillor of Bouilh-Devant and member of the Académie de l'air et de l'espace
- Years active: 1951 - 1990 (39 years)
- Employer: Direction Générale de l'Aviation Civile
- Known for: Director-General of the École nationale de l'aviation civile
- Predecessor: Gilbert Manuel
- Successor: André Sarreméjean

Louis Pailhas (French pronunciation: [lwi pajas]; 2 March 1926 – 6 February 2021) was a French public servant. From December 1967 to 1982, he was the director-general of the École nationale de l'aviation civile (French civil aviation university).

== Biography ==
Pailhas was born in Foix. After high school studies at the Lycée Pierre-de-Fermat in Toulouse and the classe préparatoire aux grandes écoles at the lycée Louis-le-Grand in Paris, he graduated from the École Polytechnique (X 46) and École nationale de l'aviation civile (IAC 49). He began his career as a civil aviation engineer in Morocco from 1951 to 1956 and then to the board of directors of the direction du secrétariat général de l'aviation civile et commerciale until 1959. The same year he was appointed director of the air navigation regional center of Orly, a position he held until 1965. Deputy Director (1965) of the École nationale de l'aviation civile, he was appointed director of the university in December 1967, the first to hold that position in Toulouse. He resigned in January 1982. After that, he was nominated air navigation director at the Ministry of Ecology, Sustainable Development, Transport and Housing. He retired in 1990.

In 1998, he was assistant of the Mayor Dominique Baudis for the city of Toulouse and then deputy Mayor for science, aeronautics and space activities in 2001.

From 16 March 2008 till 15 March 2014, he was councillor of Bouilh-Devant.

Louis Pailhas died in Muret on 6 February 2021, twenty-four days short of his 95th birthday.

Louis Pailhas was member of the Académie de l'air et de l'espace.

== Awards ==
- Ordre national du Mérite
- Legion of Honour
- Médaille de l'Aéronautique

== Bibliography ==
- Académie nationale de l'air et de l'espace and Lucien Robineau, Les français du ciel, dictionnaire historique, Le Cherche midi, June 2005, 782 p. (ISBN 2-7491-0415-7)
