= Pailhas =

Pailhas is a surname. Notable people with the surname include:

- Géraldine Pailhas (born 1971), French actress
- Louis Pailhas (1926–2021), French public servant
