= Les Épines de Lespinet =

Botanical garden in Midi-Pyrénées, France

Coordinates: 42°57′59″N 1°36′28″E

Les Épines de Lespinet (2500 m^{2}) is a private botanical garden specializing in cactus and succulents. It is located at 38, Les Hauts de Lespinet, Foix, Ariège, Midi-Pyrénées, France, and open by guided tours; an admission fee is charged.

The garden is intended to recreate a semi-desert American landscape amid banana, citrus, and Mediterranean vegetation. It contains nearly 400 taxa of cacti and succulents, primarily Agave, Opuntia, and Yucca, as well as Nolina and a collection of palm trees from temperate and subtropical regions.

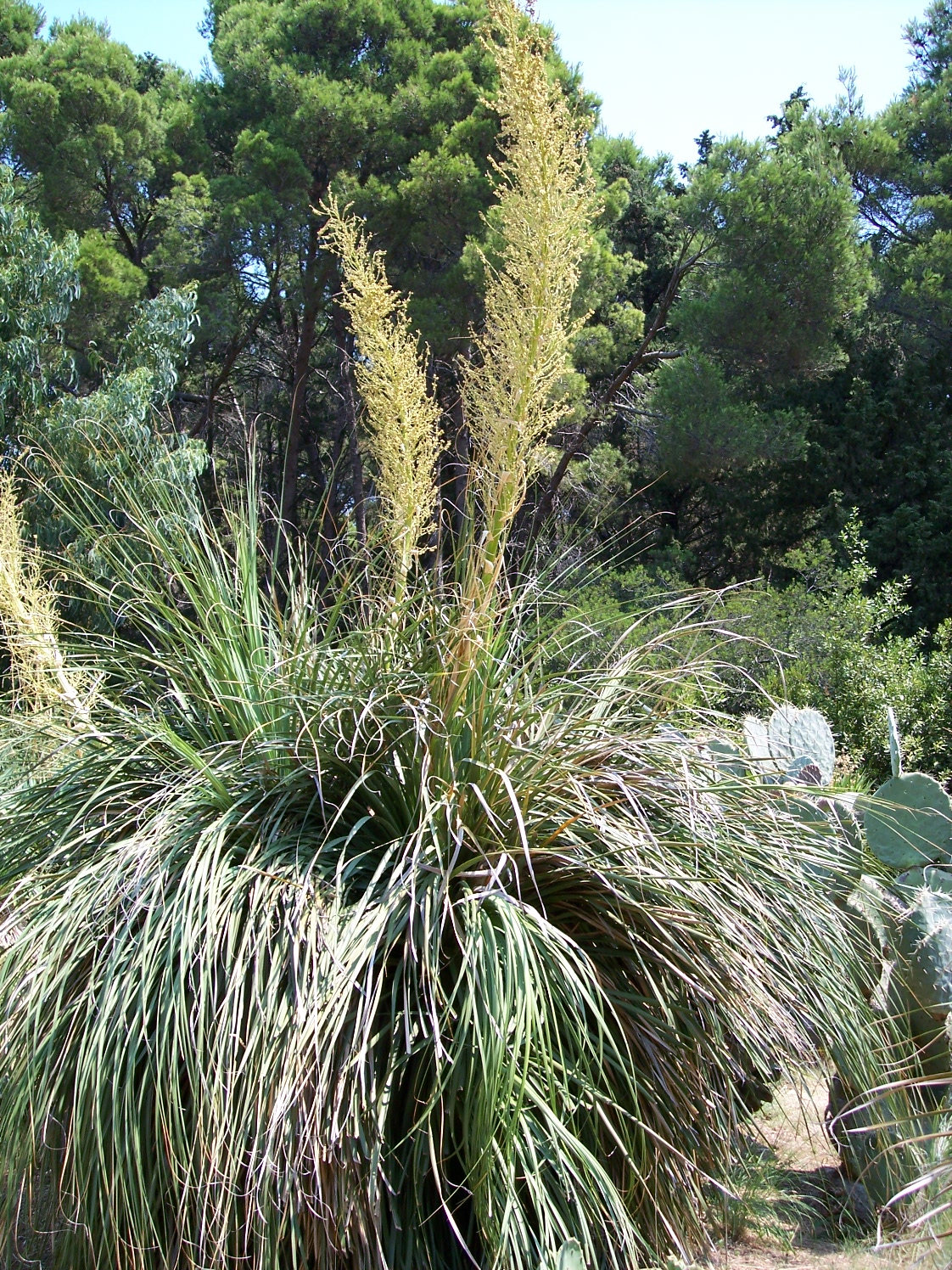
Les Épines de Lespinet

== See also ==
- List of botanical gardens in France
