= Jacques Rosay =

- Born: 11 March 1949; Valréas, France
- Died: 12 June 2015 (aged 66); France
- Education: École de l'Air
- Occupation: Test Pilot
- Employer: Airbus

Jacques Rosay was Vice President Chief Test Pilot of the aircraft manufacturer Airbus. He has piloted the maiden flights of several Airbus airliners, including the A318, A340-500, and A380 Superjumbo. He was born in 1949 in Valréas (Vaucluse), France, and died on 12 June 2015.

== Career ==
Prior to his work for Airbus, Rosay was a test pilot at the flight test center in Istres Air Base in southern France, where he flew almost 150 different aircraft models including the Rafale A and the Mirage 2000. Rosay then worked for the Joint Aviation Authorities in the course of certification efforts for various civil aircraft. He joined Airbus in 1995, and achieved the position of chief test pilot in 2000. During his career at Airbus, he was part of the crew of the first A380 test flight, the first prototype was named after him following his death.

Rosay had some 10,000 flight hours of experience, including 6,000 hours of test flights.
