= Gérard Brachet =

French space scientist (born 1944)

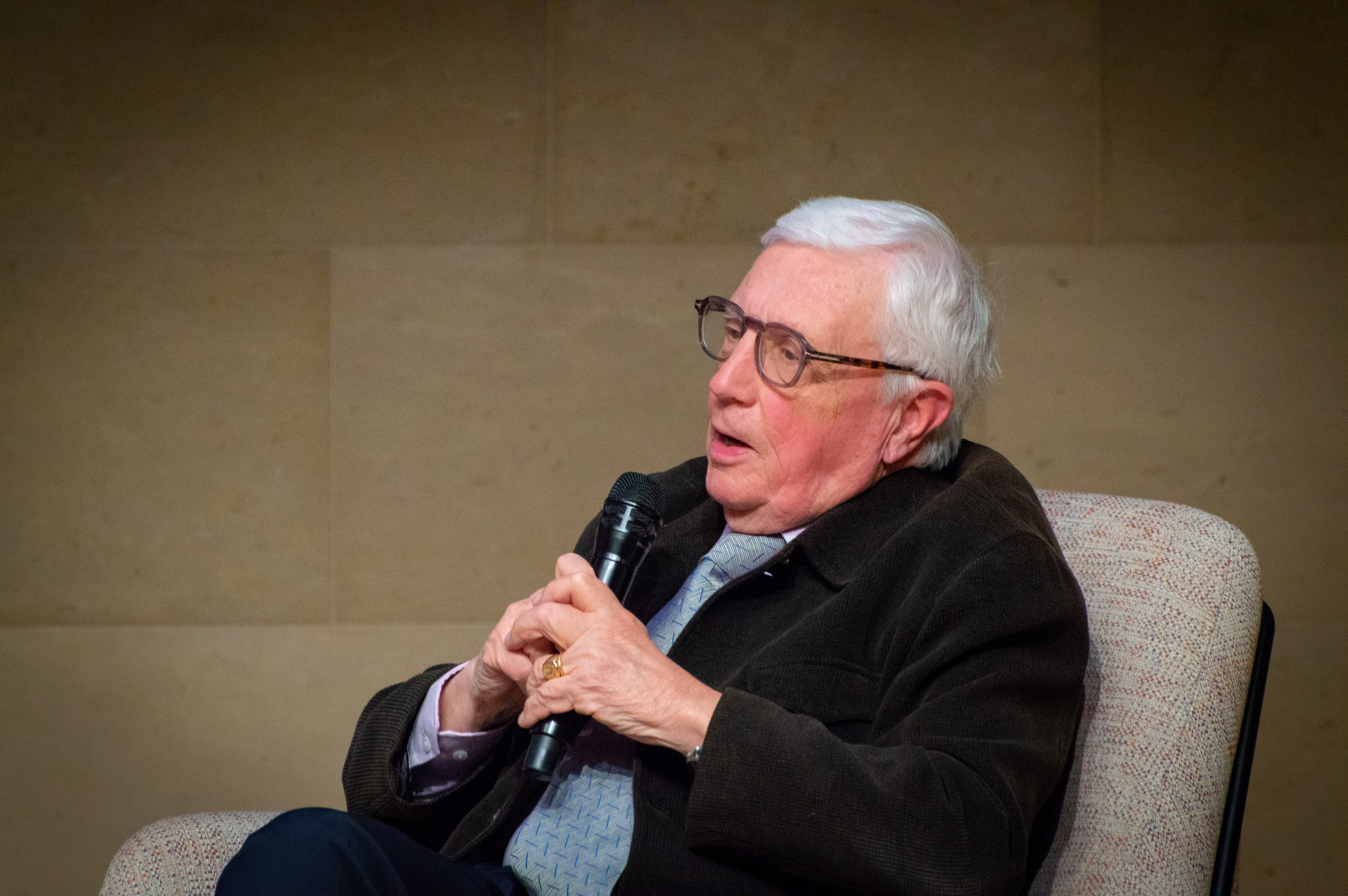
- Brachet in 2023
- Born: 27 October 1944 (age 81); Lyon, France
- Education: École Nationale Superieure d'Aeronautique, University of Washington
- Known for: Developing the French SPOT satellite programme
- Awards: Académie de l'air et de l'espace (French national Air and Space Academy), Ordre national du Mérite, Chevalier de la légion d'honneur, Brock Gold Medal Award of the International Society for Photogrammetry and Remote Sensing
- Scientific career
- Fields: Space science
- Institutions: Centre National d'Etudes Spatiales (CNES)

Gérard Brachet (born 27 October 1944) is a French space scientist.

== Career ==
Brachet earned an engineering degree from the Ecole Nationale Superieure d'Aeronautique in 1967 and a MS in Aeronautics and Astronautics from the University of Washington in 1968. He began his professional career at the Centre National d'Etudes Spatiales (CNES) in France, and from 1972 to 1982 was successively Head of the Orbit Determination and Spacecraft Dynamics Department, the Scientific Programmes Division and the Application Programmes Division. During this period he helped prepare and implement several major space programmes, at the European level and internationally. In particular he was the French signatory for the COSPAS-SARSAT programme for satellite-based search and rescue. He was also Chairman of ESA-PBEO, where he helped define the ERS-1 and ERS-2 EO programmes.

Brachet was directly involved in defining and developing the French SPOT satellite programme in 1978 and was principally responsible for setting up the SPOT IMAGE company to market their earth observation images. In 1982 Brachet was appointed chairman and chief executive officer of SPOT IMAGE and remained in this position until 1994. At the same time he was an advisor on space matters to the European Commission, and in 1991-2 he helped formulate space policy for the European Union.

From 1981 to 1989 Brachet was President of the Societe Française de Photogrammetrie et de Teledetection (French Society for Photogrammetry and Remote Sensing). In 1992 he received the Brock Gold Medal Award, a prize that is awarded every four years by the International Society for Photogrammetry and Remote Sensing. He is the only French person to have been distinguished in this way. In 1994, he received the Remote Sensing Society Award. He is a member of the International Astronautics Academy and a corresponding member of the Academie Nationale de l'Air et de l'Espace (National Air and Space Academy). Brachet is an Officier de l'Ordre national du Mérite (1997) and a Chevalier de la légion d'honneur (1986).

Brachet returned to CNES in 1994 where he was successively the Director for Programmes, Planning and Industrial Policy, and Scientific Director and Director General from July 1997 to December 2003. Brachet was also chairman of the international Committee on Earth Observation Satellites (CEOS), which gathers together 20 space agencies and 7 international organizations with the objective of coordinating Earth observation satellite programmes. Since January 2004 he has been an aerospace consultant. He served as a chairman of the United Nations Committee on the Peaceful Uses of Outer Space (COPUOS) from 2006 to 2007.
