= Caroline Aigle =

French Air Force officer (1974–2007)

- Aigle in 1999
- Born: 12 September 1974; Montauban, France
- Died: 21 August 2007 (aged 32); Dijon, France
- Military career
- Allegiance: France
- Branch: French Air Force
- Service years: 2000-2007
- Rank: Commandant
- Unit: 2/2 Squadron

Commandant Caroline Aigle (French pronunciation: [kaʁɔlin ɛɡl]; 12 September 1974 – 21 August 2007) was a French aviator who achieved a historical first when at the age of 25, she became the first woman fighter pilot in the French Air Force. Her promising military career was cut short by death from cancer seven years later. She was posthumously awarded the Médaille de l'Aéronautique (Aeronautics Medal).

== Background ==
Born in Montauban, Aigle spent her early years in Africa, where her father served as a military physician. After reaching her fourteenth birthday, she matriculated at the Lycée militaire de Saint-Cyr (Saint-Cyr Military High School), for the remaining three-year period from the second term until graduation. She subsequently proceeded to Prytanée Militaire, an advanced military high school and then to the military academy wing of the prestigious École Polytechnique, France's foremost school of engineering. During her first year (1994–1995), she fulfilled the requirements of her military duty while stationed with the 13th Battalion of the elite mountain infantry, the Chasseurs Alpins. She served her final year before graduation from the Polytechnique (1996–1997) in the École de l'Air, the French Air Force's officer candidate school.

== Career ==
After graduating from the Polytechnique, Aigle chose to join the French Air Force. On 28 May 1999, she became the first woman to receive the Air Force's coveted fighter pilot wings. She was assigned to the Mirage 2000-5 in the escadron 2/2 "Côte-d'Or" in 2000, and promoted to the rank of Commandant (roughly equivalent to Major) in 2005. Among the top candidates, she was also on the verge of being selected as an astronaut for the European Space Agency. By the time of her sudden death three weeks before her 33rd birthday (the cancer, a melanoma, had been diagnosed only a month earlier), she had accumulated a total of 1600 hours of flight time.

Aigle was a keen athlete and represented the Air Force in inter-service sports competitions. She was the 1997 French military champion in triathlon, followed by the 1997 triathlon world championship in military team competition. Still competing in 1999, she and her team won the triathlon world military vice-championship. She was also a skydiver and free-fall parachutist.

== Death ==
Aigle was pregnant when she was first diagnosed with rapidly progressing cancer and refused to undergo an abortion despite the increased difficulty in cancer treatment options. Her son Gabriel was delivered by caesarean section, five-and-a half months into term, fifteen days before her death on 21 August 2007. She and her husband already had one other child.

On 2 October 2007, President Sarkozy posthumously awarded her the Médaille de l'Aéronautique (Aeronautics Medal).

== Personal life ==
Aigle was married to Christophe "Douky" Deketelaere (born 27 September 1964), a former Air Force fighter pilot and deputy leader of the Breitling Jet Team. They had two sons, Marc and Gabriel.

== See also ==
- Marie Marvingt - the first woman to fly in combat for France.
