= Volusian of Tours =

Bishop of Tours from 491 to 498

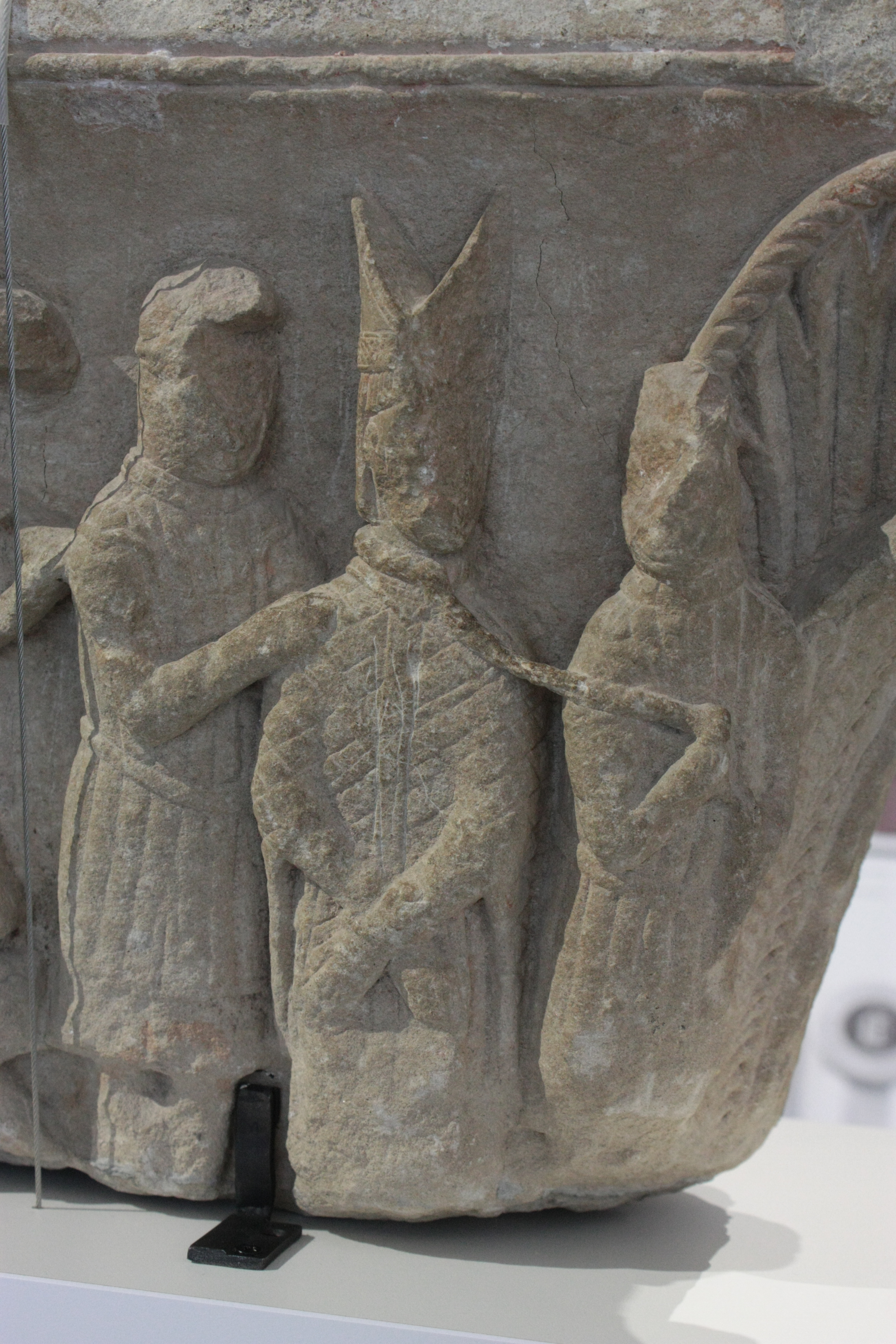

Volusian (French: Volusien) (Latin: Volusianus) was the seventh Bishop of Tours, from 491 to 498. He is venerated as a saint in the Catholic Church.

== Biography ==
Volusian came from a rich and pious senatorial family, and was a close relative of his predecessor Perpetuus, as well as of Ruricius of Limoges. He was deprived of his see by the Visigoths, exiled to Toulouse, and perhaps martyred.

His feast day is January 18. He is the patron saint of Foix.

== Bibliography ==
- History of the Franks, book X, by Gregory of Tours.

== See also ==
- Saint-Volusien, Foix
