= Saint-Volusien, Foix =

Abbatial church in Foix, France

Saint-Volusien abbatial church
- Abbatiale Saint-Volusien (French)
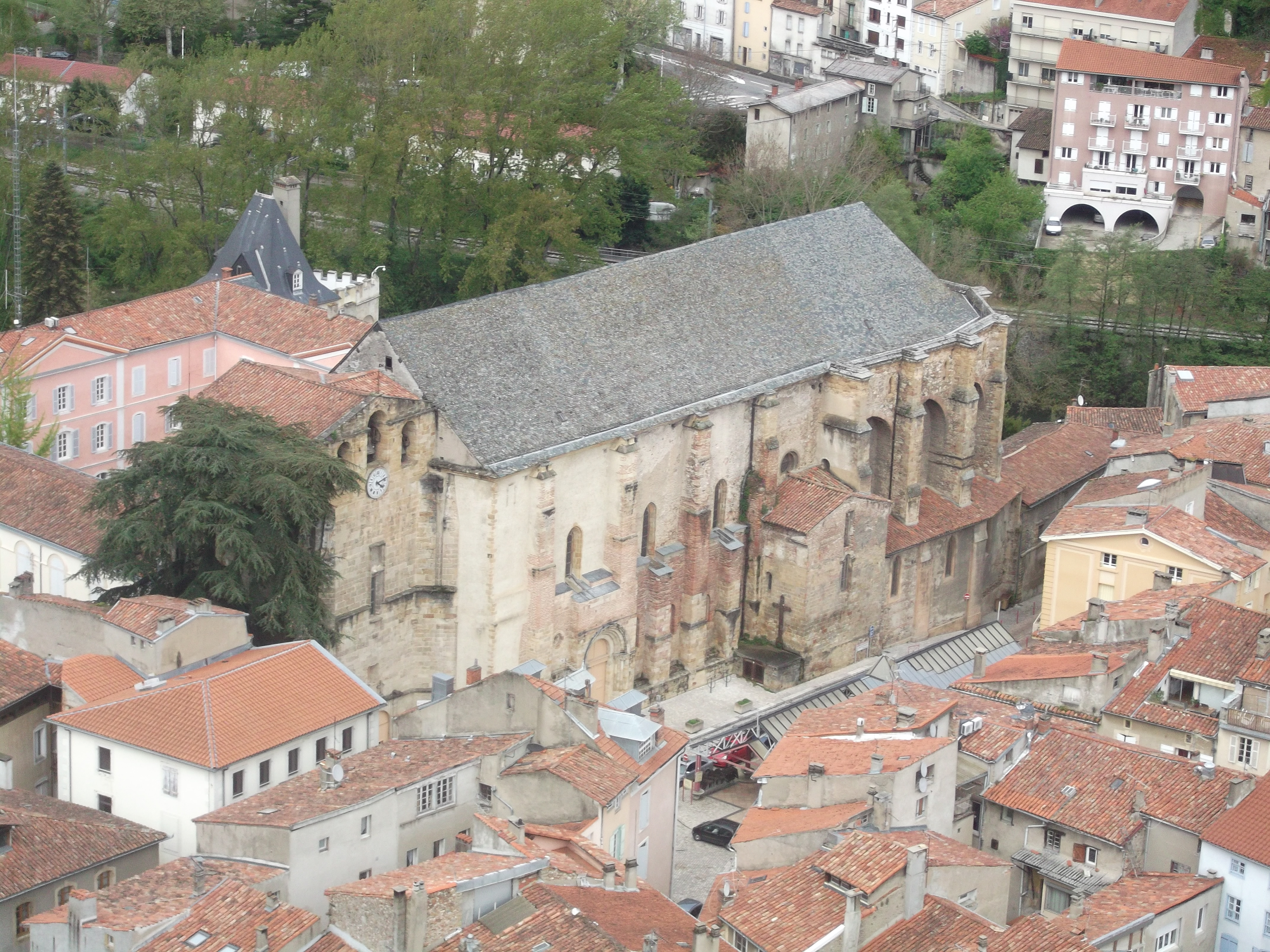
- The abbatial church seen from the castle.

- Location within Occitanie
- 42.96690°N 1.60669°E
- Type: Roman Catholic abbatial church
- Location: Foix, Ariège

History
- Built: Middle Ages; 17th-century

Site notes
- Architectural style: Romanesque
- Governing body: Augustinians

Monument historique
- Official name: Église Saint-Volusien
- Designated: July 30, 1964
- Reference no.: PA00093794

Monument historique
- Official name: Orgue de tribune : buffet d'orgue
- Designated: November 17, 1997
- Reference no.: PM09000984

The Church of Saint-Volusien is an abbatial church in Foix, Ariège in southwestern France. It already existed in the 12th century and was re-built and renovated several times.

== History ==
In 1104, the Canons Regular of Saint Augustine (Augustinians) took possession of the abbey that housed the relics of saint Volusianus of Tours. They decided to build a three-nave church with a transept. In the 14th century, the Romanesque apse was replaced with a polygonal choir.

During the French Wars of Religion, the abbey was destroyed and the relics were burnt. The reconstruction works started in 1609 and probably ended around 1670 when the new vault was installed. The Medieval church still has remnants of the portal and the base of the nave's walls.

The church was classified as a Historic Monument in 1964.

== Organ ==
The church already had an organ in 1502, but little is known about it.

The current 40-stops romantic organ was installed by Leroy-Legendre & Fermis père & fils in 1869 and restored by Lucien Simon and Jean-Pascal Villard in 2004. It was classified as a Historic Monument object on November 17, 1997.

== Gallery ==
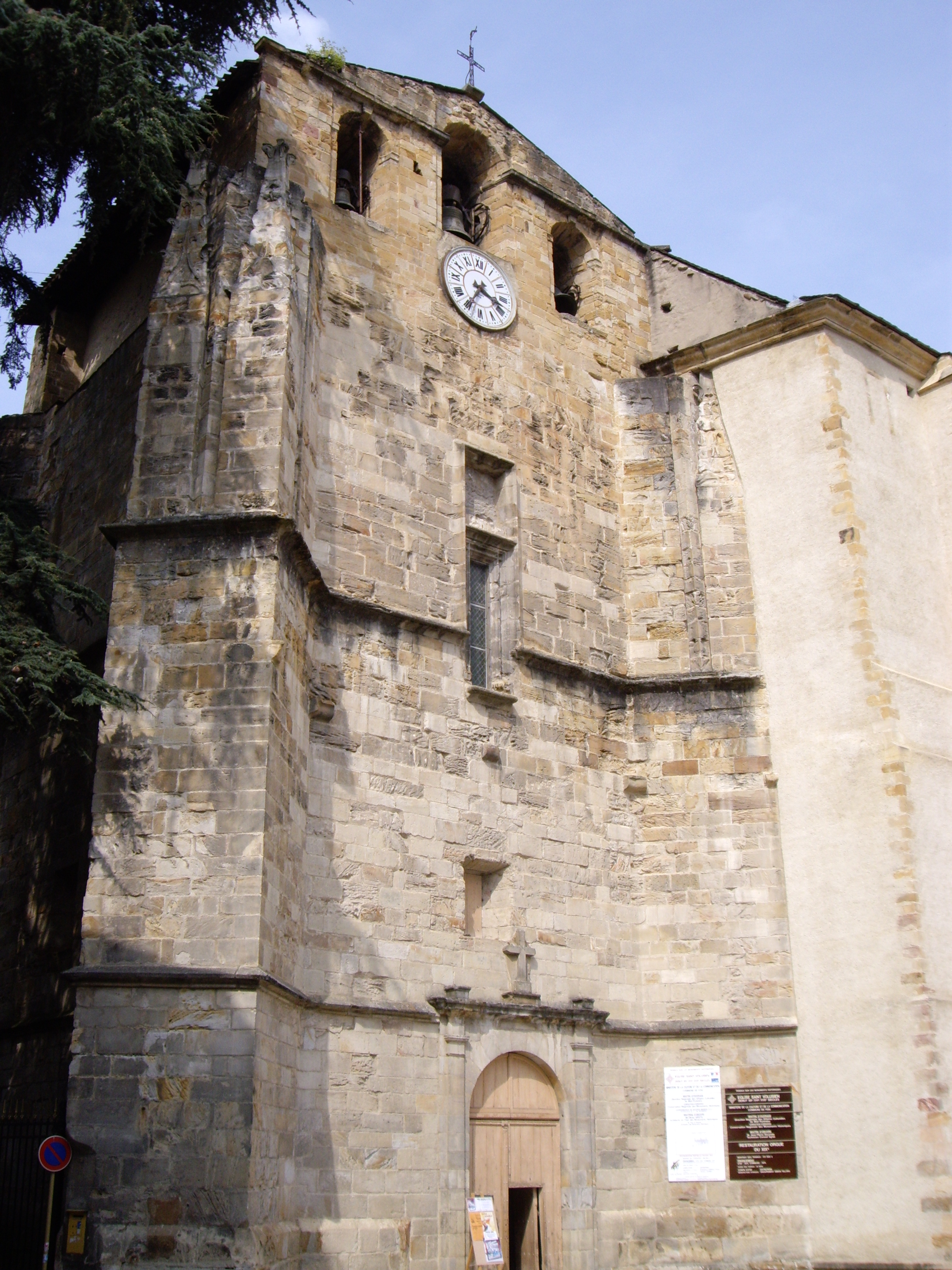
Exterior

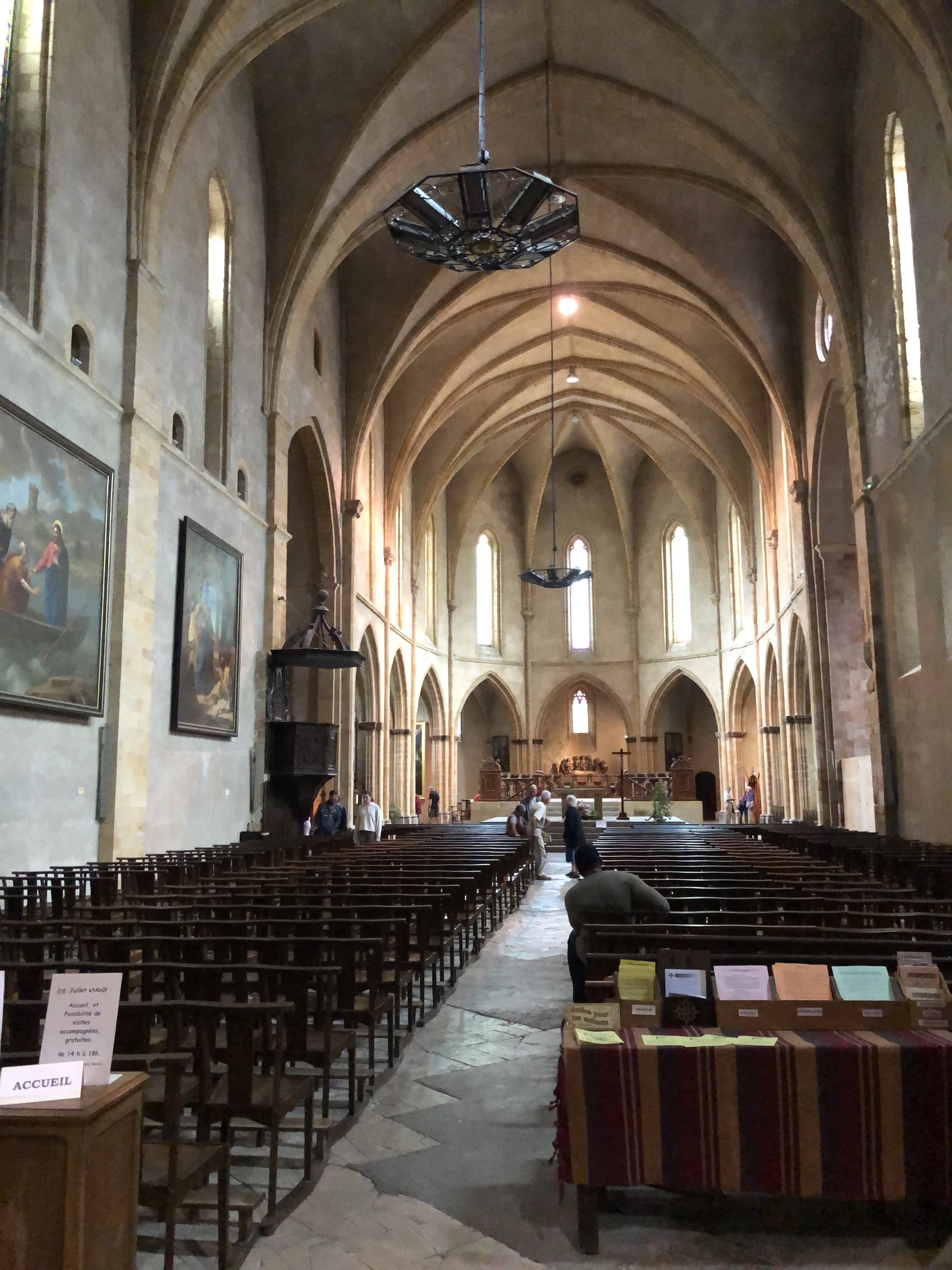
The nave

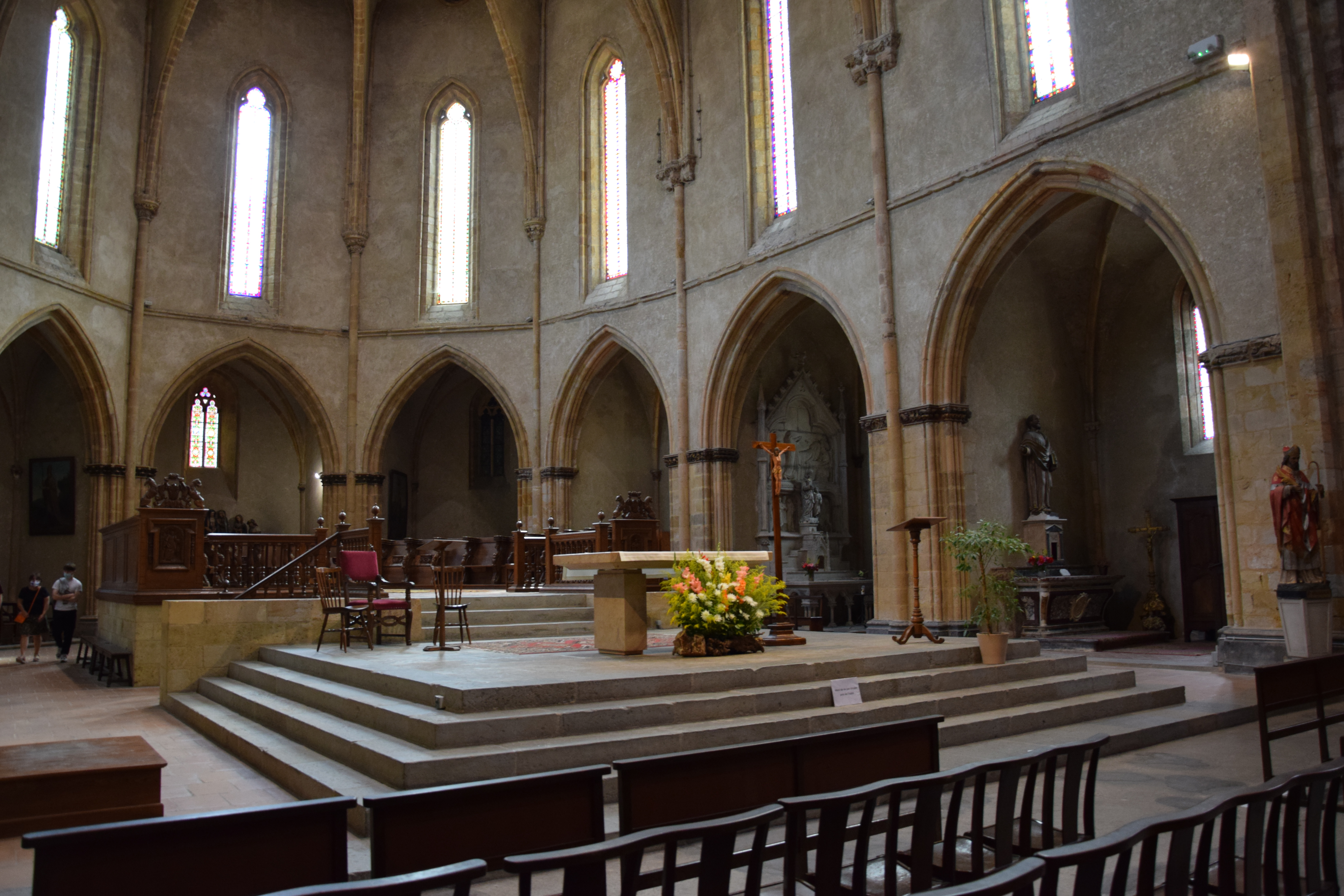
The sanctuary

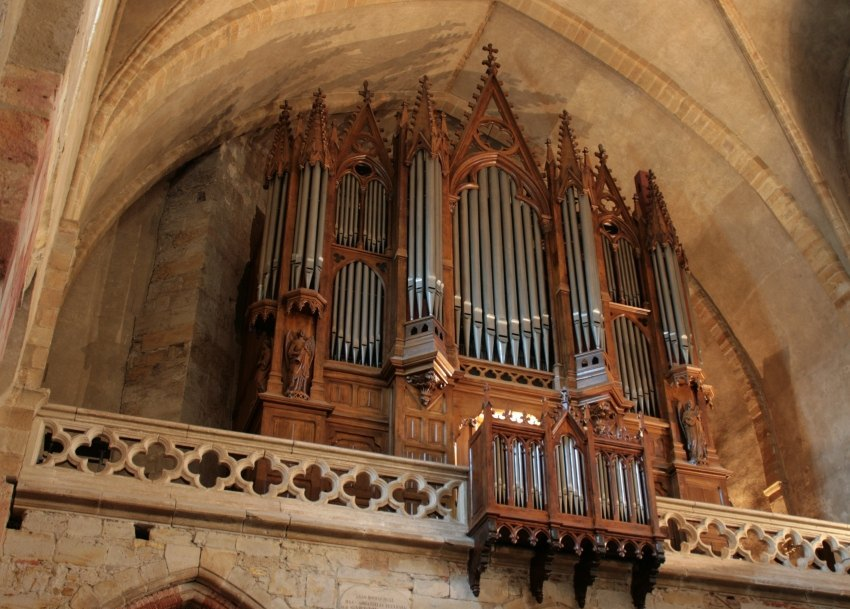
The organ

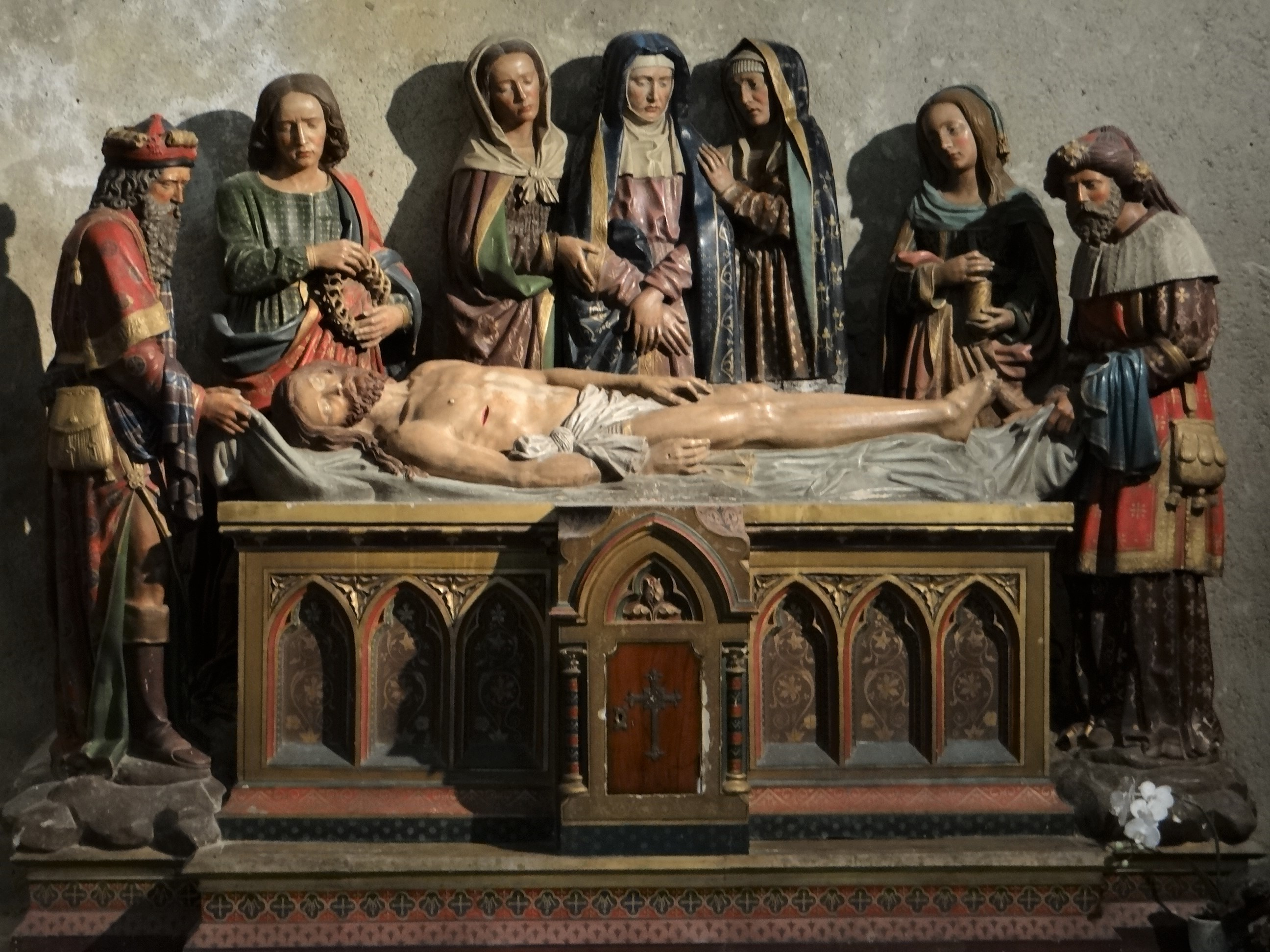
Entombment
