= Fleury Marius =

French aviator (1896–1972)

Fleury Marius (May 17, 1896 – May 15, 1972) was a French aviator. He was born and raised in Lyon, and he was part of the 99th Infantry Regiment in World War I and was appointed commander of the Lyon Air Division in 1945, during World War II.
