= Aeronautical Medal =

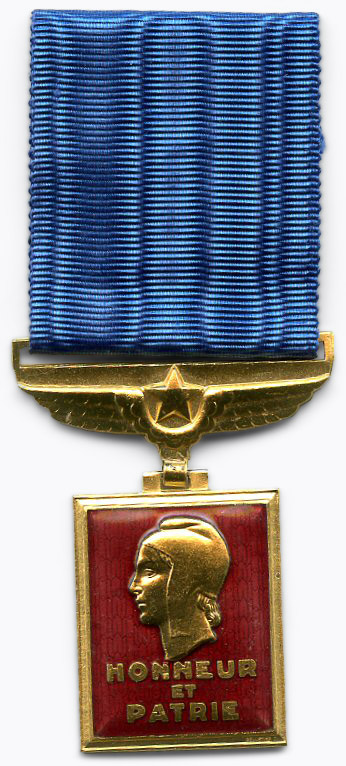
- Aeronautical Medal (Obverse)
- Type: Order of Merit
- Awarded for: Accomplishments in aeronautics
- Presented by: France
- Established: 14 February 1945; 81 years ago
- Ribbon of the Aeronautical Medal

Precedence
- Next (higher): Cross of the resistance volunteer combatant
- Next (lower): Combatant's Cross

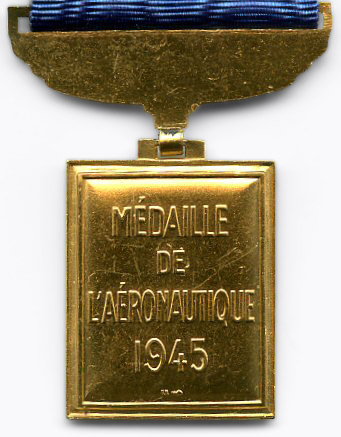
Reverse of the Médaille de l'Aéronautique

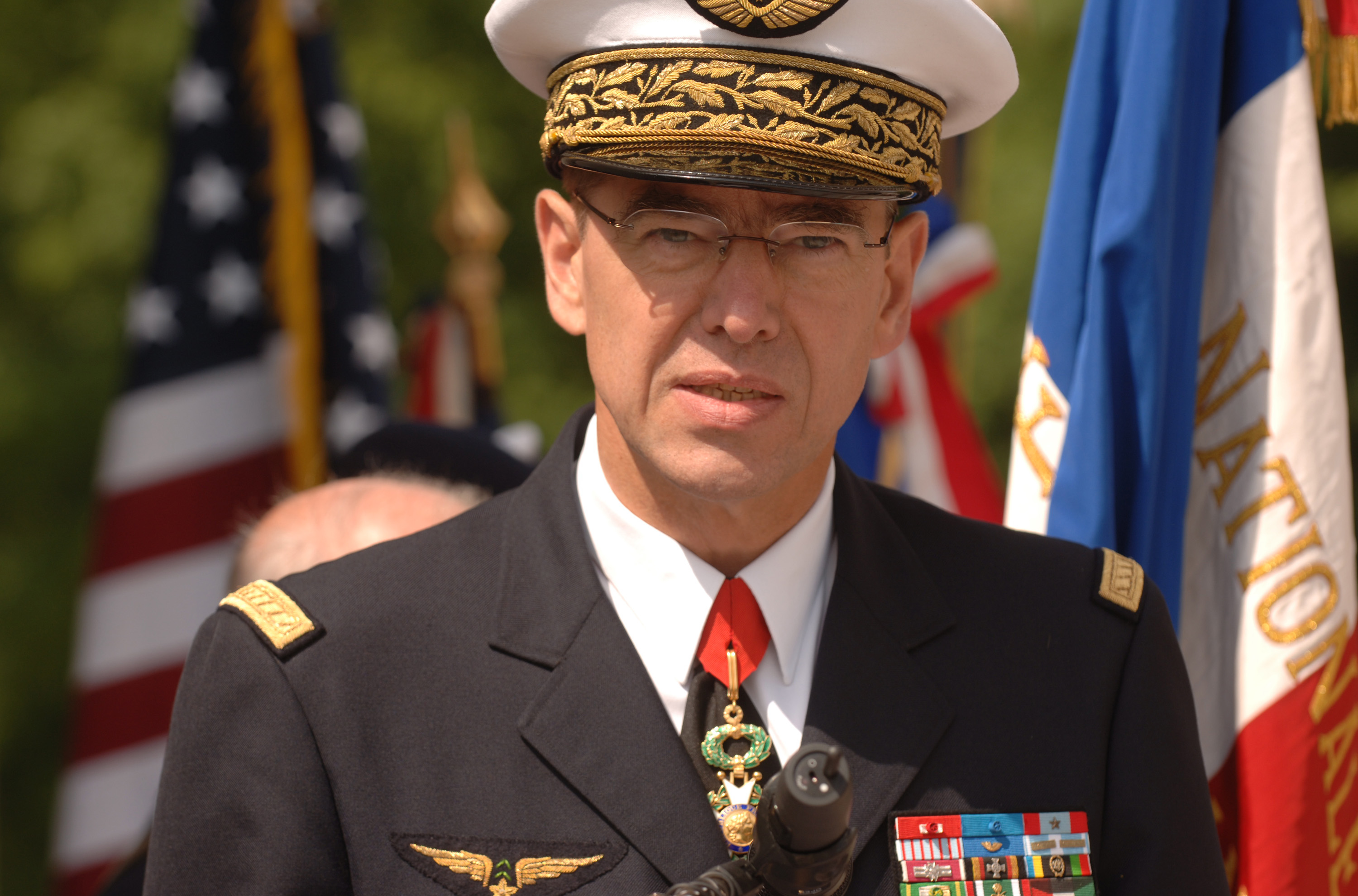
French air force general Stéphane Abrial, a recipient of the Aeronautical Medal

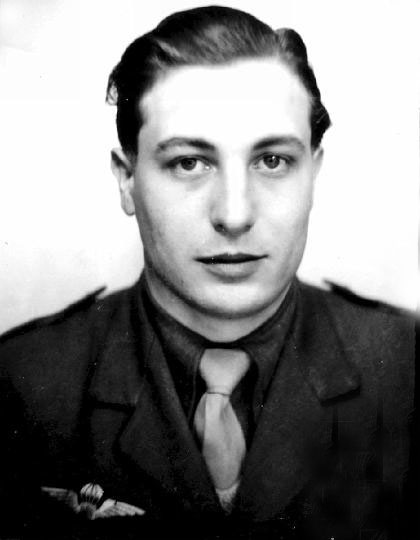
Free French Officer and OSS Agent René Joyeuse, a recipient of the Aeronautical Medal

The Aeronautical Medal (French: "Médaille de l'Aéronautique") is a state decoration of France established by the decree of February 14, 1945. It is awarded to both military personnel and civilians for outstanding accomplishments related to the field of aeronautics. Originally envisioned before the Second World War, it was intended as an equal to the Order of Maritime Merit. The intent was to create an aerial order of merit intended for civilian and military personnel working in aeronautics. The war temporarily put an end to the project until February 1945.

== Statute ==
Recipients are chosen by a council presided by a member of the office of the secretary of state for the armed forces (air) that will be composed of:

- the chief of staff of the air force,
- the director of the aeronautical administration control department,
- the technical and industry director to the secretary of state for the armed forces (air),
- a member named by decree of the minister for public works, transport and tourism, representing the ministry,
- a representative of the aerial navigation companies named for two years by decree of the minister for public works, transport and tourism,
- a personality with a history of exceptional services in aeronautics named for two years by decree of the secretary of state for the armed forces (air).

In case of the absence of any member of the council, an interim member is named by decree of the related authority. This same council has the authority to propose the revocation of the decoration for serious breaches of honour. The details of the workings of such a proposal would be made by ministerial decree.

The Aeronautical Medal is limited to no more than 275 new recipients per year, it is awarded twice annually on 1 January and 14 July. It is awarded for professional valour to both civilians and military pilots and non pilots serving under the Ministry of Defence (Air) or the Department of Transportation. It is awarded to citizens who have distinguished themselves in the development of military or civil aviation, sports aviation, airports and aircraft manufacturing plants. It can be awarded for prowess in the air, an act of heroism in the air, or for particularly unusual work or research in aviation. Finally, the medal can be awarded for exceptional service during serious air related accidents.

The medal can be awarded posthumously and to foreign nationals.

== Award description ==
The medal is rectangular and made of gilt metal. The obverse bears the gilt left profile of Marianne from the 1940s, representing France. Below Marianne is the gilt inscription "Honneur et Patrie" (Honour and Country). The medal is enameled in red except for Marianne, the inscription and a 2 mm exterior border. The medal is suspended to a 37 mm wide royal blue silk moiré ribbon by a wing-shaped pendant with a relief of a five pointed star at its center and a horizontal slot to receive the ribbon. The reverse bears the inscription on four lines "MÉDAILLE DE L'AÉRONAUTIQUE 1945" (AERONAUTICAL MEDAL 1945).

== Notable recipients (partial list) ==
=== French citizens ===
- Fighter pilot Élisabeth Boselli
- Pioneer female pilot Marie Marvingt
- World War 2 fighter ace Pierre Clostermann
- General Marie-Pierre Kœnig
- Engineer François Hussenot
- General Bernard Saint-Hillier
- First French female fighter pilot Caroline Aigle (Posthumous)
- Airbus senior vice president for engineering Bernard Ziegler
- General Jacques Marie Alfred Gaston Faure
- General Stéphane Abrial
- General Pierre Armand Gaston Billotte
- General Georges Roger Pierre Bergé
- General Francis Pollet
- World War 2 fighter ace Jacques Andrieux
- World War 2 fighter ace Pierre Pouyade
- Astronaut, brigadier general Jean-Loup Jacques Marie Chrétien
- General Jean-Paul Paloméros
- First French female general officer Valérie André
- Director-general of the civil aviation university Louis Pailhas
- Engineer Émile Allegret
- Engineer Yves Lambert
- General Raoul Salan
- Engineer and CEO of the Dassault Group Serge Dassault
- Pioneering female aviator Maryse Bastié
- Astronaut Patrick Pierre Roger Baudry
- General Georges Catroux
- Admiral Philippe Henri Xavier Antoine de Gaulle
- Engineer Émile Allegret
- Rene Joyeuse Free French Officer and OSS Agent

=== Foreign nationals ===
- James Stephen "Steve" Fossett (USA)
- Pioneer female pilot Hélène Dutrieu (Belgium)
- Canadian Helicopter CEO Craig Lawrence Dobbin (Canada)
- USAF Major general Albert Boyd (USA)
- Sergeant Margaret Alfreda Wynne (UK) WAAF translator for the Free French

== See also ==
- Ribbons of the French military and civil awards
