= Stéphane Abrial =

French general

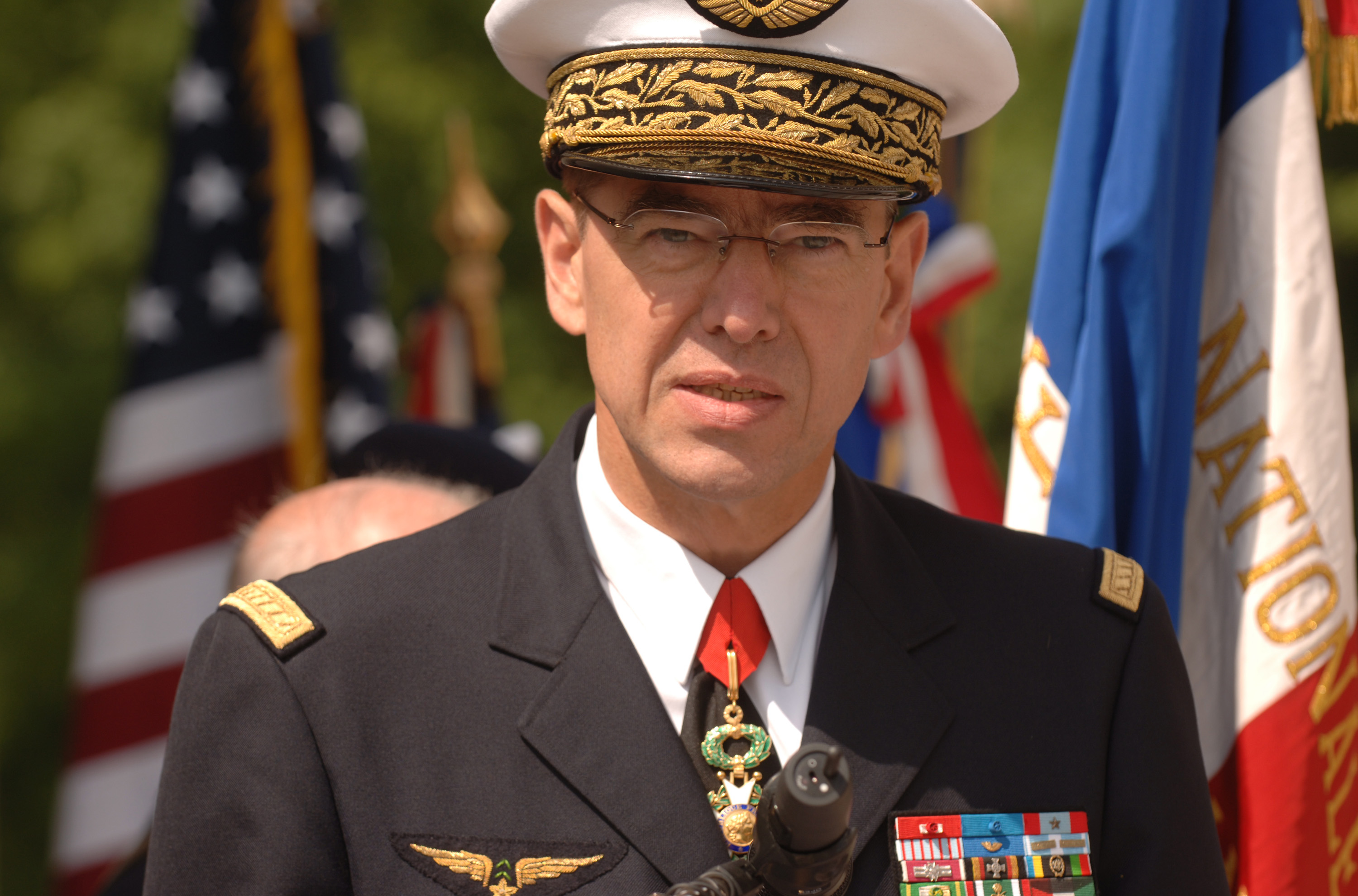
- Général d'Armée Aérienne Stéphane Abrial, Commander Allied Command Transformation-NATO
- Born: 7 September 1954 (age 72); Condom, Gers, France
- Military career
- Allegiance: France
- Branch: French Air Force
- Service years: 1976 – 2012
- Rank: Général d'armée aérienne
- Commands: Chief of Staff of the French Air Force (2006–2009); Allied Command Transformation (2009–2012)
- Conflicts: Gulf War
- Awards: Grand Officer of the Legion of Honour; Officer of the Order of National Merit; Médaille de l'Aéronautique; Commander of the Legion of Merit (United States); Grand Officer of the Order of Abdulaziz al Saud (Saudi Arabia); Grand Officer of the Order of Aeronautical Merit (Brazil)

Stéphane Abrial (French pronunciation: [abʁiɑl]; born 7 September 1954), is a French general who is the previous commander of Allied Command Transformation based in Norfolk, Virginia, one of the two NATO strategic commands. His previous posting was as the Chief of Staff of the French Air Force.

== French military career ==
General Stéphane Abrial, who was on exchange to the USAFA (US Air Force Academy) during the fall semester in 1974, graduated the next summer in 1975 from l’École de l'air (‘French Air Force Academy’) at Salon. He completed pilot training, also at Salon, in 1976.

From 1977 to 1991, he served as a fighter pilot both in France (in Cambrai, Dijon and Orange) and, from 1981 to 1984, in a West German Luftwaffe unit. In 1988, he assisted the Greek Air Force in converting its first unit equipped with the Mirage 2000.

In 1991, he took part in the first Gulf War as a fighter pilot and commander of the French Air Force's 5th Fighter Squadron. Later that year, he attended the Air War College, at Maxwell Air Force Base in Montgomery, Alabama.

From 1992 to 1996, he served in the staff of the French Air Force Chief of Staff and the Chief of Defense Staff. From 1996 to 1999, he served at NATO Headquarters, in Brussels. In 2000, he became deputy head of the French President's military staff, and in 2002 was appointed head of the French Prime Minister's military staff.

In 2005, General Abrial became head of the French Air Defense headquarters, in Taverny, and in 2006 Air Force Chief of Staff.

== NATO Supreme Allied Commander ==
Gen. Stéphane Abrial received appointment by the North Atlantic Council as Supreme Allied Commander Transformation on 29 July 2009, the first European to be appointed permanently as head of a NATO strategic command.

In April 2010, he received a Distinguished Leadership Award from the Atlantic Council.

== Major military awards ==

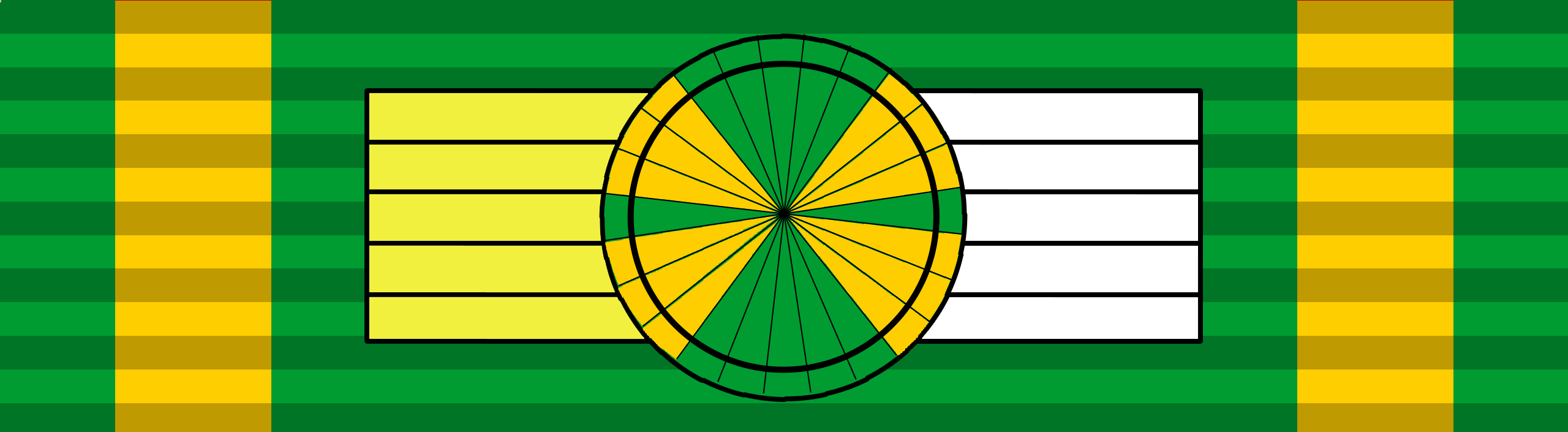

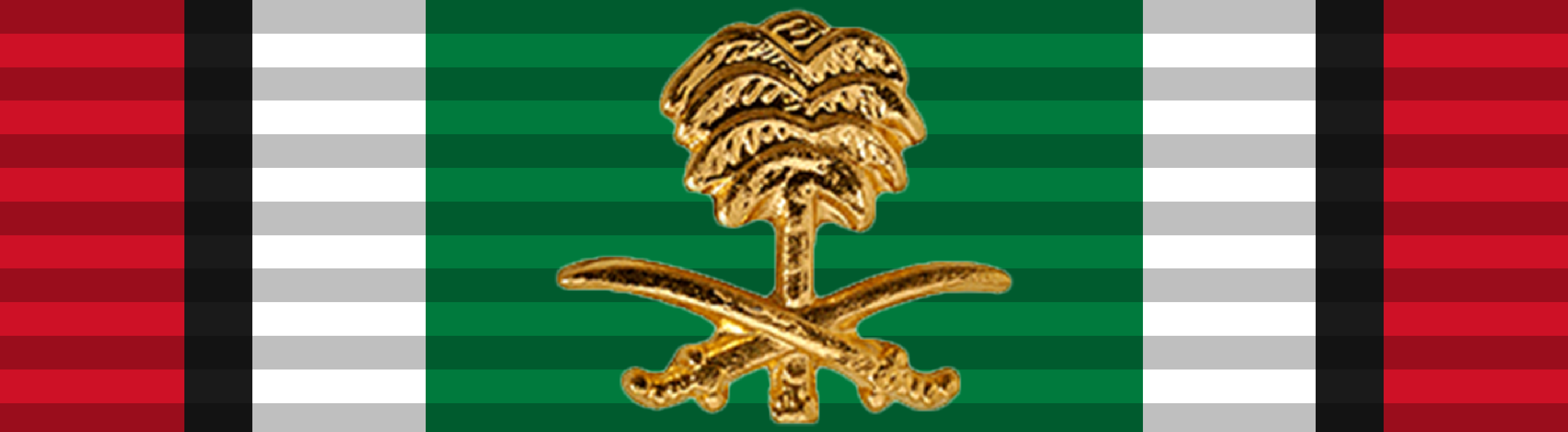

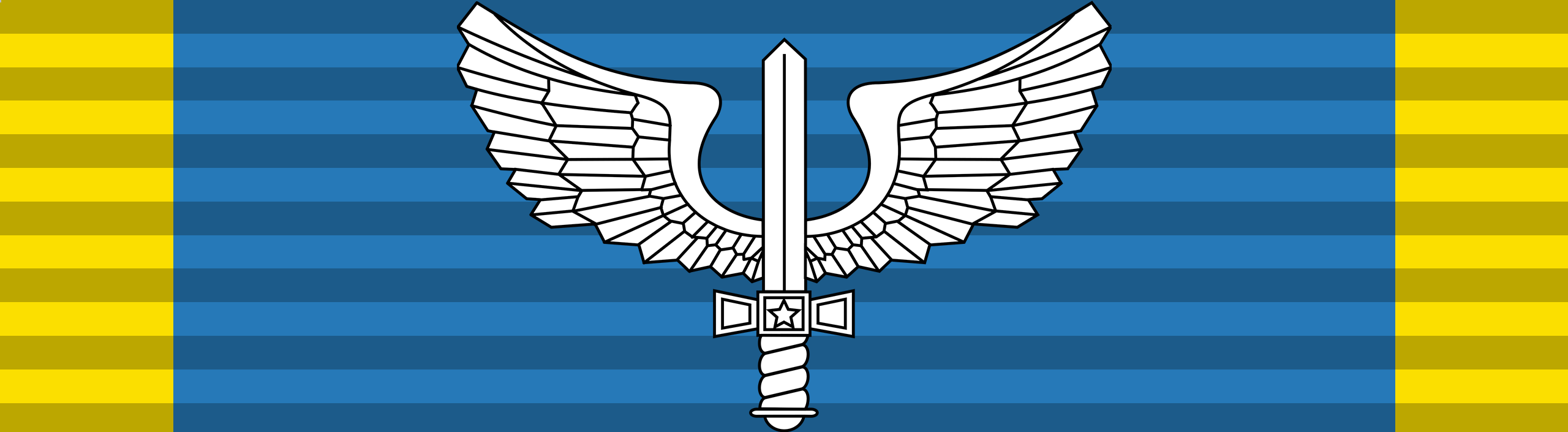

- Grand Officer of the Légion d'honneur (France)
- Officer of the Ordre national du Mérite (France)
- Croix de guerre des TOE with one silver-gilt star (France)
- Croix du Combattant (France)
- Médaille de l'Aéronautique (France)
- Overseas Medal with two bars (France)
- Legion of Merit, Commander (USA)
- Bundeswehr Cross of Honour in Silver (Germany)
- German Sports Badge (Military version in Bronze)
- Order of Abdulaziz al Saud, First Class (Saudi Arabia)
- Kuwait Liberation Medal (Saudi Arabia)
- Kuwait Liberation Medal (Kuwait)
- Grand Officer of the Order of Aeronautical Merit (Brazil)
- Santos-Dumont Medal of Merit, Brazilian Air Force
- Cross of Naval Merit, White Grand Cross (Spain)
- NATO Meritorious Service Medal
- Commemorative Medal of the Chief of General Staff of the Slovak Armed Forces in gold
- Order of the Crown, Grand Cross (Belgium)
- Order of Merit of the Republic of Poland, Commander's Cross
- Order of Merit of the Federal Republic of Germany, Commander's Cross (7 September 2015)

== Civilian career ==
Since July 2015, Abrial has been senior executive vice president of international and public affairs of Safran.

Since February 2014, Abrial has also been chairman of the board of directors of the Musée de l’air et de l’espace Paris, since April 2013, director of the Atlantic Council, and, since December 2013, member of the advisory board of the Aspen Institute France.

== Notes ==
Military offices
Preceded by Richard Wolsztynski	Chief of Staff of the French Air Force; 16 July 2006 – 24 August 2009	Succeeded by Jean-Paul Paloméros
Preceded by James Mattis	Supreme Allied Commander Transformation; 9 September 2009 – 6 August 2012	Succeeded by Jean-Paul Paloméros
