= Bouilh-Devant =

- Commune
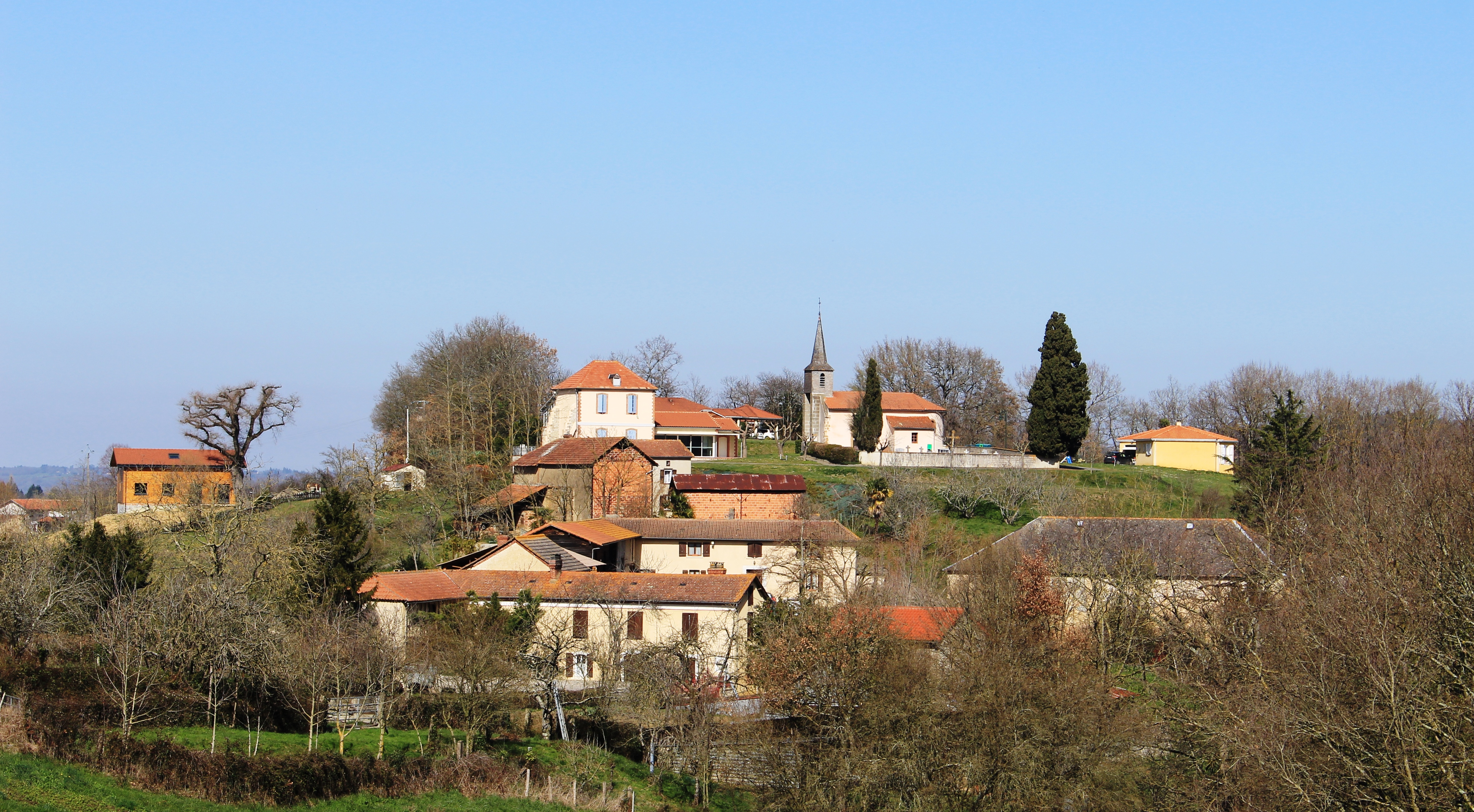
- View of Bouilh-Devant

- Coat of arms
- Location of Bouilh-Devant
- Location within France Location within Occitanie
- Coordinates: 43°19′53″N 0°15′38″E
- Country: France
- Region: Occitania
- Department: Hautes-Pyrénées
- Arrondissement: Tarbes
- Canton: Val d'Adour-Rustan-Madiranais
- Intercommunality: Adour Madiran

Government
  - Mayor (2020–2026): Marie-Josée Rottoli
- Area^{1}: 2.99 km^{2} (1.15 sq mi)
- Elevation: 341 m (1,119 ft)
- Highest elevation: 381 m (1,250 ft)
- Lowest elevation: 245 m (804 ft)
- Population (2023): 23
  - Density: 7.7/km^{2} (20/sq mi)
- Time zone: UTC+01:00 (CET)
  - Summer (DST): UTC+02:00 (CEST)
- INSEE/Postal code: 65102 /65140
- ^{1} French Land Register data, which excludes lakes, ponds, glaciers > 1 km^{2} (0.386 sq mi or 247 acres) and river estuaries.

Bouilh-Devant (Occitan: Davant) is a commune in the Hautes-Pyrénées department in southwestern France.

== Population ==
Historical population
Year	Pop.	±% p.a.
1968	39	—
1975	31	−3.23%
1982	35	+1.75%
1990	27	−3.19%
1999	23	−1.77%
2007	17	−3.71%
2012	22	+5.29%
2017	21	−0.93%
2023	23	+1.53%
Source: INSEE

== See also ==
- Communes of the Hautes-Pyrénées department
