= Académie de l'air et de l'espace =

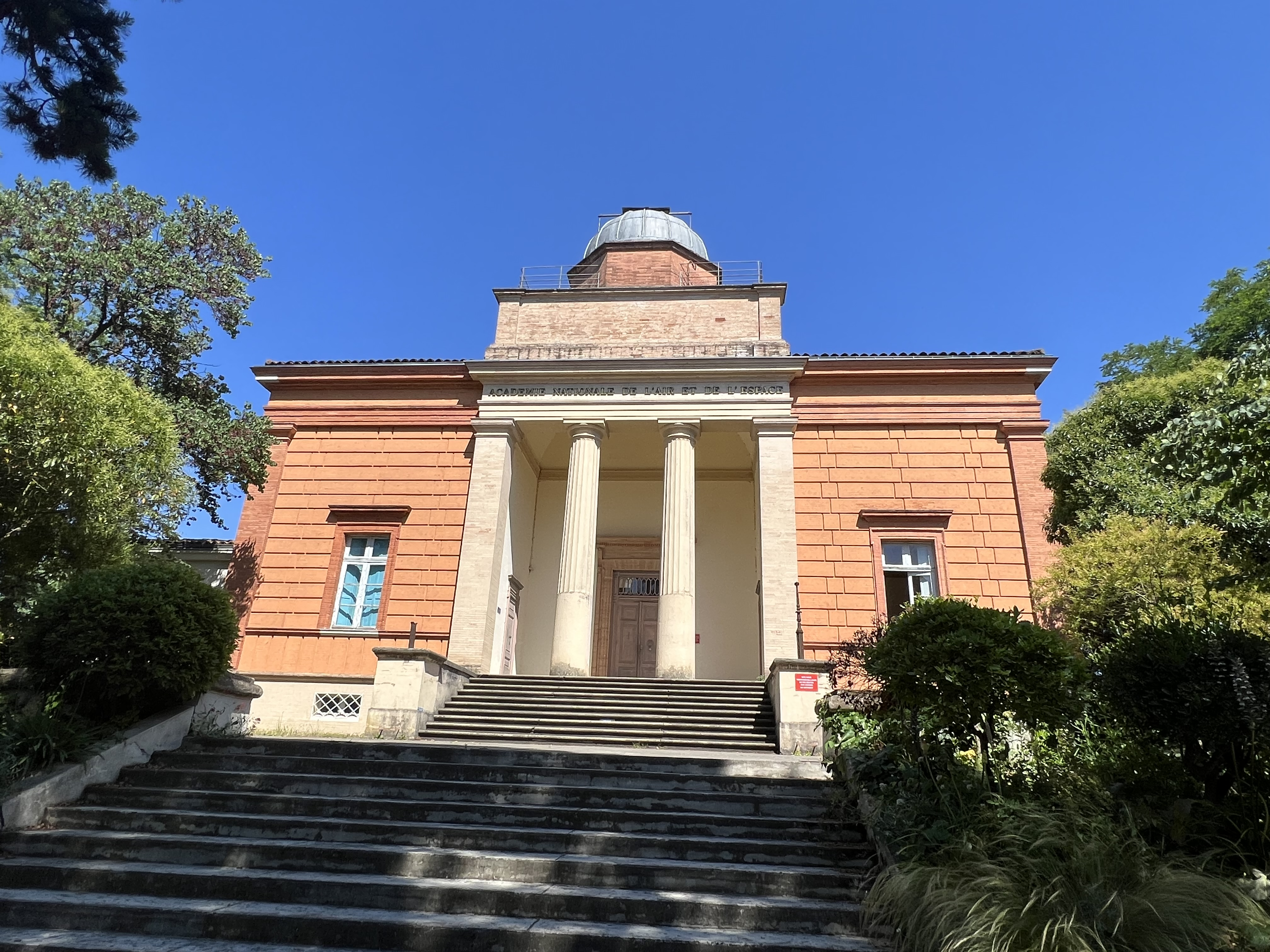
Académie de l’air et de l’espace

The Académie de l'air et de l'espace (AAE) is the French national Air and Space Academy. Established in 1983 in Toulouse on the initiative of André Turcat, the aims of the academy are the following: "To encourage the development of high quality scientific, technical, cultural and Human Actions in the realms of Air and Space, promote knowledge in these areas and constitute a focal point for activities". Its members, who come from all walks of aerospace life : pilots, astronauts, scientists, engineers, doctors, manufacturers, economists, lawyers, artists ... all work together to achieve these essential goals.

Its president is Gerard Brachet.

== History ==
=== The vow of Colonel Edmond Petit ===
The idea of an air academy dates to 1954. Colonel Edmond Petit, then head of information of the Air Force service and literary editor of the French Air Force magazine, published numerous articles campaigning in favor of such an institution since the year 1954. He saw it mainly as an academy for French language texts on aeronautics, where the French Academy was "completely incompetent" and as the place to be able to develop History of aviation.

=== The establishment of the academy because of the reputation of André Turcat ===
This project could not be completed until 1983, in a broader form. It is the former chief test pilot of the Concorde, André Turcat, who got the National Academy of Air and Space out of limbo as much through his reputation within French aeronautics as well as with the municipal authorities of Toulouse. The material support of La Ville Rose allowed the installation of the academy on the site of the former Jolimont observatory and, for the hundredth anniversary of the first human flight, the thirty five founding members gathered on 21 November 1983, in a plenary assembly.

Incorporated under the association law of 1901, declared a public utility in 1987, the academy has declared its objectives to "encourage the development of high quality scientific, technical, cultural and human actions in the realms of Air and Space, promote knowledge in these areas and constitute a focal point for activities."

=== International influence ===
The academy organizes international conferences and forums, presents exhibitions, gives out awards or medals to people who have made distinguished contributions. It regularly publishes, every two or three months, "The Letter of the Academy" presenting several pages on a relevant aeronautical subject. Works on a larger scale result in publications by the academy itself (as papers) or by private publishers (as books).

By statute, the Air and Space Academy has sixty French members, thirty foreign associates, honorary members (chosen from amongst the pioneers of aeronautics and space), and correspondents who ensure an ongoing connection to the current activities of the aerospace world. Its members become honorary at the age of 75 or upon their request, while continuing, at their convenience, to take part in the work of the academy.

Members may join different sections according to their speciality. These five areas are:

1. scientific knowledge of air and space
2. applied sciences and technology of air and space
3. human presence and activities of air and space
4. ethics, law, sociology, and economics of air and space
5. history, literature, and arts of air and space

At the request of one of the tenured or honorary members, committees may be established to deal with current issues.

In 2007 the academy adopted the name "Air and Space Academy".
