= Ax-les-Thermes station =

Railway station in Ax-les-Thermes, Occitanie, France

Ax-les-Thermes
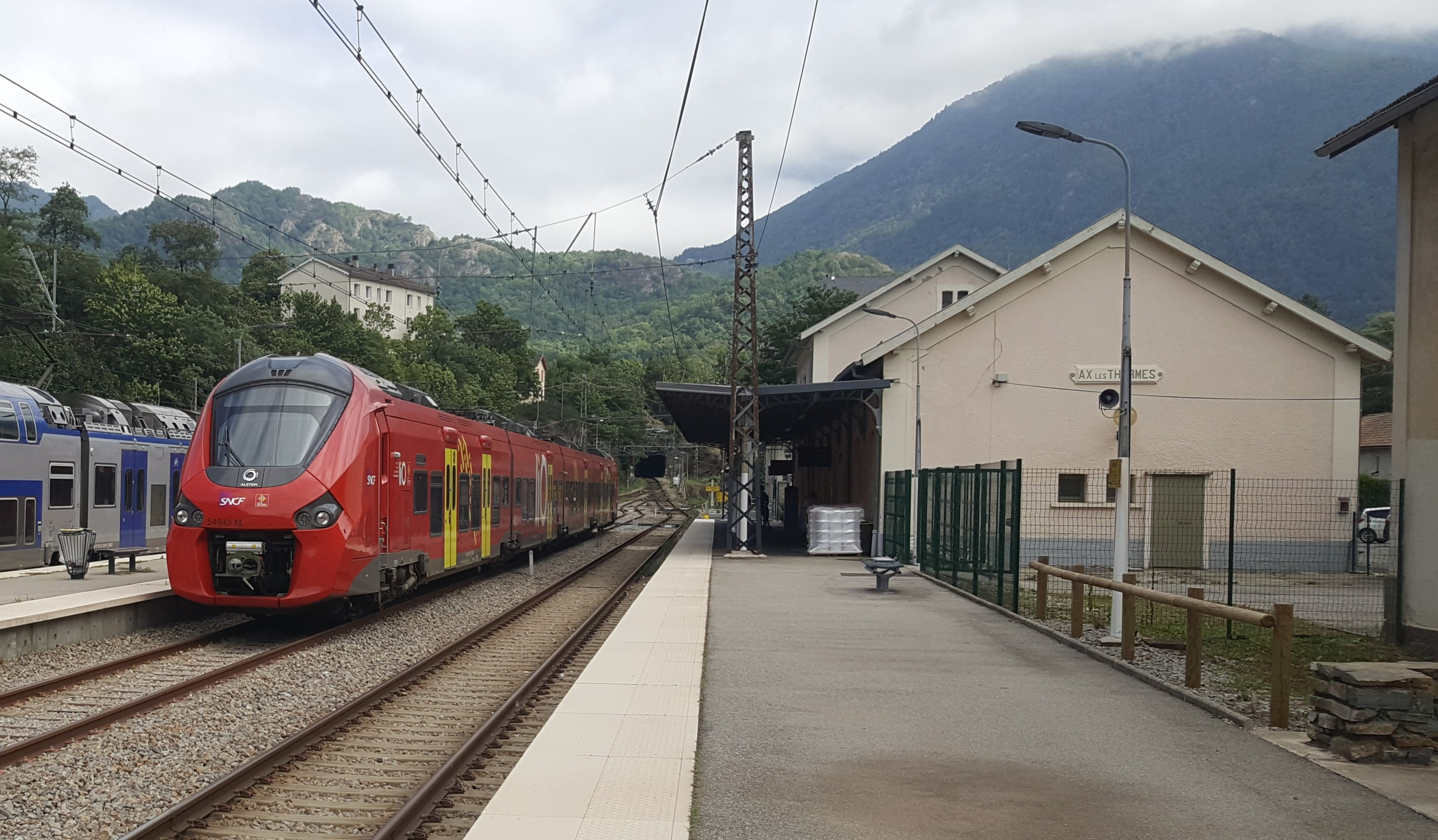
- Ax-les-Thermes railway station.

General information
- Location: Ax-les-Thermes, Ariège, Occitanie; France
- Coordinates: 42°43′28″N 1°50′01″E
- Owner: SNCF
- Operator: SNCF
- Line: Portet-Saint-Simon–Puigcerdà railway
- Platforms: 3
- Tracks: 7

Other information
- Station code: 87611533

History
- Opened: 22 April 1888

Services
Preceding station	SNCF	Following station
Luzenac-Garanou towards Paris-Austerlitz	Intercités (night)	Mérens-les-Vals towards Latour-de-Carol
Preceding station	TER Occitanie	Following station
Luzenac-Garanou towards Toulouse	11	Mérens-les-Vals towards Latour-de-Carol
Location
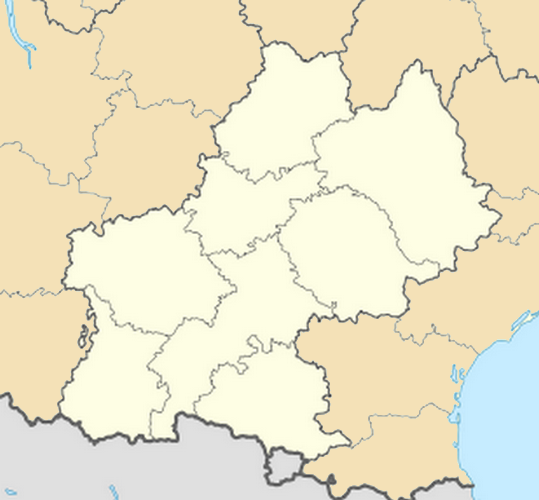
- Location within Midi-Pyrénées Location within France

Ax-les-Thermes station (French: Gare d'Ax-les-Thermes) is a railway station in Ax-les-Thermes, Occitanie, France. The station is on the Portet-Saint-Simon–Puigcerdà railway. The station is served by TER (local) and Intercités de Nuit (night trains) services operated by the SNCF.

== Train services ==
The following services currently call at Ax-les-Thermes:

- night service (Intercités de nuit) Paris–Pamiers–Latour-de-Carol
- local service (TER Occitanie) Toulouse–Foix–Latour-de-Carol-Enveitg

== Bus services ==
Bus services depart from Ax-les-Thermes towards Luzenac, Les Cabannes (Town Centre), Ussat-les-Bains, Tarascon-sur-Ariège, Mercus-Garrabet, Saint-Paul-de-Jarrat, Montgaillard, Foix, Saint-Jean-de-Verges, Varilhes and Pamiers.

== Gallery ==
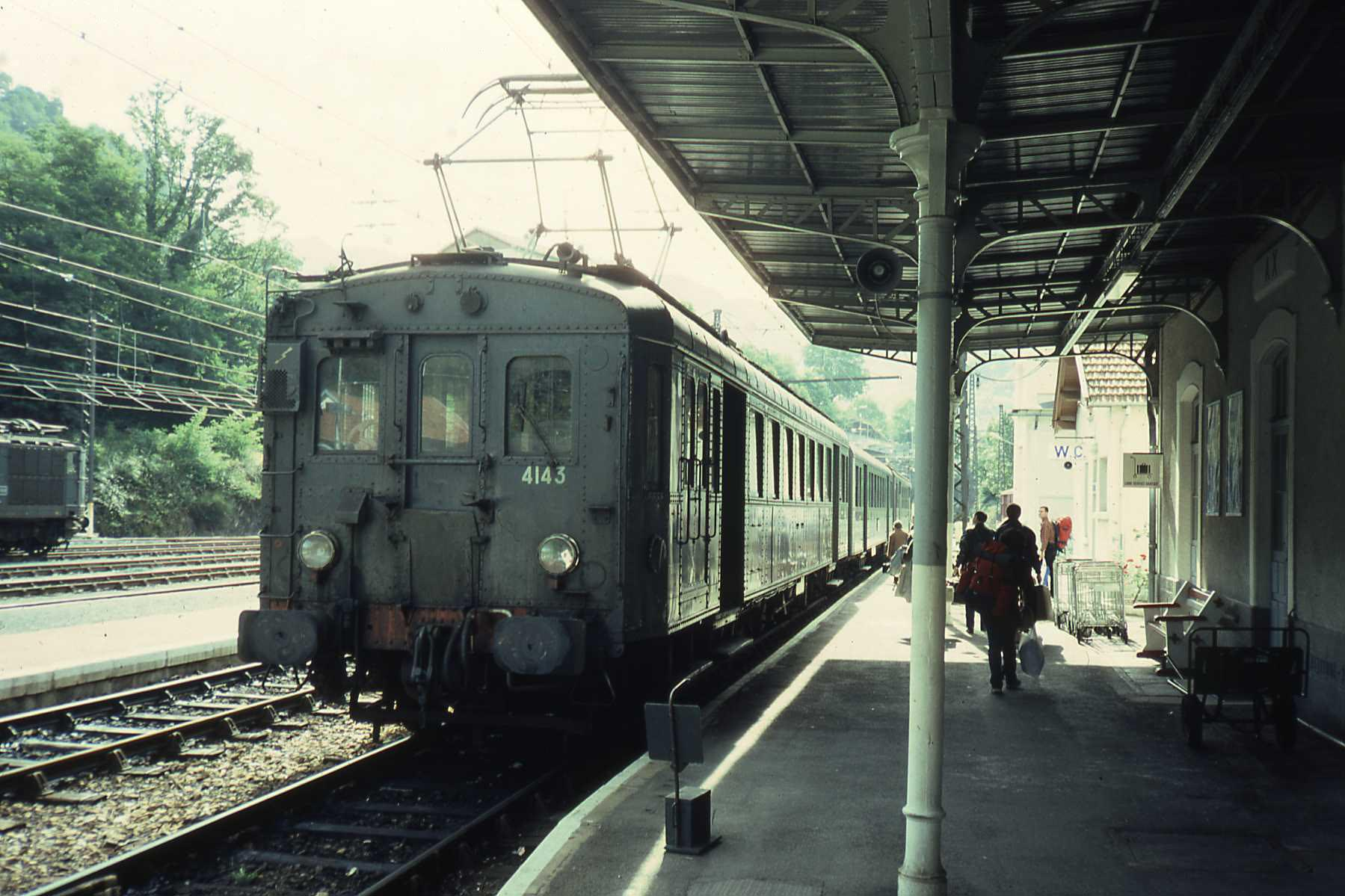
Class Z4100 (Z4143) at Ax les Thermes in 1981
