= Luzenac–Garanou station =

Railway station in Luzenac, France

Luzenac–Garanou

General information
- Location: Luzenac, Ariège, Occitanie; France
- Coordinates: 42°45′53″N 1°45′11″E
- Line: Portet-Saint-Simon–Puigcerdà railway
- Platforms: 2

Other information
- Station code: 87611558

History
- Opened: 22 April 1888

Services
Preceding station	SNCF	Following station
Les Cabannes towards Paris-Austerlitz	Intercités (night)	Ax-les-Thermes towards Latour-de-Carol
Preceding station	TER Occitanie	Following station
Les Cabannes towards Toulouse	11	Ax-les-Thermes towards Latour-de-Carol
Location
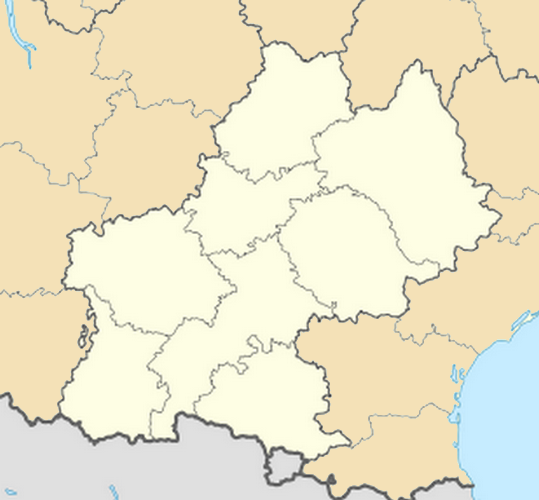
- Location within Midi-Pyrénées Location within France

Luzenac–Garanou is a railway station in Luzenac, Occitanie, France. The station is on the Portet-Saint-Simon–Puigcerdà railway. The station is served by TER (local) and Intercités de nuit (night trains) services operated by the SNCF.

The station is also the location of a small freight yard for the Rio Tinto minerals Luzenac Group facility, where talc is extracted.

== Train services ==
The following services currently call at Luzenac-Garanou:

- night service (Intercités de nuit) Paris–Pamiers–Latour-de-Carol
- local service (TER Occitanie) Toulouse–Foix–Latour-de-Carol-Enveitg

== Bus services ==
Bus services depart from Luzenac-Garanou towards Ax-les-Thermes, Les Cabannes (Town Centre), Ussat-les-Bains, Tarascon-sur-Ariège, Mercus-Garrabet, Saint-Paul-de-Jarrat, Montgaillard, Foix, Saint-Jean-de-Verges, Varilhes and Pamiers.
