= Les Cabannes station =

Railway station in Les Cabannes, France

Les Cabannes

General information
- Location: Les Cabannes, Ariège, Occitanie; France
- Coordinates: 42°47′11″N 1°41′10″E
- Line: Portet-Saint-Simon–Puigcerdà railway
- Platforms: 1
- Tracks: 1

Other information
- Station code: 87611574

History
- Opened: 22 April 1888

Services
Preceding station	SNCF	Following station
Tarascon-sur-Ariège towards Paris-Austerlitz	Intercités (night)	Luzenac-Garanou towards Latour-de-Carol
Preceding station	TER Occitanie	Following station
Tarascon-sur-Ariège towards Toulouse	11	Luzenac-Garanou towards Latour-de-Carol
Location
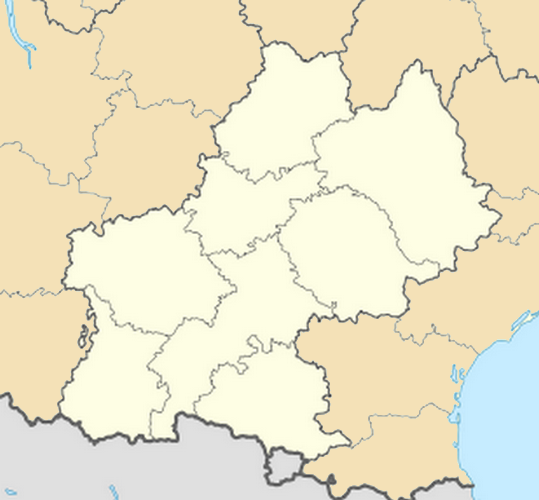
- Location within Midi-Pyrénées Location within France

Les Cabannes is a railway station in Les Cabannes, Occitanie, France. The station is on the Portet-Saint-Simon–Puigcerdà railway. The station is served by TER (local) and Intercités de nuit (night) services operated by the SNCF.

== Train services ==
The following services currently call at Les Cabannes:

- night service Paris-Pamiers-Foix–Latour-de-Carol-Enveitg
- local service (TER Occitanie) Toulouse–Foix–Latour-de-Carol-Enveitg

== Bus Services ==
Bus services depart from the town centre of Les Cabannes towards Ax-les-Thermes, Luzenac, Ussat-les-Bains, Tarascon-sur-Ariège, Mercus-Garrabet, Saint-Paul-de-Jarrat, Montgaillard, Foix, Saint-Jean-de-Verges, Varilhes and Pamiers.
