= Tarascon-sur-Ariège station =

Railway station in Tarascon-sur-Ariège, France

Tarascon-sur-Ariège

General information
- Location: Tarascon-sur-Ariège, Ariège, Occitanie; France
- Coordinates: 42°50′57″N 1°35′57″E
- Line: Portet-Saint-Simon–Puigcerdà railway
- Platforms: 2
- Tracks: 4

Other information
- Station code: 87611590

History
- Opened: 20 August 1877

Services
Preceding station	SNCF	Following station
Foix towards Paris-Austerlitz	Intercités (night)	Les Cabannes towards Latour-de-Carol
Preceding station	TER Occitanie	Following station
Foix towards Toulouse	11	Les Cabannes towards Latour-de-Carol
Location
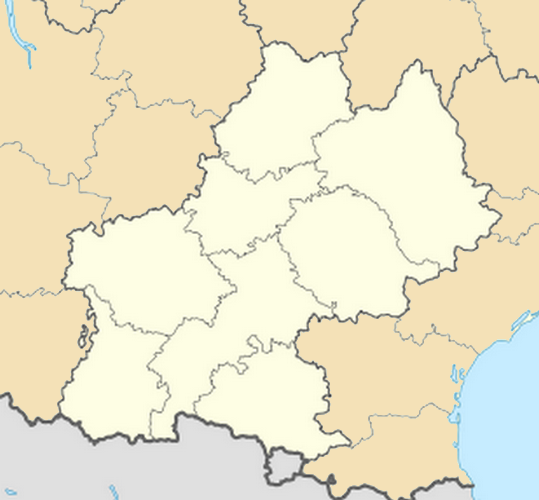
- Location within Midi-Pyrénées Location within France

Tarascon-sur-Ariège is a railway station in Tarascon-sur-Ariège, Occitanie, France. The station is on the Portet-Saint-Simon–Puigcerdà railway. The station is served by TER (local) and Intercités de nuit (night trains) services operated by the SNCF.

== Train services ==
The following services currently call at Tarascon-sur-Ariège:

- night service (Intercités de nuit) Paris–Toulouse–Pamiers–Latour-de-Carol
- local service (TER Occitanie) Toulouse–Foix–Latour-de-Carol-Enveitg

== Bus Services ==
Bus services depart from Tarascon-sur-Ariège towards Ax-les-Thermes, Luzenac, Les Cabannes (Town Centre), Ussat-les-Bains, Mercus-Garrabet, Saint-Paul-de-Jarrat, Montgaillard, Foix, Saint-Jean-de-Verges, Varilhes and Pamiers.
