= Saint-Paul-Saint-Antoine station =

Railway station in Occitanie, France

Saint-Paul-Saint-Antoine

General information
- Location: Saint-Paul-de-Jarrat, Occitanie; France
- Coordinates: 42°55′06″N 1°38′28″E
- Line: Toulouse – La Tour-de-Carol railway line
Location
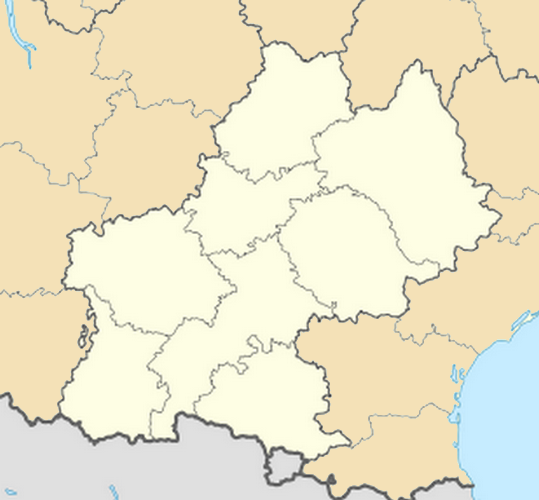
- Location within Midi-Pyrénées Location within France

Saint-Paul-Saint-Antoine is a former railway station in Saint-Paul-de-Jarrat, Occitanie, France.

== History ==
The station is on the Toulouse–La Tour-de-Carol railway line. The station is served by TER (local) bus services operated by the SNCF.

== Bus services ==
Bus services depart from Saint-Paul-Saint-Antoine towards Ax-les-Thermes, Luzenac, Les Cabannes (Town Centre), Tarascon-sur-Ariège, Ussat-les-Bains, Mercus-Garrabet, Montgaillard, Foix, Saint-Jean-de-Verges, Varilhes and Pamiers.
