= Mérens-les-Vals station =

Railway station in Mérens-les-Vals, France

Mérens-les-Vals
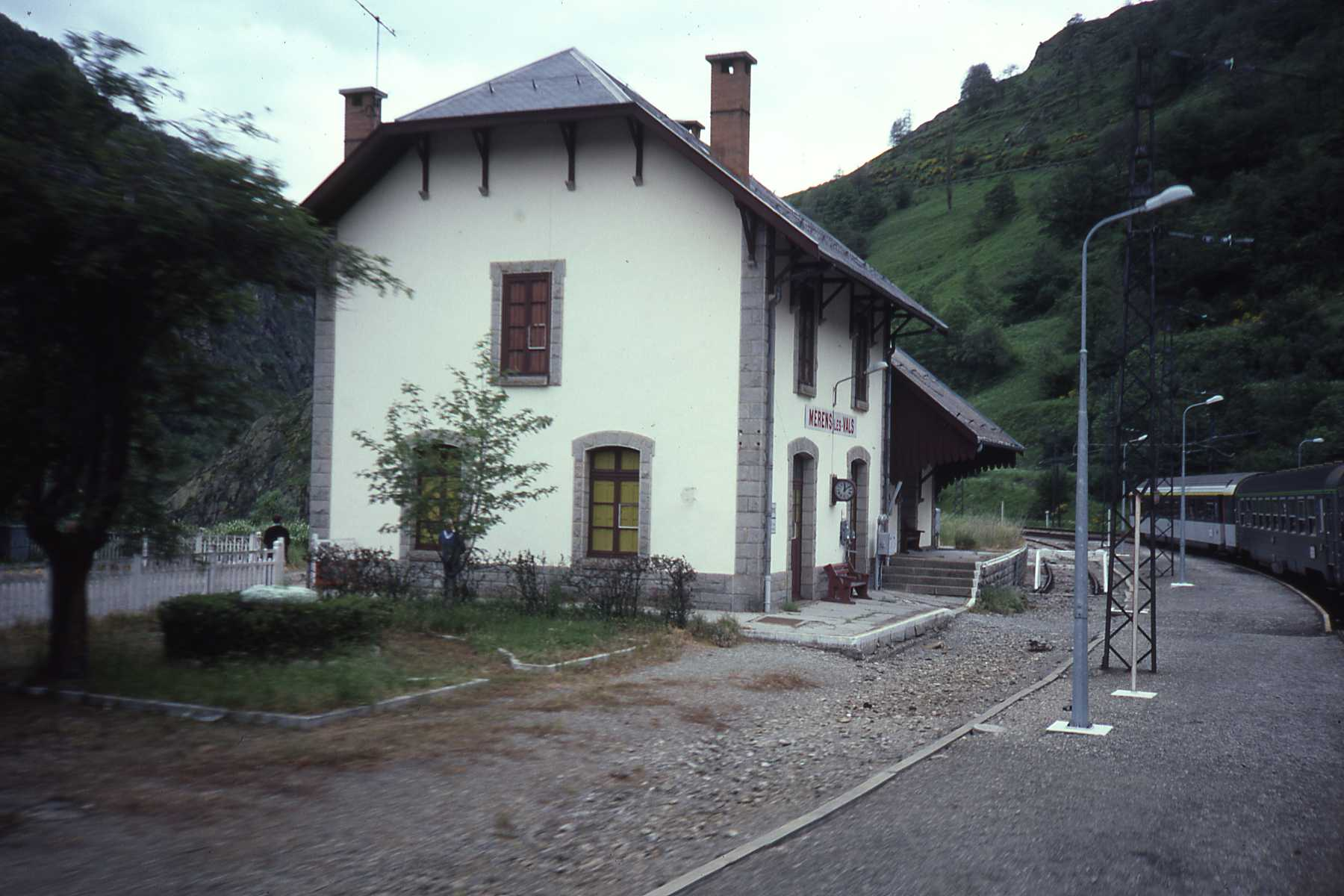
- Mérens-les-Vals railway station

General information
- Location: Mérens-les-Vals, Ariège, Midi-Pyrénées; France
- Coordinates: 42°39′32″N 1°50′12″E
- Line: Portet-Saint-Simon–Puigcerdà railway
- Platforms: 2
- Tracks: 2

Other information
- Station code: 87611525

History
- Opened: 22 July 1929

Services
Preceding station	SNCF	Following station
Ax-les-Thermes towards Paris-Austerlitz	Intercités (night)	Andorre-L'Hospitalet towards Latour-de-Carol
Preceding station	TER Occitanie	Following station
Ax-les-Thermes towards Toulouse	11	Andorre-L'Hospitalet towards Latour-de-Carol
Location
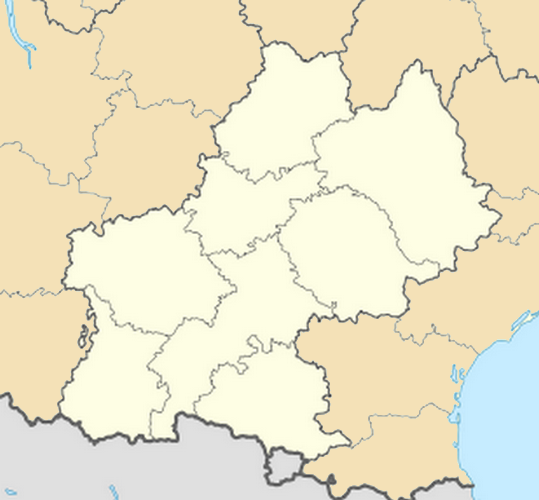
- Location within Midi-Pyrénées Location within France

Mérens-les-Vals is a railway station in Mérens-les-Vals, Midi-Pyrénées, France. The station is on the Portet-Saint-Simon–Puigcerdà railway. The station is served by TER (local) and Intercités de nuit (night trains) services operated by the SNCF. The station is located 1,056 m (3,465 ft) above sea level.

== Train services ==
The following services currently call at Mérens-les-Vals:

- night service (Intercités de nuit) Paris–Toulouse–Pamiers–Latour-de-Carol
- local service (TER Occitanie) Toulouse–Foix–Latour-de-Carol-Enveitg
