= Foix station =

Railway station in Foix, France

Foix
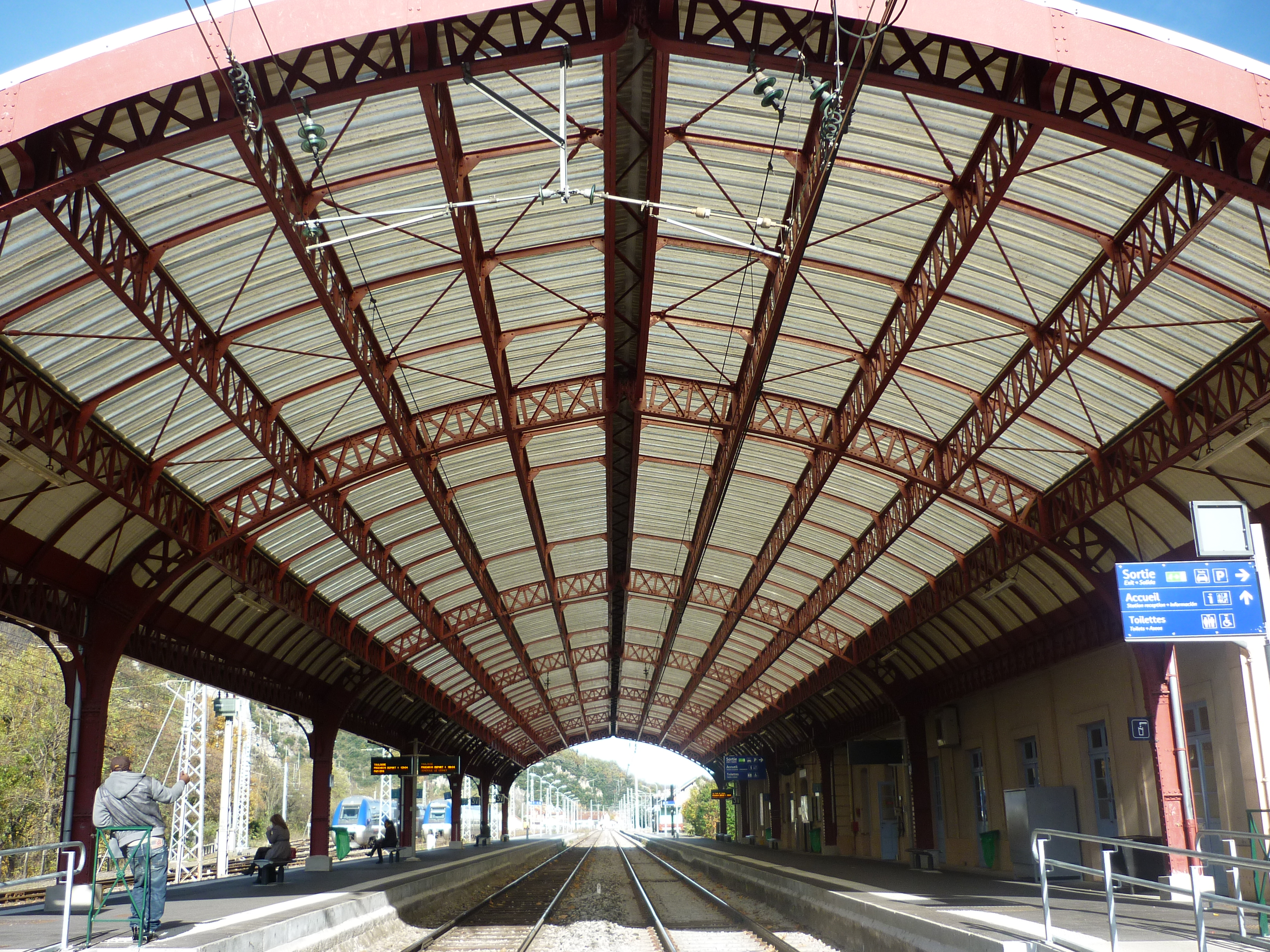
- Foix railway station

General information
- Location: Foix, Ariège, Occitanie; France
- Coordinates: 42°58′12″N 1°36′24″E
- Line: Portet-Saint-Simon–Puigcerdà railway
- Platforms: 2
- Tracks: 11

Other information
- Station code: 87611616

History
- Opened: 7 April 1862

Services
Preceding station	SNCF	Following station
Pamiers towards Paris-Austerlitz	Intercités (night)	Tarascon-sur-Ariège towards Latour-de-Carol
Preceding station	TER Occitanie	Following station
Saint-Jean-de-Verges towards Toulouse	11	Tarascon-sur-Ariège towards Latour-de-Carol
Location
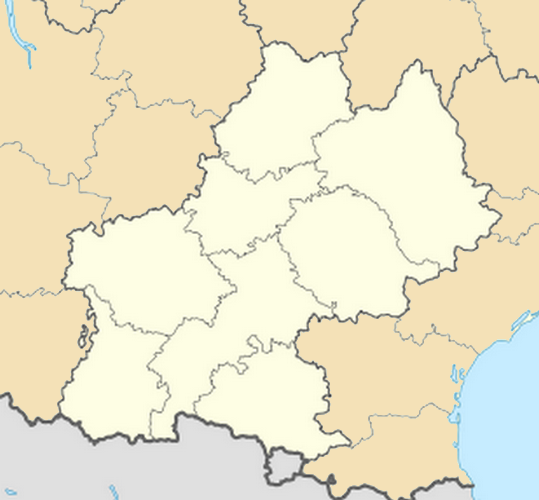
- Location within Midi-Pyrénées Location within France

Foix is a railway station in Foix, Occitanie, France. The station is on the Portet-Saint-Simon–Puigcerdà railway. The station is served by TER (local) and Intercités de nuit (night trains) services operated by the SNCF.

== Train services ==
The following services currently call at Foix:

- night service (Intercités de nuit) Paris–Toulouse–Pamiers–Latour-de-Carol
- local service (TER Occitanie) Toulouse–Foix–Latour-de-Carol-Enveitg
