= Saint-Jean-de-Verges station =

Railway station in Saint-Jean-de-Verges, France

Saint-Jean-de-Verges

General information
- Location: Saint-Jean-de-Verges, Ariège, Occitanie, France
- Coordinates: 43°00′45″N 1°36′29″E
- Line: Portet-Saint-Simon–Puigcerdà railway
- Platforms: 1
- Tracks: 1

Other information
- Station code: 87611624

Services
Preceding station	TER Occitanie	Following station
Varilhes towards Toulouse	11	Foix towards Latour-de-Carol
Location
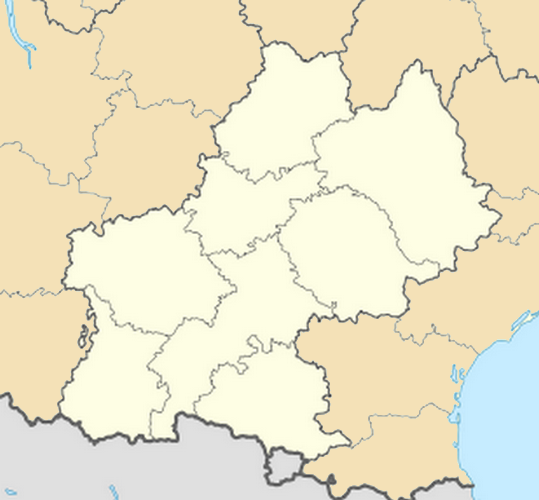
- Location within Midi-Pyrénées Location within France

Saint-Jean-de-Verges is a railway station in Saint-Jean-de-Verges, Occitanie, France. The station is on the Portet-Saint-Simon–Puigcerdà railway. The station is served by TER (local) services operated by the SNCF.

== Train services ==
The following services currently call at Saint-Jean-de-Verges:

- local service (TER Occitanie) Toulouse–Foix–Latour-de-Carol-Enveitg
