= Varilhes station =

Railway station in Varilhes, France

Varilhes
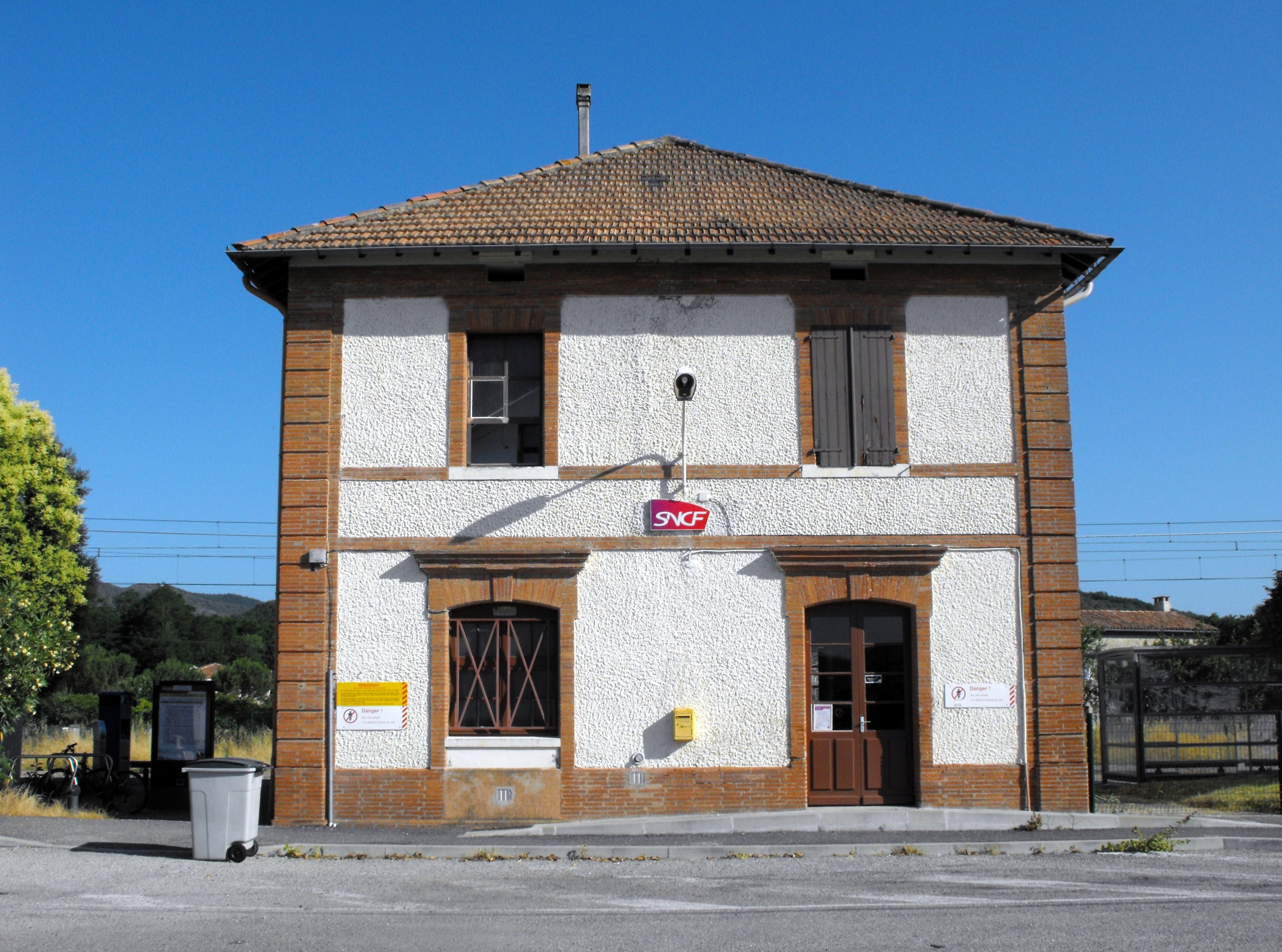
- Varilhes railway station

General information
- Location: Varilhes, Ariège, Occitanie; France
- Coordinates: 43°02′29″N 1°37′43″E
- Line: Portet-Saint-Simon–Puigcerdà railway
- Platforms: 2
- Tracks: 2

Other information
- Station code: 87611327

History
- Opened: 7 April 1862

Services
Preceding station	TER Occitanie	Following station
Pamiers towards Toulouse	11	Saint-Jean-de-Verges towards Latour-de-Carol
Location
- Location within Occitanie Location within France

Varilhes is a railway station in Varilhes, Occitanie, France. The station is on the Portet-Saint-Simon–Puigcerdà railway. The station is served by TER (local) services operated by the SNCF.

== Train services ==
The following services currently call at Varilhes:

- local service (TER Occitanie) Toulouse–Foix–Latour-de-Carol-Enveitg
