= Lunea =

Lunea may refer to:

- Lunea, opera by Heinz Holliger
- Corail Lunéa rail service Intercités de Nuit
- Lunea, proposed but not accepted as a new genus in the Guaireaceae ferns Osmundaceae
