= Puigcerdà railway station =

Railway station in Puigcerdà, Catalonia, Spain

Coordinates: 42°25′46″N 1°55′29″E

Puigcerdà

General information
- Location: Carrer de l'Estació, Puigcerdà; Spain
- Elevation: 1,146 m (3,760 ft)
- Owner: Administrador de Infraestructuras Ferroviarias
- Operator: Renfe Operadora
- Line: R3 (Rodalies de Catalunya)
- Platforms: 2
- Tracks: 3

History
- Opened: 1922

Passengers
- 35.000 /year

Services
| Preceding station | Rodalies de Catalunya | Following station |
|---|---|---|
| Urtx-Alp towards L'Hospitalet de Llobregat | R3 | Latour-de-Carol-Enveitg Terminus |
Location

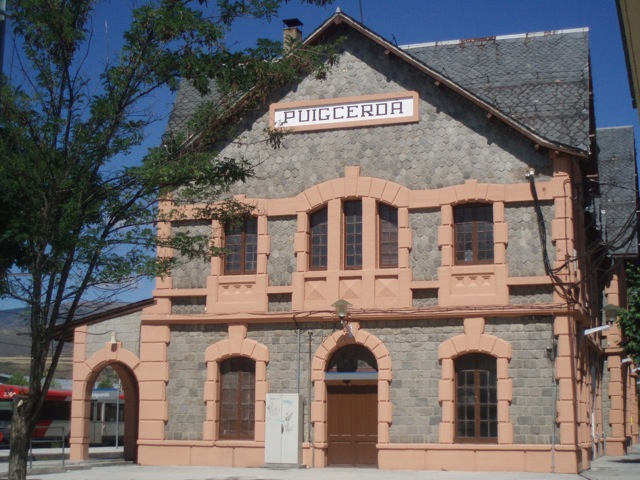

Puigcerdà railway station serves the town of Puigcerdà and the Baixa Cerdanya region, located on the Ripoll-Puigcerdà line managed by Adif. Currently, it is only served by R3 trains of Rodalies de Catalunya, but in the past, standard gauge trains from SNCF used to stop at this station. Nowadays, the international station role is exclusively assumed by La Tour de Carol-Enveitg. It is listed in the Inventory of Architectural Heritage of Catalonia.

== History ==
This station on the Trans-Pyrenean Railway, as the Ripoll-Puigcerdà line was known, was inaugurated at the end of 1922 when the section between La Molina and Puigcerdà was opened, a few months after the opening of the Ribes de Freser - La Molina section. Six years later, in 1928, the line was extended to La Tour de Carol. In 1929, the Porté-La Tour de Carol line of standard gauge reached the station, completing the cross-border connection and inaugurating the Trans-Pyrenean line.

In 1967, SNCF trains ceased arriving at the station, with the route being shortened to La Tour de Carol.

Currently, only three tracks are in use, two of which are served by two platforms connected by level crossings. The passenger building has two floors and is located on the right side of the tracks. The main platform is equipped with a canopy along the entire passenger building. Although they are not in use, the station has two standard gauge tracks theoretically ready to accommodate standard gauge trains, as they are electrified and served by a central platform. However, these tracks are overgrown and in a state that makes their use unfeasible. There used to be an underground passage, now blocked, linking to these platforms. In the past, the station had more tracks of both gauges, most of which are still present but no longer connected to the main tracks and are without overhead wiring.

In 2016, the station recorded 35,000 passengers.
