= Intercités de nuit =

French overnight passenger rail services

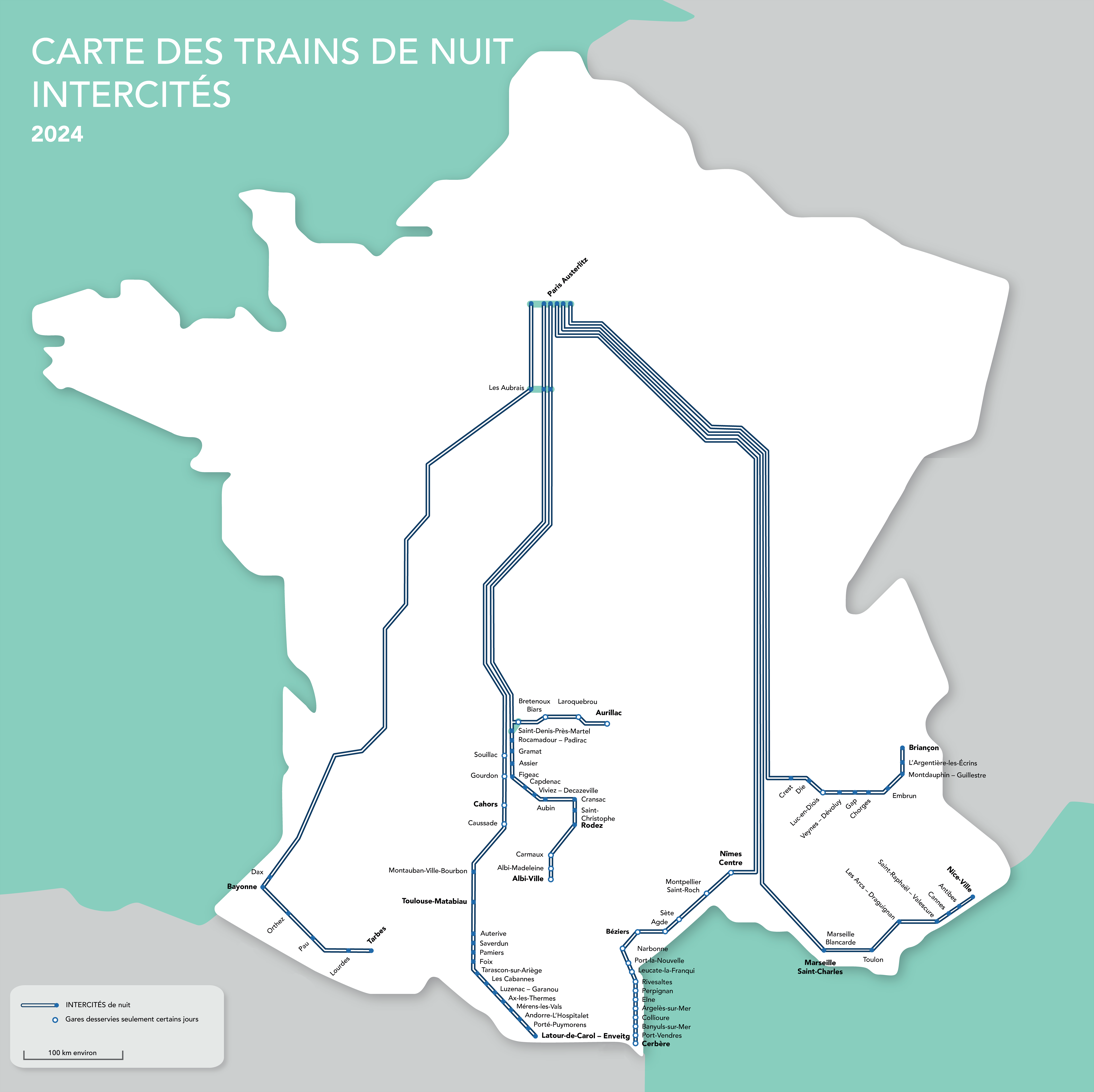
- Route map as of 2024

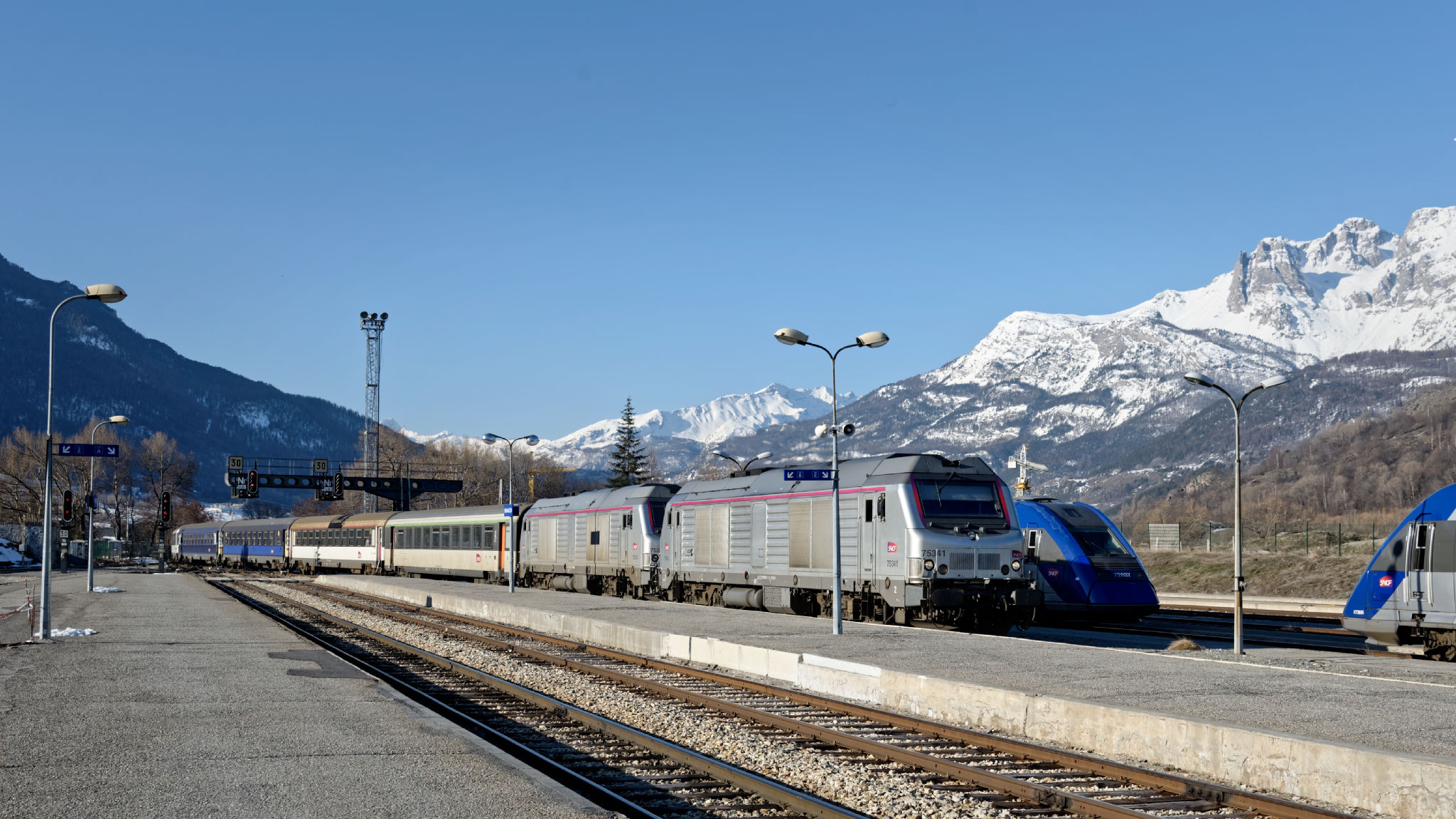
- Intercités de Nuit arriving in Briançon after its journey from Paris

Overview
- Operator: SNCF
- Locale: France
- Dates of operation: 2012–present
- Predecessor: Corail Lunéa, Lunéa

Other
- Website: www.sncf-voyageurs.com/en/travel-with-us/in-france/intercites/overnight-travel/

Intercités de Nuit is a brand name used by France’s national railway company, SNCF, to denote overnight passenger rail services in France. It was known as Corail Lunéa before 2009 and as Lunéa from 2010 to 2012. In 2012 the brand was reintegrated into the main Intercités network.

Between 2013 and 2017, most services were cancelled due to budget cuts. By early 2018 only two routes, from Paris to Briançon and from Paris to Toulouse/Latour de Carol, were still in operation.

In 2018 the French government announced it would continue financing the remaining routes, and would commit €30 million to renovating the remaining couchette carriages. This involved the replacement of sleeping berths, refurbishment of bathrooms, and the installation of electrical outlets and Wi-Fi.

In 2020 the network was relaunched in response to growing demand for night trains, particularly over climate concerns. Transport Minister Jean-Baptiste Djebbari announced that this would begin in 2021 with the re-introduction of the Paris-Nice and Paris-Tarbes services, with an aim for "around 10" overnight services to be running by 2030. In 2025 the government announced it would begin procurement of new rolling stock for the Intercités de Nuit network, including at least 180 sleeper cars and 30 locomotives, which it hoped would be in service as early as 2030.

== Comfort ==
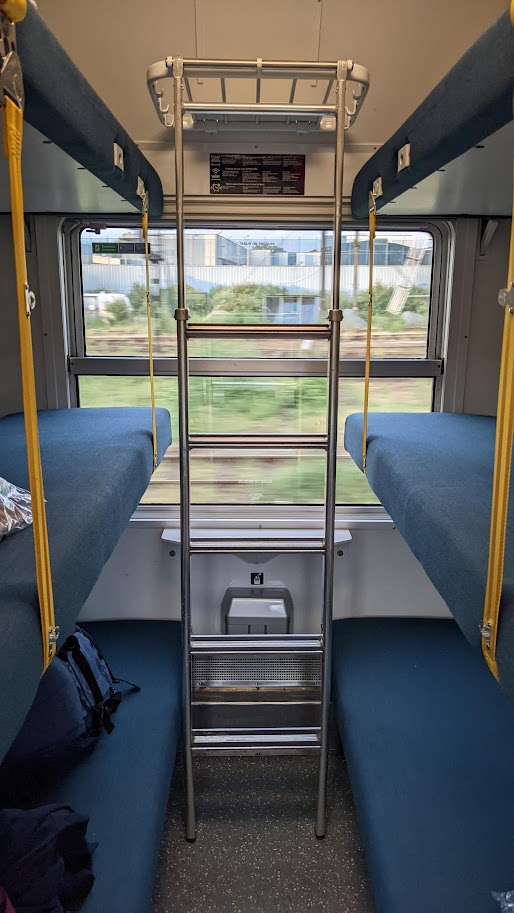
The interior of a refurbished second class couchette

Intercités de Nuit services are unusual for modern European night trains by consisting only of shared couchette cars and seating cars; sleeping cars containing private one- and two-bed compartments were withdrawn from service in 2007. The Corail carriages currently in use were constructed in the 1970s and 1980s, although some have been recently renovated.

Three different comfort levels are provided:

- First class couchette (A^{9}c^{9}ux): four berths per compartment. A pillow and sleeping bags are provided on each berth, along with mineral water and a kit containing earplugs and an eye mask. Toilets and washrooms are available at either end of the carriage. These compartments can be reserved for one, two or three passengers only by payment of a special supplement.

- Second class couchette (B^{10}c^{10}ux or B^{8}c^{8}ux): sixth berths per compartment. A pillow and sleeping bags are provided on each berth, along with mineral water and a kit containing earplugs and an eye mask. Toilets and washrooms are available at either end of the carriage. These compartments can be reserved for four or five passengers by payment of a special supplement.

- Second class seats (A^{10}tuh): reclining seats in a 2+1 configuration. Neither pillows nor blanket are provided.

No dining or bar cars remain in operation, but a service car (B^{8}c^{8}ux) is present on most routes where drinks and snacks can be purchased from onboard staff, and where pre-booked bicycles can be transported. Food can also be preorded for delivery to compartments in the morning or evening.

Female-only compartments are available to be booked. No showers are available on board, but passengers travelling in first class couchettes are entitled to use the shower facilities at Paris-Austerlitz and Toulouse-Matabiau free of charge.

In 2025 the French government put out a tender for new rolling stock, which it specified should have a range of accommodation options including "reclining seats, couchette-style compartments for families or groups, individual pods for single travellers, two-berth sleeping compartments with washing facilities and luxury two-berth compartments with a private shower and toilet", similar to ÖBB's Nightjet New Generation. It hoped that these new trains would be in operation as soon as 2030. However in late 2026 these plans were abandoned after the only submitted offer, from manufacturer CAF, was deemed unreliable, and following concerns about the cost of the project The order will go ahead only for new locomotives, and plans will be explored for further refurbishment of the existing carriages.

== Network in 2026 ==
As of 2026, the Intercités de Nuit network consists of the following lines:

| Route | Stops | Frequency | Remarks |
|---|---|---|---|
| Paris - Briançon | Paris-Austerlitz - Crest - Die - Luc-en-Diois - Veynes-Dévoluy - Gap - Chorges - Embrun - Montdauphin-Guillestre - L'Argentière-les Écrins - Briançon | Daily | This train is sometimes coupled with the service to Nice as far as Valence. |
| Paris - Nice | Paris-Austerlitz - Marseille-Blancarde - Toulon - Les Arcs-Draguignan - Saint-Raphaël-Valescure - Cannes - Antibes - Nice-Ville | Daily | This train is sometimes coupled with the service to Briançon or Cerbère as far as Valence. |
| Paris - Toulouse | Paris-Austerlitz - Les Aubrais - Souillac - Gourdon - Cahors - Caussade - Montauban-Ville-Bourbon - Toulouse-Matabiau | Daily | This train is coupled with coaches that continue to Latour-de-Carol several days per week (see below). |
| Paris - Aurillac | Paris-Austerlitz - Les Aubrais - Saint-Denis-près-Martel - Bretenoux - Laroquebrou - Aurillac | Daily | This train is typically coupled with the service to Albi as far as Brive. |
| Paris - Rodez / Albi | Paris-Austerlitz - Les Aubrais - Saint-Denis-près-Martel - Rocamadour-Padirac - Gramat - Assier - Figeac - Capdenac - Viviez-Decazeville - Aubin - Cransac - Saint-Christophe - Rodez - Carmaux - Albi-Madeleine - Albi-Ville | Daily to Rodez (runs to Albi on Fridays only) | This train is typically coupled with the service to Aurillac as far as Brive. |
| Paris - Tarbes | Paris-Austerlitz - Facture - Dax - Saint-Vincent-de-Tyrosse - Bayonne - Orthez - Pau - Lourdes - Tarbes | Weekdays only | |
| Paris - Latour-de-Carol | Paris-Austerlitz - Les Aubrais - Auterive - Saverdun - Pamiers - Foix - Tarascon-sur-Ariège - Les Cabannes - Luzenac-Garanou - Ax-les-Thermes - Mérens-les-Vals - Andorre-L'Hospitalet - Porté-Puymorens - Latour-de-Carol-Enveitg | Twice weekly | This train is typically coupled with the service to Toulouse and operates as an extension of that service. |
| Paris - Cerbère | Paris-Austerlitz - Nîmes - Montpellier - Sète - Agde - Béziers - Narbonne - Port-la-Nouvelle - Leucate - Rivesaltes - Perpignan - Elne - Argelès-sur-Mer - Collioure - Port-Vendres - Banyuls-sur-Mer - Cerbère | Twice weekly | This train historically travelled via Toulouse but since 2023 it has been diverted to pass through the Rhône valley and serve new stations on the Mediterranean. This train is sometimes coupled with the service to Nice as far as Valence. |

== Former network ==
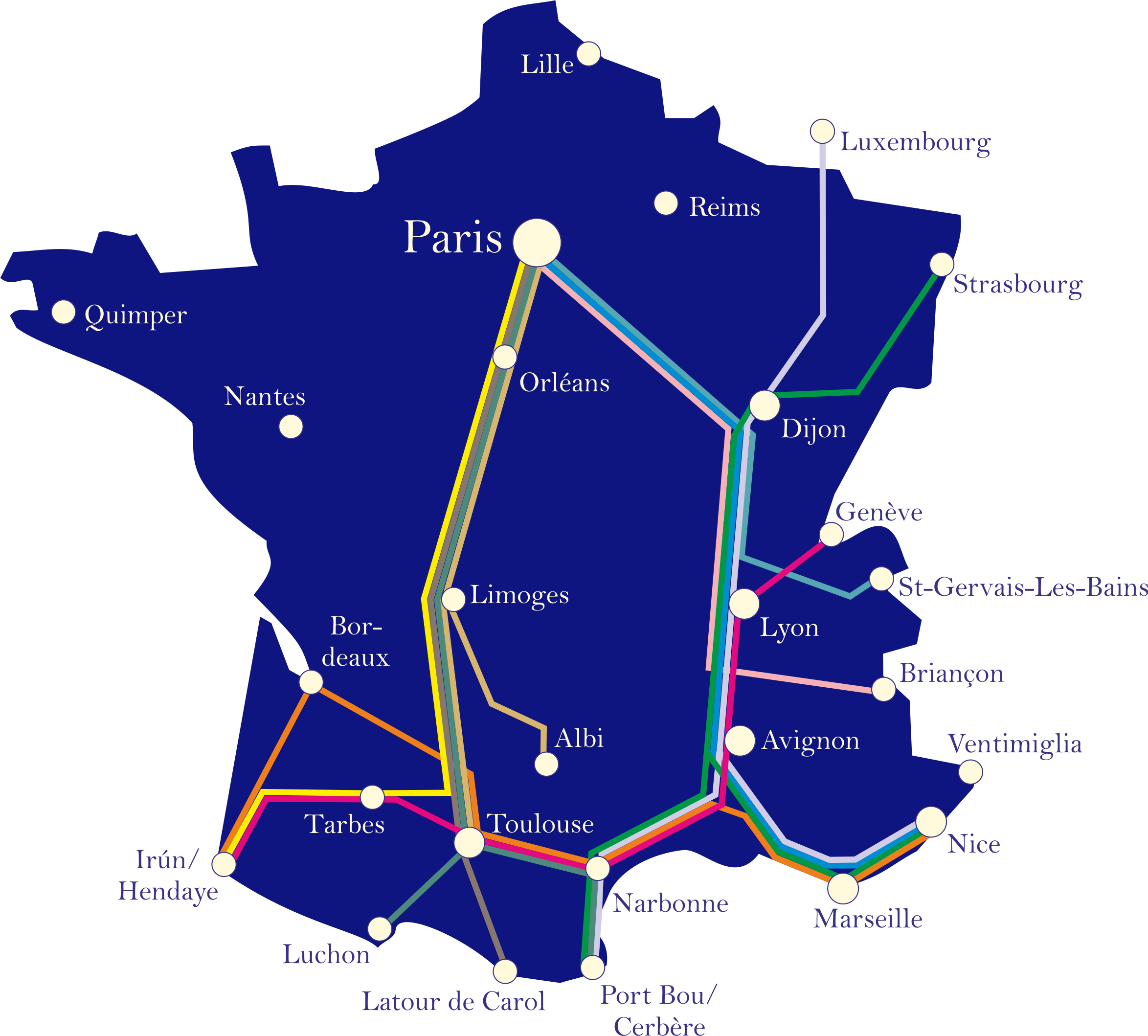
Network map, 2012.

At the point of integration into the Intercités network in 2012, the network (then Lunéa) consisted of the following lines:

| Route | Stops | Frequency |
|---|---|---|
| Paris - Irun / Tarbes | Paris-Austerlitz - Les Aubrais - Morcenx - Dax - Bayonne - Biarritz - Guéthary - Saint-Jean-de-Luz-Ciboure - Les Deux-Jumeaux - Hendaye - Irun branch line: Dax - Orthez - Pau - Lourdes - Tarbes | daily |
| Paris - Nice | Paris-Austerlitz - Toulon - Les Arcs-Draguignan - Fréjus - Saint-Raphaël-Valescure - Cannes - Antibes - Nice-Ville | daily |
| Paris - Toulouse / Albi | Paris-Austerlitz - Les Aubrais - Souillac - Gourdon - Cahors - Caussade - Montauban-Ville-Bourbon - Toulouse-Matabiau branch line: Les Aubrais - Saint-Denis-près-Martel - Rocamadour-Padirac - Gramat - Assier - Figeac - Capdenac - Viviez-Decazeville - Aubin - Cransac - Saint-Christophe - Rodez - Carmaux - Albi-Madeleine - Albi-Ville | weekends only |
| Paris - Portbou / Latour-de-Carol / Luchon | Paris-Austerlitz - Les Aubrais - Vierzon - Limoges-Bénédictins - Castelnaudary - Carcassonne - Lézignan-Corbières - Narbonne - Perpignan - Elne - Argelès-sur-Mer - Collioure - Port-Vendres - Banyuls-sur-Mer - Cerbère - Portbou branch line: Limoges-Bénédictins - Auterive - Saverdun - Pamiers - Foix - Tarascon-sur-Ariège - Les Cabannes - Luzenac-Garanou - Ax-les-Thermes - Mérens-les-Vals - L'Hospitalet-près-l'Andorre - Porté-Puymorens - Latour-de-Carol-Enveitg branch line: Limoges-Bénédictins - Muret - Carbonne - Boussens - Saint-Gaudens - Montréjeau - Loures-Barbazan - Saléchan-Siradan - Marignac-Saint-Béat - Luchon | daily |
| Paris - Bourg-Saint-Maurice / Saint-Gervais-les-Bains | Paris-Austerlitz - Chambéry-Challes-les-Eaux - Albertville - Moûtiers-Salins-Brides-les-Bains - Aime-La Plagne - Landry - Bourg-Saint-Maurice branch line: Chambéry-Challes-les-Eaux - Aix-les-Bains-Le Revard - Rumilly - Annecy - La Roche-sur-Foron - Cluses - Sallanches-Combloux-Megève - Saint-Gervais-les-Bains-Le Fayet | weekends |
| Paris - Briançon | Paris-Austerlitz - Crest ... Gap ... Briançon | winter only |
| Hendaye - Nice | Hendaye - Saint-Jean-de-Luz-Ciboure - Biarritz - Bayonne - Dax - Bordeaux-Saint-Jean - Marmande - Agen - Montauban-Ville-Bourbon - Toulouse-Matabiau - Marseille-Saint-Charles - Toulon - Les Arcs-Draguignan - Saint-Raphaël-Valescure - Cannes - Antibes - Nice-Ville | weekends only |
| Hendaye - Geneva | Hendaye - Saint-Jean-de-Luz-Ciboure - Biarritz - Bayonne - Dax - Puyoô - Orthez - Pau - Coarraze-Nay - Lourdes - Tarbes - Lannemezan - Saint-Gaudens - Toulouse-Matabiau - Valence-Ville - Lyon-Part-Dieu - Genève-Cornavin | summer and holidays |
| Strasbourg / Luxembourg - Nice / Portbou | Strasbourg - Sélestat - Colmar - Mulhouse - Belfort - Montbéliard - Besançon-Viotte - Lyon (no stop) - Avignon-Centre - Arles - Marseille-Saint-Charles - Toulon - Les Arcs-Draguignan - Saint-Raphaël-Valescure - Cannes - Antibes - Nice-Ville branch line: Luxembourg - Thionville - Metz-Ville - Nancy-Ville - Toul - Neufchâteau - Culmont-Chalindrey - Lyon branch line: Lyon - Nîmes - Montpellier-Saint-Roch - Sète - Agde - Béziers - Narbonne - Perpignan - Elne - Argelès-sur-Mer - Collioure - Port-Vendres - Banyuls-sur-Mer - Cerbère - Portbou | daily (Portbou branch weekends only) |

== See also ==
- Intercités
- SNCF
- Rail transport in France
- Train categories in Europe
