= Luzenac =

Commune in Occitanie, France

- Commune
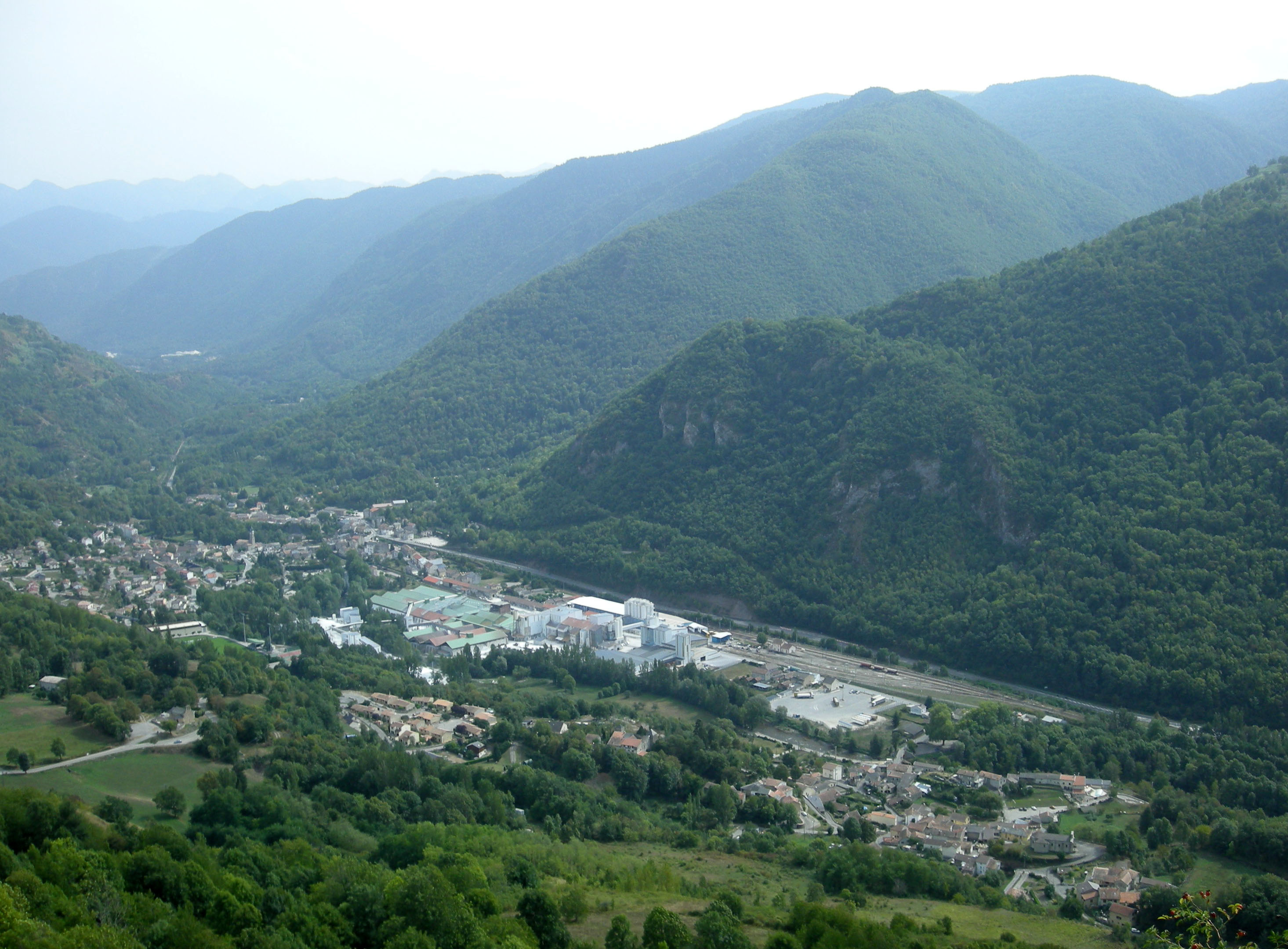
- A general view of Luzenac
- Location of Luzenac
- Location within France Location within Occitanie
- Coordinates: 42°45′53″N 1°45′52″E
- Country: France
- Region: Occitania
- Department: Ariège
- Arrondissement: Foix
- Canton: Haute-Ariège

Government
  - Mayor (2020–2026): Christian Loubet
- Area^{1}: 26.43 km^{2} (10.20 sq mi)
- Elevation: 608 m (1,995 ft)
- Highest elevation: 2,247 m (7,372 ft)
- Lowest elevation: 594 m (1,949 ft)
- Population (2023): 512
  - Density: 19.4/km^{2} (50.2/sq mi)
- Time zone: UTC+01:00 (CET)
  - Summer (DST): UTC+02:00 (CEST)
- INSEE/Postal code: 09176 /09250
- ^{1} French Land Register data, which excludes lakes, ponds, glaciers > 1 km^{2} (0.386 sq mi or 247 acres) and river estuaries.

Luzenac (French pronunciation: [lyznak]; Occitan: Lusenac) is a commune in the Ariège department in southwestern France. Luzenac-Garanou station has rail connections to Toulouse, Foix and Latour-de-Carol.

== Population ==
Historical population
Year	Pop.	±% p.a.
1968	956	—
1975	848	−1.70%
1982	816	−0.55%
1990	690	−2.07%
1999	632	−0.97%
2007	635	+0.06%
2012	556	−2.62%
2017	538	−0.66%
2023	512	−0.82%
Source: INSEE

== Sports ==
- Luzenac is also home to the football club Luzenac AP.

== See also ==
- Communes of the Ariège department
