= Les Cabannes, Ariège =

Commune in Occitanie, France

Les Cabannes
- Commune
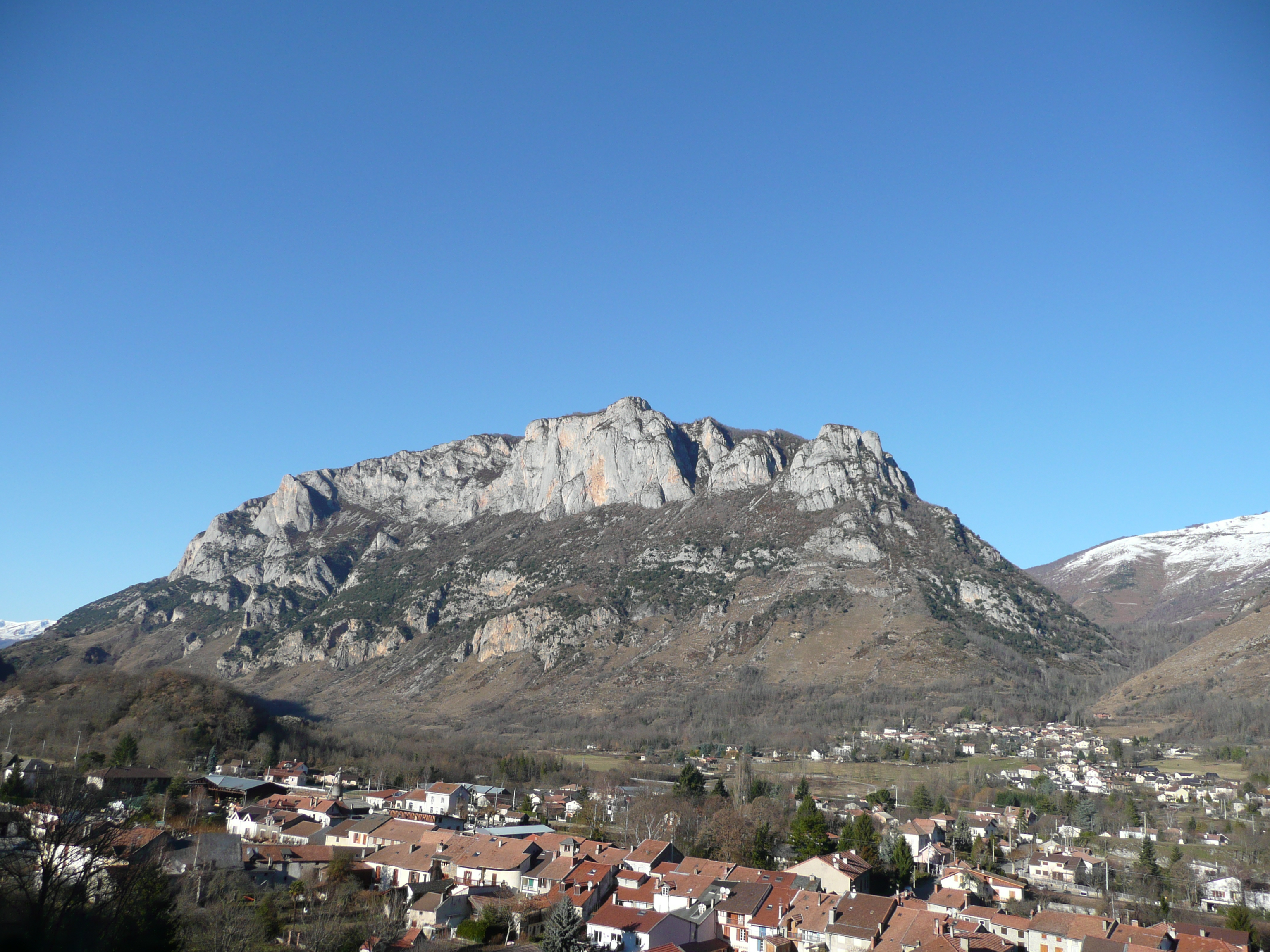
- Le Quié overlooking Les Cabannes
- Location of Les Cabannes
- Location within France Location within Occitanie
- Coordinates: 42°47′11″N 1°41′16″E
- Country: France
- Region: Occitania
- Department: Ariège
- Arrondissement: Foix
- Canton: Haute-Ariège

Government
  - Mayor (2020–2026): Daniel Géraud
- Area^{1}: 0.8 km^{2} (0.31 sq mi)
- Elevation: 535 m (1,755 ft)
- Highest elevation: 581 m (1,906 ft)
- Lowest elevation: 519 m (1,703 ft)
- Population (2023): 317
  - Density: 400/km^{2} (1,000/sq mi)
- Time zone: UTC+01:00 (CET)
  - Summer (DST): UTC+02:00 (CEST)
- INSEE/Postal code: 09070 /09310
- ^{1} French Land Register data, which excludes lakes, ponds, glaciers > 1 km^{2} (0.386 sq mi or 247 acres) and river estuaries.

Les Cabannes (French pronunciation: [le kaban]; Occitan: Las Cabanas) is a commune in the Ariège department in southwestern France. Les Cabannes station has rail connections to Toulouse, Foix and Latour-de-Carol.

== Population ==
Historical population
Year	Pop.	±% p.a.
1968	444	—
1975	470	+0.82%
1982	469	−0.03%
1990	332	−4.23%
1999	359	+0.87%
2007	341	−0.64%
2012	344	+0.18%
2017	333	−0.65%
2023	317	−0.82%
Source: INSEE

== See also ==
- Communes of the Ariège department
