= Varilhes =

Commune in Occitanie, France

- Commune
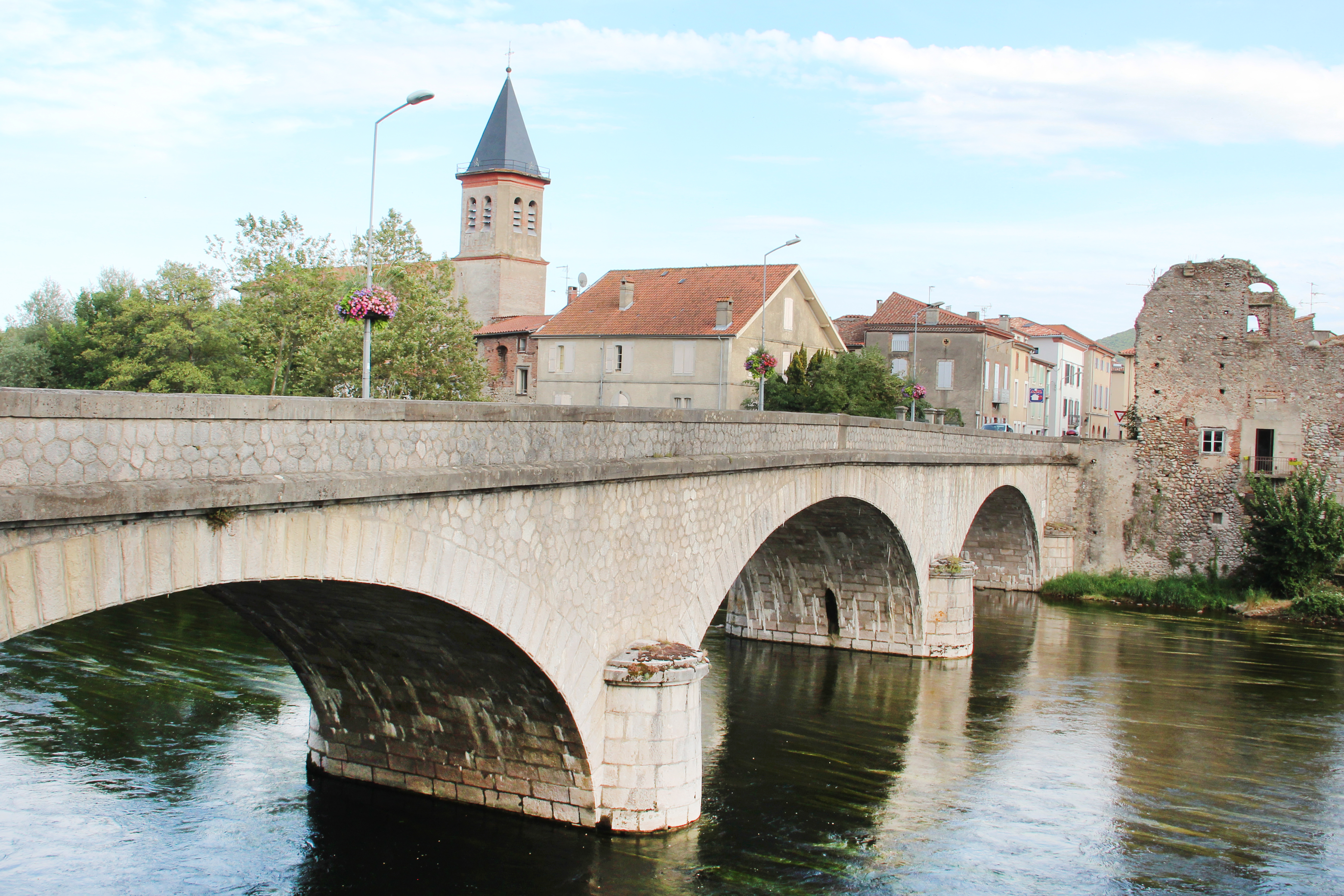
- Varilhes

- Coat of arms
- Location of Varilhes
- Location within France Location within Occitanie
- Coordinates: 43°02′47″N 1°37′45″E
- Country: France
- Region: Occitania
- Department: Ariège
- Arrondissement: Foix
- Canton: Val d'Ariège
- Intercommunality: CA Pays Foix-Varilhes

Government
  - Mayor (2020–2026): Martine Esteban
- Area^{1}: 11.76 km^{2} (4.54 sq mi)
- Elevation: 310 m (1,020 ft)
- Highest elevation: 592 m (1,942 ft)
- Lowest elevation: 309 m (1,014 ft)
- Population (2023): 3,487
  - Density: 296.5/km^{2} (768.0/sq mi)
- Time zone: UTC+01:00 (CET)
  - Summer (DST): UTC+02:00 (CEST)
- INSEE/Postal code: 09324 /09120
- ^{1} French Land Register data, which excludes lakes, ponds, glaciers > 1 km^{2} (0.386 sq mi or 247 acres) and river estuaries.

Varilhes (French pronunciation: [vaʁij]; Languedocien: Varilhas) is a commune in the Ariège department in southwestern France. Varilhes station has rail connections to Toulouse, Foix and Latour-de-Carol.

== Population ==
Inhabitants of Varilhes are called Varilhois in French.

Historical population
Year	Pop.	±% p.a.
1968	1,938	—
1975	1,888	−0.37%
1982	2,007	+0.88%
1990	2,327	+1.87%
1999	2,702	+1.67%
2007	2,848	+0.66%
2012	3,239	+2.61%
2017	3,424	+1.12%
2023	3,487	+0.30%
Source: INSEE

== See also ==
- Communes of the Ariège department
