= Mercus-Garrabet =

Commune in Occitanie, France

- Commune
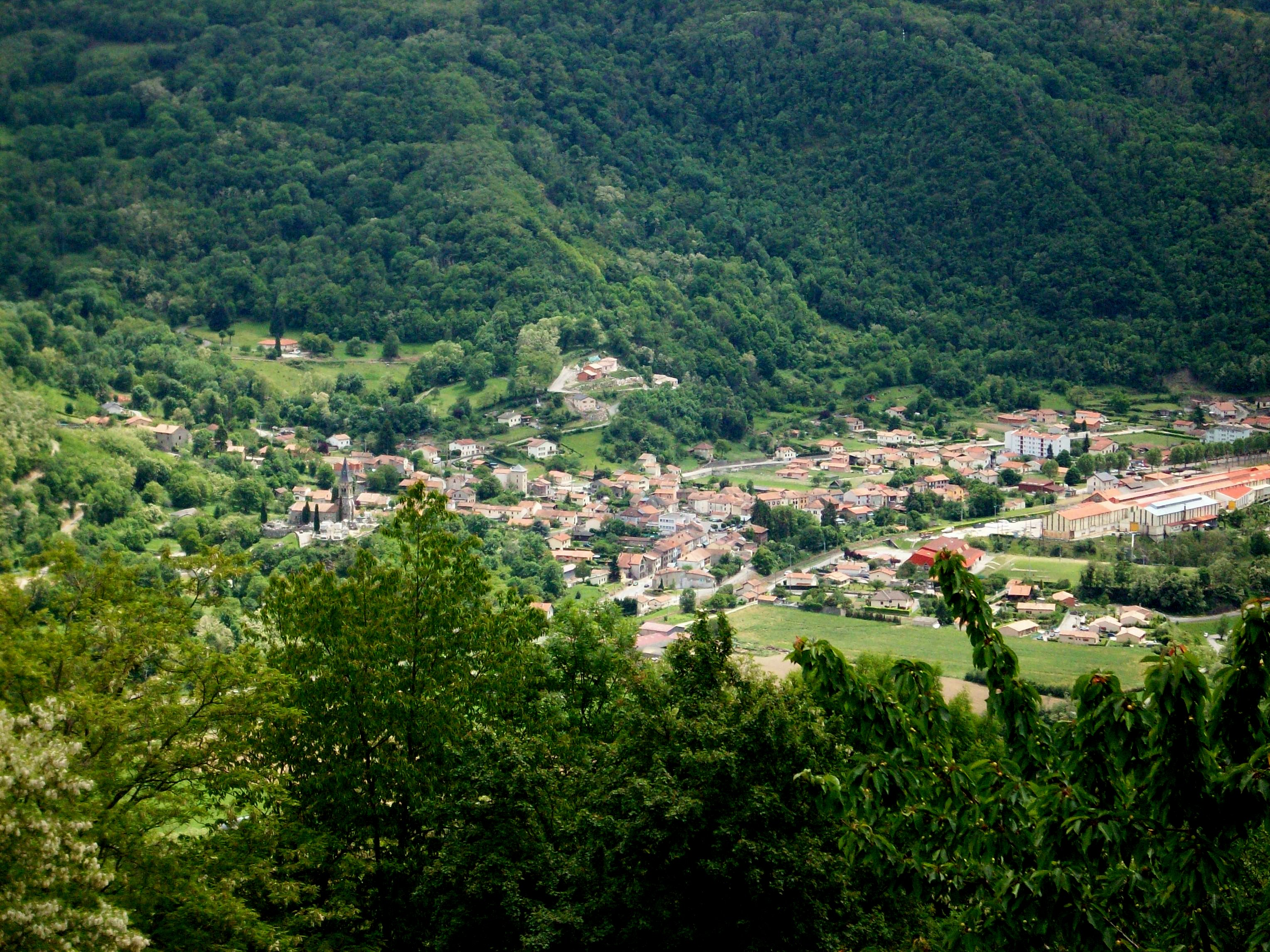
- A general view of Mercus-Garrabet
- Location of Mercus-Garrabet
- Location within France Location within Occitanie
- Coordinates: 42°52′50″N 1°37′52″E
- Country: France
- Region: Occitania
- Department: Ariège
- Arrondissement: Foix
- Canton: Sabarthès
- Intercommunality: Pays de Tarascon

Government
  - Mayor (2020–2026): Patricia Testa
- Area^{1}: 14.79 km^{2} (5.71 sq mi)
- Elevation: 480 m (1,570 ft)
- Highest elevation: 1,603 m (5,259 ft)
- Lowest elevation: 432 m (1,417 ft)
- Population (2023): 1,238
  - Density: 83.71/km^{2} (216.8/sq mi)
- Time zone: UTC+01:00 (CET)
  - Summer (DST): UTC+02:00 (CEST)
- INSEE/Postal code: 09188 /09400
- ^{1} French Land Register data, which excludes lakes, ponds, glaciers > 1 km^{2} (0.386 sq mi or 247 acres) and river estuaries.

Mercus-Garrabet is a commune in the Ariège department in southwestern France. In February 1965, it absorbed the former commune Amplaing.

== Population ==
Historical population
| Year | Pop. | ±% p.a. |
|---|---|---|
| 1968 | 869 | — |
| 1975 | 944 | +1.19% |
| 1982 | 972 | +0.42% |
| 1990 | 925 | −0.62% |
| 1999 | 1,005 | +0.93% |
| 2007 | 1,135 | +1.53% |
| 2012 | 1,143 | +0.14% |
| 2017 | 1,199 | +0.96% |
| 2023 | 1,238 | +0.53% |
Source: INSEE

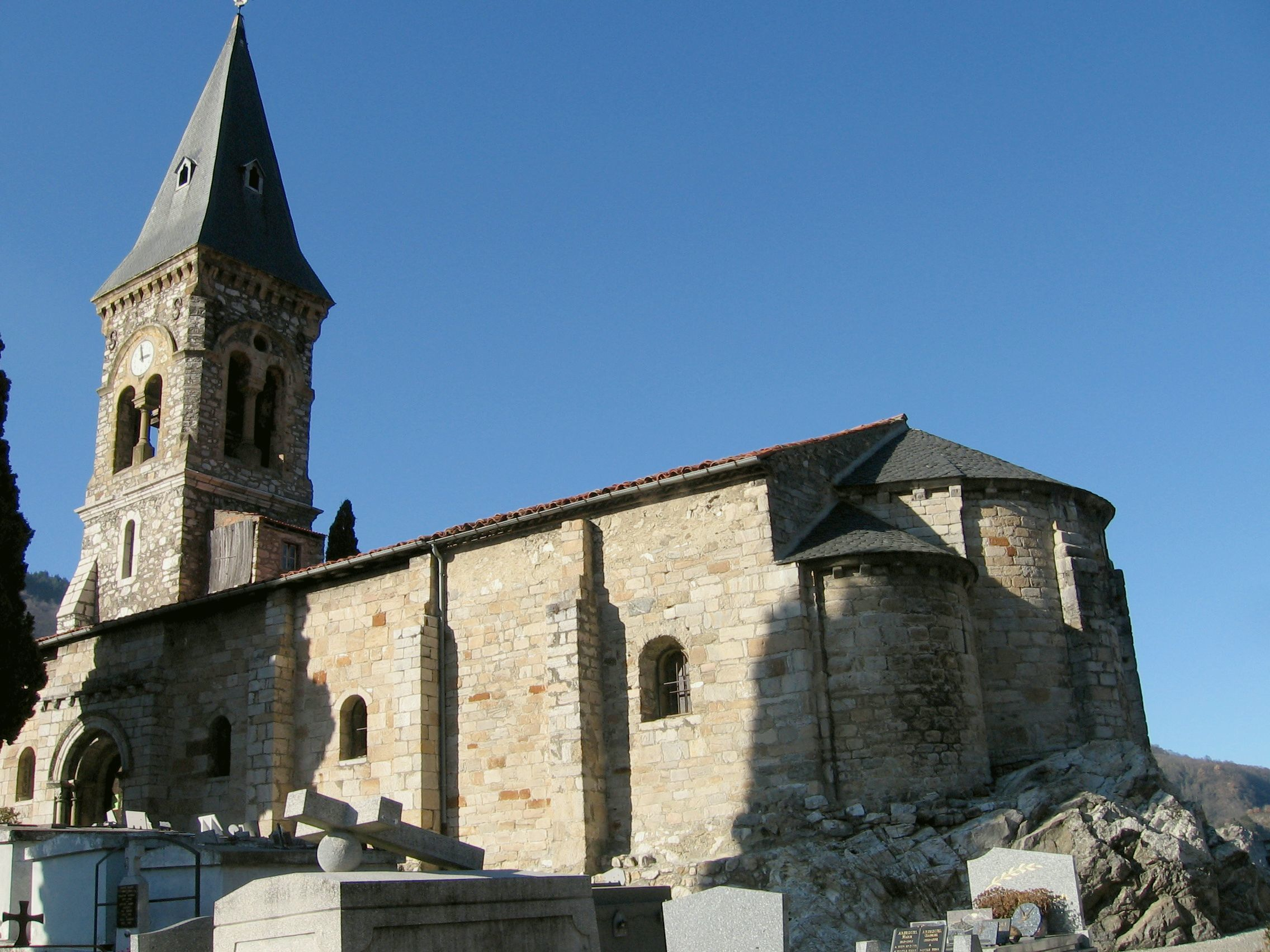
Mercus church

== See also ==
- Communes of the Ariège department
