= Saint-Paul-de-Jarrat =

Commune in Occitanie, France

- Commune
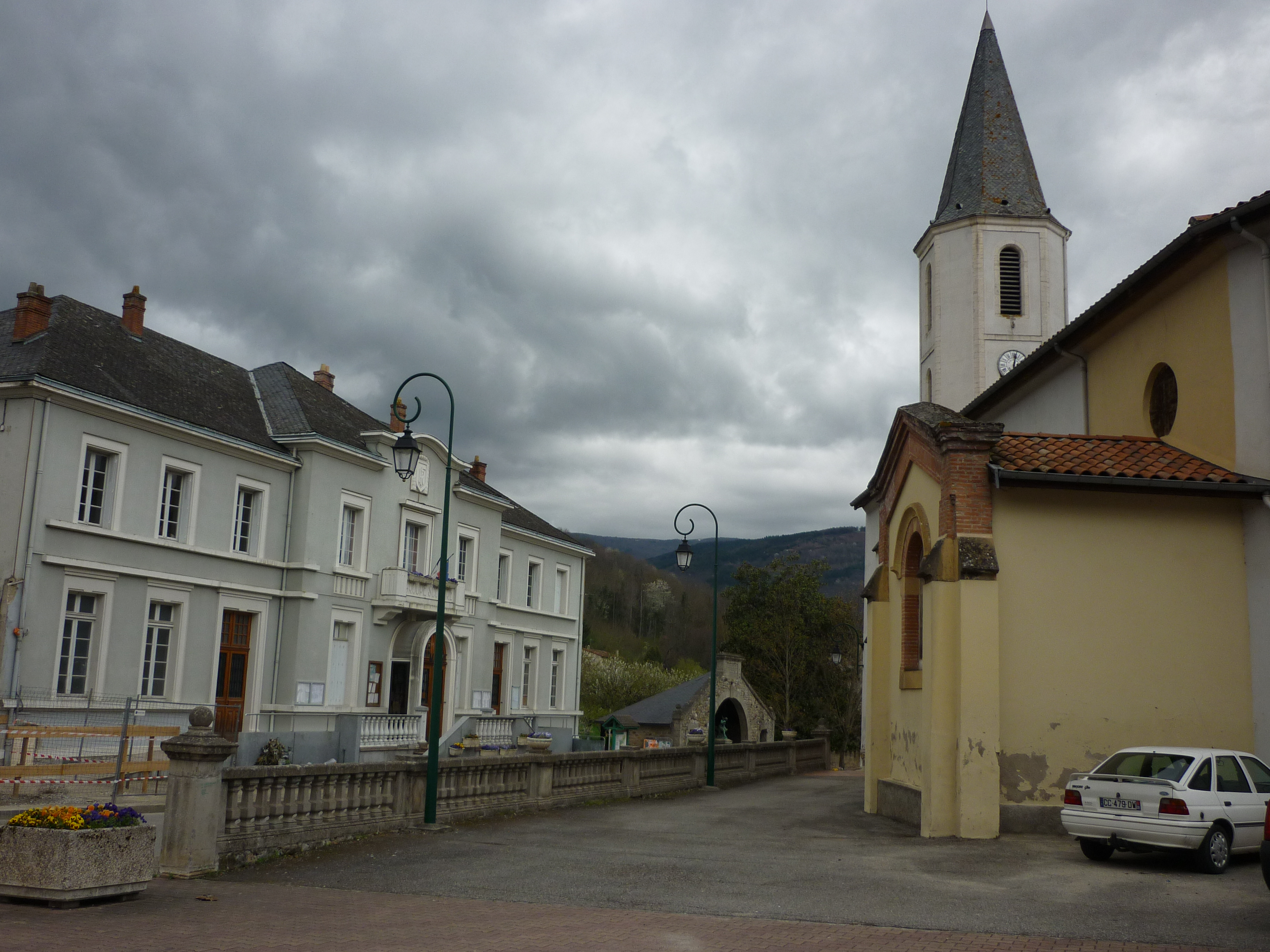
- Town hall and church
- Location of Saint-Paul-de-Jarrat
- Location within France Location within Occitanie
- Coordinates: 42°54′52″N 1°39′40″E
- Country: France
- Region: Occitania
- Department: Ariège
- Arrondissement: Foix
- Canton: Sabarthès
- Intercommunality: CA Pays Foix-Varilhes

Government
  - Mayor (2020–2026): Michel Tartié
- Area^{1}: 22.51 km^{2} (8.69 sq mi)
- Elevation: 461 m (1,512 ft)
- Highest elevation: 1,773 m (5,817 ft)
- Lowest elevation: 425 m (1,394 ft)
- Population (2023): 1,352
  - Density: 60.06/km^{2} (155.6/sq mi)
- Time zone: UTC+01:00 (CET)
  - Summer (DST): UTC+02:00 (CEST)
- INSEE/Postal code: 09272 /09000
- ^{1} French Land Register data, which excludes lakes, ponds, glaciers > 1 km^{2} (0.386 sq mi or 247 acres) and river estuaries.

Saint-Paul-de-Jarrat (French pronunciation: [sɛ̃ pɔl də ʒaʁa]; Languedocien: Sent Pau de Jarrat) is a commune in the Ariège department in southwestern France.

== Population ==
Historical population
Year	Pop.	±% p.a.
1968	1,103	—
1975	1,068	−0.46%
1982	1,100	+0.42%
1990	1,261	+1.72%
1999	1,224	−0.33%
2007	1,238	+0.14%
2012	1,254	+0.26%
2017	1,313	+0.92%
2023	1,352	+0.49%
Source: INSEE

Inhabitants of Saint-Paul-de-Jarrat are called Saint-Paulois in French.

== See also ==
- Communes of the Ariège department
