= Tarascon-sur-Ariège =

Commune in Occitanie, France

- Commune
- The Castélla

- Coat of arms
- Location of Tarascon-sur-Ariège
- Location within France Location within Occitanie
- Coordinates: 42°50′54″N 1°36′22″E
- Country: France
- Region: Occitania
- Department: Ariège
- Arrondissement: Foix
- Canton: Sabarthès
- Intercommunality: Pays de Tarascon

Government
  - Mayor (2020–2026): Alain Sutra
- Area^{1}: 8.65 km^{2} (3.34 sq mi)
- Elevation: 475 m (1,558 ft)
- Highest elevation: 1,187 m (3,894 ft)
- Lowest elevation: 463 m (1,519 ft)
- Population (2023): 3,085
  - Density: 357/km^{2} (924/sq mi)
- Time zone: UTC+01:00 (CET)
  - Summer (DST): UTC+02:00 (CEST)
- INSEE/Postal code: 09306 /09400
- ^{1} French Land Register data, which excludes lakes, ponds, glaciers > 1 km^{2} (0.386 sq mi or 247 acres) and river estuaries.

Tarascon-sur-Ariège (French pronunciation: [taʁaskɔ̃ syʁ aʁjɛʒ], literally Tarascon on Ariège; Languedocien: Tarascon d’Arièja) is a commune in the Ariège department in southwestern France. Tarascon-sur-Ariège station has rail connections to Toulouse, Foix and Latour-de-Carol.

== Population ==
Inhabitants of Tarascon-sur-Ariège are called Tarasconnais in French.

Historical population
| Year | Pop. | ±% p.a. |
|---|---|---|
| 1968 | 3,952 | — |
| 1975 | 4,197 | +0.86% |
| 1982 | 3,916 | −0.99% |
| 1990 | 3,533 | −1.28% |
| 1999 | 3,446 | −0.28% |
| 2007 | 3,493 | +0.17% |
| 2012 | 3,386 | −0.62% |
| 2017 | 3,044 | −2.11% |
| 2023 | 3,085 | +0.22% |
Source: INSEE

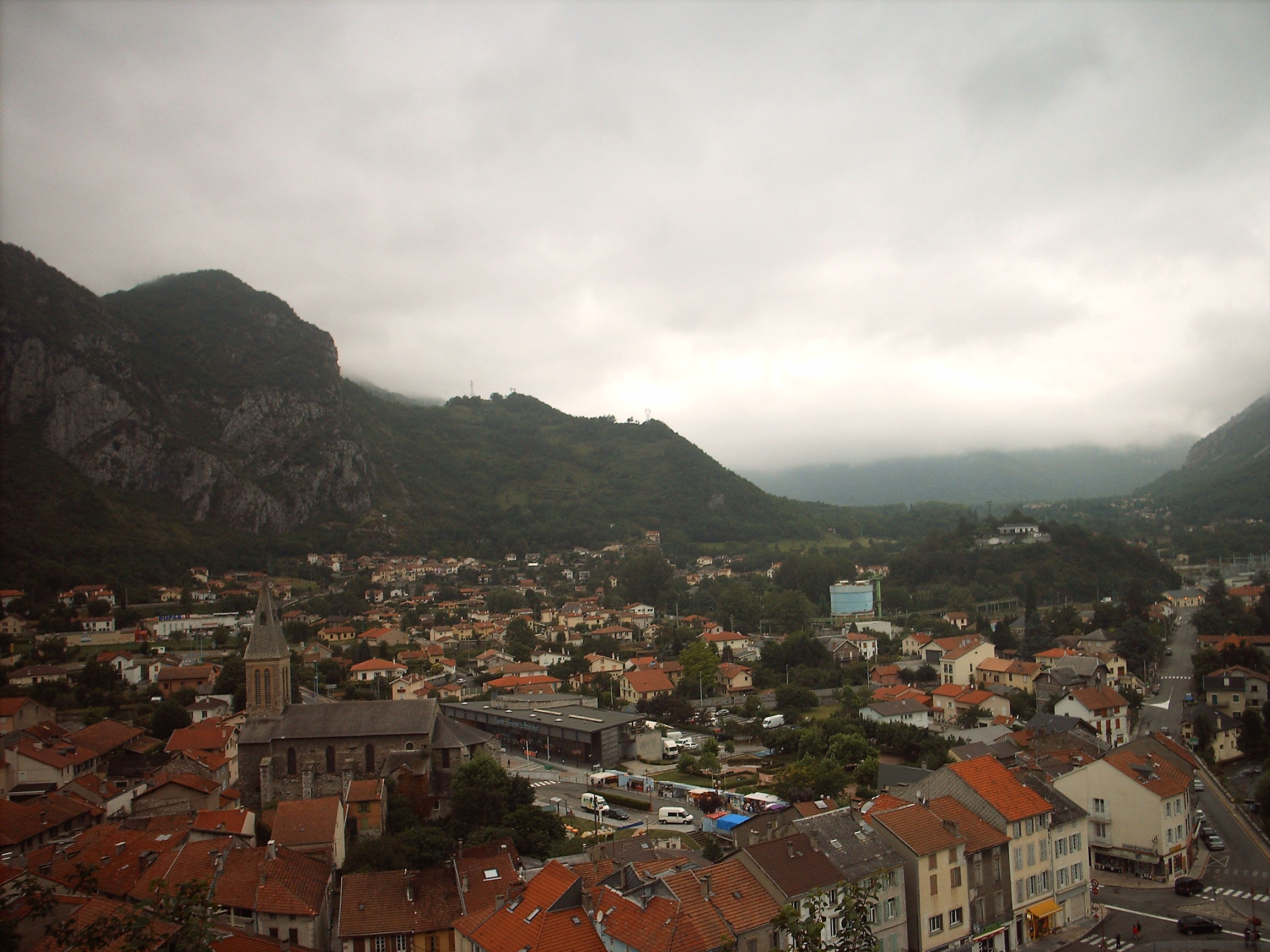
Town center

== See also ==
- Col de Port
- Communes of the Ariège department
