= Ornolac-Ussat-les-Bains =

Commune in Occitanie, France

- Commune
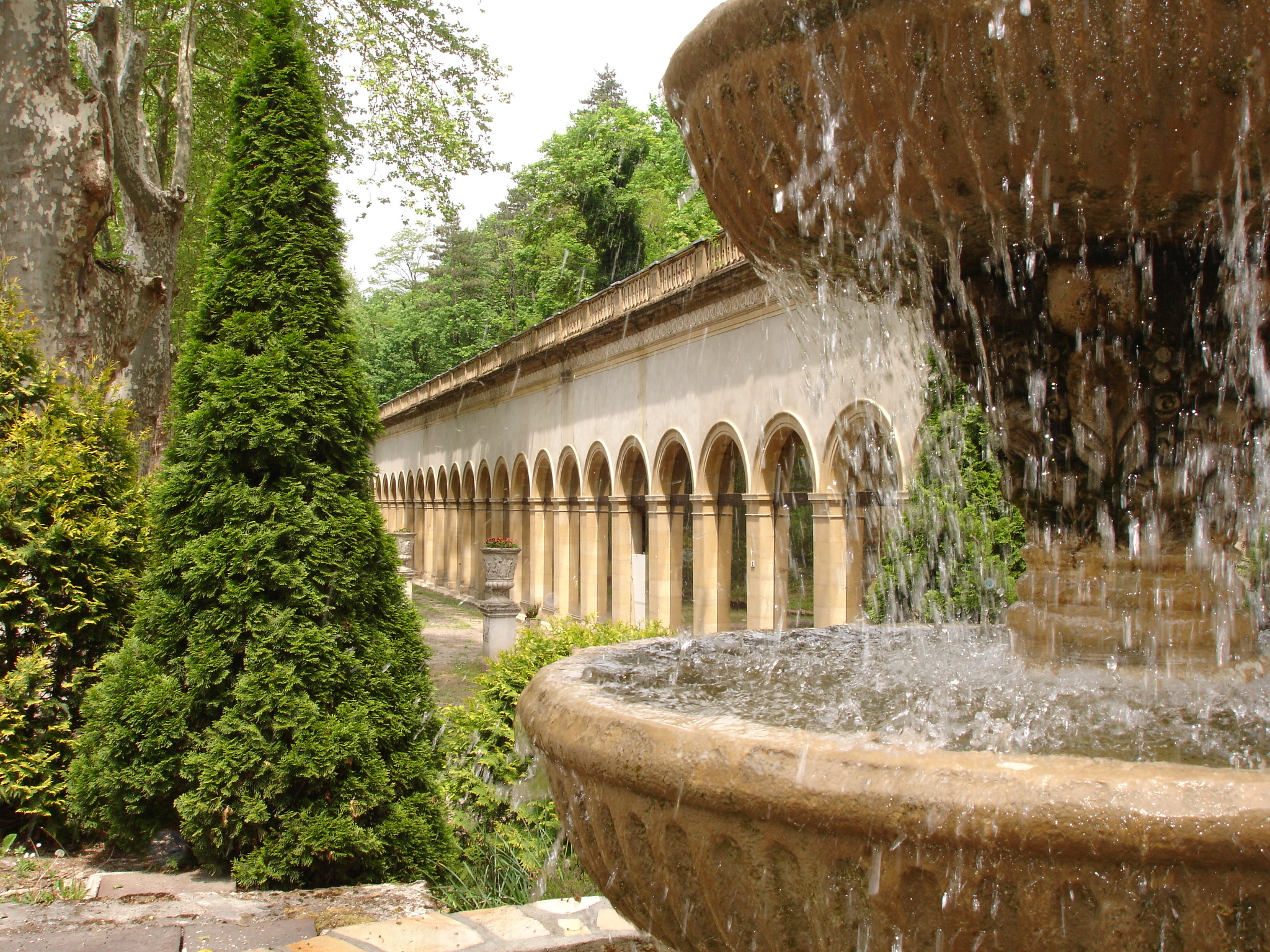
- The thermal baths in Ussat-les-Bains
- Location of Ornolac-Ussat-les-Bains
- Location within France Location within Occitanie
- Coordinates: 42°49′13″N 1°37′56″E
- Country: France
- Region: Occitania
- Department: Ariège
- Arrondissement: Foix
- Canton: Haute-Ariège
- Intercommunality: Pays de Tarascon

Government
  - Mayor (2020–2026): Benoît Araud
- Area^{1}: 11.99 km^{2} (4.63 sq mi)
- Elevation: 485 m (1,591 ft)
- Highest elevation: 1,482 m (4,862 ft)
- Lowest elevation: 481 m (1,578 ft)
- Population (2023): 247
  - Density: 20.6/km^{2} (53.4/sq mi)
- Time zone: UTC+01:00 (CET)
  - Summer (DST): UTC+02:00 (CEST)
- INSEE/Postal code: 09221 /09400
- ^{1} French Land Register data, which excludes lakes, ponds, glaciers > 1 km^{2} (0.386 sq mi or 247 acres) and river estuaries.

Ornolac-Ussat-les-Bains (Occitan Ornolac e Ussat) is a commune in the Ariège department in southwestern France.

== Population ==
Inhabitants are called Ornolacois in French.

Historical population
Year	Pop.	±% p.a.
1968	236	—
1975	243	+0.42%
1982	226	−1.03%
1990	215	−0.62%
1999	221	+0.31%
2007	217	−0.23%
2012	215	−0.19%
2017	236	+1.88%
2023	247	+0.76%
Source: INSEE

== See also ==
- Communes of the Ariège department
