= Montgailhard =

Commune in Occitanie, France

- Commune
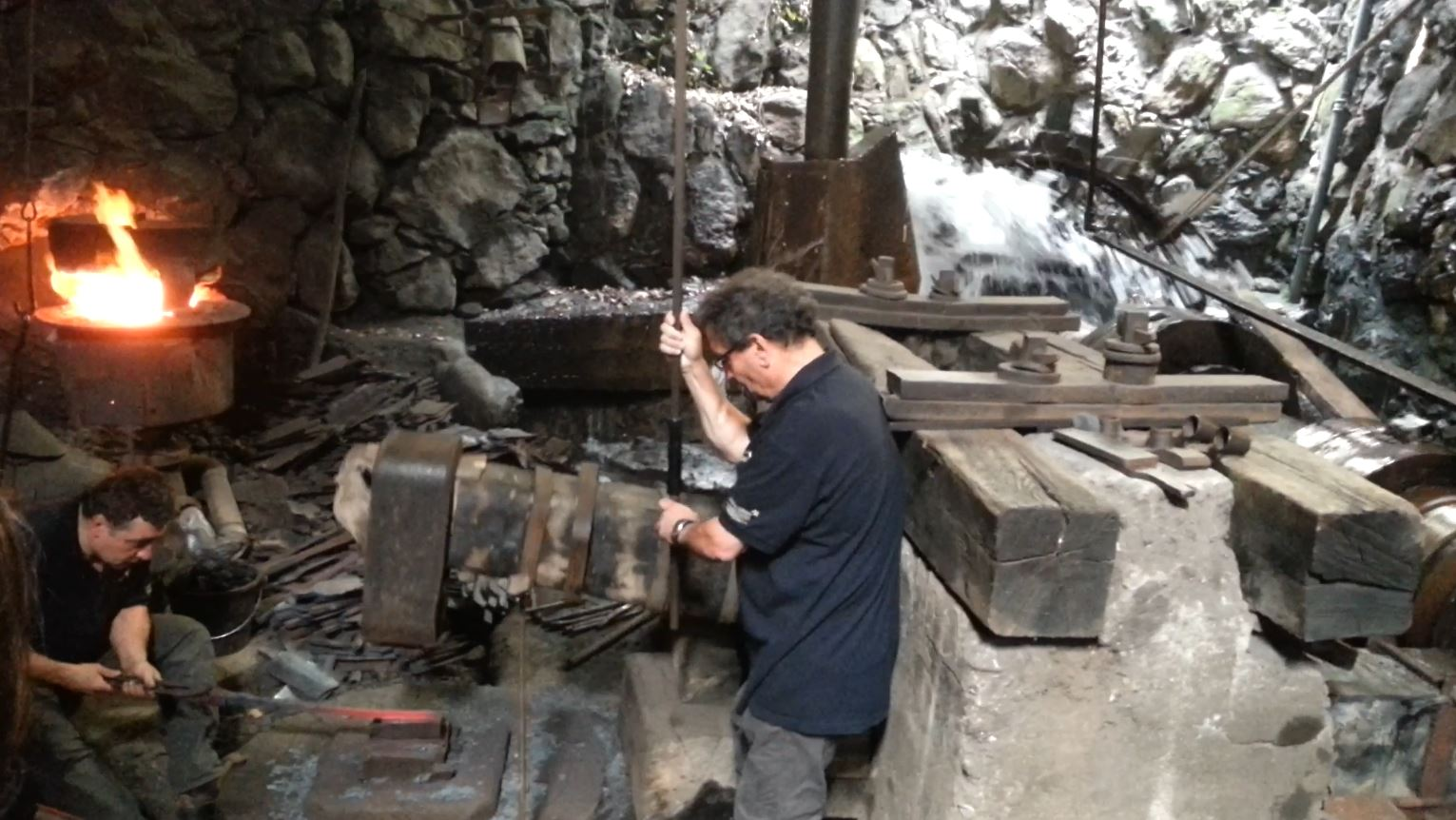
- A blacksmith at Montgaillard Forge
- Location of Montgailhard
- Location within France Location within Occitanie
- Coordinates: 42°56′07″N 1°38′07″E
- Country: France
- Region: Occitania
- Department: Ariège
- Arrondissement: Foix
- Canton: Foix
- Intercommunality: CA Pays Foix-Varilhes

Government
  - Mayor (2024–2026): Elisa Barbone
- Area^{1}: 7.93 km^{2} (3.06 sq mi)
- Elevation: 442 m (1,450 ft)
- Highest elevation: 941 m (3,087 ft)
- Lowest elevation: 394 m (1,293 ft)
- Population (2023): 1,437
  - Density: 181/km^{2} (469/sq mi)
- Time zone: UTC+01:00 (CET)
  - Summer (DST): UTC+02:00 (CEST)
- INSEE/Postal code: 09207 /09330
- ^{1} French Land Register data, which excludes lakes, ponds, glaciers > 1 km^{2} (0.386 sq mi or 247 acres) and river estuaries.

Montgailhard (French pronunciation: [mɔ̃ɡajaʁ]; Occitan: Montgalhard; before 2022: Montgaillard) is a commune in the Ariège department in southwestern France.

== Population ==
Historical population
Year	Pop.	±% p.a.
1968	1,265	—
1975	1,434	+1.81%
1982	1,378	−0.57%
1990	1,312	−0.61%
1999	1,320	+0.07%
2007	1,338	+0.17%
2012	1,401	+0.92%
2017	1,463	+0.87%
2023	1,437	−0.30%
Source: INSEE

== See also ==
- Communes of the Ariège department
- Aulos, Ariège
- Saint-Amans, Ariège
- Sem, Ariège
