= Saint-Jean-de-Verges =

Commune in Occitanie, France

- Commune
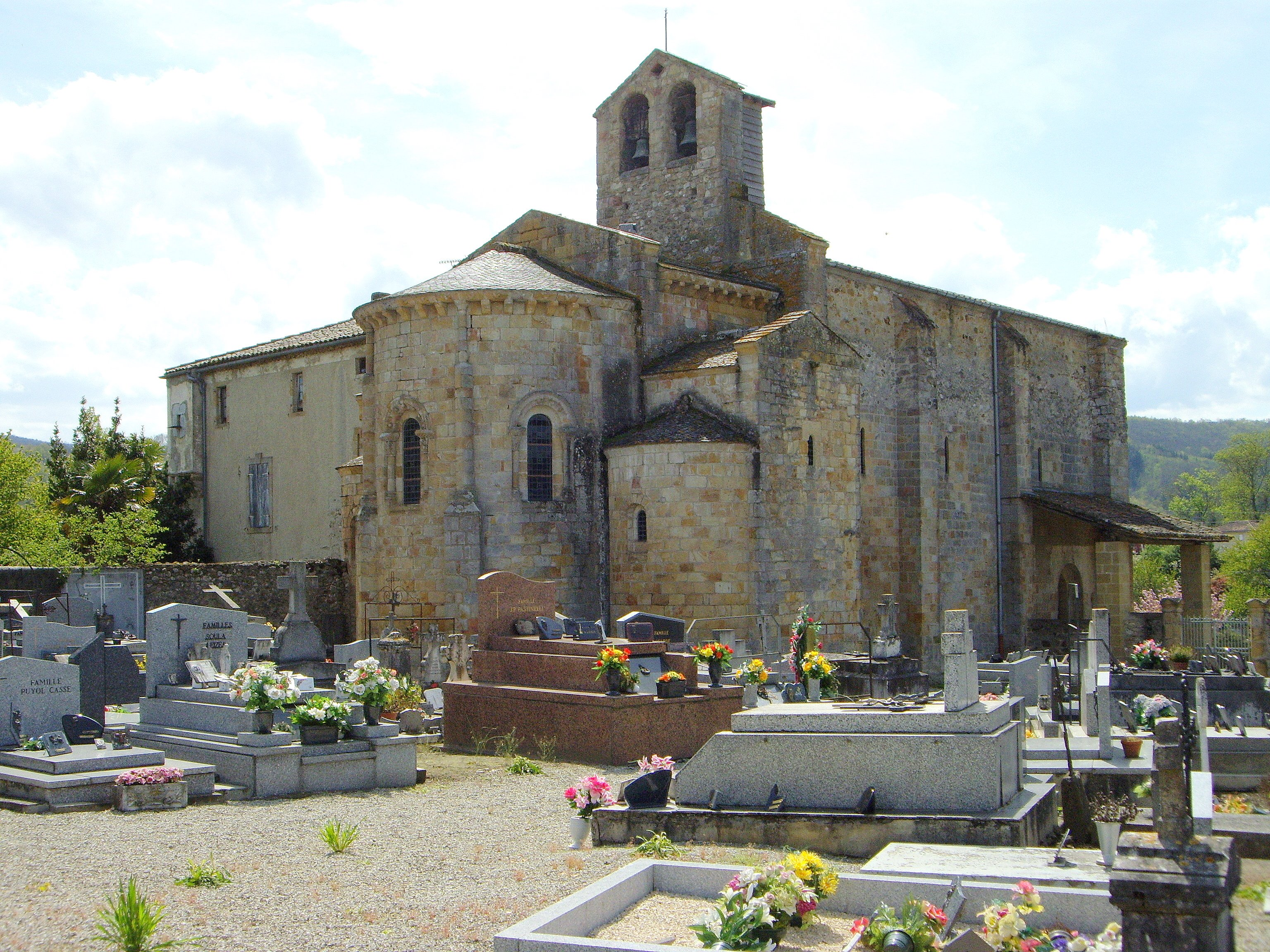
- The church in Saint-Jean-de-Verges
- Location of Saint-Jean-de-Verges
- Location within France Location within Occitanie
- Coordinates: 43°00′52″N 1°36′41″E
- Country: France
- Region: Occitania
- Department: Ariège
- Arrondissement: Foix
- Canton: Val d'Ariège
- Intercommunality: CA Pays Foix-Varilhes

Government
  - Mayor (2024–2026): Brigitte Fontaine
- Area^{1}: 12.73 km^{2} (4.92 sq mi)
- Elevation: 380 m (1,250 ft)
- Highest elevation: 709 m (2,326 ft)
- Lowest elevation: 335 m (1,099 ft)
- Population (2023): 1,290
  - Density: 101/km^{2} (262/sq mi)
- Time zone: UTC+01:00 (CET)
  - Summer (DST): UTC+02:00 (CEST)
- INSEE/Postal code: 09264 /09000
- ^{1} French Land Register data, which excludes lakes, ponds, glaciers > 1 km^{2} (0.386 sq mi or 247 acres) and river estuaries.

Saint-Jean-de-Verges (French pronunciation: [sɛ̃ ʒɑ̃ də vɛʁʒ]; Languedocien: Sent Joan de Verges) is a commune in the Ariège department in southwestern France. Saint-Jean-de-Verges station has rail connections to Toulouse, Foix and Latour-de-Carol.

== Population ==
Inhabitants of Saint-Jean-de-Verges are called Saint-Jeantains in French.

Historical population
Year	Pop.	±% p.a.
1968	488	—
1975	571	+2.27%
1982	635	+1.53%
1990	787	+2.72%
1999	841	+0.74%
2007	1,077	+3.14%
2012	1,161	+1.51%
2017	1,249	+1.47%
2023	1,290	+0.54%
Source: INSEE

== Notable people ==
- Logan Delaurier-Chaubet, footballer

== See also ==
- Communes of the Ariège department
