= Portet-Saint-Simon–Puigcerdà railway =

Railway line in France

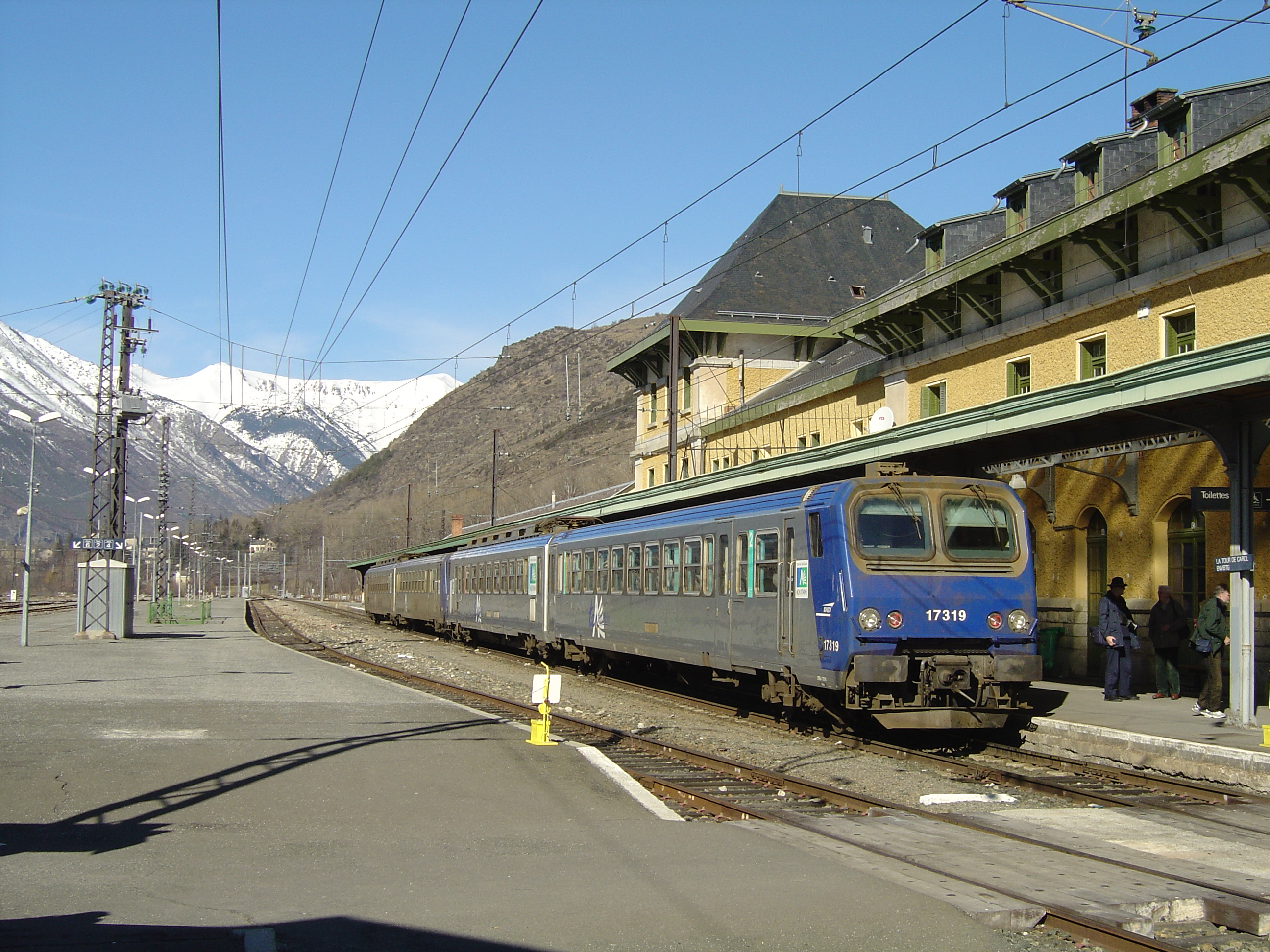
- Latour-de-Carol-Enveitg station

Overview
- Status: Operational
- Owner: RFF
- Locale: France (Occitania); Spain (Catalonia)
- Termini: Portet-Saint-Simon station; Puigcerdà railway station

Service
- System: SNCF
- Operator: SNCF

History
- Opened: 1861-1929

Technical
- Line length: 155 km (96 mi)
- Number of tracks: single track
- Track gauge: 1,435 mm (4 ft 8 1/2 in) standard gauge
- Electrification: 1.5 kV DC

The Portet-Saint-Simon - Puigcerdà railway is a secondary railway line in southwestern France. It connects Portet-sur-Garonne, 11 km south of Toulouse on the Toulouse–Bayonne railway, to Latour-de-Carol and Puigcerdà, towns located on each side of the French/Spanish border in Cerdanya. The railway was opened in several stages between 1861 and 1929.

Since the closure of the railway from Pau to Huesca via Canfranc in 1970, it is the only railway crossing the Pyrenees main chain. It is used daily by Corail Lunéa trains from Paris to Latour-de-Carol and Transport express régional, (TER) trains from Toulouse to Pamiers, Foix, Ax-les-Thermes and Latour-de-Carol. Most freight and long-distance passenger trains use either the Bordeaux–Irun railway around the western end of the Pyrenees, or the Narbonne–Portbou railway around the eastern end.

Today, SNCF service terminates at the French side of the border at Latour-de-Carol. The service between Latour-de-Carol and Puigcerdà and onwards to Barcelona is provided by Renfe for which the gauge is 1,668 mm (5 ft 5 21/32 in). The Renfe train from Latour-de-Carol connects directly with Barcelona but in July 2014 there are only five trains a day to Barcelona (and four from the city).

It is line RFN 672 000 of the French National Rail Network.

At most train stations along the route the altitude is engraved in a block of stone (sometimes specified: altitude du rail). These elevations are inaccurate now because the altitude system is now different (IGN-69).

One curiosity of this route is the spiral tunnel at Saillens.

Note that this line is a section of a railway between Toulouse and Barcelona requiring a change of train at Latour-de-Carol and a journey of 7:00hrs between the two cities, but it avoids, having to use the much more expensive trains such as the AVE (via Perpignan, a route not requiring any changes).

A full price ticket costs €30 full price via Latour de Carol compared to between €65 and €90 by TGV or Talgo (May 2011 prices) via Narbonne and / or Figueras.

== History ==
The railway was built by the Compagnie des Chemins de fer du Midi. The first section that was opened in 1861 led from Toulouse to Pamiers. The line was extended to Foix in 1862. The line was extended from Foix to Tarascon-sur-Ariège in 1877, and further to Ax-les-Thermes in 1888. Finally in 1929 the section from Ax-les-Thermes to Puigcerdà was opened.

== Rolling Stock ==
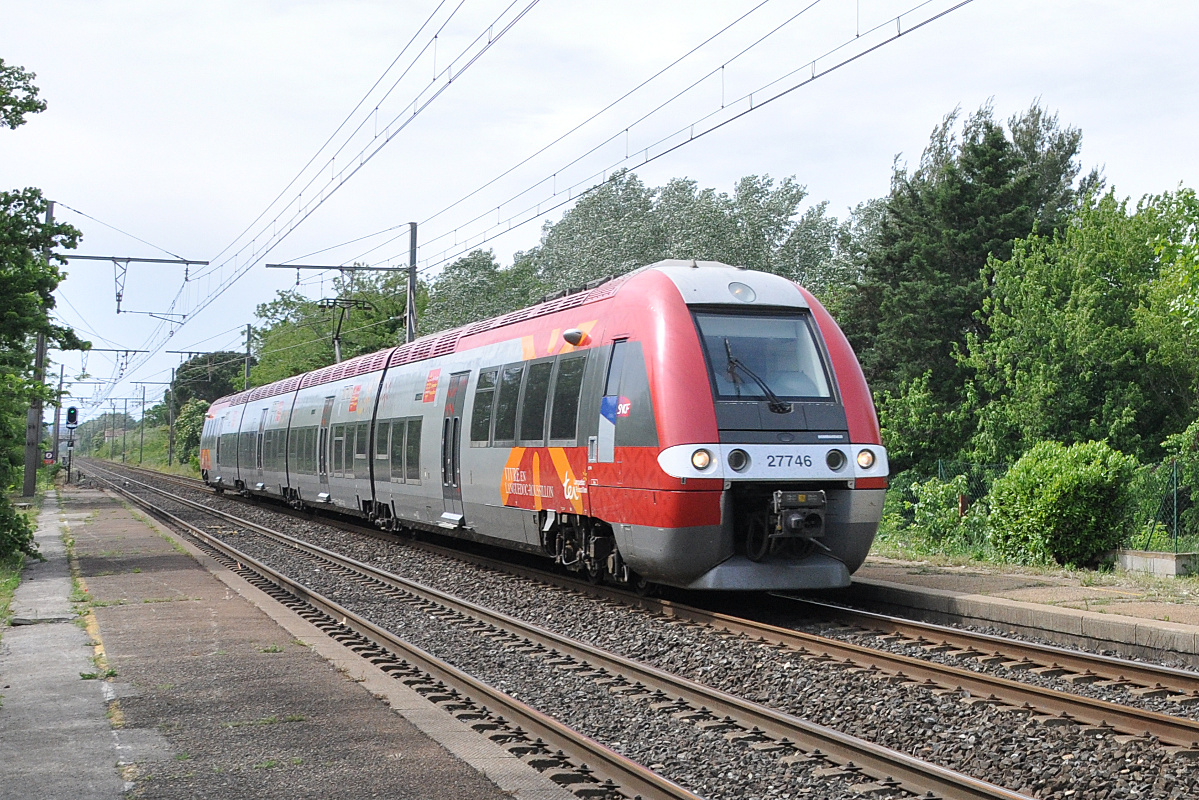
TER train model Z 27500.

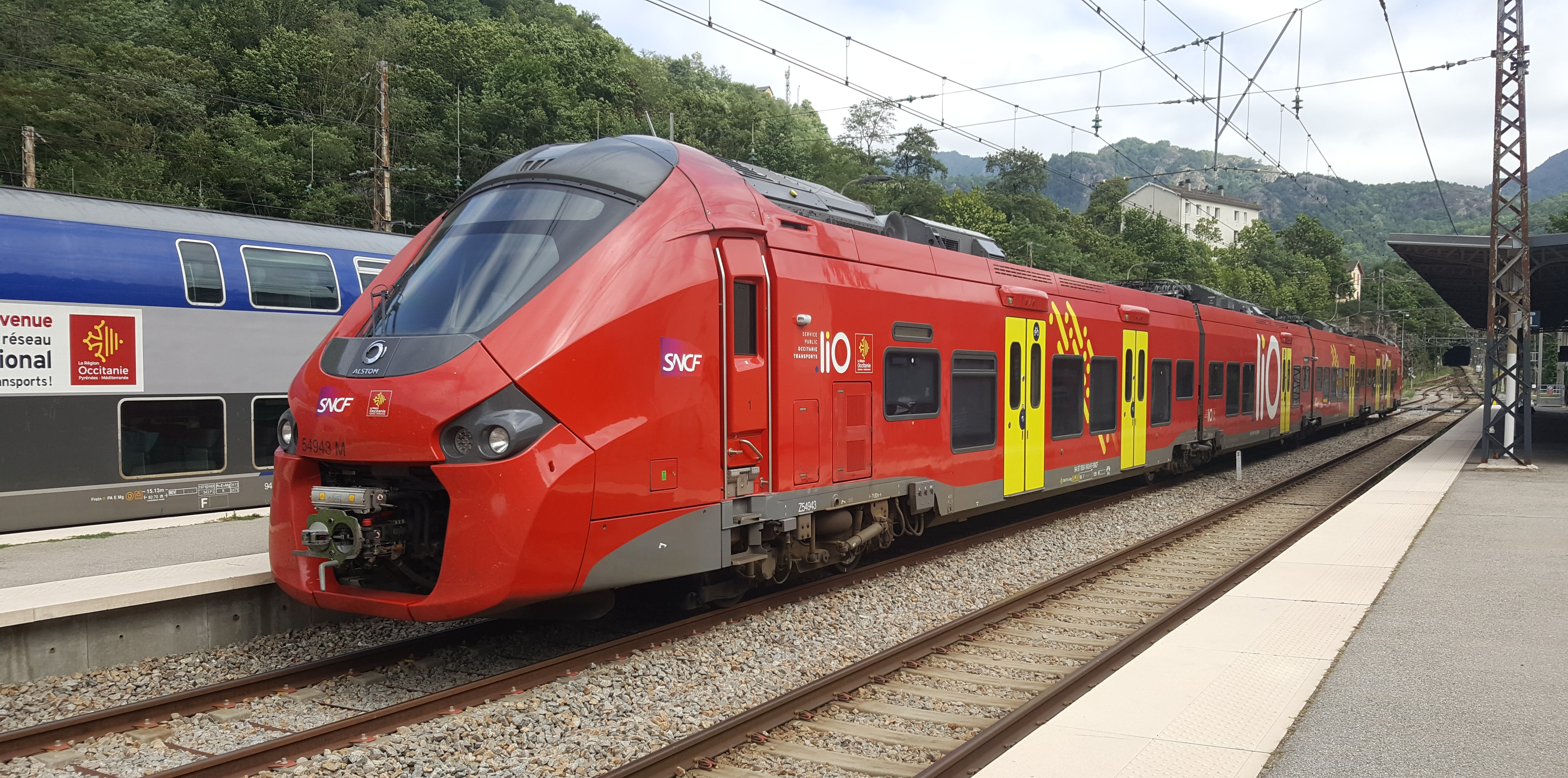
Regiolis (Z 54900) at Ax-les-Thermes.

TER connections were previously operated by electric multiple units trains model SNCF Class Z 27500. These had themselves replaced, during the 2000s, the SNCF Class Z 7300.

From 2017 onwards, the Régiolis and Regio 2N railcars gradually replaced these ageing models. Since 2020, the AGCs have therefore only been used as stand-ins.

The Z 54900 Regiolis trains run as far as Latour-de-Carol, whilst the Regio 2N and B 83500 Regiolis trains are limited to Ax-les-Thermes.

== See also ==
- List of highest railways in Europe
