= Latour-de-Carol–Enveitg station =

Railway station in Enveitg, France

Latour-de-Carol–Enveitg
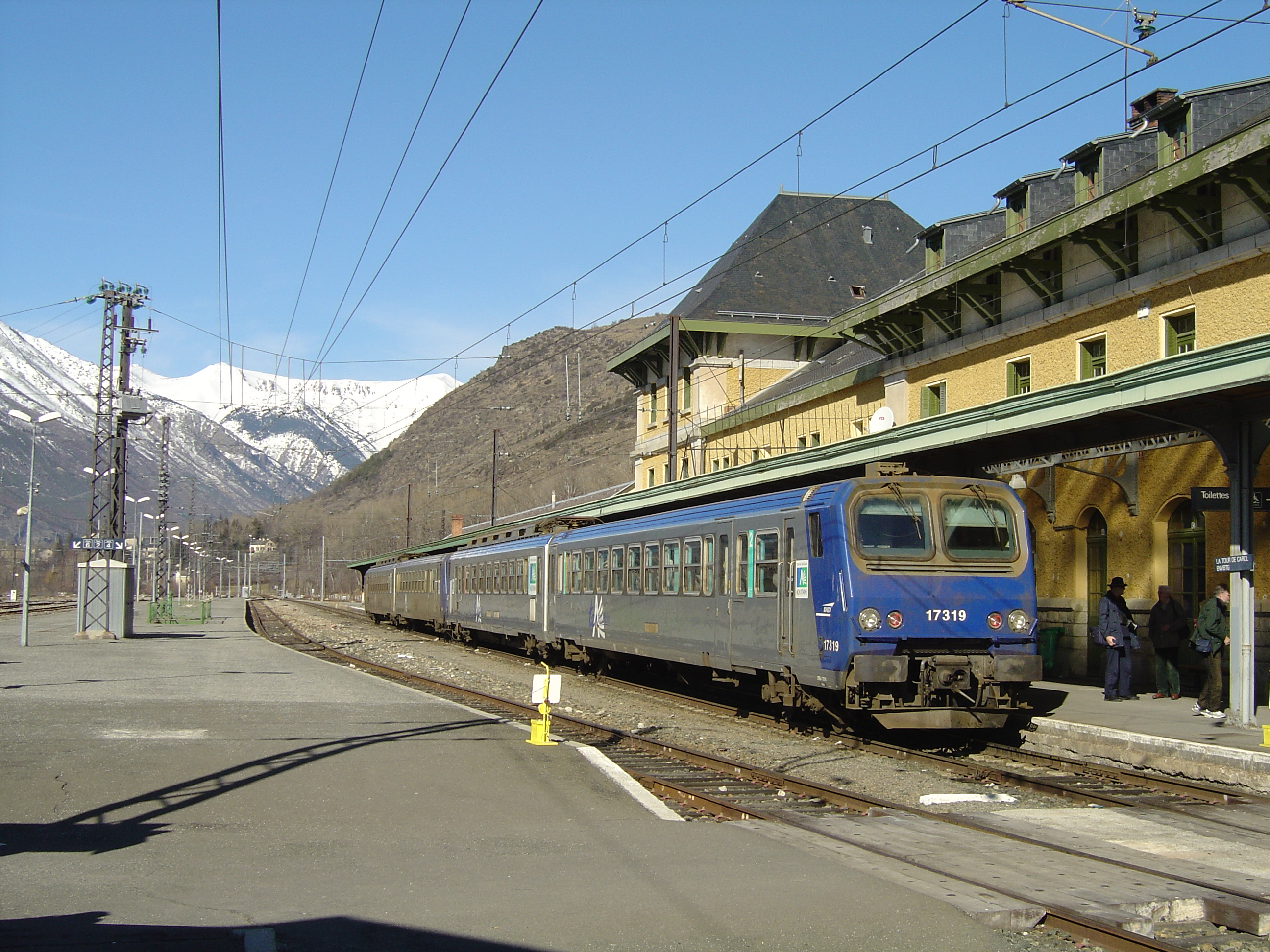
- Latour-de-Carol railway station

General information
- Location: Enveitg, Pyrénées-Orientales, Occitanie, France
- Coordinates: 42°27′31″N 1°54′22″E
- Lines: Portet-Saint-Simon–Puigcerdà railway Ligne de Cerdagne; Montcada i Reixac–Puigcerdà
- Platforms: 4
- Tracks: 11

Other information
- Station code: 87611483

Services
Preceding station	SNCF	Following station
Porté-Puymorens towards Paris-Austerlitz	Intercités (night)	Terminus
Preceding station	TER Occitanie	Following station
Porté-Puymorens towards Toulouse	11	Terminus
Terminus	32 (Ligne de Cerdagne)	Béna Fanès towards Villefranche–Vernet-les-Bains
Preceding station	Rodalies de Catalunya	Following station
Puigcerdà towards L'Hospitalet de Llobregat	R3	Terminus
Location

Latour-de-Carol–Enveitg (Catalan: La Tor de Querol–Enveig) or Latour-de-Carol is a railway station in Enveitg and Latour-de-Carol, Occitanie, France. It is the current terminus of three lines.

France's SNCF operates TER (regional) services on the Portet-Saint-Simon–Puigcerdà railway (from Toulouse-Matabiau) and on the Ligne de Cerdagne known as Train Jaune (from Villefranche-de-Conflent, with connections to Perpignan). Spain's Renfe Operadora runs Rodalies de Catalunya trains from L'Hospitalet de Llobregat on the Barcelona commuter rail line R3. SNCF also runs Intercités de Nuit night trains to Paris.

Latour-de-Carol is one of the few stations in the world with three different gauges. Others include Montreux railway station, Hendaye station and Jenbach railway station, Madrid Atocha station (when the metro is included), Powell Street and Embarcadero stations in San Francisco, and several stations in Tokyo, mostly on the Toei Shinjuku Line. The line to Toulouse-Matabiau is 1,435 mm (4 ft 8 1/2 in) standard gauge; the line to Barcelona is 1,668 mm (5 ft 5 21/32 in) Iberian gauge; and the Cerdagne line to Villefranche-de-Conflent is 1,000 mm (3 ft 3 3/8 in) metre gauge. The three lines each have a different voltage supply: 1500 V DC (overhead France), 3000 V DC (overhead Spain), and 850 V DC (3rd Rail, Ligne de Cerdagne), respectively.

Platform 1 also features the longest covered platform in France.

Services from Latour-de-Carol are to Toulouse, Barcelona and Villefranche-de-Conflent where one can change for Perpignan.

== Gallery ==
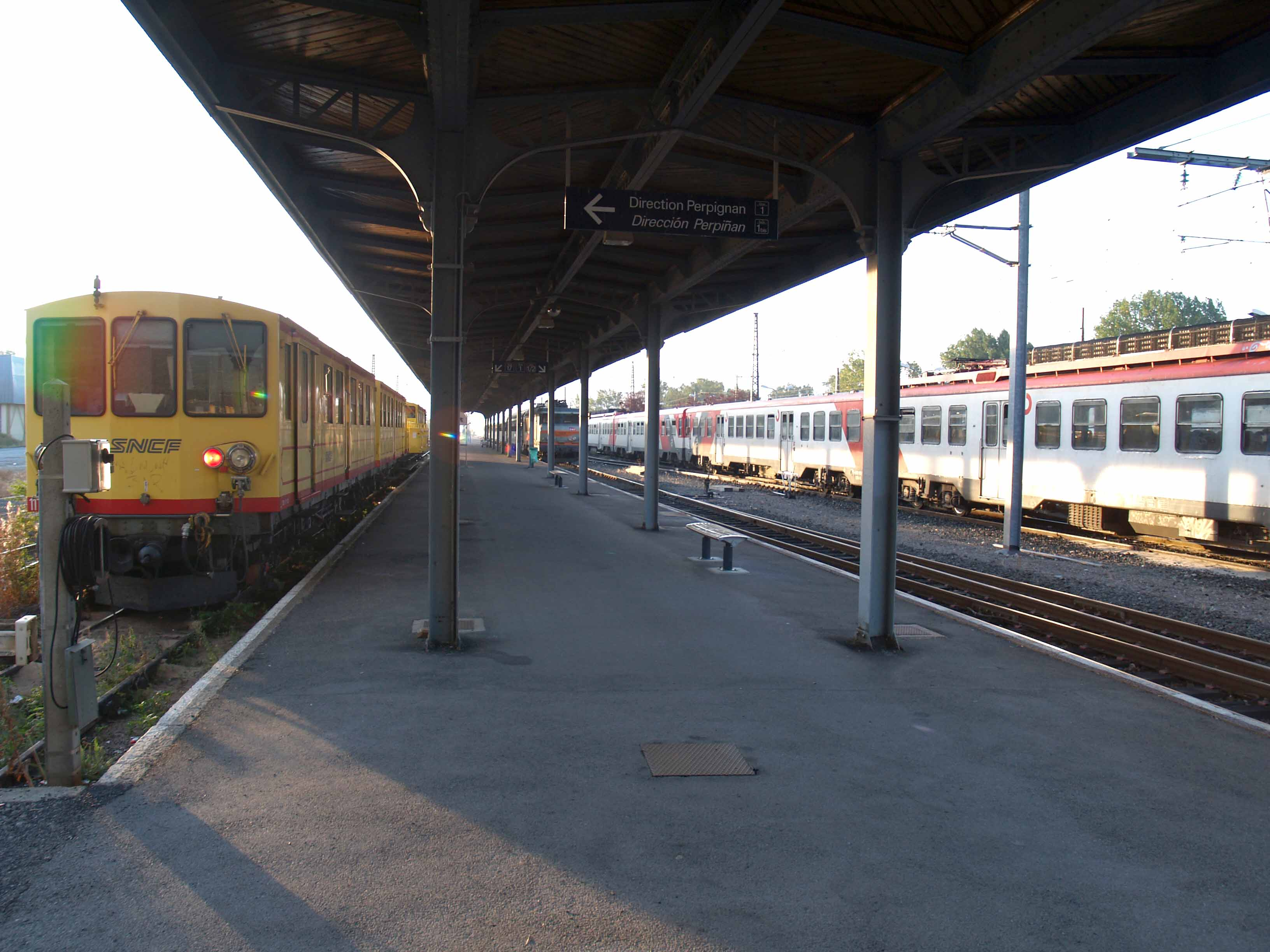
The station showing the 3 different gauges

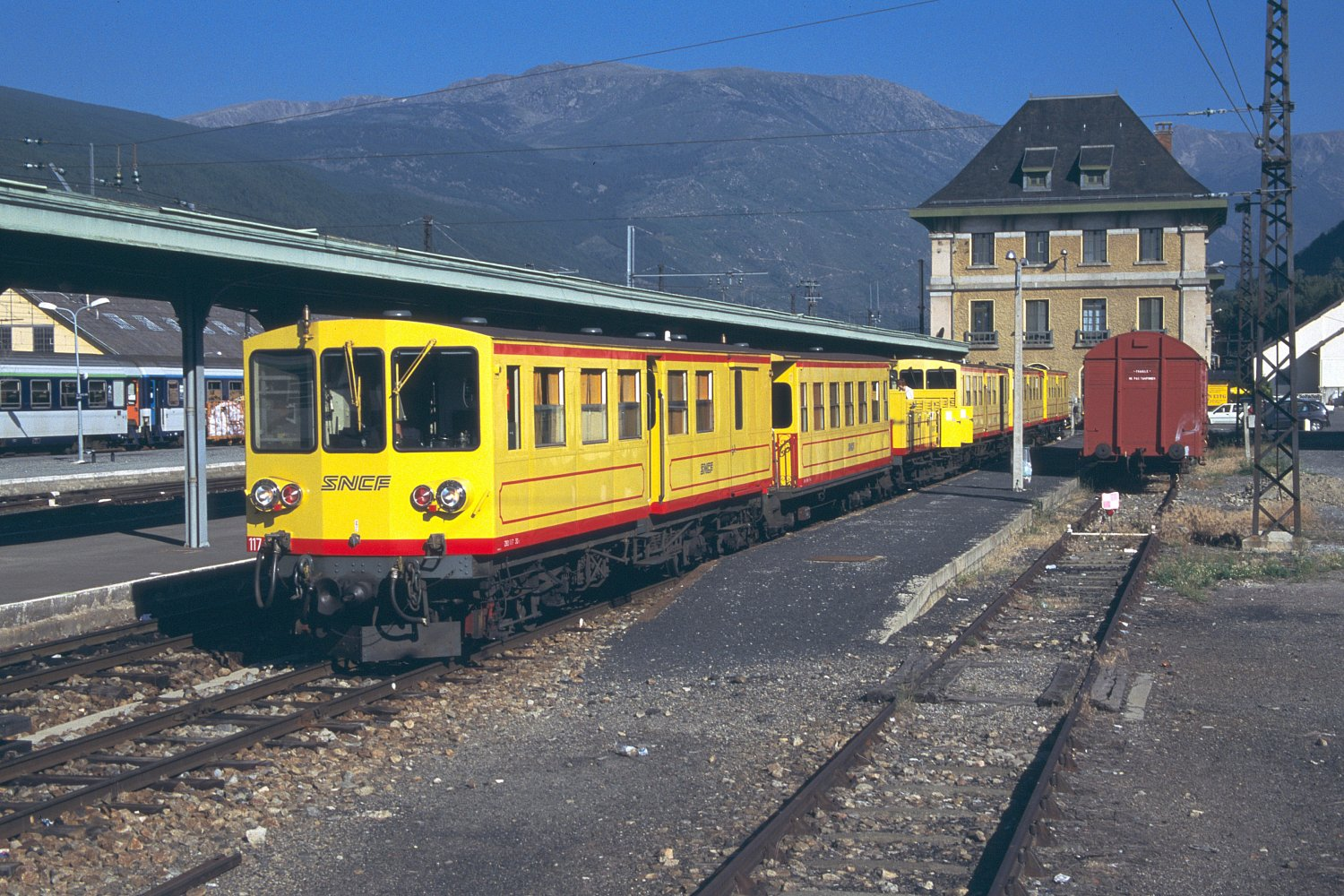
A Z 100 unit for the Cerdagne line at Latour-de-Carol

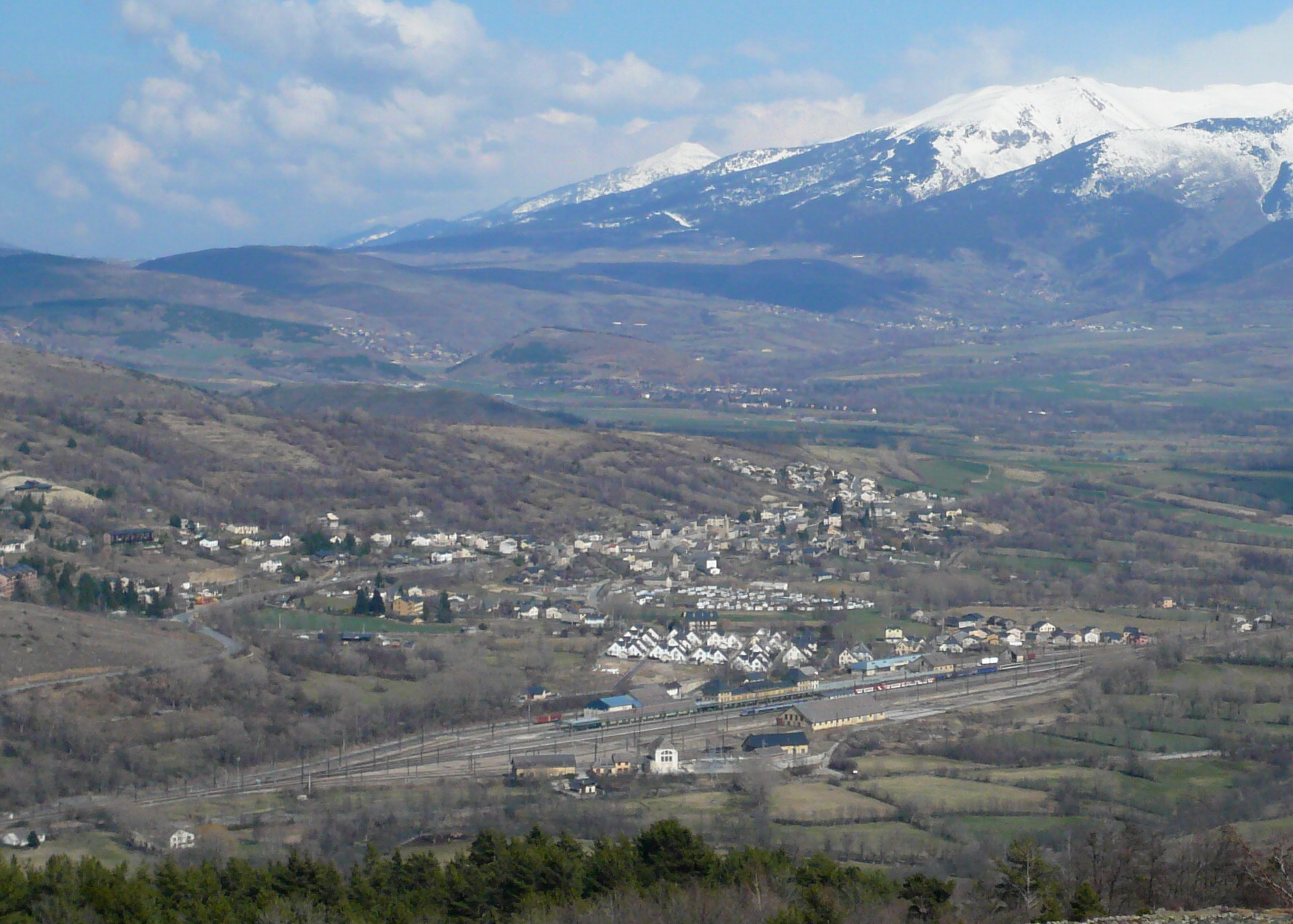
The station in the foreground

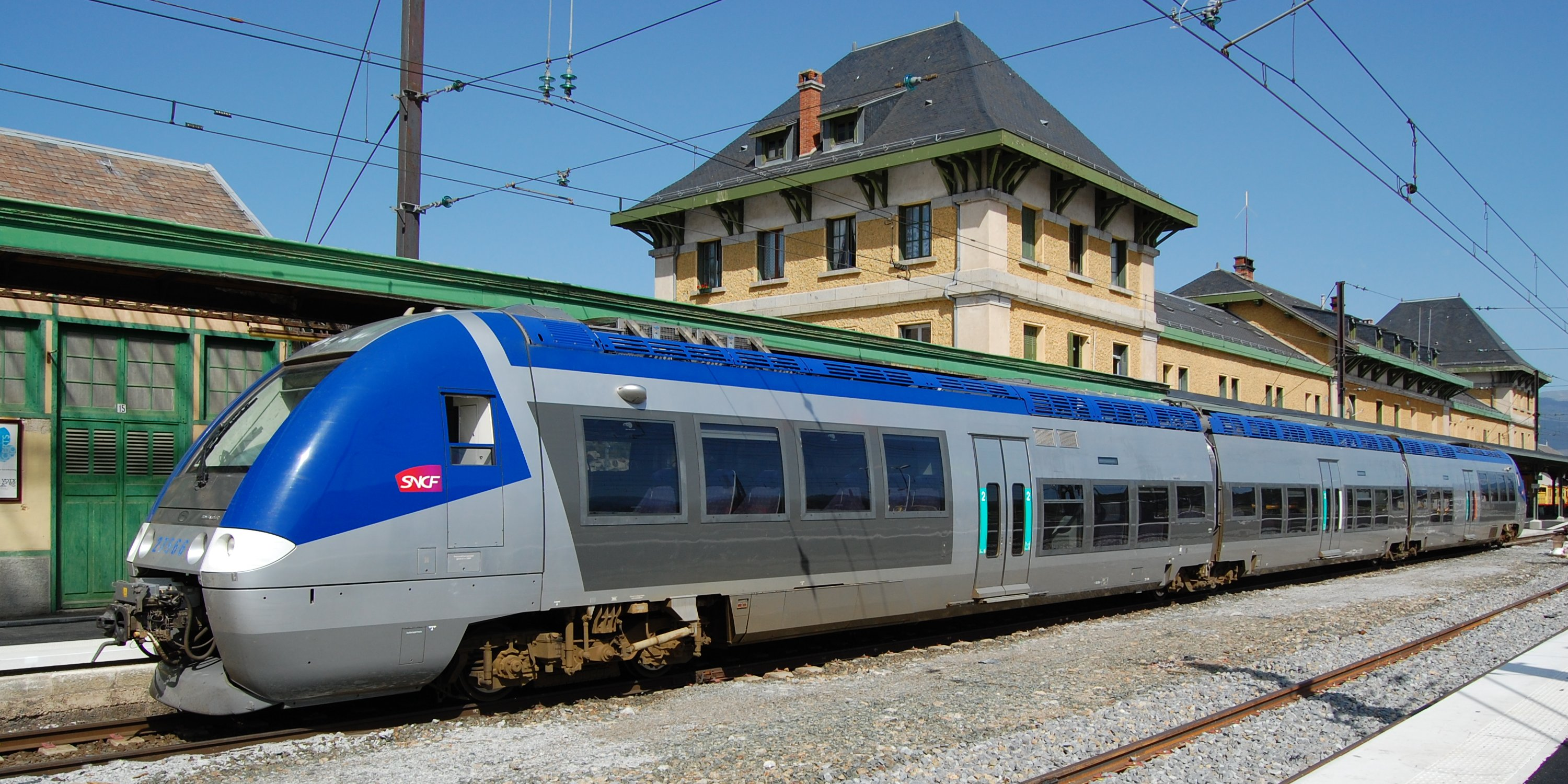
A B81500 at Latour-de-Carol on the service to Toulouse
