= Transport in Andorra =

Andorra is a landlocked country in Europe, which lies between France and Spain, whose transport infrastructure is primarily road provision.

== Railways ==
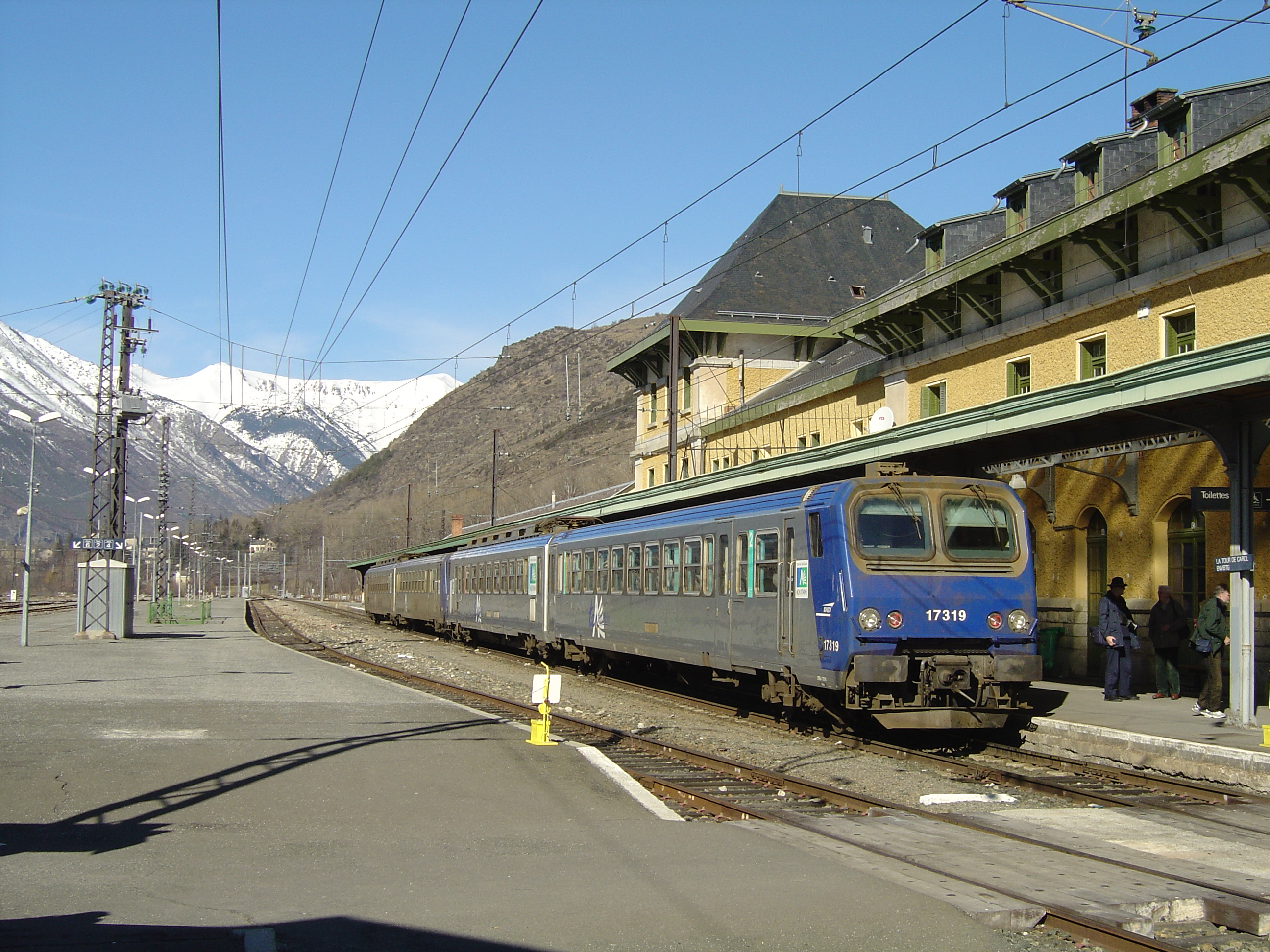
A train at Latour-de-Carol, one of the two stations serving Andorra

Andorra has no railways, and never had, although the line connecting Latour-de-Carol and Toulouse, which in turn connects to France's TGVs at Toulouse, runs within 2 kilometres (1.2 mi) of the Andorran border. One station in France is connected by bus to Andorra la Vella — L'Hospitalet-près-l'Andorre (served by the SNCF). A bus service used to run to Latour-de-Carol, served by both SNCF's line to Toulouse and Spain's (Renfe's) line to Barcelona.

A new public transport system, "Metro Aeri", was proposed by the government in 2004, but has not been built. It would have been an elevated cable metro system that would glide above the city's river.

== Roads ==
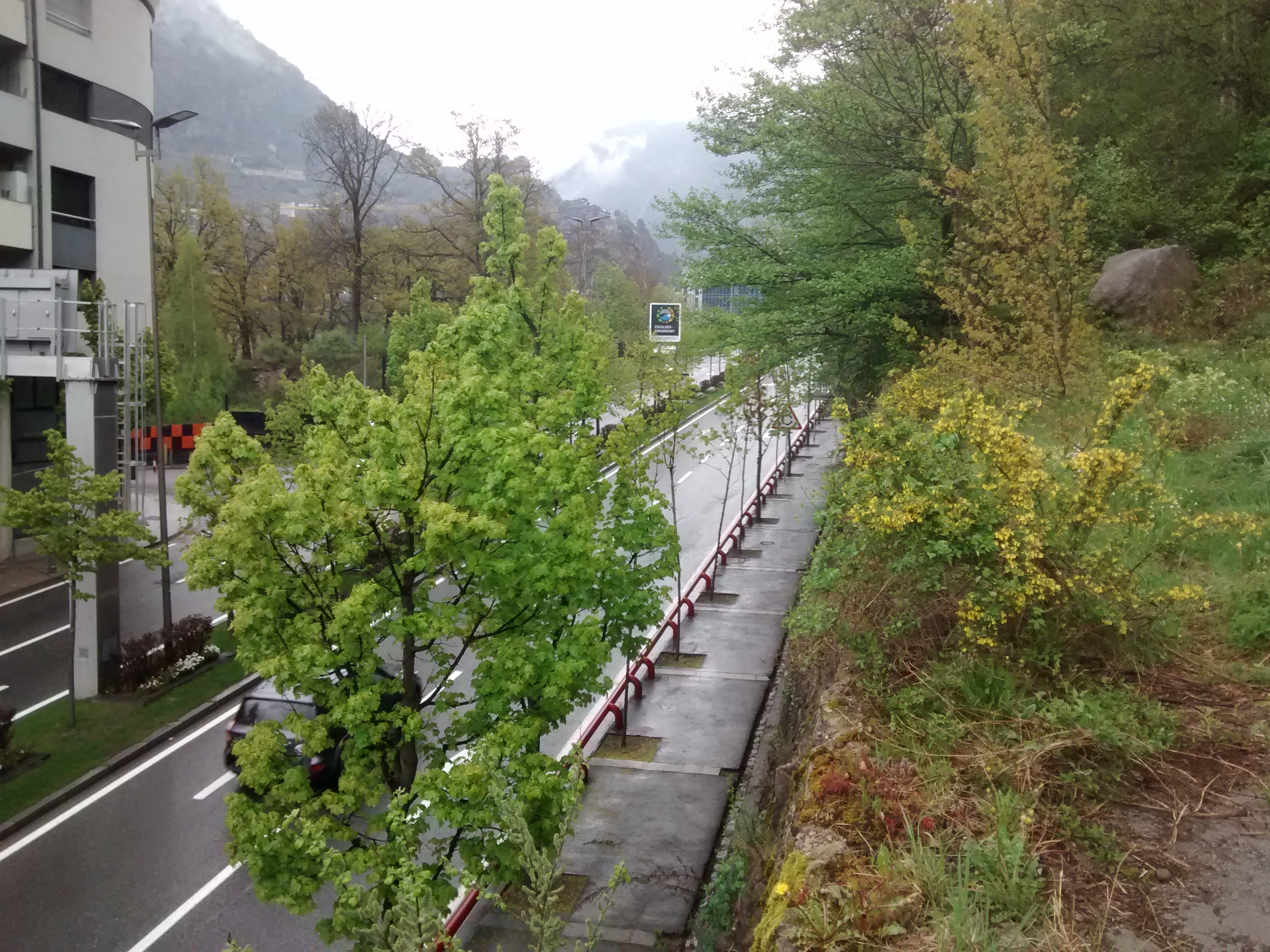
CG-2, a major road in Andorra

Andorra has a network of roads, with a total length of 269 km (167 mi), of which 198 km (123 mi) are paved, leaving 71 km (44 mi) of unpaved road. The main road to the north (France) goes through the Envalira pass, which is 2,409 metres (7,904 ft) high but nevertheless open all year round as it has a tunnel as well. The two main roads out of Andorra la Vella are the CG-1 to the Spanish border, and the CG-2 to the French border via the Envalira Tunnel near Pas de la Casa. In winter, the main roads in Andorra are usually quickly cleared of snow and remain accessible, but the main road out of Andorra on the French side (RN-20 on the French side and CG-2 on the Andorran side) is less frequently cleared and is sometimes closed by avalanches. Other main roads out of Andorra la Vella are the CG-3 and CG-4 to Arcalis and Pal, respectively.

Bus services cover all metropolitan areas and many rural communities, with services on most major routes running half-hourly or more frequently during peak travel times. There are frequent long-distance bus services from Andorra to Barcelona and Barcelona Airport, and also to Toulouse and Toulouse Airport, in each case taking approximately 3 hours. Bus routes also serve Girona Airport and Portugal via Lleida. Bus services are mostly run by private companies, but some local ones are operated by the government. The private bus companies are Autocars Nadal, Camino Bus, Cooperativa Interurbana Andorrana, Eurolines, Hispano Andorrana, and Novatel.

== Airways ==
There are no airports for fixed-wing aircraft within Andorra's borders but there are, however, heliports in La Massana (Camí Heliport), Arinsal and Escaldes–Engordany with commercial helicopter services.

Nearby airports located in Spain and France provide access to international flights for the Principality. There is an airport located in the neighbouring Catalan comarca of Alt Urgell, 12 km south of the Andorran-Spanish border, named Andorra–La Seu d'Urgell Airport. Starting July 2015 it has operated commercial flights to Madrid and Palma de Mallorca, and as of September 2022 flight are operated to Madrid by Iberia Regional.

The nearest other airports are at Perpignan, France (156 km from Andorra) and Lleida, Spain (160 km from Andorra). The largest nearby airports are at Toulouse, France (165 km from Andorra) and Barcelona, Spain (215 km from Andorra). There are hourly bus services from both the Barcelona and Toulouse airports to Andorra.

== See also ==
- Transport in France
- Transport in Spain
- Visa policy of Andorra
