= Route nationale 22 =

Road in France

The Route nationale 22 (RN22) is a highway in southern France, connecting l'Hospitalet-près-l'Andorre to Pas de la Casa in the Principality of Andorra. On the French side of the border at Pas de la Casa, the RN22 also connects to the Envalira Tunnel (Catalan: Túnel d'Envalira), which is an alternative route into Andorra avoiding the Envalira Pass (Catalan: Port d'Envalira).

The road is a branch of the N20, and runs parallel to the RN320 which crosses Col de Puymorens. The roads follow the same route for a few kilometers.

This road has only been called the RN22 since 1975 when there was a general downgrading of the road network, before which it was called the NR20b. Formerly, RN22 was a section of the current trunk road N11 between Mauzé-sur-le-Mignon with the La Rochelle and a section in La Rochelle to the Port de la Pallice and the landing stage of the ferry to the L'île de Ré.

In winter, avalanches sometimes close the continuation of the road below Col de Puymorens — the N20.
