= Mérens horse =

Breed of horse

Mérens
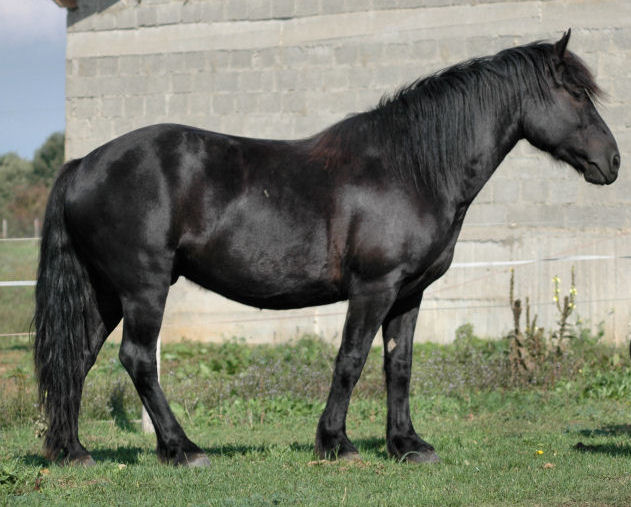

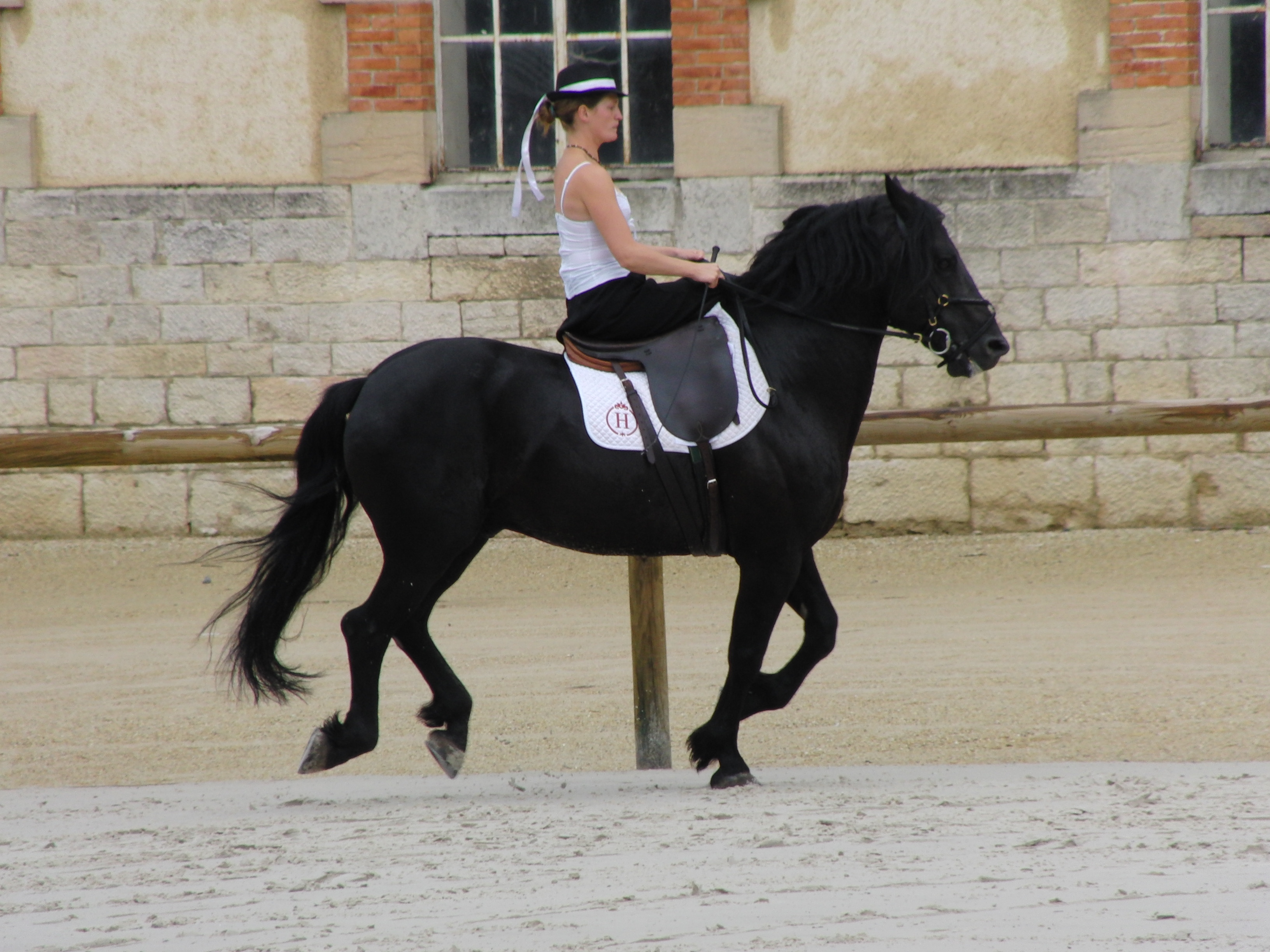
- Other names: Ariégeois pony, Cheval de Mérens
- Country of origin: France (Ariège), Spain (Ariégeois mountains)

Breed standards
- Haras Nationaux

The Mérens, Cheval de Mérens or Caballo de Merens (French pronunciation: [meʁɛ̃s]), still occasionally referred to by the older name of Ariégeois pony, is a small, rustic horse native to the Pyrenees and Ariégeois mountains of southern France, where the river Ariège flows, and northern Spain, near Andorra. Two general types, a small, light traditional mountain horse and a taller, sportier modern type, are found. Always black in color, Mérens must meet strict physical standards in order to be registered in the stud book. The breed is known for its sure-footedness on mountain terrain, as well as for its endurance, hardiness and docility. The French breed registry organizes regional offices, and partners with other national organizations in Europe to preserve and promote the breed. The organization enforces rigorous selection of breeding stock, with a goal of increasing quality in the breed. In the past, the Mérens was used for farm work, draft work and as pack horses. Today it is mainly used as a saddle horse, although some members of the breed have been successful in carriage driving. Many Mérens are taken on an annual transhumance (seasonal migration), in which they are moved higher in the mountains during the summer and into the valleys for the winter. An old practice, it fell into disfavor, but has recently re-emerged.

Thought to have originated in prehistoric times, the exact early history of the Mérens remains a mystery. Theories on its origins include descent from Iberian horses, similar to many regional mountain horses, or possibly Oriental horses brought to the area by settlers from the east. Small black horses from the area of Ariège have been recorded as early as the time of Julius Caesar, as well as being associated with Charlemagne. They pulled artillery for Napoleon's Grand Army, as well as being used by farmers, dock workers, miners and smugglers moving goods through the Pyrenees mountains. They were frequently seen at local horse fairs, and were used to breed mules in a cross with Catalan donkeys. By the end of the 19th century, they had gained a reputation as light cavalry horses. At the same time, however, uncontrolled crossbreeding led to a decline in the purebred population, and in 1908 the local agricultural society was put in charge of the breed. The breed registry was created in 1933, and in 1948 the first stud book was created under the control of the French National Stud.

In the second half of the 20th century, the population sharply declined, as mechanization transferred work in cavalry and agriculture to machines. By the 1970s, the Mérens was on the verge of extinction, with only 40 horses registered in the stud book. The breed was saved by members of the hippie movement, who re-settled in the Ariège mountains, boosting the local economy and restarting breeding programs. The Mérens also benefited from a new surge in popularity in riding horses, and between 1975 and 1985 its population rebounded, leading the breeding program to be considered an example for the conservation of rare breeds. The herd size remains relatively small, however, and one genetic study considers the traditional type of the breed to be endangered and recommends that efforts should be focused on its preservation.

== Naming ==
The Mérens was traditionally bred in the village of Mérens-les-Vals in the department of Ariège. The French National Stud calls the breed the "Mérens", a name which was officially mentioned for the first time in 1866. Laetitia Bataille, a French horse breeding specialist, considers the use of "Mérens" incorrect, and prefers the names "Ariégeois", "Cheval de Mérens" or "Mérengais". Jean-Louis Savignol, a traditionalist breeder, prefers the name "Méringais", saying that "Mérens" refers to the village and the valley in which it is located, not the horse breed.

== Characteristics ==
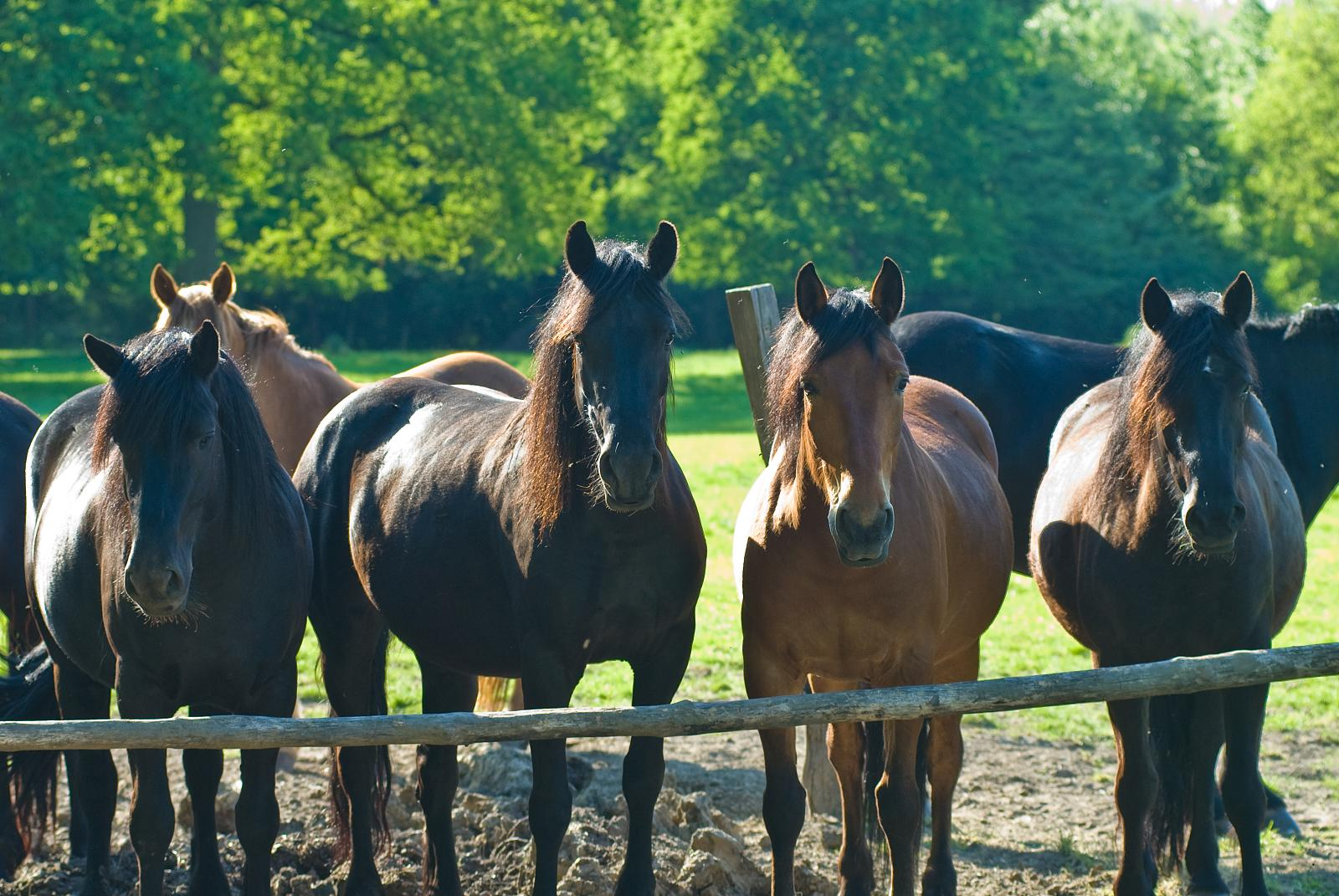
Mérens horses

The traditional Mérens is a small, light horse, well adapted to the mountains, while modern Mérens are increasingly more sporting in style. The breed is known for its elegance, and in 2005 was ranked as one of the 23 most beautiful horse breeds by the French magazine Cheval Pratique. Since 1948, Mérens horses must meet certain physical standards in order to be admitted to the stud book. In this time, the admission criteria have changed several times. Currently, the general appearance of a Mérens is strong and compact, with energetic movement. The Mérens, like many mountain horses, is calm, docile and hardworking. The report of a comprehensive study on the heritability of the breed's temperament was published in Equ'idée in 2010. It is a versatile breed, and very hardy, able to live all year outside without suffering from the weather. Mérens are known for their endurance, agility and sure-footedness. They require very little care, and can survive on poor food, even when working. They are resistant to cold, but react poorly to heat. Mérens foals are often born in the snow, without human intervention, but are usually handled and accustomed to humans from an early age. They show increased resistance to the anticoagulant properties of some varieties of fern, the consumption of which can cause bloody sweats and blood in the urine in other horses.

The breed standard for the Mérens gives an ideal height of 14.1 to 15.1 hands (57 to 61 inches, 145 to 155 cm) and a weight of 400 to 500 kilograms (880 to 1,100 lb). The desired size for stallions is 14.2^{1}/_{2} hands (58.5 inches, 149 cm) and 14.1 hands for mares. Horses smaller than 14.2 hands (58 inches, 147 cm) can be considered ponies for some equestrian competitions. Horses bred in the valleys and plains are larger than those bred in the mountains; the latter average around 12.3^{1}/_{2} hands (51.5 inches, 131 cm). The coat is always black, but may have a reddish cast during the winter. Foals may be born black, silver-grey or coffee-colored, but become black as they grow. Dappling on the body is desirable.

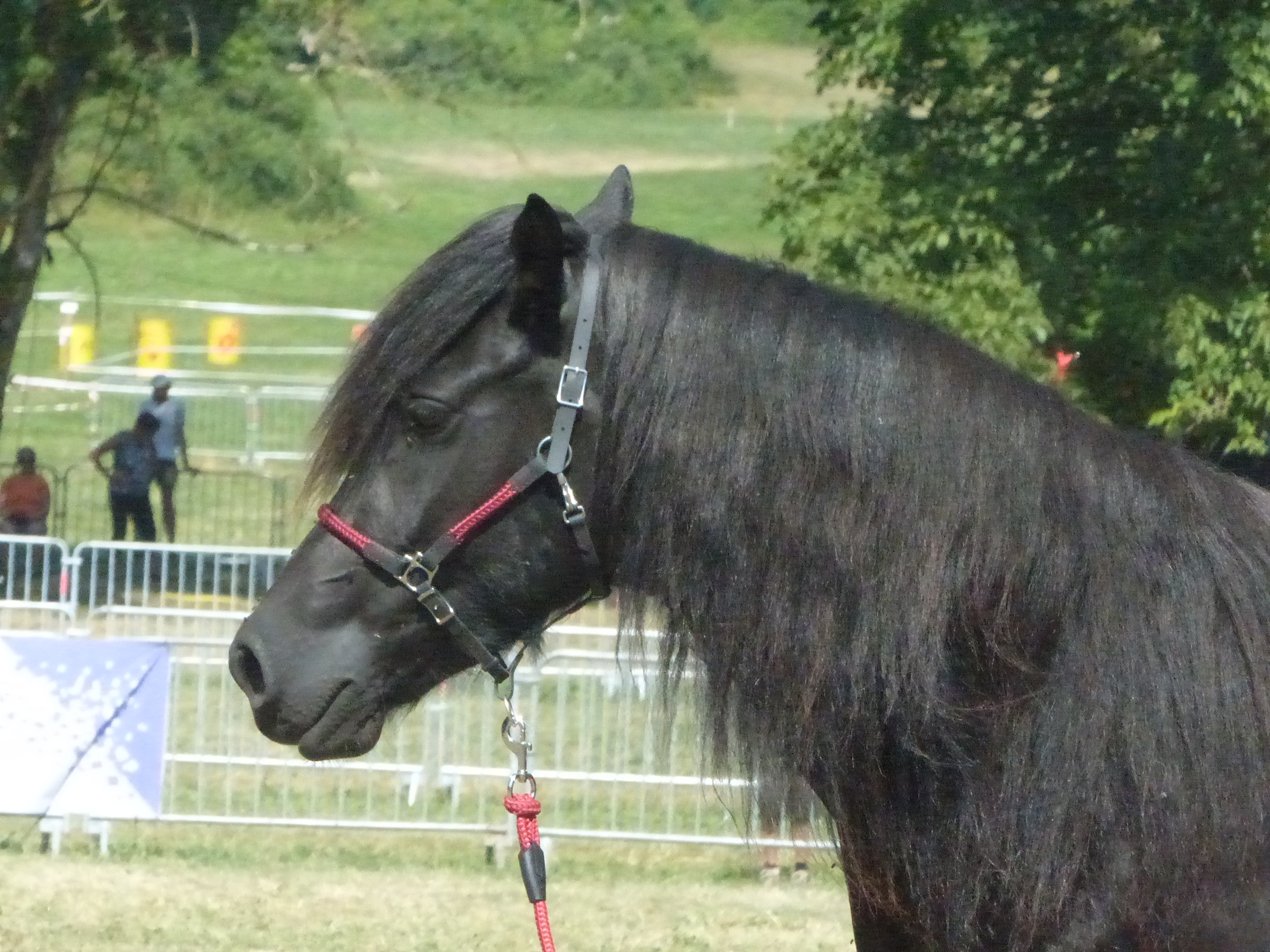
The head and neck of a Mérens

The head has a straight or slightly concave facial profile, a flat forehead, and wide, short ears. A distinguishing characteristic of the breed is a "beard" of hair growing below the cheeks. Small white markings are allowed on the face, but never on the legs. The neck is of medium length in the modern Mérens, and often shorter and broader in the traditional version. The shoulders are sloping and moderately long, and the chest wide and deep. Pronounced withers are favored in those Mérens used for pack horses, but as with most mountain horses, many traditional Mérens have wide, flat withers. The girth is deep. The back is generally shorter in modern Mérens than in the traditional version, where horses with long, strong backs were preferred for use as pack horses. The croup is well-muscled and the tail low-set. The legs are strong and solid, with well-defined joints. They tend to be quite short, and some have hocks set too close together, a recurrent fault in mountain horses. The feet are large and well-formed, allowing the horses to go without shoes. There is little feathering on the lower legs.

== Registration ==
In France, the breed is organized by SHERPA (Syndicat hippique des éleveurs de la race pyrénéenne ariégeoise/Union of Horse Breeders of the Ariège Pyrenees) in La Bastide-de-Sérou, which has about 400 members and 600 horses in the stud book. SHERPA unites eleven regional offices whose purpose is to organize Mérens breeders and enthusiasts. The role of SHERPA is to decide the overall direction of the breed in partnership with the French National Stud. It promotes the Mérens at fairs, national shows and international exhibitions, as well as publishing newsletters and breeder lists. SHERPA also organizes the annual breed show in Bouan.

Only purebred Mérens may be registered in the breed stud book. The selection of stallions is rigorous, based on tests at the age of three. The breeding goal is to produce horses with the ideal conformation and good character. The gaits are subject to particular observation in all stallions, and during the three-year-old inspections, they must perform a dressage test, a cross-country jumping test, a test on the longe line and a physical inspection. The Mérens has one of the most stringent inspection procedures, and breeders aim to achieve a steady increase in the quality of the breed. Mares are evaluated during a breed competition organized by the French National Stud.

French breeding of the Mérens is divided between two schools of thought. The first is traditional breeders seeking to preserve the original type, that of a light draft horse living high in the mountains year-round and retaining the hardiness for which the breed is known. The second comes from the conversion of the Mérens to a leisure horse in the 1980s, and aims to transform the physical type of the breed into a more sports-oriented horse to ensure the survival of the breed. This dichotomy has become a source of tension between farmers and users of the breed.

Several countries besides France have populations of Mérens, and a few have breed registries and stud books that are recognized by the French. In Italy, the Mérens is the only foreign breed among the "breeds of limited distribution" recognised by the AIA, the national breeders' association. Mérens are found mostly in northwestern Italy, in the provinces of Cuneo and Turin, but has spread to other mountain regions such as the valleys of Bergamo and Trento. The Italian breed registry for the Mérens is based in Cuneo. A Belgian non-profit organization has been organizing the breed in that country since June 2005, and was recognized as an official stud book by the Belgian Ministry of Agriculture in August 2006. An agreement has been signed with the French breed registry to recognize the Belgian stud book as a daughter organization. Mérens are also present in the Netherlands, Switzerland and Germany, where there are recognized stud books and active breeding populations. There are some Mérens in the Czech Republic and members of the breed have also been exported to India and Tunisia.

== Transhumance ==
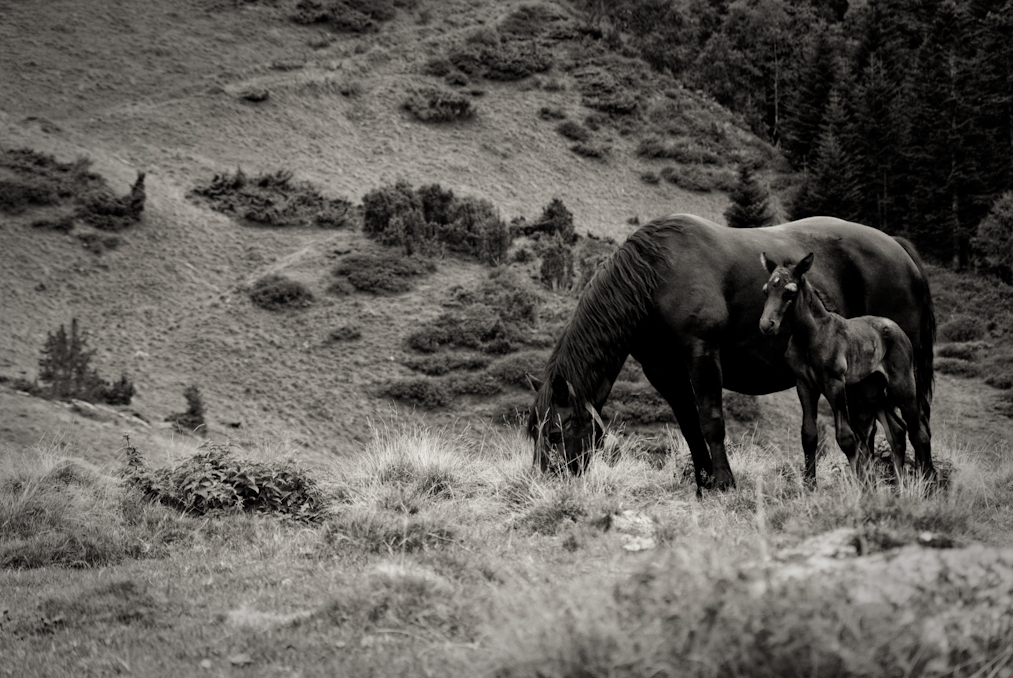
A mare and foal grazing in their mountain homeland

The department of Ariège is known for the annual transhumance (seasonal migration) of cattle, sheep and horses, including many members of the Mérens breed. Each year, in June, hundreds of horses are moved to summer pastures at around 1,500 metres (4,900 ft) in altitude, where they live in a semi-feral state, traveling on steep mountain paths and weathering storms and other climatic variations. In October, they return to the valleys for the winter. An old tradition, the transhumance fell out of favor, but has been reintroduced to Ariège by the association Autrefois en Couserans. Since 2000, the association has worked with local horse breeders to promote the return to the annual practice. Around 500 Mérens make the transhumance each year. Herds are usually led by an experienced mare marked with a bell, as is done with cattle. A stallion can accompany the mares with foals to maintain cohesion of the herd and prevent it from mixing with other herds on the mountain slopes. The behavior of transhumant herds is midway between that of feral horses and domesticated horses who are around humans year-round. Some horses, raised high in the mountains, stay there year-round and do not perform the transhumance.

== History ==
The history of the Mérens is closely linked to its homeland in the Pyrenees, as evidenced by the many myths and legends in which it plays a role. The origins of the Mérens are very old, and are commonly said to be lost in the mists of time. It is native to the upper valley of Ariège, near Andorra. The direct ancestor of the Mérens was probably in this valley during the Quaternary Period, approximately 15,000 years ago. These wild horses probably moved to the mountains to escape global warming that accompanied the end of the last glacial period.

The physical characteristics of the Mérens are the result of the harsh mountain environment where they live, and they are reminiscent of the horses in the cave drawings at Niaux, made some 13,000 years ago. These images depict animals with dense coats and a skull shaped like the modern Mérens, with a beard-like protrusion of hair under the jawbone.

The Mérens may be of Iberian origin, as are most breeds from the area of the Pyrenees. It resembles the Norwegian Dole Gudbrandsdal and the British Fell and Dales ponies. Unlike the latter, the Mérens has never been crossed with the Friesian horse. Another theory of origin for the Mérens is based on the straight or concave facial profile (which distinguishes them from the convex-profiled Iberian horses), and asserts that they are descended from Oriental horses brought to Ariège by settlers from the east. With the isolation of their mountain homeland, the Mérens has undergone very little intermingling with foreign breeds.

=== Antiquity and Middle Ages ===
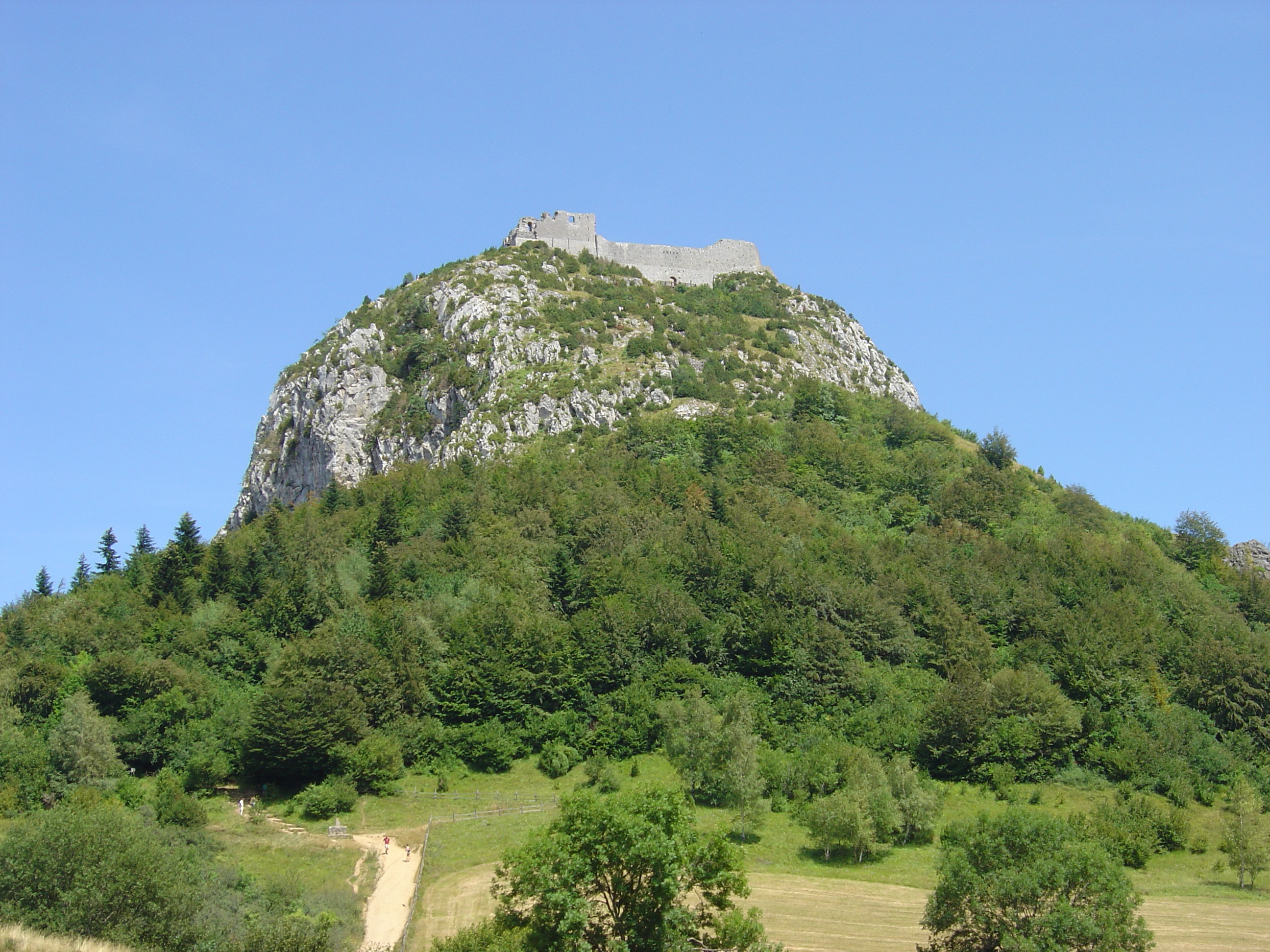
A view of the fortress of Château de Montségur

Julius Caesar mentions small black horses that resemble the Mérens in his Commentarii de Bello Gallico (Commentaries on the Gallic War), when discussing the defeat of Crassus by the Sotiates and their cavalry. Historian Paul Prunet was the first to link the animals discussed by Caesar to the Mérens, although the relationship has not been definitely established. The location of the Sotiates is the subject of controversy, with some authors placing them in the district of Nerac and others near Foix. The Mérens may have been used as a pack animal by the Romans, who may have taken some of the animals with them when they left. The small black horse from the Pyrenees is described throughout antiquity.

There are also several mentions of what may be Mérens during the Middle Ages. They have been associated with Charlemagne, and a Carolingian statue showing Charlemagne on a small horse has been examined, and shown that the animal resembles a Mérens, standing no more than 13.3 hands (55 inches, 140 cm) at the shoulder. The legend of the founding of L'Hospitalet-près-l'Andorre depicts a traveler who, exhausted by the cold, kills his horse and buries himself in the steaming bowels, swearing that he will build a small hospital in the place if he survives.

The local Cathars held a special place in their religion for horses, especially through their belief in the transmigration of souls. There was also a belief in Pamiers that knights took their horses with them when they died. In the 12th century, the Cathar princess Esclarmonde of Foix climbed to the fortress of Château de Montségur on the back of a small, sure-footed black horse. In the 14th century, the same small black horses are mentioned as accompanying the armies of Gaston III, Count of Foix.

=== 18th and 19th centuries ===
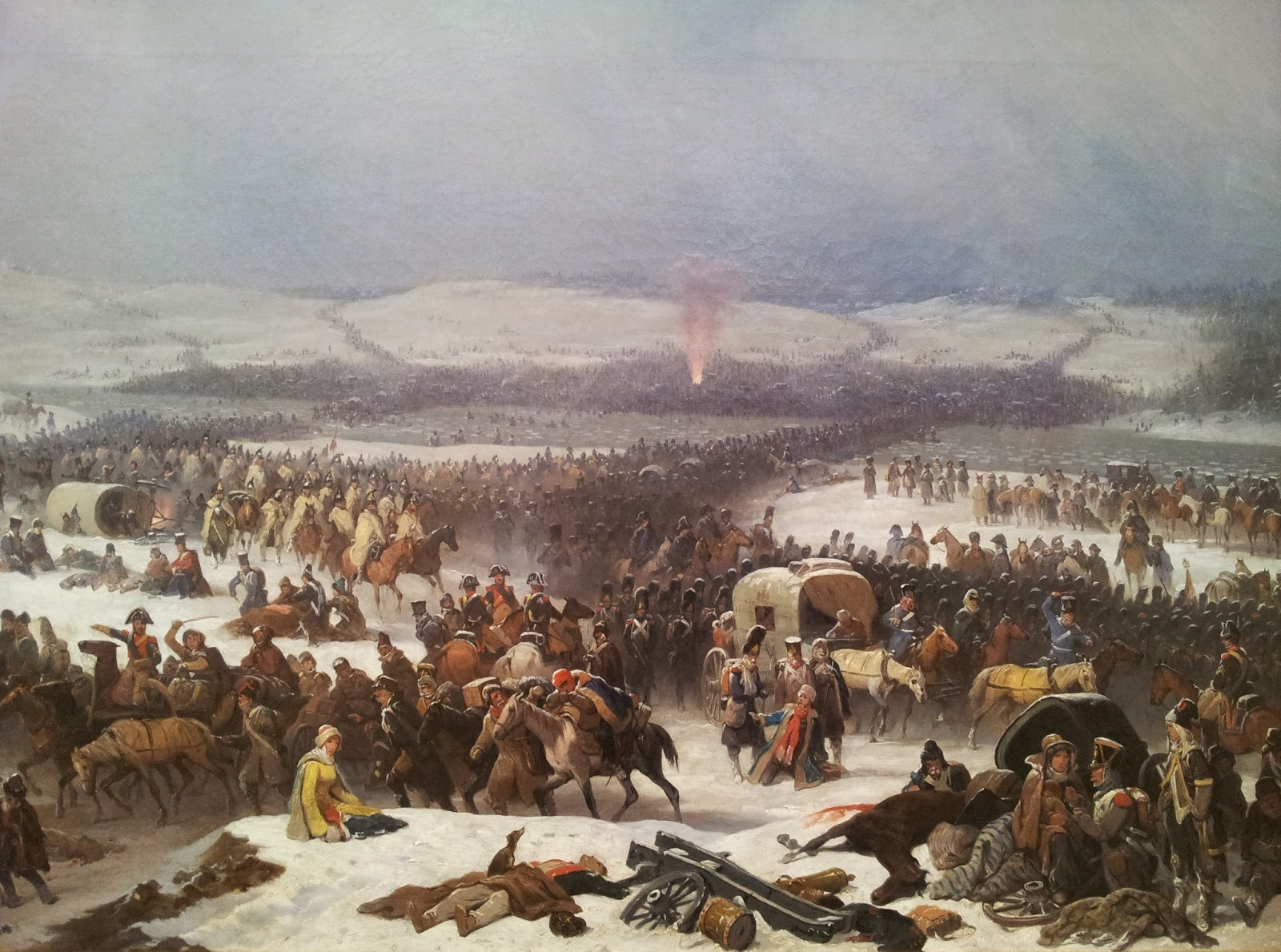
A painting of Napoleon's crossing of the Berezina, showing the many horses used by the army

Horses from Ariège were requisitioned for Napoleon's Grand Army during his Russian campaign. They were used mainly to pull artillery, as were most horses of this type from French territory at the beginning of the 19th century. A popular legend has them becoming famous during the crossing of the Berezina River during the Battle of Berezina.

The Mérens has long been used as a delivery and courier horse, as well as being used by local farmers. It has also been used by the winemakers of Languedoc, gardeners and dock workers, as well as continuing to be used by French armies, who appreciated its endurance. The breed was used in the mines, both under saddle and in harness. It was used by smugglers moving goods through the mountains between France and Spain, mainly carrying wood and minerals, and was known for its endurance and sense of direction.

Mérens horses were sold at the Tarascon-sur-Ariège horse fair, and were popular with merchants from the large cities. The breed was sometimes called "Tarasconnais", after the town, and was famous for the high quality of its legs and the ability to survive on poor food. It was used to breed mules, and the Pyrenees mule was derived from a cross between Catalan donkeys and horses of the Breton, Mérens and other breeds. Before World War I, almost 1,000 Pyrenees mules were born annually in the Ariège department. The first breed show was organized in 1872. By the end of the 19th century, horses from the Pyrenees were known for their use as light cavalry. They were praised for their agility, sure-footedness, robust constitutions, and endurance, a result of their semi-feral existence in the Pyrenees mountains.

=== 20th century ===
Starting the late 19th century, uncontrolled crossbreeding created a decline in the population of purebred Mérens. By the early 20th century, some breeders in L'Hospitalet and Mérens-les-Vals began to work against these crossings with outside breeds and bred only horses with conformation similar to the original Mérens. These breeders wanted to keep alive the traditional Mérens, which they valued for its hardiness and versatility. In 1908, control of breeding was given to the President of the Société d’Agriculture de l’Ariège (Agricultural Society of Ariège ), Gabriel Lamarque, who was dedicated to the preservation of the breed. In 1933, the Syndicat d'élevage du Mérens (Breeding Society of Mérens) was created, and in 1948 the first stud book was created under the control of the French National Stud.

In 1946, the French army ceased to use the Mérens for drawing artillery in the mountains, and this corresponded to the beginning of the decline of the breed. The population fell dramatically during the second half of the 20th century, due to the modernization and mechanization of transport and agriculture. In 1950 in Senegal, the Mérens was used in attempts to create a horse tougher than the native M'Bayar, but the breeding program was not enough to significantly increase the Mérens population. The use of the Mérens in agriculture continued into the 1970s, and like many French draft breeds, it was also bred for slaughter to produce horse meat. The mountains of Ariège acted as a sanctuary, preventing the Mérens, as well as other breeds such as Gascon cattle and Tarasconnaise sheep, from disappearing completely. By the early 1970s, however, the Mérens was on the verge of extinction.

By the early 1970s, there remained only 40 Mérens horses registered in the breed studbook. The breed was saved from extinction by utopian communities believing in an ecological apocalypse. As part of the hippie movement, people wanting to live on the fringe of society settled in the small villages of Ariège. They boosted the local economy, including encouraging the resumption of the breeding of Mérens. At the same time, the story of the semi-feral horse Bonbon became a local phenomenon. This Mérens, orphaned following an accident, was raised on bottle-fed goat milk. He was then sold to a horse-dealer before later returning to his homeland and winning prizes as a stallion. He died at twenty, having returned to his herd high in the mountains.

Meanwhile, the Mérens breed was revived as a fashionable animal of leisure by Lucien Lafont de Sentenac, a national expert in horse breeding. He moved the efforts of farmers towards breeding sport pony-style animals, and the breed, originally called the "Mérens horse", was renamed the "Mérens pony" for commercial and administrative reasons. With good breeding management and promotion, the population numbers of the breed gradually recovered. Between 1975 and 1985, the number of Mérens doubled from 2,000 to 4,000 animals, and its rescue is considered a good example of saving an endangered breed.

In 1977, the Mérens was introduced to the island of Réunion, where its breeding is now part of the local economy. It is used as a saddle horse and for hauling. The breed is also used for equestrian tourism on the mountains of the island, where it is particularly well suited for the steep terrain and climate, taking tourists into volcanic regions covered in ash.

A national center for the breeding of Mérens was open in 1990 by SHERPA to offer support for the preservation of the breed. The equestrian center includes a living museum for the presentation of the breed. In 1997, SHERPA offered a Mérens to then-Prime Minister of Britain Tony Blair. On January 1, 1998, the Mérens was removed from the classification of "pony" and returned to the category of "horse" by the French National Stud. In 2000, the Mérens breed was chosen by Jean-Louis Savignol to launch the first breeding farm for certified organic horses intended for leisure use rather than human consumption. The horses are fed a natural diet, dewormed with a mixture of garlic and clay, treated using a combination of homeopathy and osteopathy, and moved high into the mountains during the transhumance each year.

=== Present ===
Today, Mérens closest to the original type and lifestyle are found in the valleys of the high mountains of the Pyrenees, near Andorra. The majority of Mérens breeding still takes place in Ariège, the traditional homeland of the breed. However, they can also be found in almost all regions of France, including the Alps, the Cévennes, the Centre, the Massif Central and the Île-de-France. Besides the annual breed show in Bouan, Mérens are also commonly seen at the Paris International Agricultural Show and other major horse shows.

The total herd size is relatively small. The population numbers stabilized somewhat at the beginning of the 21st century, with around 1500 broodmares, 150 active stallions and 500 births per year. In 2006, 455 new foals were registered, 1,051 mares and 89 stallions were listed as active breeding stock and there were 306 breeders, a term applied to anyone who has at least one active broodmare. In the same year, the Mérens made up 2 percent of total horses in France. A genetic study in 2008 considers the original type of the breed to be endangered. The author suggested that the Mérens should be a conservation priority in order to maintain the maximum genetic diversity among French horse breeds.

== Uses ==
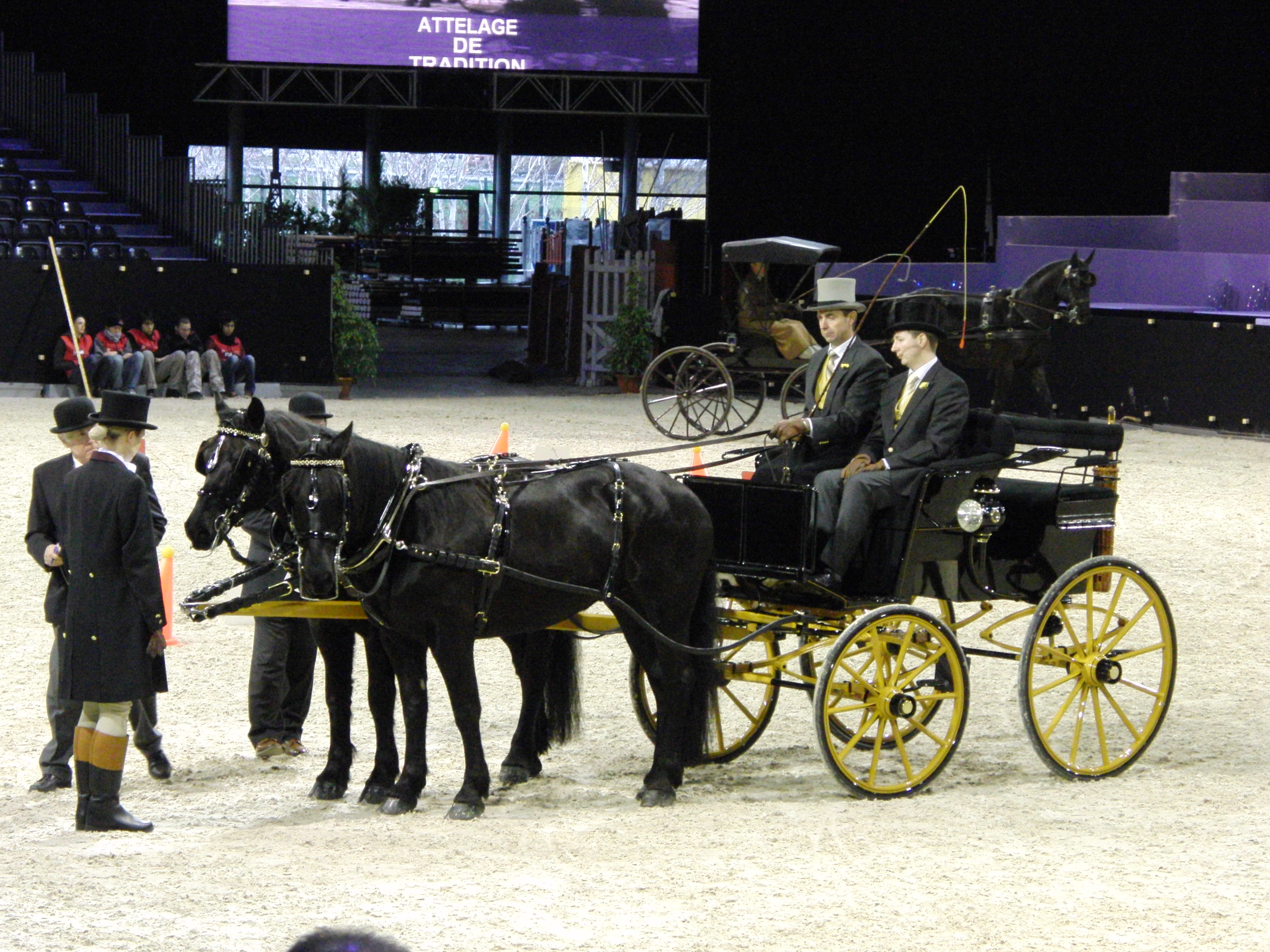
Mérens in harness

In the past Mérens horses were used for farm work, particularly on steep or difficult terrain, as packhorses and for draft work in mining or hauling timber or sledges. Today, following breeding selection towards a slightly taller and livelier type, they are used principally as saddle horses, especially for trekking in mountainous areas; but have also proved successful in carriage driving. Some have been used for vaulting, dressage, show jumping and three-day eventing.

The Mérens is now considered a multi-purpose recreational horse that is also attached to the cultural identity of the Ariège region. They are used for leisure and competitive trail riding. They are consistently ranked in the French national competitive trail riding championships, and in 1998, a Mérens finished second in the European Championships. In 1998, Stéphane Bigot made a crossing of the Pyrenees on a Mérens. Many tourist facilities now offer guided trail rides through the mountains of Ariège on Mérens horses, with some centers having a stable consisting entirely of members of the breed.

Several equine therapy centers use the Mérens in their program. Other uses for the breed include various agricultural work, including logging, where sure-footed mountain horses can be used to access areas where equipment cannot go. Mounted police sometimes use the Mérens. A few are bred for their milk, which can be used in the manufacture of various products.

== See also ==
- List of French horse breeds
