= Mérens-les-Vals =

Commune in Occitanie, France

- Commune
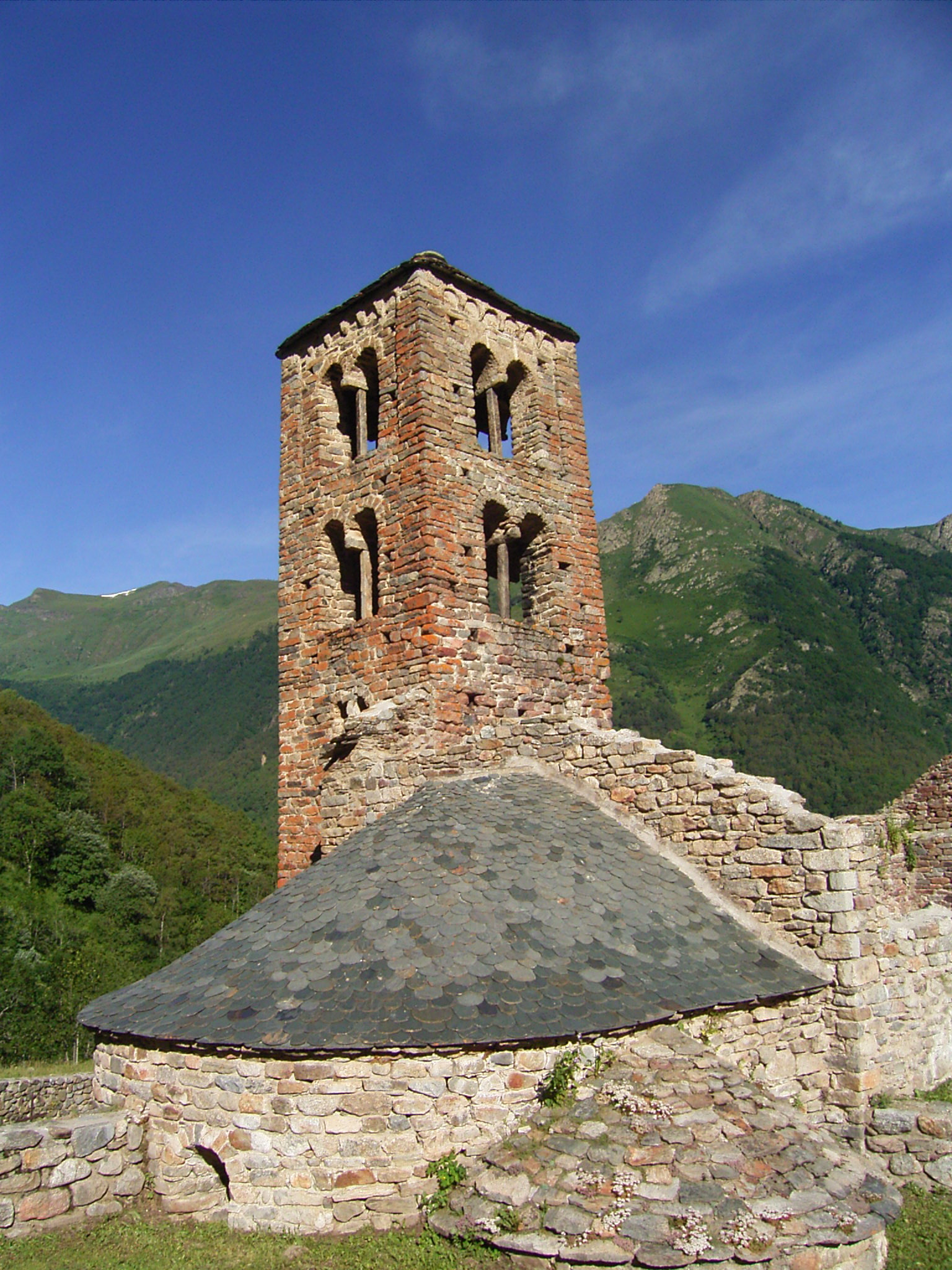
- The church in Mérens-les-Vals

- Coat of arms
- Location of Mérens-les-Vals
- Location within France Location within Occitanie
- Coordinates: 42°39′32″N 1°50′13″E
- Country: France
- Region: Occitania
- Department: Ariège
- Arrondissement: Foix
- Canton: Haute-Ariège

Government
  - Mayor (2020–2026): Jean-Pierre Sicre
- Area^{1}: 80.12 km^{2} (30.93 sq mi)
- Elevation: 1,050 m (3,440 ft)
- Highest elevation: 2,840 m (9,320 ft)
- Lowest elevation: 929 m (3,048 ft)
- Population (2023): 166
  - Density: 2.07/km^{2} (5.37/sq mi)
- Time zone: UTC+01:00 (CET)
  - Summer (DST): UTC+02:00 (CEST)
- INSEE/Postal code: 09189 /09110
- ^{1} French Land Register data, which excludes lakes, ponds, glaciers > 1 km^{2} (0.386 sq mi or 247 acres) and river estuaries.

Mérens-les-Vals (French pronunciation: [meʁɛ̃s le vals]; Languedocien: Merens las Vals) is a commune in the Ariège department in southwestern France.

== Geography ==
Mérens-les-Vals, as its name implies, has several valleys. The village is at the confluence of three valleys: Ariège, Nabre and Morgoulliou. The village has a train station (Mérens-les-Vals station) on the Portet-Saint-Simon–Puigcerdà railway. The night train from Gare d'Austerlitz, Paris to Latour-de-Carol stops here. The journey taking about nine hours. There are six local trains a day to Toulouse, this journey takes 2 hours and 15 minutes.

== Population ==
Inhabitants are called Mérengois in French.

Historical population
Year	Pop.	±% p.a.
1968	195	—
1975	157	−3.05%
1982	143	−1.33%
1990	149	+0.52%
1999	180	+2.12%
2007	187	+0.48%
2012	178	−0.98%
2017	168	−1.15%
2023	166	−0.20%
Source: INSEE

== See also ==
- Communes of the Ariège department
- Mérens horse
