= Andorre–L'Hospitalet station =

Railway station in L'Hospitalet-près-l'Andorre, France

Andorre–L'Hospitalet
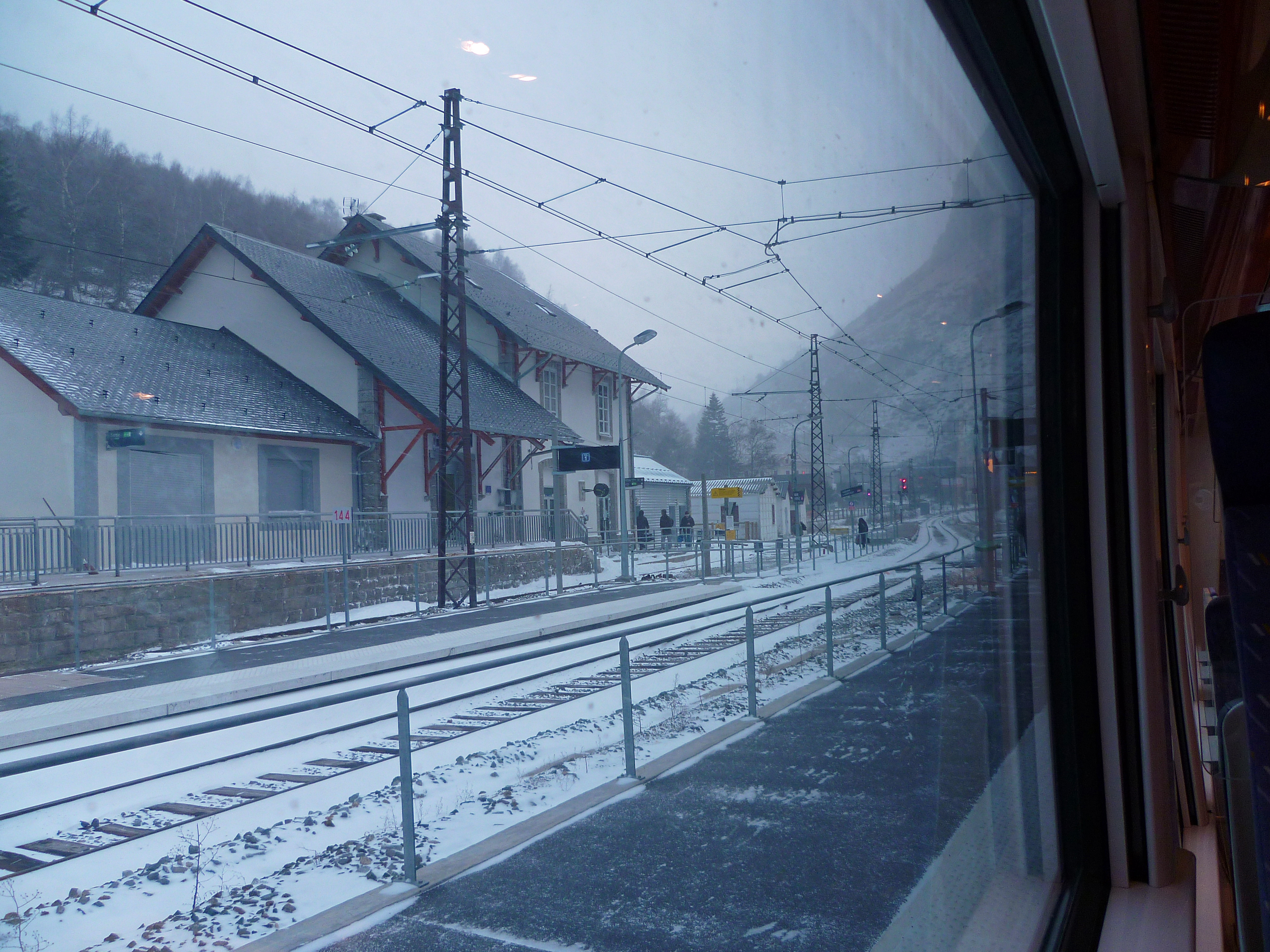
- L'Hospitalet-près-l'Andorre railway station

General information
- Location: L'Hospitalet-près-l'Andorre, Ariège, Occitanie; France
- Coordinates: 42°35′20″N 1°48′00″E
- Line: Portet-Saint-Simon–Puigcerdà railway
- Platforms: 2
- Tracks: 2

Other information
- Station code: 87611517

History
- Opened: 22 July 1929

Services
Preceding station	SNCF	Following station
Mérens-les-Vals towards Paris-Austerlitz	Intercités (night)	Porté-Puymorens towards Latour-de-Carol
Preceding station	TER Occitanie	Following station
Mérens-les-Vals towards Toulouse	11	Porté-Puymorens towards Latour-de-Carol
Location
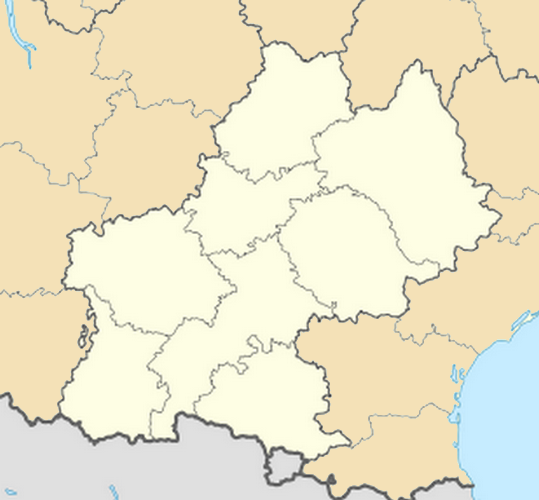
- Location within Midi-Pyrénées Location within France

Andorre–L'Hospitalet (before 2008: L'Hospitalet-près-l'Andorre) is a railway station in L'Hospitalet-près-l'Andorre, Occitanie, France. The station is on the Portet-Saint-Simon–Puigcerdà railway and was opened on 22 July 1929. The station is served by TER (local) and Intercités de nuit (night trains) services operated by the SNCF. The station is 1429m above sea level.

== Train services ==
The following services currently call at L'Hospitalet-près-l'Andorre:

- night service (Intercités de nuit) Paris–Toulouse–Pamiers–Latour-de-Carol–Enveitg
- local service (TER Occitanie) Toulouse–Foix–Latour-de-Carol–Enveitg

== Bus services ==
This station can be used for connections to Andorra. Three buses per day operate, leaving L'Hospitalet-près-l'Andorre at 07:45 and 19:45. An SNCF bus also leaves the station at 09:35 running as far as Pas de la Casa from where connections are available using local buses to other towns within Andorra (see external links below).
