= Foix Tunnel =

Road tunnel in France

Coordinates: 42°57′22″N 1°37′25″E

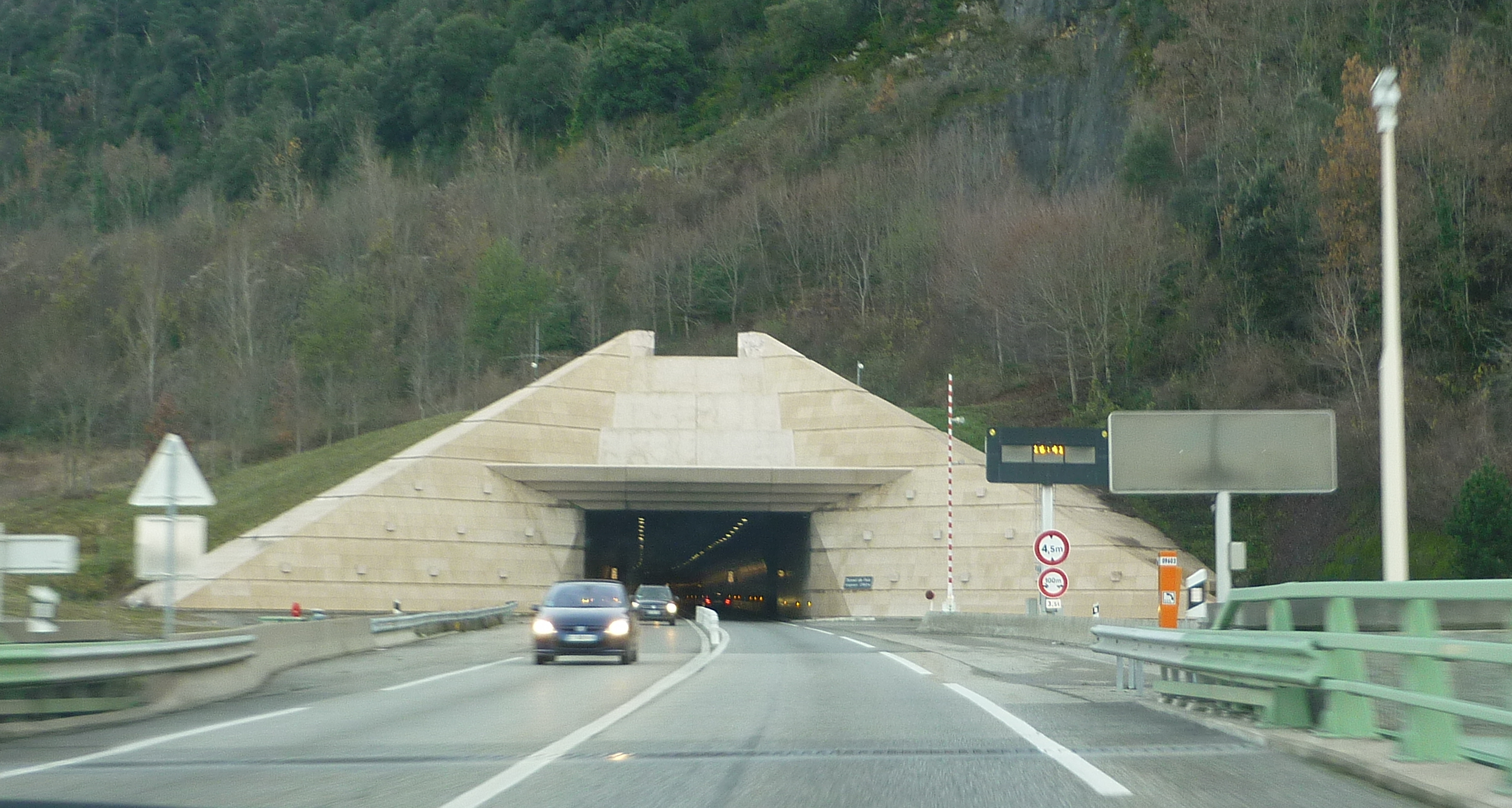
Foix Tunnel

The Foix Tunnel is a tunnel located in Foix in the French department of Ariège on the RN20. Construction began in March 1996 and the tunnel opened on 30 October 2004. It has one tube with a length of 2,159 m.
