= Port d'Envalira =

- Envalira Pass (in English)
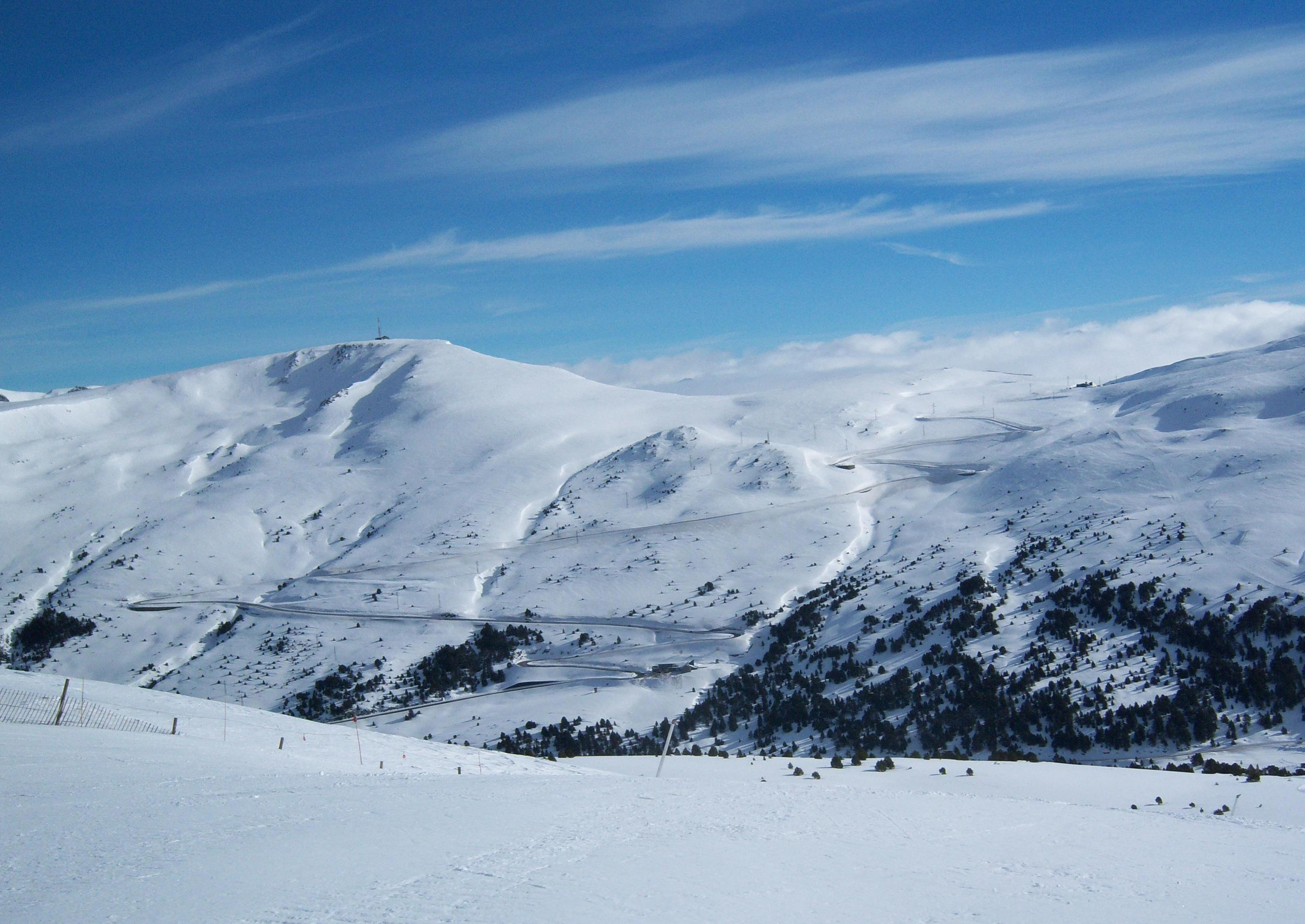
- Port d'Envalira

- Location within Andorra
- Elevation: 2,408 m (7,900 ft)

Location
- Location: Encamp, Andorra
- Range: Pyrenees
- Coordinates: 42°32′24.2″N 1°43′10.58″E

Port d'Envalira (el. 2408 m.) is a mountain pass in the Pyrenees in Andorra, that connects El Pas de la Casa with the rest of the country. It is the highest paved road in the Pyrenees. The climb has been featured several times at the Tour de France and Vuelta a España cycling races.

The construction of a toll tunnel to avoid the mountain pass started in 1999 and opened to traffic in 2002. The tunnel is located at an altitude of about 2000 metres and is nearly 3 kilometres long.

== History ==
Port d'Envalira has played an important role in the development of winter sports in Andorra. In the early 1930s, it became one of the first skiing areas in the country and is considered by some historians as potentially "the first skiable domain of Andorra". On 3 December 1933, the "xalet refugi d'Envalira" (Envalira refuge chalet) was inaugurated at the foot of Port d'Envalira. This chalet was established by Àlvar Menéndez, who repurposed a workers' cabin that had been built for those constructing the Port d'Envalira road. The refuge quickly became a central hub for skiing activities and winter tourism in Andorra.

The Port d'Envalira area served as a nucleus for organizing skiing trips and excursions to nearby peaks, valleys, and lakes, including the Circ dels Pessons, Pic d'Ensagents, and Pic del Maià. The first international ski race within Andorran borders was held here on 10 December 1933, and the area later hosted the first Easter Championship in 1936, which attracted international skiers from neighbouring countries and as far as Italy and Germany.

In the 1934–1935 winter season, the first mechanized ski lift in Andorra's history was established in the area—a service described as "autoxinilla" that carried skiers and hikers from Soldeu and surroundings up to the refuge chalet.

An important development for access to the area came on 7 December 1957, when Andreu Claret was given the concession to keep the Port d'Envalira road open during winter. This innovation significantly improved accessibility to the ski areas during the winter months and contributed to the growth of winter tourism in the region. The history of Port d'Envalira as a skiing destination predates many of the larger commercial ski domains that would later develop in Andorra, making it an important pioneer in the country's winter sports history.

== See also ==
- List of highest paved roads in Europe
- Souvenir Henri Desgrange
