= Porté-Puymorens station =

Railway station in Occitanie, France

Porté-Puymorens
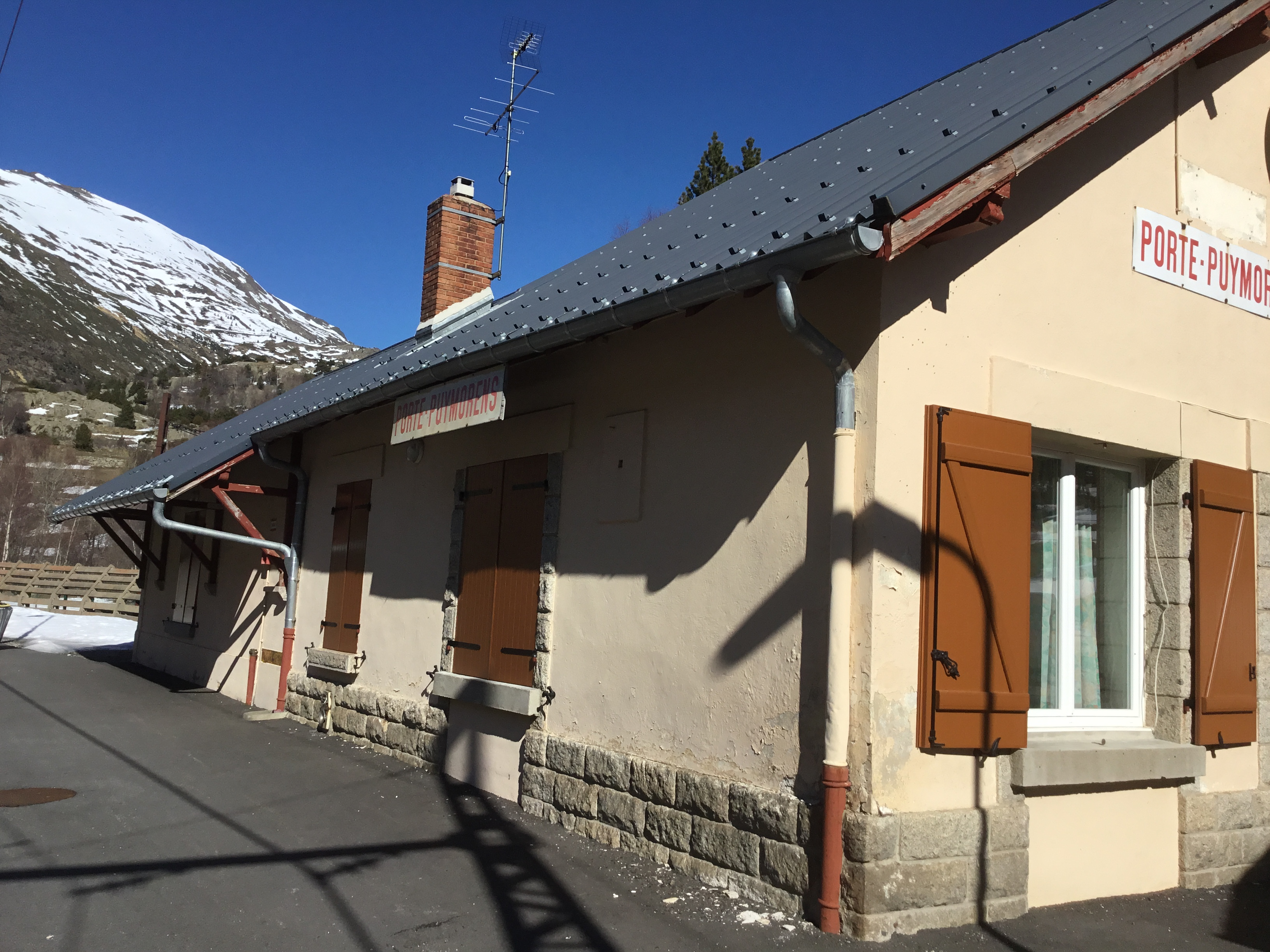
- Porté-Puymorens railway station

General information
- Location: Porta, Pyrénées-Orientales, Occitanie, France
- Coordinates: 42°32′19″N 1°49′29″E
- Line: Portet-Saint-Simon–Puigcerdà railway
- Platforms: 1
- Tracks: 1

Other information
- Station code: 87611509

History
- Opened: 22 July 1929

Services
Preceding station	SNCF	Following station
Andorre-L'Hospitalet towards Paris-Austerlitz	Intercités (night)	Latour-de-Carol Terminus
Preceding station	TER Occitanie	Following station
Andorre-L'Hospitalet towards Toulouse	11	Latour-de-Carol Terminus
Location

Porté-Puymorens is a railway station 1 km south-west of Porté-Puymorens, Occitanie, France. The station is on the Portet-Saint-Simon–Puigcerdà railway. The station is served by TER (local) and Intercités de nuit (night trains) services operated by the SNCF. The station is 1529m above sea level.

== Train services ==
The following services currently call at Porté-Puymorens:

- night service (Intercités de nuit) Paris–Toulouse–Pamiers–Latour-de-Carol
- local service (TER Occitanie) Toulouse–Foix–Latour-de-Carol-Enveitg
