= Envalira Tunnel =

Road tunnel in Andorra

- Location in the eastern Pyrenees of Europe
- Interactive map of Envalira Tunnel

Overview
- Location: Europe: eastern Pyrenees
- Coordinates: 42.540056°N 1.719606°E
- Status: Open 24 hrs/day
- Start: Pas de la Casa, Encamp, Andorra
- End: Grau Roig, Encamp, Andorra

Operation
- Work began: August 1999
- Constructed: 1999–2002
- Opened: 2002
- Operator: Globalvia
- Traffic: Automotive
- Character: Passenger & freight
- Toll: €7.00 (one-way), 2022 passenger vehicle

Technical
- Length: 2.050 km (1.274 mi)
- No. of lanes: 2
- Operating speed: 40–70 km/h (25–43 mph)
- Max elevation: 2,052 m (6,732 ft); Grau Roig
- Min elevation: 2,043 m (6,703 ft); Pas de la Casa

The Envalira Tunnel (Catalan: Túnel d'Envalira) is a tunnel in Andorra that runs between Pas de la Casa near the Andorra-France border and Grau Roig (Ski resort). It enables its users to avoid the Envalira Pass. It is amongst the highest road tunnels in Europe.

Although situated within the borders of Andorra, the entrance at Pas de la Casa can be reached only via a bridge that is situated in France. The Andorra/France border post is therefore situated 2 km within France, northeast of the access bridge, on RN22. On the French side it is connected to RN22, and on the Andorran side to the CGII.

Plans for a tunnel were developed in Andorra during the late 1950s. In 1963, the Envalira Tunnel design tender was awarded to French engineers Semet and Phillip Studies, and subsequent negotiations were conducted for years and the access roads were improved. On June 1, 1999, Spanish companies FCC and NECSO (today ACCIONA) began construction work on the Grau Roig side of the massif; and on August 2, 1999, work began on the Pas de la Casa side.

== Operator and concession ==
The tunnel is operated by Net de Gerrers, an alternative asset manager with headquarters in Valencia, Spain, as a toll tunnel. The concession period is for 50 years. The construction cost was 11 billion pesetas (approx. 80 million euros).
