= L'Hospitalet-près-l'Andorre =

Commune in Occitanie, France

- Commune
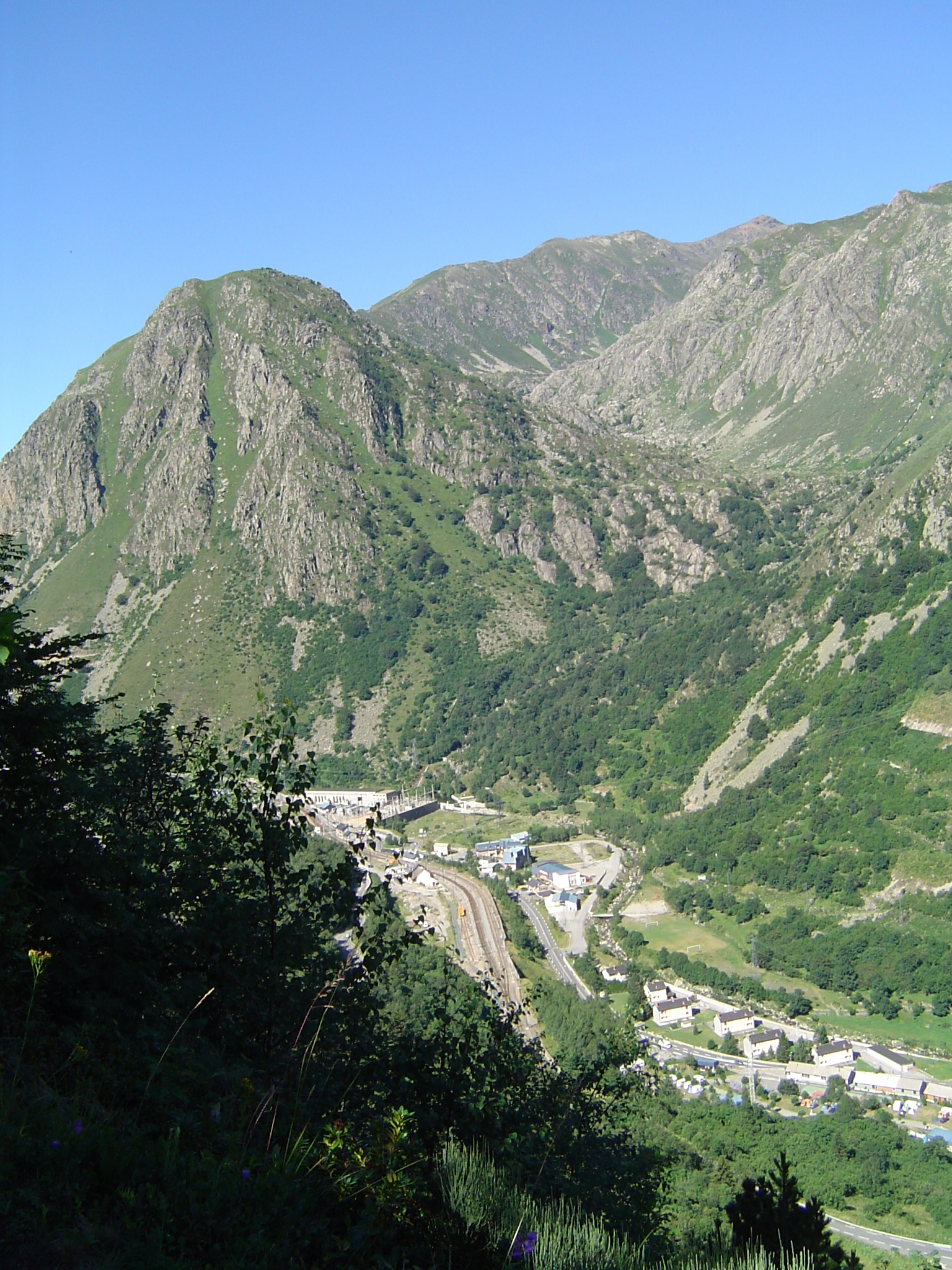
- A general view of L'Hospitalet-près-l'Andorre
- Location of L'Hospitalet-près-l'Andorre
- Location within France Location within Occitanie
- Coordinates: 42°35′30″N 1°48′14″E
- Country: France
- Region: Occitania
- Department: Ariège
- Arrondissement: Foix
- Canton: Haute-Ariège

Government
  - Mayor (2020–2026): Arnaud Diaz
- Area^{1}: 26.12 km^{2} (10.08 sq mi)
- Elevation: 1,446 m (4,744 ft)
- Highest elevation: 2,816 m (9,239 ft)
- Lowest elevation: 1,279 m (4,196 ft)
- Population (2023): 85
  - Density: 3.3/km^{2} (8.4/sq mi)
- Time zone: UTC+01:00 (CET)
  - Summer (DST): UTC+02:00 (CEST)
- INSEE/Postal code: 09139 /09390
- ^{1} French Land Register data, which excludes lakes, ponds, glaciers > 1 km^{2} (0.386 sq mi or 247 acres) and river estuaries.

L'Hospitalet-près-l'Andorre (French pronunciation: [lɔspitalɛ pʁɛ lɑ̃dɔʁ], literally L'Hospitalet near the Andorra; Occitan: L'Espitalet) is a commune in the Ariège department of southwestern France.

The area has a history of vulnerability to winter avalanches: one such in 1895 killed 12 (nearly 10% of the commune's population at the time), and much destruction was also caused in 1906 and 1929. Avalanches have from time to time blocked the N20, the main road through the commune, the most recent case being in 2008.

== Transport ==
The Andorre-L'Hospitalet station – served by TER Occitanie regional trains between Toulouse and Latour-de-Carol and the overnight Intercités de nuit service between Paris and Latour-de-Carol – is an important international transport node for the nearby principality of Andorra, to which the station is connected by a bus link.

== Local government ==
The village has a Mairie from which local government is organised. There is an elected mayor. The office is currently held by Arnaud Diaz.

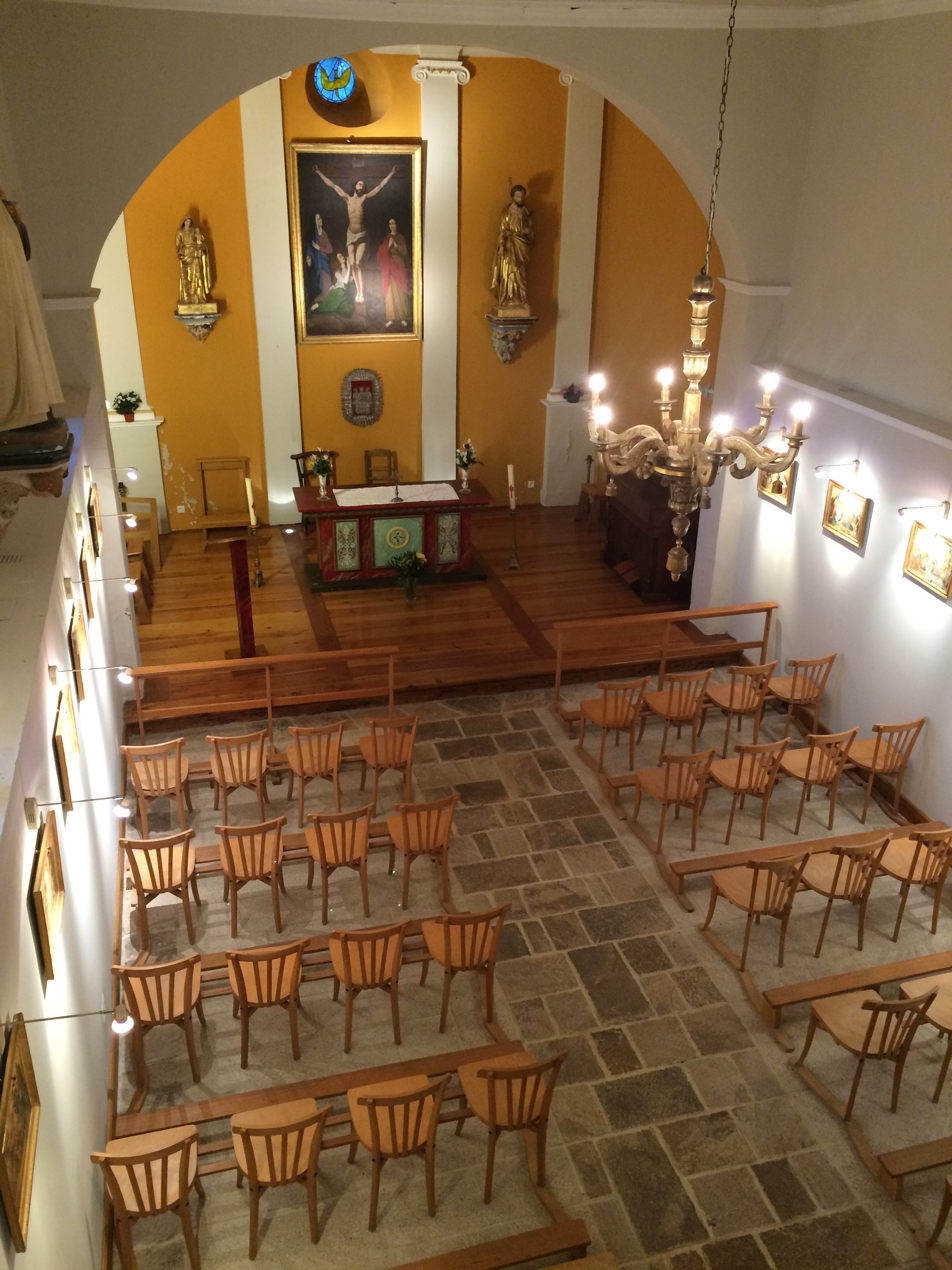
Interior of the parish church at L'Hospitalet-près-l'Andorre.

== Community facilities ==
There is a hotel in the village centre, the Hôtel du Puymorens, which has both a bar and a restaurant open to non-residents, and available to local residents. There is also a small guest house in the main street, operated as part of the French Gîtes system, with a small shop for essential supplies. There are few businesses trading in the village, although there is a small engineering company. There is a primary school, whose buildings include a residential youth centre for visiting groups. A school bus visits L'Hospitalet daily to transport older children to secondary school.

== Religion ==
Roman Catholicism is the only organised religion in the community. There is a parish church, with churchyard, in the main street. Although the village has no resident priest, services are held regularly.

== Population ==
Historical population
Year	Pop.	±% p.a.
1968	161	—
1975	186	+2.08%
1982	171	−1.19%
1990	146	−1.96%
1999	166	+1.44%
2007	98	−6.38%
2012	91	−1.47%
2017	95	+0.86%
2023	85	−1.84%
Source: INSEE

== See also ==
- Communes of the Ariège department
- Andorre-L'Hospitalet station
