= Route nationale 20 =

Road in France

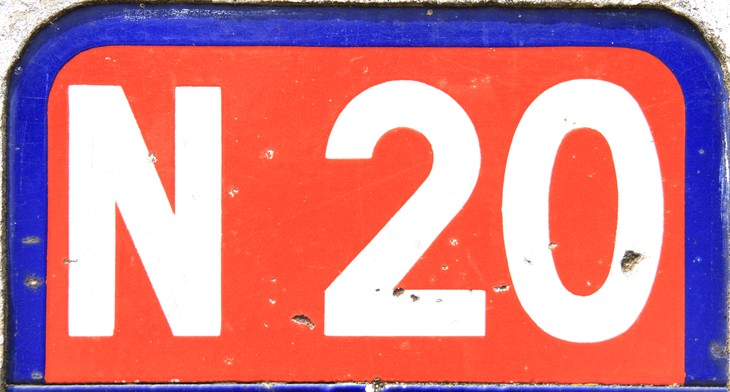
Streetsign of N20

The Route nationale 20 (N20) is a trunk road (nationale) between Paris and the frontier with Spain heading south through the heart of France and passing through the Cathedral City of Orléans and Toulouse. The road forks at Col de Puymorens with one branch being the Route nationale 22 which leads to Andorra. In winter, avalanches sometimes close the road.

== Re-classification ==
This road was originally the main road of the royal domain between Paris and Orléans, built upon a Gaulish road re-worked as a road of the Roman empire.

The N20 is now being upgraded to 2x2 autoroute standard, the majority of which is toll free. The upgrade is to be called the A20 autoroute. The road is also part of the European route E09. Similar work has been undertaken to the N9.

== Route ==
Paris - Étampes - Orléans - Vierzon - Châteauroux - Limoges - Brive-la-Gaillarde - Cahors - Montauban - Toulouse - Pamiers - Foix - Bourg-Madame - Spain (N-152)

=== Paris to Orléans (0 to 104 km) ===
The road starts at the south of the city centre of Paris at the Porte d'Orléans. The road heads south as the Avenue Aristide-Briand through the suburb of Bourg-la-Reine. It crosses the A86 autoroute near Orly Airport. Then past the suburb of Antony and a junction with the A6 autoroute. The old road is renumbered the D217 through an industrial estate and the town of Longjumeau.

The N20 merges again as the Route d'Orléans through Montlhéry and over the N104 and into open rolling countryside which becomes increasingly wooded. The road passes the Bois de la Butte de Couard. The road then comes to the town of Étampes where there is a junction with the N191 (Corbeil-Essonnes to the N10).

The road then heads south west parallel to the A10 autoroute. The road skirts the western edge of the large forest of Orléans (French: Forêt d'Orléans) before entering the cathedral city of Orléans. The N20 crosses the river Loire in the City Centre over the Pont du Maréchal Joffre.

Orléans is a key transport hub forming a junction with the A10 autoroute (L'Aquitaine) and A71 autoroute (L'Arverne) as well as the N157 (Rennes–Le Mans-Orléans), N60 (Troyes–Sens-Orléans) and N152 (Orléans-Blois–Angers–Saumur).

=== Orléans to Limoges (104 km to 351 km) ===
The road heads through the Forêt de Lamotte-Beuvron in heavily wooded countryside and on through the Forêt de Vierzon to Vierzon which lies on the Cher. This town is also a junction with the A71 autoroute which heads to the east and the A20 autoroute (L'Occitane) which is an upgrade of the N20 to autoroute standard. The old road still runs through villages and towns such as Massay and Vatan as the D320.

The road passes round the town of Châteauroux on the Indre. The town is also on the N151 (Auxerre–Bourges–Poitiers) and N143 (Tours-Châteauroux). The road continues south through thick forest coming to the river Creuse. The countryside becomes more hilly. The old road is numbered the N20 and D220 after Argenton-sur-Creuse and Saint-Benoît-du-Sault. The road crosses the N145 (Bellac–Montluçon) 11 km west of the town of La Souterraine.

The road then heads through Bessines-sur-Gartempe and into the Monts d'Ambazac (701m). The road then reaches the industrial centre of Limoges which lies on the river Vienne. The town is also connected by the N141 (Saíntes–Clermont-Ferrand), N21 (Limoges-Lourdes) and N147 (Limoges-Poitiers-Angers).

=== Limoges to Toulouse (351 to 614 km) ===
The road heads south through the massif Central through traffic now being taken as the A20 autoroute with the old road now being the D420 and D920 through the village of Masseret. The old road branches east through Uzerche on the River Vézère. There is a junction with the N120 to Aurillac. It also meets the A89 autoroute.

The old road carries on as the D920 to the regional centre of D920 through Brive-la-Gaillarde. Here there is a junction with N89 and N80. The road heads south and forks again as the A20 becomes a péage (toll) and the N20 starts again. There is a junction with the N140. At Souillac the road crosses the river Dordogne. After which the road rises passing the Bellevoir de lanzac. The roads are now on the plateau of the Causse de Gramat and onto the medieval town of Cahors on a loop in the river Lot.

The N20 continues south heading out of the massif central and into the valley of the river Aveyron via Caussade. The road heads south west in the wide flat valley to Montauban. Then it comes to a junction with the N113 (Narbonne–Bordeaux) along the river Garonne. The A62 autoroute (Autoroute des Deux Mers) crosses the road. The N20 turns south running along the east bank of the river into the industrial city of Toulouse.

The city of Toulouse is on the junction of the Autoroutes A62, A68 (to Albi), A64 (to Pau and Bayonne) and the N88 and N124.

=== Toulouse to Spain (614 to 767 km) ===
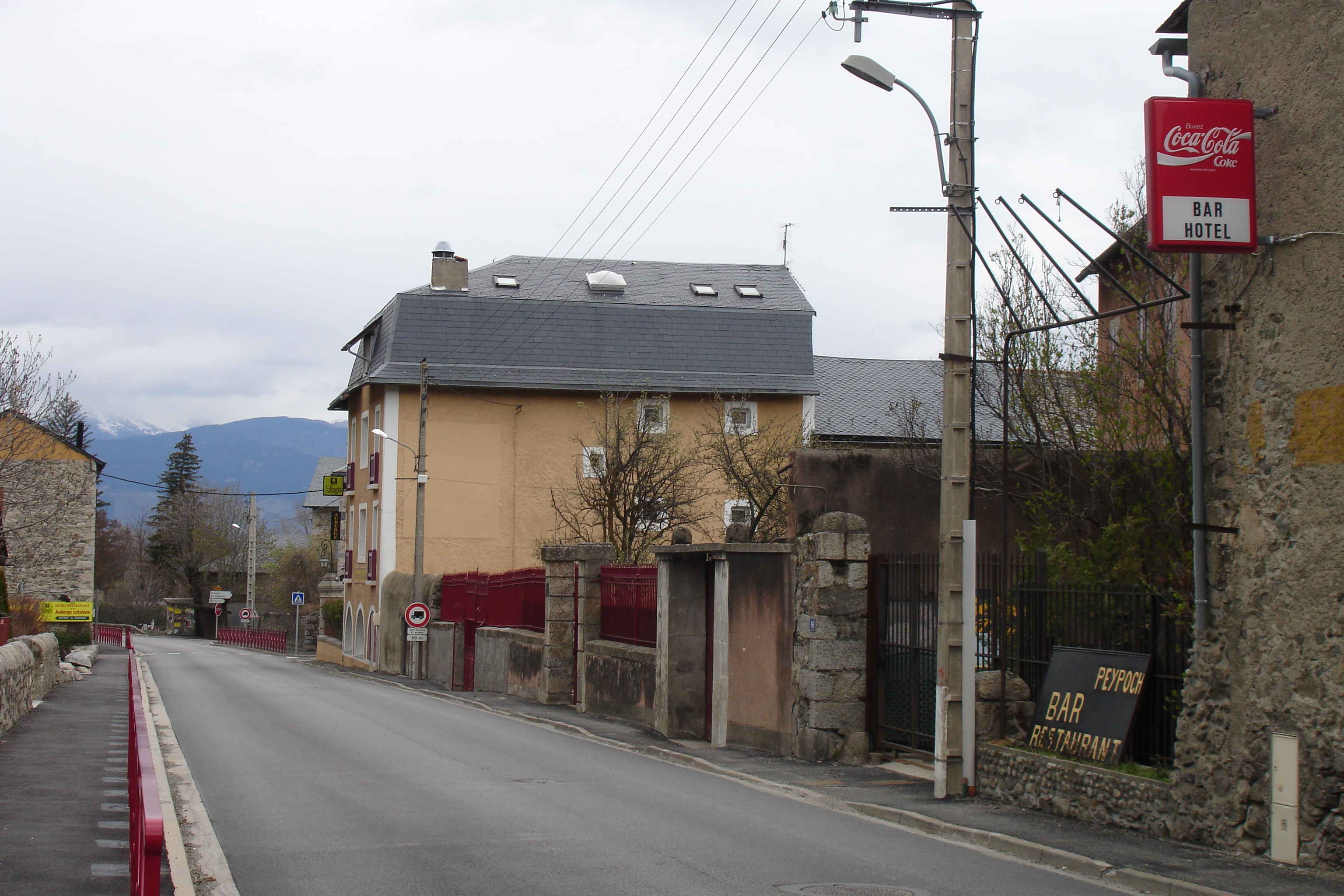
Route nationale 20 passing through Latour-de-Carol.

The road leaves the city centre to the south on the west bank of the River Garonne. At Pinsaguel the road crosses the river and follows the river Ariège and its valley to the south east. The countryside is a mix of open countryside and rolling hills. The road meets the A66 autoroute at Pamiers.

South of Pamiers the road enters the foothills of the Pyrenees such as the Montagnes du Plantaurel. The road heads to Foix, which is now by-passed with the Foix Tunnel on the east side of the valley. The road then passes Tarascon-sur-Ariège following the deep river valley. The road passes the Parc Pyrénéen de l'Art Préhistorique and south east to Ax-les-Thermes. To the south-west, there is a ski resort Les Bazerques.

The road forks at the Col de Puymorens (1920 m). The N22 leads in a series of hairpins to the south west and Andorra, crossing the Pas de la Casa (2,085m) or the alternative Túnel d'Envalira. The RN320 now crosses the pass de Puymorens, while the RN20 heads through the Tunnel du Puymorens rather than taking the pass, and heads down to Bourg-Madame.

The road then enters Spain and becomes the N-152 (Carretera) (E09) towards Barcelona. The N116 heads north east from Bourg Madame to Perpignan along the Tech valley.
