= Col de Puymorens =

Mountain pass in the French Pyrenees

Coordinates: 42.560139°N 1.810104°E

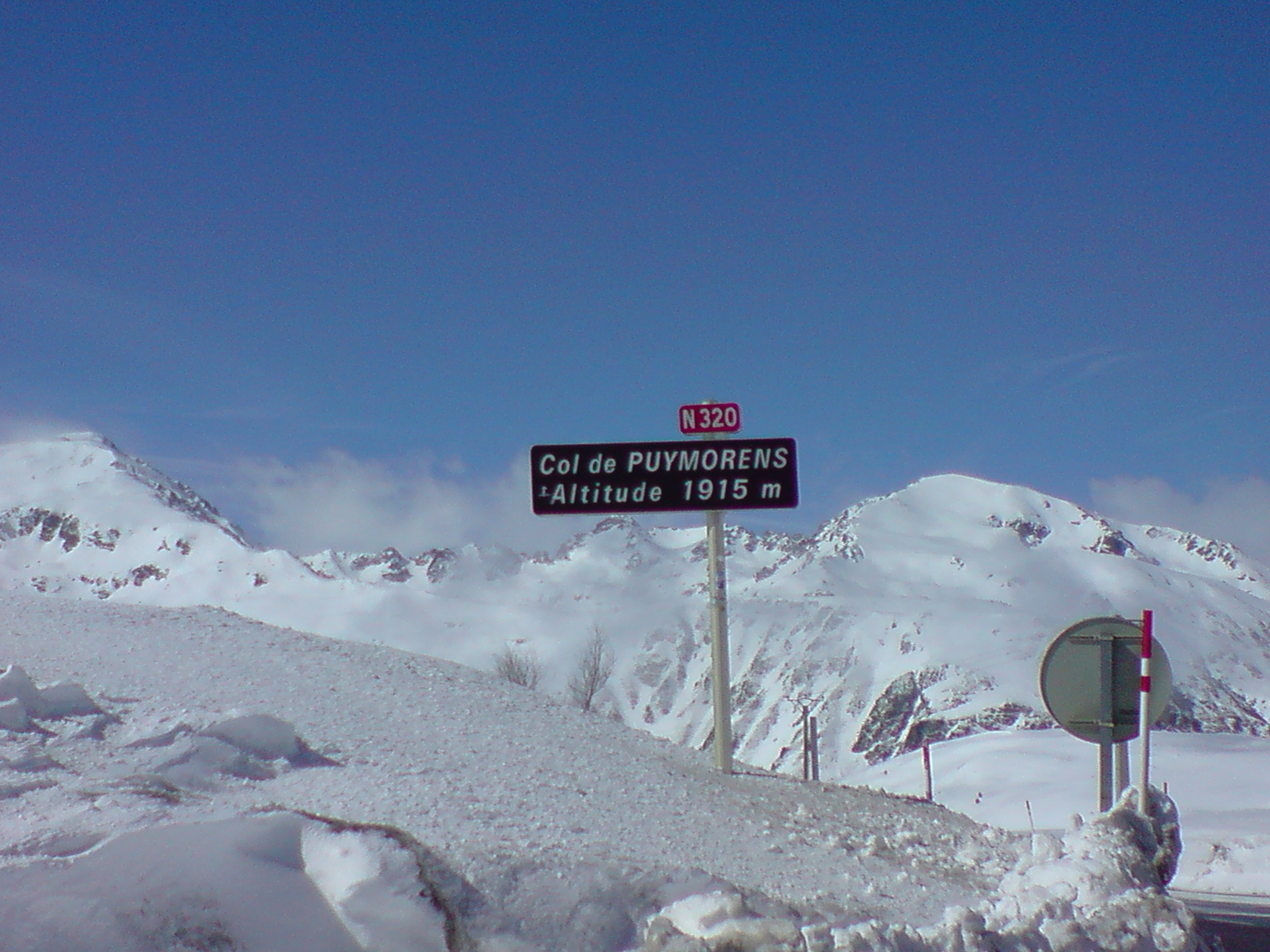
Summit of the Col de Puymorens in winter

The Col de Puymorens ("Puymorens Pass") is a mountain pass in the French Pyrenees, connecting Foix to Cerdagne. Its summit is 1,915m.

The pass historically crossed the border between France and Catalonia, until the Treaty of the Pyrenees in 1659 ceded the whole of this area to the former. It has been a well-travelled route since the 18th century and has featured several times in the Tour de France. In 1994, the pass was bypassed by a tunnel.
