= El Pas de la Casa =

Ski resort in Encamp, Andorra

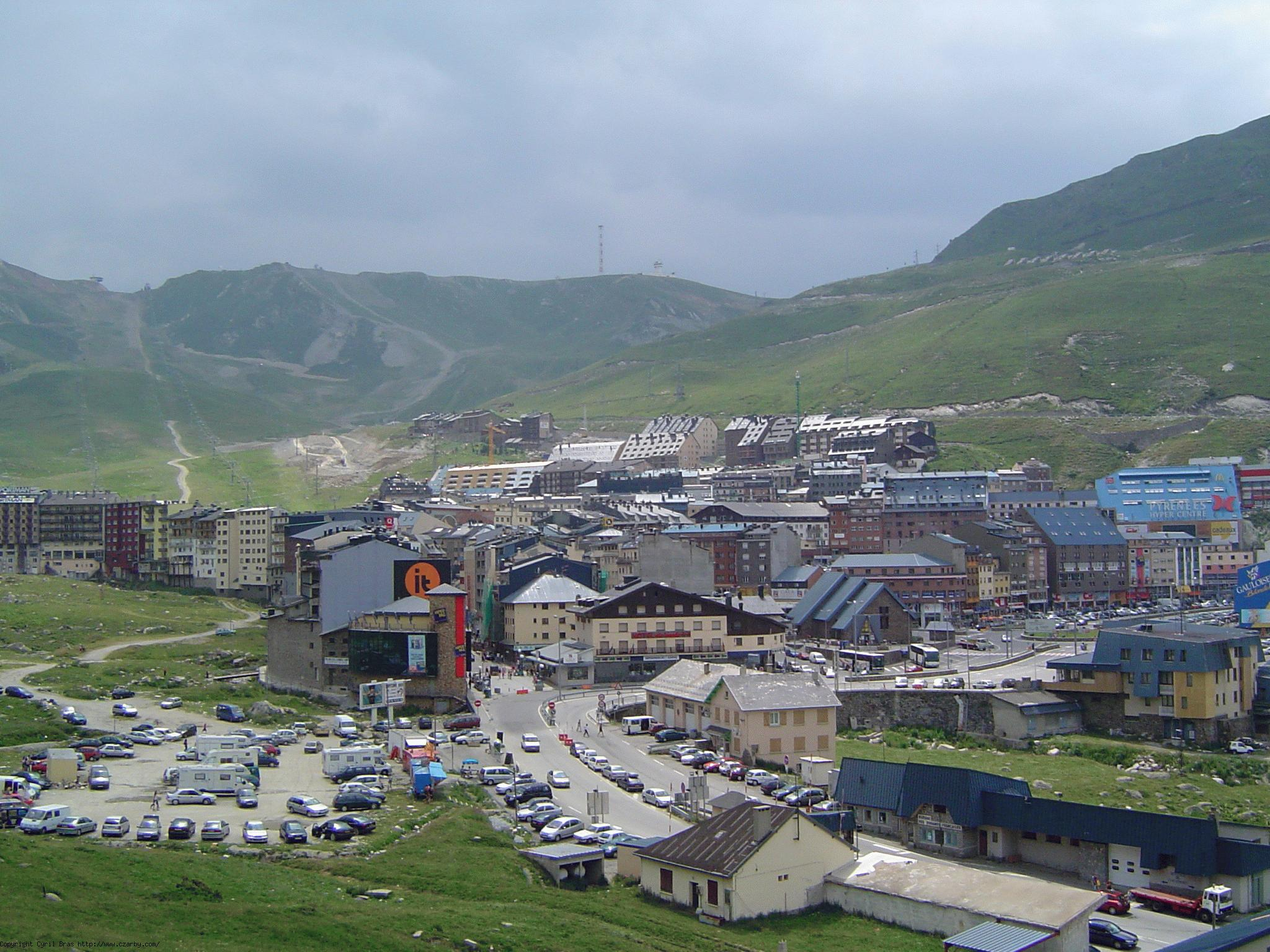

- Location in Andorra
- Coordinates: 42°32′32.41″N 1°44′01.78″E
- Country: Andorra

Government
  - Alcalde: Jordi Torres Arrauz (DA)

Area
  - Total: 17 km^{2} (6.6 sq mi)
- Elevation: 2,080 m (6,820 ft)
- Highest elevation: 2,827 m (9,275 ft)

Population (2012)
  - Total: 2,996
  - Density: 180/km^{2} (460/sq mi)
- Parish: Encamp
- Website: http://www.encamp.ad/

El Pas de la Casa (Catalan pronunciation: [el ˈpaz ðe la ˈkaza]; French: Le Pas de la Case) is a ski resort (part of the Grandvalira resort), town, and mountain pass in the Encamp parish of Andorra, lying on the border with France.

== Overview ==
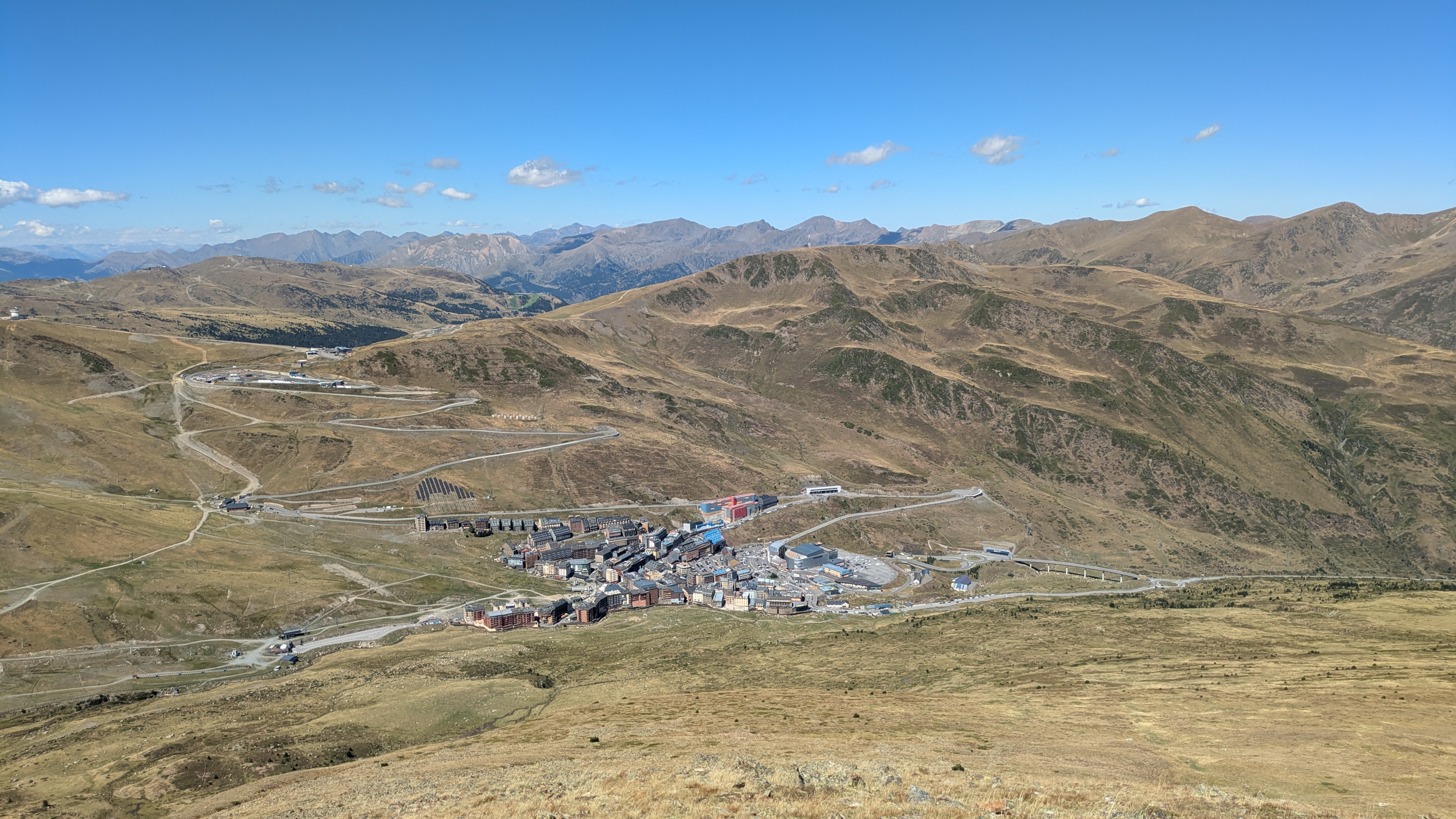
The town of Pas de la Casa, looking to the west, towards Casamanya and other mountains of Andorra.

Its name literally translates as "the pass of the house" and refers to the fact that until the early twentieth century there was only a single shepherd's hut overlooking the pass. The pass marks the watershed of the Pyrenees, being the only point in Andorra where water drains into the Atlantic Ocean, and is the source of the Ariège river. At an elevation of 2,408 metres (7,900 ft) it is one of the highest points on the European road network. The pass is bypassed by the Envalira Tunnel.

The two main sources of wealth are trade and winter sports. The festa major de Sant Pere (Saint Peter's Feast) is held every 29 June in El Pas.

== Ski resort ==
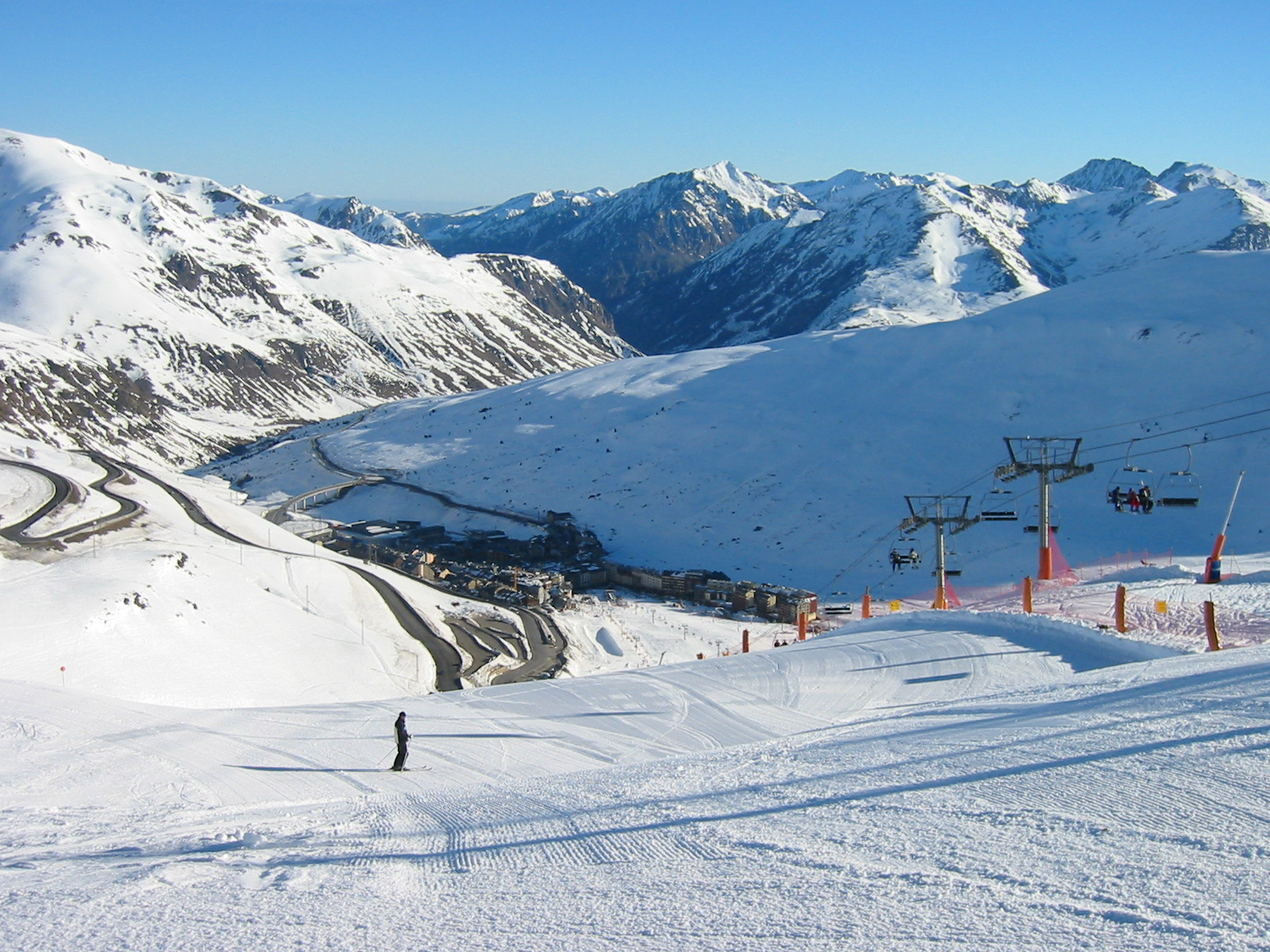
The pass and resort, looking towards France

The ski resort of Pas de la Casa lies below the pass on its French-facing side, beneath the Pic d'Envalira (2,827 metres (9,275 ft)). Its first ski lift opened in 1957. The resort now has 31 lifts, approximately 100 kilometres (62 mi) of pistes and 6.26 square kilometres (2.42 sq mi) of skiable terrain, with a highest skiable elevation of 2,640 metres (8,661 ft).

Pas de la Casa is among the highest ski resorts in Andorra and is known for generally reliable snow conditions.[1] Its location also makes it relatively accessible from Barcelona and Toulouse airports. The resort attracts visitors from France and Spain, as well as significant numbers of British and Irish skiers and snowboarders. Its duty-free status is also a factor in its popularity, despite comparatively long transfer times from the nearest major airports.[2][3]

The nightlife is particularly youth‑oriented, and a prevalence of red pistes perhaps makes the skiing more suited to intermediates than beginners or the most advanced.

A recent lift link to Soldeu via Grau Roig has created a linked skiing area ranging over almost 10% of Andorra's land area, though not all is skiable.

The nearest airports to El Pas de la Casa are Andorra–La Seu d'Urgell Airport, located 53 km (33 mi) south west, Toulouse–Blagnac Airport, located 170 km (106 mi) north and Josep Tarradellas Barcelona–El Prat Airport, located 198 km (123 mi) south east of the town.

== Climate ==
Pas de la Casa has either a continental climate (Dfb) or oceanic climate (Cfb), depending on the isotherm (0 °C (32 °F)/-3 °C (27 °F) respectively) used, closely bordering their cold-summer variants (Dfc/Cfc respectively) however, since June/September average temperatures barely reach over 10 °C (50 °F), with areas at slightly higher elevations ultimately being lower than that and falling into the cold-summer variants.

Precipitation is relatively abundant year-round, with a notable February dip in precipitation. Summers are generally cool thanks to the high elevation of the town (2080m), and winters often under freezing, with regular snowfall and occasional snowstorms, with the temperature dropping further to below -10 °C (14 °F) some nights during those.

Climate data for Pas de la Casa, elevation: 2,080m (1981-2010)
Month	Jan	Feb	Mar	Apr	May	Jun	Jul	Aug	Sep	Oct	Nov	Dec	Year
Mean daily maximum °C (°F)	1.9 (35.4)	2.6 (36.7)	5.2 (41.4)	6.2 (43.2)	10.7 (51.3)	15.3 (59.5)	19.2 (66.6)	18.7 (65.7)	14.9 (58.8)	10.5 (50.9)	5.3 (41.5)	2.8 (37.0)	9.4 (48.9)
Daily mean °C (°F)	−1.2 (29.8)	−1.0 (30.2)	1.1 (34.0)	2.3 (36.1)	6.4 (43.5)	10.3 (50.5)	13.5 (56.3)	13.3 (55.9)	10.2 (50.4)	6.6 (43.9)	2.0 (35.6)	−0.2 (31.6)	5.3 (41.5)
Mean daily minimum °C (°F)	−4.3 (24.3)	−4.8 (23.4)	−3 (27)	−1.4 (29.5)	2.1 (35.8)	5.4 (41.7)	7.9 (46.2)	7.7 (45.9)	5.3 (41.5)	2.6 (36.7)	−1.1 (30.0)	−3.2 (26.2)	1.2 (34.2)
Average precipitation mm (inches)	87.3 (3.44)	50.8 (2.00)	66.2 (2.61)	109.3 (4.30)	122.1 (4.81)	107.3 (4.22)	81.0 (3.19)	92.8 (3.65)	95.6 (3.76)	102.0 (4.02)	117.7 (4.63)	94.8 (3.73)	1,126.6 (44.35)
Source: ACDA

== Demographics ==
=== Languages ===
French is the main language of communication next to the official language, Catalan.

== Notable people ==
- Laure Soulie (born 1987 in El Pas de la Casa) is a retired Andorran biathlete, competed at the 2014 Winter Olympics

== Gallery ==
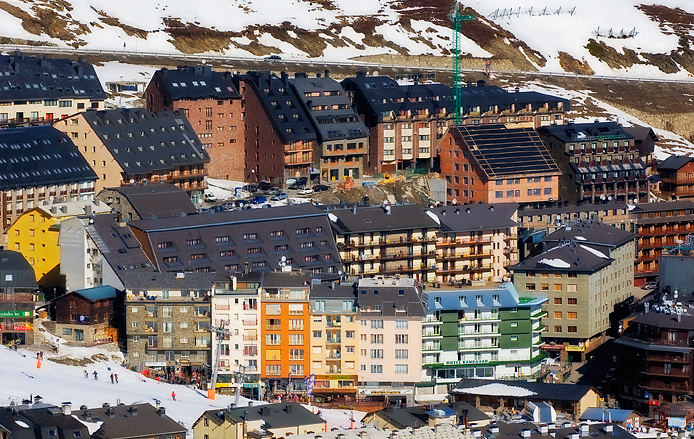
View of the ski resort

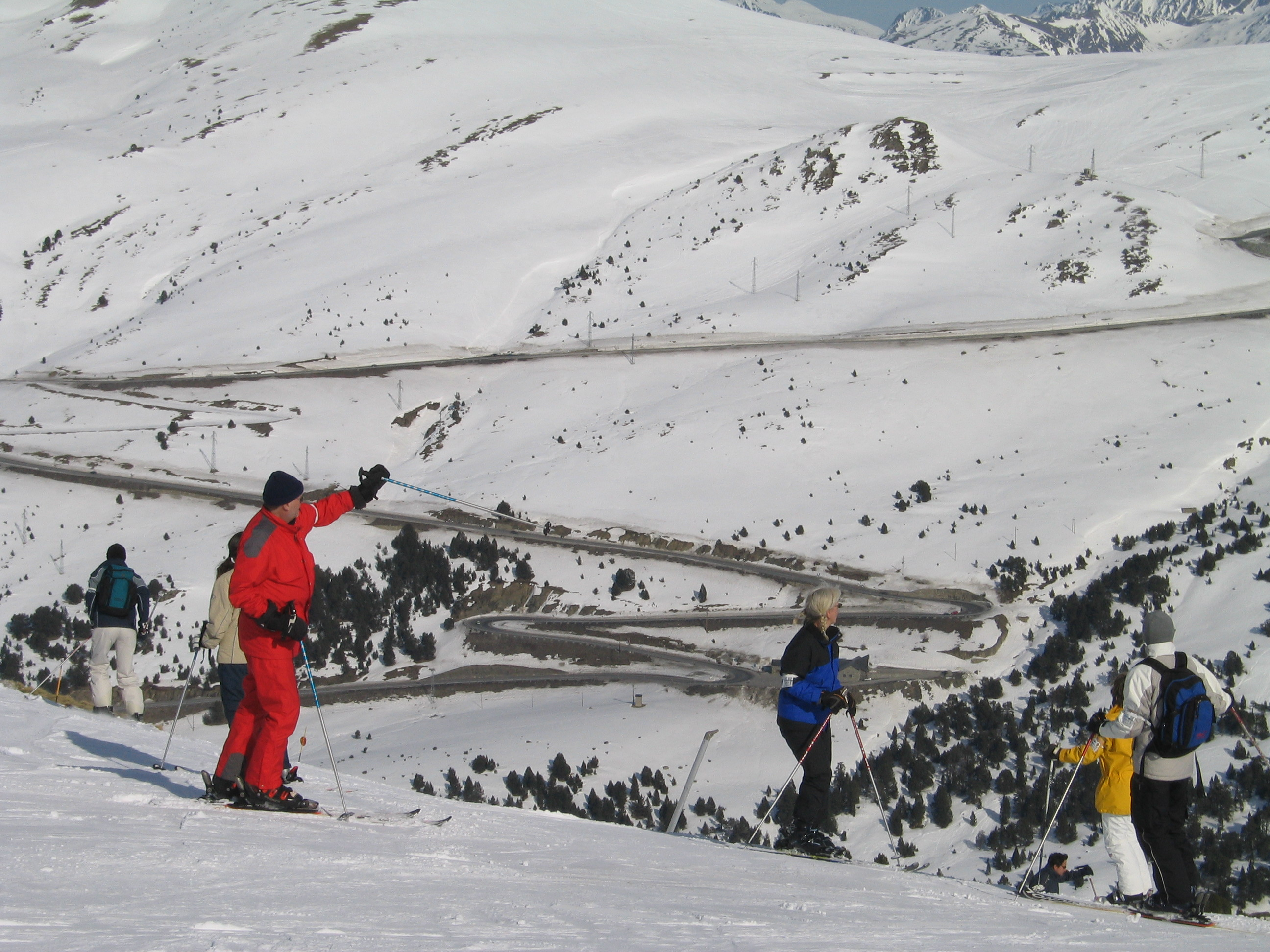
The pass, and a man on skis pointing using his ski pole
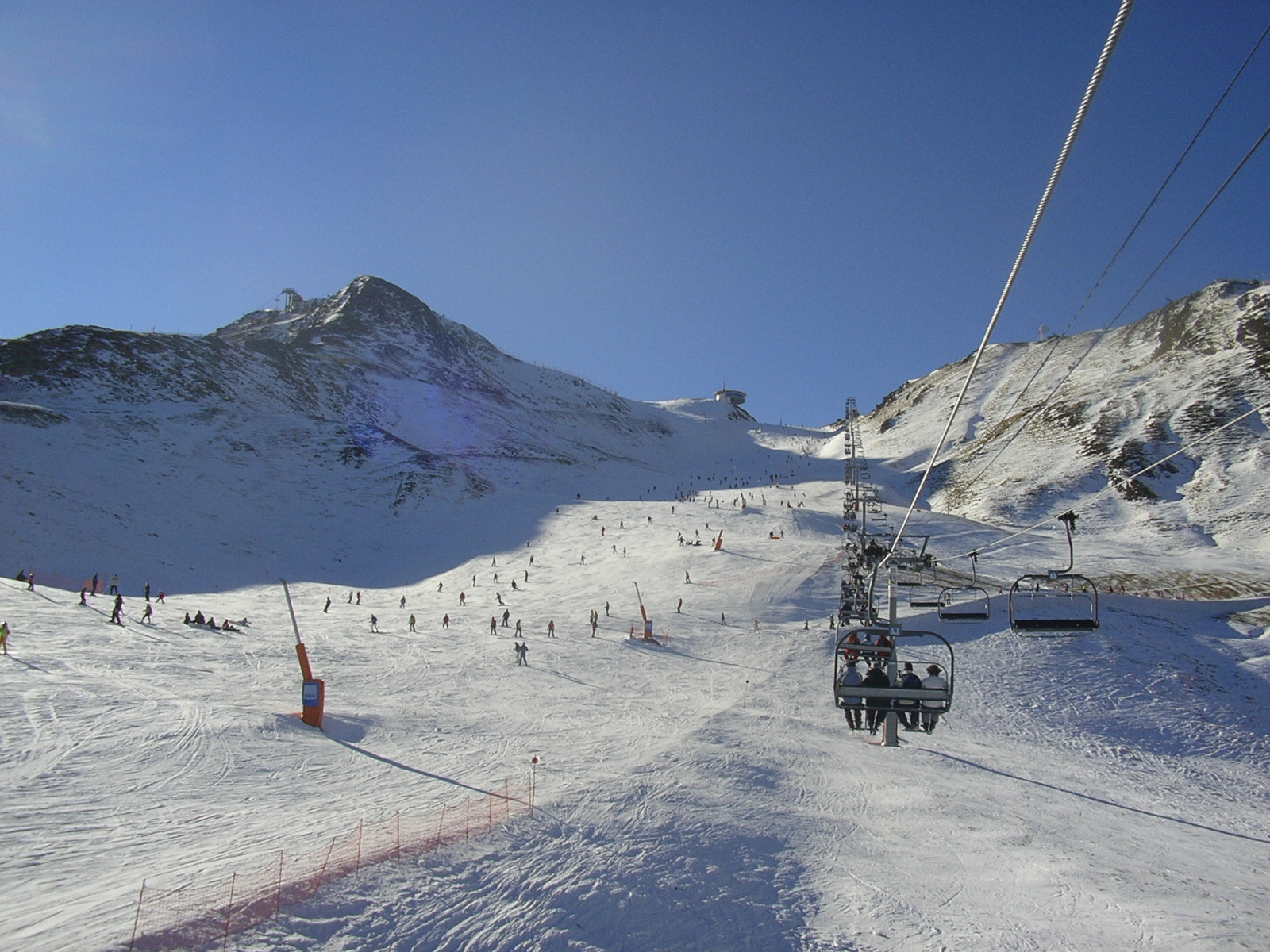
The ski lift and piste at Pas de la Casa with the Pic d'Envalira in the background

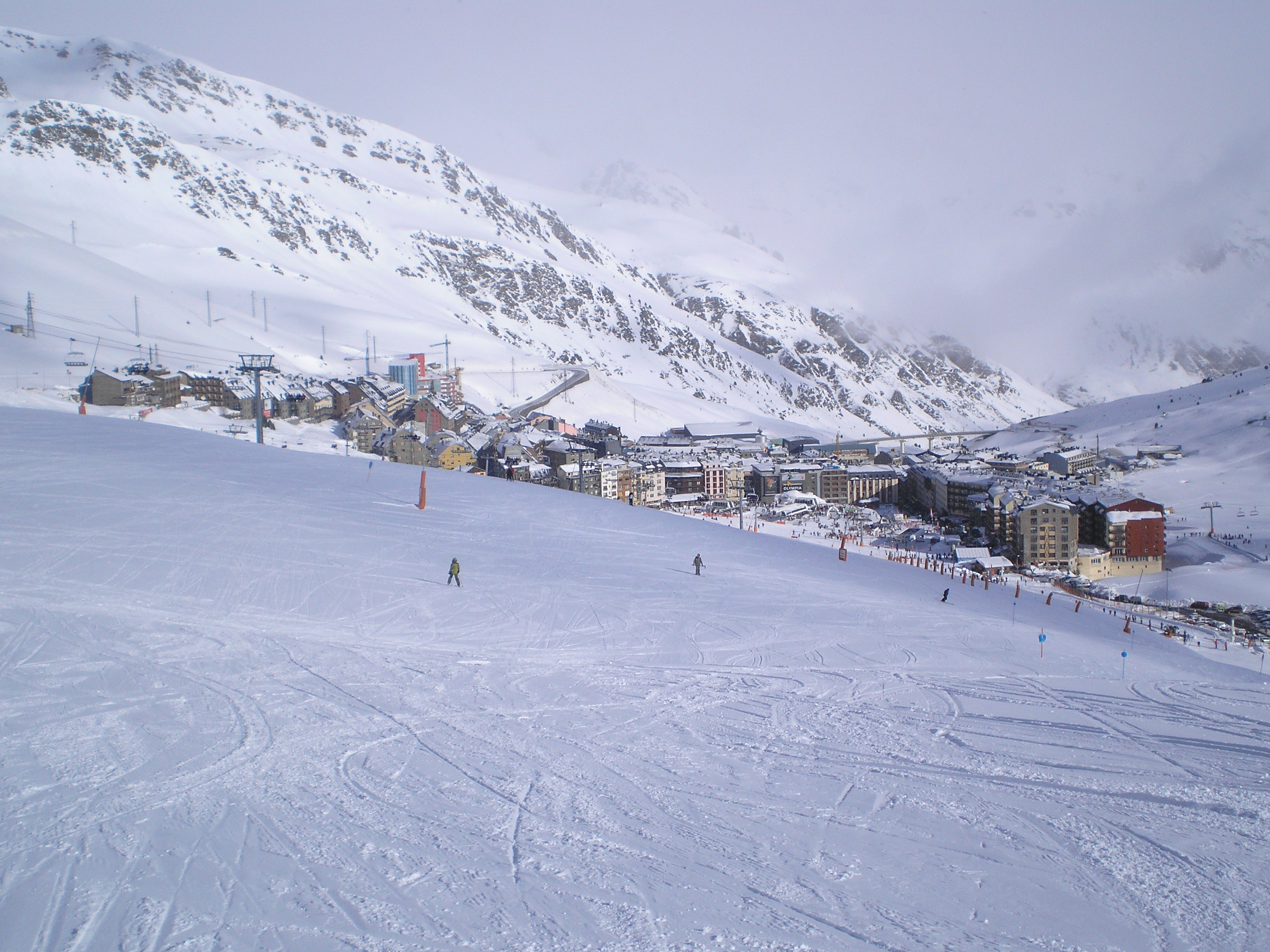
View of the town from the slopes

== See also ==
- List of highest paved roads in Europe
- List of mountain passes
- Vallnord Pal-Arinsal Ordino-Arcalis
