= Latour-de-Carol =

Latour-de-Carol La Tor de Querol (Catalan)
- Commune
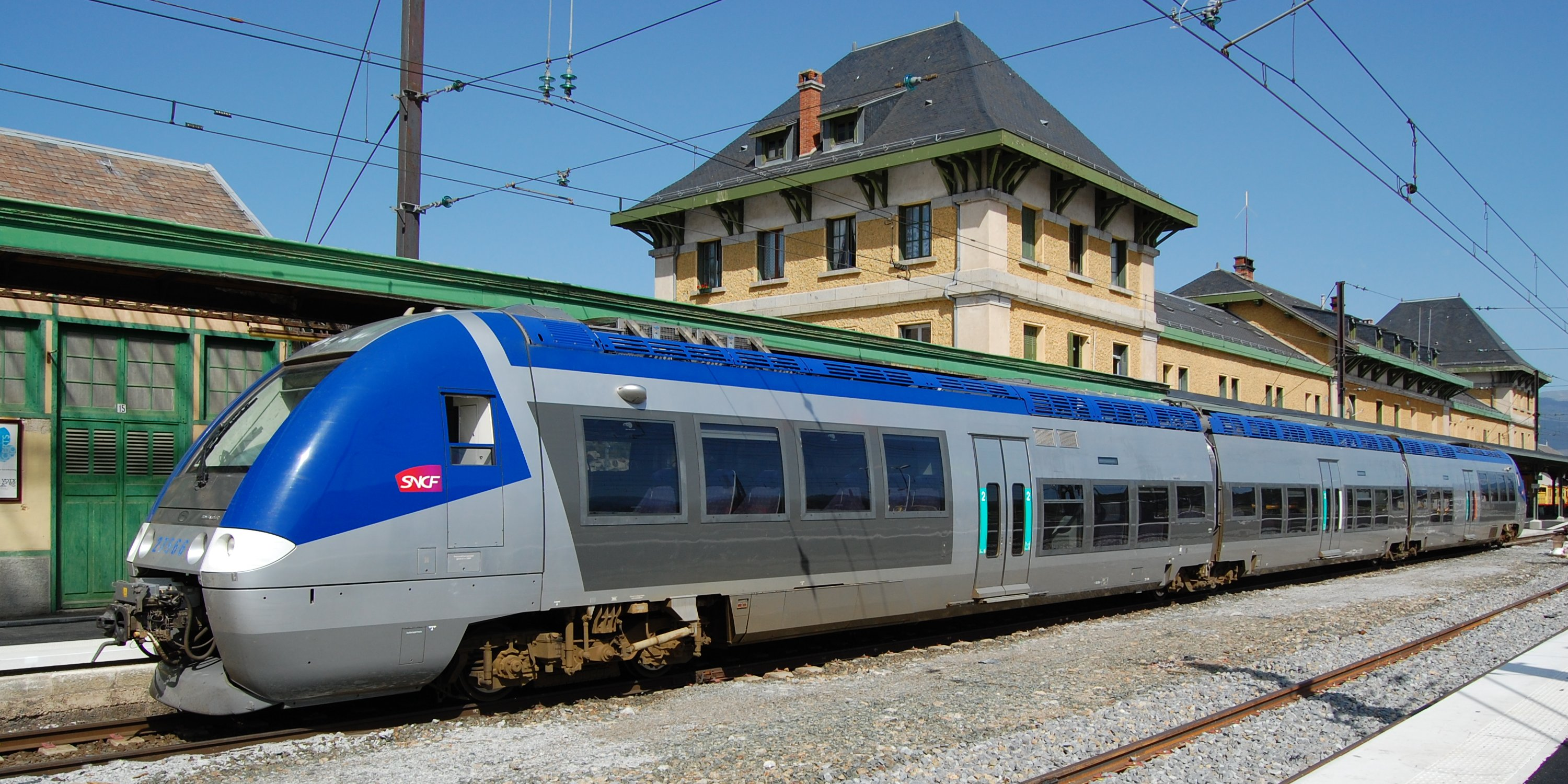
- Railway station

- Coat of arms
- Location of Latour-de-Carol
- Location within France Location within Occitanie
- Coordinates: 42°27′57″N 1°53′23″E
- Country: France
- Region: Occitania
- Department: Pyrénées-Orientales
- Arrondissement: Prades
- Canton: Les Pyrénées catalanes
- Intercommunality: Pyrénées Cerdagne

Government
  - Mayor (2020–2026): Cécile Houyau
- Area^{1}: 12.63 km^{2} (4.88 sq mi)
- Elevation: 1,248 m (4,094 ft)
- Highest elevation: 2,080 m (6,820 ft)
- Lowest elevation: 1,209 m (3,967 ft)
- Population (2023): 480
  - Density: 38/km^{2} (98/sq mi)
- Time zone: UTC+01:00 (CET)
  - Summer (DST): UTC+02:00 (CEST)
- INSEE/Postal code: 66095 /66760
- ^{1} French Land Register data, which excludes lakes, ponds, glaciers > 1 km^{2} (0.386 sq mi or 247 acres) and river estuaries.

Latour-de-Carol (French pronunciation: [latuʁ də kaʁɔl]; Catalan: La Tor de Querol) is a commune in the Pyrénées-Orientales department in southern France.

== Geography ==
=== Localization ===
Latour-de-Carol is located in the canton of Les Pyrénées catalanes and in the arrondissement of Prades.

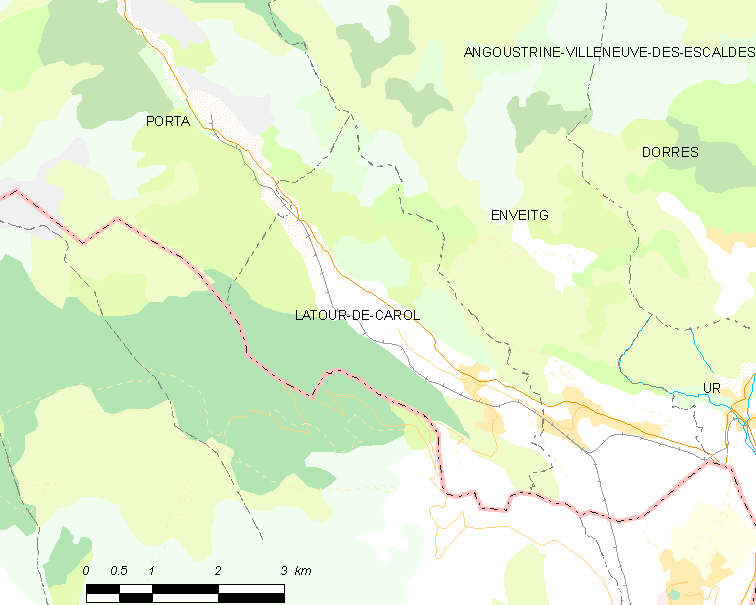
Map of Latour-de-Carol and its surrounding communes

=== Transport ===
The village is the site of the international railway station Gare de Latour-de-Carol-Enveitg (Catalan: La Tor de Querol-Enveig). This station is the terminus of three lines, each with different gauges:

- the Spanish state operator Renfe's 1,668 mm (5 ft 5 21/32 in) gauge line running south to Barcelona via Ripoll
- the French state operator SNCF's 1,435 mm (4 ft 8 1/2 in) gauge line running north to Toulouse via Foix
- SNCF's 1,000 mm (3 ft 3 3/8 in) gauge line (known as the Yellow Train) running east to Villefranche-de-Conflent

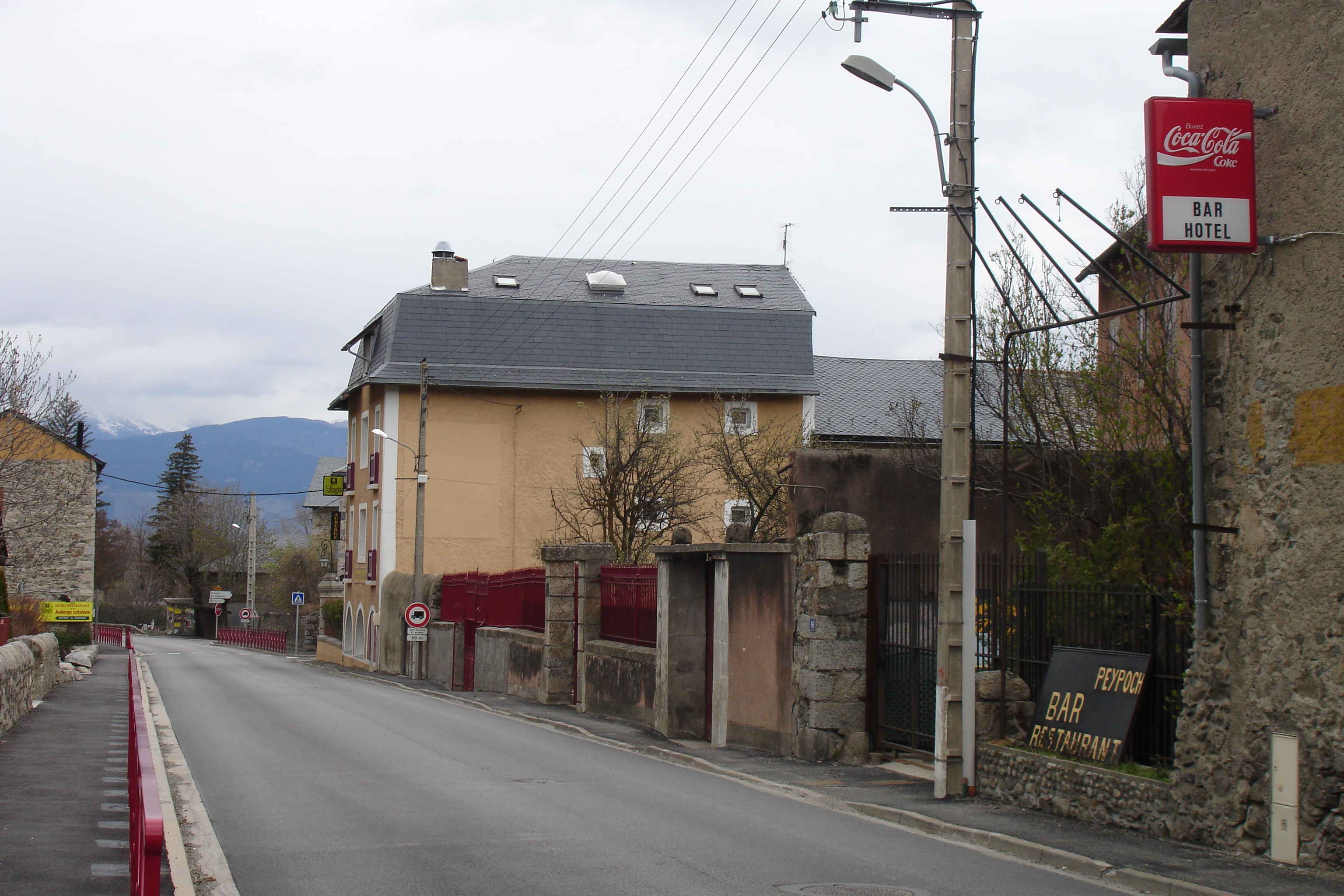
Route nationale 20 passing through Latour-de-Carol. This segment of this road is also part of the European route E09.

As the French and Spanish tracks are different gauges, no trains run the whole way from Toulouse to Barcelona. Passengers have to change trains, which are however no longer scheduled to offer direct connections. Occasional freight-trains cross the border and are worked to Puigcerda, where freight is transferred. The double-track line to Puigcerda consists of two separate tracks with different gauges and electrified at different currents.

European route E09 and part of the Route nationale 20 connect Latour-de-Carol with Bourg-Madame (near the border with Spain) and Foix.

== Population ==
Historical population
Year	Pop.	±% p.a.
1968	359	—
1975	381	+0.85%
1982	390	+0.33%
1990	364	−0.86%
1999	367	+0.09%
2007	401	+1.11%
2012	416	+0.74%
2017	424	+0.38%
2023	480	+2.09%
Source: INSEE

== History ==
The first traces of habitation date from 600 BC. and are located on the site of the hamlet of Iravals. The population moved from the 13th century around the hamlet of Latour-de-Carol, partly abandoning Iravals.

On 1 February 1837 the commune of Porta was created by detachment from Latour-de-Carol.

== Historical monuments ==
- L'ancienne église Saint-Fructueux d'Iravals (XIIc.) est située au hameau éponyme. (Classified as a Monument historique in 1963).
- The church of Saint-Étienne is located on a slight rise to the south of the village. It dates from the 15th century. A reused wooden panel was discovered there at the beginning of the 20th century, used to close the left side of the altar of Saint Sebastian which turned out to come from an altarpiece made by Antoine Peytavi (c.1540-1592) for the Saint-Fructueux chapel in Latour-de-Carol. It was restored and classified as a Monument historique on 24 May 1932.

== See also ==
- Break of gauge
- Communes of the Pyrénées-Orientales department
