= Ludiès =

Commune in Occitanie, France

- Commune
- Coat of arms
- Location of Ludiès
- Location within France Location within Occitanie
- Coordinates: 43°07′10″N 1°42′55″E
- Country: France
- Region: Occitania
- Department: Ariège
- Arrondissement: Pamiers
- Canton: Pamiers-2
- Intercommunality: The Portes d'Ariège Pyrénées

Government
  - Mayor (2020–2026): Danielle Bouché
- Area^{1}: 1.87 km^{2} (0.72 sq mi)
- Elevation: 350 m (1,150 ft)
- Highest elevation: 329 m (1,079 ft)
- Lowest elevation: 257 m (843 ft)
- Population (2023): 102
  - Density: 54.5/km^{2} (141/sq mi)
- Time zone: UTC+01:00 (CET)
  - Summer (DST): UTC+02:00 (CEST)
- INSEE/Postal code: 09175 /09100
- ^{1} French Land Register data, which excludes lakes, ponds, glaciers > 1 km^{2} (0.386 sq mi or 247 acres) and river estuaries.

Ludiès (French pronunciation: [lydjɛs]; Occitan: Ludièrs) is a commune in the Ariège department in southwestern France. Ludiès is a rural commune with 94 inhabitants in 2019, having experienced a sharp increase in population since 1975. It is part of the Pamiers attraction area. Its inhabitants are called Ludéens or Ludéennes.

== Geography ==
The town is located in the department of Ariegè, in the region of Occitania.

It is located 19 km (12 mi) away from Foix, prefecture of the department, and 8 km (5.0 mi) away from Pamiers which is the subprefecture.

The village neighbours several places: Saint-Amadou 1.9 km (1.2 mi) away, La Bastide-de-Lordat (2.8 km [1.7 mi]), Le Carlaret (2.9 km [1.8 mi]), Saint-Félix- de-Tournegat (3.1 km [1.9 mi]), Les Pujols (3.4 km [2.1 mi]), Lapenne (4.2 km [2.6 mi]), Trémoulet (4.3 km [2.7 mi]), Vals (4.5 km [2.8 mi]).

=== Geology and relief ===
The town is located in the Aquitaine Basin, the second largest sedimentary basin in France after the Paris Basin, the entire territory being covered by superficial formations. The outcropping land on the municipal territory is made up of sedimentary rocks dating from the Cenozoic, the most recent geological era on the geological time scale, beginning 66 million years ago. The detailed structure of the outcropping layers is described in sheet "n°1057 - Pamiers" about the harmonized geological map at approximately about 1/50,000th of the department of Ariège.

The cadastral area of the town published by Insee, which serves as a reference in all statistics, is 1.87 km (1.16 mi).

=== Hydrography ===
The commune is in the watershed of the Garonne, within the Adour-Garonne watershed. It drains in the Caralet river, forming a hydrographic network 1 km (0.62 mi) in length.

== History ==
Ludiès is characteristic of the complexity of co-lordships in the Middle Ages. Thus, the Rigaud de Vaudreuil in particular, apart from their seigneury of Trémoulet and a quarter of that of Carlaret, were also half co-lords of Ludiès and Saint-Amadou, it being understood that the other half belonged in joint possession to the King of France, and the other to the Abbey of Saint-Antonin in Pamiers, under the condition of continuing to honor the abbey with a live sparrowhawk on Saint-Antonin's Day.

== Politics and administration ==
=== Territorial division ===
The commune of Ludiès is a member of the community of communes called "Portes d'Ariège Pyrénées", an inter communal organization headquartered in Pamiers. It is also a member of other intercommunal groups.

Administratively, it belongs to the Ariegè department and arrondissement of Pamiers.

Electorally it is under the canton of Pamiers-2 for electing departmental councillors since the 2015 cantonal rewriting, and the Ariegè second constituency for legislative elections since they were last redrawn in 1986.

Since February 2005, the mayor has been Danielle Bouché, of the Divers gauche party, characteristic of central Occitanie's socialist tendencies.

== Population and demographics ==
Historical population
Year	Pop.	±% p.a.
1968	46	—
1975	41	−1.63%
1982	33	−3.05%
1990	43	+3.36%
1999	49	+1.46%
2007	67	+3.99%
2012	72	+1.45%
2017	90	+4.56%
2023	102	+2.11%
Source: INSEE

== See also ==
- Communes of the Ariège department
