= Pamiers–Limoux railway =

Railway line in France

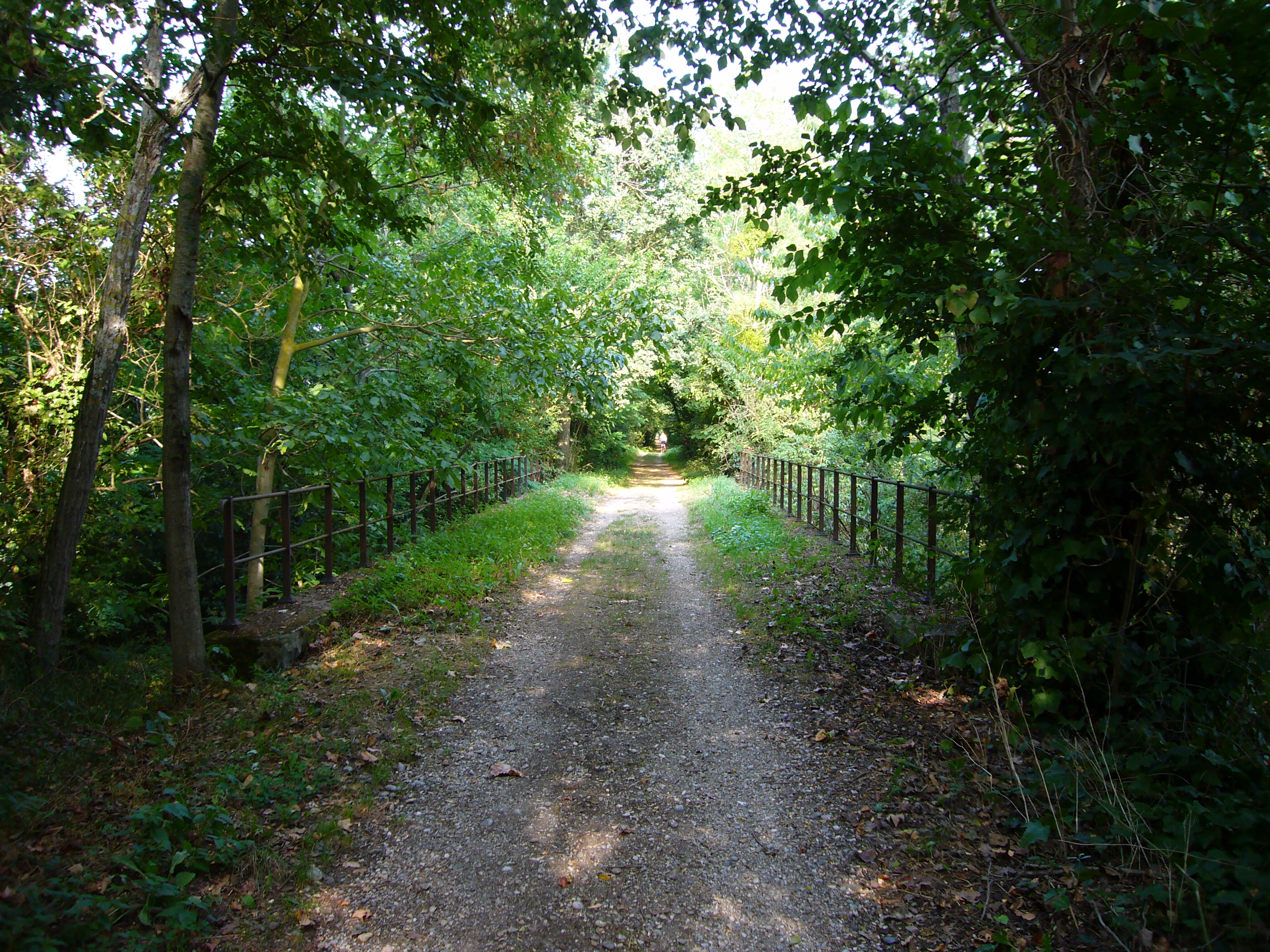
- Old railway line near Saint-Amadou

Overview
- Native name: Ligne de Pamiers à Limoux
- Owner: Midi (1883 – 1937); SNCF (1938 – 1975); Unclassified (since 1975)
- Line number: 673 000
- Locale: Aude; Ariège
- Termini: Pamiers; Limoux

History
- Opened: 1898
- Closed: 1939 – 1941

Technical
- Line length: 63.1 km (39.2 mi)
- Number of tracks: Formerly single tracked
- Track gauge: 1,435 mm (4 ft 8 1/2 in) standard gauge
- Electrification: None
- Maximum incline: 15 %

The railway line between Pamiers and Limoux (French: Ligne de Pamiers à Limoux) is a former French 63.1 km railway located in the departments of the Aude and Ariège. Built by the Compagnie des chemins de fer du Midi the line opened in two stages in 1898 and had its last section closed in 1973. The line branched from the Portet-Saint-Simon–Puigcerdà railway at Pamiers station and rejoined the Carcassonne–Rivesaltes railway at Limoux station.

It consisted of line 673 000 of the réseau ferré national.

== History ==
The law of 17 July 1879 (Freycinet Plan) classified 181 railway lines as being in general interest, with number 163 being between "d'un point à déterminer entre Pamiers et Saint-Antoine-de-Foix à un autre point à déterminer entre Limoux et Quillan". The line was thereafter deemed a public utility on 23 August 1881. It was granted to the Compagnie des Chemins de Fer du Midi by a contract signed by the Minister of Public Works and the company on 9 June 1883. The contract was approved with a law on 20 November 1883.

Construction on the railway line began in 1892, and the line was opened on 1 January 1898 (between Mirepoix and Limoux) and 20 November 1898 (between Pamiers and Mirepoix).

=== Dates removed from service ===
The railway line was removed from service in three steps:

- The sections from Le Carlaret to Mirepoix (KP 72.100 to 89.363) and Belvèze to Limoux (KP 111.010 to 127.5XX) on 30 November 1941.
- The section from Pamiers to Le Carlaret (KP 65.076 to 72.100), of which the track was removed by the Germans in 1944, on 12 November 1954.
- The section from Mirepoix to Belvèze (KP 89.363 to 111.010), which had remained open to freight service until 1973, on 24 February 1975.

== Current state ==
Beginning in 2007, the Conseil Départemental de l'Ariège undertook the transformation of the railway between Mirepoix and Moulin-Neuf into a voie verte. Together with the former Moulin-Neuf–Lavelanet railway, also transformed into voie verte, the railway makes up the 38km Chemin des Filatiers.
