= Molandier =

Commune in Occitanie, France

- Commune
- Coat of arms
- Location of Molandier
- Location within France Location within Occitanie
- Coordinates: 43°14′50″N 1°42′59″E
- Country: France
- Region: Occitania
- Department: Aude
- Arrondissement: Carcassonne
- Canton: La Piège au Razès
- Intercommunality: Piège Lauragais Malepère

Government
  - Mayor (2020–2026): Olivier Jullin
- Area^{1}: 19.84 km^{2} (7.66 sq mi)
- Elevation: 200 m (660 ft)
- Highest elevation: 351 m (1,152 ft)
- Lowest elevation: 226 m (741 ft)
- Population (2023): 252
  - Density: 12.7/km^{2} (32.9/sq mi)
- Time zone: UTC+01:00 (CET)
  - Summer (DST): UTC+02:00 (CEST)
- INSEE/Postal code: 11236 /11420
- ^{1} French Land Register data, which excludes lakes, ponds, glaciers > 1 km^{2} (0.386 sq mi or 247 acres) and river estuaries.

Molandier (French pronunciation: [mɔlɑ̃dje]; Occitan: Molandièr) is a commune in the Aude department in southern France. The main town is a bastide located on the old highway 624 between Castelnaudary and Le Vernet.

== History ==
The first record of Molandier is found in the thirteenth century when, on 1 April 1246, a charter of Customs Molandier was signed between lords and count. The charter defined the geographical boundaries of the region and the feudal rights of the lords as well as including a system of property boundaries and rules for civil and criminal justice, police and consular organization.

The territory of Molandier was larger in the thirteenth century than nowadays. The limits were defined by streams and a river, the bright-Hers. The stream Grilosa (today Durgou) marked the southern boundary. This creek flows into Hers around Marrot. The western boundary was represented by the stream of Pounchuc (Roquefort today) on the old road to Calmont Mazères. The northeast boundary is the death-Hers. The stream of Garrigou (near La Borde du Bosc) separates Molandier and Belper . The passage between the villages was called the No carbe (goat).

== Population ==
Historical population
Year	Pop.	±% p.a.
1968	345	—
1975	263	−3.80%
1982	256	−0.38%
1990	218	−1.99%
1999	213	−0.26%
2007	215	+0.12%
2012	230	+1.36%
2017	237	+0.60%
2023	252	+1.03%
Source: INSEE

== See also ==
- Communes of the Aude department
