= Loures—Barbazan station =

Railway station in Loures-Barousse, France

Coordinates: 43°01′15″N 0°36′39″E

Loures—Barbazan station (French: Gare de Loures—Barbazan) is a railway station in Loures-Barousse, Occitanie, France. As its name suggests, the station also served the nearby commune of Barbazan. The station is on the Montréjeau–Luchon railway line.

== Train services ==
Since 18 November 2014, no trains have called at the station due to poor track infrastructure. After restoration of the Montréjeau–Luchon railway, passenger services were restarted on 22 June 2025 with 6 daily return trips.

Preceding station	TER Occitanie	Following station
Montréjeau–Gourdan-Polignan Terminus	14	Saléchan-Siradan towards Luchon
