= Henri Filhol =

French medical doctor, malacologist and naturalist

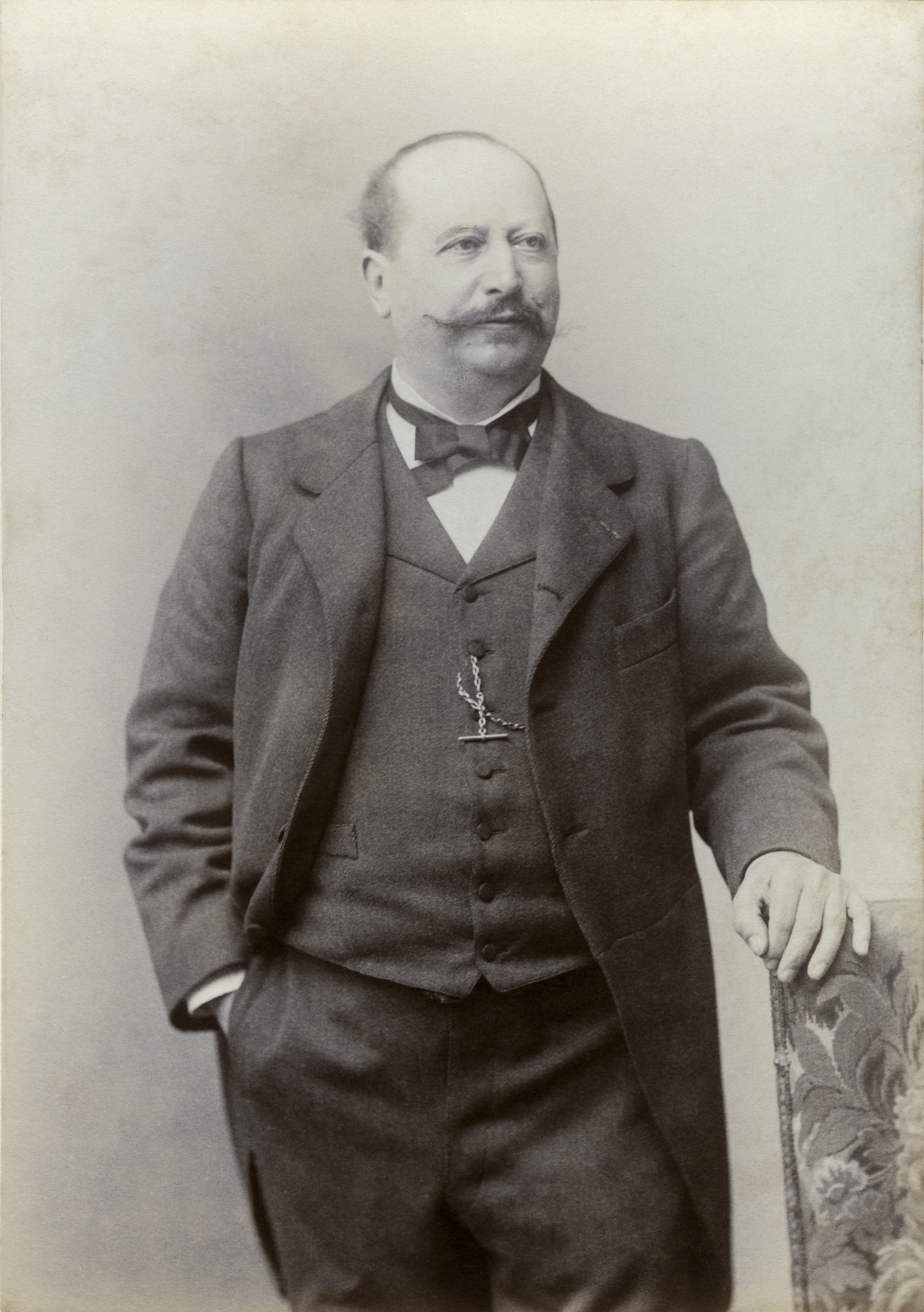
- Born: 13 May 1843; Toulouse, France
- Died: 28 April 1902 (aged 58); France
- Scientific career
- Fields: Malacology; Natural history; Zoology; Paleontology
- Workplaces: University of Toulouse; Muséum national d'Histoire naturelle
- Author abbrev. (zoology): Filhol

Henri Filhol (13 May 1843 – 28 April 1902) was a French medical doctor, malacologist and naturalist born in Toulouse. He was the son of Édouard Filhol (1814-1883), curator of the Muséum de Toulouse.

After receiving his early education in Toulouse, he moved to Paris, where he obtained doctorates in medicine and science. In 1879 he was appointed professor of zoology at the Faculty of Toulouse. From 1894 to 1902 he occupied the chair of comparative animal anatomy at the Muséum national d'Histoire naturelle in Paris. In 1897 he became a member of the Académie des sciences.

In the field of paleontology, he performed important studies of fossilized mammals in the phosphorites in Quercy.

Filhol served as the expedition doctor and naturalist on the French 1874 Transit of Venus Expedition to Campbell Island, with Filhol Peak on the island being named after him. In 1883 with Alphonse Milne-Edwards, Léon Vaillant, Edmond Perrier and others, he embarked on a scientific journey aboard the Talisman.

The ghost shrimp Filhollianassa filholi was named in honor of Filhol.

== Filhol's Collection in the Muséum de Toulouse ==
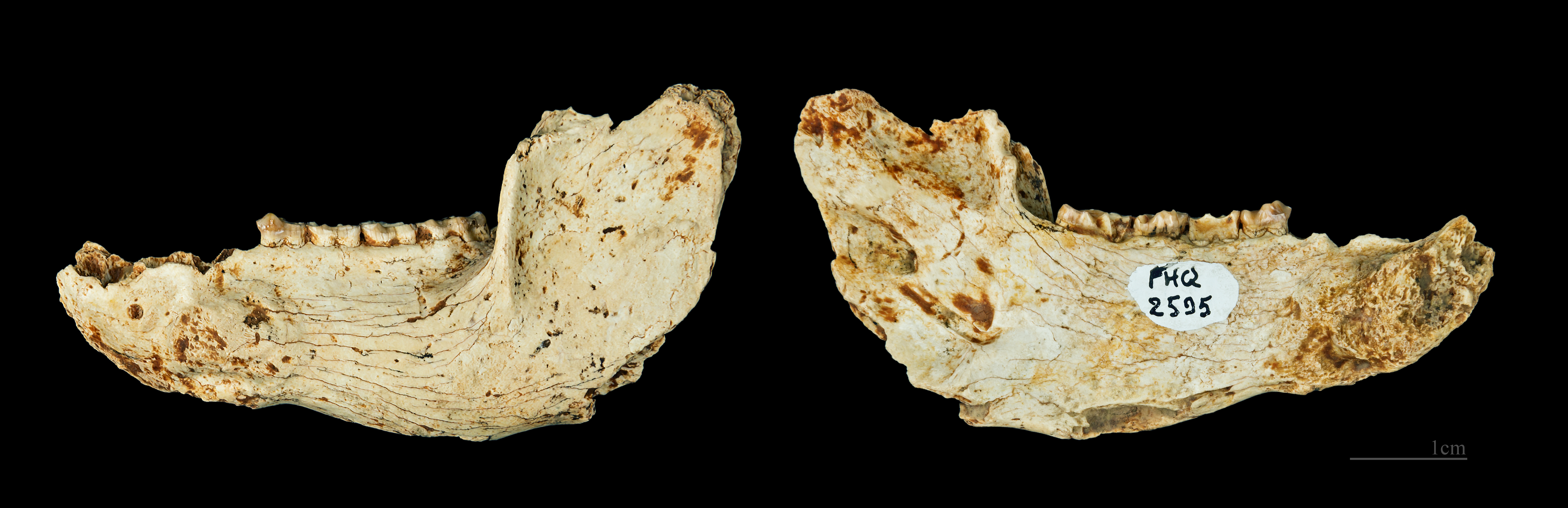
Adapis parisiensis

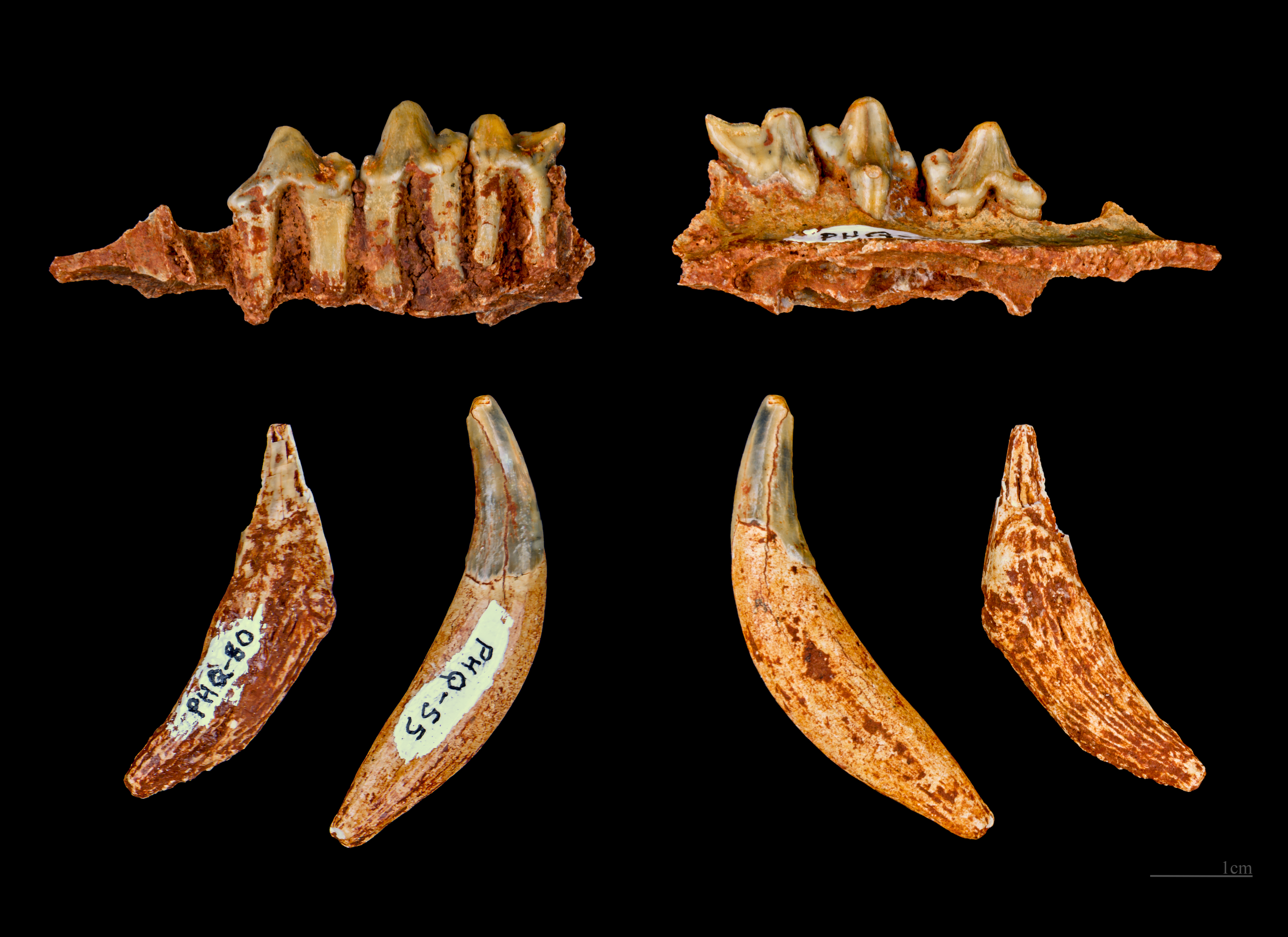
Hyaenodon filholi

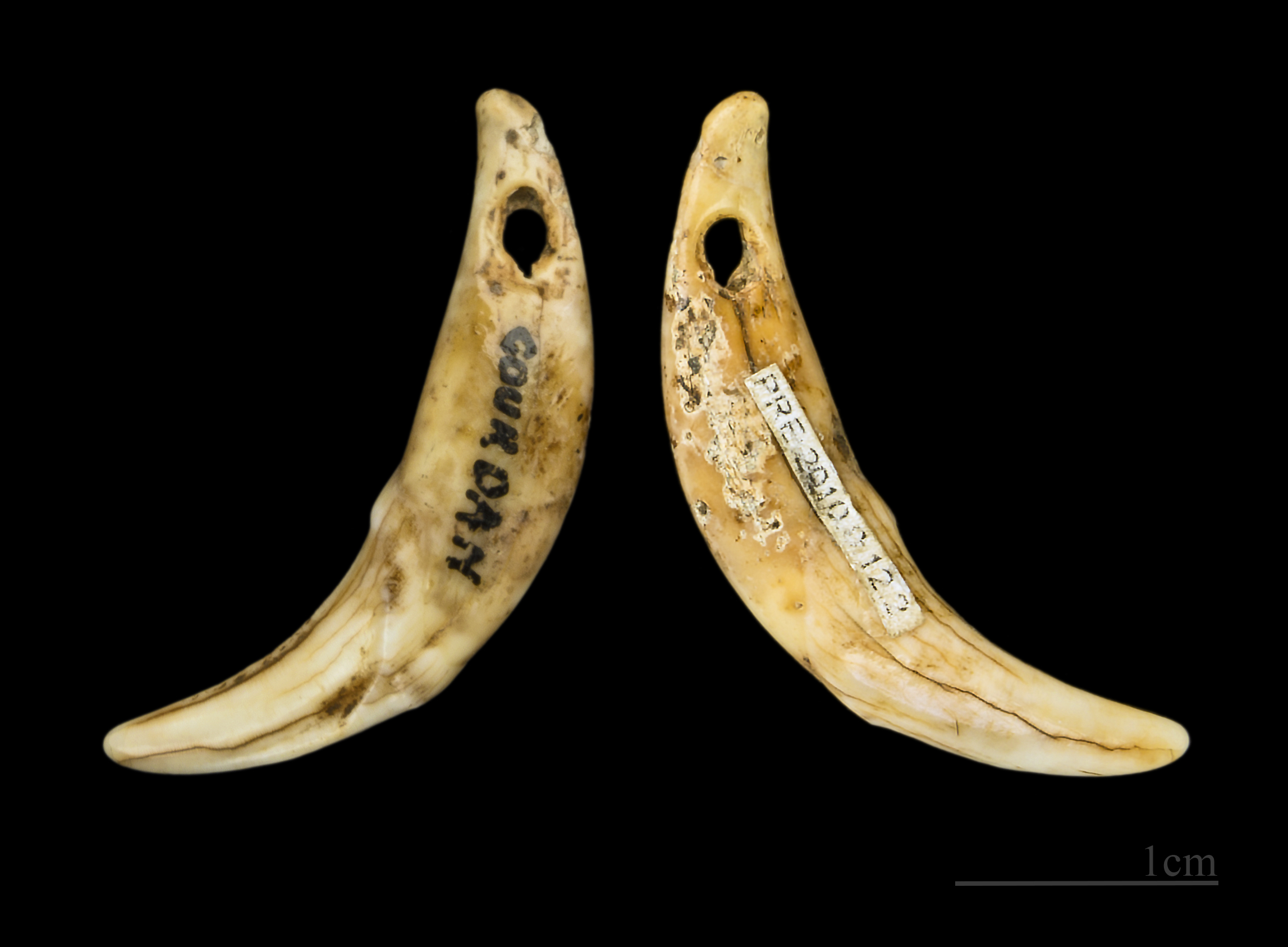
Wolf Canine adornment Magdalenian Gourdan-Polignan

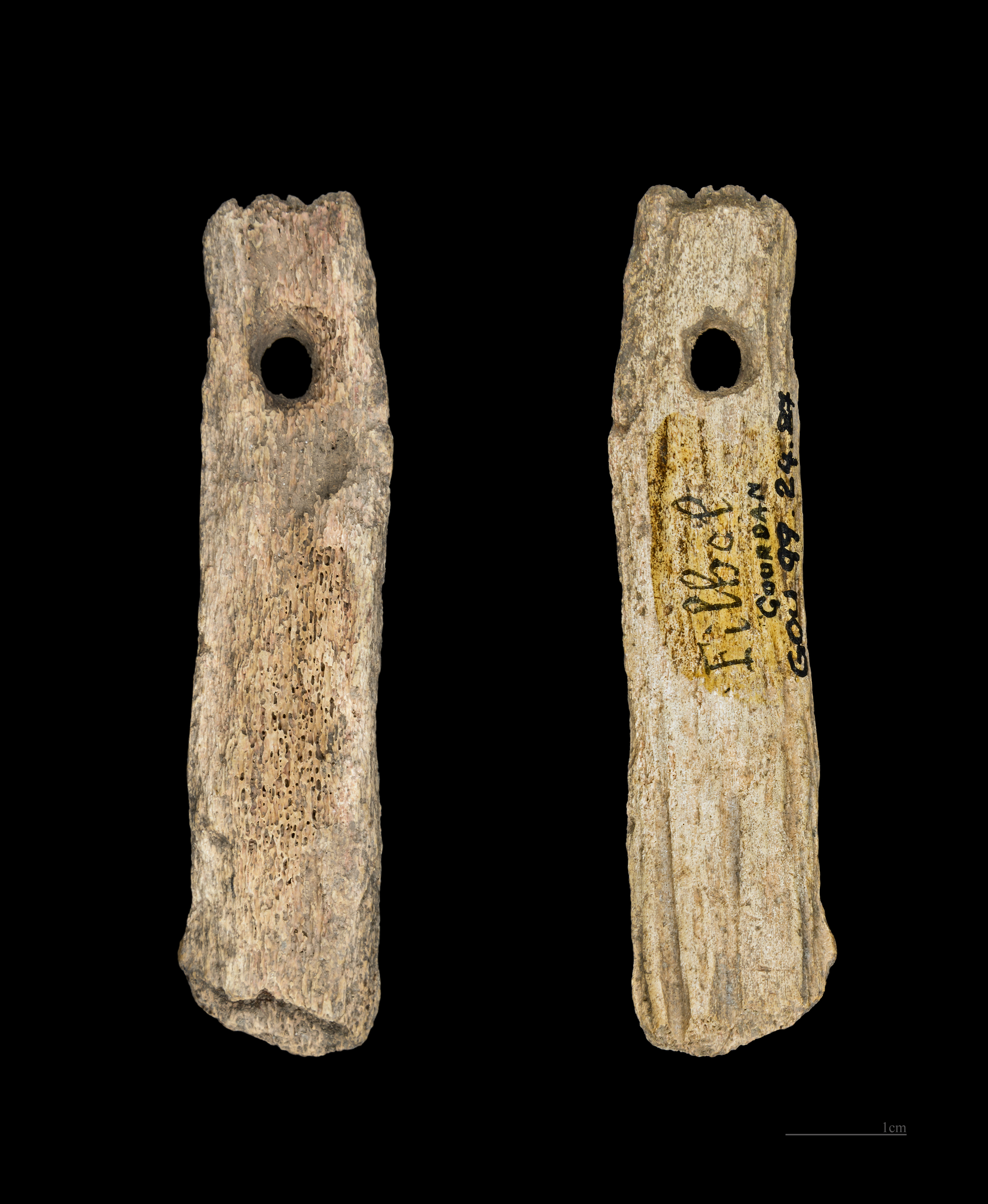
Pendant in reindeer antlers Gourdan-Polignan
