= Saint-Gaudens station =

Railway station in France

Saint-Gaudens
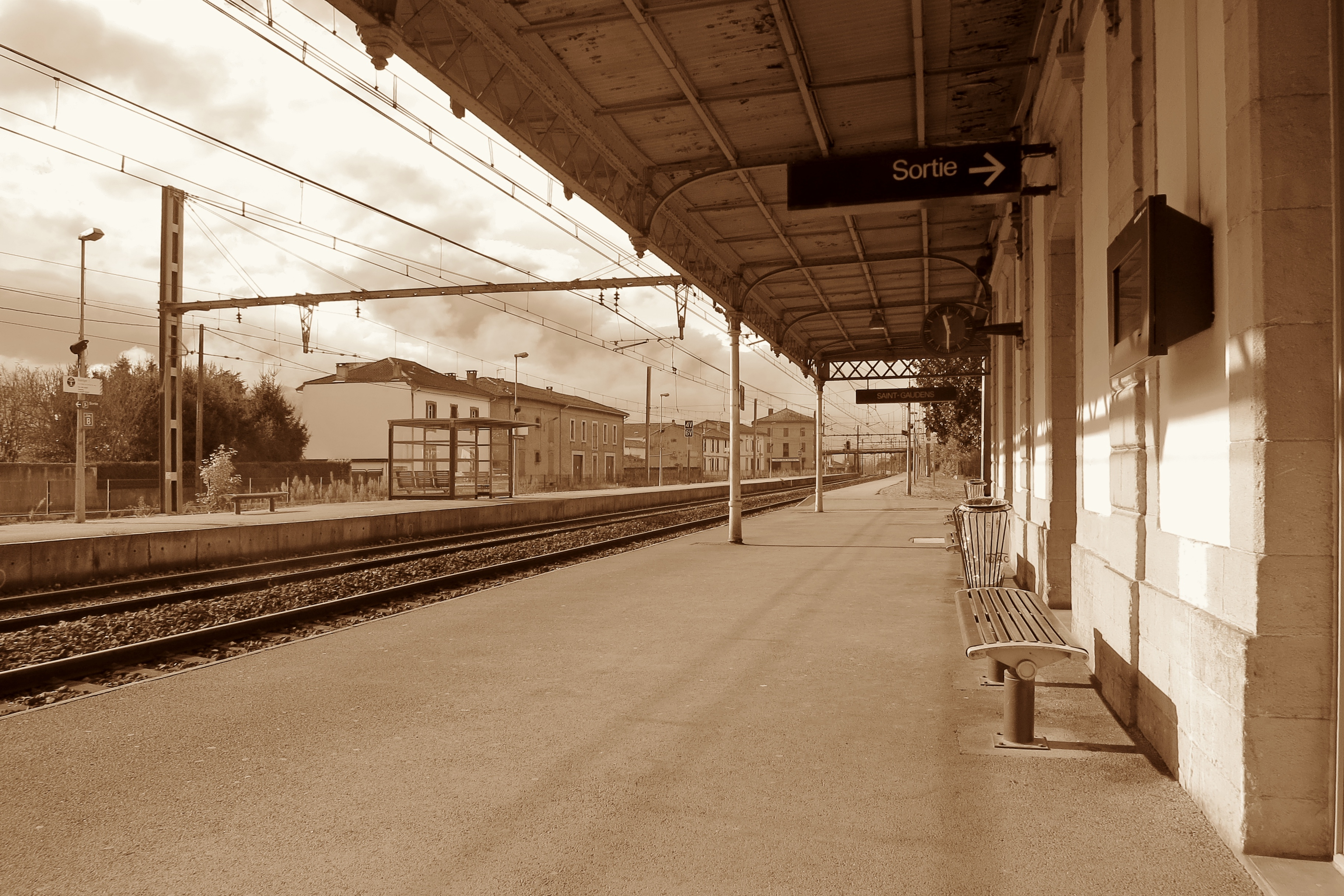
- Saint-Gaudens railway station

General information
- Location: Rue Victor Bougues 31800; Saint-Gaudens, Haute-Garonne, Occitanie, France
- Coordinates: 43.105°N 0.7303°E
- Elevation: 371 m (1,217 ft)
- Owner: RFF / SNCF
- Operator: SNCF
- Line: Toulouse–Bayonne railway
- Platforms: 2
- Tracks: 4

Other information
- Station code: 87611137

History
- Opened: 9 June 1862

Services
Preceding station	SNCF	Following station
Montréjeau–Gourdan-Polignan towards Hendaye	Intercités	Toulouse Terminus
Preceding station	TER Occitanie	Following station
Montréjeau–Gourdan-Polignan towards Pau	15	Saint-Martory towards Toulouse
Location

The gare de Saint-Gaudens is a railway station in Saint-Gaudens, Occitanie, France. The station is located on the Toulouse–Bayonne railway line. The station is served by Intercités (long distance) and TER (local) services operated by the SNCF.

== Train services ==
The following services currently call at Saint-Gaudens:

- intercity services (Intercités) Hendaye–Bayonne–Pau–Tarbes–Toulouse
- local service (TER Occitanie) Toulouse–Saint-Gaudens–Tarbes–Pau
