= Saverdun station =

Railway station in Saverdun, France

Saverdun

General information
- Location: Saverdun, Ariège, Occitanie; France
- Coordinates: 43°14′22″N 1°34′13″E
- Line: Portet-Saint-Simon–Puigcerdà railway
- Platforms: 2

Other information
- Station code: 87611368

History
- Opened: 19 October 1861

Services
Preceding station	SNCF	Following station
Auterive towards Paris-Austerlitz	Intercités (night)	Pamiers towards Latour-de-Carol
Preceding station	TER Occitanie	Following station
Cintegabelle towards Toulouse	11	Le Vernet-d'Ariège towards Latour-de-Carol
Location
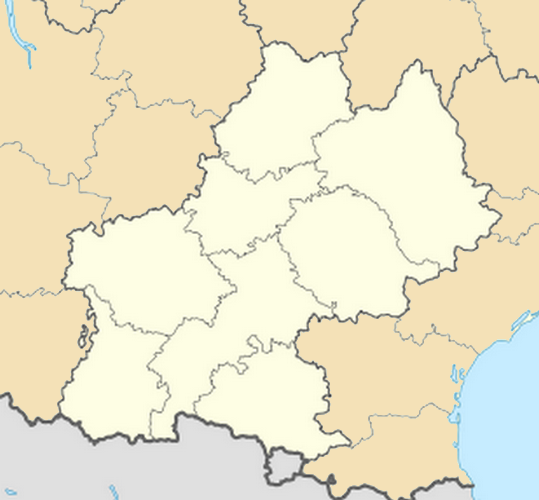
- Location within Midi-Pyrénées Location within France

Saverdun is a railway station in Saverdun, Occitanie, France. The station is on the Portet-Saint-Simon–Puigcerdà railway. The station is served by TER (local) services and Intercités de nuit night services operated by the SNCF.

== Train services ==
The following services currently call at Saverdun:

- night service (Intercités de nuit) Paris–Toulouse–Pamiers–Latour-de-Carol
- local service (TER Occitanie) Toulouse–Foix–Latour-de-Carol-Enveitg
