= Le Vernet-d'Ariège station =

Railway station in Le Vernet, France

Le Vernet-d'Ariège

General information
- Location: Le Vernet, Ariège, Occitanie; France
- Coordinates: 43°11′21″N 1°36′41″E
- Line: Portet-Saint-Simon–Puigcerdà railway
- Platforms: 1
- Tracks: 1

Other information
- Station code: 87611350

History
- Opened: 19 October 1861

Services
Preceding station	TER Occitanie	Following station
Saverdun towards Toulouse	11	Pamiers towards Latour-de-Carol
Location
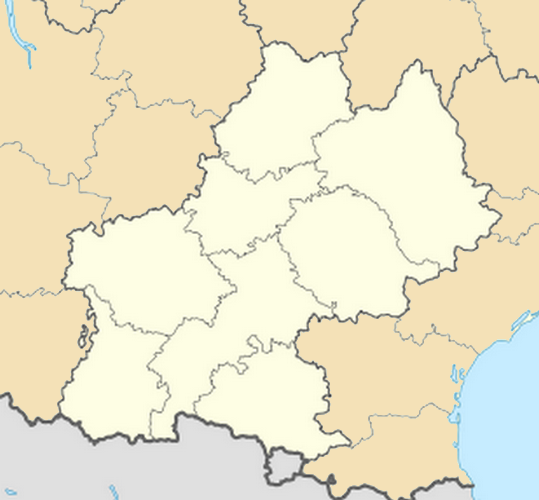
- Location within Midi-Pyrénées Location within France

Le Vernet-d'Ariège is a railway station in Le Vernet, Occitanie, France. The station is on the Portet-Saint-Simon–Puigcerdà railway. The station is served by TER (local) services operated by the SNCF.

== Train services ==
The following services currently call at Le Vernet-d'Ariège:

- local service (TER Occitanie) Toulouse–Foix–Latour-de-Carol-Enveitg
