= Filhollianassa =

Scientific classification
- Kingdom: Animalia
- Phylum: Arthropoda
- Clade: Pancrustacea
- Class: Malacostraca
- Order: Decapoda
- Suborder: Pleocyemata
- Family: Callianassidae
- Genus: Filhollianassa; Poore, Dworschak, Robles, Mantelatto & Felder, 2019

Ggenus of crustaceans

Filhollianassa is a genus of decapods in the family Callianassidae.

== Species ==
There are two species recognized in this genus:

- Filhollianassa ceramica (Fulton & Grant, 1906)
- Filhollianassa filholi (A.Milne-Edwards, 1879)
