= Pamiers station =

Railway station in Pamiers, France

Pamiers
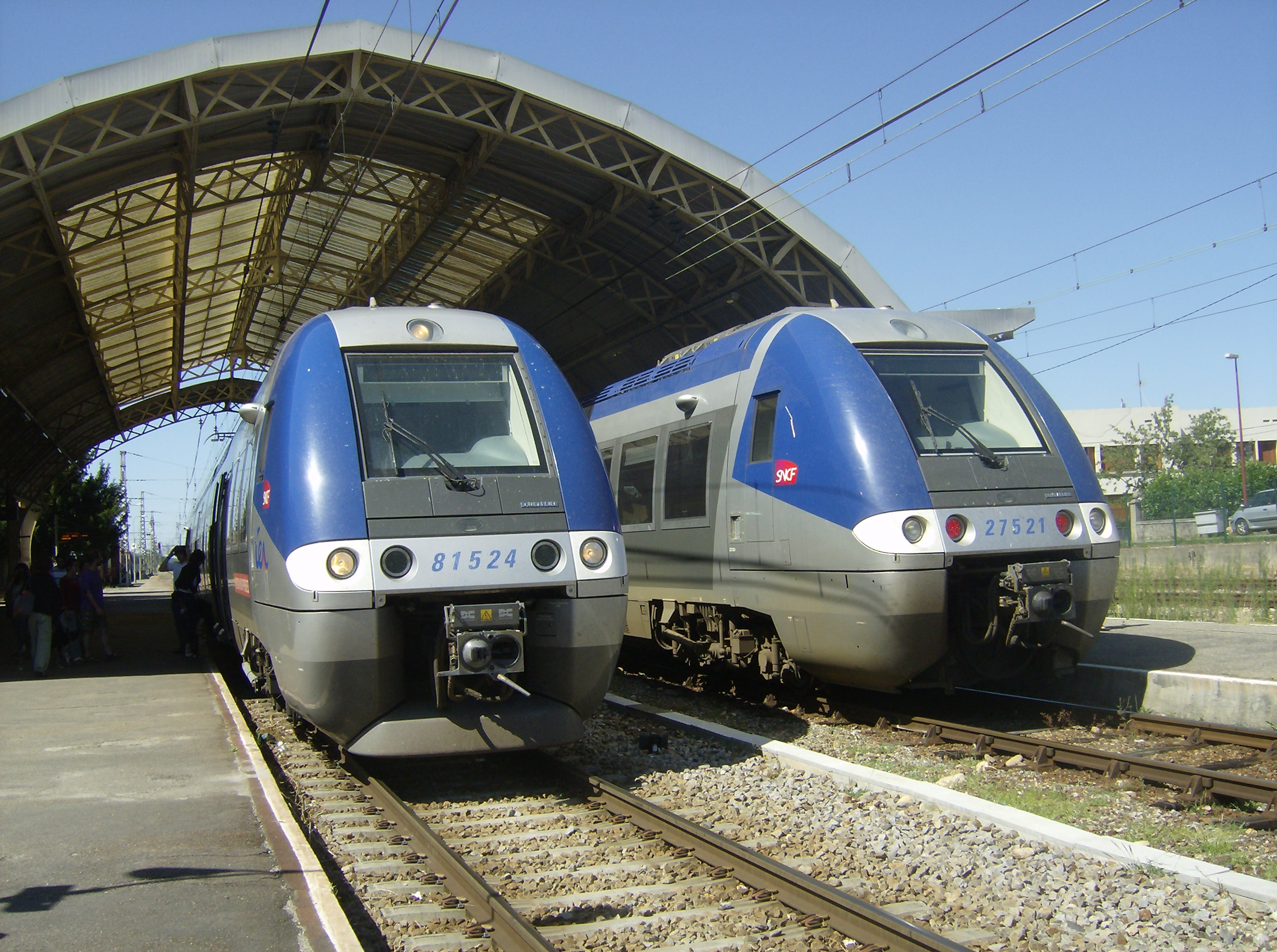
- Pamiers railway station

General information
- Location: Pamiers, Ariège, Occitanie; France
- Coordinates: 43°06′58″N 01°37′10″E
- Elevation: 298 m (978 ft)
- Owner: SNCF
- Operator: SNCF
- Lines: Portet-Saint-Simon–Puigcerdà railway Pamiers–Limoux railway (closed)
- Distance: 64.220 km
- Platforms: 2
- Tracks: 6

Other information
- Station code: 87611343

History
- Opened: 19 October 1861; 164 years ago

Services
Preceding station	SNCF	Following station
Saverdun towards Paris-Austerlitz	Intercités (night)	Foix towards Latour-de-Carol
Preceding station	TER Occitanie	Following station
Le Vernet-d'Ariège towards Toulouse	11	Varilhes towards Latour-de-Carol
Location
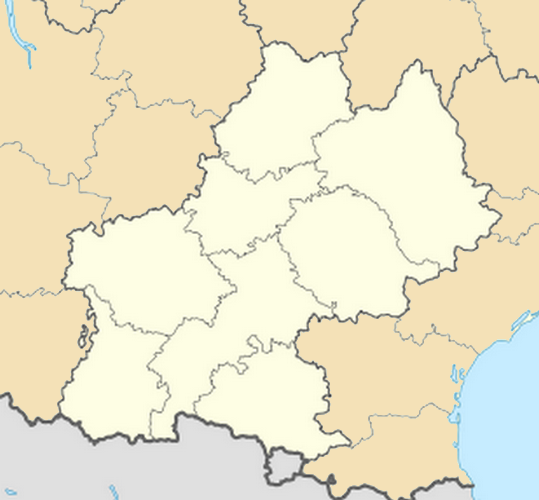
- Location within Midi-Pyrénées Location within France

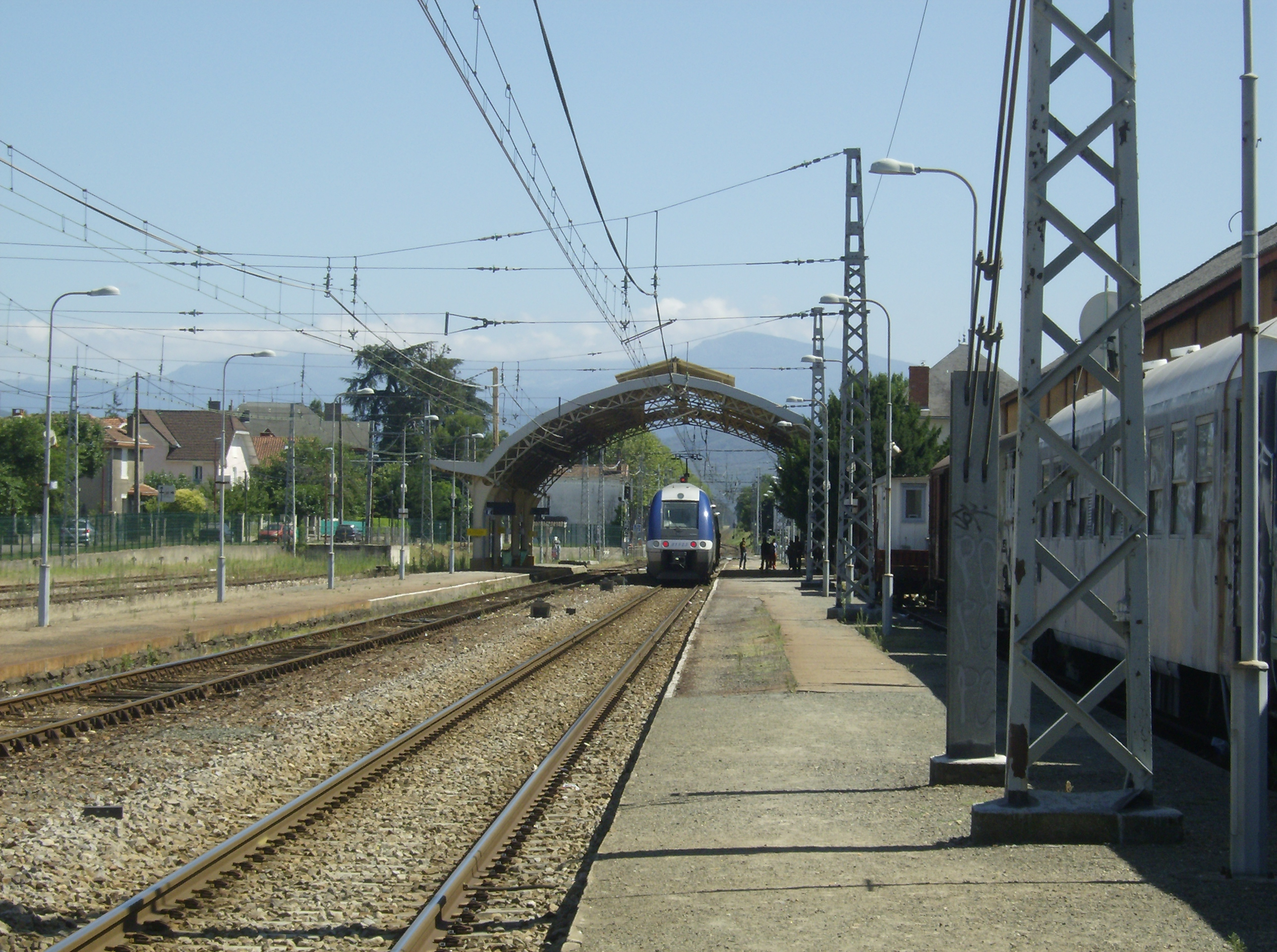
A train waiting in the station.

Pamiers station (French: Gare de Pamiers) is a railway station in Pamiers, Occitanie, France. The station is served by TER (local) services and Intercités de nuit night services operated by SNCF.

The station is located at kilometric point (KP) 64.220 on the Portet-Saint-Simon–Puigcerdà railway, between the open stations of Le Vernet-d'Ariège and Varilhes. The station was also the origin and branch location of the now closed Pamiers–Limoux railway.

== History ==
It was built by the Chemins de fer du Midi on 19 October 1861 and was the terminus of the line until it was extended to Foix on 7 April 1862. The station used to be a junction onto the now closed Pamiers–Limoux railway from November 1898 to 1939.

The station gained its room in 1903 and the line was electrified in 1927.

== Train services ==
The station is served by the following services:

- Night train (Intercités de nuit) Paris–Pamiers–Latour-de-Carol
- Regional services (TER Occitanie) Toulouse–Foix–Latour-de-Carol-Enveitg
