= Swanne Gauthier =

French basketball player

Swanne Gauthier (born 6 August 1986 in Pamiers) is a French basketball player who played for top French league Ligue Féminine de Basketball clubs Tarbes during the 2002–2003 season and Toulouse Metropole Basket during the 2009–2010 season.
