= Cintegabelle station =

Railway station in Occitanie, France

Cintegabelle
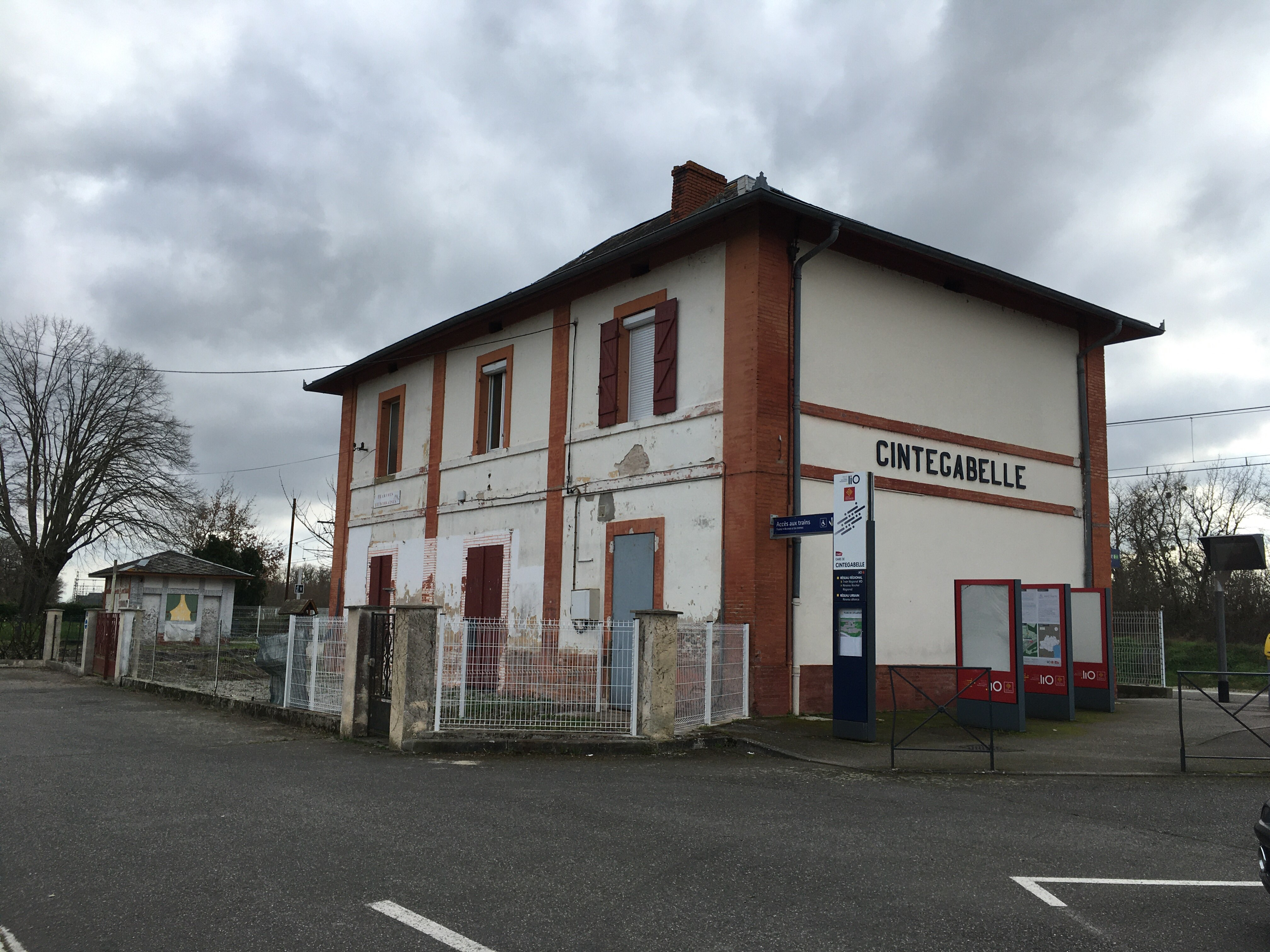
- Cintegabelle railway station

General information
- Location: Cintegabelle, Haute-Garonne, Occitanie, France
- Coordinates: 43°18′19″N 1°31′14″E
- Line: Portet-Saint-Simon–Puigcerdà railway
- Platforms: 1
- Tracks: 1

Other information
- Station code: 87611376

History
- Opened: 19 October 1861

Services
Preceding station	TER Occitanie	Following station
Auterive towards Toulouse	11	Saverdun towards Latour-de-Carol
Location

Cintegabelle is a railway station in Cintegabelle, Occitanie, France. The station is located on the Portet-Saint-Simon–Puigcerdà railway. The station is served by TER (local) services operated by the SNCF.

== Train services ==
The following services currently call at Cintegabelle:

- local service (TER Occitanie) Toulouse – Foix – Latour-de-Carol-Enveitg
