= La Tour-du-Crieu =

Commune in Occitanie, France

- Commune
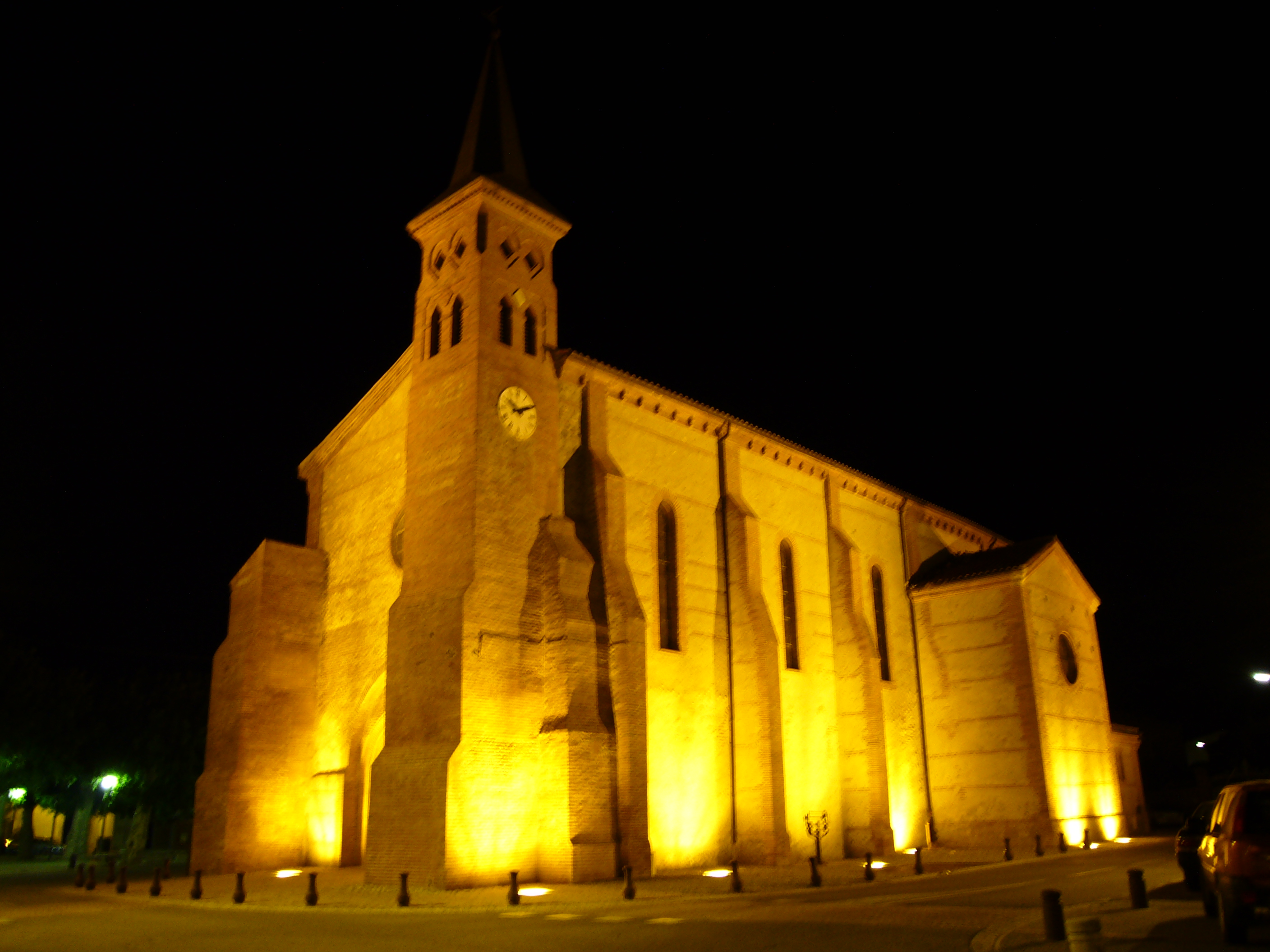
- The church in La Tour-du-Crieu

- Coat of arms
- Location of La Tour-du-Crieu
- Location within France Location within Occitanie
- Coordinates: 43°06′17″N 1°39′18″E
- Country: France
- Region: Occitania
- Department: Ariège
- Arrondissement: Pamiers
- Canton: Pamiers-2

Government
  - Mayor (2023–2026): Sophie Bayard
- Area^{1}: 10.28 km^{2} (3.97 sq mi)
- Elevation: 310 m (1,020 ft)
- Highest elevation: 341 m (1,119 ft)
- Lowest elevation: 297 m (974 ft)
- Population (2023): 3,230
  - Density: 314/km^{2} (814/sq mi)
- Time zone: UTC+01:00 (CET)
  - Summer (DST): UTC+02:00 (CEST)
- INSEE/Postal code: 09312 /09100
- ^{1} French Land Register data, which excludes lakes, ponds, glaciers > 1 km^{2} (0.386 sq mi or 247 acres) and river estuaries.

La Tour-du-Crieu (French pronunciation: [la tuʁ dy kʁijø]; Occitan: La Tor del Criu) is a commune in the Ariège department in southwestern France.

== Population ==
Inhabitants of La Tour-du-Crieu are called Critouriens in French.

Historical population
Year	Pop.	±% p.a.
1968	745	—
1975	1,162	+6.56%
1982	1,640	+5.05%
1990	2,011	+2.58%
1999	1,978	−0.18%
2007	2,333	+2.08%
2012	2,863	+4.18%
2017	3,167	+2.04%
2023	3,230	+0.33%
Source: INSEE

== See also ==
- Communes of the Ariège department
