= Montréjeau–Gourdan-Polignan station =

Railway station in Gourdan-Polignan, France

Coordinates: 43°04′39″N 0°34′27″E

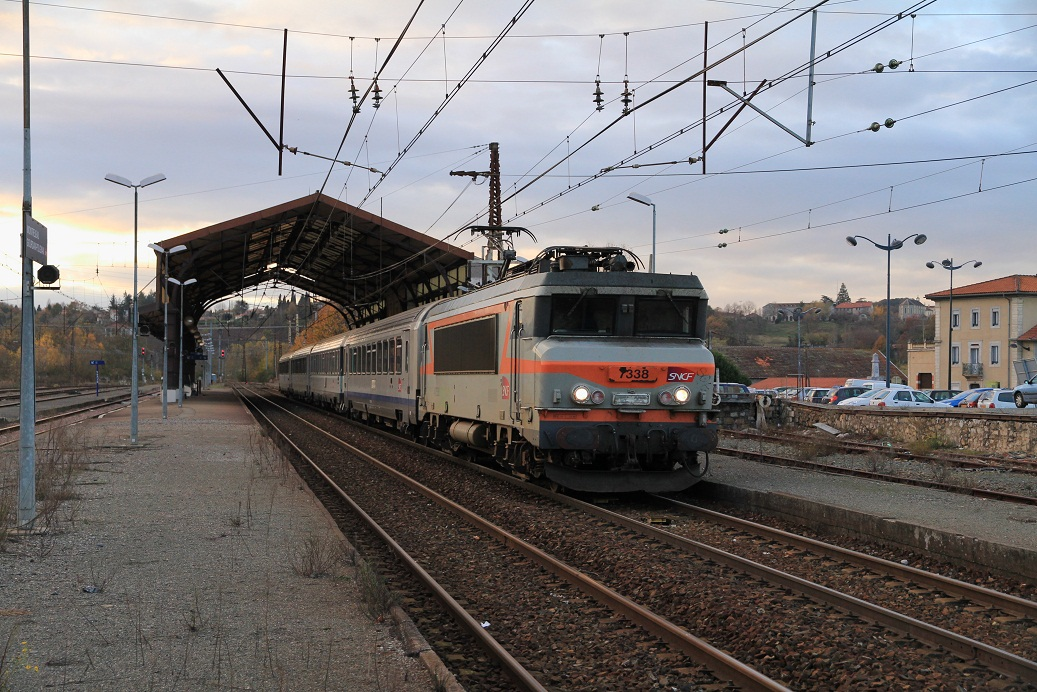
Montréjeau station

Montréjeau or Montréjeau-Gourdan-Polignan is a railway station in Gourdan-Polignan, Occitanie, France. The station opened on 9 June 1862 and is located on the Toulouse – Bayonne and the Montréjeau–Luchon railway lines. The station is served by Intercités (long distance) and TER (local) services operated by the SNCF.

== Train services ==
The following services currently call at Montréjeau:

- intercity services (Intercités) Hendaye–Bayonne–Pau–Tarbes–Toulouse
- local service (TER Occitanie) Toulouse–Saint-Gaudens–Tarbes–Pau
- local service (TER Occitanie) Montréjeau–Luchon

Preceding station	SNCF	Following station
Lannemezan towards Hendaye	Intercités	Saint-Gaudens towards Toulouse
Preceding station	TER Occitanie	Following station
Terminus	14	Loures-Barbazan towards Luchon
Lannemezan towards Pau	15	Saint-Gaudens towards Toulouse
