= Auterive station =

Railway station in Auterive, France

Auterive

General information
- Location: Auterive, Haute-Garonne, Occitanie, France
- Coordinates: 43°20′55″N 1°28′08″E
- Line: Portet-Saint-Simon–Puigcerdà railway
- Platforms: 2
- Tracks: 2

Other information
- Station code: 87611384

History
- Opened: 19 October 1861

Services
Preceding station	SNCF	Following station
Les Aubrais towards Paris-Austerlitz	Intercités (night)	Saverdun towards Latour-de-Carol
Preceding station	TER Occitanie	Following station
Venerque-le-Vernet towards Toulouse	11	Cintegabelle towards Latour-de-Carol
Location

Auterive is a railway station in Auterive, Occitanie, France. The station is on the Portet-Saint-Simon–Puigcerdà railway. The station is served by TER (local) services and Intercités de nuit night services operated by the SNCF.

== Train services ==
The following services currently call at Auterive:

- night service (Intercités de nuit) Paris–Pamiers–Latour-de-Carol
- local service (TER Occitanie) Toulouse–Foix–Latour-de-Carol-Enveitg
