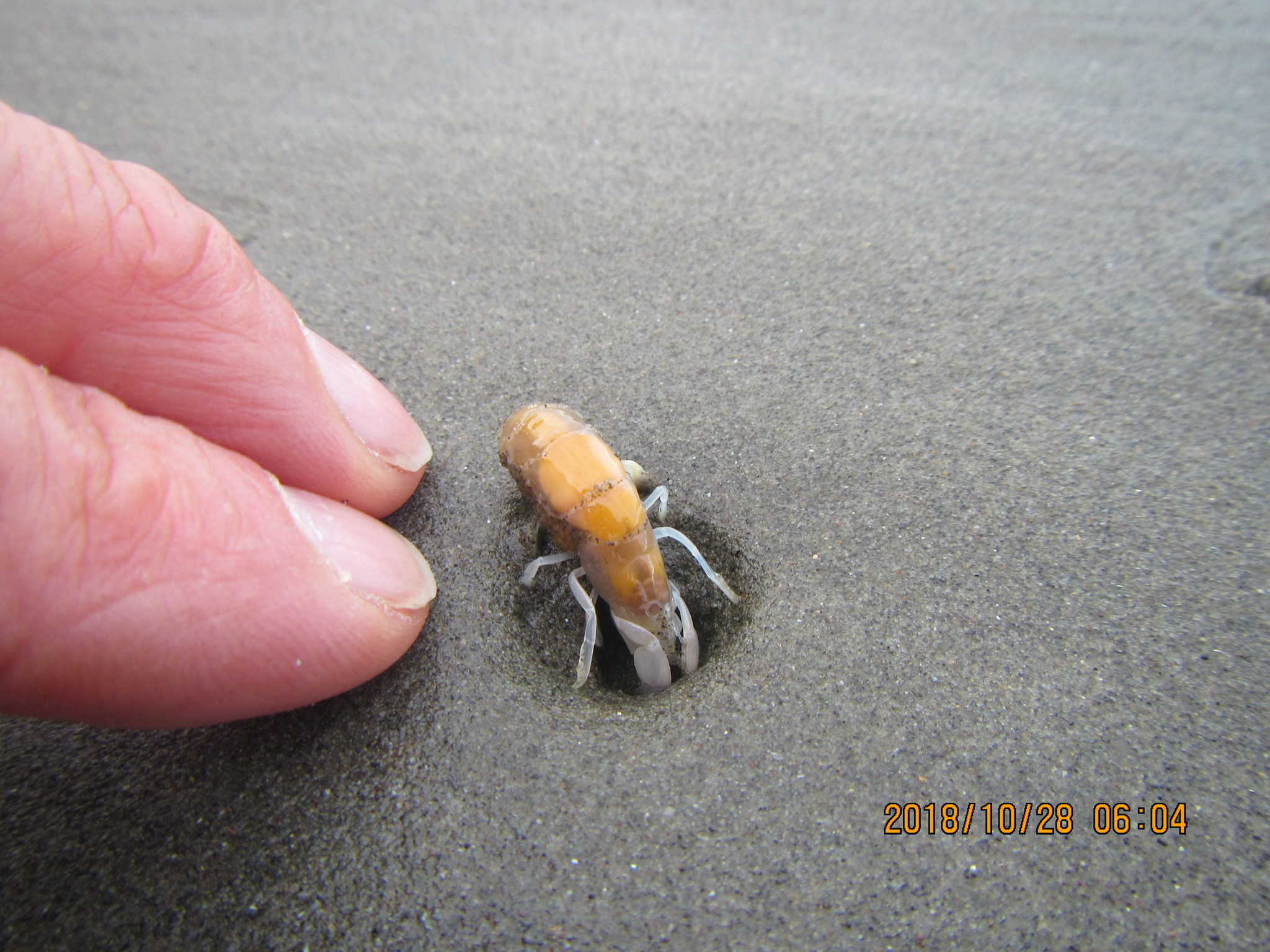
- F. filholi observed on Foxton Beach, North Island, New Zealand

Scientific classification
- Kingdom: Animalia
- Phylum: Arthropoda
- Clade: Pancrustacea
- Class: Malacostraca
- Order: Decapoda
- Suborder: Pleocyemata
- Family: Callianassidae
- Genus: Filhollianassa
- Species: F. filholi

Binomial name
- Filhollianassa filholi (A. Milne-Edwards, 1879)

Synonyms
- Callianassa filholi A. Milne-Edwards, 1879; Biffarius filholi (A. Milne-Edwards, 1879); Trypaea filholi (A. Milne-Edwards, 1879)

= Filhollianassa filholi =

Species of crustacean

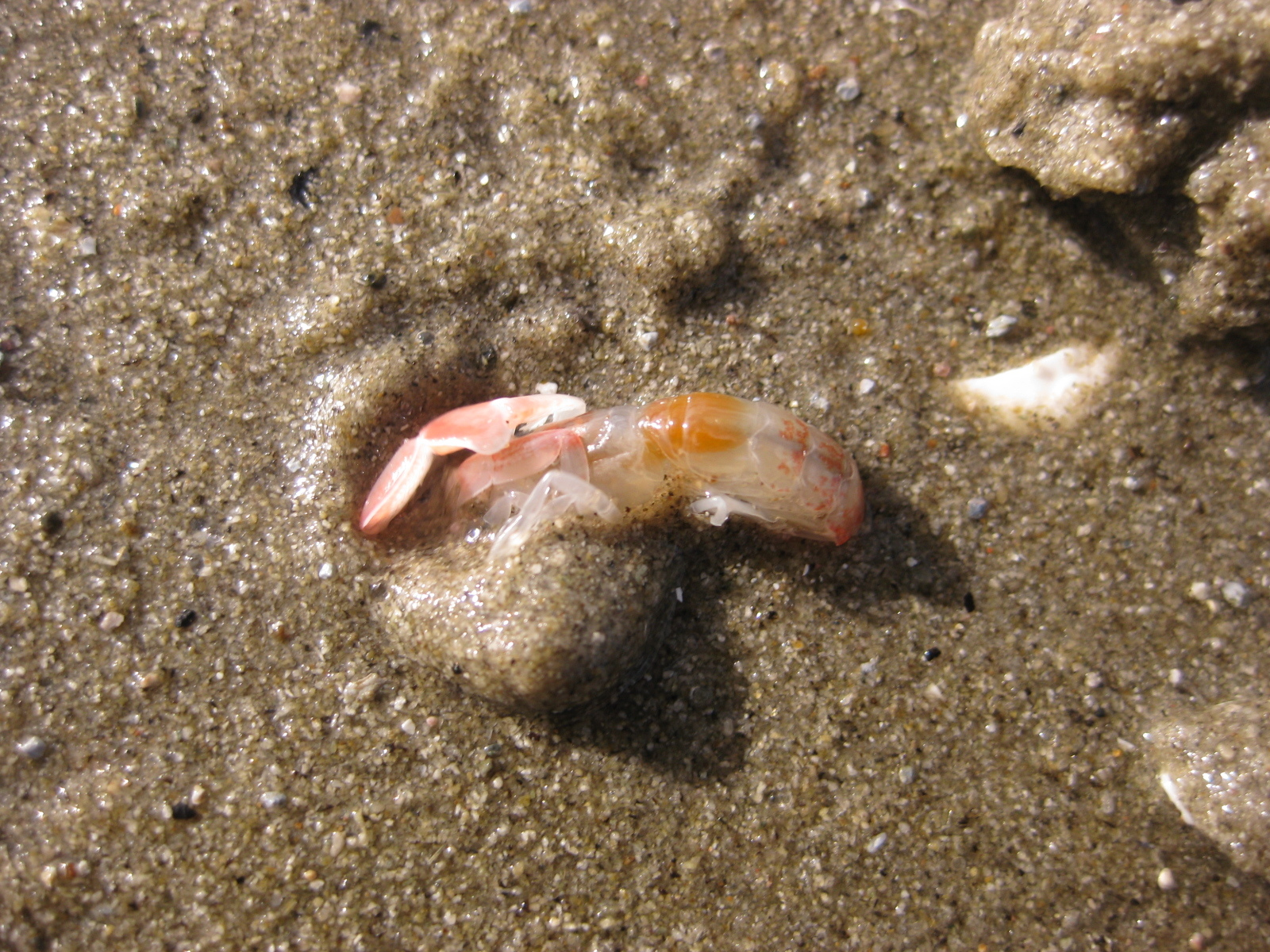
F. filholi observed in its native beach habitat near Bowentown, North Island, New Zealand

Filhollianassa filholi is a ghost shrimp of the family Callianassidae, endemic to New Zealand, which grows up to 60 mm (2.4 in) long. It was known as Biffarius filholi until a 2019 taxonomic revision of the group. It is also known as a yabby in Australia.

== Taxonomy and etymology ==
Filhollianassa filholi was originally described by Alphonse Milne-Edwards as Callianassa filholi A. Milne-Edwards, 1879.

== Identification ==
Growing up to 60 mm long, the ghost shrimp is typically pale, translucent, or whitish in color. The shrimp burrow into the sand and live underground. They have pleopods, which are flap-like abdominal appendages that can be used to move through the water and to burrow. The ghost shrimp also has a wide tail that can be used for stabilization. In males, one claw is larger than the other.

== Geographic distribution and habitat ==
Natural global range - This ghost shrimp is endemic to New Zealand.

New Zealand range - The ghost shrimp can only be found in New Zealand on protected, sandy, or muddy marine shores.

Habitat preferences – The ghost shrimp can commonly be found in mid and low tide zones and shallow sub tidal zones of protected shores with sandy substrate. They burrow into the sand, even sometimes doing somersaults. Their tunnels are U shaped with an inhalant tunnel and an exhalent tunnel. Ghost shrimp support mudflat health through bioturbation, which is the releasing of nutrients back into the system through the turning over of mud.

== Life cycle and phenology ==
For the ghost shrimp, reproduction and mating usually begins in spring to early summer (September-December in New Zealand). Male and female ghost shrimp use their burrow systems to interact. Fertilization is external as females brood eggs beneath their abdomen. Female ghost shrimp carry lots of eggs with their pleopods. Egg brooding lasts several weeks, depending on temperature. Females remain in their burrows at this time.

Eggs hatch into free-swimming larvae that feed on microscopic plankton. Ghost shrimp remain in the larval stage from days to weeks as the current disperses them. This will peak during the summer (December-February in New Zealand). They then begin to settle onto suitable sediments, such as mudflats and estuaries. The larvae metamorphose into juvenile shrimp and begin burrowing. This will happen around autumn (March - May in New Zealand). Growth continues as adults burrow through the winter, search for mates, and juveniles molt and create more complex burrows as they grow. Juveniles will reach maturity and begin mating within a couple of months to a year, depending on environmental conditions. These conditions can include temperature, sediment types, tides and currents, and food availability.

== Diet, prey, and predators ==
Diet and foraging - Ghost shrimp is primarily a deposit feeder, meaning it consumes sediment and extracts organic materials. Some of the organic material extracts from the sediment include detritus (decaying plant and animal matter), microalgae (especially benthic diatoms), and bacteria and microorganisms. The ghost shrimp uses its claws and mouthparts to collect sediment, sorts and ingests organic-rich fractions, and then expels the processed sediment as fecal mounds near burrow openings. Feeding tends to occur below the surface as they are burrowing. Ghost shrimp often forage more in warmer months.

Predators, Parasites, and Diseases - Despite spending most of their lives being hidden under the sand, ghost shrimp can still be an important prey item. Many fish eat them including flatfish and rays that excavate the sediment, drawing them out. There are some shorebirds that eat the ghost shrimp, which include the long-billed curlews, willets, oystercatchers, and other probing birds during low tide when the burrows are closer to the air. Some crabs can even invade burrows or capture exposed individuals. All of these predators tend to dig into the sand or suction feed in order to get to the burrowed shrimp. There are not many direct studies on parasites within ghost shrimp, but common parasites of other global ghost shrimp include bopyrid isopods, nematodes and protozoans. The biggest risk for diseases for crustaceans are bacterial infections from low-oxygen sediments. Pollution is also a factor for the health of these shrimp.

== Other information ==
It was named after Henri Filhol, who collected specimens of it from Stewart Island, New Zealand.

Etymology: The 'Filhol' in the genus and species is named in honor of Henri Filhol, a french naturalist, paleontologist and zoologist who significantly contributed to the study of crustaceans. The '-ianassa' in the genus is a common suffix used for genera within the family Callianaddidea which comes from the Greek 'lovely queen.'
