= Gourdan-Polignan =

- Commune
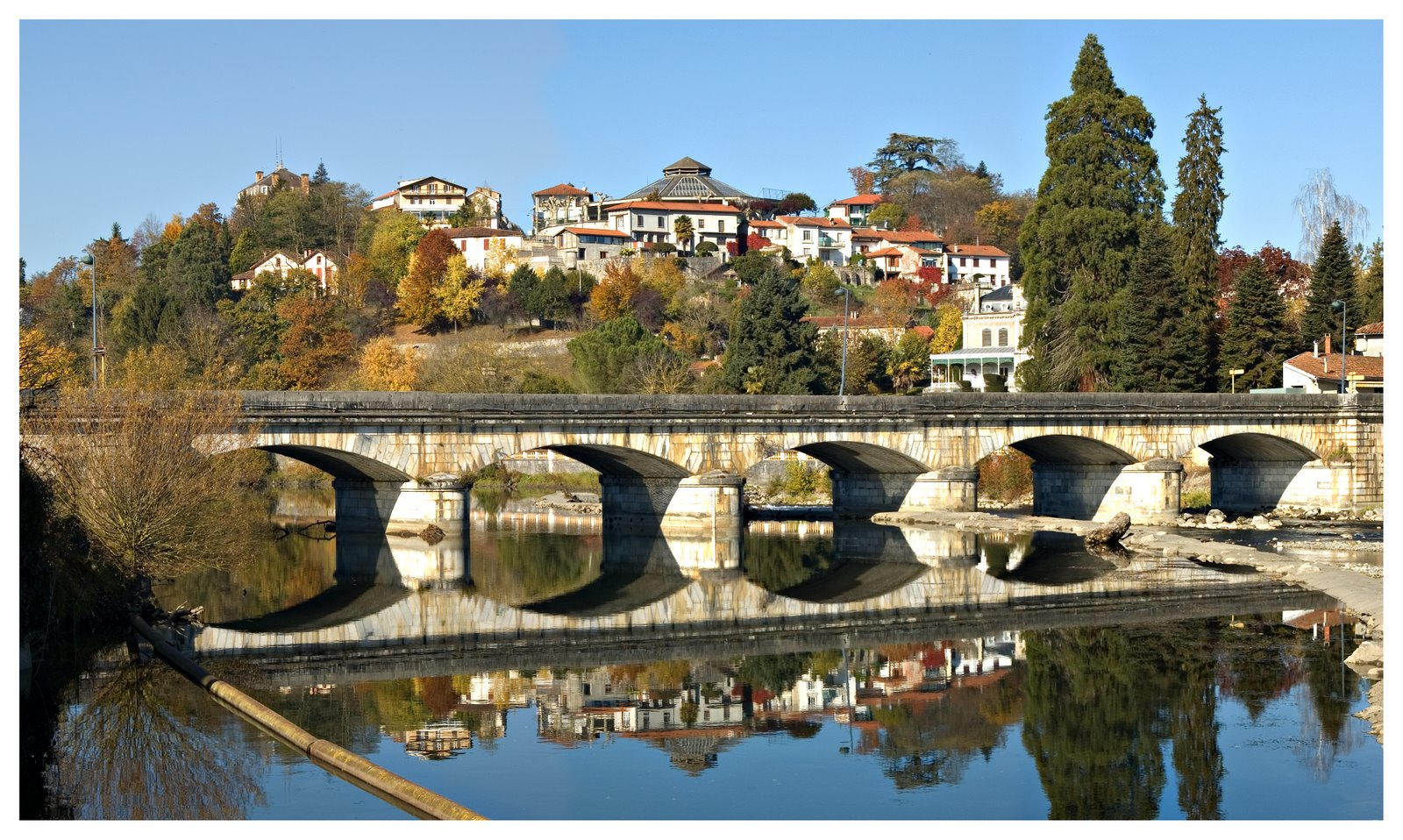
- The Pont de Gourdan

- Coat of arms
- Location of Gourdan-Polignan
- Location within France Location within Occitanie
- Coordinates: 43°04′18″N 0°34′28″E
- Country: France
- Region: Occitania
- Department: Haute-Garonne
- Arrondissement: Saint-Gaudens
- Canton: Bagnères-de-Luchon

Government
  - Mayor (2020–2026): Patrick Saulneron
- Area^{1}: 5.26 km^{2} (2.03 sq mi)
- Elevation: 434 m (1,424 ft)
- Highest elevation: 635 m (2,083 ft)
- Lowest elevation: 411 m (1,348 ft)
- Population (2023): 1,177
  - Density: 224/km^{2} (580/sq mi)
- Time zone: UTC+01:00 (CET)
  - Summer (DST): UTC+02:00 (CEST)
- INSEE/Postal code: 31224 /31210
- ^{1} French Land Register data, which excludes lakes, ponds, glaciers > 1 km^{2} (0.386 sq mi or 247 acres) and river estuaries.

Gourdan-Polignan (French pronunciation: [guʁdɑ̃ pɔliɲɑ̃]; Occitan: Gordan e Polinhan) is a commune in the Haute-Garonne department in southwestern France. Montréjeau-Gourdan-Polignan station has rail connections to Toulouse, Pau, Bayonne and Tarbes.

== Population ==
Historical population
Year	Pop.	±% p.a.
1968	1,664	—
1975	1,656	−0.07%
1982	1,394	−2.43%
1990	1,221	−1.64%
1999	1,194	−0.25%
2007	1,348	+1.53%
2012	1,329	−0.28%
2017	1,203	−1.97%
2023	1,177	−0.36%
Source: INSEE

== See also ==
- Communes of the Haute-Garonne department
