= Les Pujols =

Commune in Occitanie, France

- Commune
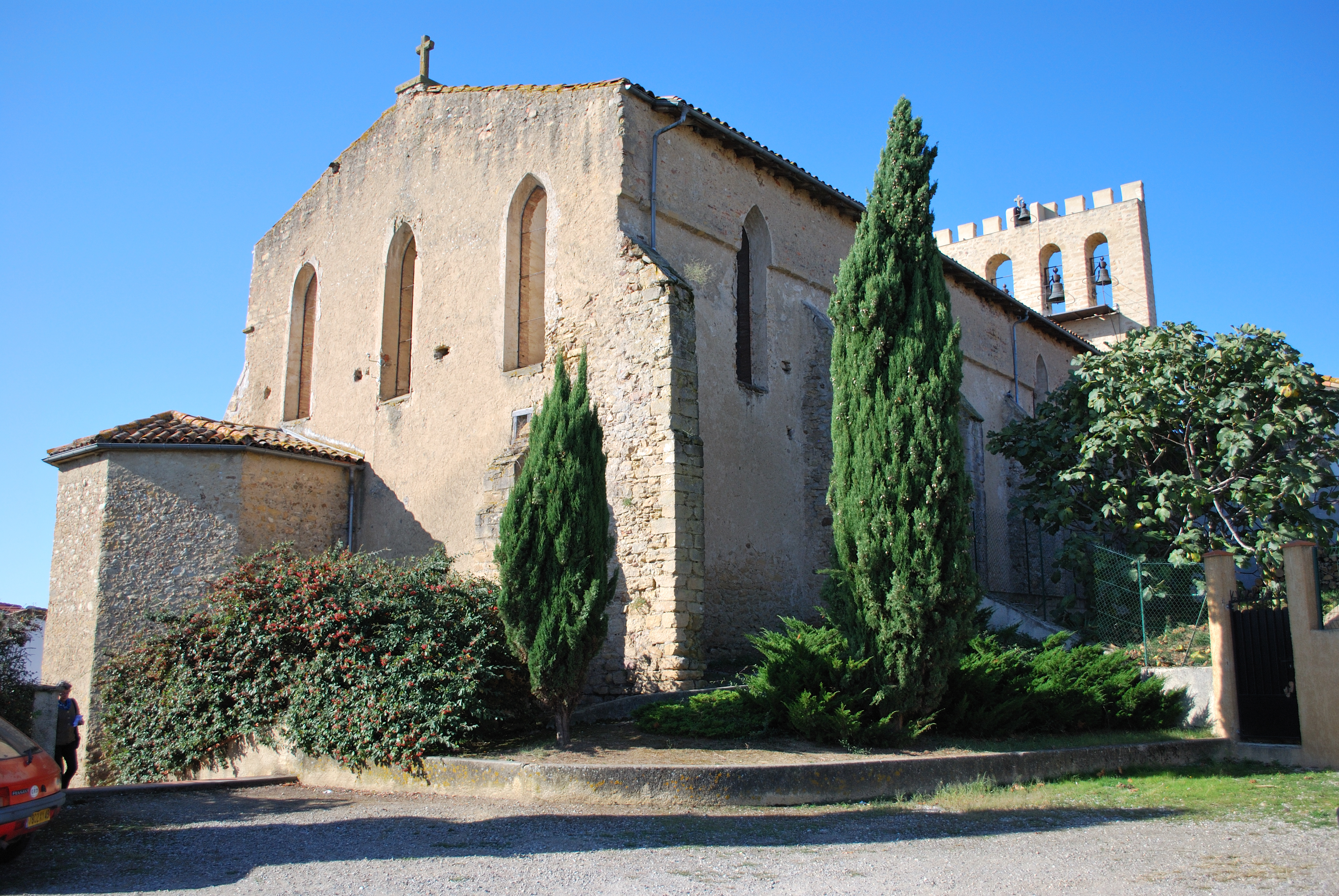
- The church in Les Pujols

- Coat of arms
- Location of Les Pujols
- Location within France Location within Occitanie
- Coordinates: 43°05′21″N 1°43′10″E
- Country: France
- Region: Occitania
- Department: Ariège
- Arrondissement: Pamiers
- Canton: Pamiers-2

Government
  - Mayor (2020–2026): Jérôme Blasquez
- Area^{1}: 13.18 km^{2} (5.09 sq mi)
- Elevation: 335 m (1,099 ft)
- Highest elevation: 384 m (1,260 ft)
- Lowest elevation: 255 m (837 ft)
- Population (2023): 873
  - Density: 66.2/km^{2} (172/sq mi)
- Time zone: UTC+01:00 (CET)
  - Summer (DST): UTC+02:00 (CEST)
- INSEE/Postal code: 09238 /09100
- ^{1} French Land Register data, which excludes lakes, ponds, glaciers > 1 km^{2} (0.386 sq mi or 247 acres) and river estuaries.

Les Pujols (French pronunciation: [le pyʒɔl]; Occitan: Les Pujòls) is a commune in the Ariège department in southwestern France.

== Population ==
The Inhabitants are known as Pujolais in French.

Historical population
Year	Pop.	±% p.a.
1968	387	—
1975	375	−0.45%
1982	417	+1.53%
1990	470	+1.51%
1999	521	+1.15%
2007	651	+2.82%
2012	740	+2.60%
2017	805	+1.70%
2023	873	+1.36%
Source: INSEE

== See also ==
- Communes of the Ariège department
