= Le Vernet, Ariège =

Commune in Occitanie, France

Le Vernet
- Commune
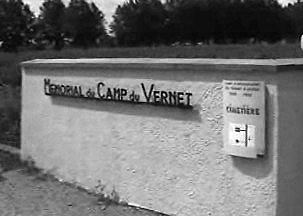
- Memorial for the Le Vernet Internment Camp
- Location of Le Vernet
- Location within France Location within Occitanie
- Coordinates: 43°11′10″N 1°36′11″E
- Country: France
- Region: Occitania
- Department: Ariège
- Arrondissement: Pamiers
- Canton: Portes d'Ariège

Government
  - Mayor (2023–2026): Denis Lafon
- Area^{1}: 5.59 km^{2} (2.16 sq mi)
- Elevation: 261 m (856 ft)
- Highest elevation: 376 m (1,234 ft)
- Lowest elevation: 235 m (771 ft)
- Population (2023): 682
  - Density: 122/km^{2} (316/sq mi)
- Time zone: UTC+01:00 (CET)
  - Summer (DST): UTC+02:00 (CEST)
- INSEE/Postal code: 09331 /09700
- ^{1} French Land Register data, which excludes lakes, ponds, glaciers > 1 km^{2} (0.386 sq mi or 247 acres) and river estuaries.

Le Vernet (French pronunciation: [lə vɛʁnɛ]; Languedocien: Lo Vernet) is a commune in the Ariège department in southwestern France.

== Population ==
Inhabitants of Le Vernet are called Vernétois in French.

Historical population
Year	Pop.	±% p.a.
1968	382	—
1975	417	+1.26%
1982	464	+1.54%
1990	508	+1.14%
1999	536	+0.60%
2007	631	+2.06%
2012	653	+0.69%
2017	708	+1.63%
2023	682	−0.62%
Source: INSEE

== History ==
It was the site of Camp Vernet, a concentration camp built in 1918. During World War II it was used by the Vichy authorities to intern "undesirable aliens", primarily European refugees, including Jews, and as a transit camp for detained Jews who were to be deported to Nazi labor and extermination camps.

== Transport ==
Le Vernet-d'Ariège station has rail connections to Toulouse, Foix and Latour-de-Carol.

== See also ==
- Camp Vernet
- Communes of the Ariège department
