= Luchon station =

Railway station in France

Luchon
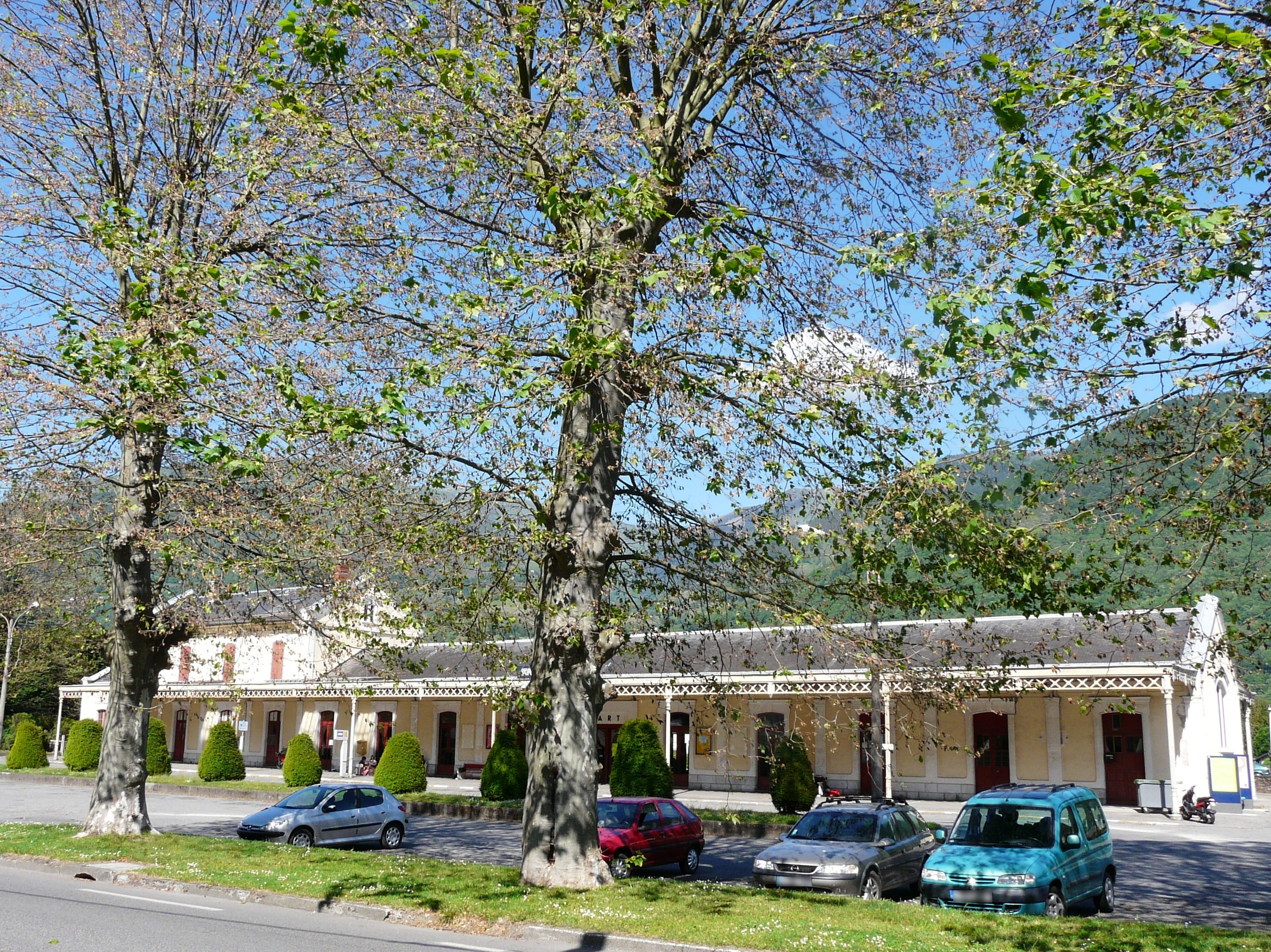
- The passenger building and the entrance to the station

General information
- Location: Avenue de Toulouse, 31110, Bagnères-de-Luchon; France
- Coordinates: 42.7972°N 0.5964°E
- Elevation: 620 m (2,030 ft)
- Owner: RFF / SNCF
- Operator: SNCF: TER – Occitanie
- Line: Montréjeau–Luchon
- Platforms: 2
- Tracks: 2 (+ service lines)

Other information
- Station code: 87611236

History
- Opened: 17 June 1873

Services
Preceding station	TER Occitanie	Following station
Marignac–Saint-Béat towards Montréjeau–Gourdan-Polignan	14	Terminus
Location

The gare de Luchon is a railway station in Bagnères-de-Luchon, Occitanie, France. The station is the southern terminus of the Montréjeau–Luchon railway line.

Due to the poor state of the Montréjeau–Luchon railway, operation of the line was suspended starting 18 November 2014, by SNCF and RFF only TER coaches offered the Montréjeau–Luchon trip.

After restoration of the Montréjeau–Luchon railway, passenger services were restarted on 22 June 2025 with 6 daily return trips.

== Train services ==
The following services call at Luchon:

- 6 return local services (TER Occitanie) Montréjeau–Luchon
- 1 return local service (TER Occitanie) Toulouse–Luchon
