= Le Carlaret =

Commune in Occitanie, France

- Commune
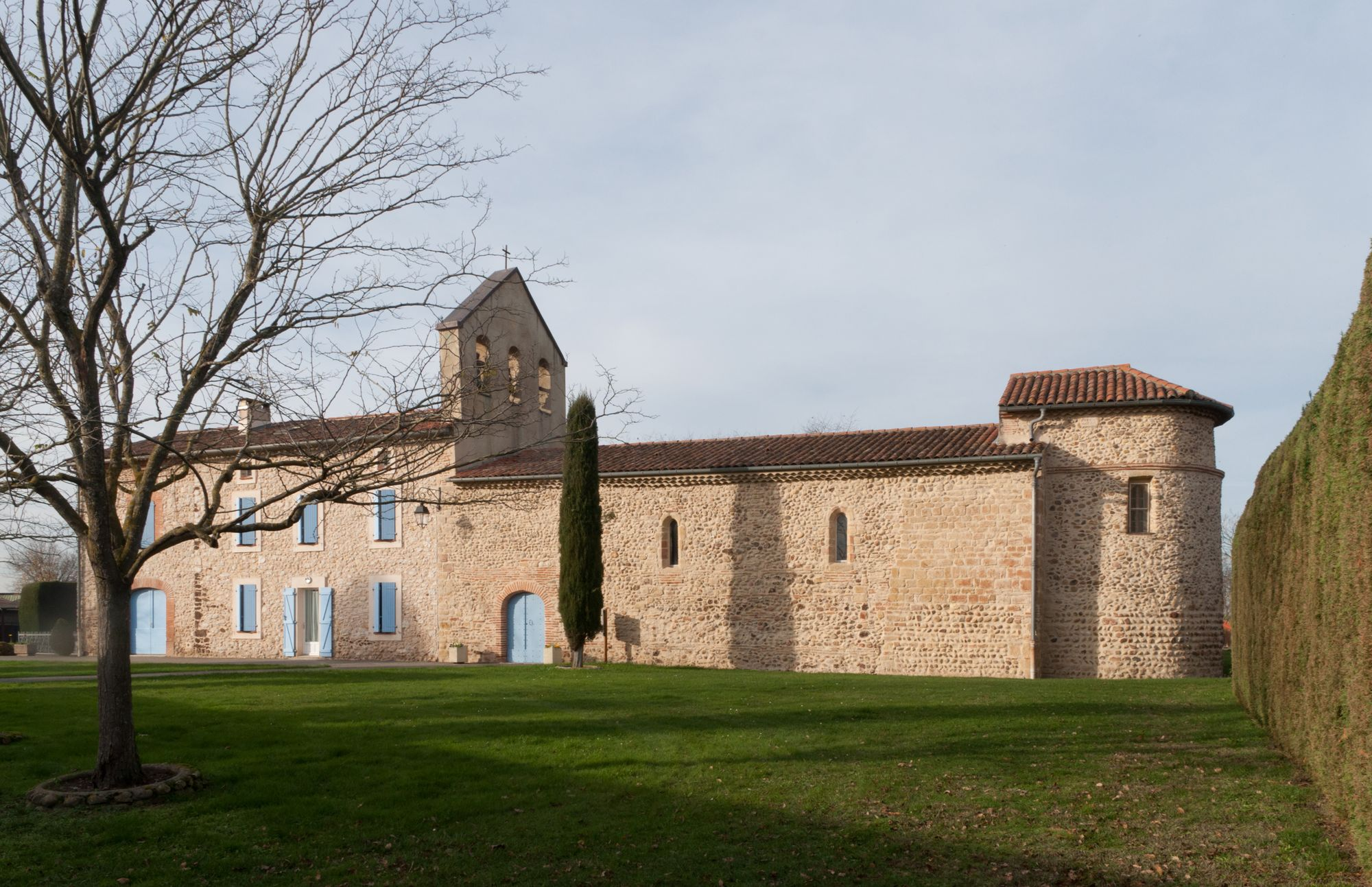
- The church in Le Carlaret
- Location of Le Carlaret
- Location within France Location within Occitanie
- Coordinates: 43°08′30″N 1°41′46″E
- Country: France
- Region: Occitania
- Department: Ariège
- Arrondissement: Pamiers
- Canton: Pamiers-2

Government
  - Mayor (2020–2026): Jean-Marc Soula
- Area^{1}: 9.39 km^{2} (3.63 sq mi)
- Elevation: 289 m (948 ft)
- Highest elevation: 327 m (1,073 ft)
- Lowest elevation: 250 m (820 ft)
- Population (2023): 295
  - Density: 31.4/km^{2} (81.4/sq mi)
- Time zone: UTC+01:00 (CET)
  - Summer (DST): UTC+02:00 (CEST)
- INSEE/Postal code: 09081 /09100
- ^{1} French Land Register data, which excludes lakes, ponds, glaciers > 1 km^{2} (0.386 sq mi or 247 acres) and river estuaries.

Le Carlaret (French pronunciation: [lə kaʁlaʁɛ]) is a commune in the Ariège department in southwestern France.

== Population ==
Its inhabitants are called Carlaretois in French.

Historical population
Year	Pop.	±% p.a.
1968	135	—
1975	154	+1.90%
1982	149	−0.47%
1990	142	−0.60%
1999	141	−0.08%
2007	201	+4.53%
2012	257	+5.04%
2017	277	+1.51%
2023	295	+1.05%
Source: INSEE

== See also ==
- Communes of the Ariège department
