= Pamiers =

Subprefecture and commune in Occitanie, France

- Subprefecture and commune
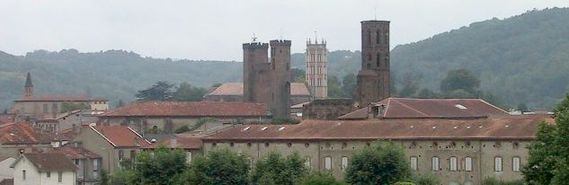
- A general view of Pamiers

- Coat of arms
- Location of Pamiers
- Location within France Location within Occitanie
- Coordinates: 43°07′03″N 1°36′42″E
- Country: France
- Region: Occitania
- Department: Ariège
- Arrondissement: Pamiers
- Canton: 2 Cantons (Pamiers-1 and 2)
- Intercommunality: Portes d'Ariège Pyrénées

Government
  - Mayor (2026–32): Jean-Philippe Sannac (DVC)
- Area^{1}: 45.85 km^{2} (17.70 sq mi)
- Elevation: 298 m (978 ft)
- Highest elevation: 473 m (1,552 ft)
- Lowest elevation: 256 m (840 ft)
- Population (2023): 16,473
  - Density: 359.3/km^{2} (930.5/sq mi)
- Time zone: UTC+01:00 (CET)
  - Summer (DST): UTC+02:00 (CEST)
- INSEE/Postal code: 09225 /09100
- ^{1} French Land Register data, which excludes lakes, ponds, glaciers > 1 km^{2} (0.386 sq mi or 247 acres) and river estuaries.

Pamiers (French pronunciation: [pamje]; Occitan: Pàmias Occitan pronunciation: [ˈpamjɔs]) is a commune and largest city in the Ariège department in the Occitanie region in southwestern France. It is a sub-prefecture of the department. It is the most populous commune in the Ariège department, although it is not the capital which is the smaller town of Foix. The seat of the Bishop of Pamiers is at the Pamiers Cathedral. The current mayor of the town is Jean-Philippe Sannac.

== Geography ==
Pamiers is located on the river Ariège.

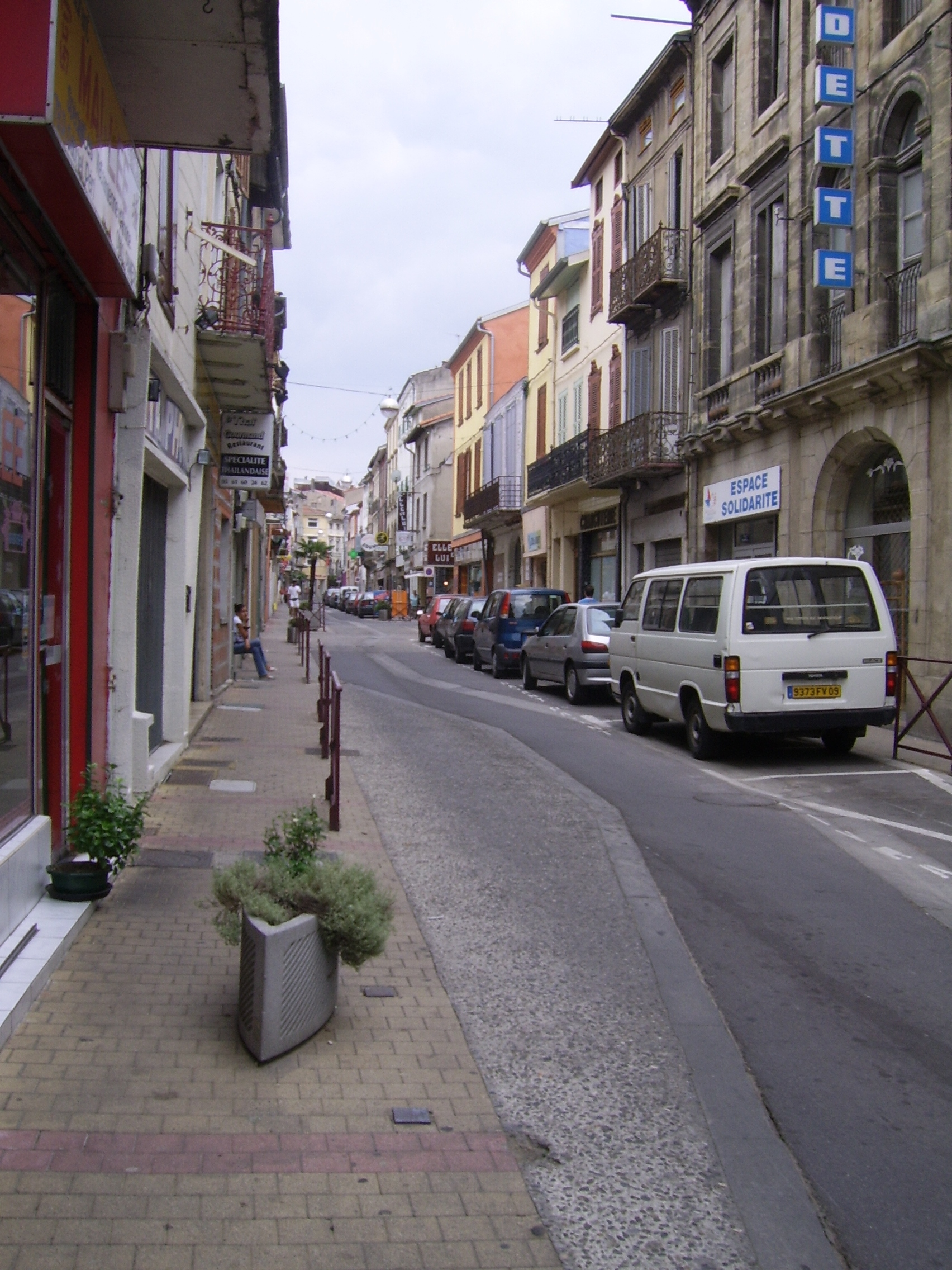
Street in the town centre

The town of Pamiers is famous for its three bell towers and for being the birthplace of Gabriel Fauré, one of the greatest French musicians and composers of the late 19th and early 20th century. It also boasts awards for Ville fleurie, the equivalent of "town in bloom". Local facilities include good restaurants, bars, supermarkets, large public indoor and outdoor swimming pools (one of which is 50m). Pamiers lies in an ancient alluvial plain of the Ariège in the area called La Basse Ariège, noted for its rich fertile soil ideal for agriculture. Pamiers has 16,473 inhabitants, the Appaméens, and is the economic capital of the Ariège, being the most important town in the department.

The main square of Pamiers, Place de la République, is paved in red marble. Every week, three large open-air farmers' markets are held, plus a flea market every Sunday morning. Nearby are the old Tour des Cordeliers and the large Church of Notre-Dame-du-Camp.

== History ==
The town itself dates back to the 5th century. The origin of its name is subject to debate. A certain school of linguists tends to believe that it was derived from the fact that, when Pamiers was founded, its new inhabitants were given land parcels measured in pams', from empan (from the Latin "pannus" meaning "piece of cloth"). Originally it was called Ville de Pams. Another explanation is one involving Roger II de Foix, who had gone to a crusade in the region of Apamea in Syria and who, upon his return to France, gave his castle and domain the name of one of his battles: Castrum Appamiae, name later on given to the town. The fact that Pamiers' inhabitants are called Appaméens would seem to favour this hypothesis. In the 18th century a plural stance on the word was introduced making the name "Apamias" derived from ecclesiastical language and also similar to the Occitan language. The Occitan name "Pamias" can be seen on the town sign, alongside the French name Pamiers, as one enters the town via the old route from Toulouse, RN20.

== Personalities ==
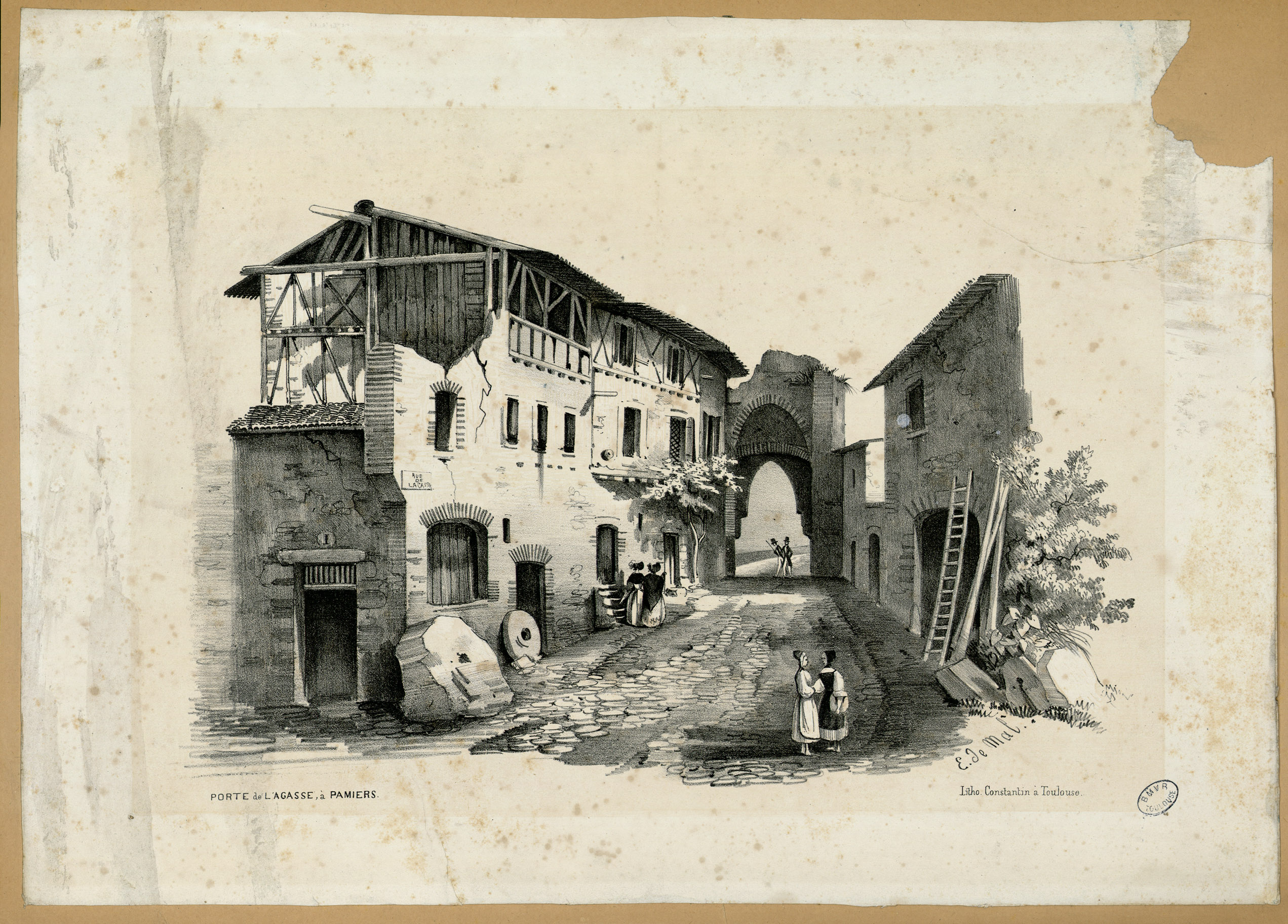
Porte de l'Agasse in Pamiers, by Eugène de Malbos near 1840.

Pamiers was the birthplace or hometown of:

- Marc-Guillaume Alexis Vadier (1736-1828), politician at the time of the French Revolution
- Claire Lacombe (1765-1826) actress and militant during the French Revolution
- Caroline Montigny-Rémaury (1843–1913), pianist
- Gabriel Fauré (1845-1924), composer
- Théophile Delcassé (1852-1923), statesman
- Pope Benedict XII, (c. 1280-1342), bishop of Pamiers in the 1320s
- Swanne Gauthier, basketball player
- Yoann Huget, rugby player

== Transportation ==
Pamiers station has rail connections to Toulouse, Foix and Latour-de-Carol.

== Population ==
Historical population

Year	Pop.	±% p.a.
1793	4,954	—
1800	6,174	+3.20%
1806	5,646	−1.48%
1821	5,919	+0.32%
1831	6,048	+0.22%
1836	6,905	+2.69%
1841	6,480	−1.26%
1846	7,667	+3.42%
1851	7,770	+0.27%
1856	7,631	−0.36%
1861	7,910	+0.72%
1866	7,877	−0.08%
1872	8,690	+1.65%
1876	8,967	+0.79%
1881	11,726	+5.51%
1886	11,944	+0.37%
1891	11,143	−1.38%
1896	10,657	−0.89%
1901	10,886	+0.43%

Year	Pop.	±% p.a.
1906	10,449	−0.82%
1911	10,017	−0.84%
1921	12,012	+1.83%
1926	12,131	+0.20%
1931	13,164	+1.65%
1936	14,035	+1.29%
1946	12,026	−1.53%
1954	12,822	+0.80%
1962	13,297	+0.46%
1968	14,564	+1.53%
1975	14,325	−0.24%
1982	13,345	−1.01%
1990	12,965	−0.36%
1999	13,417	+0.38%
2007	15,574	+1.88%
2012	15,483	−0.12%
2017	15,675	+0.25%
2023	16,473	+0.83%

Source: EHESS and INSEE (1968-2023)

== Climate ==
Climate data for Pamiers (Montaut), elevation 295 m (968 ft), (2002–2020 normals, extremes 2002–present)
Month	Jan	Feb	Mar	Apr	May	Jun	Jul	Aug	Sep	Oct	Nov	Dec	Year
Record high °C (°F)	20.8 (69.4)	24.1 (75.4)	24.3 (75.7)	28.6 (83.5)	31.4 (88.5)	38.6 (101.5)	38.9 (102.0)	41.1 (106.0)	33.7 (92.7)	31.2 (88.2)	25.1 (77.2)	20.1 (68.2)	41.1 (106.0)
Mean daily maximum °C (°F)	9.2 (48.6)	10.3 (50.5)	13.9 (57.0)	17.2 (63.0)	20.2 (68.4)	25.0 (77.0)	27.4 (81.3)	27.5 (81.5)	24.3 (75.7)	19.5 (67.1)	13.5 (56.3)	10.3 (50.5)	18.2 (64.8)
Daily mean °C (°F)	5.9 (42.6)	6.4 (43.5)	9.5 (49.1)	12.5 (54.5)	15.5 (59.9)	19.8 (67.6)	21.9 (71.4)	21.9 (71.4)	18.9 (66.0)	15.0 (59.0)	9.8 (49.6)	6.8 (44.2)	13.7 (56.7)
Mean daily minimum °C (°F)	2.6 (36.7)	2.5 (36.5)	5.0 (41.0)	7.8 (46.0)	10.7 (51.3)	14.5 (58.1)	16.4 (61.5)	16.2 (61.2)	13.5 (56.3)	10.5 (50.9)	6.2 (43.2)	3.3 (37.9)	9.1 (48.4)
Record low °C (°F)	−7.4 (18.7)	−11.7 (10.9)	−8.7 (16.3)	−1.4 (29.5)	0.4 (32.7)	5.9 (42.6)	9.7 (49.5)	7.6 (45.7)	4.7 (40.5)	−1.4 (29.5)	−5.2 (22.6)	−8.1 (17.4)	−11.7 (10.9)
Average precipitation mm (inches)	67.8 (2.67)	45.2 (1.78)	55.9 (2.20)	68.4 (2.69)	78.8 (3.10)	54.4 (2.14)	46.0 (1.81)	43.1 (1.70)	42.3 (1.67)	55.6 (2.19)	63.4 (2.50)	56.2 (2.21)	677.1 (26.66)
Average precipitation days (≥ 1.0 mm)	10.5	8.3	9.7	9.3	9.9	7.9	6.3	6.1	6.3	7.2	9.8	9.2	100.5
Mean monthly sunshine hours	100.1	128.8	170.3	195.4	210.2	237.7	259.5	241.7	212.0	170.7	118.7	113.2	2,158.2
Source: Meteociel

== See also ==
- 1st Parachute Chasseur Regiment, a regiment based in the commune
- Communes of the Ariège department
- County of Foix
- List of medieval bridges in France
