= Saint-Amadou =

Commune in Occitanie, France

- Commune
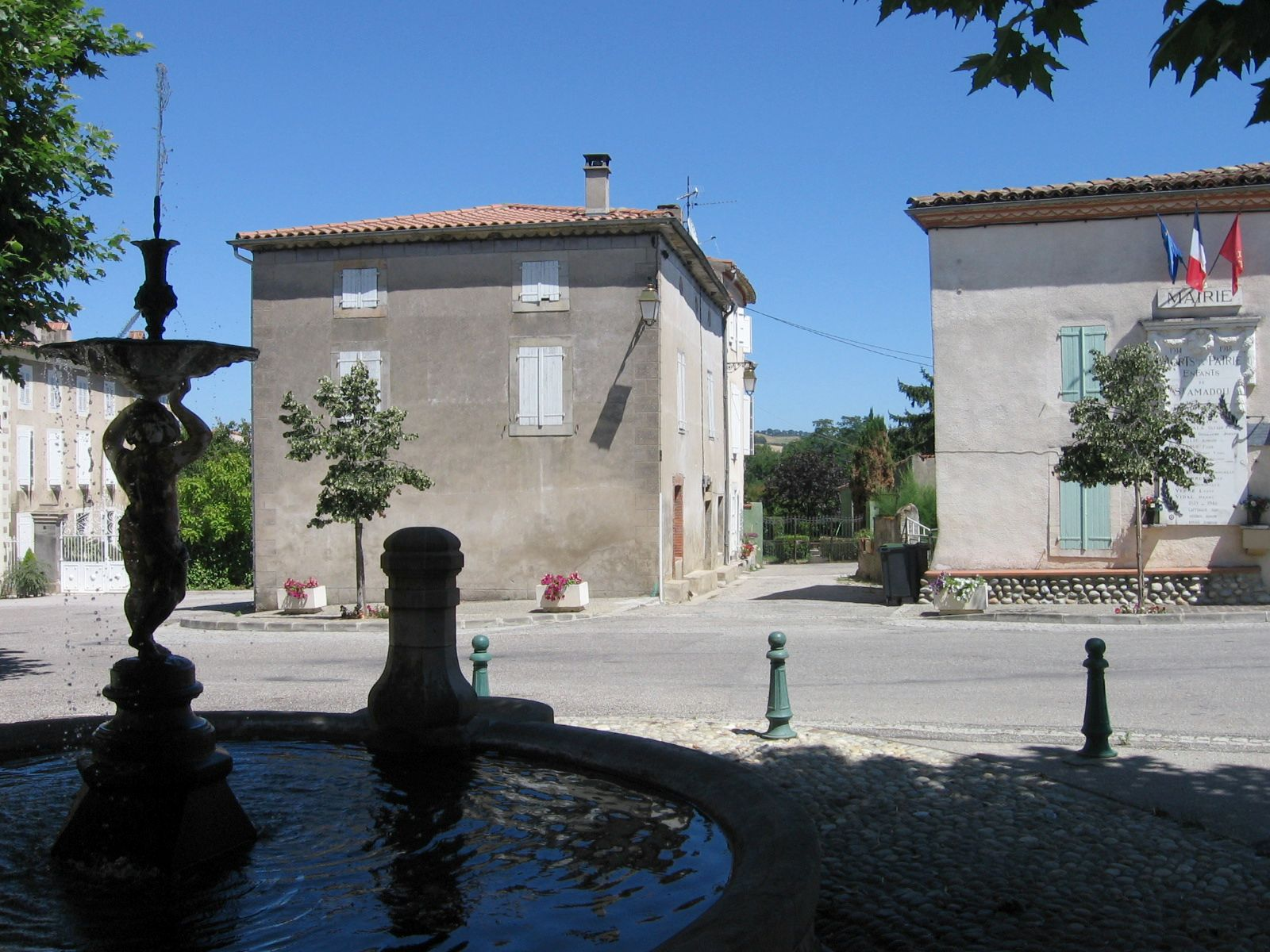
- The centre of Saint-Amadou

- Coat of arms
- Location of Saint-Amadou
- Location within France Location within Occitanie
- Coordinates: 43°06′44″N 1°43′28″E
- Country: France
- Region: Occitania
- Department: Ariège
- Arrondissement: Pamiers
- Canton: Pamiers-2

Government
  - Mayor (2020–2026): Serge Villeroux
- Area^{1}: 4.64 km^{2} (1.79 sq mi)
- Elevation: 283 m (928 ft)
- Highest elevation: 334 m (1,096 ft)
- Lowest elevation: 253 m (830 ft)
- Population (2023): 283
  - Density: 61.0/km^{2} (158/sq mi)
- Time zone: UTC+01:00 (CET)
  - Summer (DST): UTC+02:00 (CEST)
- INSEE/Postal code: 09254 /09100
- ^{1} French Land Register data, which excludes lakes, ponds, glaciers > 1 km^{2} (0.386 sq mi or 247 acres) and river estuaries.

Saint-Amadou (French pronunciation: [sɛ̃.t‿amadu]; Occitan: Sant Amador) is a commune in the Ariège department in southwestern France.

== Population ==
Inhabitants are called Saint-Amadouens in French.

Historical population
Year	Pop.	±% p.a.
1968	215	—
1975	166	−3.63%
1982	156	−0.88%
1990	189	+2.43%
1999	215	+1.44%
2007	229	+0.79%
2012	254	+2.09%
2017	241	−1.05%
2023	283	+2.71%
Source: INSEE

== See also ==
- Communes of the Ariège department
