= Antras, Ariège =

Commune in Occitanie, France

Antras
- Commune
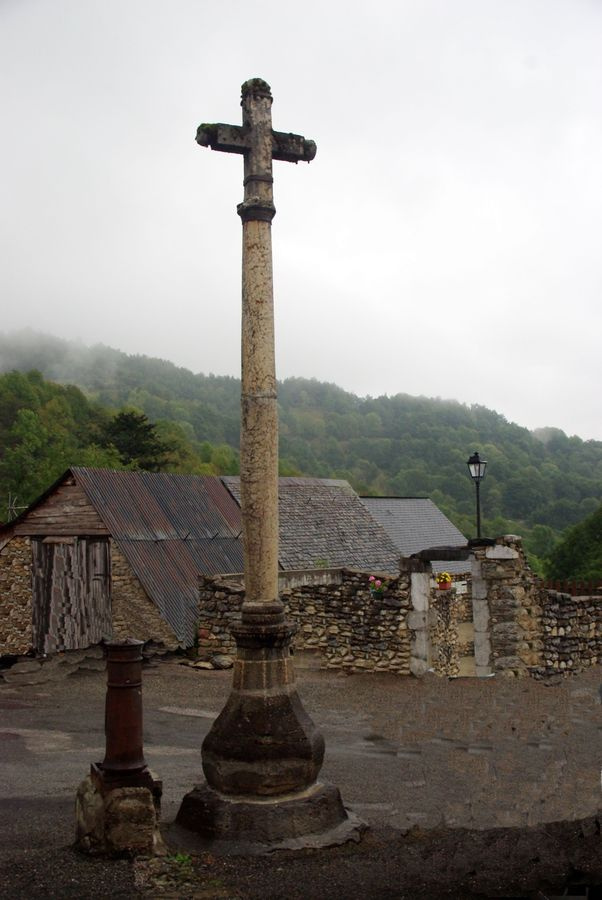
- The Marble Cross in the village square
- Location of Antras
- Location within France Location within Occitanie
- Coordinates: 42°52′57″N 0°56′38″E
- Country: France
- Region: Occitania
- Department: Ariège
- Arrondissement: Saint-Girons
- Canton: Couserans Ouest
- Intercommunality: Couserans-Pyrénées

Government
  - Mayor (2020–2026): Marc Woiry
- Area^{1}: 20.02 km^{2} (7.73 sq mi)
- Elevation: 900 m (3,000 ft)
- Highest elevation: 2,268 m (7,441 ft)
- Lowest elevation: 777 m (2,549 ft)
- Population (2023): 74
  - Density: 3.7/km^{2} (9.6/sq mi)
- Time zone: UTC+01:00 (CET)
  - Summer (DST): UTC+02:00 (CEST)
- INSEE/Postal code: 09011 /09800
- ^{1} French Land Register data, which excludes lakes, ponds, glaciers > 1 km^{2} (0.386 sq mi or 247 acres) and river estuaries.

Antras (Antràs in Occitan) is a commune in the Ariège department in the Occitanie region of southwestern France.

== Geography ==
Antras is located some 25 km south-east of Saint-Gaudens, 20 km north-east of Bagneres-de-Luchon, and only 1 km from the Spanish border. It was part of the former province of Couserans in the Biros Valley. No district roads or highways pass through the commune and the only access to the village is by a mountain road (the Route d'Antras) from the D4 road at Sentein. There are few roads in the commune with some mountain tracks and unformed roads. The commune is mountainous and heavily forested.

The Ruisseau d'Antras flows from the commune down to Sentein where it joins the Lez which continues to Saint-Girons where it joins the Salat river.

== Administration ==
List of Successive Mayors of Antras

From	To	Name
2001	2008	Aimé Cep
2008	2026	Marc Woiry

== Population ==
The inhabitants of the commune are known as Antrasois or Antrasoises in French.

Historical population
Year	Pop.	±% p.a.
1968	59	—
1975	45	−3.80%
1982	48	+0.93%
1990	60	+2.83%
1999	58	−0.38%
2007	73	+2.92%
2012	58	−4.50%
2017	65	+2.31%
2023	74	+2.18%
Source: INSEE

== Sites and Monuments ==
- A Marble Cross (1785) is registered as an historical monument.
- A Romanesque Parish Church. The church contains several items that are registered as historical objects:
  - 6 Candlesticks (18th century)
  - An Altar, Retable, Tabernacle, Altar dais, a Painting, and 2 Statues (18th century)
  - A Sculpture: Chrisme (12th century)
  - A Chalice with Paten (19th century)
  - An Ampulla of Saint Chrême (19th century)
  - A Statue: Virgin and child (18th century)

== See also ==
- Communes of the Ariège department
