= Aucazein =

Commune in Occitanie, France

- Commune
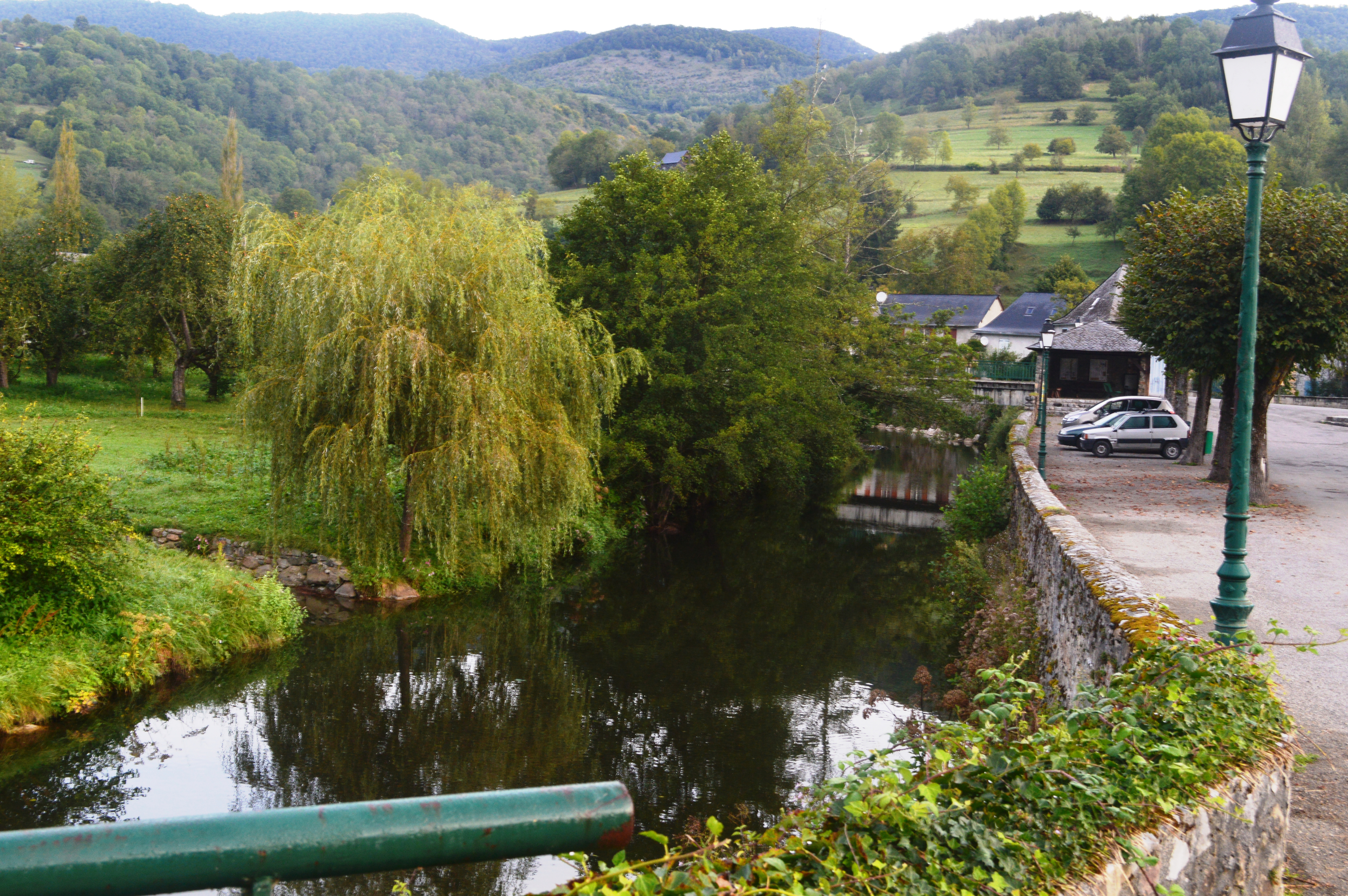
- The Bouigane River at Aucazein
- Location of Aucazein
- Location within France Location within Occitanie
- Coordinates: 42°56′12″N 0°58′32″E
- Country: France
- Region: Occitania
- Department: Ariège
- Arrondissement: Saint-Girons
- Canton: Couserans Ouest
- Intercommunality: CC Couserans - Pyrénées

Government
  - Mayor (2020–2026): Marcel Agert
- Area^{1}: 6.02 km^{2} (2.32 sq mi)
- Elevation: 550 m (1,800 ft)
- Highest elevation: 1,682 m (5,518 ft)
- Lowest elevation: 531 m (1,742 ft)
- Population (2023): 65
  - Density: 11/km^{2} (28/sq mi)
- Time zone: UTC+01:00 (CET)
  - Summer (DST): UTC+02:00 (CEST)
- INSEE/Postal code: 09025 /09800
- ^{1} French Land Register data, which excludes lakes, ponds, glaciers > 1 km^{2} (0.386 sq mi or 247 acres) and river estuaries.

Aucazein (French pronunciation: [okazɛ̃]; Occitan: Aucasenh) is a commune in the Ariège department in the Occitanie region of south-western France.

== Geography ==
Aucazein is located in the Ariège Natural Regional Park some 40 km south-east of Saint-Gaudens in a direct line and 20 km west by south-west of Saint-Girons at an altitude of 570 metres. Access to the commune is by road D 618 from Orgibet in the west which passes through the north of the commune and the village and continues east to Argein. Most of the land area of the commune is rugged and forested however the valley where the village is located has some farmland.

The Bouigane river flows east along the valley and through the village on its way to join the Lez at Audressein. The Ruisseau de Cassech forms the western border of the commune as it flows north to join the Bouigane. Similarly La Rivière forms the eastern border of the commune and also joins the Bouigane. The Ruisseau de Recoule flows from the north and passes through the commune for a short distance before joining the Bouigane.

== History ==
The commune is located on the Way of St. James which crosses Ariège. The Knights Templar built a Romanesque chapel in the commune.

== Administration ==
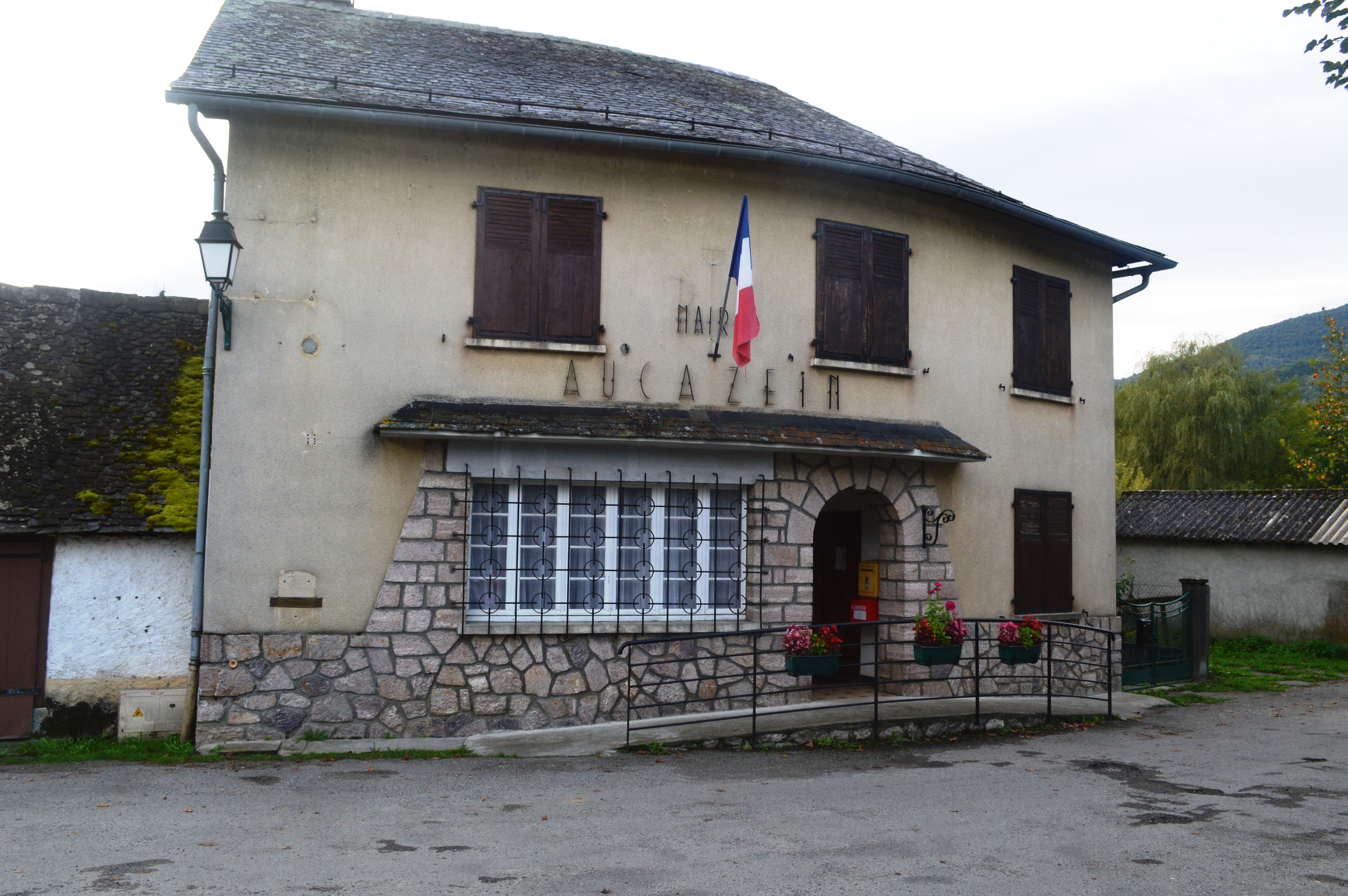
The Town Hall

List of Successive Mayors

| From | To | Name |
|---|---|---|
| 2001 | 2008 | Claude Vignes |
| 2008 | 2014 | Claude Dupuy |
| 2014 | 2020 | Claude Geslin |
| 2020 | 2026 | Marcel Agert |

== Demography ==
The inhabitants of the commune are known as Aucazénois in French.

Historical population

| Year | Pop. | ±% p.a. |
|---|---|---|
| 1793 | 196 | — |
| 1821 | 318 | +1.74% |
| 1846 | 408 | +1.00% |
| 1872 | 350 | −0.59% |
| 1901 | 228 | −1.47% |
| 1926 | 154 | −1.56% |
| 1946 | 114 | −1.49% |
| 1962 | 84 | −1.89% |
| 1968 | 80 | −0.81% |

| Year | Pop. | ±% p.a. |
|---|---|---|
| 1975 | 65 | −2.92% |
| 1982 | 52 | −3.14% |
| 1990 | 48 | −1.00% |
| 1999 | 57 | +1.93% |
| 2007 | 62 | +1.06% |
| 2012 | 65 | +0.95% |
| 2017 | 59 | −1.92% |
| 2023 | 65 | +1.63% |

Source: EHESS and INSEE

== Sites and monuments ==
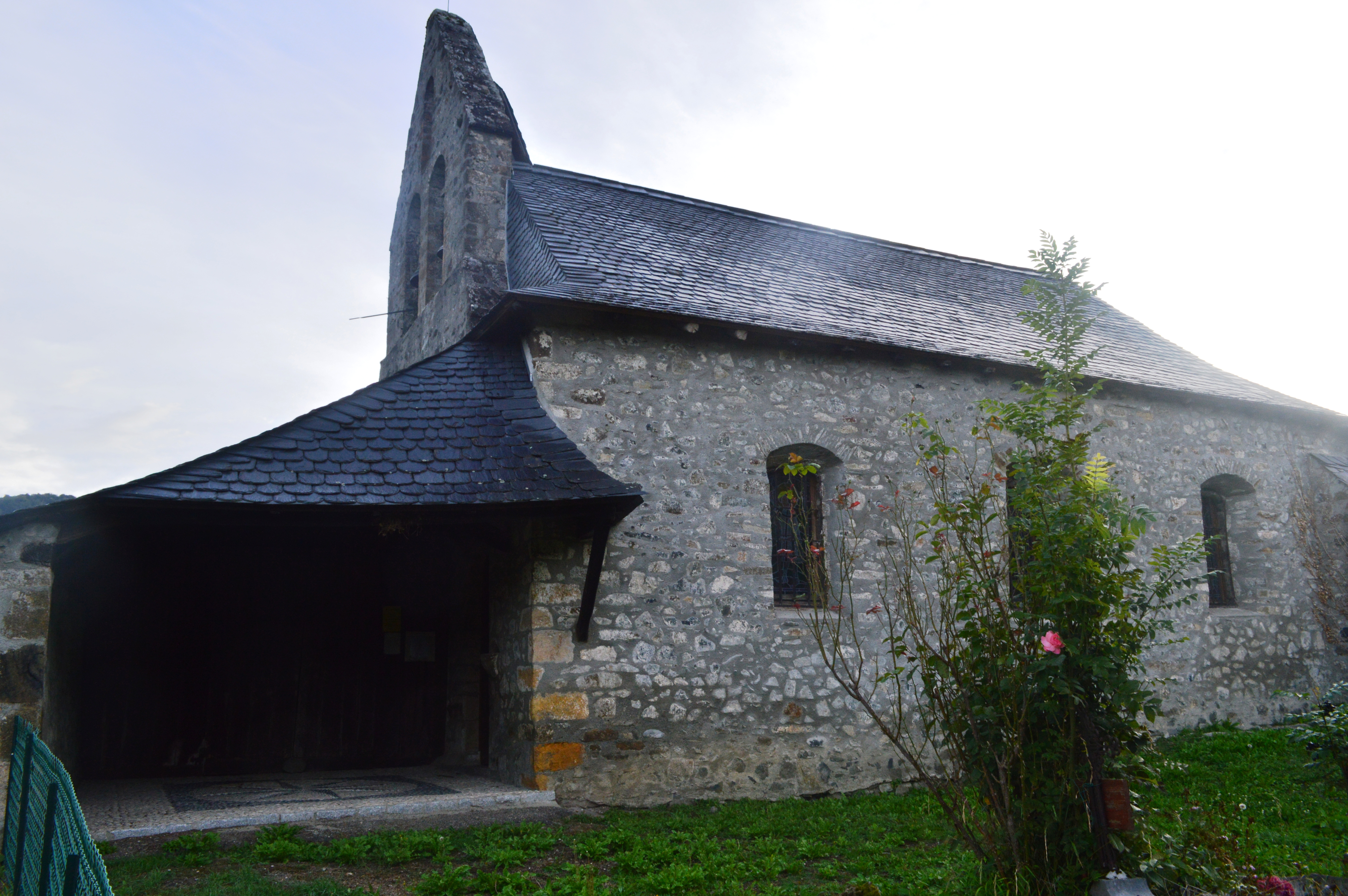
The Church of Saint Aubin

The commune has one site that is registered as a historical monument:

- An Ornamental Garden

The commune has some other sites of interest:

- The Remains of a feudal Chateau (private property)
- 2 Mills
- An Oratory
- The Church of Saint-Aubin
- A Metal Bridge built in 1905 over the Bouigane

== See also ==
- Communes of the Ariège department
