= Arrout =

Commune in Occitanie, France

- Commune
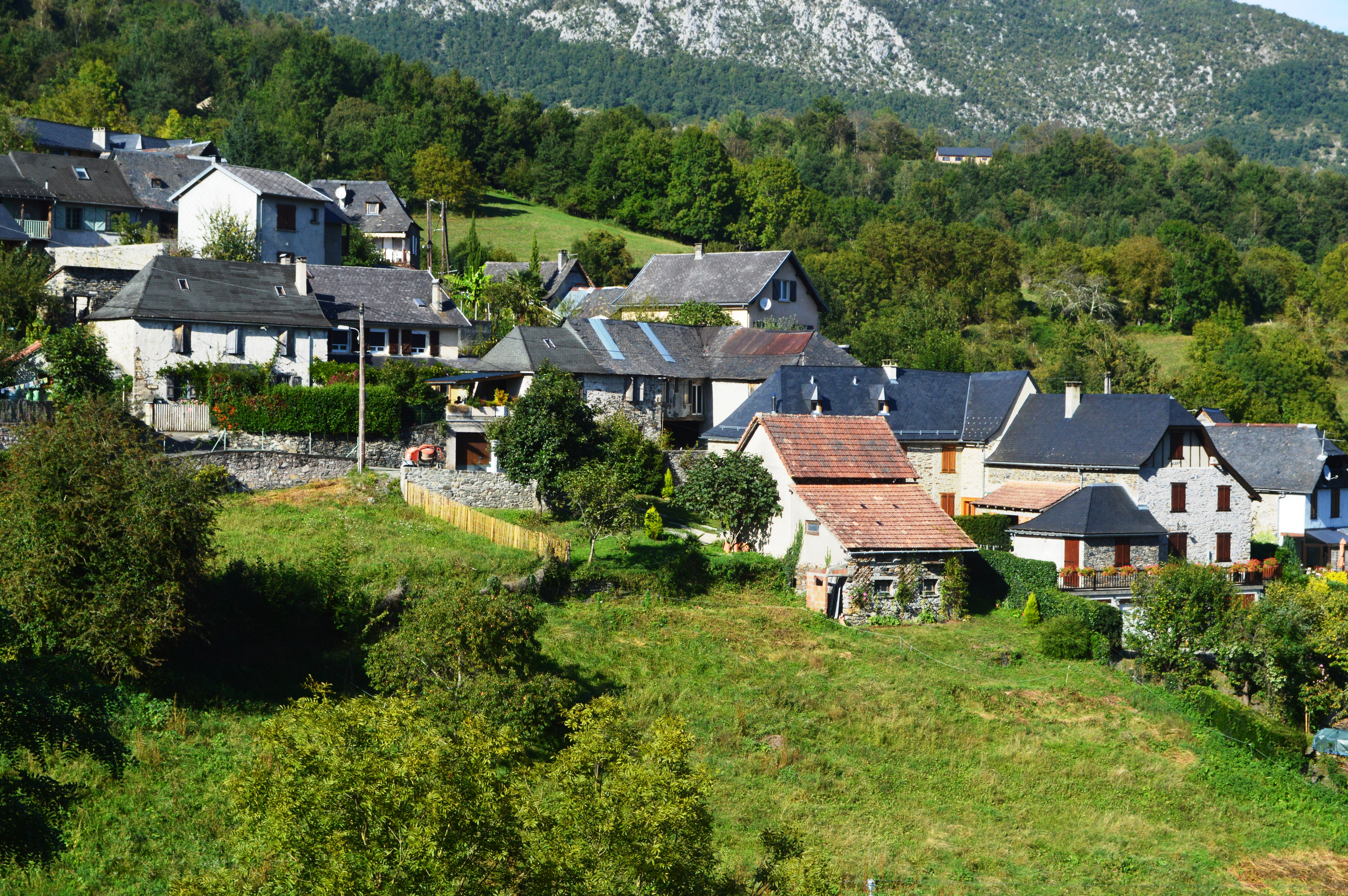
- A general view of Arrout

- Coat of arms
- Location of Arrout
- Location within France Location within Occitanie
- Coordinates: 42°56′44″N 1°01′43″E
- Country: France
- Region: Occitania
- Department: Ariège
- Arrondissement: Saint-Girons
- Canton: Couserans Ouest
- Intercommunality: CC Couserans - Pyrénées

Government
  - Mayor (2020–2026): Patrice Savarino
- Area^{1}: 3.02 km^{2} (1.17 sq mi)
- Elevation: 600 m (2,000 ft)
- Highest elevation: 959 m (3,146 ft)
- Lowest elevation: 480 m (1,570 ft)
- Population (2023): 92
  - Density: 30/km^{2} (79/sq mi)
- Time zone: UTC+01:00 (CET)
  - Summer (DST): UTC+02:00 (CEST)
- INSEE/Postal code: 09018 /09800
- ^{1} French Land Register data, which excludes lakes, ponds, glaciers > 1 km^{2} (0.386 sq mi or 247 acres) and river estuaries.

Arrout (French pronunciation: [aʁu]; Occitan: Arrot) is a commune in the Ariège department in the Occitanie region of south-western France.

== Geography ==
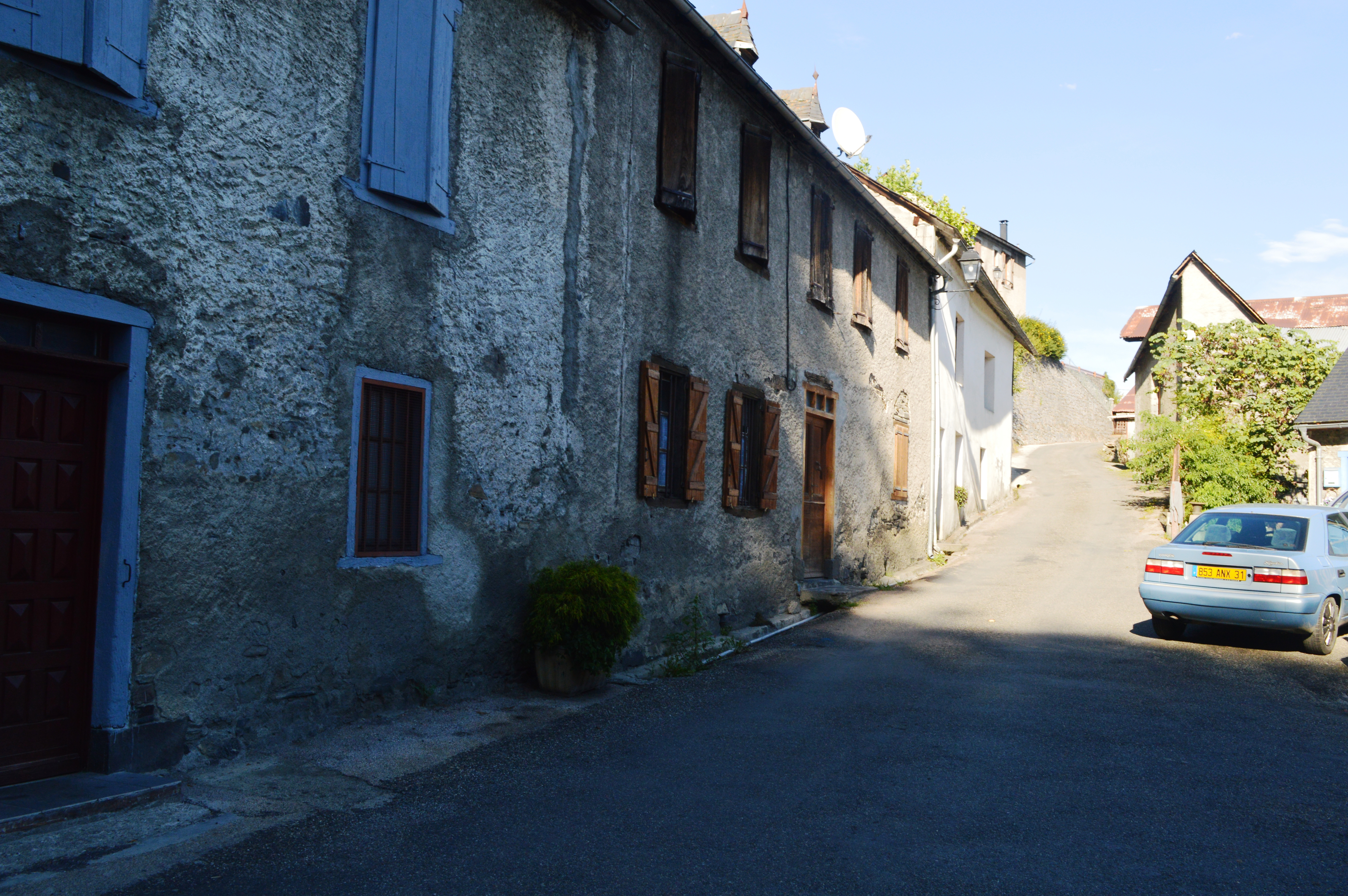
A Street in Arrout

Arrout is a commune in the Pyrenees mountains in the former province of Couserans some 12 km south-west of Saint-Girons and 3 km north of Castillon-en-Couserans. Access to the commune is by a country road from the end of the D404, which comes from Cescau in the south-east, to the village or by the Chemin d'Arrout from Audressein in the south. There is also a country road from Alas in the north-east. The commune is rugged and heavily forested throughout.

The Lez River forms the southeastern border of the commune as it flows north-east to join the Salat at Saint-Girons. The Cayssau stream rises in the north-west and forms the north-western border before joining the Ruisseau de Lachein. The Ruisseau de Lasquert rises in the centre of the commune and flows north-east to join the Ruisseau de Lachein which flows south-west to join the Lez.

=== Heraldry ===
Arms of Arrout	Blazon: Quarterly, 1 and 4 Azure with a roundel of Or; 2 and 3 Argent with an eagle of Sable.

== Administration ==
List of Successive Mayors

From	To	Name
2001	2010	Georges Garié
2010	2020	Christiane Vignau
2020	2026	Patrice Savarino

== Demography ==
The inhabitants of the commune are known as Arrotois or Arrotoises in French.

Historical population

Year	Pop.	±% p.a.
1793	223	—
1821	89	−3.23%
1846	312	+5.15%
1872	262	−0.67%
1901	251	−0.15%
1926	145	−2.17%
1946	103	−1.70%
1962	68	−2.56%
1968	52	−4.37%

Year	Pop.	±% p.a.
1975	44	−2.36%
1982	47	+0.95%
1990	64	+3.93%
1999	60	−0.71%
2007	65	+1.01%
2012	76	+3.18%
2017	85	+2.26%
2023	92	+1.33%

Source: EHESS and INSEE

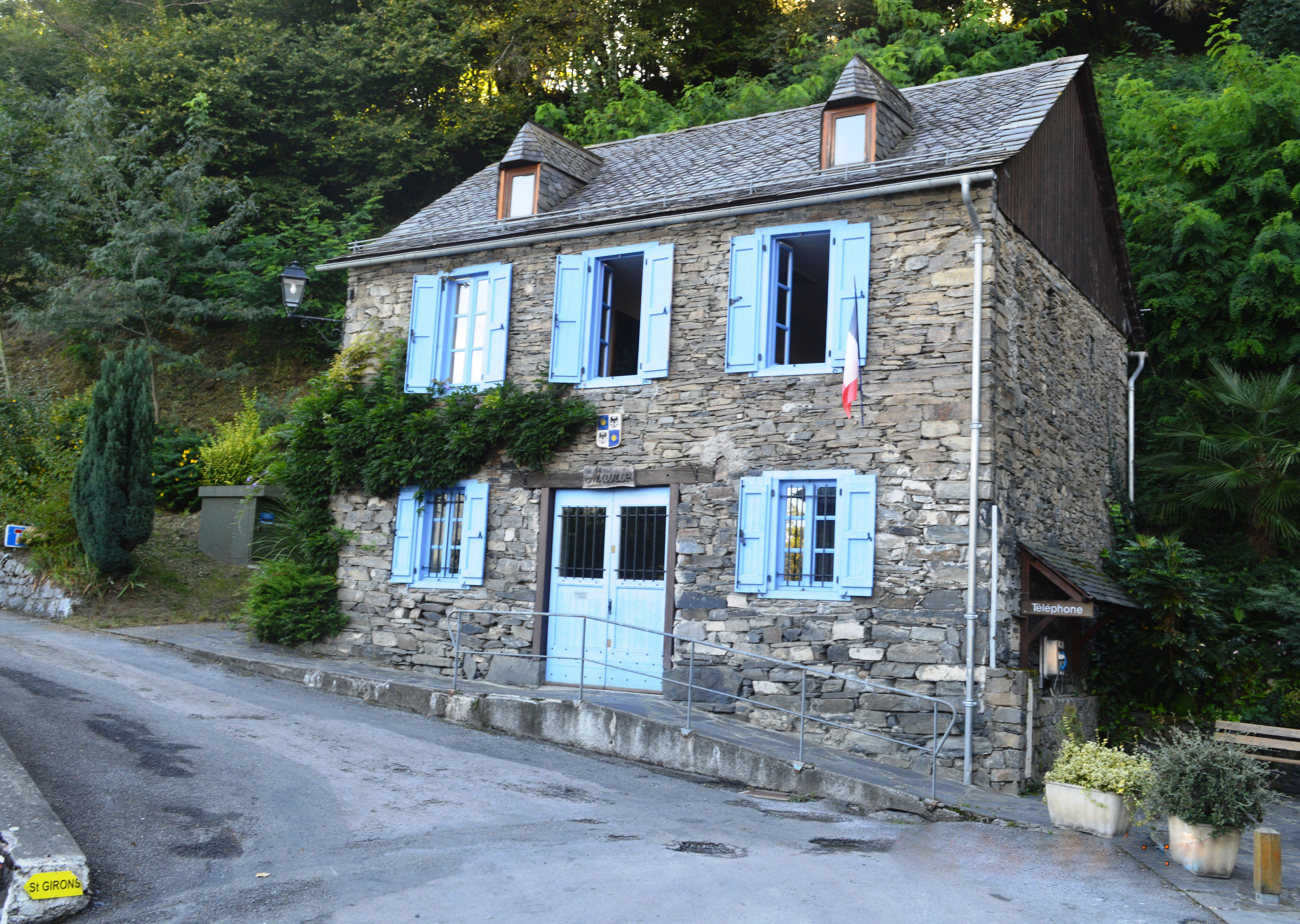
The Town Hall

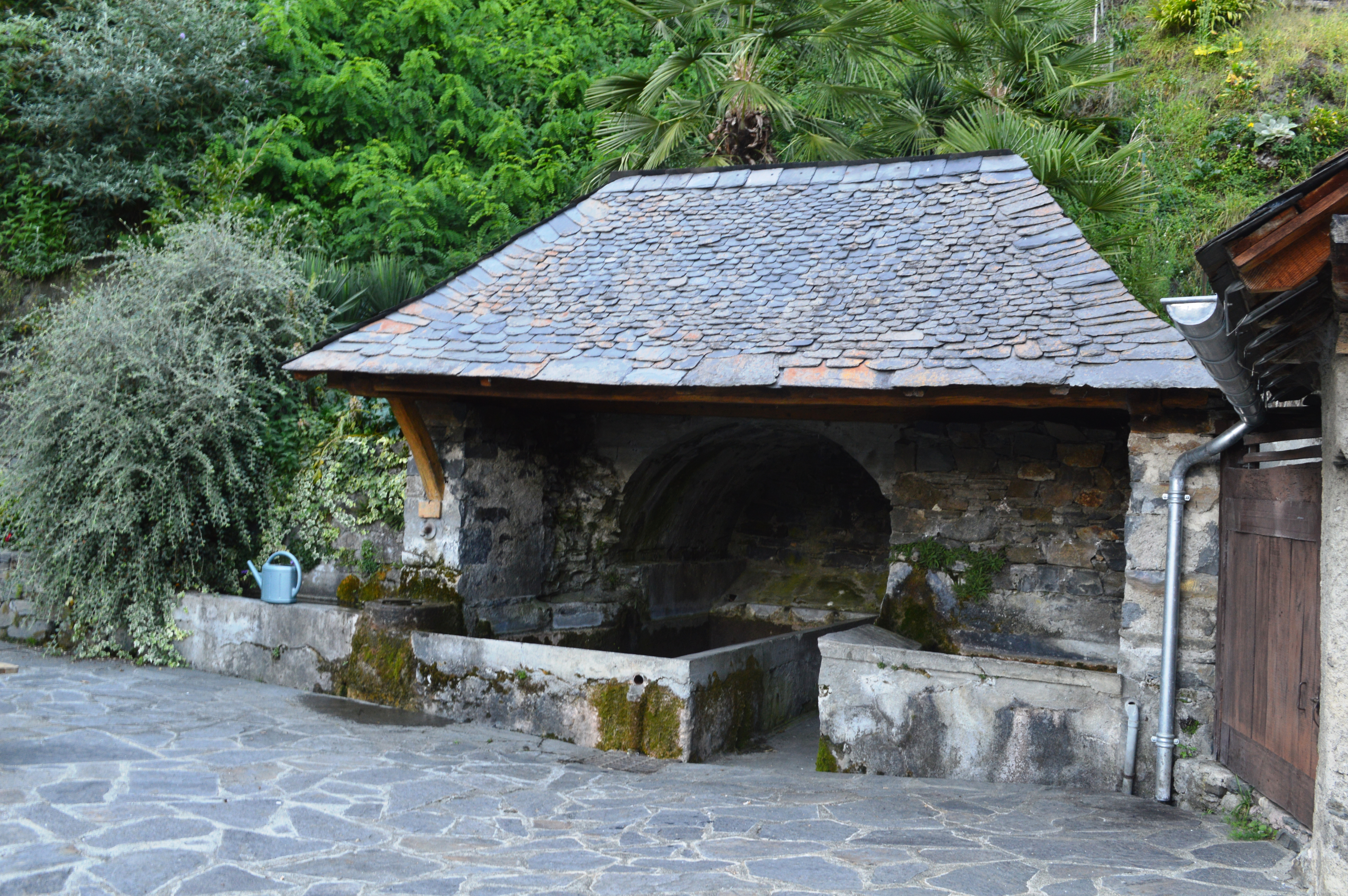
The Lavoir (Public Laundry)

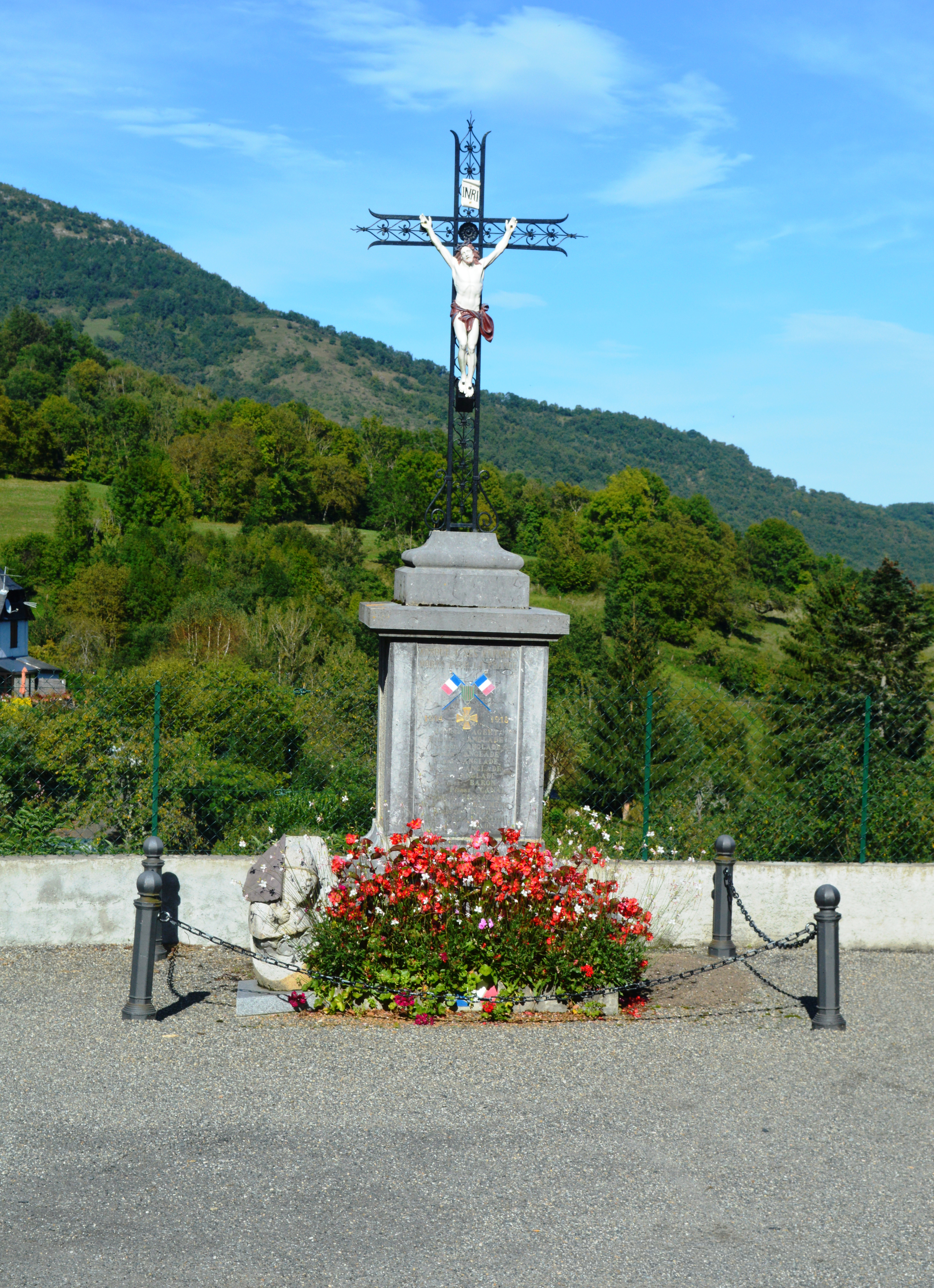
The Arrout War Memorial

== Culture and Heritage ==
Arrout is one of the communes who received the Green Star of Esperanto from Esperanto info, an award given to mayors of communes who take a census of Esperanto speakers.

=== Religious Heritage ===
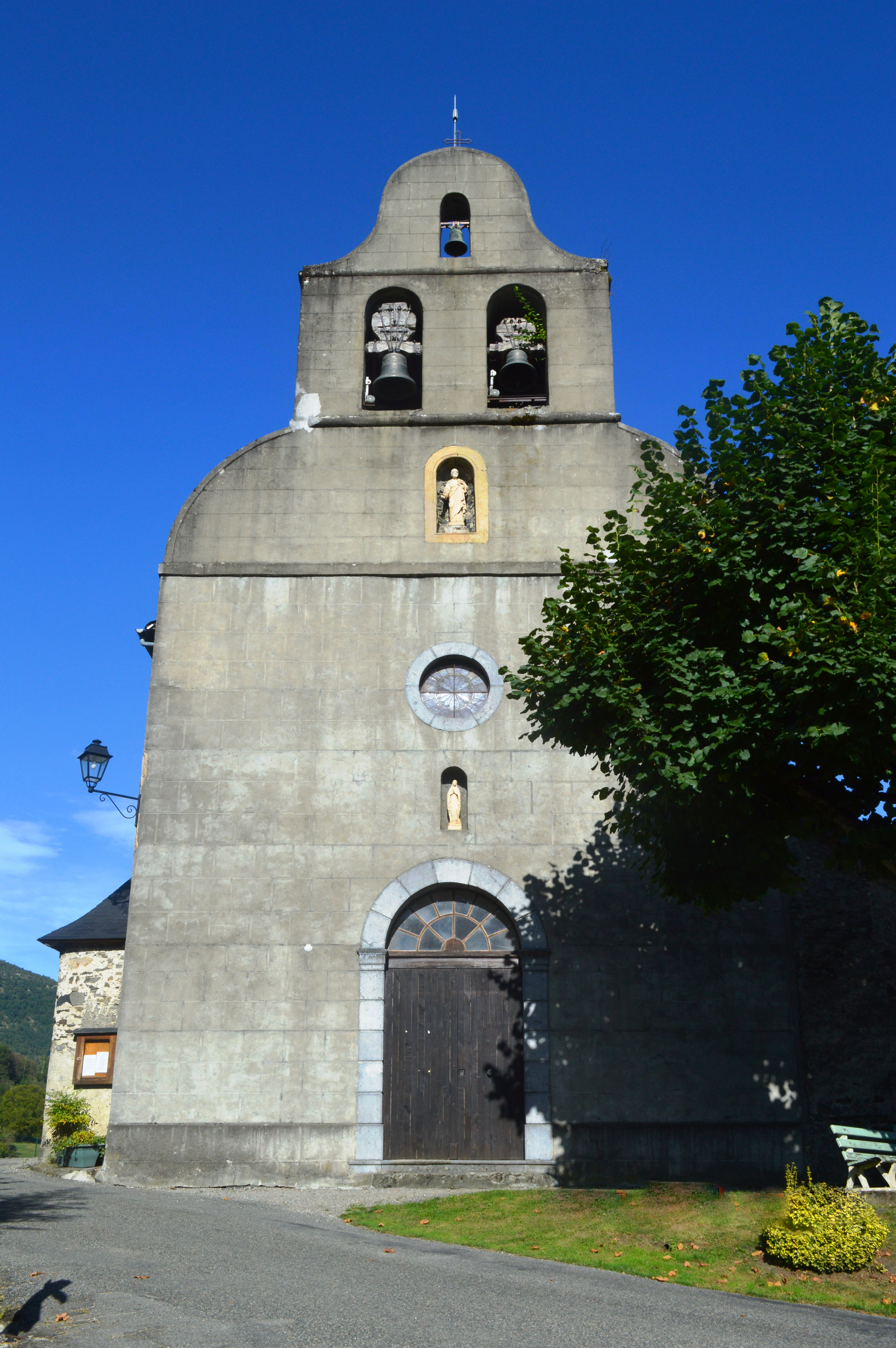
Arrout Church

The Church contains three items that are registered as historical objects:

- A Chalice with Paten (17th century)
- A Ciborium (17th century)
- A Templar door (12th century)

== See also ==
- Communes of the Ariège department
