= Augirein =

Commune in Occitanie, France

- Commune
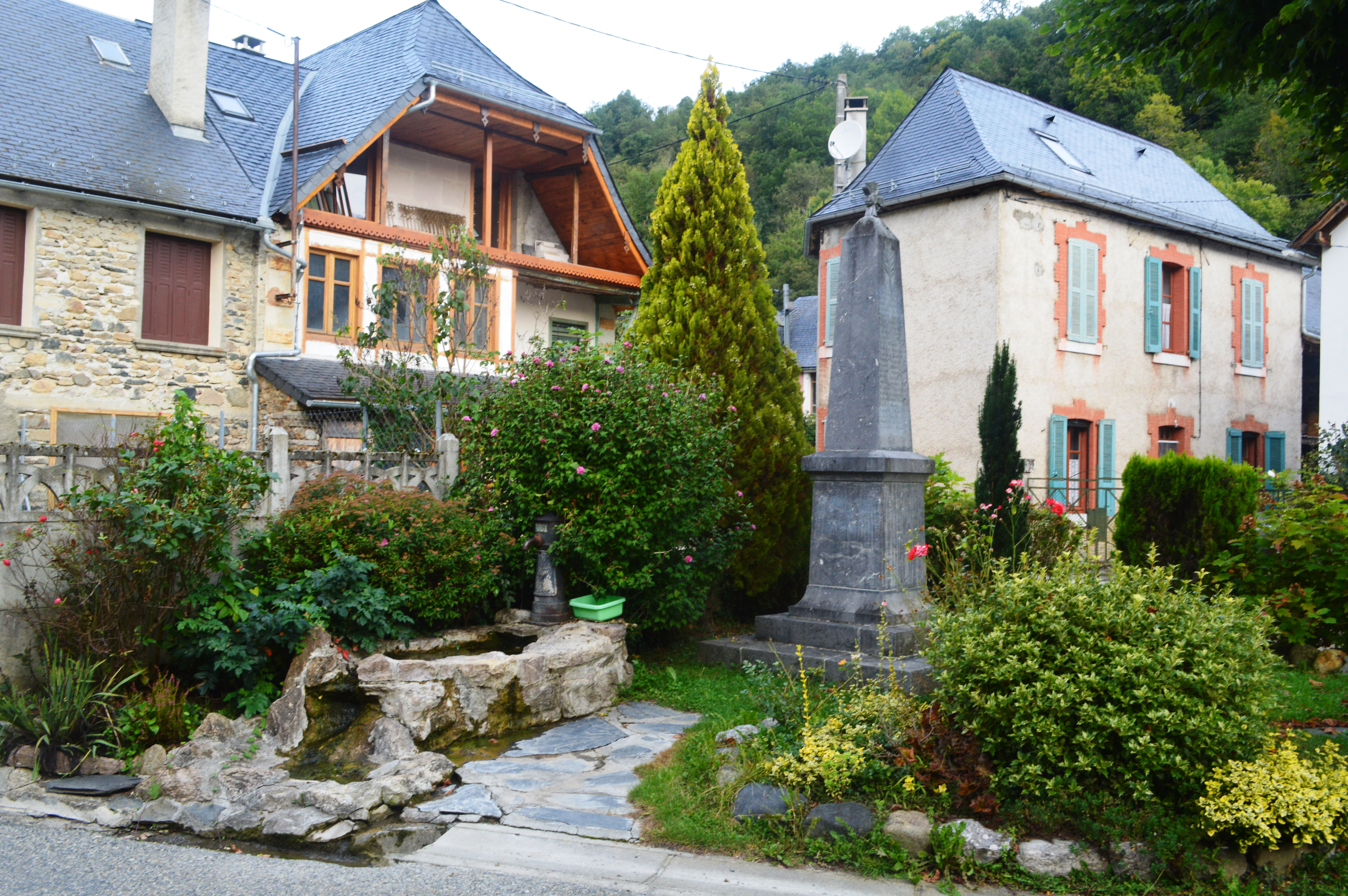
- The main square in Augirein
- Location of Augirein
- Location within France Location within Occitanie
- Coordinates: 42°55′57″N 0°55′03″E
- Country: France
- Region: Occitania
- Department: Ariège
- Arrondissement: Saint-Girons
- Canton: Couserans Ouest
- Intercommunality: CC Couserans - Pyrénées

Government
  - Mayor (2020–2026): Charles Daffis
- Area^{1}: 9.84 km^{2} (3.80 sq mi)
- Elevation: 634 m (2,080 ft)
- Highest elevation: 1,721 m (5,646 ft)
- Lowest elevation: 631 m (2,070 ft)
- Population (2023): 80
  - Density: 8.1/km^{2} (21/sq mi)
- Time zone: UTC+01:00 (CET)
  - Summer (DST): UTC+02:00 (CEST)
- INSEE/Postal code: 09027 /09800
- ^{1} French Land Register data, which excludes lakes, ponds, glaciers > 1 km^{2} (0.386 sq mi or 247 acres) and river estuaries.

Augirein (French pronunciation: [oʒiʁɛ̃]; Occitan: Augirenh) is a commune in the Ariège department in the Occitanie region of south-western France.

== Geography ==
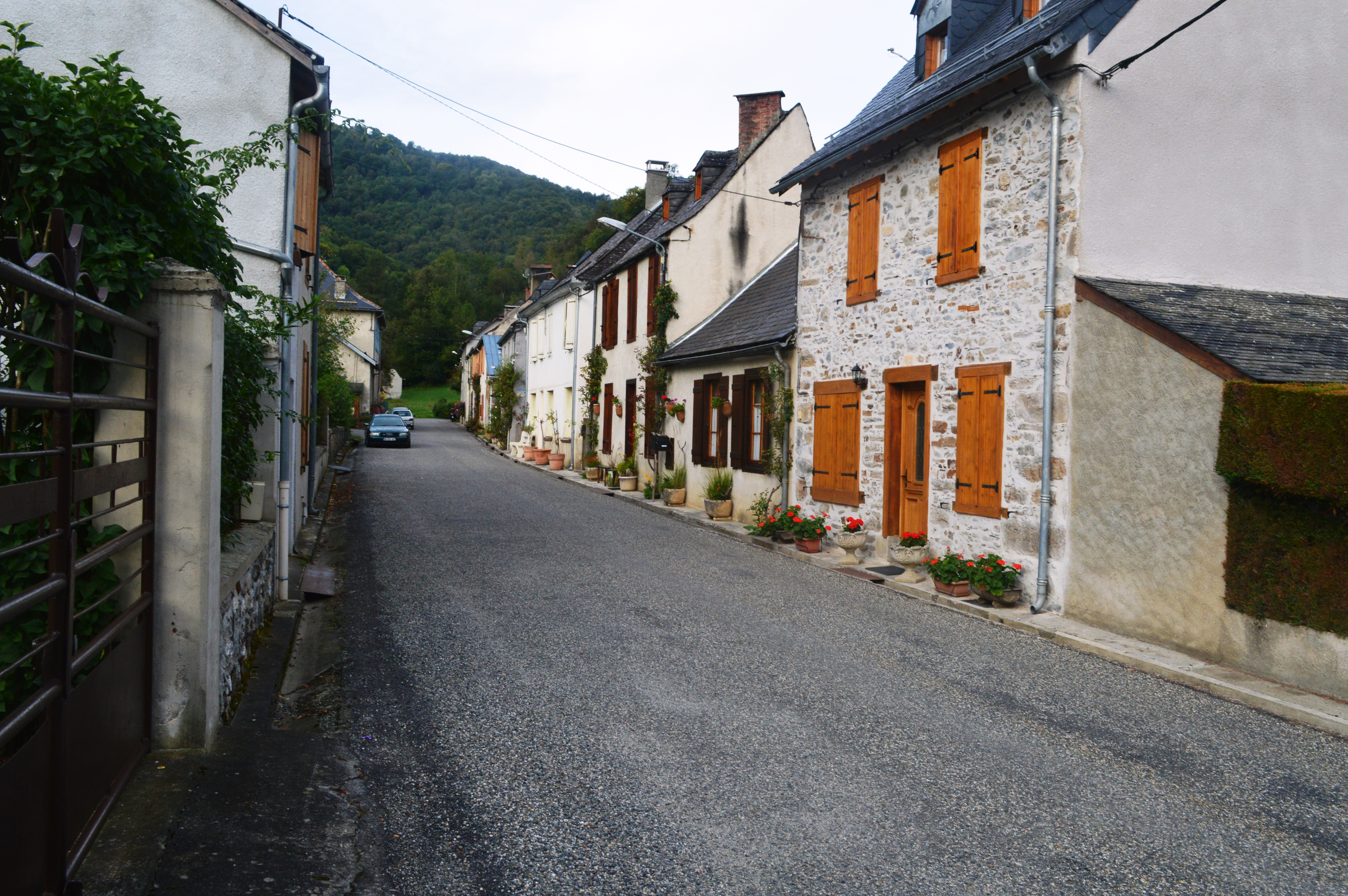
A Street in Augirein

Augirein is located in the former province of Couserans some 30 km south-east of Saint-Gaudens and 25 km west by south-west of Saint-Girons. Access to the commune is by road D618 from Saint-Lary in the west which passes through the north of the commune and the village and continues east to Orgibet. Just east of the village is the hamlet of Terrefete. The commune is almost all rugged and heavily forested except for a small area in the north where the village is.

The Bouigane river flows through the north of the commune from west to east and continues to join the Lez at Audressein. The Ruisseau de Nede rises south of the commune and flows through the centre from south to north to join the Bouigane on the north-eastern border of the commune. Several tributaries rise in the commune and join the Ruisseau de Nede including the Ruisseau de Couledoux and the Ruisseau des Souls.

== Climate ==
On average, Augirein experiences 80.4 days per year with a minimum temperature below 0 °C (32.0 °F), 1.7 days per year with a minimum temperature below −10 °C (14.0 °F), 1.6 days per year with a maximum temperature below 0 °C (32.0 °F), and 20.2 days per year with a maximum temperature above 30 °C (86.0 °F). The record high temperature was 39.5 °C (103.1 °F) on 21 August 2011, while the record low temperature was −17.5 °C (0.5 °F) on 8 February 2012.

Climate data for Augirein (1991–2020 normals, extremes 1990–present)
Month	Jan	Feb	Mar	Apr	May	Jun	Jul	Aug	Sep	Oct	Nov	Dec	Year
Record high °C (°F)	23.5 (74.3)	27.0 (80.6)	28.0 (82.4)	30.5 (86.9)	34.0 (93.2)	37.0 (98.6)	38.5 (101.3)	39.5 (103.1)	35.0 (95.0)	32.0 (89.6)	28.0 (82.4)	24.3 (75.7)	39.5 (103.1)
Mean daily maximum °C (°F)	10.5 (50.9)	11.6 (52.9)	14.9 (58.8)	16.6 (61.9)	20.0 (68.0)	23.3 (73.9)	25.5 (77.9)	26.1 (79.0)	22.9 (73.2)	19.4 (66.9)	13.8 (56.8)	10.6 (51.1)	17.9 (64.3)
Daily mean °C (°F)	4.8 (40.6)	5.4 (41.7)	8.4 (47.1)	10.3 (50.5)	13.8 (56.8)	17.1 (62.8)	19.1 (66.4)	19.3 (66.7)	16.0 (60.8)	12.8 (55.0)	7.9 (46.2)	5.2 (41.4)	11.7 (53.0)
Mean daily minimum °C (°F)	−1.0 (30.2)	−0.7 (30.7)	1.7 (35.1)	4.0 (39.2)	7.6 (45.7)	10.8 (51.4)	12.7 (54.9)	12.5 (54.5)	9.1 (48.4)	6.3 (43.3)	2.0 (35.6)	−0.3 (31.5)	5.4 (41.7)
Record low °C (°F)	−14.0 (6.8)	−17.5 (0.5)	−14.0 (6.8)	−6.5 (20.3)	−1.5 (29.3)	3.0 (37.4)	4.0 (39.2)	4.0 (39.2)	−0.5 (31.1)	−4.5 (23.9)	−10.0 (14.0)	−12.5 (9.5)	−17.5 (0.5)
Average precipitation mm (inches)	124.6 (4.91)	102.4 (4.03)	97.8 (3.85)	131.8 (5.19)	127.9 (5.04)	95.5 (3.76)	71.4 (2.81)	67.9 (2.67)	81.6 (3.21)	94.5 (3.72)	146.4 (5.76)	116.1 (4.57)	1,257.9 (49.52)
Average precipitation days (≥ 1.0 mm)	11.7	10.7	11.2	13.8	12.9	10.6	8.3	8.8	9.1	10.8	12.4	10.8	131.1
Source: Meteociel

== Administration ==
List of Successive Mayors

From	To	Name
2001	2014	Georges Laïlle
2014	2026	Charles Daffis

== Demography ==
The inhabitants of the commune are known as Augirenois or Augirenoises in French.

Historical population

Year	Pop.	±% p.a.
1793	418	—
1821	489	+0.56%
1846	613	+0.91%
1872	547	−0.44%
1901	477	−0.47%
1926	259	−2.41%
1946	177	−1.89%
1962	109	−2.98%
1968	92	−2.79%

Year	Pop.	±% p.a.
1975	59	−6.15%
1982	50	−2.34%
1990	73	+4.84%
1999	73	+0.00%
2007	62	−2.02%
2012	66	+1.26%
2017	76	+2.86%
2023	80	+0.86%

Source: EHESS and INSEE

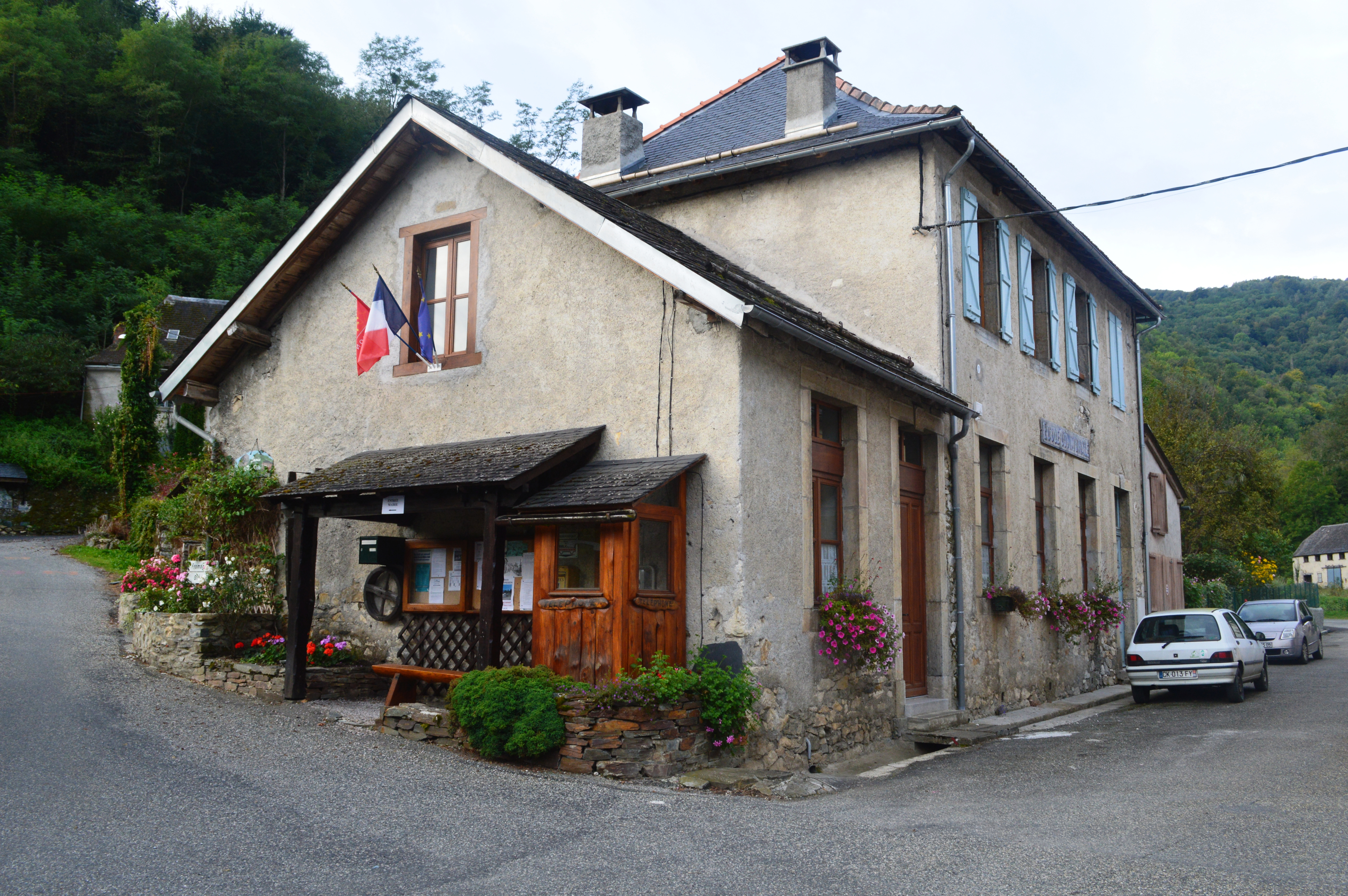
Augirein Town Hall

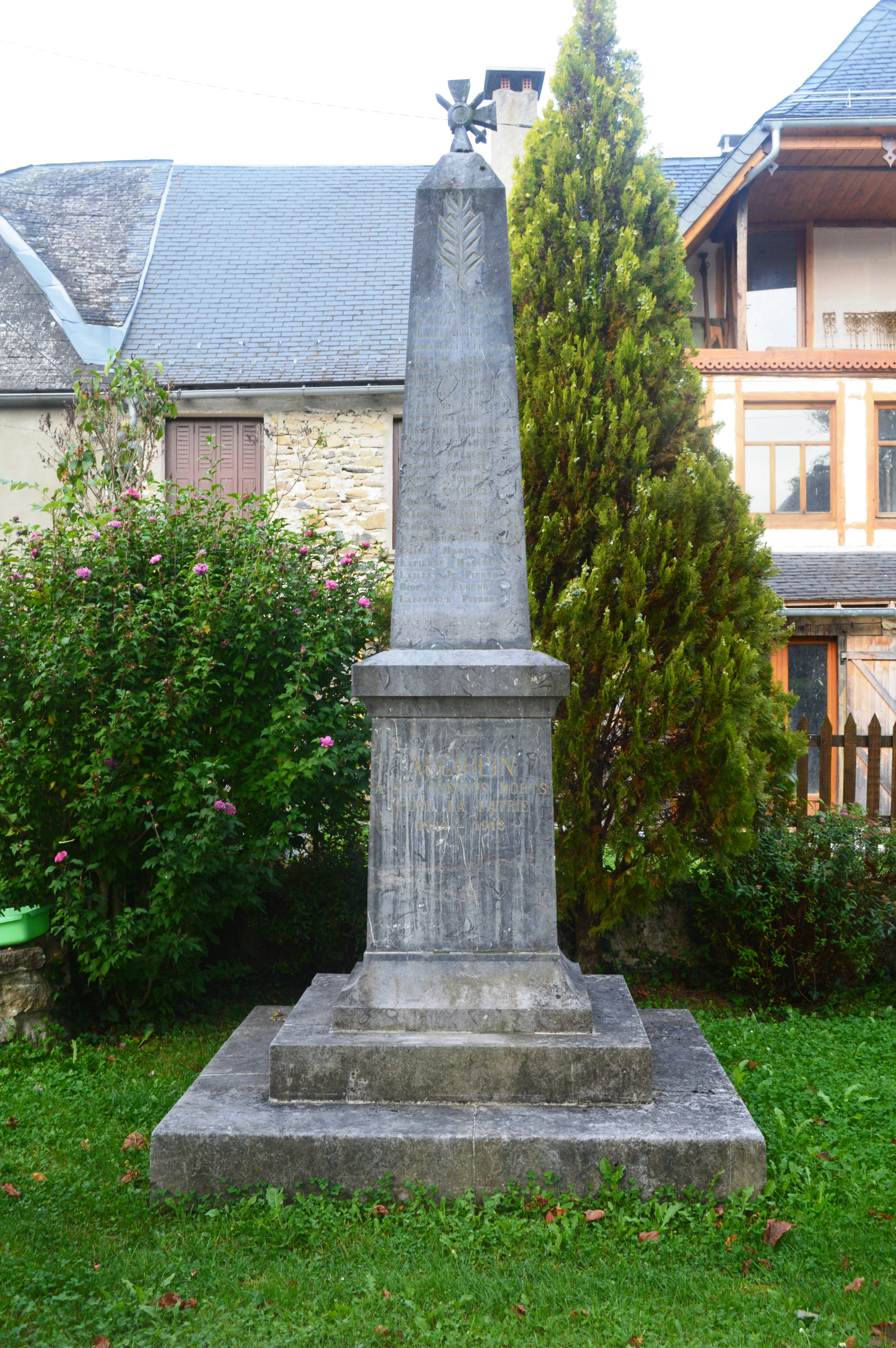
Augirein War Memorial

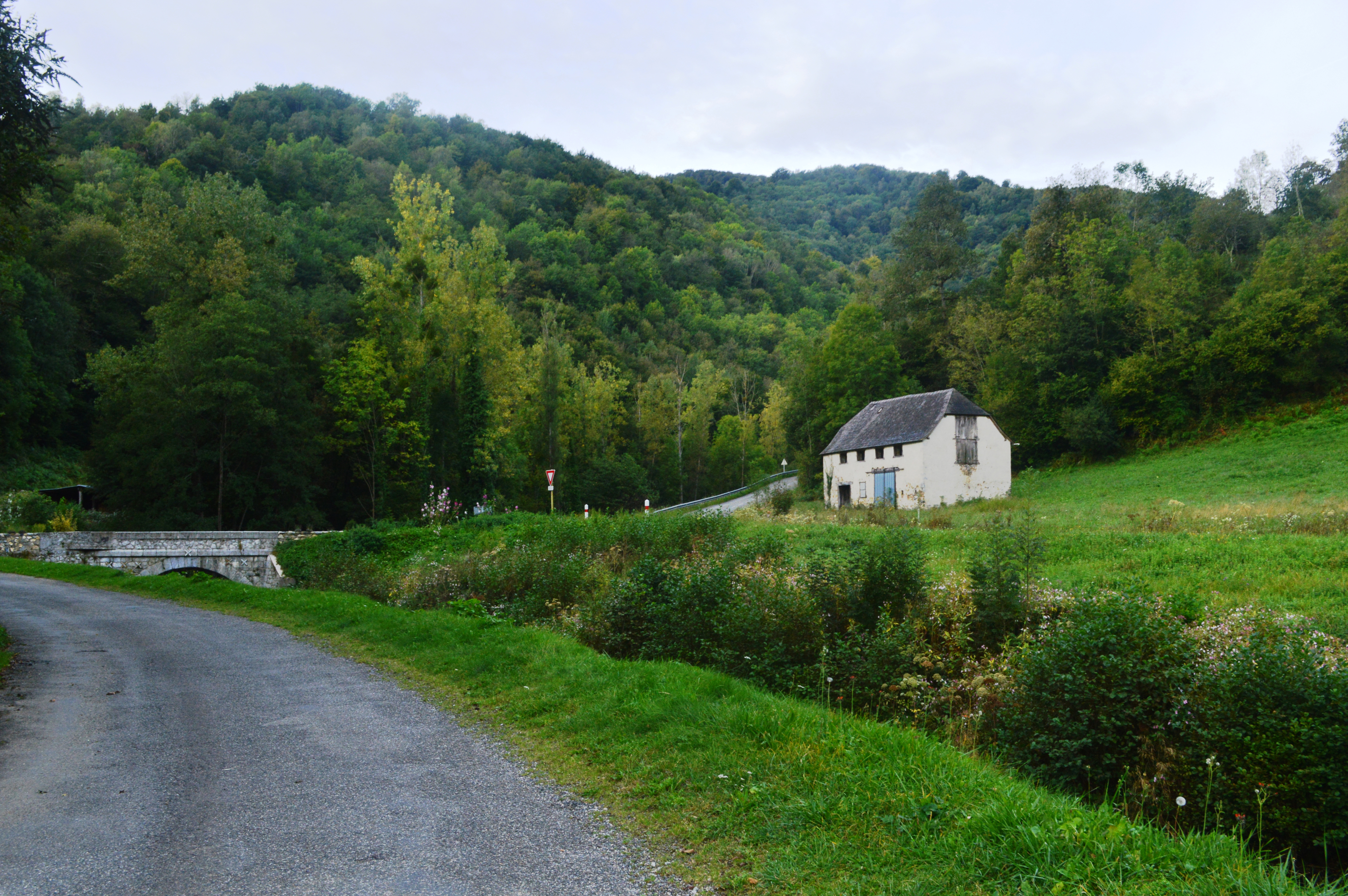
Augirein Countryside

== Sites and monuments ==
The Church contains a Chalice (19th century) which is registered as a historical object.

== See also ==
- Communes of the Ariège department
