= Balacet =

Commune in Occitanie, France

- Commune
- Location of Balacet
- Location within France Location within Occitanie
- Coordinates: 42°53′06″N 0°58′56″E
- Country: France
- Region: Occitania
- Department: Ariège
- Arrondissement: Saint-Girons
- Canton: Couserans Ouest

Government
  - Mayor (2020–2026): Anselme Poignant
- Area^{1}: 2.12 km^{2} (0.82 sq mi)
- Elevation: 906 m (2,972 ft)
- Highest elevation: 1,674 m (5,492 ft)
- Lowest elevation: 833 m (2,733 ft)
- Population (2023): 51
  - Density: 24/km^{2} (62/sq mi)
- Time zone: UTC+01:00 (CET)
  - Summer (DST): UTC+02:00 (CEST)
- INSEE/Postal code: 09034 /09800
- ^{1} French Land Register data, which excludes lakes, ponds, glaciers > 1 km^{2} (0.386 sq mi or 247 acres) and river estuaries.

Balacet (French pronunciation: [balasɛ]) is a commune in the Ariège department in the Occitanie region of south-western France.

== Geography ==
Balacet is located some 8 km south-west of Audressein and 3 km north-east of Sentein in the Biros Valley. Access to the commune is by the tortuous D704 road which branches from the D4 just west of Lascoux and goes to the village then continues east to Uchentein. There is also another road that goes west from the village to Irazein. The commune is a rugged mountain commune which is heavily forested.

== Administration ==
List of Successive Mayors

From	To	Name
2001	2008	Gilbert Birbes
2008	2014	André Marran
2014	2020	Antoine Duburcq
2020	2026	Anselme Poignant

== Demography ==
The inhabitants of the commune are known as Balacetois or Balacetoises in French.

Historical population

Year	Pop.	±% p.a.
1793	83	—
1821	126	+1.50%
1846	108	−0.61%
1872	116	+0.28%
1901	107	−0.28%
1926	65	−1.97%
1946	29	−3.96%
1962	30	+0.21%
1968	29	−0.56%

Year	Pop.	±% p.a.
1975	26	−1.55%
1982	14	−8.46%
1990	10	−4.12%
1999	24	+10.22%
2007	19	−2.88%
2012	17	−2.20%
2017	26	+8.87%
2023	51	+11.88%

Source: EHESS and INSEE

== Religious heritage ==
The Parish Church contains several items that are registered as historical objects:

- A Pyx of "malades-chrismatoire" (13th century)
- A Ciborium (19th century)
- 2 Candlesticks (18th century)
- An Altar, Retable, and Tabernacle (18th century)
- A Chalice (17th century)
- A Carving: Chrisme (12th century)

== See also ==
- Communes of the Ariège department
