= Sor, Ariège =

Commune in Occitanie, France

Sor
- Commune
- Location of Sor
- Location within France Location within Occitanie
- Coordinates: 42°55′16″N 1°00′38″E
- Country: France
- Region: Occitania
- Department: Ariège
- Arrondissement: Saint-Girons
- Canton: Couserans Ouest

Government
  - Mayor (2020–2026): Aline Gence
- Area^{1}: 1.08 km^{2} (0.42 sq mi)
- Elevation: 600 m (2,000 ft)
- Highest elevation: 760 m (2,490 ft)
- Lowest elevation: 520 m (1,710 ft)
- Population (2023): 29
  - Density: 27/km^{2} (70/sq mi)
- Time zone: UTC+01:00 (CET)
  - Summer (DST): UTC+02:00 (CEST)
- INSEE/Postal code: 09297 /09800
- ^{1} French Land Register data, which excludes lakes, ponds, glaciers > 1 km^{2} (0.386 sq mi or 247 acres) and river estuaries.

Sor (French pronunciation: [sɔʁ]; Occitan: Sòr) is a commune in the Ariège department in southwestern France.

== Population ==
Inhabitants of Sor are called Sorais in French.

Historical population
Year	Pop.	±% p.a.
1968	21	—
1975	22	+0.67%
1982	23	+0.64%
1990	28	+2.49%
1999	33	+1.84%
2007	31	−0.78%
2012	33	+1.26%
2017	29	−2.55%
2023	29	+0.00%
Source: INSEE

== See also ==
- Communes of the Ariège department
