= Montégut-en-Couserans =

Commune in Occitanie, France

- Commune
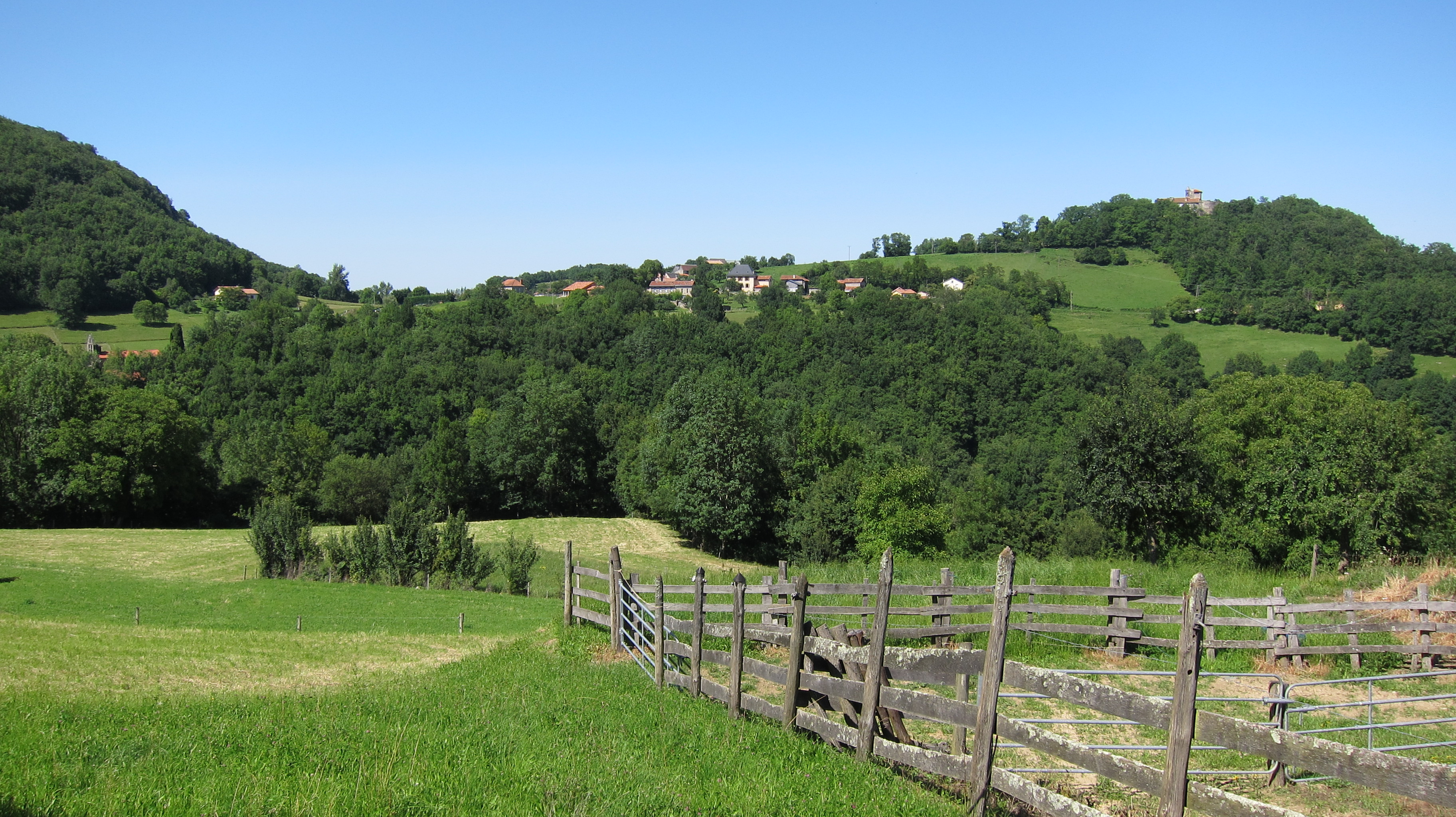
- Montégut-en-Couserans seen from Ussau
- Location of Montégut-en-Couserans
- Location within France Location within Occitanie
- Coordinates: 42°58′56″N 1°05′42″E
- Country: France
- Region: Occitania
- Department: Ariège
- Arrondissement: Saint-Girons
- Canton: Couserans Ouest

Government
  - Mayor (2020–2026): Henri Pouches
- Area^{1}: 6.18 km^{2} (2.39 sq mi)
- Elevation: 500 m (1,600 ft)
- Highest elevation: 880 m (2,890 ft)
- Lowest elevation: 403 m (1,322 ft)
- Population (2023): 70
  - Density: 11/km^{2} (29/sq mi)
- Time zone: UTC+01:00 (CET)
  - Summer (DST): UTC+02:00 (CEST)
- INSEE/Postal code: 09201 /09200
- ^{1} French Land Register data, which excludes lakes, ponds, glaciers > 1 km^{2} (0.386 sq mi or 247 acres) and river estuaries.

Montégut-en-Couserans (French pronunciation: [mɔ̃teɡy ɑ̃ kuzʁɑ̃], literally Montégut in Couserans; Occitan: Montagut de Coserans, before 1962: Montégut) is a commune in the Ariège department in southwestern France.

== Population ==
Historical population
Year	Pop.	±% p.a.
1968	84	—
1975	63	−4.03%
1982	51	−2.97%
1990	55	+0.95%
1999	67	+2.22%
2007	70	+0.55%
2012	66	−1.17%
2017	76	+2.86%
2023	70	−1.36%
Source: INSEE

== See also ==
- Communes of the Ariège department
