= Buzan, Ariège =

Commune in Occitanie, France

Buzan
- Commune
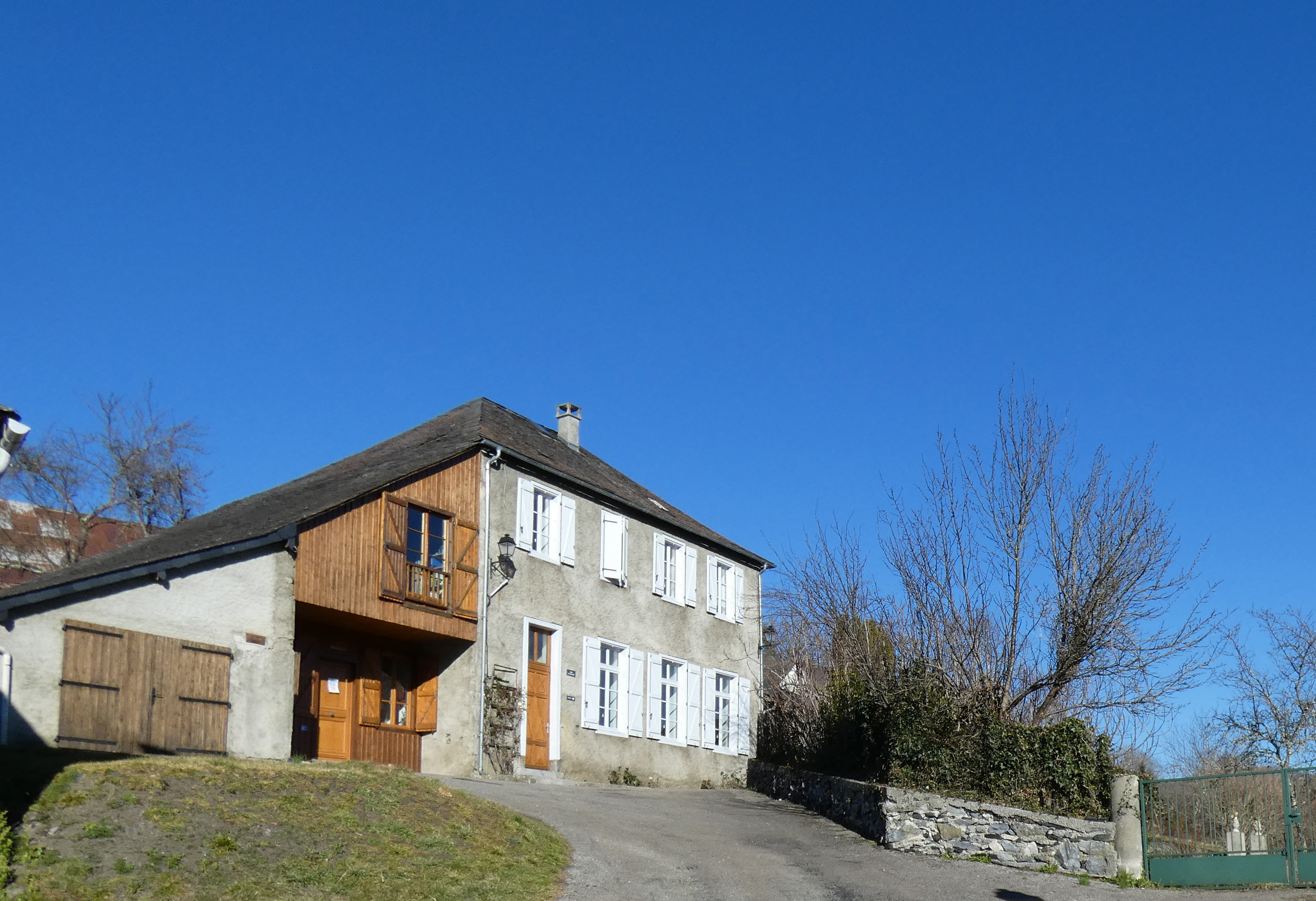
- Town hall
- Location of Buzan
- Location within France Location within Occitanie
- Coordinates: 42°56′34″N 0°57′50″E
- Country: France
- Region: Occitania
- Department: Ariège
- Arrondissement: Saint-Girons
- Canton: Couserans Ouest
- Intercommunality: Couserans-Pyrénées

Government
  - Mayor (2023–2026): Françoise Gachein
- Area^{1}: 8.55 km^{2} (3.30 sq mi)
- Elevation: 700 m (2,300 ft)
- Highest elevation: 1,371 m (4,498 ft)
- Lowest elevation: 600 m (2,000 ft)
- Population (2023): 47
  - Density: 5.5/km^{2} (14/sq mi)
- Time zone: UTC+01:00 (CET)
  - Summer (DST): UTC+02:00 (CEST)
- INSEE/Postal code: 09069 /09800
- ^{1} French Land Register data, which excludes lakes, ponds, glaciers > 1 km^{2} (0.386 sq mi or 247 acres) and river estuaries.

Buzan (French pronunciation: [byzɑ̃]; Occitan: Busanh) is a commune in the Ariège department of southwestern France.

== Population ==
Historical population
Year	Pop.	±% p.a.
1968	64	—
1975	53	−2.66%
1982	51	−0.55%
1990	50	−0.25%
1999	43	−1.66%
2007	25	−6.55%
2012	28	+2.29%
2017	29	+0.70%
2023	47	+8.38%
Source: INSEE

== See also ==
- Communes of the Ariège department
