= Argein =

Commune in Occitanie, France

- Commune
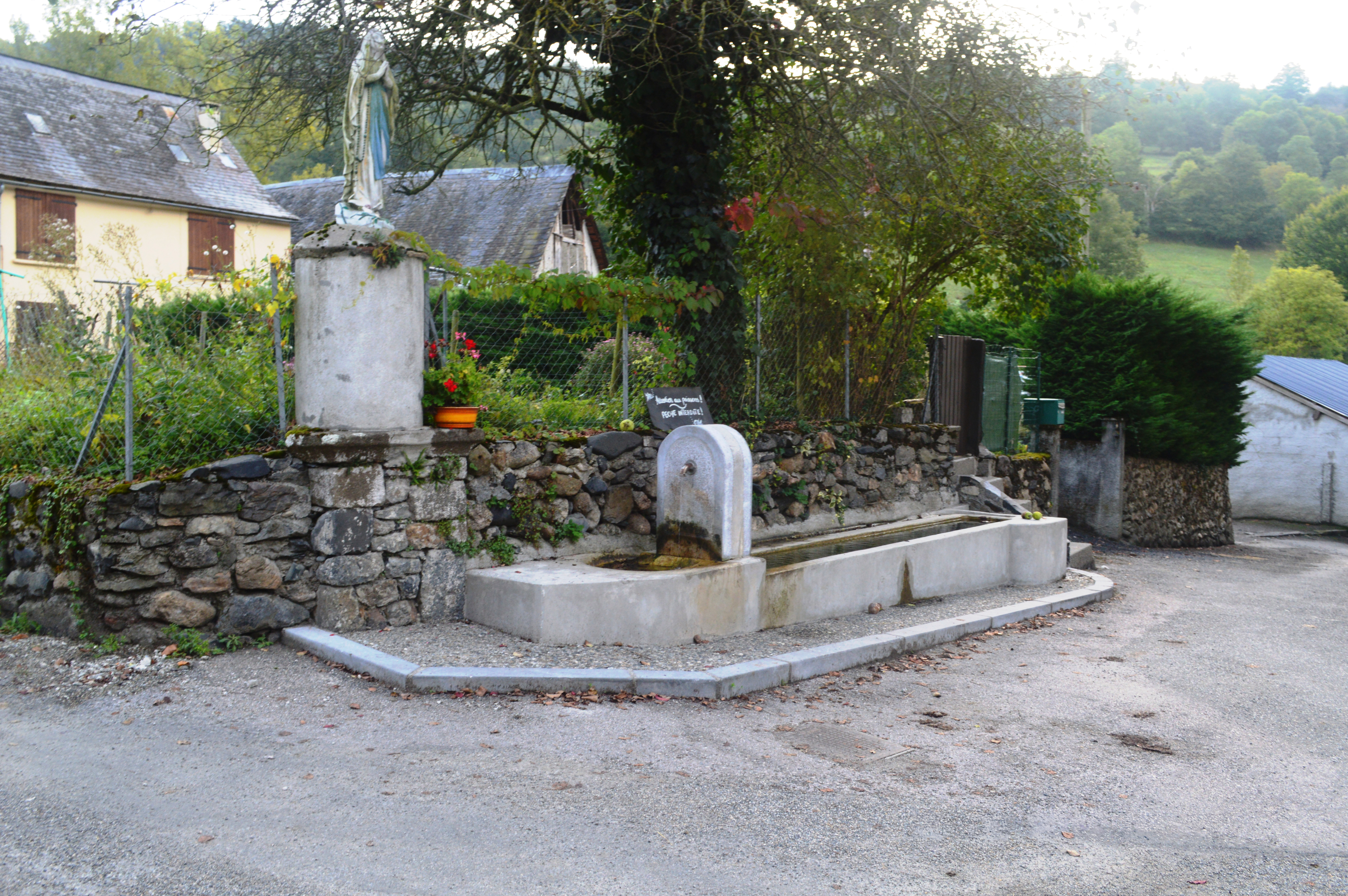
- The drinking trough in Argein
- Location of Argein
- Location within France Location within Occitanie
- Coordinates: 42°55′56″N 0°59′36″E
- Country: France
- Region: Occitania
- Department: Ariège
- Arrondissement: Saint-Girons
- Canton: Couserans Ouest

Government
  - Mayor (2020–2026): Denis Lourde
- Area^{1}: 11.09 km^{2} (4.28 sq mi)
- Elevation: 534 m (1,752 ft)
- Highest elevation: 1,675 m (5,495 ft)
- Lowest elevation: 517 m (1,696 ft)
- Population (2023): 195
  - Density: 17.6/km^{2} (45.5/sq mi)
- Time zone: UTC+01:00 (CET)
  - Summer (DST): UTC+02:00 (CEST)
- INSEE/Postal code: 09014 /09800
- ^{1} French Land Register data, which excludes lakes, ponds, glaciers > 1 km^{2} (0.386 sq mi or 247 acres) and river estuaries.

Argein (French pronunciation: [aʁʒɛ̃]; Occitan: Argenh) is a commune in the Ariège department in the Occitanie region of south-western France.

== Geography ==
Argein is located some 12 km south-west of Saint-Girons just a kilometre west of Audressein. Access to the commune is by the D618 road from Audressein in the east passing through the centre of the commune and the village and continuing west to Aucazein. Apart from the village there is also the hamlet of Viellot. The centre of the commune is the valley of the Bouigane oriented east–west where the village lies. In the valley there is some farmland however the rugged north and south of the commune is heavily forested.

The Buouigane river flows along the central valley east to join the Léz at Audressein. Some tributaries rise in the commune to join the Bouigane including the Ruisseau d'Auriech and the Ruisseau de Sol.

== Administration ==
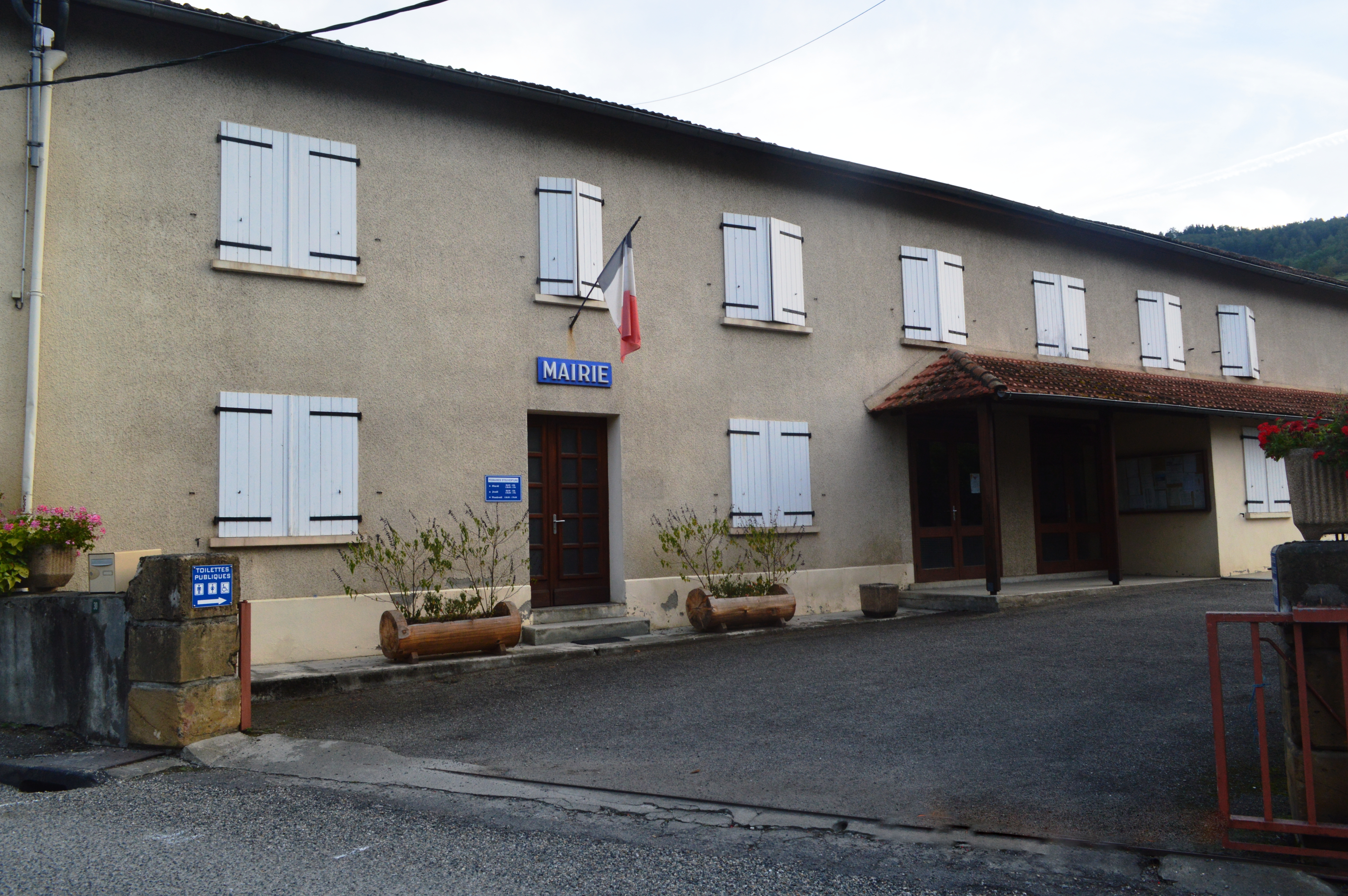
The Town Hall

List of Successive Mayors

Mayors from the French Revolution to 1929

From	To	Name	Party	Position
1791	1792	Jacques Bataille		
1792	1796	Jacques Fourment		
1796	1802	Jean Doumenc		
1802	1811	Jean Argela		
1811	1813	Jean Doumenc		
1813	1830	Jean Argela		
1830	1837	Jean Bourdeau		
1837	1847	Bernard Doumenc		
1847	1857	Gaudens de Meritens de Roses		
1857	1870	André Tap		
1870	1899	Jean-Pierre Ille		
1899	1904	Jean Ferre		
1904	1915	Pierre Pujol		
1915	1919	François Bauby		
1919	1929	Michel Ferre		

Mayors from 1929

From	To	Name
1929	1945	François Dedieu
1945	1965	Guillaume Ortet
1965	1971	Jean Delbert
1971	1977	François Bauby
1977	2001	Guy Dubuc
2001	2012	Raymond Junca
2012	2026	Denis Lourde

== Demography ==
The inhabitants of the commune are known as Argenois or Argenoises in French.

Historical population

Year	Pop.	±% p.a.
1793	632	—
1821	636	+0.02%
1846	881	+1.31%
1872	784	−0.45%
1901	583	−1.02%
1926	373	−1.77%
1946	271	−1.58%
1962	235	−0.89%
1968	214	−1.55%

Year	Pop.	±% p.a.
1975	211	−0.20%
1982	193	−1.27%
1990	164	−2.01%
1999	149	−1.06%
2007	162	+1.05%
2012	186	+2.80%
2017	194	+0.85%
2023	195	+0.09%

Source: EHESS and INSEE

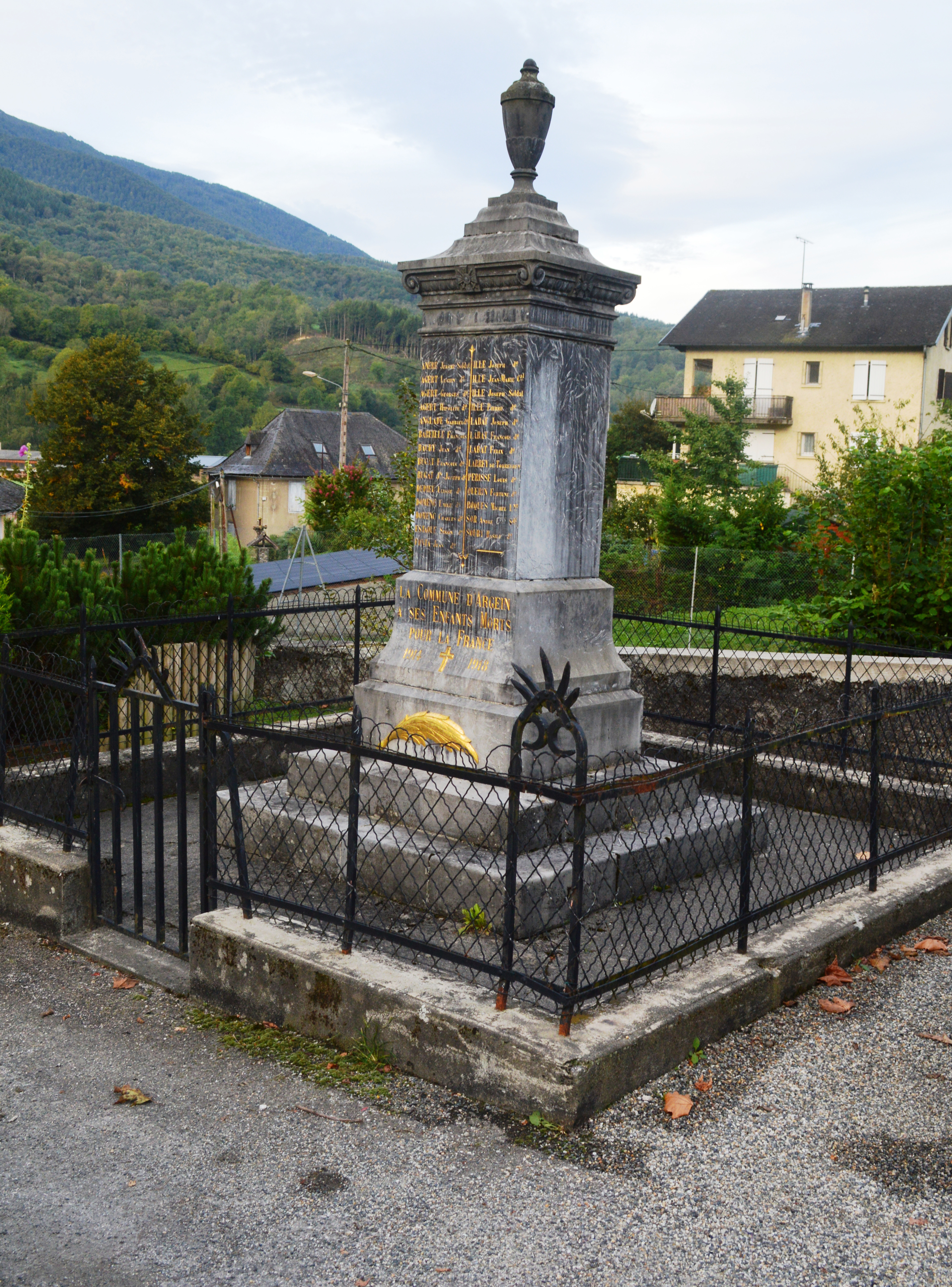
Argein War Memorial

== Sites and Monuments ==
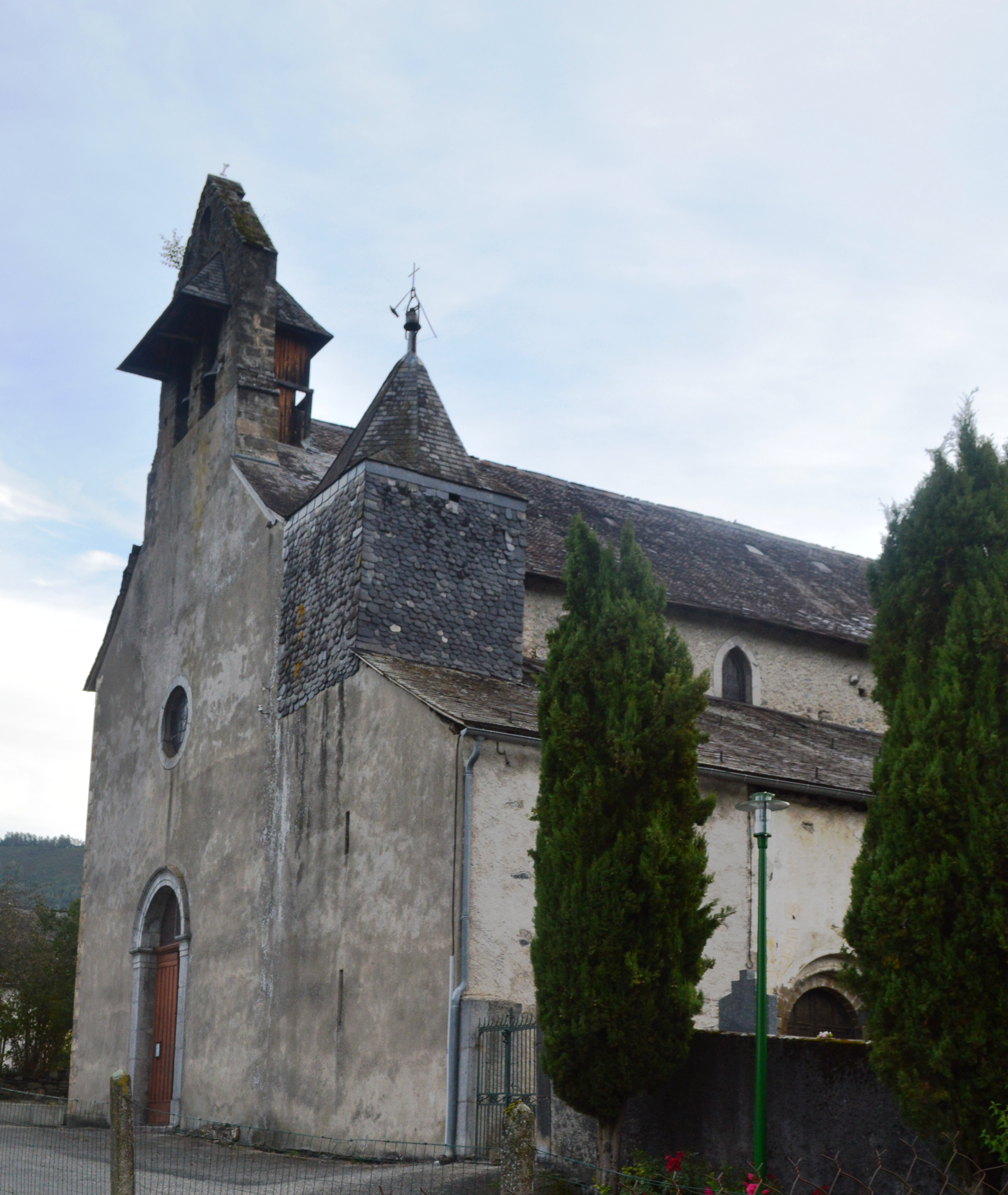
The Parish Church of Saint Peter

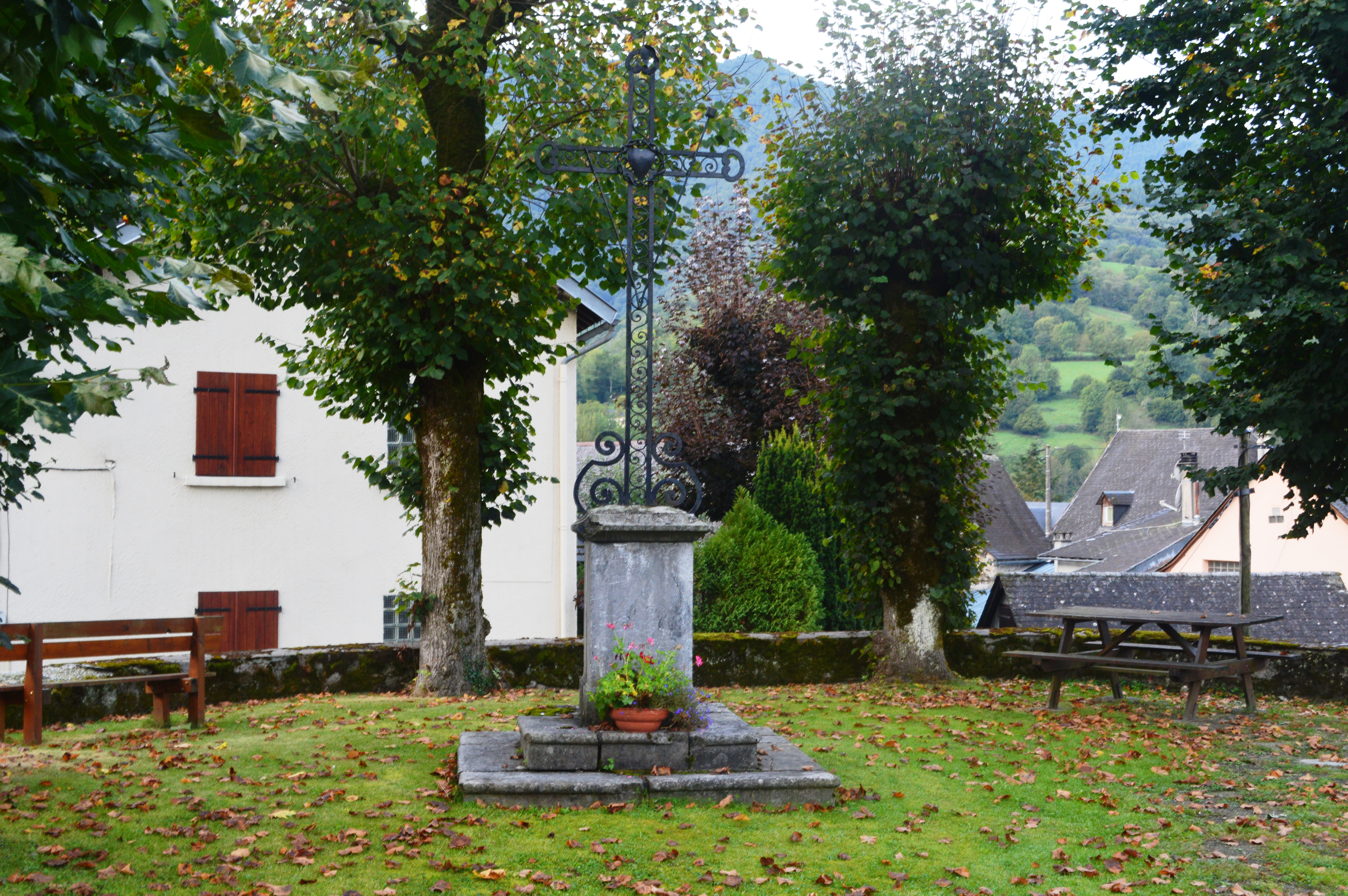
A Wayside Cross in Argein

The Parish Church of Saint Peter is an old Romanesque church from the 12th century and now an integral part of a church originally built in the 9th century. The original semicircular Apse forms the south aisle of the present building. There is an altar bearing a very ancient inscription (prior to the 4th century) depicted again in the south wall of the church. The Church contains many items that are registered as historical objects:

- 2 Altar Candlesticks (17th century)
- 2 Collection Plates (16th century)
- A Thurible (17th century)
- A Ciborium (1638)
- A Chalice (17th century)
- A Chalice with Paten (16th century)
- A Statue: Saint Peter (18th century)
- A Tabernacle (18th century)
- An Altar, Retable, and Altar Dais (18th century)
- A Monumental Painting on the southern exterior facade and interior walls (17th century)

== Notable people linked to the commune ==
- Honoré Laffont, born 6 October 1901 at Argein and died on 14 February 1975. An international Rugby player (1st time in 1926 against Wales). He was twice a finalist in the championship of France with RC Narbonne (1932 and 1933). He played scrum half (1.65m, 62 kg). He was also coach for RC Narbonne.

== See also ==
- Communes of the Ariège department
