= Eycheil =

Commune in Occitanie, France

- Commune
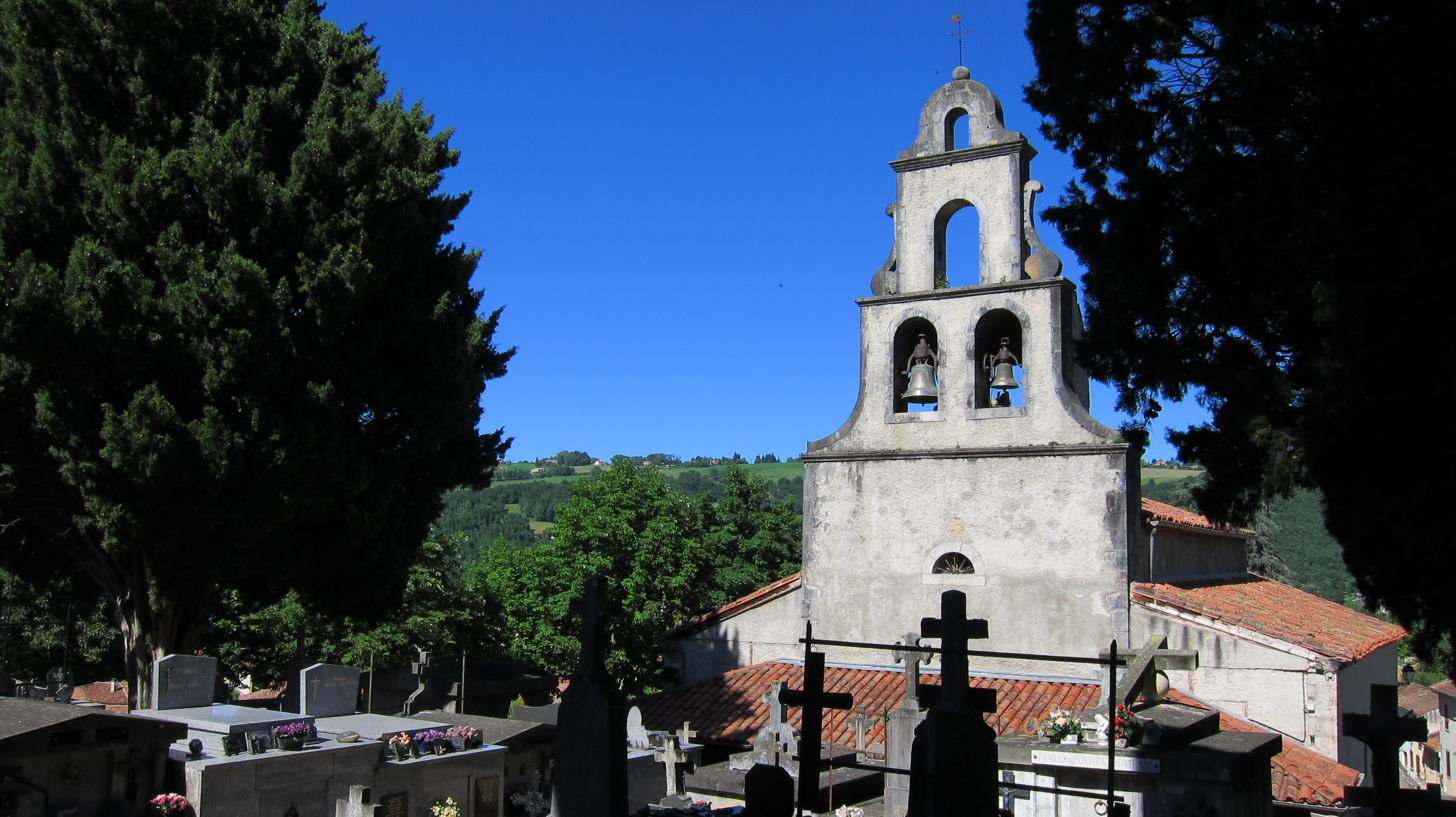
- The church in Eycheil
- Location of Eycheil
- Location within France Location within Occitanie
- Coordinates: 42°58′11″N 1°09′49″E
- Country: France
- Region: Occitania
- Department: Ariège
- Arrondissement: Saint-Girons
- Canton: Couserans Ouest

Government
  - Mayor (2020–2026): Eric Desbiaux
- Area^{1}: 4.77 km^{2} (1.84 sq mi)
- Elevation: 390 m (1,280 ft)
- Highest elevation: 1,240 m (4,070 ft)
- Lowest elevation: 402 m (1,319 ft)
- Population (2023): 522
  - Density: 109/km^{2} (283/sq mi)
- Time zone: UTC+01:00 (CET)
  - Summer (DST): UTC+02:00 (CEST)
- INSEE/Postal code: 09119 /09200
- ^{1} French Land Register data, which excludes lakes, ponds, glaciers > 1 km^{2} (0.386 sq mi or 247 acres) and river estuaries.

Eycheil (French pronunciation: [ejʃɛj]; Occitan: Eishèlh) is a commune in the Ariège department in southwestern France.

== Population ==
Historical population
Year	Pop.	±% p.a.
1968	604	—
1975	601	−0.07%
1982	554	−1.16%
1990	543	−0.25%
1999	500	−0.91%
2007	518	+0.44%
2012	573	+2.04%
2017	550	−0.82%
2023	522	−0.87%
Source: INSEE

== See also ==
- Communes of the Ariège department
