= Engomer =

Commune in Occitanie, France

- Commune
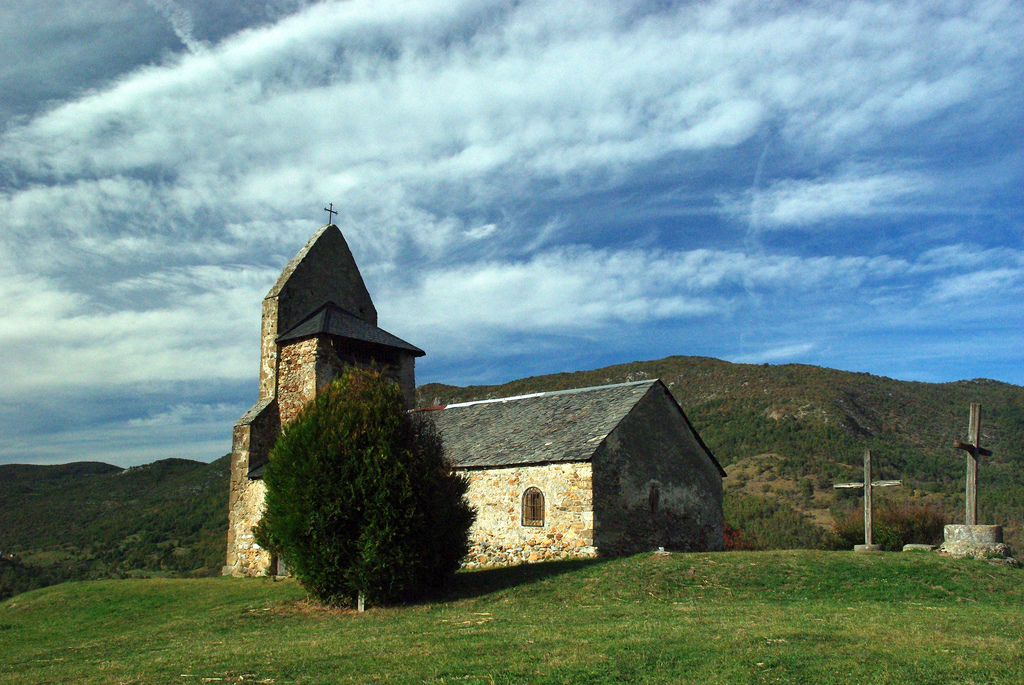
- The chapel in Engomer
- Location of Engomer
- Location within France Location within Occitanie
- Coordinates: 42°56′51″N 1°03′37″E
- Country: France
- Region: Occitania
- Department: Ariège
- Arrondissement: Saint-Girons
- Canton: Couserans Ouest

Government
  - Mayor (2020–2026): Jean-Claude Le Hir
- Area^{1}: 7.6 km^{2} (2.9 sq mi)
- Elevation: 462 m (1,516 ft)
- Highest elevation: 1,120 m (3,670 ft)
- Lowest elevation: 448 m (1,470 ft)
- Population (2023): 315
  - Density: 41/km^{2} (110/sq mi)
- Time zone: UTC+01:00 (CET)
  - Summer (DST): UTC+02:00 (CEST)
- INSEE/Postal code: 09111 /09800
- ^{1} French Land Register data, which excludes lakes, ponds, glaciers > 1 km^{2} (0.386 sq mi or 247 acres) and river estuaries.

Engomer is a commune in the Ariège department in southwestern France.

== Population ==
Inhabitants are called Engomerois in French.

Historical population
Year	Pop.	±% p.a.
1968	326	—
1975	318	−0.35%
1982	321	+0.13%
1990	293	−1.13%
1999	257	−1.45%
2007	275	+0.85%
2012	275	+0.00%
2017	297	+1.55%
2023	315	+0.99%
Source: INSEE

== See also ==
- Communes of the Ariège department
