= Villeneuve, Ariège =

Commune in Occitanie, France

Villeneuve
- Commune
- Location of Villeneuve
- Location within France Location within Occitanie
- Coordinates: 42°56′21″N 0°58′57″E
- Country: France
- Region: Occitania
- Department: Ariège
- Arrondissement: Saint-Girons
- Canton: Couserans Ouest

Government
  - Mayor (2020–2026): Serge Laffont
- Area^{1}: 5 km^{2} (1.9 sq mi)
- Elevation: 680 m (2,230 ft)
- Highest elevation: 1,129 m (3,704 ft)
- Lowest elevation: 546 m (1,791 ft)
- Population (2023): 42
  - Density: 8.4/km^{2} (22/sq mi)
- Time zone: UTC+01:00 (CET)
  - Summer (DST): UTC+02:00 (CEST)
- INSEE/Postal code: 09335 /09800
- ^{1} French Land Register data, which excludes lakes, ponds, glaciers > 1 km^{2} (0.386 sq mi or 247 acres) and river estuaries.

Villeneuve (French pronunciation: [vilnœv]; Occitan: Vièlanava) is a commune in the Ariège department in southwestern France.

== Population ==
Inhabitants of Villeneuve are called Villeneuvais in French.

Historical population
Year	Pop.	±% p.a.
1968	60	—
1975	50	−2.57%
1982	34	−5.36%
1990	32	−0.75%
1999	43	+3.34%
2007	36	−2.20%
2012	42	+3.13%
2017	36	−3.04%
2023	42	+2.60%
Source: INSEE

== See also ==
- Communes of the Ariège department
