= Saint-Jean-du-Castillonnais =

Commune in Occitanie, France

- Commune
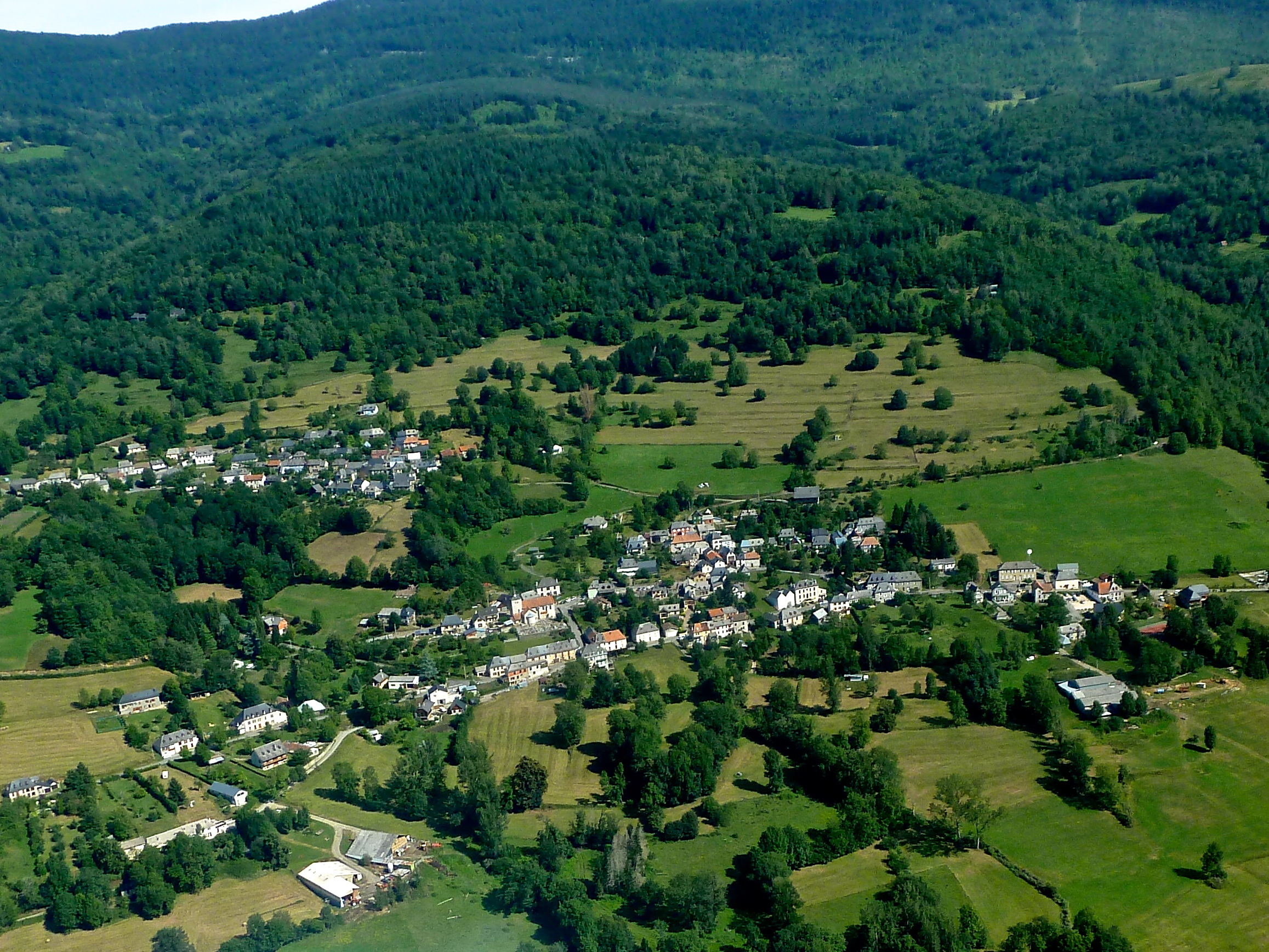
- An aerial view of Orgibet and Saint-Jean-du-Castillonnais
- Location of Saint-Jean-du-Castillonnais
- Location within France Location within Occitanie
- Coordinates: 42°56′12″N 0°55′55″E
- Country: France
- Region: Occitania
- Department: Ariège
- Arrondissement: Saint-Girons
- Canton: Couserans Ouest

Government
  - Mayor (2024–2026): Marion Sablayrolles
- Area^{1}: 4.74 km^{2} (1.83 sq mi)
- Elevation: 710 m (2,330 ft)
- Highest elevation: 1,416 m (4,646 ft)
- Lowest elevation: 633 m (2,077 ft)
- Population (2023): 33
  - Density: 7.0/km^{2} (18/sq mi)
- Time zone: UTC+01:00 (CET)
  - Summer (DST): UTC+02:00 (CEST)
- INSEE/Postal code: 09263 /09800
- ^{1} French Land Register data, which excludes lakes, ponds, glaciers > 1 km^{2} (0.386 sq mi or 247 acres) and river estuaries.

Saint-Jean-du-Castillonnais (French pronunciation: [sɛ̃ ʒɑ̃ dy kastijone]; Occitan: Sent Joanh deth Castilhonés) is a commune in the Ariège department in southwestern France.

== Population ==
Historical population
Year	Pop.	±% p.a.
1968	31	—
1975	46	+5.80%
1982	33	−4.63%
1990	20	−6.07%
1999	22	+1.06%
2007	25	+1.61%
2012	26	+0.79%
2017	23	−2.42%
2023	33	+6.20%
Source: INSEE

Inhabitants are called Saint-Jeantois in French.

== See also ==
- Communes of the Ariège department
