= Canton of Couserans Ouest =

Coordinates: 42.98°N 1.14°E

- Canton
- Situation of the canton of Couserans Ouest in the department of Ariège
- Country: France
- Region: Occitania
- Department: Ariège
- No. of communes: {{{nbcomm}}}
- Population (2023): 10,662
- INSEE code: 0904

The canton of Couserans Ouest is an administrative division of the Ariège department, southern France. It was created at the French canton reorganisation which came into effect in March 2015. Its seat is in Saint-Girons.

It consists of the following communes:

1. Antras
2. Argein
3. Arrien-en-Bethmale
4. Arrout
5. Aucazein
6. Audressein
7. Augirein
8. Balacet
9. Balaguères
10. Bethmale
11. Bonac-Irazein
12. Bordes-Uchentein
13. Buzan
14. Castillon-en-Couserans
15. Cescau
16. Engomer
17. Eycheil
18. Galey
19. Illartein
20. Montégut-en-Couserans
21. Moulis
22. Orgibet
23. Saint-Girons
24. Saint-Jean-du-Castillonnais
25. Saint-Lary
26. Salsein
27. Sentein
28. Sor
29. Villeneuve
