= Salsein =

Commune in Occitanie, France

- Commune
- Location of Salsein
- Location within France Location within Occitanie
- Coordinates: 42°54′37″N 1°00′28″E
- Country: France
- Region: Occitania
- Department: Ariège
- Arrondissement: Saint-Girons
- Canton: Couserans Ouest

Government
  - Mayor (2020–2026): Francis Pujol
- Area^{1}: 5.73 km^{2} (2.21 sq mi)
- Elevation: 750 m (2,460 ft)
- Highest elevation: 1,640 m (5,380 ft)
- Lowest elevation: 588 m (1,929 ft)
- Population (2023): 47
  - Density: 8.2/km^{2} (21/sq mi)
- Time zone: UTC+01:00 (CET)
  - Summer (DST): UTC+02:00 (CEST)
- INSEE/Postal code: 09279 /09800
- ^{1} French Land Register data, which excludes lakes, ponds, glaciers > 1 km^{2} (0.386 sq mi or 247 acres) and river estuaries.

Salsein (French pronunciation: [salsɛ̃]; Occitan: Salsenh) is a commune in the Ariège department in the Pyrenees, in southwestern France.

It is located close to Castillon-en-Couserans, about 17 km south-west of Saint-Girons. It is part of the Ariège Pyrenees regional natural park.

The terrain is mountainous. The Bach, Cazalus and Coudères streams run through Salsein.

== Population ==
Inhabitants of Salsein are called Salseinois in French.

Historical population
Year	Pop.	±% p.a.
1968	56	—
1975	42	−4.03%
1982	35	−2.57%
1990	30	−1.91%
1999	41	+3.53%
2007	46	+1.45%
2012	43	−1.34%
2017	44	+0.46%
2023	47	+1.11%
Source: INSEE

== See also ==
- Communes of the Ariège department
