= Illartein =

Commune in Occitanie, France

- Commune
- Location of Illartein
- Location within France Location within Occitanie
- Coordinates: 42°56′16″N 0°58′00″E
- Country: France
- Region: Occitania
- Department: Ariège
- Arrondissement: Saint-Girons
- Canton: Couserans Ouest

Government
  - Mayor (2021–2026): Dalia Dedieu
- Area^{1}: 3.97 km^{2} (1.53 sq mi)
- Elevation: 560 m (1,840 ft)
- Highest elevation: 1,721 m (5,646 ft)
- Lowest elevation: 555 m (1,821 ft)
- Population (2023): 73
  - Density: 18/km^{2} (48/sq mi)
- Time zone: UTC+01:00 (CET)
  - Summer (DST): UTC+02:00 (CEST)
- INSEE/Postal code: 09141 /09800
- ^{1} French Land Register data, which excludes lakes, ponds, glaciers > 1 km^{2} (0.386 sq mi or 247 acres) and river estuaries.

Illartein is a commune in the Ariège department in southwestern France.

== Population ==
Historical population
Year	Pop.	±% p.a.
1968	67	—
1975	60	−1.56%
1982	46	−3.72%
1990	54	+2.02%
1999	77	+4.02%
2007	73	−0.66%
2012	80	+1.85%
2017	73	−1.81%
2023	73	+0.00%
Source: INSEE

== See also ==
- Communes of the Ariège department
