= Galey =

Commune in Occitanie, France

- Commune
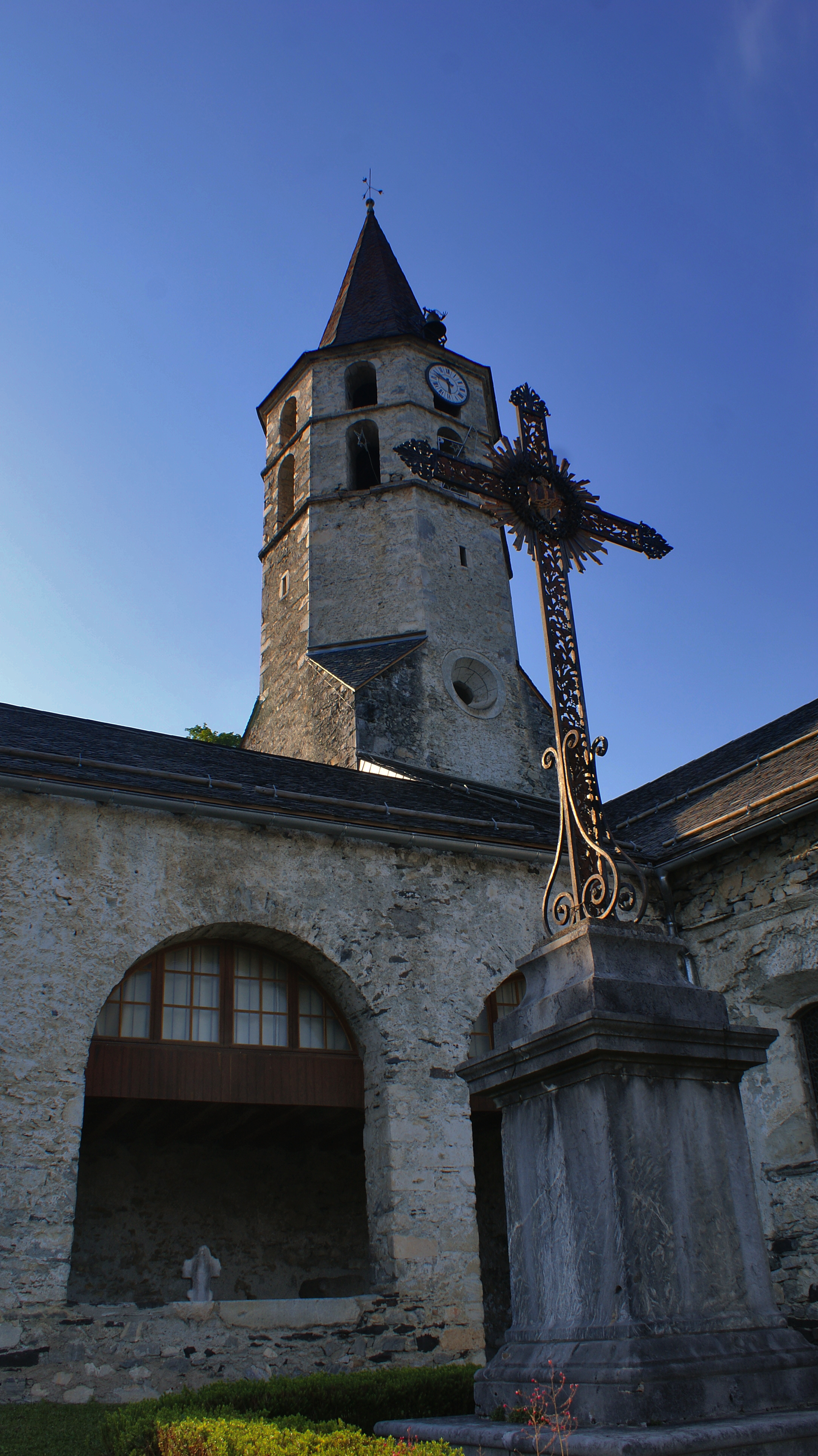
- The church in Galey
- Location of Galey
- Location within France Location within Occitanie
- Coordinates: 42°56′13″N 0°54′59″E
- Country: France
- Region: Occitania
- Department: Ariège
- Arrondissement: Saint-Girons
- Canton: Couserans Ouest
- Intercommunality: CC Couserans-Pyrénées

Government
  - Mayor (2020–2026): Laurence Bugat
- Area^{1}: 9.35 km^{2} (3.61 sq mi)
- Highest elevation: 1,566 m (5,138 ft)
- Lowest elevation: 636 m (2,087 ft)
- Population (2023): 114
  - Density: 12.2/km^{2} (31.6/sq mi)
- Time zone: UTC+01:00 (CET)
  - Summer (DST): UTC+02:00 (CEST)
- INSEE/Postal code: 09129 /09800
- ^{1} French Land Register data, which excludes lakes, ponds, glaciers > 1 km^{2} (0.386 sq mi or 247 acres) and river estuaries.

Galey (French pronunciation: [ɡalɛ]; Occitan: Galèi) is a commune in the Ariège department in southwestern France.

== Population ==
Historical population
Year	Pop.	±% p.a.
1968	131	—
1975	121	−1.13%
1982	114	−0.85%
1990	82	−4.03%
1999	101	+2.34%
2007	111	+1.19%
2012	109	−0.36%
2017	117	+1.43%
2023	114	−0.43%
Source: INSEE

== See also ==
- Communes of the Ariège department
