= Bonac-Irazein =

Commune in Occitanie, France

- Commune
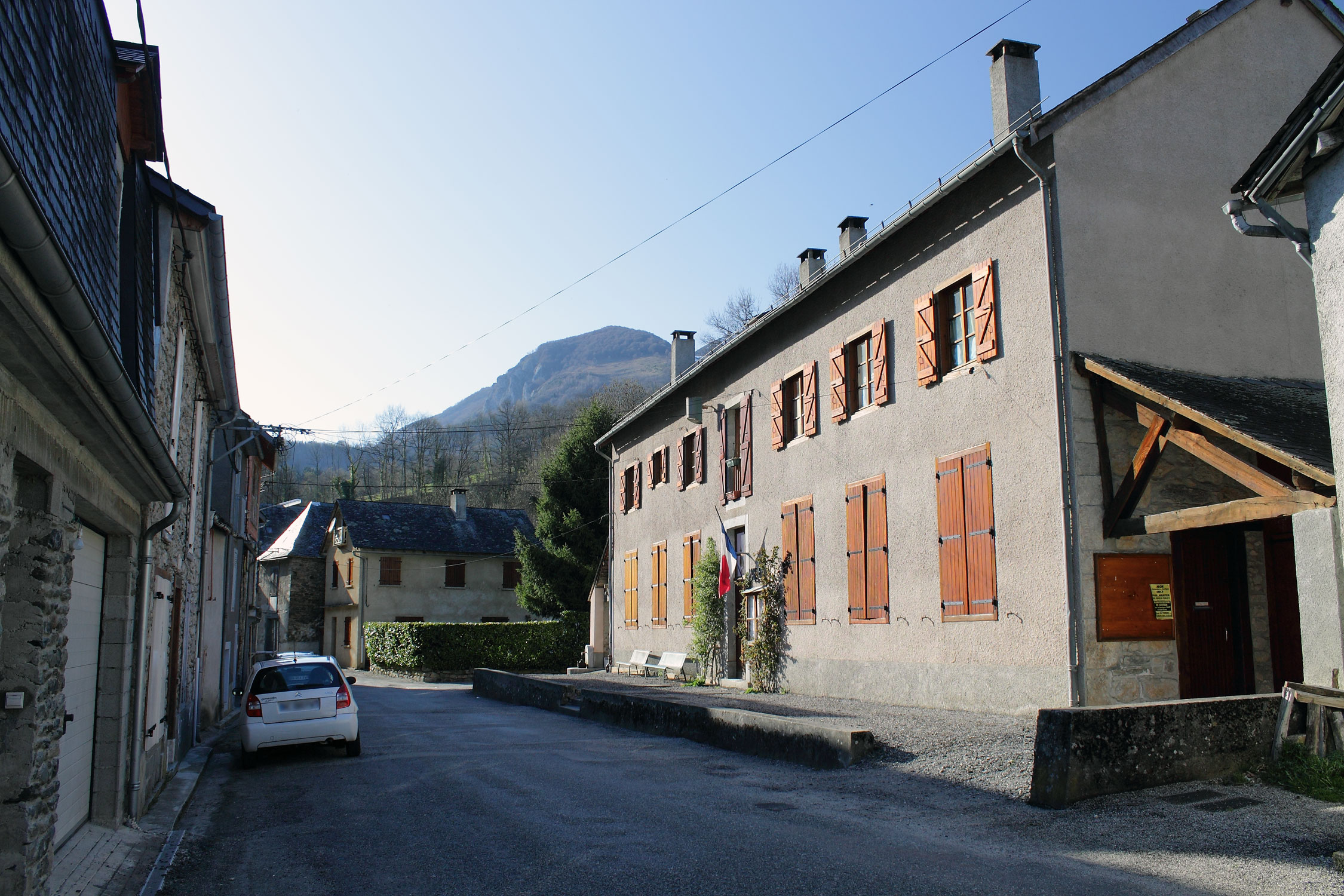
- Town hall
- Location of Bonac-Irazein
- Location within France Location within Occitanie
- Coordinates: 42°52′41″N 0°58′29″E
- Country: France
- Region: Occitania
- Department: Ariège
- Arrondissement: Saint-Girons
- Canton: Couserans Ouest

Government
  - Mayor (2020–2026): Nadine Nény
- Area^{1}: 38.13 km^{2} (14.72 sq mi)
- Elevation: 708 m (2,323 ft)
- Highest elevation: 2,750 m (9,020 ft)
- Lowest elevation: 672 m (2,205 ft)
- Population (2023): 126
  - Density: 3.30/km^{2} (8.56/sq mi)
- Time zone: UTC+01:00 (CET)
  - Summer (DST): UTC+02:00 (CEST)
- INSEE/Postal code: 09059 /09800
- ^{1} French Land Register data, which excludes lakes, ponds, glaciers > 1 km^{2} (0.386 sq mi or 247 acres) and river estuaries.

Bonac-Irazein (French pronunciation: [bɔnak iʁazɛ̃]) is a commune in the Ariège department of southwestern France.

== Population ==
Historical population
Year	Pop.	±% p.a.
1968	128	—
1975	87	−5.37%
1982	84	−0.50%
1990	61	−3.92%
1999	98	+5.41%
2007	138	+4.37%
2012	134	−0.59%
2017	119	−2.35%
2023	126	+0.96%
Source: INSEE

Inhabitants of Bonac-Irazein are called Bonacois in French.

== See also ==
- Communes of the Ariège department
