= Cescau, Ariège =

Administrative division in Occitanie, France

Cescau
- Commune
- Location of Cescau
- Location within France Location within Occitanie
- Coordinates: 42°55′56″N 1°02′24″E
- Country: France
- Region: Occitania
- Department: Ariège
- Arrondissement: Saint-Girons
- Canton: Couserans Ouest

Government
  - Mayor (2020–2026): Martine Huc
- Area^{1}: 5.32 km^{2} (2.05 sq mi)
- Elevation: 565 m (1,854 ft)
- Highest elevation: 1,107 m (3,632 ft)
- Lowest elevation: 480 m (1,570 ft)
- Population (2023): 163
  - Density: 30.6/km^{2} (79.4/sq mi)
- Time zone: UTC+01:00 (CET)
  - Summer (DST): UTC+02:00 (CEST)
- INSEE/Postal code: 09095 /09800
- ^{1} French Land Register data, which excludes lakes, ponds, glaciers > 1 km^{2} (0.386 sq mi or 247 acres) and river estuaries.

Cescau (French pronunciation: [sɛsko]) is a commune in the Ariège department in southwestern France.

== Population ==
Historical population
Year	Pop.	±% p.a.
1968	117	—
1975	100	−2.22%
1982	106	+0.84%
1990	90	−2.02%
1999	105	+1.73%
2007	134	+3.10%
2012	140	+0.88%
2017	141	+0.14%
2023	163	+2.45%
Source: INSEE

== See also ==
- Communes of the Ariège department
