= Orgibet =

Commune in Occitanie, France

- Commune
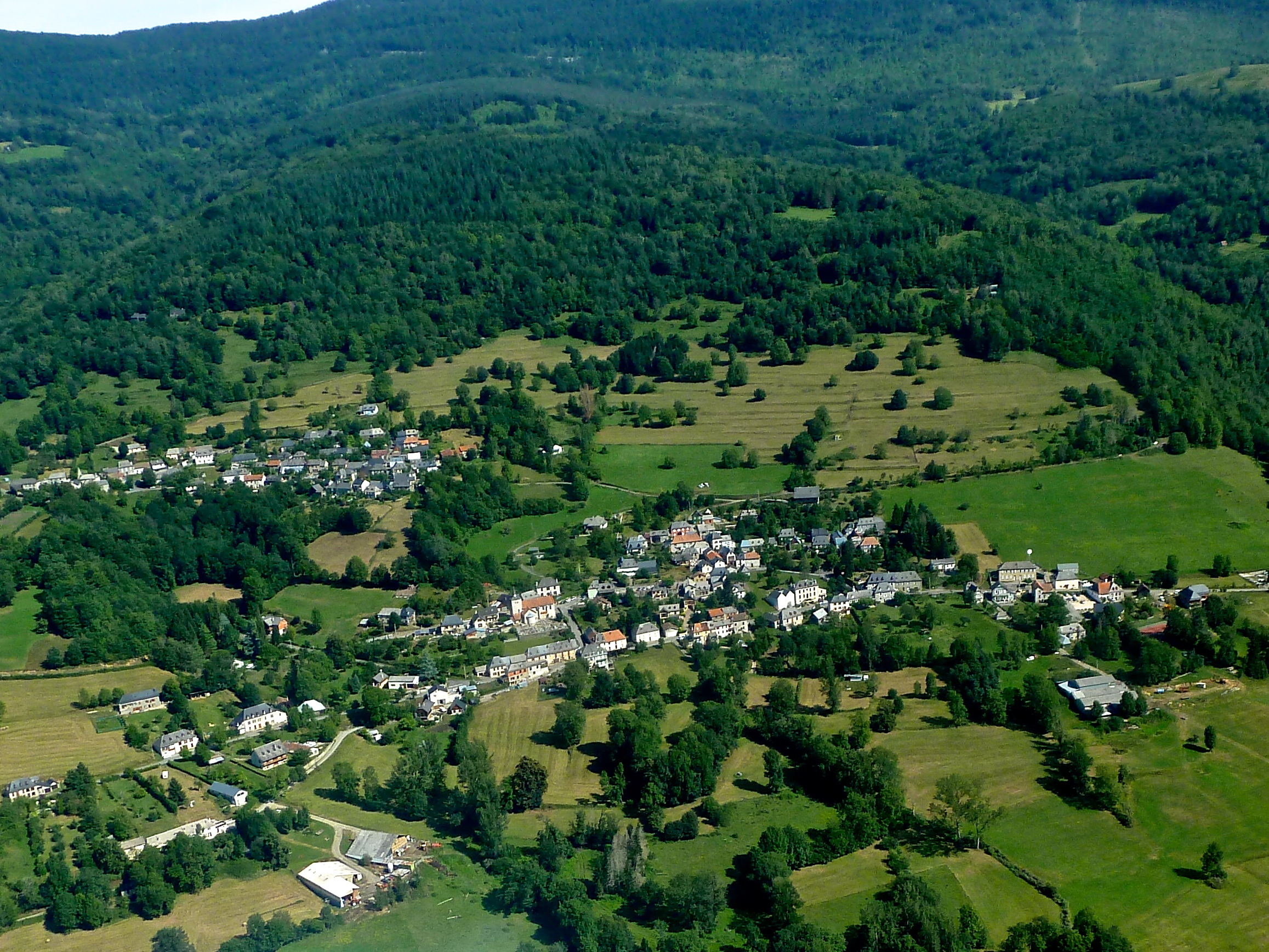
- Orgibet seen from above
- Location of Orgibet
- Location within France Location within Occitanie
- Coordinates: 42°56′05″N 0°56′11″E
- Country: France
- Region: Occitania
- Department: Ariège
- Arrondissement: Saint-Girons
- Canton: Couserans Ouest

Government
  - Mayor (2020–2026): Yvette Delclaux
- Area^{1}: 7.45 km^{2} (2.88 sq mi)
- Elevation: 670 m (2,200 ft)
- Highest elevation: 1,613 m (5,292 ft)
- Lowest elevation: 587 m (1,926 ft)
- Population (2023): 162
  - Density: 21.7/km^{2} (56.3/sq mi)
- Time zone: UTC+01:00 (CET)
  - Summer (DST): UTC+02:00 (CEST)
- INSEE/Postal code: 09219 /09800
- ^{1} French Land Register data, which excludes lakes, ponds, glaciers > 1 km^{2} (0.386 sq mi or 247 acres) and river estuaries.

Orgibet is a commune in the Ariège department in South-Western France.

== Population ==
Inhabitants of the area are called Orgibetois in French.

Historical population
Year	Pop.	±% p.a.
1968	263	—
1975	177	−5.50%
1982	164	−1.08%
1990	144	−1.61%
1999	164	+1.46%
2007	170	+0.45%
2012	157	−1.58%
2017	187	+3.56%
2023	162	−2.36%
Source: INSEE

== See also ==
- Communes of the Ariège department
