= Sentein =

Commune in Occitanie, France

- Commune
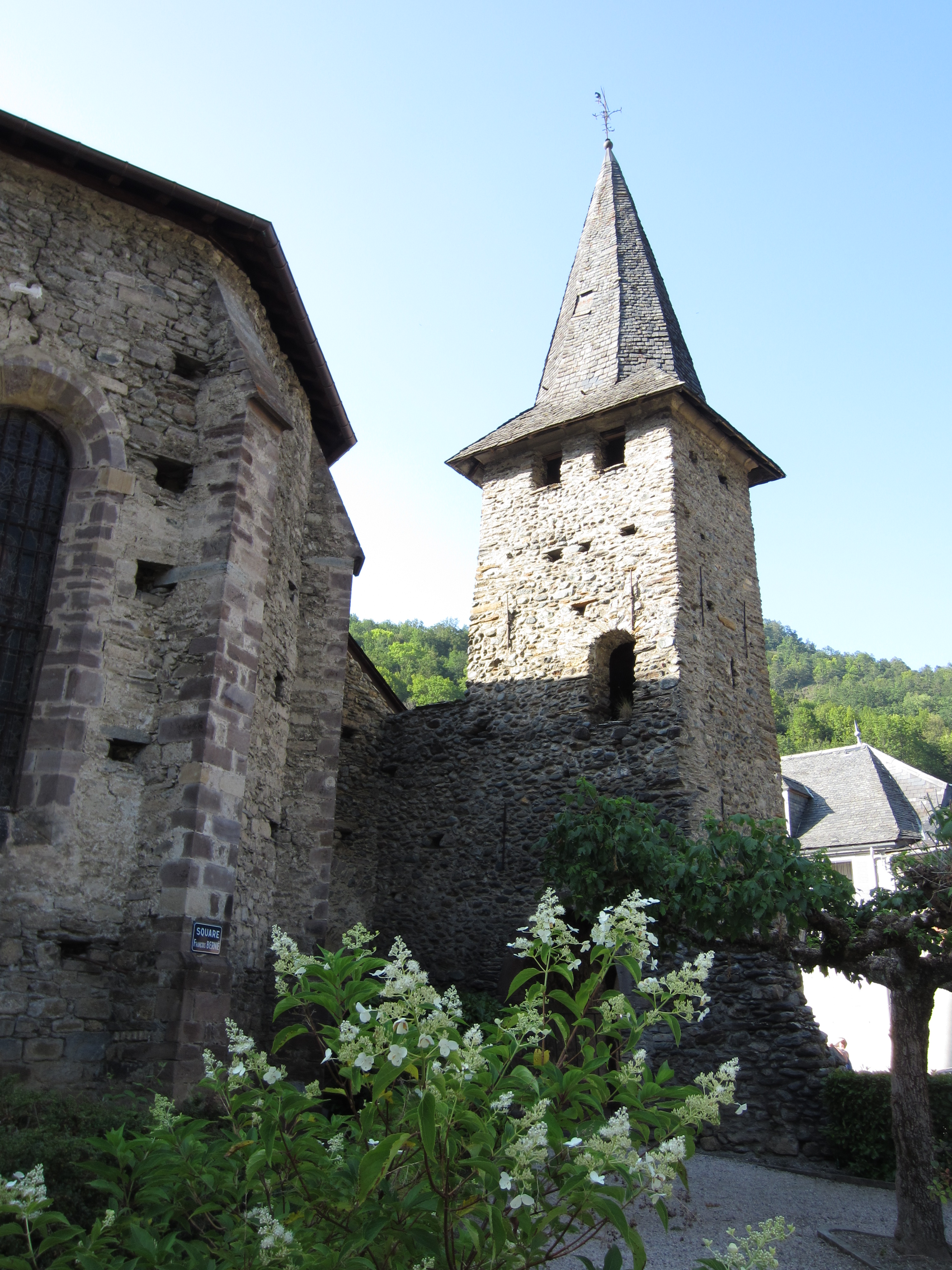
- The church in Sentein
- Location of Sentein
- Location within France Location within Occitanie
- Coordinates: 42°52′32″N 0°57′19″E
- Country: France
- Region: Occitania
- Department: Ariège
- Arrondissement: Saint-Girons
- Canton: Couserans Ouest

Government
  - Mayor (2020–2026): Marc-Henri Seube
- Area^{1}: 59.18 km^{2} (22.85 sq mi)
- Elevation: 731 m (2,398 ft)
- Highest elevation: 2,882 m (9,455 ft)
- Lowest elevation: 715 m (2,346 ft)
- Population (2023): 175
  - Density: 2.96/km^{2} (7.66/sq mi)
- Time zone: UTC+01:00 (CET)
  - Summer (DST): UTC+02:00 (CEST)
- INSEE/Postal code: 09290 /09800
- ^{1} French Land Register data, which excludes lakes, ponds, glaciers > 1 km^{2} (0.386 sq mi or 247 acres) and river estuaries.

Sentein (French pronunciation: [sɑ̃tɛ̃]; Occitan: Santenh) is a commune in the Ariège department in southwestern France.

== Population ==
Inhabitants of Sentein are called Sentenois in French.

Historical population
Year	Pop.	±% p.a.
1968	382	—
1975	296	−3.58%
1982	204	−5.18%
1990	154	−3.45%
1999	147	−0.52%
2007	144	−0.26%
2012	157	+1.74%
2017	150	−0.91%
2023	175	+2.60%
Source: INSEE

== See also ==
- Communes of the Ariège department
