= Aleu =

Commune in Occitanie, France

- Commune
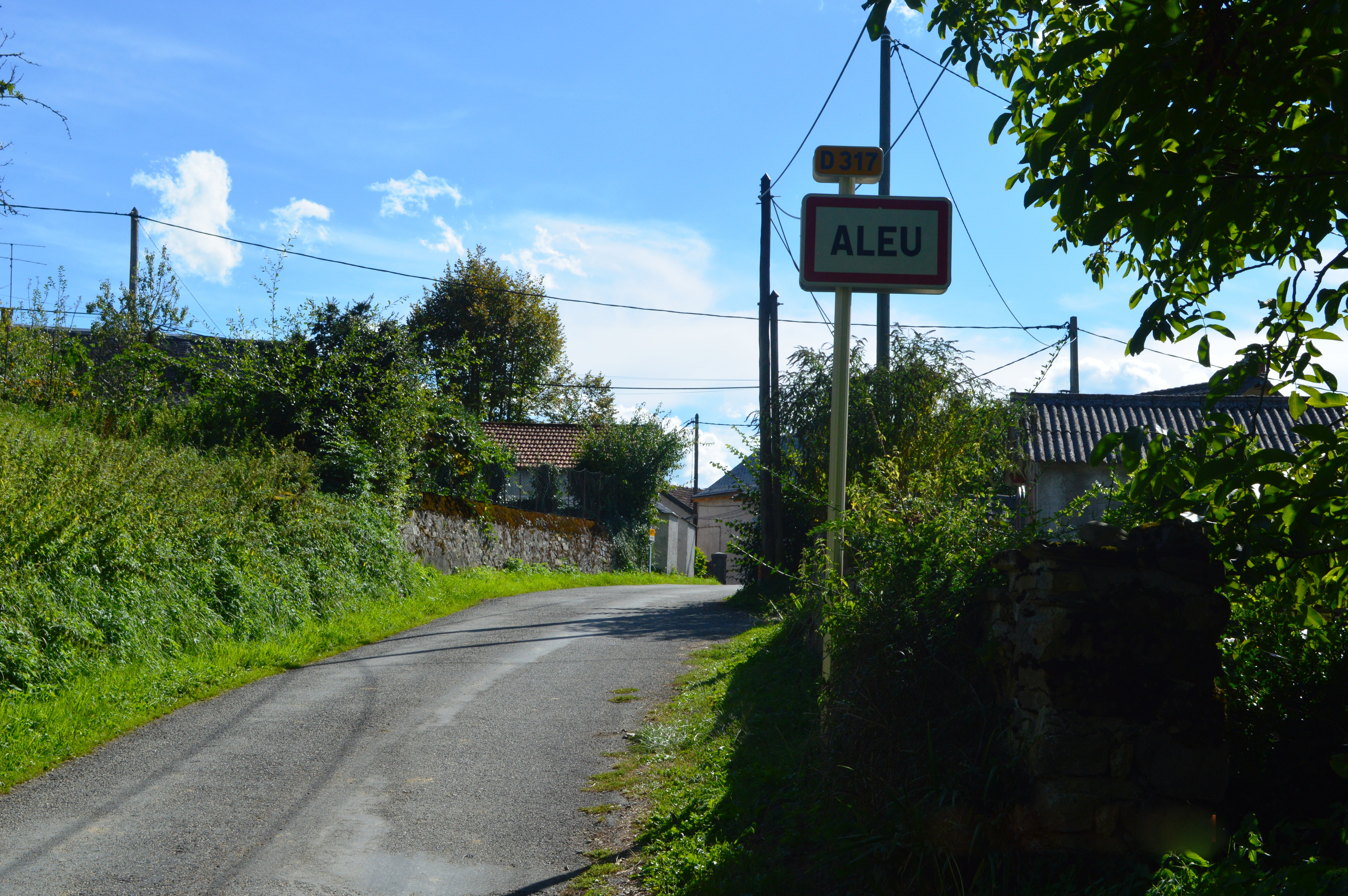
- The road into Aleu
- Location of Aleu
- Location within France Location within Occitanie
- Coordinates: 42°53′37″N 1°16′01″E
- Country: France
- Region: Occitania
- Department: Ariège
- Arrondissement: Saint-Girons
- Canton: Couserans Est
- Intercommunality: Couserans-Pyrénées

Government
  - Mayor (2020–2026): André Vidal
- Area^{1}: 13.95 km^{2} (5.39 sq mi)
- Elevation: 700 m (2,300 ft)
- Highest elevation: 1,105 m (3,625 ft)
- Lowest elevation: 496 m (1,627 ft)
- Population (2023): 137
  - Density: 9.82/km^{2} (25.4/sq mi)
- Time zone: UTC+01:00 (CET)
  - Summer (DST): UTC+02:00 (CEST)
- INSEE/Postal code: 09005 /09320
- ^{1} French Land Register data, which excludes lakes, ponds, glaciers > 1 km^{2} (0.386 sq mi or 247 acres) and river estuaries.

Aleu (French pronunciation: [alø]; Occitan: Àleu) is a commune in the Ariège department in the Occitanie region of southwestern France.

== Geography ==
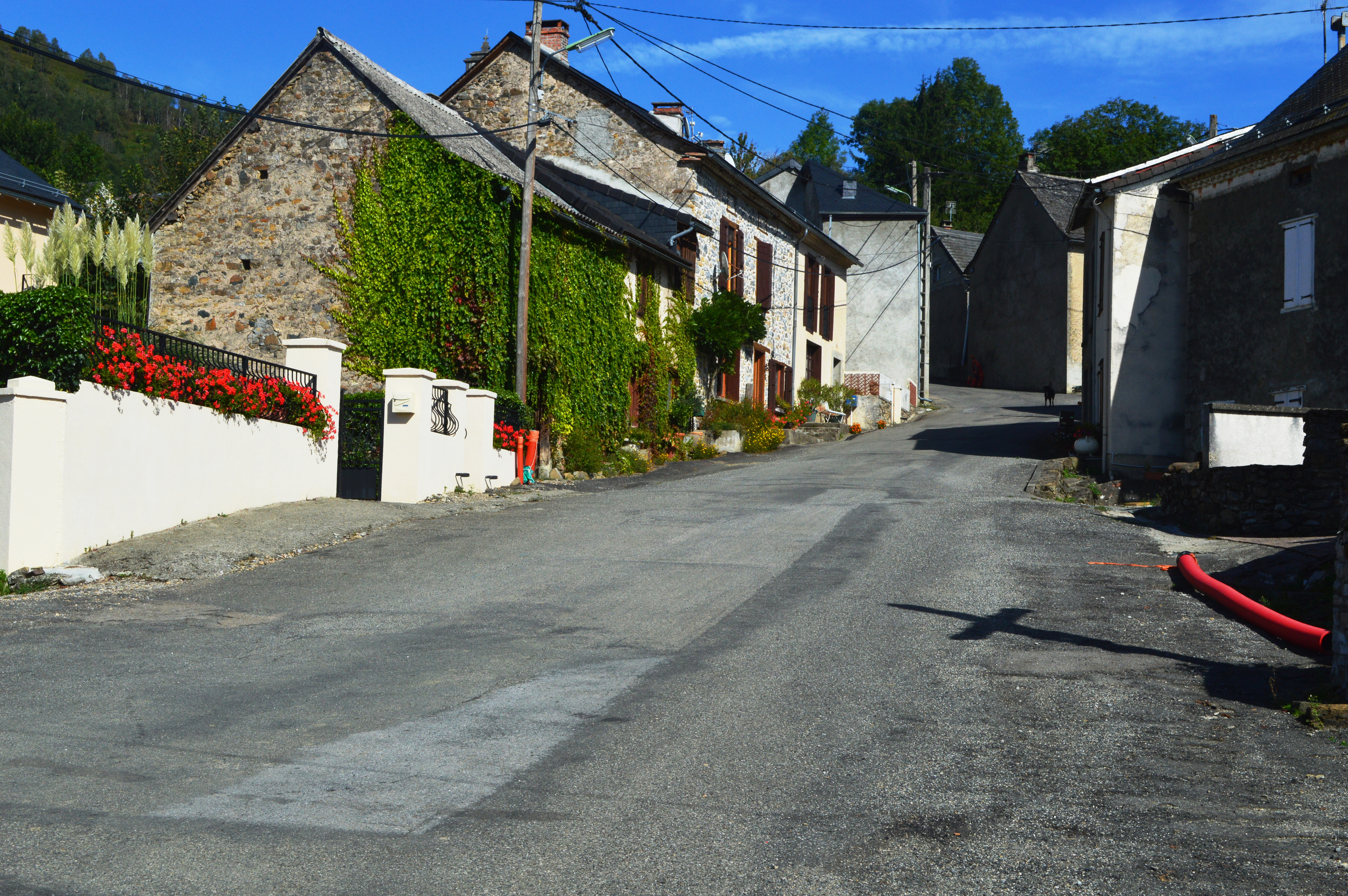
A street in Aleu

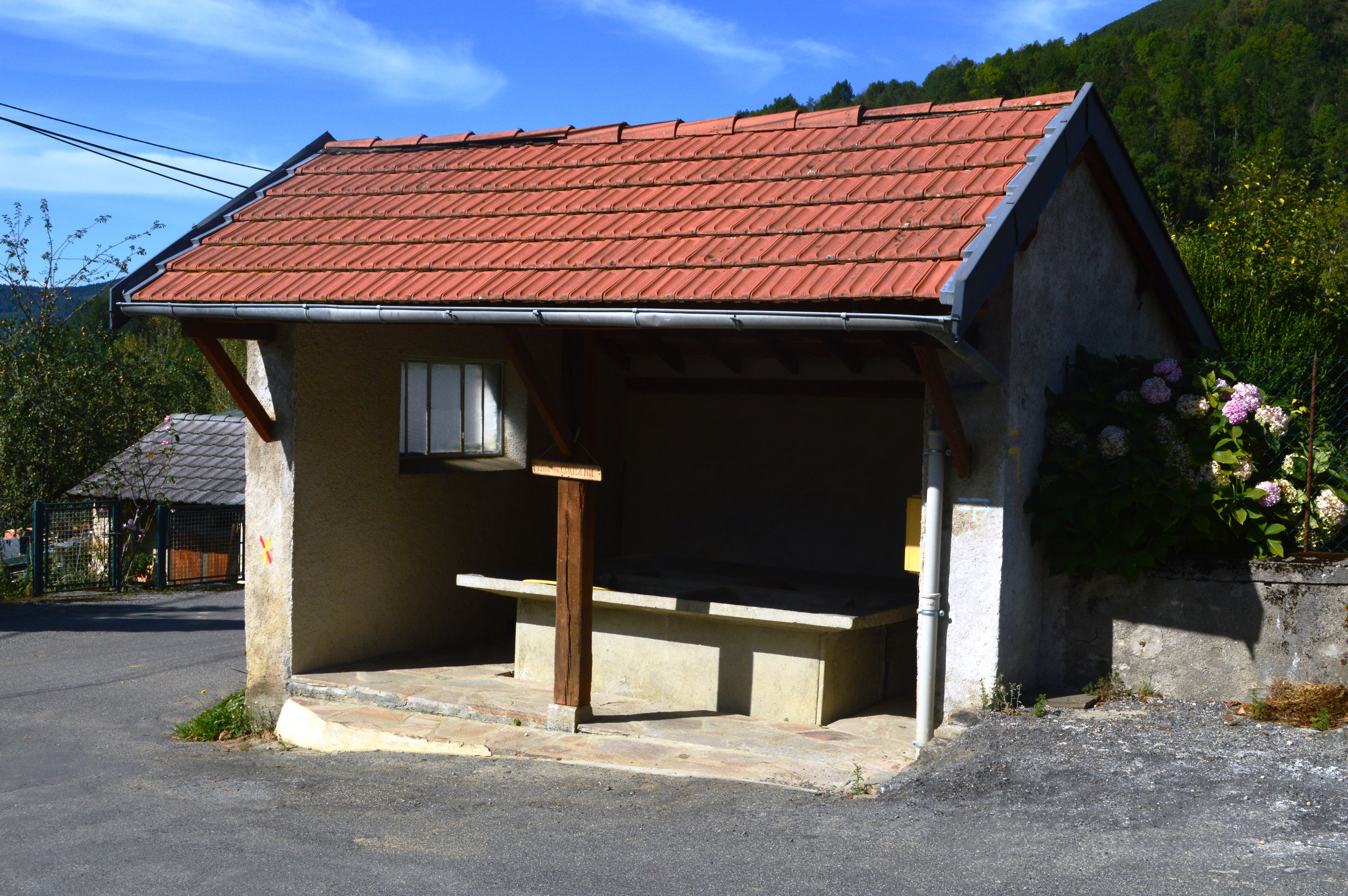
Lavoir (public laundry)

Aleu is located some 10 km south-east of Saint-Girons and 30 km west by south-west of Foix. It can be accessed by the D618 road coming from the west and following the northern border of the commune continuing to Biert in the east. The only access to the village by vehicle is by a small mountain road branching from the D618 at Castet d'Aleu. There is a small unsealed airstrip north-east of the village at approx 1000m altitude. The commune is very rugged with extensive forests. Apart from the village, there are numerous hamlets: Castet d'Aleu, Galas d'en Bas and Galas d'en Haut, La Trappe, La Bordasse, Biech, Pinsou, La Rouere and Fontale.

The Ruisseau d'Aleu rises in the south of the commune and flows north through the centre of the commune and the village gathering many tributaries and continues to join the Arac which forms the entire northern border of the commune. The Ruisseau de Loule forms most of the eastern border and also flows into the Arac. In the west the Ruisseau de Regude forms most of the border and flows north-west to join the Arac north-west of the commune.

== History ==
The commune of Aleu was created in the French Revolution superseding the Community of Aleu which was detached in 1776 from that of Soulan.

== Administration ==
List of successive mayors

From	To	Name
2001	2008	Louis Gilabert
2008	2026	André Vidal

== Population ==
The inhabitants of the commune are known as Aleudiens or Aleudiennes in French.

Historical population
Year	Pop.	±% p.a.
1968	211	—
1975	135	−6.18%
1982	127	−0.87%
1990	134	+0.67%
1999	122	−1.04%
2007	143	+2.01%
2012	134	−1.29%
2017	130	−0.60%
2023	137	+0.88%
Source: INSEE

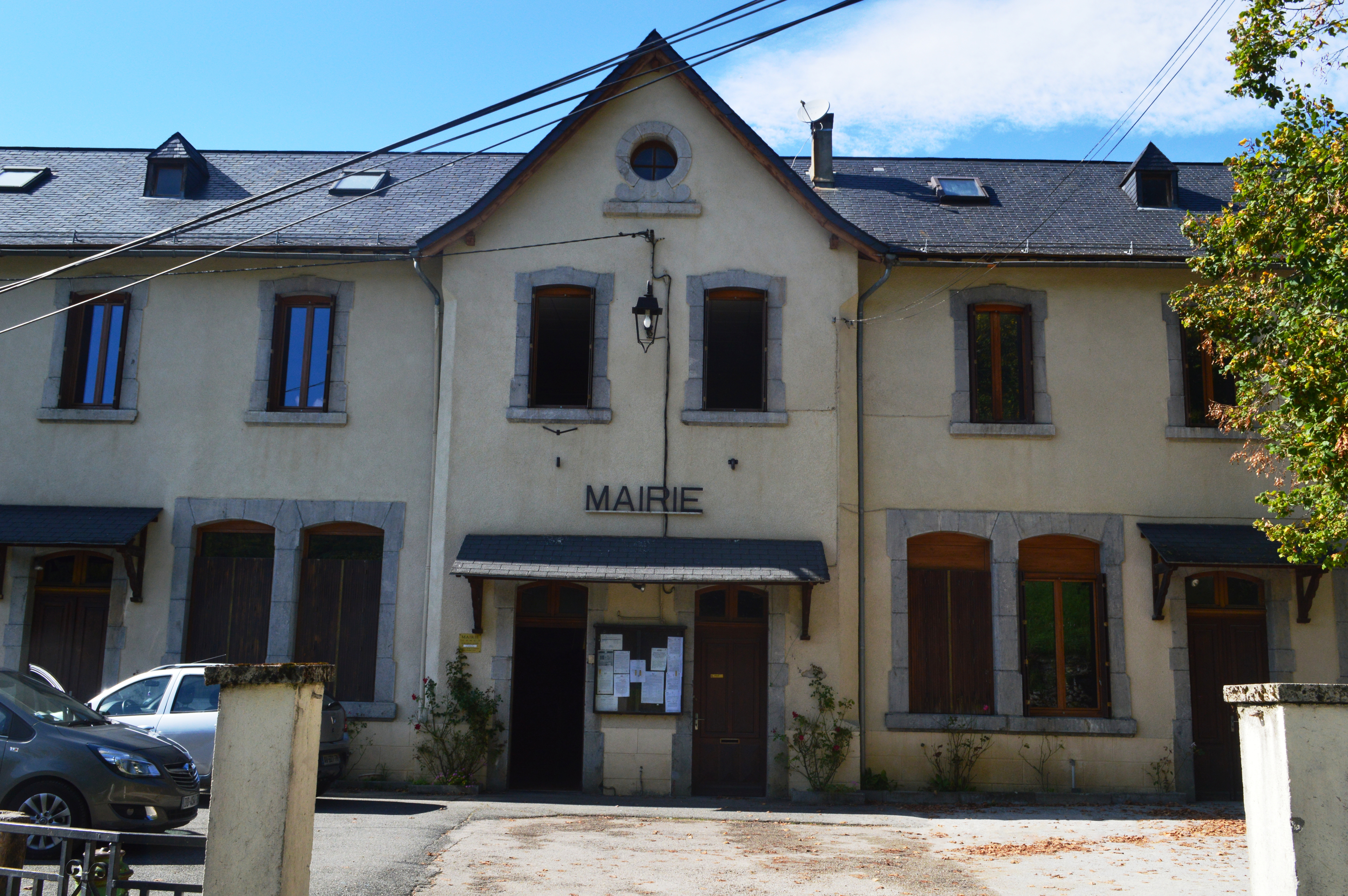
Aleu Town Hall

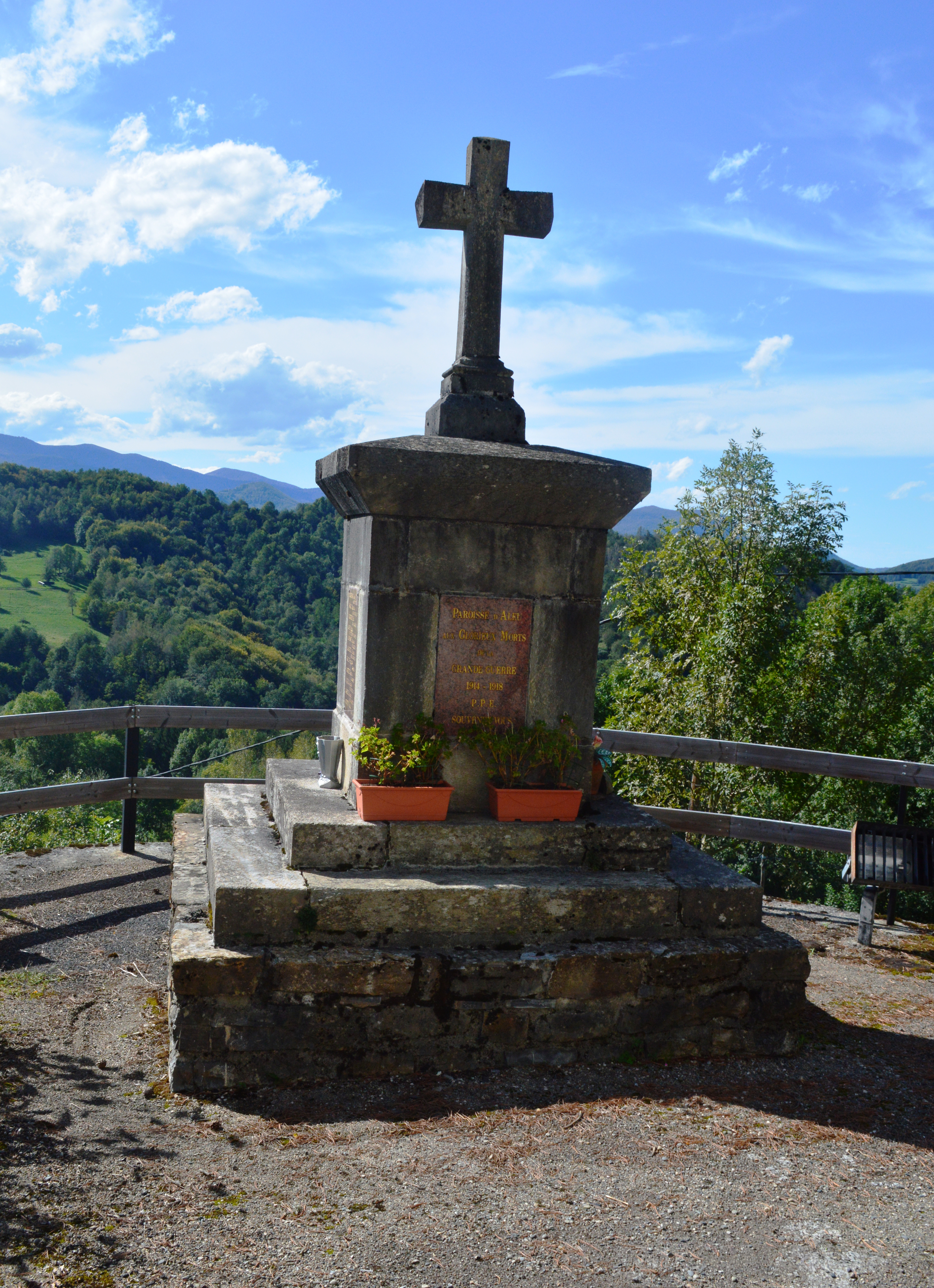
War memorial

== Sites and monuments ==
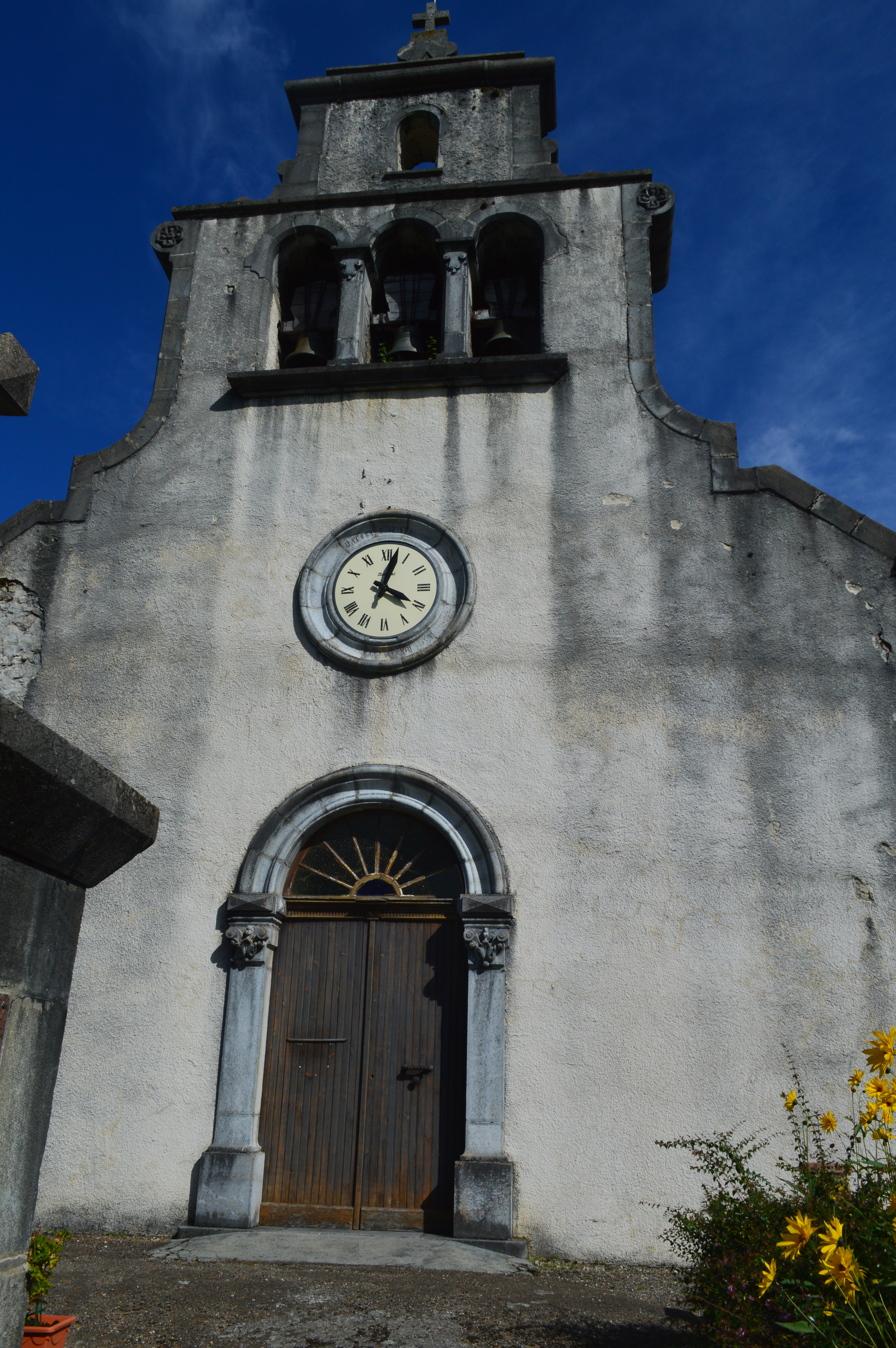
The Church of Saint Benedict

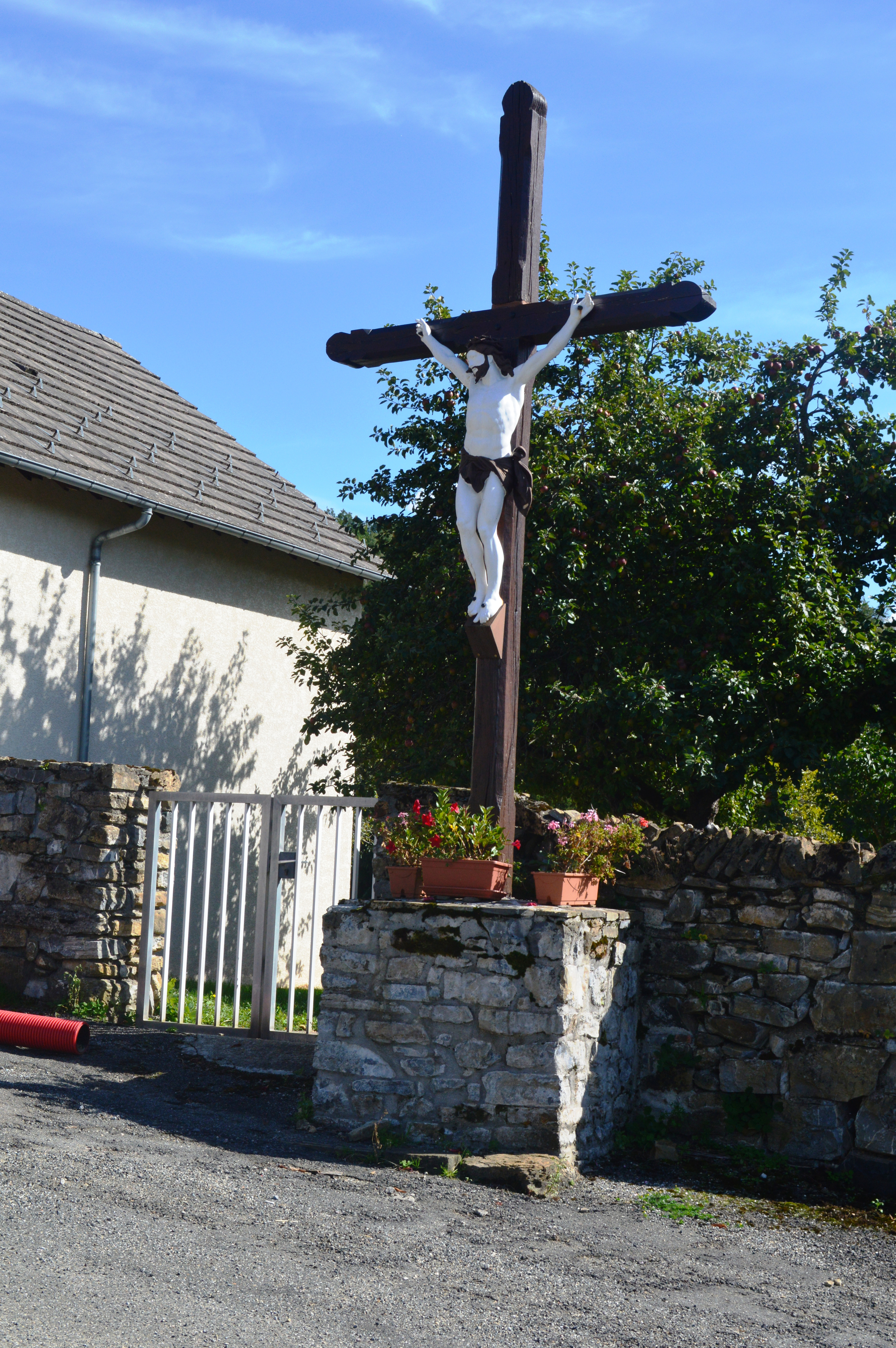
A monumental cross in Aleu

- Joubac, a small peak just above Aleu, has an altiport with a view of all the surrounding mountains and the Mont Valier mountain chain
- The Church of Saint Benedict contains a 12th-century font which is registered as an historical object.
- Church of Saint Roch and Saint Germaine at Castet d'Aleu (windows from the 19th century)
- Castelet of Castet at Aleu dating from the 12th or 13th century

== Notable people linked to the commune ==
- Léopold Galy, born in Aleu on 12 March 1908 and died at Toulouse on 17 February 2001, was a French aviator and test pilot

== See also ==
- Communes of the Ariège department
- Cantons of the Ariège department
- Arrondissements of the Ariège department
