= Étang d'Araing =

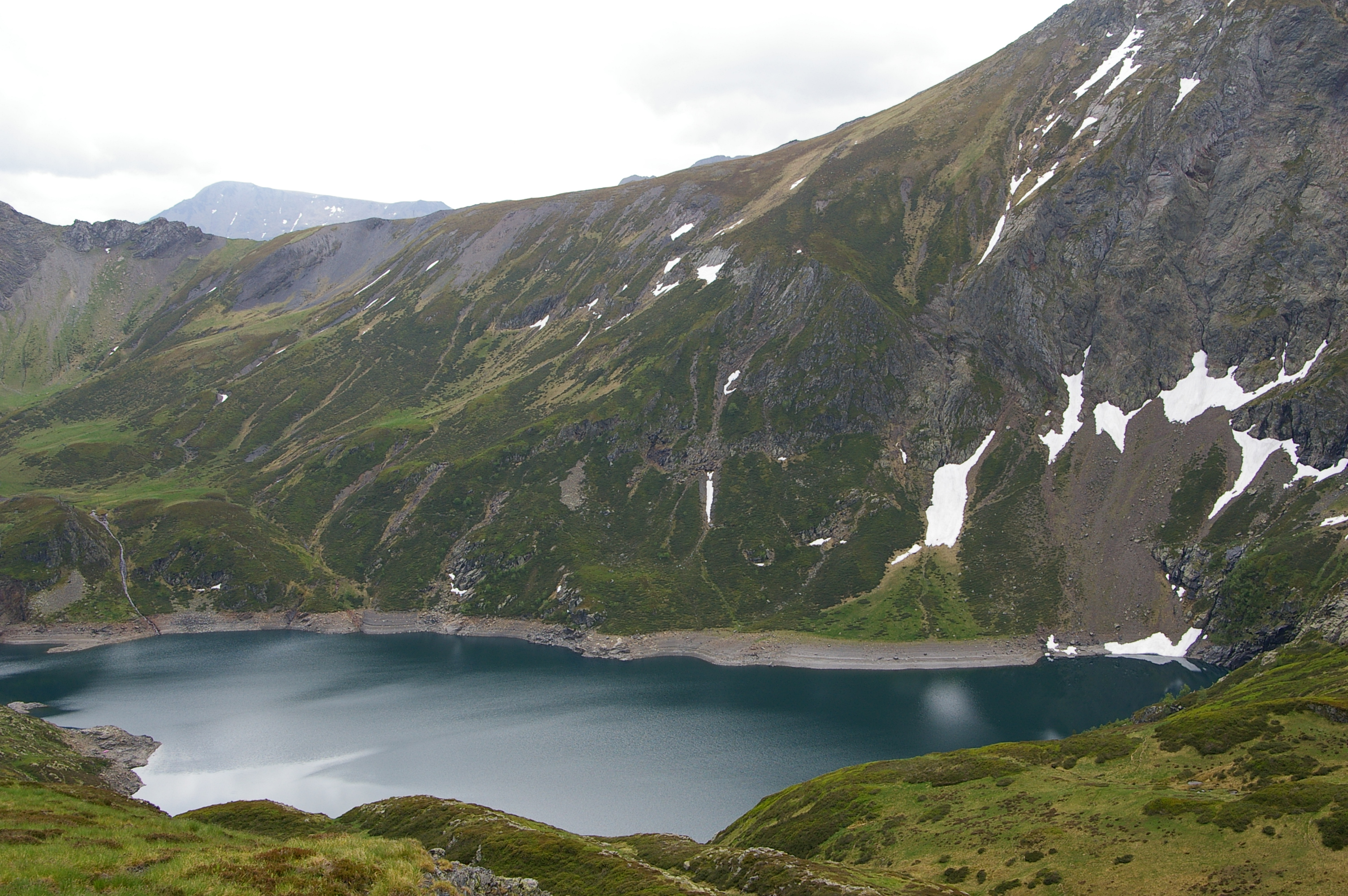

- Location within France
- Location: Couserans, Ariège
- Coordinates: 42°49′53″N 00°52′23″E
- Type: reservoir
- Basin countries: France
- Surface area: 0.33 km^{2} (0.13 sq mi)
- Max. depth: 25 m (82 ft)
- Water volume: 9,500,000 m^{3} (340,000,000 cu ft)
- Surface elevation: 1,909 m (6,263 ft)

Étang d'Araing is a lake in Couserans, Ariège department, France. At an elevation of 1,909 m, its surface area is 0.33 km^{2}.
