= Dent d'Orlu =

- Pic de Brasseil
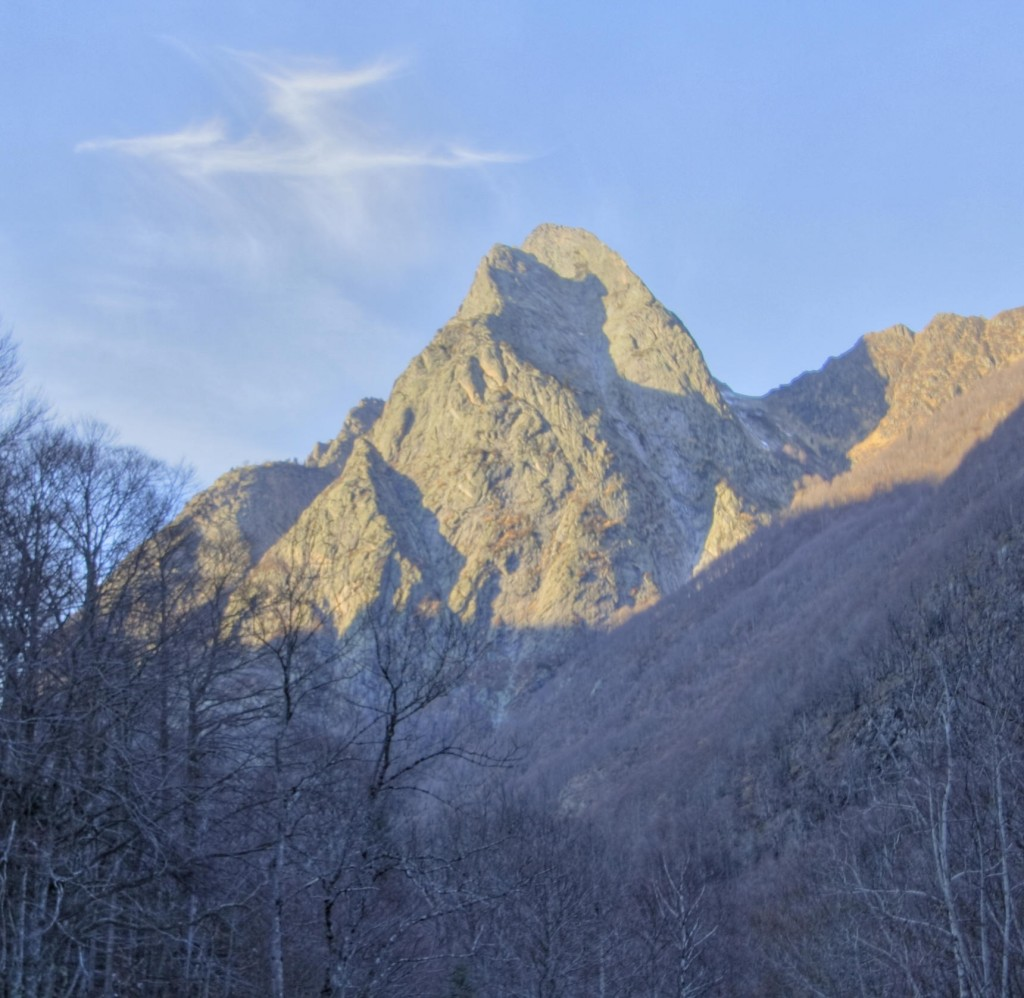

Highest point
- Elevation: 2,222 m (7,290 ft)
- Prominence: 261 m (856 ft)
- Coordinates: 42°41′33″N 1°56′23″E

Geography
- Location within France
- Location: Ariège, France
- Parent range: Pyrenees

Climbing
- Easiest route: From the north (from the Ascou valley) in 2 hours

The Dent d'Orlu, also known as the Pic de Brasseil (el. 2222 m) is a distinctive peak in the Pyrenees in the commune of Orlu in the Ariège department in southwestern France.
