= Mont Valier =

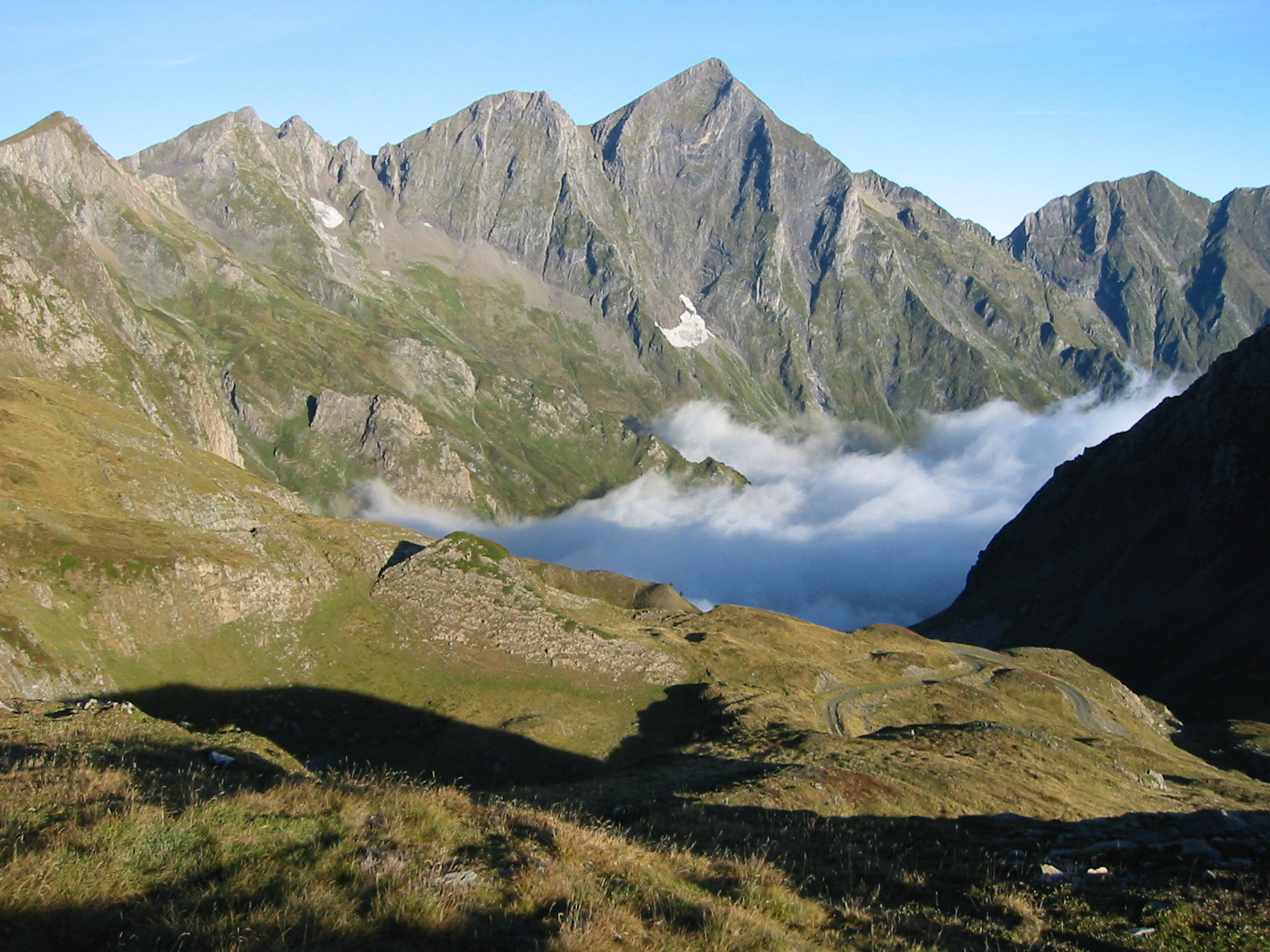
- Mont Valier seen from the Port d'Aula

Highest point
- Elevation: 2,838 m (9,311 ft)
- Prominence: 508 m (1,667 ft)
- Coordinates: 42°47′52″N 01°05′08″E

Geography
- Location within Pyrenees
- Location: Ariège, France
- Parent range: Pyrenees

Climbing
- Easiest route: By the Ribérot valley and the refuge des Estagnous

Mont Valier (Languedocien: Mont Valièr) (2,838 metres (9,311 ft)) is a mountain of the Pyrenees in Ariège, France.

Its name comes from Valerius (Saint Valier, ca. 452), the mythical first bishop of Couserans, who climbed the peak. Bernard de Marmiesse, another bishop of Couserans, had a marble cross erected on the peak in 1670.

== Geography ==
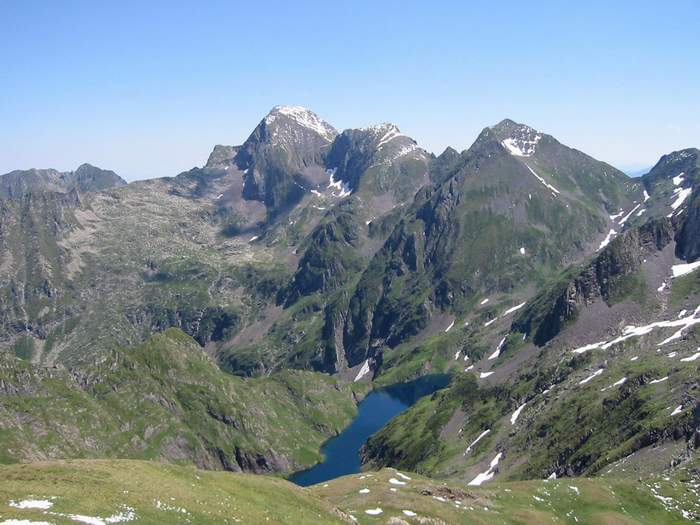
Mont Valier, the refuge des Estagnous and the Etang Long seen from the Port de Barlonguère

A small glacier, the Glacier d'Arcouzan, occupies its northeastern slope. It is the only glacier in the Pyrenees situated below 3000m, the most Eastern glacier in the chain and also the most isolated. The summit is located on the perimeter of the regional park of the Ariège Pyrenees. A number of valleys originate on its sides:
On the French side, the stream of Artigues, a tributary of the Salat (which itself rises a few miles from Mont Valier) and the Ribérot, a tributary of the Lez, itself a tributary of the Salat.
On the Spanish side, the Noguera Pallaresa, and a few miles to the west, a tributary of the river Ebro.

== Climbing ==
The normal route, in summer, starts from the Refuge des Estagnous and travels to the Col Faustin before ascending the broad South face. This is the easiest route, although it is still challenging. The other principal route to the summit is via the Arête des Antiques and involves rock climbing along an exposed ridge. The east face and its famous "Trou Noir", (black hole), first climbed by Louis Audoubert in 1971, is rarely ascended. The classic ascent in winter is via the Couloir Faustin; it is a long outing mostly on snow (AD).

== History ==
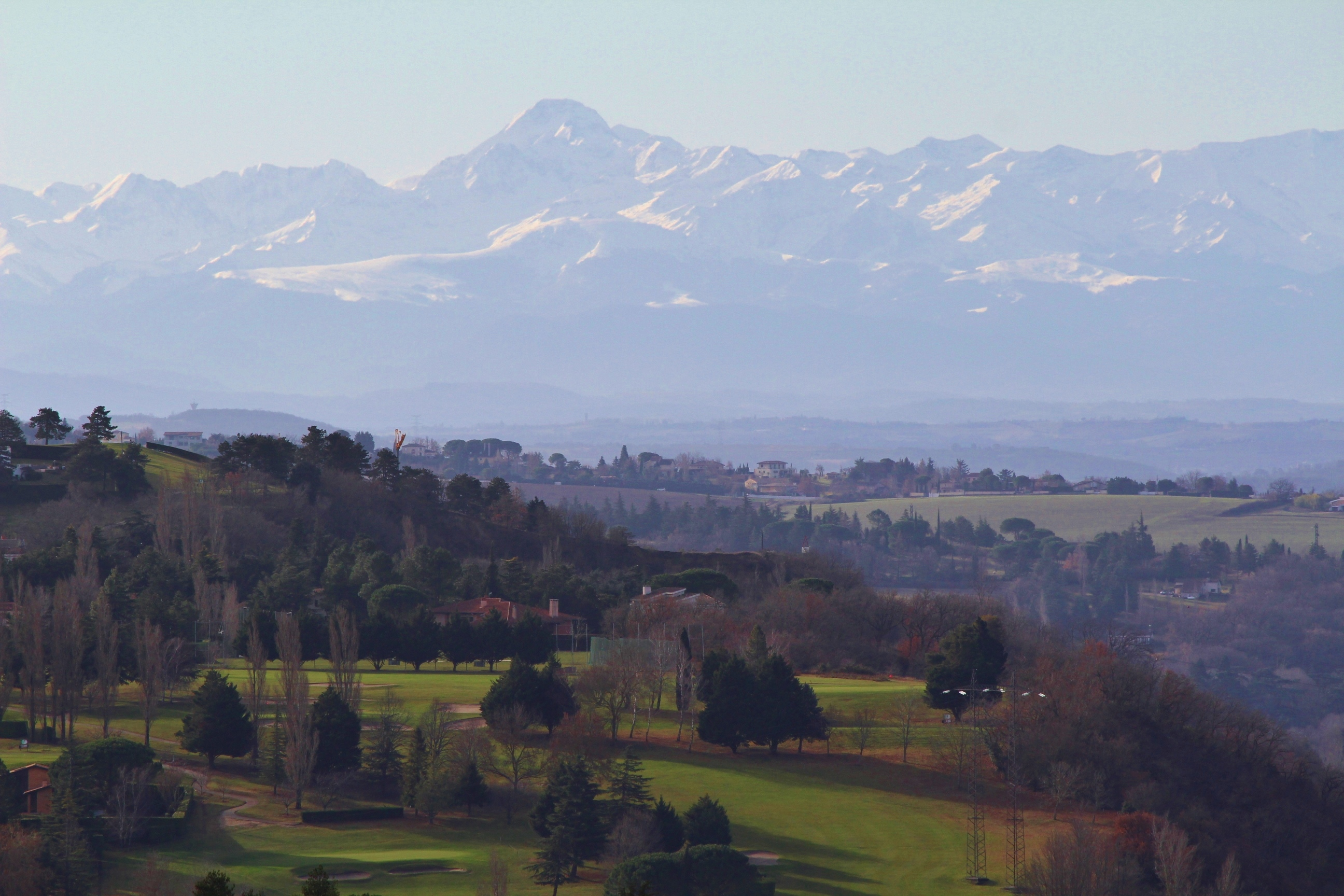
Mont Valier seen from Toulouse

During World War II, an escape route from Saint-Girons to Esterri d'Àneu in Catalonia crossed Mont Valier. The "Path to Freedom" – the name given in 1994 to the hiking trail that follows the course – enabled the evacuation of 782 people between 1940 and 1944 and remained operational despite increased surveillance by the Germans from 1943. The route was operational until the end of the war.

On August 18, 2023, French general Jean-Louis Georgelin fell to his death while hiking on Mont Valier, at an altitude of 2,650 metres (8,690 ft).

== Protected zone ==
By a ministerial decree of 5 July 2005, a large area centred on the village of Seix, including the Crown Reserve of Mont Valier, was designated as a "special protection area" and a site of the Natura 2000 network.
