= Château de Foix =

Castle in Ariège, Occitania, France

Coordinates: 42°57′56″N 1°36′18″E

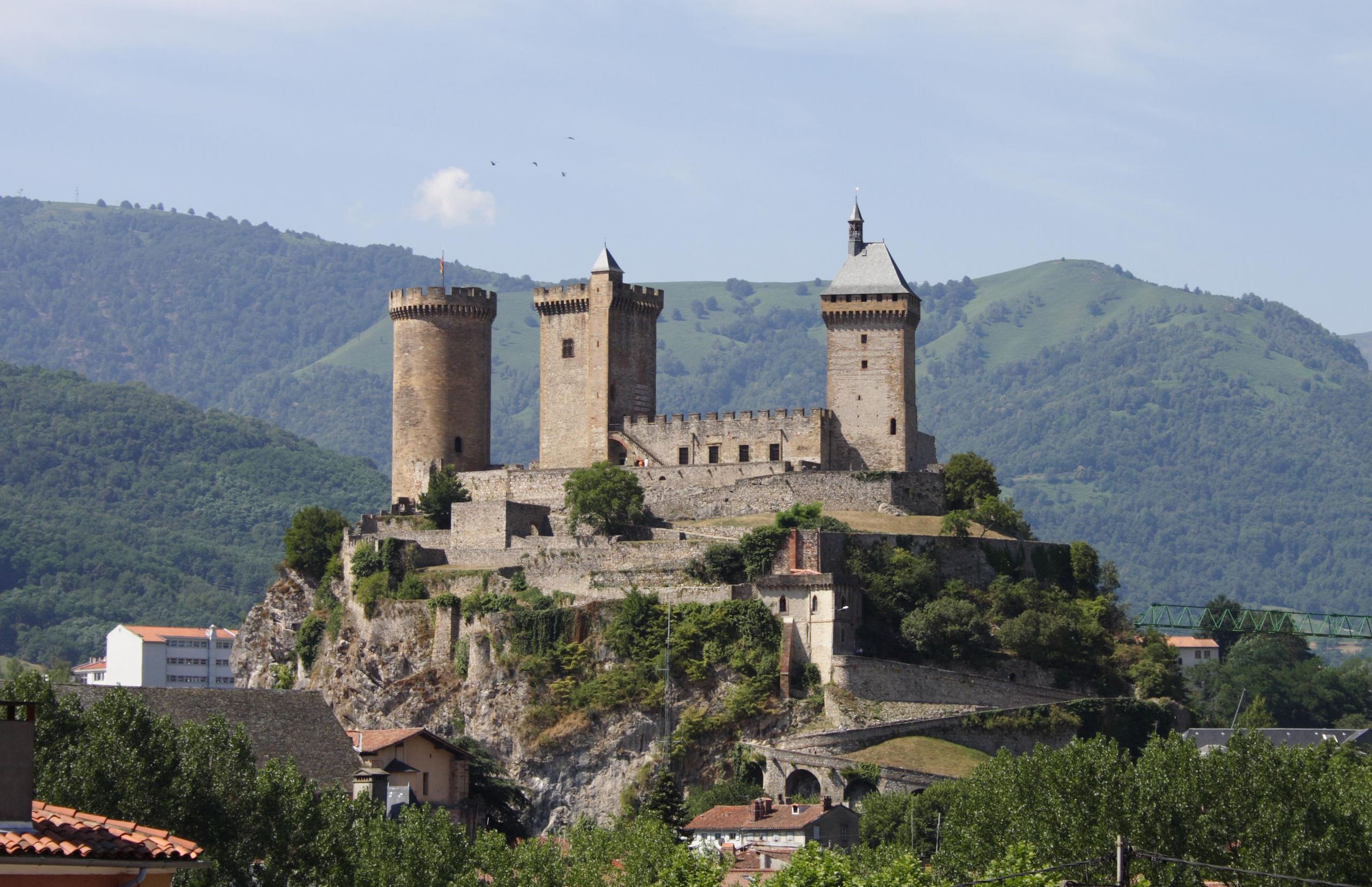
Château de Foix

The Château de Foix (Languedocien: Castèl de Fois) is a castle which dominates the town of Foix in the French département of Ariège. An important tourist site, it is known as a centre of the Cathars. It has been listed since 1840 as a monument historique by the French Ministry of Culture.

== History ==
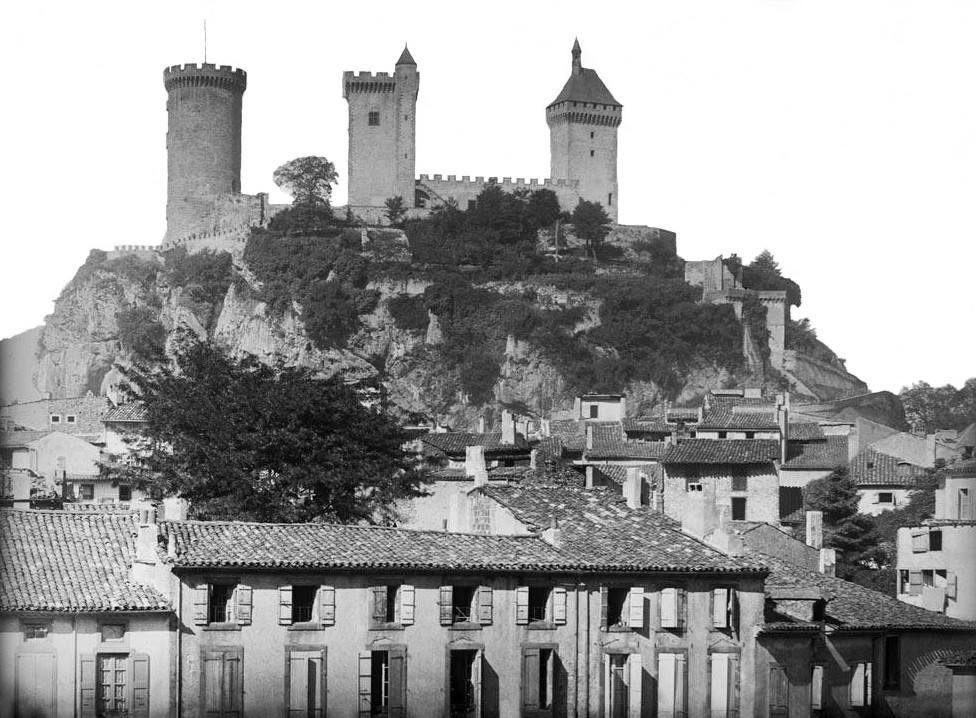
The Château de Foix, as shown in a photograph from the late 19th century

Built on an older 7th-century fortification, the castle is known from 987. In 1002, it was mentioned in the will of Roger I, Count of Carcassonne, who bequeathed the fortress to his youngest child, Bernard. In effect, the family ruling over the region were installed here which allowed them to control access to the upper Ariège valley and to keep surveillance from this strategic point over the lower land, protected behind impregnable walls.

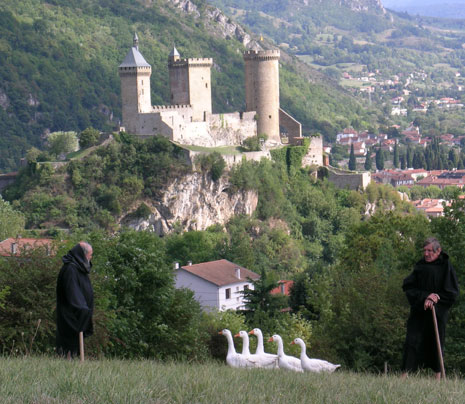
Château de Foix

In 1034, the castle became capital of the County of Foix and played a decisive role in medieval military history. During the two following centuries, the castle was home to Counts with shining personalities who became the soul of the Occitan resistance during the crusade against the Albigensians. The county became a privileged refuge for persecuted Cathars.

The castle, often besieged (notably by Simon de Montfort in 1211 and 1212), resisted assault and was only taken once, in 1486, thanks to treachery during the war between two branches of the Foix family.

From the 14th century, the Counts of Foix spent less and less time in the uncomfortable castle, preferring the Governors' Palace (Palais des gouverneurs). From 1479, the Counts of Foix became Kings of Navarre and the last of them, made Henri IV of France, annexed his Pyrrenean lands to France.

As seat of the Governor of the Foix region from the 15th century, the castle continued to ensure the defence of the area, notably during the Wars of Religion. Alone of all the castles in the region, it was exempted from the destruction orders of Cardinal Richelieu (1632–1638).

Until the Revolution, the fortress remained a garrison. Its life was brightened with grand receptions for its governors, including the Count of Tréville, captain of musketeers under Louis XIII and Marshal Philippe Henri de Ségur, one of Louis XVI's ministers. The Round Tower, built in the 15th century, is the most recent, the two square towers having been built before the 11th century. They served as a political and civil prison for four centuries until 1862.

Since 1930, the castle has housed the collections of the Ariège départemental museum. Sections on prehistory, Gallo-Roman and mediaeval archaeology tell the history of Ariège from ancient times. Currently, the museum is rearranging exhibits to concentrate on the history of the castle site so as to recreate the life of Foix at the time of the Counts.

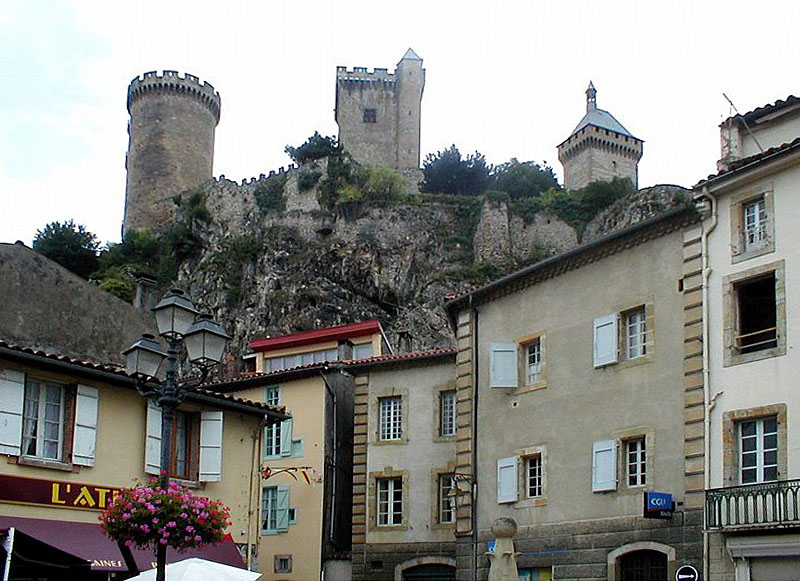
Château de Foix seen from the town

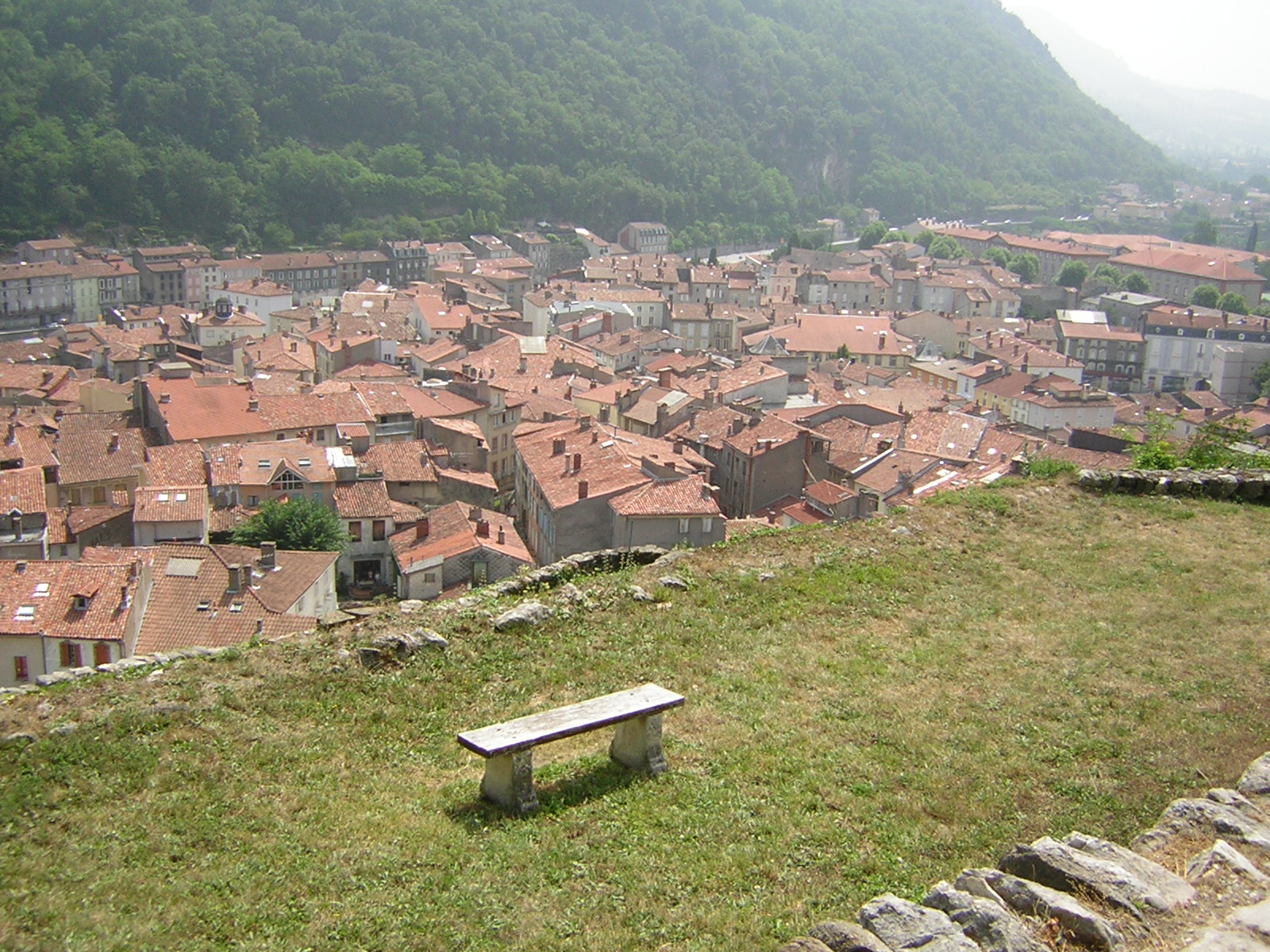
View of the town from Château de Foix

== See also ==
- List of counts of Foix
- List of castles in France
