= Orlu, Ariège =

Commune in Occitanie, France

Orlu
- Commune
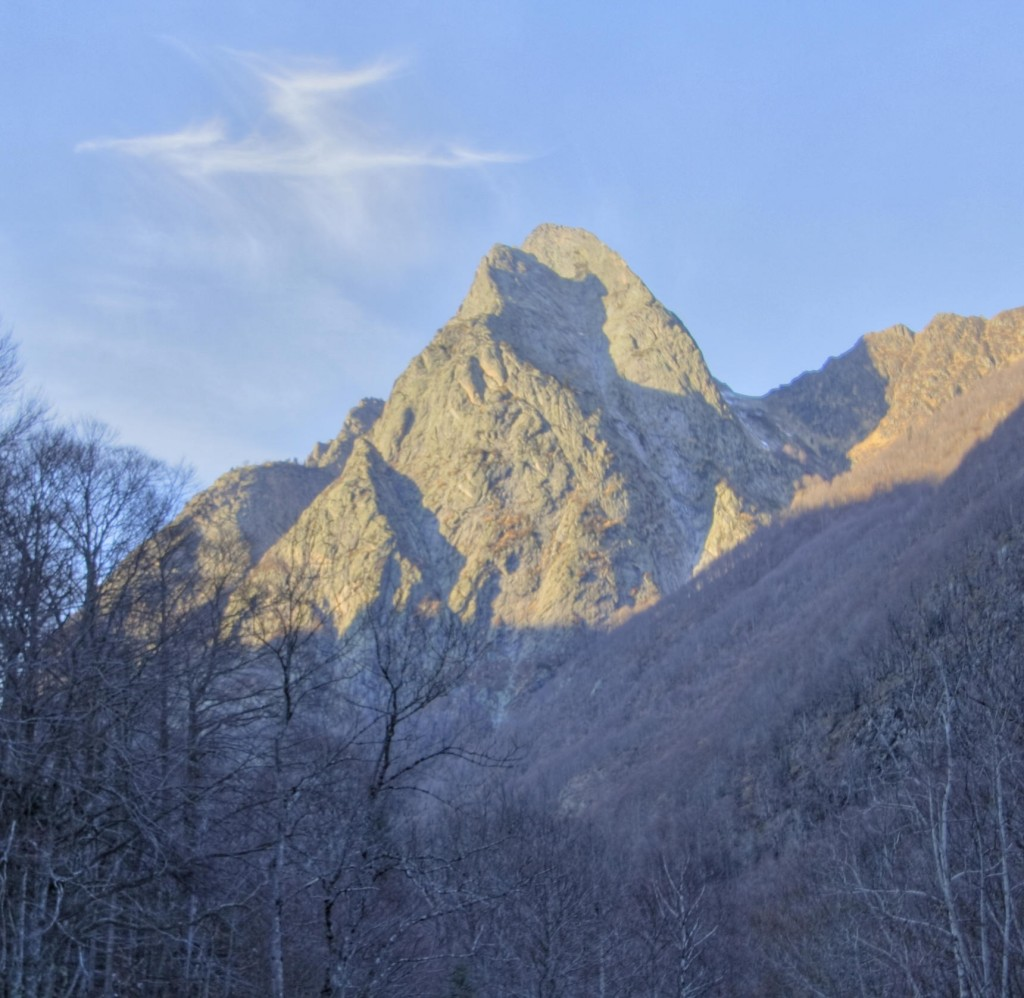
- Dent d'Orlu
- Location of Orlu
- Location within France Location within Occitanie
- Coordinates: 42°42′11″N 1°53′21″E
- Country: France
- Region: Occitania
- Department: Ariège
- Arrondissement: Foix
- Canton: Haute-Ariège

Government
  - Mayor (2020–2026): Alain Naudy
- Area^{1}: 70.79 km^{2} (27.33 sq mi)
- Elevation: 875 m (2,871 ft)
- Highest elevation: 2,773 m (9,098 ft)
- Lowest elevation: 830 m (2,720 ft)
- Population (2023): 157
  - Density: 2.22/km^{2} (5.74/sq mi)
- Time zone: UTC+01:00 (CET)
  - Summer (DST): UTC+02:00 (CEST)
- INSEE/Postal code: 09220 /09110
- ^{1} French Land Register data, which excludes lakes, ponds, glaciers > 1 km^{2} (0.386 sq mi or 247 acres) and river estuaries.

Orlu (French pronunciation: [ɔʁly]; Languedocien: Orlun) is a commune in the Ariège department in southwestern France.

== Population ==
Inhabitants of Orlu are called Orlunais in French.

Historical population
Year	Pop.	±% p.a.
1968	125	—
1975	133	+0.89%
1982	147	+1.44%
1990	179	+2.49%
1999	195	+0.96%
2007	197	+0.13%
2012	188	−0.93%
2017	160	−3.17%
2023	157	−0.31%
Source: INSEE

== See also ==
- Communes of the Ariège department
