= Ariège (department) =

Department in Occitania, France

Ariège Arièja (Occitan)
- Department
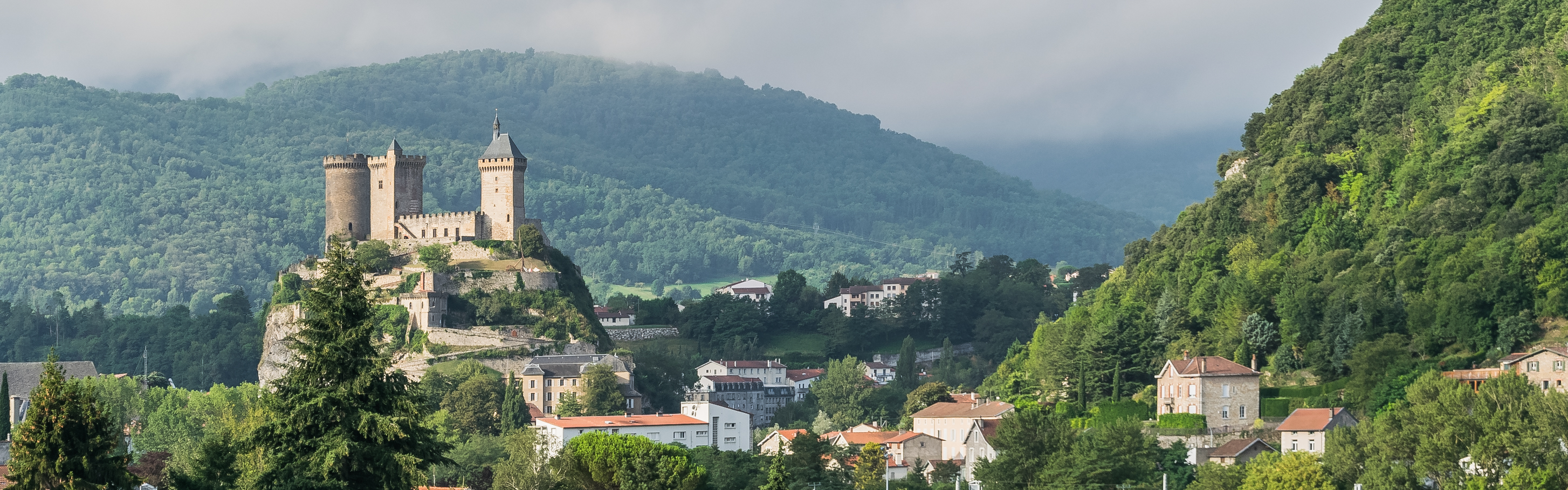
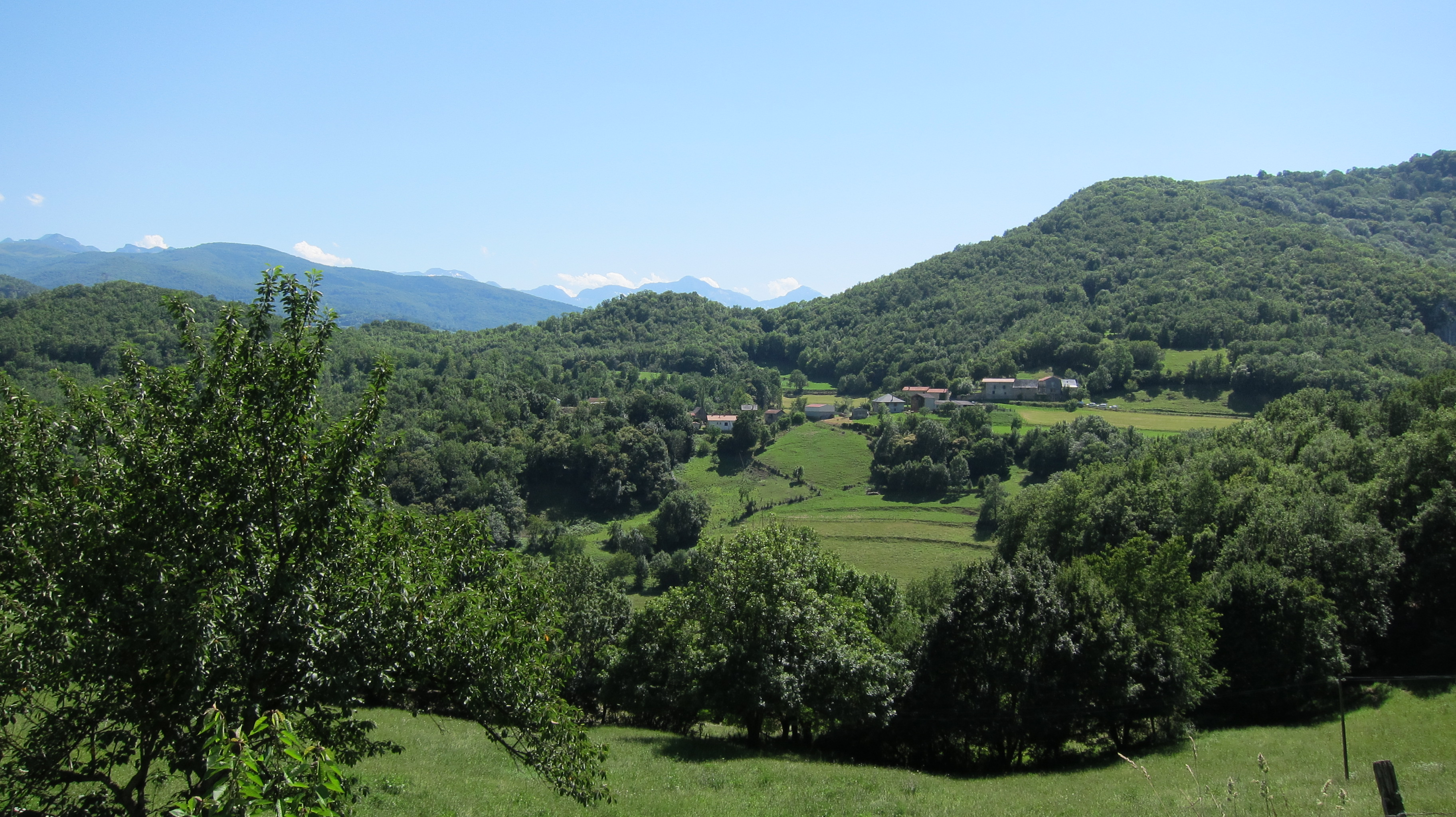
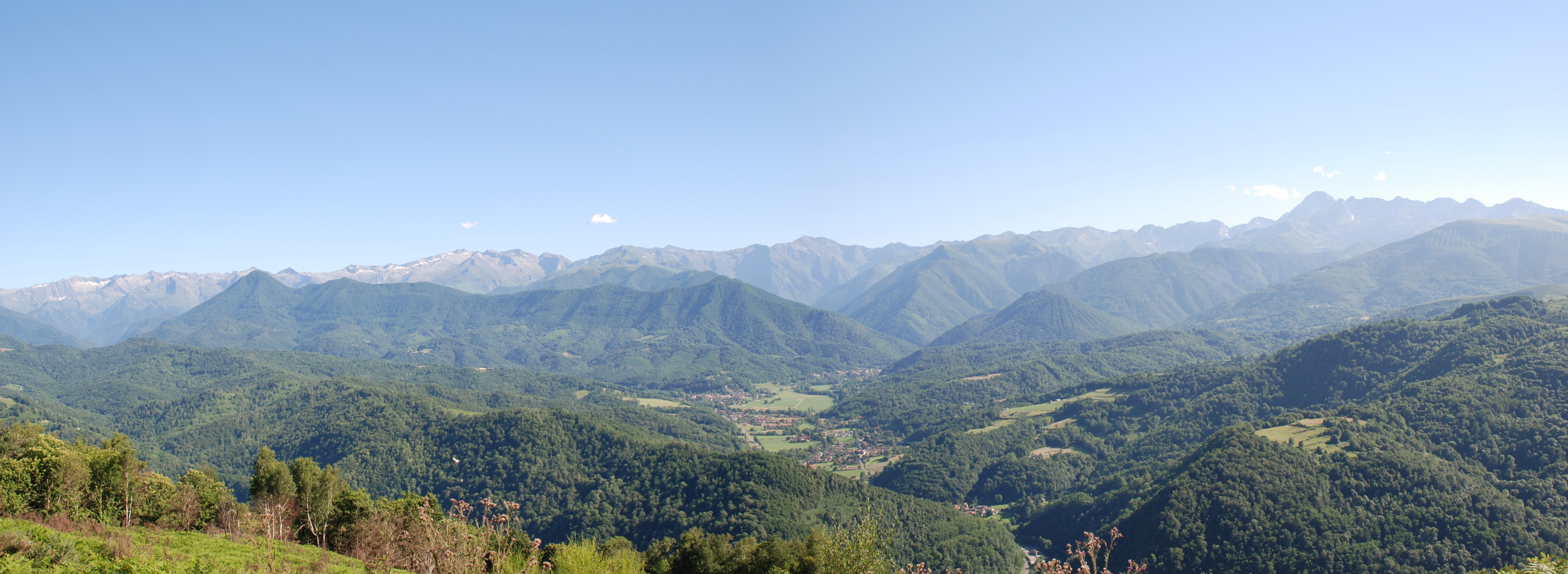
- From top down: view of Foix (prefecture) and its castle, Montégut-en-Couserans, Erp

- Flag Coat of arms

- Location of Ariège in France
- Coordinates: 43°00′N 1°30′E
- Country: France
- Region: Occitanie
- Prefecture: Foix
- Subprefectures: Pamiers, Saint-Girons

Government
  - President of the Departmental Council: Christine Tequi

Area
  - Total: 4,890 km^{2} (1,890 sq mi)

Population (2023)
  - Total: 155,722
  - Rank: 97th
  - Density: 31.8/km^{2} (82.5/sq mi)
- Demonyms: Ariègeois, Ariègeoise
- Time zone: UTC+1 (CET)
  - Summer (DST): UTC+2 (CEST)
- ISO 3166 code: FR-09
- Department number: 09
- Largest city: Pamiers
- Arrondissements: 3
- Cantons: 13
- Communes: 325
- Website: www.ariege.fr
- ^1 French Land Register data, which exclude estuaries, and lakes, ponds, and glaciers larger than 1 km^{2}

Ariège (French pronunciation: [aʁjɛʒ]; Occitan: Arièja [aɾiˈɛdʒɔ]) is a department in southwestern France, located in the region of Occitanie. It is named after the river Ariège and its capital is Foix. Ariège is known for its rural and mountainous landscape, with a population of 155,722 as of 2023. Its INSEE and postal code is 09. The inhabitants of the department are known as Ariègeois or Ariègeoises.

== Geography ==
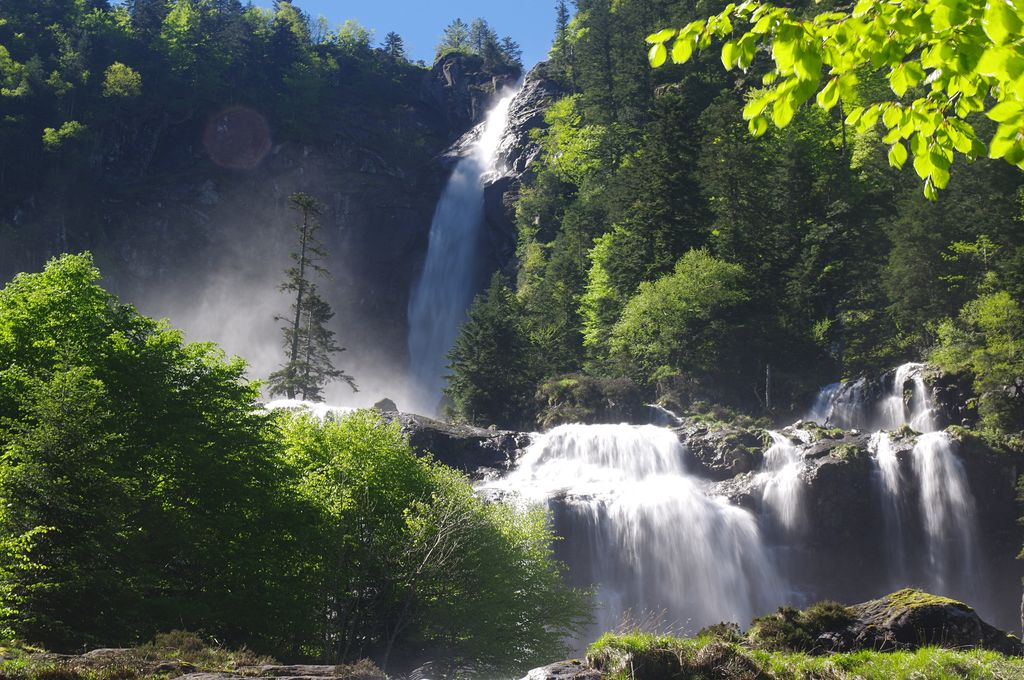
The Cascade d'Ars in Aulus-les-Bains in the Pyrenees, Ariège

The department is part of the Occitanie region. It borders Haute-Garonne to the west and north, Aude to the east, Pyrénées-Orientales to the south-east. To the south it borders Andorra and the Spanish Province of Lleida. Covering an area of 4,890 km^{2}, the department is divided into three arrondissements: Foix, Pamiers, and Saint-Girons. It comprises 13 cantons, 21 intercommunalities, and 325 communes. In 2009 the Regional Natural Park of the Ariège Pyrenees was created covering about 40% of the area of the department of Ariège.

=== Natural regions ===
There are three main areas:

The Ariège plain

The north of the department consists of plains, hills and low valleys where agriculture is prevalent. Part of Lauragais covers the northeast of the department. Two major rivers, the Ariège and the Lèze, traverse the plain from south to north. A landscape of grain fields dominates the scene with growing of sweetcorn and sunflowers and with prairies.

The Pyrenean foothills

This area includes the Plantaurel mountains and the Pre-Pyrenean hills below 1000 m. Various geological structures are present in contrast: the Foix Valley with its granite mountain landscape and the Lavelanet region with marl and limestone.

Ariège high country

The geography is dominated by the Pyrenees mountains exceeding 1,000 m above sea level which form the border between France and Spain. The Pica d'Estats (3143 m), the Pic de Montcalm (3077 m), and Pic de Sotllo (3072 m) are the highest points of the department. These peaks are clearly visible from Toulouse in the Haute Garonne.

The landscape is dominated by forests with coniferous species coexisting with hardwoods such as chestnut trees, Black Locust trees, ash trees, and beech trees.

Roc Blanc, 2542 metres, south-east Ariège - a summit that attracts many walkers.

There are hundreds of kilometres of marked paths which allow exploration of the Pyrenees mountains. The high mountains are easily accessible via good roads, cable cars or by foot. There are a number of lodges providing high level mountain accommodation. There are also a number of fresh water lakes which provide a variety of activities including, walking, swimming, fishing, canoeing, sailboarding and picnicking.

There are several downhill ski resorts, the three largest being Ax-Bonascre, Les Monts D'Olmes and Guzet-Neige. There are many cross-country skiing resorts, one of them being at Plateau de Beille, near Les Cabannes. The locals enjoy keeping traditions alive, especially old farming techniques. Consequently, as fewer insecticides have been used, the flora and fauna of the area continue to be diverse and numerous. Butterflies are common and birds are numerous; particularly noticeable are large birds of prey, including the Griffon vultures.

There are also many villages and hamlets tucked away in the valleys close to the department's border with Spain – Seix, Cominac, and Aulus-les-Bains are examples – together with mountain villages, including Aleu.

== Climate ==
Ariège stands on the eastern limit of oceanic dominance over rainfall, but other influences are felt:

- Mediterranean – particularly visible in the vegetation of the foothills and of the valley of the Ariège river towards Tarascon, and in the Sault country
- Continental – in the Pyrenean valleys, with many storms and big differences of temperature between day and night

There is no great tendency to summer drought, as the flow of air from the north-west brings rain throughout the year. Rainfall is moderate on the foothills and in some sheltered valleys, measuring 700 to 1,000 mm per year, but increases significantly in the higher valleys with levels between 1,000 mm and 1,800 mm. The slopes exposed to the north-west, such as Aulus and Orlu, are the wettest, together with the frontal ridges that meet air flow from the southwest (giving rise to the Foehn effect). Snow cover is common over 1,000 metres, lasting several months above 1,500 to 2,000 metres. Some periglacial areas exist over 2,500 m but the only true glacier in Ariège is that of Mont Valier, near Castillon-en-Couserans.

Temperatures are mild in the foothills, most notably at the city of Foix (400 metres) the average is 5 °C in January and 19 °C in July. However, they decline rapidly with elevation, e.g. at l'Hospitalet-près-l'Andorre (1,430 m) it is 0 °C in January and 14 °C in July.

Comparison of local Meteorological data with other cities in France
Town	Sunshine (hours/yr)	Rain (mm/yr)	Snow (days/yr)	Storm (days/yr)	Fog (days/yr)
National average	1,973	770	14	22	40
Saint Girons	1,935	952	13	29	20
Paris	1,661	637	12	18	10
Nice	2,724	767	1	29	1
Strasbourg	1,693	665	29	29	56
Brest	1,605	1,211	7	12	75

Climate data for Saint Girons
Month	Jan	Feb	Mar	Apr	May	Jun	Jul	Aug	Sep	Oct	Nov	Dec	Year
Mean daily maximum °C (°F)	10.3 (50.5)	11.3 (52.3)	14.2 (57.6)	16.0 (60.8)	19.5 (67.1)	22.9 (73.2)	25.5 (77.9)	25.6 (78.1)	23.0 (73.4)	19.0 (66.2)	13.7 (56.7)	10.9 (51.6)	17.7 (63.9)
Daily mean °C (°F)	5.3 (41.5)	6.2 (43.2)	8.8 (47.8)	10.6 (51.1)	14.2 (57.6)	17.7 (63.9)	20.0 (68.0)	20.0 (68.0)	17.1 (62.8)	13.5 (56.3)	8.6 (47.5)	5.9 (42.6)	12.3 (54.1)
Mean daily minimum °C (°F)	0.3 (32.5)	1.1 (34.0)	3.3 (37.9)	5.2 (41.4)	8.9 (48.0)	12.5 (54.5)	14.5 (58.1)	14.3 (57.7)	11.2 (52.2)	8.0 (46.4)	3.5 (38.3)	0.9 (33.6)	7.0 (44.6)
Average precipitation mm (inches)	83 (3.3)	62 (2.4)	80 (3.1)	105 (4.1)	102 (4.0)	77 (3.0)	52 (2.0)	73 (2.9)	73 (2.9)	80 (3.1)	82 (3.2)	83 (3.3)	952 (37.5)
Average precipitation days (≥ 1 mm)	10.3	9.2	10.5	11.9	12.0	9.4	6.9	8.8	8.7	10.4	9.8	9.8	117.7
Mean monthly sunshine hours	119	130	169	169	179	189	205	207	190	152	117	109	1,935
Source: Meteorological data for Saint Girons – 411 m altitude, from 1981 to 2010 January 2015 (in French)

== History ==
Ariège in 1790

Ariège is one of the original 83 departments created during the French Revolution on 4 March 1790 under the Act of 22 December 1789. It was created from the counties of Foix (Languedoc) and Couserans (Gascogne).

A request was made to the Council of State to rename the department Ariège-Pyrénées. According to the proponents of this project, the word "Pyrenees" would better position the department to promote itself throughout France. The demand was rejected.

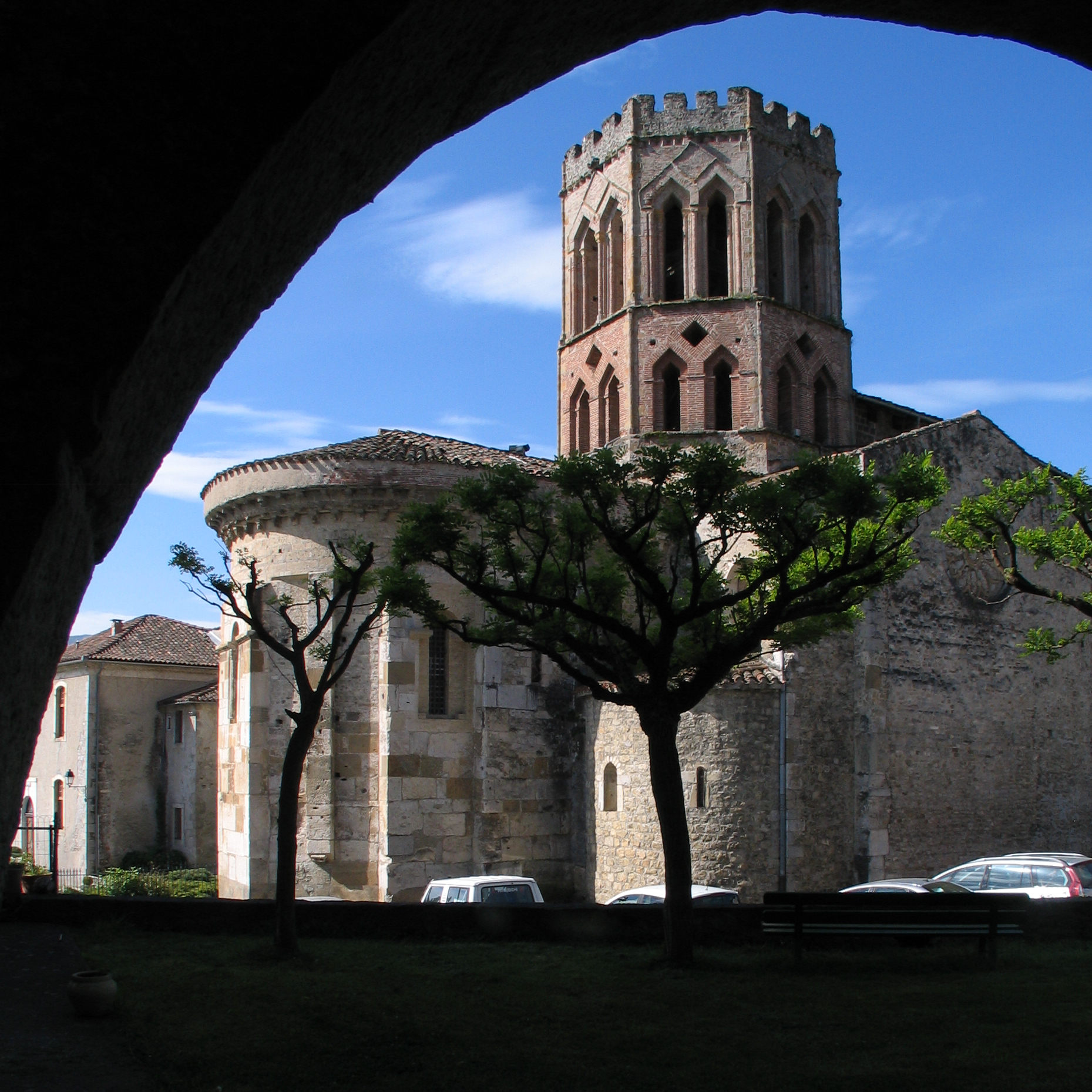
Saint-Lizier Cathedral

Foix is the administrative capital of the Ariège. It is an ancient medieval town with a fortress, Chateau de Foix, perched on a hill overlooking it. The fortress has been attacked many times without being captured including an attempt by Simon de Montfort. It has also been used as a prison, and the names of English prisoners of war can still be seen on the cell walls. Another famous castle in the Ariège is Montségur, located on a rocky outcrop at a height of 1200 metres. During the Albigensian Crusade and siege in 1244 the castle was largely destroyed, with more than two hundred Cathar priests burnt at the stake as heretics. The castle was gradually rebuilt by Royalists over the next three hundred years.

The start of the seventeenth century saw the area ravaged by the Huguenot rebellions of Protestants against Catholics. In 1621 the Huguenot forces ruined the church at La Tour-du-Crieu. In 1629 Pamiers was sacked by Henry of Condé following uprisings that left several hundred dead in the city. This was also the period during which the abbeys at Foix, Tarascon-sur-Ariège, Saint-Girons, Saverdun and Le Mas-d'Azil were torched and destroyed.

The nineteenth century was a time of strong industrial growth, supported in Ariège by an abundant supply of water power. The department also benefited from its significant reserves of iron ore. The growth of iron-based industries was a feature of the period with the establishment, in 1817, of a steel manufacturing plant at Pamiers. This has been the principal driver of the local economy ever since. Other representative examples of the iron-based industries that developed in Ariège during the nineteenth century include the forges at Montgaillard and the blast furnaces at Tarascon-sur-Ariège.

An additional part of the department's industrial development during the nineteenth century was the paper industry at Saint-Girons and the textile industry in the Pays d'Olmes. Changes in forest laws in 1829 resulted in the War of the Maidens, a revolt by peasants who resisted losing their rights to use the forests. They disguised themselves as women while performing acts of rebellion.

Towns of particular historical interest in the department include Pamiers, which hosted a large commercial centre and three churches; Mirepoix, a medieval town; and Saint-Lizier, which is situated on a hilltop with winding streets, fine views, and a church with cloisters that are noteworthy. Saint-Girons is an agricultural centre with a Saturday market.

=== Heraldry ===
Arms of Ariège department	The red and gold represents the County of Foix and the bell is the emblem of Couserans, countries of the former province of Gascogne. This blazon, proposed by Robert Louis, is not official. Blazon: Or, with 3 pales of gules and escutcheon of azure charged with a bell in argent.

=== Anthem of Ariège ===
The patriotic song Arièjo O moun Pais was written by Father Sabas Maury, born on 1 March 1863 in Gestiès in the valley of Siguer. He was the pastor of Miglos and Varilhes. It became the anthem for Ariège.

== Economy ==
The Ariège department is a largely unknown department which is situated next to Aude in the southwestern part of the Occitanie region. It shares its borders with Aude, Andorra, Haute-Garonne and Pyrénées-Orientales.

It is predominantly a farming area, as the soil is rich and fertile. More than 50% of Ariège is mountainous, with 490,965 hectares being covered by forests.

Economic Activity
Economic Data	Value	Date
Business Creation	814	2005
No. of Businesses	19,750	15 Nov 2006
Rate of Business Creation	10.4% (Ariège) 9.3% (Midi-Pyrénées) 9.3% (France)	2003
Unemployment Rate	10.4% (Ariège) 9.1% (Midi-Pyrénées) 9% (France)	Sep 2006
Exports	€450m	2005
Imports	€368m	2005
source : Ariège expansion		

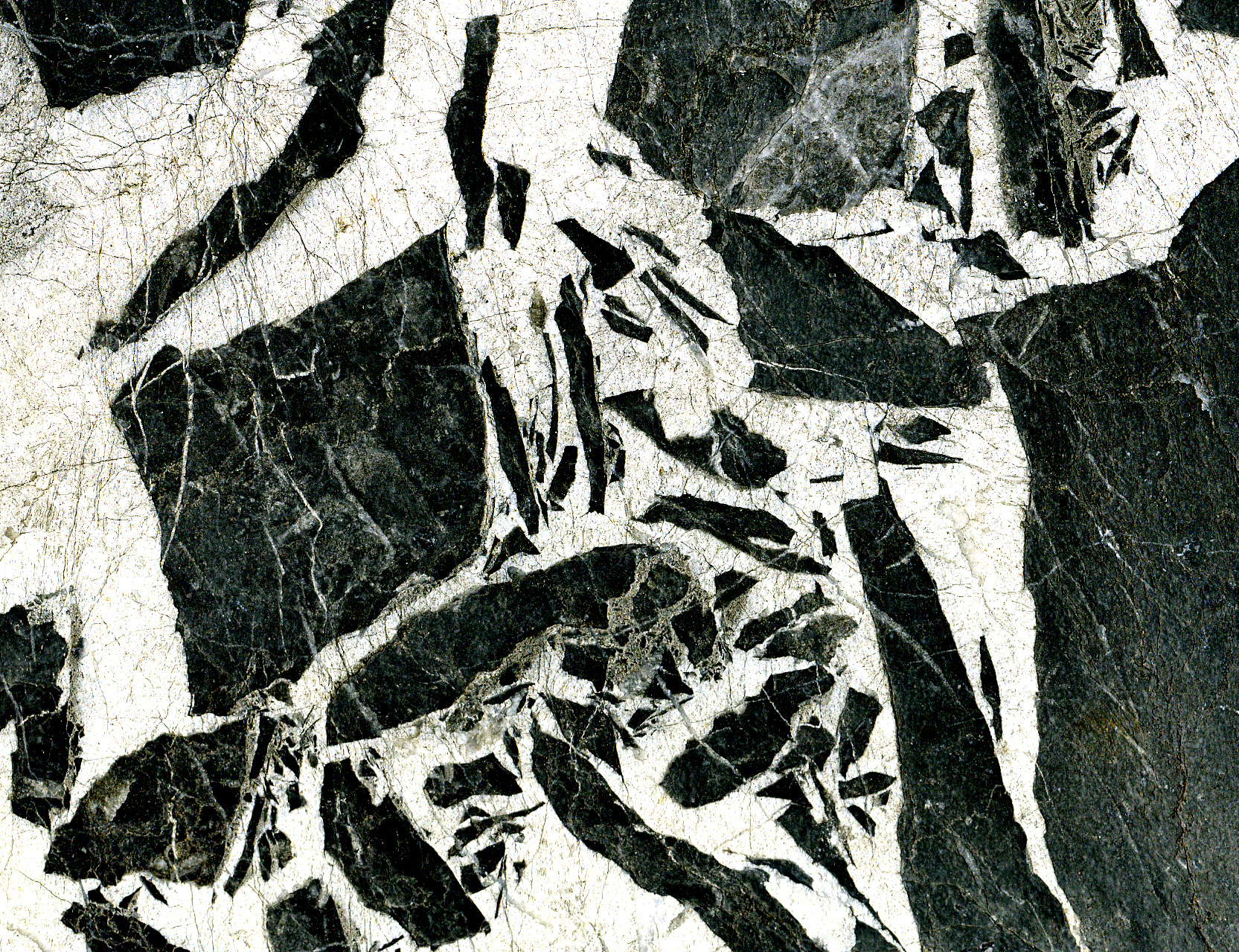
Limestone breccia, polished stone marketed as "French Grand Antique Marble". Old quarry at Aubert, Lez Valley, southwest of Saint-Girons, western Ariège Department.

In the Ax valleys, the mining of talc is the most typical activity. The processing plant for talc at Luzenac is supplied by Carrière de talc de Trimouns, which is the largest producer in the region (400,000 tonnes per year).

This industry is supplemented by tourism. Winter sports resorts are located at Ax 3 Domaines, Ascou-Pailhères, Plateau de Beille, Le Chioula, and Goulier Neige.

In the Lavelanet area, the textile industry used to be significant, but much of the industry has moved out of the country and offshore. A few companies have tried to persist in the face of competition from lower cost-labor in Eastern Europe and Asia. New craftspeople installed themselves in the abandoned factories, like the brewery Le Grand Bison, now active for several years and counting gold and silver rewards for their beers.

In the Pamiers area metallurgy, aeronautics, and chemistry are the main industries. Metallurgy, at the Aubert & Duval factory, produces forgings for the aerospace and energy industries. Several companies are in the aeronautics outsourcing industry, such as Recaero and Maz'Air, partners with aircraft manufacturers. Chemistry is represented by the paint industry with the Alliance Maestria, which includes several companies making paint for anything from buildings to aircraft. In the same sector, Etienne Lacroix in the commune of Mazères, mainly manufactures fireworks and pyrotechnics.

For the Saint-Girons area, industry is in decline. It is represented mainly by the production of paper.

Hydroelectric production from Ariège is about one-fifth of Pyrenean production. The hydroelectric plant at Aston has the largest annual production capacity in the Pyrenees (392 million kWh). With Orlu and L'Hospitalet-près-l'Andorre, these three plants have the largest capacity in the department. The hydroelectric developments in Ariège can support a city of 600,000 inhabitants. Large industrial plants use the energy produced together with the natural gas from Lacq.

The Ariège Chamber of Commerce and Industry is situated at Foix. The department's Economic Development Agency ("Ariège Expansion") is at Verniolle. The department has established three 'business incubators' to support enterprise in Ariège.

== Transportation ==
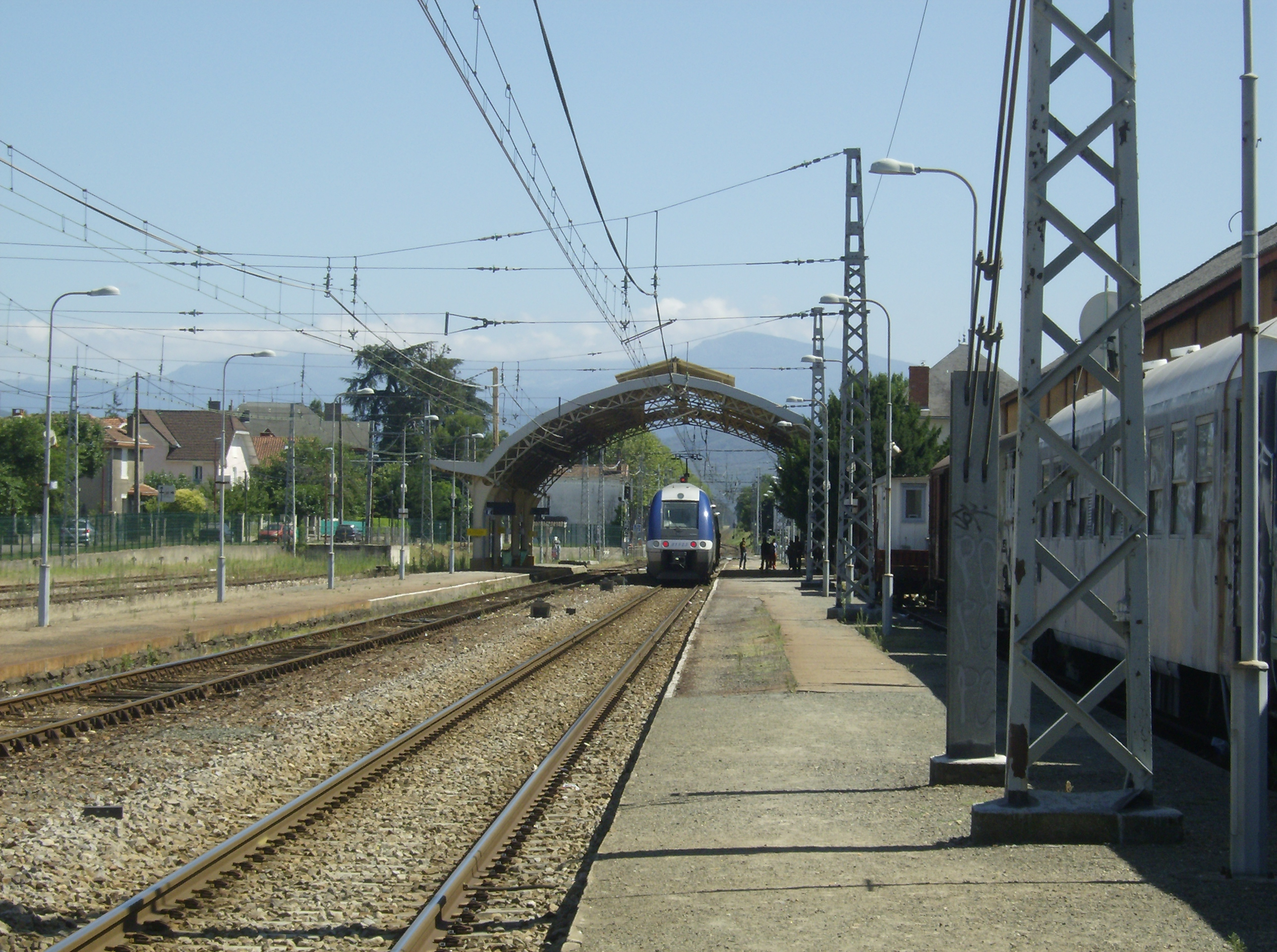
A train arriving in Pamiers station.

Mostly mountainous and rural, the department of Ariège is far from the main transport routes serving the main valleys and coastlines. The railway arrived in the department in 1861 with the Toulouse to Puigcerda line which is the only line that remains open to this day in the department. Besides TER Occitanie trains, this route is still served by Intercity trains from Paris-Austerlitz.

Since 2002 Ariège has been connected to the national motorway network via the A66 autoroute which joins the A61 autoroute at Villefranche-de-Lauragais and continues south of Pamiers by the National Route NR20 as a dual carriageway as far as Tarascon-sur-Ariège.

The nearest airports to the department are Toulouse-Blagnac Airport and La Seu d'Urgell Airport.

== Demographics ==
Historical population

Year	Pop.	±% p.a.
1791	197,889	—
1801	196,454	−0.07%
1821	234,878	+0.90%
1831	253,730	+0.78%
1841	265,607	+0.46%
1851	267,435	+0.07%
1861	251,850	−0.60%
1872	246,298	−0.20%
1881	240,601	−0.26%
1891	227,491	−0.56%
1901	210,527	−0.77%
1911	198,725	−0.58%
1921	172,851	−1.39%
1931	161,265	−0.69%

Year	Pop.	±% p.a.
1936	155,134	−0.77%
1946	145,956	−0.61%
1954	140,010	−0.52%
1962	137,192	−0.25%
1968	138,478	+0.16%
1975	137,857	−0.06%
1982	135,725	−0.22%
1990	136,455	+0.07%
1999	137,205	+0.06%
2007	148,568	+1.00%
2012	152,366	+0.51%
2017	153,153	+0.10%
2023	155,722	+0.28%

The populations of the arrondissements are (2023):

- Arrondissement of Foix – 48,575
- Arrondissement of Pamiers – 66,001
- Arrondissement of Saint-Girons – 41,146

=== Principal towns ===
The most populous commune is Pamiers; the prefecture Foix is the second-most populous. As of 2019, there are 10 communes with more than 3,000 inhabitants:

Commune	Population (2023)
Pamiers	16,473
Foix	9,934
Saint-Girons	6,008
Lavelanet	5,987
Saverdun	4,808
Mazères	3,852
Varilhes	3,487
La Tour-du-Crieu	3,230
Mirepoix	3,172
Tarascon-sur-Ariège	3,085

The main urban areas are those of Pamiers, Foix and Saint-Girons.

=== Housing ===
According to INSEE as of 2020 24.7% of available housing in Ariège consisted of secondary residences. The following table indicates the main communes in Ariège (population more than 1,000) where second homes or occasional residences comprise more than 10% of total housing.

Communes with more than 10% Secondary Residences (2017)

Town	Population	Number of homes	Second homes	% second homes
Ax-les-Thermes	1,267	3,481	2,716	78.0%
Bélesta	1,064	861	186	21.6%
Mercus-Garrabet	1,199	726	118	16.3%
Le Mas-d'Azil	1,166	746	116	15.6%
Saint-Paul-de-Jarrat	1,313	741	104	14.0%
Saint-Lizier	1,418	820	112	13.7%
Tarascon-sur-Ariège	3,044	1,880	241	12.8%

== Politics ==
The department has two parliamentary constituencies and 13 cantons. In general it can be said that: "With a republican and secular tradition since the Third Republic, Ariège is firmly held by the Socialist Party (PS) even though in recent years the right has managed to sink a few corners of the fortress".

This resulted in a parliamentary representation until 2017 was dominated by the PS and a General Council where 19 of the 22 members were PS or close to this party – the political orientation of the department is therefore clearly identified. In 2007 it was the department with the most votes for Ségolène Royal (59.56%). In 2012 it had the third most voters for François Hollande in France with 64.69% after Corrèze and Seine Saint-Denis.

Constituency	Member	Party
Ariège's 1st constituency	Martine Froger	PS
Ariège's 2nd constituency	Laurent Panifous	PS

Although male/female parity is well respected by MPs (Mrs. Frédérique Massat and Mr. Alain Fauré), all 22 councillors were men until 2011 when two women were elected.

The President of the Departmental Council is Christine Tequi of the Socialist Party.

Party		seats
•	Socialist Party	18
	Union for a Popular Movement	2
	Miscellaneous Right	1
•	Miscellaneous Left	1

== Culture ==
The region was originally part of Aquitaine and has retained many hallmarks of the Gascon culture and Gascon language.

=== Gastronomy ===
The gastronomy of Ariège is based on the cooking of Pyrenean regional food, such as cheese or charcuterie from the mountain country. Azinat is the local and typical dish of Ariège. The department is also well advanced in the field of organic farming.

=== Films ===
- 1975: Le Passe-Montagne (The Mountain Pass), author Christian Bernadac, director Jean Vernier (television film)
- 1980: L'Orsalhèr by Jean Fléchet
- 1982: Le Retour de Martin Guerre, by Daniel Vigne
- 2009: No pasarán, film by Éric Martin and Emmanuel Caussé filmed in the Vicdessos Valley (Miglos Lapège) near Saint-Girons in the Couserans at Foix and at Tarascon-sur-Ariège

=== Literature ===
- Several novels by Louis Henry Destel are set in Ariège.
- The detective story by Pascal Dessaint Les Pis rennais (The Octopus) is set in the Couserans. It has been reprinted in comics.
- Most of the novels by George-Patrick Gleize published by the Parisian publisher Albin Michel feature Ariège or the Pyrenees such as Le Temps en héritage (Foix country), Un brin d'espérance (A strand of hope) (Olmes country), Rue des Hortensias Rouge (Ax-les-Thermes country), Le Forgeron de la liberté (Mirepoix country), Le Sentier des pastelliers (Mazéres region), La Vie en plus (Couserans), Le Destin de Marthe Rivière (Le Quérigut), Le Chemin de Peyreblanque or L'Auberge des myrtilles (Tarascon country), Une nuit en juin (Cerdagne and Pamiers region).

=== Music ===
- Mirepoix Musique promotes concerts of classical music, talks and readings in and around Mirepoix.
- Making Music at Malegoude
- Vocal Festival of La Bellongaise at Orgibet
- Jazz at Foix
- Garosnow at Ax-les-Thermes
- Art Show, contemporary music room (Holy Cross volvestre)

=== Theatre ===
- MiMa is an international festival of the art of marionettes held every summer in Mirepoix. Each year the event is guided by a central theme. The line-up showcases a variety of techniques including object theatre, glove puppets, string puppets and marionettes portées (puppets carried by a handle on the back of the head).

== Tourism ==
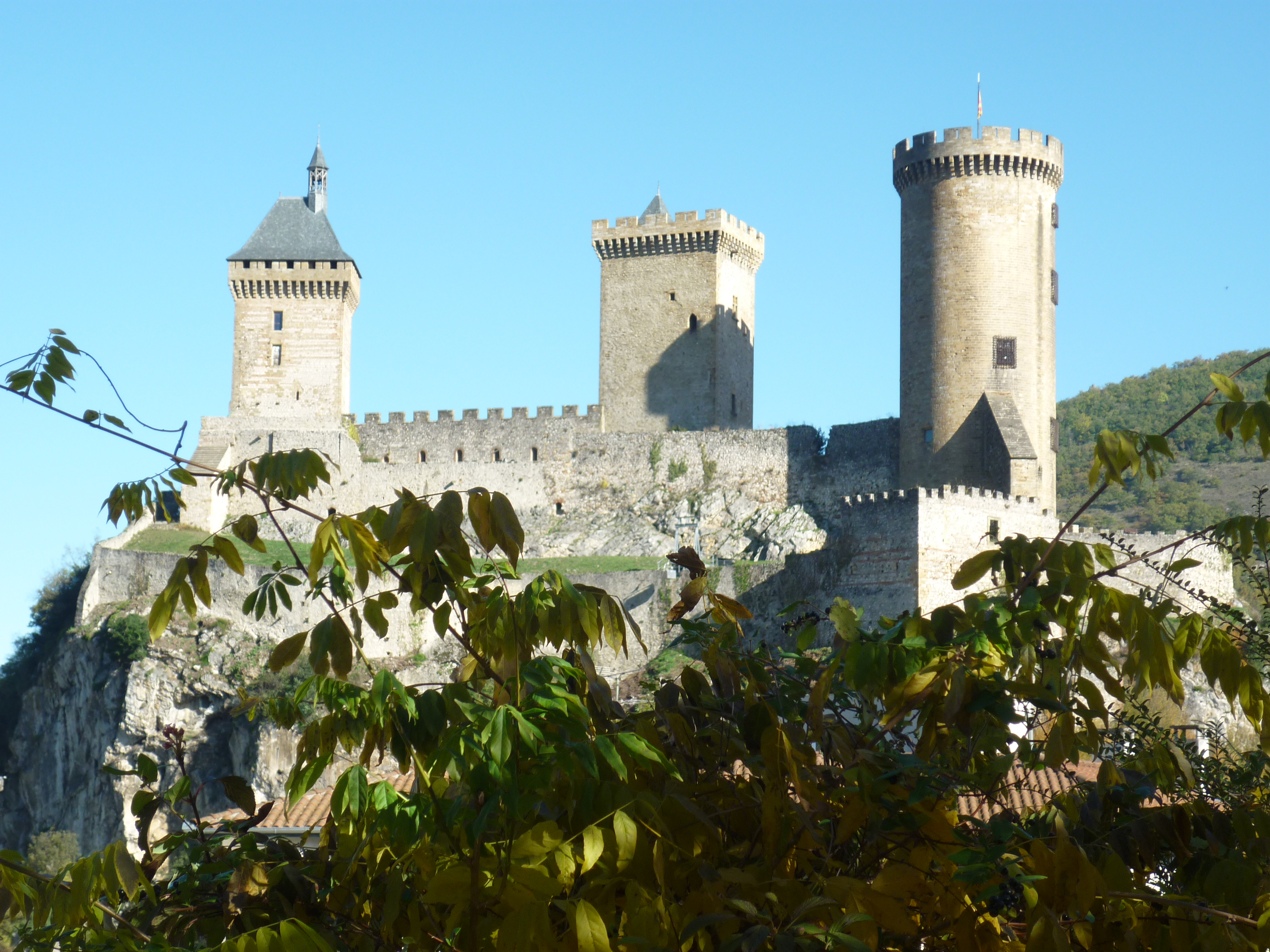
The castle of Foix

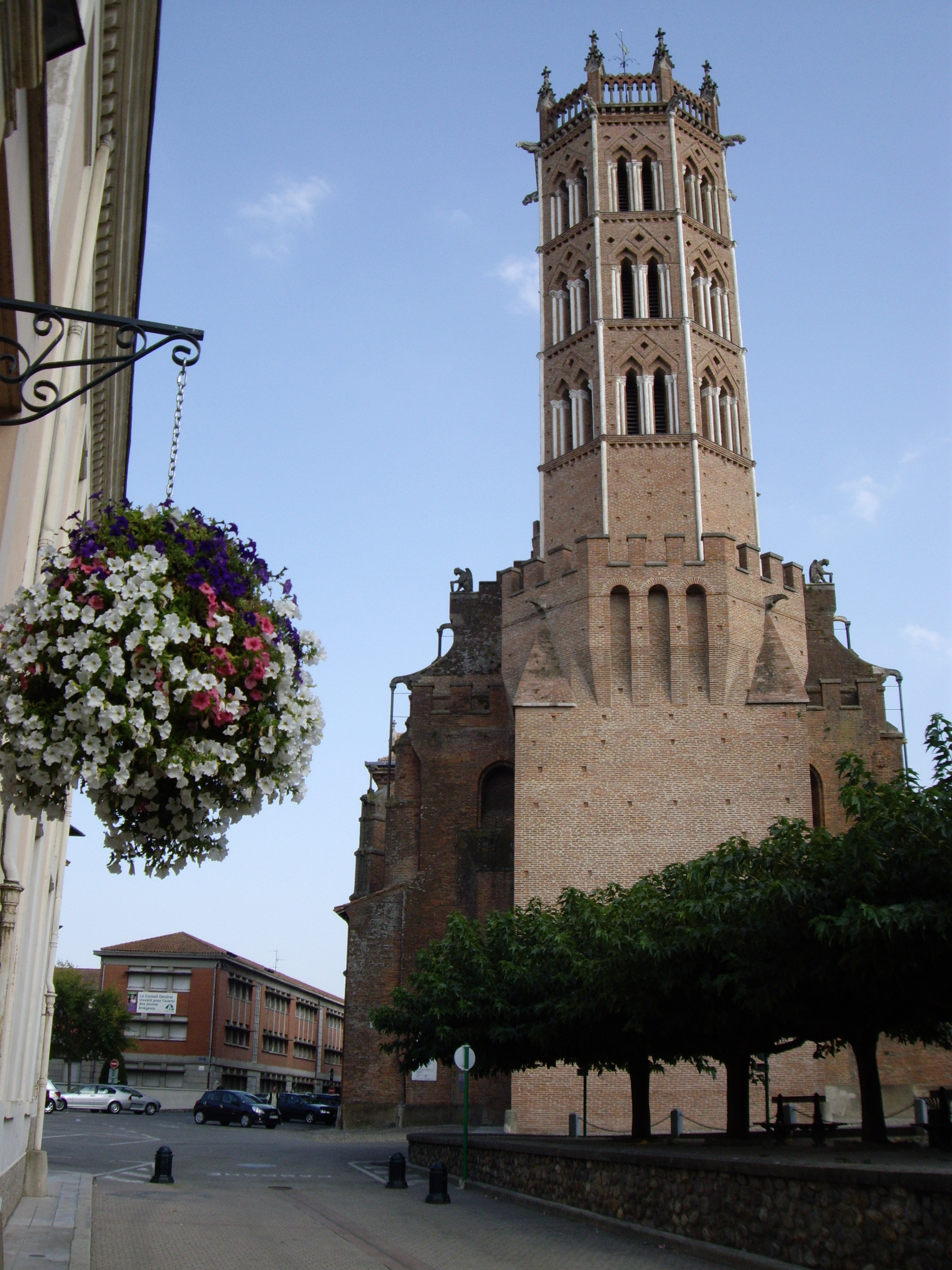
Cathedral of Saint-Antonin at Pamiers

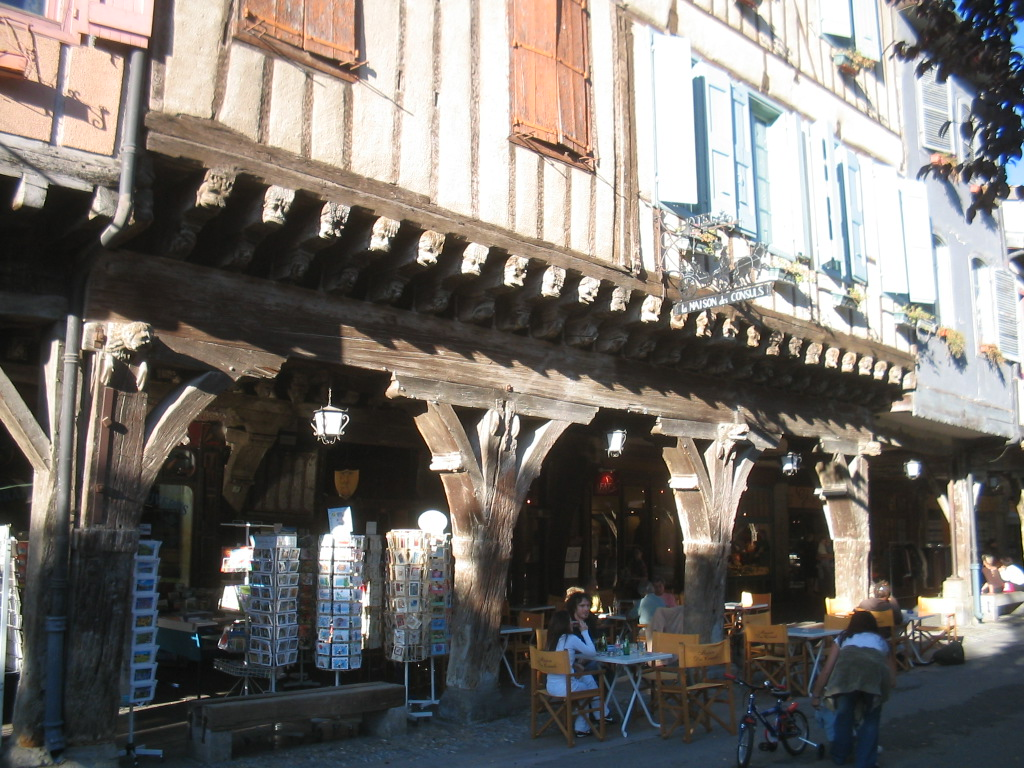
Covered shopfronts at Mirepoix

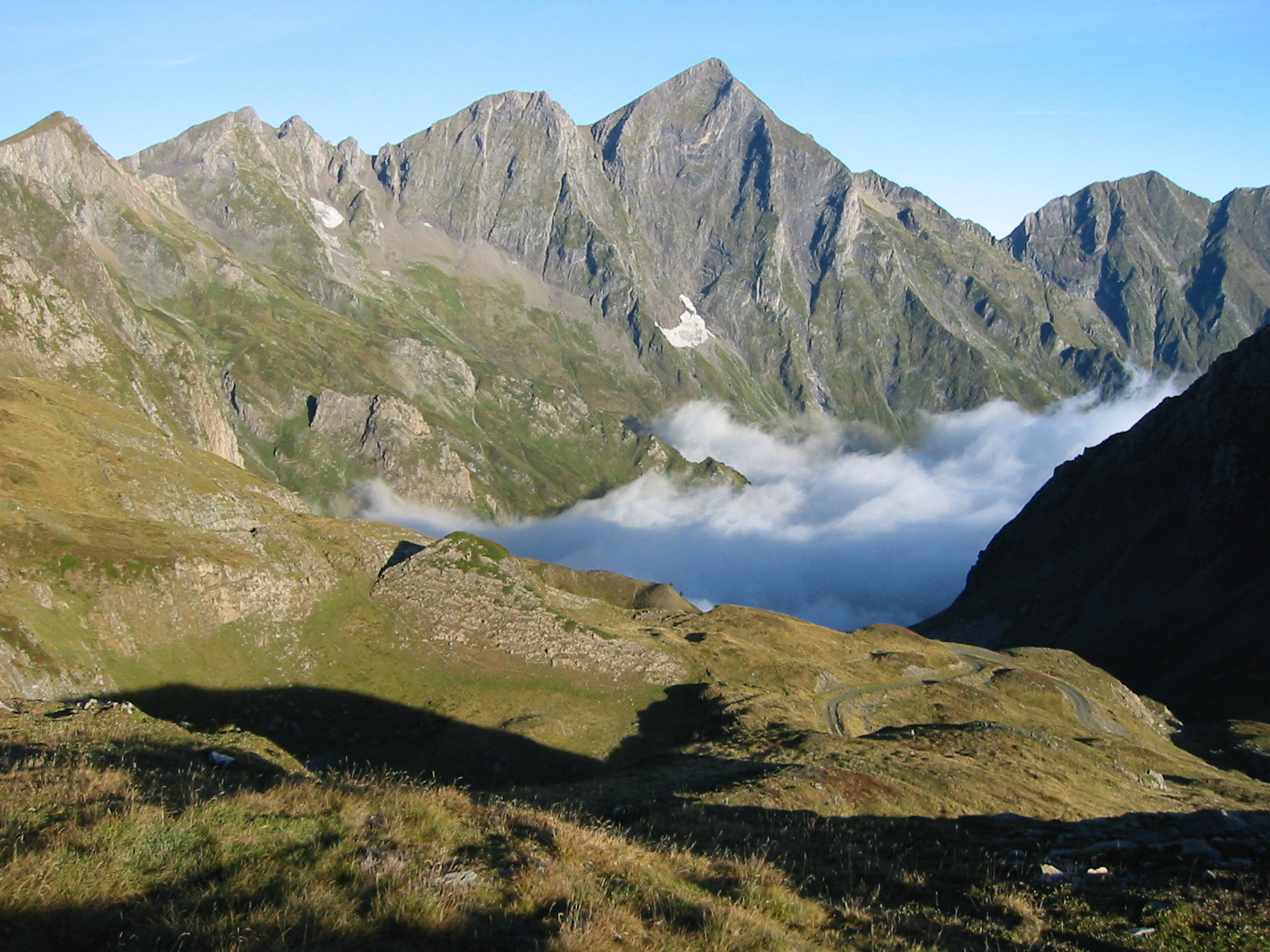
Mont Valier seen from the road to Port d'Aula in the Haut Couserans

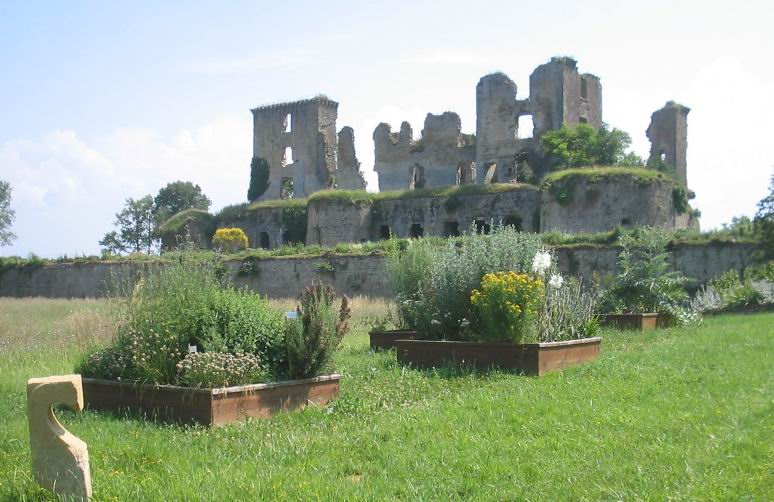
The Château de Lagarde

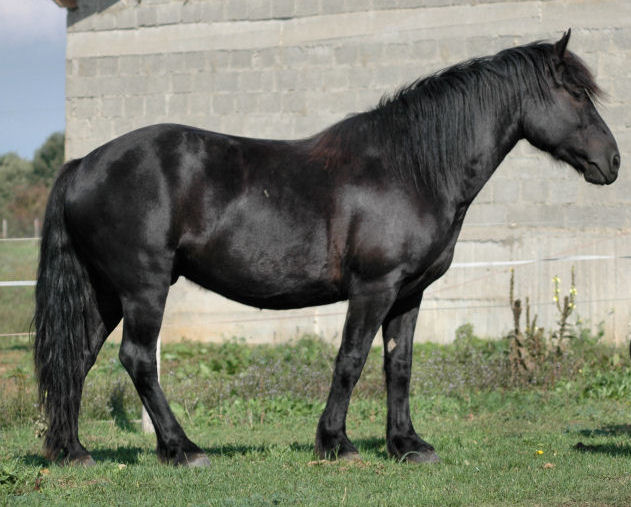
A Mérens horse

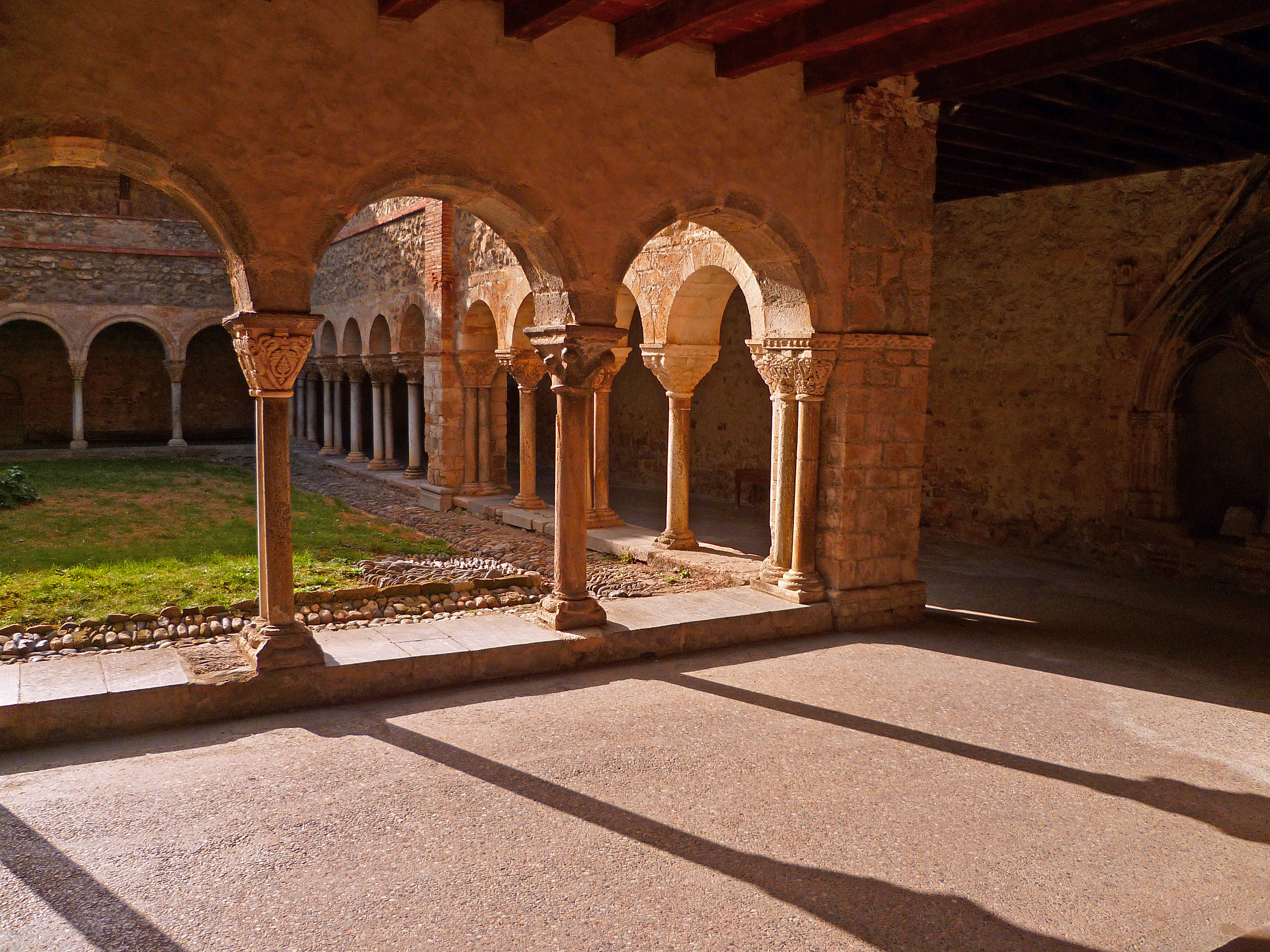
The cloister in the Saint-Lizier Cathedral

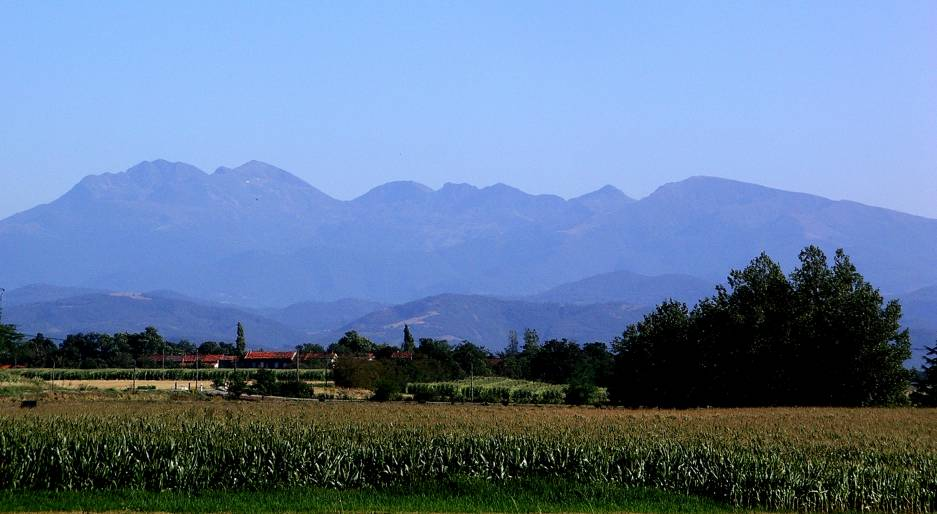
The Massif of Tabe

== People ==
=== Art ===
- Joseph Bergès (1878–1956), born in Saint-Girons, was a painter.
- René Gaston-Lagorre (1913–2004) was a painter who had his workshop in Couserans and lived in Seix.
- Pierre Daboval (1918–2015) was an artist. He lived in Mirepoix from 1998 until his death.
- Mady de La Giraudière (1922–2018) was a painter born in Lavelanet.
- Roger Bataille (1926–1962), born in Foix, was a painter.
- Christian d'Orgeix (1927–2019), the surrealist painter, was born in Foix.

=== Film ===
- Terence Macartney-Filgate (1924–2022) was a British-Canadian film director living in Mirepoix. He directed, wrote, produced or shot more than 100 films in a career spanning more than 50 years.
- Richard Stanley (1966–), the South African film director, lives in Montségur

=== Literature ===
- Marie de Calages (1630–1661), born in Mirepoix, was a poet, crowned many times by l'Académie des Jeux Floraux.
- Pierre Bayle (1647–1706), philosopher and writer born at Carla-Bayle (then called Carla-le-Comte; the commune was renamed in his honour)
- Frédéric Soulié (1800–1847), novelist born in Foix, lived as a boy in Mirepoix
- Napoléon Peyrat, born in 1809 at Les Bordes-sur-Arize, died in 1881, pastor, historian of the Cathars and a poet
- Marie-Louise (born 1876 in Mirepoix) and Raymond Escholier (born 1882 in Paris), co-authors of "regionalist" novels such as Cantegril which won the Prix Fémina in 1922
- Isabelle Sandy (1884–1975), writer born in Saint-Pierre-de-Rivière
- Louis-Henry Destel (1885–1962), novelist born in Lézat-sur-Lèze, died at Saint-Girons.
- Marcel Pagnol (1895–1974), the novelist, playwright and filmmaker, taught at the École Supérieure in Mirepoix.
- Raymond Abellio (Georges Soulès) (1907–1986) philosopher, novelist. His paternal family came from Ax-les-Thermes and his maternal family was from Seix in Haut-Couserans
- Gaston Massat (1909–1966), surrealist poet and resistance fighter born in Saint-Girons
- Michel-Aimé Baudouy (1909–1999), scholar, novelist, and playwright born in Vernet d'Ariège
- Max-Firmin Leclerc (1923–2014), writer and television director, lived in the commune of Durfort (Maloureille) from 1974 to 1988
- Christian Bernadac (1937–2003), journalist and writer born in Tarascon-sur-Ariège
- Georges-Patrick Gleize (1952–), novelist and historian
- Patrick Cintas (1954–), writer, painter, sculptor, and composer
- Remy Marrot (author of the novel 'Le Tribunal du peuple') teaches in Pamiers.

=== Music ===
- Aycart del Fossat (fl.1250–68) was a troubadour from Le Fossat
- Gabriel Fauré (1845–1924), composer, born in Pamiers
- Marie Laforêt (1939–2019) singer and actress. She defined herself as "Ariégeoise". Granddaughter of Louis Doumenach, founder of Lavelanet, a textile company
- Christian Ton Ton Salut (1953–) is a jazz musician. He lived in Pamiers from 1958 to 1977 and began his musical career with Marc Feinder's orchestra in 1970
- Daniel Lassalle (1965–), born in Lavelanet, is a baroque trombonist and sackbut player

=== Politics ===
- Marc Guillaume Alexis Vadier (1736–1828), politician, member of the National Convention, creator of the department of Ariège
- Joseph Lakanal (1762–1845), born in Serres-sur-Arget, member of the National Convention
- Alfred de Jancigny (1824–1892), préfect of Ariège in 1864
- Léon Galy-Gasparrou (1850–1921), MP for Ariège
- Alpinien Pabot-Chatelard (1837-1929), préfect of Ariège from 1892 to 1898
- Théophile Delcassé (1852–1923), politician, several times Minister of Foreign Affairs, in particular during the conclusion of the Entente cordiale with Great Britain, born in Pamiers
- Paul Caujolle (1891–1955), Mayor of Siguer, General Counsel of Ariège and President of the National Assocuiation of Accountants
- Pierre Dumas (1891–1968), born and died at Saint-Martin-d'Oydes (where an avenue is named after him), writer and journalist, great resistance fighter known as "Saint Jean", politician, MP for Haute-Garonne
- François Camel (1893–1941), MP for Ariège from 1936 to 1941 and resistance fighter
- Georges Galy-Gasparrou (1896–1977), MP, Secretary of State for Information, Mayor of Massat
- Roger Fauroux (1926–2021), Minister, Mayor of Saint-Girons
- Augustin Bonrepaux (1936–), politician, former MP for Ariège and President of the General Council of Ariège, former president of the Finance Commission for the National Assembly. Participated in the opening of the road to Ariège particularly the Puymorens Tunnel
- Jean-Pierre Bel (1951–), senator, President of the Senate of France since 1 October 2011
- André Trigano (1925–2024) Officer of the Legion of Honour. He was Mayor of Mazères for 24 years, General Councillor for the Canton of Saverdun and MP for the 2nd electoral district of Ariège from 1993 to 1997. Mayor of Pamiers, he is also the brother of Gilbert Trigano, the co-founder of Club Med
- Paul Vaillant-Couturier (Paris 1892–1937) originally from Sainte-Croix-Volvestre
- Frédérique Massat (1964–), MP for Ariège from 2007 to 2017

=== Religion ===
- Jacques Fournier (1285–1342), Bishop of Pamiers then of Mirepoix, Pope under the name of Benedict XII from 1336 to 1342 (Avignon), born in Canté near Saverdun
- François de Caulet (1610–1680), Bishop of Pamiers
- Jean-François Boyer (1675–1755), Bishop of Mirepoix from 1730 to 1736, tutor to the Dauphin, Louis XV's son.
- Sabas Maury, Pastor of Miglos from 1890 to 1906 and creator of Arièjo ô moun Païs the well-known Ariége hymn
- Philippe Mousset, Bishop of Pamiers, Couserans, Mirepoix. Appointed on 8 January 2009 by Pope Benedict XVI

=== Science ===
- Raymond Augustin Mailhat (1862–1923) born in Saurat, was a manufacturer of telescopes and precision optical instruments.

=== Sport ===
- Louis-Henry Destel (1885–1962), rugby writer, born in Lézat-sur-Lèze
- Jacques Dupont (1928–2019), cyclist, Olympic record holder, born in Lézat-sur-Lèze
- Claude Piquemal (1939–), athlete, French sprinter, Olympic medallist, born in Siguer
- Aldo Quaglio (1932–2017), French international rugby player, born and trained in Lavelanet
- Jacques Crampagne (1944–), French international rugby player, born in Foix
- Patrick Estève (1959–), French international rugby player, born and trained in Lavelanet
- Jocelyn Degeihl (1959–), CN3 judo, vice champion of France, 1st Black Belt in the city of Foix
- Sylvain Dispagne (1968–), French international rugby player, born in Saint-Girons
- Jean-Louis Jordana (1968–), French international rugby player, born and trained in Lavelanet
- Laurent Bonzon (1969–), vice champion of Europe for Judo Jujitsu
- Michel Marfaing (1970–), French international rugby player, born and trained in Pamiers
- Fabien Barthez (1971–), French international football player, born in Lavelanet
- Eric Carrière (1973–), French international footballer, born in Foix
- Fabien Pelous (1973–), French international rugby player, born in Toulouse and trained in Saverdun
- Benoît Baby (1983–), French international rugby player, born in Lavelanet and trained in Toulouse
- Yoann Huget (1987–), French international rugby player, born in Pamiers and trained in Toulouse
- Jean-Marc Doussain (1991–), French international rugby player, born and trained in Toulouse, originally from Sainte-Croix-Volvestre

== See also ==
- Cantons of the Ariège department
- Communes of the Ariège department
- Arrondissements of the Ariège department
