= Arrondissements of the Ariège department =

Administrative divisions of Ariège, France

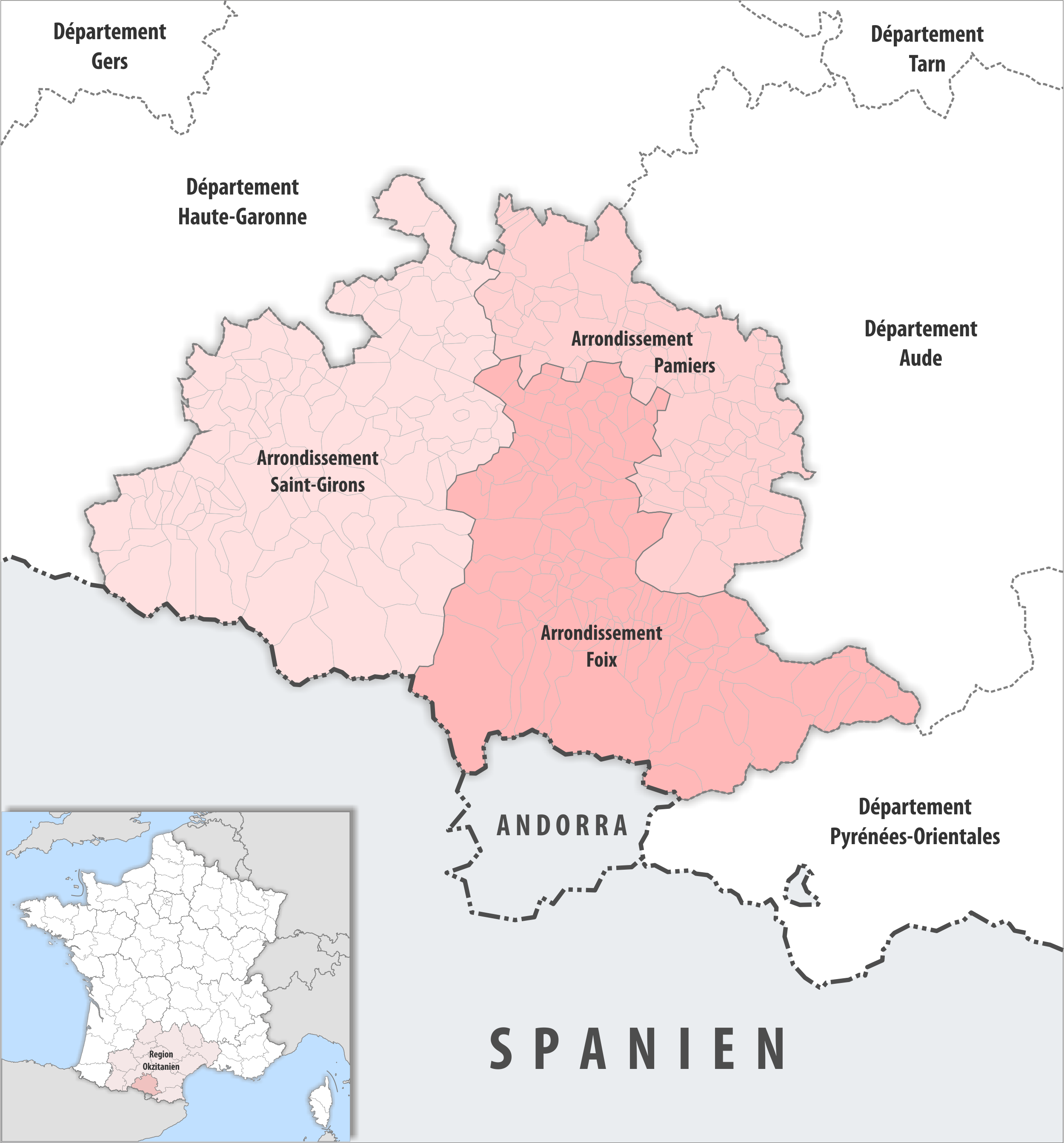
Map of arrondissements of the Ariège department.

The 3 arrondissements of the Ariège department are:

1. Arrondissement of Foix, (prefecture of the Ariège department: Foix) with 114 communes. The population of the arrondissement was 47,794 in 2021.
2. Arrondissement of Pamiers, (subprefecture: Pamiers) with 91 communes. The population of the arrondissement was 65,785 in 2021.
3. Arrondissement of Saint-Girons, (subprefecture: Saint-Girons) with 121 communes. The population of the arrondissement was 41,017 in 2021.

== History ==
In 1800 the arrondissements of Foix, Pamiers and Saint-Girons were established. The arrondissement of Pamiers was disbanded in 1926, and restored in 1942.

The borders of the arrondissements of Ariège were modified in January 2017:

- 21 communes from the arrondissement of Foix to the arrondissement of Pamiers
- 13 communes from the arrondissement of Foix to the arrondissement of Saint-Girons
- 18 communes from the arrondissement of Pamiers to the arrondissement of Foix
- 27 communes from the arrondissement of Pamiers to the arrondissement of Saint-Girons
