= Cantons of the Ariège department =

The following is a list of the 13 cantons of the Ariège department, in France, following the French canton reorganisation which came into effect in March 2015:

- Arize-Lèze
- Couserans Est
- Couserans Ouest
- Foix
- Haute-Ariège
- Mirepoix
- Pamiers-1
- Pamiers-2
- Pays d'Olmes
- Portes d'Ariège
- Portes du Couserans
- Sabarthès
- Val d'Ariège
