= Couserans =

Former county of France

Coordinates: 42.99°N 1.15°E

Coat of arms of Couserans

Couserans (French pronunciation: [kuz(ə)ʁɑ̃]; Gascon: Coserans [kuzeˈɾas]) is a former county of France located in the Pyrenees mountains. Today Couserans makes up the western half of the Ariège département, around the towns of Saint-Girons and Saint-Lizier. A small part of Couserans is also in the extreme south of Haute-Garonne, just across the border from Ariège.

Couserans has a land area of 1,162 km² (449 sq. miles). At the 1999 census there were 21,260 inhabitants on the territory of the former province of Couserans, which means a density of only 18 inhabitants per km² (47 inhabitants per sq. mile), one of the lowest densities in western Europe. The only urban area is Saint-Girons (which includes Saint-Lizier), with 9,484 inhabitants in 1999 (44.6% of the whole population of Couserans).

== History ==
=== Antiquity ===
Couserans was inhabited by a people whom the Romans called Consoranni. It seems the original inhabitants were Aquitanian, like in the rest of Gascony, and spoke a language related to the old Basque language. Later some Iberians who, like the Aquitanians, were non-Indo-European people, may have come from the Spanish peninsula and mixed with the inhabitants. Later in the 3rd century BC came the first Indo-Europeans, a Celtic Gallic tribe called the Volcae Tectosages, originally from Belgium or southern Germany, who settled in Toulouse, and may also have penetrated Couserans. However, if they entered Couserans, there were certainly not many of them, and the people whom the Romans called Consoranni were probably essentially Aquitanian. The Consoranni were closest to their western neighbors the Convenae (i.e. "the assembled") whose territory is known today as Comminges (a name derived from Convenae).

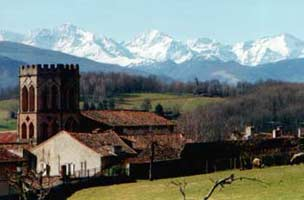
Saint-Lizier and the Pyrenees

The Consoranni had an oppidum on the hill which is now the town of Saint-Lizier, from which they controlled the area. The Romans seem to have come in contact with the Consoranni around 80 BC, and integrated the area inside the Roman Provincia (Provincia Romana — the usual name for what was officially called the province of Transalpine Gaul) which also included Toulouse and Narbonne on the Mediterranean Coast. After their conquest of Aquitania in around 50 BC, the Romans integrated Couserans inside the new province of Aquitania. Later when Aquitania was split, Couserans became part of the province of Novempopulana, like the rest of Gascony. Novempopulana corresponded roughly to the old territory of the Aquitanians, south of the river Garonne. Couserans was made one of the nine civitas of Novempopulana, known as the Civitas Consorannorum. The capital of the civitas was the old oppidum of the Consoranni, which the Romans named Austria, and which in the Middle Ages was renamed Saint-Lizier. The name Couserans comes from Consoranni. The Consoranni slowly adopted the Latin language, which later evolved into the Gascon language, like in the rest of Gascony.

=== Middle Ages ===
During the Middle Ages, Novempopulana became known as Vasconia (a name meaning "land of the Basques"), which evolved into Gascony. Gascony was split between several rival counties. The Couserans was created as an ancient border county by Charlemagne during his military campaigns in the area. A succession of the great regional lords, in later centuries, often held the title Count of Couserans with other titles such as for example Count of Foix. However, its remoteness meant that eventually a separately created Viscounty title came to be adopted. In 1180, the viscounty of Couserans was created and given to Roger of Comminges, brother of Count Bernard IV of Comminges, thus separating Couserans from Comminges, and reverting to the Roman situation when there was a Civitas Consorannorum (Couserans) distinct from the Civitas Convenarum (Comminges). At first the viscounty of Couserans only covered the upper areas of Couserans and did not include Saint-Lizier or Saint-Girons. The viscounty of Couserans was united to the French crown in the 1450s like the rest of the county of Comminges. Couserans became a French province of its own at that time, although some people still consider that Couserans is a sub-province inside the larger province of Gascony. In the Middle Ages, Couserans was not affected by the Cathar heresy, unlike the rest of southern France, and in the 16th century the bishops of Saint-Lizier successfully fought against Protestantism.

Saint-Lizier was the historical capital of Couserans, but it lost its status as seat of a Roman Catholic diocese (bishopric) at the time of the French Revolution, and has now been reduced to a small town, although it preserves some of the best medieval and Romanesque architecture in southern France. Saint-Girons, once a small suburb of Saint-Lizier, is now the largest town in Couserans and is regarded as its capital.

=== Modern times ===
In 1789 Couserans sent three representatives to the Estates-General in Versailles. When French départements were created in 1790, Couserans could have joined with Comminges to form a département, as history and geography suggested, but Saint-Girons and Saint-Gaudens (the largest town of Comminges) could not agree on which town would be the préfecture (capital). At the initiative of a representative of Pamiers (largest town in the County of Foix), Couserans was joined with the province of County of Foix to form the Ariège département. It was promised to Couserans that the préfecture would alternate between Foix, Pamiers, and Saint-Girons, but eventually the promise was betrayed and Foix became the only préfecture of Ariège. What's more, Pamiers replaced Saint-Lizier as the seat of the Roman Catholic diocese (bishopric). Despite being united inside a single département, the Gascon Couserans and the Languedocian County of Foix have always ignored each other, and still remain quite distinct. In terms of economic trade however, relations have seemingly always been pretty good.

Today, Couserans has no official status, although the arrondissement of Saint-Girons (one of the three arrondissements of Ariège) is what matches best the old province of Couserans. Couserans has suffered tremendously from rural exodus in the 20th century, and is now left with only 21,260 inhabitants, 44.6% of whom live in the urban area of Saint-Girons (which includes Saint-Lizier).
