= Lapeyrère, Haute-Garonne =

Lapeyrère
- Commune
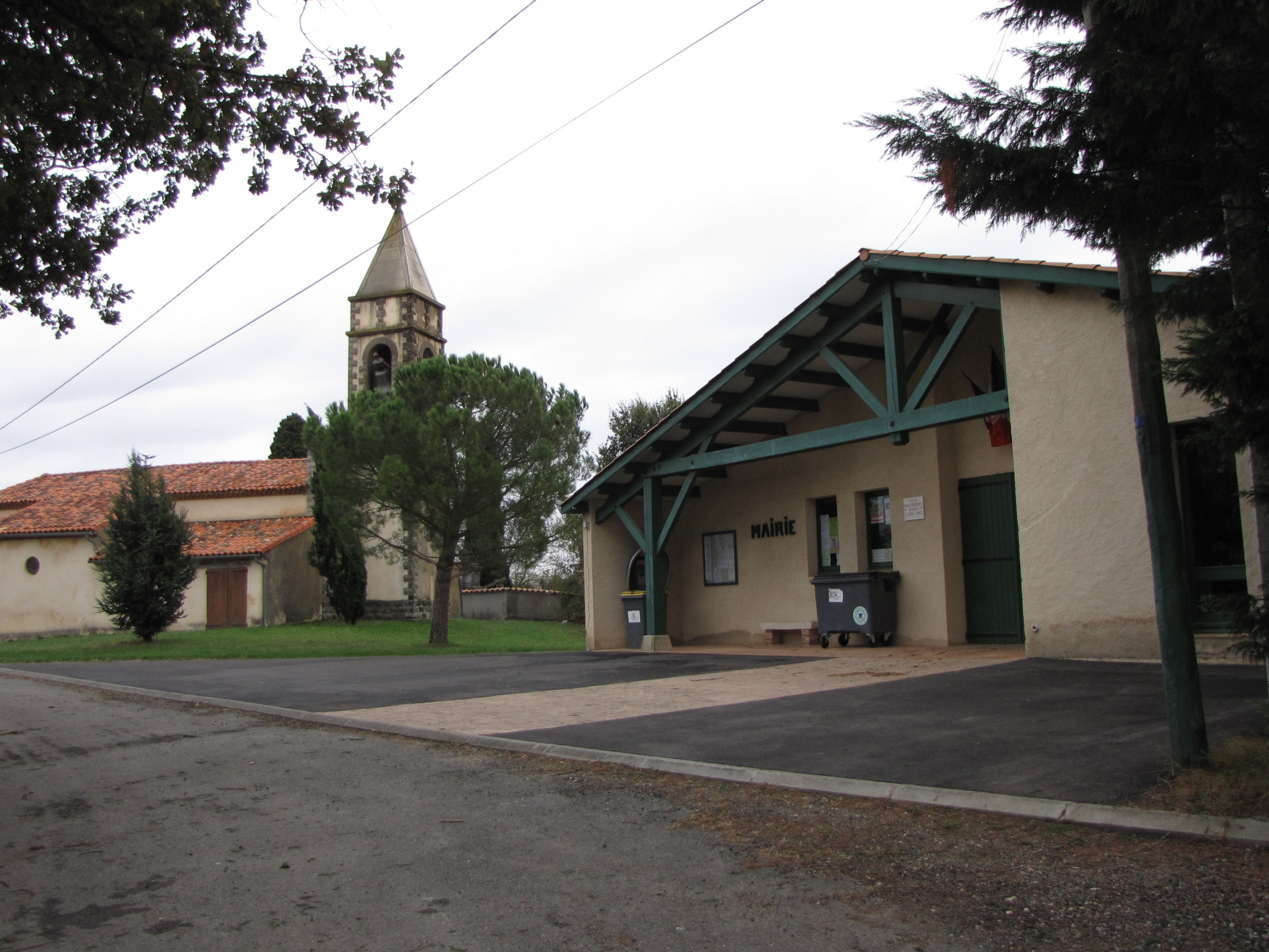
- The town hall in Lapeyrère
- Location of Lapeyrère
- Location within France Location within Occitanie
- Coordinates: 43°12′26″N 1°18′56″E
- Country: France
- Region: Occitania
- Department: Haute-Garonne
- Arrondissement: Muret
- Canton: Auterive
- Intercommunality: Volvestre

Government
  - Mayor (2021–2026): Carole Delor
- Area^{1}: 6.3 km^{2} (2.4 sq mi)
- Elevation: 395 m (1,296 ft)
- Highest elevation: 394 m (1,293 ft)
- Lowest elevation: 271 m (889 ft)
- Population (2023): 58
  - Density: 9.2/km^{2} (24/sq mi)
- Time zone: UTC+01:00 (CET)
  - Summer (DST): UTC+02:00 (CEST)
- INSEE/Postal code: 31272 /31310
- ^{1} French Land Register data, which excludes lakes, ponds, glaciers > 1 km^{2} (0.386 sq mi or 247 acres) and river estuaries.

Lapeyrère (French pronunciation: [lapeʁɛʁ]; Occitan: La Peirèra) is a commune in the Haute-Garonne department in southwestern France.

== Geography ==
The commune is bordered by six other communes, three in Haute-Garonne, and three in Ariège: Bax to the north, Canens to the northeast, Latour to the west, and finally by the department of Ariège to the east, southeast, and south by the communes of Sainte-Suzanne, Sieuras, and Méras.

== Population ==
Historical population
Year	Pop.	±% p.a.
1968	68	—
1975	44	−6.03%
1982	40	−1.35%
1990	47	+2.04%
1999	61	+2.94%
2007	81	+3.61%
2012	73	−2.06%
2017	68	−1.41%
2023	58	−2.62%
Source: INSEE

== See also ==
- Communes of the Haute-Garonne department
