= Massabrac =

- Commune
- Location of Massabrac
- Location within France Location within Occitanie
- Coordinates: 43°13′32″N 1°22′21″E
- Country: France
- Region: Occitania
- Department: Haute-Garonne
- Arrondissement: Muret
- Canton: Auterive
- Intercommunality: Volvestre

Government
  - Mayor (2020–2026): Jean-Louis Gay
- Area^{1}: 4 km^{2} (1.5 sq mi)
- Elevation: 240 m (790 ft)
- Highest elevation: 315 m (1,033 ft)
- Lowest elevation: 217 m (712 ft)
- Population (2023): 132
  - Density: 33/km^{2} (85/sq mi)
- Time zone: UTC+01:00 (CET)
  - Summer (DST): UTC+02:00 (CEST)
- INSEE/Postal code: 31326 /31310
- ^{1} French Land Register data, which excludes lakes, ponds, glaciers > 1 km^{2} (0.386 sq mi or 247 acres) and river estuaries.

Massabrac (French pronunciation: [masabʁak]) is a commune in the Haute-Garonne department in southwestern France.

== Geography ==
The Lèze forms part of the commune's northeastern border.

The commune is bordered by four communes, two of them is in Haute-Garonne, and two in Ariège: Castagnac to the northwest, Canens to the east, and finally by the department of Ariège to the northeast and southeast by the communes of Saint-Ybars and Sainte-Suzanne.

== Population ==
Historical population
Year	Pop.	±% p.a.
1968	107	—
1975	93	−1.98%
1982	87	−0.95%
1990	78	−1.36%
1999	72	−0.89%
2007	74	+0.34%
2012	83	+2.32%
2017	89	+1.41%
2023	132	+6.79%
Source: INSEE

== See also ==
- Communes of the Haute-Garonne department
