= Latour, Haute-Garonne =

Latour
- Commune
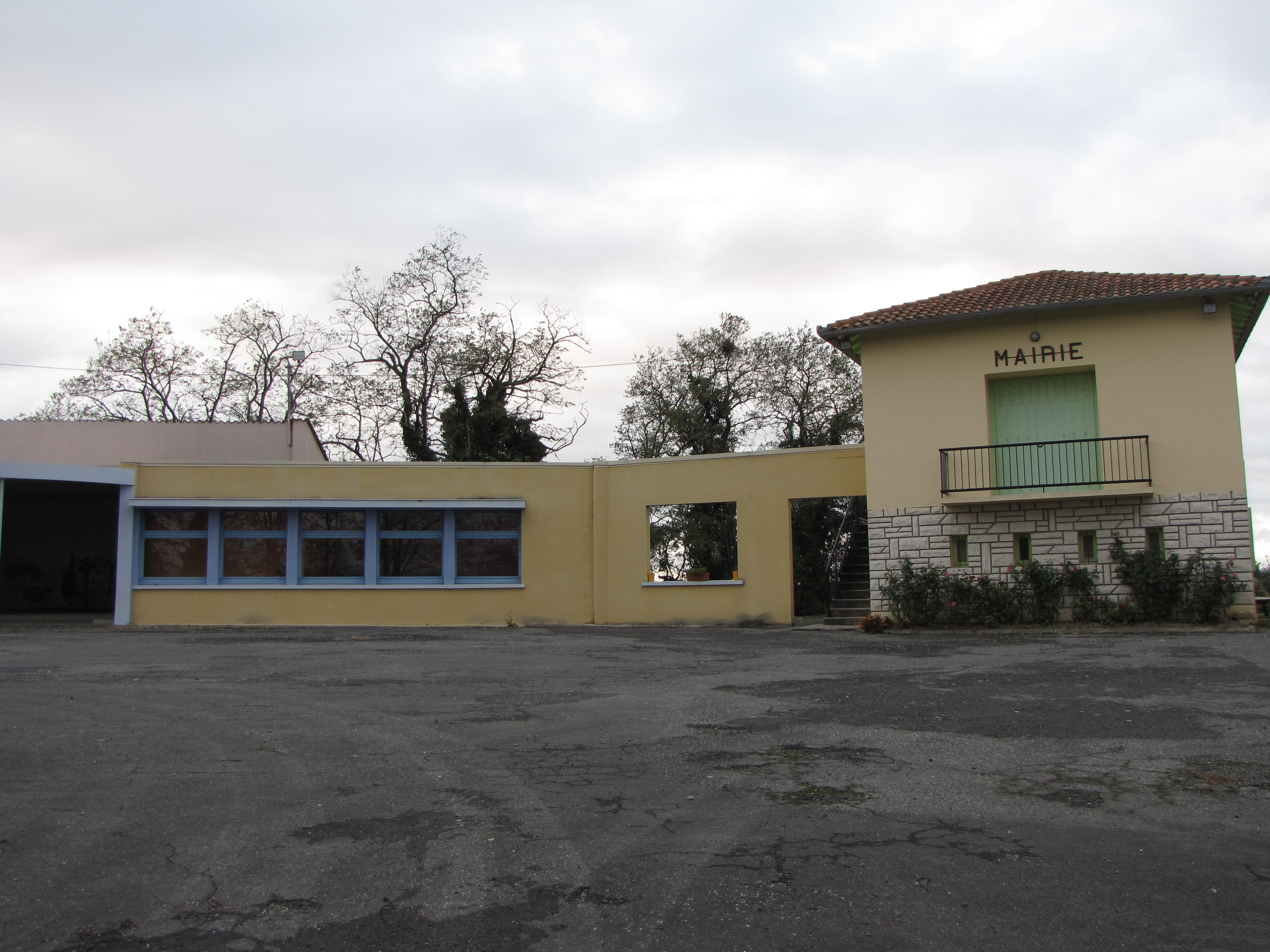
- Town hall

- Coat of arms
- Location of Latour
- Location within France Location within Occitanie
- Coordinates: 43°12′05″N 1°16′54″E
- Country: France
- Region: Occitania
- Department: Haute-Garonne
- Arrondissement: Muret
- Canton: Auterive
- Intercommunality: Volvestre

Government
  - Mayor (2023–2026): Émilie Mener
- Area^{1}: 6.24 km^{2} (2.41 sq mi)
- Elevation: 310 m (1,020 ft)
- Highest elevation: 383 m (1,257 ft)
- Lowest elevation: 242 m (794 ft)
- Population (2023): 80
  - Density: 13/km^{2} (33/sq mi)
- Time zone: UTC+01:00 (CET)
  - Summer (DST): UTC+02:00 (CEST)
- INSEE/Postal code: 31279 /31310
- ^{1} French Land Register data, which excludes lakes, ponds, glaciers > 1 km^{2} (0.386 sq mi or 247 acres) and river estuaries.

Latour (French pronunciation: [latuʁ]; Occitan: La Tor) is a commune in the Haute-Garonne department in southwestern France.

== Geography ==
The commune is bordered by five other communes, three of them is in Haute-Garonne, and two in Ariège: Bax to the north, Lapeyrère to the east, Montesquieu-Volvestre to the west, and finally by the department of Ariège to the southeast and south by the communes of Loubaut and Méras.

== Population ==
Historical population
Year	Pop.	±% p.a.
1968	112	—
1975	89	−3.23%
1982	77	−2.05%
1990	77	+0.00%
1999	103	+3.29%
2007	77	−3.57%
2012	77	+0.00%
2017	77	+0.00%
2023	80	+0.64%
Source: INSEE

== See also ==
- Communes of the Haute-Garonne department
