= Trigano =

Trigano is a surname. Notable people with the surname include:

- André Trigano (1925–2024), French businessman and politician
- Gilbert Trigano (1920–2001), French businessman
- Shmuel Trigano (born 1948), French sociologist and philosopher
