= La Bastide-de-Besplas =

Commune in Occitanie, France

- Commune
- Location of La Bastide-de-Besplas
- Location within France Location within Occitanie
- Coordinates: 43°10′03″N 1°16′32″E
- Country: France
- Region: Occitania
- Department: Ariège
- Arrondissement: Saint-Girons
- Canton: Arize-Lèze

Government
  - Mayor (2020–2026): Dominique Antolini
- Area^{1}: 10.22 km^{2} (3.95 sq mi)
- Elevation: 225 m (738 ft)
- Highest elevation: 391 m (1,283 ft)
- Lowest elevation: 234 m (768 ft)
- Population (2023): 383
  - Density: 37.5/km^{2} (97.1/sq mi)
- Time zone: UTC+01:00 (CET)
  - Summer (DST): UTC+02:00 (CEST)
- INSEE/Postal code: 09038 /09350
- ^{1} French Land Register data, which excludes lakes, ponds, glaciers > 1 km^{2} (0.386 sq mi or 247 acres) and river estuaries.

La Bastide-de-Besplas (Occitan: La Bastida) is a commune in the Ariège department in the Occitanie region of south-western France.

== Geography ==
La Bastide-de-Besplas is an old Bastide in the Massif de Plantaurel some 50 km south by south-west of Toulouse and 20 km west by north-west of Pamiers. Both the northern and southern borders of the commune are the departmental border with Haute-Garonne. Access to the commune is by the D628 from Montesquieu-Volvestre in the north-west which passes through the centre of the commune and the village and continues south-east to Daumazan-sur-Arize. The D326 branches off the D628 in the commune and goes north to join the D408 north of the commune. The commune is mostly farmland interspersed with some forest.

The Arize river flows through the centre of the commune and the village flowing from south-east to north-west where it continues to join the Garonne at Carbonne. The TaiVades stream rises in the north of the commune and flows north-west forming part of the northern border before joining the Arize on the commune border. The Ruisseau de Bergou forms the south-eastern border as it flows south-west to join the Arize. The Ruisseau d'Argain forms the southern border of the commune as it flows east to join the Arize in Daumazan-sur-Arize commune.

== History ==
La Bastide-de-Besplas appears as la Bafude de Besplas on the 1750 Cassini Map and as la Bailute on the 1790 version.

== Administration ==
List of Successive Mayors

From	To	Name
2001	2014	Jean-Pierre Bernabé
2014	2020	Nicolas Gareia
2020	2026	Dominique Antolini

== Demography ==
The inhabitants of the commune are known as Besplasois or Besplasoises in French.

Historical population

Year	Pop.	±% p.a.
1793	205	—
1821	674	+4.34%
1846	732	+0.33%
1872	724	−0.04%
1901	575	−0.79%
1926	527	−0.35%
1946	466	−0.61%
1962	468	+0.03%
1968	453	−0.54%

Year	Pop.	±% p.a.
1975	403	−1.66%
1982	307	−3.81%
1990	302	−0.21%
1999	294	−0.30%
2007	365	+2.74%
2012	390	+1.33%
2017	380	−0.52%
2023	383	+0.13%

Source: EHESS and INSEE

== Culture and heritage ==
=== Religious heritage ===
The Chapel of Notre-Dame-du-Bout-du-pont (1663) is registered as an historical monument.

The Chapel contains many items that are registered as historical objects:

- A Commemorative plaque (1728)
- A Ceiling Mural (18th century)
- A Statue: Christ on the Cross (16th century)
- A Retable (17th century)

The Parish Church also contains many items that are registered as historical objects:

- A Painting: The beheading of Saint John the Baptist (17th century)
- A Bronze Bell (1410)
- A Statue: Saint Louis (18th century)
- A Statue: Virgin and child (17th century)
- A Statue: Saint John the Baptist (18th century)
- A Chalice (19th century)
- An Offering Cross (19th century)
- A Chalice (19th century)
- A Group Sculpture: Virgin of Pity (18th century)

== Notable people linked to the commune ==
- Louis Astre, French trade unionist, born in the commune, where his parents were teachers, and spent his early years there.
- Henri Cuq, French Politician
- Abbot Casy Rivière

== See also ==
- Communes of the Ariège department
