= 2024 French legislative election in Ariège =

Following the first round of the 2024 French legislative election on 30 June 2024, runoff elections in each constituency where no candidate received a vote share greater than 50 percent were scheduled for 7 July. Candidates permitted to stand in the runoff elections needed to either come in first or second place in the first round or achieve more than 12.5 percent of the votes of the entire electorate (as opposed to 12.5 percent of the vote share due to low turnout).

== Ariège ==
=== 1st constituency ===
Candidate	Party or alliance		Votes	%
Martine Froger	New Popular Front	Socialist Party	19,245	50.74
Jean-Marc Garnier	National Rally		15,049	39.67
Gisèle Lapeyre	Far-left	Lutte Ouvrière	2,756	7.27
Pascale Mascetti	Reconquête		881	2.32
Total			37,931	100.00
Valid votes			37,931	92.90
Invalid votes			969	2.37
Blank votes			1,930	4.73
Total votes			40,830	100.00
Registered voters/turnout			57,416	71.11

=== 2nd constituency ===
Candidate	Party or alliance		First round		Second round	
Candidate	Party or alliance		Votes	%	Votes	%
Laurent Panifous	New Popular Front	Socialist Party	19,911	48.25	23,608	57.07
Michèle Alozy	National Rally		16,678	40.41	17,760	42.93
Yann De Kerimel	Miscellaneous right	Independent	2,023	4.90		
Théodora Testard	Far-left	Lutte Ouvrière	1,852	4.49		
Alexandra Tarrieux-Antranikian	Reconquête		804	1.95		
Total			41,268	100.00	41,368	100.00
Valid votes			41,268	94.89	41,368	94.85
Invalid votes			751	1.73	767	1.76
Blank votes			1,470	3.38	1,477	3.39
Total votes			43,489	100.00	43,612	100.00
Registered voters/turnout			62,051	70.09	62,062	70.27
