= Les Bordes-sur-Arize =

Commune in Occitanie, France

- Commune
- Coat of arms
- Location of Les Bordes-sur-Arize
- Location within France Location within Occitanie
- Coordinates: 43°06′21″N 1°22′16″E
- Country: France
- Region: Occitania
- Department: Ariège
- Arrondissement: Saint-Girons
- Canton: Arize-Lèze
- Intercommunality: Arize Lèze

Government
  - Mayor (2020–2026): Frédéric Camps
- Area^{1}: 12.68 km^{2} (4.90 sq mi)
- Elevation: 260 m (850 ft)
- Highest elevation: 508 m (1,667 ft)
- Lowest elevation: 256 m (840 ft)
- Population (2023): 460
  - Density: 36/km^{2} (94/sq mi)
- Time zone: UTC+01:00 (CET)
  - Summer (DST): UTC+02:00 (CEST)
- INSEE/Postal code: 09061 /09350
- ^{1} French Land Register data, which excludes lakes, ponds, glaciers > 1 km^{2} (0.386 sq mi or 247 acres) and river estuaries.

Les Bordes-sur-Arize (French pronunciation: [le bɔʁd syʁ aʁiz], literally Les Bordes on Arize; Occitan: Las Bòrdas d'Arisa) is a commune in the Ariège department of southwestern France.

== Population ==
Historical population
Year	Pop.	±% p.a.
1968	406	—
1975	378	−1.02%
1982	386	+0.30%
1990	446	+1.82%
1999	513	+1.57%
2007	545	+0.76%
2012	525	−0.74%
2017	518	−0.27%
2023	460	−1.96%
Source: INSEE

Inhabitants of Les Bordes-sur-Arize are called Bordésiens in French.

== See also ==
- Communes of the Ariège department
