= Campagne-sur-Arize =

Commune in Occitanie, France

- Commune
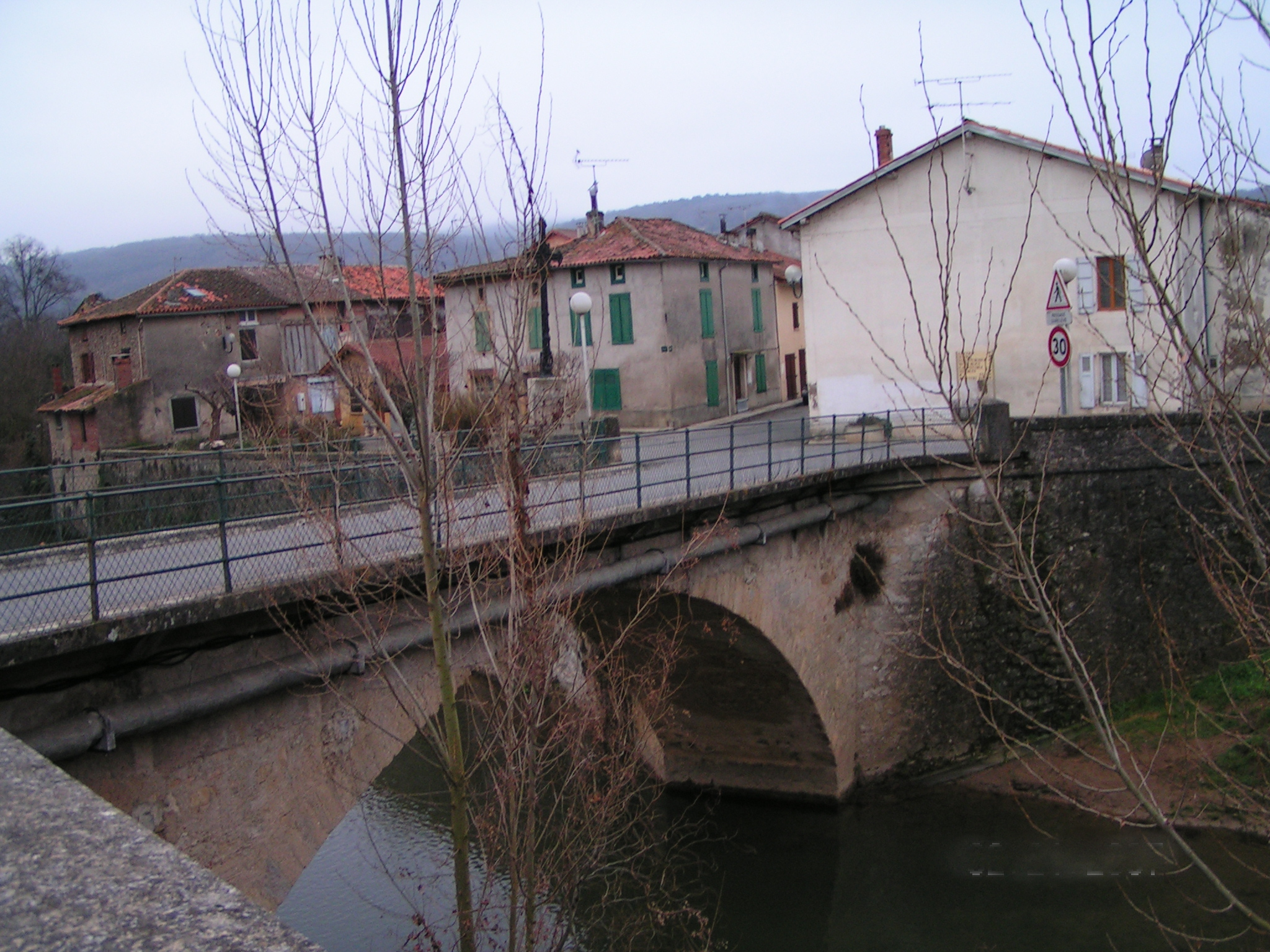
- The bridge in Campagne-sur-Arize
- Location of Campagne-sur-Arize
- Location within France Location within Occitanie
- Coordinates: 43°07′43″N 1°20′20″E
- Country: France
- Region: Occitania
- Department: Ariège
- Arrondissement: Saint-Girons
- Canton: Arize-Lèze

Government
  - Mayor (2020–2026): Jean-Claude Commenge
- Area^{1}: 13.34 km^{2} (5.15 sq mi)
- Elevation: 250 m (820 ft)
- Highest elevation: 482 m (1,581 ft)
- Lowest elevation: 251 m (823 ft)
- Population (2023): 300
  - Density: 22/km^{2} (58/sq mi)
- Time zone: UTC+01:00 (CET)
  - Summer (DST): UTC+02:00 (CEST)
- INSEE/Postal code: 09075 /09350
- ^{1} French Land Register data, which excludes lakes, ponds, glaciers > 1 km^{2} (0.386 sq mi or 247 acres) and river estuaries.

Campagne-sur-Arize (French pronunciation: [kɑ̃paɲ syʁ aʁiz], literally Campagne on Arize; Occitan: Campanha d'Arisa) is a commune in the Ariège department in southwestern France.

== Population ==
Historical population
Year	Pop.	±% p.a.
1968	326	—
1975	274	−2.45%
1982	258	−0.86%
1990	258	+0.00%
1999	281	+0.95%
2007	266	−0.68%
2012	265	−0.08%
2017	272	+0.52%
2023	300	+1.65%
Source: INSEE

== See also ==
- Communes of the Ariège department
