= Pailhès =

Pailhès may refer to the following places in France:

- Pailhès, Ariège, a commune in the Ariège department
- Pailhès, Hérault, a commune in the Hérault department
