= Montfa =

Montfa may refer to the following places in France:

- Montfa, Ariège, a commune in the Ariège department
- Montfa, Tarn, a commune in the Tarn department
