= Henri Nayrou =

French politician

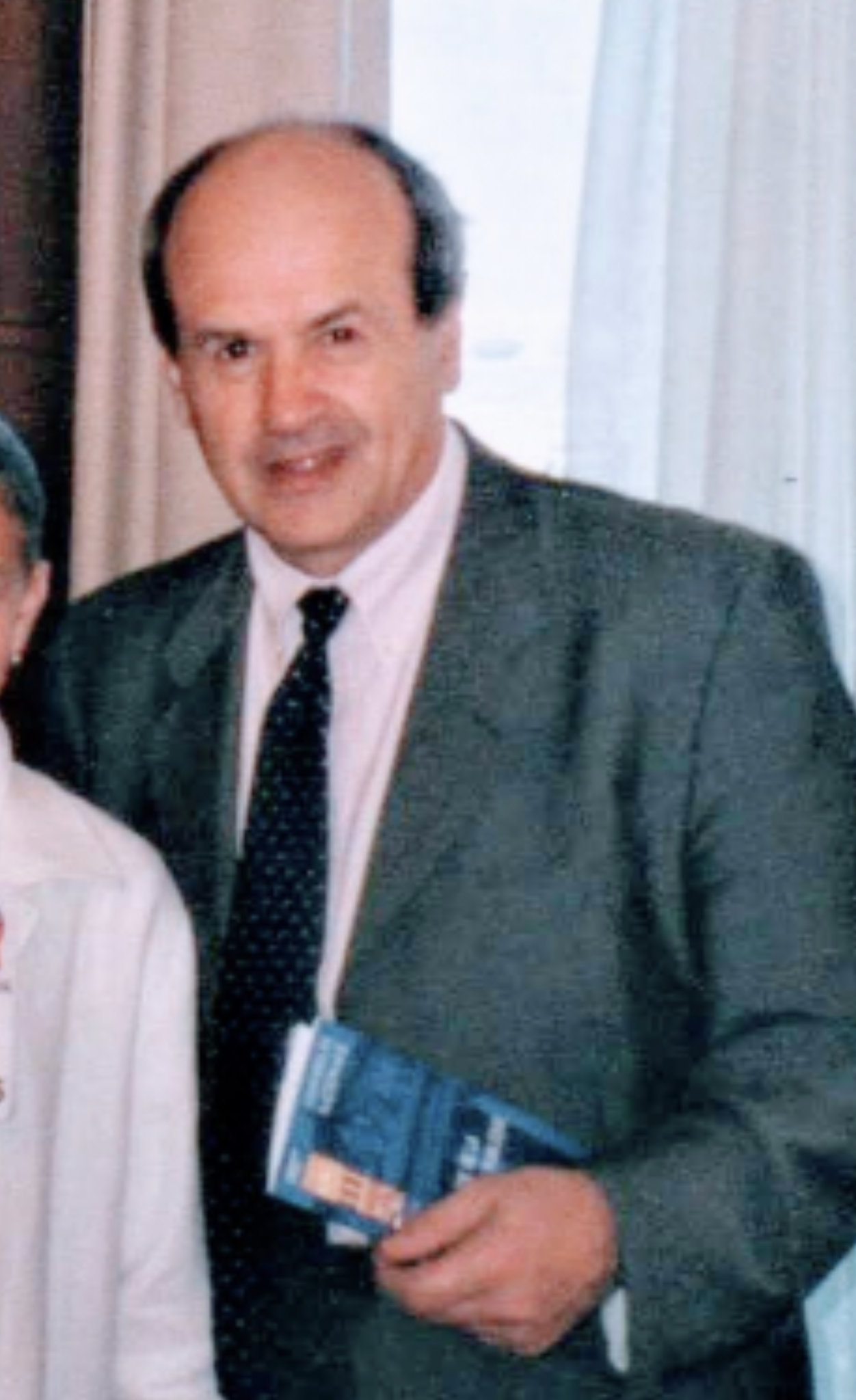
- Nayrou in 2005

deputy for Ariège's 2nd constituency in the National Assembly of France
- In office 1997–2012
- Preceded by: André Trigano
- Succeeded by: Alain Fauré

Personal details
- Born: 21 November 1944 (age 81) Suc-et-Sentenac, Ariège

Henri Nayrou (born 21 November 1944 in Suc-et-Sentenac, Ariège) is a French journalist and politician who has been president of the departmental council of Ariège since November 2014. A member of the French Socialist Party, he represented the 2nd constituency of Ariège in the National Assembly from 1997 to 2012.
