= Sabarat =

Commune in Occitanie, France

- Commune
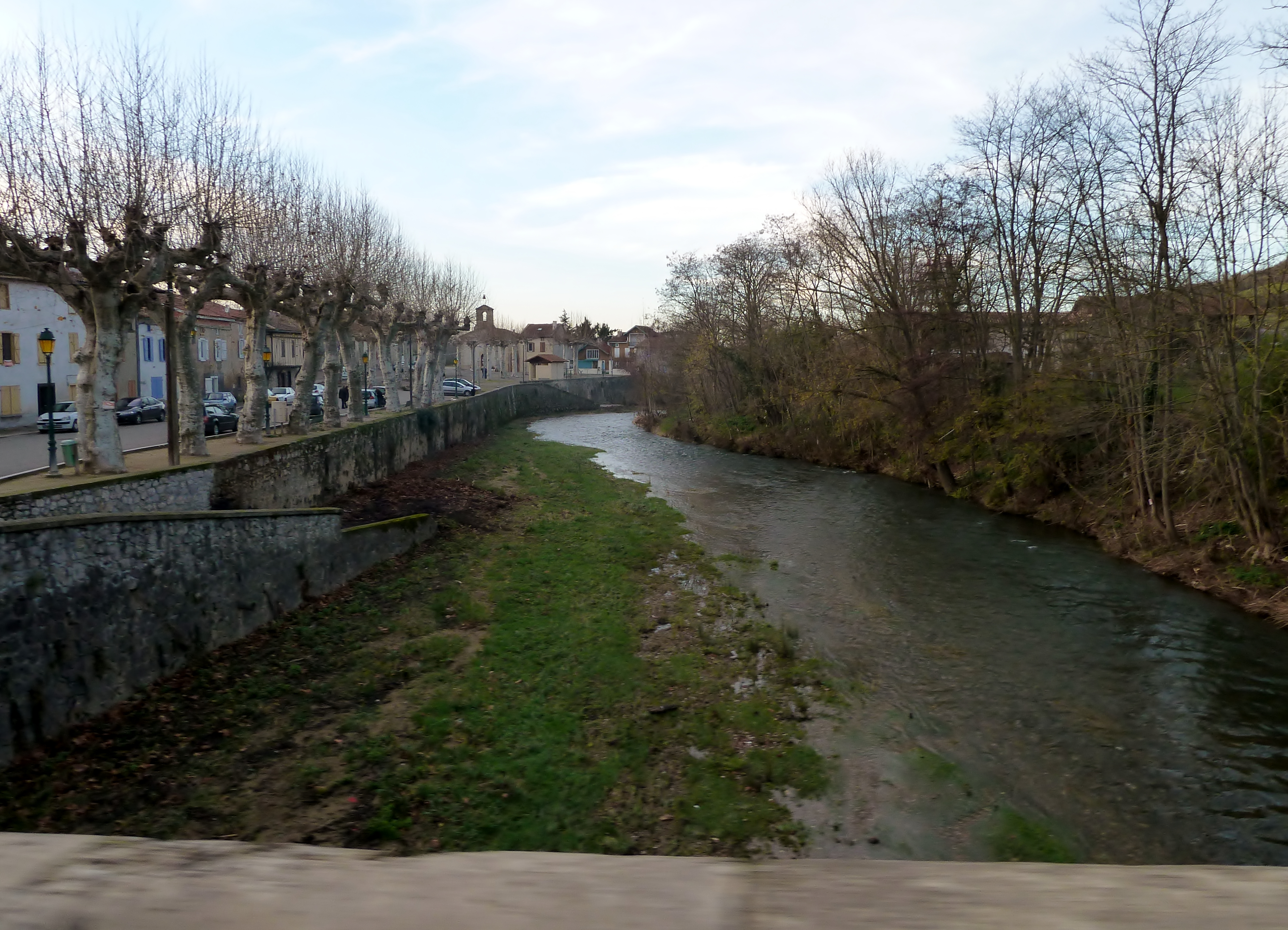
- The Arize at Sabarat

- Coat of arms
- Location of Sabarat
- Location within France Location within Occitanie
- Coordinates: 43°06′02″N 1°23′23″E
- Country: France
- Region: Occitania
- Department: Ariège
- Arrondissement: Saint-Girons
- Canton: Arize-Lèze
- Intercommunality: Arize Lèze

Government
  - Mayor (2020–2026): Laurent Milhorat
- Area^{1}: 9.5 km^{2} (3.7 sq mi)
- Elevation: 266 m (873 ft)
- Highest elevation: 510 m (1,670 ft)
- Lowest elevation: 265 m (869 ft)
- Population (2023): 361
  - Density: 38/km^{2} (98/sq mi)
- Time zone: UTC+01:00 (CET)
  - Summer (DST): UTC+02:00 (CEST)
- INSEE/Postal code: 09253 /09350
- ^{1} French Land Register data, which excludes lakes, ponds, glaciers > 1 km^{2} (0.386 sq mi or 247 acres) and river estuaries.

Sabarat (French pronunciation: [sabaʁat]; Occitan: Savarat) is a commune in the Ariège department in southwestern France.

It is located 23 km as the crow flies from Foix, the department's prefecture, 24 km from Saint-Girons, the sub-prefecture, and 20 km from Lézat-sur-Lèze, the central office of the canton of Arize-Lèze, to which the municipality has belonged since 2015 for departmental elections. The municipality is also part of the Pamiers catchment area.

The nearest municipalitie are: Les Bordes-sur-Arize (1.6 km), Le Mas-d'Azil (3.1 km), Castéras (3.4 km), Gabre (3.6 km), Lanoux (3.7 km), Pailhès (4.4 km), Campagne-sur-Arize (5.2 km), and Carla-Bayle (5.7 km).

Historically and culturally, Sabarat is part of Pédaguès, or Podaguès, a former name replaced in the 21st century by the geographical name Terrefort ariégeois, consisting of the terreforts of Pamiers and Saverdun, on the left bank of the Ariège.

Sabarat borders six other municipalities. The neighboring municipalities are Les Bordes-sur-Arize, Castéras, Gabre, Lanoux, Le Mas-d'Azil, and Pailhès.

== Population ==
Inhabitants are called Sabaratois in French.

Historical population
| Year | Pop. | ±% p.a. |
|---|---|---|
| 1968 | 327 | — |
| 1975 | 305 | −0.99% |
| 1982 | 279 | −1.26% |
| 1990 | 304 | +1.08% |
| 1999 | 284 | −0.75% |
| 2007 | 344 | +2.42% |
| 2012 | 340 | −0.23% |
| 2017 | 361 | +1.21% |
| 2023 | 361 | +0.00% |
Source: INSEE

== See also ==
- Communes of the Ariège department
