= Castéras =

Commune in Occitanie, France

- Commune
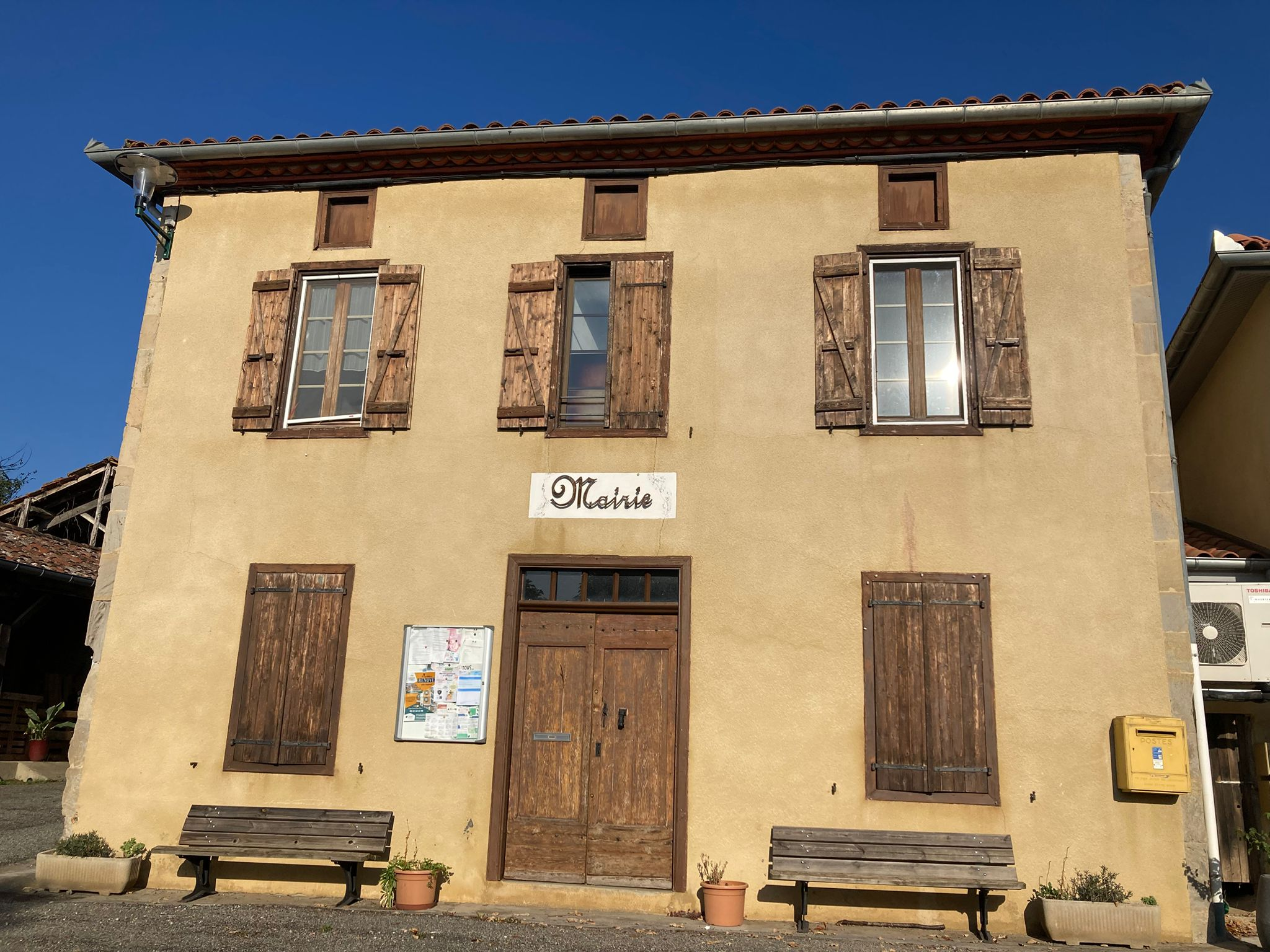
- Castéras Town hall
- Location of Castéras
- Location within France Location within Occitanie
- Coordinates: 43°07′47″N 1°24′03″E
- Country: France
- Region: Occitania
- Department: Ariège
- Arrondissement: Saint-Girons
- Canton: Arize-Lèze

Government
  - Mayor (2020–2026): Rosine Moreaud
- Area^{1}: 1.84 km^{2} (0.71 sq mi)
- Elevation: 300 m (980 ft)
- Highest elevation: 404 m (1,325 ft)
- Lowest elevation: 308 m (1,010 ft)
- Population (2023): 23
  - Density: 13/km^{2} (32/sq mi)
- Time zone: UTC+01:00 (CET)
  - Summer (DST): UTC+02:00 (CEST)
- INSEE/Postal code: 09083 /09130
- ^{1} French Land Register data, which excludes lakes, ponds, glaciers > 1 km^{2} (0.386 sq mi or 247 acres) and river estuaries.

Castéras is a commune in the Ariège department in southwestern France.

== Population ==
Historical population
Year	Pop.	±% p.a.
1968	37	—
1975	35	−0.79%
1982	28	−3.14%
1990	22	−2.97%
1999	30	+3.51%
2007	31	+0.41%
2012	31	+0.00%
2017	24	−4.99%
2023	23	−0.71%
Source: INSEE

== See also ==
- Communes of the Ariège department
