= Camarade =

Commune in Occitanie, France

- Commune
- Location of Camarade
- Location within France Location within Occitanie
- Coordinates: 43°05′12″N 1°17′11″E
- Country: France
- Region: Occitania
- Department: Ariège
- Arrondissement: Saint-Girons
- Canton: Arize-Lèze

Government
  - Mayor (2020–2026): Jean-Marc Bazy
- Area^{1}: 27.68 km^{2} (10.69 sq mi)
- Elevation: 450 m (1,480 ft)
- Highest elevation: 751 m (2,464 ft)
- Lowest elevation: 367 m (1,204 ft)
- Population (2023): 211
  - Density: 7.62/km^{2} (19.7/sq mi)
- Time zone: UTC+01:00 (CET)
  - Summer (DST): UTC+02:00 (CEST)
- INSEE/Postal code: 09073 /09290
- ^{1} French Land Register data, which excludes lakes, ponds, glaciers > 1 km^{2} (0.386 sq mi or 247 acres) and river estuaries.

Camarade (French pronunciation: [kamaʁad]; Occitan: Camarada) is a commune in the Ariège department of southwestern France.

== Population ==
Historical population
Year	Pop.	±% p.a.
1968	226	—
1975	195	−2.09%
1982	178	−1.29%
1990	158	−1.48%
1999	157	−0.07%
2007	145	−0.99%
2012	184	+4.88%
2017	182	−0.22%
2023	211	+2.49%
Source: INSEE

== See also ==
- Communes of the Ariège department
