= Castex, Ariège =

Commune in Occitanie, France

Castex
- Commune
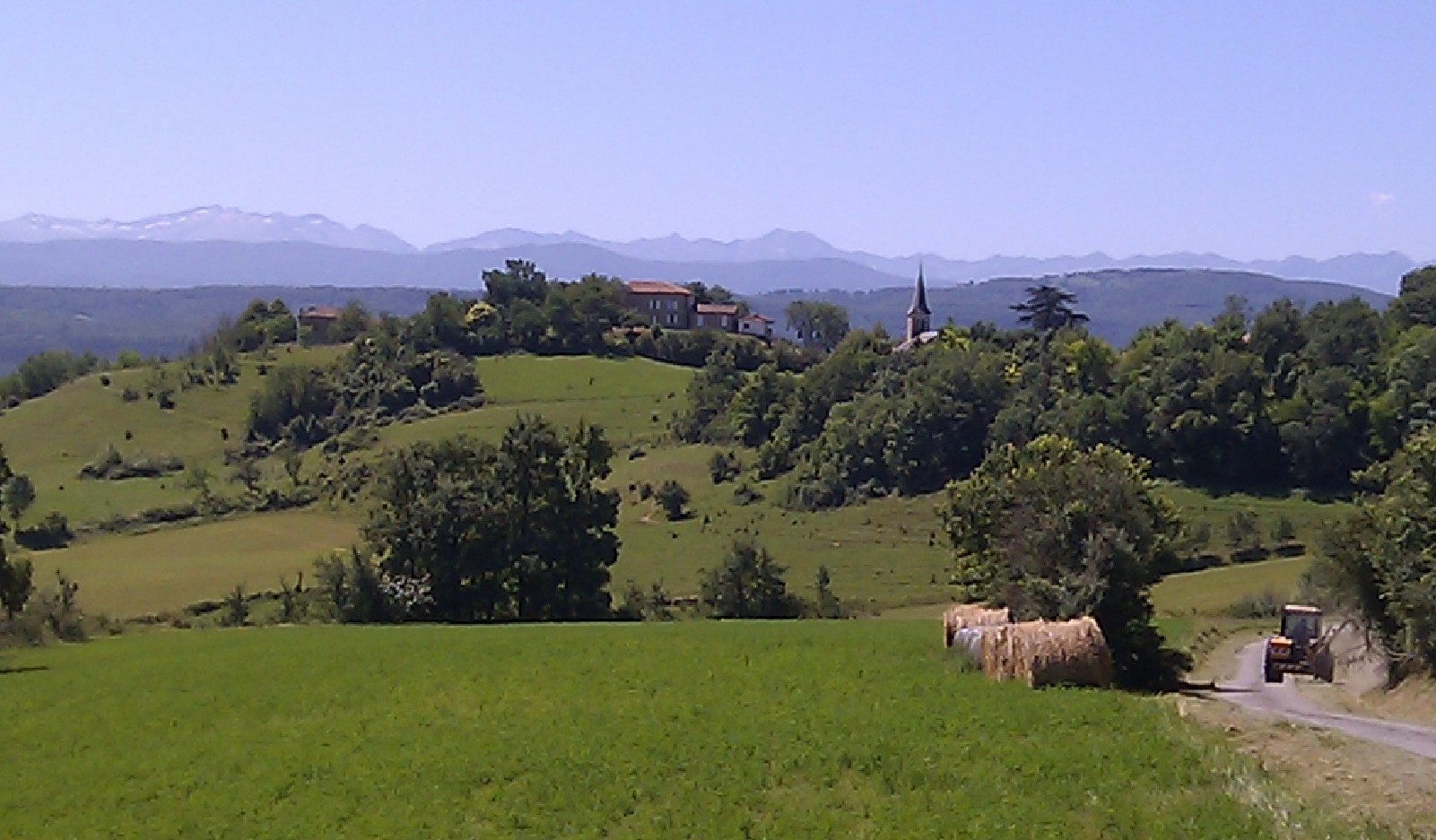
- A general view of Castex
- Location of Castex
- Location within France Location within Occitanie
- Coordinates: 43°10′02″N 1°18′48″E
- Country: France
- Region: Occitania
- Department: Ariège
- Arrondissement: Saint-Girons
- Canton: Arize-Lèze

Government
  - Mayor (2020–2026): Anne Courtial
- Area^{1}: 7.03 km^{2} (2.71 sq mi)
- Elevation: 375 m (1,230 ft)
- Highest elevation: 394 m (1,293 ft)
- Lowest elevation: 248 m (814 ft)
- Population (2023): 99
  - Density: 14/km^{2} (36/sq mi)
- Time zone: UTC+01:00 (CET)
  - Summer (DST): UTC+02:00 (CEST)
- INSEE/Postal code: 09084 /09350
- ^{1} French Land Register data, which excludes lakes, ponds, glaciers > 1 km^{2} (0.386 sq mi or 247 acres) and river estuaries.

Castex is a commune in the Ariège department of southwestern France.

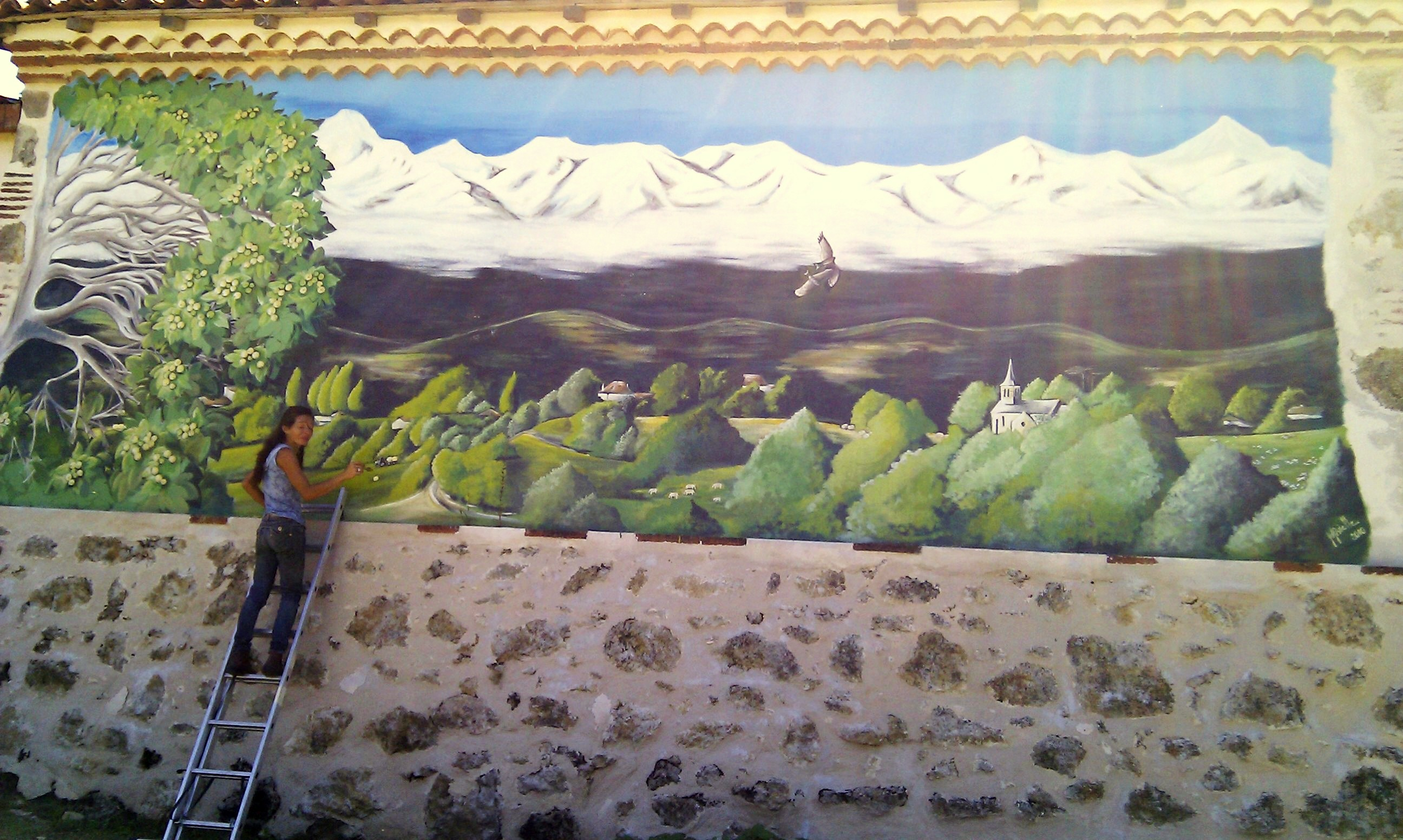
Panorama of Castex (by Mireille)

== Population ==
Its inhabitants are called Castetois in French.

Historical population
Year	Pop.	±% p.a.
1968	108	—
1975	98	−1.38%
1982	97	−0.15%
1990	76	−3.00%
1999	73	−0.45%
2007	93	+3.07%
2012	97	+0.85%
2017	94	−0.63%
2023	99	+0.87%
Source: INSEE

== See also ==
- Communes of the Ariège department
