= Michel Larive =

French politician

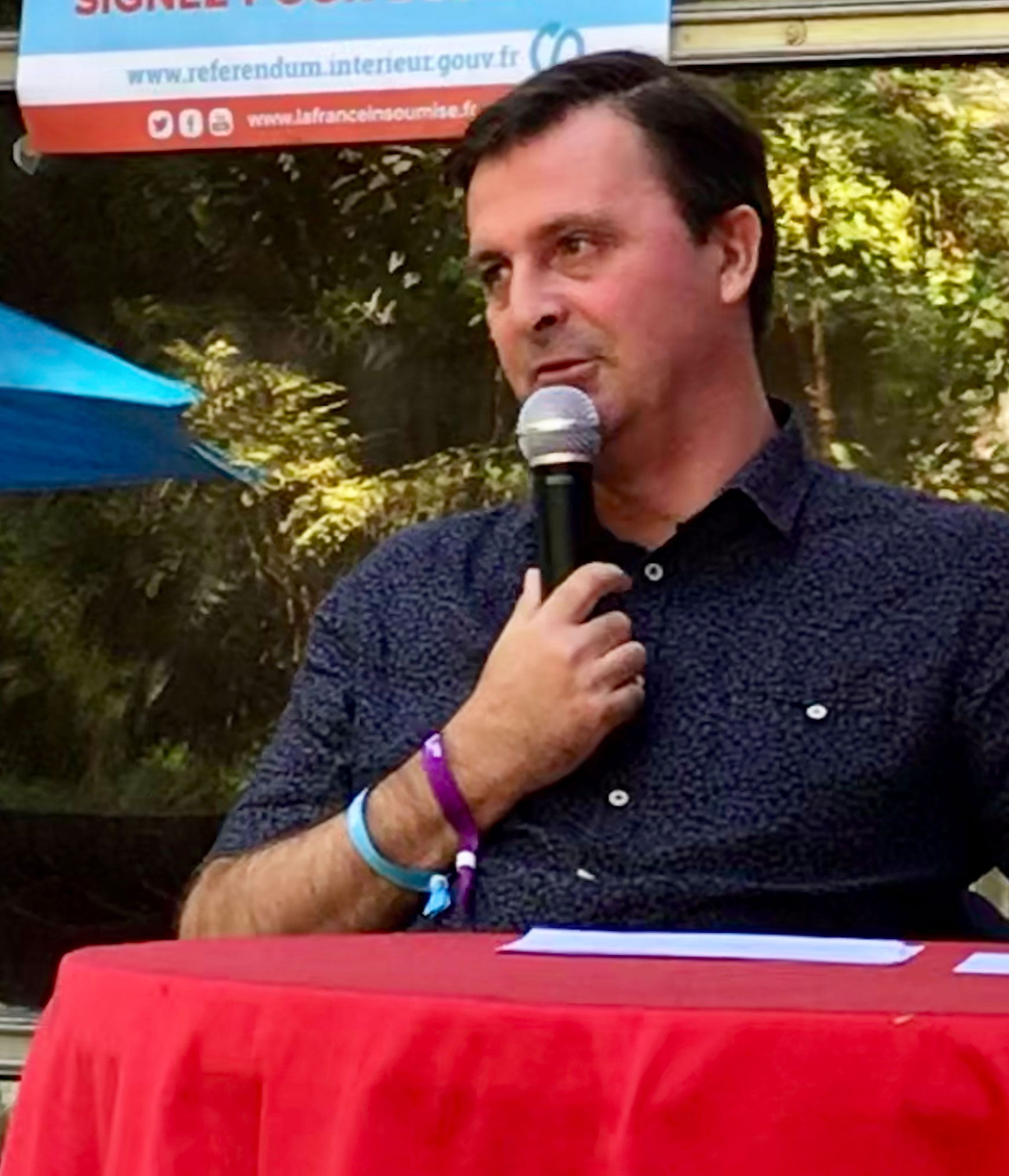
- Michel Larive in 2019

Member of the National Assembly for Ariège's 2nd constituency
- In office 21 June 2017 – 21 June 2022
- Preceded by: Alain Fauré
- Succeeded by: Laurent Panifous

Personal details
- Born: 22 August 1966 (age 59) Paris, France
- Party: La France Insoumise

Michel Larive (born 22 August 1966) is a French politician representing la France Insoumise. He was deputy for Ariège's 2nd constituency from 2017 to 2022.

In the 2022 French legislative election, he was the only La France Insoumise MP to lose his seat. He lost it to dissident candidate Socialist Party candidate Laurent Panifous.

== Biography ==
Michel Larive was born on August 22, 1966, in Paris. He is originally from Ercé, in Ariège. Michel Larive is a trainer who works in integration organizations and teaches mathematics on a freelance basis. He is also president of the Théâtrales en Couserans festival and co-founded the Agency for the Development of the Cultural Economy in Couserans.

At the age of eighteen, Michel Larive joined The Greens (France). He ran for office for the first time in the 1995 municipal elections in Saint-Girons, Ariège. Running as a candidate for the alternative left, he was not elected. He then ran as an independent candidate in the 2001 cantonal elections, supported by Les Verts, and participated in the “no” campaign in the 2005 European referendum. Critical of “green capitalism,” he left Les Verts and joined the Left Party, founding a local branch in Ariège.

In the 2008 municipal elections, he was elected to the Arrout municipal council. He was not re-elected in the 2014 elections. In the 2012 legislative elections in Ariège, he ran as a candidate in the first constituency of Ariège under the Front de gauche banner and obtained 10.88% of the votes in the first round. He was finally elected deputy for the second constituency of Ariège on June 18, 2017, with 50.56% of the votes in the second round under the political banner of La France Insoumise.

On September 20, 2017, François de Rugy, President of the National Assembly, announced his appointment as chair of one of the working groups tasked with reforming the National Assembly. His working group is called “Working Conditions at the National Assembly and Status of Parliamentary Staff,” where he oversees the participation of 10 members of parliament from all political parties. On March 6, 2019, he was elected president of the Association of Deputies-Employers (ADE), whose purpose is to negotiate and conclude collective labor agreements between deputies and staff members.

In early 2019, he drafted a bill to establish a fund to support artistic creation.

In May 2022, he was nominated by La France Insoumise for the Nouvelle Union populaire écologique et sociale coalition in the second constituency of Ariège. He was defeated in the second round by socialist dissident Laurent Panifous.

== See also ==
- 2017 French legislative election
