= Canens =

Canens may refer to:

- Canens (mythology), in Roman mythology, the personification of song, a nymph from Latium
- Canens, Haute-Garonne, a commune in France
