= Canton of Arize-Lèze =

Coordinates: 43.28°N 1.35°E

- Canton
- Situation of the canton of Arize-Lèze in the department of Ariège
- Country: France
- Region: Occitania
- Department: Ariège
- No. of communes: {{{nbcomm}}}
- Population (2023): 11,057
- INSEE code: 0902

The canton of Arize-Lèze is an administrative division of the Ariège department, southern France. It was created at the French canton reorganisation which came into effect in March 2015. Its seat is in Lézat-sur-Lèze.

It consists of the following communes:

1. Artigat
2. La Bastide-de-Besplas
3. Les Bordes-sur-Arize
4. Camarade
5. Campagne-sur-Arize
6. Carla-Bayle
7. Castéras
8. Castex
9. Daumazan-sur-Arize
10. Durfort
11. Fornex
12. Le Fossat
13. Gabre
14. Lanoux
15. Lézat-sur-Lèze
16. Loubaut
17. Le Mas-d'Azil
18. Méras
19. Monesple
20. Montfa
21. Pailhès
22. Sabarat
23. Sainte-Suzanne
24. Saint-Ybars
25. Sieuras
26. Thouars-sur-Arize
27. Villeneuve-du-Latou
