= Fornex =

Commune in Occitanie, France

- Commune
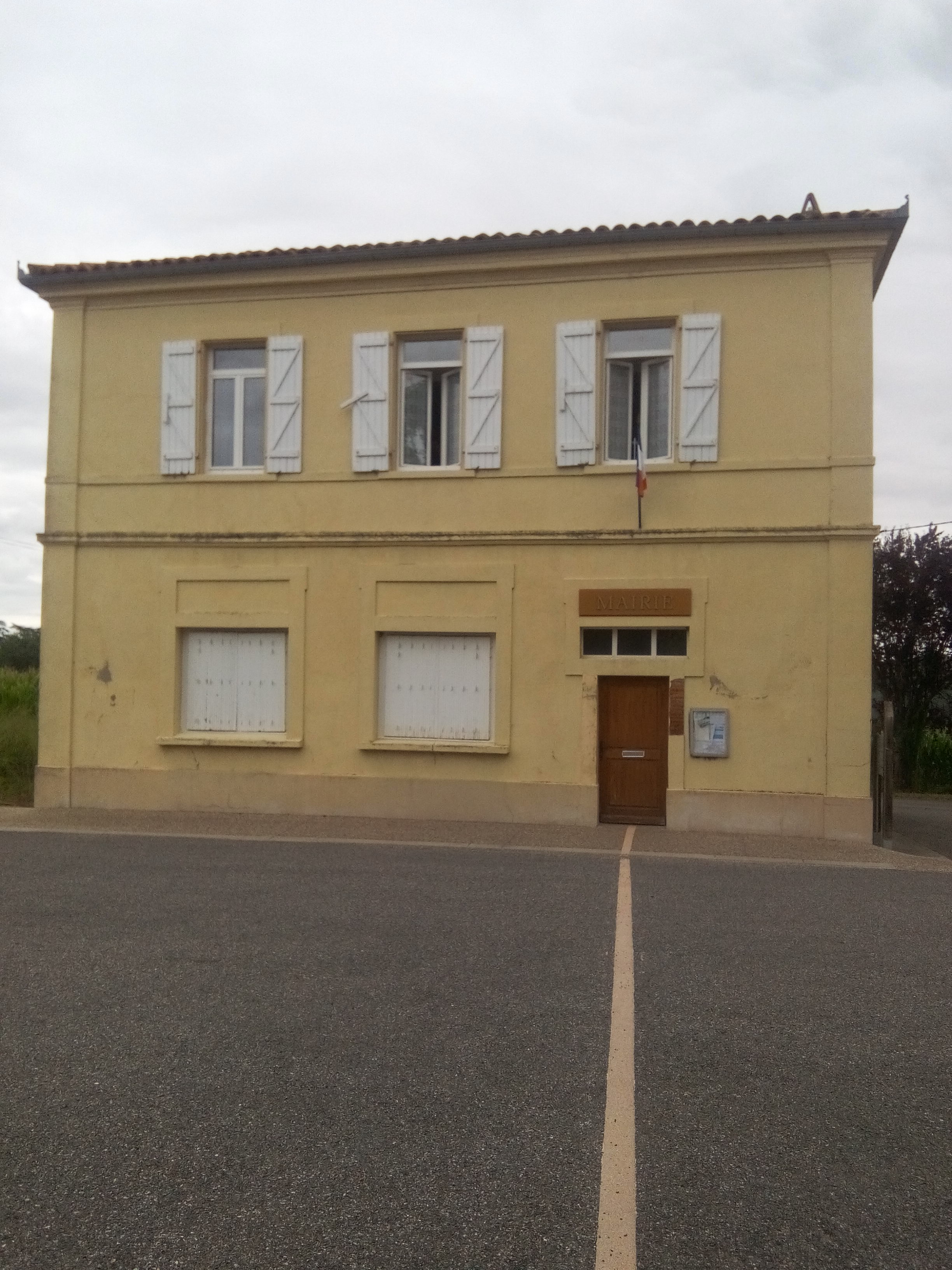
- Town hall
- Location of Fornex
- Location within France Location within Occitanie
- Coordinates: 43°10′04″N 1°14′54″E
- Country: France
- Region: Occitania
- Department: Ariège
- Arrondissement: Saint-Girons
- Canton: Arize-Lèze

Government
  - Mayor (2020–2026): Philippe Busato
- Area^{1}: 9.62 km^{2} (3.71 sq mi)
- Elevation: 250 m (820 ft)
- Highest elevation: 422 m (1,385 ft)
- Lowest elevation: 233 m (764 ft)
- Population (2023): 104
  - Density: 10.8/km^{2} (28.0/sq mi)
- Time zone: UTC+01:00 (CET)
  - Summer (DST): UTC+02:00 (CEST)
- INSEE/Postal code: 09123 /09350
- ^{1} French Land Register data, which excludes lakes, ponds, glaciers > 1 km^{2} (0.386 sq mi or 247 acres) and river estuaries.

Fornex is a commune in the Ariège department in southwestern France.

== Population ==
Historical population
Year	Pop.	±% p.a.
1968	146	—
1975	120	−2.76%
1982	121	+0.12%
1990	126	+0.51%
1999	126	+0.00%
2007	107	−2.02%
2012	114	+1.28%
2017	113	−0.18%
2023	104	−1.37%
Source: INSEE

== See also ==
- Communes of the Ariège department
