= Daumazan-sur-Arize =

Commune in Occitanie, France

- Commune
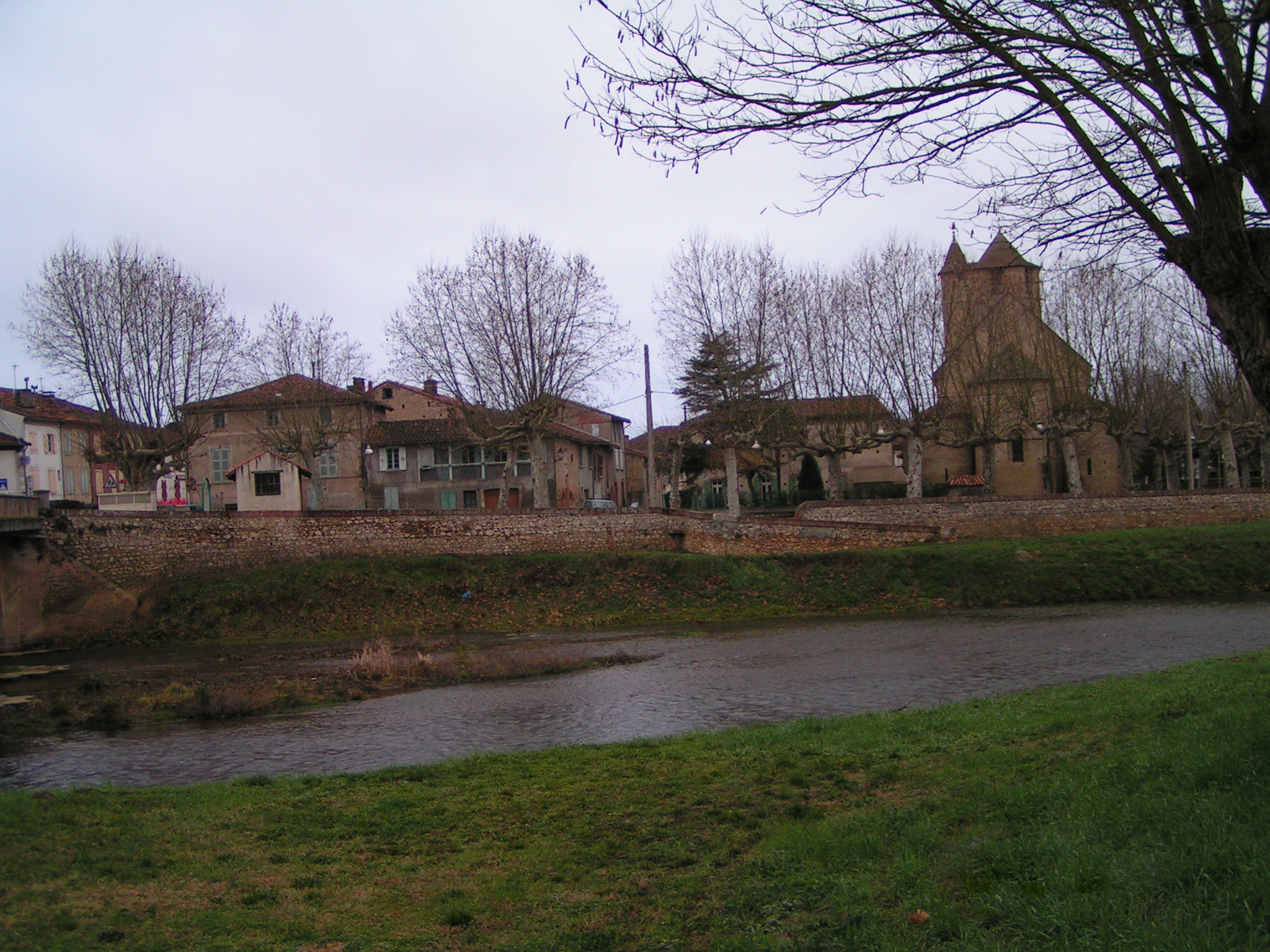
- A general view of Daumazan-sur-Arize

- Coat of arms
- Location of Daumazan-sur-Arize
- Location within France Location within Occitanie
- Coordinates: 43°08′41″N 1°18′30″E
- Country: France
- Region: Occitania
- Department: Ariège
- Arrondissement: Saint-Girons
- Canton: Arize-Lèze

Government
  - Mayor (2023–2026): Carole Maurette
- Area^{1}: 13.78 km^{2} (5.32 sq mi)
- Elevation: 245 m (804 ft)
- Highest elevation: 361 m (1,184 ft)
- Lowest elevation: 239 m (784 ft)
- Population (2023): 804
  - Density: 58.3/km^{2} (151/sq mi)
- Time zone: UTC+01:00 (CET)
  - Summer (DST): UTC+02:00 (CEST)
- INSEE/Postal code: 09105 /09350
- ^{1} French Land Register data, which excludes lakes, ponds, glaciers > 1 km^{2} (0.386 sq mi or 247 acres) and river estuaries.

Daumazan-sur-Arize (French pronunciation: [domazɑ̃ syʁ aʁiz], literally Daumazan on Arize; Occitan: Daumasan) is a commune in the Ariège department in southwestern France.

== Population ==
Historical population
Year	Pop.	±% p.a.
1968	620	—
1975	599	−0.49%
1982	605	+0.14%
1990	617	+0.25%
1999	657	+0.70%
2007	706	+0.90%
2012	714	+0.23%
2017	719	+0.14%
2023	804	+1.88%
Source: INSEE

== See also ==
- Communes of the Ariège department
