= Durfort, Ariège =

Commune in Occitanie, France

Durfort
- Commune
- Coat of arms
- Location of Durfort
- Location within France Location within Occitanie
- Coordinates: 43°12′26″N 1°27′28″E
- Country: France
- Region: Occitania
- Department: Ariège
- Arrondissement: Saint-Girons
- Canton: Arize-Lèze

Government
  - Mayor (2020–2026): Roger Buffa
- Area^{1}: 10.98 km^{2} (4.24 sq mi)
- Elevation: 346 m (1,135 ft)
- Highest elevation: 372 m (1,220 ft)
- Lowest elevation: 245 m (804 ft)
- Population (2023): 185
  - Density: 16.8/km^{2} (43.6/sq mi)
- Time zone: UTC+01:00 (CET)
  - Summer (DST): UTC+02:00 (CEST)
- INSEE/Postal code: 09109 /09130
- ^{1} French Land Register data, which excludes lakes, ponds, glaciers > 1 km^{2} (0.386 sq mi or 247 acres) and river estuaries.

Durfort (French pronunciation: [dyʁfɔʁ]; Languedocien: Durfòrt) is a commune in the Ariège department in southwestern France.

== Population ==
Historical population
| Year | Pop. | ±% p.a. |
|---|---|---|
| 1968 | 167 | — |
| 1975 | 116 | −5.07% |
| 1982 | 120 | +0.49% |
| 1990 | 111 | −0.97% |
| 1999 | 126 | +1.42% |
| 2007 | 178 | +4.41% |
| 2012 | 159 | −2.23% |
| 2017 | 146 | −1.69% |
| 2023 | 185 | +4.02% |
Source: INSEE

== See also ==
- Communes of the Ariège department
