= Pailhès, Ariège =

Commune in Occitanie, France

Pailhès
- Commune
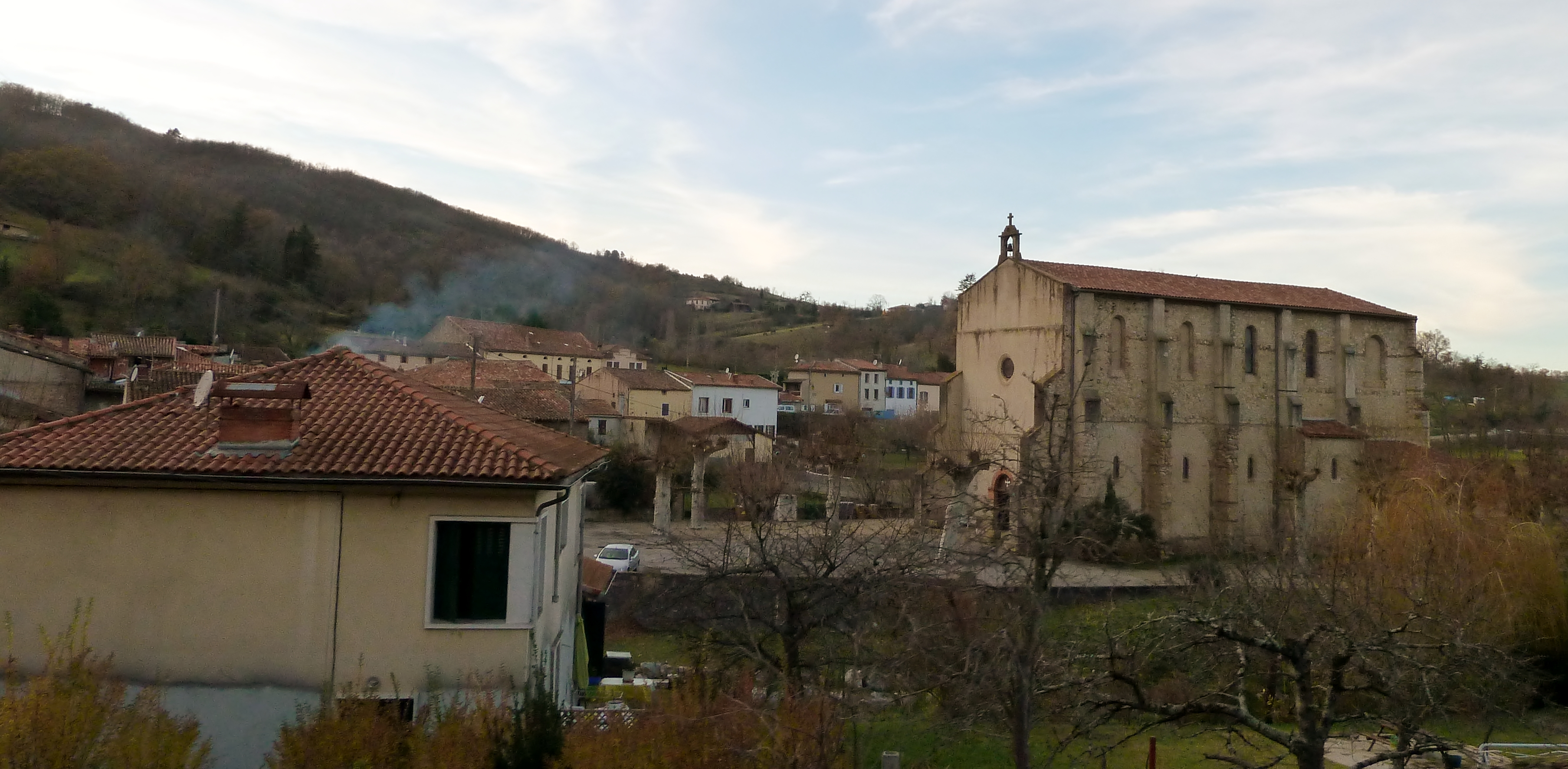
- A view of Pailhès
- Location of Pailhès
- Location within France Location within Occitanie
- Coordinates: 43°06′11″N 1°26′36″E
- Country: France
- Region: Occitania
- Department: Ariège
- Arrondissement: Saint-Girons
- Canton: Arize-Lèze

Government
  - Mayor (2020–2026): Yvon Lassalle
- Area^{1}: 21.52 km^{2} (8.31 sq mi)
- Elevation: 287 m (942 ft)
- Highest elevation: 532 m (1,745 ft)
- Lowest elevation: 267 m (876 ft)
- Population (2023): 511
  - Density: 23.7/km^{2} (61.5/sq mi)
- Time zone: UTC+01:00 (CET)
  - Summer (DST): UTC+02:00 (CEST)
- INSEE/Postal code: 09224 /09130
- ^{1} French Land Register data, which excludes lakes, ponds, glaciers > 1 km^{2} (0.386 sq mi or 247 acres) and river estuaries.

Pailhès (French pronunciation: [pajɛs]; Occitan: Palhèrs) is a commune located in the department of Ariège in Midi-Pyrenees in southwestern France. Its inhabitants are called Pailhésiens and Pailhésiennes.

== Geography ==
This commune is located in the mountains of Plantaurel on the river Lèze and on the old national road 628 between Saint-Jean-de-Verges and Campagne-sur-Arize. It is part of the Regional Park of the Ariège Pyrenees. The Lèze flows northwest through the southeastern part of the commune, crosses the village, then flows north through the middle of the commune.

== History ==
It is one of the villages that provide a bridge over the river Lèze. As such it was of military significance in the Middle Ages, which resulted in the Chateau of Pailhes being built on the hill overlooking the river. The chateau was built in the 12th century by the Comte de Foix and reached a high point when King Henri II of France stayed the night there. Many of the present day villagers now claim royal descent as a result of this visit.

Special note: Until the Revolution, the barony of Pailhes played an important role in the region. With some neighboring parishes, it formed an enclave of Languedoc in the County of Foix. With its neighboring parishes, Pailhes was part of the Episcopal Diocese of Rieux and civil diocese of Toulouse. See Cassini maps and Histariège site.

The ancient village can still be seen at the foot of the chateau while the more modern buildings are across the river.

The chateau has recently been purchased by the local historical society who are in the process of renovating it.

== Transport ==
Pailhès was on the metre-gauge railway which ran from Toulouse along the valley of the Lèze, and continued to Sabarat. The railway was in operation between 1910 and 1938. After 1938, the railway line was torn up, though the former stations can still be seen in each of the villages of the Lèze.

== Population ==
Inhabitants of Pailhès are called Pailhésiens in French.

Historical population
Year	Pop.	±% p.a.
1968	365	—
1975	322	−1.77%
1982	307	−0.68%
1990	281	−1.10%
1999	297	+0.62%
2007	380	+3.13%
2012	411	+1.58%
2017	472	+2.81%
2023	511	+1.33%
Source: INSEE

== See also ==
- Communes of the Ariège department
