= Laurent Panifous =

French politician (born 1976)

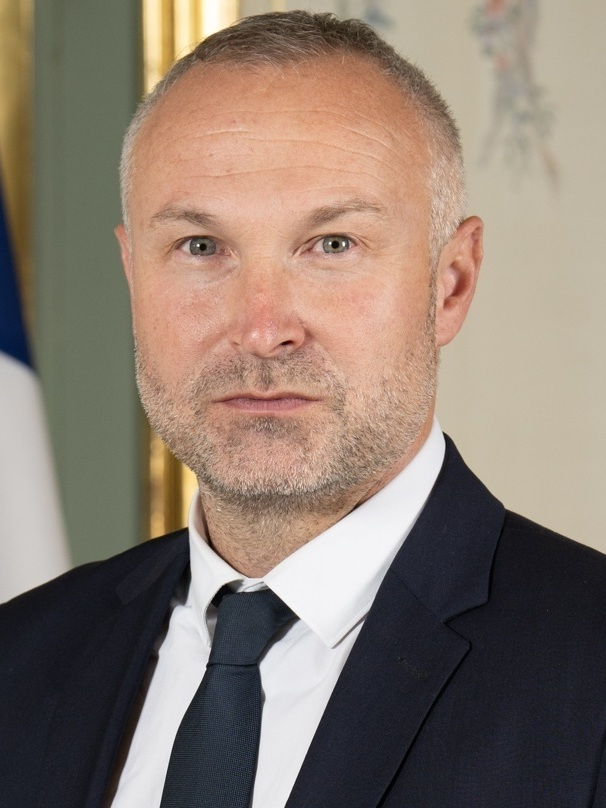
- Official portrait, 2025

Minister Delegate for Relations with Parliament
- Incumbent
- Assumed office 12 October 2025
- Prime Minister: Sébastien Lecornu
- Preceded by: Mathieu Lefèvre

President of the Liberties, Independents, Overseas and Territories group in the National Assembly
- Incumbent
- Assumed office 28 February 2025
- Preceded by: Stéphane Lenormand

Member of the National Assembly for Ariège's 2nd constituency
- Incumbent
- Assumed office 22 June 2022
- Preceded by: Michel Larive

Mayor of Le Fossat
- In office 30 March 2014 – 28 July 2022
- Preceded by: Bernard Campmas
- Succeeded by: Véronique Arnaud

Personal details
- Born: 21 December 1976 (age 49) Foix, Ariège, France
- Party: Socialist Party (until 2022)

Laurent Panifous (French pronunciation: [lɔʁɑ̃ panifus]; born 21 December 1976) is a French politician who has served as Minister Delegate for Relations with Parliament in the second government of Prime Minister Sébastien Lecornu since 12 October 2025.

A former member of the Socialist Party, Panifous was elected to the National Assembly for the 2nd constituency of the Ariège department in the 2022 legislative election. Earlier in 2025, he was elected president of the Liberties, Independents, Overseas and Territories group in the National Assembly.

== Early career ==
Panifous was the director of an établissement d'hébergement pour personnes âgées dépendantes (EHPAD), a residential aged care.

== Political career ==
Locally, Panifous was mayor of Le Fossat from 2014 to 2022 and president of the communauté de communes Arize-Lèze from 2017 to 2022.

In the 2022 legislative election, Panifous was elected to the National Assembly in the 2nd constituency of Ariège. A dissident of the Socialist Party, he benefited in the interval between the two rounds from the presidential majority's call to vote in his favour against Michel Larive, the outgoing deputy and the New Ecological and Social People's Union candidate, an alliance including the Socialist Party. He announced wanting to offer a "responsible opposition" to President Emmanuel Macron.

In early 2025, he was elected president of the Liberties, Independents, Overseas and Territories group in the National Assembly. Later in 2025, he was appointed Minister Delegate for Relations with Parliament upon Prime Minister Sébastien Lecornu's second government taking office.
