= Alain Fauré =

French politician (1962–2018)

Member of the National Assembly of France for Ariège's 2nd constituency
- In office 2012–2017
- Preceded by: Henri Nayrou
- Succeeded by: Michel Larive

Personal details
- Born: 1 October 1962
- Died: 12 July 2018 (aged 55)

Alain Fauré (1 October 1962 – 12 July 2018) was a French politician who served as a Deputy for Ariège's 2nd constituency in the National Assembly of France from 2012 to 2017 and as Mayor of Les Pujols from 2001 to 2014.

== See also ==
- List of deputies of the 14th National Assembly of France
