= Ariège's 2nd constituency =

Constituency of the National Assembly of France

2nd constituency of Ariège
- inline Constituency of the National Assembly of France

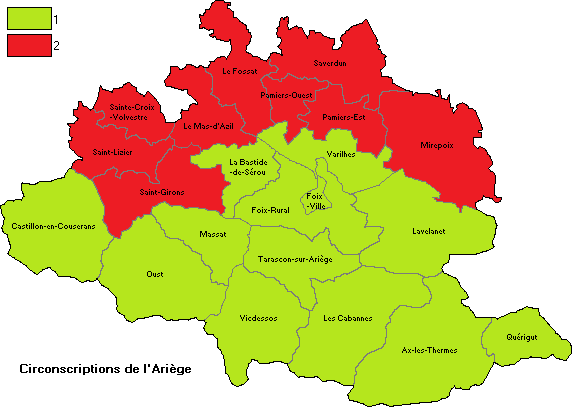
- The two constituencies of Ariège

- Ariège in France
- Deputy: Laurent Panifous; PS
- Department: Ariège
- Cantons: Le Fossat, Le Mas-d'Azil, Mirepoix, Pamiers-Est, Pamiers-Ouest, Sainte-Croix-Volvestre, Saint-Girons, Saint-Lizier, Saverdun
- Registered voters: 80,744

The 2nd constituency of Ariège is a French legislative constituency, covering the north of the Ariège département.

== Deputies ==
| Election | Member | Party |
|---|---|---|
| 1958 | René Dejean | SFIO |
| 1962 | René Dejean | SFIO |
| 1967 | René Dejean | FGDS |
| 1968 | André Saint-Paul | FGDS |
| 1973 | André Saint-Paul | PS |
| 1978 | André Saint-Paul | PS |
| 1981 | Jean Ibanès | PS |
| 1986 | Proportional representation - no election by constituency | |
| 1988 | René Massat | PS |
| 1993 | André Trigano | PRV |
| 1997 | Henri Nayrou | PS |
| 2002 | Henri Nayrou | PS |
| 2007 | Henri Nayrou | PS |
| 2012 | Alain Fauré | PS |
| 2017 | Michel Larive | LFI |
| 2022 | Laurent Panifous | PS/LIOT |
| 2024 | Laurent Panifous | PS |

== Election results ==
=== 2024 ===
| Candidate | Party | Alliance | First round | | Second round | |
| Candidate | Party | Alliance | Votes | % | Votes | % |
|---|---|---|---|---|---|---|
| Laurent Panifous | PS | diss. | 19,911 | 48.25 | 23,608 | 57.07 |
| Michèle Alozy | RN | | 16,678 | 40.41 | 17,760 | 42.93 |
| Yann De Kerimel | DVD | | 2,023 | 4.90 | | |
| Théodora Testard | LO | | 1,852 | 4.49 | | |
| Alexandra Tarrieux-Antranikian | REC | | 804 | 1.95 | | |
| Votes | | | 41,268 | 100 | 41,368 | 100 |
| Valid votes | | | 41,268 | 94.89 | 41,368 | 94.85 |
| Blank votes | | | 1,465 | 3.37 | 1,477 | 3.39 |
| Null votes | | | 756 | 1.74 | 767 | 1.76 |
| Turnout | | | 43,489 | 70.09 | 43,612 | 70.27 |
| Abstentions | | | 18,562 | 29.91 | 18,450 | 29.73 |
| Registered voters | | | 62,051 | | 62,062 | |
| Result | | | PS HOLD | | | |

Laurent Panifous is running for election as a dissident from PS, without the endorsement of NFP.

=== 2022 ===
Legislative Election 2022: Ariège's 2nd constituency
| Party | Candidate | Votes | % | ±% |
|---|---|---|---|---|
| LFI (NUPÉS) | Michel Larive | 9,424 | 29.05 | -13.25 |
| PS | Laurent Panifous* | 7,068 | 21.79 | N/A |
| RN | Bérengère Carrie | 6,686 | 20.61 | +6.84 |
| MoDem (Ensemble) | Rémi Dutrenois | 4,237 | 13.06 | −12.52 |
| REC | Alexandra Tarrieux-Antranikian | 1,271 | 3.92 | N/A |
| DIV | Yann De Kerimel | 928 | 2.86 | N/A |
| UDI (UDC) | Paul Afonso | 783 | 2.41 | N/A |
| REG | Enzo Garcia | 543 | 1.67 | N/A |
| Others | N/A | 1,174 | | |
| Turnout | | 33,366 | 53.80 | +0.07 |
2nd round result
| PS | Laurent Panifous* | 16,225 | 56.71 | N/A |
| LFI (NUPÉS) | Michel Larive | 12,383 | 43.29 | −7.26 |
| Turnout | | 28,608 | 51.11 | +4.00 |
| PS gain from LFI | | | | |

* PS dissident, not in accord with NUPES Source:

=== 2017 ===
| Candidate | Label | First round | | Second round | |
| Candidate | Label | Votes | % | Votes | % |
|---|---|---|---|---|---|
| Huguette Bertrand-Vinzérich | REM | 8,161 | 25.71 | 12,298 | 49.45 |
| Michel Larive | FI | 5,977 | 18.83 | 12,572 | 50.55 |
| Alain Fauré | PS | 5,602 | 17.65 | | |
| Philippe Calleja | LR | 4,636 | 14.61 | | |
| Bernard Gondran | FN | 4,437 | 13.98 | | |
| Jérôme Brosseron | ECO | 1,272 | 4.01 | | |
| Vincent Heredia | PCF | 671 | 2.11 | | |
| Bernadette Dedieu-Coumenay | UDI | 327 | 1.03 | | |
| Guy Djedaini | DLF | 259 | 0.82 | | |
| Berthe Ratsimba | EXG | 201 | 0.63 | | |
| Dominique Allemand | DIV | 194 | 0.61 | | |
| Votes | | 31,737 | 100.00 | 24,870 | 100.00 |
| Valid votes | | 31,737 | 97.31 | 24,870 | 87.02 |
| Blank votes | | 600 | 1.84 | 2,242 | 7.84 |
| Null votes | | 277 | 0.85 | 1,469 | 5.14 |
| Turnout | | 32,614 | 53.73 | 28,581 | 47.11 |
| Abstentions | | 28,084 | 46.27 | 32,091 | 52.89 |
| Registered voters | | 60,698 | | 60,672 | |
Source: Ministry of the Interior

=== 2012 ===
Summary of the 10 June and 17 June 2012 French legislative in Ariège’s 2nd Constituency election results
| Candidate | Party | | 1st round | | 2nd round | |
| Candidate | Party | | Votes | % | Votes | % |
|---|---|---|---|---|---|---|
| Alain Fauré | Socialist Party | PS | 16,193 | 44.53% | 22,587 | 67.03% |
| Philippe Calleja | Union for a Popular Movement | UMP | 8,569 | 23.56% | 11,108 | 32.97% |
| Thérèse Aliot | National Front | FN | 4,570 | 12.57% | | |
| Viviane Baudry | Left Front | FG | 4,165 | 11.45% | | |
| Jacques Pince | Regionalist | REG | 1,032 | 2.84% | | |
| Jimmy Gimenez | Regionalist | REG | 587 | 1.61% | | |
| Linda Manceau | | CEN | 549 | 1.51% | | |
| Pierre Granet | Far Left | EXG | 289 | 0.79% | | |
| Lucile Souche | Far Left | EXG | 269 | 0.74% | | |
| Chantal Clamer | Miscellaneous Right | DVD | 143 | 0.39% | | |
| Total | | | 36,366 | 100% | 33,695 | 100% |
| Registered voters | | | 59,754 | | 59,751 | |
| Blank/Void ballots | | | 770 | 2.07% | 1,535 | 4.36% |
| Turnout | | | 37,136 | 62.15% | 35,230 | 58.96% |
| Abstentions | | | 22,618 | 37.85% | 24,521 | 41.04% |
| Result | | | | | PS HOLD | |

=== 2007 ===
Summary of the 10 June and 17 June 2007 French legislative in Ariège’s 2nd Constituency election results
| Candidate | Party | | 1st round | | 2nd round | |
| Candidate | Party | | Votes | % | Votes | % |
|---|---|---|---|---|---|---|
| Henri Nayrou | Socialist Party | PS | 15,997 | 43.00% | 22,692 | 61.05% |
| Philippe Calleja | Union for a Popular Movement | UMP | 11,506 | 30.93% | 14,477 | 38.95% |
| Michel Naudy | Communist | COM | 2,025 | 5.44% | | |
| Caroline Couve | Democratic Movement | MoDem | 1,786 | 4.80% | | |
| Thérèse Aliot | National Front | FN | 1,233 | 3.31% | | |
| Françoise Matricon | The Greens | VEC | 1,228 | 3.30% | | |
| Marie-Angèle Claret | Far Left | EXG | 1,084 | 2.91% | | |
| Marie-José Darde | Hunting, Fishing, Nature, Traditions | CPNT | 645 | 1.73% | | |
| Chantal Clamer | Movement for France | MPF | 485 | 1.30% | | |
| Véronique Rios-Rebaud | Divers | DIV | 346 | 0.93% | | |
| Raymond Chaumont | Ecologist | ECO | 244 | 0.66% | | |
| Jacqueline Santi | Far Left | EXG | 221 | 0.59% | | |
| Pascale Decla | Far Right | EXD | 157 | 0.42% | | |
| Françoise Hocquard | Majorité Présidentielle | | 138 | 0.37% | | |
| Pierre Gueguen | Far Left | EXG | 105 | 0.28% | | |
| Total | | | 37,200 | 100% | 37,169 | 100% |
| Registered voters | | | 58,240 | | 58,234 | |
| Blank/Void ballots | | | 972 | 2.55% | 1,477 | 3.82% |
| Turnout | | | 38,172 | 65.54% | 38,646 | 66.36% |
| Abstentions | | | 20,068 | 34.46% | 19,588 | 33.64% |
| Result | | | | | PS HOLD | |

=== 2002 ===
Legislative Election 2002: Ariège's 2nd constituency
| Party | Candidate | Votes | % | ±% |
|---|---|---|---|---|
| PS | Henri Nayrou | 14,663 | 39.14 | |
| UMP | Pierre-Louis Maurat | 6,467 | 17.26 | |
| DVD | André Trigano | 5,628 | 15.02 | |
| FN | Therese Aliot | 3,246 | 8.67 | |
| PCF | Josée Souque | 2,069 | 5.52 | |
| CPNT | Jean Guichou | 1,735 | 4.63 | |
| LV | Francoise Matricon | 1,040 | 2.78 | |
| LCR | Fanny Xiberas | 801 | 2.14 | |
| Others | N/A | 1,811 | | |
| Turnout | | 38,517 | 69.80 | |
2nd round result
| PS | Henri Nayrou | 21,033 | 61.75 | |
| UMP | Pierre-Louis Maurat | 13,030 | 38.25 | |
| Turnout | | 36,411 | 65.99 | |
| PS hold | | | | |

=== 1997 ===
Legislative Election 1997: Ariège's 2nd constituency
| Party | Candidate | Votes | % | ±% |
|---|---|---|---|---|
| PS | Henri Nayrou | 14,152 | 37.37 | |
| UDF | André Trigano | 10,504 | 27.74 | |
| PCF | Josée Souque | 4,604 | 12.16 | |
| FN | Etienne Daure | 3,351 | 8.85 | |
| LV | Jean-Charles Sutra | 1,235 | 3.26 | |
| DVE | Michel Andrieu | 1,206 | 3.18 | |
| MPF | Jacques Salomon | 820 | 2.17 | |
| Others | N/A | 1,998 | | |
| Turnout | | 39,699 | 74.13 | |
2nd round result
| PS | Henri Nayrou | 24,054 | 60.83 | |
| UDF | André Trigano | 15,490 | 39.17 | |
| Turnout | | 41,858 | 78.17 | |
| PS gain from UDF | | | | |
