= Lanoux =

Commune in Occitanie, France

- Commune
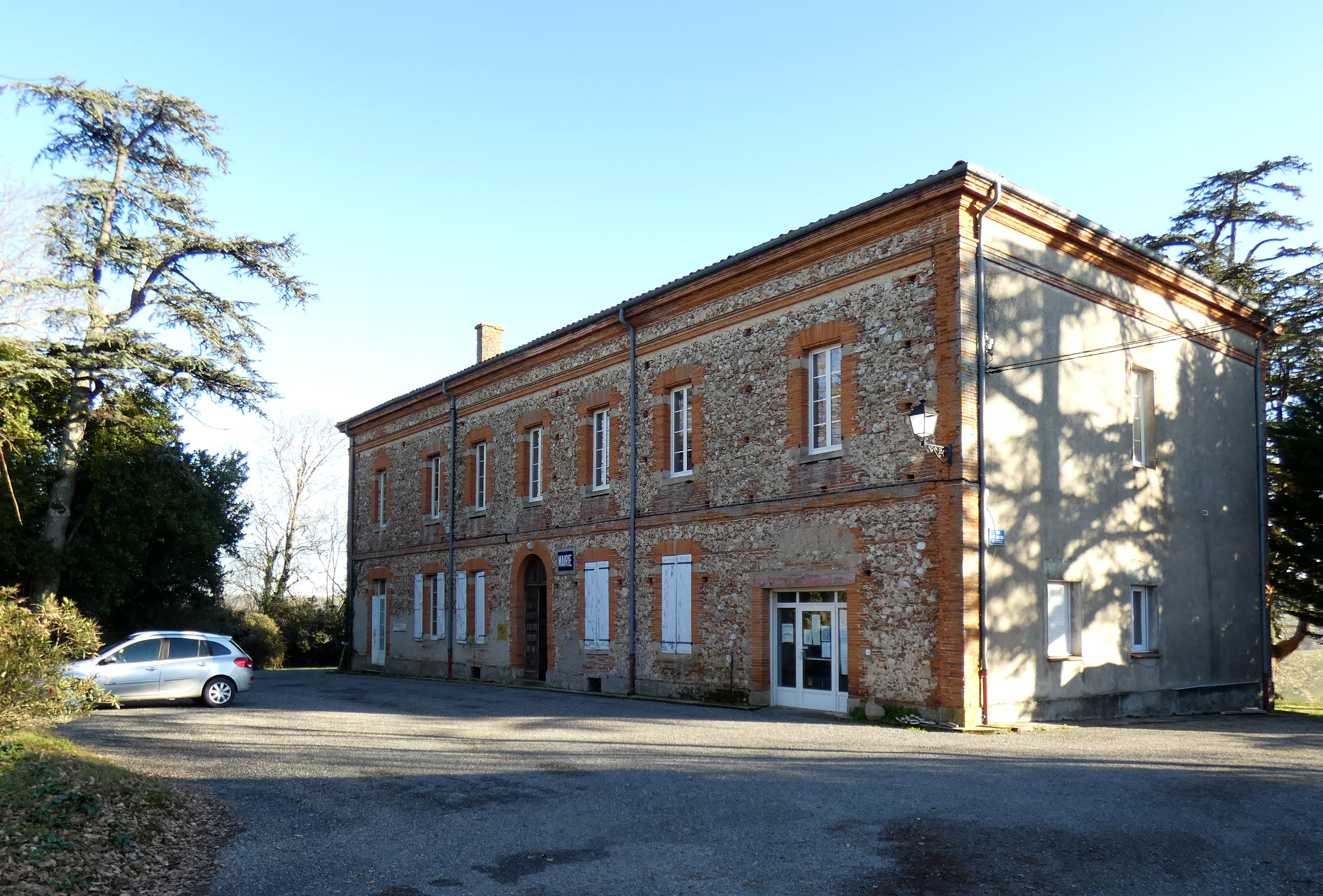
- Town hall
- Location of Lanoux
- Location within France Location within Occitanie
- Coordinates: 43°07′10″N 1°25′38″E
- Country: France
- Region: Occitania
- Department: Ariège
- Arrondissement: Saint-Girons
- Canton: Arize-Lèze

Government
  - Mayor (2024–2026): Mathieu de Kerimel
- Area^{1}: 3.75 km^{2} (1.45 sq mi)
- Elevation: 325 m (1,066 ft)
- Highest elevation: 405 m (1,329 ft)
- Lowest elevation: 270 m (890 ft)
- Population (2023): 60
  - Density: 16/km^{2} (41/sq mi)
- Time zone: UTC+01:00 (CET)
  - Summer (DST): UTC+02:00 (CEST)
- INSEE/Postal code: 09151 /09130
- ^{1} French Land Register data, which excludes lakes, ponds, glaciers > 1 km^{2} (0.386 sq mi or 247 acres) and river estuaries.

Lanoux is a commune in the Ariège department in southwestern France.

== Population ==
Historical population
Year	Pop.	±% p.a.
1968	63	—
1975	52	−2.70%
1982	40	−3.68%
1990	55	+4.06%
1999	53	−0.41%
2007	48	−1.23%
2012	53	+2.00%
2017	50	−1.16%
2023	60	+3.09%
Source: INSEE

== See also ==
- Communes of the Ariège department
