= Château de Castagnac =

Castle in Occitania, France

Coordinates: 43°13′56″N 1°21′06″E

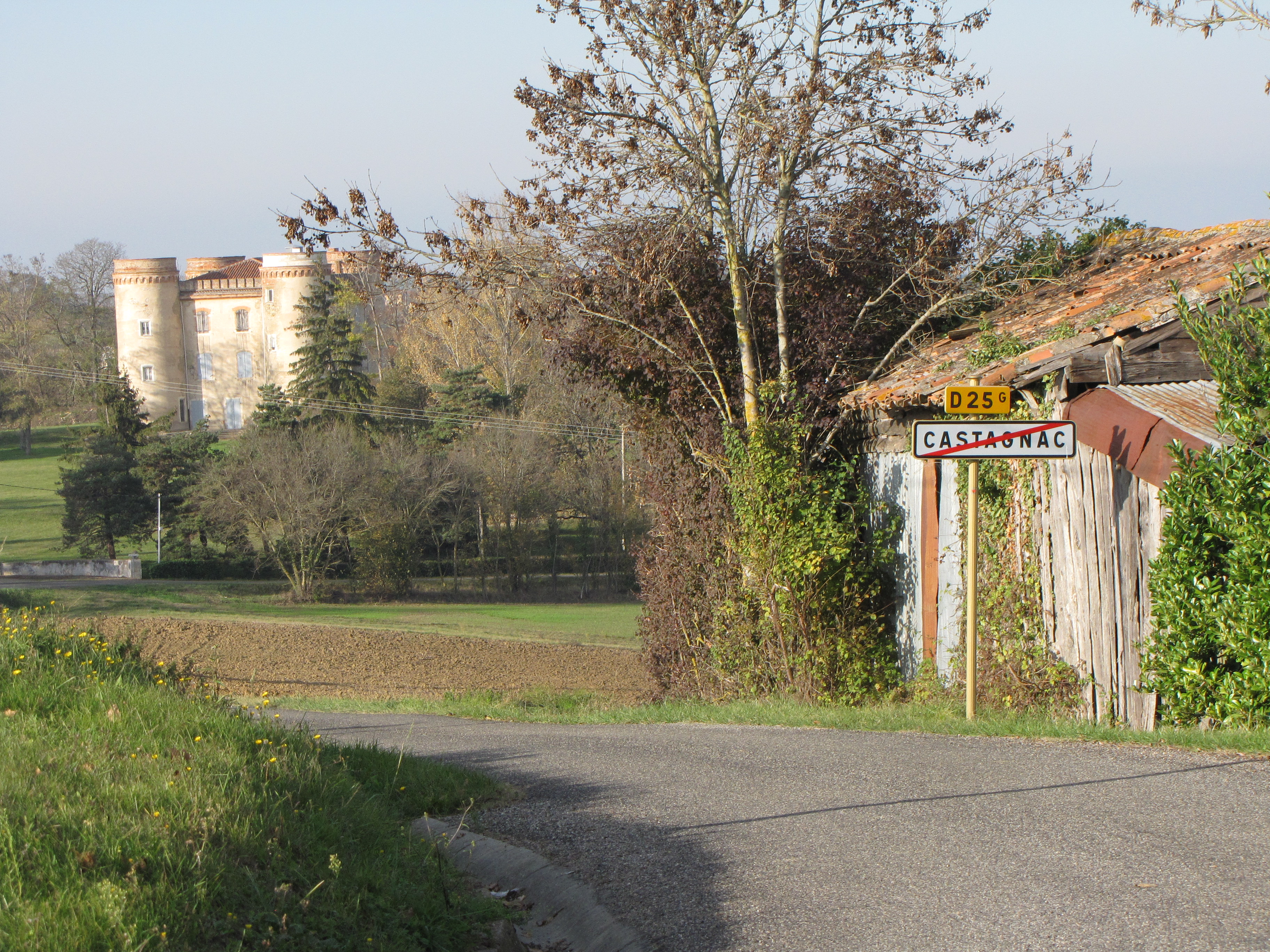

The Château de Castagnac is a castle in the commune of Castagnac in the Haute-Garonne département of France, 40 km (25 miles) south of Toulouse.

== History ==
Arms of the Lordats of Castagnac

Château de Castagnac is a former motte-and-bailey castle transformed around the 12th century into a fortified place.

The oldest document which mentions a seigneur at Castagnac concerns Bernadus de Castagnac and dates from 1162. The coat of arms on the east face of the castle is "d'or à croix de gueules" - gold with a cross of gules (red) - and corresponds to the arms of the Lordats, an ancient chivalric family from the County of Foix.

The Château de Castagnac has been listed by the French Ministry of Culture as a monument historique in its entirety, including its water-filled moat, since 18 March 2003. It is privately owned.

== Architecture ==
The current version of the castle has a rectangular plan comprising four round towers at the corners and presents all of the characteristics of a 14th-century medieval castle, remodelled during the French Renaissance. At the start of the 19th century, it was totally restored by its owners.

This castle is a significant testimony of the history of the Toulouse region; indeed it represents the move from the individualist architectural currents of the Hundred Years' War to the advent of the French Renaissance, transforming a stronghold into a place of comfort.

== See also ==
- List of castles in France
