= Thouars-sur-Arize =

Commune in Occitanie, France

- Commune
- Location of Thouars-sur-Arize
- Location within France Location within Occitanie
- Coordinates: 43°11′10″N 1°14′30″E
- Country: France
- Region: Occitania
- Department: Ariège
- Arrondissement: Saint-Girons
- Canton: Arize-Lèze

Government
  - Mayor (2020–2026): Gaëtano Fallico
- Area^{1}: 2.34 km^{2} (0.90 sq mi)
- Elevation: 244 m (801 ft)
- Highest elevation: 320 m (1,050 ft)
- Lowest elevation: 232 m (761 ft)
- Population (2023): 38
  - Density: 16/km^{2} (42/sq mi)
- Time zone: UTC+01:00 (CET)
  - Summer (DST): UTC+02:00 (CEST)
- INSEE/Postal code: 09310 /09350
- ^{1} French Land Register data, which excludes lakes, ponds, glaciers > 1 km^{2} (0.386 sq mi or 247 acres) and river estuaries.

Thouars-sur-Arize is a commune in the Ariège department in southwestern France.

== Population ==
Inhabitants of Thouars-sur-Arize are called Thouarais in French.

Historical population
Year	Pop.	±% p.a.
1968	44	—
1975	59	+4.28%
1982	37	−6.45%
1990	39	+0.66%
1999	50	+2.80%
2007	47	−0.77%
2012	51	+1.65%
2017	52	+0.39%
2023	38	−5.09%
Source: INSEE

== See also ==
- Communes of the Ariège department
