= Loubaut =

Commune in Occitanie, France

- Commune
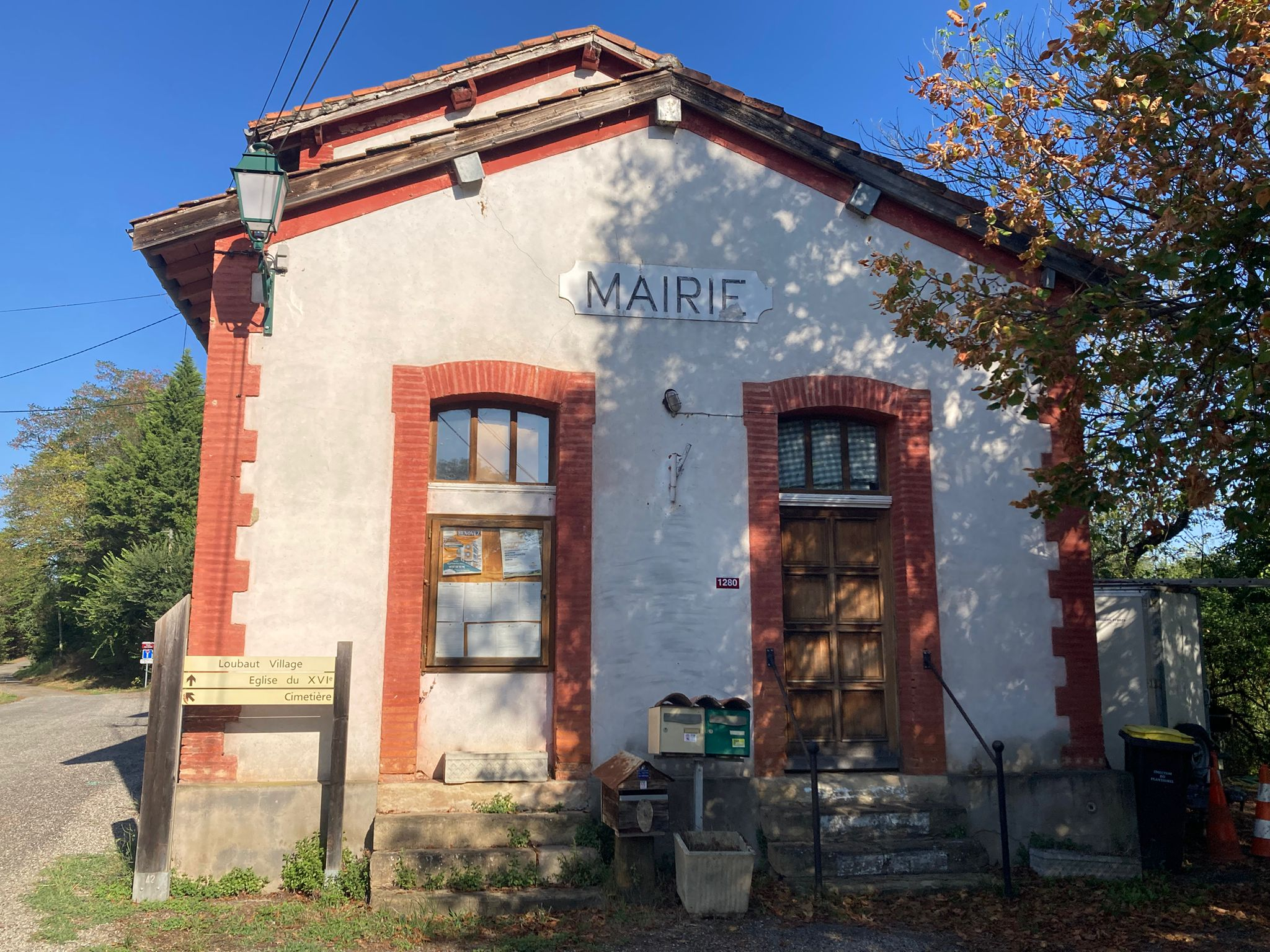
- Loubaut Town hall
- Location of Loubaut
- Location within France Location within Occitanie
- Coordinates: 43°11′22″N 1°17′10″E
- Country: France
- Region: Occitania
- Department: Ariège
- Arrondissement: Saint-Girons
- Canton: Arize-Lèze
- Intercommunality: Arize Lèze

Government
  - Mayor (2022–2026): Ramon Bordallo
- Area^{1}: 2.39 km^{2} (0.92 sq mi)
- Elevation: 398 m (1,306 ft)
- Highest elevation: 392 m (1,286 ft)
- Lowest elevation: 257 m (843 ft)
- Population (2023): 30
  - Density: 13/km^{2} (33/sq mi)
- Time zone: UTC+01:00 (CET)
  - Summer (DST): UTC+02:00 (CEST)
- INSEE/Postal code: 09172 /09350
- ^{1} French Land Register data, which excludes lakes, ponds, glaciers > 1 km^{2} (0.386 sq mi or 247 acres) and river estuaries.

Loubaut is a commune in the Ariège department in southwestern France.

== Population ==
Historical population
Year	Pop.	±% p.a.
1968	30	—
1975	12	−12.27%
1982	19	+6.79%
1990	31	+6.31%
1999	21	−4.24%
2007	31	+4.99%
2012	28	−2.02%
2017	28	+0.00%
2023	30	+1.16%
Source: INSEE

== See also ==
- Communes of the Ariège department
