= Sieuras =

Commune in Occitanie, France

- Commune
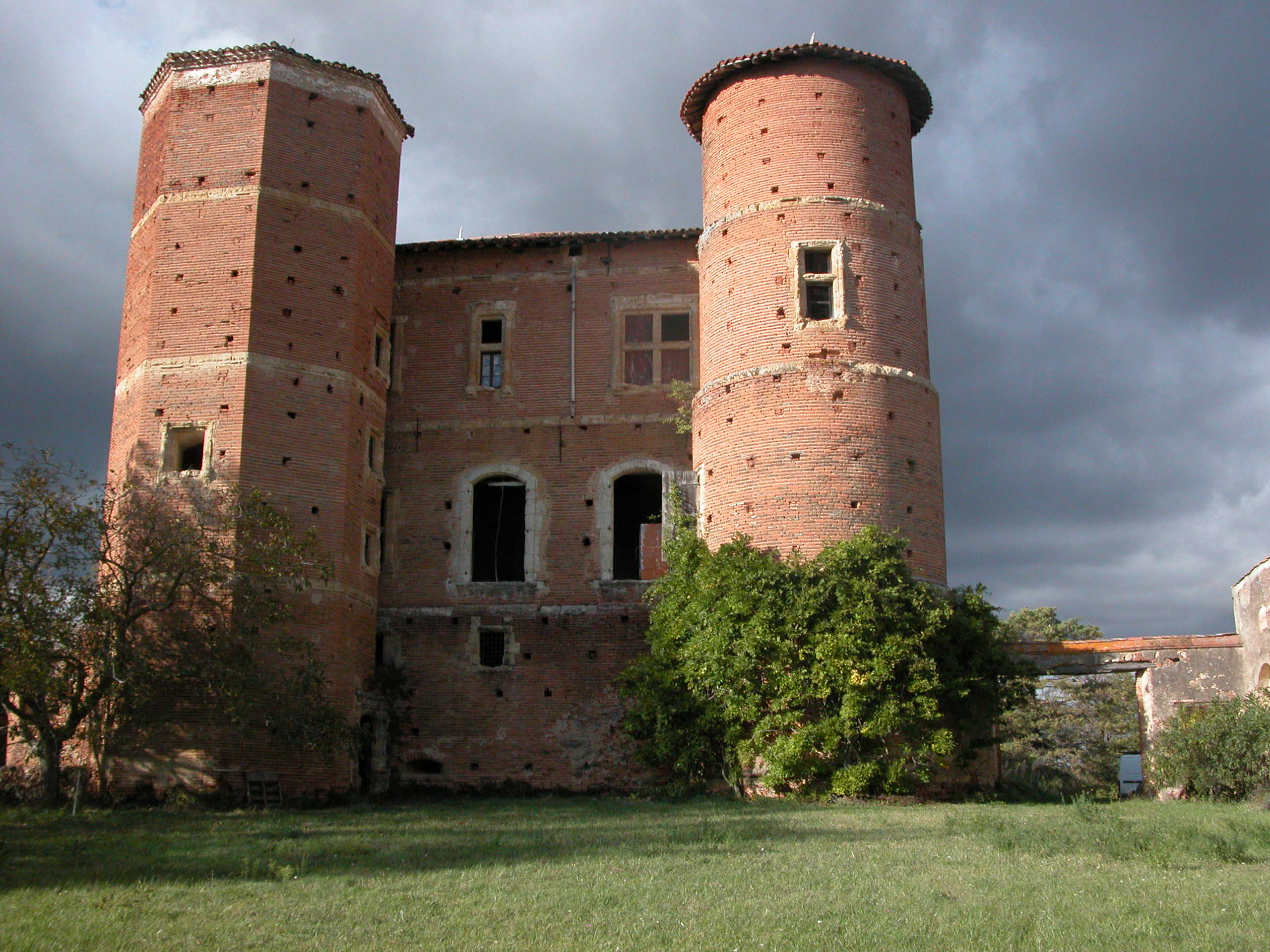
- Chateau Nogarède in Sieuras
- Location of Sieuras
- Location within France Location within Occitanie
- Coordinates: 43°11′06″N 1°20′23″E
- Country: France
- Region: Occitania
- Department: Ariège
- Arrondissement: Saint-Girons
- Canton: Arize-Lèze

Government
  - Mayor (2020–2026): Jean-Louis Cauhapé
- Area^{1}: 7.63 km^{2} (2.95 sq mi)
- Elevation: 380 m (1,250 ft)
- Highest elevation: 408 m (1,339 ft)
- Lowest elevation: 229 m (751 ft)
- Population (2023): 94
  - Density: 12/km^{2} (32/sq mi)
- Time zone: UTC+01:00 (CET)
  - Summer (DST): UTC+02:00 (CEST)
- INSEE/Postal code: 09294 /09130
- ^{1} French Land Register data, which excludes lakes, ponds, glaciers > 1 km^{2} (0.386 sq mi or 247 acres) and river estuaries.

Sieuras is a commune in the Ariège department in southwestern France.

== Population ==
Inhabitants of Sieuras are called Sieurassois in French.

Historical population
Year	Pop.	±% p.a.
1968	89	—
1975	63	−4.82%
1982	74	+2.33%
1990	57	−3.21%
1999	72	+2.63%
2007	79	+1.17%
2012	68	−2.95%
2017	96	+7.14%
2023	94	−0.35%
Source: INSEE

== See also ==
- Communes of the Ariège department
