= Saint-Ybars =

Commune in Occitanie, France

- Commune
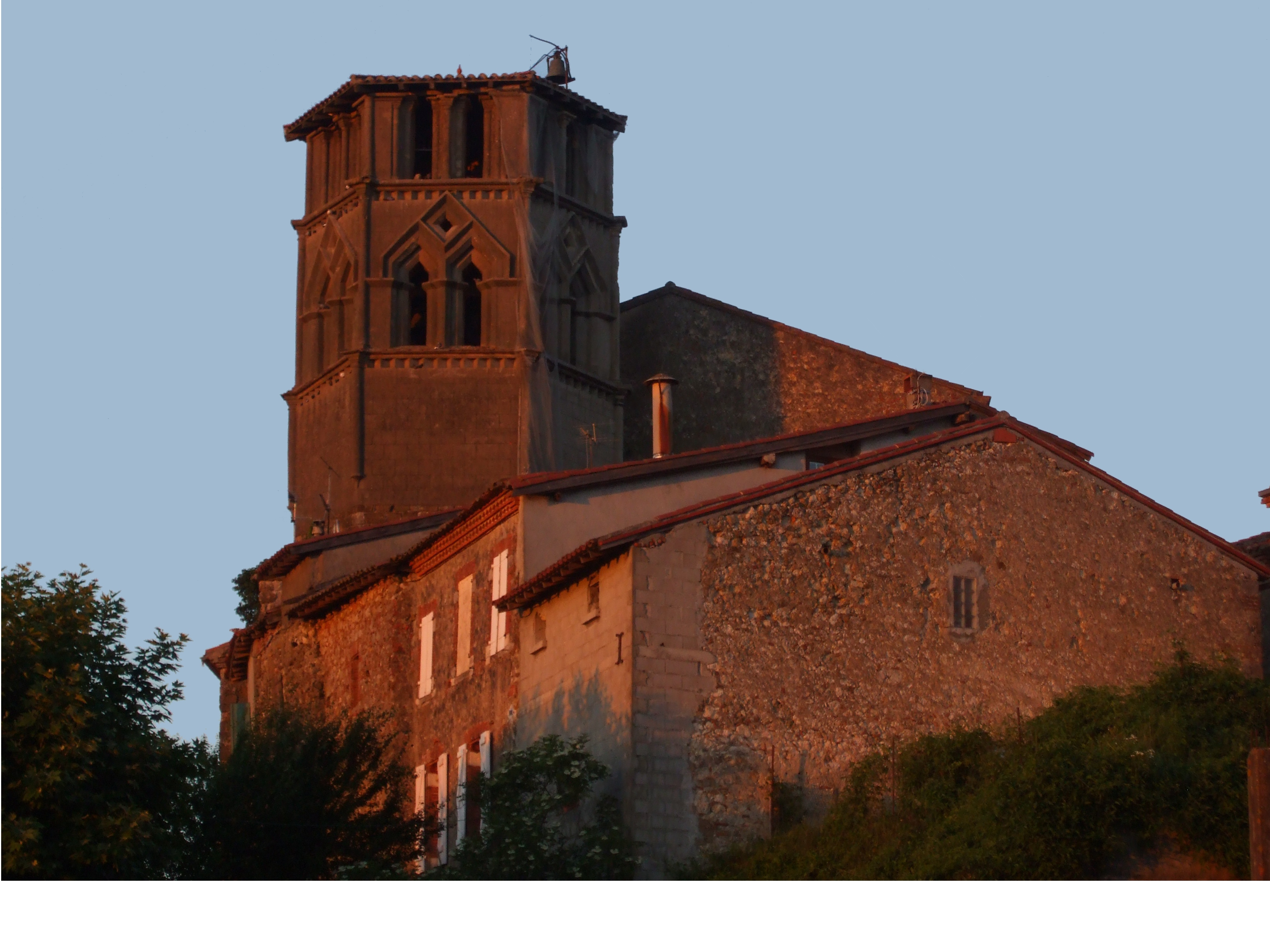
- The church in Saint-Ybars

- Coat of arms
- Location of Saint-Ybars
- Location within France Location within Occitanie
- Coordinates: 43°14′19″N 1°23′12″E
- Country: France
- Region: Occitania
- Department: Ariège
- Arrondissement: Saint-Girons
- Canton: Arize-Lèze

Government
  - Mayor (2020–2026): Francis Boy
- Area^{1}: 24.31 km^{2} (9.39 sq mi)
- Elevation: 290 m (950 ft)
- Highest elevation: 334 m (1,096 ft)
- Lowest elevation: 213 m (699 ft)
- Population (2023): 651
  - Density: 26.8/km^{2} (69.4/sq mi)
- Time zone: UTC+01:00 (CET)
  - Summer (DST): UTC+02:00 (CEST)
- INSEE/Postal code: 09277 /09210
- ^{1} French Land Register data, which excludes lakes, ponds, glaciers > 1 km^{2} (0.386 sq mi or 247 acres) and river estuaries.

Saint-Ybars is a commune in the Ariège department in southwestern France. In 1949, part of its territory was detached to form the new commune of Sainte-Suzanne .

== Population ==
Inhabitants of Saint-Ybars are called Eparchois in French.

Historical population
Year	Pop.	±% p.a.
1968	654	—
1975	524	−3.12%
1982	476	−1.36%
1990	512	+0.92%
1999	561	+1.02%
2007	639	+1.64%
2012	652	+0.40%
2017	667	+0.46%
2023	651	−0.40%
Source: INSEE

== Geography ==
The Lèze forms part of the commune's western border.

== See also ==
- Communes of the Ariège department
