= Gilbert Trigano =

French businessman (1920–2001)

- Born: 28 July 1920; Saint-Maurice, France
- Died: 4 February 2001 (aged 80); 16th arrondissement of Paris, France
- Occupation: President of Club Med
- Spouse: Simone Sabah
- Children: 4
- Relatives: André Trigano (brother)

Gilbert Trigano (1920–2001) was a French businessman.
