= Le Fossat =

Commune in Occitanie, France

- Commune
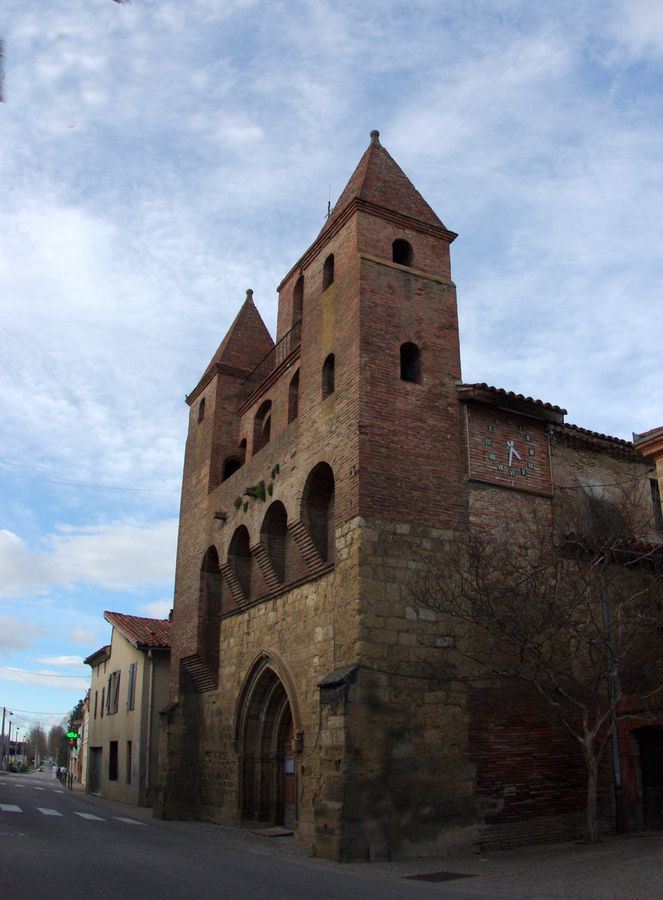
- The church in Le Fossat

- Coat of arms
- Location of Le Fossat
- Location within France Location within Occitanie
- Coordinates: 43°10′30″N 1°24′32″E
- Country: France
- Region: Occitania
- Department: Ariège
- Arrondissement: Saint-Girons
- Canton: Arize-Lèze

Government
  - Mayor (2024–2026): François Arnaud
- Area^{1}: 14.41 km^{2} (5.56 sq mi)
- Elevation: 243 m (797 ft)
- Highest elevation: 353 m (1,158 ft)
- Lowest elevation: 231 m (758 ft)
- Population (2023): 1,071
  - Density: 74.32/km^{2} (192.5/sq mi)
- Time zone: UTC+01:00 (CET)
  - Summer (DST): UTC+02:00 (CEST)
- INSEE/Postal code: 09124 /09130
- ^{1} French Land Register data, which excludes lakes, ponds, glaciers > 1 km^{2} (0.386 sq mi or 247 acres) and river estuaries.

Le Fossat (French pronunciation: [lə fɔsa]) is a commune in the Ariège department in southwestern France.

== Geography ==
The Lèze flows northwest through the middle of the commune and crosses the village.

== Population ==
Historical population
Year	Pop.	±% p.a.
1968	656	—
1975	687	+0.66%
1982	658	−0.61%
1990	754	+1.72%
1999	783	+0.42%
2007	990	+2.98%
2012	1,077	+1.70%
2017	1,037	−0.75%
2023	1,071	+0.54%
Source: INSEE

== See also ==
- Communes of the Ariège department
