= Montfa, Ariège =

Commune in Occitanie, France

Montfa
- Commune
- Location of Montfa
- Location within France Location within Occitanie
- Coordinates: 43°06′02″N 1°17′04″E
- Country: France
- Region: Occitania
- Department: Ariège
- Arrondissement: Saint-Girons
- Canton: Arize-Lèze

Government
  - Mayor (2020–2026): Diane Gilliot
- Area^{1}: 8.54 km^{2} (3.30 sq mi)
- Elevation: 430 m (1,410 ft)
- Highest elevation: 571 m (1,873 ft)
- Lowest elevation: 313 m (1,027 ft)
- Population (2023): 96
  - Density: 11/km^{2} (29/sq mi)
- Time zone: UTC+01:00 (CET)
  - Summer (DST): UTC+02:00 (CEST)
- INSEE/Postal code: 09205 /09350
- ^{1} French Land Register data, which excludes lakes, ponds, glaciers > 1 km^{2} (0.386 sq mi or 247 acres) and river estuaries.

Montfa (French pronunciation: [mɔ̃fa]; Occitan: Montfan) is a commune in the Ariège department in southwestern France.

== Population ==
Historical population
Year	Pop.	±% p.a.
1968	66	—
1975	64	−0.44%
1982	64	+0.00%
1990	62	−0.40%
1999	72	+1.68%
2007	77	+0.84%
2012	80	+0.77%
2017	82	+0.50%
2023	96	+2.66%
Source: INSEE

== See also ==
- Communes of the Ariège department
