= André Trigano =

French businessman and politician (1925–2024)

Mayor of Pamiers
- In office 18 June 1995 – 28 June 2020
- Preceded by: François Bernard Soula
- Succeeded by: Frédérique Thiennot

Deputy of Ariège's 2nd constituency
- In office 2 April 1993 – 21 April 1997
- Preceded by: René Massat
- Succeeded by: Henri Neyrou

Personal details
- Born: 13 September 1925; Montreuil, France
- Died: 6 May 2024 (aged 98)
- Children: 2
- Relatives: Gilbert Trigano (brother)

André Trigano (French pronunciation: [ɑ̃dʁe tʁiɡano]; 13 September 1925 – 6 May 2024) was a French businessman and politician who was the mayor of Pamiers in the French Pyrenees, a post he held from 1995 until 2020.

== Biography ==
Trigano was born to immigrant Sephardic Algerian Jewish parents in Montreuil in 1925 and was 15 years old when the Nazis occupied the city during World War II. The family fled to the mountains of Ariège in the south of France when his parents were tipped off by a police officer who lived in their building that their names were on a Gestapo arrest warrant. Trigano then joined the Resistance and was involved in assisting downed Allied pilots by forging documents that allowed them to escape to nearby Spain. He was arrested three times during the war by the Nazis.

After the war, Trigano started a camping holiday business to complement his family's tent-making business. They subsequently won a contract to supply tents to the newly established Club Med – which in its first 15 years was a camping holiday business – renting tents for vacations in locations such as Majorca, Corfu and Djerba in Tunisia. Trigano was the founder of the Campéole group, which now includes 40 campsites in France and Corsica. This company was sold to the Central Fund of Social Activities of the Electricity and Gas Industries (CCAS) on 30 December 2009.

Trigano had a long career in politics, first serving as mayor of Mazeres between 1971 and 1995, while simultaneously serving as a deputy in the National Assembly for the 2nd constituency of Ariège. He held the office of the mayor of Pamiers from 1995 until 2020 and was succeeded by Frédérique Thiennot. He has contested 19 elections, was re-elected in the first round in 2008 with 50.65% of votes and has lost twice.

Trigano was also a racing driver, a member of the second district of Ariege from 1993 to 1997, and chairman of the Committee on Tourism Midi-Pyrenees. He was general counsel of the township of Saverdun for 12 years. On 14 December 2012, Trigano sued Milan Kovac of Bratislava, Slovakia for infringing on copyright and trademark laws by registering the domain name www.andretrigano.com. The WIPO ruled in favor of Trigano and ordered the domain to be transferred to him.

== Personal life and death ==
Trigano was a classic car collector. He had a collection of around 180 classic cars, which have since been sold as of September 2020, including vintage Citroens, Cadillacs, Triumphs, Rolls Royces, and an Excalibur.

Trigano died on 6 May 2024, at the age of 98.

== Awards and honours ==
- Officier de la Légion d’honneur, 2008
- Commandeur de l'ordre national du Mérite, 2011
