= Sainte-Suzanne, Ariège =

Commune in Occitanie, France

Sainte-Suzanne
- Commune
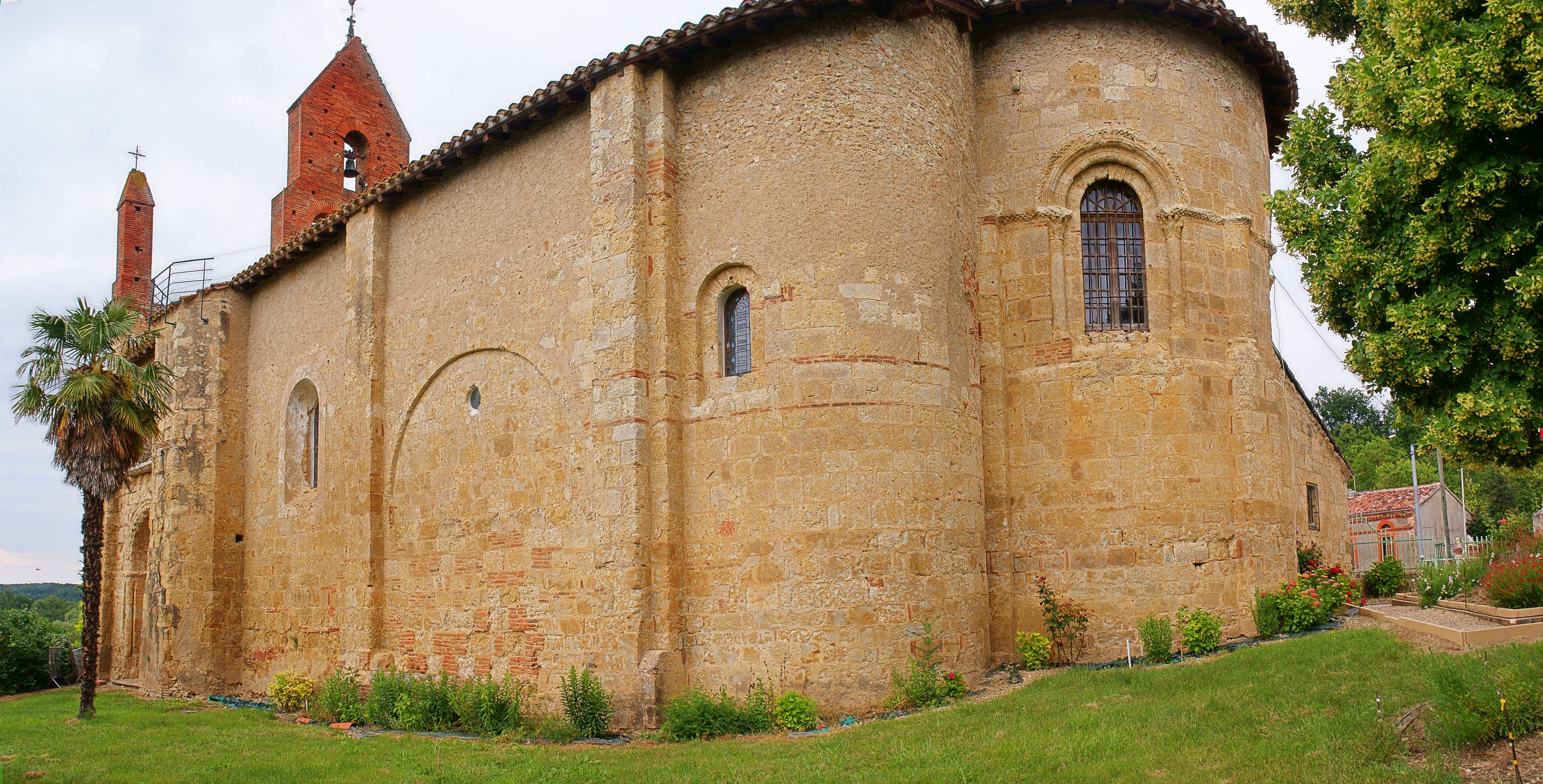
- The church in Sainte-Suzanne
- Location of Sainte-Suzanne
- Location within France Location within Occitanie
- Coordinates: 43°12′40″N 1°23′14″E
- Country: France
- Region: Occitania
- Department: Ariège
- Arrondissement: Saint-Girons
- Canton: Arize-Lèze

Government
  - Mayor (2020–2026): Elisabeth Albero
- Area^{1}: 10.39 km^{2} (4.01 sq mi)
- Elevation: 290 m (950 ft)
- Highest elevation: 361 m (1,184 ft)
- Lowest elevation: 220 m (720 ft)
- Population (2023): 259
  - Density: 24.9/km^{2} (64.6/sq mi)
- Time zone: UTC+01:00 (CET)
  - Summer (DST): UTC+02:00 (CEST)
- INSEE/Postal code: 09342 /09130
- ^{1} French Land Register data, which excludes lakes, ponds, glaciers > 1 km^{2} (0.386 sq mi or 247 acres) and river estuaries.

Sainte-Suzanne (French pronunciation: [sɛ̃t syzan]; Occitan: Senta Susana) is a commune in the Ariège department in southwestern France. It was created from part of the commune of Saint-Ybars in 1949.

== Geography ==
The Lèze flows north through the middle of the commune and crosses the village.

== Population ==
Inhabitants Sainte-Suzanne are called Sainte-Suzannois in French.

Historical population
| Year | Pop. | ±% p.a. |
|---|---|---|
| 1968 | 233 | — |
| 1975 | 224 | −0.56% |
| 1982 | 190 | −2.32% |
| 1990 | 174 | −1.09% |
| 1999 | 192 | +1.10% |
| 2007 | 236 | +2.61% |
| 2012 | 239 | +0.25% |
| 2017 | 238 | −0.08% |
| 2023 | 259 | +1.42% |
Source: INSEE

== See also ==
- Communes of the Ariège department
