= Méras =

Commune in Occitanie, France

- Commune
- Coat of arms
- Location of Méras
- Location within France Location within Occitanie
- Coordinates: 43°10′59″N 1°18′42″E
- Country: France
- Region: Occitania
- Department: Ariège
- Arrondissement: Saint-Girons
- Canton: Arize-Lèze

Government
  - Mayor (2020–2026): Liliane Descuns
- Area^{1}: 3.69 km^{2} (1.42 sq mi)
- Elevation: 385 m (1,263 ft)
- Highest elevation: 395 m (1,296 ft)
- Lowest elevation: 264 m (866 ft)
- Population (2023): 94
  - Density: 25/km^{2} (66/sq mi)
- Time zone: UTC+01:00 (CET)
  - Summer (DST): UTC+02:00 (CEST)
- INSEE/Postal code: 09186 /09350
- ^{1} French Land Register data, which excludes lakes, ponds, glaciers > 1 km^{2} (0.386 sq mi or 247 acres) and river estuaries.

Méras (Occitan: Meras) is a commune in the Ariège department in southwestern France.

== Population ==
Historical population
Year	Pop.	±% p.a.
1968	71	—
1975	73	+0.40%
1982	63	−2.08%
1990	45	−4.12%
1999	61	+3.44%
2007	76	+2.79%
2012	102	+6.06%
2017	111	+1.71%
2023	94	−2.73%
Source: INSEE

== See also ==
- Communes of the Ariège department
