= Arize =

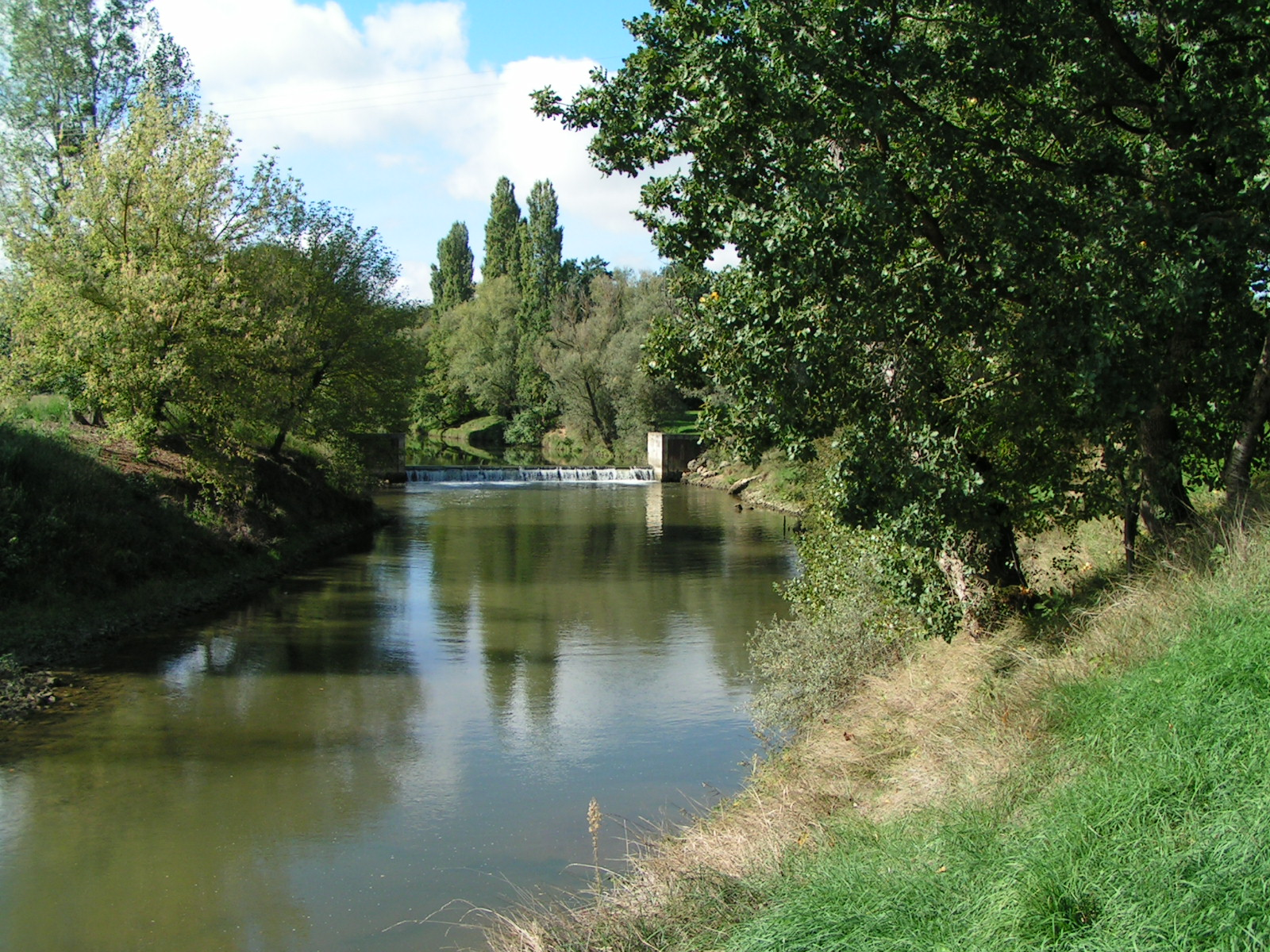

- Location within France Location within Occitanie

Location
- Country: France

Physical characteristics
- Source
  - location: Pyrenees
  - elevation: 1,355 m (4,446 ft)
- Mouth
  - location: Garonne
  - coordinates: 43°17′19″N 1°13′33″E
- Length: 84 km (52 mi)

Basin features
- Progression: Garonne→ Gironde estuary→ Atlantic Ocean

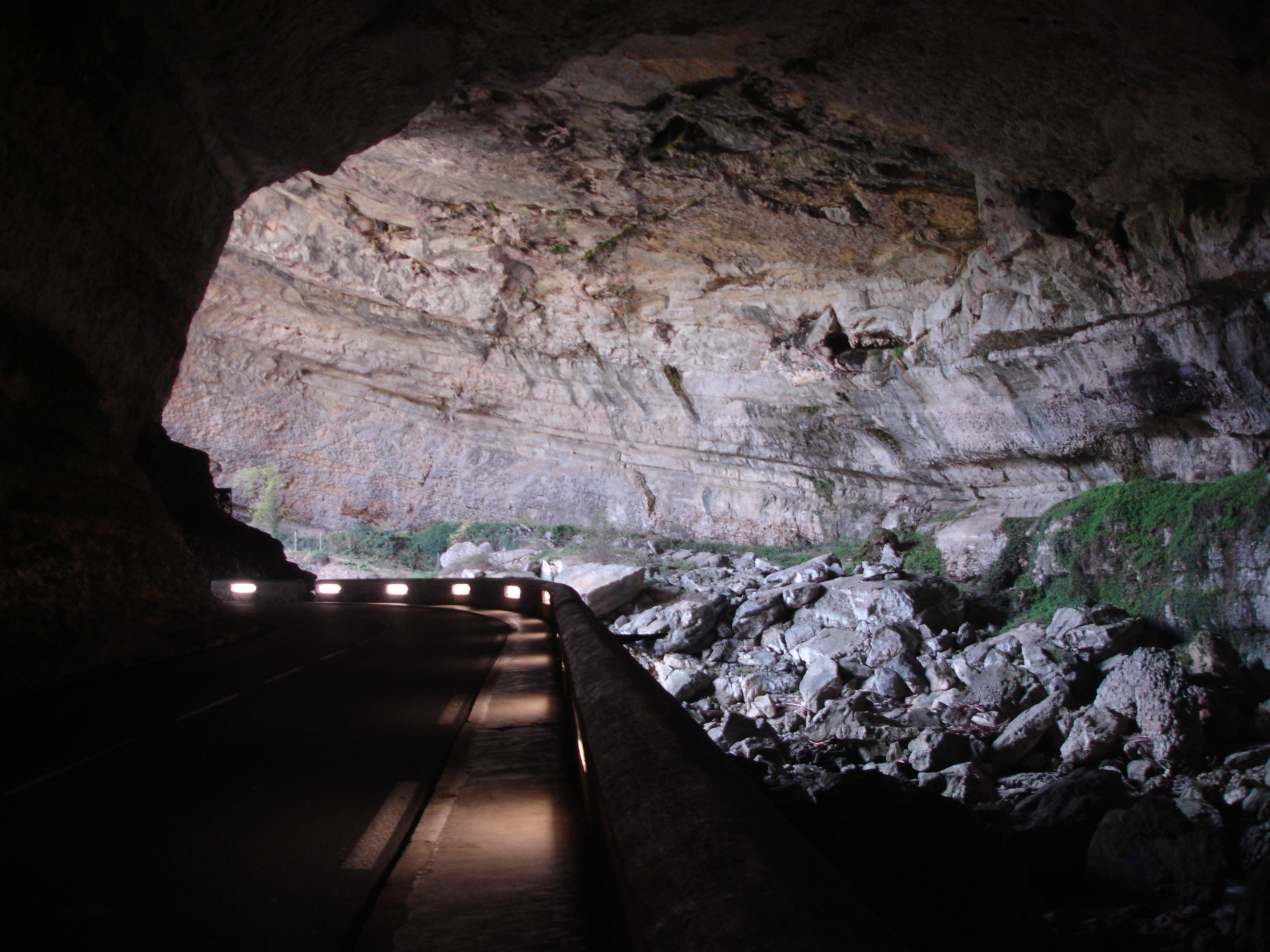
The grotto of Mas-d'Azil

The Arize (French pronunciation: [aʁiz]; Occitan: Arisa) is a river of France, a right tributary of the Garonne. It arises at 1,355 metres (4,446 ft) in the massif of Arize, in the Pyrenees, in the department of Ariège. The Arize is 83.8 km (52.1 mi) long and flows into the Garonne at Carbonne.

In its first four or five kilometres (2.5 or 3.1 mi) it is called the Péguère. It formed the grotto of Le Mas-d'Azil.
