= Artigat =

Commune in Occitanie, France

- Commune
- Location of Artigat
- Location within France Location within Occitanie
- Coordinates: 43°08′12″N 1°26′26″E
- Country: France
- Region: Occitania
- Department: Ariège
- Arrondissement: Saint-Girons
- Canton: Arize-Lèze
- Intercommunality: CC Arize Lèze

Government
  - Mayor (2020–2026): François Vanderstraeten
- Area^{1}: 23.9 km^{2} (9.2 sq mi)
- Elevation: 265 m (869 ft)
- Highest elevation: 434 m (1,424 ft)
- Lowest elevation: 242 m (794 ft)
- Population (2023): 574
  - Density: 24.0/km^{2} (62.2/sq mi)
- Time zone: UTC+01:00 (CET)
  - Summer (DST): UTC+02:00 (CEST)
- INSEE/Postal code: 09019 /09130
- ^{1} French Land Register data, which excludes lakes, ponds, glaciers > 1 km^{2} (0.386 sq mi or 247 acres) and river estuaries.

Artigat is a commune in the Ariège department in the Occitanie region of south-western France.

== Geography ==
Artigat is located some 10 kilometres (6.2 mi) west by north-west of Pamiers and 14 kilometres (8.7 mi) south-west of Saverdun. Access to the commune is by the D919 road from Le Fossat in the north passing through the heart of the commune and the village and continuing south to Pailhès. The D278 road comes from the D26 on the western border of the commune and goes east through the village to join the D36 south-west of Saint-Michel. The D27A also branches from the D919 in the north of the commune and goes east to Saint-Martin-d'Oydes. Apart from the village there are also the hamlets of Bajou in the north, and Les Lanes east of the village. The commune has extensive forests covering about 40% of the land area with the rest farmland.

The Lèze River flows through the commune from south to north gathering several tributaries including the Ruisseau de Laurens with its many tributaries.

== History ==
Until the French Revolution, the Parish of Artigat (with Bajou), as with those of Pailhès, Lanoux, Castéras, Gabre, Aigues-Juntes, Montégut-Plantaurel, Cazeaux, Artix, Saint-Bauzeil, Benagues, Saint-Victor-Rouzaud, Madière, Saint-Michel, Lescousse, Saint-Martin-d'Oydes, and Esplas formed an enclave of Languedoc. They all depended on the Episcopal Diocese of Rieux and the civil diocese of Toulouse while neighbouring communes were part of the County of Foix. See the Cassini Map.

The Parish of Artigat (shown as Arugat on the Cassini Map) was certainly the most important parish of this Languedoc enclave. The famous case of Martin Guerre took place in Artigat.

There was a flood in the autumn of 2006 in Artigat whereupon a moat was built in the village.

== Administration ==
List of Successive Mayors

| From | To | Name |
|---|---|---|
| 1995 | 2014 | Patrick Cauhope |
| 2014 | 2026 | François Vanderstraeten |

== Demography ==
The inhabitants of the commune are known as Artigatois or Artigatoises in French.

Historical population

| Year | Pop. | ±% p.a. |
|---|---|---|
| 1793 | 932 | — |
| 1800 | 909 | −0.36% |
| 1806 | 980 | +1.26% |
| 1821 | 1,027 | +0.31% |
| 1831 | 1,204 | +1.60% |
| 1836 | 1,218 | +0.23% |
| 1841 | 1,218 | +0.00% |
| 1846 | 1,248 | +0.49% |
| 1851 | 1,239 | −0.14% |
| 1856 | 1,258 | +0.30% |
| 1861 | 1,300 | +0.66% |
| 1866 | 1,277 | −0.36% |
| 1872 | 1,281 | +0.05% |
| 1876 | 1,227 | −1.07% |
| 1881 | 1,112 | −1.95% |
| 1886 | 1,023 | −1.65% |
| 1891 | 1,055 | +0.62% |
| 1896 | 1,006 | −0.95% |
| 1901 | 962 | −0.89% |

| Year | Pop. | ±% p.a. |
|---|---|---|
| 1906 | 930 | −0.67% |
| 1911 | 904 | −0.57% |
| 1921 | 813 | −1.06% |
| 1926 | 822 | +0.22% |
| 1931 | 792 | −0.74% |
| 1936 | 701 | −2.41% |
| 1946 | 665 | −0.53% |
| 1954 | 626 | −0.75% |
| 1962 | 518 | −2.34% |
| 1968 | 470 | −1.61% |
| 1975 | 460 | −0.31% |
| 1982 | 367 | −3.18% |
| 1990 | 416 | +1.58% |
| 1999 | 516 | +2.42% |
| 2007 | 522 | +0.14% |
| 2012 | 578 | +2.06% |
| 2017 | 564 | −0.49% |
| 2023 | 574 | +0.29% |

Source: EHESS and INSEE

== Notable people linked to the commune ==
- Martin Guerre (c. 1524), Subject of a famous imposture affair which took place in Artigat in the 16th century.
- Claude Bergeaud (1960-), French basketball trainer was born in Artigat.

== See also ==
- Communes of the Ariège department
- Artigat on the National Geographic Institute website (in French)
