= Aigues-Juntes =

Commune in Occitanie, France

- Commune
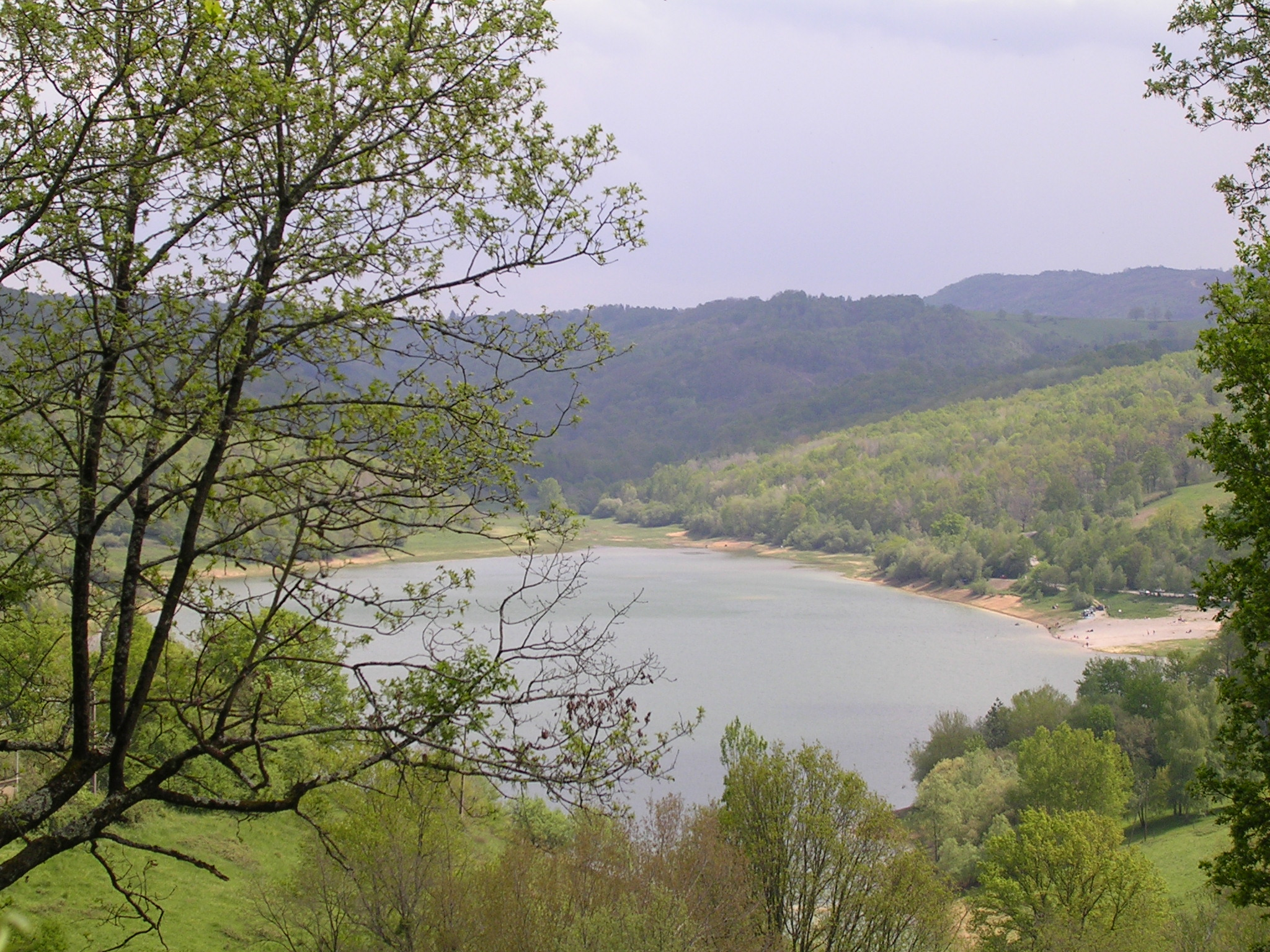
- Mondély Lake
- Location of Aigues-Juntes
- Location within France Location within Occitanie
- Coordinates: 43°03′23″N 1°28′18″E
- Country: France
- Region: Occitania
- Department: Ariège
- Arrondissement: Saint-Girons
- Canton: Couserans Est
- Intercommunality: Couserans-Pyrénées

Government
  - Mayor (2020–2026): Gilles Soula
- Area^{1}: 7.77 km^{2} (3.00 sq mi)
- Elevation: 580 m (1,900 ft)
- Highest elevation: 616 m (2,021 ft)
- Lowest elevation: 340 m (1,120 ft)
- Population (2023): 59
  - Density: 7.6/km^{2} (20/sq mi)
- Time zone: UTC+01:00 (CET)
  - Summer (DST): UTC+02:00 (CEST)
- INSEE/Postal code: 09001 /09240
- ^{1} French Land Register data, which excludes lakes, ponds, glaciers > 1 km^{2} (0.386 sq mi or 247 acres) and river estuaries.

Aigues-Juntes (French pronunciation: [ɛɡ ʒœ̃t]; Occitan: Aigasjuntas) is a commune in the Ariège department in southwestern France.

== Geography ==
The Lèze, tributary of the Ariège, forms part of the commune's southwestern and northwestern borders.

== Politics and administration ==
List of successive Mayors of Aigues-Juntes
In office		Name	Party	Capacity	Ref.
March 1959	March 2001	Paul Begou	PCF		
March 2001	Incumbent	Gilles Soula	DVG	Farmer	

== Population ==
Inhabitants of Aigues-Juntes are called Aigues-Juntais in French.

Historical population
Year	Pop.	±% p.a.
1968	81	—
1975	63	−3.53%
1982	59	−0.93%
1990	42	−4.16%
1999	49	+1.73%
2007	39	−2.81%
2012	47	+3.80%
2017	67	+7.35%
2023	59	−2.10%
Source: INSEE

== Local culture and patrimony ==
- Lac de Mondély, located across three communes: Aigues-Juntes, La Bastide-de-Sérou and Gabre.

== See also ==
- Communes of the Ariège department
