= Le Vernet =

Le Vernet or Vernet is the name or part of the name of the following communes in France:

- Le Vernet, Allier, in the Allier department
- Le Vernet, Alpes-de-Haute-Provence, in the Alpes-de-Haute-Provence department
- Le Vernet, Ariège, in the Ariège department
- Vernet, Haute-Garonne, in the Haute-Garonne department
- Le Vernet, Haute-Loire, in the Haute-Loire department
- Vernet-la-Varenne, in the Puy-de-Dôme department
- Vernet-les-Bains, in the Pyrénées-Orientales department
- Le Vernet-Sainte-Marguerite, in the Puy-de-Dôme department

== Other uses ==
- Camp Vernet, a concentration camp in Le Vernet, Ariège 1940-44 under the Vichy government

== See also ==
- Vernet, a surname
- Les Vernets, an arena in Geneva
