= Labarthe-sur-Lèze =

- Commune
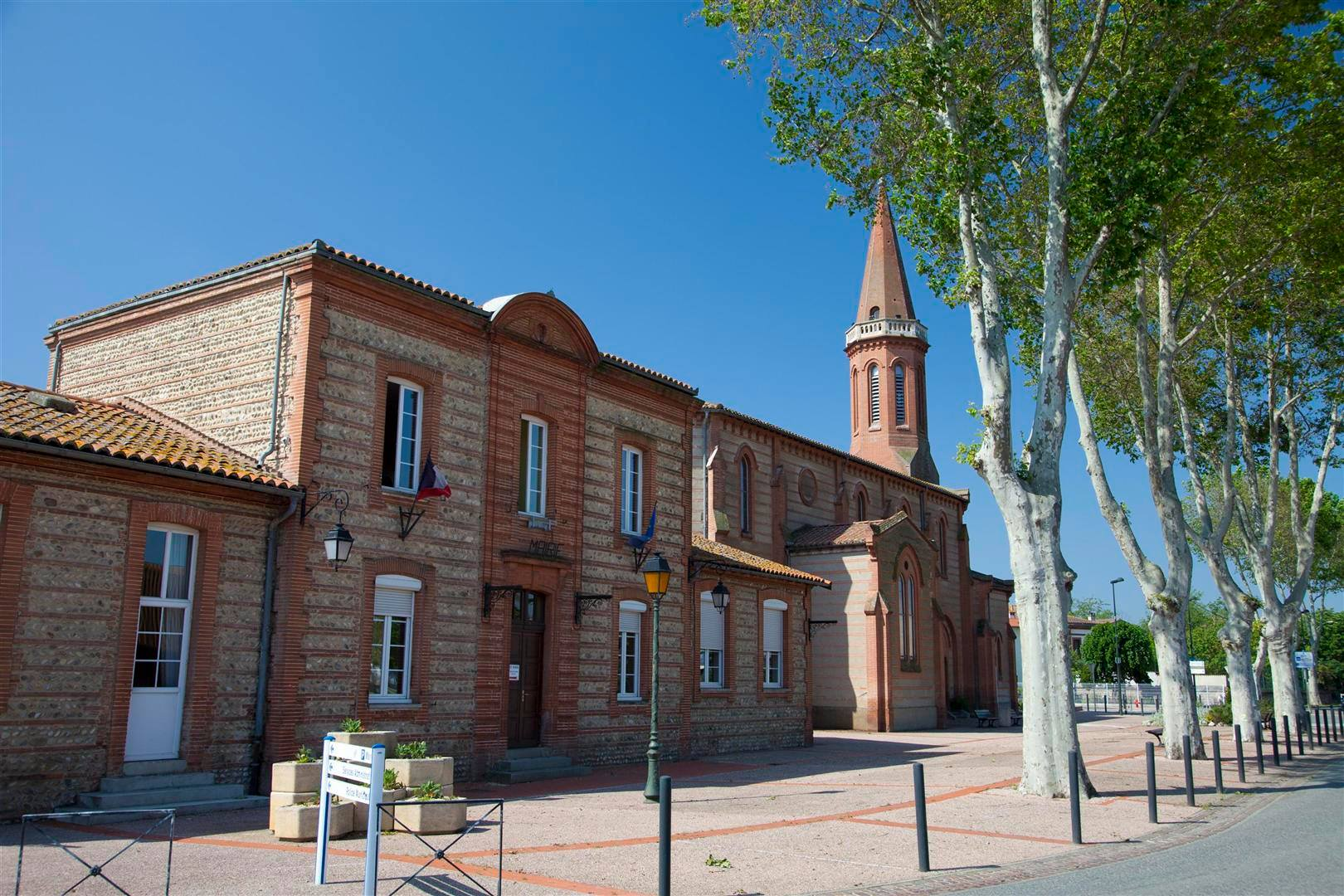
- The town hall in Labarthe-sur-Lèze

- Coat of arms
- Location of Labarthe-sur-Lèze
- Location within France Location within Occitanie
- Coordinates: 43°27′10″N 1°24′03″E
- Country: France
- Region: Occitania
- Department: Haute-Garonne
- Arrondissement: Muret
- Canton: Portet-sur-Garonne
- Intercommunality: Le Muretain Agglo

Government
  - Mayor (2020–2026): Yves Cadas
- Area^{1}: 10.43 km^{2} (4.03 sq mi)
- Elevation: 162 m (531 ft)
- Highest elevation: 173 m (568 ft)
- Lowest elevation: 151 m (495 ft)
- Population (2023): 6,585
  - Density: 631.4/km^{2} (1,635/sq mi)
- Time zone: UTC+01:00 (CET)
  - Summer (DST): UTC+02:00 (CEST)
- INSEE/Postal code: 31248 /31860
- ^{1} French Land Register data, which excludes lakes, ponds, glaciers > 1 km^{2} (0.386 sq mi or 247 acres) and river estuaries.

Labarthe-sur-Lèze (French pronunciation: [labaʁt syʁ lɛz], literally Labarthe on Lèze; Occitan: La Barta de Lesat) is a commune in the Haute-Garonne department in southwestern France.

== Geography ==
The Lèze forms part of the commune's southern border, flows northward through the eastern part of the commune, then flows into the Ariège, which forms the commune's northeastern border.

== Population ==
Historical population

Year	Pop.	±% p.a.
1793	422	—
1800	426	+0.13%
1806	428	+0.08%
1821	563	+1.84%
1831	549	−0.25%
1836	575	+0.93%
1841	547	−0.99%
1846	609	+2.17%
1851	605	−0.13%
1856	587	−0.60%
1861	584	−0.10%
1866	575	−0.31%
1872	523	−1.57%
1876	514	−0.43%
1881	531	+0.65%
1886	549	+0.67%
1891	544	−0.18%
1896	535	−0.33%
1901	515	−0.76%

Year	Pop.	±% p.a.
1906	538	+0.88%
1911	509	−1.10%
1921	500	−0.18%
1926	503	+0.12%
1931	507	+0.16%
1936	477	−1.21%
1946	460	−0.36%
1954	527	+1.71%
1962	518	−0.22%
1968	810	+7.74%
1975	1,672	+10.91%
1982	2,110	+3.38%
1990	3,772	+7.53%
1999	4,632	+2.31%
2007	4,740	+0.29%
2012	5,059	+1.31%
2017	6,178	+4.08%
2023	6,585	+1.07%

Source: EHESS and INSEE (1968-2023)

== Twin towns ==
Labarthe-sur-Lèze is twinned with:

- Breda di Piave, Italy

== See also ==
Communes of the Haute-Garonne department
