= Artix =

Artix may refer to:

- Artix, Ariège, a commune in France
- Artix, Pyrénées-Atlantiques, a commune in France
- Artix ESB, software product of IONA Technologies
- Artix Entertainment, an independent video game developer
- Artix Linux, a Linux distribution
- Xilinx Artix, a family of FPGA integrated circuits by Xilinx (now AMD)
