= Clermont-le-Fort =

- Commune
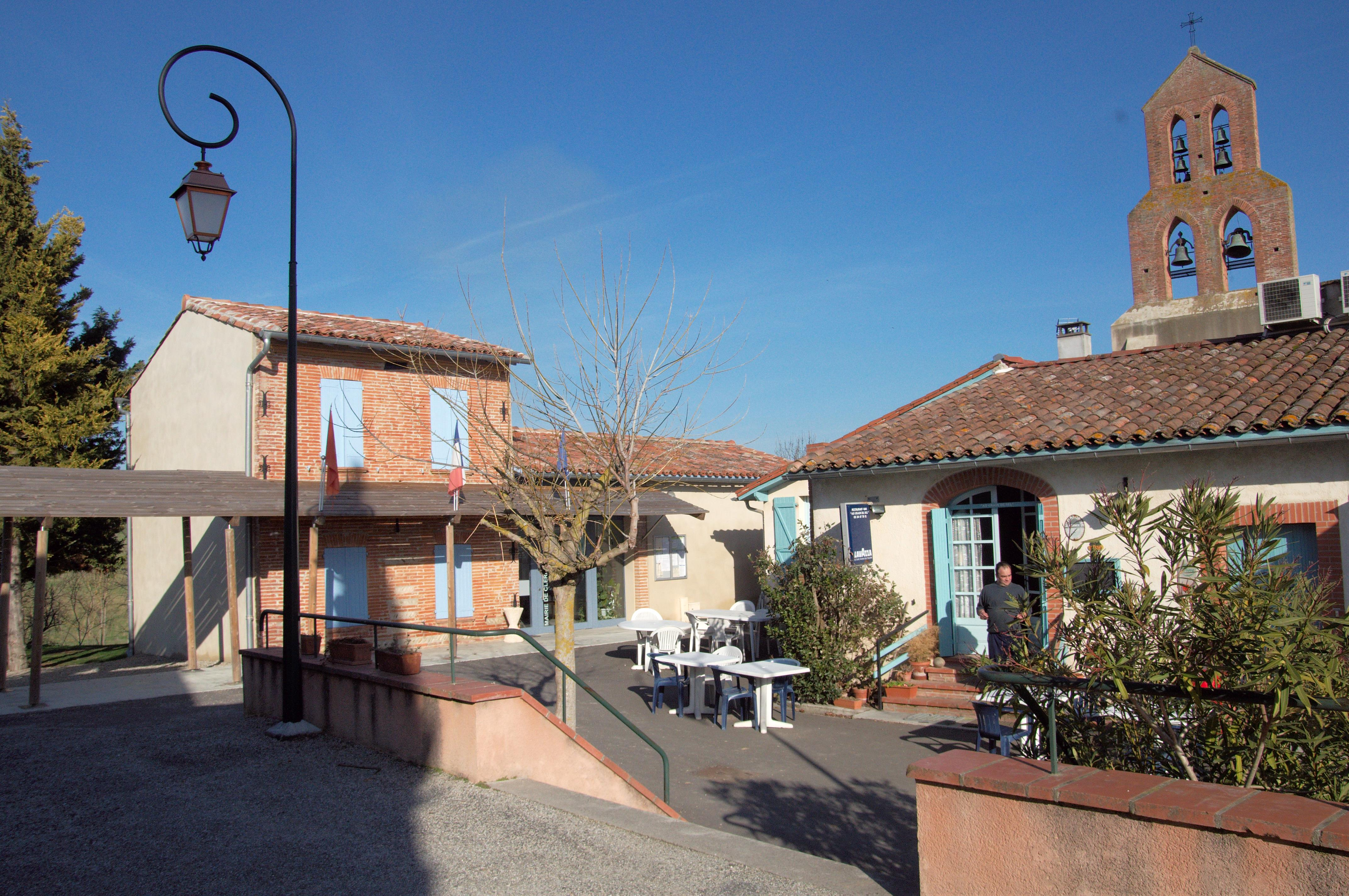
- Town hall

- Coat of arms
- Location of Clermont-le-Fort
- Location within France Location within Occitanie
- Coordinates: 43°27′32″N 1°26′00″E
- Country: France
- Region: Occitania
- Department: Haute-Garonne
- Arrondissement: Toulouse
- Canton: Castanet-Tolosan
- Intercommunality: CA Sicoval

Government
  - Mayor (2020–2026): Élisabeth Giachetto
- Area^{1}: 10.04 km^{2} (3.88 sq mi)
- Elevation: 240 m (790 ft)
- Highest elevation: 282 m (925 ft)
- Lowest elevation: 152 m (499 ft)
- Population (2023): 531
  - Density: 52.9/km^{2} (137/sq mi)
- Time zone: UTC+01:00 (CET)
  - Summer (DST): UTC+02:00 (CEST)
- INSEE/Postal code: 31148 /31810
- ^{1} French Land Register data, which excludes lakes, ponds, glaciers > 1 km^{2} (0.386 sq mi or 247 acres) and river estuaries.

Clermont-le-Fort (French pronunciation: [klɛʁmɔ̃ lə fɔʁ]; Occitan: Clarmont) is a commune in the Haute-Garonne department in southwestern France.

== Geography ==
The Ariège forms most of the commune's western border, with the Lèze, one of its tributaries, which flows here into the Ariège.

== Population ==
Historical population
Year	Pop.	±% p.a.
1968	242	—
1975	250	+0.47%
1982	308	+3.03%
1990	359	+1.93%
1999	464	+2.89%
2007	496	+0.84%
2012	534	+1.49%
2017	506	−1.07%
2023	531	+0.81%
Source: INSEE

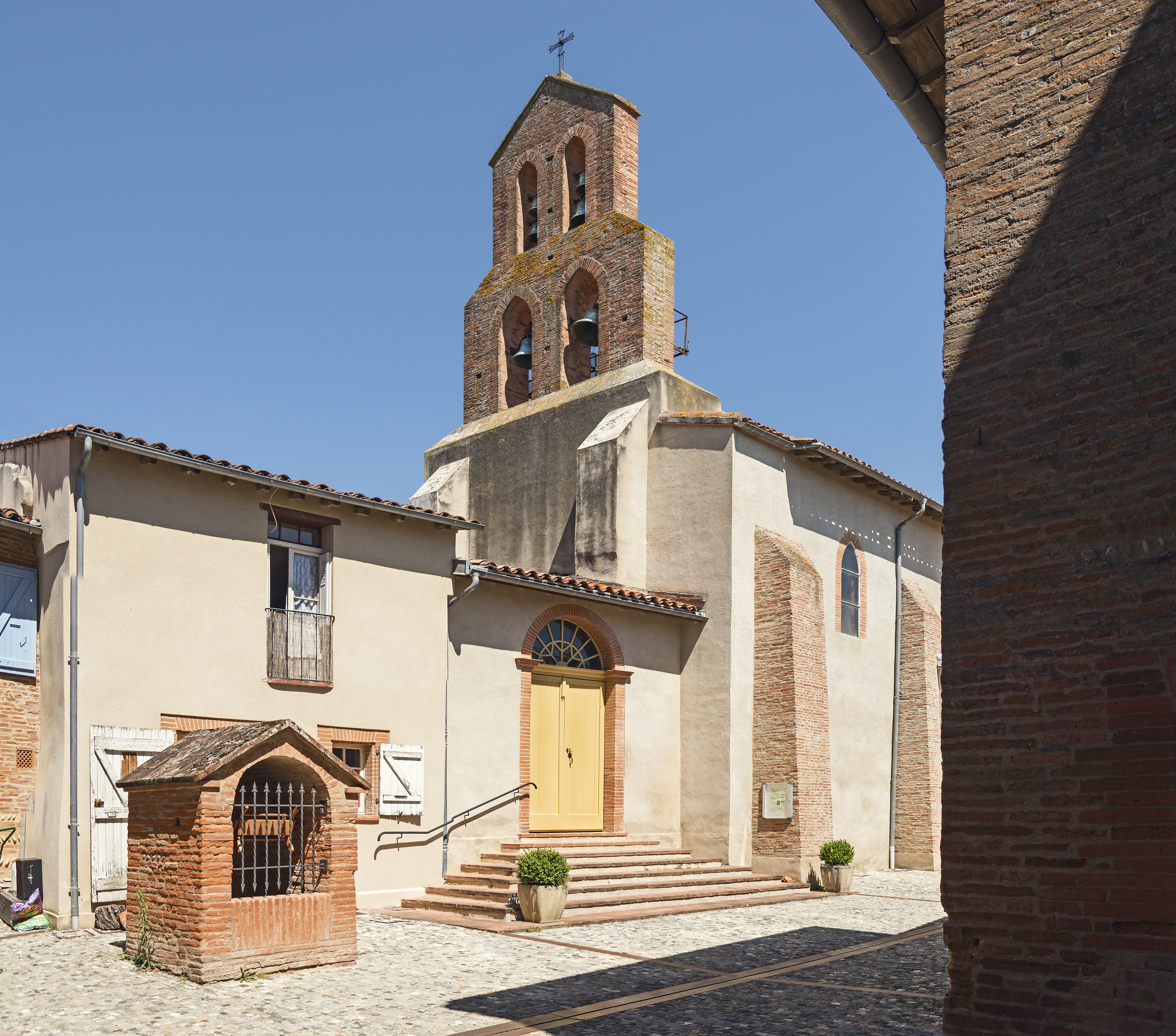
Church St Peter.

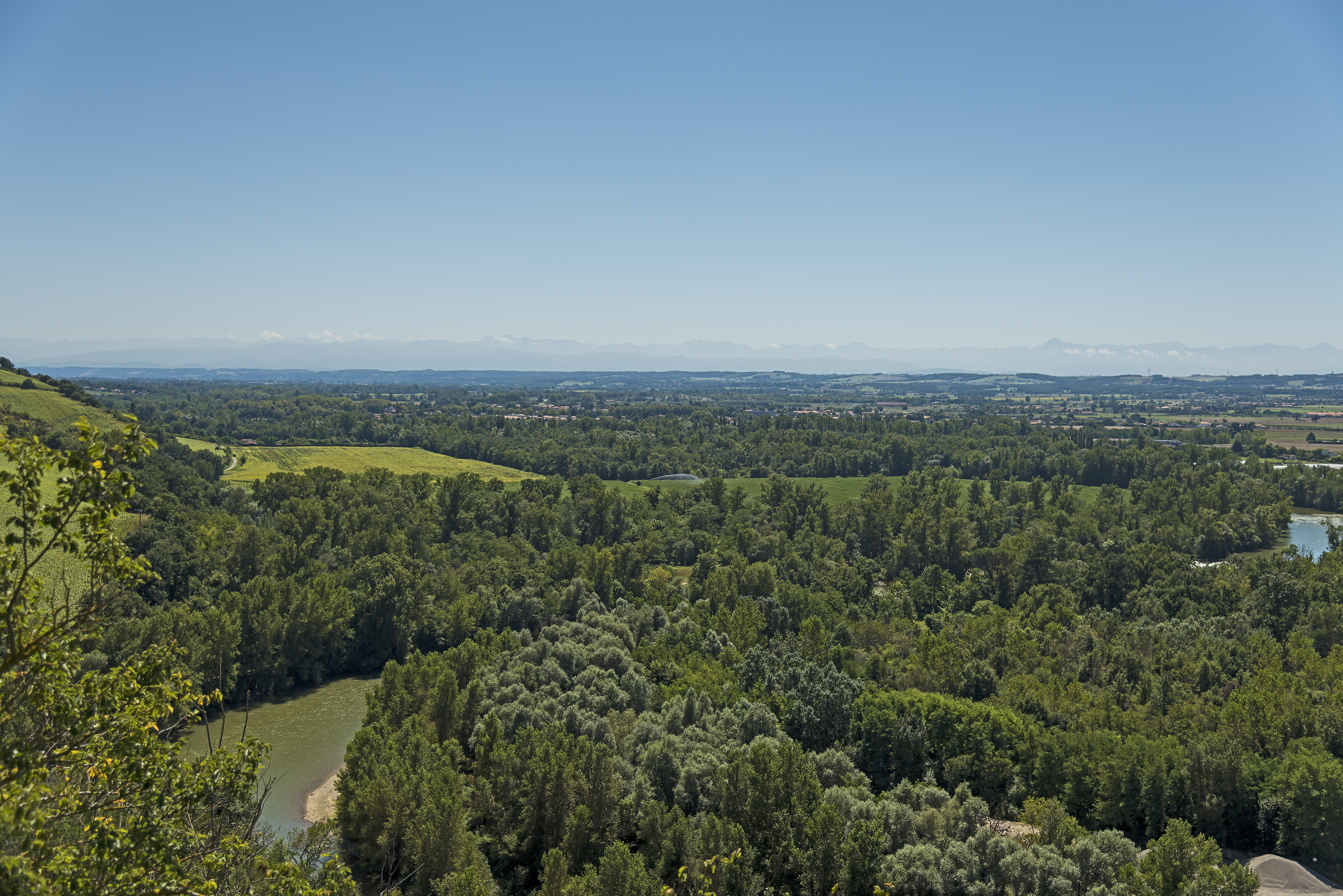
Panorama

== See also ==
- Communes of the Haute-Garonne department
