= Saint-Amans, Ariège =

Commune in Occitanie, France

Saint-Amans
- Part of Bézac
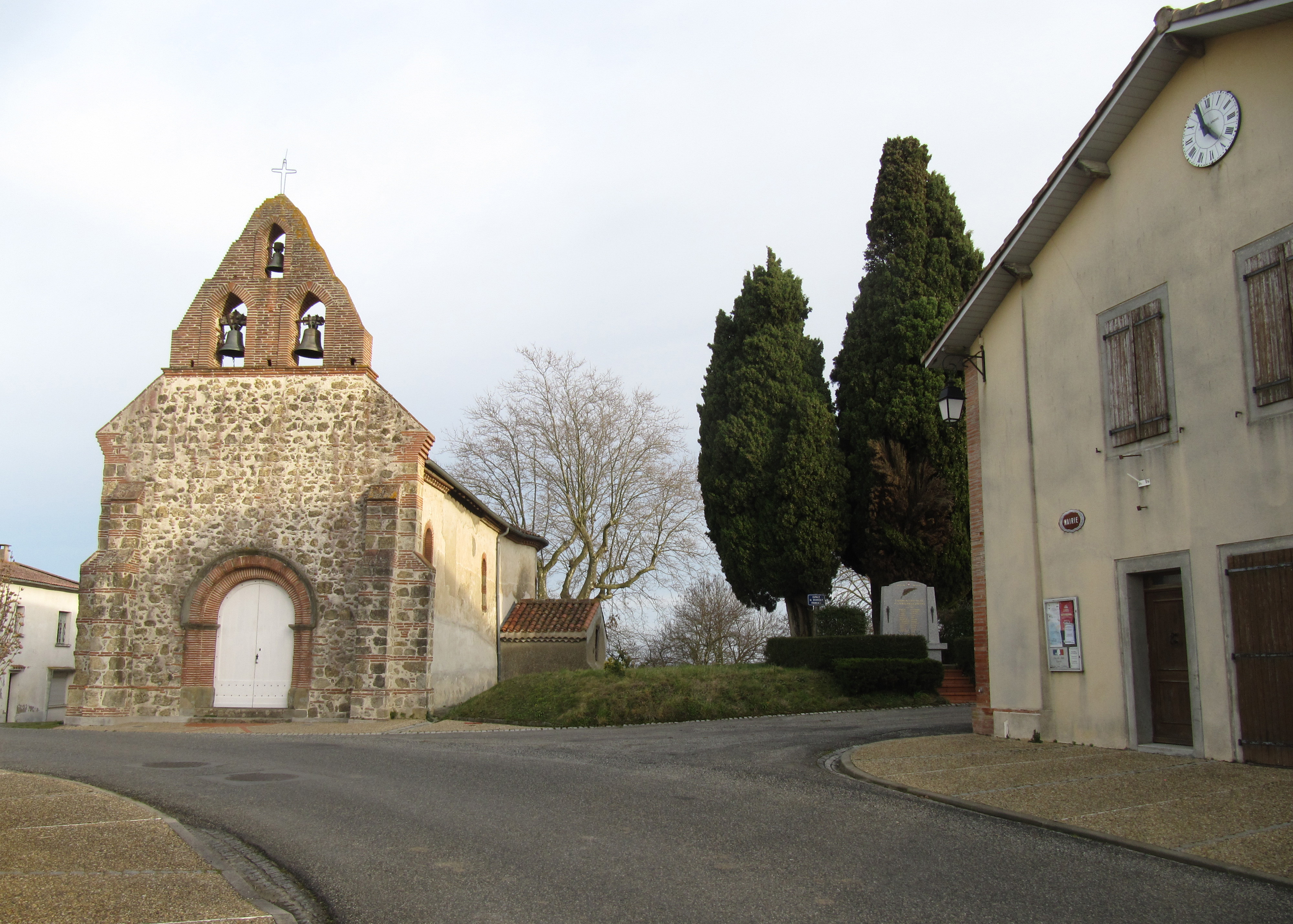
- Saint-Amans Town hall
- Location of Saint-Amans
- Location within France Location within Occitanie
- Coordinates: 43°09′27″N 1°32′54″E
- Country: France
- Region: Occitania
- Department: Ariège
- Arrondissement: Pamiers
- Canton: Pamiers-1
- Commune: Bézac
- Area^{1}: 2.64 km^{2} (1.02 sq mi)
- Elevation: 387 m (1,270 ft)
- Highest elevation: 402 m (1,319 ft)
- Lowest elevation: 290 m (950 ft)
- Population (2021): 42
  - Density: 16/km^{2} (41/sq mi)
- Time zone: UTC+01:00 (CET)
  - Summer (DST): UTC+02:00 (CEST)
- Postal code: 09100
- ^{1} French Land Register data, which excludes lakes, ponds, glaciers > 1 km^{2} (0.386 sq mi or 247 acres) and river estuaries.

Saint-Amans (French pronunciation: [sɛ̃t‿amɑ̃]; Languedocien: Sent Amanç) is a former commune in the Ariège department in south-western France. It was merged, on 1 January 2023, into the commune of Bézac. Inhabitants are called Saint-Amanois in French.

== See also ==
- Communes of the Ariège department
