= Artix, Ariège =

Commune in Occitanie, France

Artix
- Commune
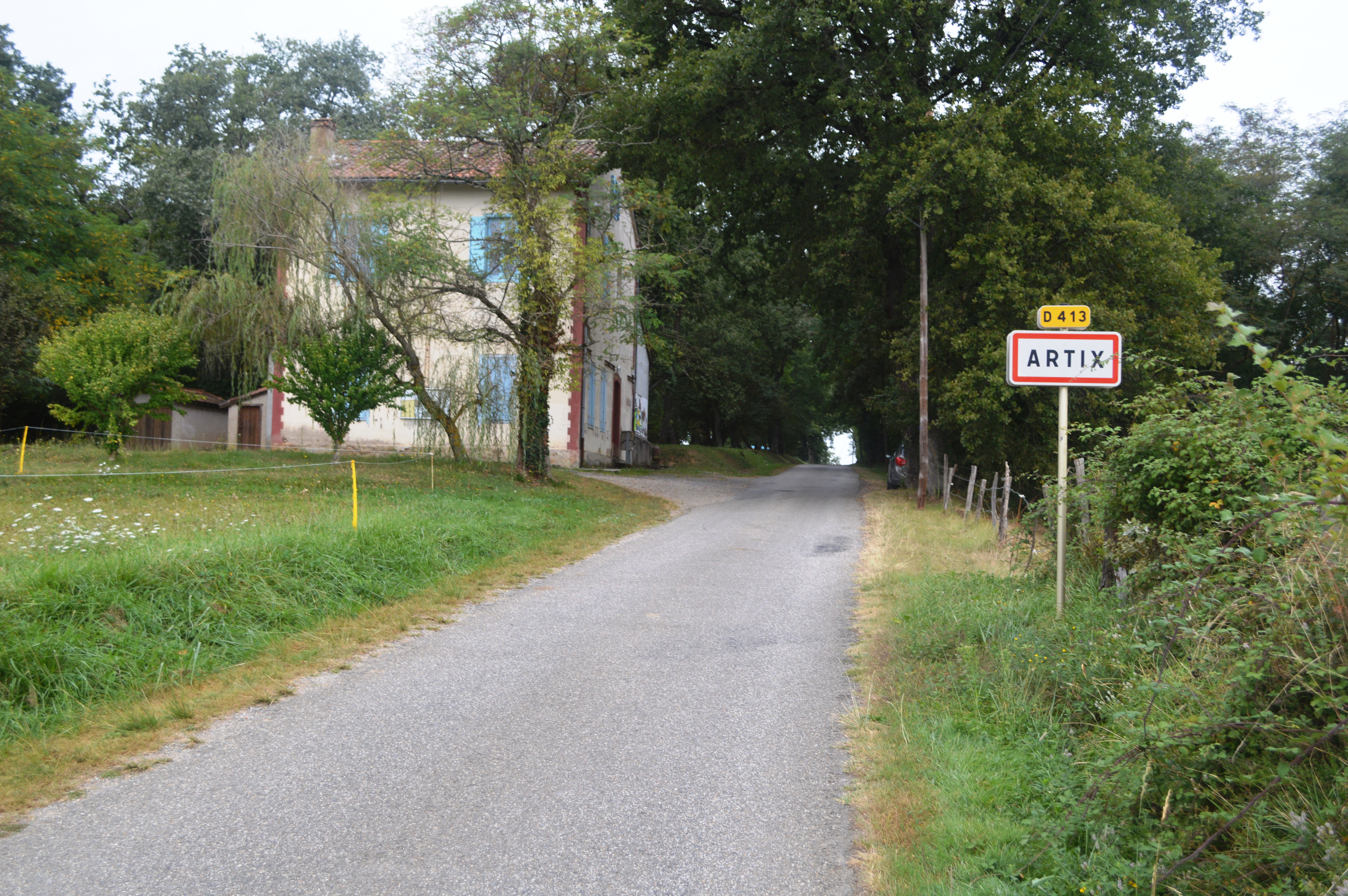
- The road into Artix
- Location of Artix
- Location within France Location within Occitanie
- Coordinates: 43°04′09″N 1°33′59″E
- Country: France
- Region: Occitania
- Department: Ariège
- Arrondissement: Foix
- Canton: Pamiers-1
- Intercommunality: CA Pays Foix-Varilhes

Government
  - Mayor (2020–2026): Michel Peruga
- Area^{1}: 7.35 km^{2} (2.84 sq mi)
- Elevation: 490 m (1,610 ft)
- Highest elevation: 701 m (2,300 ft)
- Lowest elevation: 337 m (1,106 ft)
- Population (2023): 113
  - Density: 15.4/km^{2} (39.8/sq mi)
- Time zone: UTC+01:00 (CET)
  - Summer (DST): UTC+02:00 (CEST)
- INSEE/Postal code: 09021 /09120
- ^{1} French Land Register data, which excludes lakes, ponds, glaciers > 1 km^{2} (0.386 sq mi or 247 acres) and river estuaries.

Artix is a commune in the Ariège department in the Occitanie region of south-western France.

== Geography ==
Artix is located some 7 km south-west of Pamiers and 4 km south of Saint-Victor-Rouzaud. Access to the commune is by the D13 road from Saint-Victor-Rouzaud in the north, passing through from the northern to the eastern edge of the commune and continuing to Rieux-de-Pelleport in the south-east. Access to the village is by the Souleille de Touron country road, branching off the D13, and going west to the village, and continuing west to join the D431. There is the hamlet of Le Prieu on the northern border of the commune. The commune is a mix of farmland and forest.

The Ruisseau de Babots rises in the north of the commune and flows north to join the Estrique. The Ruisseau de Grave forms the western border of the commune as it flows north-east to join the Estrique. The Ruisseau d'Artix rises in the south of the commune and flows north-east, gathering tributaries that continue east to join the Ariège near Rieux-de-Pelleport.

== History ==
The village of Artix seems to be old as it was apparently present in 960 in the will of the Bishop of Toulouse (Hugues). The French Wars of Religion ravaged the commune: in 1562 the Protestants pillaged crops. The church was also destroyed. Finally in 1621 the Baron of Léran plundered the Chateau of Artix.

== Administration ==
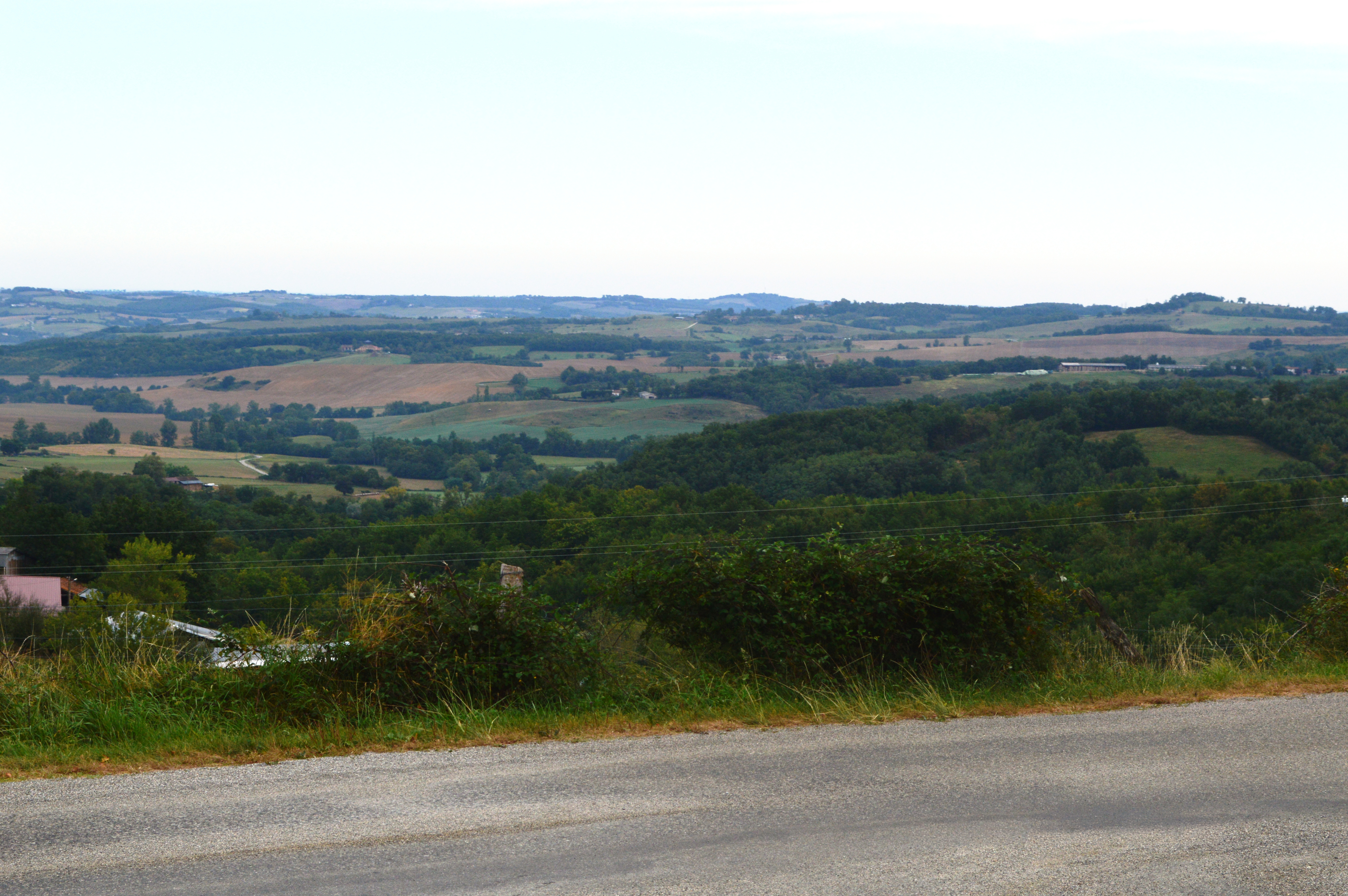
General View of Artix

List of Successive Mayors

From	To	Name
2001	2020	André Eychenne
2020	2026	Michel Peruga

== Demography ==
The inhabitants of the commune are known as Articois or Articoises in French.

Historical population

Year	Pop.	±% p.a.
1793	155	—
1821	212	+1.12%
1846	212	+0.00%
1872	204	−0.15%
1901	164	−0.75%
1926	128	−0.99%
1946	93	−1.58%
1962	71	−1.67%
1968	60	−2.77%

Year	Pop.	±% p.a.
1975	53	−1.76%
1982	72	+4.47%
1990	70	−0.35%
1999	91	+2.96%
2007	100	+1.19%
2012	130	+5.39%
2017	141	+1.64%
2023	113	−3.62%

Source: EHESS and INSEE

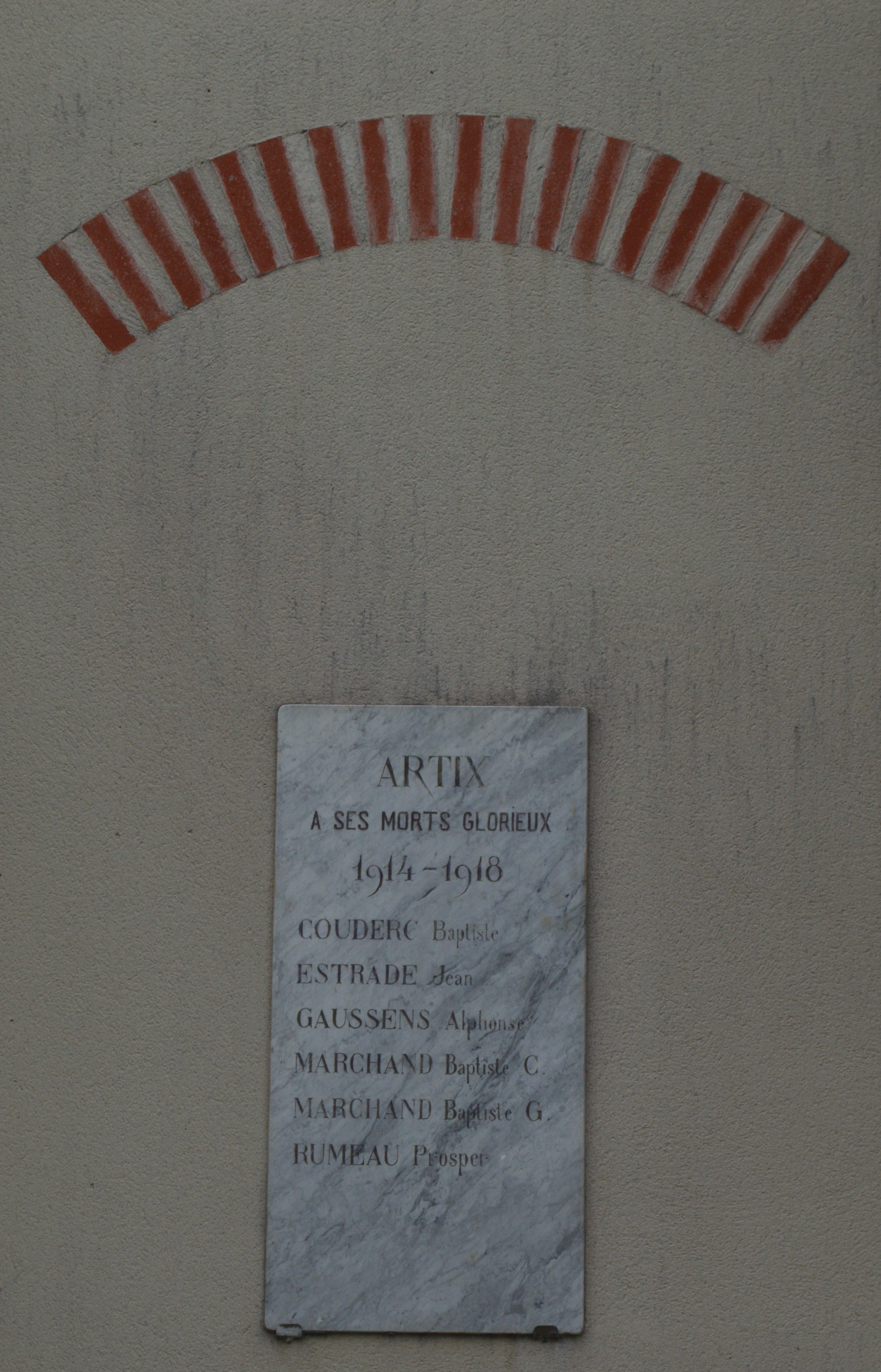
Artix War Memorial

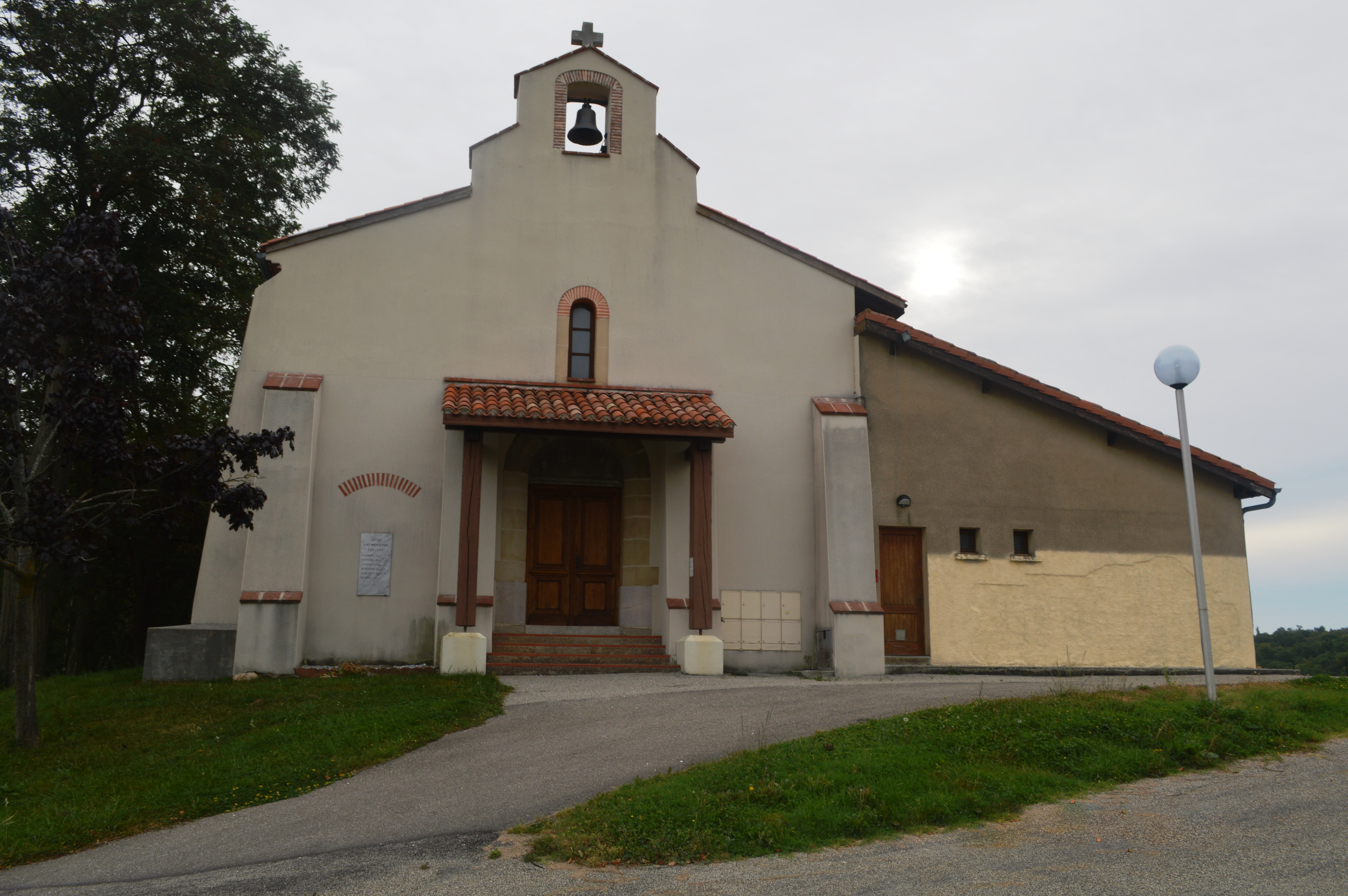
Artix Church

== See also ==
- Communes of the Ariège department
