= Vernet =

Vernet is a surname. Notable people with the surname include:

== Painters ==
- Antoine Vernet (1689-1753), French painter, father of Claude Joseph Vernet
- Claude Joseph Vernet (1714–1789), French painter
- Antoine Charles Horace Vernet (1758–1835), also known as Carle Vernet, French painter, the son of Claude Joseph Vernet
- Emile Jean Horace Vernet (1789–1863), French painter, the son of Antoine Charles Horace Vernet

== Other ==
- Daniel Vernet (c. 1945–2018), French journalist
- Helen Vernet (1876–1956), British gambler
- Jacob Vernet (1698–1789), Swiss theologian
- José María Vernet (1944–2024), Argentine politician
- Louis Vernet (archer) (1870–1946), French Olympic athlete
- Luis Vernet (1791–1871), Appointed Military and Civil Commander of Puerto Luis (1829–1832) by the Republic of Buenos Aires
- Marie Vernet (1825–1898), French fashion model

== See also ==
- Le Vernet (disambiguation)
- Vernet, Haute-Garonne, a commune in France
