= Lagardelle-sur-Lèze =

- Commune
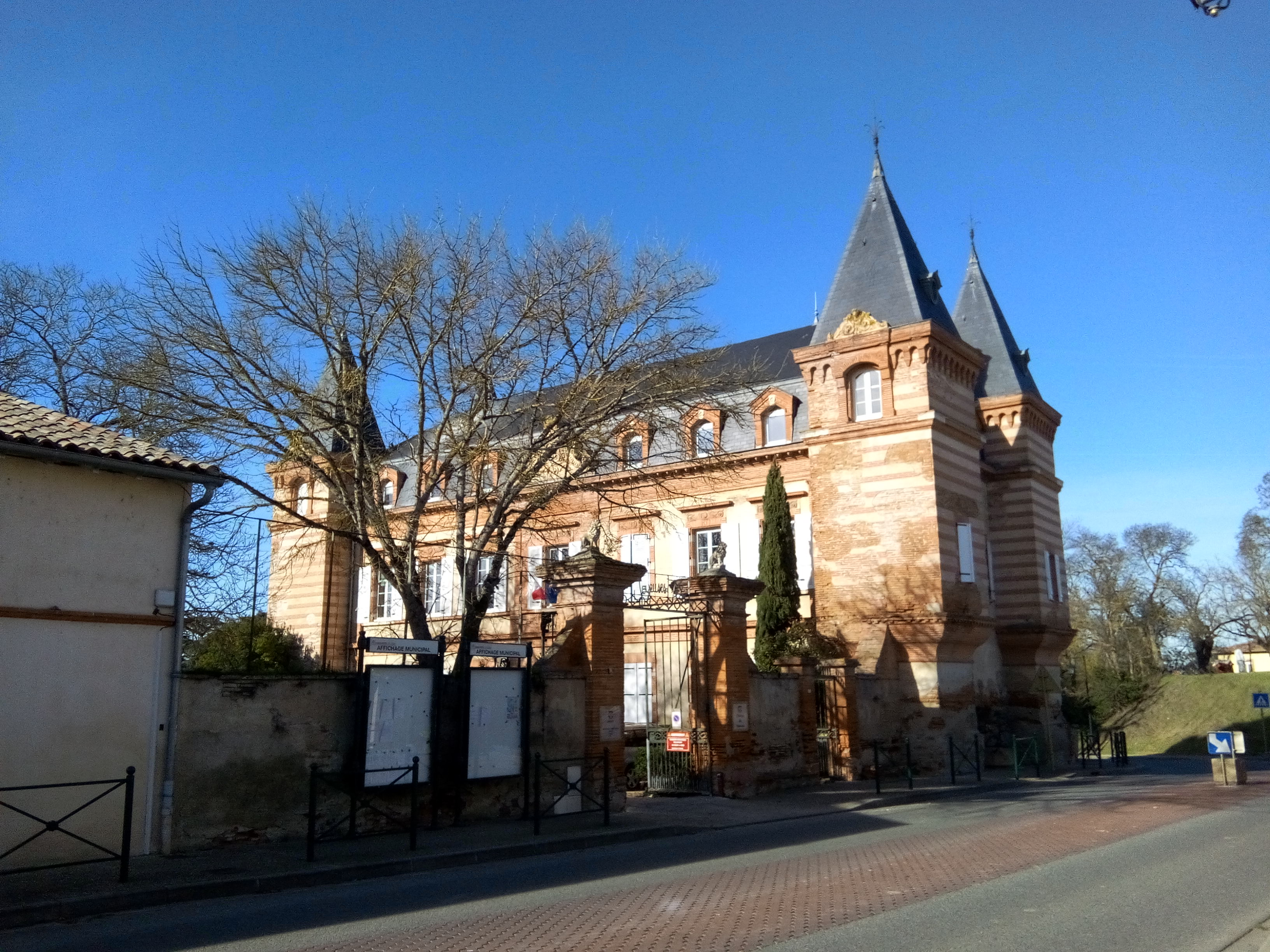
- The chateau of Vignaou in Lagardelle-sur-Lèze

- Coat of arms
- Location of Lagardelle-sur-Lèze
- Location within France Location within Occitanie
- Coordinates: 43°24′46″N 1°23′21″E
- Country: France
- Region: Occitania
- Department: Haute-Garonne
- Arrondissement: Muret
- Canton: Portet-sur-Garonne

Government
  - Mayor (2020–2026): Floréal Munoz
- Area^{1}: 13.78 km^{2} (5.32 sq mi)
- Elevation: 183 m (600 ft)
- Highest elevation: 217 m (712 ft)
- Lowest elevation: 167 m (548 ft)
- Population (2023): 3,303
  - Density: 239.7/km^{2} (620.8/sq mi)
- Time zone: UTC+01:00 (CET)
  - Summer (DST): UTC+02:00 (CEST)
- INSEE/Postal code: 31263 /31870
- ^{1} French Land Register data, which excludes lakes, ponds, glaciers > 1 km^{2} (0.386 sq mi or 247 acres) and river estuaries.

Lagardelle-sur-Lèze (French pronunciation: [laɡaʁdɛl syʁ lɛz], literally Lagardelle on Lèze; Occitan: La Gardèla de Lesa) is a commune in the Haute-Garonne department in southwestern France.

== Population ==
The inhabitants of the commune are called Lagardellois in French.

Historical population
Year	Pop.	±% p.a.
1968	610	—
1975	914	+5.95%
1982	1,139	+3.19%
1990	1,823	+6.06%
1999	2,181	+2.01%
2007	2,449	+1.46%
2012	2,528	+0.64%
2017	3,045	+3.79%
2023	3,303	+1.36%
Source: INSEE

== Twinning ==
The village was twinned with Bassano in Teverina in Italy.

== Geography ==
The Lèze flows northeast through the middle of the commune and crosses town.

== See also ==
Communes of the Haute-Garonne department
