= Lèze =

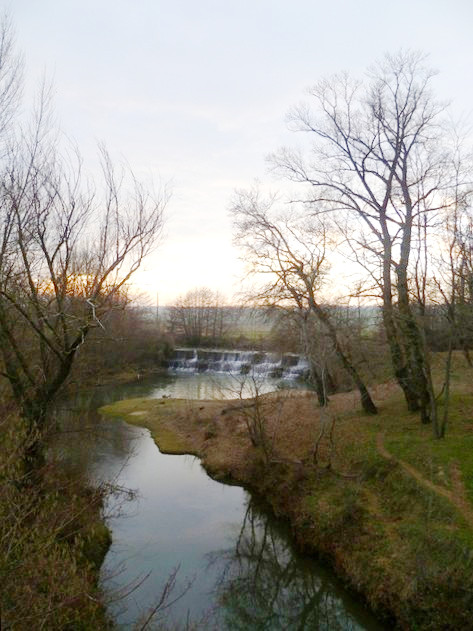
- The Lèze in Beaumont-sur-Lèze

- Location within France Location within Occitanie

Location
- Country: France
- Region: Occitanie

Physical characteristics
- Source
  - location: La Bastide-de-Sérou
  - coordinates: 43°02′02″N 01°29′03″E
  - elevation: 570 m (1,870 ft)
- Mouth
  - location: Ariège
  - coordinates: 43°27′48″N 01°25′07″E
  - elevation: 155 m (509 ft)
- Length: 70.2 km (43.6 mi)
- Basin size: 351 km^{2} (136 sq mi)
- Discharge
  - average: 2.01 m^{3}/s (71 cu ft/s)

Basin features
- Progression: Ariège→ Garonne→ Gironde estuary→ Atlantic Ocean

The Lèze (French pronunciation: ['lɛzə]) is a 70.2 km (43.6 mi) long river in the Ariège and Haute-Garonne départements, southwestern France. Its source is in La Bastide-de-Sérou. It flows generally north. It is a left tributary of the Ariège into which it flows between Labarthe-sur-Lèze and Clermont-le-Fort.

== Départements and communes along its course ==
This list is ordered from source to mouth:

- Ariège: La Bastide-de-Sérou, Aigues-Juntes, Gabre, Montégut-Plantaurel, Monesple, Pailhès, Artigat, Le Fossat, Sainte-Suzanne, Saint-Ybars
- Haute-Garonne: Massabrac, Castagnac
- Ariège: Lézat-sur-Lèze
- Haute-Garonne: Saint-Sulpice-sur-Lèze, Montaut, Beaumont-sur-Lèze, Lagardelle-sur-Lèze, Vernet, Labarthe-sur-Lèze, Clermont-le-Fort
