= Berthe de Puybusque =

French poet and novelist (1848–1926)

- Born: 14 December 1848; Muret, France
- Died: 12 November 1926 (aged 77); Saint-Sulpice-sur-Lèze, France

1918 French magazine with Berther's L'arme du fou novel published

Berthe de Puybusque (pen name, Rustica; 14 December 1848 – 12 November 1926) was a French female poet and novelist born in Muret (Haute-Garonne).

== Biography ==
Berthe Marie Barthélemine de Puybusque, born at Château de Lacombe in Muret (Haute-Garonne) on 14 December 1848, published her first works under the pseudonym Rustica. Crowned as a master of Jeux Floraux in Toulouse, she wrote novels intended for young girls as well as poems. She also collaborated with L'Ouvrier, an illustrated bi-weekly journal. She died in Saint-Sulpice-sur-Lèze (Haute-Garonne) on 12 November 1926.

== Works ==
- Labeur sans gloire; Hirt & Cie, 1920
- Pascalette; Hirt & Cie, 1923
- Gina la blonde; Hirt & Cie, 1929
- L'équivoque; Gautier-Languereau, 1926
- Leçon des choses, a collection of poems. Ollendorf, 1894 (under her pseudonym Rustica)
- Les deux robes, a novel. Gautier, 1902.
- La bête hombrée, a novel. Perpignan, Latrobe, 1902.
- L'Angélus sur les champs, poetry, with a preface by Mr. Charles de Pomairols (L' me latine). Toulouse, 1907.
- Marie de Renaud, a novel. Gautier, 1910.
- L'arme du fou, a novel. Paris, 1912.
- Le Rosaire, a collection of verses, with a foreword by Mr. Ch. de Pomairols. Besançon, Imprimerie de l'Est, 1912.
- Les Lointains s'éclairent, a novel. Gautier, 1912.
- Moisson, an idyll that received an accolade at the Jeux floraux
- Eulogy of Clémence Isaure delivered by Berthe de Puybusque, Master of the Floral games.

== Legacy ==
An alleyway in Muret bears her name.

== Sources ==
- Gérard Walsh, Poets of Yesterday and Today Notice, followed by Le premier papillon and Peur (from the collection L'angélus sur les champs)
- Genealogy of the Puybusque family, by Guillaume-Albert de Puybusque; E. Privat (Toulouse), 1912; read online on Gallica; also see pages 211, 239, 329.
