= Bézac =

Commune in Occitanie, France

- Commune
- Location of Bézac
- Location within France Location within Occitanie
- Coordinates: 43°08′57″N 1°34′33″E
- Country: France
- Region: Occitania
- Department: Ariège
- Arrondissement: Pamiers
- Canton: Pamiers-1
- Intercommunality: CC des Portes d'Ariège Pyrénées

Government
  - Mayor (2020–2026): Jean-Paul Chabé
- Area^{1}: 13.63 km^{2} (5.26 sq mi)
- Elevation: 287 m (942 ft)
- Highest elevation: 390 m (1,280 ft)
- Lowest elevation: 248 m (814 ft)
- Population (2023): 485
  - Density: 35.6/km^{2} (92.2/sq mi)
- Time zone: UTC+01:00 (CET)
  - Summer (DST): UTC+02:00 (CEST)
- INSEE/Postal code: 09056 /09100
- ^{1} French Land Register data, which excludes lakes, ponds, glaciers > 1 km^{2} (0.386 sq mi or 247 acres) and river estuaries.

Bézac (French pronunciation: [bezak]; Occitan: Vesac) is a commune in the Ariège department of southwestern France. On 1 January 2023, the former commune of Saint-Amans was merged into Bézac.

== Population ==
Population data refer to the commune in its geography as of January 2025.

Historical population
Year	Pop.	±% p.a.
1968	195	—
1975	202	+0.51%
1982	218	+1.09%
1990	252	+1.83%
1999	275	+0.98%
2007	320	+1.91%
2012	353	+1.98%
2017	403	+2.68%
2023	485	+3.14%
Source: INSEE

== See also ==
- Communes of the Ariège department
