= Le Vernet-Chaméane =

- Commune
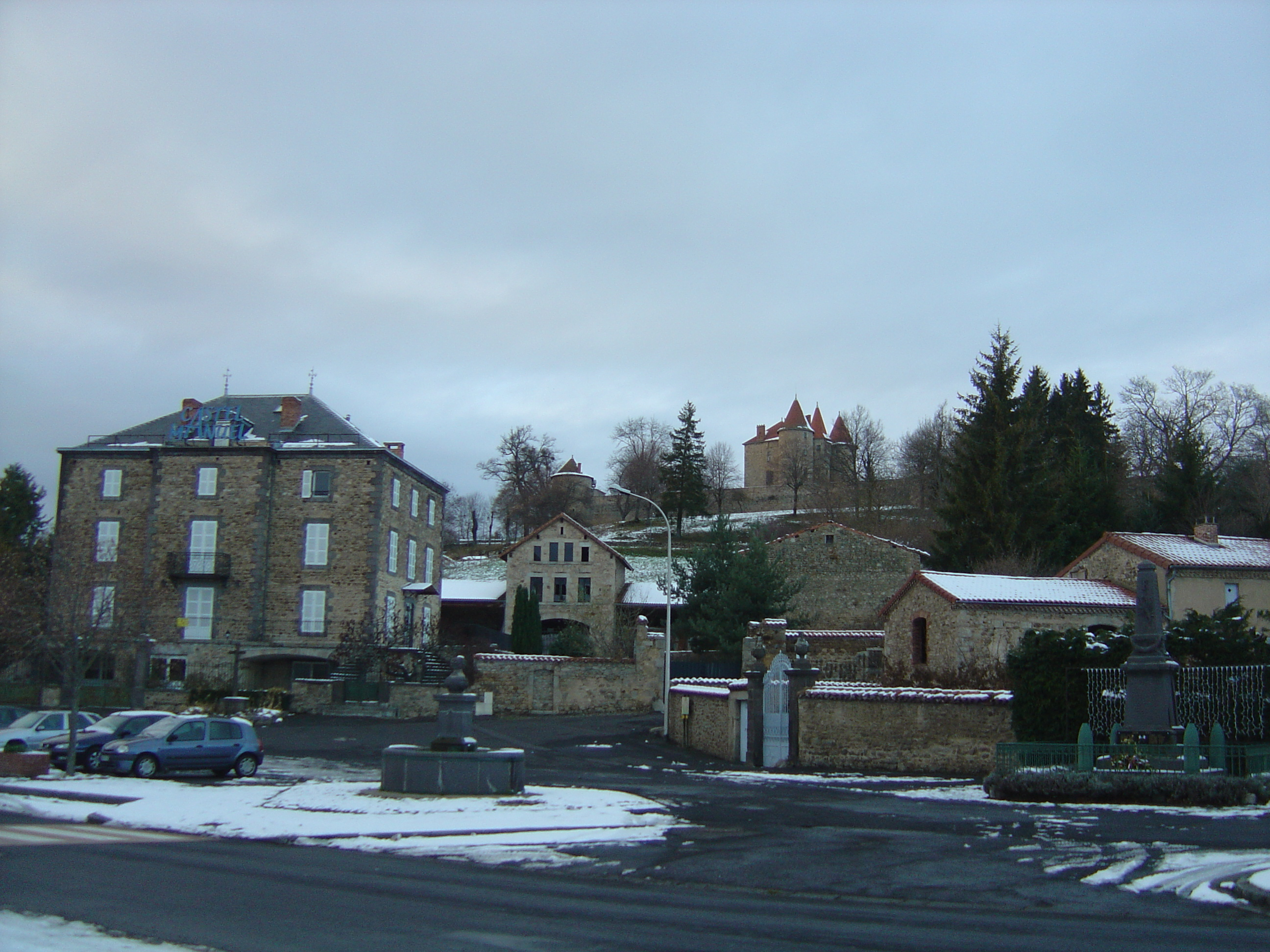
- The centre of Vernet-la-Varenne
- Location of Le Vernet-Chaméane
- Location within France Location within Auvergne-Rhône-Alpes
- Coordinates: 45°28′30″N 3°27′07″E
- Country: France
- Region: Auvergne-Rhône-Alpes
- Department: Puy-de-Dôme
- Arrondissement: Issoire
- Canton: Brassac-les-Mines
- Intercommunality: Agglo Pays d'Issoire

Government
  - Mayor (2026–32): Marc Hosmalin
- Area^{1}: 46.01 km^{2} (17.76 sq mi)
- Highest elevation: 1,051 m (3,448 ft)
- Lowest elevation: 542 m (1,778 ft)
- Population (2023): 775
  - Density: 16.8/km^{2} (43.6/sq mi)
- Time zone: UTC+01:00 (CET)
  - Summer (DST): UTC+02:00 (CEST)
- INSEE/Postal code: 63448 /63580
- ^{1} French Land Register data, which excludes lakes, ponds, glaciers > 1 km^{2} (0.386 sq mi or 247 acres) and river estuaries.

Le Vernet-Chaméane (French pronunciation: [lə vɛʁnɛ ʃamean]; Auvergnat: Le Vernet e Chameana) is a commune in the Puy-de-Dôme department in Auvergne in central France. It was established on 1 January 2019 by merger of the former communes of Vernet-la-Varenne (the seat) and Chaméane.

== See also ==
- Communes of the Puy-de-Dôme department
