= Monesple =

Commune in Occitanie, France

- Commune
- Location of Monesple
- Location within France Location within Occitanie
- Coordinates: 43°06′05″N 1°27′55″E
- Country: France
- Region: Occitania
- Department: Ariège
- Arrondissement: Saint-Girons
- Canton: Arize-Lèze

Government
  - Mayor (2020–2026): Colette Rumeau
- Area^{1}: 6.09 km^{2} (2.35 sq mi)
- Elevation: 482 m (1,581 ft)
- Highest elevation: 532 m (1,745 ft)
- Lowest elevation: 302 m (991 ft)
- Population (2023): 26
  - Density: 4.3/km^{2} (11/sq mi)
- Time zone: UTC+01:00 (CET)
  - Summer (DST): UTC+02:00 (CEST)
- INSEE/Postal code: 09195 /09130
- ^{1} French Land Register data, which excludes lakes, ponds, glaciers > 1 km^{2} (0.386 sq mi or 247 acres) and river estuaries.

Monesple is a commune in the Ariège department in southwestern France.

== Geography ==
The Lèze forms the commune's southwestern border.

== Population ==
Historical population
Year	Pop.	±% p.a.
1968	42	—
1975	36	−2.18%
1982	20	−8.05%
1990	17	−2.01%
1999	26	+4.83%
2007	26	+0.00%
2012	23	−2.42%
2017	27	+3.26%
2023	26	−0.63%
Source: INSEE

== See also ==
- Communes of the Ariège department
