= Chaméane =

Commune in Puy-de-Dôme, France

- Part of Le Vernet-Chaméane
- Location of Chaméane
- Location within France Location within Auvergne-Rhône-Alpes
- Coordinates: 45°30′51″N 3°27′07″E
- Country: France
- Region: Auvergne-Rhône-Alpes
- Department: Puy-de-Dôme
- Arrondissement: Issoire
- Canton: Brassac-les-Mines
- Commune: Le Vernet-Chaméane
- Area^{1}: 10.91 km^{2} (4.21 sq mi)
- Elevation: 815 m (2,674 ft)
- Highest elevation: 845 m (2,772 ft)
- Lowest elevation: 550 m (1,800 ft)
- Population (2022): 159
  - Density: 14.6/km^{2} (37.7/sq mi)
- Time zone: UTC+01:00 (CET)
  - Summer (DST): UTC+02:00 (CEST)
- Postal code: 63580
- ^{1} French Land Register data, which excludes lakes, ponds, glaciers > 1 km^{2} (0.386 sq mi or 247 acres) and river estuaries.

Chaméane (French pronunciation: [ʃamean]; Auvergnat: Chameana) is a former commune in the Puy-de-Dôme department in Auvergne-Rhône-Alpes in central France. It is in the canton of Brassac-les-Mines. On 1 January 2019, it was merged into the new commune Le Vernet-Chaméane.

== See also ==
- Communes of the Puy-de-Dôme department
