= Saint-Martin-d'Oydes =

Commune in Occitanie, France

- Commune
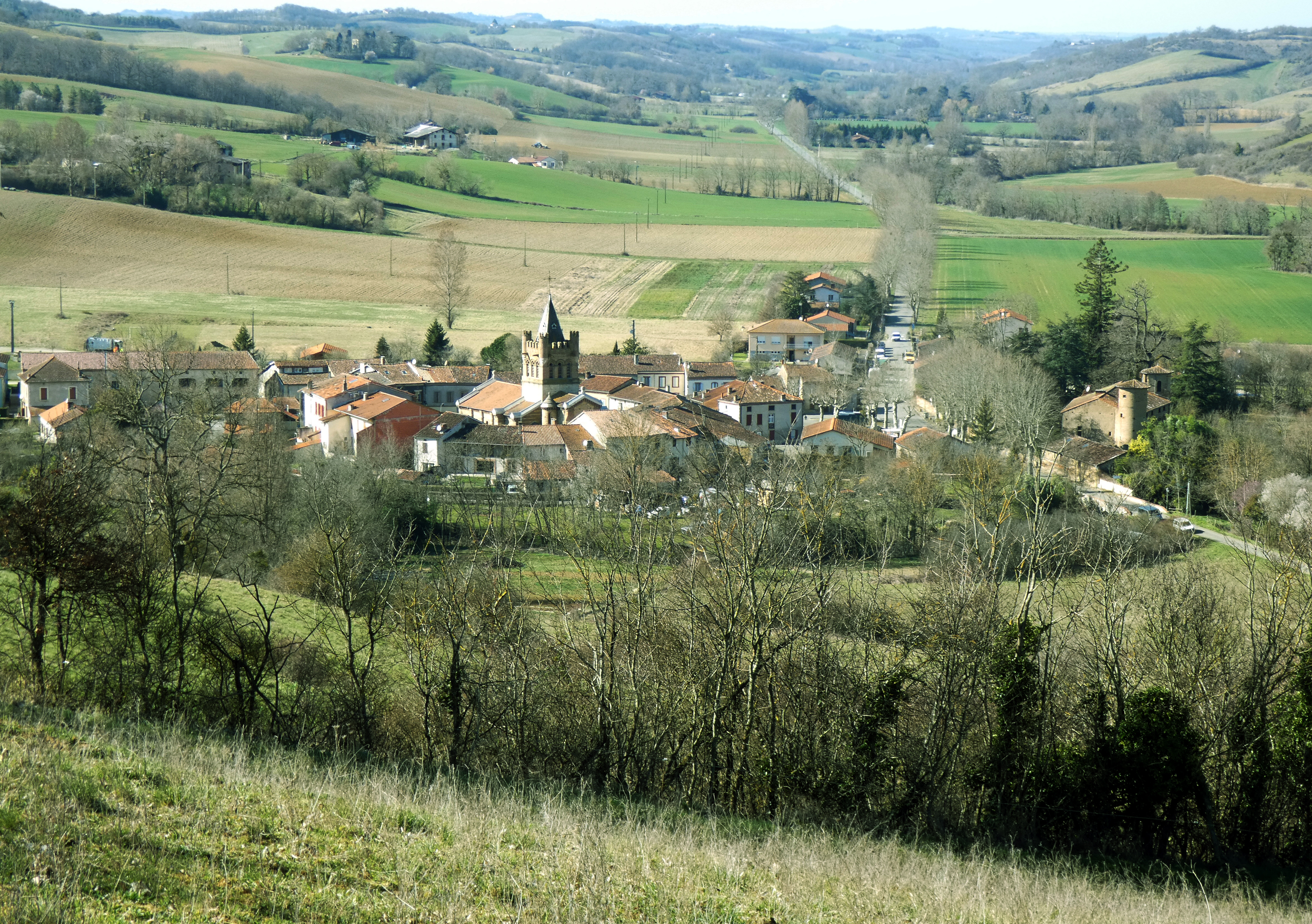
- Location of Saint-Martin-d'Oydes
- Location within France Location within Occitanie
- Coordinates: 43°10′16″N 1°29′49″E
- Country: France
- Region: Occitania
- Department: Ariège
- Arrondissement: Pamiers
- Canton: Pamiers-1

Government
  - Mayor (2020–2026): Geneviève Leleu
- Area^{1}: 11.64 km^{2} (4.49 sq mi)
- Elevation: 232 m (761 ft)
- Highest elevation: 381 m (1,250 ft)
- Lowest elevation: 259 m (850 ft)
- Population (2023): 250
  - Density: 21/km^{2} (56/sq mi)
- Time zone: UTC+01:00 (CET)
  - Summer (DST): UTC+02:00 (CEST)
- INSEE/Postal code: 09270 /09100
- ^{1} French Land Register data, which excludes lakes, ponds, glaciers > 1 km^{2} (0.386 sq mi or 247 acres) and river estuaries.

Saint-Martin-d'Oydes (French pronunciation: [sɛ̃ maʁtɛ̃ dɔjd]; Languedocien: Sent Martin d'Òidas) is a commune in the Ariège department in southwestern France.

== Population ==
Inhabitants of Saint-Martin-d'Oydes are called Saint-Martinains in French.

Historical population
Year	Pop.	±% p.a.
1968	310	—
1975	225	−4.47%
1982	218	−0.45%
1990	195	−1.38%
1999	225	+1.60%
2007	248	+1.22%
2012	269	+1.64%
2017	226	−3.42%
2023	250	+1.70%
Source: INSEE

== See also ==
- Communes of the Ariège department
