= Madière =

Commune in Occitanie, France

- Commune
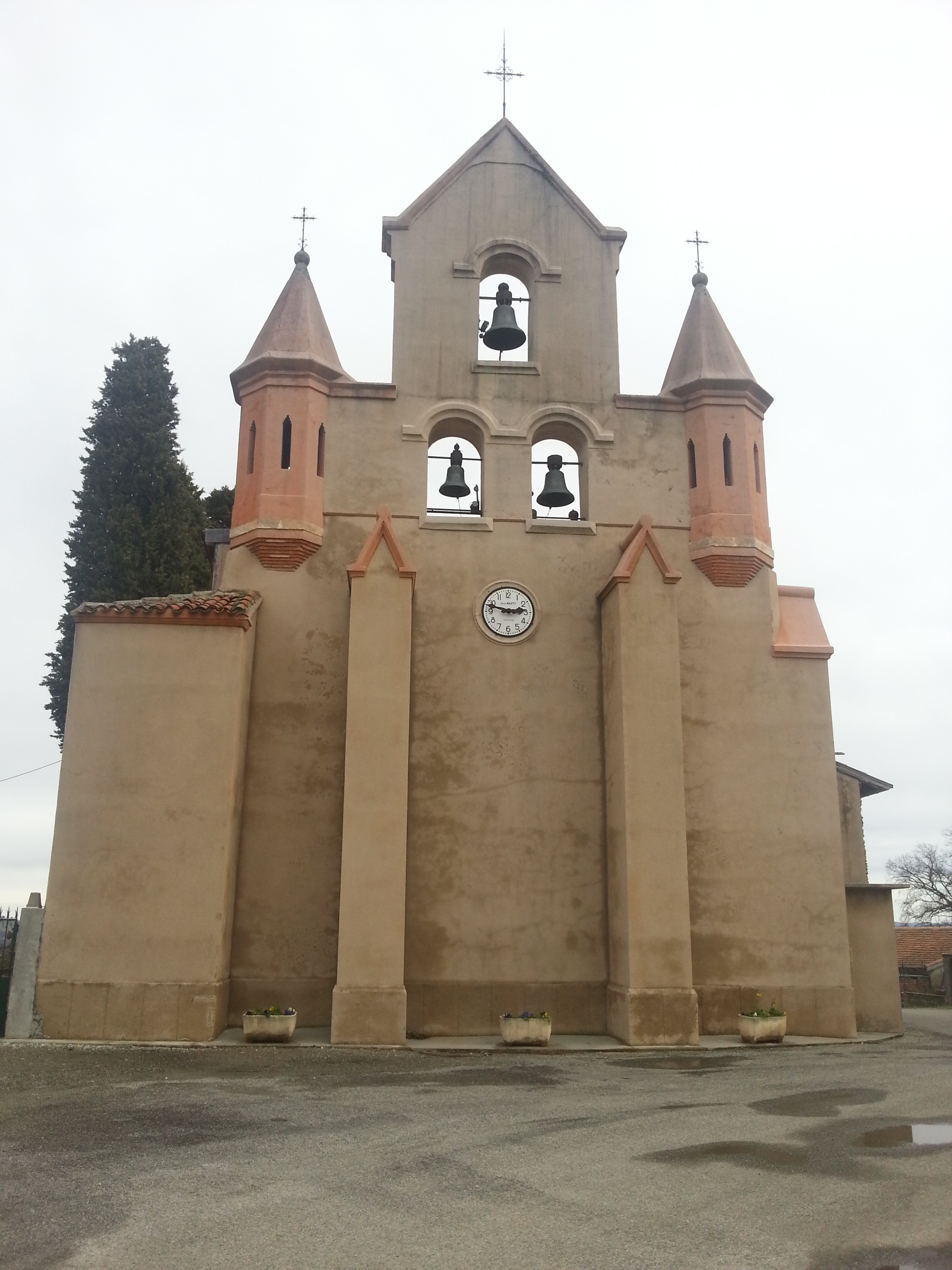
- The church in Madière

- Coat of arms
- Location of Madière
- Location within France Location within Occitanie
- Coordinates: 43°06′23″N 1°30′56″E
- Country: France
- Region: Occitania
- Department: Ariège
- Arrondissement: Pamiers
- Canton: Pamiers-1

Government
  - Mayor (2020–2026): Jean Dejean
- Area^{1}: 10.28 km^{2} (3.97 sq mi)
- Elevation: 422 m (1,385 ft)
- Highest elevation: 470 m (1,540 ft)
- Lowest elevation: 290 m (950 ft)
- Population (2023): 283
  - Density: 27.5/km^{2} (71.3/sq mi)
- Time zone: UTC+01:00 (CET)
  - Summer (DST): UTC+02:00 (CEST)
- INSEE/Postal code: 09177 /09100
- ^{1} French Land Register data, which excludes lakes, ponds, glaciers > 1 km^{2} (0.386 sq mi or 247 acres) and river estuaries.

Madière (French pronunciation: [madjɛʁ]; Occitan: Madièra) is a commune in the Ariège department in southwestern France.

== Population ==
Historical population
Year	Pop.	±% p.a.
1968	208	—
1975	170	−2.84%
1982	158	−1.04%
1990	172	+1.07%
1999	184	+0.75%
2007	198	+0.92%
2012	206	+0.80%
2017	211	+0.48%
2023	283	+5.01%
Source: INSEE

== See also ==
- Communes of the Ariège department
