= Saint-Michel, Ariège =

Commune in Occitanie, France

Saint-Michel
- Commune
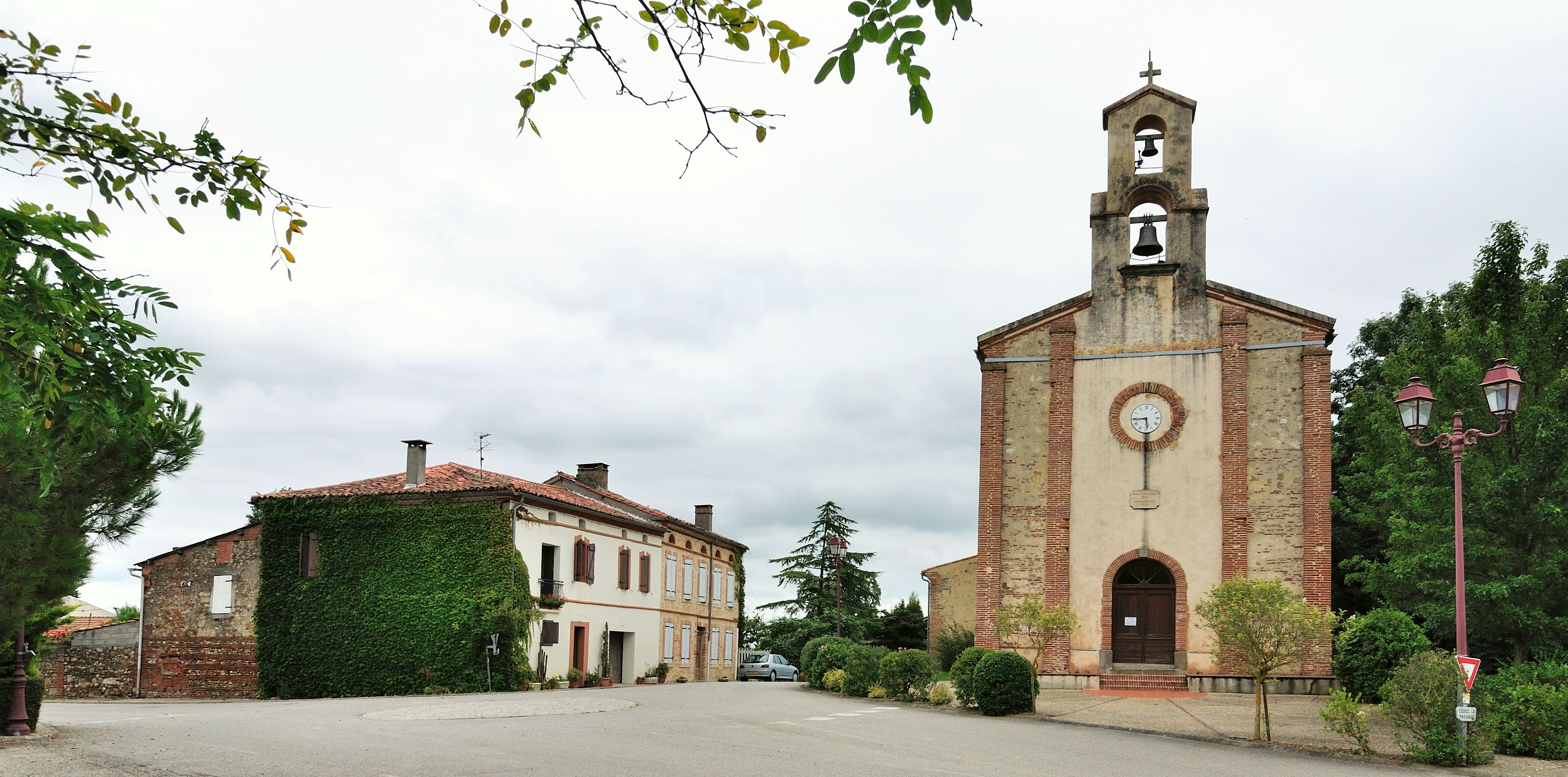
- The church and surroundings in Saint-Michel
- Location of Saint-Michel
- Location within France Location within Occitanie
- Coordinates: 43°08′10″N 1°30′11″E
- Country: France
- Region: Occitania
- Department: Ariège
- Arrondissement: Pamiers
- Canton: Pamiers-1

Government
  - Mayor (2020–2026): Sandrine Eychenne
- Area^{1}: 5.92 km^{2} (2.29 sq mi)
- Elevation: 400 m (1,300 ft)
- Highest elevation: 434 m (1,424 ft)
- Lowest elevation: 310 m (1,020 ft)
- Population (2023): 92
  - Density: 16/km^{2} (40/sq mi)
- Time zone: UTC+01:00 (CET)
  - Summer (DST): UTC+02:00 (CEST)
- INSEE/Postal code: 09271 /09100
- ^{1} French Land Register data, which excludes lakes, ponds, glaciers > 1 km^{2} (0.386 sq mi or 247 acres) and river estuaries.

Saint-Michel (French pronunciation: [sɛ̃ miʃɛl]; Languedocien: Sent Miquèl) is a commune in the Ariège department in southwestern France.

== Population ==
Inhabitants of Saint-Michel are called Saint-Micheliens in French.

Historical population
Year	Pop.	±% p.a.
1968	90	—
1975	74	−2.76%
1982	74	+0.00%
1990	80	+0.98%
1999	68	−1.79%
2007	84	+2.68%
2012	74	−2.50%
2017	72	−0.55%
2023	92	+4.17%
Source: INSEE

== See also ==
- Communes of the Ariège department
