= Vernet, Haute-Garonne =

Vernet
- Commune
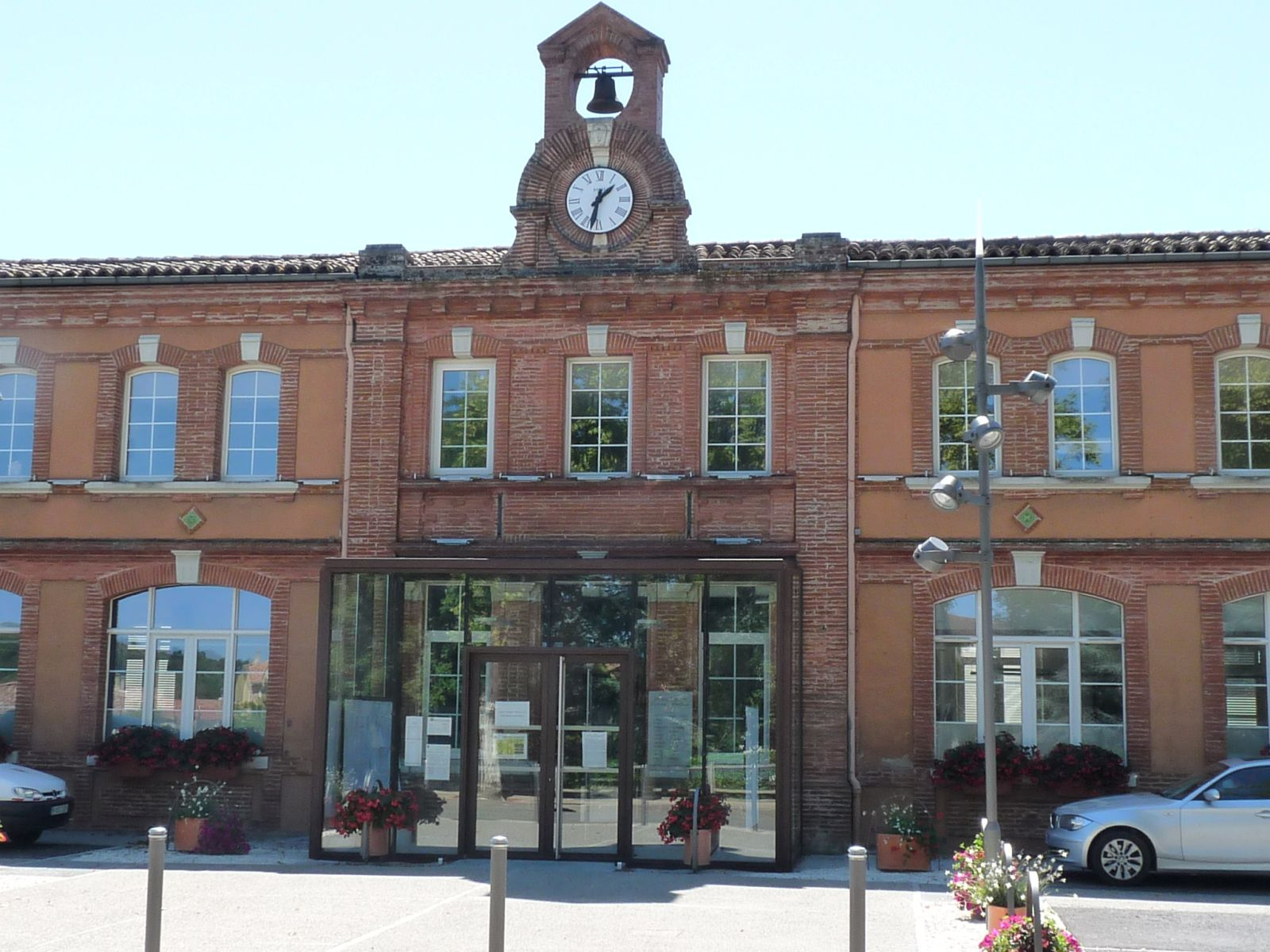
- The town hall in Vernet

- Coat of arms
- Location of Vernet
- Location within France Location within Occitanie
- Coordinates: 43°26′02″N 1°25′58″E
- Country: France
- Region: Occitania
- Department: Haute-Garonne
- Arrondissement: Muret
- Canton: Portet-sur-Garonne

Government
  - Mayor (2020–2026): Serge Demange
- Area^{1}: 10.07 km^{2} (3.89 sq mi)
- Elevation: 166 m (545 ft)
- Highest elevation: 504 m (1,654 ft)
- Lowest elevation: 279 m (915 ft)
- Population (2023): 3,381
  - Density: 335.7/km^{2} (869.6/sq mi)
- Time zone: UTC+01:00 (CET)
  - Summer (DST): UTC+02:00 (CEST)
- INSEE/Postal code: 31574 /31810
- ^{1} French Land Register data, which excludes lakes, ponds, glaciers > 1 km^{2} (0.386 sq mi or 247 acres) and river estuaries.

Vernet (French pronunciation: [vɛʁnɛ]; Occitan: Vernet) is a commune in the Haute-Garonne department in southwestern France.

== Geography ==
The Lèze forms most of the commune's northwestern border.

The Ariège forms the commune's eastern border.

== Population ==
Historical population
Year	Pop.	±% p.a.
1968	1,023	—
1975	1,272	+3.16%
1982	1,715	+4.36%
1990	2,015	+2.04%
1999	1,895	−0.68%
2007	2,059	+1.04%
2012	2,314	+2.36%
2017	2,871	+4.41%
2023	3,381	+2.76%
Source: INSEE

== See also ==
- Communes of the Haute-Garonne department
