= Vernet-la-Varenne =

- Part of Le Vernet-Chaméane
- Location of Vernet-la-Varenne
- Location within France Location within Auvergne-Rhône-Alpes
- Coordinates: 45°28′30″N 3°27′07″E
- Country: France
- Region: Auvergne-Rhône-Alpes
- Department: Puy-de-Dôme
- Arrondissement: Issoire
- Canton: Brassac-les-Mines
- Commune: Le Vernet-Chaméane
- Area^{1}: 35.10 km^{2} (13.55 sq mi)
- Elevation: 815 m (2,674 ft)
- Highest elevation: 1,051 m (3,448 ft)
- Lowest elevation: 542 m (1,778 ft)
- Population (2022): 621
  - Density: 17.7/km^{2} (45.8/sq mi)
- Time zone: UTC+01:00 (CET)
  - Summer (DST): UTC+02:00 (CEST)
- Postal code: 63580
- ^{1} French Land Register data, which excludes lakes, ponds, glaciers > 1 km^{2} (0.386 sq mi or 247 acres) and river estuaries.

Vernet-la-Varenne (French pronunciation: [vɛʁnɛ la vaʁɛn]; Auvergnat: Le Vernet or Le Vernet de la Varena) is a former commune in the Puy-de-Dôme department in Auvergne in central France. On 1 January 2019, it was merged into the new commune Le Vernet-Chaméane.

== See also ==
- Communes of the Puy-de-Dôme department
