= Saint-Bauzeil =

Commune in Occitanie, France

- Commune
- Location of Saint-Bauzeil
- Location within France Location within Occitanie
- Coordinates: 43°04′41″N 1°34′25″E
- Country: France
- Region: Occitania
- Department: Ariège
- Arrondissement: Foix
- Canton: Pamiers-1
- Intercommunality: CA Pays Foix-Varilhes

Government
  - Mayor (2020–2026): Jean-Pierre Mirouze
- Area^{1}: 4.47 km^{2} (1.73 sq mi)
- Elevation: 320 m (1,050 ft)
- Highest elevation: 473 m (1,552 ft)
- Lowest elevation: 317 m (1,040 ft)
- Population (2023): 52
  - Density: 12/km^{2} (30/sq mi)
- Time zone: UTC+01:00 (CET)
  - Summer (DST): UTC+02:00 (CEST)
- INSEE/Postal code: 09256 /09120
- ^{1} French Land Register data, which excludes lakes, ponds, glaciers > 1 km^{2} (0.386 sq mi or 247 acres) and river estuaries.

Saint-Bauzeil (French pronunciation: [sɛ̃ bozɛj]; Occitan: Sent Bauselh) is a commune in the Ariège department in southwestern France.

== Population ==
Inhabitants are called Saint-Bauzeillois in French.

Historical population
Year	Pop.	±% p.a.
1968	48	—
1975	44	−1.24%
1982	58	+4.03%
1990	51	−1.59%
1999	56	+1.04%
2007	52	−0.92%
2012	72	+6.72%
2017	57	−4.56%
2023	52	−1.52%
Source: INSEE

== See also ==
- Communes of the Ariège department
