= Canton of Pamiers-1 =

Coordinates: 43.11°N 1.61°E

- Canton
- Situation of the canton of Pamiers-1 in the department of Ariège
- Country: France
- Region: Occitania
- Department: Ariège
- No. of communes: {{{nbcomm}}}
- Population (2023): 12,868
- INSEE code: 0907

The canton of Pamiers-1 is an administrative division of the Ariège department, southern France. It was created at the French canton reorganisation which came into effect in March 2015. Its seat is in Pamiers.

It consists of the following communes:

1. Artix
2. Benagues
3. Bézac
4. Escosse
5. Lescousse
6. Madière
7. Pamiers (partly)
8. Rieux-de-Pelleport
9. Saint-Bauzeil
10. Saint-Jean-du-Falga
11. Saint-Martin-d'Oydes
12. Saint-Michel
13. Saint-Victor-Rouzaud
14. Unzent
