= Benagues =

Commune in Occitanie, France

- Commune
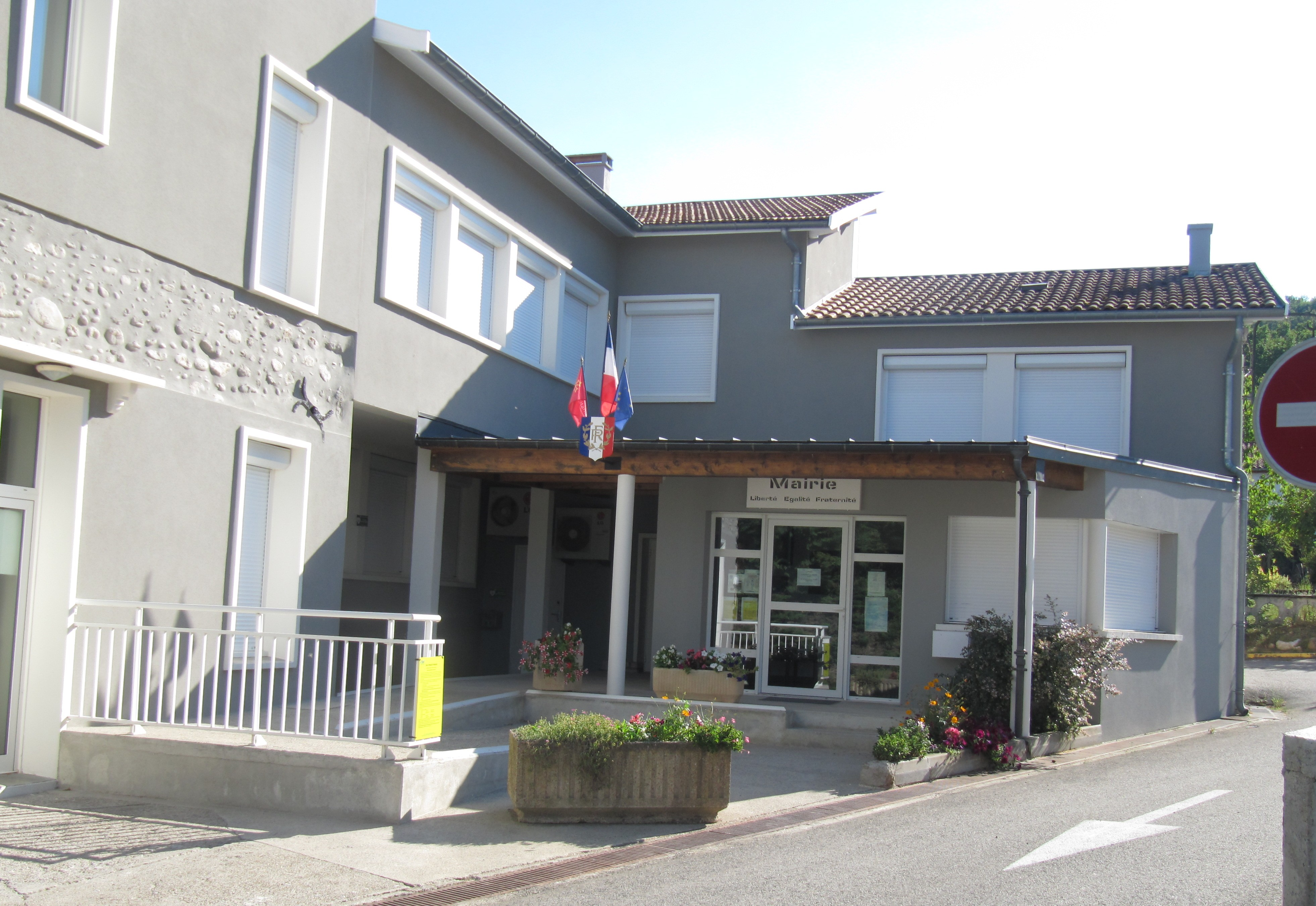
- Benagues Town hall
- Location of Benagues
- Location within France Location within Occitanie
- Coordinates: 43°04′41″N 1°36′41″E
- Country: France
- Region: Occitania
- Department: Ariège
- Arrondissement: Pamiers
- Canton: Pamiers-1

Government
  - Mayor (2020–2026): Josiane Berge
- Area^{1}: 3.01 km^{2} (1.16 sq mi)
- Elevation: 300 m (980 ft)
- Highest elevation: 481 m (1,578 ft)
- Lowest elevation: 295 m (968 ft)
- Population (2023): 488
  - Density: 162/km^{2} (420/sq mi)
- Time zone: UTC+01:00 (CET)
  - Summer (DST): UTC+02:00 (CEST)
- INSEE/Postal code: 09050 /09100
- ^{1} French Land Register data, which excludes lakes, ponds, glaciers > 1 km^{2} (0.386 sq mi or 247 acres) and river estuaries.

Benagues (French pronunciation: [bənaɡ]; Occitan: Benagas) is a commune in the Ariège department of southwestern France.

== Population ==
Historical population
Year	Pop.	±% p.a.
1968	143	—
1975	166	+2.15%
1982	176	+0.84%
1990	285	+6.21%
1999	329	+1.61%
2007	463	+4.36%
2012	475	+0.51%
2017	514	+1.59%
2023	488	−0.86%
Source: INSEE

The inhabitants of the commune are known as Bénaguais in French.

== See also ==
- Communes of the Ariège department
