= Lescousse =

Commune in Occitanie, France

- Commune
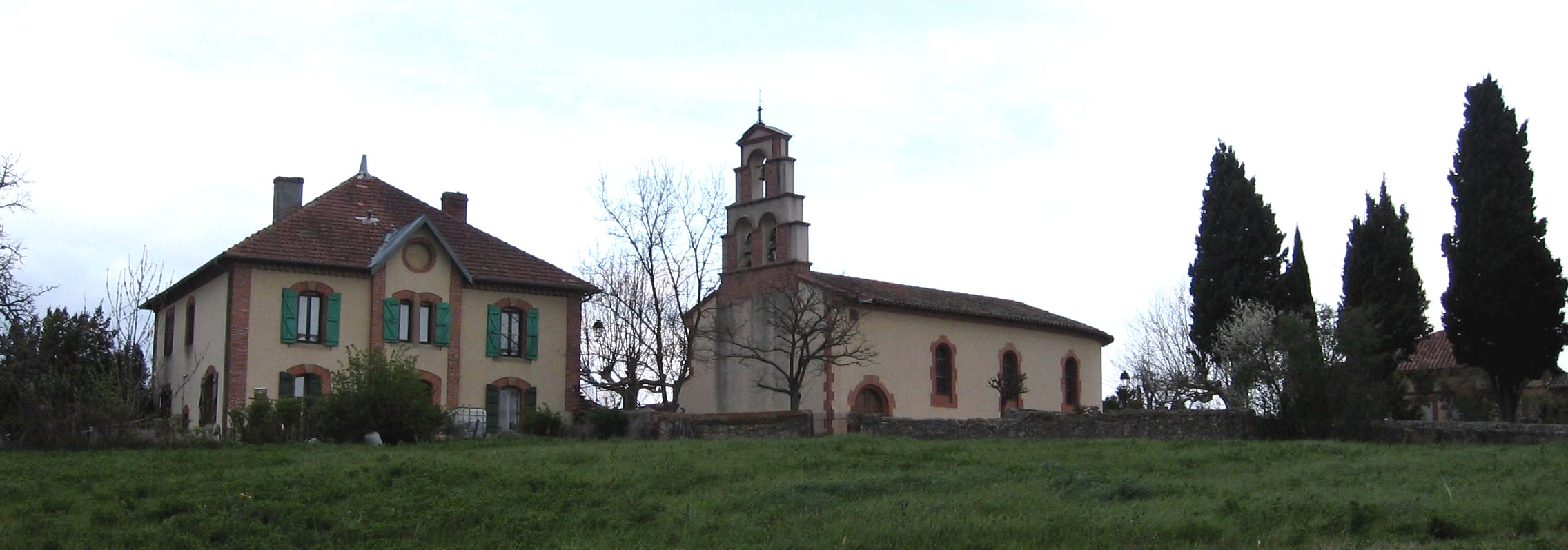
- The church and surroundings in Lescousse
- Location of Lescousse
- Location within France Location within Occitanie
- Coordinates: 43°09′17″N 1°30′49″E
- Country: France
- Region: Occitania
- Department: Ariège
- Arrondissement: Pamiers
- Canton: Pamiers-1

Government
  - Mayor (2020–2026): Max Bellini
- Area^{1}: 8.48 km^{2} (3.27 sq mi)
- Elevation: 340 m (1,120 ft)
- Highest elevation: 383 m (1,257 ft)
- Lowest elevation: 280 m (920 ft)
- Population (2023): 82
  - Density: 9.7/km^{2} (25/sq mi)
- Time zone: UTC+01:00 (CET)
  - Summer (DST): UTC+02:00 (CEST)
- INSEE/Postal code: 09163 /09100
- ^{1} French Land Register data, which excludes lakes, ponds, glaciers > 1 km^{2} (0.386 sq mi or 247 acres) and river estuaries.

Lescousse (French pronunciation: [lɛskus]; Occitan: Lescoça) is a commune in the Ariège department in southwestern France.

== Population ==
Historical population
| Year | Pop. | ±% p.a. |
|---|---|---|
| 1968 | 111 | — |
| 1975 | 109 | −0.26% |
| 1982 | 103 | −0.81% |
| 1990 | 90 | −1.67% |
| 1999 | 81 | −1.16% |
| 2007 | 91 | +1.47% |
| 2012 | 82 | −2.06% |
| 2017 | 75 | −1.77% |
| 2023 | 82 | +1.50% |
Source: INSEE

== See also ==
- Communes of the Ariège department
