= Rieux-de-Pelleport =

Commune in Occitanie, France

- Commune
- Coat of arms
- Location of Rieux-de-Pelleport
- Location within France Location within Occitanie
- Coordinates: 43°03′30″N 1°36′37″E
- Country: France
- Region: Occitania
- Department: Ariège
- Arrondissement: Foix
- Canton: Pamiers-1
- Intercommunality: CA Pays Foix-Varilhes

Government
  - Mayor (2020–2026): Anne Vilaplana
- Area^{1}: 8.16 km^{2} (3.15 sq mi)
- Elevation: 330 m (1,080 ft)
- Highest elevation: 686 m (2,251 ft)
- Lowest elevation: 309 m (1,014 ft)
- Population (2023): 1,253
  - Density: 154/km^{2} (398/sq mi)
- Time zone: UTC+01:00 (CET)
  - Summer (DST): UTC+02:00 (CEST)
- INSEE/Postal code: 09245 /09120
- ^{1} French Land Register data, which excludes lakes, ponds, glaciers > 1 km^{2} (0.386 sq mi or 247 acres) and river estuaries.

Rieux-de-Pelleport (French pronunciation: [ʁjø də pɛlpɔʁ]; Occitan: Rius de Pelapòrc) is a commune in the Ariège department in southwestern France.

== Population ==
Inhabitants are called Ruxéens in French.

Historical population
Year	Pop.	±% p.a.
1968	292	—
1975	323	+1.45%
1982	477	+5.73%
1990	700	+4.91%
1999	848	+2.15%
2007	1,132	+3.68%
2012	1,256	+2.10%
2017	1,304	+0.75%
2023	1,253	−0.66%
Source: INSEE

== See also ==
- Communes of the Ariège department
