= Lac de Mondély =

Lake in France

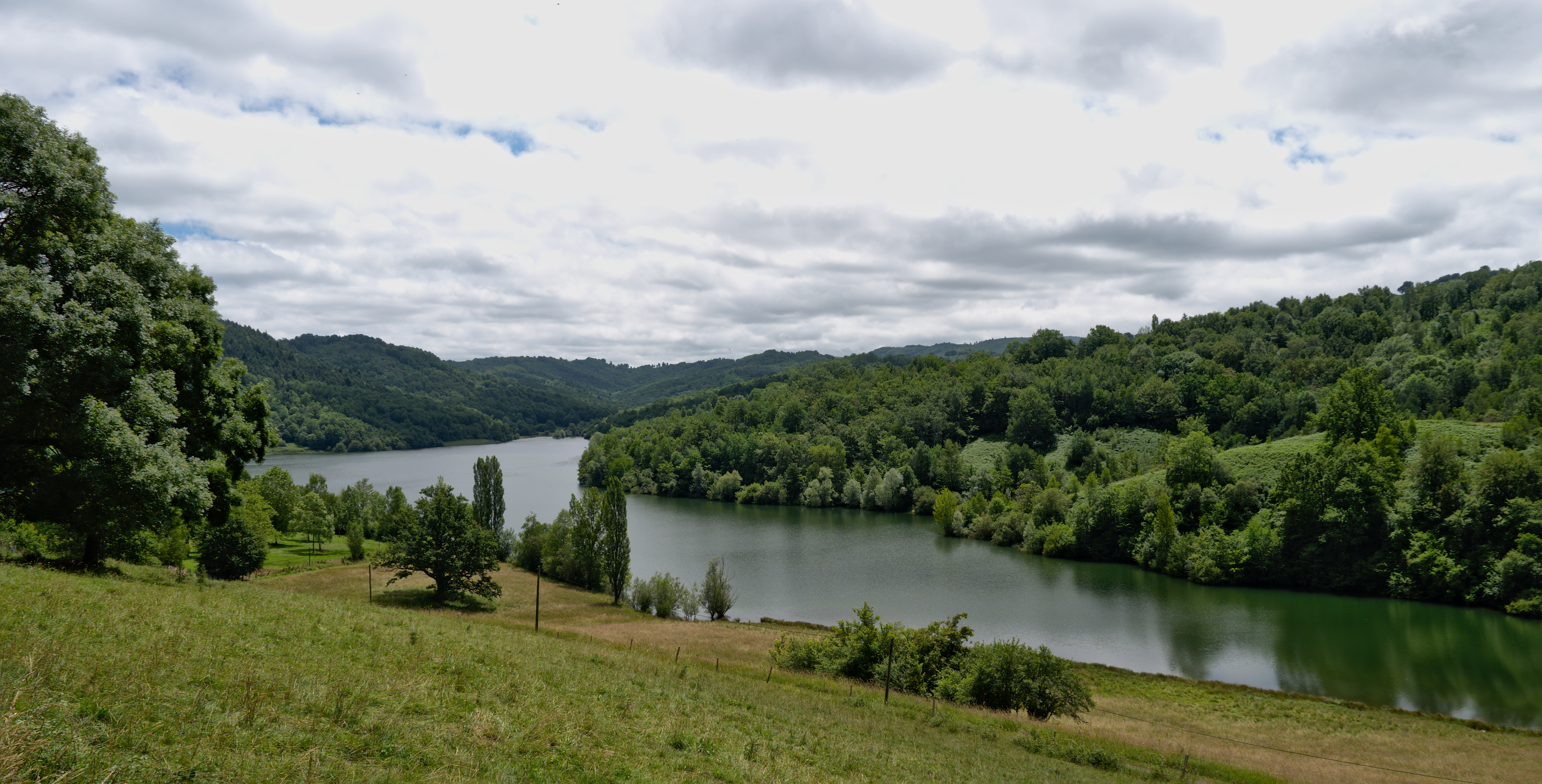

- Location within France
- Location: Ariège
- Coordinates: 43.052348°N 1.437836°E
- Type: artificial
- Primary inflows: Lèze
- Primary outflows: Lèze
- Basin countries: France
- Max. depth: 24 m (79 ft)
- Water volume: 4,000,000 m^{3} (140,000,000 cu ft)

Lac de Mondély is a lake in Ariège, France, home to mushrooms, migratory birds, as well as a number of species of fish including trout, gudgeon, and minnow.
