= Saint-Victor-Rouzaud =

Commune in Occitanie, France

- Commune
- Location of Saint-Victor-Rouzaud
- Location within France Location within Occitanie
- Coordinates: 43°05′42″N 1°33′10″E
- Country: France
- Region: Occitania
- Department: Ariège
- Arrondissement: Pamiers
- Canton: Pamiers-1
- Intercommunality: Portes d'Ariège Pyrénées

Government
  - Mayor (2020–2026): Denis Prax
- Area^{1}: 12.77 km^{2} (4.93 sq mi)
- Highest elevation: 681 m (2,234 ft)
- Lowest elevation: 293 m (961 ft)
- Population (2023): 210
  - Density: 16/km^{2} (43/sq mi)
- Time zone: UTC+01:00 (CET)
  - Summer (DST): UTC+02:00 (CEST)
- INSEE/Postal code: 09276 /09100
- ^{1} French Land Register data, which excludes lakes, ponds, glaciers > 1 km^{2} (0.386 sq mi or 247 acres) and river estuaries.

Saint-Victor-Rouzaud (French pronunciation: [sɛ̃ viktɔʁ ʁuzo]; Languedocien: Sent Victor e Rosaud) is a commune in the Ariège department in southwestern France.

== Population ==
Inhabitants Saint-Victor-Rouzaud are called Saint-Victoriens in French.

Historical population
Year	Pop.	±% p.a.
1968	169	—
1975	138	−2.85%
1982	161	+2.23%
1990	151	−0.80%
1999	161	+0.72%
2007	217	+3.80%
2012	227	+0.91%
2017	231	+0.35%
2023	210	−1.58%
Source: INSEE

== See also ==
- Communes of the Ariège department
