= Gabre, Ariège =

Commune in Occitanie, France

Gabre
- Commune
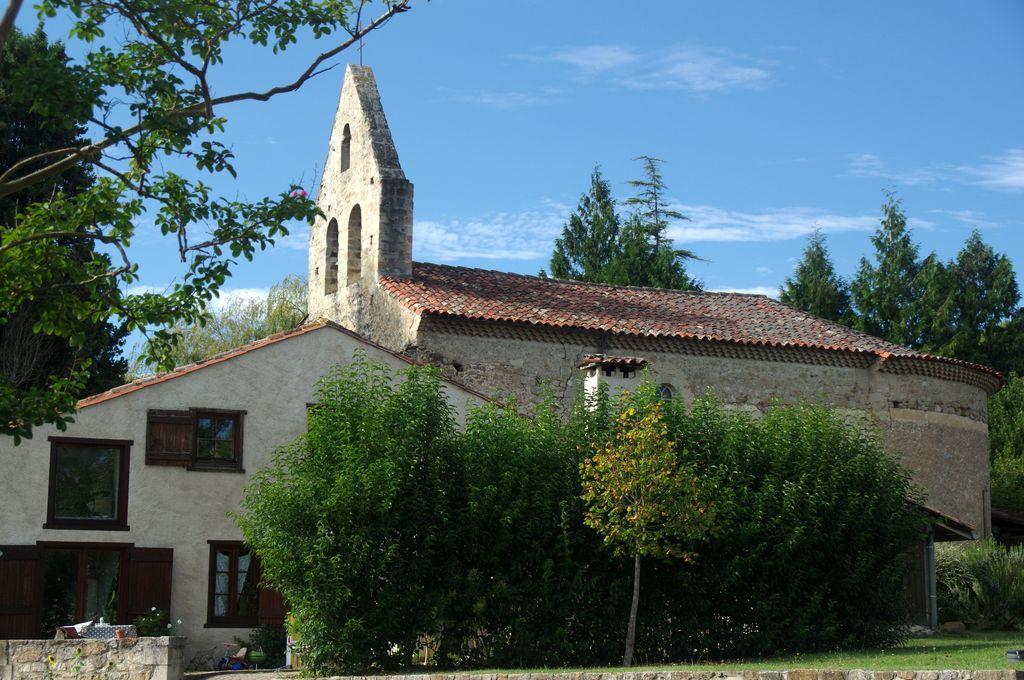
- The church in Gabre
- Location of Gabre
- Location within France Location within Occitanie
- Coordinates: 43°04′34″N 1°25′06″E
- Country: France
- Region: Occitania
- Department: Ariège
- Arrondissement: Saint-Girons
- Canton: Arize-Lèze
- Intercommunality: Arize Lèze

Government
  - Mayor (2020–2026): Jean-Paul Dejean
- Area^{1}: 13.36 km^{2} (5.16 sq mi)
- Elevation: 373 m (1,224 ft)
- Highest elevation: 570 m (1,870 ft)
- Lowest elevation: 286 m (938 ft)
- Population (2023): 124
  - Density: 9.28/km^{2} (24.0/sq mi)
- Time zone: UTC+01:00 (CET)
  - Summer (DST): UTC+02:00 (CEST)
- INSEE/Postal code: 09127 /09290
- ^{1} French Land Register data, which excludes lakes, ponds, glaciers > 1 km^{2} (0.386 sq mi or 247 acres) and river estuaries.

Gabre (French pronunciation: [ɡabʁ]) is a commune in the Ariège department in southwestern France.

== Geography ==
The Lèze, with the Lake of Mondely, forms part of the commune's southeastern border, flows northeast through the eastern part of the commune, then forms part of its northeastern border.

== Population ==
Historical population
Year	Pop.	±% p.a.
1968	106	—
1975	96	−1.41%
1982	99	+0.44%
1990	95	−0.51%
1999	92	−0.36%
2007	92	+0.00%
2012	104	+2.48%
2017	123	+3.41%
2023	124	+0.14%
Source: INSEE

== See also ==
- Communes of the Ariège department
