= Ariège (river) =

River in France and Andorra

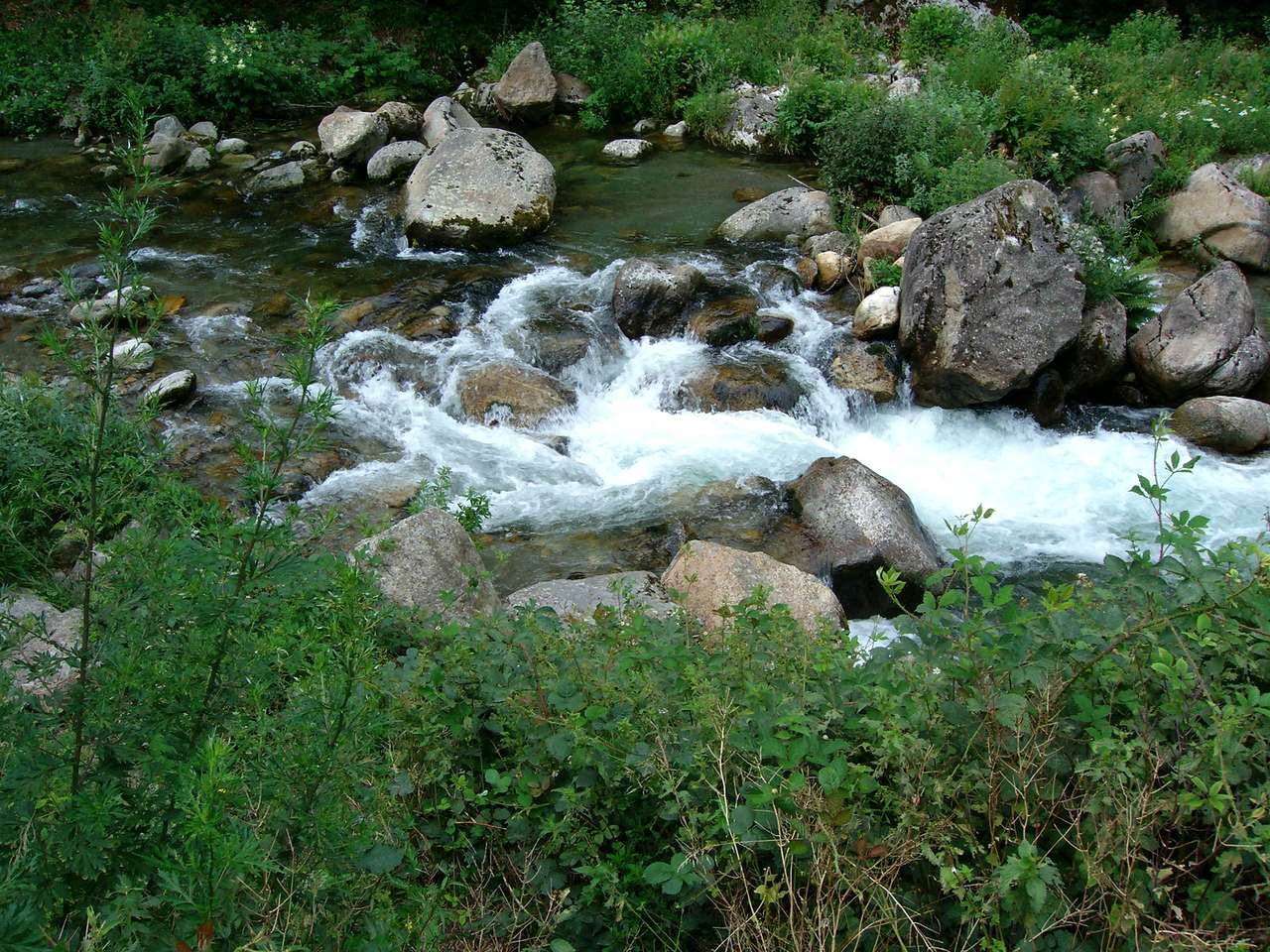
- The Ariège near Ax-les-Thermes

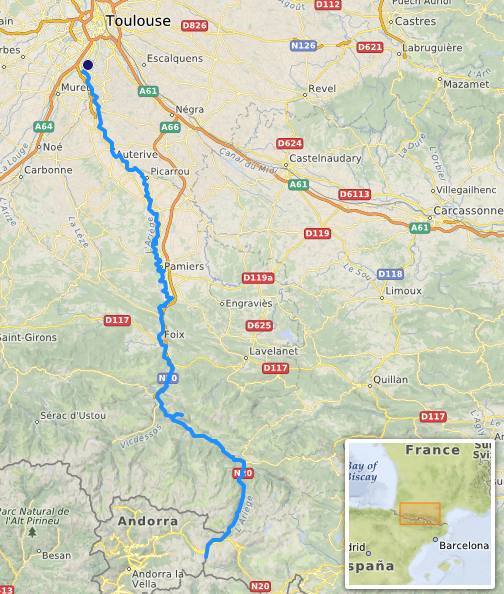

Location
- Countries: France; Andorra

Physical characteristics
- Source
  - location: Pyrenees
  - elevation: ± 2,400 m (7,900 ft)
- Mouth
  - location: Garonne
  - coordinates: 43°31′2″N 1°24′36″E
- Length: 163 km (101 mi)
- Basin size: 3,860 km^{2} (1,490 sq mi)
- Discharge
  - average: 65 m^{3}/s (2,300 cu ft/s)

Basin features
- Progression: Garonne→ Gironde estuary→ Atlantic Ocean

The Ariège (French pronunciation: [aʁjɛʒ]; Occitan: Arièja; Catalan: Arieja) is a river in southern France and Andorra. It is a right bank tributary of the Garonne. From its source in the Pyrenees near El Pas de la Casa, the river flows north for about 163 km (101 mi) and drains approximately 4,200 km^{2} (1,600 sq mi) of basin area. The river is managed by the authority of the Agence de l’eau Adour-Garonne, to preserve the water quality, and has several dams for hydropower generation.

== Course ==
The river emerges at the base of Puy-Nègre in the Pyrenees that divide the Southern France from Andorra. It flows northwards for 163 km (101 mi)} and joins the Garonne on its right bank in Portet-sur-Garonne, south of Toulouse. It has several tributaries, the longest of which are the Hers-Vif and the Lèze.

== Hydrology ==
The river has a watershed region that extends from Portet to the Pyrenees, covering 4,200 km^{2} (1,600 sq mi). The flow is about 40 m/s (130 ft/s) measured at Foix and increases downstream. Cold snowmelt and rainfall in spring causes increased flow with flood risk during autumn's heavy rains, and low flows in summer and winter. The water quality in the river basin is managed by the authority of the Agence de l’eau Adour-Garonne. The river has several hydroelectric dams on it.
