= Aisey-sur-Seine =

- Commune
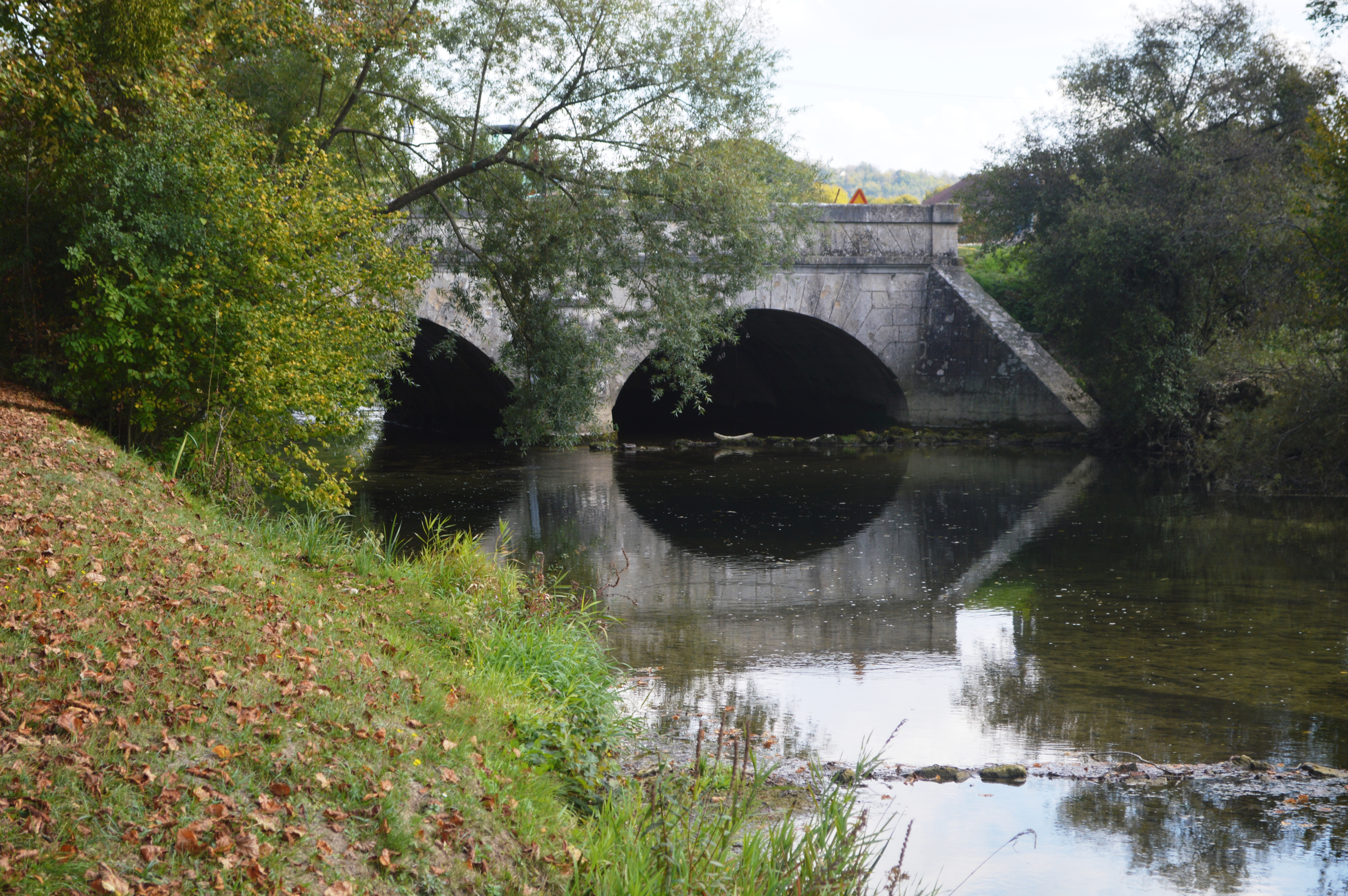
- The Bridge of Troubles on the Seine at Aisey-sur-Seine

- Coat of arms
- Location of Aisey-sur-Seine
- Location within France Location within Bourgogne-Franche-Comté
- Coordinates: 47°45′04″N 4°34′52″E
- Country: France
- Region: Bourgogne-Franche-Comté
- Department: Côte-d'Or
- Arrondissement: Montbard
- Canton: Châtillon-sur-Seine
- Intercommunality: Pays Châtillonnais

Government
  - Mayor (2020–2026): Gérard Eme
- Area^{1}: 12.72 km^{2} (4.91 sq mi)
- Elevation: 264 m (866 ft)
- Highest elevation: 379 m (1,243 ft)
- Lowest elevation: 251 m (823 ft)
- Population (2023): 160
  - Density: 13/km^{2} (33/sq mi)
- Time zone: UTC+01:00 (CET)
  - Summer (DST): UTC+02:00 (CEST)
- INSEE/Postal code: 21006 /21400
- ^{1} French Land Register data, which excludes lakes, ponds, glaciers > 1 km^{2} (0.386 sq mi or 247 acres) and river estuaries.

Aisey-sur-Seine (French pronunciation: [ɛzɛ syʁ sɛn], literally Aisey on Seine) is a commune in the Côte-d'Or department in the Bourgogne-Franche-Comté region of eastern France.

== Geography ==
Aisey-sur-Seine is located some 12 km south of Chatillon-sur-Seine and about 25 km north-east of Montbard. The commune can be reached by travelling east from Coulmier-le-Sec on Highway D29 which passes through the heart of the commune and the town before continuing east to join Highway D16 near Saint-Germain-le-Rocheux. The commune can also be accessed from the north on Highway D971 (the Route de Dijon) from Nod-sur-Seine. Highway D971 continues through the town and commune south to Saint-Marc-sur-Seine. Other highways entering the commune are the D101A from Chemin-d'Aisey in the south-west and the D29C cross-country road from Nod-sur-Seine which joins Highway D29 in the commune. The commune has large areas of forest - especially in the east and the south with some farmland on the western side.

The commune is traversed by the Seine river which forms part of the south-eastern boundary before passing northwards through the town then along a part of the northern border before continuing north to Chamesson. The Brevon Stream which forms the south-eastern boundary of the commune joins the Seine near the intersection of Highway D29 and D101 (a side road from the D971).

== History ==
Formerly known as Aisey-le-Duc.

In the Middle Ages, Aisey-sur-Seine was the seat of a lordship. There is a well-preserved Fortified house with a game park.

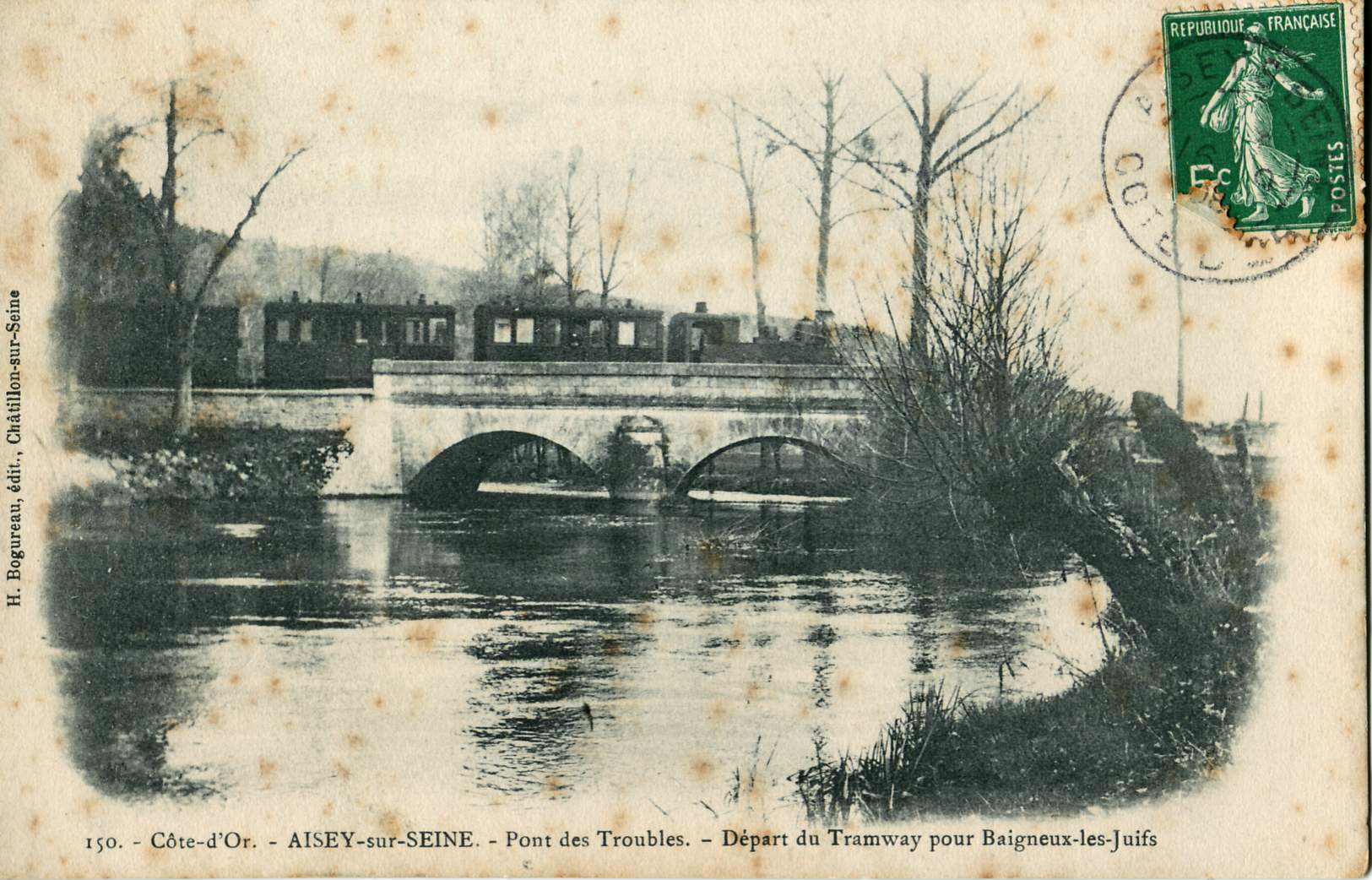
The village was served by a light railway line to metre gauge from 1891 to 1933 that linked the village to Châtillon-sur-Seine, Dijon and Baigneux-les-Juifs, operated by Chemins de fer départementaux de la Côte-d'Or

== Heraldry ==
Arms of Aisey-sur-Seine	The official status of the blazon remains to be determined. The arms of the commune of Abos are blazoned : Quarterly, first of Gules a saltire couped debruised by a pallet couped, all of Or; the second Azure of three fleurs-de-lis of Or 2 and 1 and a bendlet couped of Gules; the third Azure with lion of Or; the fourth Or with a tree Vert eradicated in chief Gules charged with a mullet of Or between two roundels the same.

== Administration ==
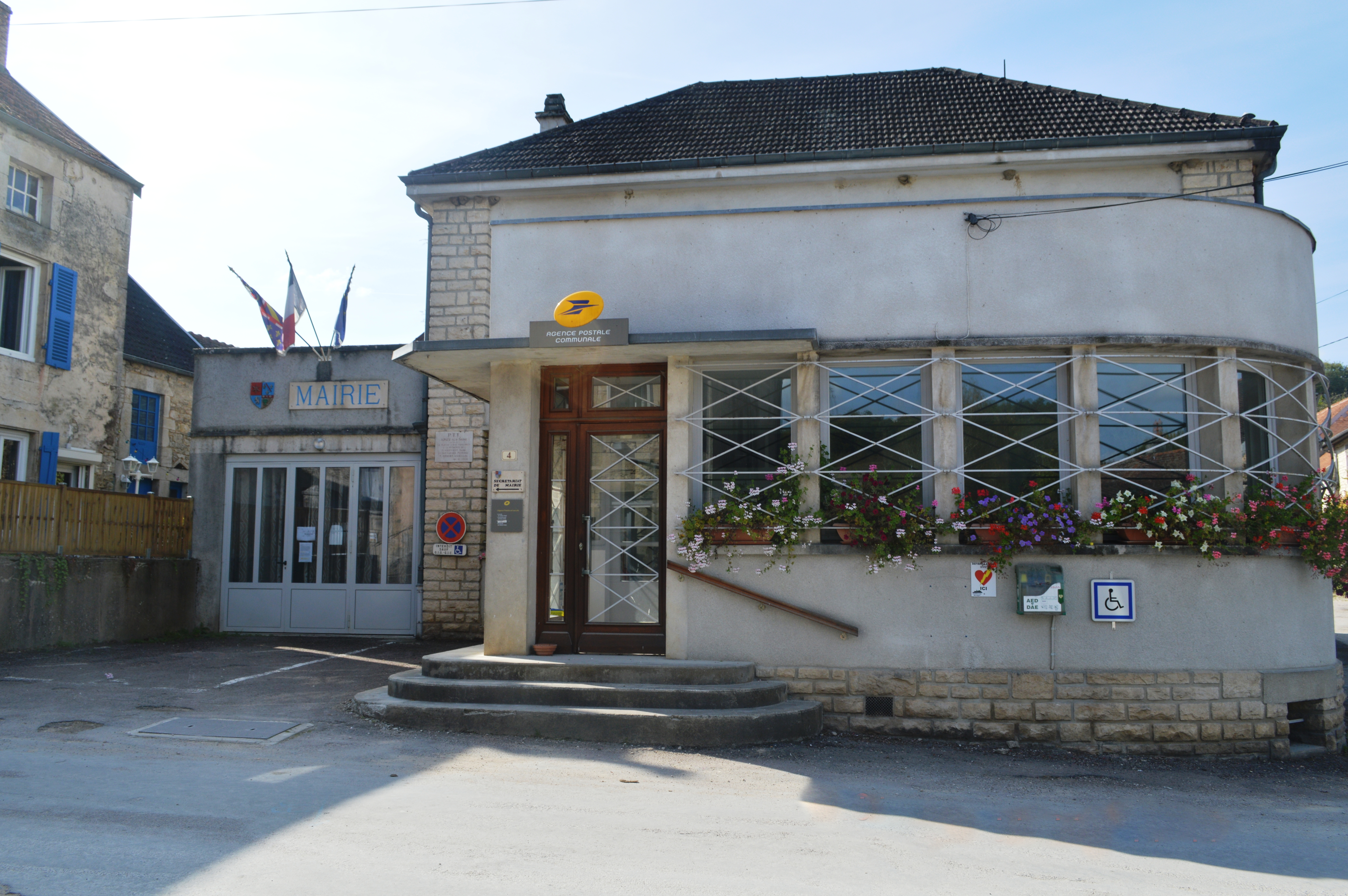
The Town Hall

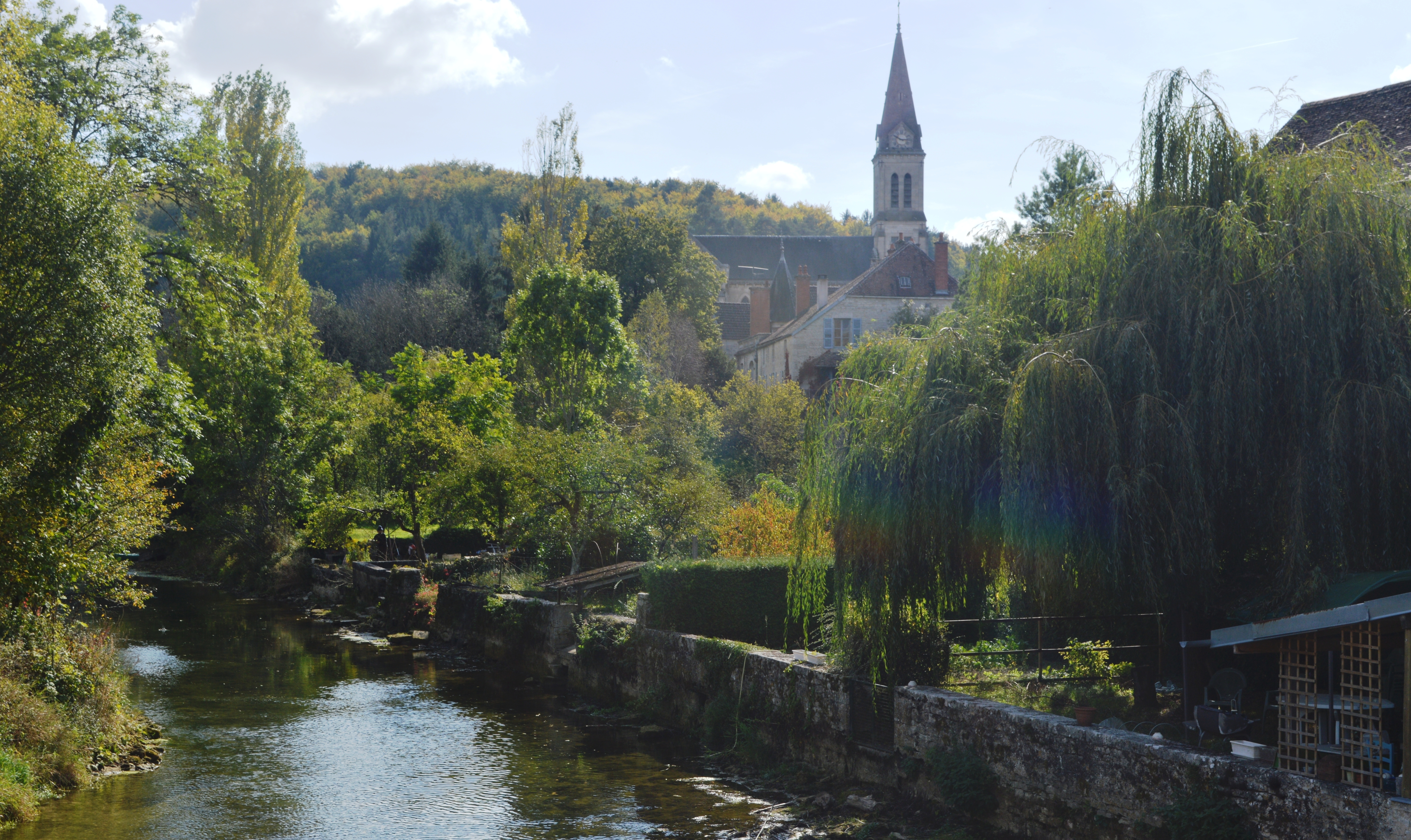
The Seine at Aisey-sur-Seine

List of Successive Mayors of Aisey-sur-Seine

From	To	Name	Party
1995	2001	Pierre Mars	
2001	2008	Jean Abord-Hugon	ind.
2008	2026	Gérard Ème	

== Population ==
The inhabitants of the commune are known as Aiseyens or Aiseyennes in French.

Historical population
Year	Pop.	±% p.a.
1968	219	—
1975	150	−5.26%
1982	147	−0.29%
1990	172	+1.98%
1999	196	+1.46%
2007	218	+1.34%
2012	199	−1.81%
2017	176	−2.43%
2023	160	−1.58%
Source: INSEE

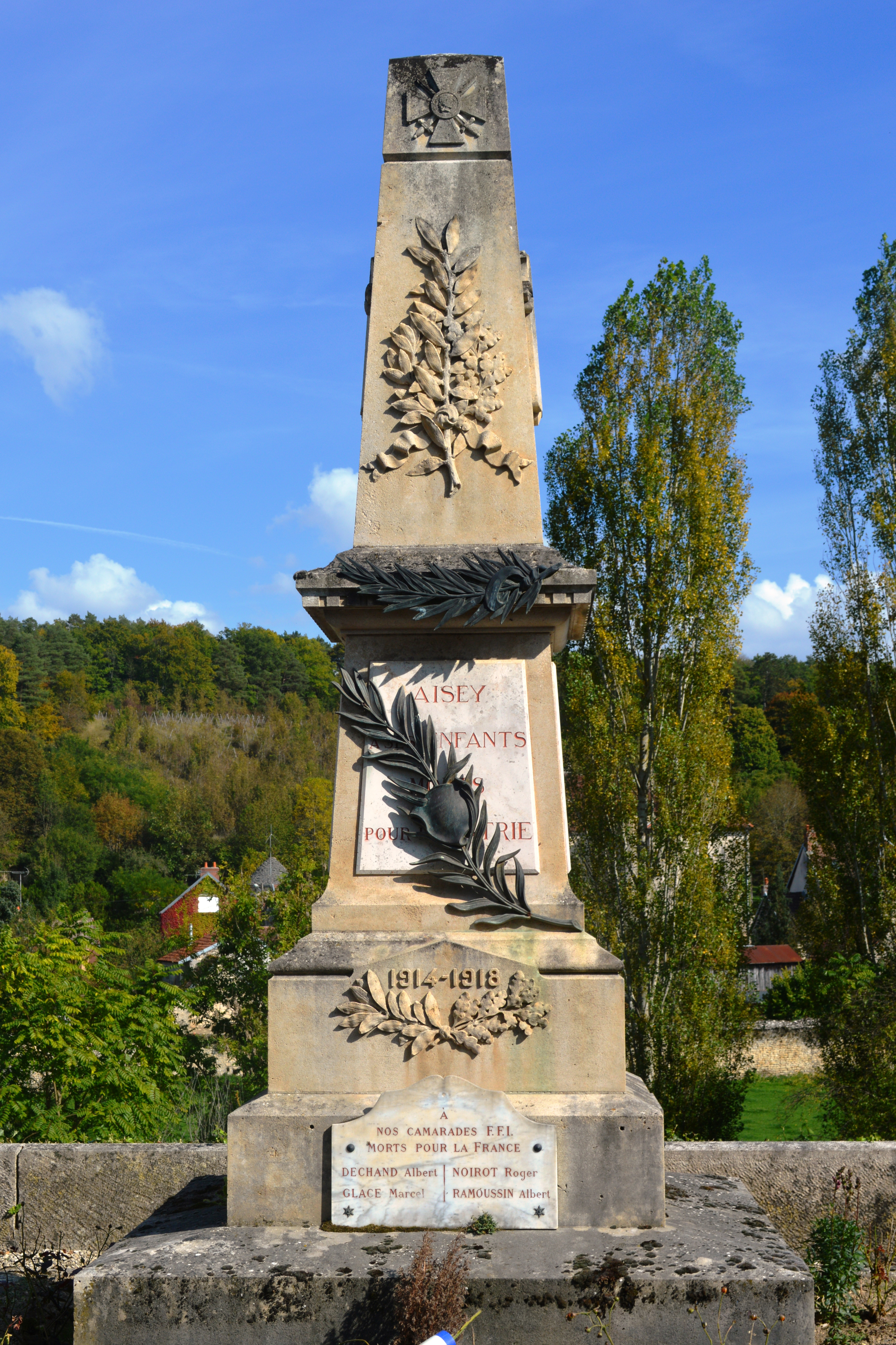
Aisey-sur-Seine War Memorial

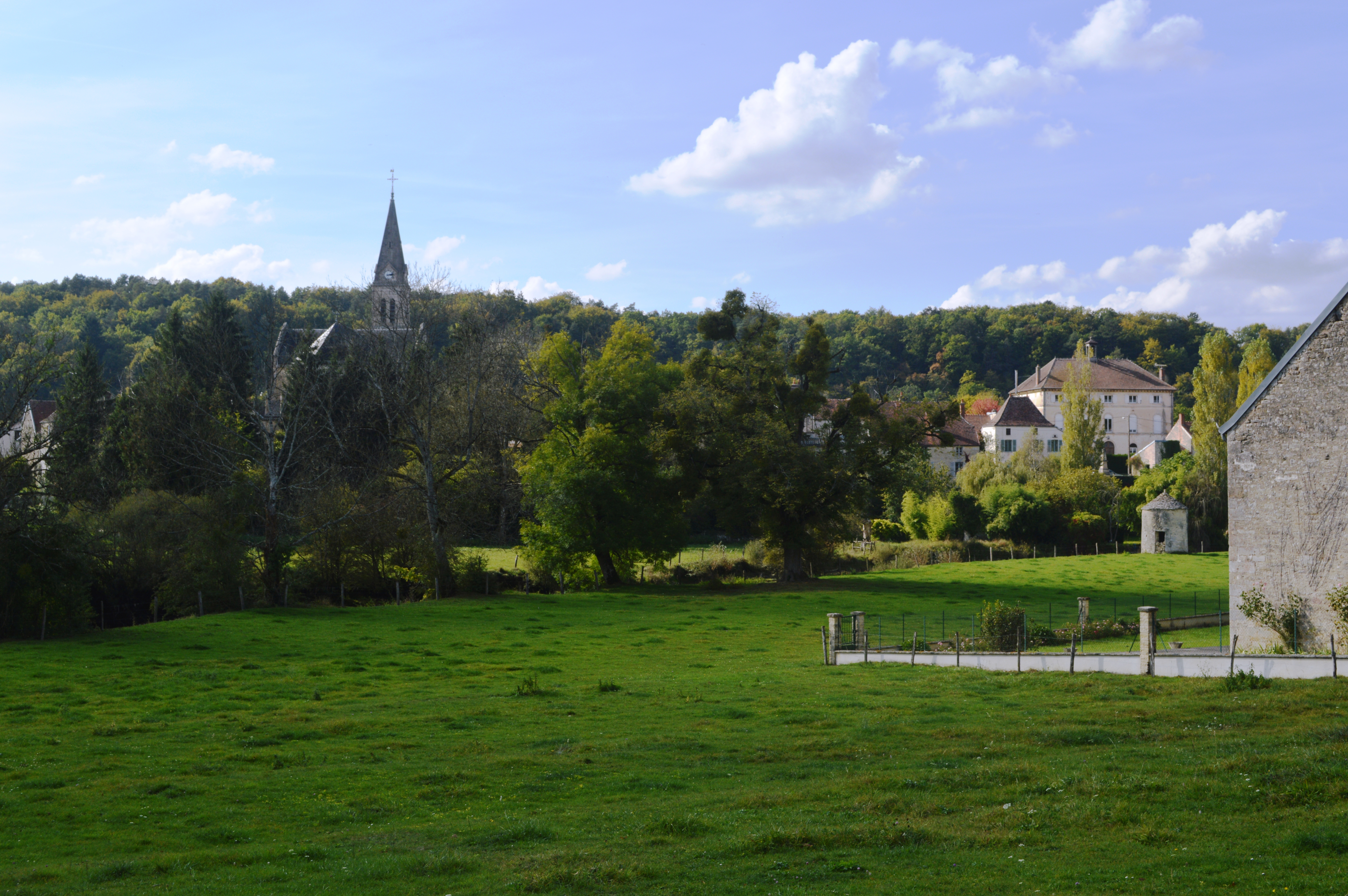
Aisey-sur-Seine Landscape

== Culture and heritage ==
=== Civil heritage ===
The commune has many buildings and structures that are registered as historical monuments:

- A Lavoir (Public laundry) and the Fountain of April (1846)
- The Maison Huguenin Hospice and Charity House (1846)
- A House (1) at Grande Rue (19th century)
- A House (2) at Grande Rue (19th century)
- A House at Rue Haute (19th century)
- A Flour Mill at Rue du Pont (19th century)
- A Lavoir (Public laundry) at Rue du Pont (18th century)
- A Bridge at Rue du Pont (17th century)
- The Chateau de Tavannes at RN 71 (15th century)
- The Bridge of Troubles at RN 71 (17th century)
- A House at Rue Rougeot (19th century)
- A Lavoir (Public laundry) and Drinking Trough at Grande Rue (19th century)
- The Town Hall / School at Grande Rue (19th century)
- Houses (19th century)
- The Chateau of the Dukes of Burgundy at La Barque (12th century)

=== Religious heritage ===
The commune has several religious buildings and structures that are registered as historical monuments:

- A Cemetery Cross at Chemin des Chenevières (19th century)
- A Cemetery at Chemin des Chenevières (19th century)
- A Wayside Cross at CVO 3 and CR 7 crossroads (1826)
- A Wayside Cross at Rue de la Poterne and CR 18 crossroads (1866)
- A Wayside Cross at RD 29 and RD 101a crossroads (1830)
- A Wayside Cross at Grande Rue (1767)
- A Presbytery at Grande Rue (18th century)
- The Parish Church of Saint-Genest at Grande Rue (19th century). The church contains a very large number of items that are registered as historical objects.

=== Gallery of Historical Monuments ===
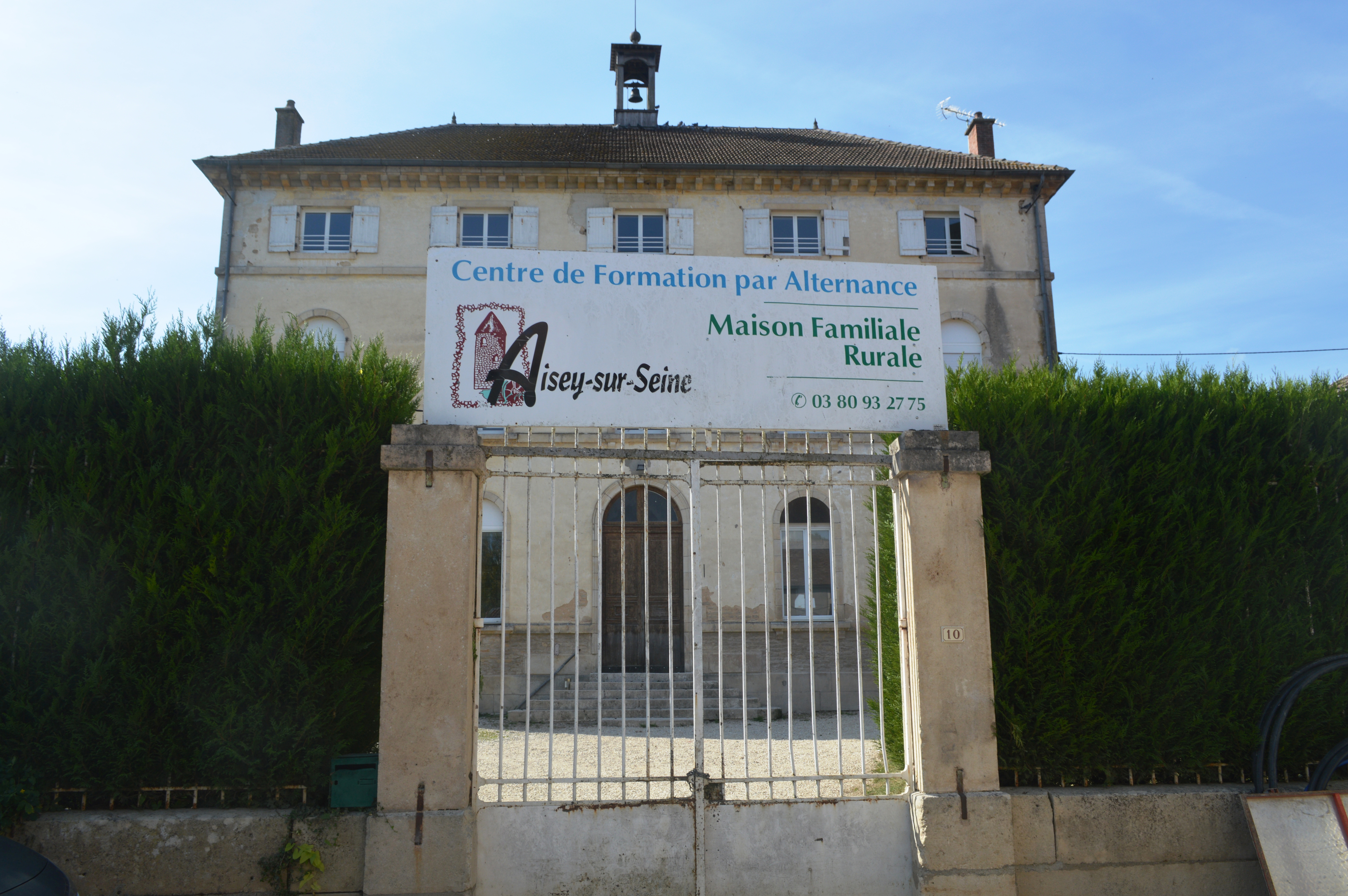
The Maison Huguenin Hospice and Charity House

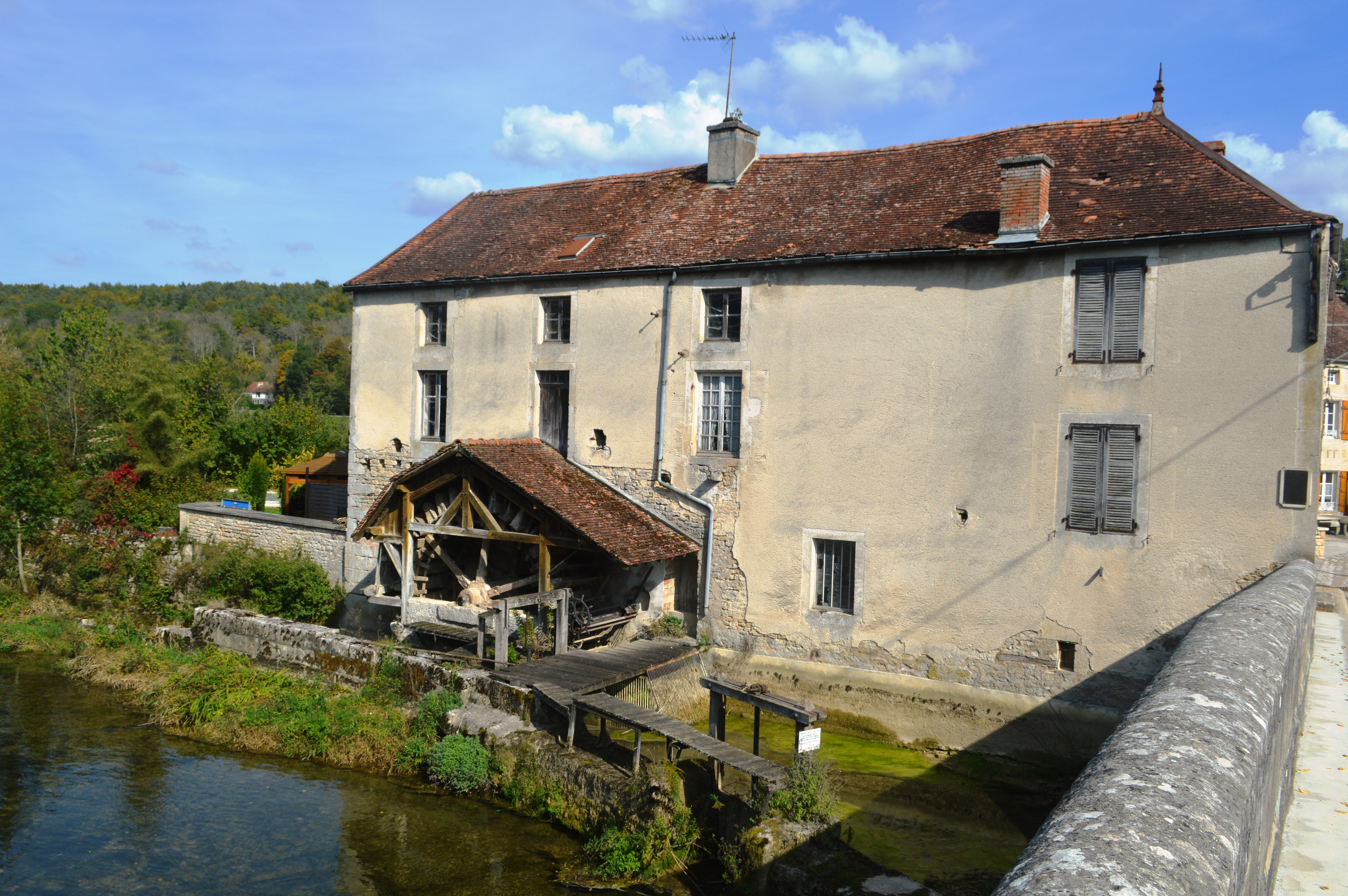
The Flour Mill at Rue du Pont

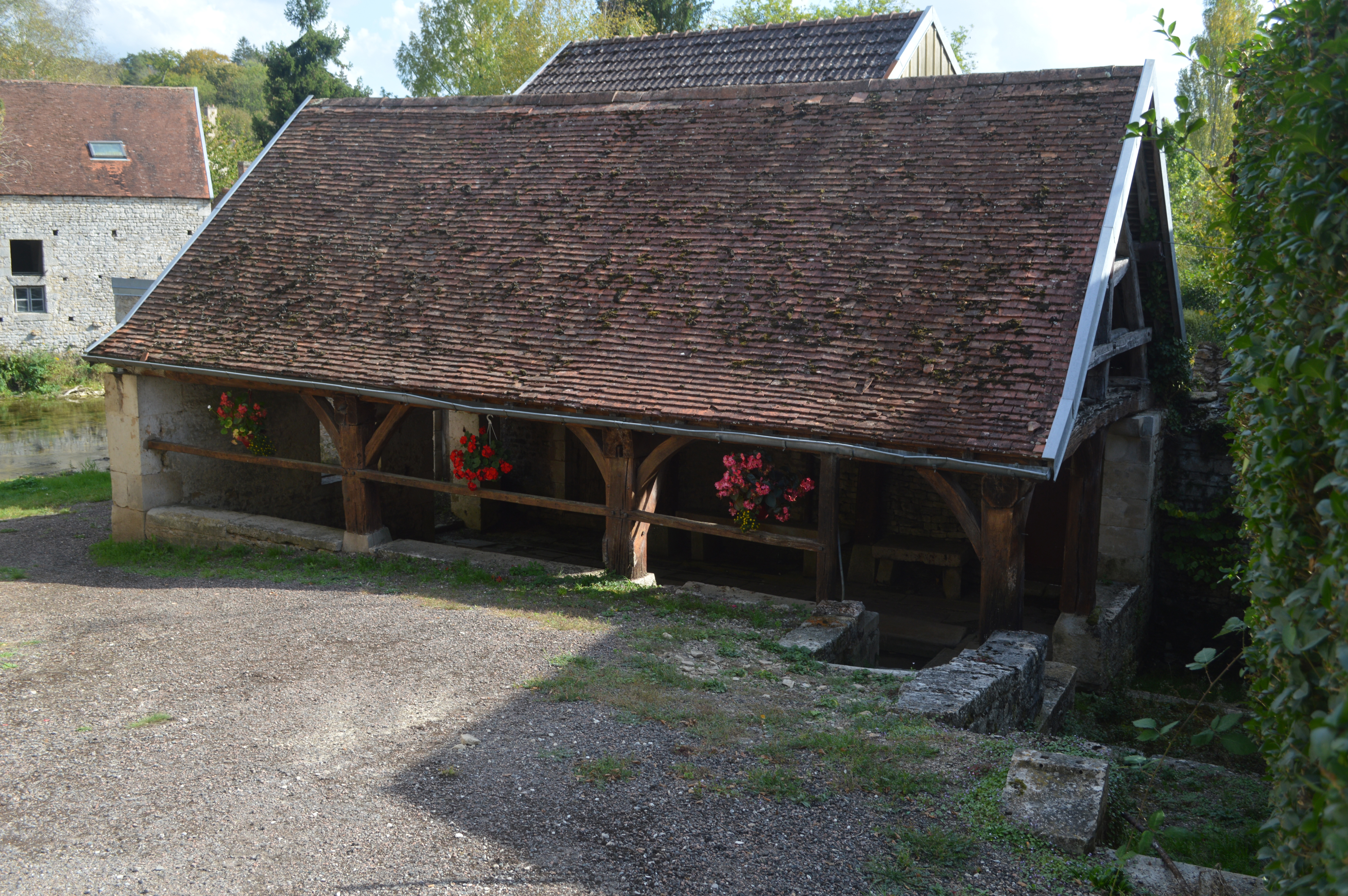
The Lavoir (Public laundry) at Rue du Pont

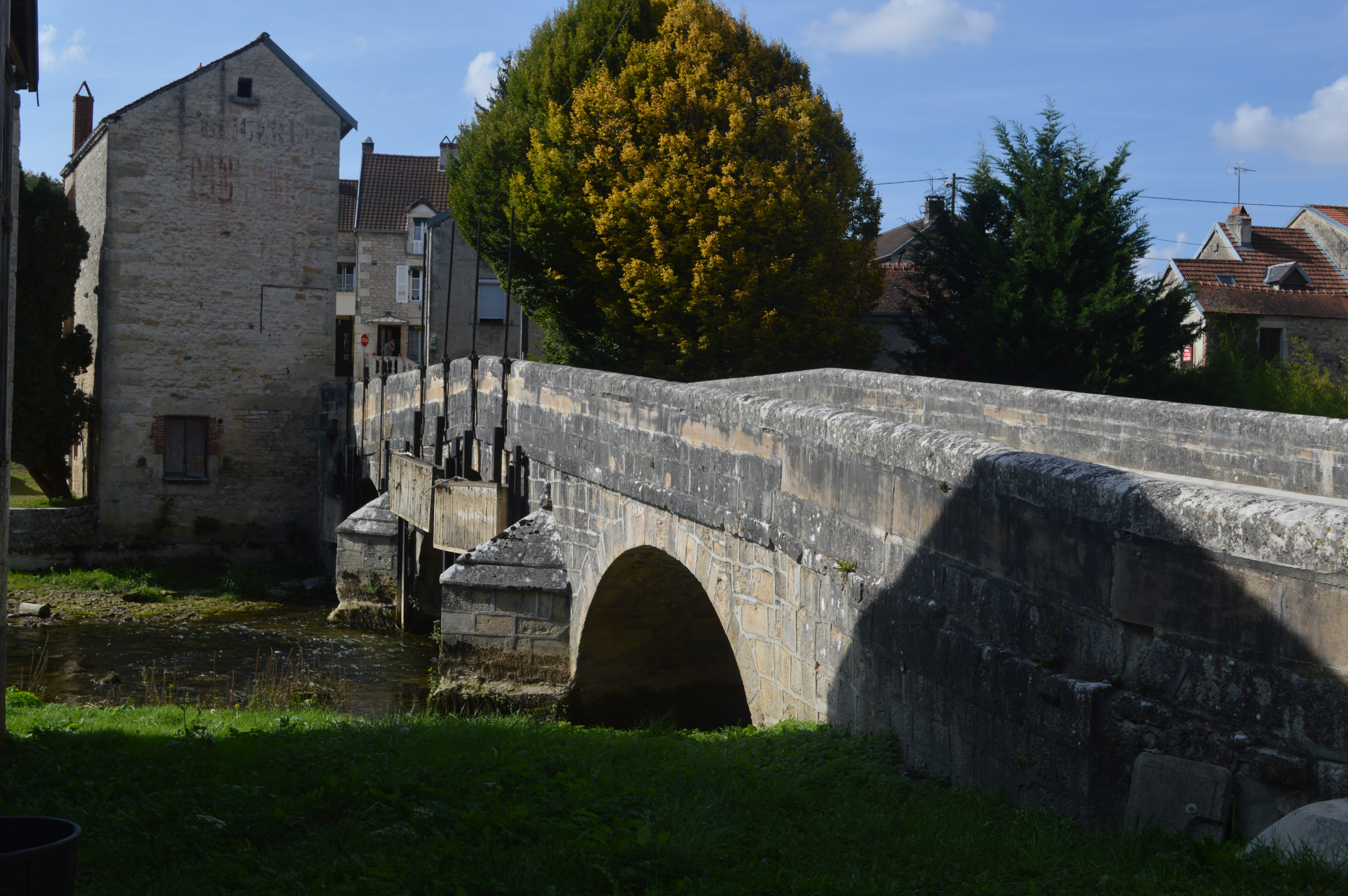
The Bridge at Rue du Pont

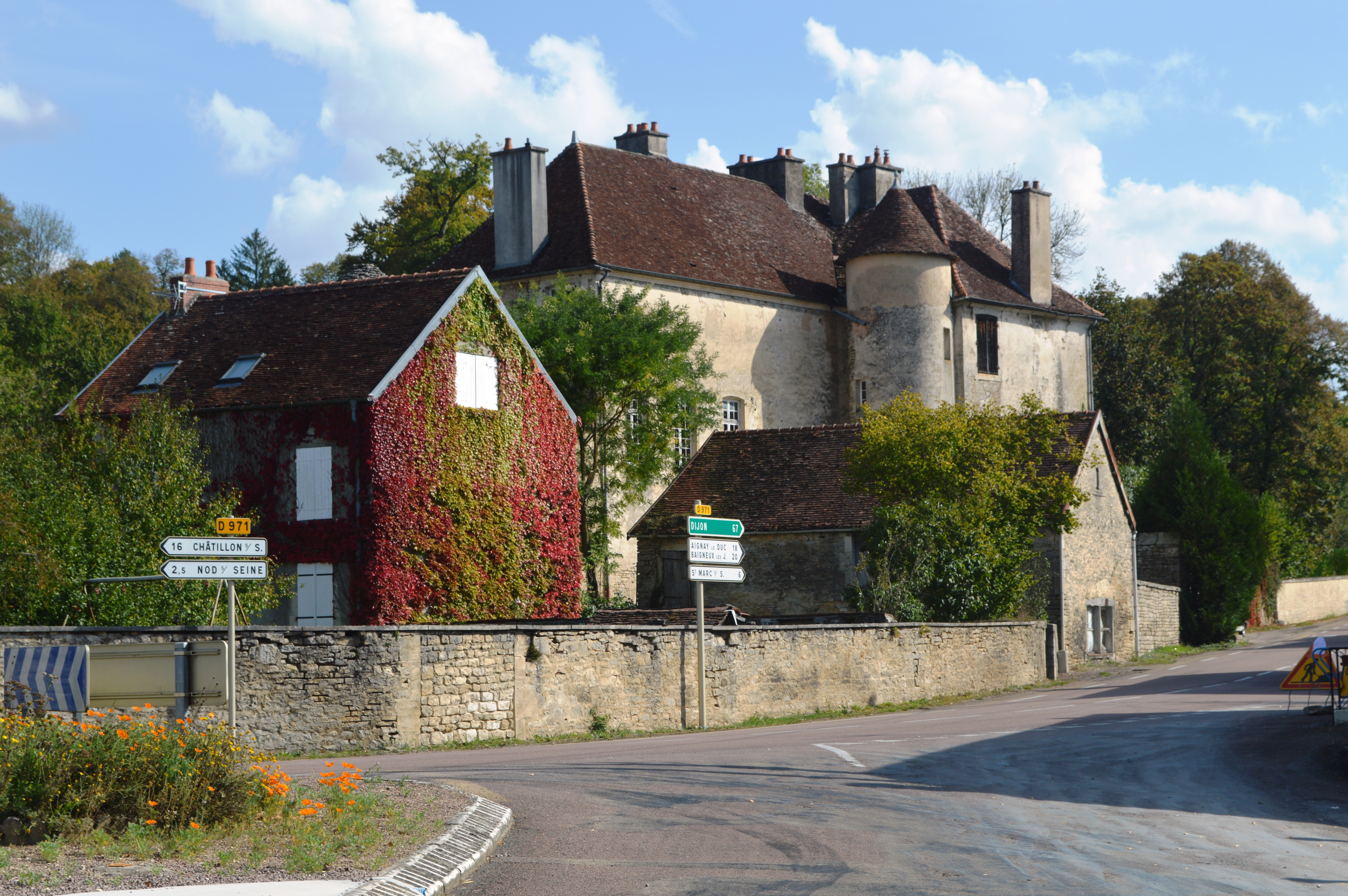
The Chateau de Tavannes

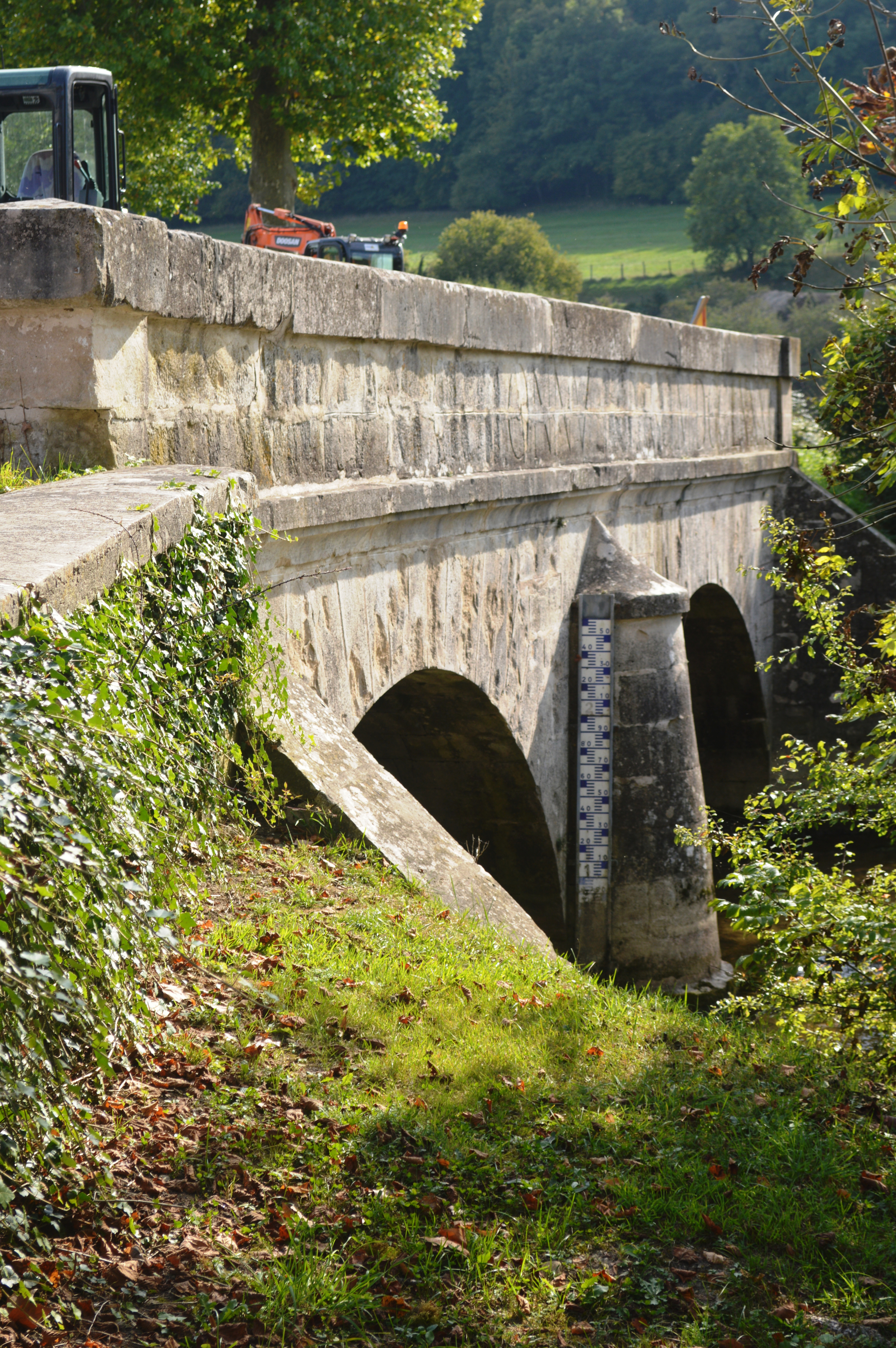
The Bridge of Troubles

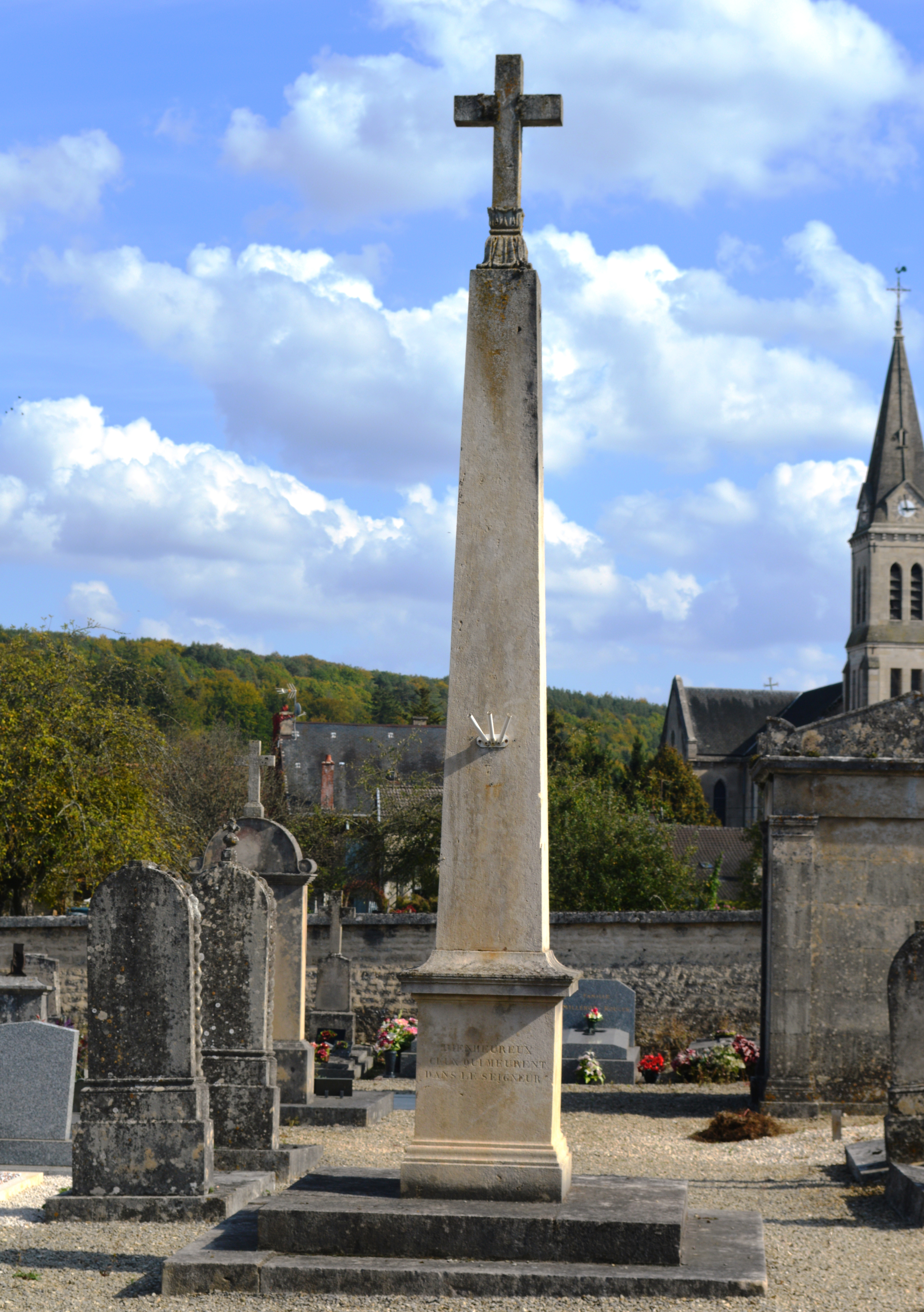
The Cemetery Cross at Chemin des Chenevières

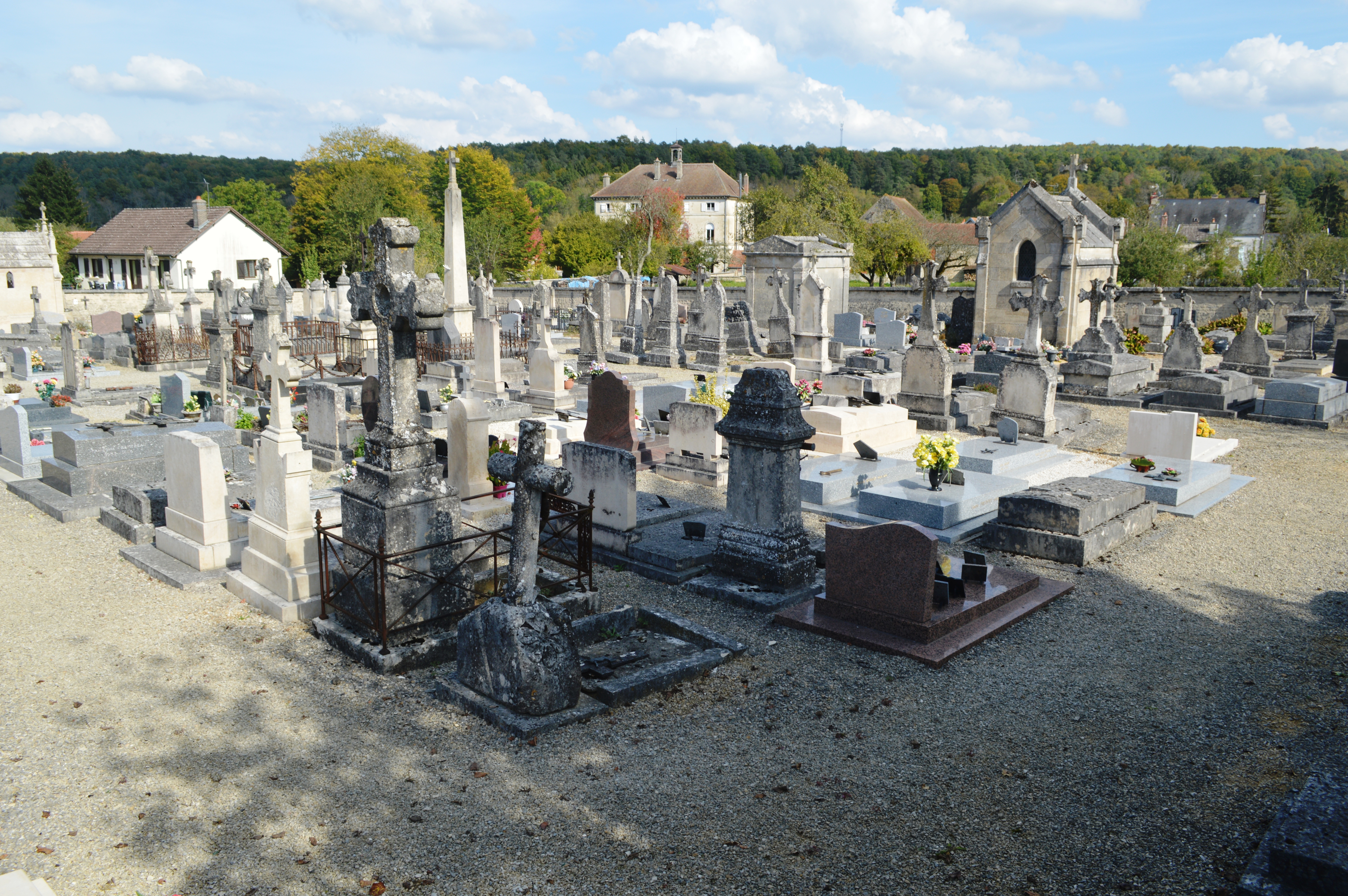
The Cemetery at Chemin des Chenevières

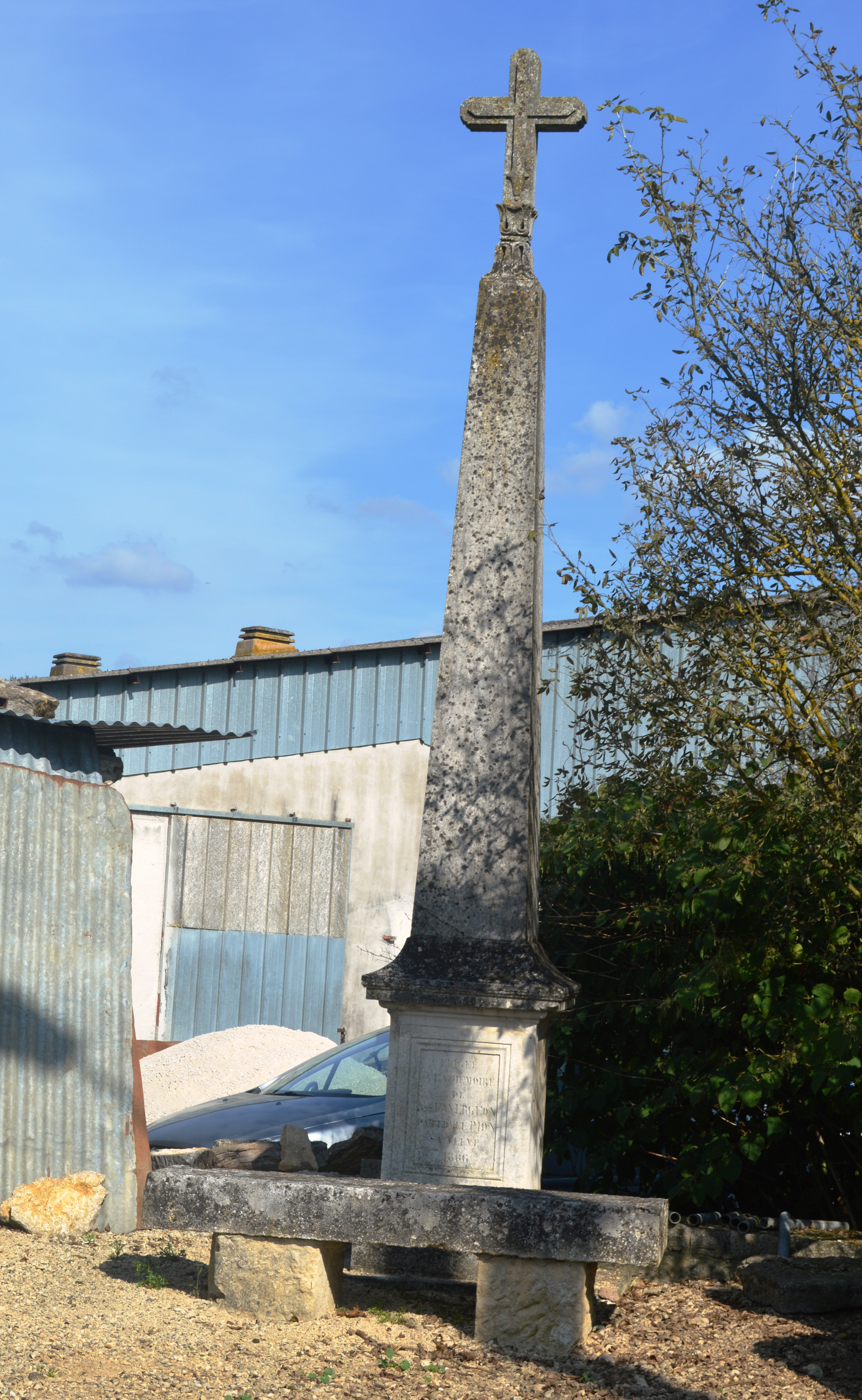
The Wayside Cross at Rue de la Poterne and CR 18 crossroads

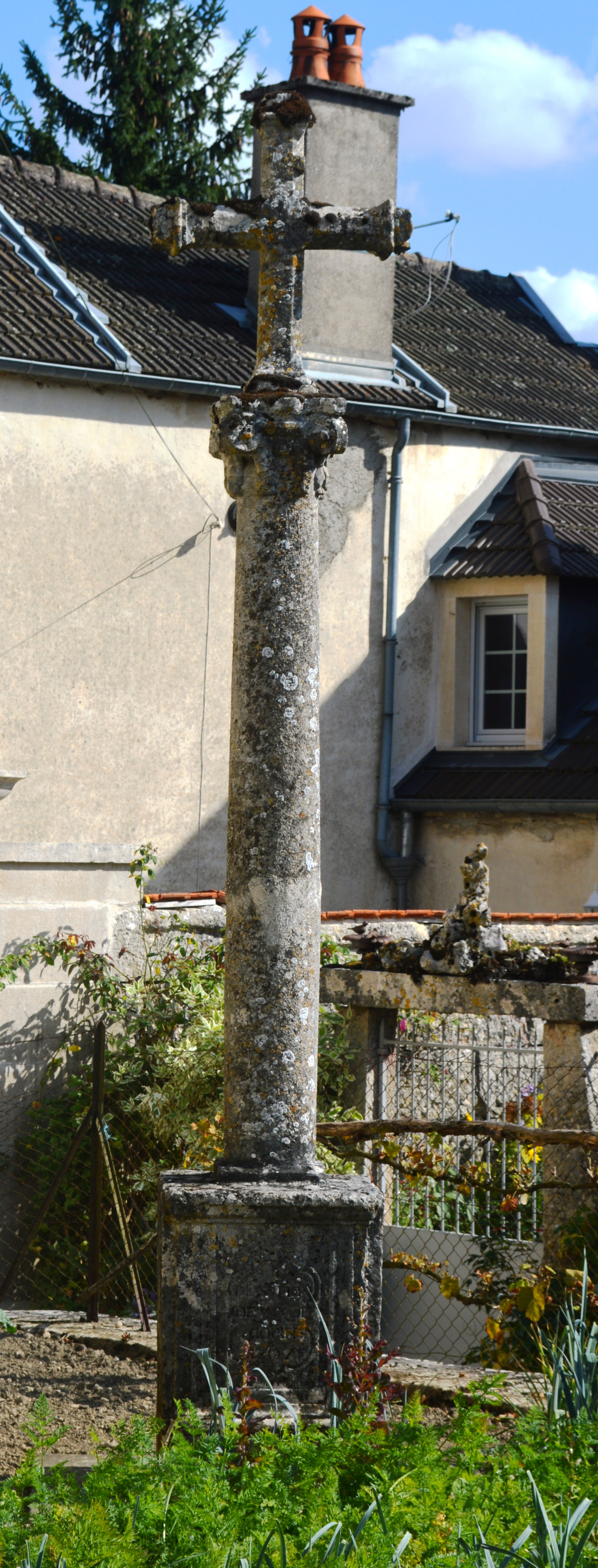
The Wayside Cross at Grande Rue

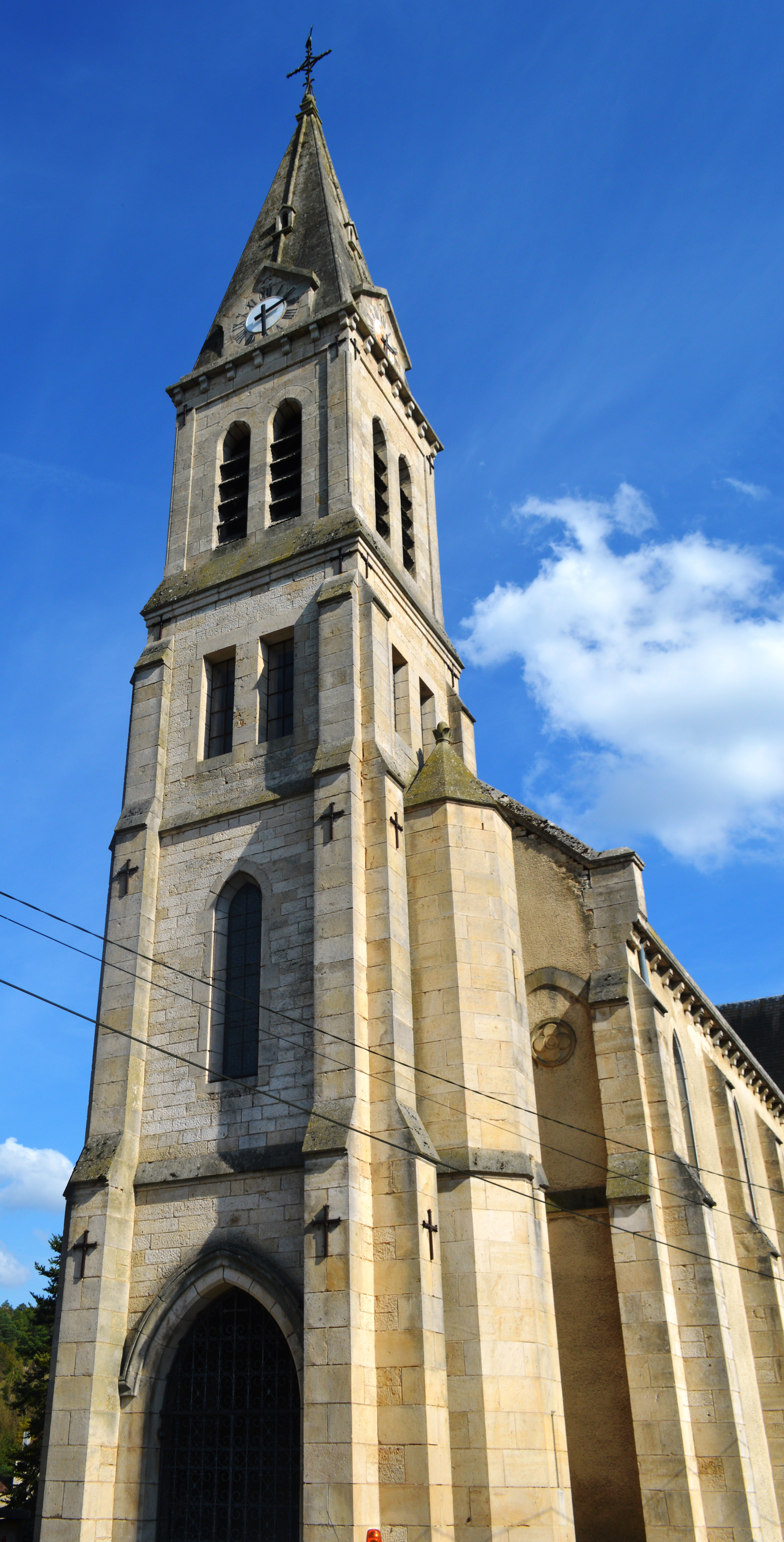
The Church of Saint-Genest

== See also ==
- Communes of the Côte-d'Or department
