= San Marcos =

San Marcos is the Spanish form of "Saint Mark".

In English, it may also refer to:

== Places ==
=== Argentina ===
- San Marcos, Salta

=== Colombia ===
- San Marcos, Antioquia
- San Marcos, Sucre

=== Costa Rica ===
- San Marcos, Costa Rica (aka San Marcos de Tarrazú)

=== Ecuador ===
- San Marcos, Quito
- San Marcos Island, a former name of Santiago Island in the Galapagos

=== El Salvador ===
- San Marcos, El Salvador

=== Guatemala ===
- San Marcos Department
- San Marcos, Guatemala

=== Honduras ===
- San Marcos de Caiquín
- San Marcos de Colón
- San Marcos, Ocotepeque
- San Marcos, Santa Bárbara

=== Mexico ===
- San Marcos, Baja California Sur
- San Marcos, Guerrero
- San Marcos, Jalisco

=== Nicaragua ===
- San Marcos, Carazo

=== Peru ===
- San Marcos, Cajamarca
- San Marcos Province

=== United States ===
- San Marcos, California
  - Lake San Marcos, California
  - California State University San Marcos (in relation to other CSU campuses)
    - Cal State San Marcos Cougars, athletics teams
- San Marcos, Texas
- San Marcos River, Texas

== Other ==
- Castillo de San Marcos in St. Augustine, Florida; massive Spanish fortification, the oldest extant masonry fort in today's United States
- FC San Marcos, Nicaraguan football club
- La Casona de San Marcos, a large colonial building in Lima, Peru
- Jardín de San Marcos, a Garden located in the Historic Centre of Aguascalientes, Mexico
- National University of San Marcos, Peru
- San Marcos de Apalache Historic State Park, Florida, U.S.; site of a 17th/18th-century Spanish fort along the Gulf Coast; utilized up through the 19th-century American Civil War
- San Marcos de Arica, Chilean football club
- San Marcos High School (Santa Barbara, California), U.S.
- San Marcos, a fictional Central American banana republic in the 1971 motion picture Bananas, in an episode of The A-Team, and in a 2014 episode of Archer
- San Marcos, León, former monastery in León
- USS San Marcos (LSD-25), a warship of the United States Navy

== See also ==
- San Marco (disambiguation)
- Saint Mark (disambiguation)
