= San Marcos, Colombia =

San Marcos, Colombia may refer to:

- San Marcos, Antioquia
- San Marcos, Sucre

== See also ==
- San Marcos (disambiguation)
