= Ampilly-le-Sec =

- Commune
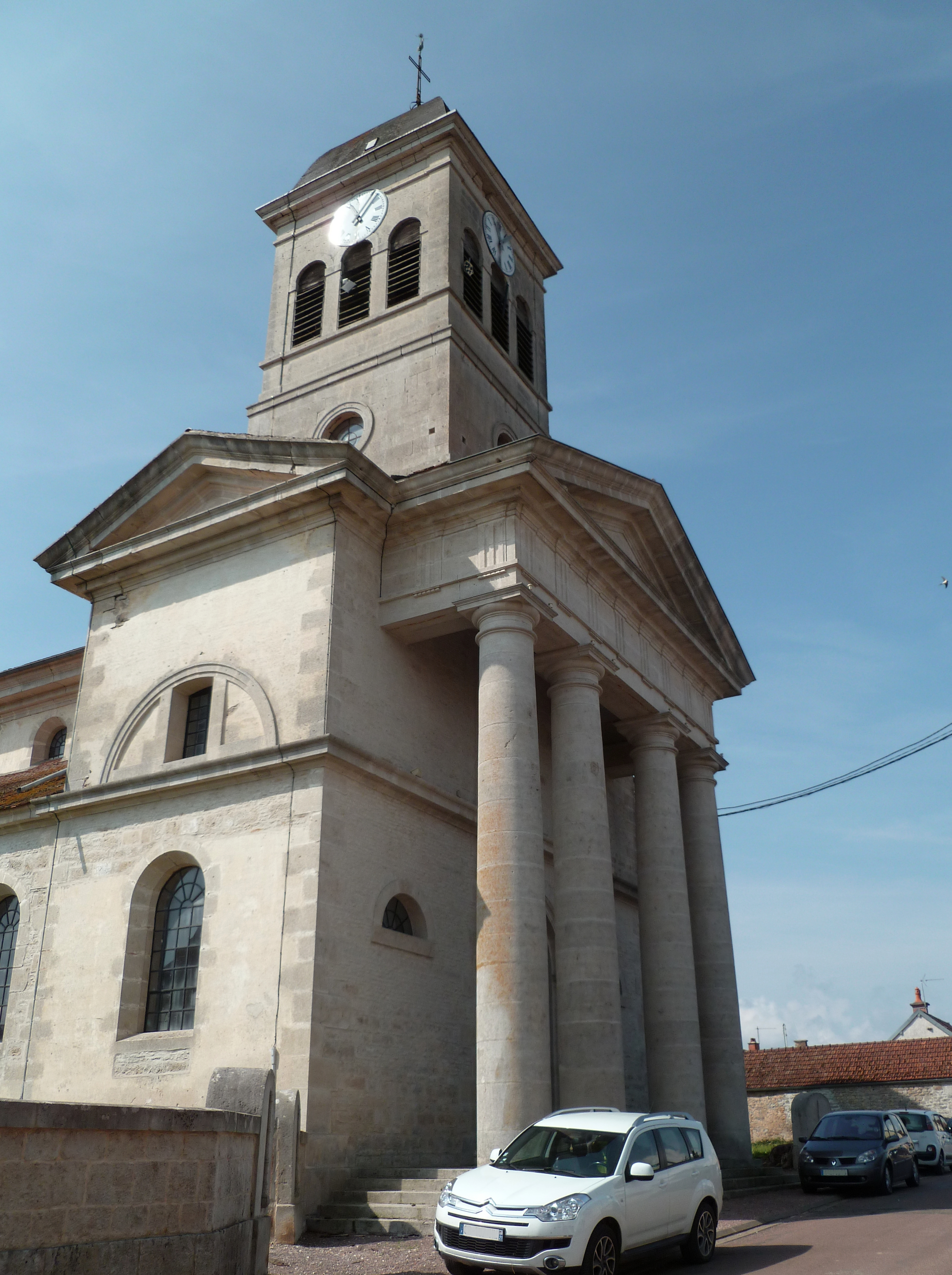
- The village church

- Coat of arms
- Location of Ampilly-le-Sec
- Location within France Location within Bourgogne-Franche-Comté
- Coordinates: 47°48′37″N 4°31′54″E
- Country: France
- Region: Bourgogne-Franche-Comté
- Department: Côte-d'Or
- Arrondissement: Montbard
- Canton: Châtillon-sur-Seine
- Intercommunality: Pays Châtillonnais

Government
  - Mayor (2020–2026): René Regnault
- Area^{1}: 24.4 km^{2} (9.4 sq mi)
- Elevation: 285 m (935 ft)
- Highest elevation: 314 m (1,030 ft)
- Lowest elevation: 231 m (758 ft)
- Population (2023): 322
  - Density: 13.2/km^{2} (34.2/sq mi)
- Time zone: UTC+01:00 (CET)
  - Summer (DST): UTC+02:00 (CEST)
- INSEE/Postal code: 21012 /21400
- ^{1} French Land Register data, which excludes lakes, ponds, glaciers > 1 km^{2} (0.386 sq mi or 247 acres) and river estuaries.

Ampilly-le-Sec is a commune in the Côte-d'Or department in the Bourgogne-Franche-Comté region of eastern France.

== Geography ==
Ampilly-le-Sec is located some 5 km south by south-west of Chatillon-sur-Seine and 15 km east by south-east of Laignes. It can be accessed by the D980 highway from Chatillon-sur-Seine which passes through the village and continues south to Coulmier-le-Sec. The D971 from Buncey to Chamesson also passes through the eastern edge of the commune. From the D971 the D29A goes west through the village then continues to the south-west. The western third of the commune is heavily forested with the rest being entirely farmland.

The Seine River passes through the east of the commune parallel to the D971 flowing from south to north.

=== Heraldry ===
Arms of Ampilly-le-Sec	Blazon: Azure, two stag's heads caboshed of Or posed in pale, in chief argent charged with three millwheels of gules.

== Administration ==
List of Successive Mayors

From	To	Name
2001	2026	René Regnault

== Demography ==
The inhabitants of the commune are known as Ampilliaciens or Ampilliaciennes alternatively Ampellois or Ampelloises in French.

Historical population

Year	Pop.	±% p.a.
1793	476	—
1821	536	+0.42%
1846	603	+0.47%
1872	577	−0.17%
1901	468	−0.72%
1926	337	−1.30%
1946	356	+0.27%
1962	353	−0.05%
1968	333	−0.97%

Year	Pop.	±% p.a.
1975	360	+1.12%
1982	384	+0.93%
1990	424	+1.25%
1999	377	−1.30%
2007	372	−0.17%
2012	366	−0.32%
2017	348	−1.00%
2023	322	−1.29%

Source: EHESS and INSEE

== Culture and heritage ==
=== Civil heritage ===
The commune has a number of buildings and structures that are registered as historical monuments:

- A Blast Furnace (1829)
- A House at Rue de Coulmier (19th century)
- A House at Rue de la Maison Commune (19th century)
- The Town Hall/School at Rue de la Maison Commune (19th century)
- An old Ironworks (1833)
- Houses (19th century)

=== Religious heritage ===
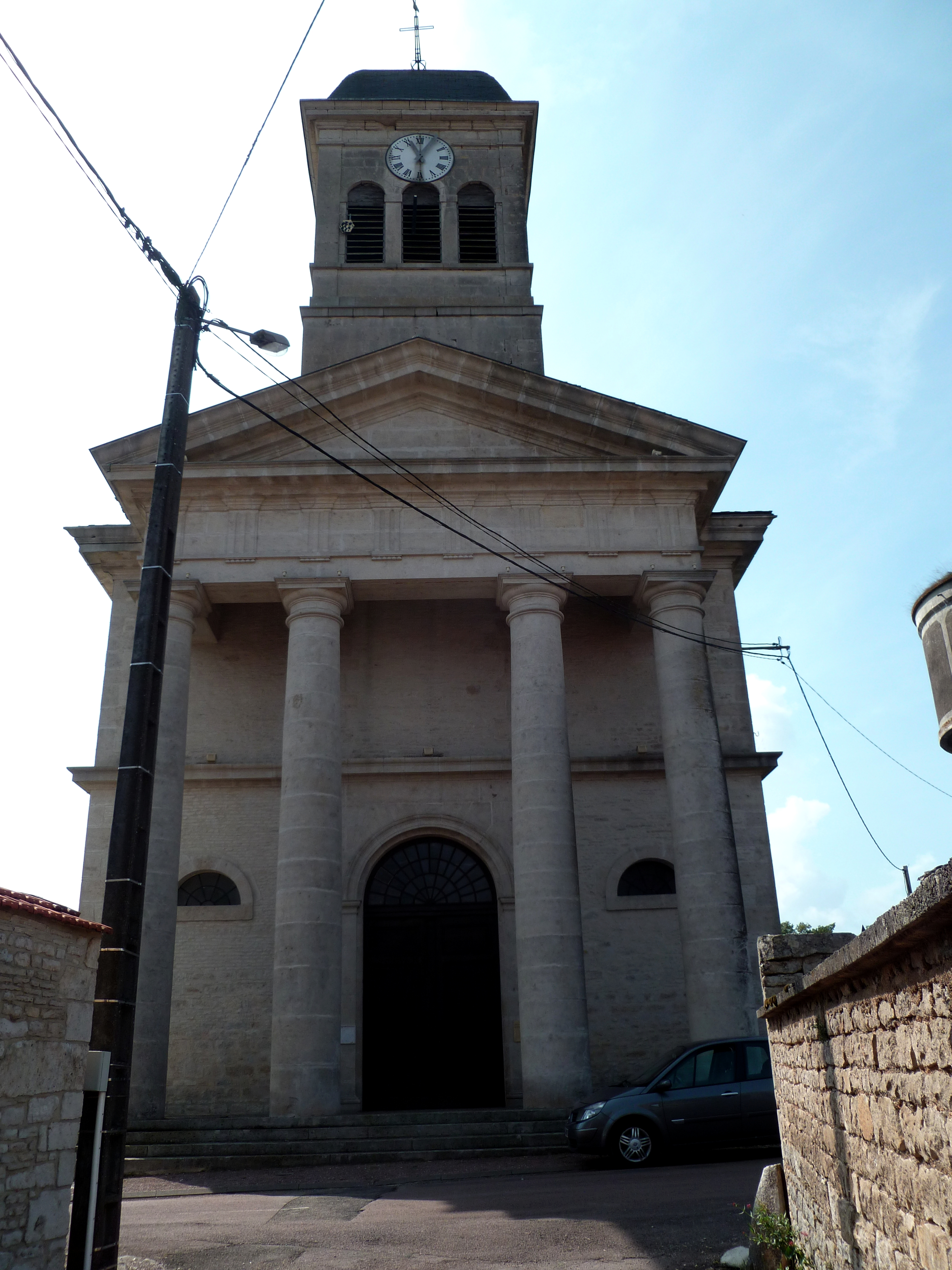
The front of the Church

The commune has several religious buildings and sites that are registered as historical monuments:

- A Wayside Cross at CR 12 (18th century)
- A Tomb at CR 25 (19th century)
- A Cemetery Cross at CR 25 (19th century)
- A Cemetery Chapel at CR 25 (19th century)
- A Wayside Cross at CR 8 (18th century)
- A Wayside Cross at CVO2 and CR32 crossroads (1840)
- A Wayside Cross at Rue de Chamesson and CR13 crossroads (1811)
- A Cemetery at Rue de l'Église (19th century)
- The Parish Church of Saint Peter and Paul at Rue de l'Église (1827). The Church contains a large number of items that are registered as historical objects.
- A Wayside Cross at RD 29a (1877)
- A Wayside Cross at RD29a and CR 25 crossroads (1762)
- A Wayside Cross at RN 71 and former Chemin de Chamesson crossroads at Vanvey (1861)
- A Wayside Cross at Grande Rue and Rue de la Croix de Mission crossroads (19th century)
- A Monumental Cross (1638)
- A Wayside Cross at Ferme de la Forêt (1783)
- A Wayside Cross at Ferme de la Forfol (18th century)

== See also ==
- Communes of the Côte-d'Or department
