= Saint-Marc (disambiguation) =

Saint-Marc is a commune in Artibonite, Haiti.

Saint-Marc may also refer to:

== Canada ==
- Saint-Marc-des-Carrières, Quebec
- Saint-Marc-de-Figuery, Quebec
- Saint-Marc-du-Lac-Long, Quebec
- Saint-Marc-sur-Richelieu, Quebec

== Haiti ==
- Saint-Marc Arrondissement, Artibonite

== France ==
- Saint-Marc-Jaumegarde, Bouches-du-Rhône
- Saint-Marc, Cantal
- Saint-Marc-sur-Seine, Côte-d'Or
- Saint-Marc-à-Frongier, Creuse
- Saint-Marc-à-Loubaud, Creuse
- Saint-Marc-la-Lande, Deux-Sèvres
- Saint-Marc-le-Blanc, Ille-et-Vilaine
- Saint-Marc-sur-Couesnon, Ille-et-Vilaine
- Saint-Marc-du-Cor, Loir-et-Cher
- Saint-Marc-sur-Mer, Loire-Atlantique

== See also ==
- Saint Mark (disambiguation)
- San Marco (disambiguation)
