= San Marcos Airport, Sucre =

San Marcos Airport
- IATA: SRS; ICAO: SKSR

Summary
- Airport type: Public
- Serves: San Marcos
- Elevation AMSL: 140 ft / 43 m
- Coordinates: 8°41′25″N 75°09′35″W

Map
- Location of the airport in Colombia

Runways
Direction	Length		Surface
Direction	m	ft	Surface
11/29	1,610	5,282	Grass
- Sources: GCM Google Maps

San Marcos Airport (IATA: SRS, ICAO: SKSR) is an airport serving the town of San Marcos, in the Sucre Department of Colombia. The runway is 4 kilometres (2.5 mi) northwest of the town.

== See also ==
- Transport in Colombia
- List of airports in Colombia
