= Chemin-d'Aisey =

- Commune
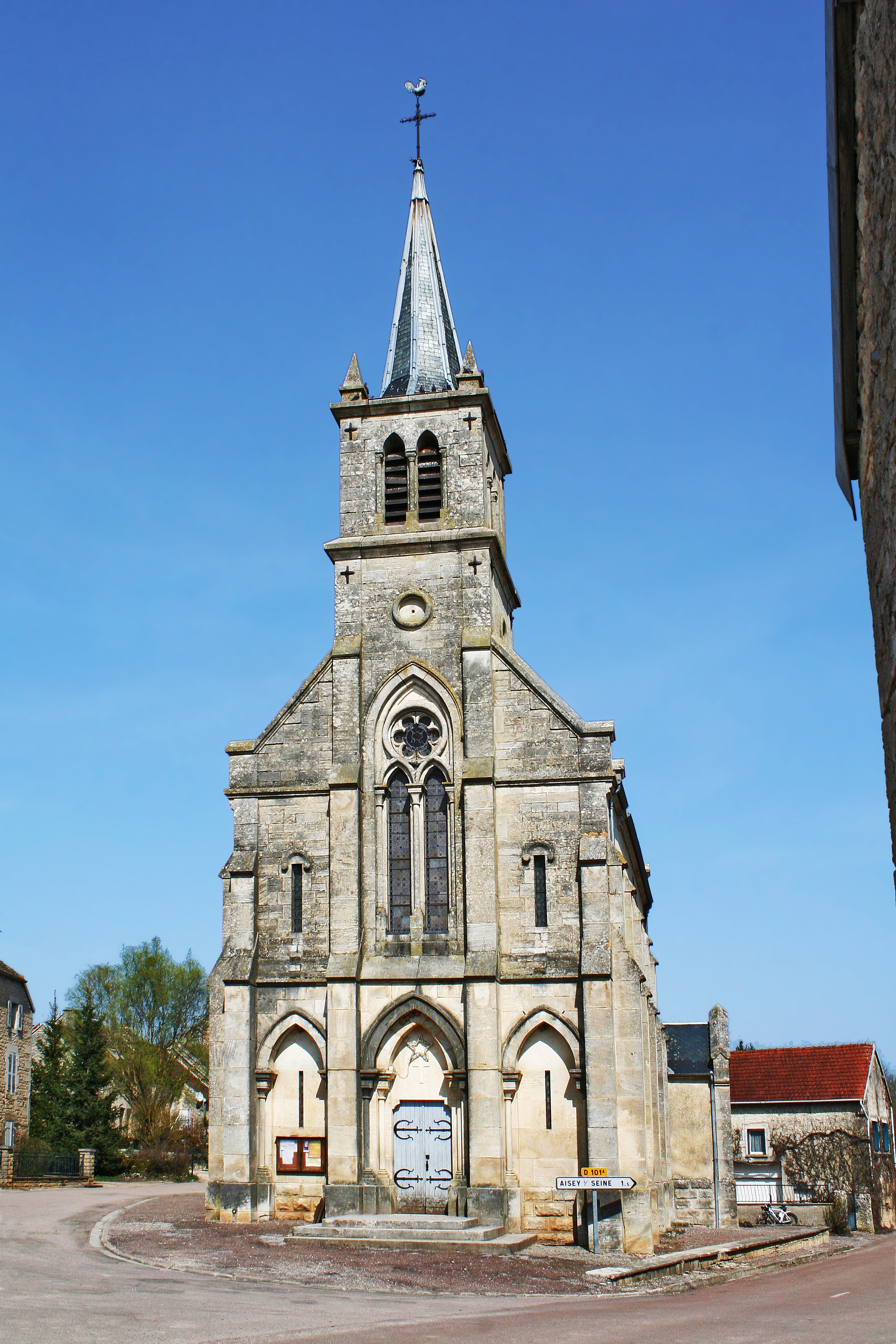
- The church in Chemin-d'Aisey

- Coat of arms
- Location of Chemin-d'Aisey
- Location within France Location within Bourgogne-Franche-Comté
- Coordinates: 47°44′31″N 4°33′56″E
- Country: France
- Region: Bourgogne-Franche-Comté
- Department: Côte-d'Or
- Arrondissement: Montbard
- Canton: Châtillon-sur-Seine
- Intercommunality: Pays Châtillonnais

Government
  - Mayor (2020–2026): Jean-Pierre Moiret
- Area^{1}: 8.51 km^{2} (3.29 sq mi)
- Elevation: 317 m (1,040 ft)
- Highest elevation: 389 m (1,276 ft)
- Lowest elevation: 290 m (950 ft)
- Population (2023): 62
  - Density: 7.3/km^{2} (19/sq mi)
- Time zone: UTC+01:00 (CET)
  - Summer (DST): UTC+02:00 (CEST)
- INSEE/Postal code: 21165 /21400
- ^{1} French Land Register data, which excludes lakes, ponds, glaciers > 1 km^{2} (0.386 sq mi or 247 acres) and river estuaries.

Chemin-d'Aisey (French pronunciation: [ʃəmɛ̃ dɛzɛ], literally Way of Aisey) is a commune in the Côte-d'Or department in eastern France.

== Population ==
Historical population
Year	Pop.	±% p.a.
1968	114	—
1975	83	−4.43%
1982	67	−3.01%
1990	80	+2.24%
1999	70	−1.47%
2007	55	−2.97%
2012	70	+4.94%
2017	71	+0.28%
2023	62	−2.23%
Source: INSEE

== See also ==
- Communes of the Côte-d'Or department
