= San Marco (disambiguation) =

San Marco, the Italian form of Saint Mark, is one of the six sestieri of Venice. It may also refer to:

== Buildings and structures ==
Italy

- San Marco, Florence, a church and convent complex
  - Piazza San Marco, Florence, in front of the complex
- San Marco, Milan, or Church of St. Mark
- San Marco, Rome, a basilica
- St Mark's Basilica, or Basilica di San Marco a Venezia, in the San Marco district of Venice
  - Piazza San Marco, or St. Mark's Square, in front of the basilica

Kenya

- San Marco platform, a launch platform of the Broglio Space Centre

United States

- San Marco (Spokane, Washington), a historic building listed on the U.S. National Register of Historic Places

== Places ==
Italy

- San Marco, is one of six districts (sestiere) of the city of Venice, Italy
- San Marco, Castellabate, a village of Castellabate (SA), Campania
- Albaredo per San Marco, a municipality in the Province of Sondrio, Lombardy
- Caerano di San Marco, a municipality in the Province of Treviso, Veneto
- Cellino San Marco, a municipality in the Province of Brindisi, Apulia
- San Marco Argentano, a municipality in the Province of Cosenza, Calabria
- San Marco d'Alunzio, a municipality in the Province of Messina, Sicily
- San Marco dei Cavoti, a municipality in the Province of Benevento, Campania
- San Marco Evangelista, a municipality in the Province of Caserta, Campania
- San Marco in Lamis, a municipality in the Province of Foggia, Apulia
- San Marco la Catola, a municipality in the Province of Foggia, Apulia
- San Marco Pass, a mountain pass in the Bergamo Alps

United States

- San Marco (Jacksonville), a neighborhood of Jacksonville, Florida
  - San Marco station, a transit station in Jacksonville

== Ships ==
- Italian cruiser San Marco, an Italian armoured cruiser built in 1908
- SS San Marco, a German freighter sunk in the Battle of the Duisburg Convoy during the Second World War
- San Marco, a San Giorgio-class amphibious transport dock in the Italian Navy

== Other ==
- San Marco programme, an Italian-US satellite programme
- San Marco Regiment, the marines of the Italian Navy
- Republic of San Marco, 1848–1849 Italian revolutionary state
- San Marco (board game), a board game by Alan R. Moon and Aaron Weissblum
- Jennifer San Marco (1961-2006), American spree killer and perpetrator of the Goleta postal facility shootings

== See also ==
- Saint-Marc (disambiguation)
- Saint Mark (disambiguation)
- San Marcos (disambiguation)
- São Marcos
