= Sveti Marko =

Sveti Marko (Serbo-Croatian, Slovenian and Macedonian for "Saint Mark") may refer to:

- Sveti Marko Island, an island in Montenegro
- Sveti Marko Island, Brijuni, an island in Croatia
- Sveti Marko Island, Kvarner, an island in Croatia
- Selo Sveti Marko, a village in Croatia
- Ostenk, a settlement in the municipality of Trbovlje, Slovenia, known as Sveti Marko until 1955

== See also ==
- Saint Mark (disambiguation)
