= Nod-sur-Seine =

- Commune
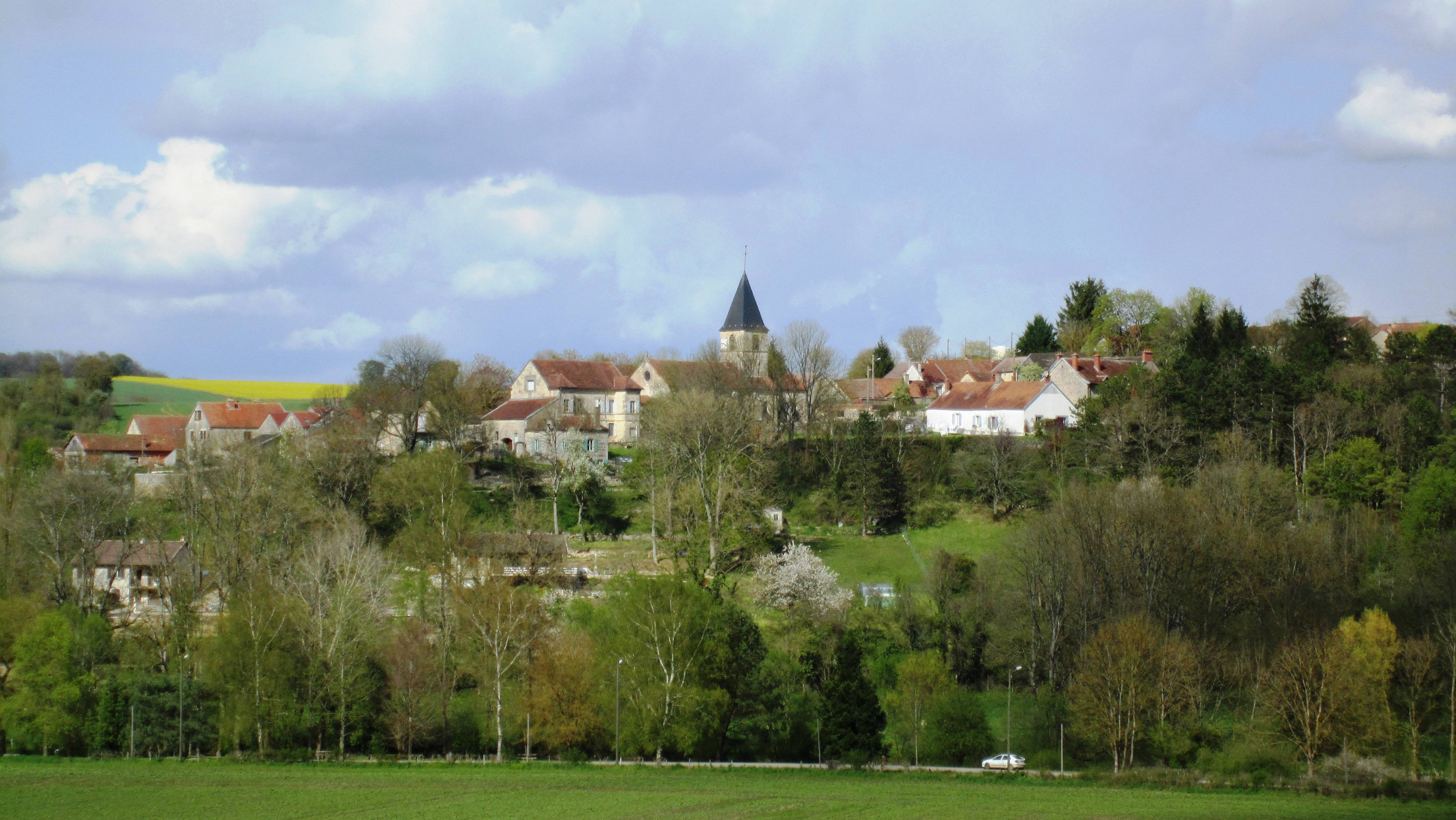
- A general view of Nod-sur-Seine

- Coat of arms
- Location of Nod-sur-Seine
- Location within France Location within Bourgogne-Franche-Comté
- Coordinates: 47°46′02″N 4°34′23″E
- Country: France
- Region: Bourgogne-Franche-Comté
- Department: Côte-d'Or
- Arrondissement: Montbard
- Canton: Châtillon-sur-Seine
- Intercommunality: Pays Châtillonnais

Government
  - Mayor (2020–2026): Dominique Bayen
- Area^{1}: 24.86 km^{2} (9.60 sq mi)
- Elevation: 256 m (840 ft)
- Highest elevation: 384 m (1,260 ft)
- Lowest elevation: 244 m (801 ft)
- Population (2023): 204
  - Density: 8.21/km^{2} (21.3/sq mi)
- Time zone: UTC+01:00 (CET)
  - Summer (DST): UTC+02:00 (CEST)
- INSEE/Postal code: 21455 /21400
- ^{1} French Land Register data, which excludes lakes, ponds, glaciers > 1 km^{2} (0.386 sq mi or 247 acres) and river estuaries.

Nod-sur-Seine (French pronunciation: [no syʁ sɛn], literally Nod on Seine) is a commune in the Côte-d'Or department in eastern France.

== Population ==
Historical population
Year	Pop.	±% p.a.
1968	252	—
1975	183	−4.47%
1982	199	+1.20%
1990	212	+0.79%
1999	258	+2.21%
2007	261	+0.14%
2012	234	−2.16%
2017	210	−2.14%
2023	204	−0.48%
Source: INSEE

== See also ==
- Communes of the Côte-d'Or department
