= Saint-Germain-le-Rocheux =

- Commune
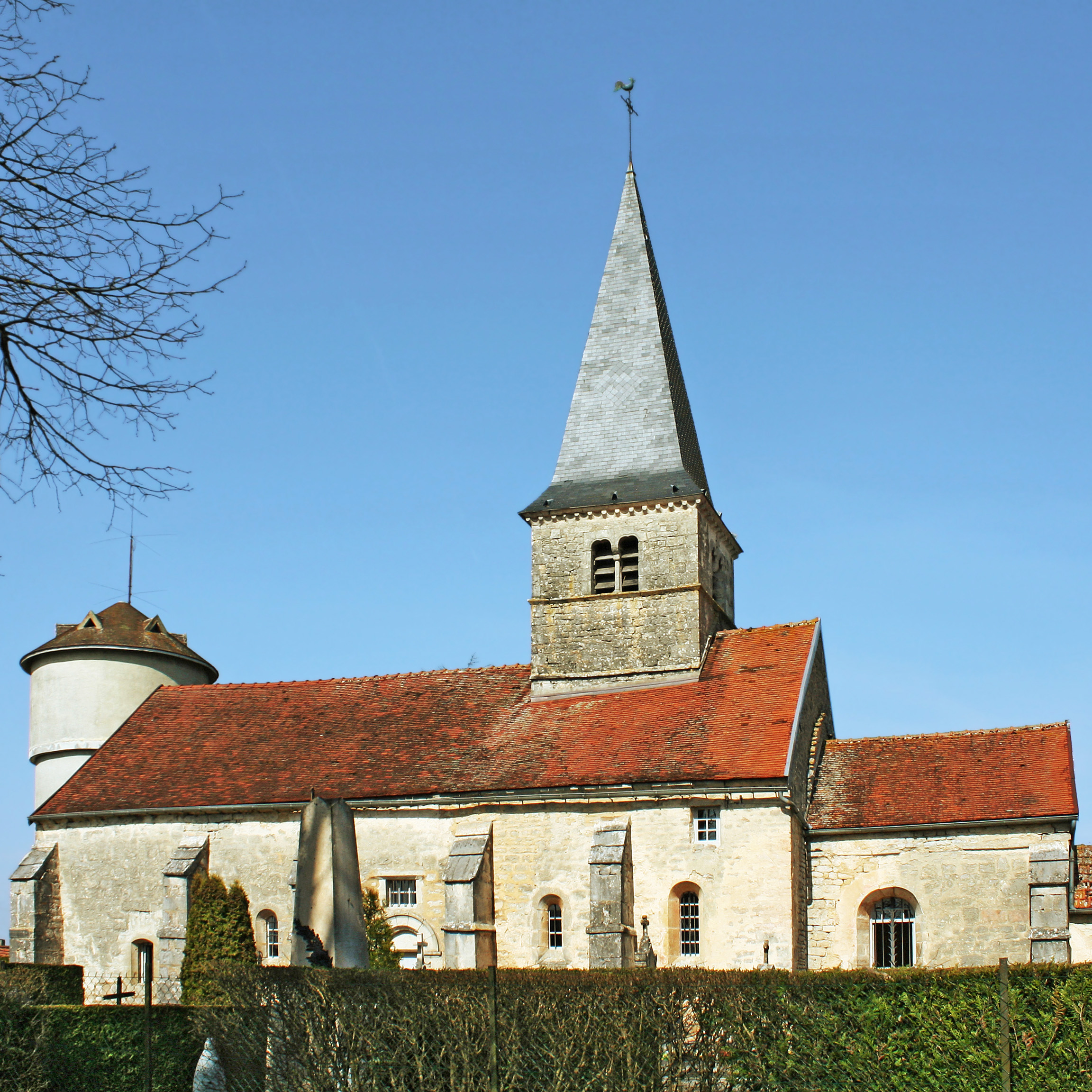
- The church in Saint-Germain-le-Rocheux

- Coat of arms
- Location of Saint-Germain-le-Rocheux
- Location within France Location within Bourgogne-Franche-Comté
- Coordinates: 47°45′05″N 4°40′12″E
- Country: France
- Region: Bourgogne-Franche-Comté
- Department: Côte-d'Or
- Arrondissement: Montbard
- Canton: Châtillon-sur-Seine
- Intercommunality: Pays Châtillonnais

Government
  - Mayor (2020–2026): Clémence Legendre
- Area^{1}: 7.66 km^{2} (2.96 sq mi)
- Elevation: 375 m (1,230 ft)
- Highest elevation: 393 m (1,289 ft)
- Lowest elevation: 277 m (909 ft)
- Population (2023): 83
  - Density: 11/km^{2} (28/sq mi)
- Time zone: UTC+01:00 (CET)
  - Summer (DST): UTC+02:00 (CEST)
- INSEE/Postal code: 21549 /21510
- ^{1} French Land Register data, which excludes lakes, ponds, glaciers > 1 km^{2} (0.386 sq mi or 247 acres) and river estuaries.

Saint-Germain-le-Rocheux (French pronunciation: [sɛ̃ ʒɛʁmɛ̃ lə ʁɔʃø]) is a commune in the Côte-d'Or department in eastern France.

== History ==
Before the Roman Empire, Saint-Germain-le-Rocheux was populated by Celtic polytheists. A Roman temple was built on top of an Iron Age Celtic sacred site.

== Population ==
Historical population
| Year | Pop. | ±% p.a. |
|---|---|---|
| 1968 | 147 | — |
| 1975 | 149 | +0.19% |
| 1982 | 116 | −3.51% |
| 1990 | 108 | −0.89% |
| 1999 | 102 | −0.63% |
| 2007 | 95 | −0.88% |
| 2012 | 85 | −2.20% |
| 2017 | 80 | −1.21% |
| 2023 | 83 | +0.62% |
Source: INSEE

== See also ==
- Communes of the Côte-d'Or department
