= Saint Mark (disambiguation) =

Saint Mark, or Mark the Evangelist, is the traditional author of the Gospel of Mark.

Saint Mark may also refer to:

== People ==
- Pope Mark (died 336), Pope from January 18 to October 7, 336
- Sts. Mark and Marcellian (died c. 286), martyrs venerated as saints
- St. Mark of Aeca (died c. 328), a Catholic bishop commemorated on November 5
- St. Mark of Ephesus, an Eastern Orthodox bishop commemorated on 19 January
- St. Mark the Ascetic, a Christian hermit commemorated on 20 May
- St. Mark Ji Tianxiang (died 1900), one of the Martyr Saints of China

== Places ==
- St. Mark Coptic Orthodox Church (Jersey City, New Jersey), U.S.
- St. Mark Coptic Orthodox Church (Los Angeles), California, U.S.
- Saint Mark Parish, Dominica
- Saint Mark Parish, Grenada

== Artworks ==
- Saint Mark (Donatello)
- Saint Mark (Mantegna)
- Saint Mark (Tzanes)

== See also ==
- St. Mark's (disambiguation)
- Saint-Marc (disambiguation)
- San Marco (disambiguation)
- Sveti Marko (disambiguation)
