= San Marcos, Sucre =

Coordinates: 8°39′40″N 75°08′05″W

- Municipality and town
- Flag

- Location of the municipality and town of San Marcos, Sucre in the Sucre Department of Colombia.
- Country: Colombia
- Department: Sucre Department

Area
  - Municipality and town: 970.4 km^{2} (374.7 sq mi)
  - Urban: 7.06 km^{2} (2.73 sq mi)

Population (2020 est.)
  - Municipality and town: 60,735
  - Density: 62.59/km^{2} (162.1/sq mi)
  - Urban: 33,366
  - Urban density: 4,730/km^{2} (12,200/sq mi)
- Time zone: UTC-5 (Colombia Standard Time)

San Marcos is a town and municipality located in the Sucre Department, northern Colombia. It is also called "La Perla del San Jorge".

There is not Airport in the town.

== Climate ==
Climate data for San Marcos (San Marcos Airport), elevation 30 m (98 ft), (1971–2000)
Month	Jan	Feb	Mar	Apr	May	Jun	Jul	Aug	Sep	Oct	Nov	Dec	Year
Mean daily maximum °C (°F)	32.9 (91.2)	33.6 (92.5)	34.2 (93.6)	33.5 (92.3)	32.5 (90.5)	32.3 (90.1)	32.2 (90.0)	32.5 (90.5)	32.1 (89.8)	31.6 (88.9)	31.9 (89.4)	32.5 (90.5)	32.6 (90.7)
Daily mean °C (°F)	28.2 (82.8)	28.3 (82.9)	28.6 (83.5)	28.6 (83.5)	28.2 (82.8)	28.0 (82.4)	28.1 (82.6)	27.9 (82.2)	27.9 (82.2)	27.3 (81.1)	27.7 (81.9)	27.8 (82.0)	28 (82)
Mean daily minimum °C (°F)	21.9 (71.4)	22.3 (72.1)	22.5 (72.5)	23.0 (73.4)	23.0 (73.4)	22.6 (72.7)	22.4 (72.3)	22.5 (72.5)	22.7 (72.9)	22.4 (72.3)	22.6 (72.7)	22.3 (72.1)	22.5 (72.5)
Average precipitation mm (inches)	7.7 (0.30)	23.9 (0.94)	26.9 (1.06)	121.4 (4.78)	177.4 (6.98)	211.0 (8.31)	217.0 (8.54)	236.8 (9.32)	244.1 (9.61)	239.2 (9.42)	119.9 (4.72)	34.5 (1.36)	1,659.7 (65.34)
Average precipitation days	2	2	3	10	13	14	16	17	17	16	12	5	126
Average relative humidity (%)	79	76	76	79	81	83	83	84	84	85	85	80	81
Mean monthly sunshine hours	241.8	186.6	192.2	147.0	161.2	162.0	204.6	207.7	174.0	145.7	183.0	213.9	2,219.7
Mean daily sunshine hours	7.8	6.6	6.2	4.9	5.2	5.4	6.6	6.7	5.8	4.7	6.1	6.9	6.1
Source: Instituto de Hidrologia Meteorologia y Estudios Ambientales
