= Saint-Marc-sur-Seine =

- Commune
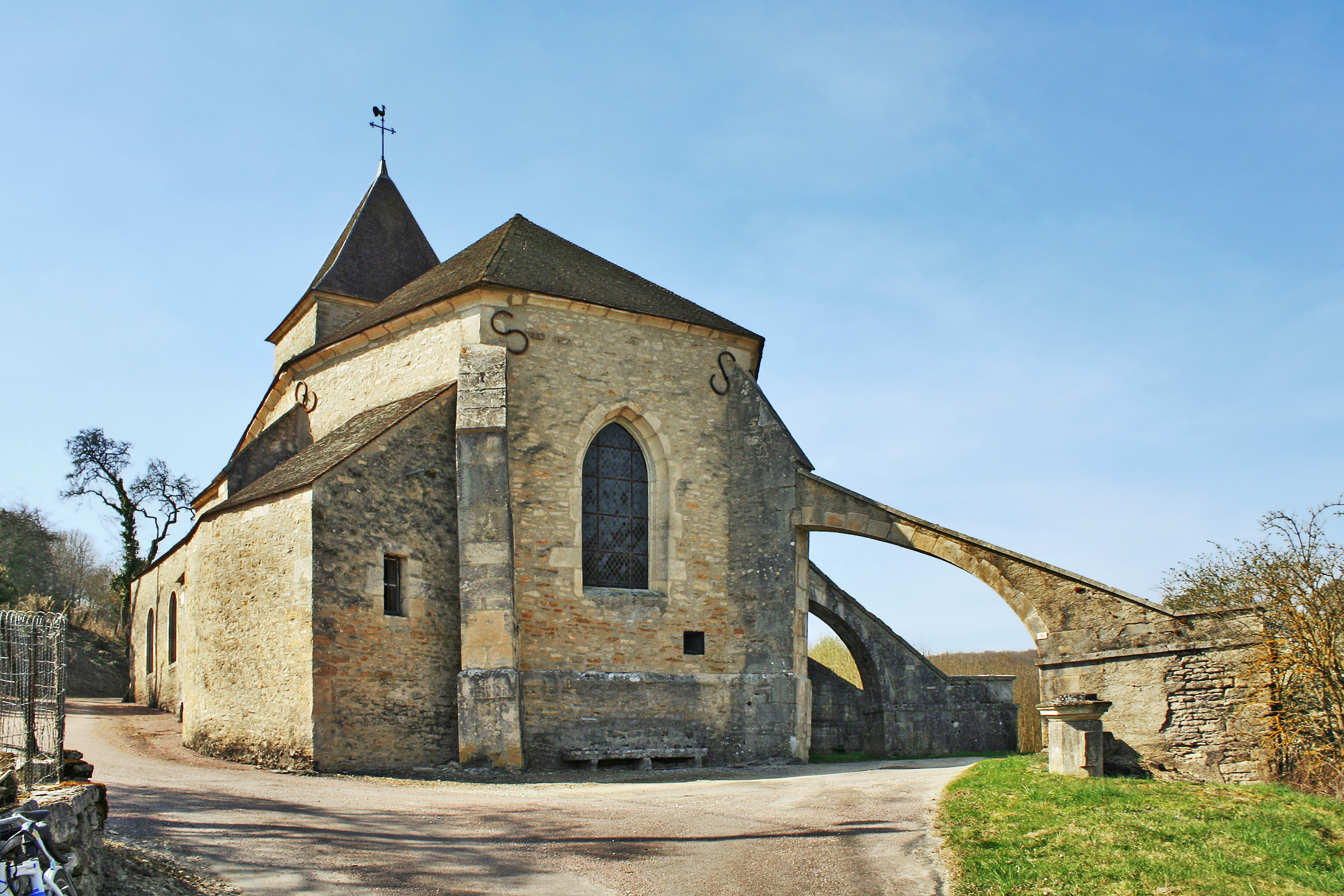
- The church in Saint-Marc-sur-Seine

- Coat of arms
- Location of Saint-Marc-sur-Seine
- Location within France Location within Bourgogne-Franche-Comté
- Coordinates: 47°42′06″N 4°36′20″E
- Country: France
- Region: Bourgogne-Franche-Comté
- Department: Côte-d'Or
- Arrondissement: Montbard
- Canton: Châtillon-sur-Seine
- Intercommunality: Pays Châtillonnais

Government
  - Mayor (2020–2026): Vincent Chauvot
- Area^{1}: 8.4 km^{2} (3.2 sq mi)
- Elevation: 272 m (892 ft)
- Highest elevation: 411 m (1,348 ft)
- Lowest elevation: 265 m (869 ft)
- Population (2023): 113
  - Density: 13/km^{2} (35/sq mi)
- Time zone: UTC+01:00 (CET)
  - Summer (DST): UTC+02:00 (CEST)
- INSEE/Postal code: 21557 /21450
- ^{1} French Land Register data, which excludes lakes, ponds, glaciers > 1 km^{2} (0.386 sq mi or 247 acres) and river estuaries.

Saint-Marc-sur-Seine (French pronunciation: [sɛ̃ maʁk syʁ sɛn], lit. 'Saint Marc on Seine') is a commune in the Côte-d'Or department in eastern France.

== Population ==
Historical population
Year	Pop.	±% p.a.
1968	299	—
1975	244	−2.86%
1982	223	−1.28%
1990	194	−1.73%
1999	147	−3.04%
2007	124	−2.10%
2012	117	−1.16%
2017	107	−1.77%
2023	113	+0.91%
Source: INSEE

== See also ==
- Communes of the Côte-d'Or department
