= Chamesson =

- Commune
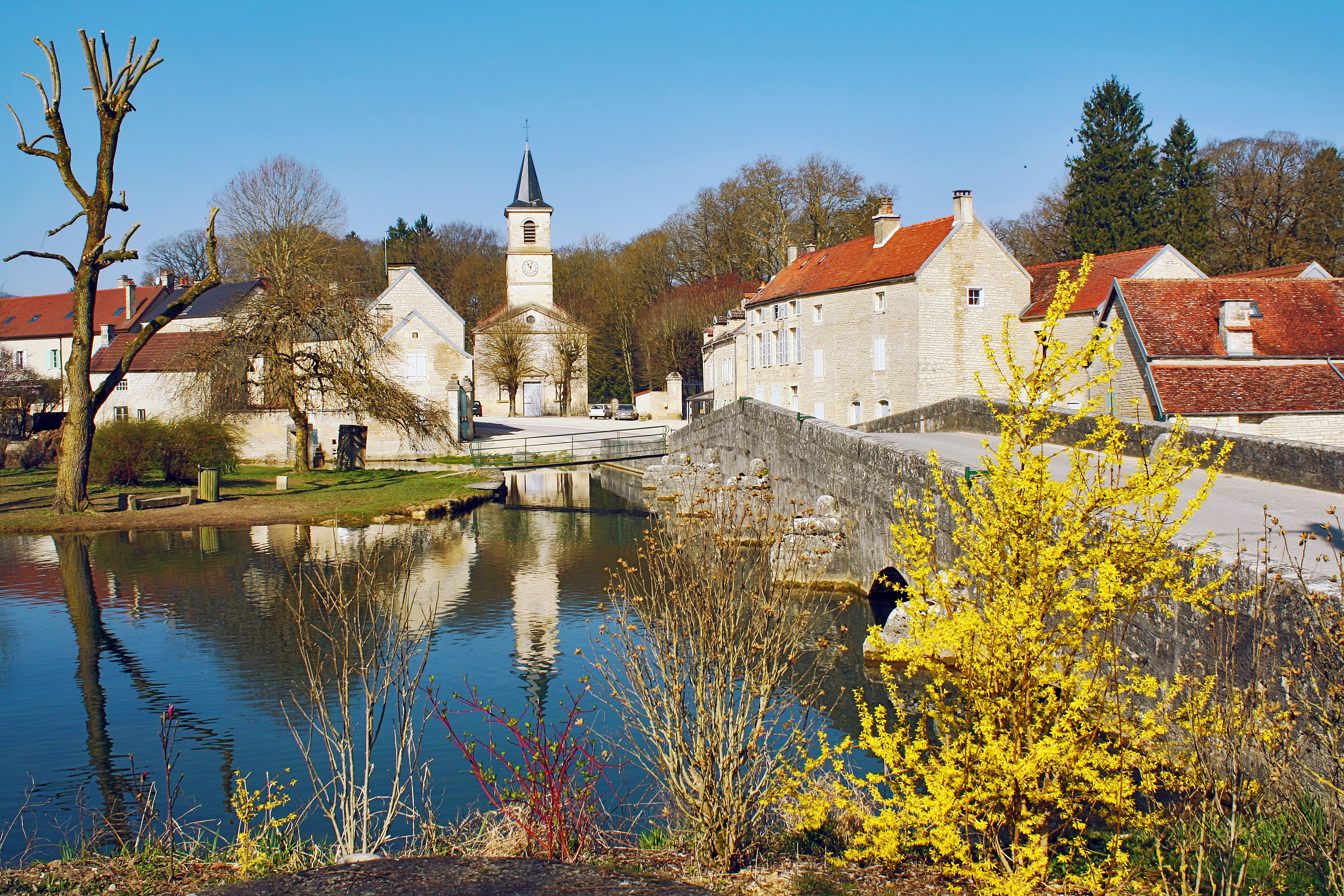
- The village in springtime

- Coat of arms
- Location of Chamesson
- Location within France Location within Bourgogne-Franche-Comté
- Coordinates: 47°47′28″N 4°32′38″E
- Country: France
- Region: Bourgogne-Franche-Comté
- Department: Côte-d'Or
- Arrondissement: Montbard
- Canton: Châtillon-sur-Seine
- Intercommunality: Pays Châtillonnais

Government
  - Mayor (2020–2026): François Riotte
- Area^{1}: 15.76 km^{2} (6.08 sq mi)
- Elevation: 243 m (797 ft)
- Highest elevation: 348 m (1,142 ft)
- Lowest elevation: 237 m (778 ft)
- Population (2023): 248
  - Density: 15.7/km^{2} (40.8/sq mi)
- Time zone: UTC+01:00 (CET)
  - Summer (DST): UTC+02:00 (CEST)
- INSEE/Postal code: 21134 /21400
- ^{1} French Land Register data, which excludes lakes, ponds, glaciers > 1 km^{2} (0.386 sq mi or 247 acres) and river estuaries.

Chamesson (French pronunciation: [ʃamɛsɔ̃]) is a commune in the Côte-d'Or department in eastern France.

== Population ==
Historical population
Year	Pop.	±% p.a.
1968	446	—
1975	341	−3.76%
1982	305	−1.58%
1990	331	+1.03%
1999	325	−0.20%
2007	292	−1.33%
2012	287	−0.34%
2017	268	−1.36%
2023	248	−1.28%
Source: INSEE

== See also ==
- Communes of the Côte-d'Or department
