= Coulmier-le-Sec =

- Commune
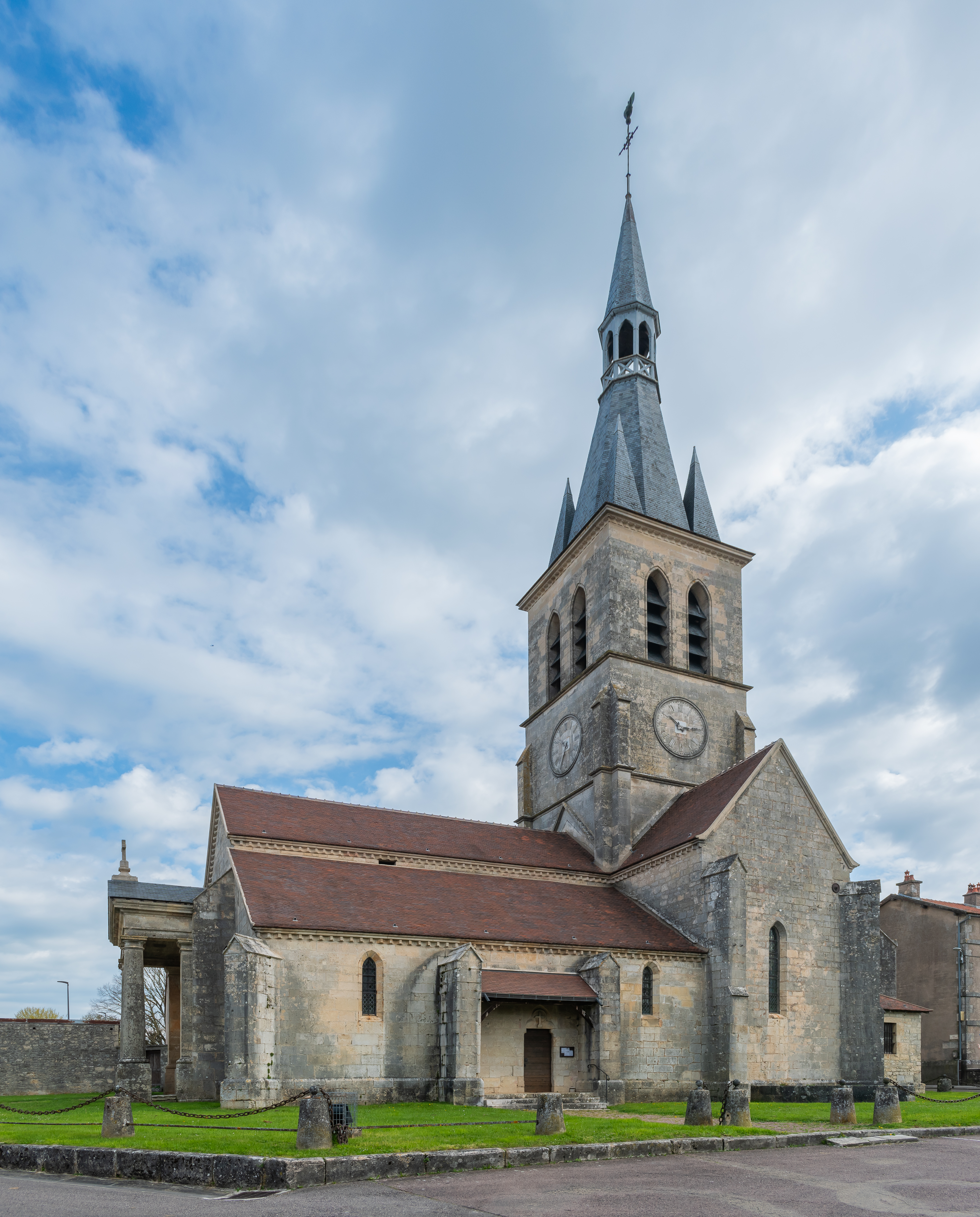
- The church in Coulmier-le-Sec

- Coat of arms
- Location of Coulmier-le-Sec
- Location within France Location within Bourgogne-Franche-Comté
- Coordinates: 47°45′03″N 4°29′37″E
- Country: France
- Region: Bourgogne-Franche-Comté
- Department: Côte-d'Or
- Arrondissement: Montbard
- Canton: Châtillon-sur-Seine
- Intercommunality: Pays Châtillonnais

Government
  - Mayor (2020–2026): Lydie Martin
- Area^{1}: 32.29 km^{2} (12.47 sq mi)
- Elevation: 334 m (1,096 ft)
- Highest elevation: 371 m (1,217 ft)
- Lowest elevation: 258 m (846 ft)
- Population (2023): 240
  - Density: 7.4/km^{2} (19/sq mi)
- Time zone: UTC+01:00 (CET)
  - Summer (DST): UTC+02:00 (CEST)
- INSEE/Postal code: 21201 /21400
- ^{1} French Land Register data, which excludes lakes, ponds, glaciers > 1 km^{2} (0.386 sq mi or 247 acres) and river estuaries.

Coulmier-le-Sec (French pronunciation: [kulmje lə sɛk]) is a commune in the Côte-d'Or department in eastern France.

== Population ==
Historical population
Year	Pop.	±% p.a.
1968	336	—
1975	307	−1.28%
1982	304	−0.14%
1990	286	−0.76%
1999	254	−1.31%
2007	273	+0.91%
2012	271	−0.15%
2017	260	−0.83%
2023	240	−1.33%
Source: INSEE

== See also ==
- Communes of the Côte-d'Or department
