= San Marcos Sucre =

- Municipality and town
- Interactive map of San Marcos Sucre
- Country: Colombia
- Department: Sucre Department
- Time zone: UTC-5 (Colombia Standard Time)

San Marcos is a town in Sucre department in Colombia. It is approximately 175 miles (282 km) north of Medellín, in the heart of Colombia's coffee-growing region.

San Marcos is located at 8°39′42.7″N 75°07′50.8″W. The symbol for its airport is SRS.
