= Bordes =

Bordes may refer to:

== Places ==
=== France ===
- Ampilly-les-Bordes, in the Côte-d'Or department
- Arricau-Bordes, in the Pyrénées-Atlantiques department
- Bordes, Hautes-Pyrénées, in the Hautes-Pyrénées department
- Bordes, Pyrénées-Atlantiques, in the Pyrénées-Atlantiques department
- Bordes-de-Rivière, in the Haute-Garonne department
- Jabreilles-les-Bordes, in the Haute-Vienne department
- La Celle-les-Bordes, in the Yvelines department
- Saint-Simon-de-Bordes, in the Charente-Maritime department
- Vier-Bordes, in the Hautes-Pyrénées department
- Villeneuve-les-Bordes, in the Seine-et-Marne department

=== Elsewhere ===
- Bordes d'Envalira, in Andorra
- Es Bòrdes, in Catalonia, Spain

== People with the surname ==
- Armonia Bordes (born 1945), French politician
- Bertrand des Bordes (died 1311), French cardinal and bishop
- Charles Bordes (1863-1909), French composer
- François Bordes (1919-1981), French geologist
- Juan Bordes (born 1948), Spanish sculptor
- Marguerite Broquedis Bordes (1893-1983), French tennis player
- Marie-Léontine Bordes-Pène (1858-1924), French pianist
- Pamella Bordes (born 1961), Indian photographer

== See also ==
- Bordes scene, a Dutch political ceremony
- La Borde
- Laborde
- Les Bordes (disambiguation)
