= Les Bordes =

Les Bordes is the name or part of the name of the following communes in France:

- Ampilly-les-Bordes, in the Côte-d'Or department
- Jabreilles-les-Bordes, in the Haute-Vienne department
- La Celle-les-Bordes, in the Yvelines department
- Les Bordes, Indre, in the Indre department
- Les Bordes, Loiret, in the Loiret department, site of renowned golf course
- Les Bordes, Saône-et-Loire, in the Saône-et-Loire department
- Les Bordes, Yonne, in the Yonne department
- Les Bordes-Aumont, in the Aube department
- Les Bordes-sur-Arize, in the Ariège department
- Les Bordes-sur-Lez, in the Ariège department
- Villeneuve-les-Bordes, in the Seine-et-Marne department

== See also ==
- Bordes (disambiguation)
