= Baigneux-les-Juifs =

- Commune
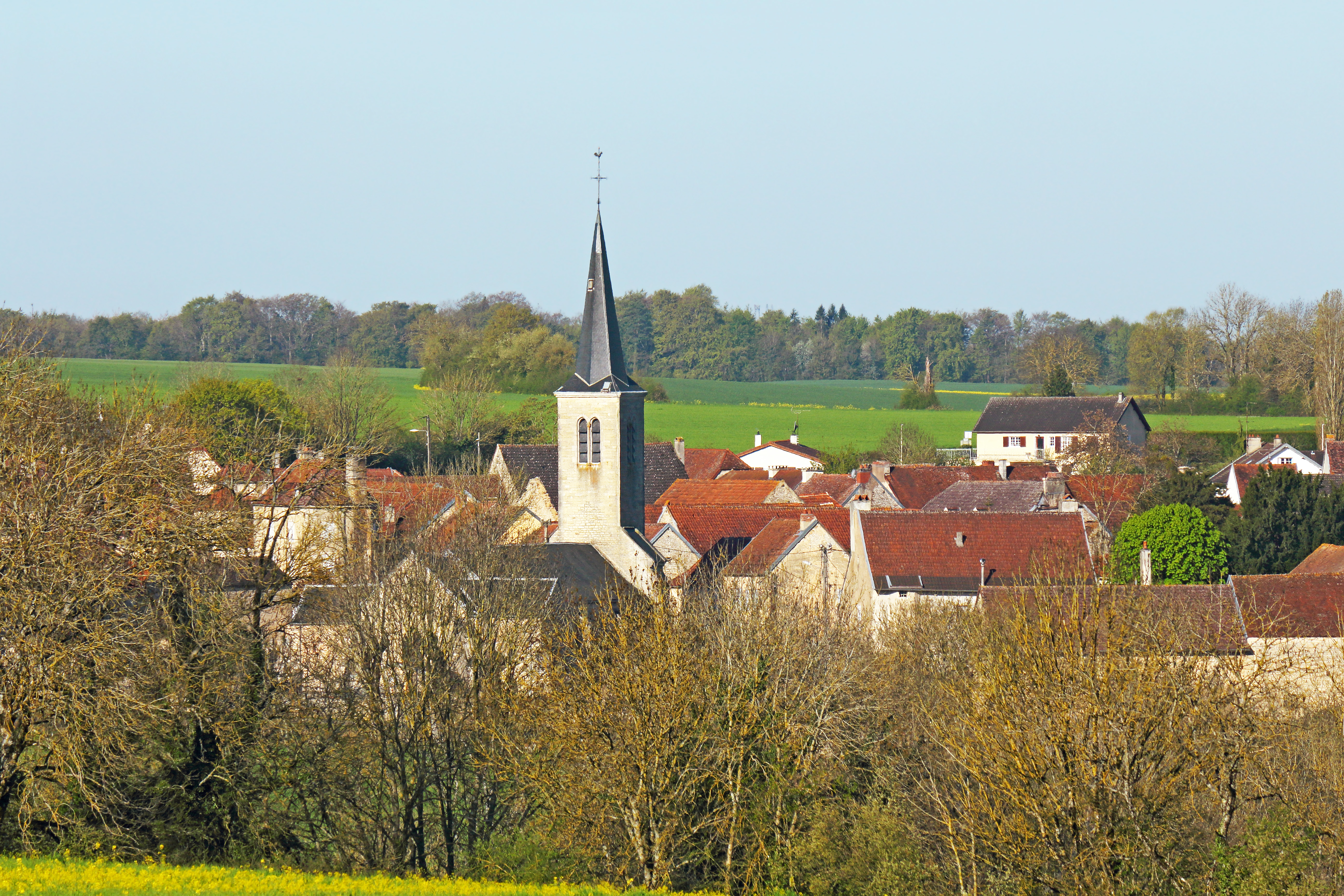
- A general view of Baigneux-les-Juifs

- Coat of arms
- Location of Baigneux-les-Juifs
- Location within France Location within Bourgogne-Franche-Comté
- Coordinates: 47°36′03″N 4°39′00″E
- Country: France
- Region: Bourgogne-Franche-Comté
- Department: Côte-d'Or
- Arrondissement: Montbard
- Canton: Châtillon-sur-Seine
- Intercommunality: Pays Châtillonnais

Government
  - Mayor (2020–2026): Didier Robin
- Area^{1}: 12.47 km^{2} (4.81 sq mi)
- Elevation: 404 m (1,325 ft)
- Highest elevation: 441 m (1,447 ft)
- Lowest elevation: 325 m (1,066 ft)
- Population (2023): 198
  - Density: 15.9/km^{2} (41.1/sq mi)
- Time zone: UTC+01:00 (CET)
  - Summer (DST): UTC+02:00 (CEST)
- INSEE/Postal code: 21043 /21450
- ^{1} French Land Register data, which excludes lakes, ponds, glaciers > 1 km^{2} (0.386 sq mi or 247 acres) and river estuaries.

Baigneux-les-Juifs (French pronunciation: [bɛɲø le ʒɥif]) is a commune in the Côte-d'Or department in the Bourgogne-Franche-Comté region of Central-Eastern France.

== Geography ==
Baigneux-les-Juifs is located some 25 km east by south-east of Montbard and 10 km south-west of Aignay-le-Duc. Access to the commune is by the D 971 road from Saint-Marc-sur-Seine in the north which passes through the commune east of the village and continues south to Chanceaux. The D 21 branches off the D 971 in the commune and goes north-east, passing through the village, and continuing to Jours-lès-Baigneux. The D 954 goes west from the village to Étormay. The D 114^{A} branches off the D 971 at the D 21 intersection and goes east to Orret. The commune is entirely farmland.

=== Climate ===
Baigneux-les-Juifs has an oceanic climate (Köppen climate classification Cfb). The average annual temperature in Baigneux-les-Juifs is 10.2 °C (50.4 °F). The average annual rainfall is 978.6 mm (38.53 in) with May as the wettest month. The temperatures are highest on average in July, at around 18.7 °C (65.7 °F), and lowest in January, at around 2.4 °C (36.3 °F). The highest temperature ever recorded in Baigneux-les-Juifs was 40.3 °C (104.5 °F) on 9 August 2003; the coldest temperature ever recorded was −24.9 °C (−12.8 °F) on 16 January 1985.

Climate data for Baigneux-les-Juifs (1981–2010 averages, extremes 1961−2008)
Month	Jan	Feb	Mar	Apr	May	Jun	Jul	Aug	Sep	Oct	Nov	Dec	Year
Record high °C (°F)	19.0 (66.2)	20.0 (68.0)	24.0 (75.2)	28.5 (83.3)	31.0 (87.8)	35.7 (96.3)	40.0 (104.0)	40.3 (104.5)	34.0 (93.2)	28.5 (83.3)	20.1 (68.2)	18.0 (64.4)	40.3 (104.5)
Mean daily maximum °C (°F)	5.4 (41.7)	6.7 (44.1)	10.6 (51.1)	14.1 (57.4)	18.5 (65.3)	22.0 (71.6)	25.0 (77.0)	24.7 (76.5)	20.3 (68.5)	15.4 (59.7)	9.2 (48.6)	6.0 (42.8)	14.9 (58.8)
Daily mean °C (°F)	2.4 (36.3)	3.0 (37.4)	6.2 (43.2)	8.8 (47.8)	13.0 (55.4)	16.2 (61.2)	18.7 (65.7)	18.5 (65.3)	15.0 (59.0)	11.3 (52.3)	5.8 (42.4)	3.2 (37.8)	10.2 (50.4)
Mean daily minimum °C (°F)	−0.6 (30.9)	−0.7 (30.7)	1.8 (35.2)	3.5 (38.3)	7.4 (45.3)	10.4 (50.7)	12.4 (54.3)	12.4 (54.3)	9.7 (49.5)	7.2 (45.0)	2.5 (36.5)	0.4 (32.7)	5.6 (42.1)
Record low °C (°F)	−24.9 (−12.8)	−19.0 (−2.2)	−18.0 (−0.4)	−7.9 (17.8)	−3.6 (25.5)	−1.0 (30.2)	1.0 (33.8)	0.0 (32.0)	−2.5 (27.5)	−6.5 (20.3)	−12.1 (10.2)	−18.0 (−0.4)	−24.9 (−12.8)
Average precipitation mm (inches)	83.1 (3.27)	74.8 (2.94)	70.2 (2.76)	74.3 (2.93)	92.3 (3.63)	81.8 (3.22)	80.3 (3.16)	70.7 (2.78)	83.5 (3.29)	92.1 (3.63)	86.0 (3.39)	89.5 (3.52)	978.6 (38.53)
Average precipitation days (≥ 1.0 mm)	13.4	11.5	12.0	11.0	12.4	10.3	9.5	9.5	9.9	12.4	13.0	13.8	138.6
Source: Meteociel

== History ==
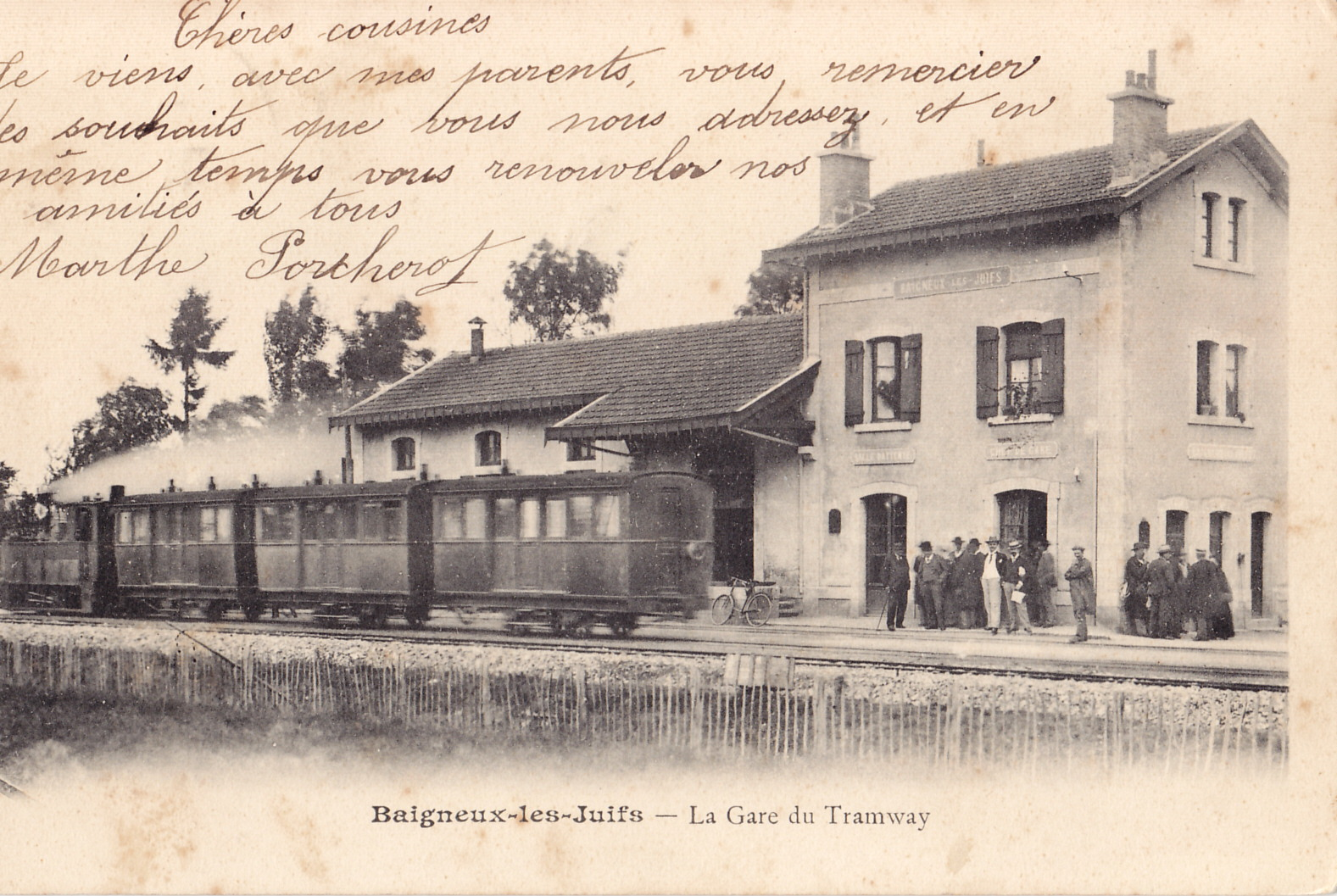
The Railway Station before 1904

In the Middle Ages the village was called Bagnos, probably from the Latin Balneolum meaning "small bath". This name was completed after a Jewish community was allowed to settle there in the 13th century. This community was permanently driven out by the Dukes of Burgundy in the 15th century.

From 1895 to 1933 the commune had a narrow gauge railway operated by the Chemins de fer départementaux de la Côte-d'Or (Departmental Railway of Côte-d'Or) (CDCO) which connected the village to Châtillon-sur-Seine.

=== Heraldry ===
Arms of Baigneux-les-Juifs	Blazon: Azure, three bends of Or each charged with a double chain of rings entwined of Sable.

== Administration ==
List of Successive Mayors

From	To	Name	Party	Position
	1656	Anthoine Chamereau		
1789		Louis Beguin		
2001	2014	Bernard Malègue		
2014	2020	Michèle Bargeot		Retired teacher
2020	2026	Didier Robin		

== Demography ==
The inhabitants of the commune are known as Bagnosiens in French.

Historical population

Year	Pop.	±% p.a.
1793	512	—
1821	461	−0.37%
1846	448	−0.11%
1872	436	−0.10%
1901	420	−0.13%
1926	347	−0.76%
1946	378	+0.43%
1962	347	−0.53%
1968	452	+4.50%

Year	Pop.	±% p.a.
1975	300	−5.69%
1982	261	−1.97%
1990	251	−0.49%
1999	271	+0.86%
2007	260	−0.52%
2012	259	−0.08%
2017	242	−1.35%
2023	198	−3.29%

Source: EHESS and INSEE

== Culture and heritage ==
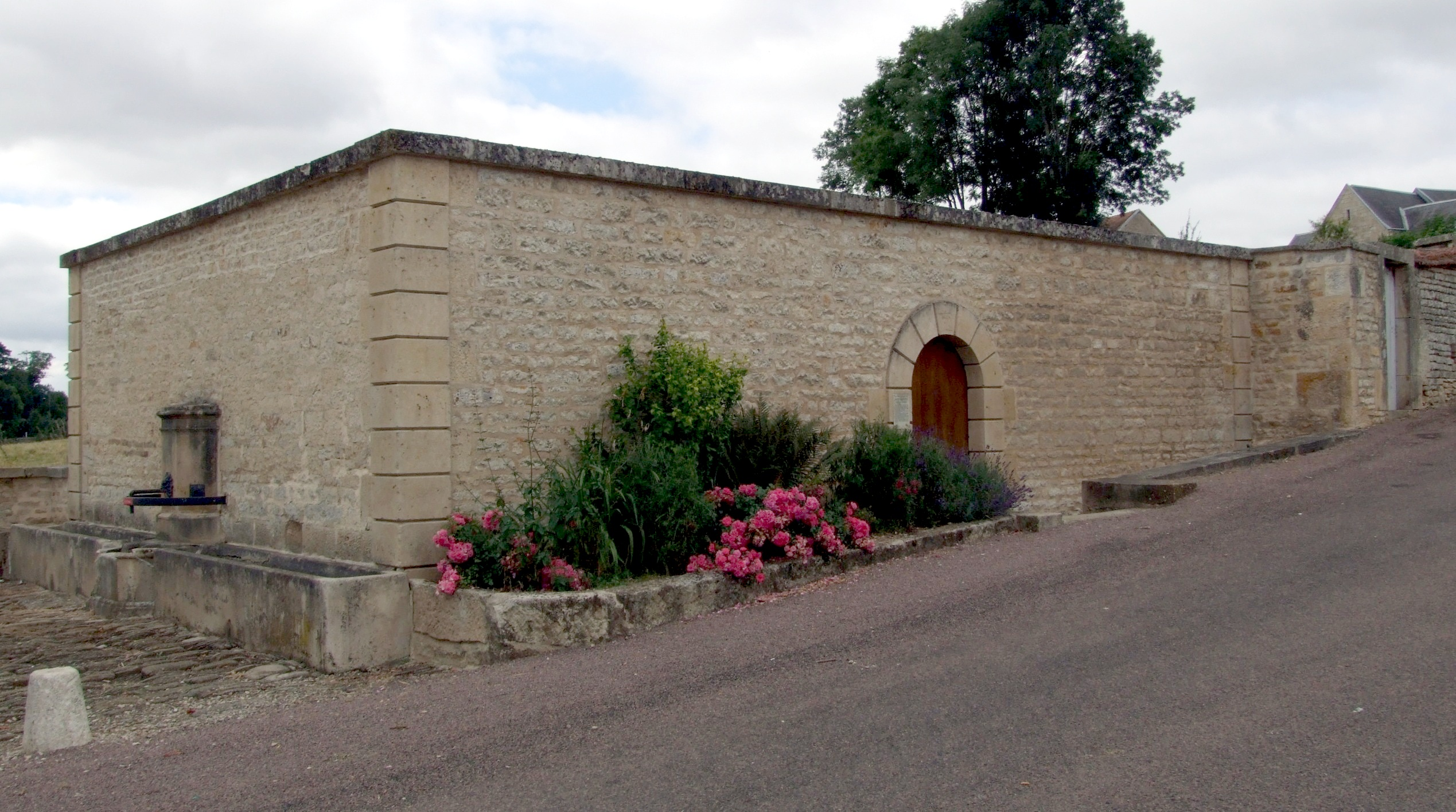
Lavoir exterior

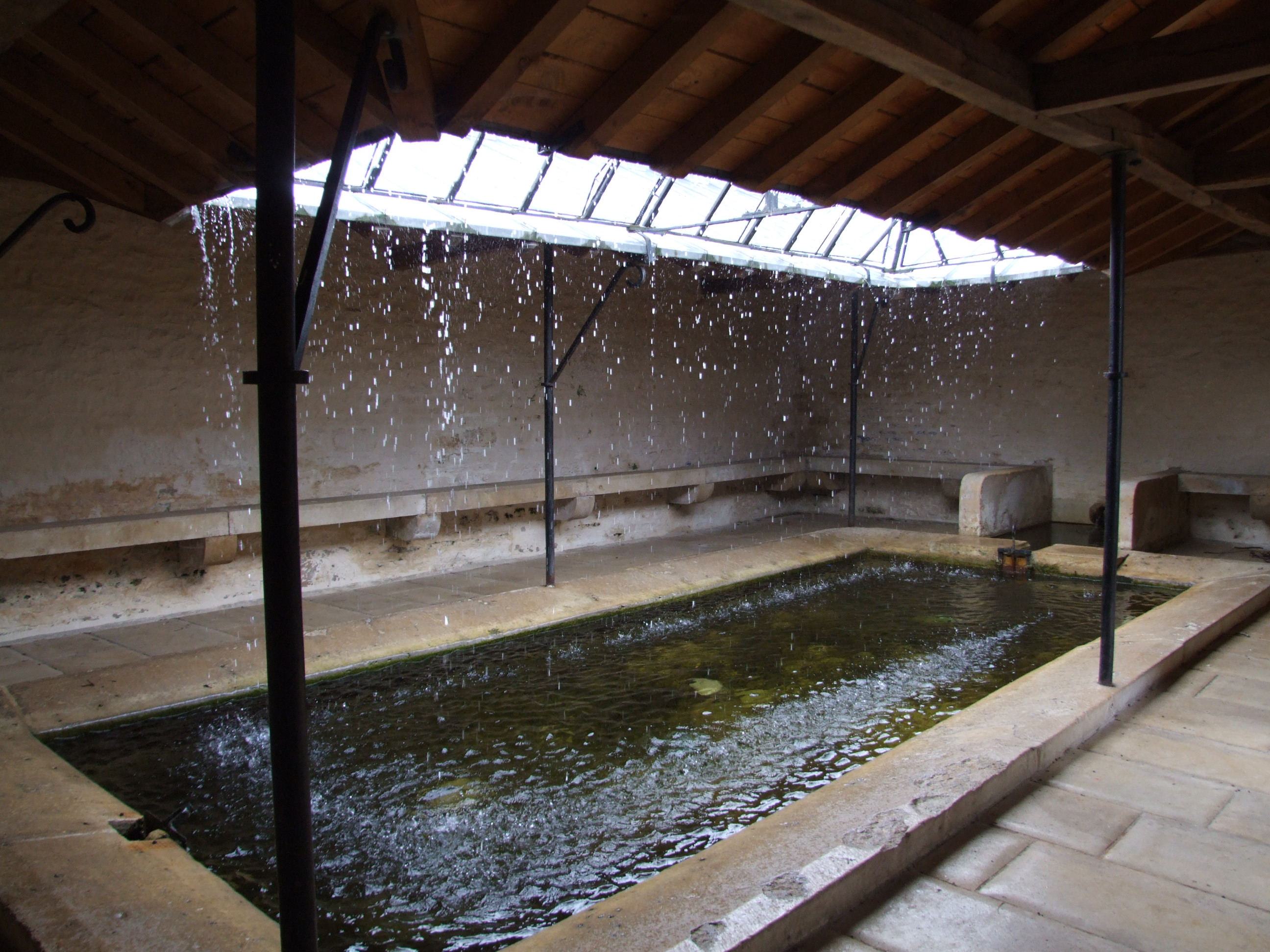
Lavoir interior

=== Civil heritage ===
The commune has many buildings and sites that are registered as historical monuments:

- Houses (16th-18th century). One of the houses contains a Statue of Christ bound (1760) which is registered as an historical object.
- The Hôtel de la Croix de Fer (Hotel of the Iron Cross) at RN454 (16th century)
- A Lavoir (Public laundry) (1869)
- The Town Hall/School (19th century)

=== Religious heritage ===
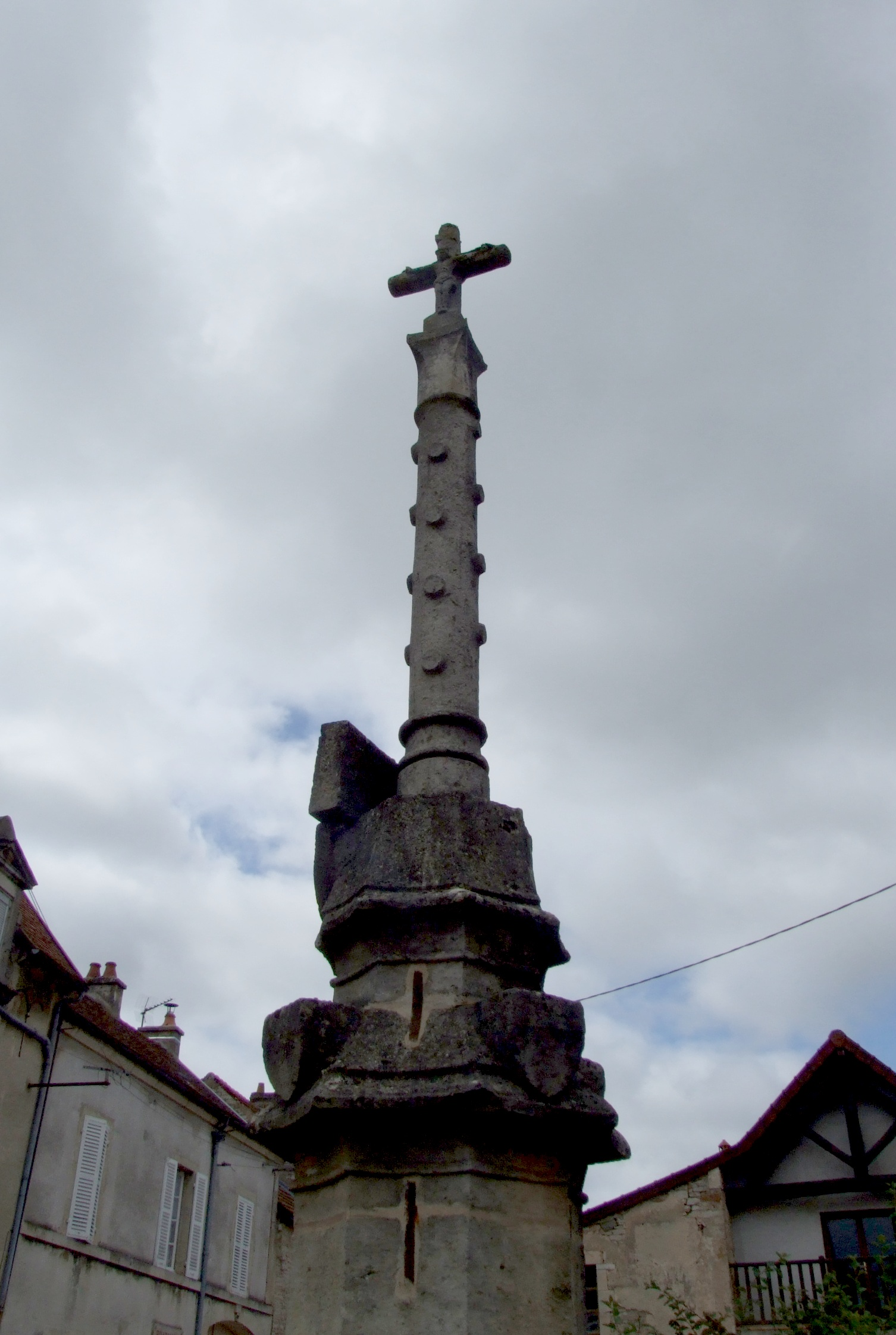
The 15th century Monumental Cross

The commune has many religious buildings and sites that are registered as historical monuments:

- Wayside Crosses
- Monumental Crosses (15th century)
- A Cemetery Cross (16th century)
- The Sainte-Anne Oratory south of the village (1810). The Oratory contains a Group Sculpture of the Education of the Virgin (16th century) which is registered as an historical object.
- The Ermitage de Val de Seine (1633). The Ermitrage (Retreat) contains many items that are registered as historical objects:
  - The Tombstone of Jehan le Grant (1478)
  - A Cross (18th century)
  - A Statue: Saint Joseph and the child Jesus (17th century)
  - A Statue: Saint-Madeleine (17th century) (Stolen in 1979)
  - A Statue: Saint-Sebastien (17th century) (Stolen in 1979)
  - A Statue: Saint-Laurent (16th century) (Stolen in 1979)
  - A Statuette: Saint-Antoine the Hermit (15th century) (Stolen in 1979)
  - A Statue: Christ bound (16th century) (Stolen in 1979)
  - A recessed Placard (19th century)
  - A Stoup (17th century)
  - An Altar painting: the Annunciation (17th century)
  - An Altar, Retable, and Tabernacle (17th century)
- A Presbytery (18th century)
- The Parish Church of Sainte-Madeleine (13th century) The Church contains a large number of items that are registered as historical objects.

== Notable people linked to the commune ==
- Louis Beguin (1747-1831), Mayor of Baigneux-les-Juifs then administrator and MP for Côte-d'Or

== See also ==
- Communes of the Côte-d'Or department
