= Claude Hudelot =

French sinologist (1942–2021)

- Born: 20 July 1942; Chanceaux, France
- Died: 15 August 2021 (aged 79); Bali, Indonesia
- Occupation: Sinologist

Claude Hudelot (20 July 1942 – 15 August 2021) was a French sinologist, historian, radio show producer, and director of documentaries. He directed multiple cultural establishments within France and was a cultural attaché in China for eight years.

== Biography ==
Claude was born on 20 July 1942 in Chanceaux to Roger and Suzanne Hudelot, both of whom were teachers. He lived in Burgundy from 1942 to 1951, French Algeria from 1951 to 1956, and the French Riviera from 1956 to 1961. He spent his secondary studies in Bombay in 1961 and 1962. Upon his return to France, he earned a degree in English and visited China for the first time. He took courses in Chinese at the Institut national des langues et civilisations orientales, earning his degree in 1967 and obtaining a master's degree in contemporary Chinese history in 1969.

In 1975, Hudelot became a producer for France Culture. He produced numerous radio shows, such as "Après-midi de France Culture", "Nuits magnétiques", "L’heure du laitier", and "Poètes : vos papiers". In 1981, he participated in "Trottoirs de Buenos-Aires" and produced "Désirs des arts" from 1982 to 1983, which was also broadcast on Antenne 2.

In 1984, Hudelot became director of the House of Culture of La Rochelle. There, he developed projects on themes of contemporary dance, plastic arts, photography, and the audiovisual. He was also a partner of the La Rochelle International Film Festival, directed by Jean-Loup Passek. In 1985, he published the La Longue Marche vers la Chine moderne collection with Éditions Gallimard. In 1987, he participated in the 13th National Congress of the Chinese Communist Party and broadcast the event for French audiences on Antenne 2.

At the end of 1987, Hudelot was appointed director of the Rencontres d'Arles. The 1988 program was titled "La danse, la Chine, la pub", and the following year it focused on the last 20 years of the Rencontres (1969–1989). In 1989, he left the festival.

In 1990, Hudelot returned to France Culture as a producer, conducting the final radio interview of John Cage. He then co-directed the program La Planète Alberk Kahn for France 3. In 1994, he was appointed cultural attaché at the Embassy of France in Beijing. In 1994, he was appointed director of the Institut Franco-Japonais du Kansa, where he organized exhibitions and events in Kyoto and Kansai, such as the works of the photographer Lucien Clergue. In 1995, he organized the Kyoto International Film Festival, which displayed over 100 films and paid tribute to Auguste and Louis Lumière, Jean Renoir, Ken Loach, and Nagisa Ōshima. The event was supported by the Cinémathèque Française. He also co-founded the Académie de musique française de Kyoto.

Hudelot returned to France in 1998 and produced multiple radio shows based on his experiences in China and Japan. He once again returned to France Culture in 2000 and produced Le Bon Plaisir de Zao Wouki à Shanghaï. In 2002, he co-released "Hou Bo, Xu Xiaobing, photographes de Mao" alongside Jean-Michel Vecchiet. In 2002, he was again sent to be a cultural attaché in China, this time at the French consulate in Shanghai, a position he held until 2007.

In 2009, Hudelot published a retrospective work titled Le Mao alongside photographer Guy Gallice and Éditions du Rouergue. The final chapter was dedicated to the image of Mao Zedong in contemporary art. In 2009, he was a guest on Radio France Internationale for the series "La saga Mao". He then opened various blogs on Rue89, Mediapart, and Le Monde.fr.

Claude Hudelot died in Bali on 15 August 2021 at the age of 79.

== Publications ==
- La Longue Marche (1971)
- Le monde autour de 1949 (1973)
- Jeanclos, le tympan de Saint-Ayoul (1986)
- Kaltex en Chine (1987)
- Mon royaume pour un cheval (1988)
- La Longue marche vers la Chine moderne (1985)
- Mao (2001)
- L’album de la famille Chine (2001)
- Yan Pei-Ming, Fils du Dragon (2003)
- Georges Joussaume (2009)
- Le Mao (2009)
- Mao (2011)
