= Ampilly-les-Bordes =

- Commune
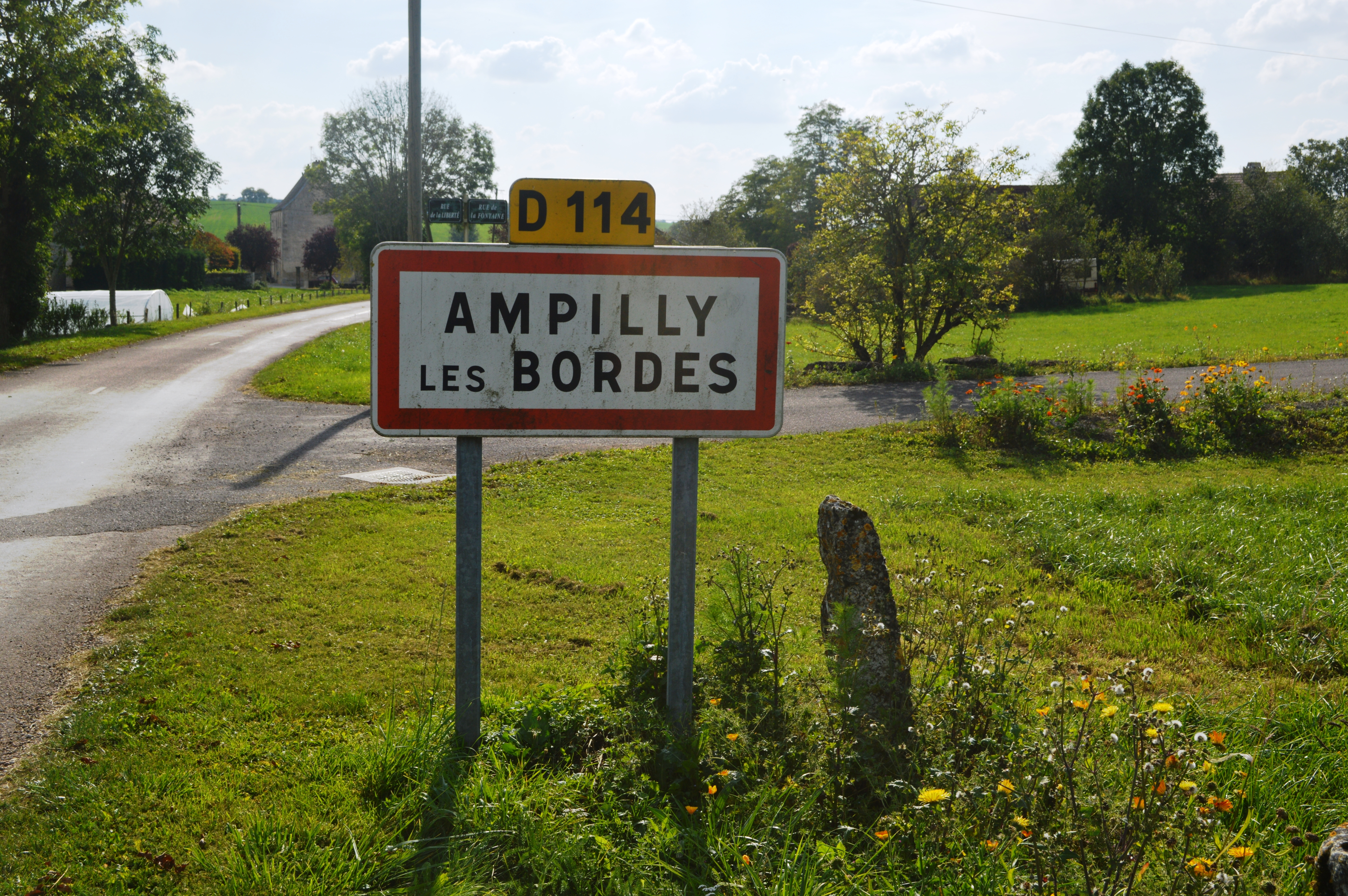
- The road into Ampilly-les-Bordes
- Location of Ampilly-les-Bordes
- Location within France Location within Bourgogne-Franche-Comté
- Coordinates: 47°38′01″N 4°37′47″E
- Country: France
- Region: Bourgogne-Franche-Comté
- Department: Côte-d'Or
- Arrondissement: Montbard
- Canton: Châtillon-sur-Seine
- Intercommunality: Pays Châtillonnais

Government
  - Mayor (2020–2026): Luc Babouillard
- Area^{1}: 14.48 km^{2} (5.59 sq mi)
- Elevation: 400 m (1,300 ft)
- Highest elevation: 421 m (1,381 ft)
- Lowest elevation: 350 m (1,150 ft)
- Population (2023): 79
  - Density: 5.5/km^{2} (14/sq mi)
- Time zone: UTC+01:00 (CET)
  - Summer (DST): UTC+02:00 (CEST)
- INSEE/Postal code: 21011 /21450
- ^{1} French Land Register data, which excludes lakes, ponds, glaciers > 1 km^{2} (0.386 sq mi or 247 acres) and river estuaries.

Ampilly-les-Bordes (French pronunciation: [ɑ̃piji le bɔʁd]) is a commune in the Côte-d'Or department in the Bourgogne-Franche-Comté region of eastern France.

== Geography ==
Ampilly-les-Bordes is located some 40 km south by south-east of Chatillon-sur-Seine and 25 km east of Montbard. It can be accessed by highway D971 from Saint-Marc-sur-Seine in the north passing through the commune east of the village and continuing south to Chanceaux. The village can be accessed by road D114 running west from the D971 through the village and continuing west to Etormay. The D114P runs east from the D971 to Quemignerot. The D954 runs from Baigneux-les-Juifs in the south through the southern part of the commune to Quemignerot. Apart from the village there is the hamlet of Ampilly-le-Haut at the intersection of the D971 and D114. The commune consists entirely of farmland except for a few patches of forest.

A small stream rises in the south of the commune and flows south.

== Administration ==
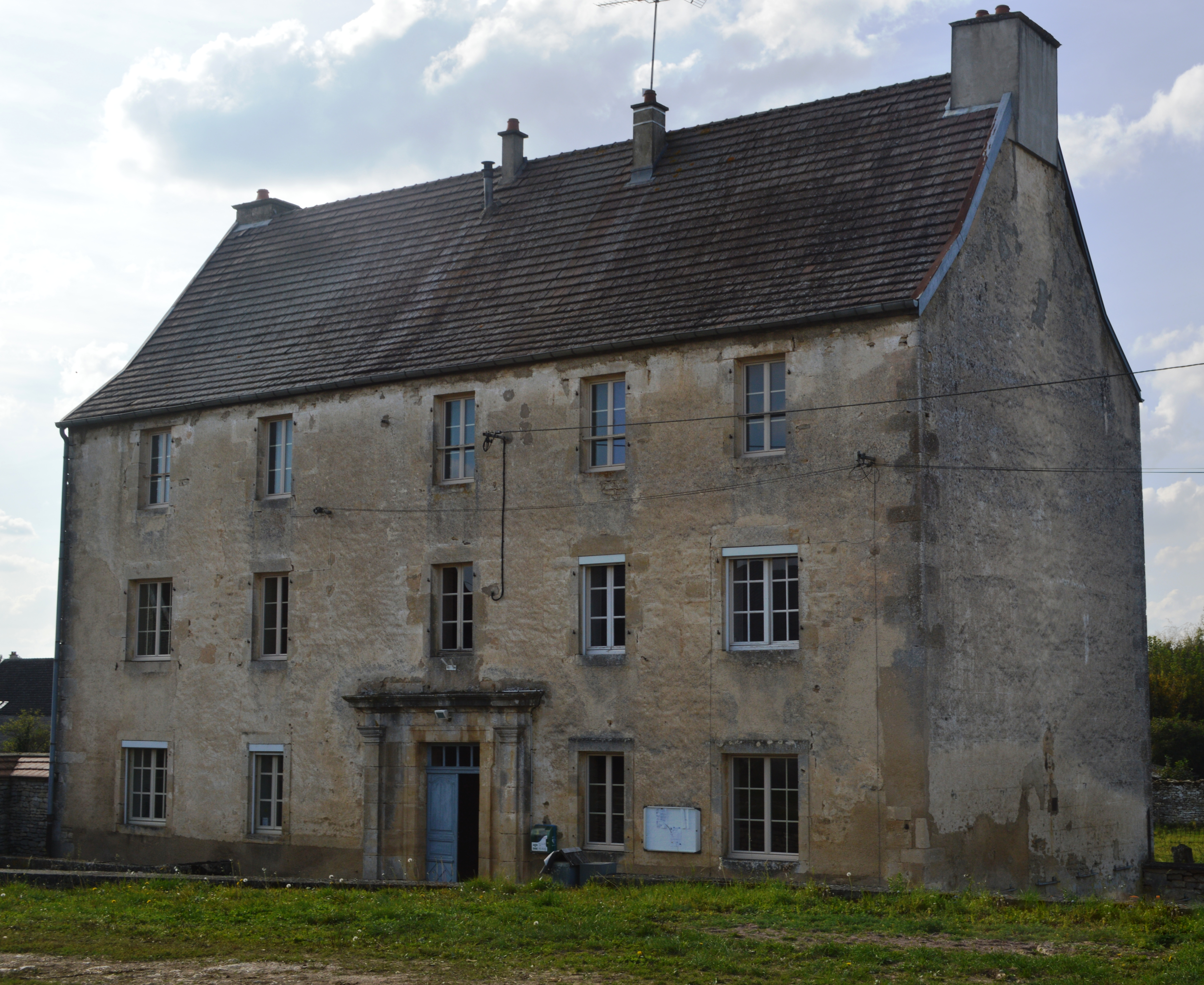
The Town Hall

List of Successive Mayors

From	To	Name
2001	2008	Odette Parent
2008	2026	Luc Babouillard

== Demography ==
The inhabitants of the commune are known as Ampilliens or Ampilliennes in French.

Historical population

Year	Pop.	±% p.a.
1793	208	—
1821	226	+0.30%
1846	240	+0.24%
1872	211	−0.49%
1901	165	−0.84%
1926	147	−0.46%
1946	155	+0.27%
1962	152	−0.12%
1968	126	−3.08%

Year	Pop.	±% p.a.
1975	115	−1.30%
1982	117	+0.25%
1990	100	−1.94%
1999	90	−1.16%
2007	67	−3.62%
2012	78	+3.09%
2017	84	+1.49%
2023	79	−1.02%

Source: EHESS and INSEE

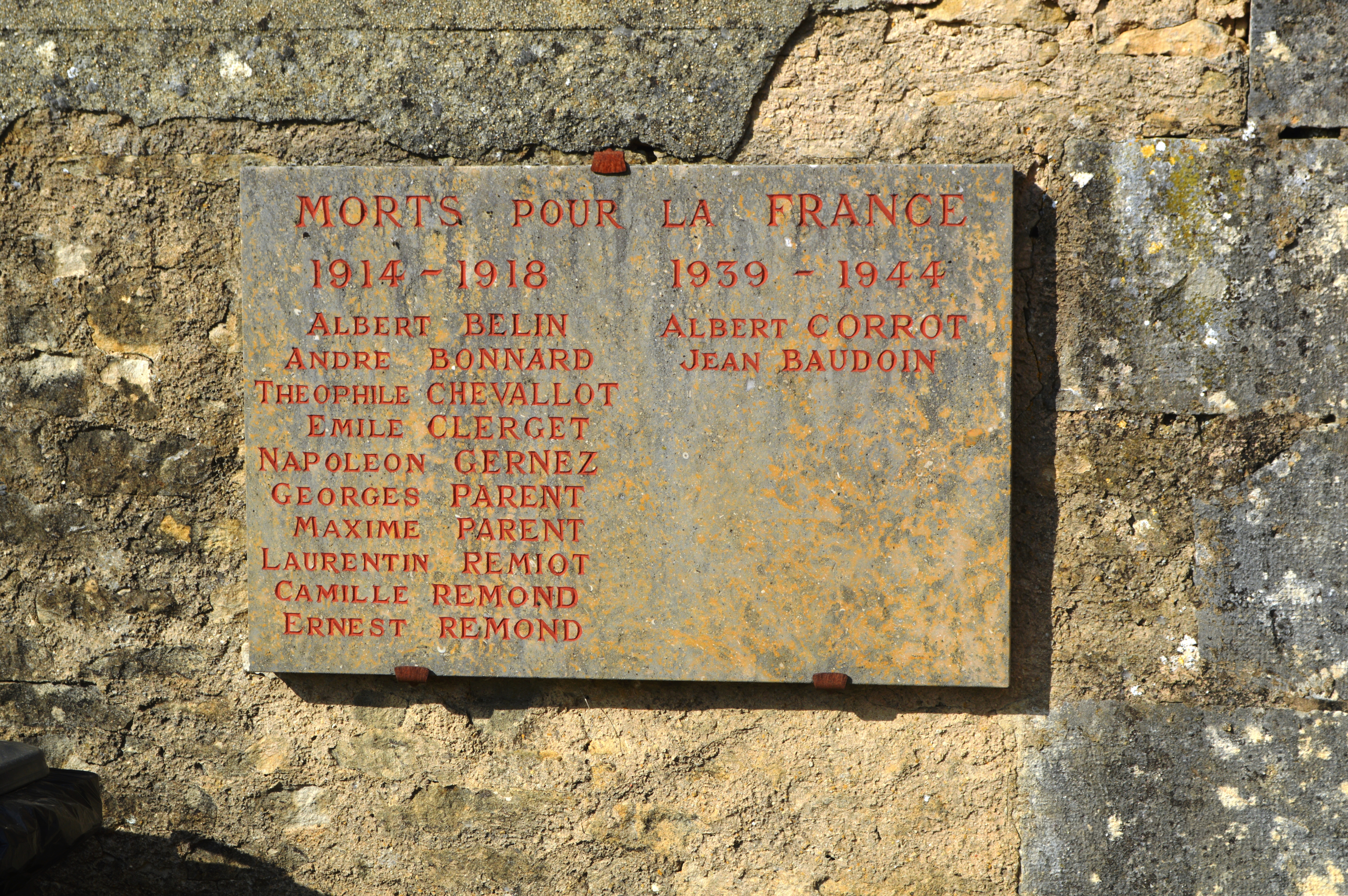
Ampilly-les-Bordes War Memorial

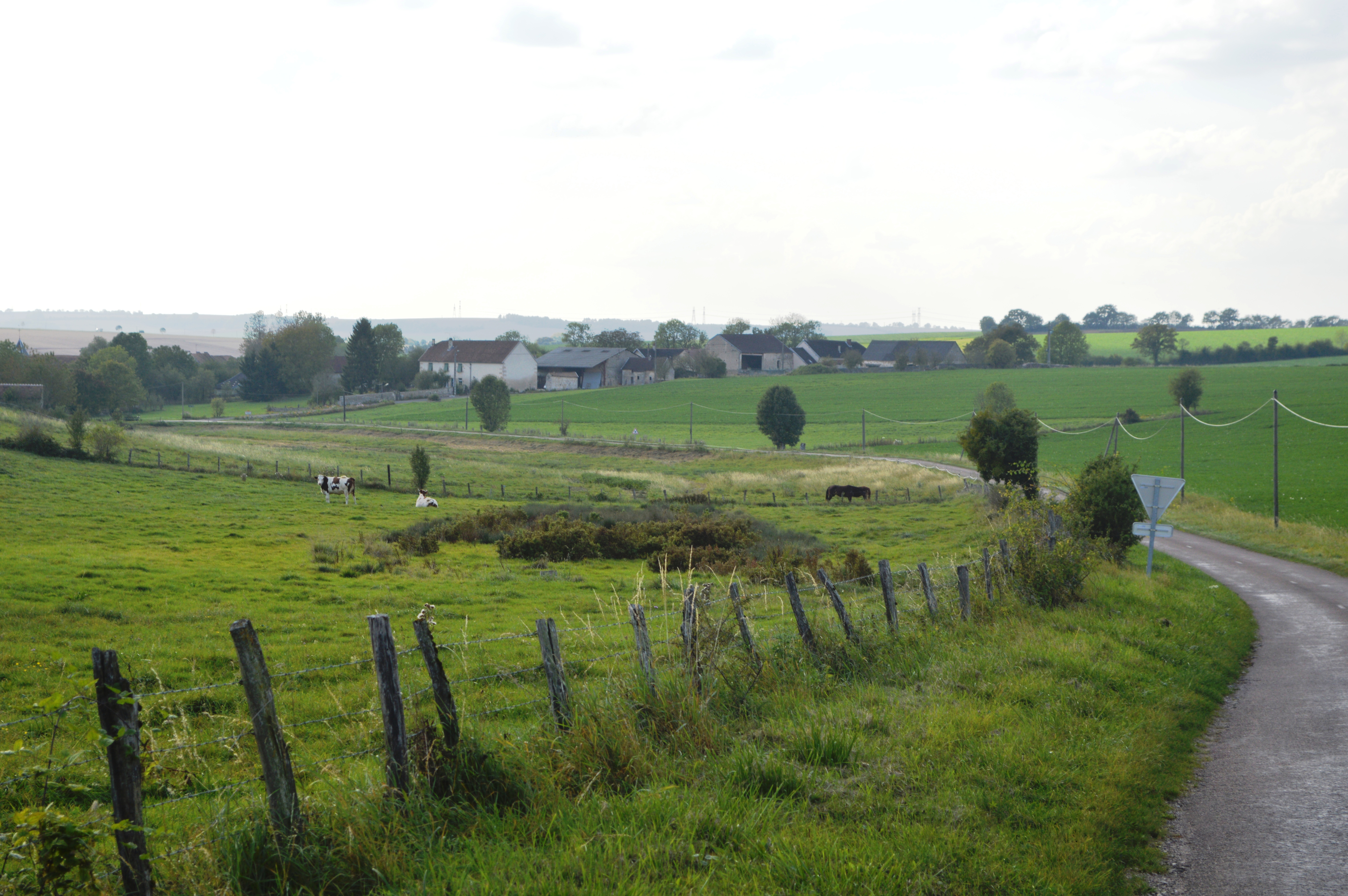
Ampilly-les-Bordes Landscape

== Culture and heritage ==
=== Civil heritage ===
The commune has a number of buildings and structures that are registered as historical monuments:

- A Lavoir (Public laundry) at CR 9 (19th century)
- A Farmhouse at Rue de la Fontaine (17th century)
- A Coaching Inn at RN 71 (19th century)
- A Lavoir (Public laundry) at Meursauge (19th century)
- A Semi-detached House at La Folie (19th century)
- A Farmhouse at Ampilly-le-Haut (19th century)
- A Lavoir (Public laundry) at Ampilly-le-Haut (19th century)
- A Farmhouse (1835)
- The Town Hall (18th century)
- Houses and Farms (17th-19th century)

=== Religious heritage ===
The commune has several religious buildings and sites that are registered as historical monuments:

- A Wayside Cross at CVO 3 (1680)
- A Wayside Cross at Meursauge (1872)
- The Chapel of Saint-Honoré at Meursauge (15th century). The Chapel contains three items that are registered as historical objects:
  - 2 Altar Candlesticks (19th century)
  - An Altar Cross (19th century)
  - A Statue: Saint John the Baptist (15th century)
- A Wayside Cross at La Folie (1821)
- A Monumental Cross at Ampilly-le-Haut (1875)
- A Monumental Cross (1873)
- A Cemetery Cross (18th century)
- The Tomb of Michel Armand Polycarpe Jacquet (1847)
- The Parish Church of the Assumption (14th century). The church contains many items that are registered as historical objects:
  - The Furniture in the Church
  - A Pail for holy water (18th century)
  - A Processional Staff (19th century)
  - 2 Reliquaries (18th century)
  - A Ciborium (1798)
  - A Chalice (1789)
  - A Cabinet (19th century)
  - A Bas-relief: God the Father (18th century)
  - 2 Statues: Saint Christine and Saint Honoré (18th century)
  - A Cross: Christ on the Cross (17th century)
  - A Canopy (18th century)
  - A Confessional (19th century)
  - A Pulpit (19th century)
  - 2 Statuettes: Angels (18th century)
  - An Altar and Tabernacle (18th century)

=== Gallery of Historical Monuments ===
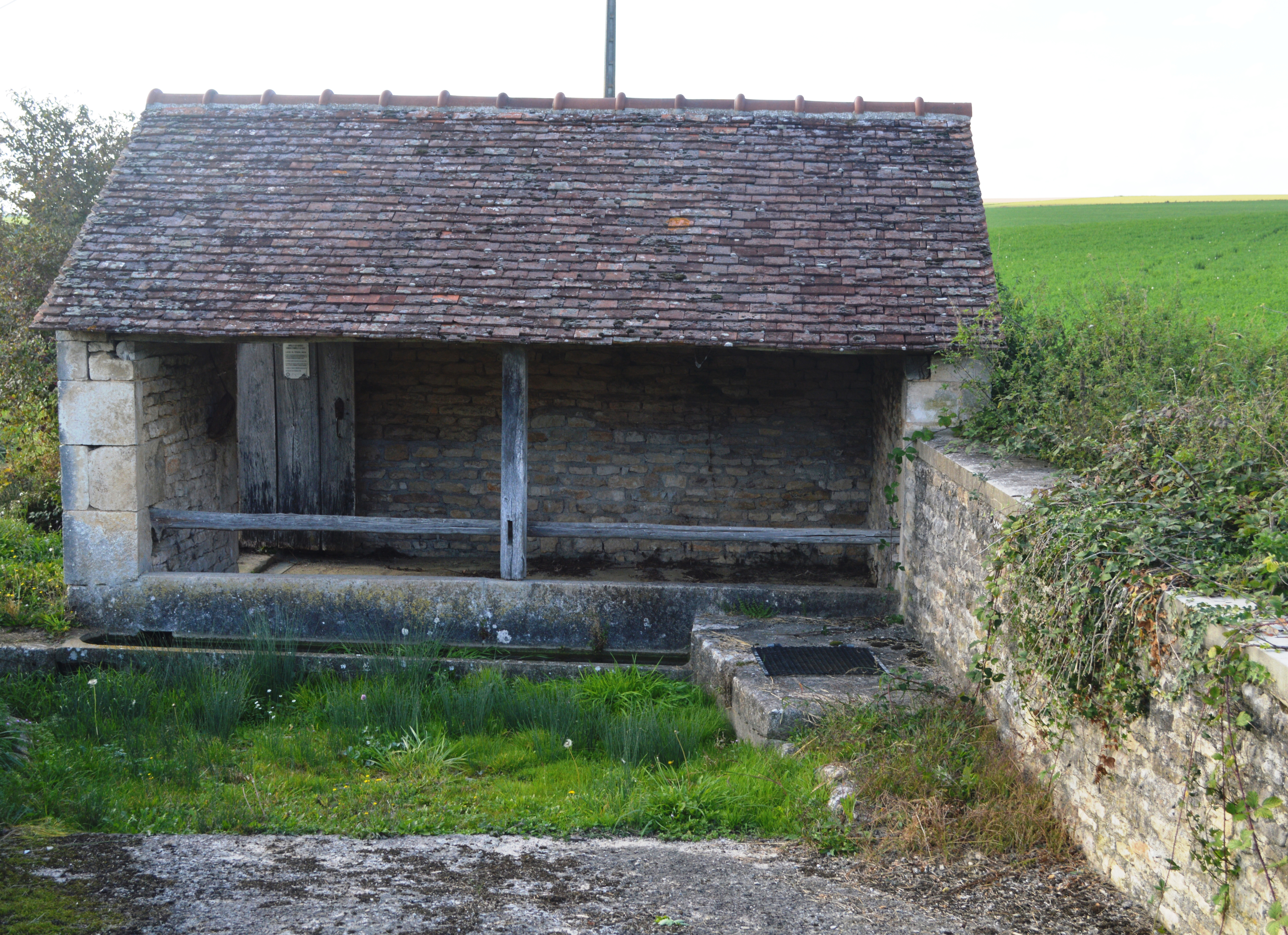
The Lavoir (Public laundry) at CR 9

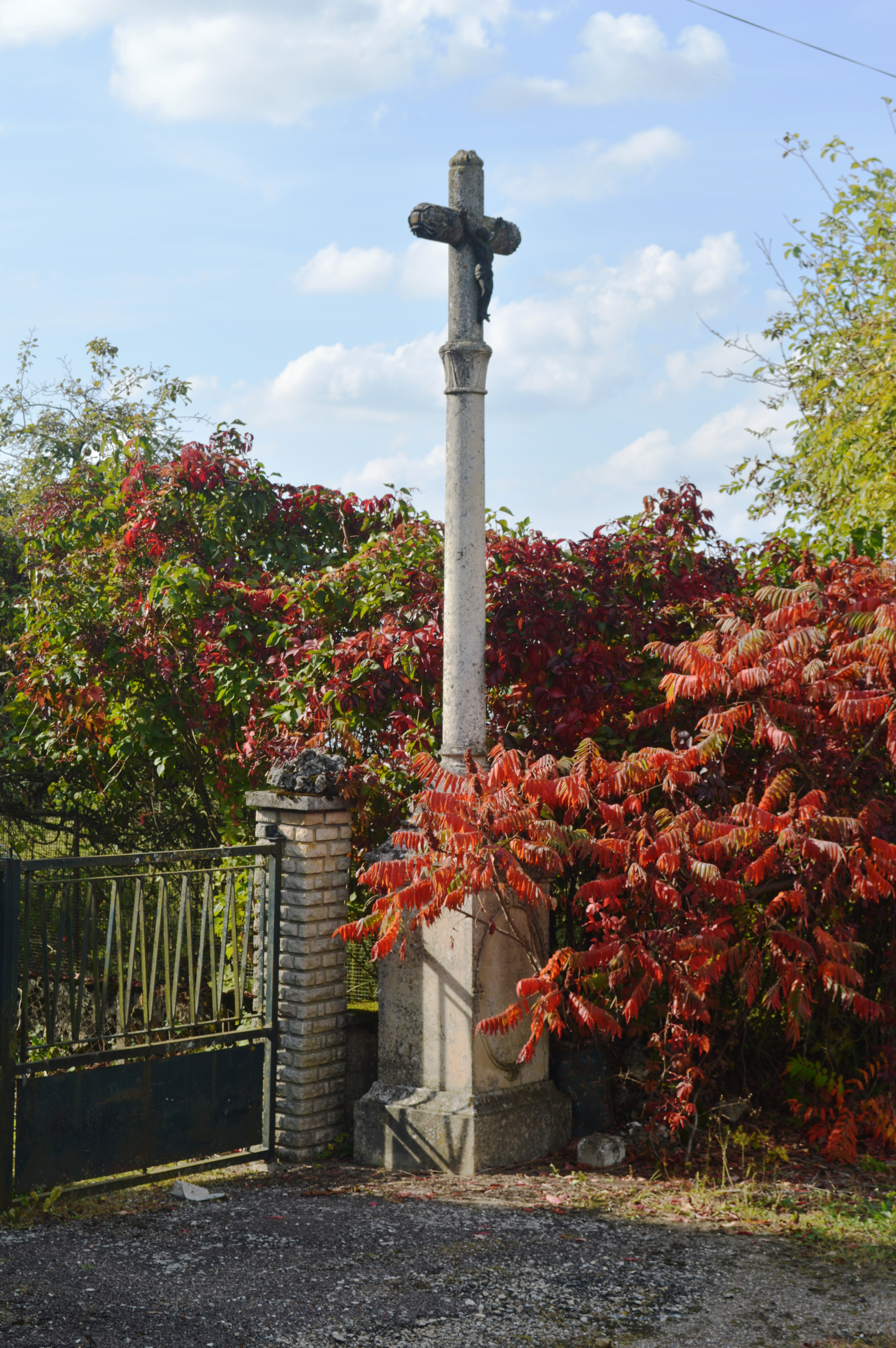
A Wayside Cross

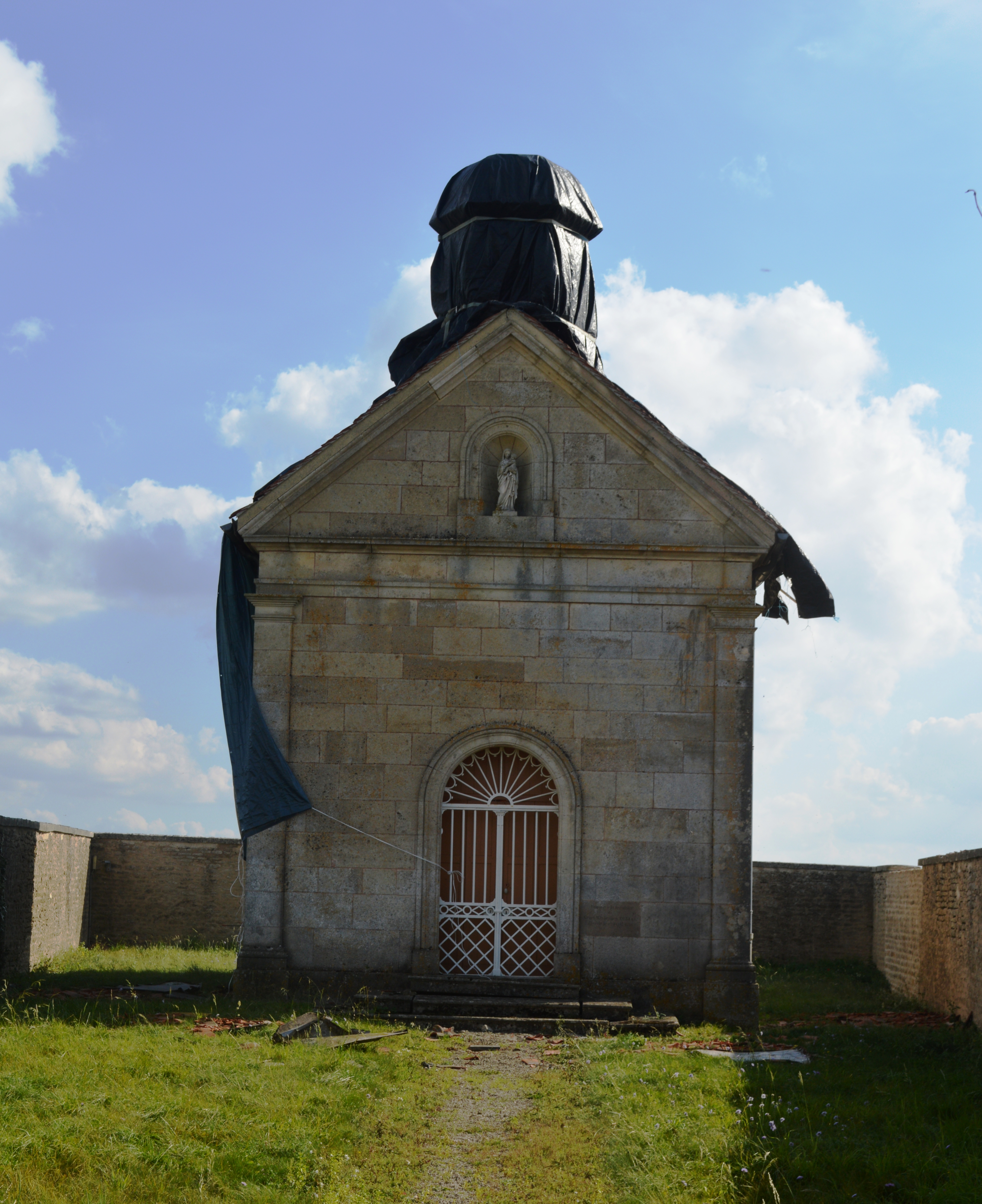
The Chapel of Saint-Honoré

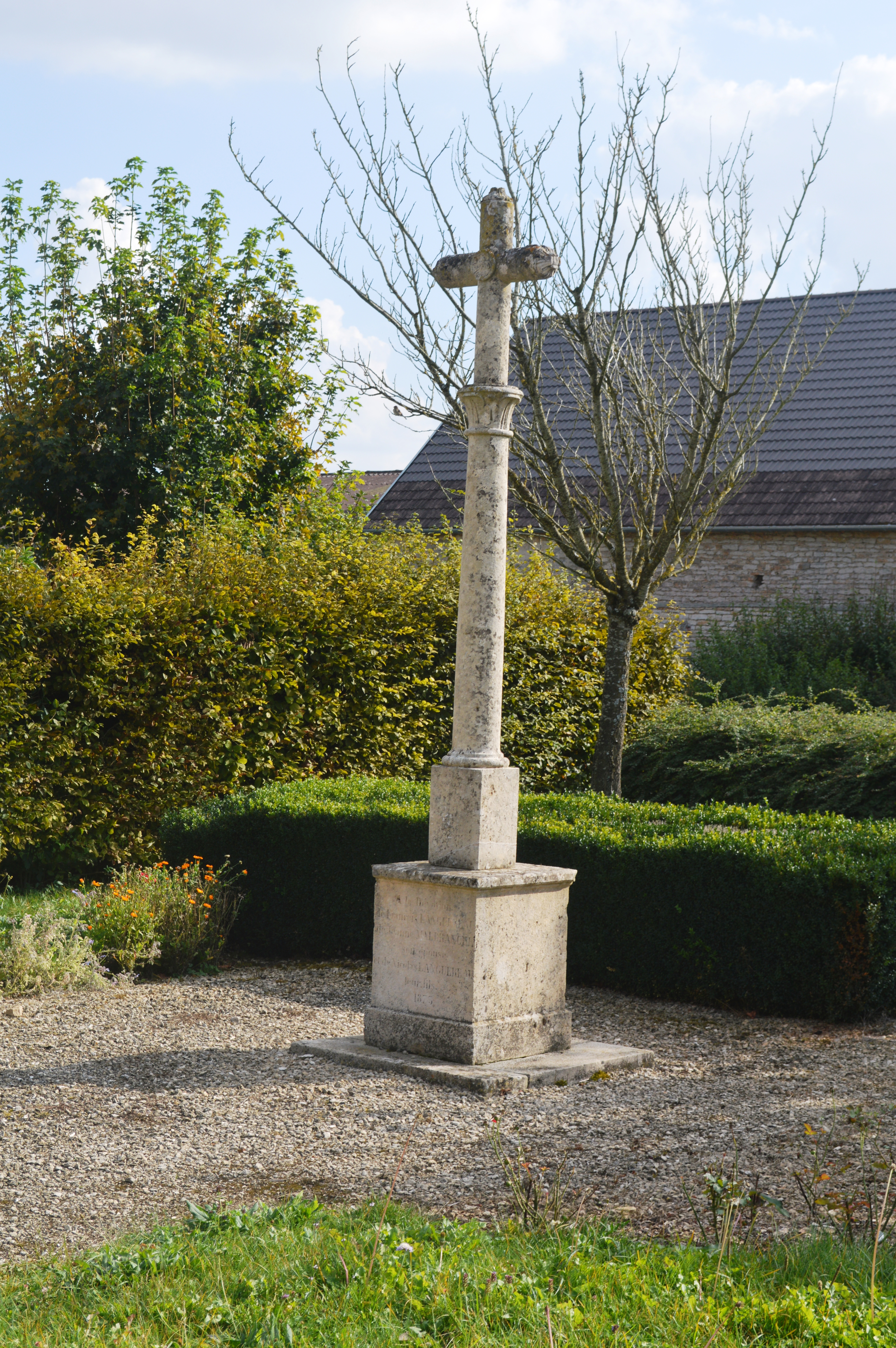
The Monumental Cross at Ampilly-le-Haut

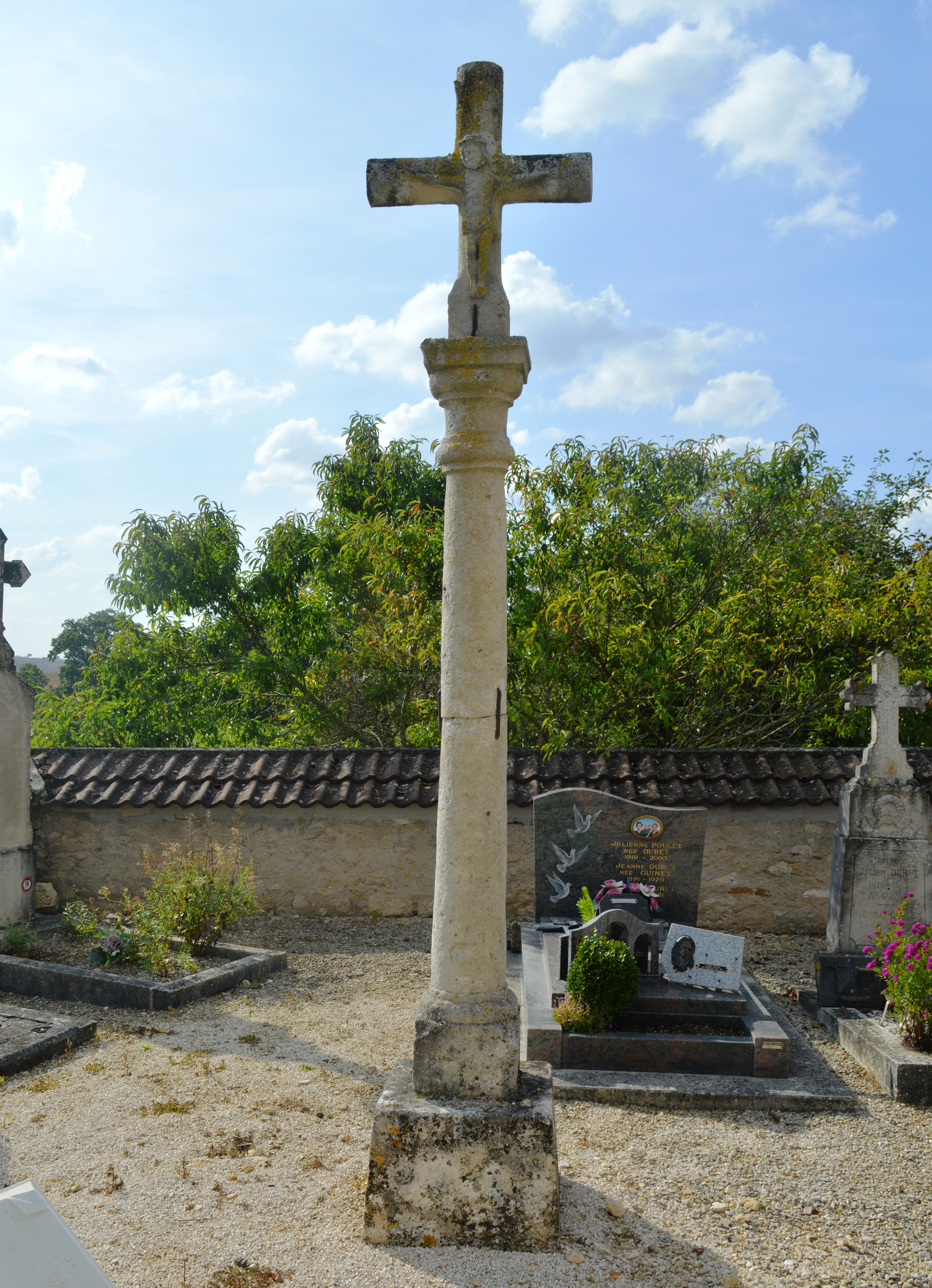
The Cemetery Cross

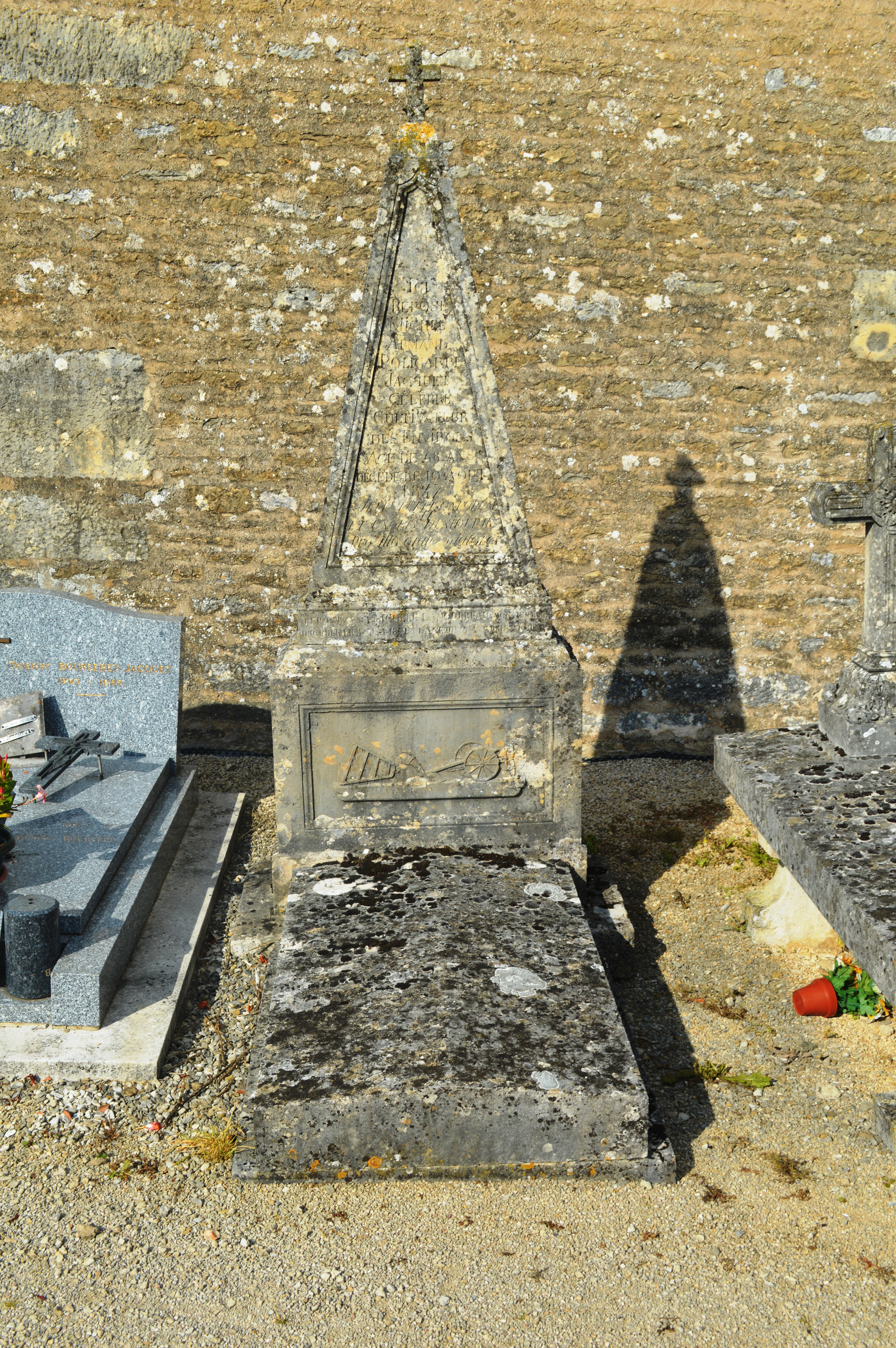
The Tomb of Michel Armand Polycarpe Jacquet

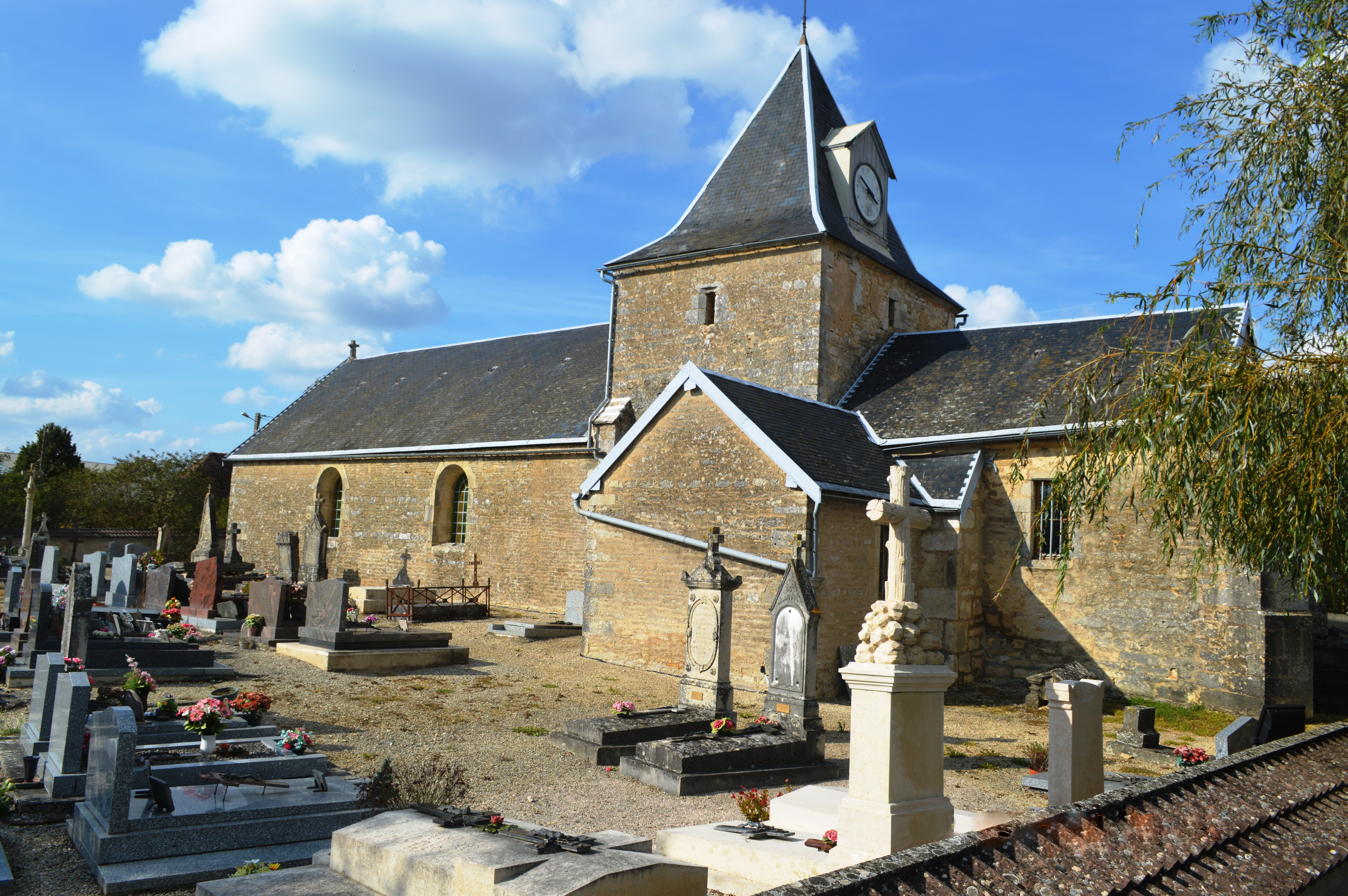
The Church of the Assumption

== See also ==
- Communes of the Côte-d'Or department
