= Uchentein =

Commune in Ariège, France

- Part of Bordes-Uchentein
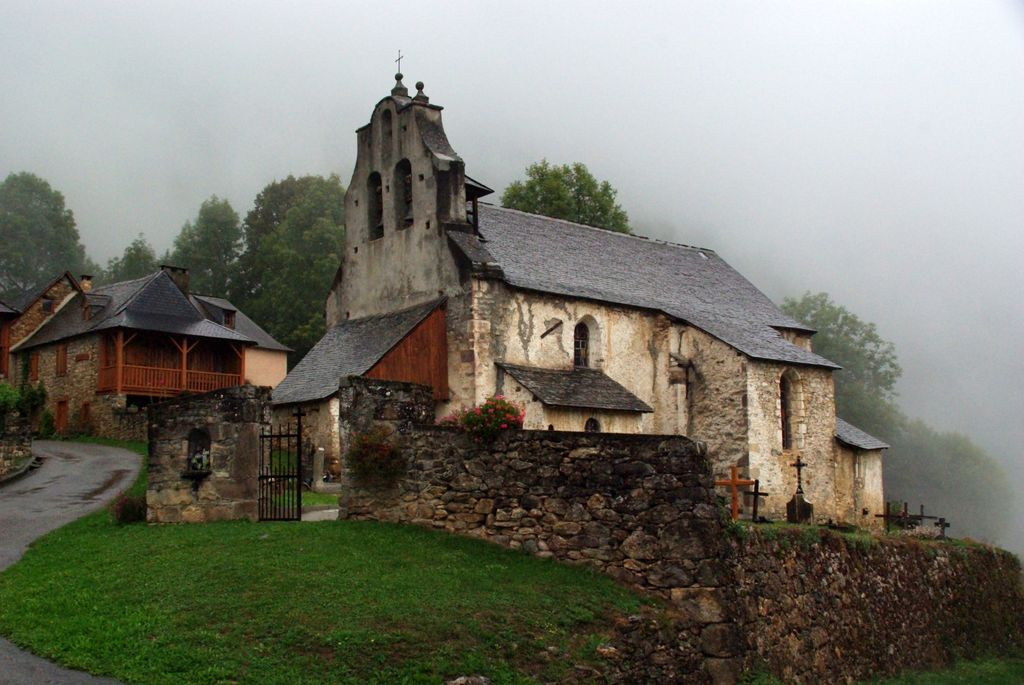
- The church in Uchentein
- Location of Uchentein
- Location within France Location within Occitanie
- Coordinates: 42°53′21″N 1°00′06″E
- Country: France
- Region: Occitania
- Department: Ariège
- Arrondissement: Saint-Girons
- Canton: Couserans Ouest
- Commune: Bordes-Uchentein
- Area^{1}: 4.02 km^{2} (1.55 sq mi)
- Elevation: 968 m (3,176 ft)
- Highest elevation: 1,360 m (4,460 ft)
- Lowest elevation: 640 m (2,100 ft)
- Population (2021): 19
  - Density: 4.7/km^{2} (12/sq mi)
- Time zone: UTC+01:00 (CET)
  - Summer (DST): UTC+02:00 (CEST)
- Postal code: 09800
- ^{1} French Land Register data, which excludes lakes, ponds, glaciers > 1 km^{2} (0.386 sq mi or 247 acres) and river estuaries.

Uchentein is a former commune in the Ariège department in southwestern France. On 1 January 2017, it was merged into the new commune Bordes-Uchentein.

== See also ==
- Communes of the Ariège department
