= Jours-lès-Baigneux =

- Commune
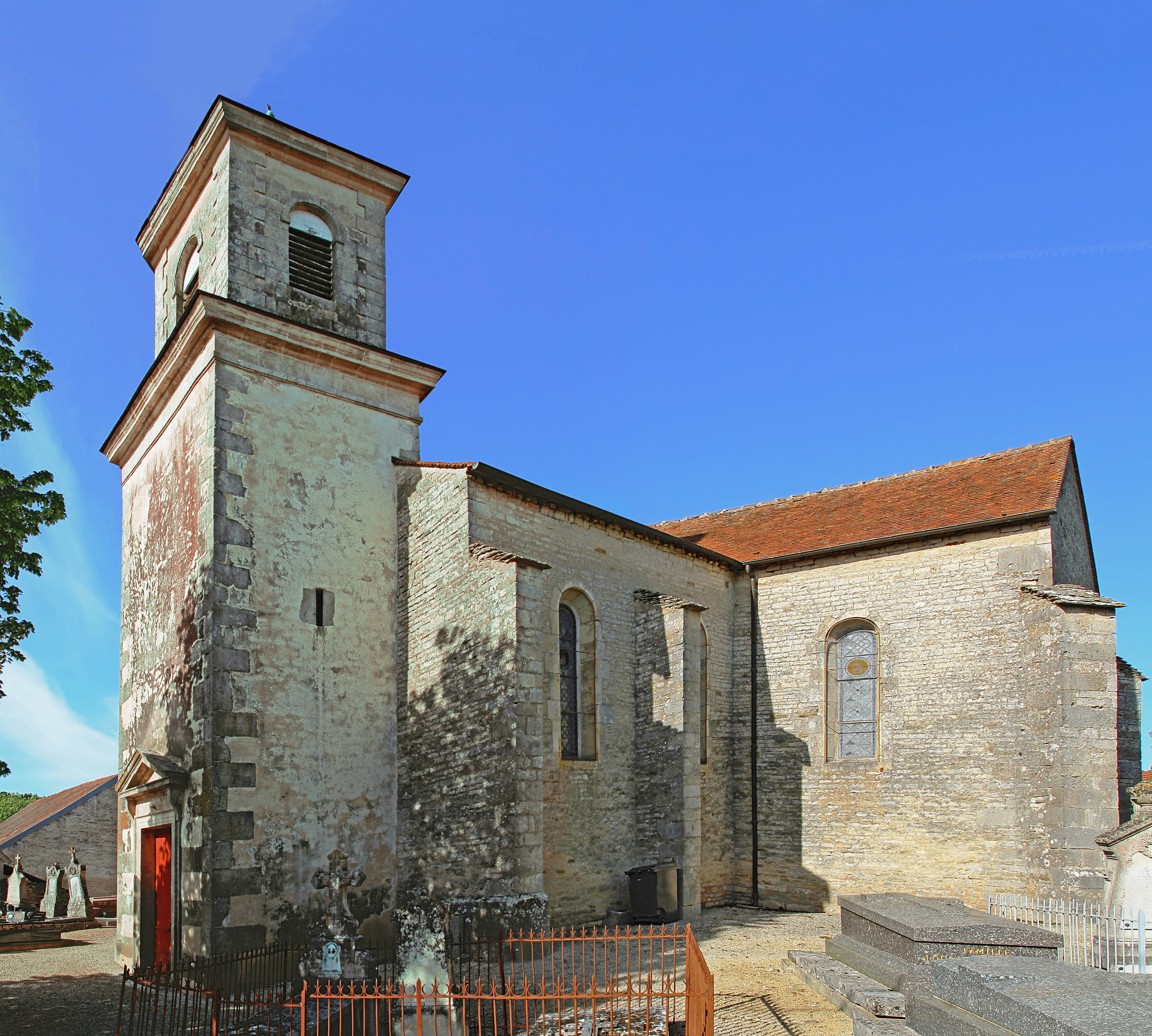
- The church in Jours-lès-Baigneux

- Coat of arms
- Location of Jours-lès-Baigneux
- Location within France Location within Bourgogne-Franche-Comté
- Coordinates: 47°37′50″N 4°36′02″E
- Country: France
- Region: Bourgogne-Franche-Comté
- Department: Côte-d'Or
- Arrondissement: Montbard
- Canton: Châtillon-sur-Seine
- Intercommunality: Pays Châtillonnais

Government
  - Mayor (2020–2026): Thierry Aubry
- Area^{1}: 11.2 km^{2} (4.3 sq mi)
- Elevation: 370 m (1,210 ft)
- Highest elevation: 412 m (1,352 ft)
- Lowest elevation: 351 m (1,152 ft)
- Population (2023): 100
  - Density: 8.9/km^{2} (23/sq mi)
- Time zone: UTC+01:00 (CET)
  - Summer (DST): UTC+02:00 (CEST)
- INSEE/Postal code: 21326 /21450
- ^{1} French Land Register data, which excludes lakes, ponds, glaciers > 1 km^{2} (0.386 sq mi or 247 acres) and river estuaries.

Jours-lès-Baigneux (French pronunciation: [ʒuʁ le bɛɲø], literally Jours near Baigneux) is a commune in the Côte-d'Or department in eastern France.

== Population ==
Historical population
Year	Pop.	±% p.a.
1968	128	—
1975	106	−2.66%
1982	86	−2.94%
1990	86	+0.00%
1999	88	+0.26%
2007	85	−0.43%
2012	96	+2.46%
2017	76	−4.56%
2023	100	+4.68%
Source: INSEE

== See also ==
- Communes of the Côte-d'Or department
