= Bordes-Uchentein =

Commune in Occitanie, France

- Commune
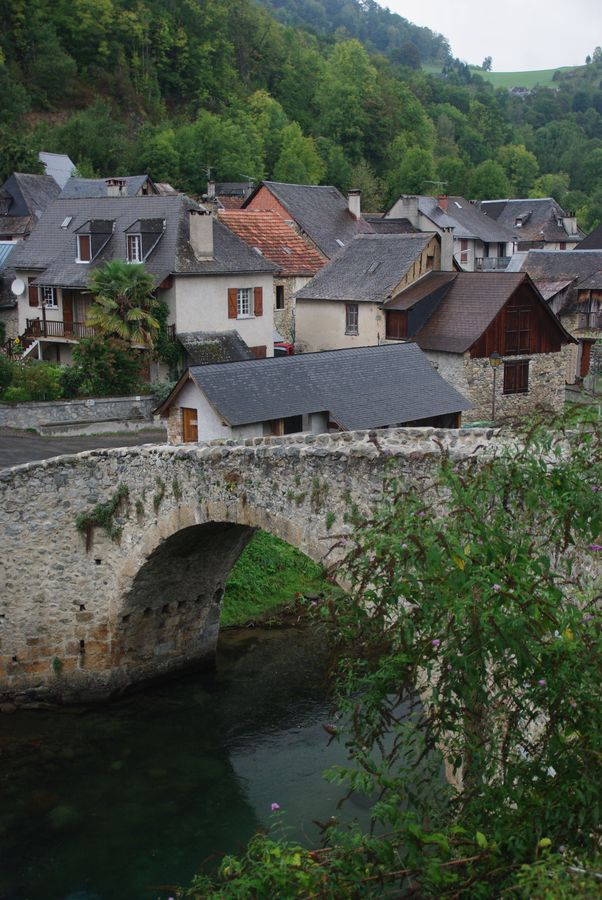
- The 13th century bridge in Les Bordes-sur-Lez

- Coat of arms
- Location of Bordes-Uchentein
- Location within France Location within Occitanie
- Coordinates: 42°53′53″N 1°01′48″E
- Country: France
- Region: Occitania
- Department: Ariège
- Arrondissement: Saint-Girons
- Canton: Couserans Ouest
- Intercommunality: Couserans - Pyrénées
- Area^{1}: 54.48 km^{2} (21.03 sq mi)
- Population (2023): 219
  - Density: 4.02/km^{2} (10.4/sq mi)
- Time zone: UTC+01:00 (CET)
  - Summer (DST): UTC+02:00 (CEST)
- INSEE/Postal code: 09062 /09800
- ^{1} French Land Register data, which excludes lakes, ponds, glaciers > 1 km^{2} (0.386 sq mi or 247 acres) and river estuaries.

Bordes-Uchentein is a commune in the department of Ariège, southern France. The municipality was established on 1 January 2017 by merger of the former communes of Les Bordes-sur-Lez (the seat) and Uchentein.

== See also ==
- Communes of the Ariège department
