= Armonia Bordes =

French politician (born 1945)

Member of the European Parliament
- In office 20 July 1999 – 19 July 2004
- Constituency: France

Personal details
- Born: 3 May 1945 (age 80) Toulouse, Haute-Garonne, France
- Party: Revolutionary Communist League, Workers' Struggle
- Occupation: Politician

Armonia Bordes is a French politician, who, from 1999 until 2004, was a Member of the European Parliament representing France. She was elected as a joint candidate for the Revolutionary Communist League and Workers' Struggle.

== Parliamentary service ==
- Member, Committee on Women's Rights and Equal Opportunities (1999-2002, 2002–2004)
- Member, Committee on Economic and Monetary Affairs (1999-2002, 2002–2004)
- Member, Delegations to the parliamentary cooperation committees and delegations for relations with Kazakhstan, Kyrgyzstan, Uzbekistan, Tajikistan, Turkmenistan and Mongolia (1999-2002)
- Member, Delegation to the EU-Kazakhstan, EU-Kyrgyzstan and EU-Uzbekistan Parliamentary Cooperation Committees and Delegation for relations with Tajikistan, Turkmenistan and Mongolia (2002-2004)
