= Les Bordes-sur-Lez =

Part of Bordes-Uchentein in Occitanie, France

- Part of Bordes-Uchentein
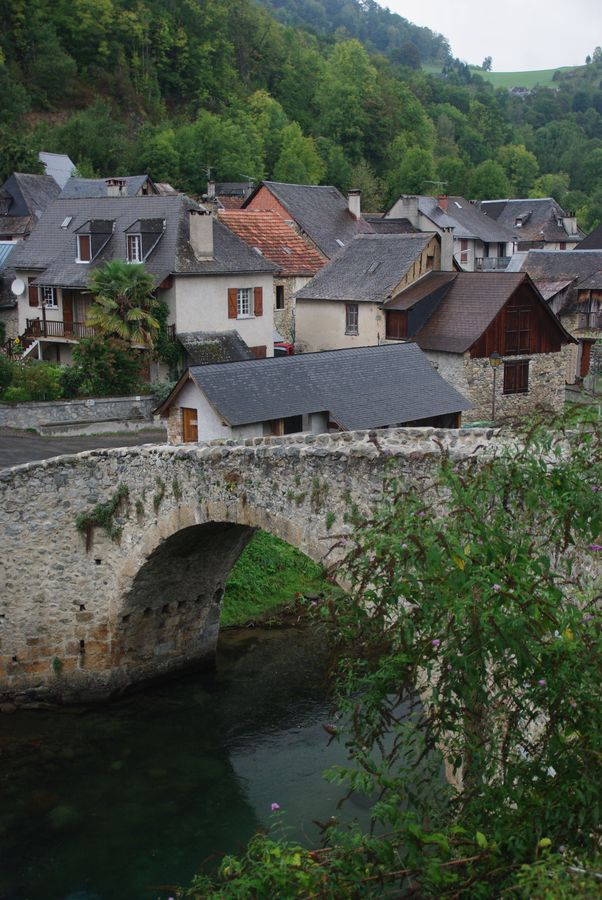
- The bridge in Les Bordes-sur-Lez
- Location of Les Bordes-sur-Lez
- Location within France Location within Occitanie
- Coordinates: 42°53′55″N 1°01′50″E
- Country: France
- Region: Occitania
- Department: Ariège
- Arrondissement: Saint-Girons
- Canton: Couserans Ouest
- Commune: Bordes-Uchentein
- Area^{1}: 50.46 km^{2} (19.48 sq mi)
- Elevation: 560 m (1,840 ft)
- Highest elevation: 2,838 m (9,311 ft)
- Lowest elevation: 548 m (1,798 ft)
- Population (2021): 194
  - Density: 3.84/km^{2} (9.96/sq mi)
- Time zone: UTC+01:00 (CET)
  - Summer (DST): UTC+02:00 (CEST)
- Postal code: 09800
- ^{1} French Land Register data, which excludes lakes, ponds, glaciers > 1 km^{2} (0.386 sq mi or 247 acres) and river estuaries.

Les Bordes-sur-Lez is a former commune in the Ariège department of southwestern France. On 1 January 2017, it was merged into the new commune Bordes-Uchentein. Inhabitants of Les Bordes-sur-Lez are called Bordelais in French.

== See also ==
- Communes of the Ariège department
