= Juan Bordes =

Spanish sculptor

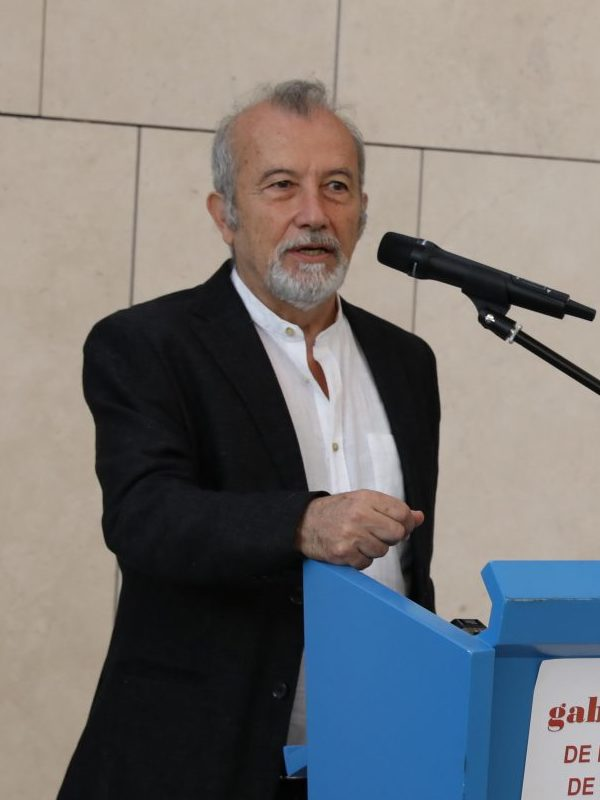
- Juan Bordes en 2017
- Born: 15 July 1948
- Occupation: Sculptor, architect, artist
- Website: www.juanbordes.com

Juan Bordes. also known as Juan Bordes Caballero (July 15, 1948 in Gran Canaria), is a Spanish sculptor. specializing in the portrayal of the human figure. He is the author of several books, the organizer of convention programs, and the subject of exhibitions.

== Biography ==
Bordes was born in Las Palmas de Gran Canaria on July 15, 1948. From 1957-60 he attended sculpture courses at the School of Las Palmas Luján Pérez with Abraham Cárdenas. From 1965-1972 he studied in Madrid, attending the School of Architecture of Madrid (ETSA), the School of Ceramics Moncloa and Life drawing classes in free Círculo de Bellas Artes in Madrid. In 1976, he started teaching at ETSA Madrid, becoming a professor of Architectural Composition there in 1988, and in 1986 received a PhD from the University of Madrid with a thesis "La escultura como elemento de composición en el edificio. Su normativa en la Tratadística española, francesa e italiana", under the direction of Juan Navarro.

He is a Corresponding Member of the Real Academia Canaria de Bellas Artes de San Miguel Arcángel, an academician of the Real Academia de Bellas Artes de San Fernando. He has received fellowships from CINFE, and at the Academia Española in Rome.

== Works ==
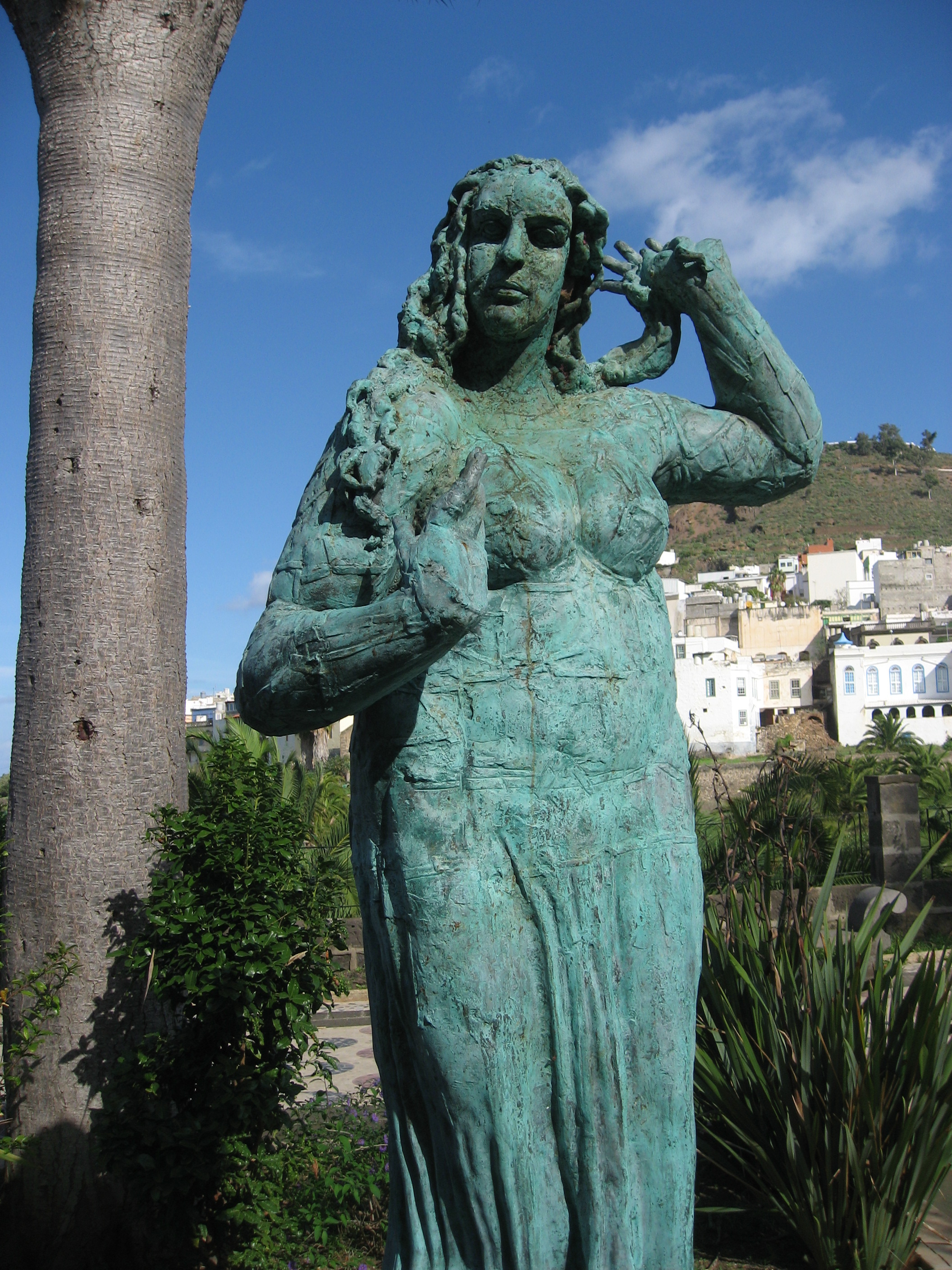
Araucas. Bronze statue in Araucas, Gran Canaria.

His works are held in the Atlantic Center of Modern Art, Las Palmas de Gran Canaria; the Museo de Arte Contemporáneo, Caracas (Venezuela); the Museo de Arte Contemporáneo, Seville; the Biblioteca Nacional de España, Madrid; Colección Renfe, Madrid; Colección Mapfre, Madrid; Colección Fenosa; Universidad de Valencia; Colección de Arte Contemporáneo, Castilla-La Mancha; Museo Popular de Arte Contemporáneo, Vilafamés, Castellón de la Plana; Asociación Canaria de Amigos del Arte Contemporáneo, Santa Cruz de Tenerife; and Colegio de Arquitectos, Las Palmas de Gran Canaria.

== Publications ==
- (with Domingo Antonio de Velasco, and Juan José Gómez Molma) Tratado de anatomía exterior. Salamanca: Universidad de Salamanca, 1987. ISBN 9788474814606
- Historia de las teorías de la figura humana: el dibujo, la anatomía, la proporción, la fisiognomía. Madrid: Cátedra, 2003. ISBN 9788437620992
- (ed. with Delia López Martín. Siguiendo el rastro del arquitecto: Exposición celebrada en la Biblioteca de la Escuela Técnica Superior de Arquitectura de la Universidad de Las Palmas de Gran Canaria : mayo 2007. Las Palmas de Gran Canaria: Universidad, 2009. OCLC 644383400
- (with Ole Larsen, Per Johnsson, and Nieves Viadero). La plancha de cobre como si fuera papel...: obra gráfica (1973-2005). Las Palmas de Gran Canaria: Cabildo de Gran Canaria, Centro de Artes Plásticas, 2006. ISBN 9788481034547
- (with Fernando Castro Flórez.) Corpus meum, in anima tua: [exposición, Hospedería de Fonseca, Salamanca, de 17 marzo a 13 junio de 2004; Palacio Los Serranos, Ávila, febrero - abril]. Salamanca: Universidad de Salam ISBN 9788478006182
- Toys of the Avant-Garde : 4 October 2010-30 January 2011 : Museo Picasso Málaga
- La urbanización del ocio : [hacia el establecimiento de un modelo de ciudad para vacaciones en el archipiélago canario]. Mutua Guanarteme, 1990.
