= Étormay =

- Commune
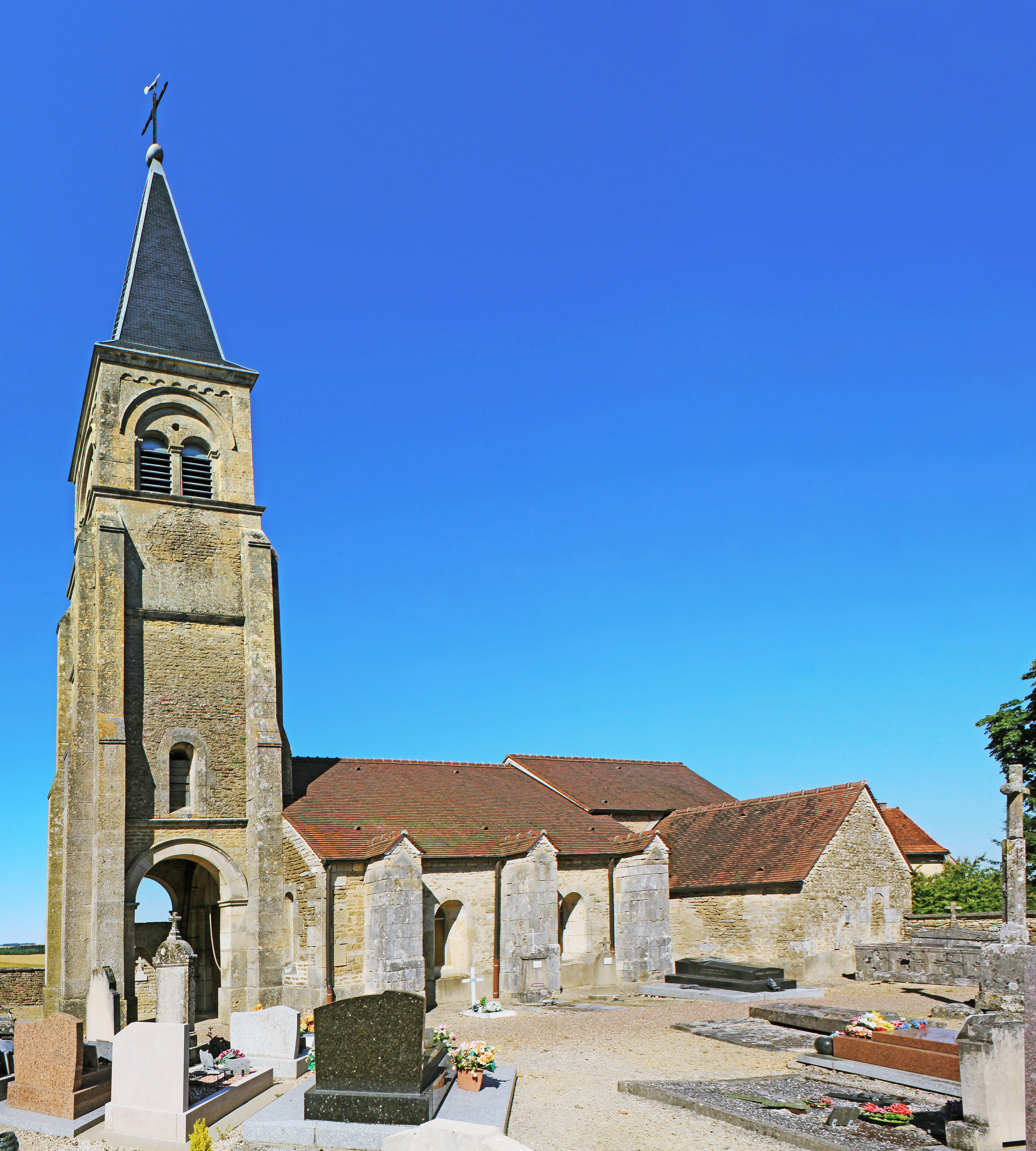
- The church in Étormay

- Coat of arms
- Location of Étormay
- Location within France Location within Bourgogne-Franche-Comté
- Coordinates: 47°35′53″N 4°34′33″E
- Country: France
- Region: Bourgogne-Franche-Comté
- Department: Côte-d'Or
- Arrondissement: Montbard
- Canton: Châtillon-sur-Seine
- Intercommunality: Pays Châtillonnais

Government
  - Mayor (2020–2026): François Moyot
- Area^{1}: 12.6 km^{2} (4.9 sq mi)
- Elevation: 415 m (1,362 ft)
- Highest elevation: 422 m (1,385 ft)
- Lowest elevation: 355 m (1,165 ft)
- Population (2023): 66
  - Density: 5.2/km^{2} (14/sq mi)
- Time zone: UTC+01:00 (CET)
  - Summer (DST): UTC+02:00 (CEST)
- INSEE/Postal code: 21257 /21450
- ^{1} French Land Register data, which excludes lakes, ponds, glaciers > 1 km^{2} (0.386 sq mi or 247 acres) and river estuaries.

Étormay (French pronunciation: [etɔʁmɛ]) is a commune in the Côte-d'Or department in eastern France.

== Population ==
Historical population
Year	Pop.	±% p.a.
1968	70	—
1975	71	+0.20%
1982	75	+0.79%
1990	53	−4.25%
1999	47	−1.33%
2007	59	+2.88%
2012	85	+7.58%
2017	67	−4.65%
2023	66	−0.25%
Source: INSEE

== See also ==
- Communes of the Côte-d'Or department
