= La Celle-les-Bordes =

- Commune
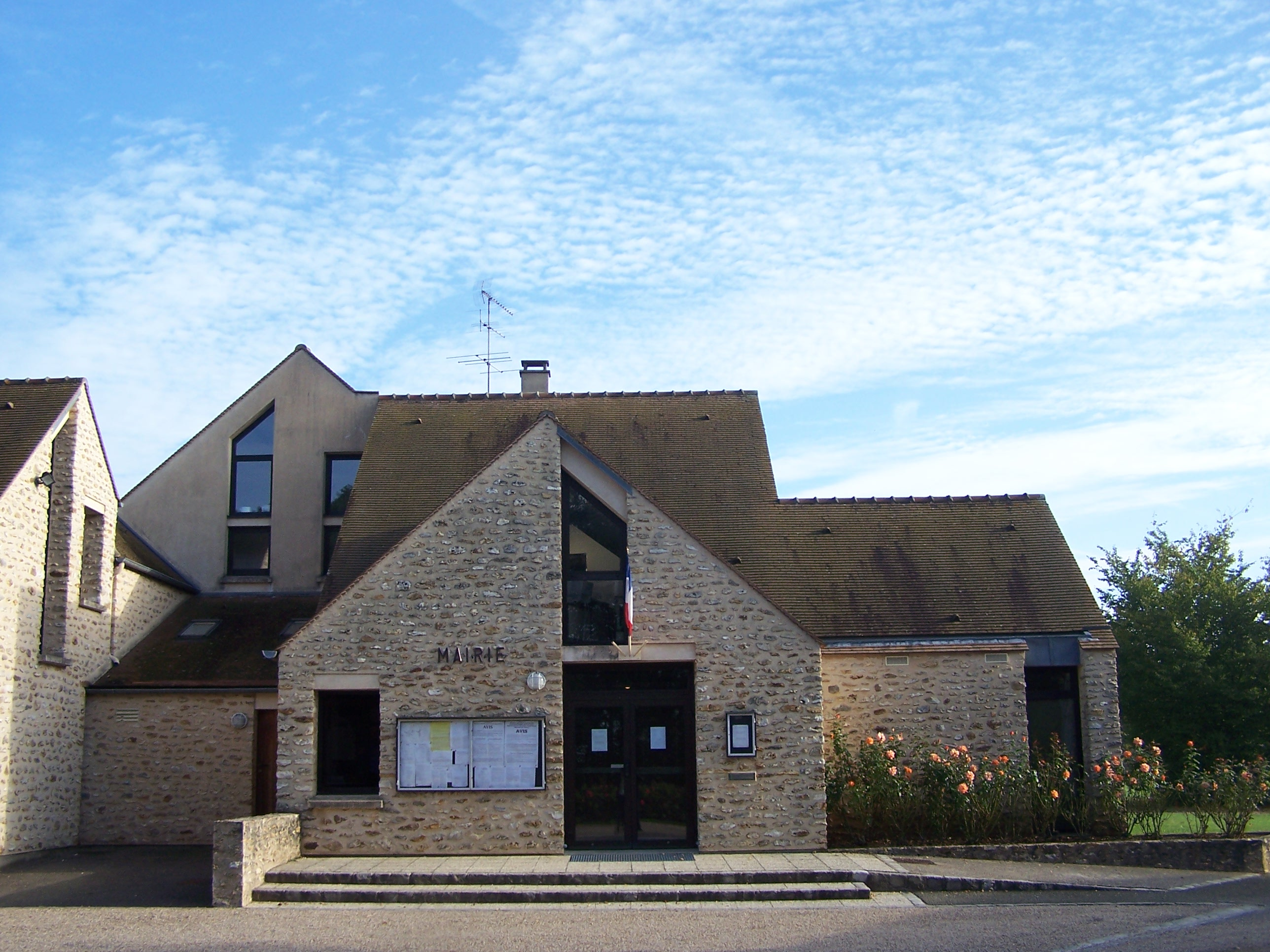
- Town hall
- Location of La Celle-les-Bordes
- Location within France Location within Île-de-France (region)
- Coordinates: 48°38′16″N 1°57′18″E
- Country: France
- Region: Île-de-France
- Department: Yvelines
- Arrondissement: Rambouillet
- Canton: Rambouillet
- Intercommunality: CA Rambouillet Territoires

Government
  - Mayor (2020–2026): Serge Querard
- Area^{1}: 22.6 km^{2} (8.7 sq mi)
- Elevation: 125 m (410 ft)
- Highest elevation: 177 m (581 ft)
- Lowest elevation: 110 m (360 ft)
- Population (2023): 840
  - Density: 37/km^{2} (96/sq mi)
- Time zone: UTC+01:00 (CET)
  - Summer (DST): UTC+02:00 (CEST)
- INSEE/Postal code: 78125 /78720
- ^{1} French Land Register data, which excludes lakes, ponds, glaciers > 1 km^{2} (0.386 sq mi or 247 acres) and river estuaries.

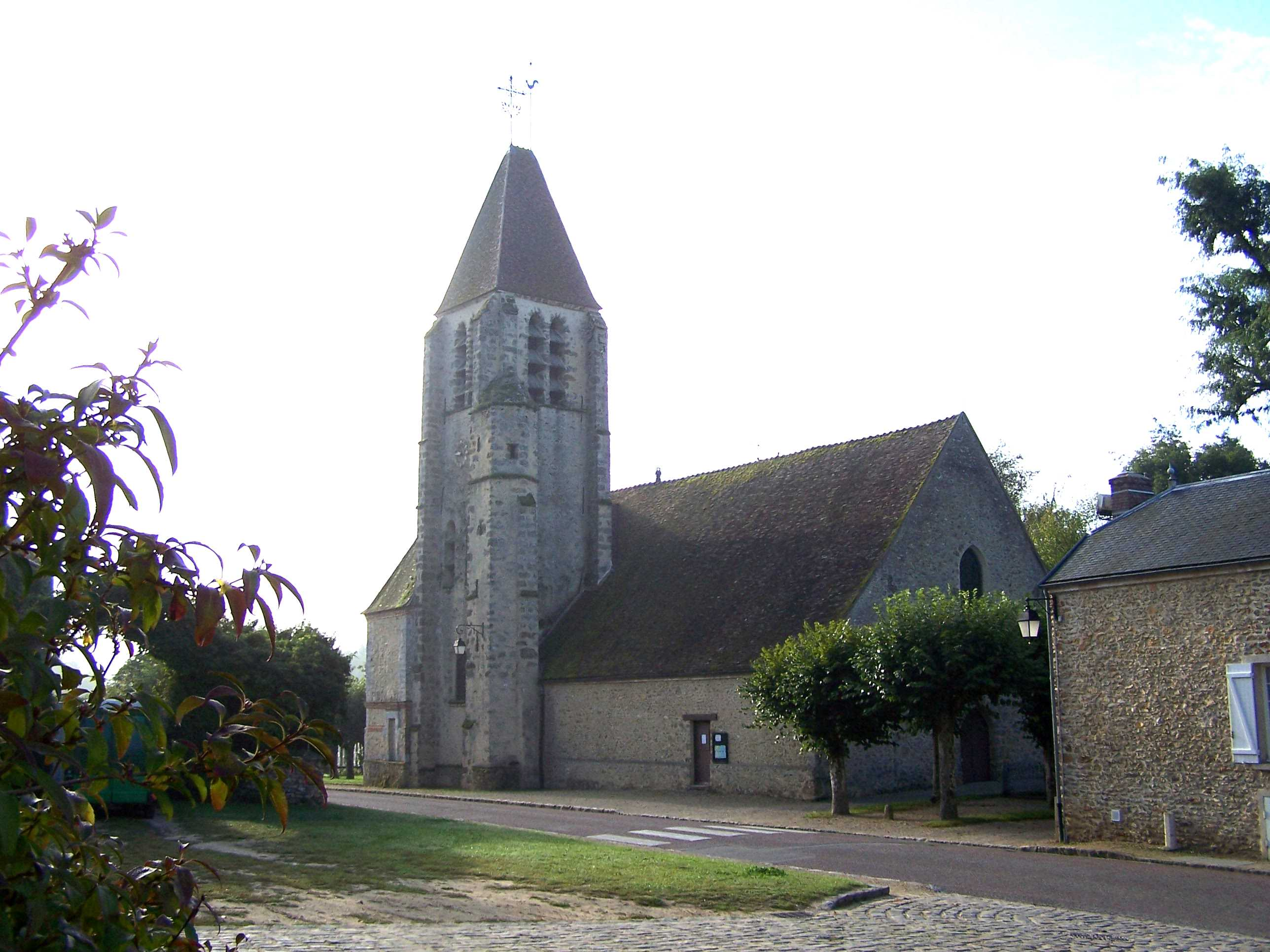
Saint-Germain

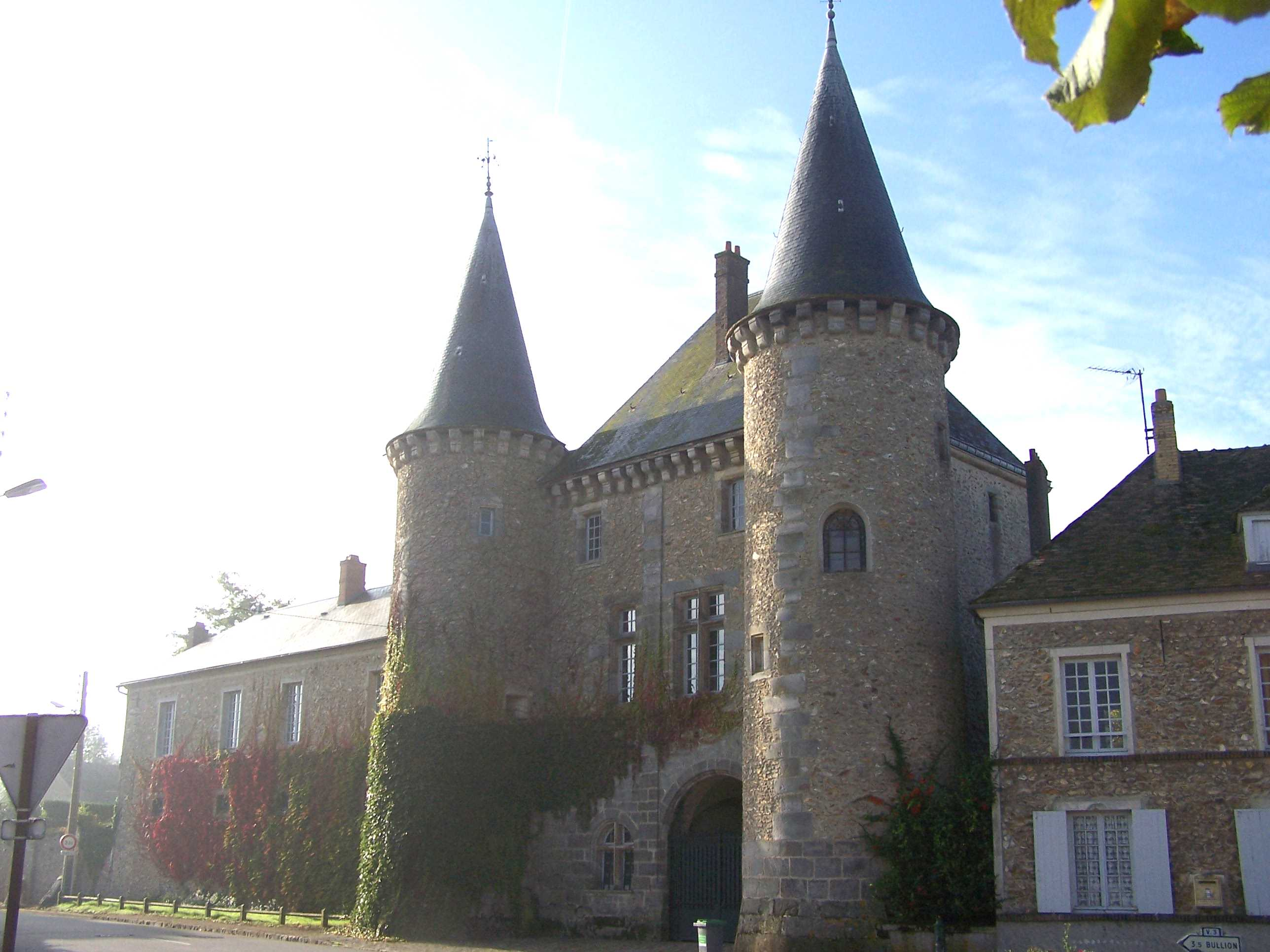
Chateau of Bordes

La Celle-les-Bordes (French pronunciation: [la sɛl le bɔʁd]) is a commune in the Yvelines department in the Île-de-France region in north-central France.

== See also ==
- Communes of the Yvelines department
