= Jabreilles-les-Bordes =

- Commune
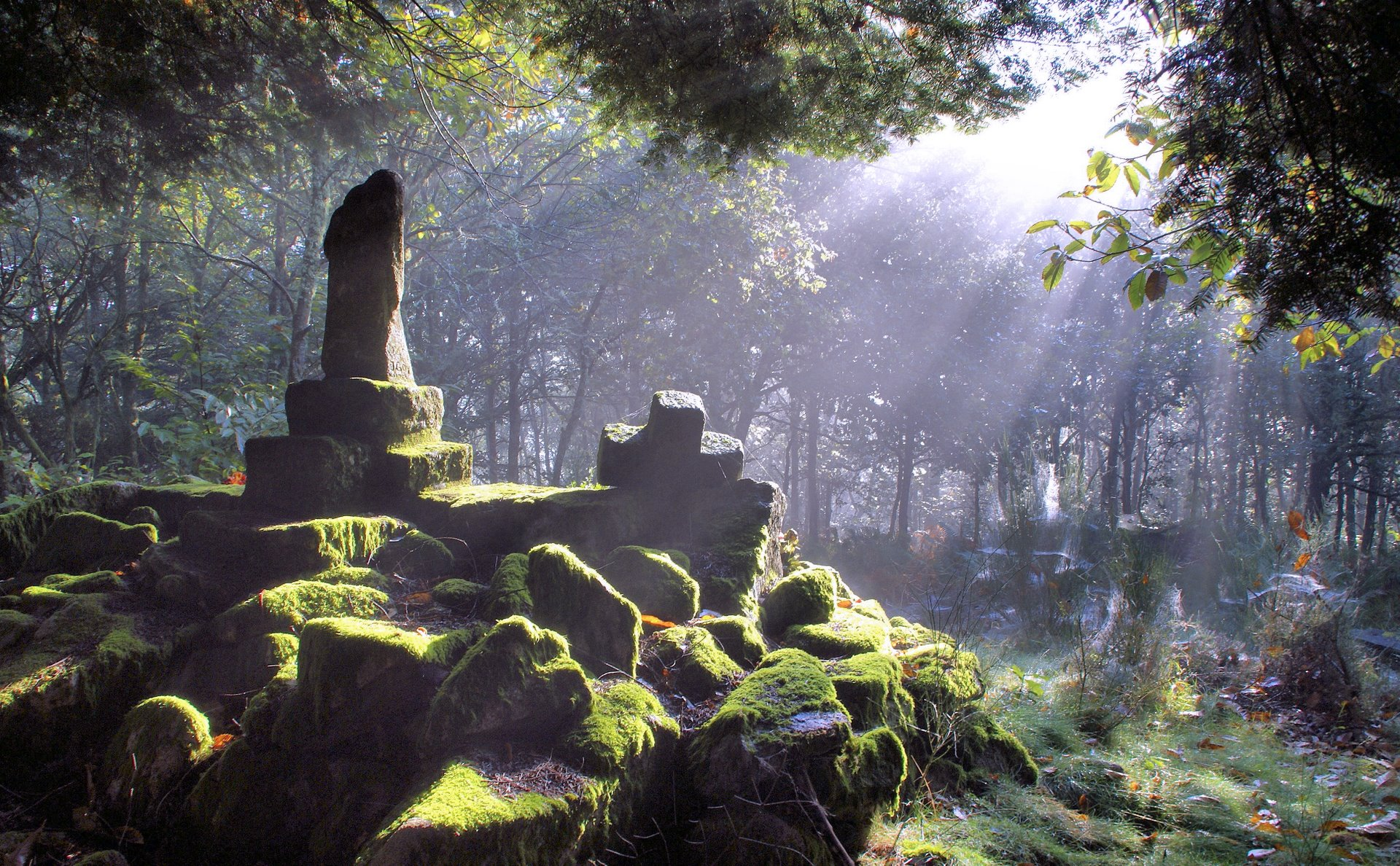
- The Altar of the Virgin, at the summit of the Puy de Jabreilles
- Location of Jabreilles-les-Bordes
- Location within France Location within Nouvelle-Aquitaine
- Coordinates: 46°01′05″N 1°30′58″E
- Country: France
- Region: Nouvelle-Aquitaine
- Department: Haute-Vienne
- Arrondissement: Limoges
- Canton: Ambazac
- Intercommunality: Élan Limousin Avenir Nature

Government
  - Mayor (2020–2026): Vincent Carré
- Area^{1}: 19.05 km^{2} (7.36 sq mi)
- Highest elevation: 651 m (2,136 ft)
- Lowest elevation: 354 m (1,161 ft)
- Population (2023): 242
  - Density: 12.7/km^{2} (32.9/sq mi)
- Time zone: UTC+01:00 (CET)
  - Summer (DST): UTC+02:00 (CEST)
- INSEE/Postal code: 87076 /87370
- ^{1} French Land Register data, which excludes lakes, ponds, glaciers > 1 km^{2} (0.386 sq mi or 247 acres) and river estuaries.

Jabreilles-les-Bordes (French pronunciation: [ʒabʁɛj le bɔʁd]; Occitan: Jabrelhas) is a commune in the Haute-Vienne department in the Nouvelle-Aquitaine region in west-central France.

== Population ==
Inhabitants are known as Jabreillauds in French.

Historical population
Year	Pop.	±% p.a.
1968	273	—
1975	250	−1.25%
1982	211	−2.39%
1990	203	−0.48%
1999	229	+1.35%
2007	263	+1.75%
2012	264	+0.08%
2017	239	−1.97%
2023	242	+0.21%
Source: INSEE

== See also ==
- Communes of the Haute-Vienne department
