= Chanceaux =

- Commune
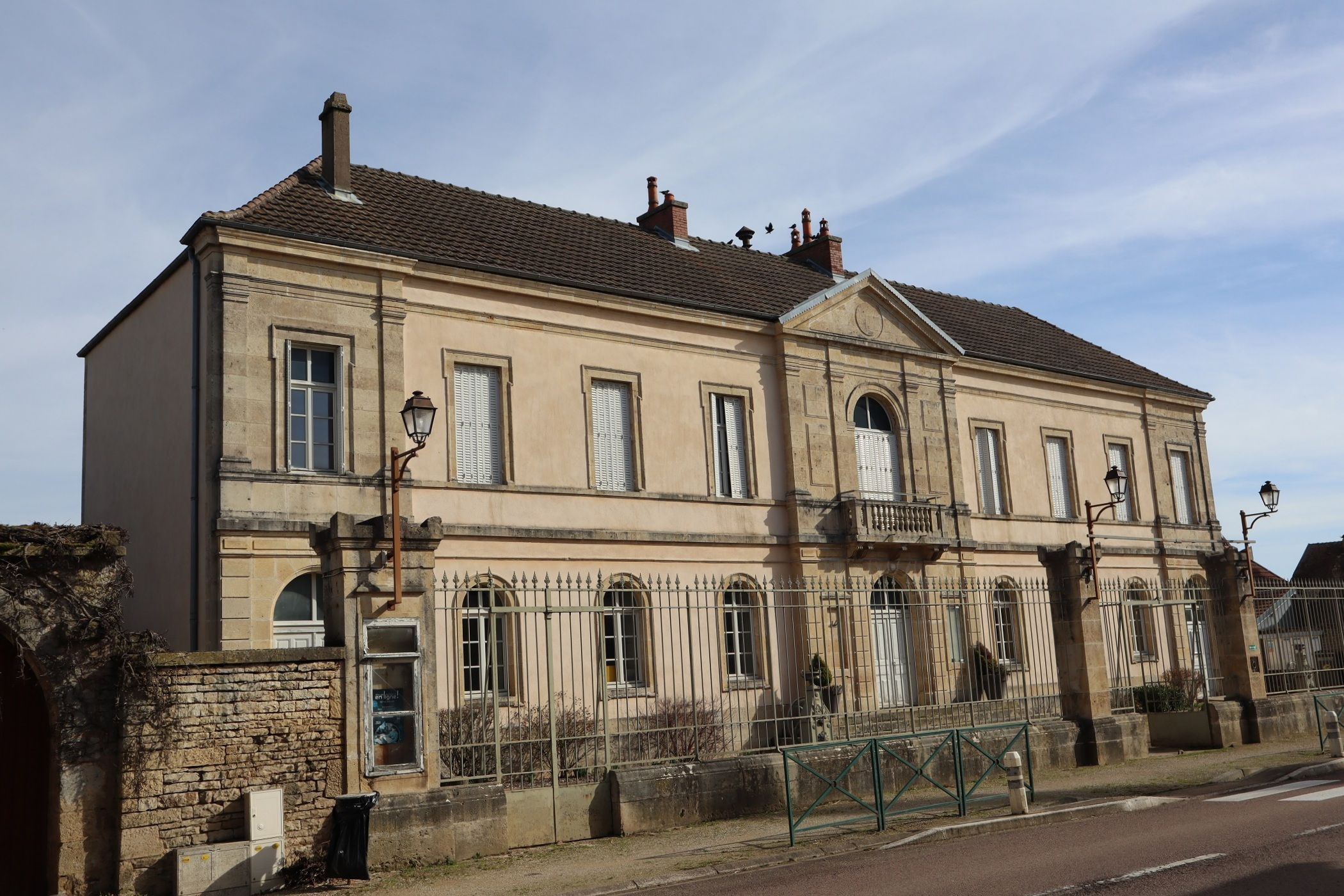
- Town hall
- Location of Chanceaux
- Location within France Location within Bourgogne-Franche-Comté
- Coordinates: 47°31′12″N 4°43′07″E
- Country: France
- Region: Bourgogne-Franche-Comté
- Department: Côte-d'Or
- Arrondissement: Dijon
- Canton: Is-sur-Tille

Government
  - Mayor (2020–2026): Vincent Pierrot
- Area^{1}: 21.27 km^{2} (8.21 sq mi)
- Elevation: 461 m (1,512 ft)
- Highest elevation: 519 m (1,703 ft)
- Lowest elevation: 390 m (1,280 ft)
- Population (2023): 202
  - Density: 9.50/km^{2} (24.6/sq mi)
- Time zone: UTC+01:00 (CET)
  - Summer (DST): UTC+02:00 (CEST)
- INSEE/Postal code: 21142 /21440
- ^{1} French Land Register data, which excludes lakes, ponds, glaciers > 1 km^{2} (0.386 sq mi or 247 acres) and river estuaries.

Chanceaux (French pronunciation: [ʃɑ̃so]) is a commune in the Côte-d'Or department in eastern France.

Chanceaux is located 5 kilometers from the source of the Seine.

== Population ==
Historical population
Year	Pop.	±% p.a.
1968	265	—
1975	232	−1.88%
1982	219	−0.82%
1990	219	+0.00%
1999	208	−0.57%
2007	192	−1.00%
2012	224	+3.13%
2017	218	−0.54%
2023	202	−1.26%
Source: INSEE

== See also ==
- Communes of the Côte-d'Or department
