= Captive audience =

Captive audience may refer to:

== Law ==
- Captive audience meeting, a mandatory meeting used by employers to oppose unionization
- A legal concept in:
  - Rowan v. United States Post Office Department, 1970, in which the United States Supreme Court created a quasi-exception to free speech in cases in which a person is held as a "captive audience"
  - Lehman v. Shaker Heights, 1974, in which the U.S. Supreme Court upheld a city's ban on political advertising within its public transportation system
  - Packer Corporation v. Utah, 1932, about a conflict between First Amendment rights with the public's right of privacy, advancing a theory of the "captive audience"

== Arts and entertainment ==
=== Television ===
- "Captive Audience", an episode of Alfred Hitchcock Presents, 1962
- "Captive Audience", an episode of Pacific Blues, 1996
- "Captive Audience", an episode of Red vs. Blue, 2011
- "Captive Audience", a 2011 episode of web TV anthology Suite 7
- "That's My Dad / The Captain's Bird / Captive Audience", an episode of The Love Boat, 1980
- Captive Audience: A Real American Horror Story, a 2022 three-part docuseries about the kidnapping of Steven Stayner

=== Literature ===
- Captive Audience: The Telecom Industry and Monopoly Power in the New Gilded Age, a 2013 non-fiction book by Susan P. Crawford
- Captive Audience, a 1988 book of poetry by Bob Perelman
- Captive Audience, a 1996 book of poetry by Paul Henry
- Captive Audience, a 1975 novel by Jessica Mann
- "Captive Audience", a 1959 short story in The Bird of Time by Wallace West
- "Captive Audience", a 2002 short story by Frances Hardinge
- Captive Audience, a 1979 play by Desmond Forristal

=== Music ===
- "Captive Audience", a song by Say Anything from the 2019 album Oliver Appropriate

=== Visual arts ===
- Captive Audience, a 2019 work by artist Najee Dorsey
- Captive Audience, a 2001 work by sculptor David Reekie
- Auditoire captivé ('A captive audience'), an 1877 painting by Frédéric Samuel Cordey

== See also ==
- Captive market
