= Mirepoix (disambiguation) =

Mirepoix is a traditional French culinary combination of onions, carrots and celery aromatics.

Mirepoix may also refer to:

- Mirepoix, Ariège, a commune in France
  - Mirepoix Cathedral
- Mirepoix, Gers, a commune in France
- Mirepoix-sur-Tarn, a commune in the Haute-Garonne département
