= Ancient Diocese of Mirepoix =

Roman Catholic diocese in France (1317 - 1801)

Coordinates: 43.09°N 1.87°E

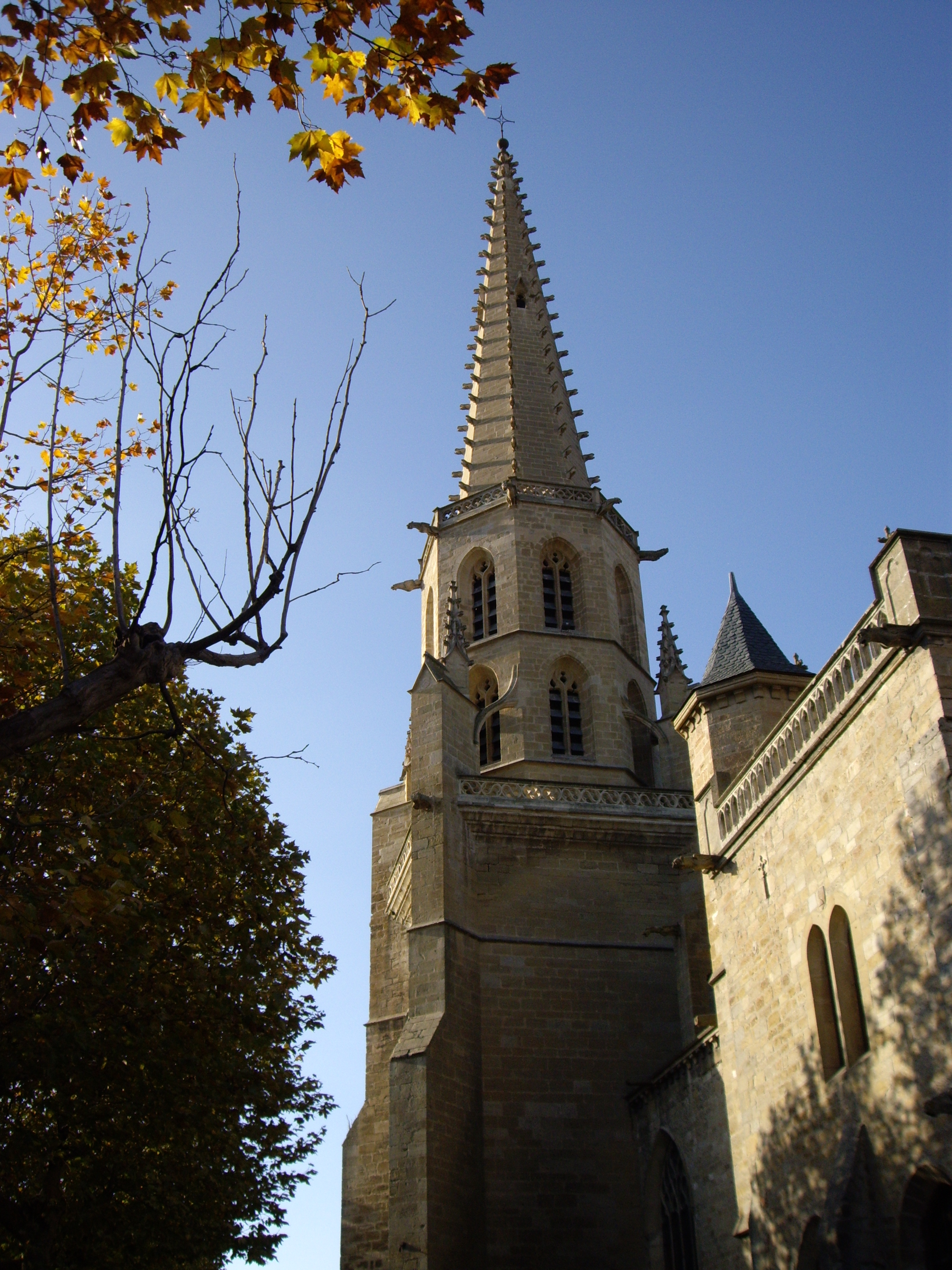
Mirepoix Cathedral.

The former Catholic diocese of Mirepoix, in south-west France, was created in 1317 by Pope John XXII from the diocese of Pamiers. It existed until the French Revolution, and was suffragan of the Archbishop of Toulouse. Its episcopal seat was in Mirepoix Cathedral in Mirepoix, Ariège.

Among its bishops were:

- Raymond Atton d'Auterive 1318–1325
- Jacques Fournier 1326–1327, later Pope Benedict XII
- Pierre de Piret 1327–1348
- Jean I de Cojordan 1348–1361
- Arnaud de Villars 1361–1363 or 1362–1362
- Pierre-Raymond de Barrière 1363–1368 or 1377
- Jean II. 1368 to ca. 1375
- Jean de Proins 1376–1377
- Guillaume de Provines 9 July to 29 September 1377
- Arnaud de La Trémoille 1377 or ca. 1380–1394
- Bertrand de Maumont 1394–1405
- Guillaume du Puy 1405–1431 or 1433
- Guillaume d'Estouteville 1431–1433 or 1440–1441
- Jourdain d'Aure 1433–1441 or 1440
- Eustache de Lévis-Léran 1441–1462 or 1463
- Louis d'Albret 1462–1463
- Jean de Lévis-Léran 1463–1467
- Scipion Damián 1467–1469
- Élie Rivals 1470–1478
- Gabriel du Mas 1478–1486
- Jean d'Espinay 1486–1493
- Vacant 1493–1497
- Philippe de Lévis-Léran 1497–1537
- David Beaton de Balfour 1537–1546
- Claude de La Guiche 1546–1553
- Innocenzo Ciocchi del Monte 1553–1555
- Jean Reuman Suavius (Jean Suau) 1555–1560
- Pierre de Villars I 1561–1576
- Pierre de Villars II 1576–1587
- Pierre Bonsom de Donnaud 1587–1630
- Louis de Nogaret d'Espernon 1630–1655
- Louis-Hercule de Lévis de Ventadour 1655–1679
- Pierre de La Broue 1679–1720
- François-Honoré Casaubon de Maniban 1721–1729 (later archbishop of Bordeaux)
- Jean-François Boyer 1730–1736, preceptor to the Dauphin, father of Louis XVI (1730–1736)
- Quiqueran de Beaujeu 1736–1737
- Jean-Baptiste de Champflour 1737–1768
- François Tristán de Chambón 1768–1790

== See also ==
- Catholic Church in France
- List of Catholic dioceses in France

== Sources ==
=== Reference works ===
- Gams, Pius Bonifatius (1873). Series episcoporum Ecclesiae catholicae: quotquot innotuerunt a beato Petro apostolo. Ratisbon: Typis et Sumptibus Georgii Josephi Manz. (Use with caution; obsolete)
- Eubel, Conradus, ed. (1913). Hierarchia catholica, Tomus 1 (second ed.). Münster: Libreria Regensbergiana. (in Latin)
- Eubel, Conradus, ed. (1914). Hierarchia catholica, Tomus 2 (second ed.). Münster: Libreria Regensbergiana. (in Latin)
- Gulik, Guilelmus (1923). Eubel, Conradus (ed.). Hierarchia catholica, Tomus 3 (second ed.). Münster: Libreria Regensbergiana.
- Gauchat, Patritius (Patrice) (1935). Hierarchia catholica IV (1592-1667). Münster: Libraria Regensbergiana.
- Ritzler, Remigius; Sefrin, Pirminus (1952). Hierarchia catholica medii et recentis aevi V (1667-1730). Patavii: Messagero di S. Antonio.
- Ritzler, Remigius; Sefrin, Pirminus (1958). Hierarchia catholica medii et recentis aevi VI (1730-1799). Patavii: Messagero di S. Antonio.

=== Studies ===
- Duchesne, Louis (1910). Fastes épiscopaux de l'ancienne Gaule: II. L'Aquitaine et les Lyonnaises. Paris: Fontemoing.
- Du Tems, Hugues (1774). Le clergé de France, ou tableau historique et chronologique des archevêques, évêques, abbés, abbesses et chefs des chapitres principaux du royaume, depuis la fondation des églises jusqu'à nos jours (in French). Vol. Tome premier. Paris: Delalain.
- Jean, Armand (1891). Les évêques et les archevêques de France depuis 1682 jusqu'à 1801 (in French). Paris: A. Picard.
