= Jean-François Boyer =

18th-century French Catholic bishop

- Bishop
- Diocese: Ancient Diocese of Mirepoix
- See: Mirepoix, Ariège
- Elected: Member, Académie française (1736); Member, French Academy of Sciences (1738); Member, Academy of Inscriptions and Belles-Lettres (1741)

Personal details
- Born: 12 March 1675
- Died: 20 August 1755 (aged 80)
- Denomination: Roman Catholic

Jean-François Boyer (12 March 1675 in Paris – 20 August 1755 in Versailles), was a French bishop, best known for having been a vehement opponent of Jansenism and the Philosophe school.

== Life ==
Boyer was a preacher, and the bishop of Mirepoix, Ariège from 1730 to 1736. In 1735 he was tutor to Louis, Dauphin of France, and in 1743 he was head chaplain to Maria Josepha of Saxony, Dauphine of France.

In 1736 Boyer was elected a member of the Académie française, in 1738 to the French Academy of Sciences, and in 1741 to the Academy of Inscriptions and Belles-Lettres.

Boyer had several benefices by royal appointment. According to Evelyne Lever, the favorite royal biographer, during the Jubilee Year of 1750 Pope Benedict XIV Boyer tried unsuccessfully to break the relationship between the King and Madame de Pompadour.

Boyer promulgated the "Statements of Confession" that the faithful had to sign to show their compliance with Pope Clement XI's Unigenitus Bull, and to be entitled to receive the sacrament. This caused an outcry in Paris.

As bishop of the Ancient Diocese of Mirepoix Boyer also hounded the Philosophe school. In 1743, he plotted against Voltaire at the Académie française, when he ran for the seat vacated by Cardinal de Fleury.

In 1751, Boyer set the King's mind against the editors of the Encyclopédie and his machinations caused their articles to be monitored and censored. But he failed in his goal of suppressing the undertaking completely.

Voltaire, who also commented on other matters in which Boyer was involved, wrote:

...on est obligé d’avouer ici, avec toute la France, combien il est triste et honteux que cet homme si borné ait succédé aux Fénelon et aux Bossuet.
...I am obliged to confess here, with all of France, how sad it is and shameful that such a narrow-minded man has succeeded Fénelon and Bossuet.

But Boyer's eloquence was appreciated by some of his contemporaries, as Charles Le Beau recorded:

...il ne songe pas à charmer, mais à convertir; au lieu de lui applaudir, on se condamne; on l’oublie pour n’entendre que la voix de l’Évangile, dont il porte une forte teinture et dont il représente le naturel, le pathétique, l’insinuant, l’auguste et victorieuse simplicité
...he does not try to charm, but to convert, instead of applauding him, we should damn ourselves, in forgetting the word of the Gospel, with its natural, pathetic, and simple and august language.
