= Auvers-sur-Oise =

- Commune
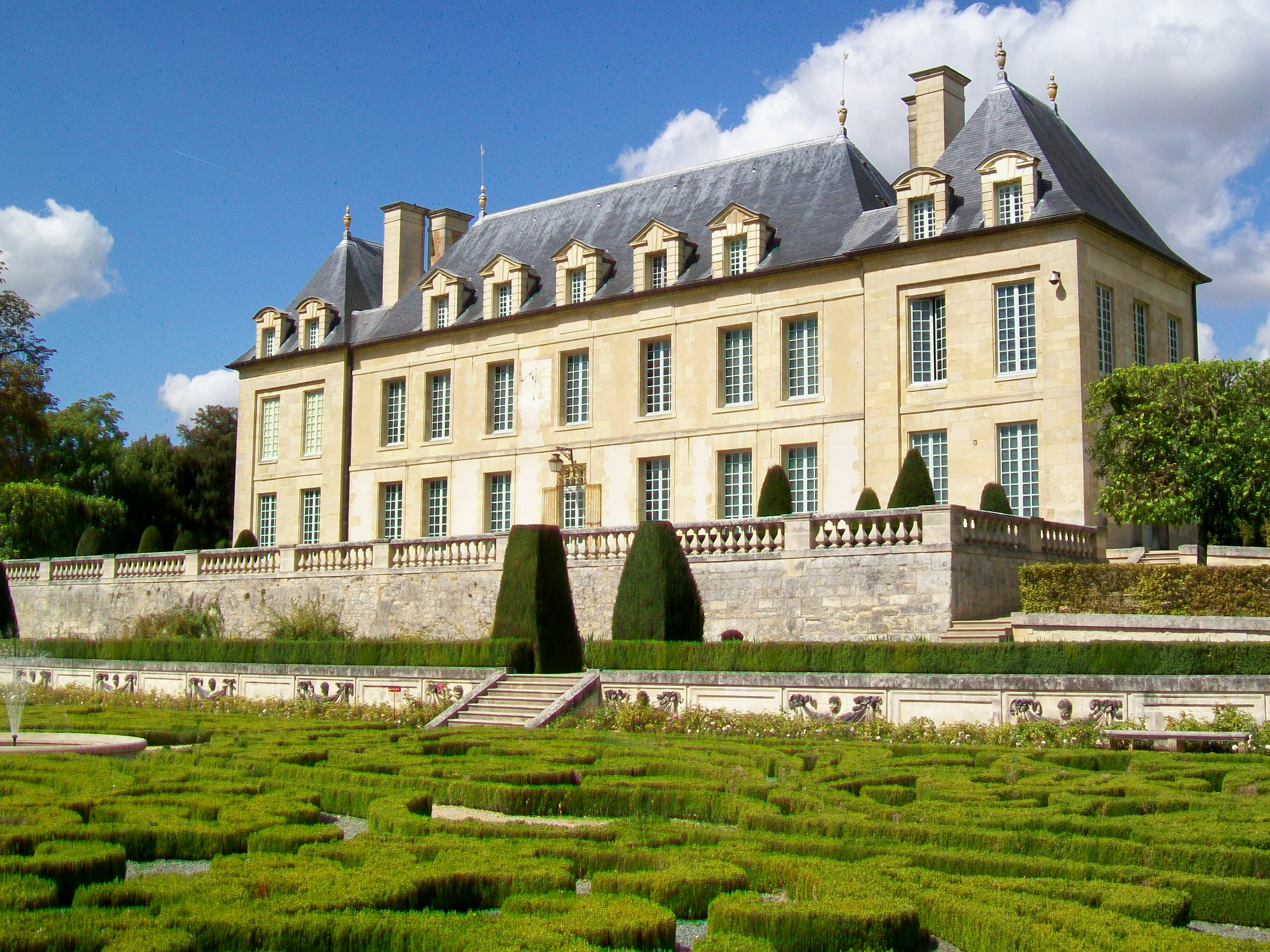
- The Château d'Auvers, also Château de Léry, built in the 17th–18th centuries

- Coat of arms
- Location of Auvers-sur-Oise
- Location within France Location within Île-de-France (region)
- Coordinates: 49°04′21″N 2°10′30″E
- Country: France
- Region: Île-de-France
- Department: Val-d'Oise
- Arrondissement: Pontoise
- Canton: Saint-Ouen-l'Aumône
- Intercommunality: CC Sausseron Impressionnistes

Government
  - Mayor (2020–2026): Isabelle Mézières
- Area^{1}: 12.69 km^{2} (4.90 sq mi)
- Highest elevation: 111 m (364 ft)
- Lowest elevation: 21 m (69 ft)
- Population (2023): 6,863
  - Density: 540.8/km^{2} (1,401/sq mi)
- Demonym: Auversois
- Time zone: UTC+01:00 (CET)
  - Summer (DST): UTC+02:00 (CEST)
- INSEE/Postal code: 95039 /95430
- Website: ville-auverssuroise.fr
- ^{1} French Land Register data, which excludes lakes, ponds, glaciers > 1 km^{2} (0.386 sq mi or 247 acres) and river estuaries.

Auvers-sur-Oise (French pronunciation: [ovɛr syr waz], lit. 'Auvers-on-Oise') is a commune in the department of Val-d'Oise, on the north-western outskirts of Paris, France. It is located 27.2 km (16.9 mi) from the centre of Paris. It is associated with several famous artists, the most prominent being Vincent van Gogh (1853–1890). This was the place where van Gogh died and where he and his brother, Theo, were buried.

== Geography ==
=== Location ===
Auvers is located on the right (west) bank of the river Oise. To the south, it is connected to Méry-sur-Oise by a bridge.

=== Localities ===
- Chaponval
- Cordeville (from Corbeville)
- Le Montcel (from Monsellus, small mountain)
- Les Vaissenots or Vessenots
- Le Valhermeil (from Val Hermer, name of the owner during the 12th century)
- Les Vallées

== History ==
During the 19th century, a number of painters lived and worked in Auvers-sur-Oise, including Paul Cézanne, Charles-François Daubigny, Camille Pissarro, Jean-Baptiste-Camille Corot, Norbert Goeneutte, and Vincent van Gogh. Daubigny's house is now a museum where one can see paintings by the artist, his family, and friends, such as Honoré Daumier, as well as rooms decorated in period style.

Charles Sprague Pearce (1851-1914) also died there.

Along the river walk from Auvers toward Pontoise are a number of views which featured in the paintings of Pissarro.

During the 20th century artists continued to frequent Auvers, including Henri Rousseau (Douanier Rousseau), Otto Freundlich and Pierre Daboval. The COBRA artist Corneille spent his last years in the village and is buried a few metres from Vincent van Gogh.

== Demographics ==
Historical population

Year	Pop.	±% p.a.
1793	1,754	—
1800	1,635	−1.00%
1806	1,708	+0.73%
1821	1,705	−0.01%
1831	1,806	+0.58%
1836	1,522	−3.36%
1841	1,530	+0.10%
1846	1,547	+0.22%
1851	1,553	+0.08%
1856	1,574	+0.27%
1861	1,648	+0.92%
1866	1,635	−0.16%
1872	1,720	+0.85%
1876	1,638	−1.21%
1881	1,713	+0.90%
1886	1,936	+2.48%
1891	2,063	+1.28%
1896	2,255	+1.80%
1901	2,402	+1.27%

Year	Pop.	±% p.a.
1906	2,544	+1.16%
1911	2,681	+1.05%
1921	2,961	+1.00%
1926	3,132	+1.13%
1931	3,240	+0.68%
1936	3,163	−0.48%
1946	3,345	+0.56%
1954	3,172	−0.66%
1962	3,772	+2.19%
1968	5,124	+5.24%
1975	5,808	+1.81%
1982	5,722	−0.21%
1990	6,129	+0.86%
1999	6,820	+1.19%
2007	6,917	+0.18%
2012	6,846	−0.21%
2017	6,908	+0.18%
2023	6,863	−0.11%

Source: EHESS and INSEE (1968–2023)

== Administration ==
On 1 August 1948, 17% of the territory of Auvers-sur-Oise was detached and became the commune of Butry-sur-Oise.

The current mayor is Isabelle Mézières. She was first elected in 2014, and was then re-elected in March 2020.

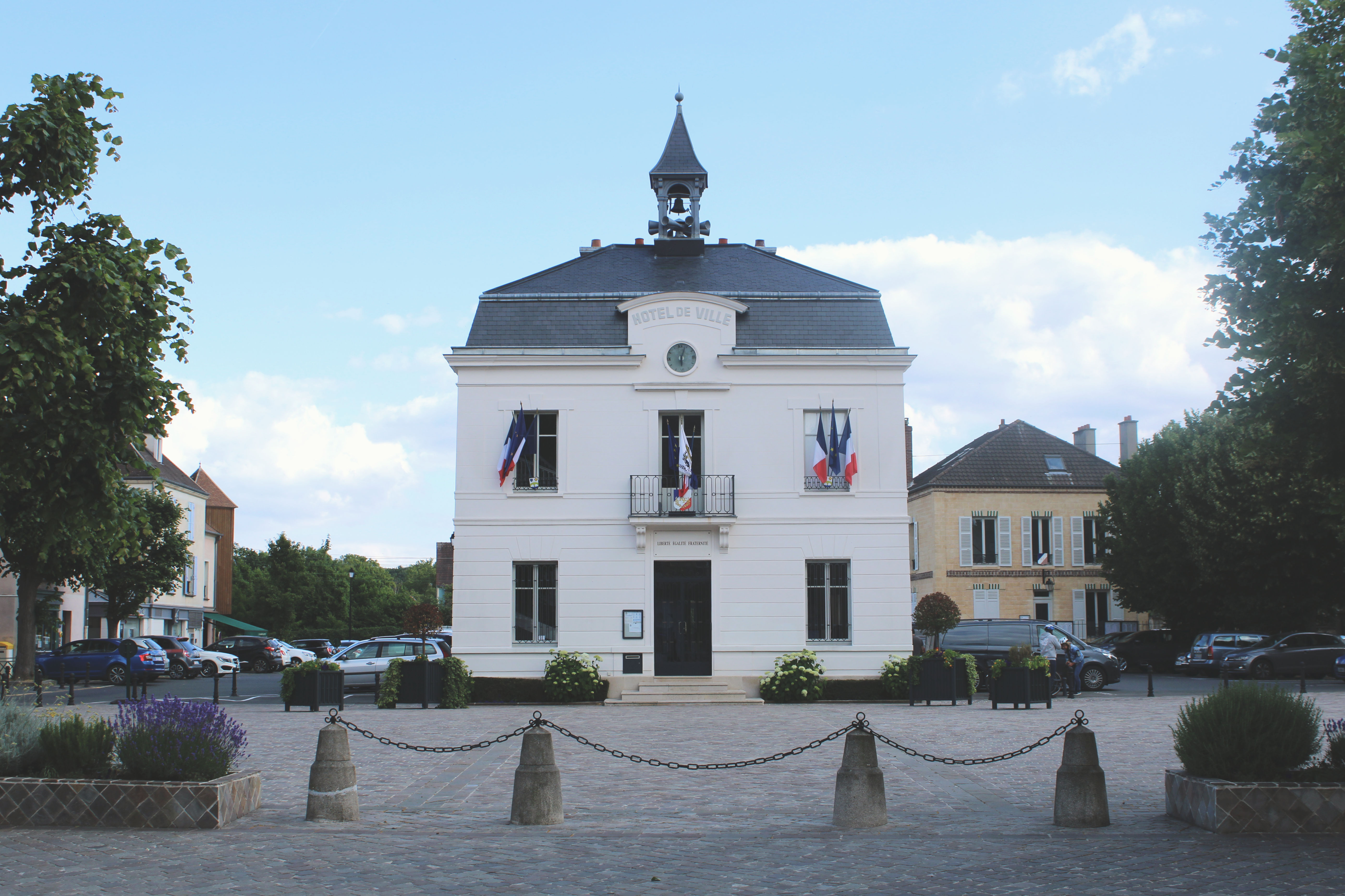
The town hall that was renovated in 2016

== Culture ==
=== Monuments ===
The creation of the church dates back to the 11th century. Louis VI le Gros (1081-1137) owned a manor in Auvers, where he often used to come to hunt. In 1131 his son, Philippe, who was the crown prince, accidentally fell from his horse and died. A chapel was erected for his burial place and this subsequently became the church Notre-Dame de l'Assomption: in 1915 it was listed as a historic monument. Together with the royal manor, they represent a major historical piece of the heritage of the city, where many famous painters came during the 19th century, such as Daubigny, Bourges, Bernard, Pearce, Bastard, Boggio or Wickenden.

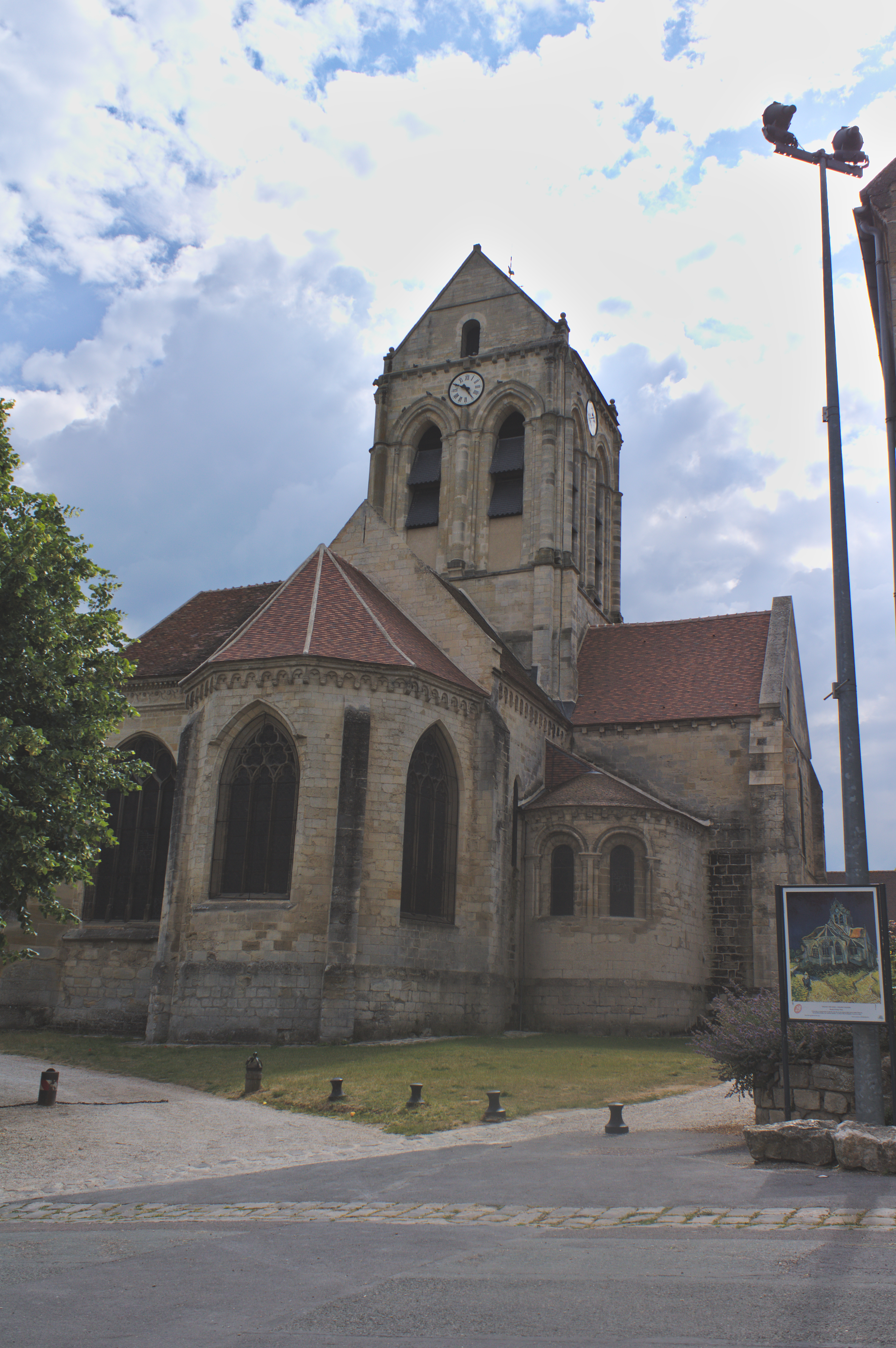
Church Notre-Dame de l'Assomption

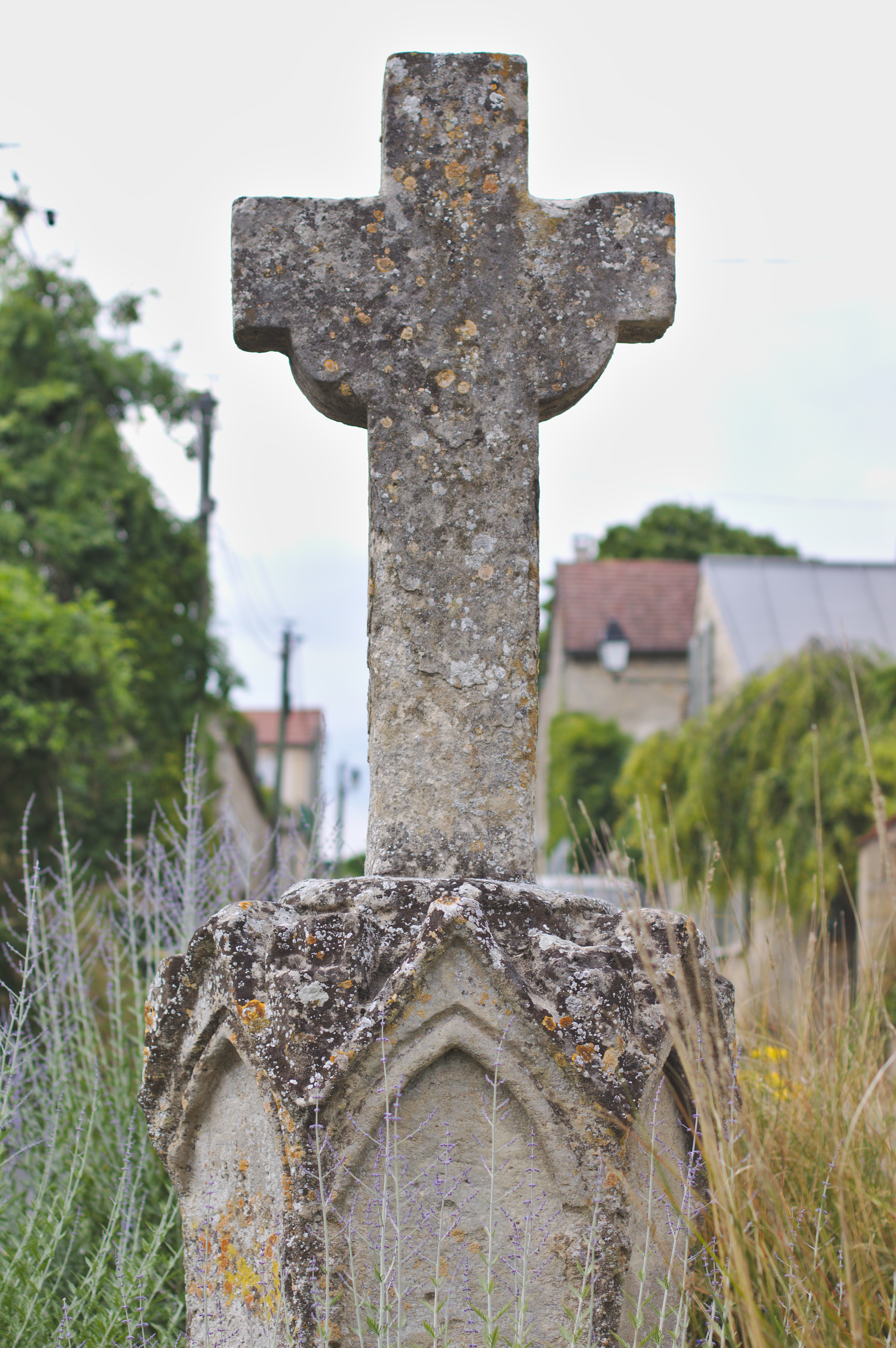
Croix du Montcel

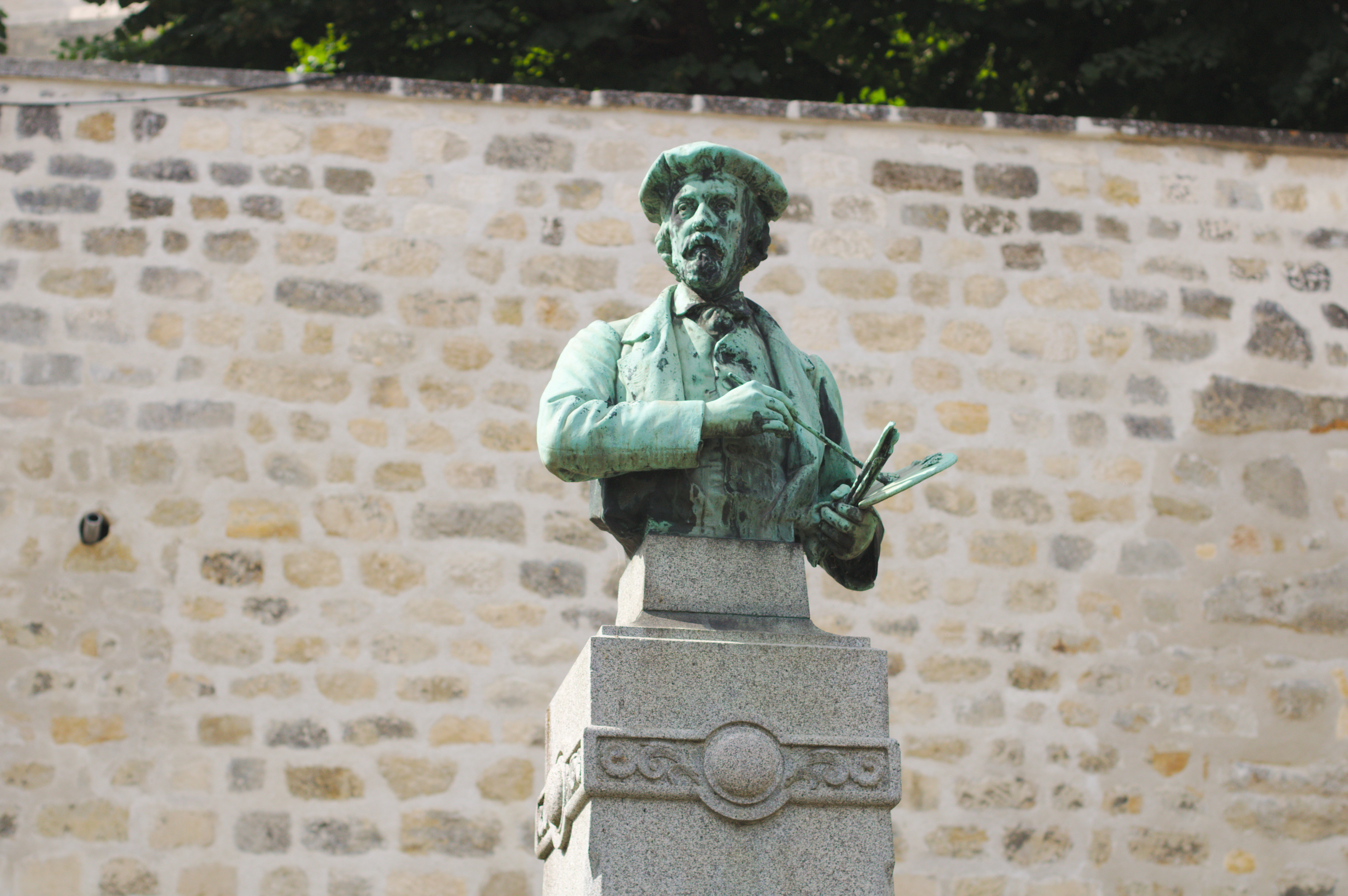
Statue of Charles-François Daubigny

=== Museums ===
- The musée Daubigny, located in the Colombières manor, was created in 1986 by the Tourist Office. The museum owns about a hundred works by Daubigny, such as paintings, drawings and engravings. The artist arrived in Auvers in the 1860s and stayed there for 18 years. He had a workshop boat called the "Botin", where he used to paint fluvial landscapes and sailed with his son, Karl. Then, many of his friends also came to Auvers to paint the landscapes. The museum mainly deals with pre-Impressionism. It has been a municipal museum since 2012.
- The musée de l'absinthe (Absinthe museum), located on the street rue Callé, deals with the history of the drink.

=== Van Gogh ===
Dr. Paul Gachet lived in Auvers-sur-Oise. He was acquainted with the avant-garde artists of the time. Through this connection, Vincent van Gogh moved to Auvers to be treated by him, though he considered the doctor to be in a worse state than himself. Gachet befriended Van Gogh and was the subject of two portraits, one of which, Portrait of Dr. Gachet, was sold at auction for over $80m (£48m) in 1990.

Van Gogh died from a self-inflicted gunshot wound to the chest. The room on the upper floor of the Auberge Ravoux where he died has been preserved, although no furniture remains. The Institut Van Gogh owns Auberge Ravoux, organizes the visits of Van Gogh's room and has opened a restaurant in the dining room. Auvers-sur-Oise is the final resting place of both Vincent and his brother Theo van Gogh, who died six months later.

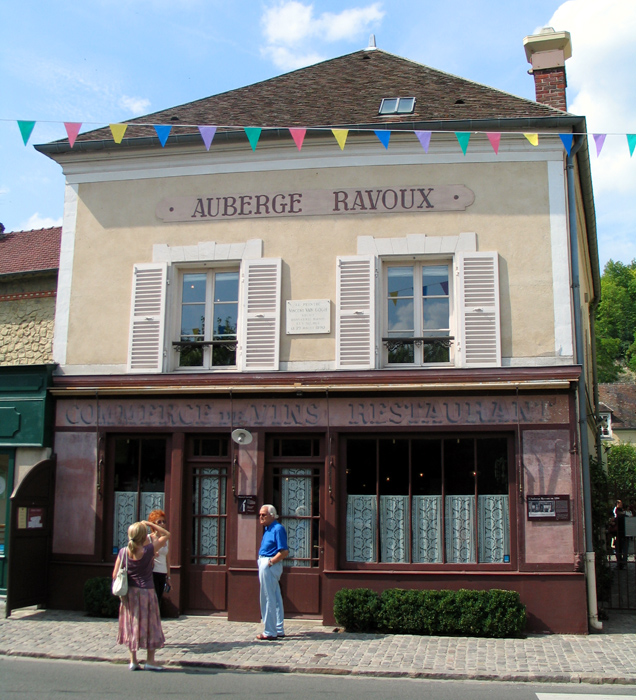
L'Auberge Ravoux, where Vincent van Gogh spent his final months and where he died. It is now a restaurant.

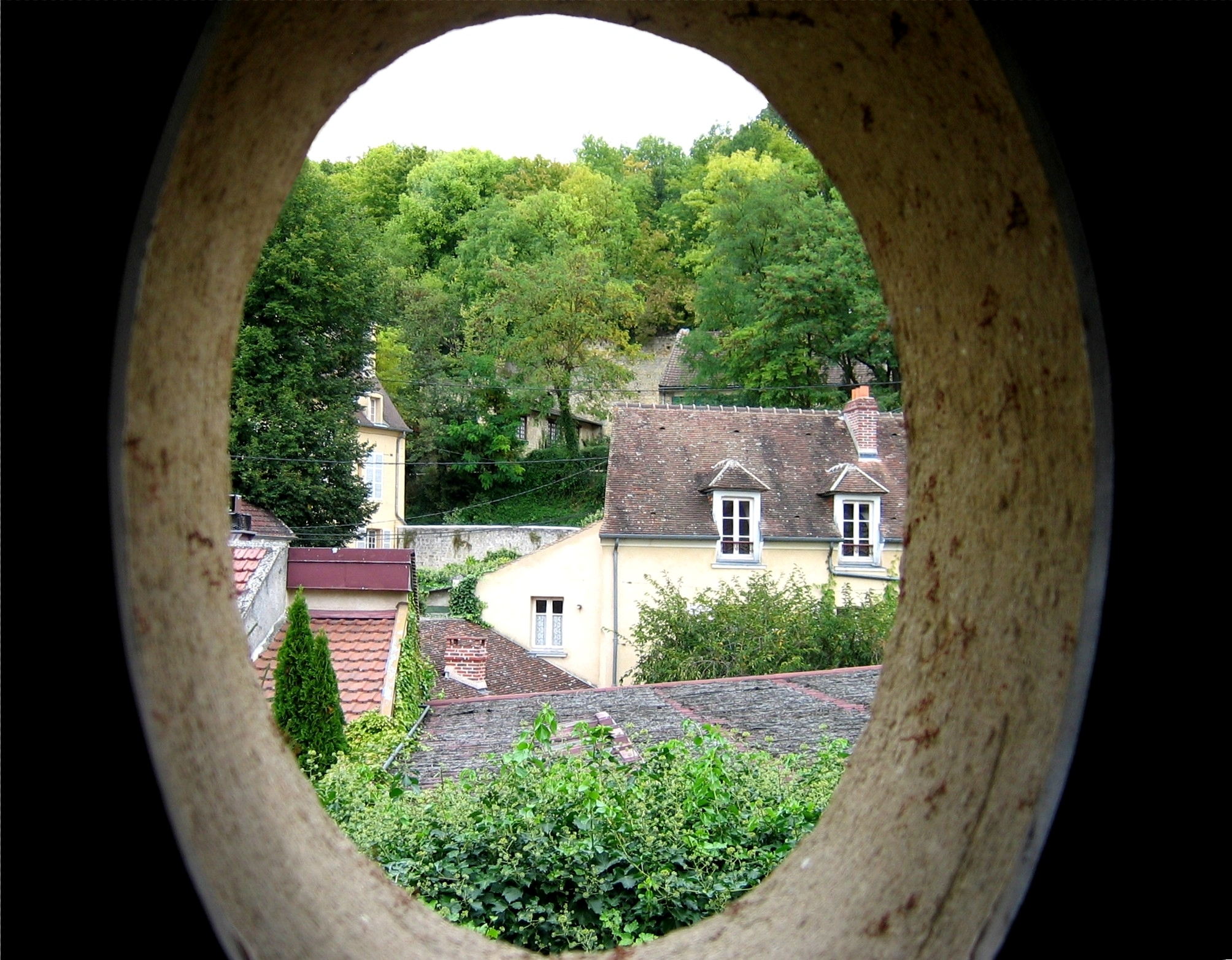
View from the staircase leading up to Van Gogh's room in L'Auberge Ravoux

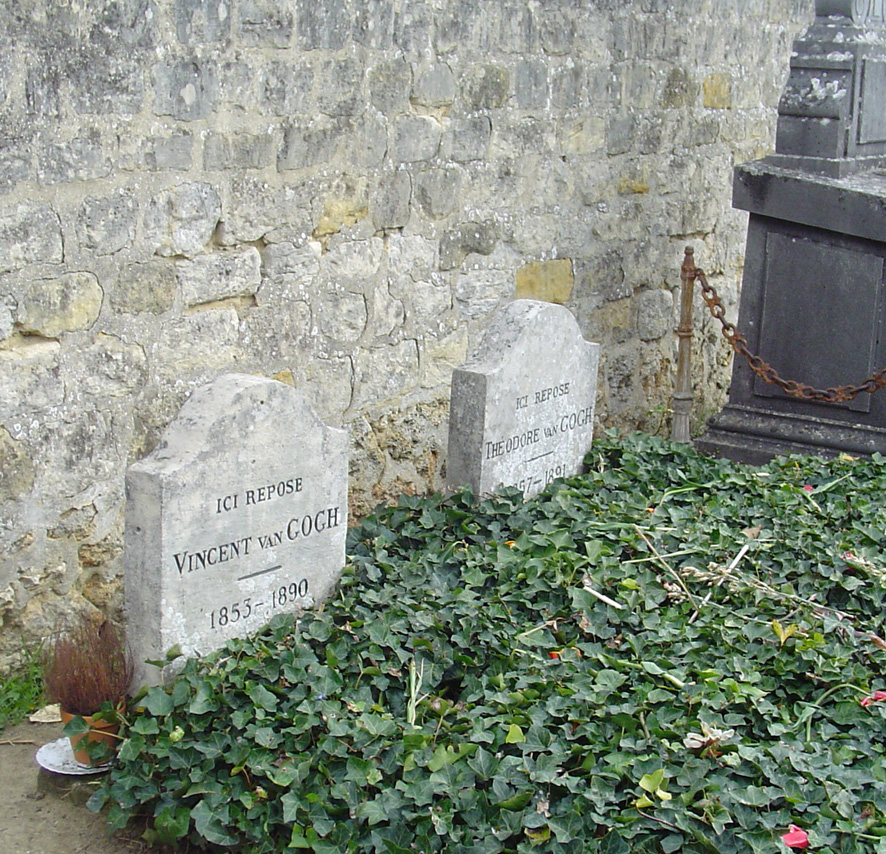
Vincent and Theo van Gogh's graves in Auvers-sur-Oise.
Auvers-sur-Oise in art

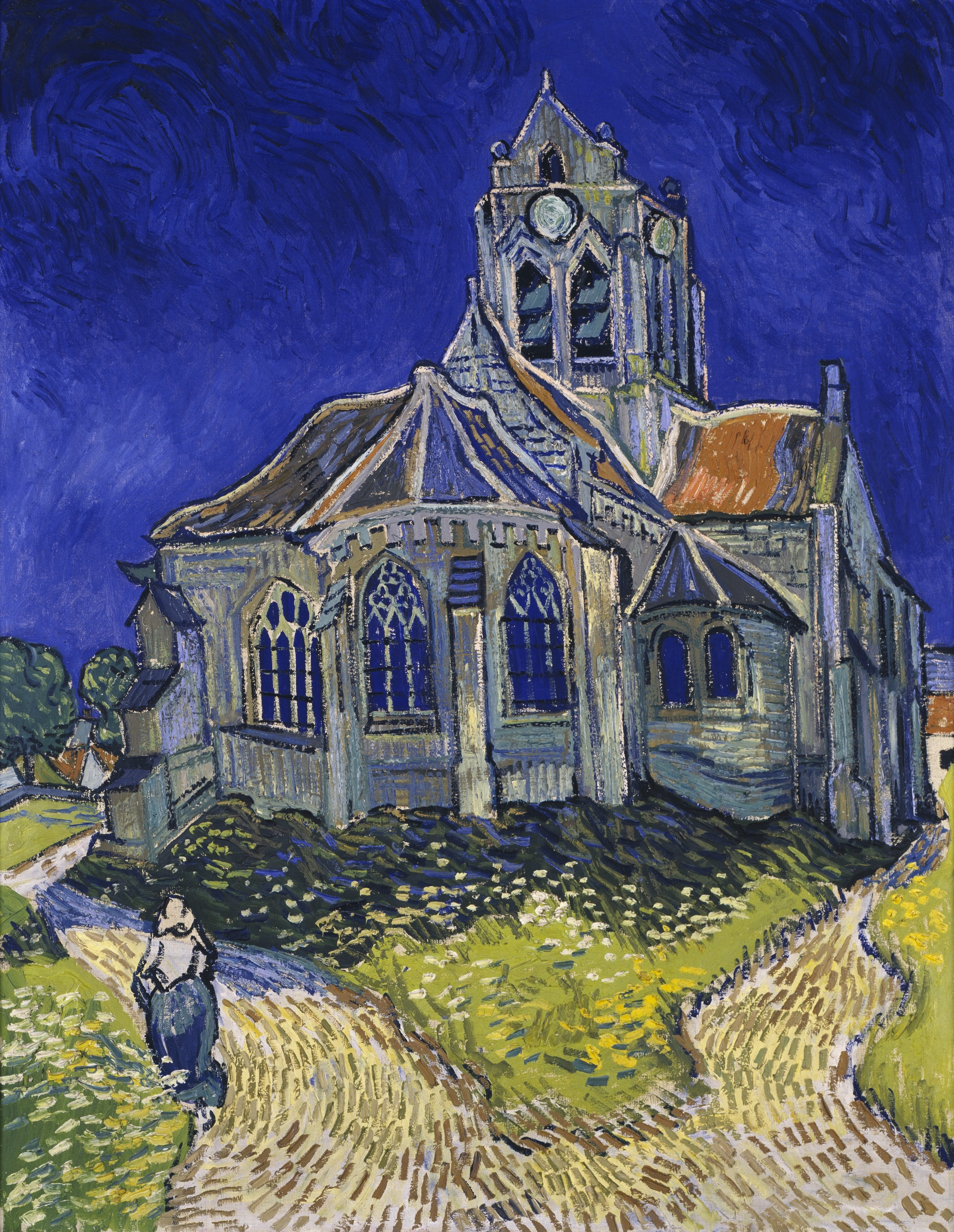
Church of Auvers-sur-Oise by Vincent van Gogh

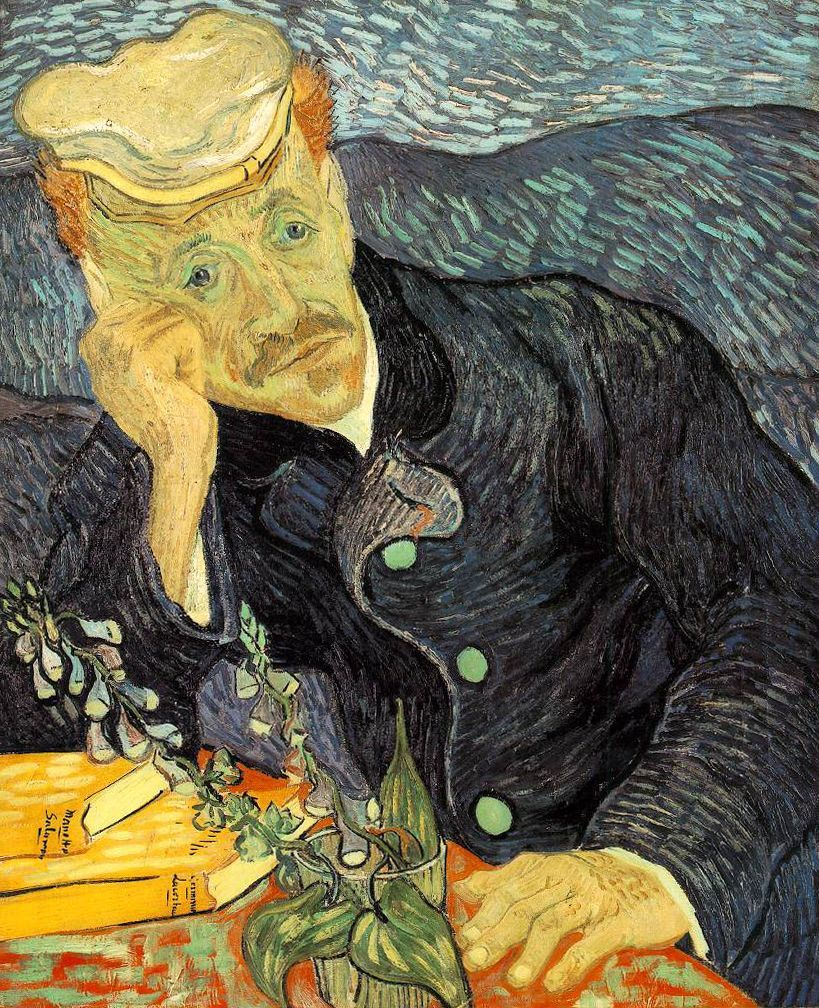
Portrait of Dr. Gachet by Vincent van Gogh

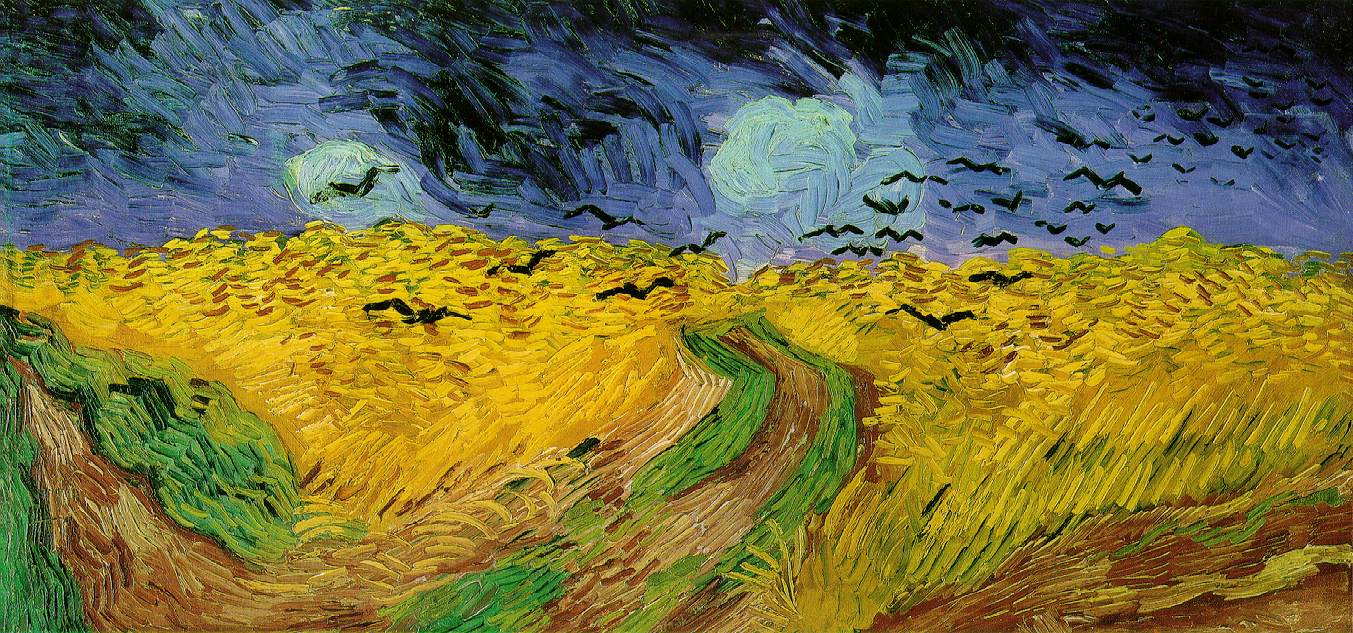
Wheat Field with Crows, one of Van Gogh's last paintings

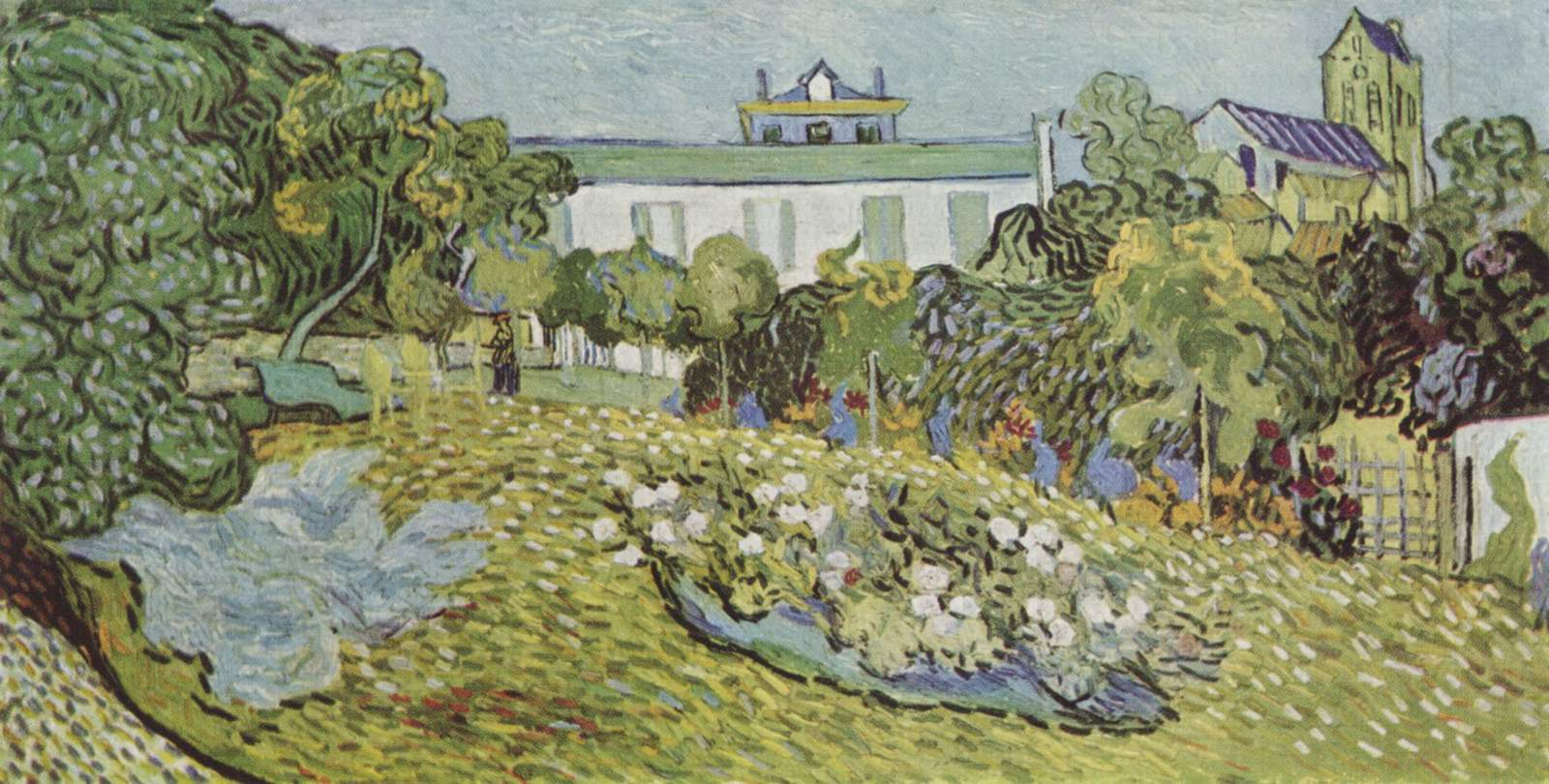
Daubigny's Garden, possibly Van Gogh's final painting

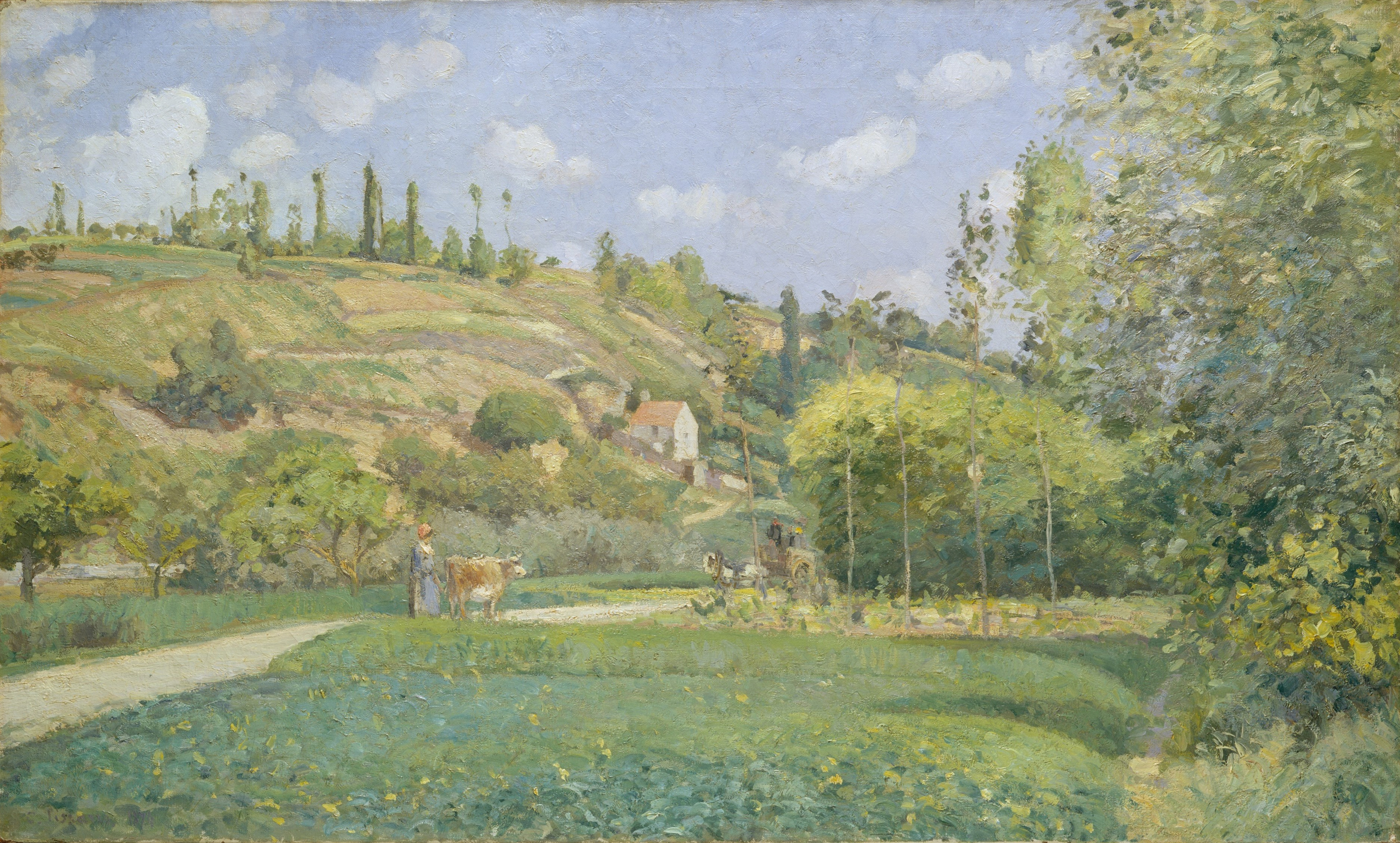
Camille Pissarro,
A Cowherd at Valhermeil, Auvers-sur-Oise, The Metropolitan Museum of Art

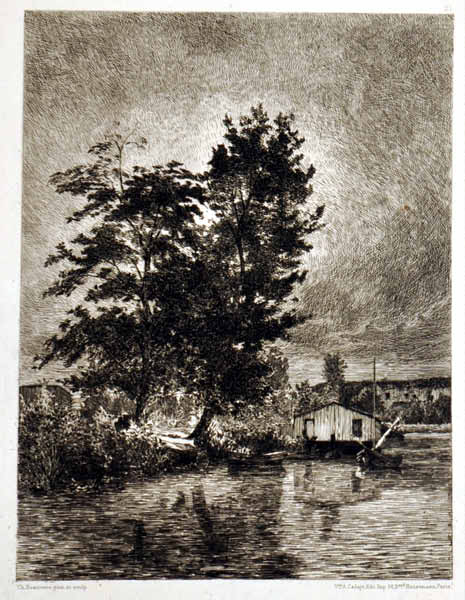
Charles Joseph Beauverie, Auvers-sur-Oise (Bâteau lavoir à Auvers), ca.1870

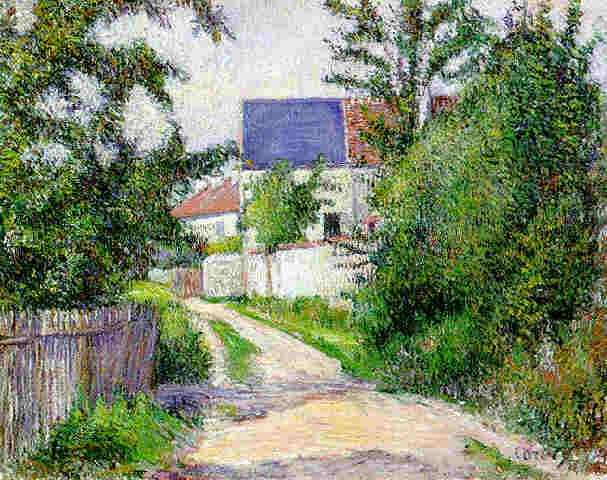
Frédéric Samuel Cordey, Ruelle à Auvers sur Oise, circa 1903

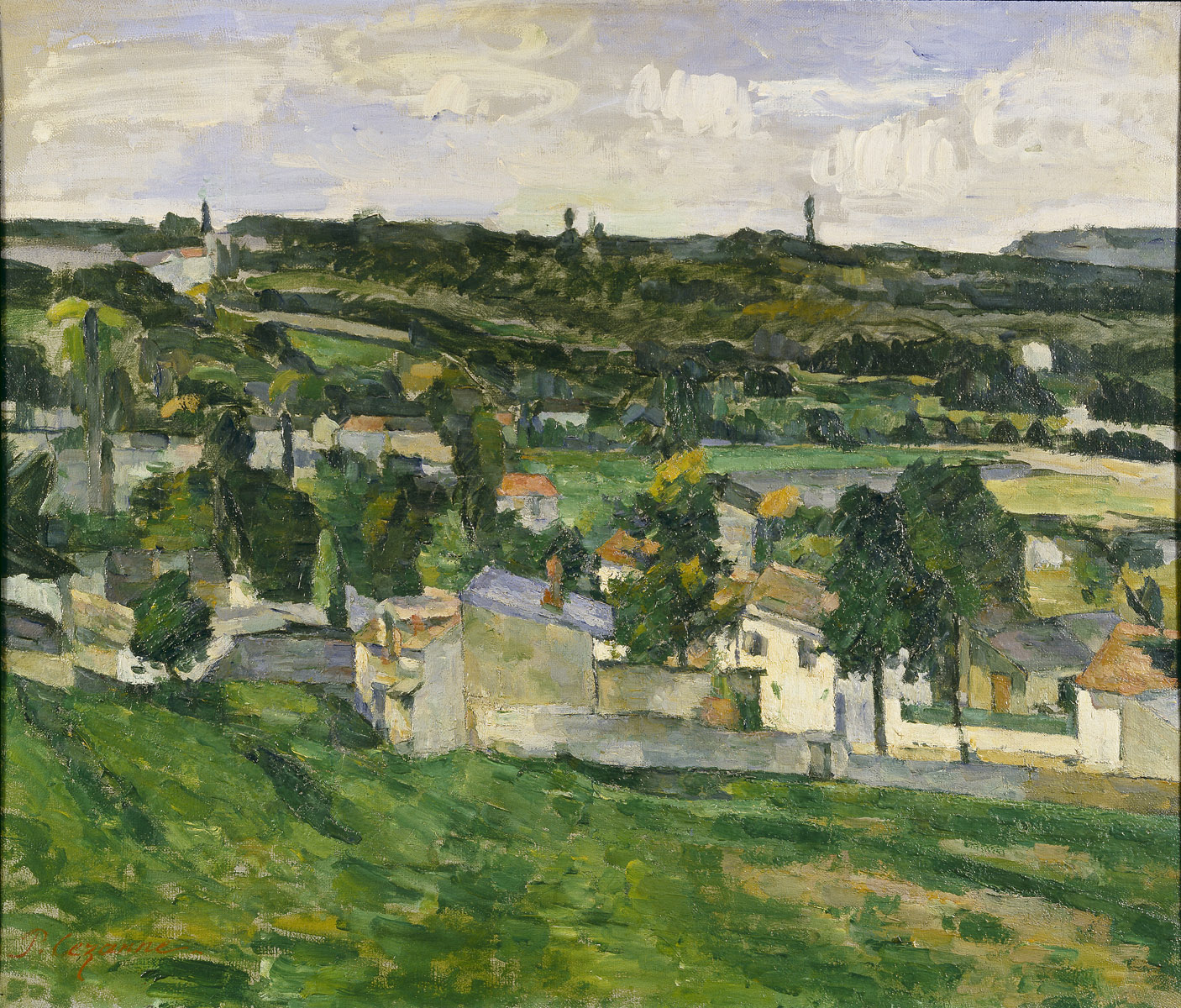
Paul Cézanne, View of Auvers-sur-Oise, 1873–75

== Transport ==
Auvers-sur-Oise is served by two stations on the Transilien Paris – Nord suburban rail line: Chaponval and Auvers-sur-Oise. The stations both lie on the line Pontoise-Creil. Between April and October, on Saturdays, Sundays and public holidays, direct trains go from Paris Gare du Nord to Auvers.

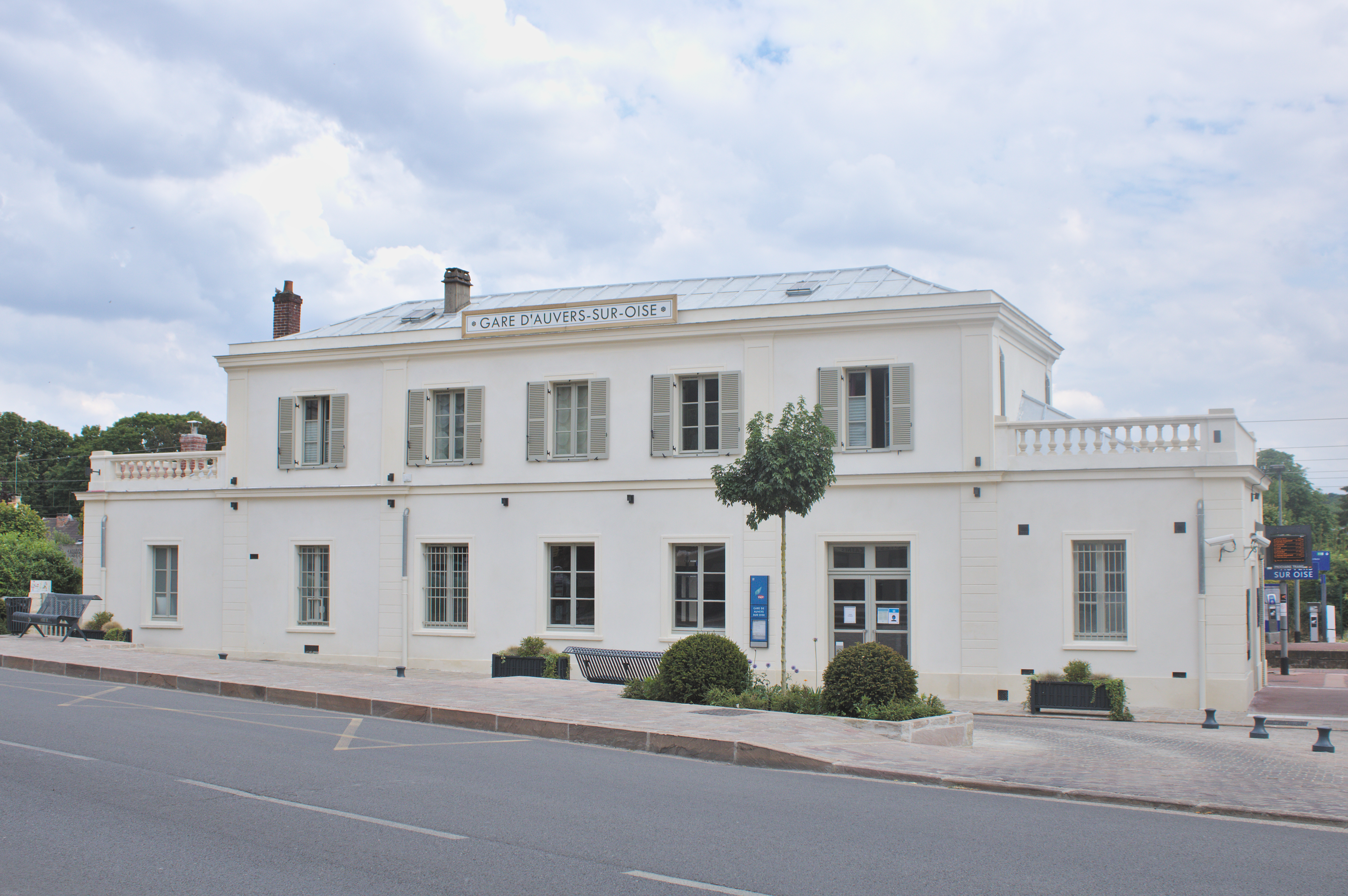
Train station of Auvers

Auvers is also served by two bus lines: 95 07 and 95 17.

== See also ==
- Communes of the Val-d'Oise department
- Auvers during the time of Vincent van Gogh
