= Pierre Daboval =

French artist (1918–2015)

Pierre Daboval (French pronunciation: [pjɛʁ dabɔval]; 3 July 1918 – 11 May 2015) was a French artist.

Daboval studied at the Académie de la Grande Chaumière, the Académie Julian and the Ecole des Beaux-Arts in Paris, 'plucking here and there from the teachings, until I had enough to make a bouquet'.

== Career ==
From 1949 to 1951 he lived and worked in Sweden, and then, on his return to France he lived successively in Auvers-sur-Oise and Saint-Rémy-de-Provence. The Musée Estrine in Saint-Rémy-de-Provence holds an important collection of his work.

He has exhibited in Switzerland, Belgium and France. In 1974 his works were shown at the Galérie Romanet, Paris, as part of an exhibition of erotic drawings ('Un peu d'erotisme'), alongside Hans Bellmer, Bernard Buffet, André Masson, Josep Puigmarti and Picasso.

In 1970 Daboval gave up painting to devote himself to drawing: 'I felt definitively that drawing, which I had always loved, was truly my vehicle: firstly the incisiveness of the pen, then the pencil, with its sensual inflections- these were to become my means of expression for these delicate things.... I feel there are infinite possibilities to exploit, despite the obvious restrictions of black and white. There are further subtleties to discover when entering this universe in which I feel at home and which I discover, little by little, to be under-exploited, perhaps because it still instils fear.' Between 1975 and 1990 Pierre Daboval explored what he called the 'fantastico-érotique'. 'He is able to synthesise the male and the female like no other artist I know of (except Picasso, Masson and Bellmer) but with a totally different personality.' From 1990 he mainly produced portraits, especially self-portraits.

From 1998 to his death in May 2015 he lived and worked in Mirepoix, Ariège.
