= Jean d'Espinay (bishop) =

Breton cleric and bishop

Jean d'Espinay (died 1503) was a Breton cleric and bishop.

== Life ==
Born in Brittany, he was the son of Richard, lord of Espinay and la Rivière, chamberlain to Francis II of Brittany, and his wife Béatrix of Montauban. He had two sisters and seven brothers, three of whom were also bishops - Robert, Jean le jeune and Guillaume, bishops of Nantes, Mirepoix (and later Nantes) and Léon respectively. Another brother, André, was a cardinal, whilst their sister François d'Espinay became abbess of Saint-Georges de Rennes in 1485.

His uncle Robert d'Espinay resigned as treasurer of Rennes on 26 March 1482 and died on 17 April that year. After the resignation Jean took on the role, exchanging the parish of Saint-Grégoire for that of Domagne. On 9 July 1477 he won a five-year prorogation of his dispensation from being ordained a priest. He was made bishop of Mirepoix by pope Innocent VIII in 1495 and was translated to the diocese of Nantes in 1493, succeeding his brother Robert.

== See also ==
- Catholic Church in France
