= André d'Espinay =

French Roman Catholic bishop and cardinal

André d'Espinay (died 1500) (called the Cardinal of Bordeaux or the Cardinal of Lyon) was a French Roman Catholic bishop and cardinal.

== Biography ==
André d'Espinay was born in Champeaux, Ille-et-Vilaine, ca. 1451, the son of Richard d'Espinay (chamberlain to Francis II of Brittany) and Beatrix de Montauban. He had two sisters and seven brothers, four of whom were also bishops – ⁣Robert, Jean senior, Jean junior and Guillaume. Their sister François d'Espinay became abbess of Saint-Georges de Rennes in 1485.

He became a licentiate in canon law. After completing his education, he became a protonotary apostolic. He also became a canon of the cathedral chapter of Bordeaux Cathedral. He was next the Prior of the Priory of Saint-Martin-des-Champs. On April 10, 1479, he was elected Archbishop of Bordeaux; his election was confirmed by Pope Sixtus IV on April 28, 1479. He took possession of the see in 1482 and occupied it until his death.

Following the death of Louis XI in 1483, he traveled to Brittany to serve Charles VIII. He attended the Assembly of the French clergy in 1485. Under Charles VIII, he served as governor of Paris. On October 1, 1488, he was named Archbishop of Lyon, occupying that see until his death, while also retaining the metropolitan see of Bordeaux.

At the request of Charles VIII, Pope Innocent VIII made Espinay a cardinal priest in the consistory of March 9, 1489. He received the red hat and the titular church of San Martino ai Monti on March 23, 1489.

He returned to the Kingdom of France in 1490, becoming commendatory abbot of Holy Cross Abbey, Bordeaux, an office he held until 1499.

He did not participate in the papal conclave of 1492 that elected Pope Alexander VI. On November 1, 1492, the new pope named him papal legate to Charles VIII of France. As such, the cardinal accompanied Charles VIII on his campaigns during the Italian War of 1494–1498, and was close to the king during the 1495 Battle of Fornovo.

Returning to France, he served as apostolic administrator of the metropolitan see of Aix from October 1499 to May 1500. He was also a benefactor of the Celestines.

He died in the Château de la Tournelle in Paris on November 10, 1500. He is buried in the Church of the Celestines in Paris.
