= Robert d'Espinay =

Breton cleric and bishop

Robert d'Espinay (died August 1493) was a Breton cleric and bishop.

== Life ==
He was the son of Richard, lord of Espinay and la Rivière, chamberlain to Francis II of Brittany, and his wife Béatrix of Montauban. He had two sisters and seven brothers, three of whom were also bishops - Jean, Jean le jeune and Guillaume, bishops of Nantes, Mirepoix (and later Nantes) and Léon respectively. Another brother, André, was a cardinal, whilst their sister François d'Espinay became abbess of Saint-Georges de Rennes in 1485.

He was cantor of Rennes when on 12 August 1482 he was made bishop of Lescar. In 1488 he was translated to the diocese of Nantes - this was pushed through by Pope Innocent VIII pressuring Louis XI, despite opposition from its canonical chapter and duchess Anne of Brittany. He was succeeded as bishop of Nantes by his brother Jean the Elder.

== See also ==
- Catholic Church in France
