= Captive market =

Concept in economics

A captive market is a market where the potential consumers face a severely limited number of competitive suppliers; their only choices are to purchase what is available or to make no purchase at all.

Consumers can become captive through switching costs, even when competing products are available. These costs can include replacing incompatible equipment, learning to use a different product, or giving up benefits tied to repeat purchases. Switching costs give suppliers market power over existing customers, while the prospect of repeat business can encourage competition to attract new customers through low introductory prices.

Economic models also distinguish captive consumers, who consider purchasing from only one seller, from consumers who compare offers from several sellers. Both groups can be present in the same market.

== Examples ==
Cinema concession stands provide an example: once inside a theatre, patrons form a captive market for refreshments such as popcorn, soft drinks and sweets.

Airport shops and restaurants serve passengers waiting for flights. Reporting on Philadelphia International Airport in 2016, Billy Penn described passengers on layovers and those arriving early for departures as a captive market for retailers.

During the 2020 NBA Bubble, Jimmy Butler sold coffee for US$20 a cup. Sports Illustrated later described his customers as a captive clientele.

Campus food purchasing has also been studied in this context. A study of 951 undergraduates at a public university in New England identified high campus food prices and limited transport to grocery shops as barriers faced by students experiencing food insecurity.

Students buying assigned textbooks have been described as a captive market because they cannot choose which titles they are required to use.

In March 2026, the Australian Competition and Consumer Commission (ACCC) reported that the Qantas Group, including Jetstar, provided over two-thirds of Australian domestic passenger services and, with Virgin Australia, accounted for over 95 per cent of the market. Many regional and remote routes had only one airline group. Some low-demand routes operate under exclusive rights awarded by government tender to support service viability.

Frequent-flyer programs, including Qantas Frequent Flyer, can also influence customers’ choice of airline. The ACCC’s 2019 review identified switching costs associated with progress towards rewards and with status benefits, although membership is non-exclusive. Its 2025 aviation report recalled an earlier assessment that frequent-flyer programs did not appear to create a significant barrier to entry.

Captive audiences also offer opportunities for advertising revenue. In 2014, travel journalist David Flynn described Qantas’s expansion of advertising aboard aircraft and in its domestic lounges as a way of earning revenue from captive travellers.

In US freight transport, customers who consider themselves dependent on a single railway are known as "captive shippers". The Congressional Research Service notes that these customers typically ship bulky goods that cannot economically be transported by truck and lack viable access to transport by barge.

In academic publishing, individual journals contain material that is not interchangeable with that of other journals. In 2012, University of Pittsburgh library director Rush Miller described commercial journal publishing, including Elsevier, as a captive market because libraries needing a particular journal had to accept its price or forgo access.

Telephone services in US jails and prisons have been described as a captive market because institutions arrange exclusive contracts with providers, leaving prisoners and their families unable to choose a competing telephone company.

A historical example is Murphy and Company in nineteenth-century Lincoln, New Mexico. The business paid local farmers and ranchers in credit redeemable at its store, creating a captive market for its goods.

In a study of English and German professional football, André Bühler discussed the description of committed supporters as captive consumers: their loyalty to a club makes them unwilling to switch merely because another club offers cheaper tickets or merchandise.

== See also ==
- Captive audience
- Right to repair
