= Najee Dorsey =

American visual artist (born 1973)

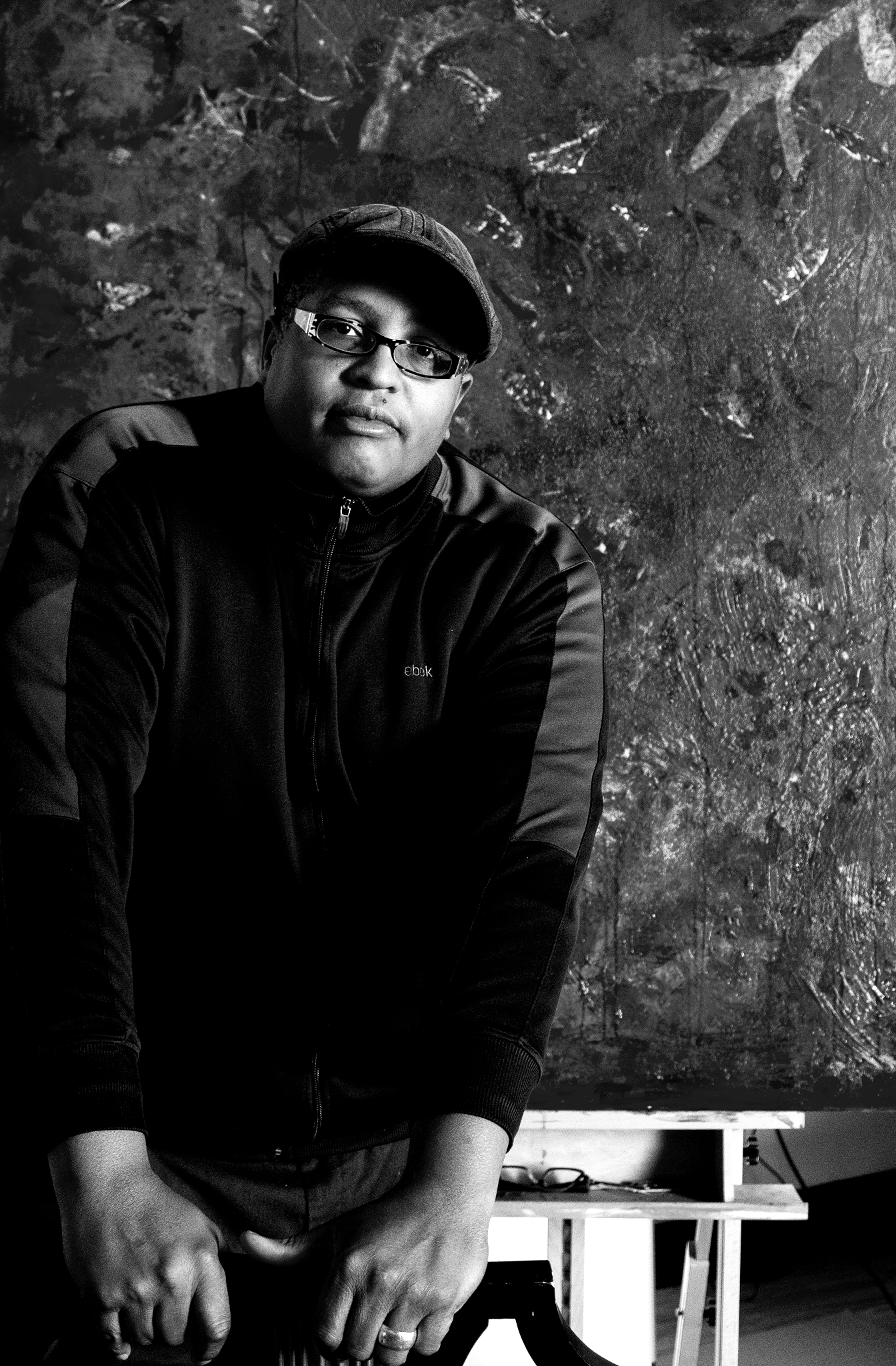
- Born: January 26, 1973 (age 53); Blytheville, Arkansas
- Known for: Visual Art; Founder/CEO Black Art in America
- Spouse: Seteria Dorsey
- Website: najeedorsey.com blackartinamerica.com/

Najee Dorsey (born 1973) is a contemporary American visual artist known for using mixed-media, collage, paint and photographic works that depict Southern African American experience and culture.

== Biography ==
Najee Dorsey (born January 26, 1973) is an American artist and entrepreneur from Blytheville, Arkansas. He began creating art at a young age and is largely self-taught. Dorsey's work is included in various art institutions and private collections across the United States. In 2010, Dorsey founded Black Art in America (BAIA), a media platform that provides exposure to black art and artists, fostering connections between artists, collectors and art enthusiasts.

== Career ==
Dorsey's art reflects his experiences growing up in the South, particularly his childhood in Mississippi County, Arkansas. His work encompasses a range of media, including painting, photography, digital art and mixed media collages. Dorsey's collages frequently highlight themes related to Southern African American culture, including the Blues, African American history and socioeconomic conditions of the South.

His 2021 series, The Poor People's Campaign, is titled in tribute to Martin Luther King's program for economic justice. One piece from the series, Ice Cream Melting, was displayed as a billboard in the Boxtown neighborhood of Memphis, Tennessee. Boxtown, a historic neighborhood founded by formerly enslaved people, was central to a legal dispute over the construction of an oil pipeline from 2019 to 2021. The series addresses themes of Afrofuturism and environmental racism in poor communities in the South. Dorsey commented on the work, stating, “If you live in an urban environment, you’re pretty close to a factory, maybe a refinery, perhaps a landfill. This work speaks to how we live in plain sight of a lot of these corporate wastelands.”

== Projects and initiatives ==
In 2022, Dorsey and his wife, Seteria Dorsey, also a visual artist and his business partner, opened the Black Art in America Gallery and Sculpture Garden in the Atlanta metropolitan area. The gallery, located on the site of a former church, features works by notable artists such as Faith Ringgold, Kerry James Marshall, Alfred Conteh, Delita Martin, Elizabeth Catlett, Samella Lewis, Romare Bearden, and Louis Delsarte.

The BAIA Foundation, established by Dorsey, is dedicated to "documenting, preserving, and promoting the contributions of the African American arts community." The foundation has supported projects that archive the work of local artists and has facilitated connections between African American artists and students at primary schools and historically Black colleges and universities (HBCUs).

== Exhibitions ==
Dorsey has exhibited his work at many galleries and institutions, including:

- Museum of Art-DeLand, DeLand, Florida (2022)
- Anika Dawkins Gallery, Atlanta, Georgia (2021)
- Ohr-O'Keefe Museum of Art, Biloxi, Mississippi (2021)
- Griots Gallery, Miami, Florida (2020)
- PRIZM Art Fair, Miami Art Week (2019)
- Columbus Liberty Theatre, Columbus, Georgia (2019)
- Mildred L. Terry Library, Columbus, Georgia (2019)
- Stonecrest Library, Lithonia, Georgia, The Art of Najee Dorsey: Environmental Injustice, Visions of a Futuristic Black South (2019)
- Pennsylvania Academy of the Fine Arts, Philadelphia, Pennsylvania, R.D.’s Backroom
- University of Arkansas Library, Fayetteville, Arkansas, Remixed: Something Ole, Sum Nu Roux (2016);
- The American Jazz Museum, Kansas City, Missouri, Jazz Then and Now (2015)
- Syracuse University, Community Folk Art Center, Resistance (2015)
- The Houston Museum of African American Culture, Houston, Texas, Leaving Mississippi: Reflections on Heroes and Folklore (2015)
- The Columbus Museum, Columbus, Georgia, Leaving Mississippi: Reflections on Heroes and Folklore (2014)
- The Charles H. Wright Museum of African American History, Detroit, Michigan, Visions of the 44th Collection (2012)

== Selected works ==
- This My Baldwin (2020)
- Return to Eden #1 (2019)
- Shine the Light (2020)
- B-4-Rosa-Here I Stand (2014)
- Baby Boy (2019)
- Bethlehem Steele (2015)
- Captive Audience (2019)
- Harriet’s Daughter (2018)
