= Mirepoix Cathedral =

- Cathedral of Saint Maurice of Mirepoix
- Cathédrale Saint-Maurice de Mirepoix
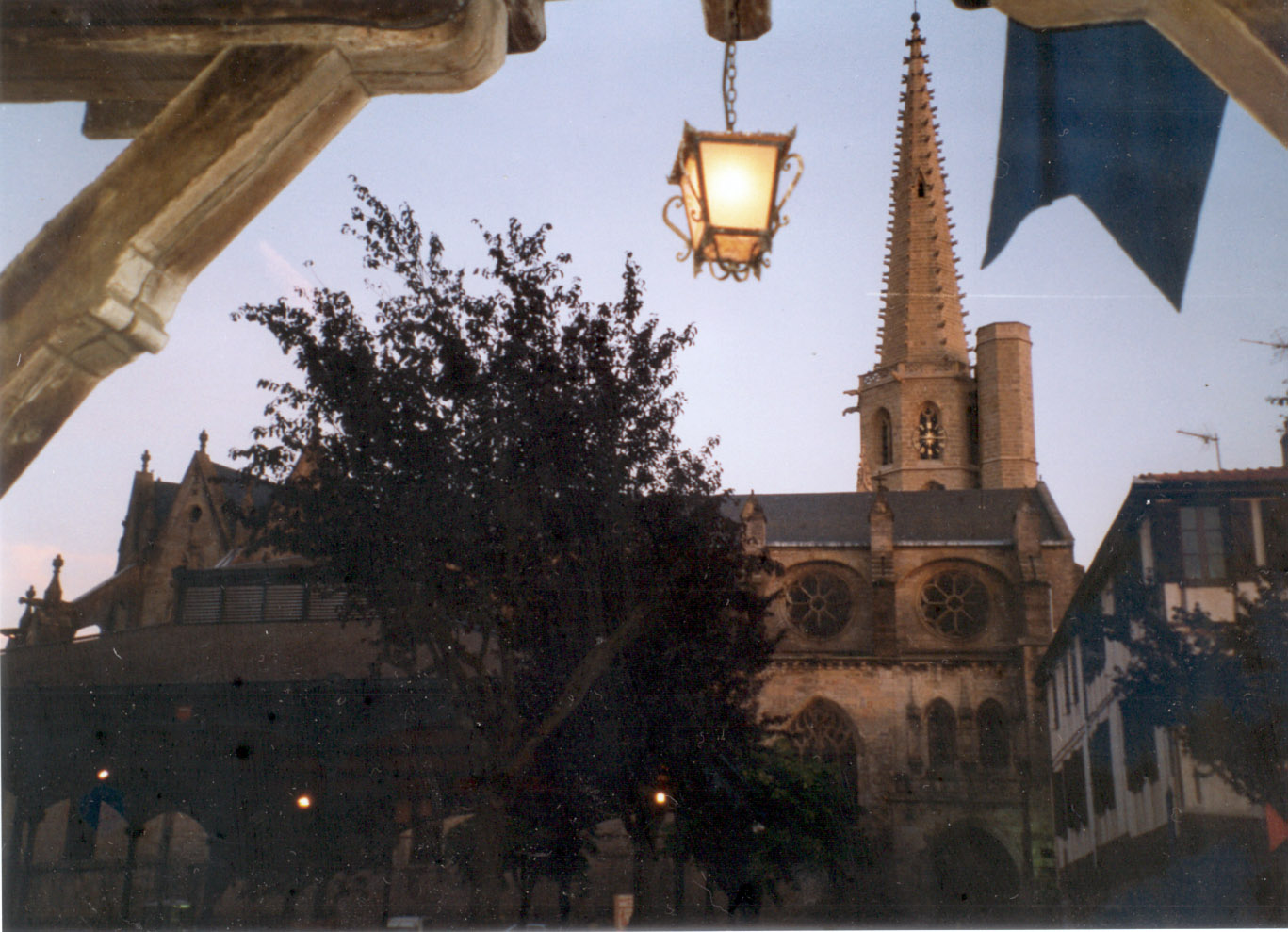
- Mirepoix Cathedral
- Location: Mirepoix, Ariège
- Country: France
- Denomination: Roman Catholic
- Tradition: Roman

History
- Status: Active
- Dedication: Saint Maurice

Architecture
- Functional status: Parish church
- Architectural type: Basilica
- Style: Gothic
- Groundbreaking: 6 May 1298
- Completed: 19th century

Administration
- Archdiocese: Toulouse
- Diocese: Pamiers, Couserans, and Mirepoix
- Parish: Mirepoix

Clergy
- Priest: David Naït-Saad

Monument historique
- Official name: Ancienne cathédrale Saint-Maurice, actuellement église paroissiale
- Type: classé
- Designated: 22 March 1907
- Reference no.: PA00093826

Mirepoix Cathedral (French: Cathédrale Saint-Maurice de Mirepoix) is a Roman Catholic church located in the southwestern town of Mirepoix, Ariège, France.

The foundation stone was laid by Jean de Lévis on 6 May 1298. Construction continued, with interruptions, over the next six centuries. The cathedral was restored in 1858 and 1859 by Prosper Mérimée, and Eugène Viollet-le-Duc.

The cathedral has the second widest Gothic arch in Europe, after that of the Girona Cathedral in Catalonia, Spain.

It was formerly the seat of the Bishop of Mirepoix. The diocese, created in 1317, was abolished under the Civil Constitution of the Clergy in 1790, and confirmed under the Concordat of 1801 and the territory divided between the Diocese of Carcassonne and the Archdiocese of Toulouse.
