= Frédéric Samuel Cordey =

French painter (1854–1911)

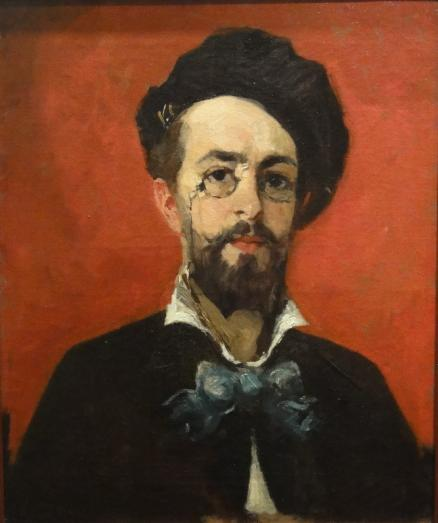
- Portrait of Cordey by Norbert Goeneutte
- Born: 1854; Paris, France
- Died: 1911 (aged 56–57); Éragny, France
- Education: Student of Isidore Pils and Gustave Boulanger
- Known for: Painting
- Movement: Impressionism

Frédéric Samuel Cordey (1854–1911) was a French landscape painter who was a part of the Impressionist movement. He was a close friend of Auguste Renoir, and had a personal fortune that allowed him to work according to his taste, regardless of the publicity and support provided by art dealers.

== Life and work ==
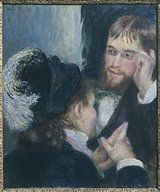
Conversation with the painter (Cordey), painting by Auguste Renoir

A student of Isidore Pils and Gustave Boulanger, Cordey was part of a group that revolted against the teachings of his teachers with his friend Pierre Franc Lamy. Cordey quickly abandoned traditional painting to follow the path of the Impressionists and exhibited four paintings Rue à Montmartre ("Street in Montmartre"), Le Pont des Saints-Pères ("Bridge at Saints-Pères"), le Séchoir ("The Dryer", Chantilly), Pêcheur ("Fisherman", sketch) with them in 1877.

In 1881, Gustave Caillebotte informed Camille Pissarro that he wanted Cordey to exhibit with the Impressionists, but that year Cordey was in Algiers with André Lhote. Cordey exhibited his work at the Salon des indépendants in 1884.

Cordey was close to Renoir and was one of his most loyal companions. Cordey appeared in several paintings by the master painter, for example, the Bal du moulin de la galette ("Dance at Le moulin de la Galette") and La Conversation ("The Conversation"). Auguste Renoir's son, Jean, reported a theory of Cordey's which appealed a lot to his father: "Painters, like gymnasts, must keep in shape. They must keep a clear sight, precise movements, and good legs to go meet the landscape."

Cordey was a great admirer of the musician François Cabaner. To help him as he was poor and dying, Cordey (like other artists) gave one of his works, to be auctioned and raise funds. Paul Cézanne mentioned the list of the offered works in a letter to his friend Émile Zola. He also admired Nina de Callias and Léon Dierx, whose portraits he drew. Cordey's painting Léon Dierx, prince des poètes ("Léon Dierx, prince of poets") was purchased by Georges Viau in 1899.

Attentive to landscapes, he stayed close to Camille Pissarro in Neuville-sur-Oise and Éragny. He participated in the Salon d'automne from its inception in 1903 until 1908. He was named a member of the Salon in 1904, where he exhibited six of his paintings.

Cordey exhibited ten paintings at the Salon in 1906, including six of the banks of the Oise. He exhibited rarely, however, the art critics Adolphe Tabarant, Paul Alexis, and Gustave Geffroy were very eulogistic in the preface to the retrospective exhibition of Cordey in 1913-1914 at Choiseul Gallery. Adolphe Thalasso praised Cordey's landscapes from Eragny in a February 1914 report in L'Art et les Artistes ("Art and Artists").

== Gallery ==
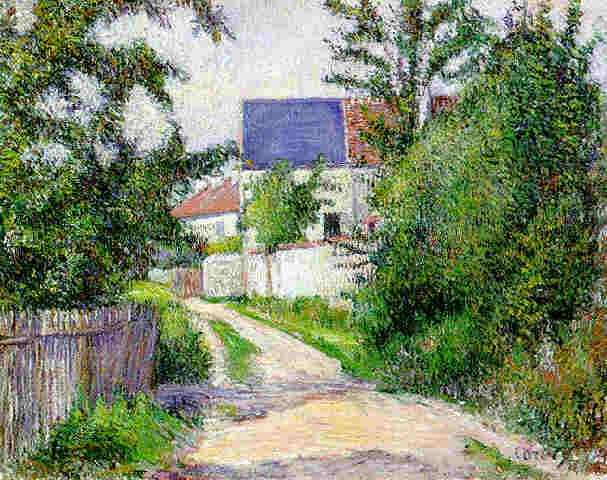
Ruelle à Auvers-sur-Oise ("Lane in Auvers-sur-Oise"), c. 1903

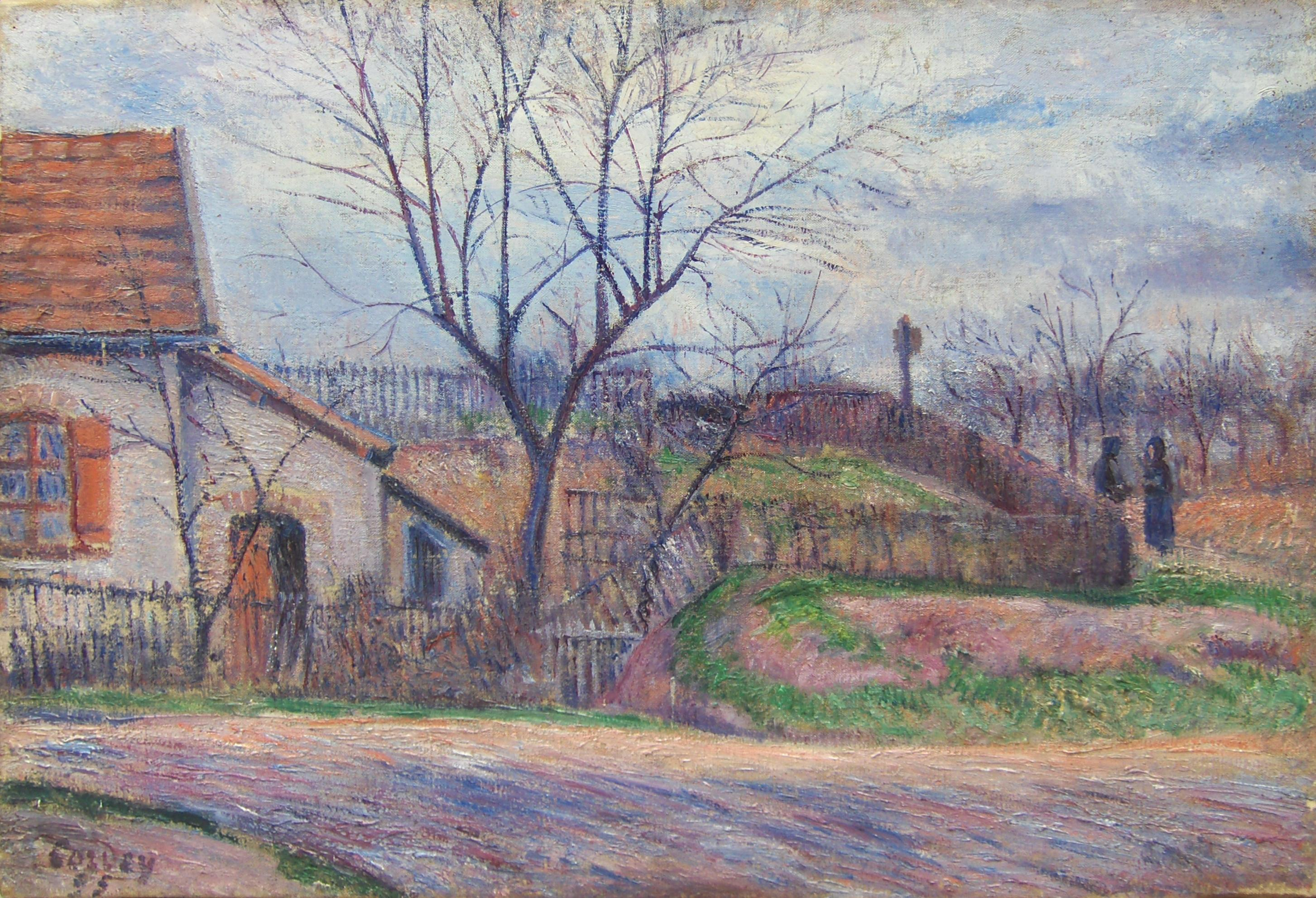
La Chaumiere, ca. 1900

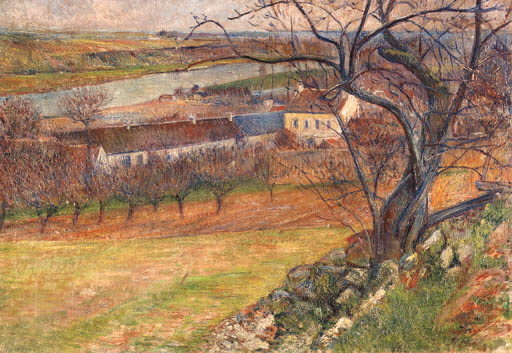
Village by a stream, ca. 1900

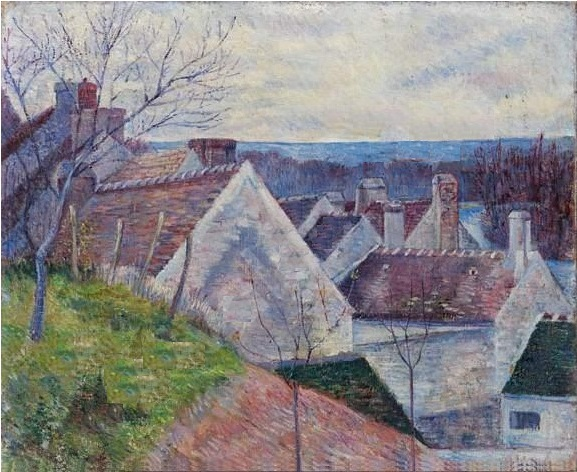
Les toits, le matin ("The roofs, the morning"), 1892

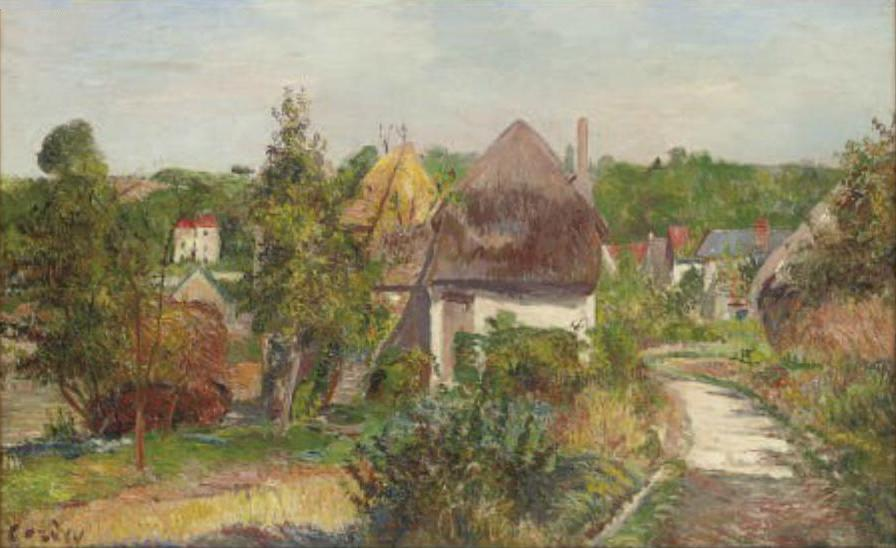
A path through the village, ca. 1900

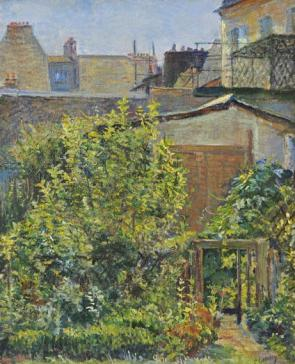
Jardin dans une banlieue à Paris (Garden in a Paris suburb)

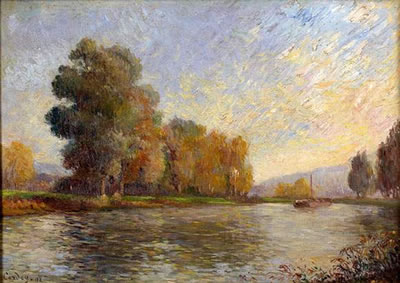
River, ca. 1900

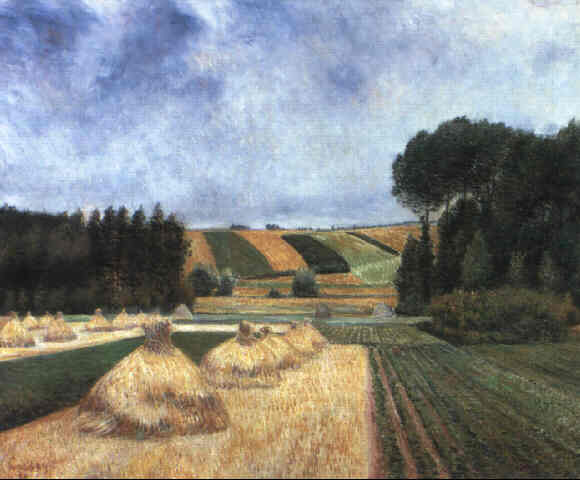
Paysage aux meules ("Landscape with sheaves"), 1895

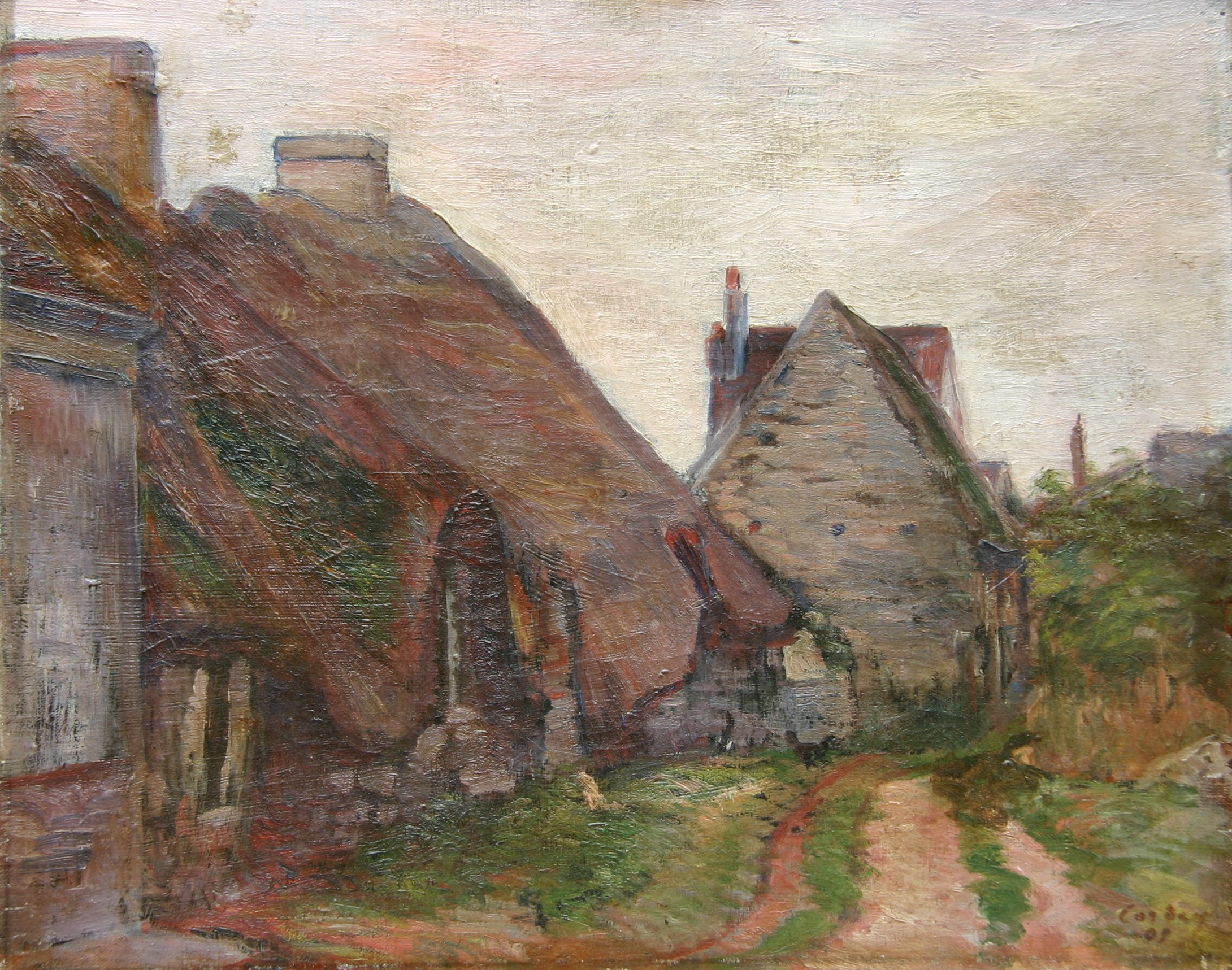
Les Chaumes du gré à Auvers sur Oise ("Shrubs in Auvers-sur-Oise"), ca. 1890

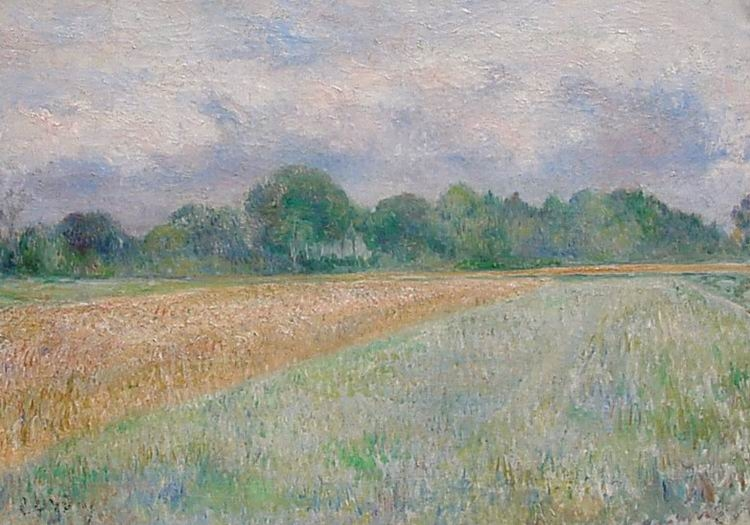
A l'orée du bois ("At the edge of the woods"), 1901

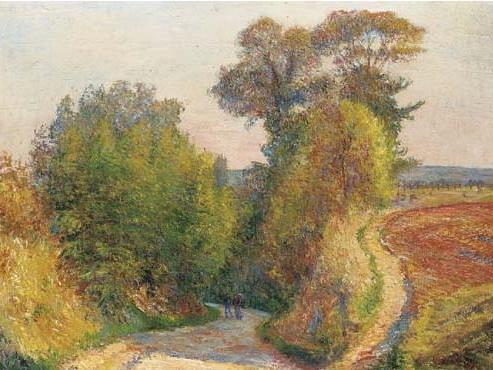
Un paysage au soleil couchant ("A landscape at sunset"), ca. 1900

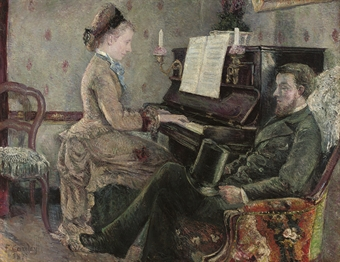
Auditoire captivé ("A captive audience"), 1877

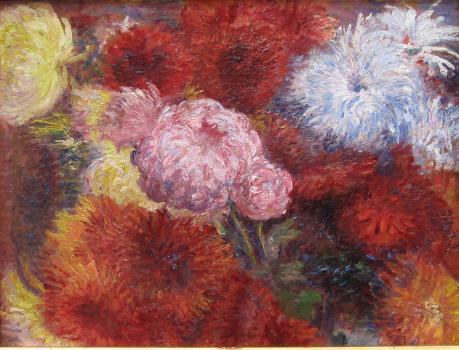
Flowers, c. 1880

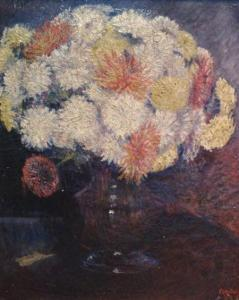
Chrysanthèmes blanches dans un vase ("White chrysanthemums in a vase"), 1898

== Selected works ==
- 1877 – Auditoire captivé ("A captive audience")
- 1879 – Madame Cordey faisant de la tapisserie ("Mrs Cordey making a tapestry")
- 1879 – Jeune femme lisant ("Young woman reading")
- 1881 – Femme orientale au sofa ("Eastern woman on a sofa")
- 1889 – Autoportrait ("Self-portrait")
- 1892 – Les toits, le matin ("The roof, the morning")
- 1892 – La basse-cour ("The barnyard")
- 1893 – Vue d'Eragny-Neuville ("View of Eragny-Neuville")
- 1894 – Passage à niveau ("Crossing")
- 1894 – Le Garde Barrière ("The guard barrier")
- 1895 – Bord de rivière ("Riverside")
- 1895 – Paysage aux meules ("Landscape with wheels")
- 1896 – Bord de rivière ("Riverside")
- 1898 – Paysage avec l'église ("Landscape with church")
- 1898 – Chrysanthèmes blanches dans un vase ("White chrysanthemums in a vase")
- 1898 – Le chemin vers le château ("The road to the castle")
- 1900 – Cerisiers en fleurs aux environs d'Auvers sur Oise ("Cherry blossoms around Auvers-sur-Oise")
- 1900 – Les Péniches ("The houseboat")
- 1901 – A l'orée du bois ("At the edge of the woods")
- 1903 – Bord de l'Oise ("Bank of the Oise")
- 1903 – Bord de l'Oise en automne ("Oise waterfront in autumn")
- 1903 – Peupliers au bord de la rivière ("Poplars on the banks of the river")
- 1905 – Femme pensive ("Pensive woman")
- 1906 – Plat de Pêches ("Plate of peaches")
- 1906 – Les environs de Pontoise ("The area around Pontoise")
- Ruelle à Auvers-sur-Oise ("Lane in Auvers-sur-Oise")
- Les Chaumes du gré à Auvers sur Oise ("Shrubs in Auvers-sur-Oise")

== Exhibitions ==
- 1877 – Exhibited a single painting with the Impressionists
- 1887 – Salon des indépendants
- 1903 – Salon d'Automne
- 1904 – Salon d'Automne
- 1905 – Salon d'Automne
- 1906 – Salon d'Automne: Plat de pêches ("Plate of peaches") and nine other canvases, of which six depict the banks of the Oise
- 1907 – Salon d'Automne
- 1908 – dernière exposition au Salon d'Automne

== Gallery exhibitions ==
- Choiseul Gallery, Frederick Samuel Cordey, Winter 1913-1914

== Honors ==
1904 – Associate of the Salon d'Automne
