= Mirepoix, Ariège =

Commune in Occitanie, France

Mirepoix
- Commune
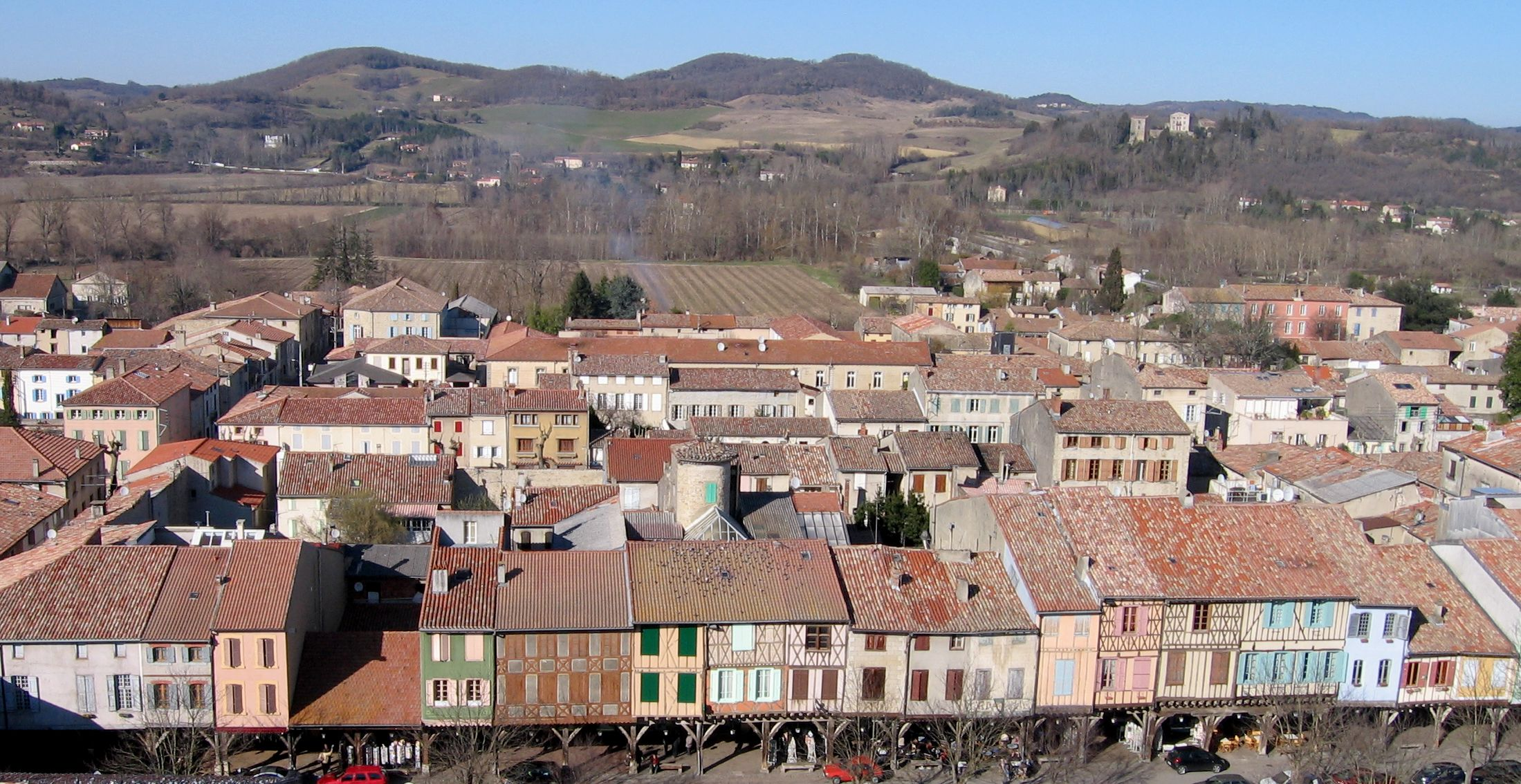
- A general view of Mirepoix

- Coat of arms
- Location of Mirepoix
- Location within France Location within Occitanie
- Coordinates: 43°05′23″N 1°52′28″E
- Country: France
- Region: Occitania
- Department: Ariège
- Arrondissement: Pamiers
- Canton: Mirepoix
- Intercommunality: Pays de Mirepoix

Government
  - Mayor (2020–2026): Xavier Caux
- Area^{1}: 47.28 km^{2} (18.25 sq mi)
- Elevation: 308 m (1,010 ft)
- Highest elevation: 462 m (1,516 ft)
- Lowest elevation: 276 m (906 ft)
- Population (2023): 3,172
  - Density: 67.09/km^{2} (173.8/sq mi)
- Time zone: UTC+01:00 (CET)
  - Summer (DST): UTC+02:00 (CEST)
- INSEE/Postal code: 09194 /09500
- ^{1} French Land Register data, which excludes lakes, ponds, glaciers > 1 km^{2} (0.386 sq mi or 247 acres) and river estuaries.

Mirepoix (French pronunciation: [miʁpwa]; Occitan: Mirapeis, supposedly from mira peis, meaning see the fish) is a commune in the Ariège department in southwestern France.

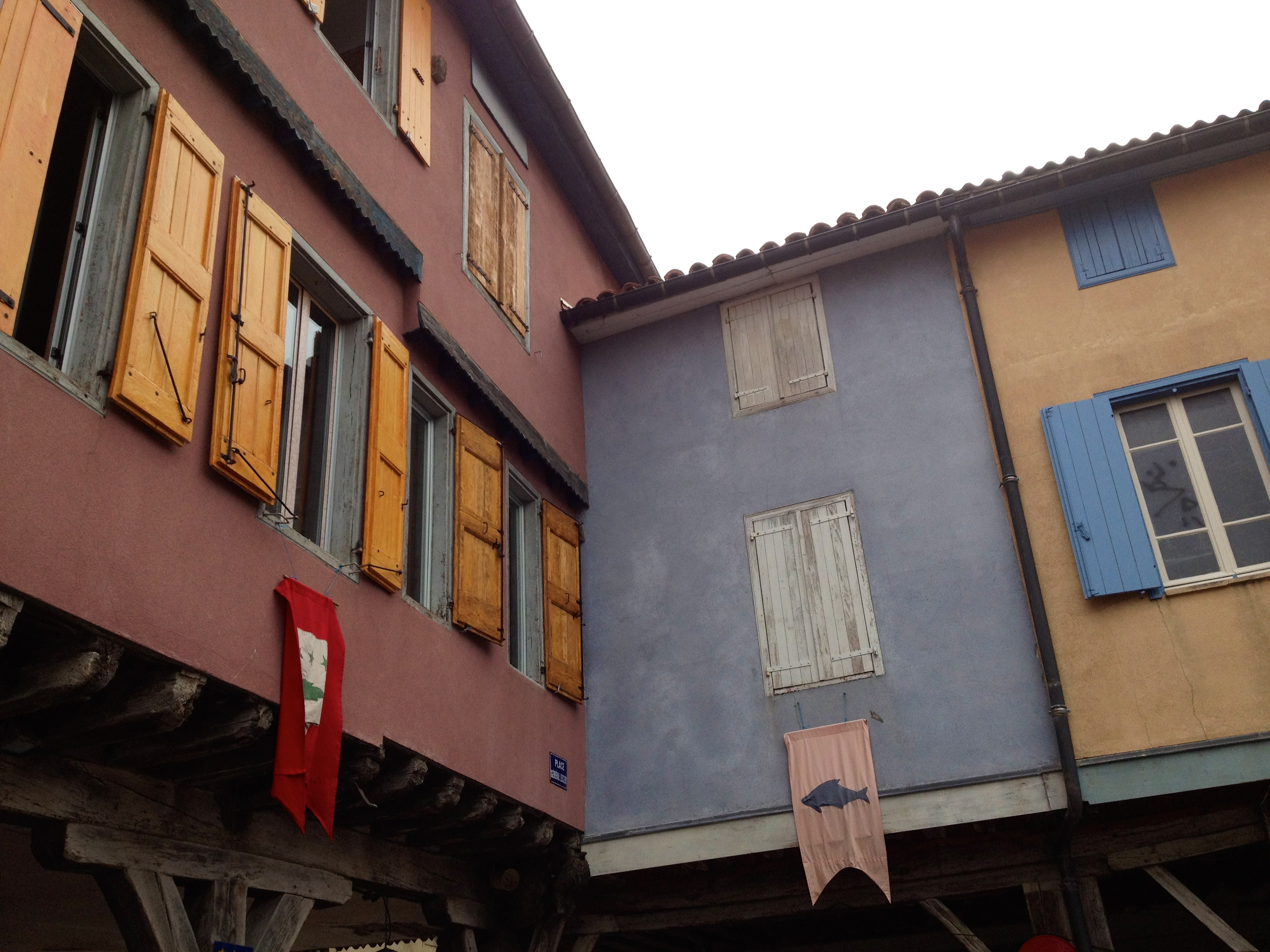
13th-century façades in Mirepoix.

== Geography ==
Mirepoix is situated in the Hers valley between Carcassonne and Pamiers.

== History ==
Mirepoix was captured in 1209 by Simon V de Montfort and given to one of his lieutenants, Guy de Lévis. The town, originally on the right bank of the Hers-Vif, was destroyed by a violent flood in 1289. It was rebuilt by Jean de Lévis in 1290, on an elevated natural terrace on the other side of the river. The layout of the town center has not changed since the 13th century.

Mirepoix Cathedral (Cathédrale Saint-Maurice de Mirepoix), a former Roman Catholic cathedral and national monument of France, was the seat of a bishopric until 1801.

== Politics and administration ==
List of successive mayors of Mirepoix
In office		Name	Party	Capacity	Ref.
1895	1908	Philippe Roubichou	Republican		
1908	1928	Paul Porcher	Radical		
1931	1932	Louis Planel	Republican		
1942	1944	Antoine de Lévis-Mirepoix			
1959	1981	Gilbert Faure	SFIO then PS	Deputy	
1981	1983	Claude Ettori	PS		
1984	1995	Jeanne Ettori	PS		
1995	March 2001	Bernard Garcia	UDF		
March 2001	March 2008	Jean Cazanave	PS		
March 2008	May 2020	Nicole Quillien	PS		
May 2020	Incumbent	Xavier Caux	DVG		

Mirepoix is twinned with Palafrugell (Spain).

== Population ==
The inhabitants are called Mirapiciens in French.

Historical population
Year	Pop.	±% p.a.
1968	3,255	—
1975	3,273	+0.08%
1982	3,139	−0.60%
1990	2,993	−0.59%
1999	3,061	+0.25%
2007	3,107	+0.19%
2012	3,123	+0.10%
2017	3,158	+0.22%
2023	3,172	+0.07%
Source: INSEE

== Sights ==
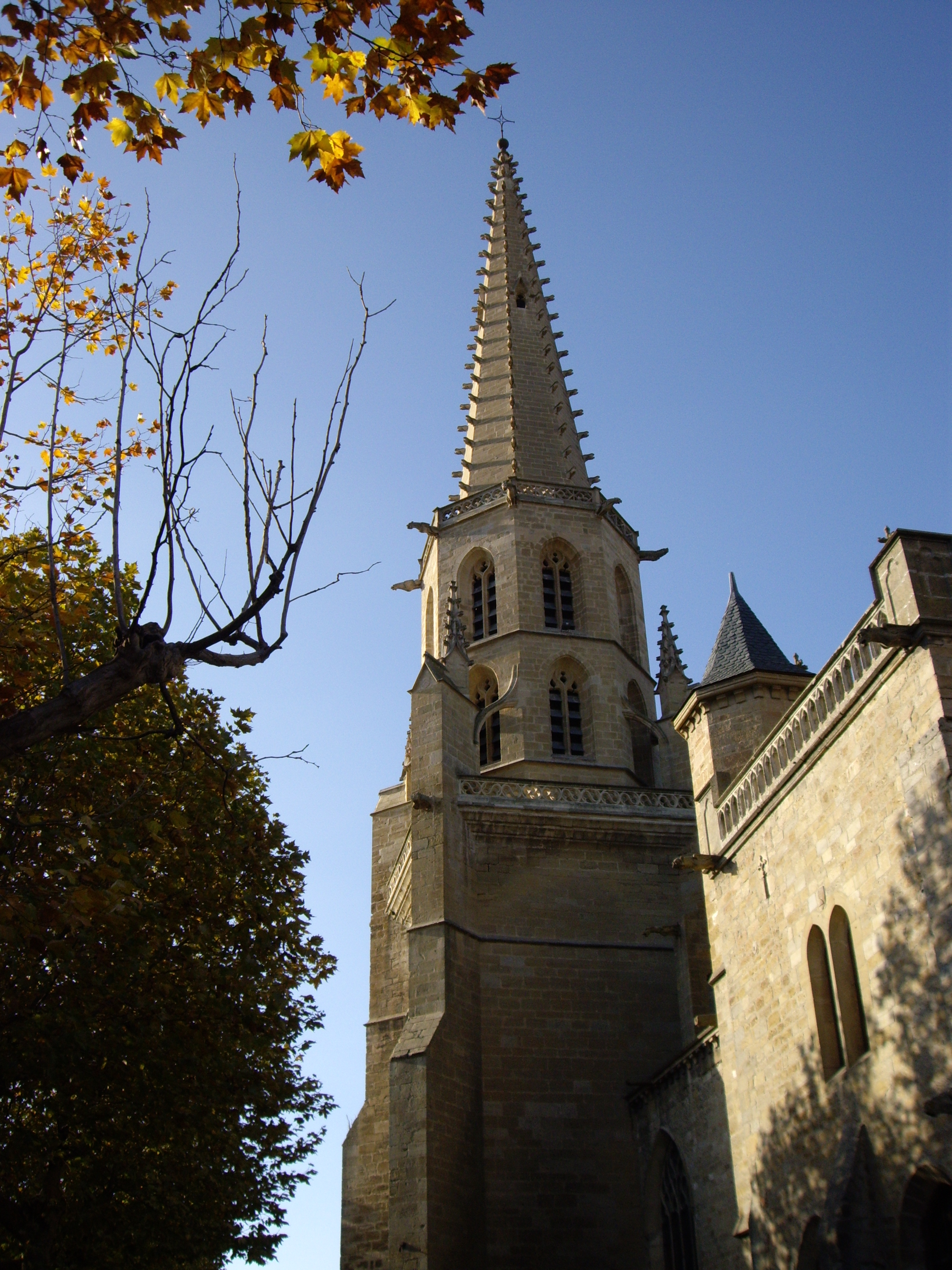
Cathédrale Saint-Maurice de Mirepoix

At the heart of Mirepoix is one of the finest surviving arcaded market squares - Les Couverts- in France. The square is bordered by houses dating from the thirteenth to the fifteenth centuries.

The mediaeval Maison des Consuls (council house) has rafter-ends carved with dozens of images of animals and monsters, and caricatures of mediaeval professions and social groups.

The cathedral of St-Maurice has the second widest Gothic arch in Europe (after Girona in Catalonia, Spain). The foundation stone was laid by Jean de Lévis on 6 May 1298. Construction continued, with interruptions, over the next six centuries. The cathedral was restored in 1858 and 1859 by Prosper Mérimée, and Eugène Viollet-le-Duc.

La Porte d'Aval dates from 1372.

Mirepoix's bridge is 206 meters long and has seven arches. It is the work of architect Jean-Rodolphe Perronet (1708–1794), whose best known works are the Pont de la Concorde in Paris (1787–1791) and the bridge of Nantes. Work on its construction was started in 1776. Near the bridge and closer to town a much smaller bridge passes over a canal; near this layer bridge is the 'chêne vert', an ancient oak tree about 800 years old.

The first mention of the ancient Château de Terride dates from 960. It was captured (together with Mirepoix as a whole) by Simon de Montfort on 22 September 1209. The castle took the name of 'Terride' in the 16th century.

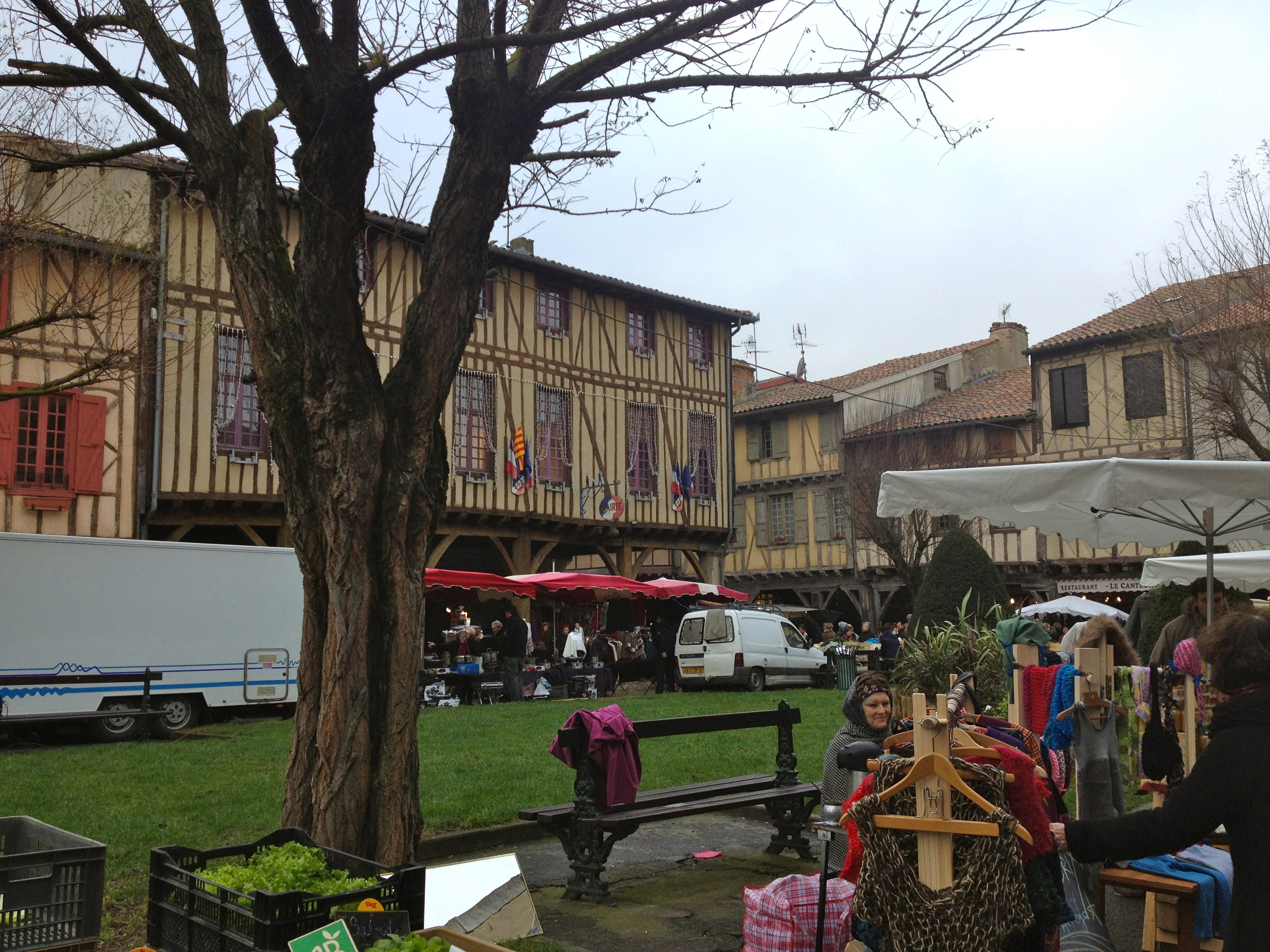
Winter market in the place des Couverts.

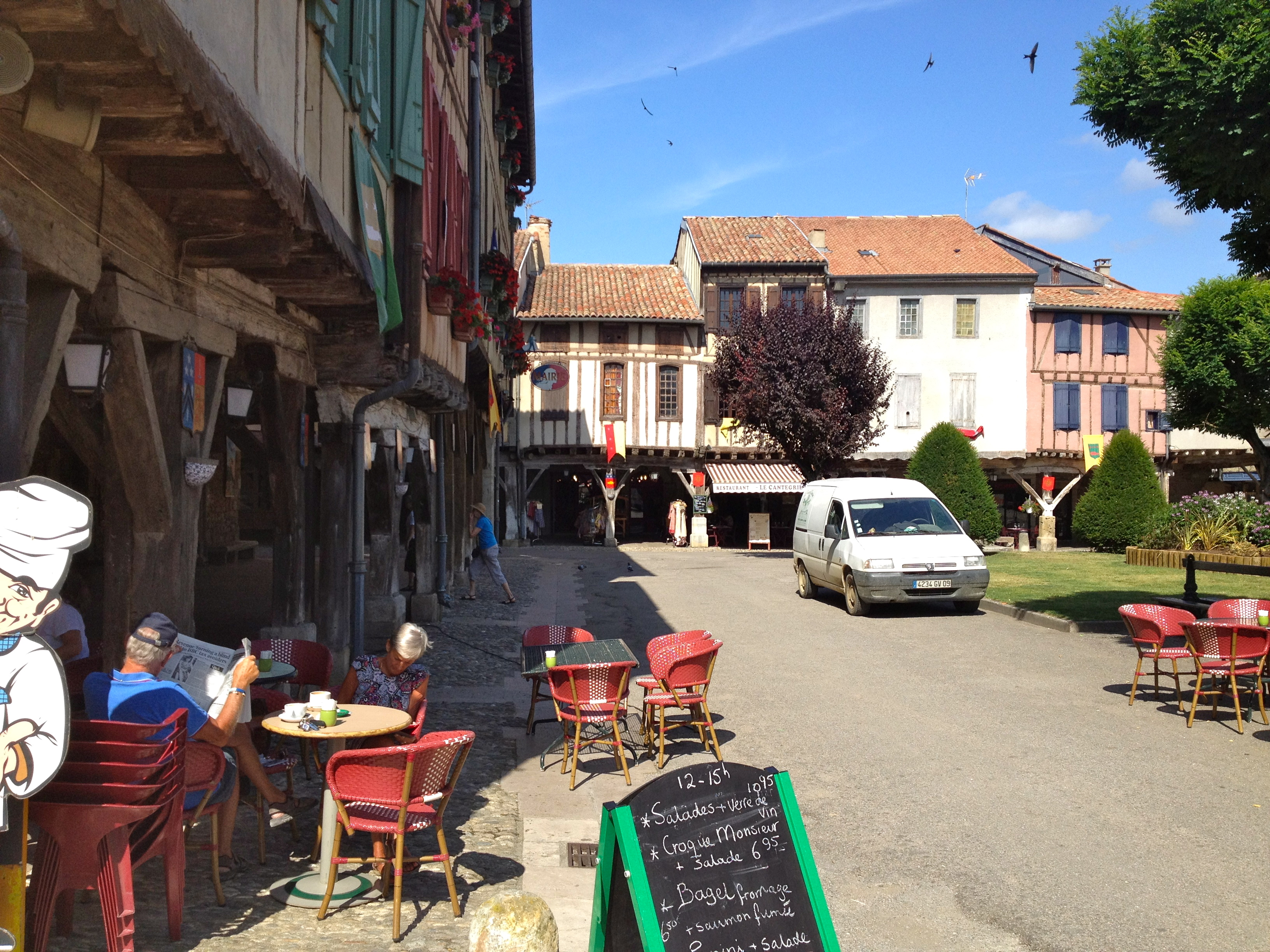
Mirepoix market square in summer.

== Notable inhabitants ==
- Jacques Fournier (c. 1280 – 1342) was Bishop of Mirepoix from 1326, and became Pope in 1334, taking the name Benedict XII. He was the third Avignon Pope.
- Pierre-Paul Riquet (1609–1680) was the engineer responsible for the construction of the Canal du Midi. He lived in Mirepoix from 1634 to 1646.
- Marie de Calages (1630–1661), born in Mirepoix, was a poet. She was crowned many times by l’Académie des Jeux Floraux.
- Jean-Joseph Vidal (1747–1819) was an astronomer, particularly noted for his study of the planet Mercury.
- Bertrand Clausel (1772–1842) was a marshal of France.
- Frédéric Soulié (1800–1847), novelist, dramatist, critic and journalist. Born in Foix, Soulié lived in Mirepoix as a young boy.
- Marie-Louise Escholier (1876–1956, née Marie-Louise Pons-Tandy), born in Mirepoix, was a writer. She was the co-author, with her husband Raymond Escholier, of the novel Cantegril. Marie-Louise Escholier and her husband are buried in the town cemetery.
- Marcel Pagnol (1895–1974), the novelist, playwright and filmmaker, taught at the École Supérieure in Mirepoix.
- Pierre Daboval (1918–2015) was an artist. He lived in Mirepoix from 1998 until his death.
- Terence Macartney-Filgate (1924-2022) was a British-Canadian film director. He has directed, written, produced or shot more than 100 films in a career spanning over 50 years.

== Cultural Life ==
MiMa is an international festival of the art of marionettes held every summer. Each year the event is built around a central theme. The line-up showcases a variety of techniques including object theatre, glove puppets, string puppets and marionettes portées (puppets carried by a handle on the back of the head).

Mirepoix Musique promotes concerts of classical music (particularly French and English) and readings throughout the year in and around Mirepoix.

Salon du Livre d’Histoire Locale de Mirepoix

The festival Swing à Mirepoix is held each year over the Easter weekend.

== See also ==
- Communes of the Ariège department
