= La Bastide-sur-l'Hers =

Commune in Occitanie, France

- Commune
- Coat of arms
- Location of La Bastide-sur-l'Hers
- Location within France Location within Occitanie
- Coordinates: 42°57′24″N 1°54′35″E
- Country: France
- Region: Occitania
- Department: Ariège
- Arrondissement: Pamiers
- Canton: Mirepoix
- Intercommunality: CC du Pays de Mirepoix

Government
  - Mayor (2020–2026): Guillaume Lopez
- Area^{1}: 4.77 km^{2} (1.84 sq mi)
- Elevation: 438 m (1,437 ft)
- Highest elevation: 721 m (2,365 ft)
- Lowest elevation: 428 m (1,404 ft)
- Population (2023): 676
  - Density: 142/km^{2} (367/sq mi)
- Time zone: UTC+01:00 (CET)
  - Summer (DST): UTC+02:00 (CEST)
- INSEE/Postal code: 09043 /09600
- ^{1} French Land Register data, which excludes lakes, ponds, glaciers > 1 km^{2} (0.386 sq mi or 247 acres) and river estuaries.

La Bastide-sur-l'Hers (French pronunciation: [la bastid syʁ lɛʁs], literally La Bastide on the Hers; Occitan: La Bastida d'Èrç) is a commune in the Ariège department in the Occitanie region of southwestern France.

The inhabitants of the commune are known as Bastidhersois or Bastidhersoises.

== Geography ==
La Bastide-sur-l'Hers is located some 28 km south-east of Pamiers and 3 km north-east of Lavelanet. Access to the commune is by the D620 road from Laroque-d'Olmes in the north-west which goes east through the commune and the village and continues east to Le Peyrat. The D16 comes from L'Aiguillon in the south and passes north inside the eastern border of the commune to the village then continues north to join the D28A south of Léran. A former railway line now a walking trail passes through the commune from west to east just north of the village. The commune has two large belts of forest across the centre and south with most of the rest of the commune farmland.

The Hers river flows from the south forming the south-eastern border before passing through the village and continuing east to eventually join the Ariège at Cintegabelle. The Ruiseeau des Écrevisses forms the southern border of the commune as it flows east to join the Hers. The Ruisseau de Pépoulant also flows east across the commune a little further north and joins the Hers.

== Toponymy ==
La Bastide-sur-l'Hers appears as la Baſtide de Cougoust on the 1750 Cassini Map and as la Bastide on the 1790 version.

== Administration ==
List of Successive Mayors

From	To	Name
1983	2020	Jacky Barbe
2020	2026	Guillaume Lopez

== Demography ==
Historical population

Year	Pop.	±% p.a.
1793	501	—
1800	490	−0.32%
1806	573	+2.64%
1821	566	−0.08%
1831	620	+0.92%
1836	626	+0.19%
1841	585	−1.35%
1846	673	+2.84%
1851	706	+0.96%
1856	679	−0.78%
1861	763	+2.36%
1866	774	+0.29%
1872	817	+0.91%
1876	877	+1.79%
1881	912	+0.79%
1886	965	+1.14%
1891	981	+0.33%
1896	1,024	+0.86%
1901	976	−0.96%

Year	Pop.	±% p.a.
1906	951	−0.52%
1911	982	+0.64%
1921	956	−0.27%
1926	929	−0.57%
1931	880	−1.08%
1936	797	−1.96%
1946	751	−0.59%
1954	850	+1.56%
1962	870	+0.29%
1968	796	−1.47%
1975	782	−0.25%
1982	763	−0.35%
1990	733	−0.50%
1999	674	−0.93%
2007	720	+0.83%
2012	737	+0.47%
2017	678	−1.65%
2023	676	−0.05%

Source: EHESS and INSEE

== Sites and Monuments ==
- The Church of Our Lady of the Assumption. The keystone indicates a date of 1527. An organ was installed there in 2008 following an anonymous bequest to the pastor of the parish, who also donated. This instrument, with two keyboards and pedals, was built by Krischer (Rouen) in 1893.
- A Protestant church was built in 1826
- A Covered Market from the late 19th century

There is a Monumental Painting (18th century) in a house which is registered as an historical object but its location is unclear.

== Notable people linked to the commune ==
- Philippe Tissié was born in La Bastide-sur-l'Hers on 18 October 1852.
- Annie Campayo wife of SABY was born in la Bastide-sur-l'Hers on 3 February 1951.

== See also ==
- Communes of the Ariège department
