= Aigues-Vives, Ariège =

Commune in Occitanie, France

Aigues-Vives
- Commune
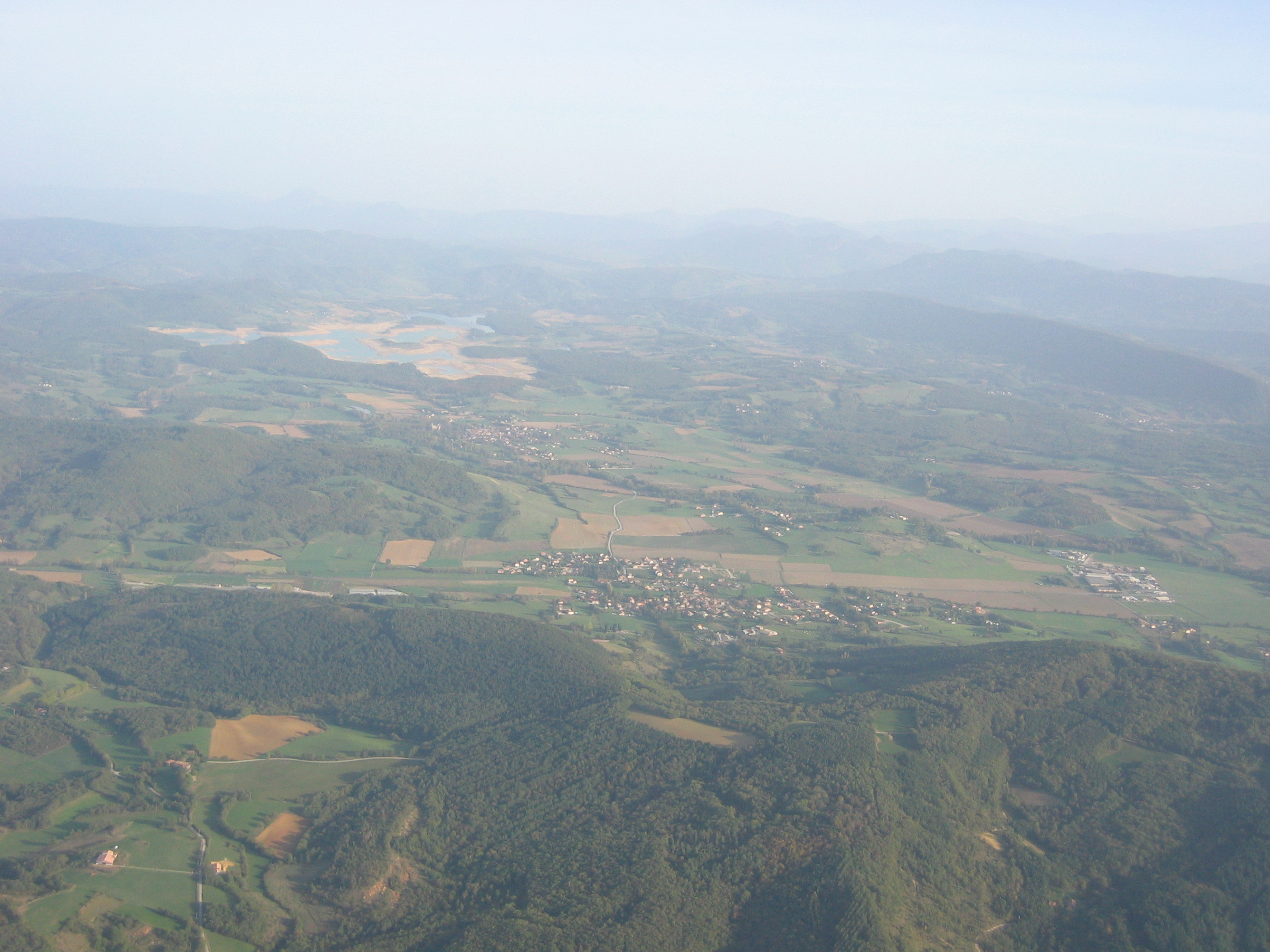
- View of Aigues-Vives, Léran and the Lac de Montbel

- Coat of arms
- Location of Aigues-Vives
- Location within France Location within Occitanie
- Coordinates: 42°59′51″N 1°52′35″E
- Country: France
- Region: Occitania
- Department: Ariège
- Arrondissement: Pamiers
- Canton: Mirepoix
- Intercommunality: Pays de Mirepoix

Government
  - Mayor (2020–2026): Jean-Luc Tardy
- Area^{1}: 5.16 km^{2} (1.99 sq mi)
- Elevation: 410 m (1,350 ft)
- Highest elevation: 621 m (2,037 ft)
- Lowest elevation: 391 m (1,283 ft)
- Population (2023): 625
  - Density: 121/km^{2} (314/sq mi)
- Time zone: UTC+01:00 (CET)
  - Summer (DST): UTC+02:00 (CEST)
- INSEE/Postal code: 09002 /09600
- ^{1} French Land Register data, which excludes lakes, ponds, glaciers > 1 km^{2} (0.386 sq mi or 247 acres) and river estuaries.

Aigues-Vives (French pronunciation: [ɛɡ viv]; Occitan: Aigasvivas) is a commune in the Ariège department in the Occitanie region of southwestern France.

The inhabitants of the commune are known as Aigues-Vivesiens or Aigues-Vivesiennes.

== Geography ==
=== Location ===
Aigues-Vives is located both in the Pays d'Olmes and the Canton of Mirepoix on the D625 main road (formerly Route nationale N625) which runs from Saint-Quentin-la-Tour in the north through the heart of the commune and the town to Laroque-d'Olmes in the south. It is about 90 km in a direct line south by south west of Narbonne. Augues-Vives can also be accessed from the east on Highway D28 from Léran. Apart from the Aigues-Vives town there is one other residential area to the north of the town called Le Kartare. The commune is forested to the west and the east with the centre of the commune farmland (apart from the town).

=== Hydrography ===
The Countirou stream, which has its source in the nearby village of Tabre, passes through the commune of Aigues-Vives, along the D625 road, and comes to an end at Hers-Vif near Mirepoix. A number of streams traverse the commune and flow into Coutirou including the: Fontaine de Toustou, the Couxou, the Ribalerie, and the Saint-Paul).

Lake Montbel is located three kilometres south-east of the commune and is visible from the hills above Aigues-Vives.

=== Geology and terrain ===
The village is located in an area formed during the Tertiary period with a soil which is a mix of conglomerate and sandstone, on strata called the "conglomerates of Palassou" located on the North Pyrenees faultline.

Aigues-Vives is surrounded by several hills, the highest being 630m above sea level, on the western edge of the commune. The village itself is 420m high on average with the lowest point being 391m.

=== Seismicity and disasters ===
According to decree No. 2010-1255 of 22 October 2010 on the delimitation of the seismicity of the French territory, Aigues-Vives is exposed to a risk level of 3 (moderate).

Other risks facing Aigues-Vives are forest fires, industrial hazards, and risks due to transport of dangerous goods. Past disasters include the November 1982 storm, flooding and mudslides in January 1992 and mudslides in November–December 1996.

=== Toponymy ===
Aigues-Vives or in Occitan Aigas Vivas meaning "whitewater" takes its name from springs in the surrounding hills. There were also these old forms: Aygas vivas (1300) Aquisvivis (1377), and Aiguesvives (1801).

== History ==
The first written mention of Aigues-Vives dates to 1301. The village was under the control of Mirepoix, ten miles to the north, until 1329, when Gaston de Lévis-Léran appropriated the castle and the surrounding lands. The village remained in the possession of the Lévis-Léran family until the Revolution.

The main industries in the 20th century were the making of "horn combs" and textiles, as is the case for much of the Pays d'Olmes.

== Heraldry ==
Arms of Aigues-Vives	Blazon: Or, paly of 2 vert and in chief the same.

== Policy and administration ==
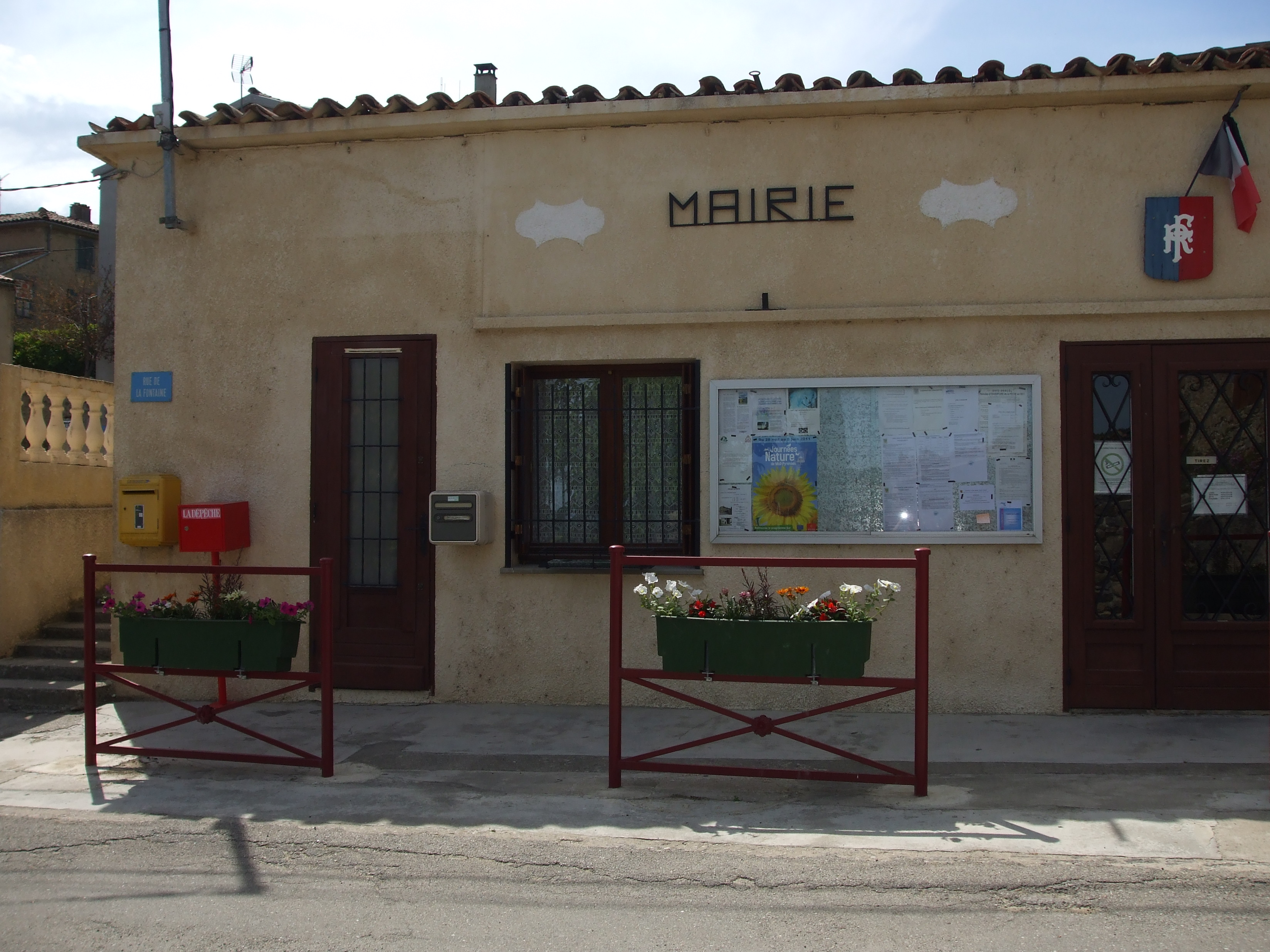
Town Hall of Aigues-Vives

=== Municipal administration ===
Based on the number of inhabitants (more than 100, less than 499), the town has a council of 11 members.

List of mayors

From	To	Name	Party
2001	2008	Ange Fernand Mendes	
2008	2020	Christian Mascarenc	DVG
2020	2026	Jean-Luc Tardy	

== Population and society ==
=== Population ===
Historical population
Year	Pop.	±% p.a.
1968	188	—
1975	197	+0.67%
1982	339	+8.06%
1990	462	+3.95%
1999	485	+0.54%
2007	523	+0.95%
2012	598	+2.72%
2017	666	+2.18%
2023	625	−1.05%
Source: INSEE

=== Education ===
Aigues-Vives has a kindergarten and primary school, with 68 students (for the academic year 2010–2011).

=== Sports ===
Several sports facilities exist in Aigues-Vives: a football club, a gymnasium, a tai chi group, a bicycle club, and a leisure centre which has a go-karting track and a mini-golf area.

=== Health ===
There is no pharmacy or doctor in Aigues-Vives with the closest being at Laroque-d'Olmes about 3 kilometres away. The nearest hospital is in Lavelanet seven kilometres away.

== Economy ==
=== Incomes of the population and taxation ===
In 2017, the median net household income was €19,290.

=== Employment, business and trade ===
The rate of unemployment in 2017 was 15.5% and slightly higher among women than men.

There are several companies in the building trades, particularly masonry and housepainting in Aigues-Vives and there is also a textile company and a website design business. There is an Asian caterer, a camping ground, and a Karting Club.

Agriculture and livestock is another sector of activity in Aigues-Vives: wheat, forage grass, and vines are grown, while cattle and sheep are also raised. The nearby forests are exploited and are rich in mushrooms.

=== Wind farm project ===
A project to create a wind farm on the ridges of the Serre du Tut was launched and then abandoned due to strong opposition, especially from the Association for the Preservation and Tourism and the Sites in the Pyrénées Mountains.

== Local culture and heritage ==
=== Sites and monuments ===
- A Romanesque Church dedicated to Saint Stephen with a bell tower. There is an old baptismal font with an octagonal limestone basin and sandstone base (1657). It has been transformed into a font and is registered as an historical object. The War Memorial is also in the church.
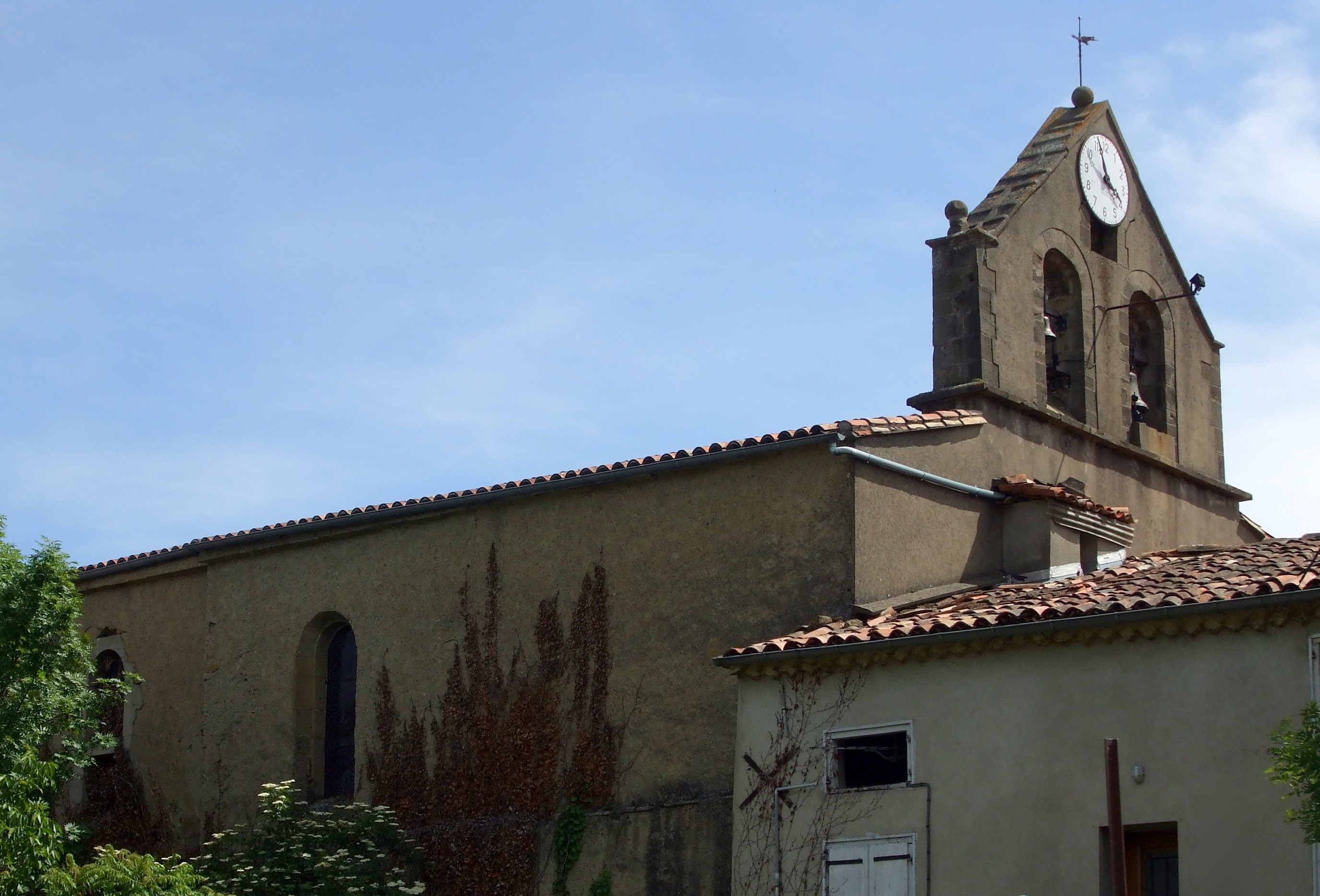
The church from the Northwest

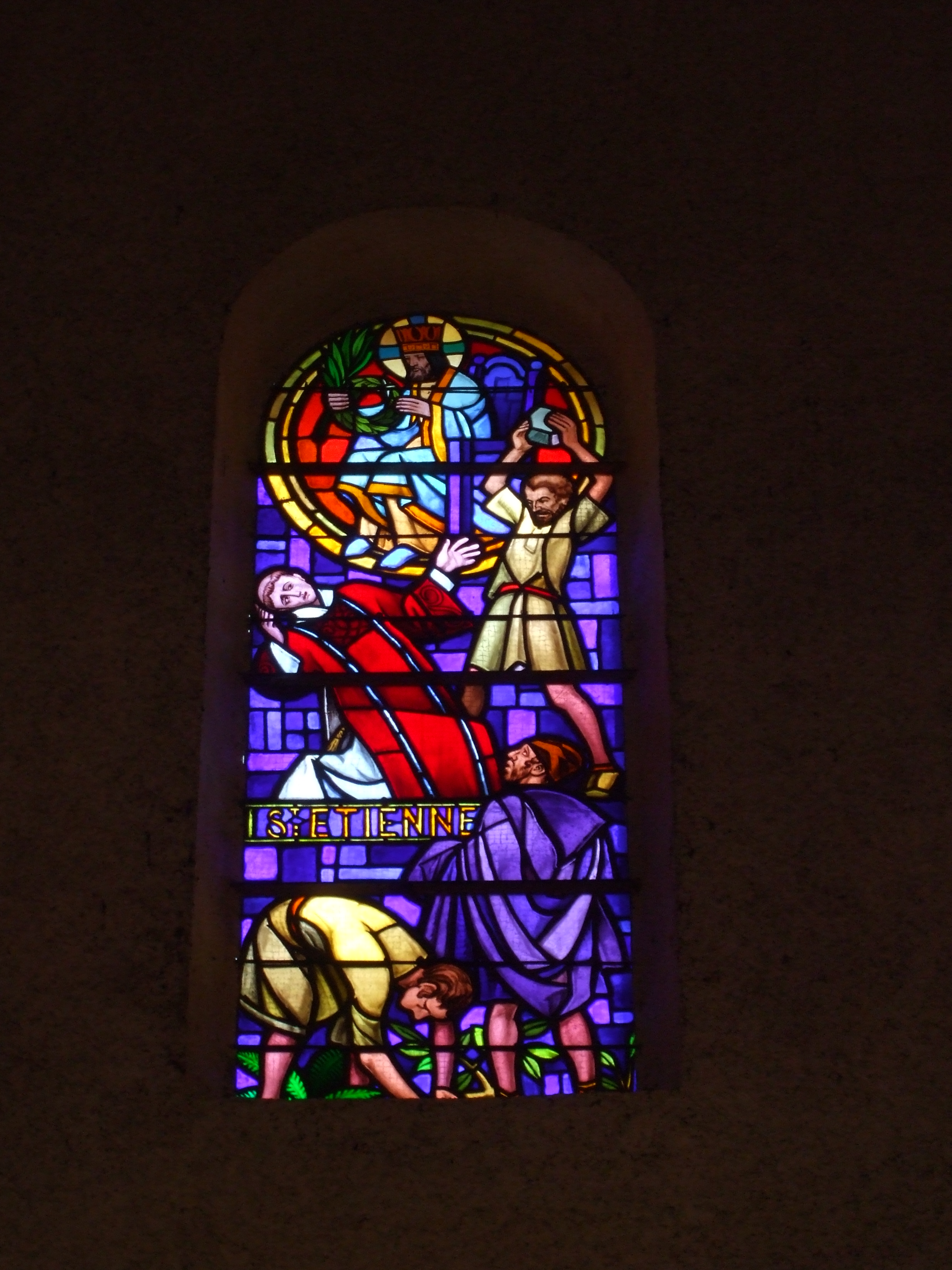
Stained glass window depicting the martyrdom of Saint Stephen

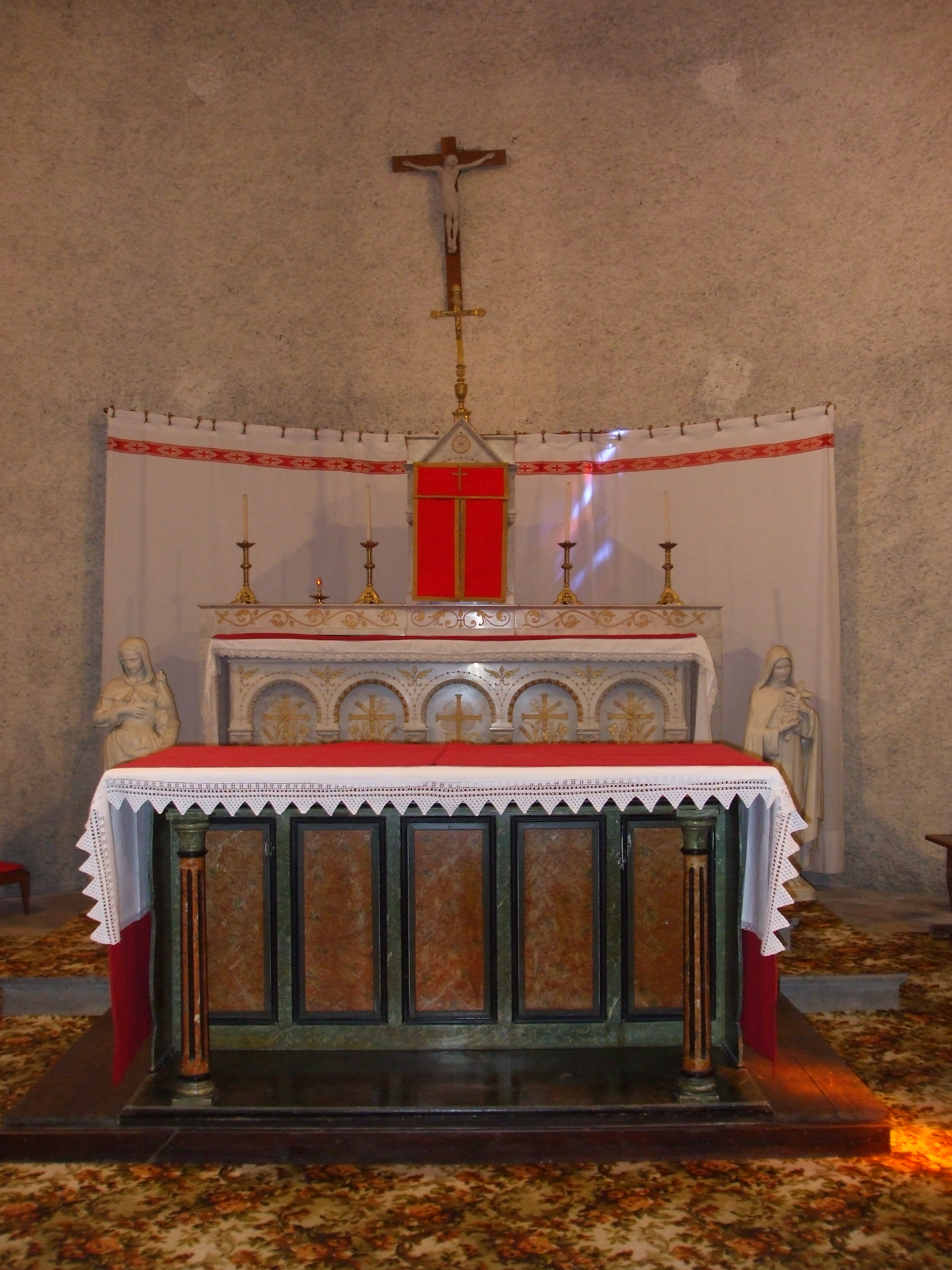
The altar
- Several 'Wayside crosses scattered around the village were used as Oratories. Processions in honour of the Virgin Mary are organized there.
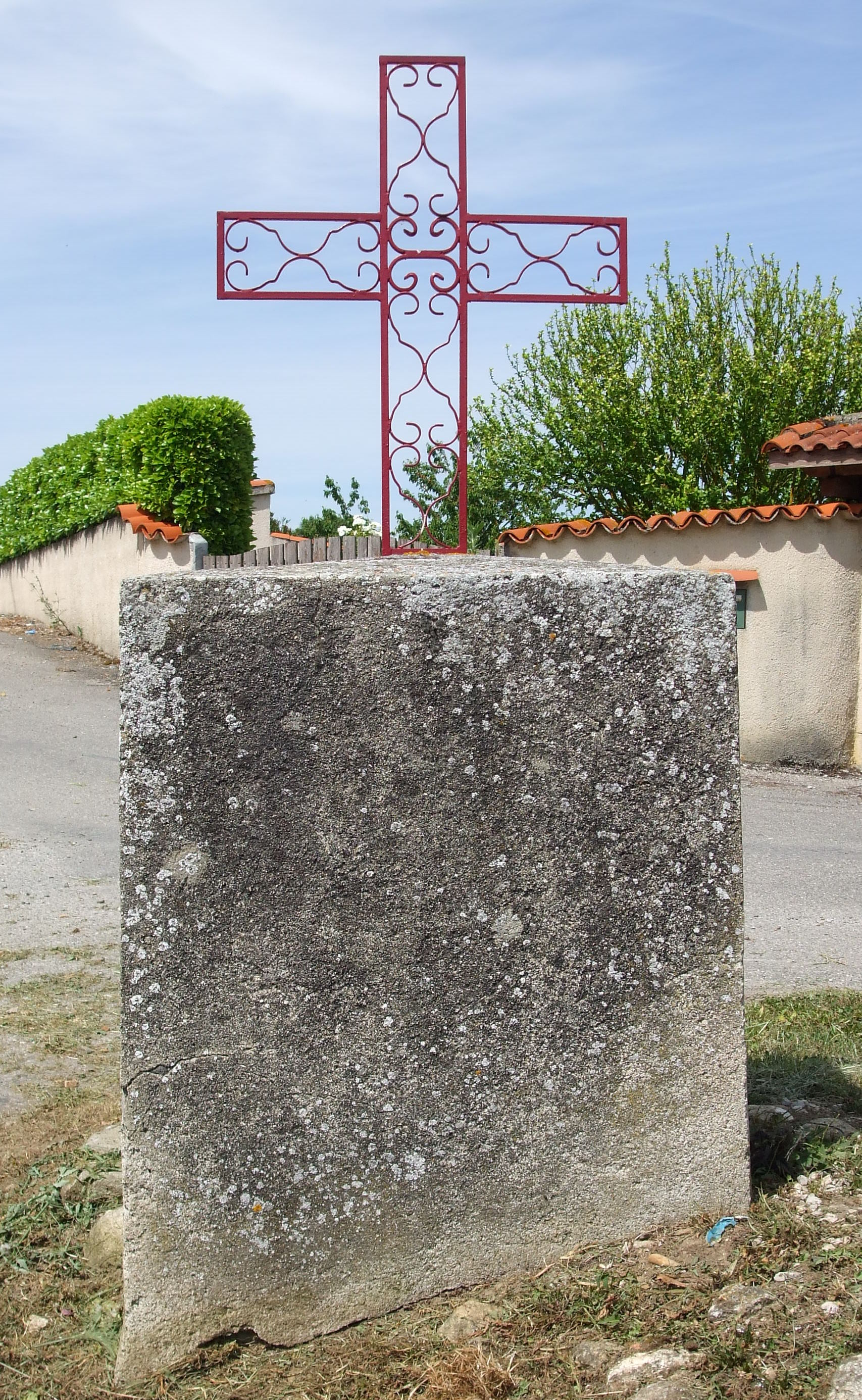
Cross at Aigues-Vives 1

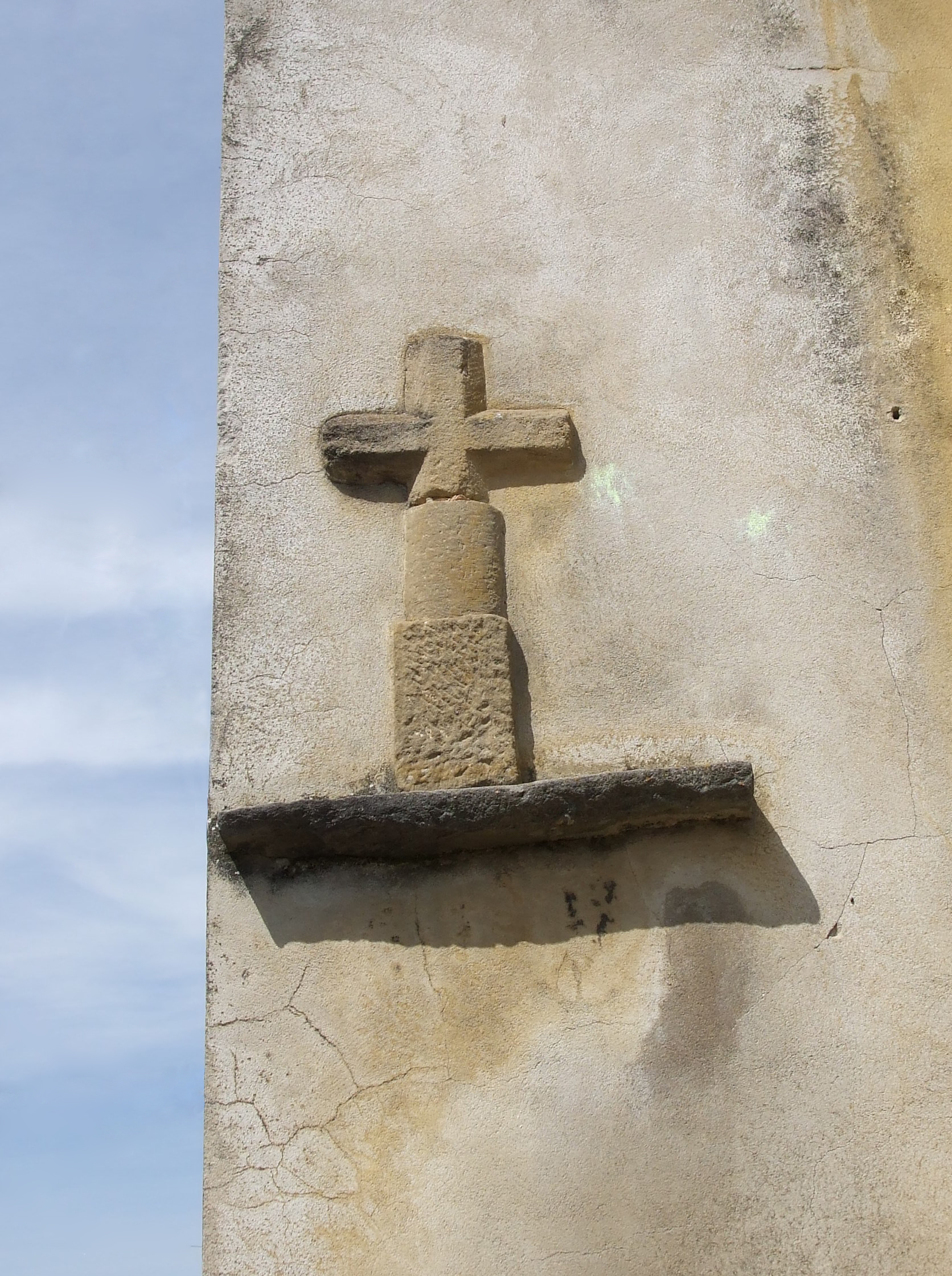
Cross at Aigues-Vives 2

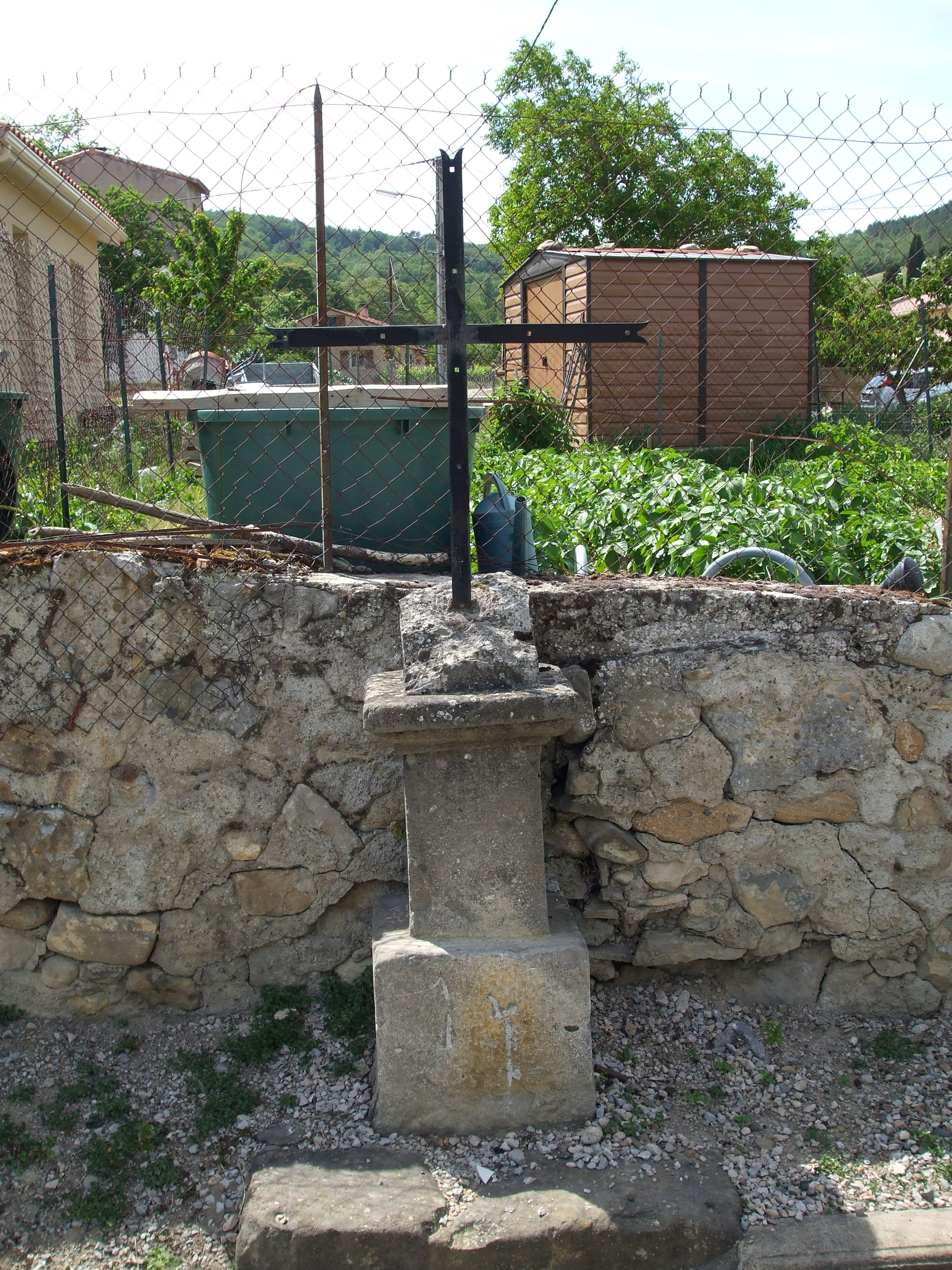
Cross at Aigues-Vives 3

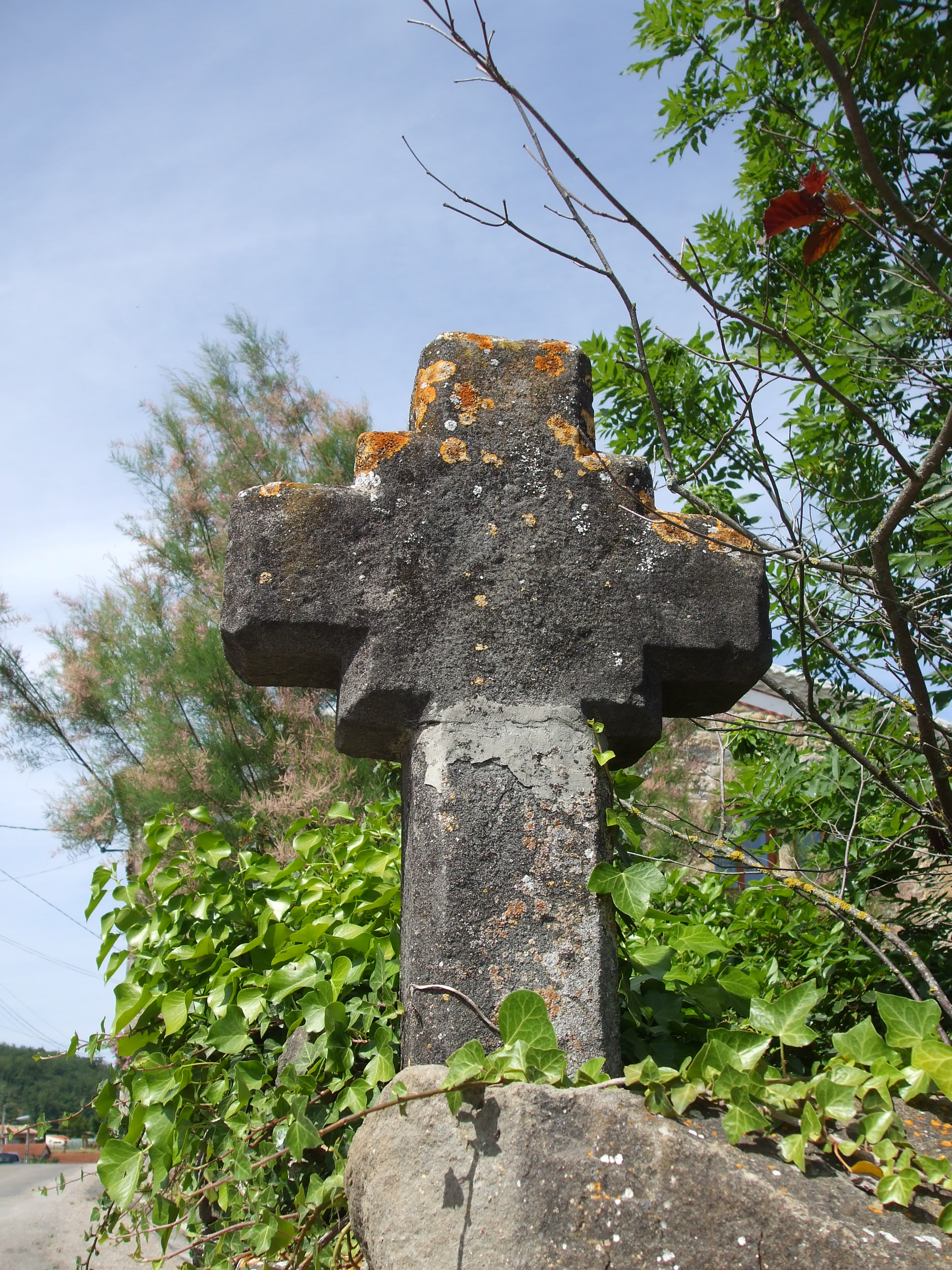
Cross at Aigues-Vives 4
- A Column with a square pedestal, topped by a statue of the Virgin is located in the parking lot near the church. It is about four metres high.
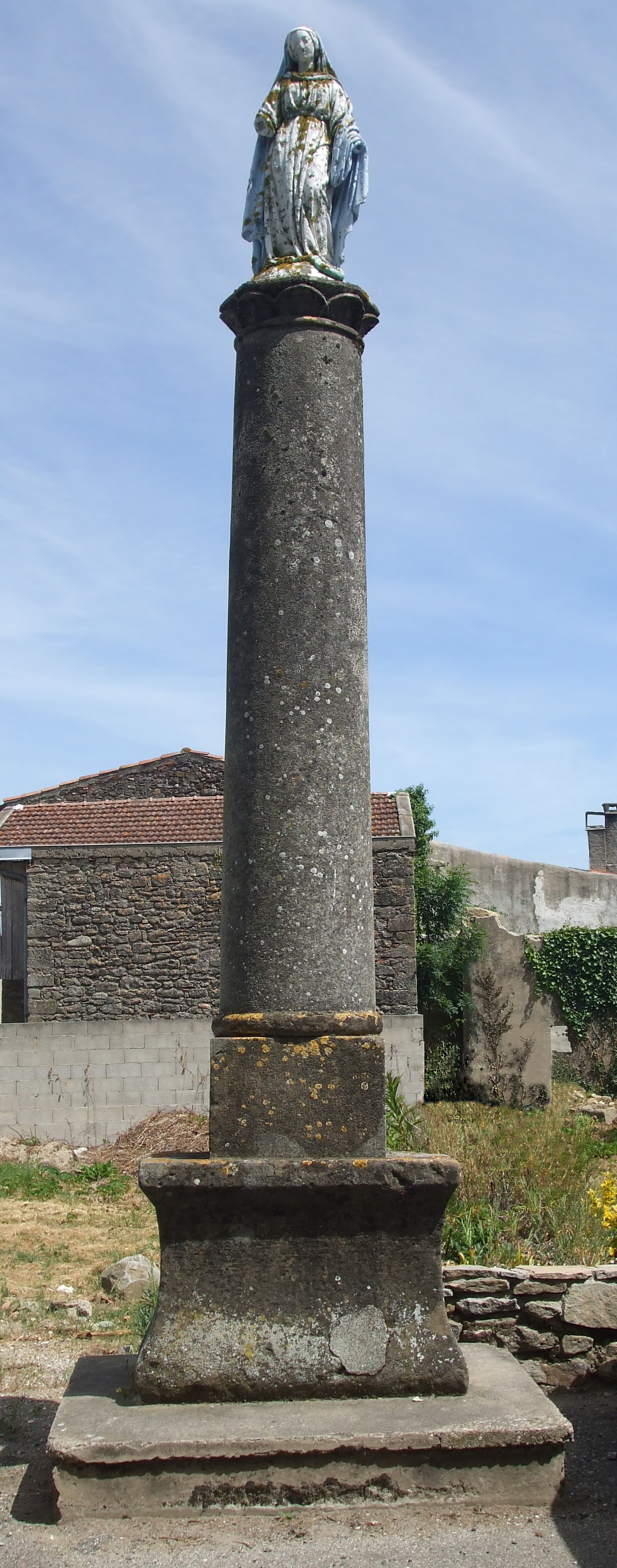
The Column

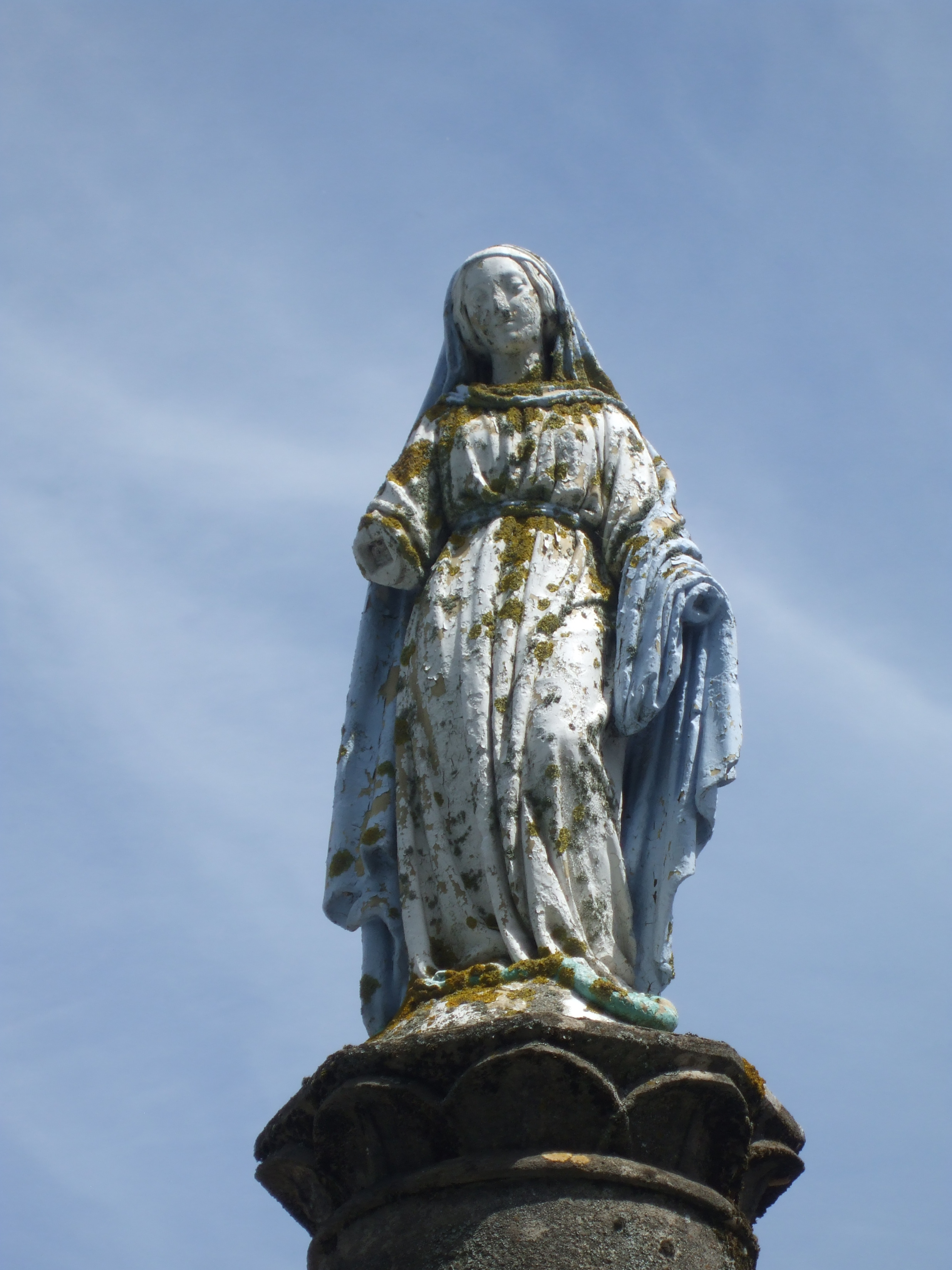
Statue on the Column
- An Old Fountain with a hand pump which is in no state to use.

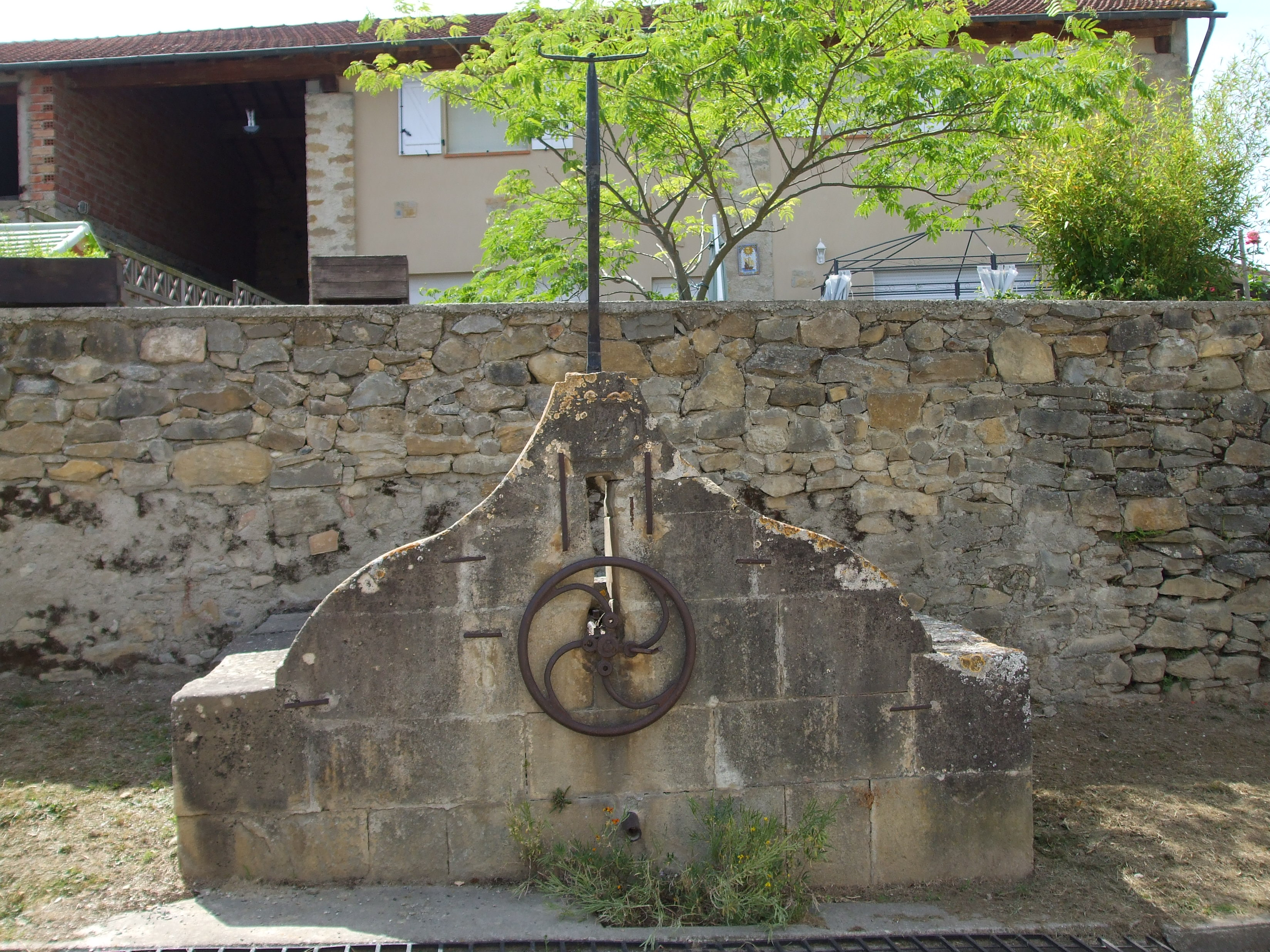
Old fountain in the village centre

- Dry stone huts in ruins, formerly used by farmers.
- Lake Montbel is 5 km southeast of the commune.
- The Ecomuseum of Camping in the Serre.

=== Notable people ===
- Faust Nadal, a colonial physician. Born in Aigues-Vives
- Jean Pelissier (1883–1939), a historian, sociologist, and journalist born in Aigues-Vives

== See also ==
- Communes of the Ariège department
- Lake Montbel

=== Bibliography ===
- History and Heritage of Mirepoix Country, Mirepoix Tourist Office, 1999, p. 115-119. (in French)
