= L'Aiguillon =

Commune in Occitanie, France

- Commune
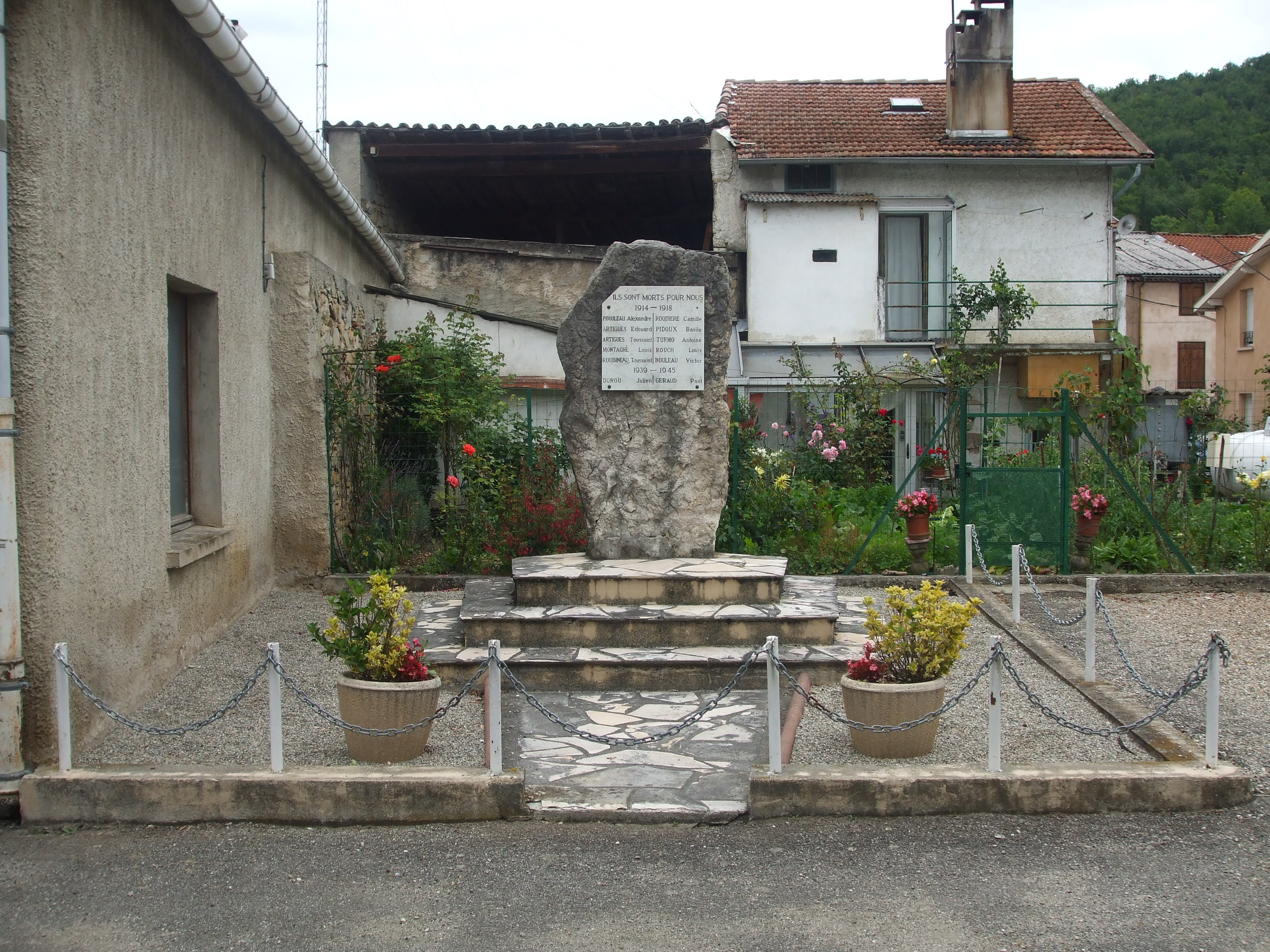
- War memorial
- Location of L'Aiguillon
- Location within France Location within Occitanie
- Coordinates: 42°55′01″N 1°54′06″E
- Country: France
- Region: Occitania
- Department: Ariège
- Arrondissement: Pamiers
- Canton: Pays d'Olmes
- Intercommunality: Pays d'Olmes

Government
  - Mayor (2021–2026): Geneviève Richou
- Area^{1}: 6.37 km^{2} (2.46 sq mi)
- Elevation: 463 m (1,519 ft)
- Highest elevation: 920 m (3,020 ft)
- Lowest elevation: 457 m (1,499 ft)
- Population (2023): 372
  - Density: 58.4/km^{2} (151/sq mi)
- Time zone: UTC+01:00 (CET)
  - Summer (DST): UTC+02:00 (CEST)
- INSEE/Postal code: 09003 /09300
- ^{1} French Land Register data, which excludes lakes, ponds, glaciers > 1 km^{2} (0.386 sq mi or 247 acres) and river estuaries.

L'Aiguillon (French pronunciation: [lɛɡɥijɔ̃]; Occitan: L'Agulhon) is a commune in the Ariège department in the Occitanie region of southwestern France.

== Geography ==
=== Location ===
L'Aiguillon is part of the natural region of Olmes Country and lies halfway between Lavelanet, the capital of the canton and Bélesta. It has a number of hamlets and localities including Terris, Durenat, Couchou, Pagès, Jordy, Ramoundino, Les Peyriquets, Saint Charles, and Roudière.

The D117 road (the former National Route N117) passes through the commune and is joined in the centre of the village by the D16 road.

=== Neighbouring communes and villages ===
Source:

=== Hydrology ===
The Hers traverses the commune in the north at the foot of the Crète de l’Arse. Several tributaries join it within the commune: streams of Benaix, Mede, and Bacref.

=== Geology and relief ===
The commune lies at the bottom of a gorge carved by the Hers in the Massif de Plantaurel of the Pyrenees Mountains. The village is sandwiched between the peak of Mede to the south which rises to 912 metres (2,992 feet) above sea level and the peak of the Arse to the north whose highest point is 718 metres (2,356 feet). The latter is cut off from the Bouchard peak by the Balussous Pass where the Hers turns north (see map).

== Toponymy ==
L'Aiguillon was formerly spelled L’Éguillon.

In Occitan L'Aiguillon is called agulhon which means "a sharp height".

== History ==
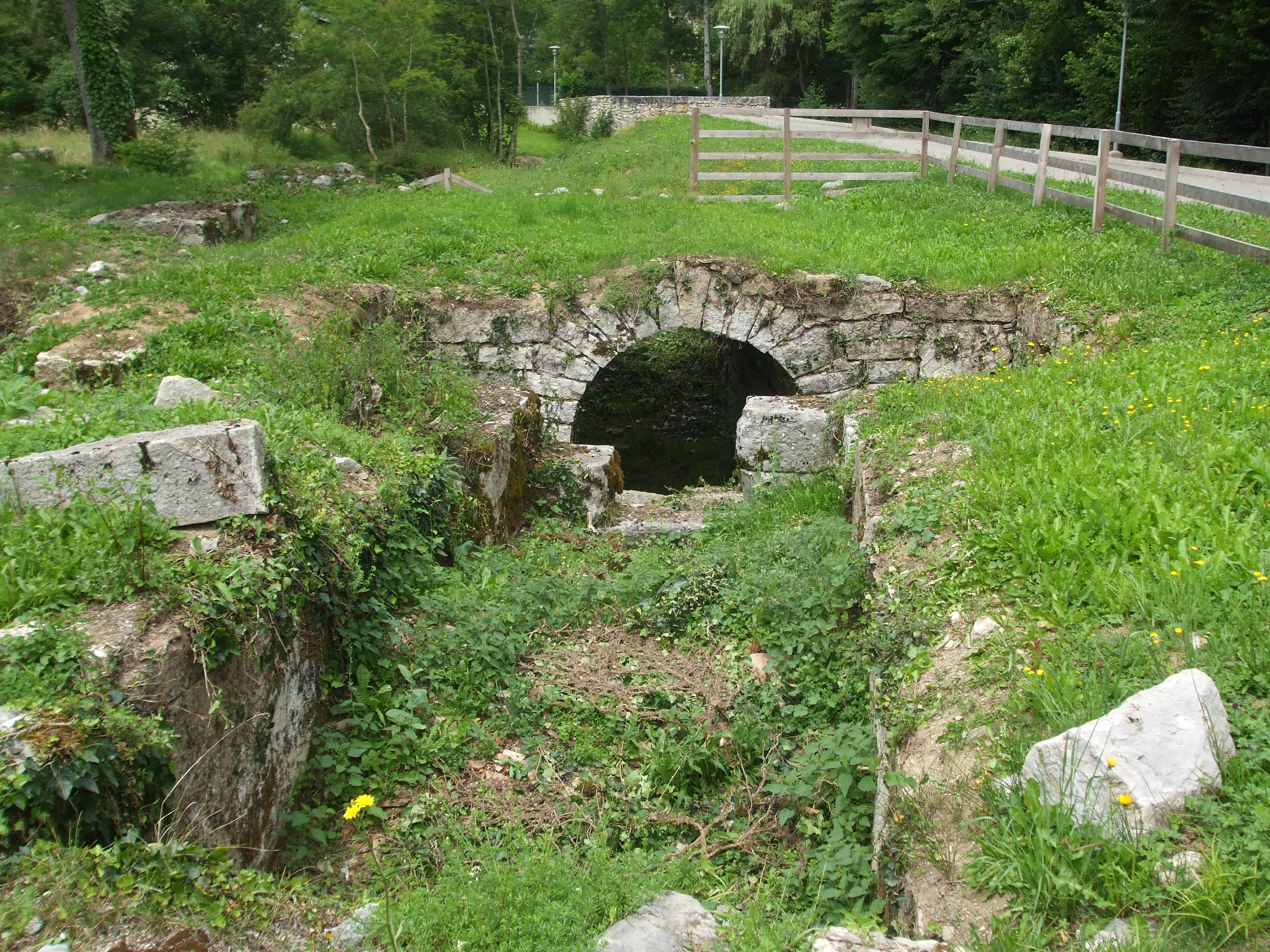
Ruins of a millrace subsequently transformed into factory making horn combs.

The Lordship of L'Aiguillon came under Mirepoix until the sharing of the fief in 1329 when it passed to the authority of Léran. From the 16th century L'Aiguillon was part of the barony of Bélesta with the lordships of Bélesta and Fougax. The village was part of the commune of Bélesta until its separation in 1926.

The main industries in the 19th and 20th centuries were, as is the case in all of Olmes Country, were those of horn comb manufacturing (formerly made of boxwood) and spinning.

== Administration ==
List of mayors

| From | To | Name | Party |
|---|---|---|---|
| 2001 | 2008 | Christian Vanhooydonck | |
| 2008 | 2020 | Claude Camanes | DVG |
| 2021 | 2026 | Geneviève Richou | |

== Population ==
The inhabitants of the commune are known as Aiguillonnois or Aiguillonnoises in French.

Historical population

| Year | Pop. | ±% p.a. |
|---|---|---|
| 1931 | 420 | — |
| 1936 | 423 | +0.14% |
| 1946 | 408 | −0.36% |
| 1954 | 414 | +0.18% |
| 1962 | 403 | −0.34% |
| 1968 | 372 | −1.33% |
| 1975 | 391 | +0.71% |

| Year | Pop. | ±% p.a. |
|---|---|---|
| 1982 | 437 | +1.60% |
| 1990 | 480 | +1.18% |
| 1999 | 422 | −1.42% |
| 2007 | 391 | −0.95% |
| 2012 | 385 | −0.31% |
| 2017 | 429 | +2.19% |
| 2023 | 372 | −2.35% |

Source: EHESS and INSEE

== Sites and monuments ==
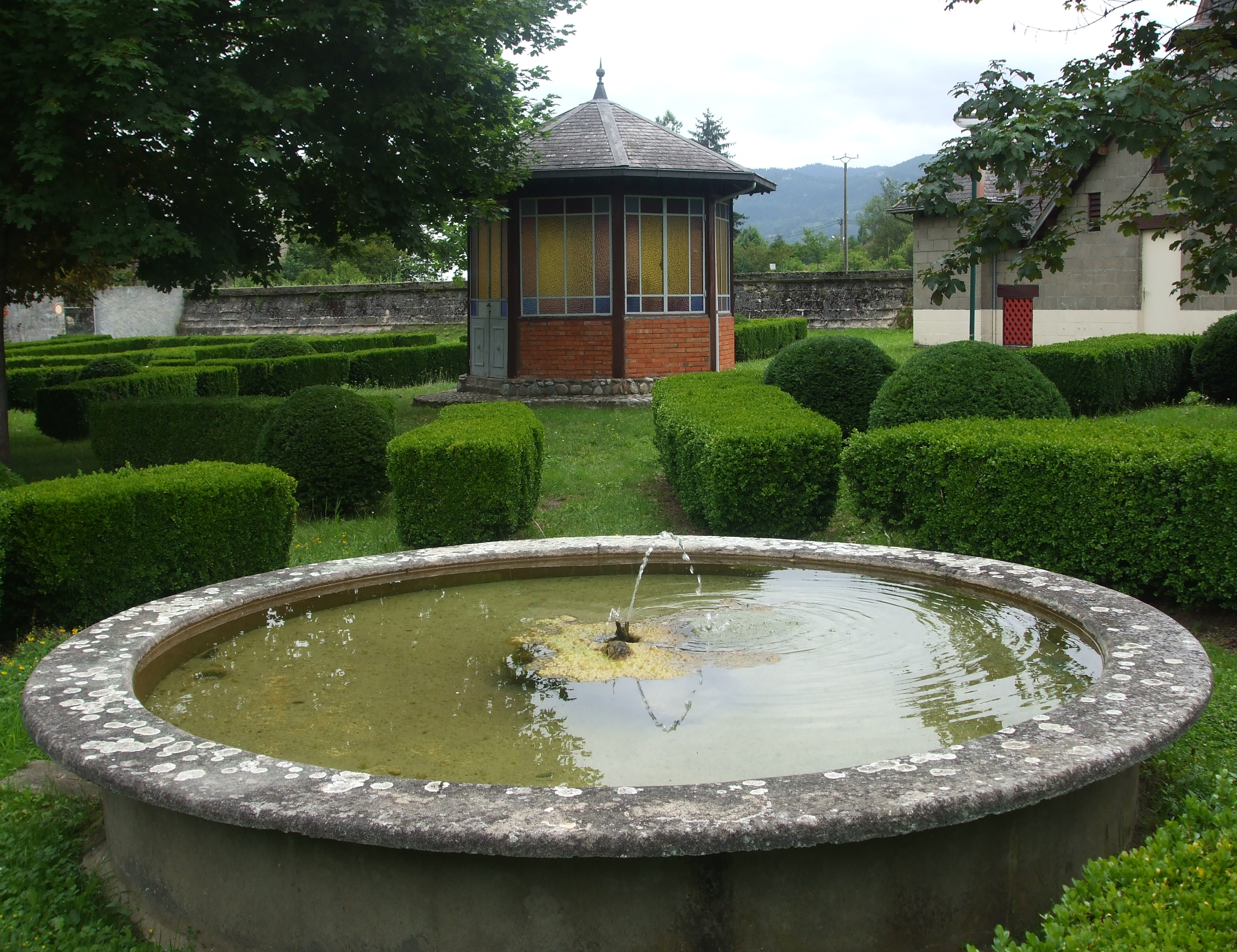
View of the design of the garden in the French Garden. Background right is a miniature house.

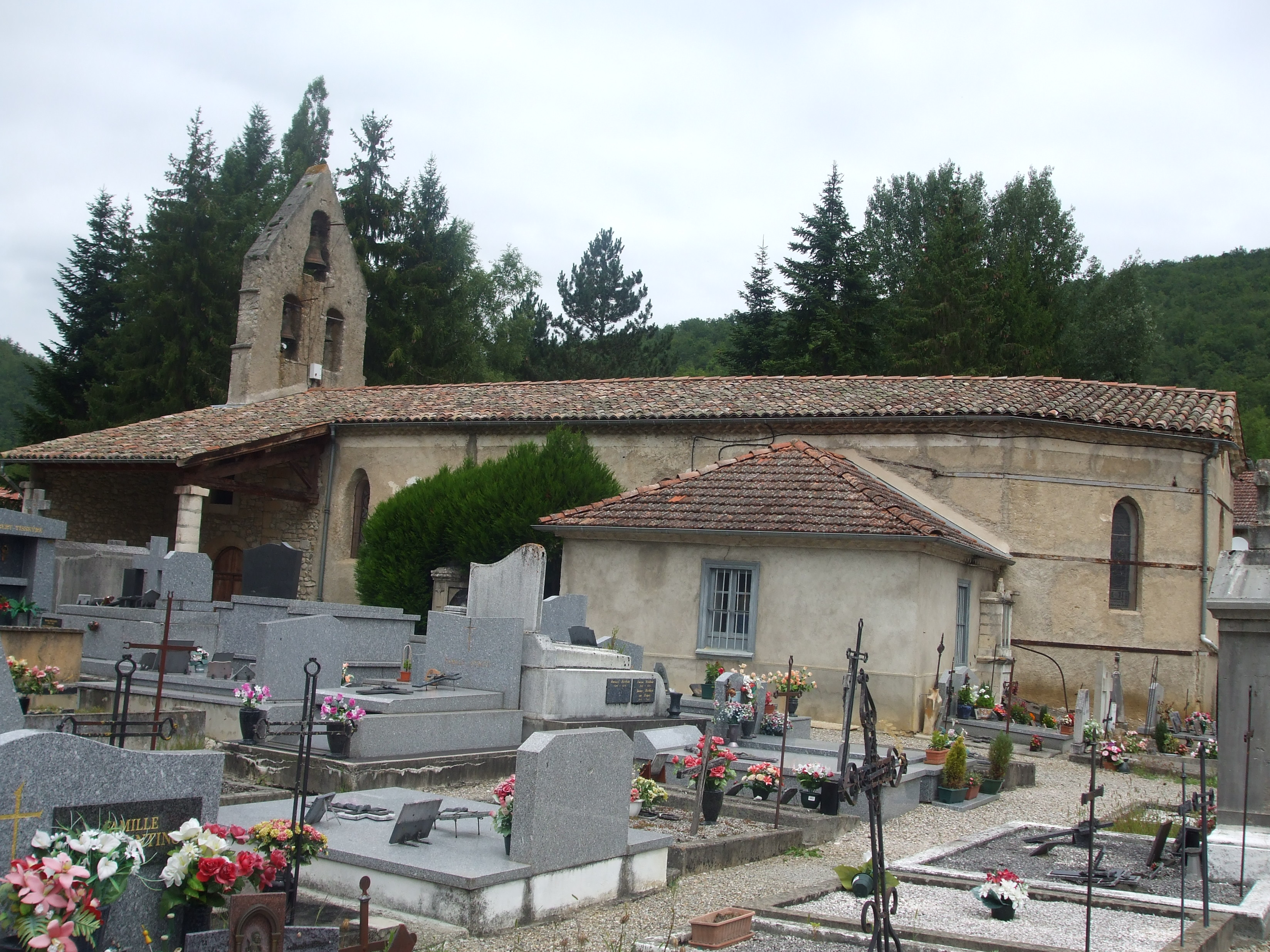
View of the church.

- A Sawmill in marble from the 19th century (built under an authorisation of Charles X on 21 February 1827) was updated in 2005. *A building which was a Flour mill prior to 1747, was transformed into a factory making horn combs but is now in ruins.
- The Church combines both classical and modern architectural features (especially the entrance). Formerly consecrated to the Virgin Mary, it is now dedicated to Saint Sernin. There was also a chapel dedicated to Saint Michael near the present church (late 15th century).
- A French formal garden next to the cemetery with a gazebo at its centre.
- There are also several Monumental Crosses.

== Notable people linked to the commune ==
- Father Edouard Lafuste (died 17 November 1935 in L'Aiguillon), the village priest, was the author of numerous historical studies.

== See also ==
- Communes of the Ariège department

=== External links ===
- L’Aiguillon on the old National Geographic Instituite website (in French)
- L'Aiguillon on Géoportail, National Geographic Institute (IGN) website (in French)
- 'l'Eguillon on the 1750 Cassini Map
