= House of Lévis =

French noble family

Lévis
- Country: France

The House of Lévis or Lévis-Mirepoix is an old French noble family. The family originally came from the village of Lévis-Saint-Nom in the Chevreuse valley, in the Yvelines département of Île-de-France.

One line of the family bore the title of Duke of Ventadour, created in 1589 by Henry IV of France, while the other bore the title of Duke of Mirepoix, created in 1751 by Louis XV.

== Notable members ==
- Philippe de Levis (1435–1475), French Roman Catholic bishop and cardinal
- Louis Charles de Lévis, Duke of Ventadour (1647–1717), French nobleman
- Anne-Claude de Lévis (1692–1765), French antiquarian
- Gaston Pierre de Lévis (1699–1757), Marshal of France
- François Gaston de Lévis (1719–1787), Marshal of France
- Pierre-Marc-Gaston de Lévis (1764–1830), French politician and aphorist
- Antoine de Lévis-Mirepoix (1884–1981), French historian, novelist and essayist
- Philomène Marie Charlotte Gaudérique Félicité Ghislaine de Lévis-Mirepoix (1887–1978), pen name Claude Silve, French writer
