= Aigues-Vives =

Aigues-Vives is the name of several communes in France:

- Aigues-Vives, Ariège, in the Ariège département
- Aigues-Vives, Aude, in the Aude département
- Aigues-Vives, Gard, in the Gard département
- Aigues-Vives, Hérault, in the Hérault département

Same pronunciation:

- Ayguesvives, in the Haute-Garonne département
