= Joseph Pérez =

French historian (1931–2020)

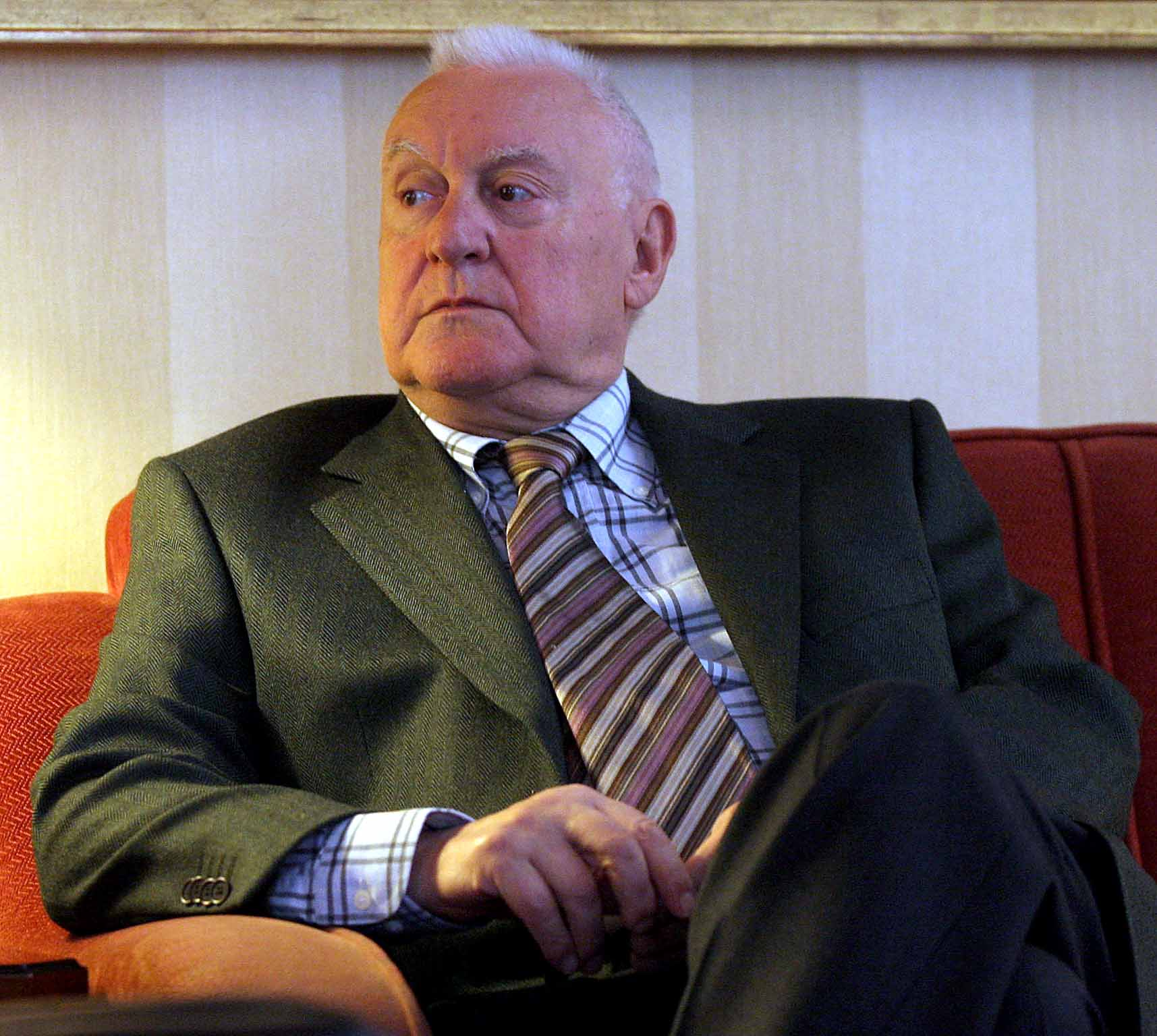
- Joseph Pérez in 2009.
- Born: 14 January 1931; Laroque-d'Olmes, France
- Died: 8 October 2020 (aged 89); Bordeaux
- Occupation: Historian

Joseph Pérez (14 January 1931 – 8 October 2020) was a French historian specializing in Spanish history. Pérez specialized in the births of the modern Spanish state and the Latin American nations. Among his books, he examined the independence movements of Hispanic America; Ferdinand and Isabella, the Catholic Monarchs; Holy Roman Emperor Charles V, and Philip II of Spain.

== Biography ==
Joseph Pérez was born in Laroque-d'Olmes in the Ariège department, which is in the south of France near the Spanish border. His parents were Spaniards who emigrated from Bocairent in Valencia. In 1955, he was named a lecturer of Spanish by the Superior University of Saint-Cloud. He completed his doctoral thesis in 1970. His thesis studied the Revolt of the Comuneros, and remains one of the leading scholarly books on the topics.

Pérez became a professor of Spanish and Hispanic American civilization at the University of Bordeaux 3. Pérez also served as a member of the Directorio del Centre National de la Recherche Scientifique (CNRS).

Pérez has worked to spread French and Spanish culture in both directions. He founded the La Maison des Pays Iberiques, a center for Spanish culture in France, and between 1989 and 1996 Pérez directed the Casa de Velázquez in Madrid, a French cultural institution funded by the French government dedicated to supporting interplay between France and Hispanic cultures.

Pérez died on 8 October 2020 in Bordeaux, aged 89.

== Ideas ==
Joseph Pérez challenges the notion of decadence that is associated with Spain in the 17th and 18th centuries. For him, this Black Legend is a distorted image due to the views held by the Protestant countries of northern Europe.

== Awards and honors ==
Pérez's doctoral thesis won the Saintour prize that year. He has served as honorary president of the University of Bordeaux 3.

Pérez was a corresponding member of the Real Academia de la Historia. He was awarded an honorary doctorate by the University of Valladolid. Other honors include being Order of Alfonso X the Wise, a Commander of the Order of Isabella the Catholic, and a member of the French Legion of Honor.

On 25 January 2007 the board of the Municipality of Bocairent voted unanimously to grant Pérez the title of "Adopted son of Bocairent." Bocairent was the birthplace of his parents and his three brothers. The ceremony celebrating the event was held on March 30, 2007 at the town hall.

In 2014, Pérez won the Princess of Asturias Awards in Social Sciences.

== Works ==
Aside from books, Pérez wrote numerous articles, especially in Bulletin Hispanique, such as his well-received notes and introduction to El caballero de Olmedo by Lope de Vega.

- La révolution des "Comunidades" de Castille (1520-1521) Bordeaux: Institut d'Etudes Ibériques et Ibero-Américaines de l'Université, 1970, translated as La revolución de las comunidades de Castilla (1520-1521), Madrid: Siglo XXI de España, 1978 (The revolution of the Comunidades of Castile (1520-1521))
- Los movimientos precursores de la emancipación en Hispanoamérica, Madrid: Alhambra, Madrid: Alhambra, 1977. (Precursor movements to the emancipation of Latin America)
- Histoire de l'Espagne, Paris: Fayard, 1997, translated as Historia de España, Barcelona: Crítica, 1999. (History of Spain)
- Isabel y Fernando, los Reyes Católicos, Fuenterrabía: Nerea, 2001 (Isabella and Ferdinand, the Catholic Monarchs)
- Historia de una tragedia: la expulsión de los judíos de España, Barcelona: Crítica, 1993 (History of a tragedy: The Expulsion of the Jews of Spain)
- El humanismo de Fray Luis de León, Madrid: Consejo Superior de Investigaciones Científicas, 1994. (The humanism of Luis de León)
- Lope de Vega, El caballero de Olmedo; edición, introducción y notas de Joseph Pérez. Madrid: Castalia, 1970 (The gentleman of Olmedo)
- Charles Quint: empereur des deux mondes, coll. "Découvertes Gallimard" (nº 197), París: Gallimard, 1994, translated to Spanish as Carlos V, Madrid: Temas de Hoy, 1999. (Charles V: Emperor of Two Worlds / Charles V)
- L'Espagne de Philippe II Paris: Le grand livre du mois, 1999; translated to Spanish as La España de Felipe II, Barcelona: Crítica, 2000. (The Spain of Philip II)
- L'Espagne des Rois Catholiques Paris: Bordas, 1971 (The Spain of the Catholic Monarchs)
- L'Espagne du XVIe siècle Paris: Armand Colin, 1973, later updated as La España del siglo XVI, Madrid: Anaya, 1998 (The Spain of the 16th century)
- Isabelle et Ferdinand, Rois Catholiques d'Espagne Paris: Fayard, 1988, translated to Spanish as Isabel y Fernando, los Reyes Católicos (Madrid: Nerea, 1997. ISBN 84-89569-12-6) (Isabella and Ferdinand, the Catholic Monarchs)
- Crónica de la Inquisición en España, Barcelona: Martínez Roca, 2002 (Chronicle of the Inquisition in Spain)
- Isabelle la Catholique: un modèle de chrétienté? Paris: Payot & Rivages, 2004 (Isabel la Católica : ¿un modelo de cristiandad? ALMED 2007 ISBN 978-84-935857-0-9) (Isabella the Catholic: A model of Christianity?)
- Los judíos en España, Madrid: Marcial Pons, 2005 ISBN 84-96467-03-1 (The Jews of Spain)
- La Inquisición española: crónica negra del Santo Oficio, Madrid: Martínez Roca, 2005 ISBN 84-270-3174-2 (The Spanish Inquisition: The black history of the Holy Office)
- De l'humanisme aux Lumières: études sur l'Espagne et l'Amérique, Madrid: Casa de Velázquez, 2000. (Of the Humanism of the Enlightenment: Studies of Spain and America)
