= Claude Silve =

French writer

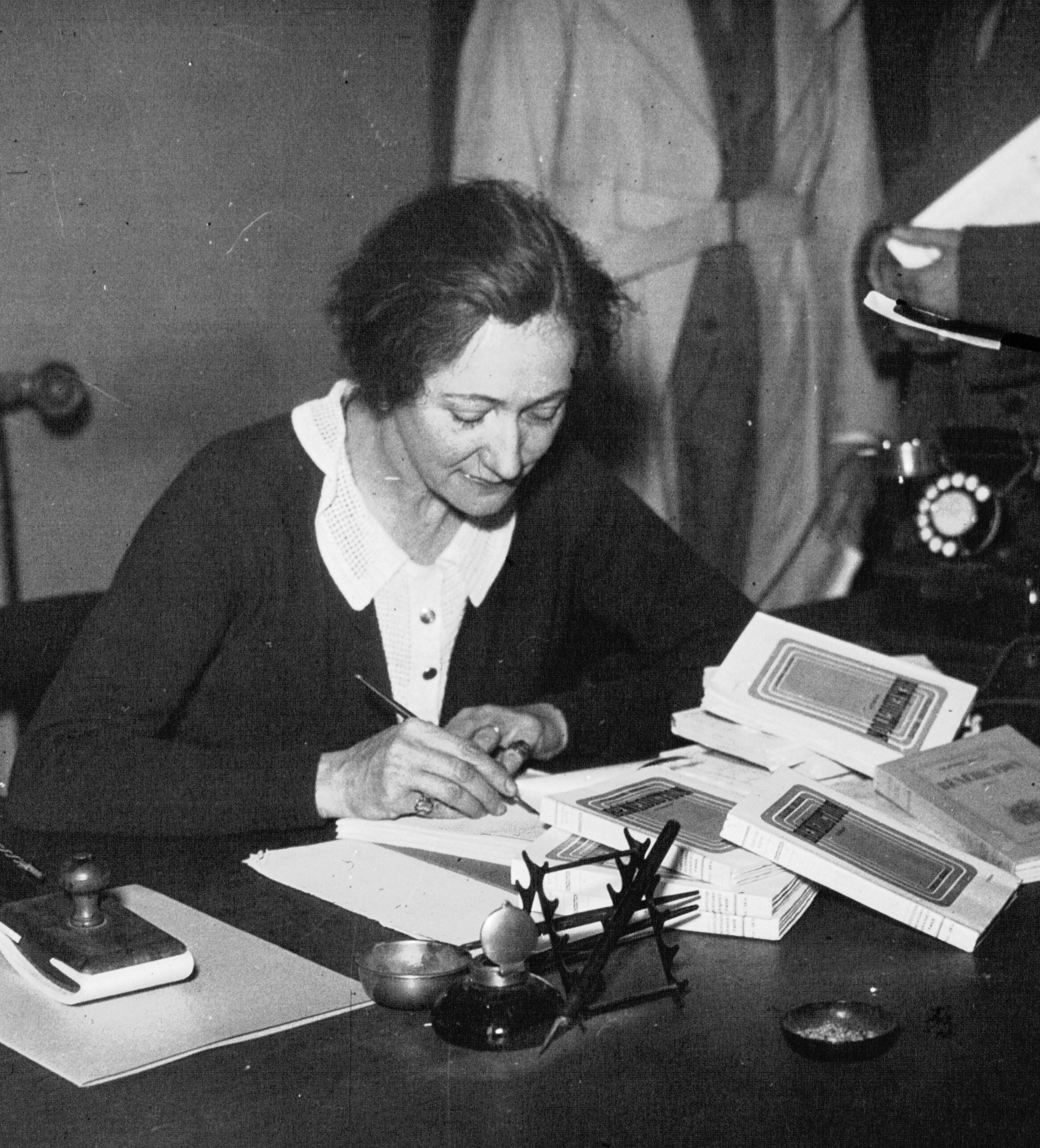
- Claude Silve in 1935 signing her novel Bénédiction.
- Born: Philomène de Lévis-Mirepoix; 11 August 1887; Léran, Ariège (department)
- Died: 27 June 1978 (aged 90); Neuilly-sur-Seine
- Occupation: Writer

Philomène Marie Charlotte Gaudérique Félicité Ghislaine de Lévis-Mirepoix, Countess Jules de La Forest Divonne (11 August 1887 – 27 July 1978), better known by her pen name Claude Silve (French pronunciation: [klod silv]), was a French writer. She was a recipient of the Prix Femina, a French literary prize, in 1935 for her novel Bénédiction.

She also received the Prix Maillé-Latour-Landry of the Académie Française in 1912 for her first book, La Cité des lampes.

Silve was born into a noble family, the House of Lévis (better known as the Lévis-Mirepoix), and was the sister of writer and historian Antoine de Lévis-Mirepoix.

On 29 May 1927 she married Count Joseph François Marie Jules de la Forest Divonne, thus becoming Countess Jules de La Forest Divonne, though she is most commonly remembered by her pen name.

== Works ==
- 1912: La Cité des lampes
- 1929: La Fièvre bleue
- 1935: Bénédiction, Prix Femina
- 1936: Le Palertin
- 1937: Arpèges
- 1938: Un jardin vers l'Est
- 1941: Lumière cendrée
