= Prades, Ariège =

Commune in Occitanie, France

Prades
- Commune
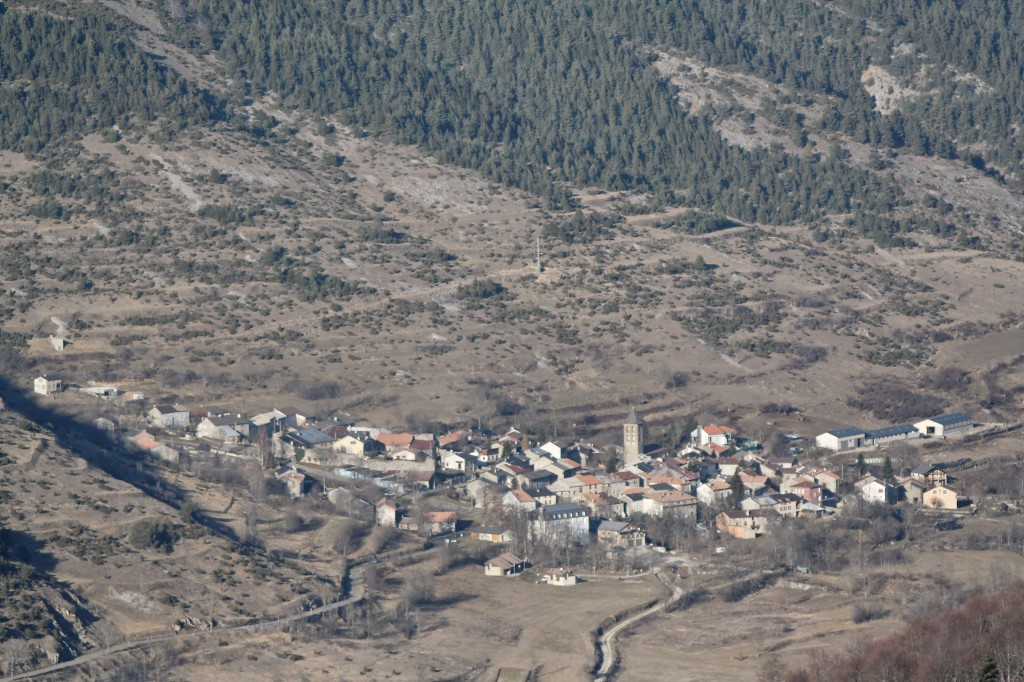
- Prades seen from above

- Coat of arms
- Location of Prades
- Location within France Location within Occitanie
- Coordinates: 42°47′16″N 1°52′45″E
- Country: France
- Region: Occitania
- Department: Ariège
- Arrondissement: Foix
- Canton: Haute-Ariège

Government
  - Mayor (2020–2026): Hervé Peloffi
- Area^{1}: 28.97 km^{2} (11.19 sq mi)
- Elevation: 1,250 m (4,100 ft)
- Highest elevation: 1,921 m (6,302 ft)
- Lowest elevation: 1,078 m (3,537 ft)
- Population (2023): 54
  - Density: 1.9/km^{2} (4.8/sq mi)
- Time zone: UTC+01:00 (CET)
  - Summer (DST): UTC+02:00 (CEST)
- INSEE/Postal code: 09232 /09110
- Website: prades-ariege.fr
- ^{1} French Land Register data, which excludes lakes, ponds, glaciers > 1 km^{2} (0.386 sq mi or 247 acres) and river estuaries.

Prades (French pronunciation: [pʁad]; Occitan: Pradas) is a commune in the Ariège department in southwestern France.

== Population ==
Inhabitants are called Pradéens in French.

Historical population
Year	Pop.	±% p.a.
1968	97	—
1975	73	−3.98%
1982	67	−1.22%
1990	53	−2.89%
1999	47	−1.33%
2007	50	+0.78%
2012	43	−2.97%
2017	33	−5.16%
2023	54	+8.55%
Source: INSEE

== Geography ==
The village is located in the Pyrenees on the river Hers-Vif.

== See also ==
- Communes of the Ariège department
