= Antoine de Lévis-Mirepoix =

French historian, novelist and essayist

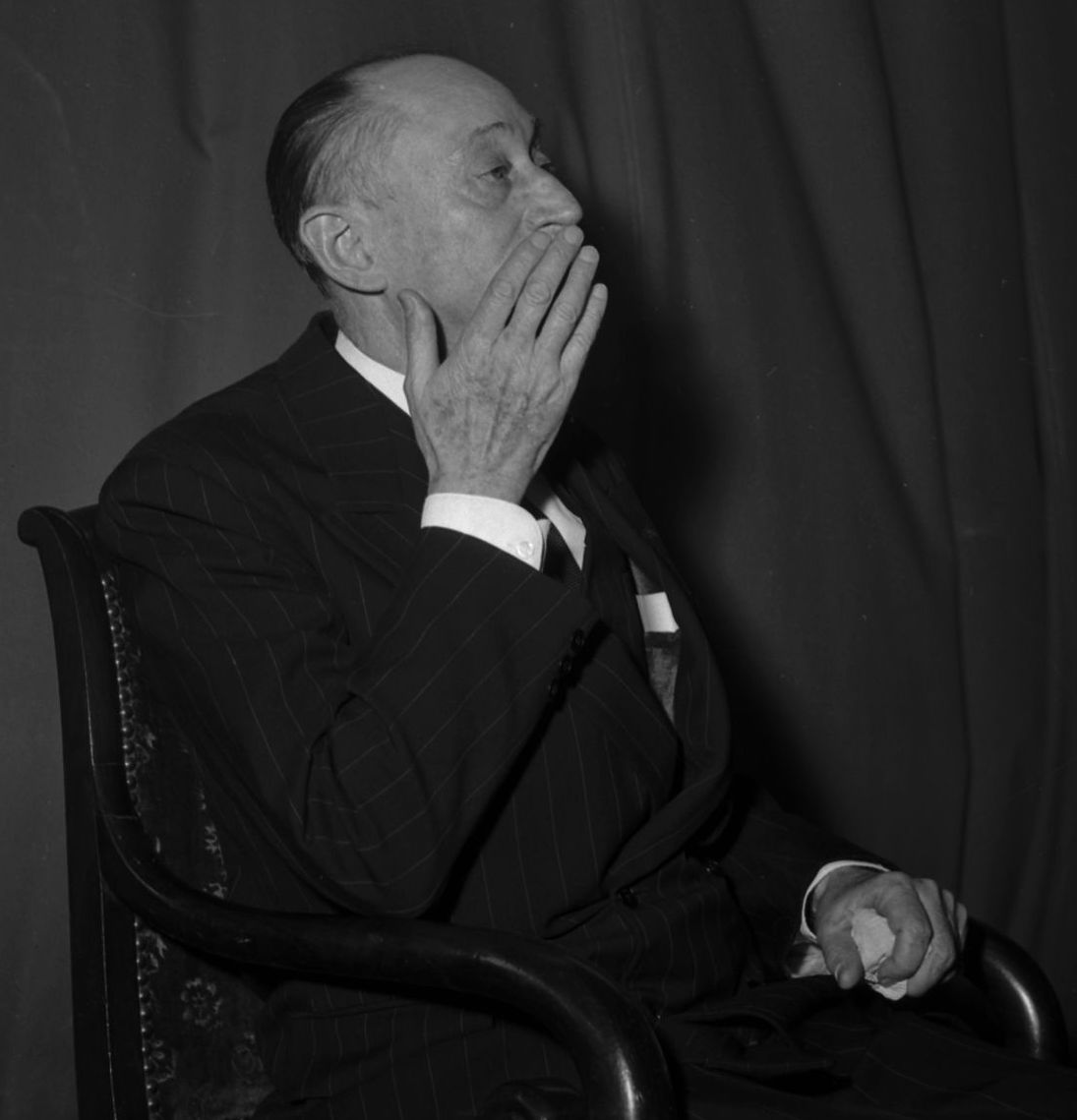
Antoine de Lévis-Mirepoix in 1953.

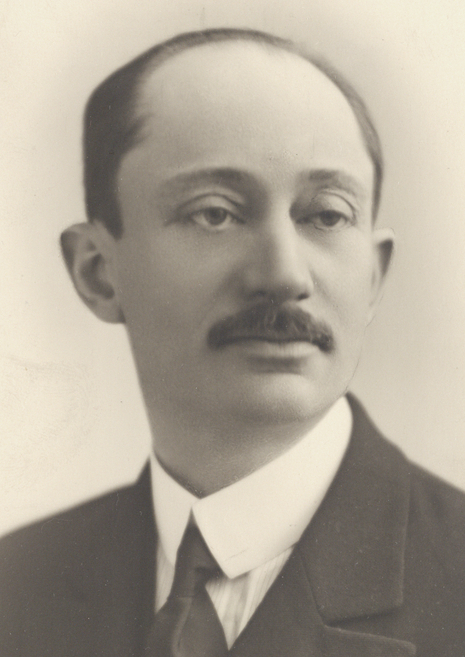

Antoine Pierre Marie François Joseph de Lévis-Mirepoix, 5th Duke of San Fernando Luis, GE (1 August 1884 in Léran, Ariège – 16 July 1981, in Lavelanet) was a French historian, novelist and essayist. He was known as duke of Lévis-Mirepoix (having inherited the dukedom on his father's death on 10 May 1915), also having the titles of fifth Duke of San Fernando Luis, grandee of Spain and 4th baron of de Lévis-Mirepoix. The writer Claude Silve, winner of the Prix Femina in 1935 for her novel Bénédiction was his sister.

== Publications ==
- Philippe Auguste et ses trois femmes, Coll. Histoire, XXXIII, Club des Libraires de France, Paris, 1962, 328 pages
