= Bélesta, Ariège =

Commune in Occitanie, France

Bélesta
- Commune
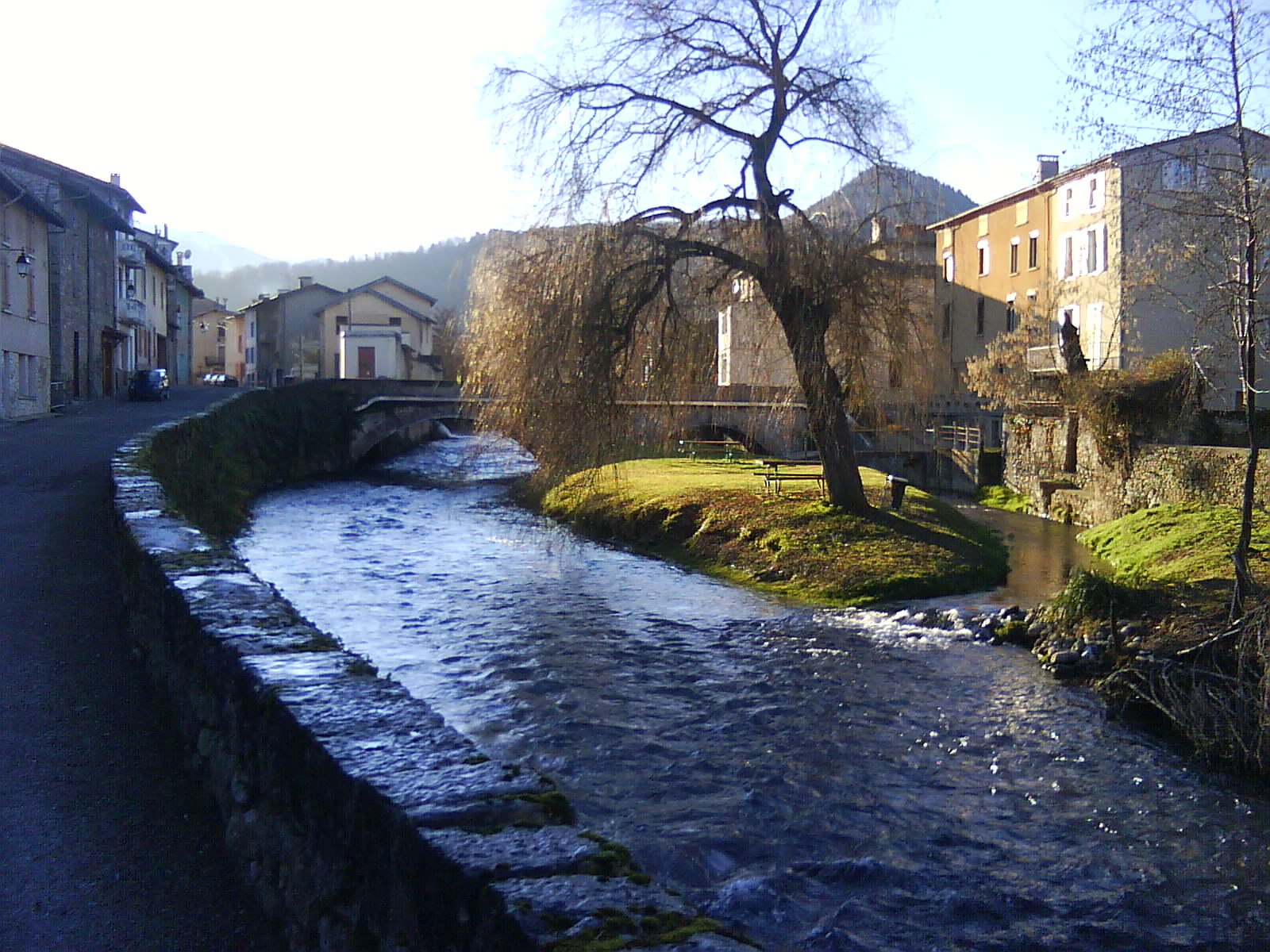
- The bridge over the Hers-Vif

- Coat of arms
- Location of Bélesta
- Location within France Location within Occitanie
- Coordinates: 42°54′16″N 1°56′06″E
- Country: France
- Region: Occitania
- Department: Ariège
- Arrondissement: Pamiers
- Canton: Pays d'Olmes
- Intercommunality: Pays d'Olmes

Government
  - Mayor (2020–2026): Marcel Girma
- Area^{1}: 26.94 km^{2} (10.40 sq mi)
- Elevation: 494 m (1,621 ft)
- Highest elevation: 1,082 m (3,550 ft)
- Lowest elevation: 475 m (1,558 ft)
- Population (2023): 1,091
  - Density: 40.50/km^{2} (104.9/sq mi)
- Time zone: UTC+01:00 (CET)
  - Summer (DST): UTC+02:00 (CEST)
- INSEE/Postal code: 09047 /09300
- ^{1} French Land Register data, which excludes lakes, ponds, glaciers > 1 km^{2} (0.386 sq mi or 247 acres) and river estuaries.

Bélesta (French pronunciation: [belɛsta]; Occitan: Belestar) is a commune, situated on the Hers-Vif river in the Ariège department of southwestern France.

== History ==
Situated in the valley of the Hers-Vif, Bélesta is known for its fir tree forest, which was a former royal forest whose wood was used to construct the mast of ships. 1 km upstream from the village is a spring, created by a significant surge of water from the Karst Plateau de Sault.

== Population ==
Historical population
Year	Pop.	±% p.a.
1968	1,330	—
1975	1,441	+1.15%
1982	1,386	−0.55%
1990	1,337	−0.45%
1999	1,179	−1.39%
2007	1,105	−0.81%
2012	1,065	−0.73%
2017	1,064	−0.02%
2023	1,091	+0.42%
Source: INSEE

== See also ==
- Communes of the Ariège department
