= Lac de Montbel =

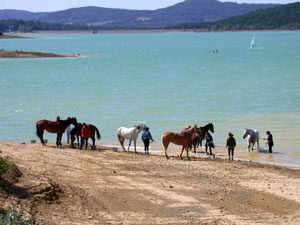
- Lac de Montbel

- Location within France
- Coordinates: 42°58′33″N 1°57′31″E
- Type: Reservoir
- Built: 1982 to 1985
- Surface area: 550 hectares (1,400 acres)
- Max. depth: 42 m (138 ft)
- Water volume: 60 million cubic metres (49,000 acre⋅ft; 16×10^{9} US gal)

The Lac de Montbel is a reservoir which is a popular location for fishing, watersports, and swimming. It is located 4km west of Chalabre, to the north of Sainte-Colombe-sur-l'Hers, on the border between the Ariège and Aude départements of southwestern France.

The flooded hillsides are still evident when the water level drops, revealing tree stumps and the thick sticky clay (marl) so typical of the Ariège. On quiet hot summer days the water takes on a beautiful turquoise colour which is very photogenic.

The area is relatively undeveloped, and quiet and privacy are a great attraction. From some of the lake, the mountains of the Pyrenees are visible in the background.

Other lakes for swimming near Montbel include Lac de la Cavayère and a smaller one at Pradelles-Cabardès.

The dam which created the reservoir was built between 1982 and 1985.
