= Hers-Vif =

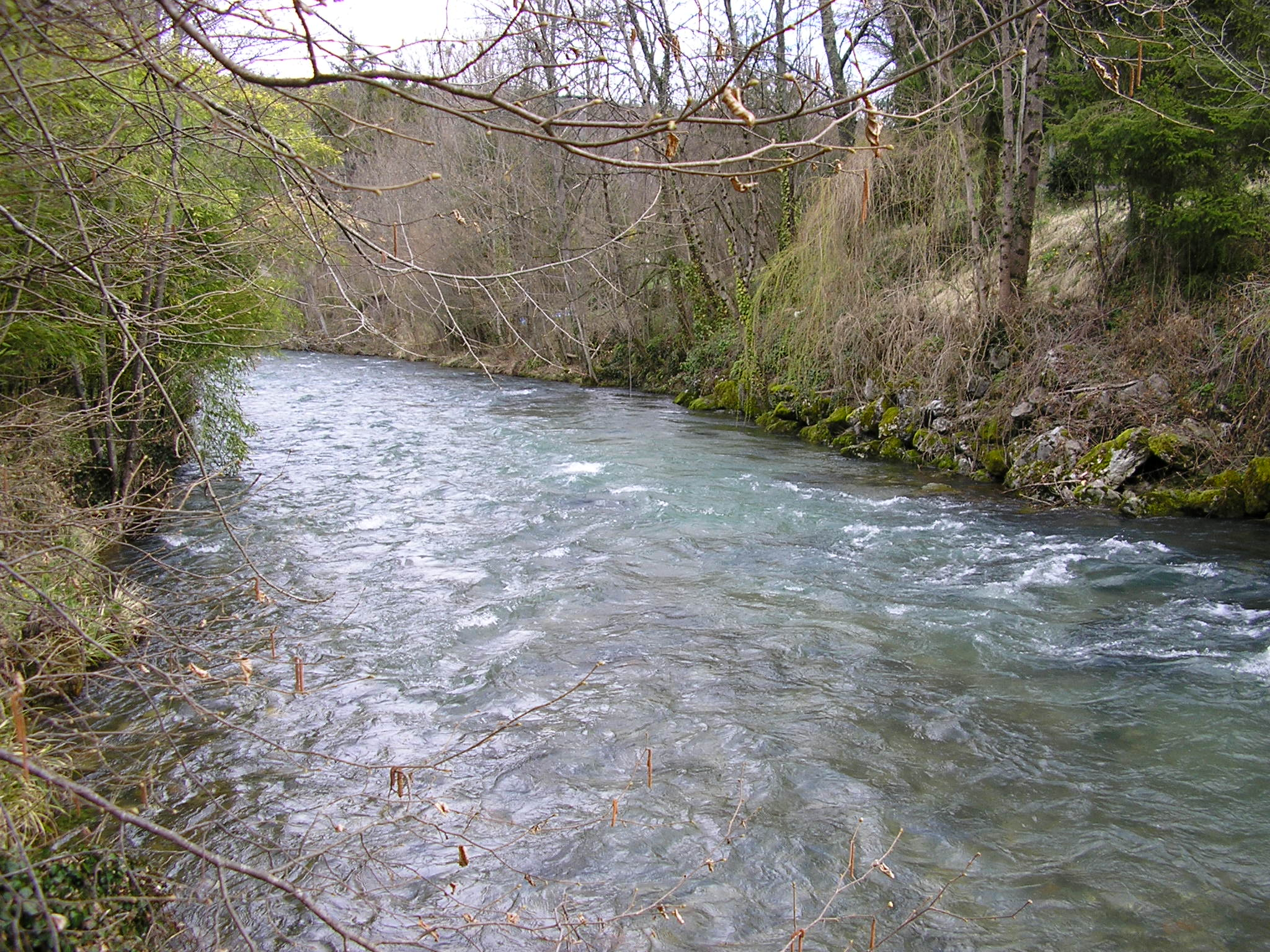

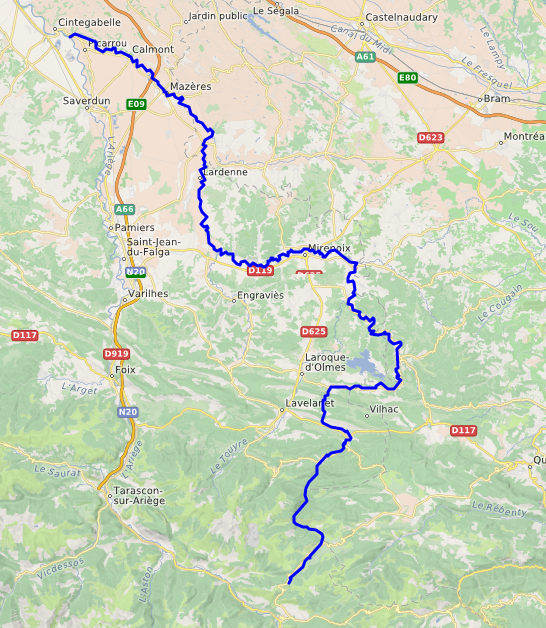

Location
- Country: France

Physical characteristics
- Source
  - location: Pyrenees
  - elevation: ±1,500 m (4,900 ft)
- Mouth
  - location: Ariège
  - coordinates: 43°18′21″N 1°33′9″E
- Length: 135 km (84 mi)
- Basin size: 1,350 km^{2} (520 mi^{2})
- Discharge
  - average: 15 m^{3}/s (530 cu ft/s)

Basin features
- Progression: Ariège→ Garonne→ Gironde estuary→ Atlantic Ocean

The Hers-Vif (French pronunciation: [ɛʁs vif], "Live Hers" (Occitan: Erç Viure), as opposed to the slower flowing Hers-Mort, "Dead Hers"), also named Grand Hers or simply Hers, is a 135-kilometre (84 mi) long river in southern France, right tributary of the Ariège.

The Hers-Vif rises at an elevation of about 1,500 metres (4,900 ft) near the Chioula Pass of the Pyrenees, approximately 6 kilometres (4 mi) north of Ax-les-Thermes. It is the major tributary of the Ariège into whose right bank it flows 2 kilometres (1.2 mi) upstream from Cintegabelle in the Haute-Garonne.

It flows some 30 kilometres (19 mi) through the Pyrenees, descending 1,100 metres (3,600 ft) to the village of Peyrat, where it reaches a piedmont plain. Its valley widens as it traverses the plain, reaching the medieval city of Mirepoix, which marks the start of its lower valley.

Several rivers flow into it:

- From the Pyrenees: the Lasset; the Fontaine de Fontestorbes; the Touyre
- From the piedmont plain and hills: the Blau and the Douctouyre;
- From the hills of Lauragais and Razès: the Ambronne and the Vixiège

Departments and towns along its course are:

- Ariège: Prades, Bélesta, La Bastide-sur-l'Hers, Mirepoix, Mazères
- Aude: Comus, Chalabre
- Haute-Garonne: Calmont

== Floods ==
The Hers is probably known as vif (intense or rapid in this context) because of its sometimes spectacular floods – that of 16 June 1289 having entirely destroyed Mirepoix. More recently, there have been:

- 23 June 1875: estimated flow rate of 1,500 cubic metres per second (53,000 cu ft/s) at Mazères;
- 6 February 1919: estimated flow rate of 600 to 800 cubic metres per second (21,000 to 28,000 cu ft/s) at Mazères;
- 19 May 1977: estimated flow rate of 1,070 cubic metres per second (38,000 cu ft/s) at Mazères;
- 16 January 1981: estimated flow rate of 1,100 cubic metres per second (39,000 cu ft/s) at Mazères;
- 11 June 2000: estimated flow rate of 500 cubic metres per second (18,000 cu ft/s) at Mazères;
- 24 January 2004: estimated flow rate of 500 cubic metres per second (18,000 cu ft/s) at Mazères.
