= Léran =

Commune in Occitanie, France

- Commune
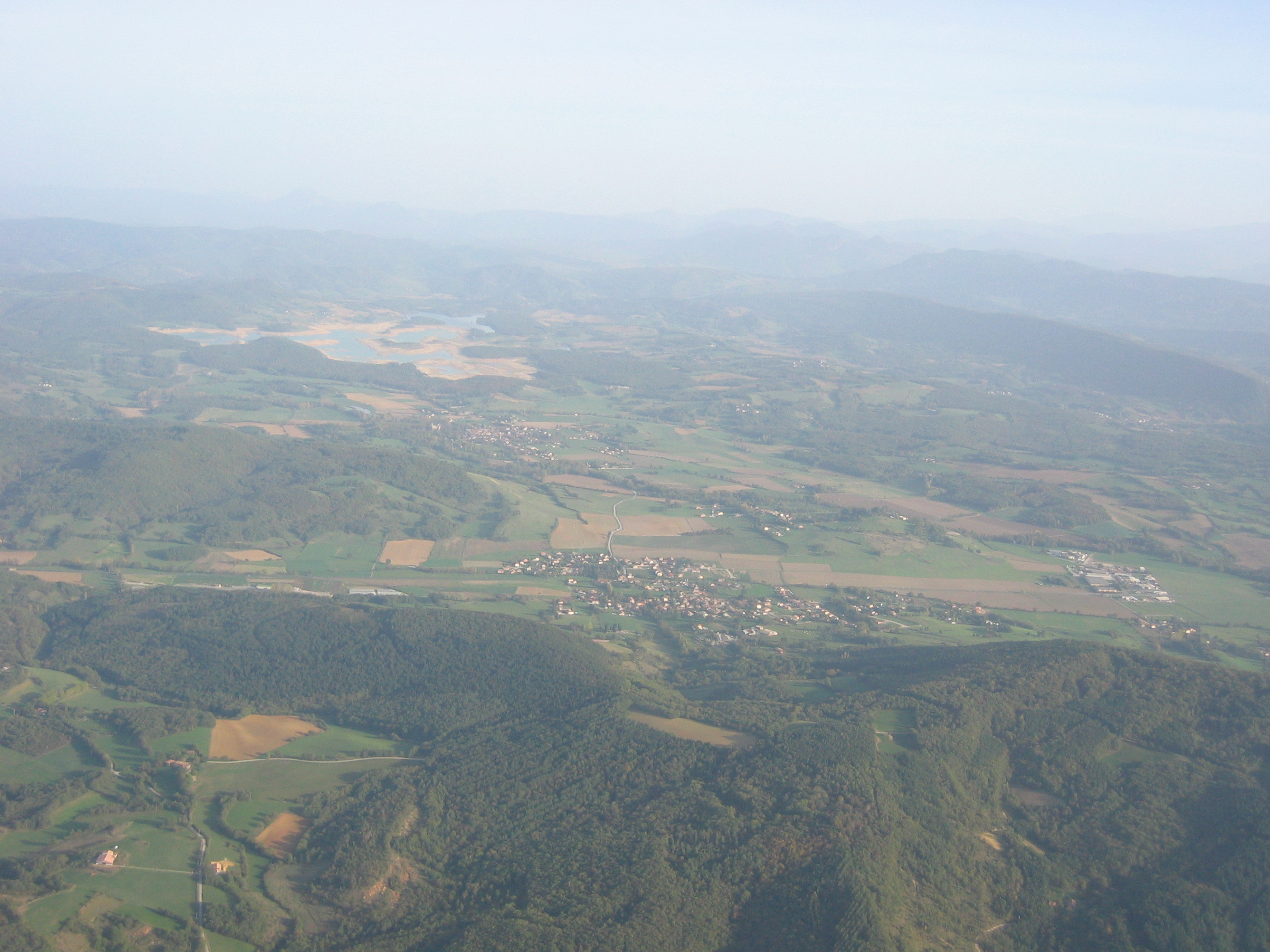
- View of Aigues-Vives, Léran and the Lac de Montbel

- Coat of arms
- Location of Léran
- Location within France Location within Occitanie
- Coordinates: 42°59′22″N 1°54′39″E
- Country: France
- Region: Occitania
- Department: Ariège
- Arrondissement: Pamiers
- Canton: Mirepoix
- Intercommunality: Pays de Mirepoix

Government
  - Mayor (2020–2026): Sébastien Bertrand
- Area^{1}: 11.92 km^{2} (4.60 sq mi)
- Elevation: 396 m (1,299 ft)
- Highest elevation: 545 m (1,788 ft)
- Lowest elevation: 375 m (1,230 ft)
- Population (2023): 615
  - Density: 51.6/km^{2} (134/sq mi)
- Time zone: UTC+01:00 (CET)
  - Summer (DST): UTC+02:00 (CEST)
- INSEE/Postal code: 09161 /09600
- ^{1} French Land Register data, which excludes lakes, ponds, glaciers > 1 km^{2} (0.386 sq mi or 247 acres) and river estuaries.

Léran (French pronunciation: [leʁɑ̃]; Occitan: Leran) is a commune in the Ariège department in southwestern France.

== Geography ==
The city is situated on the coast of Lac de Montbel, an artificial reservoir.

== Population ==
Its citizens are called Léranais in French.

Historical population
Year	Pop.	±% p.a.
1968	599	—
1975	592	−0.17%
1982	548	−1.10%
1990	595	+1.03%
1999	539	−1.09%
2007	520	−0.45%
2012	640	+4.24%
2017	591	−1.58%
2023	615	+0.67%
Source: INSEE

== Administration ==
The current mayor, elected in 2020, is Sébastien Bertrand. He succeeded Henri Barrou, school principal, who was in office since 2001.

== Sights ==
- The Chateau de Léran can be seen in the commune, which dates to 1163.

== Personalities ==
- Claude Silve (1887–1978), a writer, was born in Léran.

== See also ==
- Communes of the Ariège department
