= Laroque-d'Olmes =

Commune in Occitanie, France

- Commune
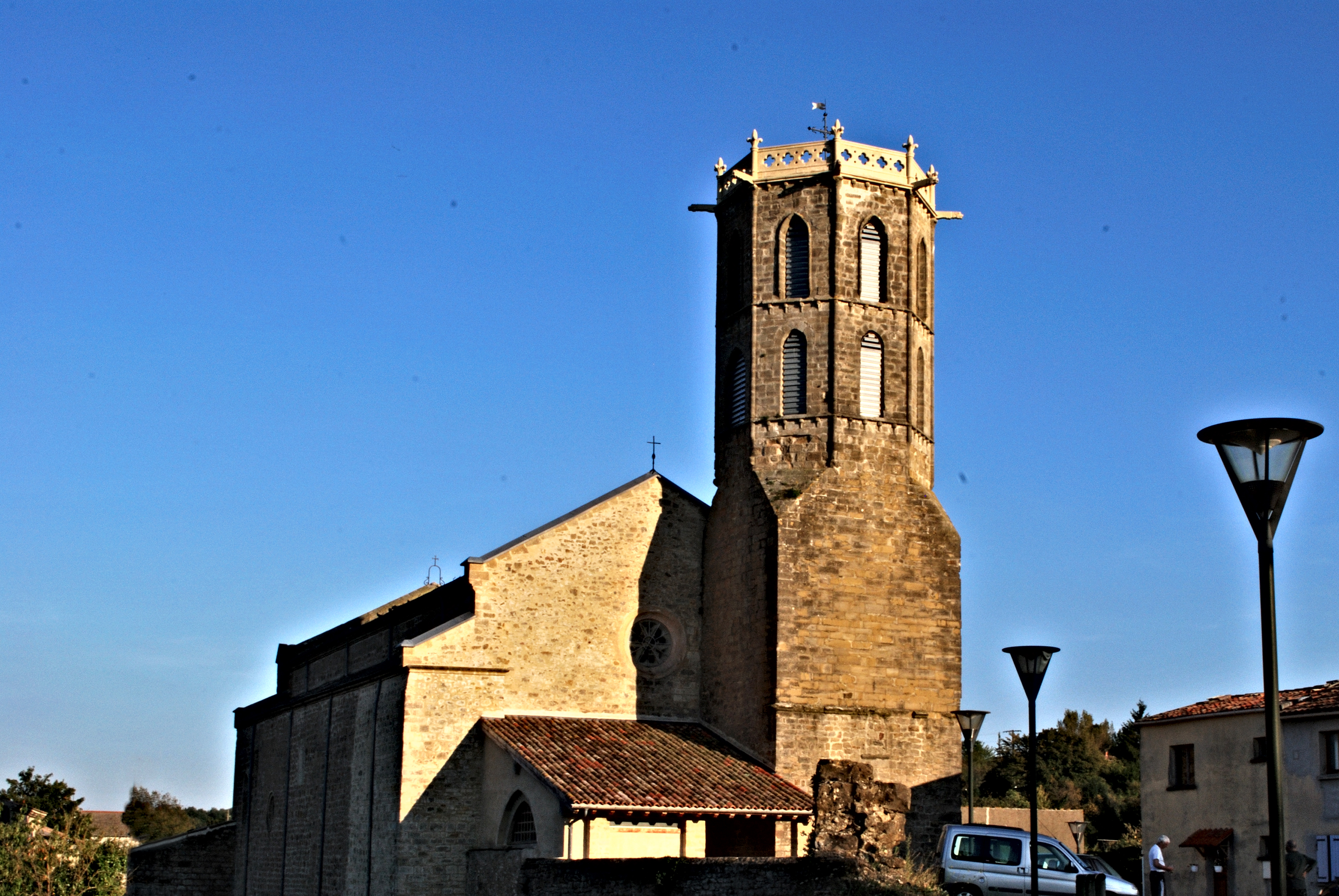
- The church in Laroque-d'Olmes

- Coat of arms
- Location of Laroque-d'Olmes
- Location within France Location within Occitanie
- Coordinates: 42°58′16″N 1°52′22″E
- Country: France
- Region: Occitania
- Department: Ariège
- Arrondissement: Pamiers
- Canton: Mirepoix
- Intercommunality: Pays d'Olmes

Government
  - Mayor (2020–2026): Patrick Laffont
- Area^{1}: 14.36 km^{2} (5.54 sq mi)
- Elevation: 465 m (1,526 ft)
- Highest elevation: 735 m (2,411 ft)
- Lowest elevation: 408 m (1,339 ft)
- Population (2023): 2,454
  - Density: 170.9/km^{2} (442.6/sq mi)
- Time zone: UTC+01:00 (CET)
  - Summer (DST): UTC+02:00 (CEST)
- INSEE/Postal code: 09157 /09600
- Website: https://www.facebook.com/randoxygene09
- ^{1} French Land Register data, which excludes lakes, ponds, glaciers > 1 km^{2} (0.386 sq mi or 247 acres) and river estuaries.

Laroque-d'Olmes (French pronunciation: [laʁɔk dɔlm]; Occitan: La Ròca d'Òlmes) is a commune in the Ariège department in southwestern France.

== Population ==
Historical population
Year	Pop.	±% p.a.
1901	1,178	—
1962	2,640	+1.33%
1968	2,894	+1.54%
1975	3,114	+1.05%
1982	3,124	+0.05%
1990	3,106	−0.07%
1999	2,657	−1.72%
2007	2,705	+0.22%
2012	2,589	−0.87%
2017	2,433	−1.24%
2023	2,454	+0.14%
Source: EHESS and INSEE (1968-2023)

== See also ==
- Communes of the Ariège department
